= B62 Studios =

Indian film production company

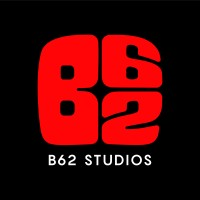
- Type: Private
- Industry: Entertainment
- Founded: December 6, 2020; 5 years ago
- Founder: Aditya Dhar; Lokesh Dhar
- Headquarters: Mumbai, Maharashtra, India
- Key people: Aditya Dhar; Lokesh Dhar
- Products: Film production

B62 Studios is an Indian film production company founded in 2021 by filmmaker Aditya Dhar and his brother Lokesh Dhar. Based in Mumbai, the company primarily produces Hindi-language films in association with Jio Studios. It has produced Article 370 (2024), Dhoom Dhaam, Baramulla, Dhurandhar (three films in 2025) and its sequel Dhurandhar: The Revenge (2026); the Dhurandhar duology emerged the highest-grossing Indian film franchise of all time.

== Filmography ==
Key
†	Denotes films that have not yet been released

Year	Title	Cast	Notes	Ref.
2024	Article 370	Yami Gautam, Priyamani	Co-produced with Jio Studios	
2025	Dhoom Dhaam (Note: Released on Netflix.)	Yami Gautam, Pratik Gandhi	Co-produced with Jio Studios	
2025	Baramulla	Manav Kaul, Bhasha Sumbli	Co-produced with Jio Studios	
2025	Dhurandhar	Ranveer Singh, Akshaye Khanna, Sanjay Dutt, Arjun Rampal, R. Madhavan	Co-produced with Jio Studios	
2026	Dhurandhar: The Revenge	Ranveer Singh, Arjun Rampal, Sanjay Dutt, R. Madhavan	Co-produced with Jio Studios	

== Accolades ==
Year	Award	Category	Nominee/Work	Result	Ref.
2025	25th IIFA Awards	Best Film	Article 370	Nominated	
2025	25th IIFA Awards	Best Director	Aditya Suhas Jambhale	Nominated	
2025	25th IIFA Awards	Best Actress	Yami Gautam	Nominated	
2025	25th IIFA Awards	Best Supporting Actress	Priyamani	Nominated	
2025	25th IIFA Awards	Best Male Playback Singer	Jubin Nautiyal for "Dua"	Won	
2025	25th IIFA Awards	Best Dialogue	Arjun Dhawan, Aditya Dhar, Aditya Suhas Jambhale, Monal Thaakar	Won	
2025	70th Filmfare Awards	Best Film	Article 370	Nominated	
2025	70th Filmfare Awards	Best Director	Aditya Suhas Jambhale	Nominated	
2025	70th Filmfare Awards	Best Debut Director	Aditya Suhas Jambhale	Nominated	
2025	70th Filmfare Awards	Best Actress	Yami Gautam	Nominated	
2025	70th Filmfare Awards	Best Supporting Actress	Priyamani	Nominated	
2025	70th Filmfare Awards	Best Story	Aditya Dhar and Monal Thaakar	Won	
2025	70th Filmfare Awards	Best Screenplay	Aditya Dhar, Aditya Suhas Jambhale, Arjun Dhawan, Monal Thaakar	Nominated	
2025	70th Filmfare Awards	Best Costume Design	Veera Kapoor EE	Nominated	
2025	Filmfare OTT Awards	Best Actress	Yami Gautam	Nominated	
2025	Filmfare OTT Awards	Best Dialoge	Aditya Dhar	Nominated	
2025	Filmfare OTT Awards	Best Background Music	Clinton Cerejo & Bianca Gomes	Nominated	
2026	Bollywood Hungama OTT India Fest	Best Feature Film	Baramulla	Nominated	
