= List of Netflix India original films =

Netflix India is the Indian subsidiary of the American streaming service Netflix. Since its launch in January 2016, it has distributed a number of Indian "originals"—primarily feature films, along with some short films.

Netflix's first original titles for India were the film Love per Square Foot and the series Sacred Games, both released in 2018.

This article lists the Indian original films produced or distributed by Netflix.

== List ==
=== Feature films ===
Title	Genre	Premiere	Runtime	Language(s)
Love per Square Foot	Romantic comedy	14 February 2018	2 hours, 13 min	Hindi
Sometimes	Psychological drama	1 May 2018	1 hour, 41 min	Tamil
Lust Stories	Anthology	15 June 2018	2 hours	Hindi
Brij Mohan Amar Rahe	Action comedy	3 August 2018	1 hour, 45 min	Hindi
Rajma Chawal	Comedy drama	30 November 2018	1 hour, 57 min	Hindi
Soni	Crime drama	18 January 2019	1 hour, 37 min	Hindi
Music Teacher	Drama	19 April 2019	1 hour, 41 min	Hindi
Chopsticks	Comedy drama	31 May 2019	1 hour, 40 min	English/Hindi
Jaoon Kahan Bata Ae Dil	Romantic drama	9 August 2019	1 hour, 46 min	Hindi
Upstarts	Comedy drama	18 October 2019	1 hour, 52 min	Hindi
Drive	Heist film	1 November 2019	1 hour, 59 min	Hindi
House Arrest	Comedy	15 November 2019	1 hour, 44 min	Hindi
Ghost Stories	Horror anthology	1 January 2020	2 hours, 24 min	Hindi
Yeh Ballet	Biographical film	21 February 2020	1 hour, 57 min	Hindi
Guilty	Romantic thriller	6 March 2020	1 hour, 59 min	Hindi/English
Maska	Romantic dramedy	27 March 2020	1 hour, 52 min	Hindi/English
Mrs. Serial Killer	Crime thriller	1 May 2020	1 hour, 46 min	Hindi
Choked: Paisa Bolta Hai	Drama	5 June 2020	1 hour, 54 min	Hindi
Bulbbul	Period supernatural thriller	24 June 2020	1 hour, 34 min	Hindi
Raat Akeli Hai	Police procedural	31 July 2020	2 hours, 29 min	Hindi
Gunjan Saxena: The Kargil Girl	Biographical film	12 August 2020	1 hour, 52 min	Hindi
Class of '83	Police procedural	21 August 2020	1 hour, 38 min	Hindi
Dolly Kitty Aur Woh Chamakte Sitare	Drama	18 September 2020	2 hours, 6 min	Hindi
Serious Men	Satire	2 October 2020	1 hour, 54 min	Hindi/English
Ginny Weds Sunny	Romantic comedy	9 October 2020	2 hours	Hindi
Kaali Khuhi	Mystery-horror	30 October 2020	1 hour, 30 min	Hindi
Ludo	Black comedy/Anthology	12 November 2020	2 hours, 30 min	Hindi
AK vs AK	Dark comedy thriller	24 December 2020	1 hour, 48 min	Hindi
Tribhanga – Tedhi Medhi Crazy	Family drama	15 January 2021	1 hour, 35 min	Hindi/English/Marathi
The Girl on the Train	Mystery thriller	26 February 2021	1 hour, 52 min	Hindi
Pagglait	Family dramedy	26 March 2021	1 hour, 54 min	Hindi
Ajeeb Daastaans	Romantic drama/Anthology	16 April 2021	2-hour, 22 min	Hindi
The Disciple	Music drama	30 April 2021	2 hours, 7 min	Marathi
Milestone	Drama	7 May 2021	1 hour, 38 min	Hindi/Punjabi
Cinema Bandi (Note: Labeled as Netflix Film in selected regions)	Comedy	14 May 2021	1 hour, 38 min	Telugu
Sardar Ka Grandson	Family dramedy	18 May 2021	2 hours, 19 min	Hindi
Skater Girl	Coming-of-age sports drama	11 June 2021	1 hour, 49 min	Hindi/English
Jagame Thandhiram	Action thriller	18 June 2021	2 hours, 37 min	Tamil
Haseen Dillruba	Romantic mystery thriller	2 July 2021	2 hours, 15 min	Hindi
Ankahi Kahaniya	Anthology	17 September 2021	1 hour, 50 min	Hindi
Meenakshi Sundareshwar	Romantic dramedy	5 November 2021	2 hours, 12 min	Hindi
Dhamaka	Suspense thriller	19 November 2021	1 hour, 44 min	Hindi
Minnal Murali	Superhero	24 December 2021	2 hours, 39 min	Malayalam
Looop Lapeta	Comedy thriller	4 February 2022	2 hours, 11 min	Hindi
Cobalt Blue	Romantic drama	2 April 2022	1 hour, 52 min	Hindi/English
Thar	Western thriller	6 May 2022	1 hour, 48 min	Hindi
Jaadugar	Sports dramedy	15 July 2022	2 hours, 46 min	Hindi
Darlings	Romantic dark comedy	5 August 2022	2 hours, 13 min	Hindi
Jogi	Period drama	16 September 2022	1 hour, 56 min	Hindi
Plan A Plan B	Romantic comedy	30 September 2022	1 hour, 46 min	Hindi
Monica, O My Darling	Neo-noir comedy thriller	11 November 2022	2 hours, 10 min	Hindi
Qala	Musical/Psychological drama	1 December 2022	1 hour, 59 min	Hindi
Mission Majnu	Spy thriller	20 January 2023	2 hours, 9 min	Hindi
Chor Nikal Ke Bhaga	Heist thriller	24 March 2023	1 hour, 50 min	Hindi
Kathal – A Jackfruit Mystery	Satirical mystery comedy	19 May 2023	1 hour, 55 min	Hindi
Lust Stories 2	Romantic drama/Anthology	29 June 2023	2 hours, 12 min	Hindi
Friday Night Plan	Coming-of-age comedy drama	1 September 2023	1 hour, 48 min	Hindi/English
Jaane Jaan	Romantic mystery thriller	21 September 2023	2 hours, 19 min	Hindi
Khufiya	Spy thriller	5 October 2023	2 hours, 38 min	Hindi
The Archies	Musical	7 December 2023	2 hours, 24 min	Hindi/English
Kho Gaye Hum Kahan	Romantic comedy	26 December 2023	2 hours, 25 min	Hindi
Bhakshak	Crime thriller	9 February 2024	2 hours, 25 min	Hindi
Murder Mubarak	Mystery Crime thriller	15 March 2024	2 hours, 36 min	Hindi
Amar Singh Chamkila	Biographical drama	12 April 2024	2 hours, 43 minutes	Hindi
Maharaj	Historical drama	21 June 2024	2 hours, 11 minutes	Hindi
Wild Wild Punjab	Comedy	10 July 2024	1 hour, 51 minutes	Hindi
Phir Aayi Hasseen Dillruba	Romantic thriller	9 August 2024	2 hours, 13 minutes	Hindi
Sector 36	Crime drama	13 September 2024	2 hours, 4 minutes	Hindi
CTRL	Thriller	4 October 2024	1 hour, 39 minutes	Hindi
Do Patti	Mystery thriller	25 October 2024	2 hours, 7 minutes	Hindi
Vijay 69	Sports drama	8 November 2024	1 hour, 52 minutes	Hindi
Sikandar Ka Muqaddar	Thriller	29 November 2024	2 hours, 38 min	Hindi
Dhoom Dhaam	romantic action comedy	14 February 2025	1 hours, 48 min	Hindi
Nadaaniyan	romantic comedy	7 March 2025	1 hours, 59 min	Hindi
Jewel Thief	heist action thriller	25 April 2025	1 hours, 58 min	Hindi
Inspector Zende	comedy thriller	5 September 2025	1 hours, 52 min	Hindi
Greater Kalesh	Comedy drama	17 October 2025	52 min	Hindi
Baramulla	Horror	7 November 2025	112 min	Hindi
Raat Akeli Hai: The Bansal Murders	crime thriller	19 December 2025	136 min	Hindi
Accused	drama	27 February 2026	106 min	Hindi
Made in Korea	comedy drama	12 March 2026	113 min	Tamil
Toaster	Comedy drama	15 April 2026	126 min	Hindi
Kartavya	action thriller	15 May 2026	108 min	Hindi
Maa Behen	Black comedy	4 June 2026	127 min	Hindi
Ikka	Courtroom drama	10 July 2026	140 min	Hindi
Pyaar Prema Kalyanam	Romantic comedy	21 August 2026	125 min	Tamil
Gandhari	Action thriller	3 September 2026	115 min	Hindi
Lust Stories 3	Romantic drama/Anthology	18 September 2026	163 min	Hindi
Reporting Live	Investigative thriller	9 October 2026	116 min	Hindi
Gajab Raat	Crime thriller	23 October 2026	123 min	Hindi
Meethe Mein Kya Hai	Family drama	30 October 2026	119 min	Hindi
Dilwali Diwali	Family drama	5 November 2026	61 min	Hindi

=== Documentaries ===
Title	Premiere	Runtime	Language(s)
Ladies First	8 March 2018	40 min.	Hindi/English
Period. End of Sentence.	19 February 2019	25 min.	Hindi/English
Rooting for Roona	15 October 2020	41 min.	Bengali
Searching for Sheela	22 April 2021	58 min.	Hindi
The Elephant Whisperers	8 December 2022	41 min.	Tamil
Mumbai Mafia: Police vs Underworld	6 January 2023	87 min.	Hindi/English
Caught Out: Crime. Corruption. Cricket	17 March 2023	78 min.	Hindi/English
Curry & Cyanide – The Jolly Joseph Case	22 December 2023	95 min.	Malayalam/English
Modern Masters: S. S. Rajamouli	2 August 2024	114 min.	English
Nayanthara: Beyond the Fairytale	18 November 2024	82 min.	English

=== Interactive special ===
Title	Premiere	Runtime	Languages
Ranveer vs Wild with Bear Grylls	8 July 2022	70 min.	Hindi/English

Title	First screening	Genre	Runtime	Netflix exclusive region	Language
Krishna and His Leela	25 June 2020	Romantic comedy	2 hours, 5 min.	Selected territories	Telugu
Uma Maheswara Ugra Roopasya	30 July 2020	Comedy drama	1 hour, 45 min.	Selected territories	Telugu
Maniyarayile Ashokan	31 August 2020	Comedy drama	1 hour, 50 min.	Selected territories	Malayalam
Miss India	3 November 2020	Romantic drama	2 hours, 16 min.	Selected territories	Telugu
Andhaghaaram	23 November 2020	Supernatural horror thriller	2 hours, 51 min.	Selected territories	Tamil
Torbaaz	11 December 2020	Action thriller	2 hours, 13 min.	Selected territories	Hindi
Aelay	5 March 2021	Comedy drama	2 hours, 31 min.	Selected territories	Tamil
Irul	1 April 2021	Mystery thriller	1 hour, 30 min.	Selected territories	Malayalam
Mandela	5 April 2021	Political satire	2 hours, 20 min.	Selected territories	Tamil
Mimi	26 July 2021	Comedy drama	2 hours, 13 min.	Selected territories	Hindi
Boomika	23 August 2021	Action thriller	2 hours, 2 min.	Selected territories	Tamil
Tughlaq Durbar	11 September 2021	Political drama	2 hours, 25 min.	Selected territories	Tamil
Dasvi	7 April 2022	Social comedy	2 hours, 5 min.	Selected territories	Hindi
Toolsidas Junior	23 May 2022	Sport drama	2 hours, 10 min.	Selected territories	Hindi
