= IIFA Award for Best Film =

Annual film award in India

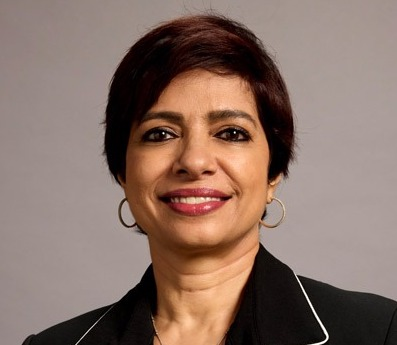
- 2026 Recipient: Jyoti Deshpande for Dhurandhar
- Awarded for: Best Film of the Year
- Country: India
- Presented by: International Indian Film Academy
- First award: 2000 (for films released in 1999)
- Currently held by: Dhurandhar (2026)
- Website: iifa.com

The IIFA Award for Best Film is chosen via a worldwide poll and the winner is announced at the ceremony. UTV Motion Pictures won 3 awards each, followed by Sanjay Leela Bhansali & Yash Chopra with 2 awards each.

== Winners and nominees ==
2000 (1st)
Film	Production company(s)	Producer(s)
Hum Dil De Chuke Sanam	SLB Films & Jhamu Sughand Productions	Sanjay Leela Bhansali, Jhamu Sughand
Biwi No.1	Puja Films	Vashu Bhagnani
Sarfarosh	Cinematt Pictures	John Matthew Matthan
Taal	Mukta Arts	Subhash Ghai
Vaastav: The Reality	Adishakti Films	Deepak Nikhalje

2001 (2nd)
Film	Production company(s)	Producer(s)
Kaho Naa... Pyaar Hai	Film Kraft	Rakesh Roshan

2002 (3rd)
Film	Production company(s)	Producer(s)
Lagaan	Aamir Khan Productions, Ashutosh Gowariker Productions, Jhamu Sughand Productions	Aamir Khan

2003 (4th)
Film	Production company(s)	Producer(s)
Devdas	Mega Bollywood	Satish Kaushik

2004 (5th)
Film	Production company(s)	Producer(s)
Kal Ho Naa Ho	Dharma Productions	Yash Johar

2005 (6th)
Film	Production company(s)	Producer(s)
Veer-Zaara	Yash Raj Films	Aditya Chopra, Yash Chopra
Dhoom	Yash Raj Films	Aditya Chopra
Hum Tum	Yash Raj Films	Yash Chopra
Main Hoon Na	Red Chillies Entertainment	Shahrukh Khan, Gauri Khan
Mujhse Shaadi Karogi	Nadiadwala Grandson Entertainment	Sajid Nadiadwala
Swades	Ashutosh Gowariker Productions	Ashutosh Gowariker, Ronnie Screwvala

2006 (7th)
Film	Production company(s)	Producer(s)
Black	Applause Entertainment	Sanjay Leela Bhansali, Anshuman Swami
Bunty Aur Babli	Yash Raj Films	Aditya Chopra, Yash Chopra
Iqbal	Mukta Searchlight Films	Subhash Ghai
No Entry	S K Films Enterprises, Sahara One	Boney Kapoor, Surinder Kapoor
Page 3	Light House Films Pvt. Ltd., Sahara One	Baldev Pushkarna, Bobby Pushkarna
Parineeta	Vinod Chopra Productions	Vidhu Vinod Chopra

2007 (8th)
Film	Production company(s)	Producer(s)
Rang De Basanti	UTV Motion Pictures	Rakeysh Omprakash Mehra, Ronnie Screwvala
Dhoom 2	Yash Raj Films, AMC Entertainment	Aditya Chopra, Aashish Singh
Kabhi Alvida Naa Kehna	Dharma Productions	Hiroo Johar
Krrish	Filmkraft Productions	Rakesh Roshan
Lage Raho Munna Bhai	Vinod Chopra Productions	Vidhu Vinod Chopra
Vivah	Rajshri Productions	Ajit Kumar Barjatya, Kamal Kumar Barjatya, Rajkumar Barjatya

2008 (9th)
Film	Production company(s)	Producer(s)
Chak De! India	Yash Raj Films	Aditya Chopra, Yash Chopra
Guru	Madras Talkies	Mani Ratnam, G. Srinivasan
Jab We Met	Shree Ashtavinayak Cine Vision Ltd	Dhillin Mehta
Life in a... Metro	UTV Motion Pictures	Ronnie Screwvala
Om Shanti Om	Red Chillies Entertainment	Gauri Khan

2009 (10th)
Film	Production company(s)	Producer(s)
Jodhaa Akbar	UTV Motion Pictures, Ashutosh Gowariker Productions	Ronnie Screwvala, Ashutosh Gowariker
A Wednesday!	UTV Motion Pictures, Anjum Rizvi Film Company, A Friday Filmworks	Ronnie Screwvala, Shital Bhatia, Anjum Rizvi
Dostana	Dharma Productions, Yash Raj Films	Yash Johar, Karan Johar
Ghajini	Geetha Arts, Reliance Entertainment	Tagore Madhu, Madhu Mantena
Race	Tips Music Films, UTV Motion Pictures	Ramesh Taurani, Kumar Taurani
Rock On!!	Excel Entertainment, Reliance Big Pictures	Farhan Akhtar, Ritesh Sidhwani

=== 2010's ===
2010 (11th)
Film	Production company(s)	Producer(s)
3 Idiots	Vinod Chopra Productions	Vidhu Vinod Chopra
Dev.D	UTV Spot Boy, Bindass	Ronnie Screwvala
Kaminey	UTV Motion Pictures	Ronnie Screwvala
Love Aaj Kal	Illuminati Films and Eros International	Saif Ali Khan, Dinesh Vijan
Paa	Reliance Big Pictures, MAD Entertainment Ltd., Amitabh Bachchan Corporation	Sunil Manchanda
Wanted	Sahara One Motion Pictures, S K Films Enterprises	Boney Kapoor

2011 (12th)
Film	Production company(s)	Producer(s)
Dabangg	Shree Ashtavinayak Cine Vision Ltd, Arbaaz Khan Productions	Arbaaz Khan, Malaika Arora Khan, Dhillin Mehta
Band Baaja Baaraat	Yash Raj Films	Aditya Chopra
My Name Is Khan	Dharma Productions, Fox Star Studios, Red Chillies Entertainment	Hiroo Johar, Gauri Khan
Once Upon a Time in Mumbaai	Balaji Motion Pictures	Ekta Kapoor, Shobha Kapoor
Raajneeti	Prakash Jha Productions, Walkwater Media, UTV Motion Pictures	Prakash Jha

2012 (13th)
Film	Production company(s)	Producer(s)
Zindagi Na Milegi Dobara	Eros International, Excel Entertainment, UTV Motion Pictures	Farhan Akhtar, Ritesh Sidhwani
Bodyguard	Funky Buddha Productions, Reel Life Productions, Reliance Entertainment	Atul Agnihotri
No One Killed Jessica	UTV Spotboy	Ronnie Screwvala
Rockstar	Shree Ashtavinayak Cine Vision Ltd, Eros International	Sunil Lulla, Dhilin Mehta
The Dirty Picture	ALT Entertainment, Balaji Motion Pictures	Ekta Kapoor, Shobha Kapoor

2013 (14th)
Film	Production company(s)	Producer(s)
Barfi!	UTV Motion Pictures	Ronnie Screwvala, Siddharth Roy Kapur
English Vinglish	Eros International, Hope Productions	Sunil Lulla, R. Balki, Rakesh Jhunjhunwala, R. K. Damani
Gangs of Wasseypur	Viacom 18 Motion Pictures	Atul Shukla, Anurag Kashyap, Sunil Bohra
Kahaani	Viacom 18 Motion Pictures, Pen India Pvt.Ltd, Boundscript Motion Pictures	Sujoy Ghosh, Kushal Kantilal Gada
Paan Singh Tomar	UTV Motion Pictures	Ronnie Screwvala
Talaash: The Answer Lies Within	Excel Entertainment, Aamir Khan Productions, Reliance Entertainment	Ritesh Sidhwani, Aamir Khan, Farhan Akhtar
Vicky Donor	John Abraham Entertainment, Eros International	John Abraham

2014 (15th)
Film	Production company(s)	Producer(s)
Bhaag Milkha Bhaag	Reliance Entertainment	Viacom 18, Rakeysh Omprakash Mehra
Dhoom 3	Yash Raj Films	Aditya Chopra
Yeh Jawaani Hai Deewani	UTV Motion Pictures, Dharma Productions	Karan Johar
Goliyon Ki Raasleela Ram-Leela	Eros International	Sanjay Leela Bhansali, Chetan Deolekar, Kishore Lulla, Sandeep Singh
Krrish 3	Filmkraft Productions Pvt. Ltd	Rakesh Roshan
Kai Po Che!	UTV Motion Pictures	Ronnie Screwvala, Siddharth Roy Kapur
Chennai Express	UTV Motion Pictures	Gauri Khan, Ronnie Screwvala, Siddharth Roy Kapur

2015 (16th)
Film	Production company(s)	Producer(s)
Queen	Phantom Films	Anurag Kashyap, Vikramaditya Motwane
2 States	UTV Motion Pictures	Karan Johar and Sajid Nadiadwala
Haider	UTV Motion Pictures	Vishal Bhardwaj and Siddharth Roy Kapur
Highway	UTV Motion Pictures	Sajid Nadiadwala, Imtiaz Ali
PK	UTV Motion Pictures	Vidhu Vinod Chopra, Rajkumar Hirani
Mary Kom	Viacom18	Sanjay Leela Bhansali

2016 (17th)
Film	Production company(s)	Producer(s)
Bajrangi Bhaijaan	Salman Khan Films, Kabir Khan Films	Salman Khan, Rockline Venkatesh
Bajirao Mastani	Bhansali Productions	Sanjay Leela Bhansali, Kishore Lulla
Piku	MSM Motion Pictures, Saraswati Entertainment	N.P. Singh, Ronnie Lahiri, Sneha Rajani
Talvar	VB Pictures	Vineet Jain, Vishal Bhardwaj
Tanu Weds Manu Returns	Colour Yellow	Krishika Lulla, Sunil Lulla

2017 (18th)
Film	Production company(s)	Producer(s)
Neerja	Fox Star Studios	Atul Kasbekar, Shanti Sivaram Maini
Ae Dil Hai Mushkil	Dharma Productions	Karan Johar, Hiroo Yash Chopra, Apoorva Mehta
M.S. Dhoni: The Untold Story	Fox Star Studios, Friday FilmWorks, Inspired Entertainment	Arun Pandey
Pink	Rashmi Sharma Telefilms Limited	Ronnie Lahiri, Sheel Kuma
Sultan	Yash Raj Films	Aditya Chopra
Udta Punjab	Balaji Motion Pictures, Phantom Films	Shobha Kapoor, Ekta Kapoor, Anurag Kashyap, Vikramaditya Motwane, Aman Gill, Vikas Bahl, Sameer Nair, Madhu Mantena

2018 (19th)

Film	Production company(s)	Producer(s)
Tumhari Sulu	T-Series, Ellipsis Entertainment	Bhushan Kumar, Tanuj Garg, Atul Kasbekar, Shanti Sivaram Maini
Bareilly Ki Barfi	Junglee Pictures, BR Studios	Vineet Jain, Renu Ravi
Hindi Medium	T-Series, Maddock Films	Dinesh Vijan, Bhushan Kumar, Krishan Kumar
Newton	Drishyam Films	Manish Mundra
Toilet: Ek Prem Katha	Viacom 18 Motion Pictures, KriArj Entertainment, Friday Filmworks, Plan C Studios, Cape of Good Films LLP	Aruna Bhatia, Shital Bhatia, Prernaa Arora, Arjun N. Kapoor, Hitesh Thakkar

2019 (20th)

Film	Production company(s)	Producer(s)
Raazi	Dharma Productions, Junglee Pictures	Vineet Jain, Karan Johar
Andhadhun	Viacom 18 Motion Pictures, Matchbox Pictures	Sudhanshu Vats, Ajit Andhare, Gaurav Nanda, Ashok Vasodia, Kewal Garg, Sanjay Routray
Badhaai Ho	Junglee Pictures, Chrome Pictures	Vineet Jain, Hemant Bhandari, Aleya Sen, Amit Ravindernath Sharma, Sushil Choudhary
Padmaavat	Bhansali Productions, Viacom18 Motion Pictures	Sanjay Leela Bhansali, Sudhanshu Vats, Ajit Andhare
Sanju	Rajkumar Hirani Films, Vinod Chopra Films	Rajkumar Hirani. Vidhu Vinod Chopra

=== 2020's ===
2020 (21st)

Film	Production company(s)	Producer(s)
Kabir Singh	T-Series Films	Bhushan Kumar, Krishan Kumar, Murad Khetani, Ashwin Varde
Article 15	Benaras Media Works, Zee Studios	Anubhav Sinha
Gully Boy	Excel Entertainment, Tiger Baby Films	Farhan Akhtar, Zoya Akhtar, Ritesh Sidhwani
Kesari	Dharma Productions, Zee Studios, Cape of Good Films, Azure Entertainment	Aruna Bhatia, Karan Johar, Hiroo Yash Johar, Apoorva Mehta, Sunir Khetarpal
Uri: The Surgical Strike	RSVP Movies	Ronnie Screwvala

2022 (22nd)

Film	Production company(s)	Producer(s)
Shershaah	Dharma Productions, Kaash Entertainment	Hiroo Yash Johar, Karan Johar, Apoorva Mehta, Shabbir Boxwala, Ajay Shah, Himanshu Gandhi
83	Reliance Entertainment, Phantom Films, Vibri Media, KA Productions, Nadiadwala Grandson Entertainment	Kabir Khan Films, Vishnu Vardhan Induri, Sajid Nadiadwala, Reliance Entertainment, Deepika Padukone
Sardar Udham	Rising Sun Films, Kino Works	Ronnie Lahiri, Sheel Kumar
Tanhaji: The Unsung Warrior	T-Series Films, Ajay Devgn FFilms	Ajay Devgn, Bhushan Kumar, Krishan Kumar
Thappad	Benaras Media Works, T-Series Films	Bhushan Kumar, Krishan Kumar, Anubhav Sinha

2023 (23rd)

Film	Production company(s)	Producer(s)
Drishyam 2	Panorama Studios, Viacom18 Studios, T-Series Films	Bhushan Kumar, Krishan Kumar, Kumar Mangat Pathak, Abhishek Pathak
Bhool Bhulaiyaa 2	T-Series Films, Cine1 Studios	Bhushan Kumar, Murad Khetani, Krishan Kumar, Anjum Khetani
Darlings	Red Chillies Entertainment, Eternal Sunshine Productions	Gauri Khan, Alia Bhatt, Gaurav Verma
Gangubai Kathiawadi	Bhansali Productions, Pen India Limited	Jayantilal Gada, Sanjay Leela Bhansali
Vikram Vedha	YNOT Studios	Bhansali Productions, Pen India Limited

2024 (24th)

Film	Production company(s)	Producer(s)
Animal	T-Series Films, Bhadrakali Pictures, Cine1 Studios	Bhushan Kumar, Krishan Kumar, Murad Khetani, Pranay Reddy Vanga
12th Fail	Vinod Chopra Films	Vidhu Vinod Chopra, Yogesh Ishwar
Jawan	Red Chillies Entertainment	Gauri Khan, Gaurav Verma
Rocky Aur Rani Kii Prem Kahaani	Dharma Productions, Viacom18 Studios	Hiroo Yash Johar, Karan Johar, Apoorva Mehta
Sam Bahadur	RSVP Movies	Ronnie Screwvala
Satyaprem Ki Katha	Nadiadwala Grandson Entertainment, Namah Pictures	Sajid Nadiadwala, Shareen Mantri Kedia, Kishor Arora

2025 (25th)

Film	Production company(s)	Producer(s)
Laapataa Ladies	Jio Studios, Aamir Khan Productions, Kindling Pictures	Aamir Khan, Kiran Rao, Jyoti Deshpande
Article 370	B62 Studios, Jio Studios	Jyoti Deshpande, Aditya Dhar, Lokesh Dhar
Bhool Bhulaiyaa 3	T-Series Films, Cine1 Studios	Bhushan Kumar, Krishan Kumar, Murad Khetani
Kill	Dharma Productions, Sikhya Entertainment	Hiroo Yash Johar, Karan Johar, Apoorva Mehta, Guneet Monga Kapoor, Achin Jain
Shaitaan	Jio Studios, Devgn Films, Panorama Studios	Ajay Devgn, Jyoti Deshpande, Abhishek Pathak, Kumar Mangat Pathak
Stree 2: Sarkate Ka Aatank	Maddock Films, Jio Studios	Dinesh Vijan, Jyoti Deshpande
