= Baramulla (film) =

2025 Indian film by Aditya Suhas Jambhale

- Official release poster
- Directed by: Aditya Suhas Jambhale
- Written by: Aditya Dhar; Aditya Suhas Jambhale; Monal Thaakar
- Produced by: Aditya Dhar; Lokesh Dhar; Jyoti Deshpande
- Starring: Manav Kaul; Bhasha Sumbli
- Cinematography: Arnold Fernandes
- Edited by: Shivkumar V. Panicker
- Music by: Shor Police; Clinton Cerejo
- Production companies: Jio Studios; B62 Studios
- Distributed by: Netflix
- Release date: 7 November 2025
- Running time: 112 minutes
- Country: India
- Language: Hindi

Baramulla is a 2025 Indian Hindi-language supernatural horror thriller film directed by Aditya Suhas Jambhale and produced under Jio Studios and B62 Studios. It stars Manav Kaul and Bhasha Sumbli in the lead roles. The film was released on 7 November 2025 on Netflix. It received mixed-to-positive reviews from critics with praise for the performances and cinematography.

== Plot ==
In Baramulla, Jammu and Kashmir, a young boy, Shoaib, mysteriously disappears during a magician's performance. The newly transferred DSP from Reasi, Ridwaan Sayyed, is put in charge of the investigation. He arrives with his wife, Gulnaar, and their children, Ayaan and Noorie, and the family moves into an old villa cared for by a mute attendant, Iqbal.

A year earlier in Reasi, Noorie and some of her schoolmates were taken hostage by terrorists at her school. During the rescue, Ridwaan accidentally shot one of Noorie's classmates while firing at a terrorist, leaving her deeply traumatised and estranged from him.

As Ridwaan investigates Shoaib's disappearance, he becomes convinced that the magician is innocent. Meanwhile, the Sayyed family is unsettled by strange occurrences in the villa. Ayaan finds a box of seashells and encounters a childlike apparition. Noorie, despite her severe allergy to dogs, senses one in the house and sees Iqbal taking food to the attic. Gulnaar also notices unexplained disturbances. The family is further shaken when locals mark the villa with the word 'kafir', and hostility from the town grows. Another local boy, Faisal, soon disappears in similar circumstances. Ridwaan questions Shoaib's school principal, Zainab, while Noorie struggles to settle in and befriends a local boy, Khalid. After more unsettling incidents, Noorie herself vanishes.

Ridwaan traces Khalid and discovers that he has been preaching religious extremism to local children and has persuaded Noorie to join the militants before her disappearance. Khalid is arrested, and Ridwaan learns of an underground network funded by the ISI that recruits and brainwashes children for militant training in Pakistan. Its unseen leader, “Bhaijaan”, and area commander, Juneid, oversee the operation. Khalid also reveals that the children were abducted by unknown forces before they could be transported, although the militants blamed the police.

At the villa, Gulnaar discovers that it once belonged to a Kashmiri Pandit family. Guided by a female apparition, she finds a hidden room filled with Kashmiri Shaivite symbols and enters a spectral realm where the missing children are being protected “from the poison filled in their brain and heart”. She tells Ridwaan, but he remains sceptical until she warns him that the apparitions will next abduct Yassir, Juneid's nephew.

Ridwaan rushes to stop Yassir from being trafficked to Pakistan, but the apparitions take him away in front of Ridwaan, finally convincing him that the supernatural is real. That night, Ridwaan returns to the villa for the ritual offering of food with Gulnaar and Iqbal in the attic. Through Ayaan, who is briefly possessed by a girl named Eela Sapru, the family learns that the villa's former occupants, the Saprus, were massacred by militants decades earlier after being betrayed. The spirits of the murdered family, including their dog, now protect children from radicalisation. Zainab also arrives at the villa with police officers after receiving a death threat.

Juneid and his militants then attack the villa. In the ensuing confrontation, Ridwaan and Gulnaar witness the Sapru family's final moments. Dr. Kamlanand Sapru, his wife Mansi, their daughter Eela, and their caretaker Iqbal were preparing to flee, but waited for their elder son, Sharad. Iqbal tried to persuade them to leave, but the militants arrived, cut out his tongue for helping the 'kafirs', killed Dr. Kamlanand and the family's pet dog, and hunted the others through the house. Eela's Muslim friend betrayed Mansi and Eela by revealing their hiding place, leading to their deaths.

In the present, Iqbal is killed in the fight, Gulnaar becomes possessed by Mansi Sapru, and the vengeful spirits help drive off the militants. Juneid tries to escape with Zainab as a hostage, but a possessed Gulnaar shoots Zainab, and Ridwaan kills Juneid. The family then discovers that “Bhaijaan” was actually Zainab, who had also betrayed the Sapru family in the past. The missing children, including Noorie, are returned, and the Sayyeds reconcile. A final dedication honours the Kashmiri Pandit community. Six months later, the Sayyeds visit Dr. Sharad Sapru, the Sapru family's sole surviving heir, and Ayaan returns Eela's seashell box to him.

== Cast ==
- Manav Kaul as DSP Ridwaan Shafi Sayyed
- Bhasha Sumbli as Gulnar Sayyed
- Arista Mehta as Noorie Sayyed
- Rohaan Singh as Ayaan
- Neelofar Hamid as Zainab, the Principal of the Local Public School
- Masoom Mumtaz Khan as Reporter Abbas Tilgami
- Ashwini Koul as Khalid, a pro-militancy agent
- Vikas Shukla as Shaukat
- Mir Sarwar as Ansari
- Priyank Tatariya as Dr. Kamlanand Sapru
- Nazneen Madan as Mansi Sapru
- Kiara Khanna as Eela Sapru
- Shahid Latief as Juneid Malik
- Sanjay Suri as Sharad Sapru, Kamlanad Sapru's son (cameo appearance)

== Release ==
The official trailer was unveiled on 30 October 2025. Baramulla was released on Netflix on 7 November 2025.

== Reception ==
On the review aggregator website Rotten Tomatoes, 54% of 13 critics' reviews are positive, with an average rating of 5/10. Radhika Sharma of NDTV gave it 2.5 stars out of 5 and said "Sad, cold and haunted. One sees Kashmir in a very different light in Baramulla." Mayur Sanap of Rediff.com awarded 3 stars out of 5 and said "The supernatural-mystery stuff is well balanced with Baramulla's more grounded, socially realistic elements, making it one of the most unique and creatively well-realized Hindi films." Rahul Desai of The Hollywood Reporter India writes in his review that "Aditya Suhas Jambhale’s film infuses partisan politics with supernatural horror — and the result is complicated." Johnny Loftus of Decider rated the movie worth a watch and said "The soundtrack amplifies each side of this film, its reaches for the supernaturally strange and the fraught local history that informs Ridwaan’s work to solve the kidnappings."

Anuj Kumar of The Hindu observed "Director Aditya Suhas Jambhale gets the mood, the atmospherics, and the suspense right, but when the fog subsides, the bombast of the ‘us vs them’ narrative becomes discernible." Vineeta Kumar of India Today rated it 3.5/5 stars and said "Manav Kaul delivers one of his most haunting performances yet in 'Baramulla', a Netflix film that finds horror not in ghosts but in grief, memory, and the pain of exile. A chilling reflection on loss and belonging in the Kashmir Valley." Lachmi Deb Roy of Firstpost rated it 2/5 stars and said "Netflix’s ‘Baramulla’ is a brilliant topic that should have been told in a better and convincing way."

Shubhra Gupta of The Indian Express also gave it 2 stars out of 5 and said "The film unravels in the way it tries to mix its allegorical elements with inconsistent plot-points which include terrorists-from-sarhad-paar involved with ‘farming’ innocents: too much obviousness takes away from the delicacy of the rest of it." Nandini Ramnath of Scroll.in observed "The good-looking movie extracts as much eeriness as possible from the snow-covered landscape and traditional wooden houses. After dithering about for far too long, Baramulla finally snaps into shape in the extended climax, pulling off the mask of horror to reveal … bared teeth." Bollywood Hungama gave it 3.5 stars out of 5 and said "On the whole, 'Baramulla' is a rare, one-of-its-kind film that fuses supernatural elements with the socio-political reality of Kashmir in a deeply impactful way."

Abhishek Srivastava of The Times of India rated the film 3.5 out of 5 stars and opined "The film succeeds in mood and atmosphere, delivering a world that feels both real and unsettling. Yet, it falls short of the emotional and narrative depth it aspires to." Rishabh Suri of Hindustan Times rated the film 3 out of 5 and remarked "It’s not without its imperfections, but it’s atmospheric cinema done with intent." Ajaz Rashid of Kashmir Times said "This film is remembrance, clothed in cinema. If Doctor Zhivago spoke for exiles, Baramulla is the voice of those who never had a choice." Jose Solis of Common Sense Media rated the film 2 out of 5 stars and stated "What begins as a stylish thriller turns into a tangled hybrid of social drama, crime story, and horror, until it collapses under the weight of its own ambitions."

== See also ==
- List of Netflix India original films
