= Jyoti Deshpande =

Indian businesswoman and film producer

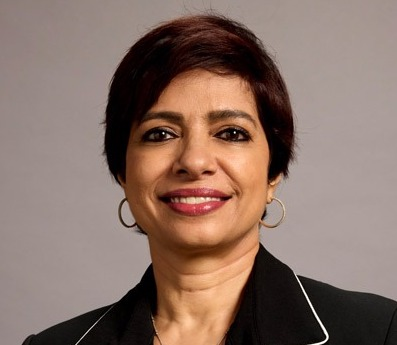
- Born: Mumbai, Maharashtra, India
- Occupations: Film producer; media executive
- Organizations: Jio Studios; Reliance Industries

Jyoti Deshpande is an Indian film producer and media executive. She is currently serving as the President of Media and Content Business at Reliance Industries and CEO of Jio Studios. She is the former CEO of Viacom 18 and managing director of Eros International. Jyoti is also the former co-chair of the Media & Entertainment Committee, FICCI. She has been featured in Fortune India as well as Business Today's 50 Most Powerful Women in Business.

== Early life and education ==
Born in Mumbai into a Marathi family, Deshpande earned a Bachelor of Commerce and Economics degree from Narsee Monjee College of Commerce and Economics. She provided tuition to students during college to finance her education and went on to do an MBA in 1993, from the S. P. Jain Institute of Management and Research in Mumbai.

== Career ==
After finishing her MBA, Deshpande acquired a position with Mindshare Media, a UK-based firm. She was a senior consultant at that time. She then was the Sales & Marketing Head for the Zee Network. She went to work for James Walter Thompson, an advertising firm, after working for Zee. She was a senior management team member that formed the B4U Television Network between 1999 and 2001. In 2018, she joined Reliance Industries as president of Media Platform & Content owned by Mukesh Ambani. She is the former CEO of Viacom 18 Media Pvt. Ltd and Group CEO and managing director of Eros International.

== Filmography ==
Key
| † | Denotes films that have not yet been released |

| Year | Film | Language | Notes |
|---|---|---|---|
| 2011 | Desi Boyz | Hindi | |
| 2016 | White | Malayalam | |
| 2017 | Sniff | Hindi | |
| 2020 | Angrezi Medium | Hindi | |
| 2022 | Vaahlam Jaao Ne | Gujarati | |
| 2022 | Laal Singh Chaddha | Hindi | |
| 2022 | Bhediya | Hindi | |
| 2023 | Boo | Tamil; Telugu | Bilingual film |
| 2023 | Kacchey Limbu | Hindi | |
| 2023 | Mumbaikar | Hindi | |
| 2023 | Zara Hatke Zara Bachke | Hindi | |
| 2023 | Bloody Daddy | Hindi | |
| 2023 | Gulaam Chor | Gujarati | |
| 2023 | Blind | Hindi | |
| 2023 | Sergeant | Hindi | |
| 2023 | Ishq-e-Nadaan | Hindi | |
| 2023 | Trial Period | Hindi | |
| 2023 | Appatha | Tamil | |
| 2023 | Bachubhai | Gujarati | |
| 2023 | Dawshom Awbotaar | Bengali | |
| 2023 | Dunki | Hindi | |
| 2023 | Jhimma 2 | Marathi | |
| 2024 | Teri Baaton Mein Aisa Uljha Jiya | Hindi | Co-produced with Dinesh Vijan and Laxman Utekar |
| 2024 | Article 370 | Hindi | Co-produced with Aditya Dhar and Lokesh Dhar |
| 2024 | Laapataa Ladies | Hindi | Co-produced with Aamir Khan and Kiran Rao |
| 2024 | Shaitaan | Hindi | |
| 2024 | Pon Ondru Kanden | Tamil | |
| 2024 | Ek Don Teen Chaar | Marathi | Co-produced with Ranjit Gugle, Keyur Godse, Nipun Dharmadhikari, Neeraj Biniwale |
| 2024 | Kotee | Kannada | |
| 2024 | Stree 2 | Hindi | |
| 2024 | Singham Again | Hindi | |
| 2024 | Baby John | Hindi | Co-produced with Murad Khetani, Atlee, Priya Atlee |
| 2025 | Sangeet Manapmaan | Marathi | Co-produced with Sunil Phadtare |
| 2025 | Sky Force | Hindi | Co-produced with Amar Kaushik, Bhaumik Gondaliya and Dinesh Vijan |
| 2025 | Dhoom Dhaam | Hindi | Co-produced with Aditya Dhar and Lokesh Dhar |
| 2025 | Maa | Hindi | Co-produced with Ajay Devgn and Kumar Mangat Pathak |
| 2025 | Son of Sardaar 2 | Hindi | Co-produced with Ajay Devgn, N. R. Pachisia, and Pravin Talreja |
| 2025 | Bhagwat: Chapter One – Raakshas | Hindi | Co-produced with Harman Baweja |
| 2025 | Baramulla | Hindi | Co-produced with Aditya Dhar and Lokesh Dhar |
| 2025 | Dhurandhar | Hindi | Co-produced with Aditya Dhar and Lokesh Dhar |
| 2026 | Dhurandhar: The Revenge | Hindi | Co-produced with Aditya Dhar and Lokesh Dhar |
| 2026 | Raja Shivaji | Marathi; Hindi | Co-produced with Genelia Deshmukh and Riteish Deshmukh |
| 2026 | Dorothy | Tamil | Co-produced with Guneet Monga Kapoor and Achin Jain |
| 2026 | Sumo Didi | Hindi | Co-produced with Akash Chawla, Arunava Sengupta, and Amit Chandraa |
| TBA | Khashaba † | Marathi | Co-produced with Gargee Kulkarni and Nagraj Manjule |
