= List of highest domestic net collection of Hindi films =

This is a ranking of highest domestic net collection of Hindi films, which includes films released in the Hindi language, based on the conservative global box office estimates as reported by industry sources. However, there is no official tracking of figures, and sources publishing data are frequently pressured to increase their estimates.

Indian films have been screened in markets around the world since the early 20th century. As of 2003, there are markets in over 90 countries where films from India are screened. During the first decade of the 21st century, there was a steady rise in the ticket price, a tripling in the number of theaters and an increase in the number of prints of a film being released, which led to a large increase in box office collections for major films. Ghajini (2008) was the first Indian film which earned over ₹100 crore net at the box office. While the dubbed Hindi version of Baahubali 2 (2017) was first to cross ₹500 crore; a 2026 blockbuster, Dhurandhar: The Revenge, became first Indian film to cross ₹1,000 crore net in Hindi language alone while netting over ₹1,100 crore in all languages.

The figures listed below are not adjusted for inflation.

== Original films ==
The following is a list of the top 50 films originally shot in Hindi language by domestic net collection:

*	Denotes films still running in theaters

Film	Release date	Studio(s)/Producers	Domestic net	Ref(s)
Dhurandhar: The Revenge	19 March 2026	Jio Studios; B62 Studios	₹1149.30 crore	
Ramayana: Part 1 *	5 November 2026	Prime Focus Studios; Monster Mind Creations; DNEG	₹889.99 crore	
Dhurandhar	5 December 2025	Jio Studios; B62 Studios	₹895.96 crore	
Jawan	7 September 2023	Red Chillies Entertainment	₹643.87 crore	
Stree 2	15 August 2024	Maddock Films	₹627.02 crore	
Chhaava	14 February 2025	Maddock Films	₹600.10 crore	
Animal	1 December 2023	T-Series Films; Bhadrakali Pictures; Cine1 Studios	₹556.36 crore	
Pathaan	25 January 2023	Yash Raj Films	₹543.05 crore	
Gadar 2	11 August 2023	Zee Studios; Anil Sharma Productions; MM Movies	₹525.45 crore	
Dangal	23 December 2016	Aamir Khan Productions Walt Disney Pictures India	₹387.38 crore	
Drishyam: The Conclusion *	2 October 2026	Panorama Studios; Star Studio18	₹372.48 crore	
Border 2	23 January 2026	T-Series Films; J. P. Films	₹356.20 crore	
Sanju	29 June 2018	Vinod Chopra Films; Rajkumar Hirani Films	₹342.53 crore	
PK	19 December 2014	Vinod Chopra Films; Rajkumar Hirani Films	₹340.80 crore	
Tiger Zinda Hai	22 December 2017	Yash Raj Films	₹339.16 crore	
Saiyaara	18 July 2025	Yash Raj Films	₹337.78 crore	
Hanuman Ansh *	7 August 2026	SWAMbhu Media Network; Holy Cow Home Productions	₹326.077 crore	
Bajrangi Bhaijaan	17 July 2015	Salman Khan Films; Kabir Khan Films	₹320.34 crore	
War	2 October 2019	Yash Raj Films	₹318.01 crore	
Padmaavat	25 January 2018	Viacom 18 Motion Pictures; Bhansali Productions	₹302.15 crore	
Sultan	6 July 2016	Yash Raj Films	₹300.45 crore	
Tiger 3	12 November 2023	Yash Raj Films	₹285.52 crore	
Dhoom 3	20 December 2013	Yash Raj Films	₹284.27 crore	
Bhool Bhulaiyaa 3	1 November 2024	T-Series Films; Cine1 Studios	₹283.80 crore	
Tanhaji	10 January 2020	T-Series; Ajay Devgn FFilms	₹279.55 crore	
Kabir Singh	21 June 2019	Cine1 Studios; T-Series	₹278.24 crore	
Singham Again	1 November 2024	Reliance Entertainment; Jio Studios; Rohit Shetty Picturez; Devgn Films; Cinergy	₹268.35 crore	
Brahmāstra: Part One – Shiva	9 September 2022	Dharma Productions; Star Studios	₹257.44 crore	
The Kashmir Files	11 March 2022	Zee Studios; Abhishek Agarwal Arts	₹252.90 crore	
Uri: The Surgical Strike	11 January 2019	Ronnie Screwvala	₹245.36 crore	
Krrish 3	1 November 2013	Filmkraft Productions Pvt. Ltd	₹244.92 crore	
The Kerala Story	5 May 2023	Sunshine Pictures	₹242.20 crore	
Drishyam 2	18 November 2022	Panorama Studios; Viacom18 Studios; T-Series Films	₹240.54 crore	
Simmba	28 December 2018	Reliance Entertainment; Rohit Shetty Picturez; Dharma Productions	₹240.31 crore	
Kick	25 July 2014	Nadiadwala Grandson Entertainment	₹231.85 crore	
Chennai Express	9 August 2013	Red Chillies Entertainment	₹227.13 crore	
Mirzapur	4 September 2026	Excel Entertainment; Amazon MGM Studios	₹218.16 crore	
Dunki	21 December 2023	Red Chillies Entertainment; Jio Studios; Rajkumar Hirani Films	₹212.42 crore	
Bharat	5 June 2019	Reel Life Productions; Salman Khan Films; T-Series	₹211.07 crore	
Prem Ratan Dhan Payo	12 November 2015	Rajshri Productions	₹210.16 crore	
Golmaal Again	20 October 2017	Reliance Entertainment	₹205.69 crore	
Good Newwz	27 December 2019	Zee Studios; Dharma Productions; Cape of Good Films	₹205.14 crore	
Happy New Year	24 October 2014	Red Chillies Entertainment	₹203 crore	
Mission Mangal	15 August 2019	Cape of Good Films; Hope Productions; Fox Star Studios	₹202.98 crore	
3 Idiots	25 December 2009	Vinod Chopra Films	₹202.95 crore	
Fighter	25 January 2024	Viacom18 Studios; Marflix Pictures	₹199.45 crore	
Ek Tha Tiger	15 August 2012	Yash Raj Films	₹198.78 crore	
Sooryavanshi	5 November 2021	Reliance Entertainment; Rohit Shetty Picturez; Dharma Productions; Cape of Good Films	₹196 crore	
Housefull 4	25 October 2019	Fox Star Studios; Nadiadwala Grandson Entertainment	₹194.60 crore	
Yeh Jawaani Hai Deewani	31 May 2013	Dharma Productions	₹188.57 crore	

== Dubbed films ==
The following is the list of top 10 Hindi-language dubbed versions by domestic net collection:

*	Denotes films still running in theaters

Film	Release date	Original language	Studio(s)/Producers	Domestic net	Ref(s)
Pushpa 2: The Rule	5 December 2024	Telugu	Mythri Movie Makers; Sukumar Writings	₹830.10 crore	
Baahubali 2: The Conclusion	28 April 2017	Telugu	Arka Media Works	₹510.99 crore	
KGF: Chapter 2	14 April 2022	Kannada	Hombale Films	₹434.70 crore	
Kalki 2898 AD	27 June 2024	Telugu	Vyjayanthi Movies	₹294.25 crore	
RRR	25 March 2022	Telugu	DVV Entertainment	₹274.31 crore	
Kantara: Chapter 1	2 October 2025	Kannada	Hombale Films	₹224.39 crore	
2.0	29 November 2018	Tamil	Lyca Productions	₹189.55 crore	
Mahavatar Narsimha	25 July 2025	Multiple (Note: There is no clear evidence of primary language. The film's main languages are deemed to be Hindi, Kannada, Tamil and Telugu according to the Indian film censorship body.)	Kleem Productions; Hombale Films	₹182.83 crore	
Salaar: Part 1 – Ceasefire	22 December 2023	Telugu	Hombale Films	₹153.84 crore	
Toxic	26 August 2026	Kannada	KVN Productions; Monster Mind Creations	₹149.28 crore	

== Highest domestic net collection by year ==
The following list shows India's highest-domestic net collection of Hindi films by year.

*	Denotes films still running in theaters

Year	Film	Studio(s)/Producers	Domestic net	Ref(s)
2026	Dhurandhar: The Revenge	Jio Studios; B62 Studios	₹1,108.09 crore	
2025	Dhurandhar	Jio Studios; B62 Studios	₹895.96 crore	
2024	Stree 2	Maddock Films; Jio Studios	₹627.02 crore	
2023	Jawan	Red Chillies Entertainment	₹643.87 crore	
2022	Brahmāstra: Part One – Shiva	Dharma Productions; Star Studios	₹257.44 crore	
2021	Sooryavanshi	Reliance Entertainment; Rohit Shetty Picturez; Dharma Productions; Cape of Good Films	₹196 crore	
2020	Tanhaji	T-Series; Ajay Devgn FFilms	₹279.55 crore	
2019	War	Yash Raj Films	₹317.91 crore	
2018	Sanju	Vinod Chopra Films; Rajkumar Hirani	₹342.53 crore	
2017	Tiger Zinda Hai	Yash Raj Films	₹339.16 crore	
2016	Dangal	Walt Disney Pictures; Aamir Khan Productions; UTV Motion Pictures	₹387.38 crore	
2015	Bajrangi Bhaijaan	Salman Khan Films; Kabir Khan Films	₹320.34 crore	
2014	PK	Vinod Chopra Films; Rajkumar Hirani Films	₹340.80 crore	
2013	Dhoom 3	Yash Raj Films	₹284.27 crore	
2012	Ek Tha Tiger	Yash Raj Films	₹198.88 crore	
2011	Bodyguard	Reel Life Productions	₹148.86 crore	
2010	Dabangg	Arbaaz Khan Productions	₹138.88 crore	
2009	3 Idiots	Vinod Chopra Films	₹202.95 crore	
2008	Ghajini	Geetha Arts	₹114 crore	
2007	Om Shanti Om	Red Chillies Entertainment	₹78.17 crore	
2006	Dhoom 2	Yash Raj Films	₹81.01 crore	
2005	No Entry	Salman Khan Films	₹44.72 crore	
2004	Veer-Zaara	Yash Raj Films	₹41.86 crore	
2003	Koi... Mil Gaya	Filmkraft Productions Pvt. Ltd	₹47.20 crore	
2002	Devdas	Mega Bollywood Pvt.Ltd.	₹41.65 crore	
2001	Gadar: Ek Prem Katha	Zee Telefilms	₹76.88 crore	
2000	Kaho Naa... Pyaar Hai	Filmkraft Productions Pvt. Ltd	₹44.28 crore	
1999	Hum Saath-Saath Hain	Rajshri Productions	₹42 crore	
1998	Kuch Kuch Hota Hai	Dharma Productions	₹45.25 crore	
1997	Border	J. P. Films	₹40 crore	
1996	Raja Hindustani	Cineyug	₹43 crore	
1995	Dilwale Dulhania Le Jayenge	Yash Raj Films	₹56 crore	
1994	Hum Aapke Hain Koun..!	Rajshri Productions	₹72.48 crore	
1993	Aankhen	Chiragdeep International	₹14 crore	
1992	Beta	Maruti International	₹13 crore	
1991	Saajan	Eros Entertainment	₹10 crore	
1990	Dil	Maruti International	₹10 crore	
1989	Maine Pyar Kiya	Rajshri Productions	₹18 crore	
1988	Tezaab	N. Chandra	₹8 crore	
1987	Hukumat	Shantketan Films	₹5.50 crore	
1986	Karma	Subhash Ghai	₹7 crore	
1985	Mard	Manmohan Desai	₹10 crore	
1984	Tohfa	Suresh Productions	₹4.50 crore	
1983	Betaab	Vijayta Films	₹13.50 crore	
1982	Vidhaata	Trimurti Films	₹8 crore	
1981	Kranti	Manoj Kumar	₹10 crore	
1980	Qurbani	F.K. International	₹6 crore	
1979	Suhaag	Sharma Cine Associates	₹5 crore	
1978	Muqaddar Ka Sikandar	Prakash Mehra Productions	₹8.50 crore	
1977	Dharam Veer	Hirawat Jain & Co.	₹8 crore	
1976	Dus Numbri	Seven Arts Pictures	₹4.50 crore	
1975	Sholay	United Producers; Sippy Films	₹15 crore	
1974	Roti Kapda Aur Makaan	Vishal International Productions	₹5.25 crore	
1973	Bobby	R. K. Films	₹5.50 crore	
1972	Seeta Aur Geeta	Sippy Films	₹3.25 crore	
1971	Haathi Mere Saathi	Sandow M. M. A. Chinnappa Thevar; Devar Films	₹3.50 crore	
1970	Johny Mera Naam	Mehboob Studio	₹4 crore	
1969	Aradhana	Shakti Films	₹3.50 crore	
1968	Ankhen	Ramanand Sagar	₹3.25 crore	
1967	Upkar	Harkishen R. Mirchandani	₹3.50 crore	
1966	Phool Aur Patthar	O. P. Ralhan	₹2.75 crore	
1965	Waqt	Yash Raj Films	₹3 crore	
1964	Sangam	R. K. Films	₹4 crore	
1963	Mere Mehboob	Harnam Singh Rawail	₹3 crore	
1962	Bees Saal Baad	Hemant Kumar	₹1.50 crore	
1961	Gunga Jumna	Mehboob Studio; Filmistan Ltd; Citizen Films	₹3.50 crore	
1960	Mughal-e-Azam	Sterling Investment Corporation	₹5.50 crore	
1959	Anari	Hrishikesh Mukherjee	₹1.50 crore	
1958	Madhumati	Bimal Roy Productions	₹2 crore	
1957	Mother India	Mehboob Studio	₹4 crore	
1956	C.I.D.	Guru Dutt	₹1.25 crore	
1955	Shree 420	R. K. Films	₹2 crore	
1954	Nagin	Filmistan Ltd	₹1.50 crore	
1953	Anarkali	Filmistan Ltd	₹1.25 crore	
1952	Aan	Mehboob Khan; Mehboob Studio	₹1.50 crore	
1951	Awaara	R. K. Films; All India Film Corporation	₹1.25 crore	
1950	Samadhi	Filmistan Ltd	₹75 lakh	
1949	Barsaat	R.K. films	₹1.10 crore	
1948	Shaheed	Filmistan Ltd	₹75 lakh	
1947	Jugnu	Shaukat Art Production	₹50 lakh	
1946	Anmol Ghadi	Mehboob Khan; Mehboob Studio	₹1 crore	
1945	Zeenat	Shaukat Art Production	₹70 lakh	
1944	Rattan	Dewan Productions	₹1 crore	
1943	Kismet	Bombay Talkies	₹1 crore	
1942	Basant	Amiya Chakrabarty	₹80 lakh	
1941	Khazanchi	Pancholi Art Pictures	₹70 lakh	
1940	Zindagi	New Theatres Ltd.	₹55 lakh	

== See also ==
- 100 Crore Club
- 1000 Crore Club
- List of highest-grossing films in India
- List of highest-grossing Hindi films
- List of highest-grossing South Indian Films
