= Article 370 (film) =

2024 Indian Hindi action film on the abolishion of Kashmir's special status

- Theatrical release poster
- Directed by: Aditya Suhas Jambhale
- Written by: Aditya Dhar; Aditya Suhas Jambhale; Arjun Dhawan; Monal Thaakar
- Story by: Aditya Dhar; Monal Thaakar
- Produced by: Jyoti Deshpande; Aditya Dhar; Lokesh Dhar
- Starring: Yami Gautam Dhar; Priyamani
- Narrated by: Ajay Devgn
- Cinematography: Siddharth Deena Vasani
- Edited by: Shivkumar V. Panicker
- Music by: Shashwat Sachdev
- Production companies: B62 Studios; Jio Studios
- Distributed by: PVR Inox Pictures
- Release date: 23 February 2024
- Running time: 158 minutes
- Country: India
- Language: Hindi
- Budget: ₹20 crore
- Box office: ₹110.57 crore

Article 370 is a 2024 Indian Hindi-language political action thriller film directed by Aditya Suhas Jambhale, who co-wrote the film with Aditya Dhar, Monal Thaakar and Arjun Dhawan. Produced by Jyoti Deshpande, Aditya Dhar, and Lokesh Dhar, the film stars Yami Gautam Dhar and Priyamani, alongside Skand Thakur, Ashwini Kaul, Vaibhav Tatwawadi, Arun Govil, and Kiran Karmarkar. It is based on the 2019 revocation of the special status to Jammu and Kashmir granted in Article 370 of the Constitution of India.

The film was released worldwide on 23 February 2024. It grossed over ₹110 crore at the box office against the budget of ₹20 crore. Reviewers praised the direction, narrative style and Gautam Dhar's performance. However, the film was criticised for distortion of facts and depicting a narrative favouring the ruling Bharatiya Janata Party in the run-up to the 2024 general elections, with some critics describing it as propaganda.

Article 370 received 8 nominations at the 70th Filmfare Awards including Best Film, Best Director (Jambhale) and Best Actress (Gautam Dhar), winning the award for Best Story. At the 72nd National Film Awards, it won three awards : Best Feature Film, Best Actress (Gautam Dhar) and Best Music Direction (Shashwat Sachdev).

== Plot ==
The film is divided into six chapters.

=== Chapter 1: The Lover Boy of Tral ===
NIA officer Zooni Haskar poses as a manicurist to blackmail Sabia, the girlfriend of terrorist leader Burhan Wani into providing information about his whereabouts. Using it, she leads a successful operation with support from friend and CRPF officer Yash Chauhan to eliminate him without authorization from her superiors. This provides separatist leader Yakub Shiekh and his allies an opportunity to portray him as a martyr, and they launch agitation across the state, as well as replacing Wani with another terrorist leader, Zakir Naikoo. The worsening law and order situation causes Zooni to be reprimanded and transferred to New Delhi.

=== Chapter 2: A Knock on the Door ===
Rajeshwari Swaminathan, the Joint Secretary at the PMO (Prime Minister's Office) meets with Jagmohan Patil, former Governor of Kashmir, to discuss abrogating Article 370. She brings the NIA into Kashmir to stabilise the situation. Later, Zooni meets Salahuddin Jalal (based on Omar Abdullah) in Delhi. Jalal mentions Zooni's father, Kabir, a whistleblower, who was found dead. The Government of India was unable to investigate due to Article 370. Rajeshwari meets with Zooni, trying to convince her to go back to Kashmir. She accepts the offer under the condition that two more people can be on the team.

=== Chapter 3: Blindspot ===
Zooni meets her team in Srinagar which includes Namita Chaturvedi, an Assistant Enforcement Officer for the ED, Gaurang Sengupta, a Financial Crime Consultant for the CBI, Ashish Mattoo, and her two requested members. Shamsher Abdali is identified as a primary suspect for the funding of a stone-pelting incident in Anantnag. They decide to investigate his dry fruit business, raiding his warehouse and killing his contractor. After hacking his phone call history, they identify Abdali, who is both an ISI agent and double agent working for Khawar, a former senior of Zooni. Zooni and the CRPF manage to secure Abdali. Jalal and Parveena Andrabi (loosely based on Mehbooba Mufti) try to form a coalition government and gain control of the Valley. However, the fax machine at the Indian ministry doesn't work, and the President's rule is imposed on Kashmir, foiling their plans. Tragedy strikes when Chauhan is killed in the 2019 Pulwama attack.

=== Chapter 4: Save the Date ===
Grief-stricken and enraged, Zooni captures and interrogates Yakub Sheikh. He is chained to a chair and refuses to talk to her colleagues. Then she arrives and throws him out the window, (holding the chair) and threatening to drop it if he does not speak. Out of fear, he reveals that the mastermind of the bombing was Naikoo and she thus has Khawar removed from his position for, once again, unwittingly aiding the separatists. The government decides to work on abrogating Article 370 as Zooni recovers a vital document hidden in a Kashmir library, integral in removing it. She finds out that a sub-clause 'd' is removed due to historical reasons.

=== Chapter 5: Sub-clause (d) ===
After Rajeshwari briefs the Prime Minister, Zooni's team studies the Constitution and searches for loopholes that will allow the government to enact this law. They make preparations for handling the numerous problems that can occur in the valley, as well as potential retaliation by Pakistan, neighboring countries and terrorist organizations. They also attempt the suppressing of all forms of social unrest that could be created, arresting all anti-Indian elements in the valley including Sheikh's fellow conspirators and separatist leaders as well as keeping the mission a secret from the media, whom they confuse with multiple fake stories, and even tricking the Pakistani military, something Khawar helps them with.

=== Chapter 6: It Was, It Is, and It Always Will Be ===
The PM works on passing the bill in the Rajya Sabha, where his party is in minority and faces challenges from the opposition party members, while maintaining that Kashmir is a part of India and they can remove the special status. Zooni and her team uncover Naikoo's plan to kill Jalal as a way to discredit the Indian Government and invite sanctions. As Gaurang poses as Jalal, they leave for a safe house in a convoy which is then attacked by Naikoo and his men, whom the CRPF forces engage with and defeat. The bill passes just as Zooni kills Naikoo, avenging Chauhan as Article 370 is abrogated.

The PM, Home Minister, Rajeshwari and the NIA team celebrate their victory and mourn those lost in the fight. Zooni finds peace as her father's case file is reopened for investigation. The end credits show real-life photos of the peace and progress that has since taken place in Kashmir after the abrogation of Article 370.

== Cast ==
- Yami Gautam Dhar as NIA officer Zooni Haksar
- Priyamani as PMO Joint Secretary Rajeshwari Swaminathan
- Raj Arjun as ID Station Chief of Srinagar, Khawar Ali
- Shivam Khajuria as Burhan Wani
- Vaibhav Tatwawadi as Deputy Commandant CRPF Yash Chauhan
- Arun Govil as the Prime Minister of India (based on Narendra Modi)
- Raj Zutshi as Former Chief Minister of Jammu and Kashmir Salahuddin Jalal (based on Omar Abdullah)
- Divya Seth as Chief Minister of Jammu and Kashmir Parveena Andrabi (based on Mehbooba Mufti)
- Kiran Karmarkar as the Home Minister of India Madhav Patel (based on Amit Shah)
- Sumit Kaul as Yakub Shaikh (based on Yasin Malik)
- Iravati Harshe as Brinda Ghosh (based on Nidhi Razdan)
- Mohan Agashe as Former Governor of Jammu and Kashmir Jagmohan Patil (based on Jagmohan)
- Skand Sanjeev Thakur as Wasim Abbasi
- Ashwini Koul as Zakir Naikoo (based on Riyaz Naikoo)
- Ashwini Kumar as Ashish Mattoo
- Asit Redij as Rohit Thappar (based on Gulam Nabi Azad)
- Jaya Virlley as Pranjali
- Sanya Sagar as Namita Chaturvedi
- Rajiv Kumar as Shamsher Abdali
- Mithil Shah as Siddharth
- B. Shantanu as the Vice-President of India (based on Venkaiah Naidu)
- Ajay Shankar as Gaurang Sengupta
- Toshir Nalwat as Pa Mohsin
- Sukhita Aiyar as Anuradha Pattnaik
- Sandeep Chatterjee as ISI Chief

== Soundtrack ==
The music of the film is composed by Shashwat Sachdev with lyrics written by Osho Jain, Sudhanshu Saria, Kumaar and Shashwat Sachdev.

== Release ==
The film was released worldwide on 23 February 2024 and premiered on Netflix on 19 April 2024.

== Box office ==
As of 11 April 2024, Article 370 has grossed ₹98.06 crore (US$10 million) in India, with a further ₹12.51 crore (US$1.3 million) in overseas, for a worldwide total of ₹110.57 crore (US$11 million).

== Reception ==
On the review aggregator website Rotten Tomatoes, 83% of 6 critics' reviews are positive, with an average rating of 6.7/10.

=== Critical reception ===
Devesh Sharma of Filmfare gave 3.5 out of 5 stars and stated that "the film is a cracker of an action film and if one doesn't dwell on its political stance much, can be thoroughly enjoyed as an action thriller." Abhishek Srivastava of The Times of India also rated 3.5 out of 5 stars and stated that "Article 370 remains engaging for the most part" and that the film "proves to be a worthwhile watch, offering enough substance to keep viewers engaged and invested". Monika Rawal Kukreja of Hindustan Times wrote that "Article 370 underlines one of the most crucial chapters in our nation's history. With an impressive writing, simple narrative and outstanding direction, it effortlessly manages to send across the message it intends to".

Mukund Setlur, writing for the Deccan Herald gave a rating of 2.5/5 and added that "While elements of drama and action are aplenty, the film lacks the intelligence and the genuineness needed to sustain a conversation."

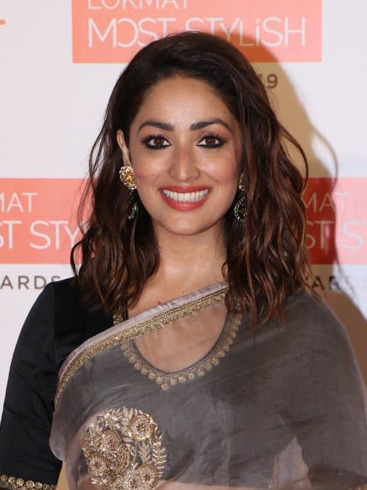
Critics praised the performance of Yami Gautam Dhar

Calling it a "hard-hitting political drama", Titas Chowdhury of CNN-News18 rated 3.5 out of 5 stars, and stated that "the makers waste no time and dive into the crux of the story in the first half and it makes for a fast-paced experience till the point of intermission. It's the second half of the film that appears stretched out". Lachmi Deb Roy of Firstpost awarded 3 out of 5, calling it a "compelling narrative that informs and engages without making it look like a history and civics lesson" Asmita Pant of CNBC TV18 wrote that "the film offers a grounded perspective on the Kashmir issue. It delves deep into emotions but never interrupts the story's flow", and that "the filmmakers have eschewed sensationalism" and created a "narrative infused with cinematic flair".

Sana Farzeen of India Today rated 3 out of 5 stars and added that "Article 370 is a well-made film but will test your patience with its run-time of 2 hours and 40 minutes", also noted that the film is "tuned to the propaganda value" for the ruling government. Shalini Langer of The Indian Express rated 2.5/5 and added that the film "serves its politics unabashedly as it mixes facts with fiction".

A critic from Bollywood Hungama gave 3.5 out of 5 stars and called it "a gripping tale that attempts to depict an important chapter of India’s history in an entertaining and simple manner." Rohit Bhatnagar of The Free Press Journal rated 3 in a scale of 5, stating that "Yami Gautam’s film voices truth but in a textbook manner ... Away from the picking political sides or even having his own ideology in place, Aditya sheds light on what had happened and that’s like cherry on top". Abhimanyu Mathur of Daily News and Analysis awarded 3.5 out of 5 stars, and said that "it is a technically well-made film, packed with great performances, seamless direction, and a solid background score"; it "excels when it is being a thriller", however, "the film falters when it tries to get political. Because at this point, it resorts to boring tropes, caricatures, and over-the-top acting".

== Factual accuracy and political messaging ==
The film is focused on Article 370 of the Constitution of India which granted special autonomous status to the region of Jammu and Kashmir. However, critics have described the movie as "factually incorrect" and a “distortion” of facts.

Indian PM Narendra Modi had endorsed the movie and claimed it to be a source of "correct information", however, producer Aditya Dhar clarified that the movie is not a factual account but a work of fiction inspired by the actual events. The movie is seen by some as a "thinly veiled propaganda film" that favours India's ruling Bharatiya Janta Party in order to bring political mileage for it during the upcoming 2024 Indian general elections. The movie was made tax-free in two of the BJP governed states, Madhya Pradesh and Chhattisgarh. The film screening in different states was attended by the BJP leaders and in some instances they campaigned for the movie and the elections.

The film has been noted for having numerous factual inaccuracies, and one-sided narrative. It blames the Indian PM Jawaharlal Nehru for delaying the accession of Jammu and Kashmir until Sheikh Abdullah was allowed power. At the same time, the film is silent on the BJP's coalition government with the Jammu and Kashmir People's Democratic Party. Critics said the film's treatment of the Kashmiri movement for autonomy aligns with the ruling government's narrative as it is depicted as being made up of corrupt, caricatured politicians, brainwashed militants, and paid stone-pelters, all controlled by Pakistan without any capacity for independent thought. Some reviewers said that the film normalises custodial beating and torture by presenting it as a necessary act against those who are "deserving it" and that it further shows contempt to the institutions of democracy including the opposition and the journalists.

Others pointed out that the film ignored Jammu and Ladakh, other constituent regions of the former state which supported the abrogation of article 370, with sole focus on the Kashmir Valley.

== Accolades ==
| Year | Award | Category | Nominee/Work | Result | Ref. |
|---|---|---|---|---|---|
| 2025 | 25th IIFA Awards | Best Film | Article 370 | Nominated | |
| 2025 | 25th IIFA Awards | Best Director | Aditya Suhas Jambhale | Nominated | |
| 2025 | 25th IIFA Awards | Best Actress | Yami Gautam | Nominated | |
| 2025 | 25th IIFA Awards | Best Supporting Actress | Priyamani | Nominated | |
| 2025 | 25th IIFA Awards | Best Male Playback Singer | Jubin Nautiyal for "Dua" | Won | |
| 2025 | 25th IIFA Awards | Best Dialogue | Arjun Dhawan, Aditya Dhar, Aditya Suhas Jambhale, Monal Thaakar | Won | |
| 2025 | 70th Filmfare Awards | Best Film | Article 370 | Nominated | ` |
| 2025 | 70th Filmfare Awards | Best Director | Aditya Suhas Jambhale | Nominated | ` |
| 2025 | 70th Filmfare Awards | Best Debut Director | Aditya Suhas Jambhale | Nominated | ` |
| 2025 | 70th Filmfare Awards | Best Actress | Yami Gautam | Nominated | ` |
| 2025 | 70th Filmfare Awards | Best Supporting Actress | Priyamani | Nominated | ` |
| 2025 | 70th Filmfare Awards | Best Story | Aditya Dhar and Monal Thaakar | Won | ` |
| 2025 | 70th Filmfare Awards | Best Screenplay | Aditya Dhar, Aditya Suhas Jambhale, Arjun Dhawan, Monal Thaakar | Nominated | ` |
| 2025 | 70th Filmfare Awards | Best Costume Design | Veera Kapoor EE | Nominated | ` |
| 2024 | 72nd National Film Awards | Best Film | Article 370 | Won | |
| 2024 | 72nd National Film Awards | Best Actress | Yami Gautam | Won | |
| 2024 | 72nd National Film Awards | Best Music Director | Shashwat Sachdev | Won | |
