= Glow & Lovely =

Skin whitening cream popular in the Indian subcontinent

- Type: Cosmetic product
- Inception: 1975
- Manufacturer: Hindustan Unilever
- Available: Yes
- Website: https://www.hul.co.in/brands/beauty-wellbeing/glow-lovely/

Glow & Lovely (formerly Fair & Lovely) is an Indian skin-lightening cosmetic product of Hindustan Unilever introduced to the market in India in 1975. Glow & Lovely is available in India, Bangladesh, Malaysia, Indonesia, Singapore, Brunei, Thailand, Sri Lanka, Pakistan, Mauritius and other parts of Asia and is also exported to other parts of the world, such as the West, where it is sold in Asian supermarkets.

Tube of Glow & Lovely (with the former branding) showing the branding and face of Yami Gautam.

Unilever patented the brand Fair & Lovely in 1971, after the patenting of niacinamide, a melanin suppressor, which is the cream's main active ingredient. Glow & Lovely's website states the product contains vitamins B3, C, and E, along with multivitamins and UVB/UVA sunscreens.

Glow & Lovely was controversial under its previous name "Fair & Lovely". The company has faced criticism for its marketing practices and has announced changes to advertising and packaging in South Asia to address concerns. The president of the company responded to concerns about the product calling for diverse representation, and has announced changes in advertising, communication and packaging in South Asia.

== Market Share ==
The target demographic for Glow & Lovely is the 18 and above age group, and the bulk of the users are in the age 21–35 category, though there is evidence that girls as young as 12–14 also use the cream. As of 2012 the brand occupied 80% of the lightening cream market in India and is one of Hindustan Unilever's most successful cosmetics lines.

== Formula ==
Glow & Lovely offers a range of product formulations including lotions, gels and soaps. According to Glow & Lovely's website the product uses vitamin B3, glycerine, UVA and UVB sunscreens in its formula. Glow & Lovely has also announced the addition of vitamins C, B6, E and allantoin to their product.

== Health concerns ==
Glow & Lovely is widely considered to be a skin lightening cream, and skin lightening which is done for cosmetic reasons is sometimes associated with negative impacts on well-being.

== Advertisement issues and criticism ==
Glow & Lovely suffered controversy under its previous name "Fair & Lovely". Aggressive marketing campaigns in India are shown to use Bollywood celebrities to promote 'fair' as beautiful and 'dark' as ugly, leading critics to charge the firm with promoting colourism. Fairness cream brand promotions in the Indian market use the same method of advertising, ridiculing a young girl for having dark skin and not doing enough to lighten it, pointing to the cream as the needed solution.

Advertisements target middle to lower income groups of whom 20% to 30% buy skin lightening products over the counter, through friends, or online, without consulting a specialist. Those who may not have a lot of income cannot opt to go for products that are expensive. Nor are they able to speak with specialists that may guide them in their skincare. So they opt to buy the first product they find, in this case 'Glow & Lovely.'

Marketing campaigns of the product have been criticized for promoting colorism. Marketing for the product in all countries implies that whiter skin equates to beauty and self-confidence. Hindustan Unilever Limited research claims that "90 per cent of Indian women want to use whiteners because it is aspirational, like losing weight. A fair skin is, like education, regarded as a social and economic step up." Following this controversy, in a 2007 television advertisement for Ponds White Beauty, actor Saif Ali Khan expressed preference for the fair-skinned Neha Dhupia over the darker-skinned Priyanka Chopra. The company suspended television advertisements for the product.

=== Company response and rebranding ===
In 2020, the manufacturer responded to criticism associating the product with colorism. Sunny Jain, President Beauty & Personal Care stated the company recognizes that the use of the words 'fair', 'white' and 'light' is not ideal. Jain also announced changes in advertising, communication and packaging in South Asia. Glow & Lovely also announced in 2020, they plan to feature women of different skin tones, representative of the variety of beauty across India and other countries.

In 2020, Hindustan Unilever announced the rebranding of its flagship brand Fair & Lovely, removing the word 'Fair' and using 'Glow' instead. The brand was renamed to 'Glow & Lovely'.

At the time of the rebranding, Unilever stated that 'Fair & Lovely has never been, and is not, a skin bleaching product', instead it was intended to be a product which would 'improve skin barrier function, improve skin firmness, and smooth out skin texture'.

=== Critical response to rebranding ===
Critics responded to the rebranding by criticizing the continuing sale of the product and expressing concerns that changing the name of the product does not address how colorism is still prevalent in the community. Former Procter and Gamble executive Alex Malouf stated, "None of these companies has said we're going to discontinue these products, despite the reputational challenge." Critic and activist Mirusha Yogarajah stated in response to Unilever's announcement, "If you're changing the advertising to where they're not promoting light skin, that's reasonable, but if you're still selling the product, that doesn't mean much".
