= Dhoom Dhaam (2025 film) =

2025 Indian film by Rishab Seth

- Official release poster
- Directed by: Rishab Seth
- Written by: Aarsh Vora; Aditya Dhar
- Produced by: Jyoti Deshpande; Aditya Dhar; Lokesh Dhar
- Starring: Yami Gautam Dhar; Pratik Gandhi
- Cinematography: Siddharth Vasani
- Edited by: Shivkumar V. Panicker
- Music by: Clinton Cerejo; Bianca Gomes (Shor Police)
- Production companies: Jio Studios; B62 Studios
- Distributed by: Netflix
- Release date: 14 February 2025
- Running time: 108 minutes
- Country: India
- Language: Hindi

Dhoom Dhaam (transl. Fanfare) is a 2025 Indian Hindi-language romantic action comedy film directed by Rishab Seth and produced by Jyoti Deshpande, Aditya Dhar, and Lokesh Dhar under Jio Studios and B62 Studios. The film stars Yami Gautam Dhar and Pratik Gandhi. It was released on Netflix on 14 February 2025 to mixed reviews from critics.

== Plot ==
Veer Poddar, who by nature is a soft-spoken, timid, shy veterinarian, visits along with his parents, his potential future life-partner, Koyal Chadda, who, by nature, is a bold, rough, tough, outgoing girl for an 'arranged marriage' discussion evening. In the meeting, the parents of the boy and the girl lie to one another, saying diametrically opposite things about Veer and Koyal, much to their discomfiture, and get the marriage arranged.

Veer goes to a shopping mall and buys a lot of gifts for his bride. In the mall, Koyal's uncle, Kushwant Kapoor, collides with Veer accidentally, has some small talk, and leaves. Veer then leaves the mall with many large shopping bags filled with gifts, flowers, etc., which he delivers to Koyal's house. As soon as the bags are placed on the floor, Koyal's dog knocks them over and starts eating some spilled things from the bags, such as the lilies. Startled, Veer smiles politely and leaves.

The wedding has just been completed. Veer and Koyal are seated on the bed in a hotel room, about to start their Suhaag Raat. Koyal gets a call from her family saying that their family dog has not had a bowel movement in two days, and whether she can get any medicines prescribed by her Veterinarian husband. Koyal gets annoyed and says she cannot ask her husband about that right now and ends the call. A bit later, they are interrupted by the doorbell. Two men barge in, grab Veer, and demand 'Where is Charlie?'. Completely taken aback, Veer politely says he does not know of any Charlie and asks them if they are in the wrong room.

They refuse to leave, and keep asking for it, and suddenly one of them holds up a gun. It is Koyal who quickly hurls a pot of boiling water from the tea kettle right on his face, making him lose control, and grabs the gun. After threatening them with that gun and evicting them from the room, she manages to escape from the hotel along with Veer, who looks stunned at her lightning reflexes. A car chase ensues, and seeing that Veer is driving too slow under the circumstances, Koyal jumps on his lap and drives like a movie stunt actor through Mumbai city streets at breakneck speed and manages an escape. They both quickly realize they are a mismatched pair.

A series of events unfolds on the same night in search of the enigmatic 'Charlie'. The couple later finds out that the so-called 'Charlie' is, in reality, a thumb drive containing some dark secrets. It is revealed that the drive contains the video footage of an armed robbery that was caught by the surveillance camera from Koyal's uncle Kapoor's shop, which he tried to report to the police. The corrupt Inspector Sanjay Rebeiro tried to hide the crime and kill him. Then somehow, the Central Intelligence Department (CID) got involved, which is also trying to get the same drive to catch the corrupt cops and the gangs. This results in multiple groups: the criminal gang, the corrupt Sanjay's gang, and the CID, all fighting to recover the evidence. The drive was dropped by Koyal's desperate uncle, running from Sanjay's gang, into the shopping bag that Veer was carrying. (shown at the beginning of the movie).

Throughout the night, the couple is chased relentlessly by different people. But the couple has no clue, and they keep escaping from the gangs. Once they are told about Uncle Kapoor's mall incident, they go to various people, one by one, who may have received the gift bags they gave away, in search of 'Charlie'. During the search, the night also reveals many unpleasant secrets... That Koyal had a relationship with a boyfriend before the marriage, that she had a raunchy bachelorette party involving some guys the night before the wedding, etc. Veer is shocked at the discovery of all the dark secrets.

With so many secrets about each other being discovered in a single night that make them incompatible, Veer and Koyal painfully agree to divorce, once the dust has settled on this matter.

Going from place to place and not finding 'Charlie' anywhere, Veer at last figures out that it was Koyal's dog, while foraging through the stuff from the bags, that had accidentally swallowed the thumb drive. That now makes sense since the dog has a problem defecating. The couple is chased again and again.

In the climax, Ribeiro's gang manages to abduct and tie up Koyal and uncle Kapoor inside a large old warehouse. However, even the normally timid Veer, is forced to improvise and perform many clumsy fight moves to try and save Koyal. The good team from the CID, also joins just in time to capture the entire gang of Ribeiro. In the final scene, Veer administers laxatives for the dog, which safely defecates the thumb drive. The evidence has been recovered!

The long and turbulent night has not only caused them despair and anger at each other, but in the end, surprisingly, some reconciliation as well, since they also discovered some things to like about each other. They reconcile and decide to continue to live as a couple after all!

== Cast ==
- Yami Gautam Dhar as Koyal Chadha
- Pratik Gandhi as Veer Poddar
- Eijaz Khan as Sathe
- Pavitra Sarkar as Bhide
- Babla Kochar as Gulshan Chadha
- Neelu Kohli as Nandini Chadha
- Veronika Arora as Peehu
- Dharmesh Vyas as Vedant Poddar
- Nimisha Vakharia as Suhasini Poddar
- Kavin Dave as Khushwant Kapoor
- Mukul Chadda as Sanjay Reberio
- Swapnil Dhongde as Police Constable
- Kuldeep Sharma as Police Constable
- Prateik Babbar as Arya
- Mushtaq Khan as Watchman
- Sahil Gangurde as Mukesh
- Sanaya Pithawalla as Suhana
- Mustafa Ahmed as Sunny

== Production ==
Principal photography took place in Mumbai.

== Music ==
Dhoom Dhaam

Soundtrack album by Clinton Cerejo and Bionca Gomes (Shor Police)
- Released: 11 February 2025
- Recorded: 2023–24
- Genre: Feature film soundtrack
- Length: 19:57
- Language: Hindi
- Label: Panorama Music

The music of the film is composed by Clinton Cerejo and Bionca Gomes (Shor Police), with lyrics written by Siddhant Kaushal.

| No. | Title | Singer(s) | Length |
|---|---|---|---|
| 1. | "Silsila" | Arijit Singh, Jonita Gandhi | 3:03 |
| 2. | "How are You" | Clinton Cerejo, Benny Dayal, Asees Kaur, Romy | 3:16 |
| 3. | "Haseeno" | Vishal Dadlani, Neuman Pinto | 4:00 |
| 4. | "Chanchal" | Sudeep Jaipurwale | 3:21 |
| 5. | "Kanda Chubha" | Sonu Kakkar | 3:09 |
| 6. | "Madman on the Run" | Bianca Gomes | 3:08 |
| Total length: | | | 19:57 |

== Reception ==
=== Critical reception ===
On the review aggregator website Rotten Tomatoes, 56% of 16 critics' reviews are positive, with an average rating of 5.4/10.

Shubhra Gupta of The Indian Express gave 2 stars out of and said that "If you married Iss Raat Ki Subah Nahin with a zillion iterations of the odd-couple and lovers-on-the-run and heist movies, you would get Yami Gautam-Pratik Gandhi film". Saibal Chatterjee of NDTV also gave 2 stars and writes in his review that "Full marks to Yami Gautam and Pratik Gandhi for gamely trying to spice up a desultory ride."

Zenia Bandyopadhyay of India Today rated the film three and a half out of five stars, stating, "It serves up romance at its heart but throws in generous dollops of thrill, action, and comedy to make it the perfect all-rounder.".

Devesh Sharma of Filmfare rated the film three out of five stars, describing it as "Dhoom Dhaam is an action comedy which coasts on the comic timing of its leads, Yami Gautam and Pratik Gandhi." Pallavi Keswani of The Hindu reviewed the film, stating, "‘Dhoom Dhaam’’s concept is none too innovative, but it does contain some potential for experimentation – unfortunately, most of it is ignored".

Archika Khurana of The Times of India rated the film three and a half stars out of five stars, writing, "Dhoom Dhaam is an all-out entertainer. A perfect pick for Valentine’s Day, this film delivers high drama, nonstop laughter, and endless surprises, keeping you hooked from start to finish!."

Rishabh Suri of Hindustan Times reviewed the film, describing it as "Yami Gautam and Pratik Gandhi's comic thriller remains predictable and average." Rishil Jogani of Pinkvilla rated the film three and a half out of five stars and said in his review that "The chemistry between Yami Gautam Dhar and Pratik Gandhi is undeniably one of the film’s highlights. Their playful banter and mutual support make them a couple worth rooting for. The film’s ability to deliver a thrilling yet lighthearted experience, coupled with its high production values, makes it a delightful popcorn entertainer that doesn’t demand overthinking.".

== See also ==
- List of Netflix India originals
