= Bhasha Sumbli =

Indian actress

- Born: August 6, 1988 (age 38); Sumbal, Jammu & Kashmir, India
- Education: National School of Drama, New Delhi
- Occupation: Actress
- Years active: 2020–present
- Spouse: Sunil Soni

Bhasha Sumbli is an Indian actress who appears predominantly in Hindi films. She is best known for her pivotal roles of Sharda Pandit in The Kashmir Files and Gulnar Sayyed in Baramulla.

== Personal life ==
Bhasha Sumbli was born on 6 August 1988 in Sumbal, Jammu and Kashmir into a Kashmiri Pandit family. Sumbli's family were forced to flee their home in Kashmir and had to settle in Delhi due to the exodus of Kashmiri Hindus in 1990s. Both of Sumbli's parents are poets.

== Filmography ==
Year	Title	Role	Ref.
2020	Chhapaak	Babbu's sister	
2022	The Kashmir Files	Sharda Pandit	
2023	Mandali	Rashmi Choubey	
2025	Baramulla	Gulnaar Sayyed	
2026	Dhurandhar: The Revenge	Lawyer Veena	
