= Aditya Dhar =

Indian filmmaker (born 1983)

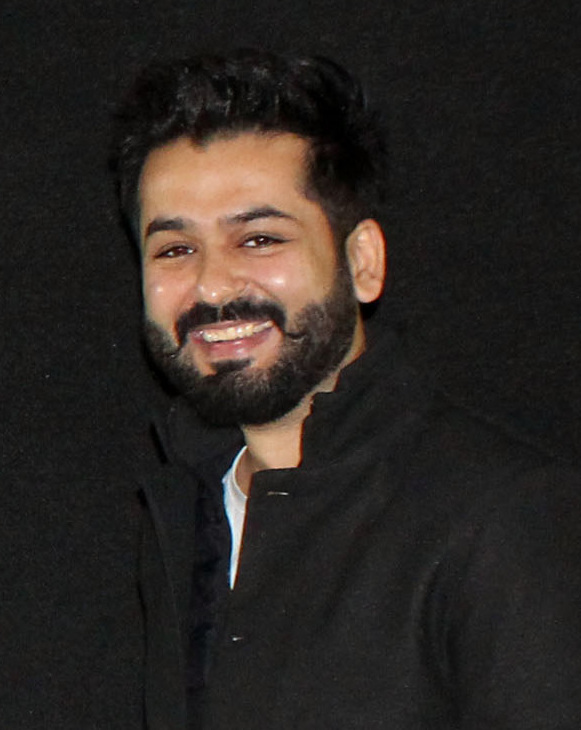
- Dhar in 2019
- Born: 12 March 1983 (age 43); New Delhi, India
- Education: Delhi University
- Occupations: Film director; screenwriter; film producer; lyricist
- Years active: 2006–present
- Notable work: Uri: The Surgical Strike; Dhurandhar; Dhurandhar: The Revenge
- Spouse: Yami Gautam (m. 2021)
- Children: 1

Aditya Dhar (pronounced [aːd̪ɪt̪jə d̪ʱaːɾ]; born 12 March 1983) is an Indian filmmaker who works in Hindi cinema. Having previously worked as a lyricist, Dhar made his directorial debut with the 2019 war film Uri: The Surgical Strike, a commercially successful venture which earned him the National Film Award for Best Direction. Dhar rose to prominence with the Dhurandhar Duology, comprising the spy action thrillers Dhurandhar (2025) and Dhurandhar: The Revenge (2026). Both films rank among Indian cinema's top five highest earners ever at the box office.

== Early life and education ==
Dhar was born on 12 March 1983 in New Delhi into a Kashmiri Pandit family. His mother Sunita Dhar was a former dean of the Delhi University. He grew up in Delhi and did his schooling from Guru Harkrishan Public School, Vasant Vihar, New Delhi, and graduated from Hindu College, Delhi. He suffered from severe dyslexia during his school years, which led to academic difficulties. As a result, he redirected his focus to theatre, music, and storytelling.

During his early years, Dhar was involved with theatre and worked with groups like the Delhi Music Theatre (DMT). At the age of 12, he acted with Gaurav Gera in the DMT production West Side Story. This helped shape his screenwriting career. He also played college-level cricket as a spinner for Delhi University. According to an interview by Priyadarshan, Dhar was aiming for selection in the Indian team for the 2002 Under-19 Cricket World Cup, but was passed over, after which he moved to Mumbai. However, sports journalists from Wisden and the Press Trust of India found no record of Dhar in national under-19 cricket.

== Career ==
=== Early career (2006—2018) ===
In 2006, Dhar moved to Mumbai and began his career as an assistant director. He contributed lyrics for songs composed by Raghav Sachar in the films Kabul Express, Haal-e-Dil and Daddy Cool. Dhar then worked as an assistant director to Abhishek Pathak on the 2009 short film Boond. He joined as an assistant director to Priyadarshan and served as the dialogue writer for the director's films, Aakrosh and Tezz. Dhar's first directorial was titled Raat Baaki, which was to be backed by Karan Johar's Dharma Productions, but the film was shelved due to Pakistani actor Fawad Khan's presence in the cast after the 2016 Uri attack. The attack sparked nationwide outrage and a ban on Pakistani artists working in India, and eventually the film was shelved overnight. After India's response in the form of the 2016 Indian Line of Control strike, Dhar decided to make a film about it, which later released as Uri: The Surgical Strike.

=== Directorial breakthrough and production company (2019—2024) ===
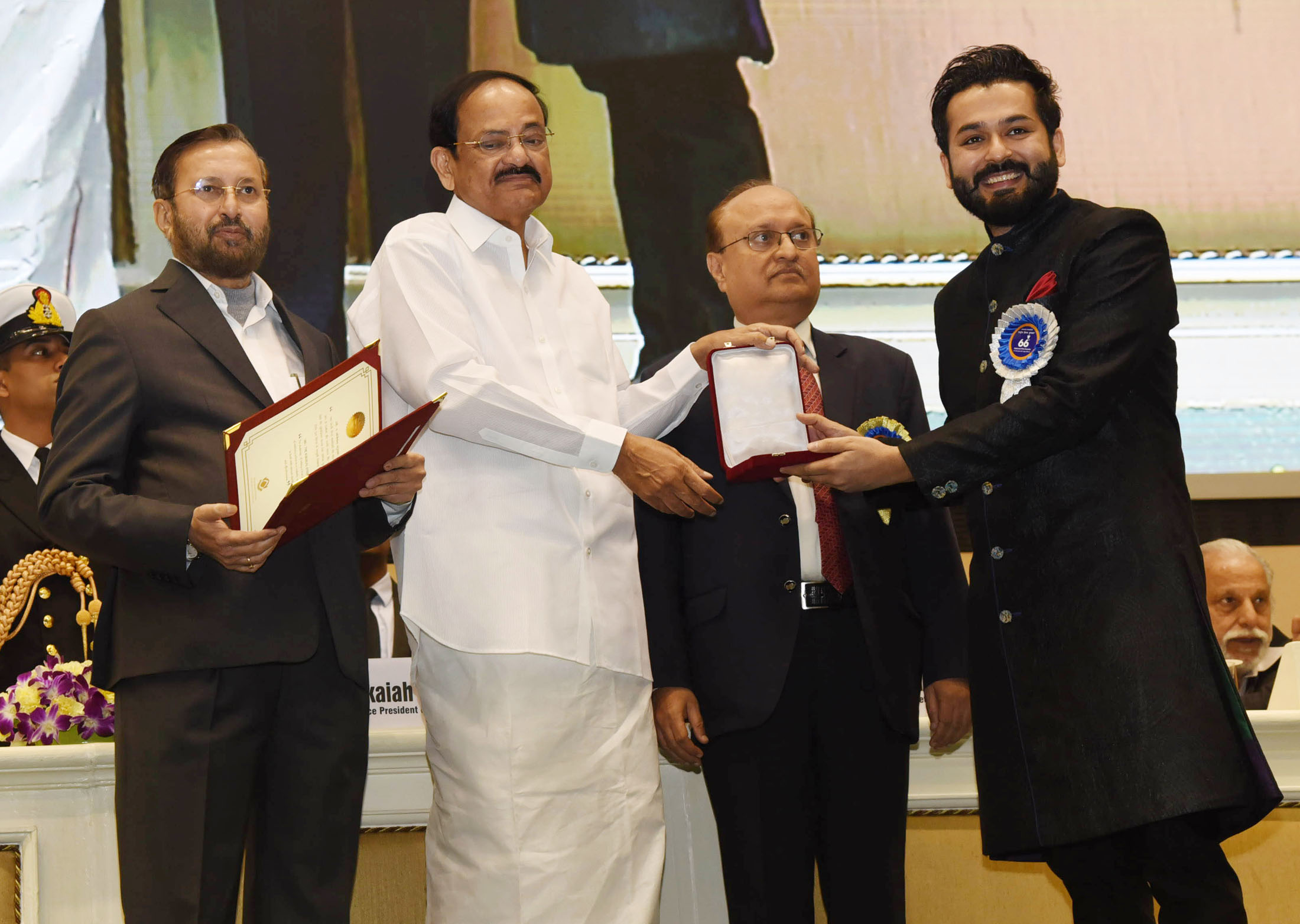
Dhar receiving the Best Director Award for Uri: The Surgical Strike at 66th National Film Awards

In 2019, Dhar made his directorial debut with Uri: The Surgical Strike, a war action film starring Vicky Kaushal, Yami Gautam and Paresh Rawal; it was produced by Ronnie Screwvala under the RSVP Movies banner and was filmed in Serbia. It was based on real-life retaliation operations following the 2016 Uri attack and received acclaim for direction, cinematography, single shot combat scenes and narrative style, though some criticised it for allegedly being aligned with the BJP government. The film became a commercial success, grossing over ₹3.5 billion (US$37 million) worldwide, becoming the tenth highest-grossing Indian film domestically. For this film, he received the National Film Award for Best Director and the Filmfare Award for Best Debut Director. The slogan "How's the Josh" used in the film went viral in Indian social media. This question is asked to military cadets to test their enthusiasm in the film. The slogan was also used by Indian Prime Minister Narendra Modi while inaugurating the National Museum of Indian Cinema of the Films Division of India.

For Dhar's next directorial, he was scheduled to collaborate with Vicky Kaushal again for a mythological superhero film titled The Immortal Ashwatthama and the first look was released in January 2021. The film was planned as a trilogy and was expected to begin filming; however, it was shelved due to the COVID-19 pandemic and budgetary constraints. Dhar subsequently produced films under his B62 Studios production banner which includes the critically acclaimed political film Article 370 (2024) and the horror thriller Baramulla (2025); in which he also served as a co-writer of the films.

=== Widespread success and recognition (2025—present) ===
On 5 December 2025, Dhar's second directorial, Dhurandhar, a political spy thriller, was released, featuring Ranveer Singh, Akshaye Khanna, R. Madhavan, Sanjay Dutt and Arjun Rampal, produced by his company B62 Studios and Jio Studios. His filmmaking was well received, critics praising the ensemble cast performance, direction, cinematography, action sequences, soundtrack, world building and production values, while criticism was directed for mixing fact and fiction. Dhurandhar emerged as a major commercial success at the box office, becoming the 4th Hindi film to cross ₹1,000 crore worldwide. It grossed over ₹1350 crore worldwide and ranks as the 4th highest grossing Indian films of all time, 2nd highest grossing Hindi film, the highest grossing Hindi films in India and the highest grossing Adult-certified Indian film. On 7 January 2026, the film surpassed Pushpa 2: The Rule and became the highest-grossing film in Hindi domestic net collections. Thus, it became the highest grosser in Hindi language alone and also the most successful Bollywood film after the COVID pandemic.

The success of Dhurandhar led "Peak detailing by Aditya Dhar" captioned memes on the internet and across social media for his authentic approach to filmmaking, such as having characters being highly realistic with real events, action sequences, firearm handling or shooting massive explosions completely in-real rather than relying only on CGI. Originally Dhurandhar was conceived as a single film, Dhar later opted for a two-part release because of the film's length, the sequel being named Dhurandhar: The Revenge; which was revealed in the post-credit scene in Dhurandhar.

Dhurandhar: The Revenge was released on 19 March 2026, only 3 and half months after the first part's release. Like its predecessor, it received praise for Dhar's execution, cast performance, technical aspects, musical score, Dhar's direction and world building, but criticism for mixing fact and fiction and alleged nationalist propaganda. Nevertheless, the film emerged as a major commercial success and broke several box office records for an Indian film. It crossed the ₹1000 crore worldwide mark within a week and became the 5th Hindi film to do so. Dhar became only the second Indian director after S. S. Rajamouli to direct two ₹1000 crore films. The film became the first Indian film which grossed over ₹1000 crore in only Hindi net collections. By the end of the fifth week of its release, the film had grossed over ₹1850 crore worldwide. It eventually emerged as the second-highest-grossing Indian film of all time, the second-highest-grossing Hindi-language film worldwide, the highest-grossing Hindi-language film domestically, the third-highest-grossing film in India and the highest grossing A-rated Indian film of all time.

After the Dhurandhar Duology, Dhar is reportedly deciding between three options for his next film: a historical drama about the Maurya Empire starring Ranveer Singh; a sports drama; or rebooting his shelved 2021 film The Immortal Ashwatthama.

== Filmmaking and reception ==
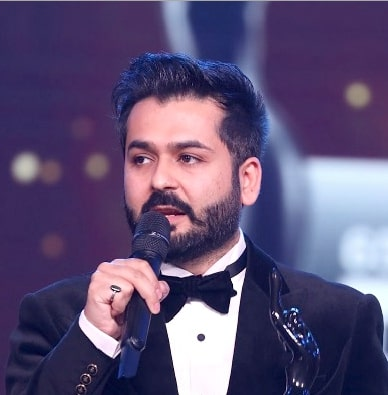
Dhar at 65th Filmfare Awards in 2020

Observers have noted Dhar's ability to combine high-concept storytelling with engaging cinematic techniques. His films blend nationalism, action and emotional drama, creating a mass appeal to audiences. He is noted for his film's scale, set design, realistic action sequences and structural narrative style in chapters. Dhar's directorial debut, Uri: The Surgical Strike (2019), received acclaim for its technical aspects, emotional quotient and realistic war sequences, and was a commercial success as well but was criticised for jingoism. The Guardian reported the film was described as "patriotic by some and propaganda by others". The Times of India said it was "a fitting tribute to the Indian Army conceptually but cinematically, it's not a film without flaws".

Dhar's next directorial, the spy action thriller Dhurandhar Duology, comprising Dhurandhar (2025) and Dhurandhar: The Revenge (2026), received mixed to positive response from critics. It garnered widespread acclaim for Dhar's direction, technical aspects, narratives style, use of music and performances of its ensemble cast, and criticism for mixing facts and fiction, while some commentators called it politically propagandic. However, several other commentators have argued the propaganda characterisation. Industry figures such as Ram Gopal Varma and Sandeep Reddy Vanga have praised Dhar's ability to craft high-voltage sequences and layered character portrayals that feel both immersive and emotionally charged, suggesting that Dhar combines a commercial sensibility with attention to detail and thematic coherence. Anurag Kashyap applauded Dhar's filmmaking and execution, and called Dhurandhar (2025) a "courageous mainstream film", comparing it to other spy thrillers such as The Hurt Locker and Zero Dark Thirty. He found some dialogues to be propagandistic and regarded them as Dhar's personal politics. Other filmmakers such as Madhur Bhandarkar and SS Rajamouli also praised Dhar's filmmaking after watching Dhurandhar: The Revenge.

== Personal life ==
His elder brother, Lokesh Dhar, has served as a leading studio executive at UTV Motion Pictures and later Fox Star Studios. In 2021, he and Lokesh co-founded the production company B62 Studios.

The Dhars at the 72nd National Film Awards

On 4 June 2021, Dhar married Indian actress Yami Gautam in a traditional Hindu ceremony in Mandi district, Himachal Pradesh. Their first child, Vedavid, was born on 10 May 2024. In 2026, they moved permanently to Himachal Pradesh.

== Filmography ==
Key
†	Denotes films that have not yet been released

=== As Director ===
Year	Title	Notes
2019	Uri: The Surgical Strike	Directorial debut
2025	Dhurandhar	
2026	Dhurandhar: The Revenge	

=== As Writer ===
Year	Title	Credit
2010	Aakrosh	Dialogues
2012	Tezz	Dialogues
2019	Uri: The Surgical Strike	Yes
2024	Article 370	Yes
2025	Dhoom Dhaam	Yes
2025	Baramulla	Yes
2025	Dhurandhar	Yes
2026	Dhurandhar: The Revenge	Yes

=== As Producer ===
Year	Title	Notes
2024	Article 370	
2025	Dhoom Dhaam	Released on Netflix
2025	Baramulla	Released on Netflix
2025	Dhurandhar	
2026	Dhurandhar: The Revenge	

== Discography ==
=== As lyricist ===
Year	Film	Title	Ref.
2006	Kabul Express	"Kabul Fiza"	
2006	Kabul Express	"Banjar"	
2006	Kabul Express	"Keh Raha Mera Dil"	
2006	Kabul Express	"Yeh Main Aaya Kahaan Hoon"	
2007	Play it Loud (Album)	All songs	
2008	Haal-e-Dil	"Rang"	
2008	Haal-e-Dil	"Khwahish"	
2009	Daddy Cool	All songs	
2011	Phhir	4 songs	

== Awards and nominations ==
Year	Award	Category	Work	Result	Ref.
2019	66th National Film Awards	Best Director	Uri: The Surgical Strike	Won	
2019	Jagran Film Festival	Best Debut Director	Uri: The Surgical Strike	Won	
2019	26th Screen Awards	Best Director	Uri: The Surgical Strike	Nominated	
2019	26th Screen Awards	Most Promising Debut Director	Uri: The Surgical Strike	Won	
2020	65th Filmfare Awards	Best Director	Uri: The Surgical Strike	Nominated	
2020	65th Filmfare Awards	Best Debut Director	Uri: The Surgical Strike	Won	
2020	Zee Cine Awards	Best Director	Uri: The Surgical Strike	Nominated	
2020	Zee Cine Awards	Most Promising Director	Uri: The Surgical Strike	Won	
2021	21st IIFA Awards	Best Director	Uri: The Surgical Strike	Won	
2021	21st IIFA Awards	Best Story	Uri: The Surgical Strike	Nominated	
2026	Zee Cine Awards	Best Film - Aditya Dhar, Lokesh Dhar, Jyoti Deshpande	Dhurandhar	Nominated	
2026	Screen Awards	Best Film	Dhurandhar	Nominated	
2026	Screen Awards	Best Director	Dhurandhar	Won	
2026	Screen Awards	Best Dialogue	Dhurandhar	Won	
2026	Screen Awards	Best Film Writing (Story & Screenplay)	Dhurandhar	Won	
