= Dasvi =

2022 Indian film by Tushar Jalota

- Official release poster
- Directed by: Tushar Jalota
- Written by: Ritesh Shah; Suresh Nair; Sandeep Leyzell
- Story by: Ram Bajpai
- Produced by: Dinesh Vijan; Shobhna Yadav; Sandeep Leyzell
- Starring: Abhishek Bachchan; Yami Gautam; Nimrat Kaur
- Cinematography: Kabir Tejpal
- Edited by: A. Sreekar Prasad
- Music by: Sachin–Jigar
- Production companies: Jio Studios; Maddock Films; Bake My Cake Films
- Distributed by: Netflix; JioCinema
- Release date: 7 April 2022
- Running time: 126 minutes
- Country: India
- Language: Hindi

Dasvi (transl. Tenth) is a 2022 Indian Hindi-language social comedy film directed by debutante Tushar Jalota and produced by Dinesh Vijan under his banner Maddock Films in collaboration with Jio Studios as well as Shobhna Yadav and Sandeep Leyzell under Bake My Cake Films. It stars Abhishek Bachchan, Yami Gautam and Nimrat Kaur. Bachchan played the role of an uneducated politician, with Gautam as an IPS officer. The film premiered on Netflix and JioCinema on 7 April 2022. A famous poet and politician Dr. Kumar Vishwas served as the script and dialogue consultant. The film received mixed reviews with praise for its storyline, humor, performances (particularly Bachchan, Kaur, and Gautam's) and social message but criticism for being inconsistent in its screenplay.

Abhishek Bachchan won Best Actor (Male) for his performance at the 2022 Filmfare OTT Awards.

== Plot ==
Ganga Ram Chaudhary, the charismatic and arrogant Chief Minister of the fictional state of Harit Pradesh, is implicated in a scam and remanded to judicial custody. He appoints his wife Bimla Devi "Bimmo" Chaudhary as CM until he can post bail. Initially meek and subservient, Bimmo quickly learnt the ropes and establishes herself as a powerful politician, she underwent an image makeover in the process. Meanwhile, Chaudhary's popularity and street-smart gained him a following in jail and he received preferential treatment. When Jyoti Deswal, a new superintendent, arrives at the jail, Chaudhary's life takes a turn for the worse. Incorruptible and no-nonsense, Jyoti revokes Chaudhary's privileges and treats him like any other prisoner. Chaudhary's attempts to bribe a judge fail, and his immediate bail request is denied.

Following a confrontation, Jyoti embarrasses Chaudhary by evoking his lack of education - he dropped out in 8th grade - and puts him to work in the prison workshop making chairs as he is unqualified for any other work. Spurred by this and by the fact that prisoners attempting to gain a 10th-grade diploma are exempt from work, Chaudhary resolves to study and clear the 10th-grade exams to gain his high-school diploma. Jyoti believes this is a scam, but her hands are tied as Indian Law grants Chaudhary the right to complete his education. Chaudhary struggled to stay engaged in his studies, frequently falling asleep, until he is inspired by a history textbook detailing India's struggle for independence; he begins to take his studies much more seriously. He declares that if he cannot clear his exams, he will not re-enter Politics.

Meanwhile, Bimmo grows ambitious and plots to make her interim post permanent, suggesting to Chaudhary that he feign mental illness to gain asylum in a lavish hospital. Jyoti foils this by exposing Chaudhary's lies, saving his political career in the process (as people proved to be mentally unfit are disqualified from contesting elections). When Chaudhary suffers a minor heart attack, Jyoti saves him by performing CPR, drawing Bimmo's ire. Chaudhary progresses in his studies with help from inmates he has befriended, but struggles in Hindi as he seems to have dyslexic issues with respect to Hindi language and cannot visualize the alphabet. Bimmo meanwhile tries to make passing the exams difficult for Chaudhary, by arranging the release of the prisoner who is helping him with Science, and setting the Examination Time Table in such a way that Hindi exam comes first. Jyoti, beginning to see the change in character that the focus on education has brought on in Chaudhary, agrees to help him. As they make progress, they develop mutual respect.

Chaudhary's bail application is processed and he is cleared for release, but Jyoti hides this from him so he can focus on his studies. Chaudhary appears for his exams but is uncertain of how he has performed. When he is released, he finds out about Jyoti hiding the sanctioning of his bail application. When Jyoti remarks how education has changed him for the better and advises him to help the public with his newly acquired education, Chaudhary brushes her off and tells her that he'll never change; Jyoti is disappointed by his intransigence. But when Chaudhary returns to the political arena, he discovers that Bimmo has usurped the CM chair and he has no support in his own party. None of his ministers want to endanger their position by taking his side in the couple-struggle. This makes Chaudhary join the coalition party in the government, and topples the government. General elections are declared, and all groups campaign vigorously. The election results and exam results are due on the same day. While votes are being counted, Chaudhary rushes back to jail to discover that he has passed the exams. As a token of gratitude, he gifts Jyoti a chair that he'd made in the workshop as her Gurudakshina (traditionally a gift given by a student to a teacher). His new party wins the election and Chaudhary reconciles with Bimmo. He refuses the Chief Minister post and chooses to become the Minister of Education instead. During his oath ceremony, he makes it a point to convey his gratitude to Jyoti and the other inmates who helped him clear the exams.

== Cast ==
- Abhishek Bachchan as Chief Minister Ganga Ram Chaudhary (Based on Om Prakash Chautala)
- Yami Gautam as IPS Jyoti Deswal, Jailer
- Nimrat Kaur as Bimla Devi "Bimmo" Chaudhary, Chief Minister Ganga Ram Chaudhary's wife
- Manu Rishi Chaddha as Satpal Tomar
- Abhimanyu Yadav as Goonga
- Arun Kushwah as Balram "Ghanti"
- Chittaranjan Tripathy as Tandon; IAS officer and Chief Minister's secretary
- Danish Husain as Rai Bareli; librarian
- Sumit Shekhar Rai as Prem Qaidi
- Rohit Tiwari as Inaamdar
- Lokesh Mittal as Sherawat
- Mubashir Bashir Beigh
- Dhanveer Singh as Atul Chaudhary, Ganga Ram's brother
- Sachin Shroff as Sandeep Sangwan, Opposition Party's Leader
- Aditi Vats as Bimla Devi's manager
- Shivankit Singh Parihar as Kavish Kumar, a news reporter
- Shakti Singh as Chandra Shekhar Azad
- Shobhna Yadav as herself, ABP News anchor

== Production ==
The principal photography begun on 22 February 2021 in Agra. This movie are shoots inside the Agra Central Jail.

== Soundtrack ==
Dasvi

Soundtrack album by Sachin–Jigar
- Released: 28 March 2022
- Genre: Feature film soundtrack
- Length: 13:42
- Language: Hindi
- Label: Zee Music Company

Sachin–Jigar chronology
Chandigarh Kare Aashiqui (2021)	Dasvi (2022)	Bhediya (2022)

Official audio
- Dasvi - Full Album on YouTube

The music of the film is composed by Sachin–Jigar with lyrics written by Amitabh Bhattacharya and Ashish Pandit.

Track listing
No.	Title	Lyrics	Singer(s)	Length
1.	"Macha Macha Re"	Amitabh Bhattacharya	Mika Singh, Divya Kumar, Mellow D, Sachin–Jigar	3:16
2.	"Ghani Trip"	Ashish Pandit	Mellow D, Kirti Sagathia, Sachin–Jigar	2:55
3.	"Thaan Liya"	Ashish Pandit	Sukhwinder Singh, Tanishkaa Sanghvi, Sachin–Jigar	4:31
4.	"Nakhralo"	Ashish Pandit	Mame Khan, Sachin–Jigar	3:00
Total length:				13:42

== Reception ==
On the review aggregator website Rotten Tomatoes, 8% of 12 critics' reviews are positive, with an average rating of 4.1/10.

Sukanya Verma of Rediff.com gave the film a rating of 3 out 5 stars and wrote, "Abhishek packs a punch and Nimrat is deliciously wicked, but Dasvi falls short of being the razor-sharp satire it deeply aspires to be." Bharathi Pradhan of Lehren rated the film 3 out of 5 stars and wrote, "Dasvi is like an average exam paper – some are expected, some catch you by surprise, you get some right and you get some wrong." Renuka Vyavahare of The Times of India rated the film 2.5/5 and wrote, "Dasvi has a noble intent but that doesn't translate into a engaging movie." Shubhra Gupta of Indian Express gave the film a rating of 2.5/5 and wrote, "Abhishek Bachchan is a perfect match for the kind of character he is playing. It's a pity that the material never quite knows whether it is an exaggerated parody or a sharp comedy with realistic overtones." Avinash Lohana of Pinkvilla rated the film 2.5/5 and wrote, "when you see the film it is evident that the makers wanted to strike the right balance between conveying a message and entertaining the audience, but it ends up being more preachy than anything else."

Anna M. M. Vetticad of Firstpost rated the film 2.5/5 and wrote, "Dasvi – part fun, largely skimming over the surface of its concerns and characters, but with just enough going for it to make it a mildly entertaining experience." Taran Adarsh of Bollywood Hungama rated the film 2.5/5 and wrote, "While Dasvi rests on an interesting story, message, and the impressive performances by the three leading actors, it turns out to be an average fare due to the flawed script." Grace Cyril of India Today gave the film a rating of 2/5 and wrote, "Abhishek Bachchan has done an impressive job as a Haryanvi politician in Dasvi. However, the film's story fails to achieve its purpose." Saibal Chatterjee of NDTV rated the film 1.5/5 and wrote, "It approaches the job with too much seriousness and takes all the fun out of the exercise in the bargain."

== See also ==
- Harit Pradesh
