= Caught Out: Crime. Corruption. Cricket =

2023 Indian documentary film on the cricket match-fixing scandal

- Promotional poster
- Directed by: Supriya Sobti Gupta
- Written by: Supriya Sobti Gupta
- Produced by: Passion Pictures
- Production company: Passion Pictures
- Distributed by: Netflix
- Release date: 17 March 2023
- Running time: 80 minutes
- Country: India
- Language: English

Caught Out: Crime. Corruption. Cricket is a 2023 Indian documentary film directed by Supriya Sobti Gupta and produced by Passion Pictures for Netflix. The film looks back at the match-fixing scandal that shook Indian cricket in the late 1990s and early 2000s, a period that changed how the game was seen by fans and players alike. It mixes interviews with journalists, administrators and former players with television footage and news clippings from the time.

== Synopsis ==
Set against India's cricket boom of the 1990s, the film follows the sequence of events that led to the exposure of match-fixing and betting in international cricket. It revisits the allegations that involved cricketers such as Mohammad Azharuddin, Ajay Jadeja, and Hansie Cronje, and the investigations that followed.

It also looks at how reporters and news editors uncovered what was happening behind the scenes. Through these accounts, the documentary captures the disbelief that swept through fans and the slow, painful process of rebuilding the game's reputation.

== Production ==
Supriya Sobti Gupta directed the film for Passion Pictures, which has produced several international documentaries. Gupta said she wanted to focus on the reporters who broke the story rather than retelling only the players’ side of events. The production used extensive archival footage, contemporary news reports and interviews recorded over several months. Gupta's approach stayed close to investigative journalism, avoiding dramatic reconstructions or narration.

== Release ==
The documentary premiered on Netflix worldwide on 17 March 2023.

== Reception ==
Caught Out received a generally positive response from reviewers, who praised its steady tone and research while noting that it could have gone further into the structural side of the scandal.

The Hindu described it as "a cinematic retelling" of a major moment in Indian cricket, though it felt "incomplete" in parts. India Today called it "a test match where patience is key," commending its pacing and honesty. Deccan Chronicle called it "pitch perfect," praising its refusal to sensationalise the story. Rediff said the film works as "a reminder of a sport's loss of innocence." Firstpost noted that it was "a sincere attempt at a marvelling expose" that relies on facts rather than drama. Jagran wrote that it revisits "a painful but necessary" part of cricket history with care.
