= Yami Gautam =

Indian actress (born 1988)

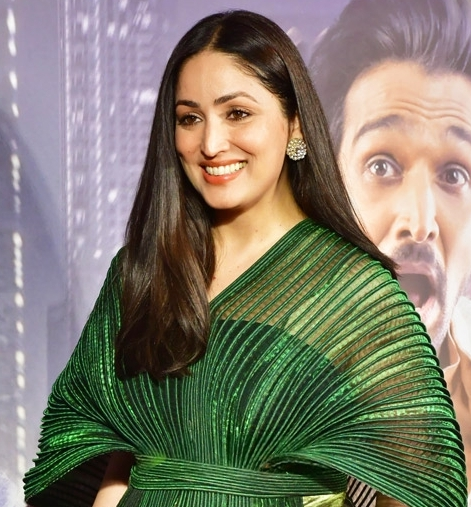
- Gautam Dhar in 2025
- Born: 28 November 1988 (age 37); Bilaspur, Himachal Pradesh, India
- Other name: Yami Gautam Dhar
- Occupation: Actress
- Years active: 2008–present
- Spouse: Aditya Dhar (m. 2021)
- Children: 1
- Father: Mukesh Gautam
- Relatives: Surilie Gautam (sister)

Yami Gautam Dhar (pronounced [jaːmiː ɡɔːtəm d̪ʱaːr]; born 28 November 1988) is an Indian actress who primarily works in Hindi films. Gautam's accolades include a National Film Award, two Screen Awards and a Zee Cine Award, alongside three Filmfare Awards nominations.

The daughter of film director Mukesh Gautam, she began her career as a model, and starred in television soap operas such as Chand Ke Paar Chalo (2008–2009) and Yeh Pyar Na Hoga Kam (2009–2010). After making her film debut in the Kannada film Ullasa Utsaha (2010), she had her first Hindi film release in the comedy-drama Vicky Donor (2012), which won her the Zee Cine Award for Best Female Debut.

Gautam earned acclaim for her supporting roles in the thrillers Badlapur (2015) and Kaabil (2017), and greater success came for starring in the war film Uri: The Surgical Strike and the satire Bala (both 2019). She had further commercial success with the satire OMG 2 (2023) and the political thriller Article 370 (2024), with the lattermost earning her the National Film Award for Best Actress. She has since earned critical acclaim for her performance as Shah Bano in Haq (2025).

Apart from acting, Gautam has served as a brand ambassador for several products. She is married to filmmaker Aditya Dhar.

== Early life ==
Gautam was born in a Hindu Brahmin family in Bilaspur, Himachal Pradesh and was brought up in Chandigarh. Her father Mukesh Gautam is a Punjabi film director. He is the chief advisor of PTC Network. Her mother is Anjali Gautam. She has a younger sister Surilie Gautam, who made her big screen debut with the Punjabi film Power Cut. She also has a younger brother, Ojas Gautam.

Describing her childhood, Gautam has said that she had a disciplined and academically inclined upbringing. She has described her childhood as relatively simple and grounded, away from the glamour associated with cinema, despite her father’s involvement in the film industry. Before entering the entertainment industry, she briefly participated in modelling assignments during her late teenage years, which gradually helped her overcome stage hesitation and build confidence.

Gautam did her regular schooling, and later entered college to pursue a graduate degree in law honours. She had aspired to join Indian Administrative Service (IAS) as a young girl, but at the age of 20, she decided to venture into an acting career. Though she was pursuing studies in Law Honors (first-year PU Student of law), she left full-time studies for acting. Recently, she has been doing her part-time graduation from Mumbai. She is fond of reading, interior decoration and listening to music.

== Career ==
=== Early television and film career (2008–2018) ===
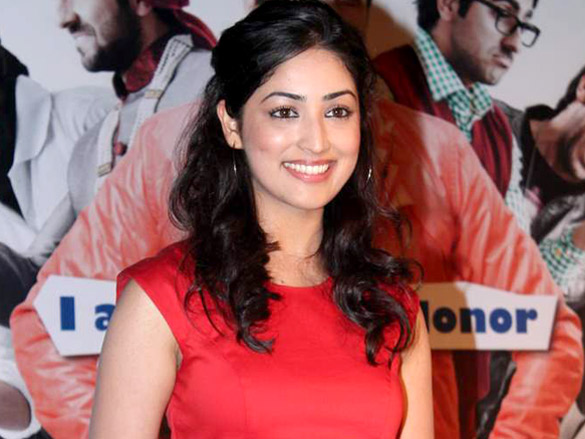
Gautam in 2012

Gautam moved to Mumbai at the age of 20 to pursue a career in acting. She began her television career with Chand Ke Paar Chalo. She subsequently played the lead in Raajkumar Aaryyan. She later gained wider recognition on television with Yeh Pyar Na Hoga Kam, which aired on Colors. She also participated in the reality shows Meethi Choori No 1 and Kitchen Champion Season 1.

Gautam made her film debut in the lead role of the 2010 Kannada-language film Ullasa Utsaha before making her Hindi film debut in a leading role in Shoojit Sircar's romantic comedy Vicky Donor (2012). The film co-starred debutant Ayushmann Khurrana, Annu Kapoor, and Dolly Ahluwalia. Gautam portrayed Ashima Roy, a Bengali woman who marries the titular character, a Punjabi man from the Arora family, and later learns about his past. The film, which marked Bollywood actor John Abraham's production debut, received positive reviews and became a major commercial success, grossing ₹645 million (US$3.9 million). Her performance earned critical acclaim and several awards and nominations, including Best Female Debut (tied with Ileana D'Cruz for Barfi!) at the Zee Cine Awards, and a nomination in the same category at the 58th Filmfare Awards. After a two-year absence from Hindi cinema, Gautam returned in 2014 with two releases. The first was Eeshwar Nivas' romantic comedy film Total Siyappa; it co-starred Ali Zafar, Anupam Kher, and Kirron Kher. She played the love interest of Zafar's character. Her second release that year was Prabhu Deva's action thriller Action Jackson, in which she portrayed the protagonist's love interest. Both films underperformed at the box office. In 2015, Gautam appeared alongside Varun Dhawan and Nawazuddin Siddiqui in Sriram Raghavan's action thriller Badlapur. The film was a critical and commercial success, earning over ₹770 million (US$11 million) worldwide, and Gautam's performance received praise.

In 2016, Gautam starred opposite Pulkit Samrat in two romantic films—Divya Khosla Kumar's Sanam Re and Vivek Agnihotri's Junooniyat. In the former, she played a high-school student who falls in love with Samrat's character; in the latter, she portrayed a Punjabi woman who falls in love with an army officer. Both films were critical and commercial failures. In 2017, Gautam starred opposite Hrithik Roshan in Sanjay Gupta's romantic revenge thriller Kaabil (2017), about a blind man seeking revenge after his blind wife is raped. The film and Gautam's performance received mixed-to-positive reviews, while the film became a commercial success, earning ₹ 1.96 billion (US$28 million) worldwide. Later that year, Gautam appeared briefly in Ram Gopal Varma's political thriller Sarkar 3, the third instalment in Varma's Sarkar franchise, alongside Amitabh Bachchan, Jackie Shroff, Manoj Bajpayee, and Amit Sadh. Sarkar 3 underperformed at the box office. In 2018, Gautam appeared in Shree Narayan Singh's social drama Batti Gul Meter Chalu (2018), playing a lawyer alongside Shahid Kapoor, Shraddha Kapoor, and Divyendu Sharma.

=== Breakthrough and commercial success (2019–2023) ===
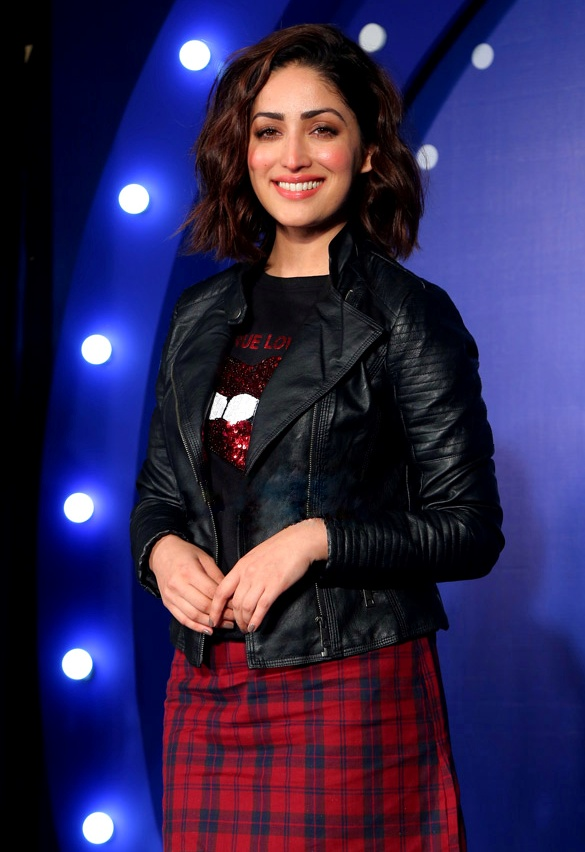
Gautam in 2019

Gautam achieved her breakthrough role in 2019 with Aditya Dhar's military action thriller Uri: The Surgical Strike opposite Vicky Kaushal. Based on the 2016 Uri attack, the film featured Gautam as intelligence officer Pallavi Sharma. It was both a critical and commercial success. The Indian Express's Shubhra Gupta felt that Gautam's character stood out among the film's female roles, many of which existed only to "to support the hero". She then reunited with Khurrana in Amar Kaushik's comedy drama Bala, a satire on physical appearance. The film received positive reviews, and Gautam drew particular acclaim for her portrayal of Pari Mishra, a ditsy influencer and part-time model. Rediff.com's Sukanya Verma found Gautam "part delirious, part deluded" and felt "there's a gentle unhinged air to her compulsive, sincere artificiality that makes her both fascinating and heartbreaking", and included her in the publication's list of the best Bollywood actresses of 2019. Both Uri: The Surgical Strike and Bala were commercial successes; the former earned over ₹3.42 billion (US$36 million) worldwide and ranked as the fourth-highest grossing Hindi film of the year.

In 2020, Gautam starred in the romantic comedy Ginny Weds Sunny opposite Vikrant Massey directed by debutant Puneet Khanna. The film was released directly on Netflix rather than theatrically due to the COVID-19 pandemic. Critics generally considered Gautam and Massey's chemistry the highlight of an otherwise monotonous film. In 2021, Gautam starred in the horror comedy Bhoot Police; it co-starred Saif Ali Khan, Arjun Kapoor, and Jacqueline Fernandez. She ended the year with a brief role, billed as a special appearance, in the Punjabi comedy Shava Ni Girdhari Lal.

In her first release of 2022, credited as Yami Gautam Dhar, she played a troubled playschool teacher who holds her students hostage in the thriller A Thursday. Released on Disney+ Hotstar, the film received a positive critical response, with Gautam Dhar earning widespread acclaim for her performance. Sneha Benganl of CNBC TV18 described it as a career-best performance, writing that she was "equal parts dangerous and vulnerable, daring and conflicted". Her second release of the year was the social comedy Dasvi, alongside Abhishek Bachchan and Nimrat Kaur. She played Jyoti Deswal, an IPS officer at the jail where Chief Minister Ganga Ram Chaudhary (Note: Not to be confused with the namasake Nepali politician) is imprisoned. The film premiered directly on Netflix and JioCinema to mixed reviews. Gautam Dhar next played Vidhi Sahani, a crime journalist investigating a missing man in Aniruddha Roy Chowdhary’s social drama Lost. The film premiered at the Chicago South Asian Film Festival and was released on ZEE5 the following year. Zinia Bandyopadhyay of India Today felt that Gautam Dhar "anchors" her character "with earnestness" and "proves her mettle again".

In 2023, Gautam Dhar starred in the heist thriller Chor Nikal Ke Bhaga, playing a flight attendant who plots to steal diamonds aboard an aircraft with her boyfriend, played by Sunny Kaushal). The film premiered on Netflix to positive reviews, with particular praise directed at Gautam Dhar's performance. Film critic Saibal Chatterjee wrote that Gautam Dhar was "the one who powers the film along especially when the ride turns somewhat bumpy", Monika Rawal Kukreja of Hindustan Times wrote, that she "truly nails her part and shines in every frame she appears in." She next starred as a lawyer in OMG 2, a satire about sex education in India, alongside Akshay Kumar and Pankaj Tripathi. The film became one of the highest-grossing Hindi films of the year. Her performance earned her a nomination for the Filmfare Award for Best Supporting Actress.

=== Critical recognition (2024-present) ===
In 2024, Gautam Dhar collaborated with her husband on the political action thriller Article 370. Set against the revocation of Jammu and Kashmir's special status under Article 370 of the Indian Constitution, the film cast Gautam Dhar as an intelligence officer involved in facilitating the abrogation. She described the project as "one of the most important in my career". Although reviews were mixed, with criticism of the film's overtly jingoistic tone, Gautam Dhar's performance was consistently praised. Monika Rawal Kukreja noted that "her no-nonsense demeanour lends a gravitas to the film and she lets her action and intense dialogue delivery do most of the talking". The film was also a commercial success, becoming one of the highest-grossing Hindi films of 2024.

In the Netflix film Dhoom Dhaam (2025), Gautam Dhar and Pratik Gandhi played newlyweds on the run from the police. WION's Shomini Sen felt that Gautam Dhar's character was a variation on roles she had played in Ginny Weds Sunny and Article 370, but praised her and Gandhi for elevating an otherwise predictable script. She next starred opposite Emraan Hashmi in Haq, a courtroom drama inspired by the landmark Mohd. Ahmed Khan v. Shah Bano Begum case. Gautam Dhar said the character's emotional depth was unlike anything she had portrayed before. The Hindu's Anuj Kumar wrote that she delivered a "career-defining performance" that combined "emotional depth and dignity [to] masterfully bring the character to life". Despite underperforming theatrically, the film later achieved high viewership on Netflix. She also made a supporting cameo in Dhurandhar: The Revenge as Shazia Bano, a nurse who is revealed to be a secret operative assisting an Indian spy.

== Personal life ==
Gautam with her husband Aditya Dhar at the 72nd National Film Awards

Gautam married Indian filmmaker Aditya Dhar on 4 June 2021 and changed her name to Yami Gautam Dhar. On 10 May 2024, the couple had their first child, a boy named Vedavid. In 2026, they moved permanently to Himachal Pradesh.

== Media image and advocacy ==
Gautam has frequently featured on Times' 50 Most Desirable Women list. She ranked 12th in 2012, 16th in 2018, 8th in 2019 and 15th in 2020. In addition to her acting career, Gautam is a prominent celebrity endorser for brands and products including Glow & Lovely, Cornetto, Chevrolet and Dollar Missy.

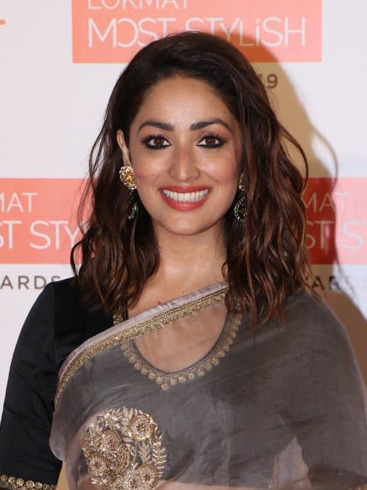
Gautam at an event in 2019

Gautam has spoken about issues relating to colourism and beauty standards in the Indian entertainment industry. Having begun her career with endorsements for skin-lightening products, she later addressed the evolving discourse around such advertisements and expressed support for broader and more inclusive representations of beauty. In interviews, she has emphasised self-acceptance and individuality, encouraging audiences to move beyond conventional appearance-based norms.

She has been associated with initiatives promoting women’s education and empowerment, including her involvement with the Glow & Lovely Foundation, which provides scholarships and career support to women across India. Gautam has also participated in campaigns focused on public health and social awareness. During the COVID-19 pandemic, she used social media platforms to promote public health guidelines and encourage adherence to safety measures. Gautam has generally maintained a non-political public profile, addressing social issues through interviews and public appearances without direct alignment to political movements or parties. Her earlier association with fairness cream endorsements has been noted in discussions on colourism in advertising, although her later statements reflect a shift in perspective consistent with broader industry trends.

== Filmography ==
Key
†	Denotes films that have not yet been released

=== Films ===
All films are in Hindi unless otherwise noted.

Year	Title	Role	Notes	Ref.
2010	Ullasa Utsaha	Mahalakshmi	Kannada film	
2011	Ek Noor	Rabiha	Punjabi film	
2011	Nuvvila	Archana	Telugu film	
2012	Vicky Donor	Ashima Roy		
2012	Hero	Gauri Menon	Malayalam film	
2013	Gouravam	Yazhini	Tamil film	
2013	Gouravam	Yamini	Telugu film	
2014	Total Siyapaa	Asha Singh		
2014	Yuddham	Madhumita	Telugu film	
2014	Action Jackson	Anusha		
2015	Badlapur	Misha Verma		
2015	Courier Boy Kalyan	Kavya	Telugu film	
2016	Sanam Re	Shruti / Anjali		
2016	Junooniyat	Suhani Kapoor		
2016	Tamilselvanum Thaniyar Anjalum	Kavya	Tamil film	
2017	Kaabil	Supriya Bhatnagar		
2017	Sarkar 3	Annu Karkare		
2018	Batti Gul Meter Chalu	Advocate Gulnaar Rizvi		
2019	Uri: The Surgical Strike	Pallavi Sharma / Jasmine Almeida		
2019	Bala	Pari Mishra		
2020	Ginny Weds Sunny	Simran 'Ginny' Juneja		
2021	Bhoot Police	Maya "Mayu" Kulbhushan		
2021	Shava Ni Girdhari Lal	Mannat	Punjabi film; Cameo	
2022	A Thursday	Naina Jaiswal		
2022	Dasvi	IPS Jyoti Deswal		
2023	Lost	Vidhi Sahani		
2023	Chor Nikal Ke Bhaga	Neha Grover		
2023	OMG 2	Advocate Kamini Maheshwari		
2024	Article 370	Zooni Haksar		
2025	Dhoom Dhaam	Koyal Chadha		
2025	Haq	Shazia Bano Begum		
2026	Dhurandhar: The Revenge	Shazia Bano	Cameo	
2026	Nayyi Navelli	Mohini		

=== Television ===
Year	Title	Role	Notes
2008–2009	Chand Ke Paar Chalo	Sana	
2008	Raajkumar Aaryyan	Rajkumari Bhairvi	
2010	CID	Ananya	Episode "Kabarwali Ladki"
2009–2010	Yeh Pyar Na Hoga Kam	Leher Mathur Vajpayee	
2010	Meethi Choori No 1	Contestant	
2010	Kitchen Champion	Contestant	Season 1

=== Music videos ===
Year	Title	Album	Language	Notes	Ref.
2015	"Yahin Hoon Main"	Single	Hindi	Composed by Rochak Kohli, features along with and sung by Ayushmann Khurrana	
2011	"Ek Ladki Shabnami Jaisi"	Single	Hindi	Composed by Tanishk Bagchi, features Pulkit Samrat	

== Awards and nominations ==
Year	Award	Category	Film	Result	Ref.
2012	Gold Awards	Rising Film Stars From TV	Vicky Donor	Won	
2012	People's Choice Awards India	Favorite Debut Actor (Male/Female)	Vicky Donor	Nominated	
2012	BIG Star Entertainment Awards	Most Entertaining Actor (Film) Debut – Female	Vicky Donor	Won	
2013	ETC Bollywood Business Awards	Most Profitable Debut (Female)	Vicky Donor	Nominated	
2013	Filmfare Awards	Best Female Debut	Vicky Donor	Nominated	
2013	Screen Awards	Most Promising Newcomer – Female	Vicky Donor	Nominated	
2013	Zee Cine Awards	Best Female Debut	Vicky Donor	Won	
2013	Stardust Awards	Best Actress	Vicky Donor	Nominated	
2013	Stardust Awards	Superstar of Tomorrow – Female	Vicky Donor	Nominated	
2013	Star Guild Awards	Best Female Debut	Vicky Donor	Nominated	
2013	Times of India Film Awards	Best Debut – Female	Vicky Donor	Nominated	
2013	International Indian Film Academy Awards	Star Debut of the Year – Female	Vicky Donor	Won	
2020	Screen Awards	Best Comedian	Bala	Won	
2020	International Indian Film Academy Awards	Best Supporting Actress	Bala	Nominated	
2020	Zee Cine Awards	Best Performance in a Comic Role	Bala	Nominated	
2022	Filmfare OTT Awards	Best Actor in a Web Original Film (Female)	A Thursday	Nominated	
2022	International Indian Film Academy Awards	Best Actress	A Thursday	Nominated	
2023	Filmfare OTT Awards	Best Actress in a Web Original Film	Lost	Nominated	
2024	Filmfare Awards	Best Supporting Actress	OMG 2	Nominated	
2025	International Indian Film Academy Awards	Best Actress	Article 370	Nominated	
2025	Zee Cine Awards	Best Actor Female – Viewers Choice	Article 370	Nominated	
2025	Zee Cine Awards	Best Actor – Female	Article 370	Nominated	
2025	Filmfare Awards	Filmfare Award for Best Actress	Article 370	Nominated	
2025	Filmfare OTT Awards	Best Actor in a web original film (female)	Dhoom Dhaam	Nominated	
2026	National Film Awards	Best Actress in a Leading Role	Article 370	Won	

== See also ==
- List of Hindi film actresses
