= Sumbal, Jammu and Kashmir =

Sumbal, Jammu and Kashmir Sumbal
- Town
- Location in Jammu and Kashmir, India Sumbal, Jammu and Kashmir (India)
- Coordinates: 34.23°N 74.63°E
- Country: India
- Union territory: Jammu and Kashmir
- District: Bandipora
- Elevation: 1,557 m (5,108 ft)

Population (2001)
  - Total: 10,737

Languages
  - Official: Kashmiri, Urdu, Hindi, Dogri, English
- Time zone: UTC+5:30 (IST)
- Vehicle registration: JK

Sumbal is a town and a notified area committee in the Bandipora district of the Indian union territory of Jammu and Kashmir. Sumbal is 19 kilometres away from Srinagar (the summer capital of Jammu and Kashmir). The surrounding parts of sumbal consist of many villages like Nowgam, shadipora, Shahtulpora, Shilwat, Shiganpora, Inderkote. This area has one of the significant Shia population in Kashmir. The place is rich in literature and agriculture. Sumbal is situated on the bank of the river Jhelum and is adjacent to the Manasbal lake. There are also many notable figures from this area including Kashmir's first Muslim lady pilot Iram Habibi and many other personalities particularly poets. The zalpora village of Sumbal joins two districts, Bandipora and Baramulla which serves as another route to connect the districts Kupwara and Baramulla to Srinagar. Sumbal city is divided into 13 wards, for which elections are held every 5 years.

== Geography ==
Sumbal is located at 34.23°N 74.63°E. It has an average elevation of 1557 metres (5108 feet).

== Demographics ==
At the 2001 India census, Sumbal had a population of 10,737. Males constitute 51% of the population and females 49%. As per census 2011, sumbal had a male literacy rate 64% and female literacy rate 36% which has largely improved since past decade. In Sumbal, 13% of the population is under 6 years of age.

== See also ==
- Manzoor Dar, a notable cricketer of Sumbal
- Uri
