= Jio Platforms =

Indian multinational technology company

Jio Platforms Limited

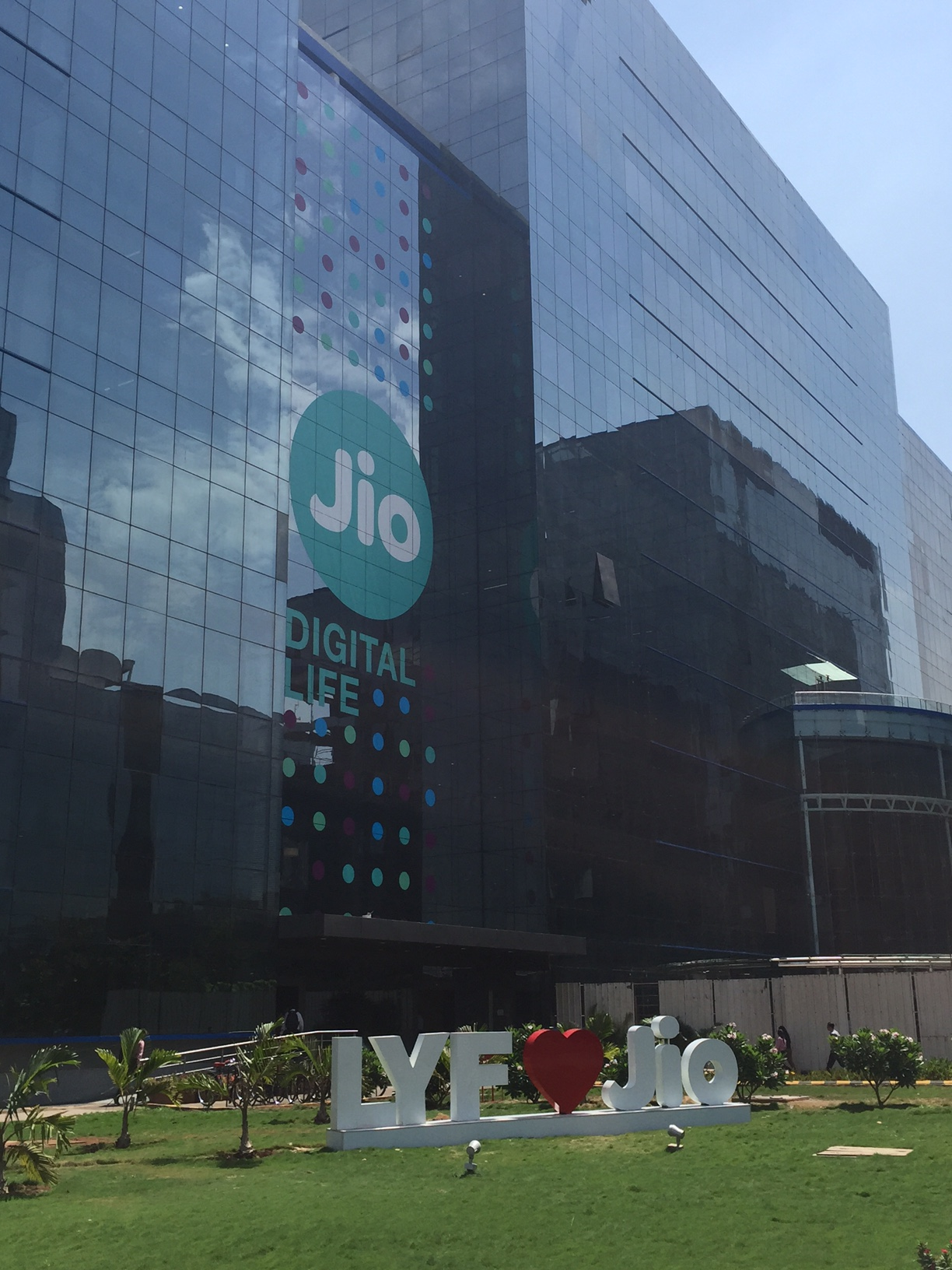
- Jio headquarters in Navi Mumbai
- Type: Public
- Traded as: NSE: JPL; BSE: 545004
- Industry: Technology
- Founded: 15 November 2019; 7 years ago
- Founder: Mukesh Ambani
- Headquarters: Navi Mumbai, Maharashtra, India
- Area served: Worldwide
- Key people: Akash Ambani (Chairman); Kiran Thomas (CEO)
- Products: Feature phones; Smartphones; Set-top boxes; 5G radio hardware; Enterprise software
- Services: Telecommunications; Broadband; Streaming television; Music streaming; Cloud computing; Cloud gaming; Digital payments; Enterprise IoT
- Revenue: ▲₹146,885.30 crore (US$16 billion) (2026)
- Operating income: ▲₹76,255.40 crore (US$8.1 billion) (2026)
- Net income: ▲₹30,049.10 crore (US$3.2 billion) (2026)
- Total assets: ▲₹452,810 crore (US$48 billion) (2026)
- Total equity: ▲₹228,490 crore (US$24 billion) (2026)
- Owners: Reliance Industries (67.03%); Meta (9.99%); Google (7.73%); Private equity firms (9.38%); Sovereign wealth funds (5.33%)
- Number of employees: 95,000+ (2026)
- Parent: Reliance Industries
- Subsidiaries: Jio; Haptik; Jio Satellite Communications; Jio Space Technology; EasyGov; Radisys; Reliance Infratel Limited
- Website: www.jio.com
- Footnotes; Financials as of 31 March 2026.

Jio Platforms Limited is an Indian multinational technology company, headquartered in Mumbai. It is a subsidiary of Reliance Industries. Established in 2019, it acts as a holding company for India's largest mobile network operator, Jio, and other digital businesses of Reliance.

In 2020, Jio Platforms raised ₹152,056 crore (US$20.52 billion) in exchange for 32.97% equity stake in the company.

== History ==
The telecom network Jio was soft-launched on 27 December 2015 with a beta for partners and employees, and became publicly available on 5 September 2016. It is the largest mobile network operator in India and the third largest mobile network operator in the world with over 42.62 crore (426.2 million) subscribers.

In 2018, Jio Studios, the media content arm of Reliance was established. In September 2019, Jio launched a fibre to the home service, offering home broadband, television, and telephone services.

In October 2019, Reliance Industries announced the creation of a wholly owned subsidiary for its digital businesses including Jio. In November 2019, the subsidiary was named Jio Platforms. The ₹1.08 trillion (US$15.34 billion) liability of Jio was transferred to Reliance and in turn Reliance received preferential shares of Jio Platforms. According to some observers, the restructuring was done to keep the digital businesses of the group within a debt-free entity.

In April 2020, Facebook acquired a 9.99% stake in Jio Platforms for ₹435.74 billion (US$5.88 billion). According to this deal, while Jio Platforms retained ₹149.76 billion (US$2.02 billion), the parent company got the remaining ₹285.98 billion (US$3.86 billion) for redeeming the optionally convertible preference shares it held in the subsidiary.

In May 2020, private equity firm Silver Lake Investors obtained a 1.15% stake with a ₹56.5 billion (US$762.49 million) investment in the company. But unlike the previous transaction, the entire investment in this case was retained by Jio Platforms. General Atlantic then announced that it would invest ₹65.988 billion (US$890.53 million) in Jio Platforms for a 1.34% stake in the company. American private equity firm KKR acquired a 2.32% stake in Jio Platforms for ₹113.67 billion (US$1.53 billion).

In June 2020, Emirati sovereign fund Mubadala confirmed that it would acquire a 1.85% stake in the company for ₹90.936 billion (US$1.23 billion). Silver Lake increased its stake to 2.08% with an additional ₹45.47 billion (US$613.63 million) investment. Abu Dhabi Investment Authority then bought a 1.16% stake in the company for ₹56.84 billion (US$767.08 million). On 13 June, TPG took stake in Jio Platforms of 0.93% worth ₹45.468 billion (US$613.61 million). L Catterton also made an investment of ₹18.945 billion (US$255.67 million) for a 0.39% stake.

In June 2020, Saudi Arabia's Public Investment Fund confirmed that it would acquire a 2.32% stake in the company for ₹113.67 billion (US$1.53 billion). In July 2020, Intel confirmed that it would acquire a 0.39% stake in the company for ₹1.89 billion (US$25.51 million). In July 2020, Qualcomm confirmed that it would acquire a 0.15% stake in the company for ₹7.30 billion (US$98.52 million). This was followed by Google purchase of 7.7% stake in the company for ₹337.37 billion (US$4.55 billion).

In June 2021, Jio Platforms unveiled their Android smartphone named JioPhone Next, with plans to launch in India by September 2021.

In February 2022, Jio Platforms formed a joint venture with satellite operator SES. The newly formed Jio Space Technology Limited will deliver broadband services in India of up to 100 Gbit/s capacity using SES's SES-12 high-throughput geostationary satellite and the O3b mPOWER medium Earth orbit satellite constellation, to extend JPL's terrestrial network, enhancing access to digital services in unconnected areas within India and the region. JPL and SES will own 51% and 49% equity stake respectively in the new company.

In December 2023, Jio Studios decided to back out of producing upcoming Akshay Kumar movies Hera Pheri 3 and Welcome to the Jungle.

In the companies 47th annual general meeting chairman Mukesh Ambani unveiled the Artificial Intelligence platform JIO Brain.

In June 2026, Jio Platforms filed draft documents to go public. The IPO could raise as much as US$4 billion and give the company a market cap of more than US$100 billion. The draft documents showed the company would use part of the IPO proceeds to reduce its debt burden.

The initial public offering of Jio Platforms, sized at ₹30,213 crore (US$3.2 billion) and described as India's largest ever, opened for subscription on 21 October 2026 in a price band of ₹1,065 to ₹1,119 per share. The issue was fully subscribed within 100 minutes of opening and closed the first day at 3.01 times subscription, led by institutional demand.

== Businesses ==
=== Consumer platforms ===
- Jio, telecommunications and broadband services
- JioMoney, digital currency and payments services
- Jio apps
  - JioTV, live TV streaming app
  - JioSaavn, online music streaming service
  - JioChat, messaging app
  - JioMeet, video-conferencing platform
  - JioGamesCloud, Jio's cloud gaming service
  - JioSwitch, file sharing app
  - JioNews, newspaper and magazine app
  - JioHome, mobile remote control for Jio set-top box
  - JioGate, apartment security app
  - JioCloud, cloud storage services
  - JioSecurity, security app
  - JioHealthHub, health companion
  - JioPOS Lite, Jio recharge commission earning app
  - JioGameslite, online gaming
  - JioGauSamriddhi, IoT enabled cattle and dairy management
  - JioNews, news aggregator

=== Enterprise platforms ===
- JioMeet for Business
- JioGST

=== Acquisitions and investments ===
Several companies acquired by Reliance Industries are now under Jio Platforms:

Name	Type	Amount	Stake	Ref
Haptik	AI-based conversational platform	$100 million	87%	
Embibe	AI-based educational platform	$180 million	72.69%	
Radisys	Telecommunication technology	$75 million	100%	
Fynd	Internet marketplace platforms, E-commerce	$15 million	87%	
EasyGov	Citizen convenience services	$10 million	83%	
SankhyaSutra Labs	Simulation services	₹216 crore	83%	
C-Square	Pharmaceutical technology platform	₹82.04 crore	82%	
KareXpert	Digital healthcare platform	₹10crore		
Videonetics	Video surveillance technology	₹115 crore	Not disclosed	
Covacsis Technologies	IOT	₹10 crore	16.67%	
NEWJ	Media	₹5crore	Not disclosed	
Two Platforms	Artificial reality	$15 million	25%	

== See also ==
- List of telecom companies in India
- List of companies of India
- About Jio
