= Laapataa Ladies (soundtrack) =

Soundtrack album by Ram Sampath
- Released: 16 February 2024
- Recorded: 2023
- Genre: Feature film soundtrack
- Length: 12:14
- Language: Hindi
- Label: T-Series

Ram Sampath chronology
Kathal (2023)	Laapataa Ladies (2024)
External audio
- Laapataa Ladies - Full Album on YouTube

Laapataa Ladies is the soundtrack album to the 2024 film of the same name directed by Kiran Rao and produced by Kiran, Aamir Khan and Jyoti Deshpande under their respective banners Aamir Khan Productions and Jio Studios, starring Sparsh Shrivastava, Nitanshi Goel, Pratibha Ranta, Chhaya Kadam and Ravi Kishan. The film features four songs composed by Ram Sampath and lyrics written by Swanand Kirkire, Divy Nidhi Sharma and Prashant Pandey, and performed by Shreya Ghoshal, Sukhwinder Singh, Arijit Singh and Sona Mohapatra.

The album was released through T-Series on 16 February 2024. The film's music received acclaim from critics and Sampath won the Filmfare Award for Best Music Director and IIFA Award for Best Music Director for his work in the film, alongside other accolades for the album.

== Background ==
Ram Sampath, who had worked with Aamir Khan on several of his productions, composed the film's music and score for Laapataa Ladies. Kiran denoted on the importance of music and sound design and she further noted "Ram [Sampath] has such a deep understanding of storytelling through music, the diverse world of sounds and how to bring things to life through music." As her previous film Dhobi Ghat (2010) did not feature songs, Kiran noted that the four songs composed for the film were a completely new exercise.

While the film is set during 2001, Sampath aimed to create timeless music while also keeping the film's setting in mind. Except for "Dheeme Dheeme", all of the songs were around the duration of less than three minutes owing to the short attention span of listeners and the usage of songs being more restricted as it would affect the screenplay. Sampath considered crafting the songs to be difficult without having the lyricists on board and had an affinity towards lyrics that stays true to the film's theme and its characters. Each song reflects every other individual in the film.

The song "Dheeme Dheeme" was composed even before the film's production started. Considering the song "Dheeme Dheeme" as closest to the heart, and though not featuring in the film prominently along with "Beda Paar", the latter was the beginning of the story that changes everything, and "Dheeme Dheeme" being the closure, where everything resolves. The song "Beda Paar" came out when Sampath was working on the background score. "Dheeme Dheeme" was written by Swanand Kirkire who worked with Sampath on the theme song for Satyamev Jayate talk show. Despite Kirkire's busy schedule, he wrote the song which was constructed around Shtam's character. However, due to time constraints Sampath could not commit to one particular lyricist and instead collaborated with other lyricists for the songs. Screenwriter Divy Nidhi Sharma wrote the song "Doubtwa" which reflected Manohar's mind and opens like a 1970s song, as it is centered on suspicion.

Prashant Pandey reached out to Sampath via social media, with the latter liking his work, and noted that he brought the sophisticated simplicity in the writing of the songs. He liked the antara in the song "Beda Paar" and the emotions he brought through "Sajni". Drawing inspiration of Kalyanji–Anandji and Madan Mohan's use of music pieces in the songs, that brought a certain flavor, he also emulated that particular style while composing the songs. Sajni marked the maiden collaboration between Sampath and Arijit Singh. Kiran and Aamir had a specific idea of his sounding, without an extroverted projection and a certain kind of melancholy in his voice which Arijit emulated it. For the instrumentation, Sampath used harmonium in place of strings, as per Kiran's suggestion and used distorted mandolin in place of electric guitars to make it warm and organic. Kiran also noted on Sampath's use of an unusual Korean string instrument for a particular scene which suited the film well.

== Track listing ==
Track listing
No.	Title	Lyrics	Singer(s)	Length
1.	"Doubtwa"	Divy Nidhi Sharma	Sukhwinder Singh	2:30
2.	"Sajni"	Prashant Pandey	Arijit Singh	2:50
3.	"Dheeme Dheeme 1.0"	Swanand Kirkire	Shreya Ghoshal	4:28
4.	"Beda Paar"	Prashant Pandey	Sona Mohapatra	2:26
Total length:				12:14

== Reception ==
Vipin Nair of Music Aloud rated 3.5 out of 5 and wrote "After a long break post Raees, it is good to see Ram Sampath compose for two movies in as many years. In Laapataa Ladies he also gets back with Aamir Khan Productions, a production house with which the man has had most success. And here too he comes up with a well-realised soundtrack, although I do wish it had more songs and that three of the four songs weren’t half-size. Nevertheless, hope to see the composer as active, if not more active, in the coming months." Siddhant Adlakha of Variety wrote "the score for Laapataa Ladies, composed by Ram Sampath, has a bouncy and propulsive quality, keeping the movie’s comedic musings on track." Anuj Kumar of The Hindu wrote "the charming compositions of Ram Sampath and the incisive verse of Divyanidhi Sharma enrich the emotional tapestry of the narrative."

Namrata Joshi of The New Indian Express wrote "Ram Sampath’s music is as much an essential part of it. The fresh and stylish experiment with folk songs, rhythms and instruments adds to the vibrancy of the narrative while also echoing and emphasizing the authenticity and rootedness of the world." Uday Bhatia of Mint called the music "charming". A reviewer from Outlook wrote "Music by Ram Sampath is another strength of the film and a couple of songs in the background add the rural and rusty touch to the proceedings." Reviewing the song "Sajni", Tatsam Mukherjee of The Wire wrote "Sampath’s song emerges as an unlikely hero as it accentuates the longing in the film, without ever intruding and stating its presence. The song showcases its composer at his strongest; Sampath knows how to keep things simple."

== Accolades ==
Year	Award	Category	Nominee/Work	Result	Ref.
2025	25th IIFA Awards	Best Music Director	Ram Sampath	Won	
2025	25th IIFA Awards	Best Lyricist	Prashant Pandey for "Sajni"	Won	
2025	25th IIFA Awards	Best Male Playback Singer	Arijit Singh for "Sajni"	Nominated	
2025	25th IIFA Awards	Best Female Playback Singer	Shreya Ghoshal for "Dheeme Dheeme"	Nominated	
2025	70th Filmfare Awards	Best Music Director	Ram Sampath	Won	
2025	70th Filmfare Awards	Best Lyricist	Prashant Pandey for "Sajni"	Won	
2025	70th Filmfare Awards	Best Lyricist	Swanand Kirkire for "Dheeme Dheeme"	Nominated	
2025	70th Filmfare Awards	Best Male Playback Singer	Arijit Singh for "Sajni"	Won	
2025	70th Filmfare Awards	Best Female Playback Singer	Shreya Ghoshal for "Dheeme Dheeme"	Nominated	
2025	70th Filmfare Awards	Best Background Score	Ram Sampath	Nominated	
