= Shailesh R. Singh =

Indian film producer

Shailesh R Singh
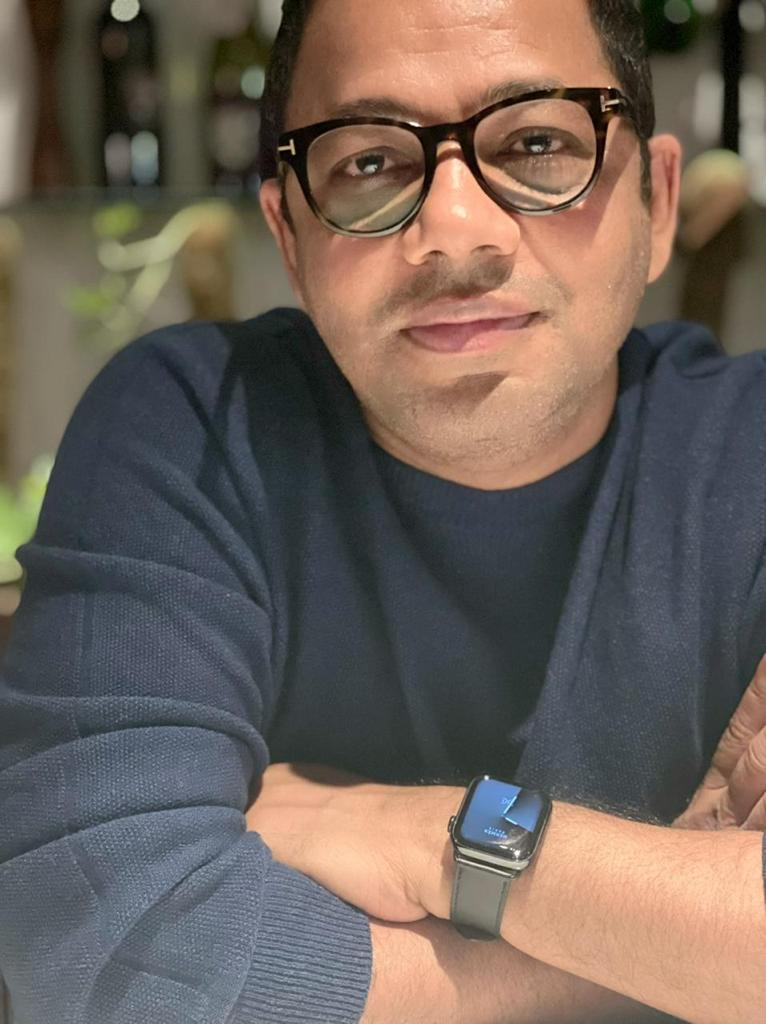
- Shailesh Singh in 2017.
- Born: Shailesh R Singh
- Notable work: Tanu Weds Manu (2011); Shahid (2013)

Shailesh R Singh is an Indian film producer known for his works in Hindi cinema. He has produced both commercially and critically acclaimed films.

== Career ==
Shailesh R Singh has produced films like Tanu Weds Manu. He has also produced films like Shahid, Madaari, Aligarh & Omerta. Shailesh Singh has supported & worked with filmmakers like Manish Jha, Bejoy Nambiar, Hansal Mehta and Aanand L Rai in their early professional days.

In 2019, the films produced under Singh's production house, Karma Media And Entertainment & Paramhans Creations, are: Jabariya Jodi, starring Sidharth Malhotra and Parineeti Chopra, and Judgementall Hai Kya, a black comedy starring Rajkummar Rao and Kangana Ranaut. Both are produced in association with Balaji Motion Pictures.

A romantic film Hurdang directed by Nikhil Nagesh Bhatt produced by him under his banner of Karma Media and Entertainment. The film features Sunny Kaushal, Nushrat Bharucha and Vijay Varma in the lead roles. The filming commenced on 6 July 2019.

== Filmography ==
Year	Film	Cast
2006	Bas Ek Pal	Juhi Chawla, Urmila Matondkar, Jimmy Sheirgill, Sanjay Suri, Rehaan, Yashpal Sharma
2008	Dil Kabaddi	Irrfan Khan, Rahul Bose, Rahul Khanna, Konkana Sen Sharma, Soha Ali Khan, Payal Rohatgi
2011	Tanu Weds Manu	R. Madhavan, Kangana Ranaut, Jimmy Sheirgill, Deepak Dobriyal, Swara Bhaskar
2011	Not a Love Story	Mahie Gill, Deepak Dobriyal, Nitish Sharma, Ajay Gehi
2013	Sixteen	Izabelle Leite, Mehak Makwana, Wamiqa Gabbi, Highphill Mathew, Keith Sequeria, Rohan Mehra, Sumit Bhardwaj, Varun Jhamb
2013	Issaq	Amyra Dastur, Prateik Babbar, Ravi Kishan, Rajeshwari Sachdev, Neena Gupta, Evelyn Sharma, Malini Awasthi
2013	Shahid	Rajkummar Rao, Tigmanshu Dhulia, Kay Kay Menon, Prabhleen Sandhu, Prabal Punjabi
2016	Aligarh	Manoj Bajpayee, Rajkummar Rao, Ashish Vidyarthi
2016	Madaari	Irrfan Khan, Vishesh Bansal, Jimmy Sheirgill, Tushar Dalvi, Nitesh Pandey, Sadhil Kapoor
2017	Simran	Kangana Ranaut, Sohum Shah, Hiten Kumar, Kishori Shahne
2018	Omerta	Rajkummar Rao
2019	Judgemental Hai Kya	Rajkummar Rao, Kangana Ranaut
2019	Jabariya Jodi	Sidharth Malhotra, Parineeti Chopra
2021	Thalaivi	Kangana Ranaut
2022	Hurdang	Sunny Kaushal, Nushrat Bharucha, Vijay Varma
2023	The Lady Killer	Arjun Kapoor, Bhumi Pednekar
2023	Dedh Bhiga Zameen	Pratik Gandhi, Khushali Kumar

== Awards ==
Shahid

- National Film Award for Best Actor 2014 Rajkummar Rao
- National Film Award for Best Direction 2014 Hansal Mehta
- Filmfare Critics Award for Best Actor 2014 Rajkummar Rao
- Screen Award for Best Screenplay 2014 Hansal Mehta, Apurva Asrani, Sameer Gautam Singh
- Screen Award for Best Dialogue 2014 Sameer Gautam Singh
- Guild Award for K.A. Abbas Honour for Social Consciousness Through Cinema 2014

Tanu Weds Manu

- Filmfare RD Burman Award for New Music Talent 2012 Krsna
- Zee Cine Award for Best Actress in a Supporting Role 2012 Swara Bhaskar
- Guild Award for Best Actor in a Comic Role 2012 Deepak Dobriyal
- Guild Award for Best Cinematography 2012 Chirantan Das

Tanu Weds Manu Returns

- National Film Award for Best Actress 2016 Kangana Ranaut
- Filmfare Award for Best Dialogue 2016 Himanshu Sharma
- Guild Award for Best Actor in a Comic Role 2016 Deepak Dobriyal
- National Film Award for Best Screenplay 2016 Himanshu Sharma
- Filmfare Critics Award for Best Actress 2016 Kangana Ranaut
- IIFA Award for Best Performance in a Comic Role 2016 Deepak Dobriyal
- BIG Star Most Entertaining Comedy Film 2015 Anand L. Rai
- Screen Award for Best Comedian 2016 Deepak Dobriyal
- BIG Star Most Entertaining Actor in a Comedy Film - Male 2015 Deepak Dobriyal
