= Sajni (song) =

Song by Arijit Singh

Song by Arijit Singh

from the album Laapataa Ladies
- Language: Hindi
- Published: 12 February 2024
- Genre: Feature Film Soundtrack
- Length: 2:50
- Label: T-Series
- Composer: Ram Sampath
- Lyricist: Prashant Pandey

Laapataa Ladies track listing
- 1. "Doubtwa"; 2. "Sajni"; 3. "Dheeme Dheeme"; 4. "Beda Paar"
External videos
- "Sajni" on YouTube

"Sajni" is a song from Laapataa Ladies composed by Ram Sampath and sung by Arijit Singh. It was released by T-Series. The song entered the Billboard India Songs chart at the 24th position on 18 May 2024. Sajni Re was performed by Arijit Singh in Chandigarh.

== Background and composition ==
“Sajni” was composed by Ram Sampath, with lyrics written by Prashant Pandey. Pandey had initially approached Sampath through social media, and the two subsequently worked remotely on the film's music. Sampath said that the songwriting for Laapataa Ladies sought a sense of “sophisticated simplicity”, and praised Pandey's lyrics for conveying the emotion of virah, or separation and longing, in “Sajni”.

The song marked Sampath's first collaboration with Arijit Singh. According to Sampath, Singh initially felt that Sampath's demo recording suited the song and was hesitant to replace it with his own vocals. Singh eventually recorded the song at his studio and sent Sampath ten takes to choose from.

Kiran Rao and Aamir Khan wanted Singh's performance to differ from his usual vocal approach, favouring a restrained and melancholic delivery with less outward projection. Sampath credited Singh's ability to convey emotion through his voice with achieving the desired effect. He also noted that the composition includes a coda. Sampath notes his inspiration of the music from industry veterans such as Kalyanji–Anandji and Madan Mohan.

== Release ==
A teaser for “Sajni” was unveiled on 11 February 2024, with the full song announced for release the following day. The song was released on 12 February as the second song from the Laapataa Ladies soundtrack, following “Doubtwa”.

== Reception ==
"Sajni" received positive reviews from music and film critics. Tatsam Mukherjee of The Wire praised the song's use within the film, noting that it accentuates the sense of longing without becoming intrusive, and highlighted the simplicity of Sampath's composition.

Anish Mohanty of Planet Bollywood described "Sajni" as a soothing romantic melody with a calming quality, praising its string-based arrangement and country-influenced sound. He also noted that Singh's vocals sounded different from his usual style and felt that the song's short duration left the listener wanting more.

Vipin Nair of Music Aloud described the song as wistful and highlighted its instrumentation, particularly Vieux Cissokho's kora and Bennett Sullivan's mandolin, which he felt complemented each other and Singh's vocal performance.

== Awards and nominations ==
Year	Award	Category	Nominee	Result	Notes	Ref.
2024	RMIM Puraskaar	Best Sung Solo Song	Arijit Singh	Won		
2025	25th IIFA Awards	Best Lyricist	Prashant Pandey	Won		
2025	25th IIFA Awards	Best Male Playback Singer	Arijit Singh	Nominated		
2025	70th Filmfare Awards	Best Lyricist	Prashant Pandey	Won		
2025	70th Filmfare Awards	Best Male Playback Singer	Arijit Singh	Won		
2025	Times of India Film Awards	Best Male Playback Singer	Arijit Singh	Won		
2025	Zee Cine Awards	Best Playback Singer – Male	Arijit Singh	Won		
