= IIFA Award for Best Lyricist =

IIFA Award for Best Music Director
- Awarded for: Best Performance by a Lyricist
- Country: India
- Presented by: International Indian Film Academy
- First award: Anand Bakshi for "Hum Dil De Chuke Sanam", Hum Dil De Chuke Sanam (2000)
- Currently held by: Prashant Pandey for "Sajni", Laapataa Ladies (2025)
- Website: http://www.iifa.com

The IIFA Award for Best Lyricist is chosen by the viewers and the winner is announced at the actual ceremony. The award is given in the current year but the winner is awarded for the previous year.

== Superlatives ==
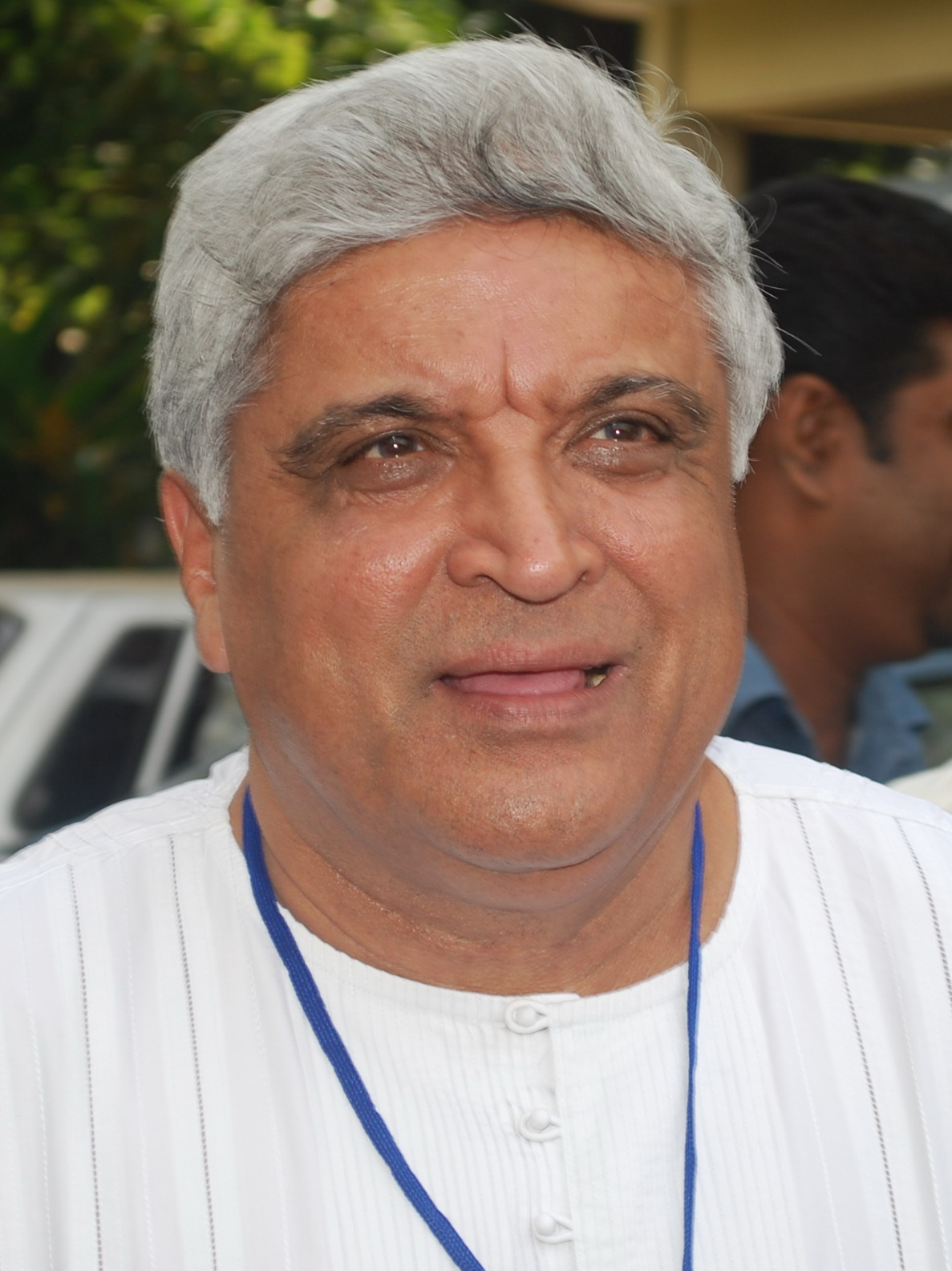
Javed Akhtar has the record for maximum wins.

Javed Akhtar has the most wins with 6 awards followed by Amitabh Bhattacharya(4) and Manoj Muntashir(3). Javed Akhtar also holds the record for most consecutive wins from 2001–02, 2004–05 and 2008–09 contributing to six awards.

Superlative	Lyricist	Record
Most awards in 2000s	Javed Akhtar	6 (out of 10)
Most awards in 2010s	Amitabh Bhattacharya	3 (out of 10)

== List of Winners ==
The winners are listed below:

Year	Lyricist	Film
2025	Prashant Pandey	Laapataa Ladies – "Sajni"
2024	Siddharth–Garima	Animal – "Satranga"
2023	Amitabh Bhattacharya	Brahmastra: Part One – Shiva – "Kesariya"
2022	Kausar Munir	83 – "Lehra Do"
2021	AWARDS NOT HELD DUE TO COVID-19 PANDEMIC
2020	Manoj Muntashir	Kesari – "Teri Mitti"
2019	Amitabh Bhattacharya	Dhadak – "Dhadak"
2018	Manoj Muntashir	Baadshaho – "Mere Rashke Qamar"
2017	Amitabh Bhattacharya	Ae Dil Hai Mushkil – "Channa Mereya"
2016	Varun Grover	Dum Laga Ke Haisha – "Moh Moh Ke Dhaage"
2015	Manoj Muntashir	Ek Villain – "Galliyan"
2014	Mithoon	Aashiqui 2 – "Tum Hi Ho"
2013	Amitabh Bhattacharya	Agneepath – "Abhi Mujh Mein Kahin"
2012	Irshad Kamil	Rockstar – "Nadaan Parindey"
2011	Niranjan Iyengar	My Name Is Khan – "Sajda"
2010	Swanand Kirkire	3 Idiots – "Behti Hawa Sa Tha Woh"
2009	Javed Akhtar	Jodhaa Akbar – "Jashn-E-Bahara"
2008	Javed Akhtar	Om Shanti Om – "Main Agar Kahoon"
2007	Prasoon Joshi	Rang De Basanti – "Rubaroo"
2006	Gulzar	Bunty Aur Babli – "Kajra Re"
2005	Javed Akhtar	Swades – "Pal Pal Hai Bhari"
2005	Sayeed Quadri	Murder – "Bheege Honth"
2004	Javed Akhtar	Kal Ho Naa Ho – "Kal Ho Naa Ho"
2003	Nusrat Badr	Devdas – "Dola Re Dola"
2002	Javed Akhtar	Lagaan – "Radha Kaise Na Jale"
2001	Javed Akhtar	Refugee – "Panchi Nadiya Pawan Ke"
2000	Anand Bakshi	Hum Dil De Chuke Sanam – "Hum Dil De Chuke Sanam"

== See also ==
- IIFA Awards
