= Aadha Ishq =

2022 Indian romantic drama web series

- Genre: Drama; Romance; Thriller
- Written by: Jaya Misra
- Screenplay by: Jaya Misra
- Story by: Jaya Misra
- Directed by: Nandita Mehra
- Starring: Gaurav Arora; Aamna Sharif; Pratibha Ranta; Kunal Roy Kapoor
- Voices of: Gulzar
- Opening theme: Aadha Aadha Ishq Humara
- Country of origin: India
- Original language: Hindi
- No. of seasons: 1
- No. of episodes: 9

Production
- Producers: Bhairavi Raichura; Nandita Mehra
- Production location: Kashmir
- Camera setup: Multi-camera
- Running time: 28 minutes approx.
- Production company: 24 Frames Media

Original release
- Release: 12 May 2022

Aadha Ishq is an Indian romantic drama web series produced by Bhairavi Raichura under the banner of 24 Frames Media. It features Aamna Sharif, Gaurav Arora and Pratibha Ranta. The series released on 12 May 2022 on streaming platform Voot Select, with nine episodes of season 1.

== Cast ==
=== Main ===
- Gaurav Arora as Saahir Singh – Roma and Rene's love interest
- Aamna Sharif as Roma Bhardwaj – Milind's ex-wife; Aman and Sahir's ex-girlfriend; Rene's mother
- Pratibha Ranta as Rene Bhardwaj – Milind and Roma's daughter; Jass's ex-girlfriend

=== Recurring ===
- Kunaal Roy Kapur as Milind – Roma's ex-husband; Samaira's husband; Rene's father
- Gautam Ahuja as Andy – Karen's son; Rene's best friend and supporter
- Darsheel Safary as Jass – Rene's ex-boyfriend
- Pooja Bhamrrah as Samaira 'Sam' – Milind's wife; Rene's stepmother
- Suchitra Pillai as Karanjit 'Karen' Kaur – Roma's best friend and supporter
- Vishal Karwal as Aman – Roma's ex-boyfriend
- Geeta Tyagi as Saahir's mother
