= Convent of Jesus and Mary, Shimla =

Convent of Jesus and Mary
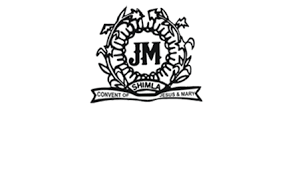

Location
- Chelsea, Shimla; Himachal Pradesh 171002; India; 31°05′35″N 77°11′18″E

Information
- Type: Convent school
- Motto: Nothing Without Love
- Religious affiliation: Roman Catholic
- Established: 1864
- Founder: Religious of Jesus and Mary
- School board: CBSE
- Principal: Sr. Stella Mary
- Staff: 52
- Enrollment: 1,719
- Classrooms: Classes 1-12
- Houses: Honesty; Perseverance; Generosity; Responsibility
- Affiliations: Provisional
- Website: cjmshimla.in

The Convent of Jesus and Mary, Chelsea is a English medium school in Shimla, founded by a French nun, Marie Claudine Thevenet of the Religious of Jesus and Mary and run by the nuns situated in the hills of the Himalayas. It started as an orphanage for the children of the British soldiers and became one of the elite educational institutions in post colonial India. It is an all-girls elementary and secondary day-school, now affiliated with the Central Board of Secondary Education. Established in Shimla in 1864, its boarding school operated for over one hundred and thirty five years, until it was decided in the year 2000 to close the boarding section and transition into a day school. As a day school, it expanded with new buildings to educate children from the stages of nursery, kindergarten, to higher classes of grades XI and XII. The Convent of Jesus and Mary School is favorably referred to as 'Chelsea', after the estate the school is built on. Its students wear a red uniform and are called 'Chelseaites'.

== Founder ==
Marie Claudine Thevenet founded the Congregation of Jesus and Mary. She was born in Lyon, France, on 30 March 1774, the second of seven children. She founded the religious order in 1818 and became known as Mary of St. Ignatius. She died on 3 February 1837, at the age of 63. After her death, six Irish nuns of the order set out for colonial India, in 1842 and one of the convents established there was Chelsea in 1864. Pope John Paul II, canonized her as a saint on 21 March 1993.

== Early history (1864–1940) ==
Chelsea is 2206 meters above sea level in the inner compound of St. Bede's College through a shared entrance. On recommendation from the Governor General of India at the time, Charles Canning, the CJM nuns moved from their work from Agra to the hills of Shimla in 1864. Mother St. Lewis Gonzaga was the first supervisor, the orphans of the British soldiers were cared for and received education from the nuns until 1940, when it was no longer an orphanage. In 1873, a chapel was built adjoining the school.

In 1946 a fire burned two-thirds of the school building; the church, the rectory, and the Victorian-style main building survived. The main building has the principal office, the administrative office, and the library. Its upper floor was used as elementary students' dormitories and an infirmary, another building on the south side was the senior boarders dormitories. In 1947 India became independent, and the school began accepting students from well-off families, mostly from the North India and some from overseas of Indian expatriates.

== Chelsea chapel 1873 ==
The British built the Chelsea chapel. A statue of the sacred heart of Jesus stands outside the front compound and a grotto of Mary behind the church, jointly shared by St. Bede's. The priests of the diocese pray and attend school ceremonies.

== Boarding school (1940–2000) ==
=== Boarders ===
As a boarding school, there were no more than 300 students in Chelsea. As a day school the enrollment was 1900 students in 2016. The boarder students predominantly came from the northern states of India. A few came from UK, North America, Africa, and Thailand, from Indian families. Some of these students were from families of the elites of Indian society. The school year lasted from March to December.

=== Dormitories ===
In the 21st century the building that housed the senior dormitories was replaced with a new multi-purpose building named Claudine Thevenet Hall.

=== Infirmary ===
Like other CJM boarding schools, Chelsea had an infirmary.

=== Curriculum ===
The school was affiliated to CISCE board and then to the CBSE board in the 21st century.

== Alumni ==
- Rani Sudha Kumari, former princess of Keonthal state (titular queen of Jubbal)
- Urvashi Kumari, The Princely and Noble Families of the former Indian Empire
- Baisa Bhumika Kumari Singh, the family of Bidwal from Maharaja Udai Singhji of Jodhpur
- Begum Aizaz Rasul, belonging to the princely state of Malerkotla
- Preneet Kaur, a politician in the Ministry of External Affairs in Punjab state (2009–2014)
- Priya Rajvansh, Bollywood actress
- Preity Zinta, Bollywood actress
- Pratibha Ranta, Bollywood actress
