= The Lady Killer (2023 film) =

2023 Indian film by Ajay Bahl

- Theatrical release poster
- Directed by: Ajay Bahl
- Written by: Ajay Bahl; Pawan Sony; Mayank Tewari
- Produced by: Bhushan Kumar; Krishan Kumar; Shaailesh R Singh; Sahil Mirchandani
- Starring: Arjun Kapoor; Bhumi Pednekar
- Cinematography: Anuj Rakesh Dhawan
- Edited by: Pranav Mistry
- Music by: Ketan Sodha
- Production companies: T-Series Films; Karma Media & Entertainment; Jussawala Productions; Polaroid Media; Movies N More
- Distributed by: AA Films
- Release date: 3 November 2023
- Running time: 125 minutes
- Country: India
- Language: Hindi
- Budget: ₹80 crore
- Box office: ₹1 lakh

The Lady Killer is a 2023 Indian Hindi-language crime thriller film directed by Ajay Bahl. The film stars Arjun Kapoor and Bhumi Pednekar. It was released in theatres on 3 November 2023, and was panned by critics, grossing only ₹38,000 on its opening day, making it one of the biggest box-office disasters in Indian cinema. Following the film's poor theatrical run, its streaming rights were not acquired by any OTT platforms, leading to the makers releasing the film on T-Series' YouTube channel.

== Synopsis ==
Rajender Joshi runs a pharmacy in Nainital. He has aspirations of opening his own diagnostic centre in the city. He is also in an affair with a married woman, Gajra. He is dismayed when his loans keep getting disapproved by the bank as he is a defaulter. His cop friend Rawat advises him to visit Vikram Burman, also known as Maharaj, a former prince who is currently bedridden and is supplied with oxygen tanks by Rajender.

There he meets Jansey who is Burman's daughter and starts a relationship with her. Upon finding out that Vikram sexually assaults Jansey, both decide to murder Vikram.

== Cast ==
- Arjun Kapoor as Rajendar Joshi
- Bhumi Pednekar as Jansey Burman
- Priyanka Bose as Gajra
- S. M. Zaheer as Vikram Burman, Jansey's father
- Ekavali Khanna as Madhuri
- Denzil Smith as Dr. Khurana
- Deepak Tokas as Rawat

== Production ==
Principal photography commenced in April 2022. Some reports suggested that the film went over-budget and was put on hold for reshoots, however producer Shaailesh R Singh debunked this, claiming that it was on track. Filming was concluded in July 2023.

== Release ==
The film was released on 3 November 2023 with only 12 shows nationwide. The film is said to have been released incomplete due to: a cost-overrun, rains in Uttarakhand and a lack of reshoots. The production team resorted to several editing cuts and voiceovers. It was initially meant for a release on Netflix, however its release was cancelled, leading to the film being released on T-Series' YouTube channel, free to watch.

== Reception ==
=== Box office ===
The film grossed only ₹38,000 on its opening day, having sold just 293 tickets nationwide, making it one of the biggest box-office bombs in the history of Indian cinema.

Bahl blamed the incomplete script for the film's failure.

=== Critical response ===
The Lady Killer was panned by critics. It was criticized for its writing, performances, editing and pacing, although there was some praise for Pednekar's performance and its score. However, audiences showed appreciation towards the film after its release on YouTube.

Bollywood Hungama gave the film 2/5 stars, criticising the screenplay of the second half with gaps and unexplained sequences in the narrative. However, the performances of Bhumi Pednekar, Priyanka Bose and Arjun Kapoor were praised, along with the background score by Ketan Sodha and cinematography by Anuj Dhavan.
