= Accused (2026 film) =

2026 Hindi-language movie

- Official release poster
- Directed by: Anubhuti Kashyap
- Written by: Sima Agarwal; Yash Keswani
- Produced by: Karan Johar; Apoorva Mehta; Somen Mishra; Adar Poonawalla
- Starring: Konkona Sen Sharma; Pratibha Ranta
- Cinematography: Linesh Desai
- Edited by: Prerna Saigal
- Music by: Neel Adhikari
- Production company: Dharmatic Entertainment
- Distributed by: Netflix
- Release date: 27 February 2026
- Running time: 106 minutes
- Country: India
- Language: Hindi

Accused is a 2026 Indian Hindi-language psychological thriller film directed by Anubhuti Kashyap and produced by Karan Johar, Apoorva Mehta, Somen Mishra, and Adar Poonawalla under Dharmatic Entertainment. The film stars Konkona Sen Sharma and Pratibha Ranta in the lead roles. It was released on 27 February 2026 on Netflix.

== Plot ==
Dr. Geetika Sen, a renowned gynecological surgeon and head of the department at Chapelstone General Hospital in London, is respected for her professional achievements but criticized for her strict and abrasive demeanor. She and her wife Dr. Meera Mishra, host a farewell party before relocating to Chester for Geetika’s promotion and announce plans to adopt a child. During the party, Meera learns that the caterer, Sophie, is Geetika’s former partner, while Meera’s mother—unaware of her daughter’s marriage—encourages her to meet a man named Rohit.

Soon after, Geetika is informed by the head of HR, Simran, that an anonymous complaint of sexual misconduct has been filed against her. Although assured of confidentiality, the allegation escalates when additional complaints surface online, damaging her reputation and jeopardizing the adoption process. An external investigator, Jaideep Bhargav, is appointed to examine the case. As scrutiny intensifies, Geetika’s past relationships with former intern Natasha and with Sophie draw suspicion. Meanwhile, Meera begins to question Geetika’s honesty after discovering that she concealed meetings with Sophie.

Tensions grow in both Geetika’s professional and personal life. A break-in at their home deepens her paranoia, while Meera, doubting her loyalty, hires a private investigator. Further allegations emerge from Dr. Carol Simmons, who accuses Geetika of misconduct; Geetika denies the claims, asserting that Carol is retaliating over a prior professional dispute. Evidence later reveals that the anonymous complaints originated from a single source and that the break-in was connected to David Brown, a hospital patient.

The investigation ultimately exposes Dr. Logan, a colleague and rival for the position of dean, as the orchestrator of the false allegations, motivated by professional jealousy. Although the charges against her are dropped and she is offered the deanship, Geetika declines, acknowledging her personal shortcomings.

In the aftermath, Geetika apologizes to Meera and seeks reconciliation. Though initially distant, Meera signals a willingness to rebuild their relationship, and the two leave together, suggesting a renewed beginning.

== Cast ==
- Konkona Sen Sharma as Dr. Geetika Sen, a senior gynaecological surgeon at Chapelstone General Hospital
- Pratibha Ranta as Dr. Meera Mishra, a pediatrics consultant at Willowbrook Childrens Hospital
- Mashhoor Amrohi as Jaideep Bhargav, a journalist turned private defective
- Sukant Goel as Mansoor, a private investigator hired by Meera
- Monica Mahendru as Simran, Head of HR at Chapelstone General Hospital
- Aditya Nanda as Angad, Meera's friend and co-worker
- Anuj Sachdeva as Prateek Sen
- Christopher W Jones as Dr. Logan
- Daniele Secondi as Dr. Martin Cooper, a gynaecological surgeon at Chapelstone General Hospital
- Kallirroi Tziafeta as Sophiana "Sophie" Sarandiz, Geetika's ex-girlfriend
- Sanjeeta Bhattacharya as Natasha, an ex-radiology intern who trained under Geetika
- Barbara Blum as Dr. Carol Simmons, an anesthesiologist accusing Geetika of sexual harassment
- Matylda McQuaid as Kate
- Geeta Thakkar as Meera's mother
- Shital Mahadik as Anjali, Geetika's maternal aunt
- Harish Lalwani as Anjali's husband

== Production ==
Accused was officially commissioned by Netflix, directed by Anubhuti Kashyap, written by Sima Agarwal and Yash Keshwani, and produced by Dharmatic Entertainment. Konkona Sen Sharma and Pratibha Ranta were cast as the leads. Principal photography began in November 2024, and concluded in December 2024, taking place in Europe and Mumbai.

== Release ==
The film was released on 27 February 2026 on Netflix.

== Reception ==
Accused received mixed-to-negative reviews from critics. On the review aggregator website Rotten Tomatoes, 38% of 16 critics' reviews are positive, with an average rating of 5.7/10.

Archika Khurana of The Times of India gave the movie 3.5/5 stars, writing "If you appreciate layered psychological dramas powered by nuanced performances rather than shocking twists, Accused is worth your time". Shubhra Gupta of The Indian Express gave 1.5/5 stars, writing "The writing offers us little depth, and that’s where this film, starring Konkona Sensharma and Pratibha Rannta, which had the potential to be a humdinger, falls flat". Sukanya Verma rated the movie 2.5/5 stars and wrote "Aside from a script scrambling to cram too much and not getting nearly enough right, a lot of Accused's dissatisfaction stems from the flimsy British supporting cast and Neel Adhikari's clueless background score." Lachmi Deb Roy of Firstpost gave 4 out of 5 stars, writing "Konkona Sen Sharma and Pratibha Ranta’s film shows how a celebrated doctor is accused of sexual misconduct just because she is strict and stern with her subordinates". Devesh Sharma of Filmfare gave 3.5/5 stars, "Accused is a relationship drama. Konkona Sen Sharma and Pratibha Rannta excel in their roles". Anuj Kumar for The Hindu wrote "The approach seamlessly intertwines the thriller genre with social commentary and psychological character study". A reviewer for The Quint felt "The mystery of what went wrong here—and how the film misfires so marvellously—is more enticing than anything the dull narrative has to offer." Anisha Rao writing for India Today rated the movie 2/5 stars and opined "The cinematography complements the unease, framing silences and glances as carefully as confrontations."
