= Prashant Pandey (lyricist) =

Indian lyricist and songwriter

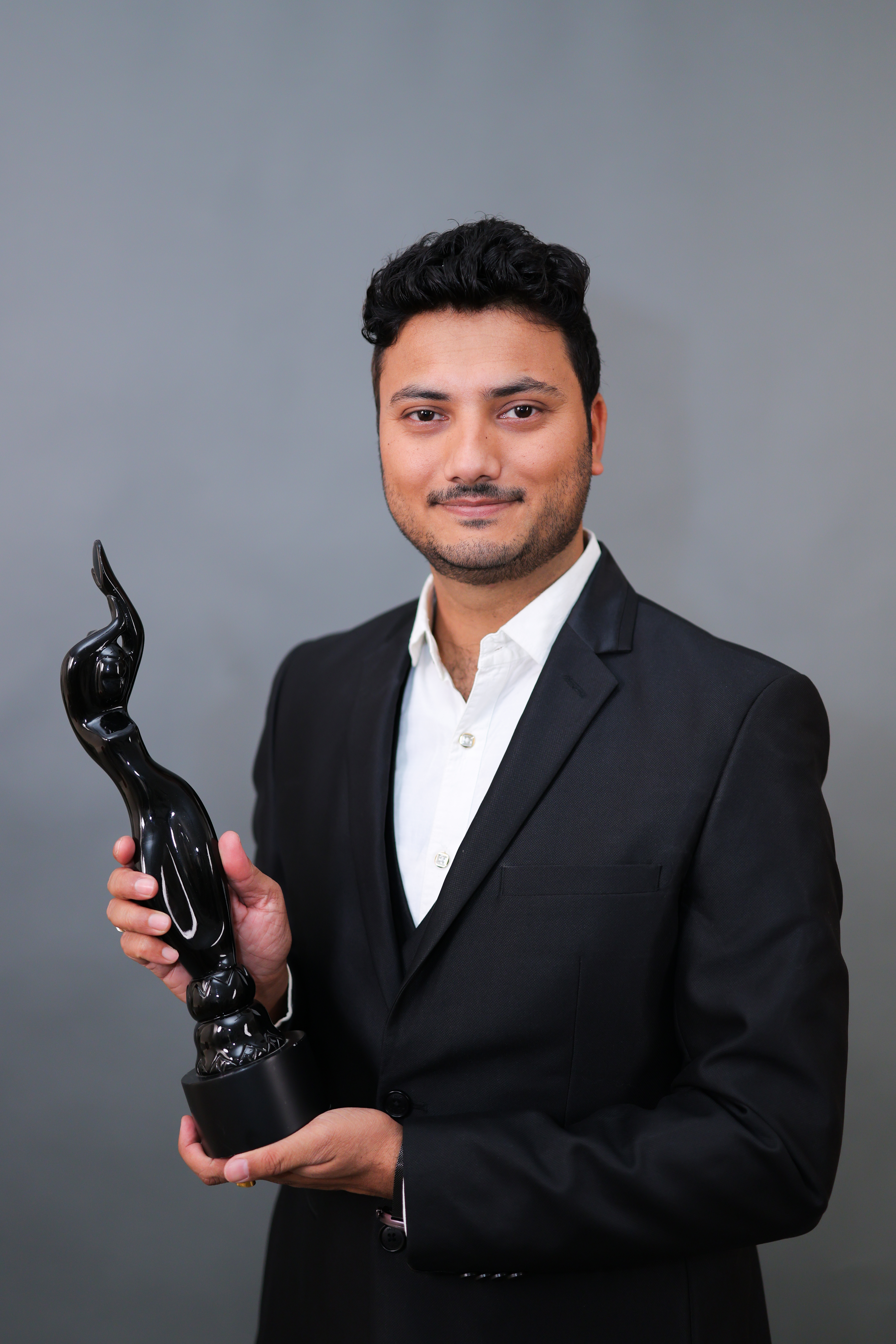
- Born: Mandsaur district, Madhya Pradesh, India
- Occupations: Lyricist, songwriter
- Writing career
- Notable awards: Filmfare Award; IIFA Award; Iconic Gold Award

Prashant Pandey is an Indian lyricist and songwriter who works in Hindi films, web series, and independent music. He is the recipient of the Filmfare Award, IIFA Award, Iconic Gold Award, and for Best Lyricist for the song "Sajni" from the 2024 Hindi film Laapataa Ladies.

== Early life and education ==
Pandey was born in Suwasra, a town in the Mandsaur district of Madhya Pradesh, India. His father, Devendra Pandey, and mother, Manjula Pandey, are government employees.

He was interested in music and singing from childhood and later developed an interest in songwriting and composition during his college years. After obtaining a degree in software engineering, he worked in a private company while continuing to write lyrics and share his compositions on social media, which eventually led to opportunities in the Hindi music industry.

== Career ==
Pandey began his career by writing and composing songs independently before entering the film industry.

His first major film project was Laapataa Ladies (2024), directed by Kiran Rao and produced by Aamir Khan Productions. He wrote the lyrics for the songs "Sajni" and "Beda Paar." The song "Sajni," performed by Arijit Singh and composed by Ram Sampath, received widespread critical and commercial acclaim, earning him several prestigious awards for Best Lyricist.

He has also written songs for web series, including "Naaraz" for Gutar Gu Season 3 (2025), and "Behaya Ishq," "Dilhara," "Tere Pichhe," and "Keh Du Kya" for Meri IIT Wali GF (2019).

In addition to his film and web projects, Pandey has contributed to independent singles such as the Hindi versions of "Rowdy Baby" (Maari 2) and "Jaadui" (Chennai Central), as well as original tracks including "Yaariyan," "O Maa," and "Kho Jaunga."

== Discography ==
=== Film songs ===
Year	Song	Film	Notes
2024	Sajni	Laapataa Ladies	Performed by Arijit Singh; composed by Ram Sampath; won Filmfare, IIFA, Iconic Gold, and Clef Music Awards for Best Lyricist
2024	Beda Paar	Laapataa Ladies	
2025	Humsafar	Saiyaara	Co-songwriter

=== Web series songs ===
Year	Song	Web Series	Notes
2019	Behaya Ishq	Meri IIT Wali GF	
2019	Dilhara	Meri IIT Wali GF	
2019	Tere Pichhe	Meri IIT Wali GF	
2019	Keh Du Kya	Meri IIT Wali GF	
2025	Naaraz	Gutar Gu – Season 3	
2026	Priyatama	Lakshmi Niwas	
2026	Lamha Lamha	TVF Aspirants	

=== Singles ===
Year	Song	Project / Album	Notes
2023	Yaariyan	Independent single	Original single
2025	Rowdy Baby	Maari 2 (Hindi version)	Hindi adaptation of Tamil hit
2025	Jaadui	Chennai Central (Hindi version)	Hindi adaptation track
2025	O Maa	Independent single	Original
2025	Kho Jaunga	Independent single	Original

== Awards ==
Year	Award	Song / Work
2024	Iconic Gold Award – Best Lyricist	"Sajni" (Laapataa Ladies)
2025	Filmfare Award – Best Lyricist	"Sajni" (Laapataa Ladies)
2025	IIFA Award – Best Lyricist	"Sajni" (Laapataa Ladies)
