= Filmfare Award for Best Female Debut =

Indian film award

Filmfare Awards for Best Female Debut
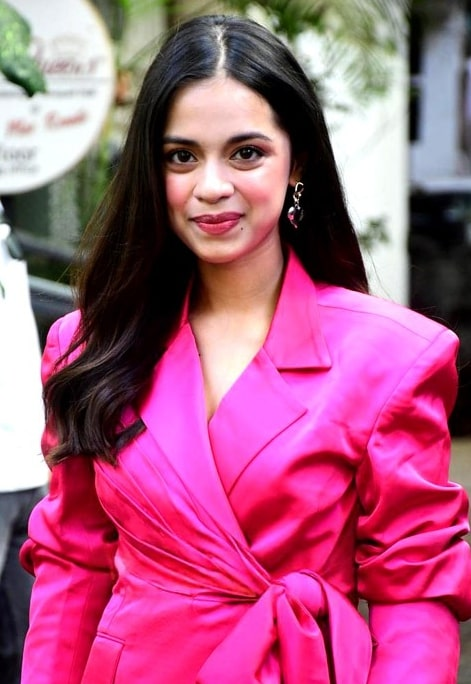
- The 2025 recipient: Nitanshi Goel
- Awarded for: Best Debut Performance by an Actress
- Country: India
- Presented by: Filmfare
- First award: Juhi Chawla; Qayamat Se Qayamat Tak (1989)
- Currently held by: Nitanshi Goel; Laapataa Ladies (2025)
- Website: Filmfare winners

The Filmfare Award for Best Female Debut (previously known as Filmfare Award for Lux New Face of the Year) is given by Filmfare as part of its annual Filmfare Awards for Hindi films to recognise a performance by a female actor in their debut role.

The first recipient of the award was Juhi Chawla, who was honored at the 34th Filmfare Awards in the year 1989. Preity Zinta and Ananya Panday are the only actresses who have won the award for 2 different films. As of 2021, Priyanka Chopra and Parineeti Chopra are the only cousins to win the award while Sara Ali Khan and Abhimanyu Dassani are the only winners whose parents (Saif Ali Khan and Bhagyashree respectively) have won a Filmfare Best Debut award. Divya Bharti is the only actress to win the award for her fifth film and not for her first film.

Juhi Chawla, Preity Zinta, Kareena Kapoor, Priyanka Chopra, Vidya Balan, Deepika Padukone, Kangana Ranaut and Kriti Sanon are the recipients who also won Filmfare Award for Best Actress, with Balan winning four times and Padukone winning twice.

Tabu, Kareena Kapoor, Priyanka Chopra, and Kangana Ranaut have all won the Filmfare Award for Best Actress (Critics) (Tabu winning the most at 4 times and Kapoor with 2 wins) and the Filmfare Award for Best Supporting Actress, while Vidya Balan has won the former award once. The award was not given in this category in the years 1997, 2010 and 2018. The most recent recipient of the award is Nitanshi Goel, who was honored at the 70th Filmfare Awards.

== Winners and nominees ==
Table key
†	Indicates the winner
‡	Indicates the performance was also nominated for the Filmfare Award for Best Actress

=== 1980s ===
Year	Photo of winner	Actress	Role	Film
1989 (Note: Awarded as "Lux New Face of the Year") (34th)		Juhi Chawla ‡	Rashmi Rajput	Qayamat Se Qayamat Tak
1989 (34th)		No Other Nominee		

=== 1990s ===
Year	Photo of winners	Actress	Role(s)	Film(s)
1990 (35th)		Bhagyashree †	Suman	Maine Pyar Kiya
1990 (35th)		No Other Nominee		
1991 (36th)		Pooja Bhatt †	Pooja Sarin	Daddy
1991 (36th)		No Other Nominee		
1992 (37th)		Raveena Tandon †	Kiran Khanna	Patthar Ke Phool
1992 (37th)		Madhoo	Pooja	Phool Aur Kaante
1992 (37th)		Manisha Koirala	Radha	Saudagar
1992 (37th)		Zeba Bakhtiar	Henna Khan	Henna
1993 (38th)		Divya Bharti ‡	Kaajal "Sonu" Pratap	Deewana
1993 (38th)		Ayesha Jhulka	Neelam Chaudhary	Khiladi
1993 (38th)		Kajol	Radhika	Bekhudi
1993 (38th)		Karisma Kapoor	Jyoti	Sapne Sajan Ke
1994 (39th)	-	Mamta Kulkarni †	Jyoti Tripathi	Aashik Awara
1994 (39th)	-	Shilpa Shetty	Seema Chopra	Baazigar
1995 (40th)		Sonali Bendre †	Sonali	Naaraaz
1995 (40th)		Tabu †	Mohini	Vijaypath
1995 (40th)		No Other Nominee		
1996 (41st)		Twinkle Khanna †	Tina Oberoi	Barsaat
1996 (41st)		No Other Nominee		
1997 (42nd)		Seema Biswas ‡	Phoolan Devi	Bandit Queen
1997 (42nd)		Priya Gill	Paro Shastri	Tere Mere Sapne
1998 (43rd)		Mahima Chaudhry ‡	Kusum Ganga	Pardes
1998 (43rd)		Aishwarya Rai	Ashi Kapoor	Aur Pyaar Ho Gaya
1998 (43rd)		Pooja Batra	Anita	Virasat
1999 (44th)		Preity Zinta †	Preeti Nair	Dil Se..
1999 (44th)		Preity Zinta †	Preeti Singh	Soldier
1999 (44th)		Isha Koppikar	Anita	Ek Tha Dil Ek Thi Dhadkan
1999 (44th)		Jyothika	Pallavi Sinha	Doli Saja Ke Rakhna

=== 2000s ===
Year	Photo of winners	Actress	Role(s)	Film
2000 (45th)		Nandita Das †	Shanta	1947: Earth
2000 (45th)		Soundarya	Radha Singh-Thakur	Sooryavansham
2001 (46th)		Kareena Kapoor †	Nazneen "Naaz" Ahmed	Refugee
2001 (46th)		Ameesha Patel	Sonia Saxena	Kaho Naa... Pyaar Hai
2001 (46th)		Keerthi Reddy	Pooja Sinha	Tera Jadoo Chal Gayaa
2001 (46th)		Preeti Jhangiani	Kiran	Mohabbatein
2001 (46th)		Shamita Shetty	Ishika	Mohabbatein
2002 (47th)		Bipasha Basu †	Neeta / Sonia Bajaj	Ajnabee
2002 (47th)		Dia Mirza	Reena Malhotra	Rehnaa Hai Terre Dil Mein
2003 (48th)		Esha Deol †	Eisha Singh	Koi Mere Dil Se Poochhe
2003 (48th)		Amrita Rao	Anjali Thapar / Nandini	Ab Ke Baras
2004 (49th)		Lara Dutta †	Kajal Singhania	Andaaz
2004 (49th)		Priyanka Chopra †	Jiya Singhania	Andaaz
2004 (49th)		Bhumika Chawla	Nirjara Bharadwaj	Tere Naam
2004 (49th)		Neha Dhupia	Sapna	Qayamat: City Under Threat
2004 (49th)		Rimi Sen	Anjali Patekar	Hungama
2005 (50th)		Ayesha Takia †	Priya Kapoor	Taarzan: The Wonder Car
2005 (50th)		No Other Nominee		
2006 (51st)		Vidya Balan †	Lalita Roy	Parineeta
2006 (51st)		No Other Nominee		
2007 (52nd)		Kangana Ranaut †	Simran	Gangster
2007 (52nd)		No Other Nominee		
2008 (53rd)		Deepika Padukone ‡	Shantipriya / Sandy	Om Shanti Om
2008 (53rd)		Hansika Motwani	Priya Bakshi	Aap Ka Suroor
2008 (53rd)		Jiah Khan	Jia	Nishabd
2008 (53rd)		Sonam Kapoor	Sakina	Saawariya
2008 (53rd)		Urvashi Sharma	Sophia D'Costa	Naqaab
2009 (54th)		Asin ‡	Kalpana Shetty	Ghajini
2009 (54th)		Adah Sharma	Lisa Singh Rathod	1920
2009 (54th)		Anushka Sharma	Taani Sahni	Rab Ne Bana Di Jodi
2009 (54th)		Mugdha Godse	Janet Sequeira	Fashion
2009 (54th)		Prachi Desai	Sakshi Shroff	Rock On!!
2009 (54th)		Sonal Chauhan	Zoya Mathur	Jannat

=== 2010s ===
Year	Photo of winners	Actress	Role(s)	Film
2010 (55th)	NOT AWARDED			
2011 (56th)		Sonakshi Sinha †	Rajjo Shreshawat	Dabangg
2011 (56th)		Amrita Puri	Shefali Thakur	Aisha
2011 (56th)		Sandeepa Dhar	Rajnandini Khandelwal	Isi Life Mein...!
2011 (56th)		Shraddha Kapoor	Aparna Khanna	Teen Patti
2011 (56th)		Trisha	Gehna Ganpule	Khatta Meetha
2012 (57th)		Parineeti Chopra †	Dimple Chaddha	Ladies vs Ricky Bahl
2012 (57th)		Kajal Aggarwal	Kavya Bhosle	Singham
2012 (57th)		Myra Karn	Jessica Lal	No One Killed Jessica
2012 (57th)		Nargis Fakhri	Heer Kaul	Rockstar
2013 (58th)		Ileana D'Cruz †	Shruti Ghosh Sengupta	Barfi!
2013 (58th)		Alia Bhatt	Shanaya Singhania	Student of the Year
2013 (58th)		Diana Penty	Meera Sahni	Cocktail
2013 (58th)		Yami Gautam	Ashima Roy	Vicky Donor
2014 (59th)		Vaani Kapoor †	Tara	Shuddh Desi Romance
2014 (59th)		No Other Nominee		
2015 (60th)		Kriti Sanon †	Dimpy Chaudhary	Heropanti
2015 (60th)		No Other Nominee		
2016 (61st)		Bhumi Pednekar †	Sandhya	Dum Laga Ke Haisha
2016 (61st)		No Other Nominee		
2017 (62nd)		Ritika Singh †	Ezhil Madhi	Saala Khadoos
2017 (62nd)		No Other Nominee		
2018 (63rd)	NOT AWARDED			
2019 (64th)		Sara Ali Khan †	Mandakini "Mukku"	Kedarnath
2019 (64th)		Banita Sandhu	Shiuli Iyer	October
2019 (64th)		Janhvi Kapoor	Parthavi Singh Rathore	Dhadak
2019 (64th)		Mouni Roy	Monobina Das	Gold
2019 (64th)		Radhika Madan	Chamki Kumari	Pataakha

=== 2020s ===
Year	Photo of winners	Actress	Role(s)	Film(s)
2020 (65th)		Ananya Panday †	Shreya Randhawa Tapasya Singh	Student of the Year 2 Pati Patni Aur Woh
2020 (65th)		Pranutan Bahl	Firdaus Quadri	Notebook
2020 (65th)		Saiee Manjrekar	Khushi Chautala	Dabangg 3
2020 (65th)		Sharmin Segal	Astha Tripathi	Malaal
2020 (65th)		Shivaleeka Oberoi	Mitee Deora	Yeh Saali Aashiqui
2020 (65th)		Tara Sutaria	Mridula "Mia" Chawla	Student of the Year 2
2021 (66th)		Alaya F †	Tia Singh	Jawaani Jaaneman
2021 (66th)		Sadia Khateeb	Shanti Dhar	Shikara
2022 (67th)		Sharvari †	Sonia Rawat / Jasmine "Jazz"	Bunty Aur Babli 2
2022 (67th)		No Other Nominee		
2023 (68th)		Andrea Kevichüsa †	Aido	Anek
2023 (68th)		Khushalii Kumar	Saanchi Sinha	Dhokha: Round D Corner
2023 (68th)		Manushi Chhillar	Sanyogita	Samrat Prithviraj
2023 (68th)		Prajakta Koli	Ginny Sahni	Jugjugg Jeeyo
2024 (69th)		Alizeh Agnihotri †	Nitya	Farrey
2024 (69th)		No Other Nominee		
2025 (70th)		Nitanshi Goel †	Phool Kumari	Laapataa Ladies
2025 (70th)		Ahilya Bamroo	Reya Sen	I Want to Talk
2025 (70th)		Anjini Dhawan	Bindiya "Binny" Singh	Binny and Family
2025 (70th)		Dhvani Bhanushali	Meera	Kahan Shuru Kahan Khatam
2025 (70th)		Pratibha Ranta	Jaya Tripathi Singh / Pushpa Rani	Laapataa Ladies
2025 (70th)		Pashmina Roshan	Sanya Malhotra	Ishq Vishk Rebound

== See also ==
- Filmfare Award for Best Male Debut
- Filmfare Award for Best Female Debut – South
- Filmfare Awards
- Hindi cinema
- Cinema of India
- List of Hindi film actresses
