= Ashlesha Thakur =

Indian actress

- Born: 19 October 2003 (age 23); Mumbai
- Occupations: Actress; model
- Years active: 2017-present

Ashlesha Thakur is an Indian actress and model. She is best known for playing the role of Dhriti Tiwari, daughter of Srikant Tiwari (played by Manoj Bajpayee) in the Hindi web series, The Family Man.

== Career ==
In 2017, Thakur started acting with a role in the TV show Shakti - Astitva Ke Ehsaas Ki on Colors TV. In the same year, she worked in the Hindi movie Jeena Isi Ka Naam Hai. She also acted in movies like Pagglait and web series like Sarvam Shakthi Mayam, Gutar Gu, and Gupt Gyaan.

She gained recognition for her role as Dhriti Tiwari, the daughter of Manoj Bajpayee and Priyamani, in the web series The Family Man. Recently in 2023, she did a film called Jawan, in which she played the role of Kalee Gaikwad's daughter named Alia, where Kalee was played by Vijay Sethupathi. In the same year, she played the titular character in a Telugu-language film Shanthala, thus making her debut in Tollywood. The film was released on 15 December 2023.

She has also done ads for brands like Himalaya, Kissan, Cadbury, Reliance Fresh, Amazon, Swiggy, Samsung, and L&T.

== Personal life ==
The popularity of The Family Man series brought Thakur into the limelight, and led to a significant rise in her social media following.

. Ashlesha Thakur’s height is around 5 feet and her weight is 48 kg. Her body measurements are 32-28-30 inches

== Filmography ==
=== Films ===
Year	Title	Role	Language	Notes
2017	Jeena Isi Ka Naam Hai	Unknown	Hindi	
2017	Badrinath Ki Dulhania	Young girl in school	Hindi	
2021	Pagglait	Aditi Giri	Hindi	
2023	Jawan	Alia Gaikwad	Hindi	
2023	Shantala	Shantala	Telugu	Tollywood debut

=== Television ===
Year	Title	Role	Language	Channel	Notes	Ref.
2017	Shakti: Astitva Ke Ehsaas Ki	Unknown	Hindi	Colors TV	61 episodes	
2019-Present	The Family Man	Dhriti Tiwari	Hindi	Amazon Prime Video		
2021	Gupt Gyaan	Ritu	Hindi	Amazon Mini TV	Short Film	
2023	Gutar Gu	Ritu Chauhan	Hindi	Amazon Mini TV	season 1,2,3	
2023	Sarvam Sakthi Mayam	Revathi	Hindi	ZEE5		
