= Madaari (2016 film) =

- Theatrical release poster
- Directed by: Nishikant Kamat
- Written by: Ritesh Shah
- Story by: Shailja Kejriwal
- Produced by: Shalija Kejriwal; Madan Paliwal; Supata Sikdar; Shailesh R Singh
- Starring: Irrfan Khan; Vishesh Bansal; Jimmy Sheirgill; Tushar Dalvi; Sadhil Kapoor
- Cinematography: Avinash Arun
- Edited by: Aarif Sheikh
- Music by: Songs: Vishal Bhardwaj; Sunny–Inder Bawra; Score: Sameer Phaterpekar
- Production company: Miraj Entertainment
- Distributed by: Pooja Entertainment; T-Series Films; Reliance Entertainment (International)
- Release date: 22 July 2016 (India)
- Country: India
- Language: Hindi
- Box office: ₹287 million

Madaari (transl. Puppeteer) is a 2016 Indian Hindi-language drama thriller film directed by Nishikant Kamat, in his final film as a director before his death in 2020. The film stars Irrfan Khan, Vishesh Bansal, Jimmy Shergill, Tushar Dalvi and Nitesh Pandey. It was released on 22 July 2016 and received positive reviews from critics, later gaining cult status. The film's plot is based on a real-life incident, the collapse of an under construction Metro bridge in Andheri, Mumbai, which occurred on 4 September 2012.

== Plot ==
A 10-year-old child, Rohan, is kidnapped from his hostel. Rohan is the only son of the Home Minister. The Paramilitary and the CBI storm into action. CBI officer Nachiket Verma heads the case and gets restraining orders from all the other security agencies to make sure that the kidnappers don't panic and kill Rohan. Initially, the case is thought of mistaken identity wherein the kidnapper might have tried to kidnap the friend of Rohan, Cheeku who was also drugged while kidnapping.

For a long time, there is silence from the kidnapper and everyone is left guessing as to who it might be, and at the same time, the investigation is kept extremely secret, so as to keep the kidnapper(s) from killing Rohan. Behind the scenes, the security agencies try to find the location of the kidnapper without raising any kind of suspicion. Rohan is actually kidnapped by Nirmal after being drugged by him. Rohan shows his anger towards Nirmal for kidnapping him. Nirmal shows Rohan a pre-recorded video of his friend Cheeku who is in a drugged state struggling with fear. Nirmal tells Rohan that Cheeku will be killed if he refuses to cooperate with him. Nirmal keeps traveling via public transport to evade his location.

One day, Nirmal calls Cheeku's father to convey a message to the Home Minister, Prashant Goswami, that Rohan was abducted on purpose. His demand is that he wants his son, who was lost in an act of negligence by the government, to be found. It is then revealed that Nirmal had a happy family with his son, Apu (short for Apurva) after his wife left them. Apu died when a bridge collapsed on him on his way to school. Moved and depressed by his loss, Nirmal decided to seek revenge from the politicians and others responsible for the death of his son.

The news becomes a hot item in the media. Towards the end, Nirmal travels back to his house in Mumbai with Rohan, and calls a TV news channel from there and demands all those who were involved in the bridge collapse, including the Home Minister, come to his house and also the news anchor to broadcast it to the people, threatening to kill Rohan and himself if they don't. He makes the bridge contractor, Goswami, and the ruling party's money man, confess their corrupt activities on a live broadcast on TV. Rohan indicates he understands why Nirmal did what he did and Rohan and Nirmal hug before Rohan leaves with his father. Nirmal surrenders to the police and is later seen immersing the articles his son was wearing (and the remains of his son in a schoolbag) when he died, in the sea while being under the custody of the police.

== Cast ==
- Irrfan Khan as Nirmal Kumar
- Vishesh Bansal as Rohan Goswami
- Jimmy Sheirgill as Nachiket Verma
- Tushar Dalvi as Prashant Goswami
- Uday Tikekar as Pratap Nimbalkar
- Nitesh Pandey as Sanjay Jagtap
- Rajeev Gupta as Mr. Bansal
- Sadhil Kapoor as Cheeku
- Ayesha Raza Mishra as Jaya Goswami, Rohan's mother and Prashant's wife

== Production ==
=== Filming ===
The film was shot in New Delhi, Rajasthan, Dehradun, Shimla and Mumbai.

== Music ==
The first song "Dama Dama Dam" from Madaari was released on 10 June 2016. Both songs were written by Irshad Kamil.

Track Listing
No.	Title	Music	Singer(s)	Length
1.	"Masoom Sa"	Inder Bawra, Sunny Bawra	Sukhwinder Singh	6:24
2.	"Dama Dama Dam"	Vishal Bhardwaj	Vishal Dadlani	4:19
Total length:				10:43

== Marketing ==
The first look poster of the film was unveiled through Twitter by Irrfan Khan and later the teaser of the film was revealed on YouTube on 10 May 2016. The trailer was released by T-Series on 11 May 2016 on YouTube.

== Reception ==
On Rotten Tomatoes, the film has an approval rating of 78% based on 9 reviews, and an average rating of 7.6/10.
