= Filmfare Award for Best Lyricist =

Annual award for Hindi films

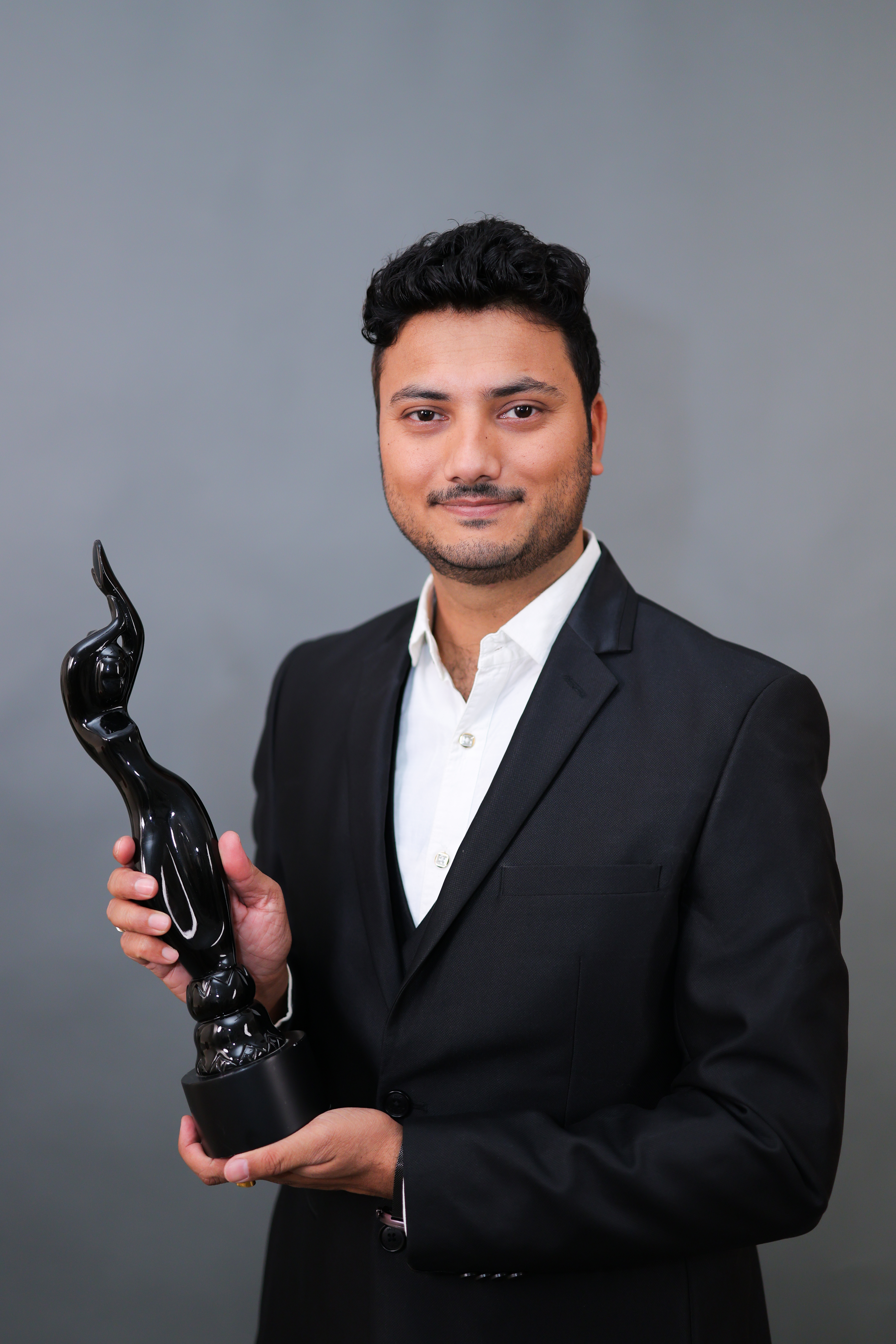
- The 70th recipient: Prashant Pandey
- Awarded for: Best Performance by a Lyricist
- Country: India
- Presented by: Filmfare
- First award: Shailendra, "Yeh Mera Deewanapan Hain"; Yahudi (1959)
- Currently held by: Prashant Pandey "Sajni"; Laapataa Ladies (2025)
- Website: Filmfare Awards

The Filmfare Award for Best Lyricist is an award in India given by the Filmfare magazine since 1959 as a part of its annual Filmfare Awards for Hindi films.

== Superlatives ==
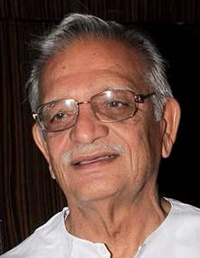
Gulzar holds the record of maximum wins in this category.

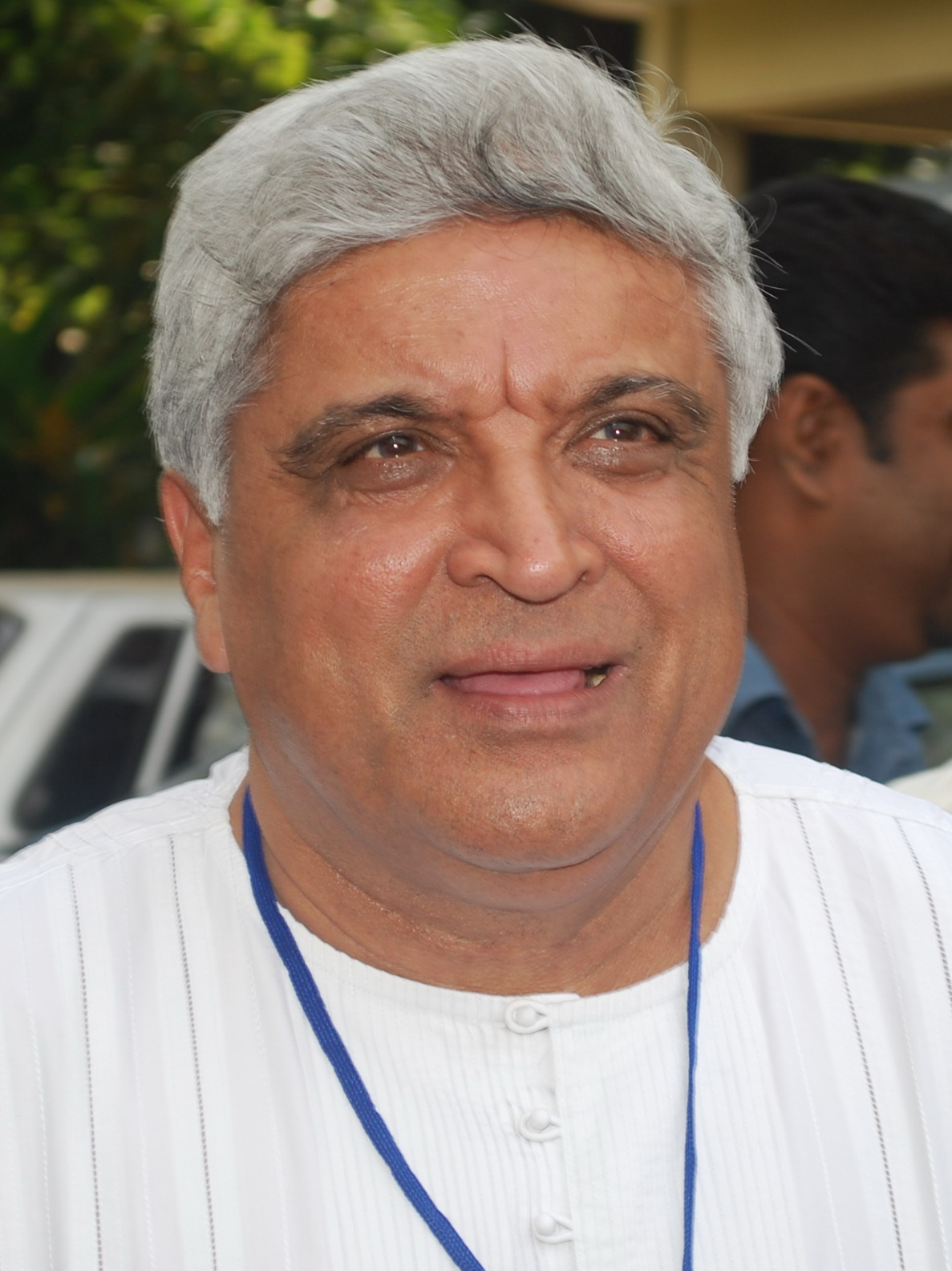
Javed Akhtar had all nominations in 2005.

Superlative	Lyricist	
Most awards	Gulzar	13 (from 35 nominations)
Most nominations	Anand Bakshi	41 (resulted in 4 wins)
Most nominations in a single year	Javed Akhtar (2005)	5 (all)
Most nominations without ever winning a single award	Anjaan	6

- Gulzar holds the record for the most wins in this category, with 13 awards, followed by Javed Akhtar with 8, and Anand Bakshi and Amitabh Bhattacharya with 4.
- Five lyricists have won the award three times each: Shakeel Badayuni, Shailendra, Sameer, Prasoon Joshi, and Irshad Kamil. Shakeel Badayuni holds the record for the most consecutive wins, having received the award in three successive years (1961–1963).
- In 2005, Javed Akhtar became the only lyricist to receive all five nominations in a single year, ultimately winning for the song "Tere Liye" from Veer-Zaara. This set the record for the most nominations by a lyricist in a single year, surpassing Anand Bakshi, who had received four of the five nominations in 1981.
- Anand Bakshi was nominated for 13 consecutive years, from 1970 to 1982, accumulating a total of 23 nominations. Despite his consistent presence, he secured only two wins during this period. In 1981, all four of his nominations lost to Gulzar, and in 1998, all three of his nominations lost to Javed Akhtar.
- Shailendra was the first recipient of the award in 1959. The 1960s were dominated by Shakeel Badayuni, who won three times. Verma Malik received two awards in the 1970s. Gulzar was the most awarded lyricist in the 1980s, with four wins. In the 1990s, Sameer and Javed Akhtar won three times each. Javed Akhtar continued his dominance in the 2000s with five wins. In the 2010s, Irshad Kamil and Gulzar both secured three awards each.
- As of 2022, only five women have been nominated for the Best Lyricist award. The first female nominee was Preeti Sagar in 1978, for the song "Mero Gaam Katha Parey" from Manthan. Rashmi Singh became the first woman to win the award, in 2015, for "Muskurane Ki Wajah" from CityLights.
- Kausar Munir became the second female lyricist to win, for the song "Lehra Do" from 83 in 2022. She is also the only female lyricist to receive multiple nominations, including multiple nominations in a single year. Of the total nine nominations ever received by female lyricists, five belong to Munir.
- Other female nominees include Rani Malik, nominated in 1991 for "Dheere Dheere" from Aashiqui, and Anvita Dutt, nominated in 2016 for "Gulaabo" from Shaandaar.

=== Multiple wins ===
Wins	Recipient
13	Gulzar
8	Javed Akhtar
4	Anand Bakshi, Amitabh Bhattacharya
3	Shakeel Badayuni, Shailendra, Sameer, Prasoon Joshi, Irshad Kamil
2	Hasrat Jaipuri, Verma Malik, Gulshan Kumar Mehta, Sahir Ludhianvi, Santosh Anand

=== Multiple nominations ===
Wins	Recipient
41	Anand Bakshi
36	Gulzar
27	Javed Akhtar
17	Sameer
14	Amitabh Bhattacharya
9	Sahir Ludhianvi, Irshad Kamil
8	Majrooh Sultanpuri
7	Prasoon Joshi
6	Shakeel Badayuni, Shailendra, Hasrat Jaipuri, Anjaan
5	Santosh Anand, Indeevar, Kausar Munir
4	Hasan Kamal, Mehboob, Swanand Kirkire
3	Neeraj, Gulshan Kumar Mehta, Dev Kohli, Niranjan Iyengar, Vishal Dadlani
2	Verma Malik, Saawan Kumar Tak, Prakash Mehra, Ravindra Jain, Sudhakar Sharma, Faaiz Anwar

== Winners and nominees ==
=== 1950s ===
Year	Photos of winners	Lyricist	Song	Film	Ref.
1959 (6th)		Shailendra †	"Yeh Mera Deewanapan Hain"	Yahudi	
1959 (6th)		Sahir Ludhianvi	"Aurat Ne Janam Diya"	Sadhna	
1959 (6th)		Shailendra	"Meri Jaan"	Yahudi	

=== 1960s ===
Year	Photos of winners	Lyricist	Song	Film	Ref.
1960 (7th)		Shailendra †	"Sab Kuchh Seekha Hum Ne"	Anari	
1960 (7th)		Majrooh Sultanpuri	"Jalte Hain Jiske Liye"	Sujata	
1960 (7th)		Sahir Ludhianvi	"Tu Hindu Banega"	Dhool Ka Phool	
1961 (8th)		Shakeel Badayuni †	"Chaudhvin Ka Chand"	Chaudhvin Ka Chand	
1961 (8th)		Shailendra	"Dil Apna Aur Preet Parai"	Dil Apna Aur Preet Parai	
1961 (8th)		Shakeel Badayuni	"Pyar Kiya To Darna Kiya"	Mughal-e-Azam	
1962 (9th)		Shakeel Badayuni †	"Husn Wale Tera"	Gharana	
1962 (9th)		Hasrat Jaipuri	"Teri Pyari Pyari Surat"	Sasural	
1962 (9th)		Shailendra	"Hothon Pe Sacchai"	Jis Desh Mein Ganga Behti Hai	
1963 (10th)		Shakeel Badayuni †	"Kahin Deep Jale"	Bees Saal Baad	
1963 (10th)		Hasrat Jaipuri	"Ae Gulbadan"	Professor	
1963 (10th)		Raja Mehdi Ali Khan	"Aapki Nazrone"	Anpadh	
1964 (11th)		Sahir Ludhianvi †	"Jo Waada Kiya"	Taj Mahal	
1964 (11th)		Sahir Ludhianvi	"Chalo Ek Bar Phir Se"	Gumrah	
1964 (11th)		Shakeel Badayuni	"Mere Mehboob Tujhe Meri"	Mere Mehboob	
1965 (12th)		Majrooh Sultanpuri †	"Chahunga Main Tujhe"	Dosti	
1965 (12th)		Bharat Vyas	"Jyot Se Jyot Jagate Chalo"	Sant Gyaneshwar	
1965 (12th)		Shailendra	"Dost Dost Na Raha"	Sangam	
1966 (13th)		Rajendra Krishan †	"Tumhi Mere Mandir"	Khandan	
1966 (13th)		Hasrat Jaipuri	"Aji Rooth Kar Ab Kahan"	Arzoo	
1966 (13th)		Indeevar	"Ek Tu Na Mila"	Himalay Ki God Mein	
1967 (14th)		Hasrat Jaipuri †	"Baharon Phool Barsao"	Suraj	
1967 (14th)		Shailendra	"Sajan Re Jhoot"	Teesri Kasam	
1967 (14th)		Shakeel Badayuni	"Naseeb Me Jiske"	Do Badan	
1968 (15th)		Gulshan Kumar Mehta †	"Mere Desh Ki Dharti"	Upkar	
1968 (15th)		Anand Bakshi	"Sawan Ka Mahina"	Milan	
1968 (15th)		Sahir Ludhianvi	"Neele Gagan Ke Tale"	Hamraaz	
1969 (16th)		Shailendra †	"Main Gaoon Tum"	Brahmachari	
1969 (16th)		Hasrat Jaipuri	"Dil Ke Jharoke Mein"	Brahmachari	
1969 (16th)		Sahir Ludhianvi	"Milti Hai Zindagi Mein"	Ankhen	

=== 1970s ===
Year	Photos of winners	Lyricist	Song	Film	Ref.
1970 (17th)		Neeraj †	"Kaal Ka Pahiya"	Chanda Aur Bijli	
1970 (17th)		Anand Bakshi	"Kora Kagaz Tha"	Aradhana	
1970 (17th)		Anand Bakshi	"Badi Mastani Hai"	Jeene Ki Raah	
1971 (18th)	–	Verma Malik †	"Sabse Bada Nadaan"	Pehchan	
1971 (18th)	–	Anand Bakshi	"Bindiya Chamkegi"	Do Raaste	
1971 (18th)	–	Neeraj	"Bas Yehi Apradh"	Pehchan	
1972 (19th)		Hasrat Jaipuri †	"Zindagi Ek Safar Hai Suhana"	Andaz	
1972 (19th)		Anand Bakshi	"Na Koi Umang Hai"	Kati Patang	
1972 (19th)		Neeraj	"Ae Bhai Zara Dekh Ke Chalo"	Mera Naam Joker	
1973 (20th)	–	Verma Malik †	"Jai Bolo Be-Imaan Ki"	Be-Imaan	
1973 (20th)	–	Anand Bakshi	"Chingari Koi Bhadke"	Amar Prem	
1973 (20th)	–	Santosh Anand	"Ek Pyaar Ka Nagma Hain"	Shor	
1974 (21st)		Gulshan Kumar Mehta †	"Yaari Hai Imaan Mera"	Zanjeer	
1974 (21st)		Anand Bakshi	"Hum Tum Ek Kamre Mein Band Ho"	Bobby	
1974 (21st)		Anand Bakshi	"Main Shayar To Nahin"	Bobby	
1974 (21st)		Indeevar	"Samjhauta Ghamose Kar Lo"	Samjhauta	
1974 (21st)		Vitthalbhai Patel	"Jhooth Bole Kauwa Kaate"	Bobby	
1975 (22nd)	–	Santosh Anand †	"Main Na Bhooloonga"	Roti Kapada Aur Makaan	
1975 (22nd)	–	Anand Bakshi	"Gaadi Bula Rahi Hai"	Dost	
1975 (22nd)	–	Indeevar	"Behnane Bhai Ki Kalai"	Resham Ki Dori	
1975 (22nd)	–	M. G. Hashmat	"Mera Jeevan Kora Kagaz"	Kora Kagaz	
1975 (22nd)	–	Santosh Anand	"Aur Nahi Bus Aur Nahin"	Roti Kapda Aur Makaan	
1976 (23rd)		Indeevar †	"Dil Aisa Kisi"	Amanush	
1976 (23rd)		Anand Bakshi	"Aayegi Zaroor Chiththi"	Dulhan	
1976 (23rd)		Anand Bakshi	"Mehbooba O Mehbooba"	Sholay	
1976 (23rd)		Gulzar	"Tere Bina Zindagi Se"	Aandhi	
1976 (23rd)		Vishweshwar Sharma	"Chal Sanyasi Mandir Mein"	Sanyasi	
1977 (24th)		Sahir Ludhianvi †	"Kabhi Kabhie Mere Dil Mein"	Kabhi Kabhie	
1977 (24th)		Anand Bakshi	"Mere Naina Sawan Bhadon"	Mehbooba	
1977 (24th)		Gulzar	"Dil Dhoondta Hai"	Mausam	
1977 (24th)		Majrooh Sultanpuri	"Ek Din Bik Jaayega"	Dharam Karam	
1977 (24th)		Sahir Ludhianvi	"Main Pal Do Pal Ka Shayar"	Kabhi Kabhie	
1978 (25th)		Gulzar †	"Do Deewaane Sheher Mein"	Gharaonda	
1978 (25th)		Anand Bakshi	"Parda Hai Parda"	Amar Akbar Anthony	
1978 (25th)		Gulzar	"Naam Gum Jaayega"	Kinara	
1978 (25th)		Majrooh Sultanpuri	"Kya Hua Tera Waada"	Hum Kisise Kum Naheen	
1978 (25th)		Preeti Sagar	"Mera Gaon Kadhapane"	Manthan	
1979 (26th)		Anand Bakshi †	"Aadmi Musafir Hai"	Apnapan	
1979 (26th)		Anand Bakshi	"Main Tulsi Tere Aangan Ki"	Main Tulsi Tere Aangan Ki	
1979 (26th)		Anjaan	"Khaike Paan Banaraswala"	Don	
1979 (26th)		Pandit Narendra Sharma	"Satyam Shivam Sundaram"	Satyam Shivam Sundaram	
1979 (26th)		Ravindra Jain	"Ankhiyon Ke Jharokhon Se"	Ankhiyon Ke Jharokhon Se	

=== 1980s ===
Year	Photos of winners	Lyricist	Song	Film	Ref.
1980 (27th)		Gulzar †	"Aanewala Pal"	Gol Maal	
1980 (27th)		Anand Bakshi	"Saawan Ke Jhoole Pade"	Jurmana	
1980 (27th)		Anand Bakshi	"Dafliwale"	Sargam	
1980 (27th)		Jan Nisar Akhtar	"Aaja Re Mere Dilbar Aaja"	Noorie	
1980 (27th)		Sahir Ludhianvi	"Dil Ke Tukde Tukde Kar Ke"	Dada	
1981 (28th)		Gulzar †	"Hazaar Raahen Mud Ke Dekhi"	Thodisi Bewafaii	
1981 (28th)		Anand Bakshi	"Dard-e-Dil"	Karz	
1981 (28th)		Anand Bakshi	"Om Shanti Om"	Karz	
1981 (28th)		Anand Bakshi	"Salaamat Rahe Dostana Hamara"	Dostana	
1981 (28th)		Anand Bakshi	"Shisha Ho Ya Dil Ho"	Aasha	
1982 (29th)		Anand Bakshi †	"Tere Mere Beech Mein"	Ek Duuje Ke Liye	
1982 (29th)		Anand Bakshi	"Solah Baras Ki Bali Umar"	Ek Duuje Ke Liye	
1982 (29th)		Anand Bakshi	"Yaad Aa Rahi Hai"	Love Story	
1982 (29th)		Gulzar	"Jahaan Pe Savera"	Baseraa	
1982 (29th)		Santosh Anand	"Zindagi Ki Naa Toote"	Kranti	
1983 (30th)	–	Santosh Anand †	"Mohabbat Hai Kya Cheez"	Prem Rog	
1983 (30th)	–	Amir Qazalbash	"Meri Kismat"	Prem Rog	
1983 (30th)	–	Anjaan & Prakash Mehra	"Pag Ghungroo Baandh"	Namak Halaal	
1983 (30th)	–	Hasan Kamal	"Dil Ke Armaan"	Nikaah	
1983 (30th)	–	Hasan Kamal	Hasan Kamal – "Dil Ki Yeh Arzoo Thi" from Nikaah	Nikaah	
1984 (31st)		Gulzar †	"Tujhse Naraaz Nahi Zindagi"	Masoom	
1984 (31st)		Anand Bakshi	"Jab Hum Jawaan Honge"	Betaab	
1984 (31st)		Gulshan Kumar Mehta	"Hume Aur Jeene Ki"	Agar Tum Na Hote	
1984 (31st)		Saawan Kumar Tak	"Shayad Meri Shaadi Ka Khayal"	Souten	
1984 (31st)		Saawan Kumar Tak	"Zindagi Pyaar Ka Geet Hai"	Souten	
1985 (32nd)	–	Hasan Kamal †	"Aaj Ki Awaaz"	Aaj Ki Awaaz	
1985 (32nd)	–	Anand Bakshi	"Sohni Chenab Di"	Sohni Mahiwal	
1985 (32nd)	–	Anjaan	"Manzilein Apni Jagah Hain"	Sharaabi	
1985 (32nd)	–	Anjaan and Prakash Mehra	"Intehaa Ho Gayi"	Sharaabi	
1985 (32nd)	–	Indeevar	"Pyaar Ka Tohfa Tera"	Tohfa	
1986 (33rd)	–	Vasant Dev †	"Mann Kyon Behka"	Utsav	
1986 (33rd)	–	Anand Bakshi	"Zindagi Har Kadam"	Meri Jung	
1986 (33rd)	–	Anjaan	"Yaar Bina Chain Kahaan Re"	Saaheb	
1986 (33rd)	–	Hasan Kamal	"Bahut Der Se"	Tawaif	
1986 (33rd)	–	Hasrat Jaipuri	"Sun Sahiba Sun"	Ram Teri Ganga Maili	
1986 (33rd)	–	Javed Akhtar	"Saagar Kinare"	Saagar	
1987	NO CEREMONY HELD				
1988	NO CEREMONY HELD				
1989 (34th)		Gulzar †	"Mera Kuchh Saamaan"	Ijaazat	
1989 (34th)		Javed Akhtar	"Ek Do Teen"	Tezaab	
1989 (34th)		Majrooh Sultanpuri	"Papa Kehte Hain"	Qayamat Se Qayamat Tak	

=== 1990s ===
Year	Photos of winners	Lyricist	Song	Film	Ref.
1990 (35th)	–	Asad Bhopali †	"Dil Deewana"	Maine Pyar Kiya	
1990 (35th)	–	Anand Bakshi	"Lagi Aaj Sawan"	Chandni	
1990 (35th)	–	Dev Kohli	"Aate Jaate Hanste Gaate"	Maine Pyar Kiya	
1991 (36th)		Sameer †	"Nazar Ke Saamne"	Aashiqui	
1991 (36th)		Rani Malik	"Dheere Dheere Se"	Aashiqui	
1991 (36th)		Sameer	"Naa Jaane Kahan Dil Kho Gaya"	Dil	
1992 (37th)		Gulzar †	"Yaara Seeli Seeli"	Lekin...	
1992 (37th)		Anand Bakshi	"Kabhi Main Kahoon"	Lamhe	
1992 (37th)		Faaiz Anwar	"Dil Hai Ke Manta Nahin"	Dil Hai Ke Manta Nahin	
1992 (37th)		Ravindra Jain	"Main Hoon Khushrang Henna"	Henna	
1992 (37th)		Sameer	"Mera Dil Bhi"	Saajan	
1993 (38th)		Sameer †	"Teri Umeed Tera Intezar Karte Hai"	Deewana	
1993 (38th)		Majrooh Sultanpuri	"Woh Sikander Hi Doston"	Jo Jeeta Wohi Sikandar	
1993 (38th)		Sameer	"Aisi Deewangi"	Deewana	
1994 (39th)		Sameer †	"Ghunghat Ki Aad Se"	Hum Hain Rahi Pyar Ke	
1994 (39th)		Anand Bakshi	"Choli Ke Peeche Kya Hai"	Khalnayak	
1994 (39th)		Anand Bakshi	"Jaadu Teri Nazar"	Darr	
1994 (39th)		Dev Kohli	"Yeh Kaali Kaali Aankhen"	Baazigar	
1994 (39th)		Gulzar	"Dil Hum Hum"	Rudaali	
1995 (40th)		Javed Akhtar †	"Ek Ladki Ko Dekha"	1942: A Love Story	
1995 (40th)		Anand Bakshi	"Tu Cheez Badi Mast Mast"	Mohra	
1995 (40th)		Dev Kohli	"Hum Aapke Hain Koun"	Hum Aapke Hain Koun..!	
1995 (40th)		Sameer	"Ole Ole"	Yeh Dillagi	
1996 (41st)		Anand Bakshi †	"Tujhe Dekha To"	Dilwale Dulhania Le Jayenge	
1996 (41st)		Anand Bakshi	"Ho Gaya Hai Tujhko To Pyar Sajna"	Dilwale Dulhania Le Jayenge	
1996 (41st)		Majrooh Sultanpuri	"Raja Ko Rani Se Pyar Ho Gaya"	Akele Hum Akele Tum	
1996 (41st)		Mehboob	"Kya Kare"	Rangeela	
1996 (41st)		Mehboob	"Tanha Tanha"	Rangeela	
1997 (42nd)		Javed Akhtar †	"Ghar Se Nikalte Hi"	Papa Kehte Hai	
1997 (42nd)		Gulzar	"Chappa Chappa Charkha Chale"	Maachis	
1997 (42nd)		Majrooh Sultanpuri	"Aaj Main Upar"	Khamoshi: The Musical	
1997 (42nd)		Nida Fazli	"Jeevan Kya Hai"	Is Raat Ki Subah Nahin	
1997 (42nd)		Sameer	"Pardesi Pardesi"	Raja Hindustani	
1998 (43rd)		Javed Akhtar †	"Sandese Aate Hai"	Border	
1998 (43rd)		Anand Bakshi	"Bholi Si Surat"	Dil To Pagal Hai	
1998 (43rd)		Anand Bakshi	"I Love My India"	Pardes	
1998 (43rd)		Anand Bakshi	"Zara Tasveer Se Tu"	Pardes	
1998 (43rd)		Javed Akhtar	"Chand Taare"	Yes Boss	
1999 (44th)		Gulzar †	"Chaiyya Chaiyya"	Dil Se..	
1999 (44th)		Gulzar	"Ae Ajnabi"	Dil Se..	
1999 (44th)		Javed Akhtar	"Mere Mehboob Mere Sanam"	Duplicate	
1999 (44th)		Sameer	"Kuch Kuch Hota Hai"	Kuch Kuch Hota Hai	
1999 (44th)		Sameer	"Ladki Badi Anjaani Hai"	Kuch Kuch Hota Hai	

=== 2000s ===
Year	Photos of winners	Lyricist	Song	Film	Ref.
2000 (45th)		Anand Bakshi †	"Ishq Bina"	Taal	
2000 (45th)		Anand Bakshi	"Taal Se Taal Mila"	Taal	
2000 (45th)		Israr Ansari	"Zindagi Maut Na Ban Jaaye"	Sarfarosh	
2000 (45th)		Mehboob	"Aankhon Ki Gustakhiyan"	Hum Dil De Chuke Sanam	
2000 (45th)		Mehboob	"Tadap Tadap Ke"	Hum Dil De Chuke Sanam	
2001 (46th)		Javed Akhtar †	"Panchchi Nadiyaan"	Refugee	
2001 (46th)		Anand Bakshi	"Humko Humise Churaalo"	Mohabbatein	
2001 (46th)		Gulzar	"Aaja Mahiya"	Fiza	
2001 (46th)		Ibrahim Ashk	"Naa Tum Jaano Naa Hum"	Kaho Naa... Pyaar Hai	
2001 (46th)		Sameer	"Tum Dil Ki Dhadkan Mein"	Dhadkan	
2002 (47th)		Javed Akhtar †	"Mitwa"	Lagaan	
2002 (47th)		Anand Bakshi	"Udja Kale Kawan"	Gadar: Ek Prem Katha	
2002 (47th)		Anil Pandey	"Suraj Hua Maddham"	Kabhi Khushi Kabhie Gham	
2002 (47th)		Javed Akhtar	"Radha Kaise Naa Jale"	Lagaan	
2002 (47th)		Sameer	"Kabhi Khushi Kabhie Gham"	Kabhi Khushi Kabhie Gham	
2003 (48th)		Gulzar †	"Saathiya"	Saathiya	
2003 (48th)		Nusrat Badr	"Dola Re"	Devdas	
2003 (48th)		Sameer	"Aapke Pyaar Mein"	Raaz	
2003 (48th)		Sudhakar Sharma	"Sanam Mere Humraaz"	Humraaz	
2003 (48th)		Sudhakar Sharma	"Tumne Zindagi Mein Aake"	Humraaz	
2004 (49th)		Javed Akhtar †	"Kal Ho Naa Ho"	Kal Ho Naa Ho	
2004 (49th)		Javed Akhtar	"Tauba Tumhare Yeh Ishaare"	Chalte Chalte	
2004 (49th)		Javed Akhtar	"Ek Saathi Aur Bhi Tha"	LOC Kargil	
2004 (49th)		Sameer	"Kisi Se Tum Pyaar Karo"	Andaaz	
2004 (49th)		Sameer	"Tere Naam"	Tere Naam	
2005 (50th)		Javed Akhtar †	"Tere Liye"	Veer-Zaara	
2005 (50th)		Javed Akhtar	"Aisa Des Hai Mera"	Veer-Zaara	
2005 (50th)		Javed Akhtar	"Main Hoon Na"	Main Hoon Na	
2005 (50th)		Javed Akhtar	"Main Yahaan Hoon"	Veer-Zaara	
2005 (50th)		Javed Akhtar	"Yeh Taara Woh Taara"	Swades	
2006 (51st)		Gulzar †	"Kajra Re"	Bunty Aur Babli	
2006 (51st)		Gulzar	"Chup Chup Ke"	Bunty Aur Babli	
2006 (51st)		Gulzar	"Dheere Jalna"	Paheli	
2006 (51st)		Sameer	"Aashiq Banaya Aapne"	Aashiq Banaya Aapne	
2006 (51st)		Swanand Kirkire	"Piyu Bole"	Parineeta	
2007 (52nd)		Prasoon Joshi †	"Chand Sifarish"	Fanaa	
2007 (52nd)		Gulzar	"Beedi"	Omkara	
2007 (52nd)		Javed Akhtar	"Kabhi Alvida Naa Kehna"	Kabhi Alvida Naa Kehna	
2007 (52nd)		Javed Akhtar	"Mitwa"	Kabhi Alvida Naa Kehna	
2007 (52nd)		Prasoon Joshi	"Roobaroo"	Rang De Basanti	
2008 (53rd)		Prasoon Joshi †	"Maa"	Taare Zameen Par	
2008 (53rd)		Gulzar	"Tere Bina"	Guru	
2008 (53rd)		Javed Akhtar	"Main Agar Kahoon"	Om Shanti Om	
2008 (53rd)		Sameer	"Jab Se Tere Naina"	Saawariya	
2008 (53rd)		Vishal Dadlani	"Aankhon Mein Teri"	Om Shanti Om	
2009 (54th)		Javed Akhtar †	"Jashn-E-Bahaara"	Jodhaa Akbar	
2009 (54th)		Abbas Tyrewala	"Kabhi Kabhi Aditi"	Jaane Tu... Ya Jaane Na	
2009 (54th)		Gulzar	"Tu Meri Dost Hai"	Yuvvraaj	
2009 (54th)		Jaideep Sahni	"Haule Haule"	Rab Ne Bana Di Jodi	
2009 (54th)		Javed Akhtar	"Socha Hai"	Rock On!!	
2009 (54th)		Prasoon Joshi	"Guzaarish"	Ghajini	

=== 2010s ===
Year	Photos of winners	Lyricist	Song	Film	Ref.
2010 (55th)		Irshad Kamil †	"Aaj Din Chadheya"	Love Aaj Kal	
2010 (55th)		Gulzar	"Dhan Te Nan"	Kaminey	
2010 (55th)		Gulzar	"Kaminey"	Kaminey	
2010 (55th)		Javed Akhtar	"Iktara"	Wake Up Sid	
2010 (55th)		Prasoon Joshi	"Masakali"	Delhi-6	
2010 (55th)		Prasoon Joshi	"Rehna Tu"	Delhi-6	
2011 (56th)		Gulzar †	"Dil Toh Bachcha Hai Ji"	Ishqiya	
2011 (56th)		Faaiz Anwar	"Tere Mast Mast Do Nain"	Dabangg	
2011 (56th)		Niranjan Iyengar	"Sajda"	My Name Is Khan	
2011 (56th)		Niranjan Iyengar	"Noor-e-Khuda"	My Name Is Khan	
2011 (56th)		Vishal Dadlani	"Bin Tere"	I Hate Luv Storys	
2012 (57th)		Irshad Kamil †	"Nadaan Parindey"	Rockstar	
2012 (57th)		Gulzar	"Darling"	7 Khoon Maaf	
2012 (57th)		Irshad Kamil	"Sadda Haq"	Rockstar	
2012 (57th)		Javed Akhtar	"Señorita"	Zindagi Na Milegi Dobara	
2012 (57th)		Vishal Dadlani and Niranjan Iyengar	"Chammak Challo"	Ra.One	
2013 (58th)		Gulzar †	"Challa"	Jab Tak Hai Jaan	
2013 (58th)		Amitabh Bhattacharya	"Abhi Mujh Mein Kahin"	Agneepath	
2013 (58th)		Gulzar	"Saans"	Jab Tak Hai Jaan	
2013 (58th)		Javed Akhtar	"Jee Le Zaara"	Talaash: The Answer Lies Within	
2013 (58th)		Swanand Kirkire	"Aashiyan"	Barfi!	
2014 (59th)		Prasoon Joshi †	"Zinda"	Bhaag Milkha Bhaag	
2014 (59th)		Amitabh Bhattacharya	"Shikayatein"	Lootera	
2014 (59th)		Amitabh Bhattacharya	"Kabira"	Yeh Jawaani Hai Deewani	
2014 (59th)		Mithoon	"Tum Hi Ho"	Aashiqui 2	
2014 (59th)		Swanand Kirkire	"Manja"	Kai Po Che!	
2015 (60th)	–	Rashmi Singh †	"Muskurane"	CityLights	
2015 (60th)	–	Amitabh Bhattacharya	"Zehnaseeb"	Hasee Toh Phasee	
2015 (60th)	–	Gulzar	"Bismil"	Haider	
2015 (60th)	–	Irshad Kamil	"Pathaka Guddi"	Highway	
2015 (60th)	–	Kausar Munir	"Suno Na Sangemarmar"	Youngistaan	
2016 (61st)		Irshad Kamil †	"Agar Tum Saath Ho"	Tamasha	
2016 (61st)		Amitabh Bhattacharya	"Gerua"	Dilwale	
2016 (61st)		Anvita Dutt Guptan	"Gulaabo"	Shaandaar	
2016 (61st)		Gulzar	"Zinda"	Talvar	
2016 (61st)		Kumaar	"Sooraj Dooba Hain"	Roy	
2016 (61st)		Varun Grover	"Moh Moh Ke Dhaage"	Dum Laga Ke Haisha	
2017 (62nd)		Amitabh Bhattacharya †	"Channa Mereya"	Ae Dil Hai Mushkil	
2017 (62nd)		Irshad Kamil	"Jag Ghoomeya"	Sultan	
2017 (62nd)		Gulzar	"Aave Re Hitchki"	Mirzya	
2017 (62nd)		Gulzar	"Mirzya"	Mirzya	
2017 (62nd)		Kausar Munir	"Love You Zindagi"	Dear Zindagi	
2017 (62nd)		Shiv Kumar Batalvi	"Ikk Kudi"	Udta Punjab	
		Amitabh Bhattacharya †	"Galti Se Mistake"	Jagga Jasoos	
2018 (63rd)		Amitabh Bhattacharya	"Ullu Ka Pattha"	Jagga Jasoos	
2018 (63rd)		Arko Pravo Mukherjee	"Nazm Nazm"	Bareilly Ki Barfi	
2018 (63rd)		Kausar Munir	"Maana Ke Hum Yaar Nahin"	Meri Pyaari Bindu	
2018 (63rd)		Kausar Munir	"Nachdi Phira"	Secret Superstar	
2018 (63rd)		Santanu Ghatak	"Rafu"	Tumhari Sulu	
2019 (64th)		Gulzar †	"Ae Watan"	Raazi	
2019 (64th)		A. M. Turaz	"Binte Dil"	Padmaavat	
2019 (64th)		Gulzar	"Dilbaro"	Raazi	
2019 (64th)		Irshad Kamil	"Mera Naam Tu"	Zero	
2019 (64th)		Kumaar	"Tera Yaar Hoon Main"	Sonu Ke Titu Ki Sweety	
2019 (64th)		Shekhar Astitva	"Kar Har Maidaan Fateh"	Sanju	

=== 2020s ===
Year	Photos of winners	Lyricist	Song	Film	Ref.
2020 (65th)		Divine and Ankur Tewari †	"Apna Time Aayega"	Gully Boy	
2020 (65th)		Amitabh Bhattacharya	"Kalank"	Kalank	
2020 (65th)		Irshad Kamil	"Bekhayali"	Kabir Singh	
2020 (65th)		Manoj Muntashir	"Teri Mitti"	Kesari	
2020 (65th)		Mithoon	"Tujhe Kitna Chahne Lage Hum"	Kabir Singh	
2020 (65th)		Tanishk Bagchi	"Ve Maahi"	Kesari	
2021 (66th)		Gulzar †	"Chhapaak"	Chhapaak	
2021 (66th)		Irshad Kamil	"Mehrama"	Love Aaj Kal	
2021 (66th)		Irshad Kamil	"Shayad"	Love Aaj Kal	
2021 (66th)		Sayeed Quadri	"Humdum Hardam"	Ludo	
2021 (66th)		Shakeel Azmi	"Ek Tukda Dhoop"	Thappad	
2021 (66th)		Vayu	"Mere Liye Tum Kaafi Ho"	Shubh Mangal Zyada Saavdhan	
2022 (67th)	–	Kausar Munir †	"Lehra Do"	83	
2022 (67th)	–	Irshad Kamil	"Rait Zara Si"	Atrangi Re	
2022 (67th)	–	Jaani	"Mann Bharrya 2.0"	Shershaah	
2022 (67th)	–	Manoj Muntashir	"Parinda"	Saina	
2022 (67th)	–	Tanishk Bagchi	"Raataan Lambiya"	Shershaah	
2023 (68th)		Amitabh Bhattacharya †	"Kesariya"	Brahmāstra: Part One – Shiva	
2023 (68th)		Amitabh Bhattacharya	"Tere Hawaale"	Laal Singh Chaddha	
2023 (68th)		Amitabh Bhattacharya	Apna Bana Le	Bhediya	
2023 (68th)		Shellee	"Maiyya Mainu"	Jersey	
2023 (68th)		A. M. Turaz	"Jab Saiyaan"	Gangubai Kathiawadi	
2024 (69th)		Amitabh Bhattacharya †	"Tere Vaaste"	Zara Hatke Zara Bachke	
2024 (69th)		Amitabh Bhattacharya	"Tum Kya Mile"	Rocky Aur Rani Kii Prem Kahaani	
2024 (69th)		Gulzar	"Itni Si Baat"	Sam Bahadur	
2024 (69th)		Javed Akhtar	"Nikle The Kabhi Hum Ghar Se"	Dunki	
2024 (69th)		Siddharth–Garima	"Satranga"	Animal	
2024 (69th)		Swanand Kirkire and I. P. Singh	"Lutt Putt Gaya"	Dunki	
2025 (70th)	–	Prashant Pandey	"Sajni"	Lapataa Ladies	
2025 (70th)	–	Kausar Munir	"Sarphira"	Chandu Champion	
2025 (70th)	–	Siddhant Kaushal	"Nikat"	Kill	
2025 (70th)	–	Swanand Kirkire	"Dheeme Dheeme"	Laapataa Ladies	
2025 (70th)	–	Varun Grover	"Raat Akeli Thi"	Merry Christmas	

== See also ==
- Filmfare Awards
