= Vishesh Bansal =

Indian television actor (born 2004)

- Born: 3 October 2004 (age 21); Mumbai, Maharashtra, India
- Occupation: Actor
- Years active: 2011–present
- Known for: Yeh Meri Family

Vishesh Bansal (born 3 October 2004) is an Indian actor. He was brought up in Mumbai, India. He is known for portraying Child Karn in Suryaputra Karn and Harshal Gupta in Yeh Meri Family and in crime thriller TV series Asur.

== Career ==
Bansal has acted in several shows, including the 2011 Triangle Film Company's mythological series Devon Ke Dev...Mahadev as Grihpati on Life OK, also known playing a role in 4 Lions Films romantic-drama series Iss Pyaar Ko Kya Naam Doon? as Arnav and Khushi's adopted son as Aarav Singh Raizada on Star Plus, the first season of the drama series Na Bole Tum Na Maine Kuch Kaha as Aditya Vyas, and the 2013 romance-drama series Beintehaa as Zain and Aliya's son Zayed Zain Abdullah on Colors TV.

Later he gave an audition and selected to play the main lead in mythological series Buddha. He portrayed alongside an ensemble cast, including Sameer Dharmadhikari, Nigaar Khan, Kabir Bedi, Gungun Uprari, played the role of young King Siddharth / Buddha. The story of the show is based on the life of Gautama Buddha. The show produced by B.K. Modi and was aired on Zee TV from July 2013.

Bansal also featured in a Bollywood Movie Bombay Talkies released in 2013, in a story "Sheila Ki Jawani". Directed by Zoya Akhtar, he was shown as a young boy desiring to become a policeman in future.

By the end of June 2015, Bansal featured to play the protagonist in Swastik Pictures' mythological-drama series Suryaputra Karn, in which he was cast alongside Mouli Ganguly and Anand Suryavanshi, played the lead role of a very young Karna. The show is based on the journey of the warrior Karna, one of the central character from the Mahabharata. The show was created and produced by Siddharth Kumar Tewary and it airs on Sony Entertainment Television from 29 June 2015. Later, he was replaced by Basant Bhatt after ten years leap in the show on 18 August 2015.

== Filmography ==
=== Films ===
Year	Title	Role	Ref.
2013	Bombay Talkies	Unnamed	
2016	Madaari	Rohan Goswami	

=== Television ===
Year	Title	Role	Ref.
2012	Na Bole Tum Na Maine Kuch Kaha	Aditya "Addu" Vyas	
2012	Iss Pyaar Ko Kya Naam Doon?	Aarav Singh Raizada	
2012	Devon Ke Dev...Mahadev	Grihpati	
2013	Hongey Judaa Na Hum	Chintu Rajiv Mishra	
2013	Buddha	Young Prince Siddhartha	
2014	Beintehaa	Zayed Zain Abdullah	
2015	Suryaputra Karn	Child Karna	
2016–2017	Kuch Rang Pyar Ke Aise Bhi	Young Devrath "Dev" Dixit	

=== Web series ===
Year	Title	Role	Ref.
2018	Yeh Meri Family	Harshal "Harshu" Gupta	
2020	Asur	Shubh	
2020	Scam 1992	Young Harshad Mehta	
2021	Gupt Gyan	Anuj	
2023	Asur 2	Shubh	
2023	Gutar Gu	Anuj	

== Awards and nominations ==
Year	Recipient	Category	Nominated work	Result	Ref.
2014	Indian Television Academy Awards	Most Promising Child Star - Male (Desh Ka Ladla)	Buddha	Nominated	
2014	Indian Telly Awards	Best Child Actor - Male charming	Buddha	Nominated	
