= Pratibha Ranta =

Indian actress (born 2000)

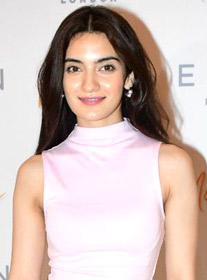
- Ranta in 2024
- Born: 17 December 2000 (age 25); Shimla, Himachal Pradesh, India
- Education: Convent of Jesus and Mary; Usha Gandhi College of Management
- Occupation: Actress
- Years active: 2020–present

Pratibha Ranta (born 17 December 2000) is an Indian actress who works primarily in Hindi films and television. She made her acting debut with the television soap opera Qurbaan Hua (2020–2021) and made her film debut with a leading role in the comedy-drama Laapataa Ladies (2024), which became her breakthrough role and earned her the Filmfare Critics Award for Best Actress.

== Early life ==
Ranta was born on 17 December 2000 in a Pahari Rajput family hailing from Tikkar in Shimla district of Himachal Pradesh. She later shifted to Shimla for her education. She completed her schooling from the Convent of Jesus and Mary, Chelsea, Shimla and graduated in filmmaking from Usha Pravin Gandhi College of Management in Mumbai.

== Career ==
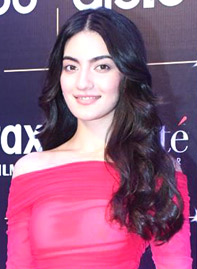
Ranta in 2024

Ranta made her acting debut in 2020 with Qurbaan Hua, where she played Chahat Baig Bhatt Dhyani opposite Karan Jotwani. The series ended in 2021. Following this, she made her web debut with the romantic drama web series Aadha Ishq, where she played Rene Bhardwaj opposite Darsheel Safary and Gaurav Arora. In her review for Times of India, Archika Khurana praised her performance but found her character to be "cliched" and "confusing".

Ranta made her film debut in 2024, with Laapataa Ladies, where she played a swapped bride Jaya / Pushpa. The film was released in India in 2024. Saibal Chatterjee termed her a "show-stealer", while Shubhra Gupta of The Indian Express noted, "The more worldly-wise yet not-as-independent-as-she-would-like-to-be Ranta, who has the more difficult role to pull off, wins the day." Laapataa Ladies earned her several nominations and she won the Filmfare Critics Award for Best Actress and IIFA Award for Star Debut of the Year – Female. In the same year, she played Shama, a courtesan's daughter, in Sanjay Leela Bhansali's series Heeramandi. Bollywood Hungama stated that Ranta doesn't have "much to do".

== Filmography ==
=== Films ===
| Year | Title | Role | Notes | Ref. |
|---|---|---|---|---|
| 2024 | Laapataa Ladies | Jaya Tripathi Singh / Pushpa Rani (Note: Ranta played a single character with two names.) | Debut film | |
| 2026 | Accused | Dr. Meera Mishra | Netflix film | |

=== Television ===
| Year | Title | Role | Notes | Ref. |
|---|---|---|---|---|
| 2020–2021 | Qurbaan Hua | Chahat Baig Bhatt Dhyani | | |
| 2022 | Aadha Ishq | Rene Bhardwaj | | |
| 2024 | Heeramandi | Shama | | |
| 2026 | The Revolutionaries | Pratibha Lahiri | | |

=== Music video appearances ===
| Year | Title | Singer(s) | Ref. |
|---|---|---|---|
| 2024 | "Saccha Wala Pyaar" | Tulsi Kumar, Vishal Mishra | |

== Awards and nominations ==
| Year | Award | Category | Work | Result | Ref |
|---|---|---|---|---|---|
| 2024 | Indian Film Festival of Melbourne | Best Actress | Laapataa Ladies | Nominated | |
| 2025 | International Indian Film Academy Awards | Star Debut of the Year – Female | Laapataa Ladies | Won | |
| 2025 | Zee Cine Awards | Best Female Debut | Laapataa Ladies | Won | |
| 2025 | Filmfare Awards | Best Actress – Critics | Laapataa Ladies | Won | |
| 2025 | Filmfare Awards | Best Female Debut | Laapataa Ladies | Nominated | |
