= Nitanshi Goel =

Indian actress (born 2007)

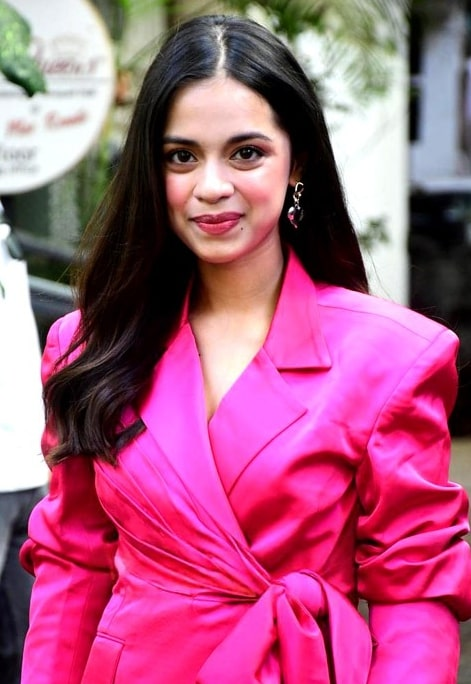
- Goel in 2025
- Born: 12 June 2007 (age 19); Noida, Uttar Pradesh, India
- Occupation: Actress
- Years active: 2012–present

Nitanshi Goel (born 12 June 2007) is an Indian actress who primarily works in Hindi films and television. She is known for her leading role in the comedy-drama film Laapataa Ladies (2024), which won her the IIFA Award for Best Actress and the Filmfare Award for Best Female Debut. She also received nomination for the Filmfare Critics Award for Best Actress.

== Early life ==
Goel was born on 12 June 2007 in Noida, Uttar Pradesh, India. She came to Mumbai with her parents Nitin Goel and Rashi Goel to pursue her career in acting.

== Career ==
Goel began her career as a child model, making appearances in fashion shows and advertisements. In 2015, she won the title of Miss Pantaloons Junior Fashion Icon.

Goel made her Bollywood lead debut in 2024 with the film Laapataa Ladies, produced by Aamir Khan Productions. She received positive reviews and accolades for her performance in the film. Saibal Chatterjee noted, "Nitanshi Goel conveys a combination of fragility and optimism with minimum effort." Eastern Eye featured Goel in their Top 50 Asian stars of 2024. Goel was also seen in the biographical sports drama film Maidaan.

== Filmography ==
=== Films ===
Year	Title	Role	Notes	Ref.
2024	Laapataa Ladies	Phool Kumari		
2024	Maidaan	Seerat		
2027	Hero Ki Horrorine †	TBA	Completed	

=== Television ===
Year	Title	Role	Ref.
2016	Ishqbaaaz	Young Anika	
2016–2017	Naagarjuna – Ek Yoddha	Chutki	
2017	Thapki Pyar Ki	Young Bani Pandey	
2017	Karmaphal Daata Shani	Bhadra	
2017	Peshwa Bajirao	Young Kashibai	
2019	Daayan	Rimpi Bhasin	
2019	Love Sleep Repeat	Young Shailja	
2019	Inside Edge	Young Rohini	

== Awards and nominations ==
Year	Award	Category	Work	Result	Ref
2021	Iconic Gold Awards	Teen Actress of the Year	—	Won	
2024	IMDb	Breakout Star	Laapataa Ladies	Won	
2024	Indian Film Festival of Melbourne	Best Actress	Laapataa Ladies	Nominated	
2025	Iconic Gold Awards	Breakout Star (Female)	Laapataa Ladies	Won	
2025	25th IIFA Awards	Best Actress	Laapataa Ladies	Won	
2025	Zee Cine Awards	Best Female Debut	Laapataa Ladies	Won	
2025	Zee Cine Awards	Best Actor Female – Viewers Choice	Laapataa Ladies	Nominated	
2025	70th Filmfare Awards	Best Female Debut	Laapataa Ladies	Won	
2025	70th Filmfare Awards	Best Actress (Critic)	Laapataa Ladies	Nominated	
