= Gutar Gu =

Indian teen drama television series

- Genre: Teen drama
- Created by: Saqib Pandor
- Screenplay by: Gunjan Saxena and Garima Kunzru
- Directed by: Saqib Pandor
- Starring: Ashlesha Thakur; Vishesh Bansal
- Theme music composer: Gaurav Chatterji
- Country of origin: India
- Original language: Hindi
- No. of seasons: 3
- No. of episodes: 18

Production
- Producers: Achin Jain; Guneet Monga
- Cinematography: Sriram Ganapathy
- Editor: Akshara Prabhakar
- Camera setup: Multi-camera
- Running time: 23–27 minutes
- Production company: Sikhya Entertainment

Original release
- Network: Amazon miniTV
- Release: 4 April 2023 – 17 July 2025

Gutar Gu is an Indian-Hindi language teen drama television series created and directed by Saqib Pandor. Produced by Achin Jain and Guneet Monga under Sikhya Entertainment, it stars Ashlesha Thakur and Vishesh Bansal. The first season premiered on Amazon miniTV on 4 April 2023. The second season premiered on 11 October 2024, followed by the third season on 17 July 2025.

== Plot ==
The drama centers on the developing passion between Anuj and Ritu, two teenagers who manage to maintain their relationship in spite of several social pressures. The story takes place in Bhopal, where a fresh girl named Ritu and Anuj meet in a coaching institution and instantly click. From their first kiss to their first date, each of their numerous firsts has its own special charm. And so it begins. In every episode, Anuj and Ritu's relationship has several highs and lows, yet they always manage to maintain their bond by coming up with easy fixes.

== Cast ==
- Ashlesha Thakur as Ritu
- Vishesh Bansal as Anuj
- Satish Ray as Amit Bhaiya
- Meenal Kapoor as Ritu's Mother
- Harsh Khurana as Ritu's Father
- Shubham Kumar as Umair
- Tushar Shahi as Adi
- Aarrian Sawant as Vineet
- Anjali Israni as Rashi
- Abbhay Joshi as Anuj's Father
- Cindrella D. Cruz as Anuj's Mother
- Sambhavi Sthapak as Sonal
- Gunjan Saini as Pari
- Ajay Pal as Chemistry teacher
- Aditya Vikram as Samrat

== Production ==
The series was announced by Sikhya Entertainment on Amazon Prime Video consisting of six episodes featuring Ashlesha Thakur and Vishesh Bansal. The trailer of the series was released on 31 March 2023.

== Soundtrack ==
Gutar Gu

Soundtrack album by Gaurav Chatterji
- Released: 2023
- Genre: Soundtrack
- Length: 2:00
- Language: Hindi
- Label: Amazon miniTV

Music video
- "Kaise Ab Kahein | Ashlesha Thakur, Vishesh Bansal | Gutar Gu | Amazon miniTV" on YouTube

Gutar Gu is composed by Gaurav Chatterji and lyrics written by Pratik Gangavane. The song "Kaise Ab Kahein" has crossed over 100 million streams on Spotify.

Tracklisting
No.	Title	Lyrics	Music	Singer(s)	Length
1.	"Kaise ab Kahein"	Pratik Gangavane	Gaurav Chatterji	Asa Singh, Hansika Prateek	1:33
Total length:					1:33

== Reception ==
Deepa Gahlot of rediff.com rated the series 3/5 stars. Archika Khurana of The Times of India rated the series 3/5 stars. Sunidhi Prajapat of OTT Play rated the series 3.5/5 stars. Prateek Sur of Outlook India gave it a rating of 4/5 stars.

The series was reviewed by Hari Prasad S for Hindustan Times.
