= Laapataa Ladies =

2023 Indian Hindi comedy drama film

- Theatrical release poster
- Directed by: Kiran Rao
- Screenplay by: Sneha Desai
- Dialogues by: Sneha Desai; Additional Dialogues: Divyanidhi Sharma
- Story by: Biplab Goswami
- Based on: "Two Brides" by Biplab Goswami
- Produced by: Aamir Khan; Kiran Rao; Jyoti Deshpande
- Starring: Sparsh Shrivastava; Nitanshi Goel; Pratibha Ranta; Chhaya Kadam; Ravi Kishan
- Cinematography: Vikash Nowlakha
- Edited by: Jabeen Merchant
- Music by: Ram Sampath
- Production companies: Jio Studios; Aamir Khan Productions; Kindling Pictures
- Distributed by: PVR Inox Pictures (India); Yash Raj Films (International)
- Release dates: 8 September 2023 (TIFF); 1 March 2024
- Running time: 124 minutes
- Country: India
- Language: Hindi
- Budget: est. ₹4–5 crore
- Box office: est. ₹25.26 crore

Laapataa Ladies, released internationally as Lost Ladies, is a 2023 Indian Hindi-language comedy-drama film directed by Kiran Rao, and produced by Rao, Aamir Khan, and Jyoti Deshpande. It stars Sparsh Shrivastava, Nitanshi Goel, Pratibha Ranta, Chhaya Kadam and Ravi Kishan, and tells the story of two young newly-wed brides who get exchanged during a train ride to their husband's homes.

The film was screened at the 48th Toronto International Film Festival on 8 September 2023, and was theatrically released on 1 March 2024. The film received critical acclaim and was praised for its story, screenplay and cast performances.

It won Best Film (Critics' Choice) at the Indian Film Festival of Melbourne. The film was selected as the Indian entry for the Best International Feature Film for the 97th Academy Awards, but was not nominated. The selection of entry raised concerns and controversy over the film instead of All We Imagine as Light. At the 70th Filmfare Awards, Laapataa Ladies received a record-breaking 24 nominations and won 13 awards, including Best Film, Best Director and Best Female Debut (Goel).

== Plot ==
In 2001, within the fictional state of Nirmal Pradesh, a young farmer named Deepak travels back to his village with his new bride, Phool Kumari. They board a heavily congested overnight passenger train alongside several other newlywed couples. Adhering to regional tradition, all the brides wear identical red bridal attire with their faces entirely concealed by a ghoonghat (veil). Deepak dozes off during the journey and wakes up abruptly at night, realizing the train has reached his station. In the ensuing rush and darkness, he accidentally disembarks with the wrong bride, leaving Phool behind on the train with another groom, Pradeep.

Deepak's family gathers to welcome the couple, only to discover the mistake once the bride lifts her veil. Unwilling to reveal her true identity, the woman gives the family a false name, Pushpa, and lies about her hometown. Meanwhile, at a distant railway station, Phool realizes the mix-up. However, because she does not know the name of Deepak's village or his phone number, the station master cannot assist her. Refusing to return to her own village out of fear of bringing social shame upon her family, Phool decides to remain at the platform in hopes that Deepak will return for her. She receives shelter and employment from Manju Mai, an independent woman who runs a tea stall on the platform.

A frantic Deepak files a missing person report with Sub-Inspector Shyam Manohar. Reviewing the details, Manohar grows suspicious of "Pushpa" and surmises she might be a runaway thief. He places her under surveillance, observing her selling jewelry, secretly using a mobile phone, and purchasing bus tickets. Unaware of the police investigation, the woman genuinely bonds with Deepak’s family, while Phool, working at the railway tea stall, learns to make kalakand and adapts to an independent lifestyle.

Believing she belongs to an organized gang, Manohar arrests the woman, discovering her real name is Jaya. Jaya confesses that she possesses an aspiration to study organic farming in Dehradun, but her family forcefully married her off to the abusive Pradeep. She explains that she used the chaotic train mix-up as an unexpected opportunity to escape her marriage.

Pradeep arrives at the police station to reclaim Jaya, immediately slapping her in front of the officers and threatening to extort his dowry from her mother. Manohar intervenes, stating that Jaya is an adult who cannot be legally forced to go with him. He releases Jaya and threatens to prosecute Pradeep for domestic violence and investigate the suspicious death of his first wife if he ever approaches Jaya again.

Before her arrest, Jaya had commissioned Deepak’s artistic sister-in-law, Poonam, to sketch a portrait of Phool, which Jaya printed onto missing person posters and distributed across local transit hubs. Spotting one of these posters at her station, Phool finally identifies her location and reunites with Deepak. Her safety secured, Jaya departs for Dehradun to freely pursue her higher education.

== Cast ==
- Sparsh Shrivastava as Deepak Kumar
- Nitanshi Goel as Phool Kumari, Deepak's wife
- Pratibha Ranta as Jaya Tripathi Singh / Pushpa Rani
- Chhaya Kadam as Manju
- Ravi Kishan as Sub-Inspector Shyam Manohar
- Geeta Agarwal Sharma as Yashoda, Deepak's mother
- Satendra Soni as Chhotu, works at tea stall
- Abeer Jain as Bablu, Deepak's nephew, Poonam's son
- Bhaskar Jha as Pradeep Singh, Jaya's abusive husband
- Daood Hussain as Gunjan, Deepak's friend, Jaya's admirer
- Durgesh Kumar as Constable Dubey
- Pankaj Sharma as Deepak's father
- Kanupriya Rishimum as Constable Bela
- Sanjay Dogra as Murti
- Shad Mohamad as Hanif
- Ravi Kapadiya as Abdul
- Vivek Sawrikar as Station Master
- Rachna Gupta as Poonam, Deepak's sister-in-law, Bablu's mother
- Pranjal Pateriya as Raghu
- Samarth Mayor as Bilas
- Abhay Dubey as Prisoner

== Production ==
This is Kiran Rao's second directorial venture after Dhobi Ghat (2010). The film's co-producer Aamir Khan discovered the story Two Brides, by Biplab Goswami, at a script writing competition in 2018. The film was shot on location in Bamuliya and Dhamankheda (Dhankhedi) villages in the Sehore district of Madhya Pradesh. Local villagers were cast as secondary characters and the film was shot in actual houses in the area.

== Soundtrack ==
The music of the film was composed by Ram Sampath to lyrics written by Divyanidhi Sharma, Prashant Pandey and Swanand Kirkire.

== Release ==
Laapataa Ladies was released in theatres on 1 March 2024. Yash Raj Films acquired global distribution rights for the film.

=== Home media ===
Laapataa Ladies premiered on Netflix on 26 April 2024.

== Reception ==
On the review aggregator website Rotten Tomatoes, 100% of 25 critics' reviews are positive, with an average rating of 7.6/10.

Saibal Chatterjee of NDTV gave the film a rating of 3.5/5 and stated that Kiran Rao returns to the director's seat "with a work that strikes the right notes. She does away with marquee names in Laapataa Ladies... and employs three first-timers in a lively tale of two brides caught in a terrible mix-up."

Bollywood Hungama rated the film 3/5 stars, writing, "Laapataa Ladies works due to the amusing plot, performances, underlying message and some memorable funny and emotional scenes." Catherine Bray of The Guardian gave the film 3 out of 5 stars and stated, "If you can get with the larky premise, Kiran Rao’s tale of mixed-up newlyweds makes for a gently probing comedy of manners."

In a review for The Indian Express, Shubhra Gupta rated the film 3.5 out of 5 stars and wrote, "Kiran Rao's film is unapologetically message-y, but its strongly beating feminist heart overrides the broad brush strokes. Sometimes things need to be stated loud and clear."

Rishil Jogani of Pinkvilla rated the film 4/5 and opined that Laapataa Ladies "is funny, witty, quirky, entertaining and empowering. It is an extremely important film that utilises the power of cinema in the right way".

Tushar Joshi of India Today rated 4/5 and said in his review that "Laapataa Ladies is a terrific watch simply because it is put together so well. The length might be a slight issue, but if you invest your heart into this tale of two women gone missing, then you will be in for a treat."

=== Box office ===
On its first day, the film earned Net of ₹75 lakh, followed by ₹1.45 crore on the second day and ₹1.7 crore on the third day, a first weekend total of ₹3.75 crore. As of 2 May 2024, the film has a gross of ₹24.1 crore in India and a worldwide gross of ₹25.26 crore.

== Controversy ==
=== Plagiarism allegations ===
Since the release of the film, there was a claim by Indian filmmaker Anant Mahadevan that a few scenes in Laapataa Ladies were similar to his 1999 telefilm Ghoonghat Ke Pat Khol. The writer of Laapataa Ladies, Biplab Goswami, refuted these claims and stated that "My story, script, dialogues, characterisation and scenes are all 100 per cent original".

In March 2025, the film drew scrutiny when social media users noticed notable parallels with the 2019 Arabic short film Burqa City, directed by French filmmaker Fabrice Bracq. Both films center around a veiled bride mistakenly swapped and the husband's frantic search. Bracq publicly expressed surprise and concern about the overlaps and similarities, prompting disappointment that Kiran Rao's film had adopted such striking narrative elements.

In response, Laapataa Ladies writer Biplab Goswami strongly refuted the claims, describing them as “completely untrue” and “baseless”. He emphasized that he had registered a detailed synopsis titled Two Brides with the Screenwriters Association on July 3, 2014, containing key scenes (the bride swap revealed by the groom, the police photo scene, and so on) well before Burqa City existed. Plus, the full screenplay was registered in June 2018 and went on to win the runner-up prize at the Cinestaan Storytellers Competition (A Global Search for Indian Scriptwriters) in 2018. After such a strong statement from Biplab Goswami with adequate proof, these allegations died down.

== Accolades ==
Year	Award	Category	Nominee/Work	Result	Ref.
2024	Indian Film Festival of Melbourne	Best Film (Critics' Choice)	Laapataa Ladies	Won	
2024	Indian Film Festival of Melbourne	Best Director (Critics' Choice)	Kiran Rao	Nominated	
2024	Indian Film Festival of Melbourne	Best Actress	Nitanshi Goel	Nominated	
2024	Indian Film Festival of Melbourne	Best Actress	Pratibha Ranta	Nominated	
2024	Indian Film Festival of Melbourne	Best Actor	Sparsh Shrivastav	Nominated	
2025	48th Japan Academy Film Prize	Outstanding Foreign Language Film	Laapataa Ladies	Nominated	
2025	25th IIFA Awards	Best Film	Laapataa Ladies	Won	
2025	25th IIFA Awards	Best Director	Kiran Rao	Won	
2025	25th IIFA Awards	Best Actor	Sparsh Shrivastava	Nominated	
2025	25th IIFA Awards	Best Actress	Nitanshi Goel	Won	
2025	25th IIFA Awards	Best Supporting Actor	Ravi Kishan	Won	
2025	25th IIFA Awards	Best Supporting Actress	Chhaya Kadam	Nominated	
2025	25th IIFA Awards	Star Debut of the Year – Female	Pratibha Ranta	Won	
2025	25th IIFA Awards	Best Music Director	Ram Sampath	Won	
2025	25th IIFA Awards	Best Lyricist	Prashant Pandey for "Sajni"	Won	
2025	25th IIFA Awards	Best Male Playback Singer	Arijit Singh for "Sajni"	Nominated	
2025	25th IIFA Awards	Best Female Playback Singer	Shreya Ghoshal for "Dheeme Dheeme"	Nominated	
2025	25th IIFA Awards	Best Story (Original)	Biplab Goswami	Won	
2025	25th IIFA Awards	Best Screenplay	Sneha Desai	Won	
2025	25th IIFA Awards	Best Editing	Jabeen Merchant	Won	
2025	70th Filmfare Awards	Best Film	Laapataa Ladies	Won	
2025	70th Filmfare Awards	Best Director	Kiran Rao	Won	
2025	70th Filmfare Awards	Best Supporting Actor	Ravi Kishan	Won	
2025	70th Filmfare Awards	Best Supporting Actress	Chhaya Kadam	Won	
2025	70th Filmfare Awards	Best Male Debut	Sparsh Shrivastava	Nominated	
2025	70th Filmfare Awards	Best Female Debut	Nitanshi Goel	Won	
2025	70th Filmfare Awards	Best Female Debut	Pratibha Ranta	Nominated	
2025	70th Filmfare Awards	Critics Best Film	Kiran Rao	Nominated	
2025	70th Filmfare Awards	Critics Best Actor	Sparsh Shrivastava	Nominated	
2025	70th Filmfare Awards	Critics Best Actress	Nitanshi Goel	Nominated	
2025	70th Filmfare Awards	Critics Best Actress	Pratibha Ranta	Won	
2025	70th Filmfare Awards	Best Screenplay	Sneha Desai	Won	
2025	70th Filmfare Awards	Best Dialogue	Sneha Desai	Won	
2025	70th Filmfare Awards	Best Music Director	Ram Sampath	Won	
2025	70th Filmfare Awards	Best Lyricist	Prashant Pandey	Won	
2025	70th Filmfare Awards	Best Lyricist	Swanand Kirkire	Nominated	
2025	70th Filmfare Awards	Best Male Playback Singer	Arijit Singh	Won	
2025	70th Filmfare Awards	Best Female Playback Singer	Shreya Ghoshal	Nominated	
2025	70th Filmfare Awards	Best Editing	Jabeen Merchant	Nominated	
2025	70th Filmfare Awards	Best Art Direction	Vikram Singh	Nominated	
2025	70th Filmfare Awards	Best Cinematography	Vikash Nowlakha	Nominated	
2025	70th Filmfare Awards	Best Sound Design	Ayush Ahuja	Nominated	
2025	70th Filmfare Awards	Best Background Score	Ram Sampath	Won	
2025	70th Filmfare Awards	Best Costume Design	Darshan Jalan	Won	

== See also ==
- List of submissions to the 97th Academy Awards for Best International Feature Film
- List of Indian submissions for the Academy Award for Best International Feature Film
