= Arijit Singh =

Indian singer (born 1987)

- Singh in 2026
- Pronunciation: [ɔɾid͡ʒit̪ ʃiŋɦo]
- Born: 25 April 1987 (age 39); Jiaganj, West Bengal, India
- Education: Sripat Singh College
- Occupations: Singer; composer
- Years active: 2007–present
- Works: Discography
- Spouse: Koel Roy (m. 2014)
- Children: 3
- Awards: Full list
- Honours: Padma Shri (2025)
- Musical career
- Genres: Filmi; Sufi; Pop; Classical
- Labels: Oriyon Music; Zee Music Company; T-Series; Sony Music India; Muslux Studio; YRF Music; Eros Music; Tips; SVF Music; Surinder Films; Saregama

Signature
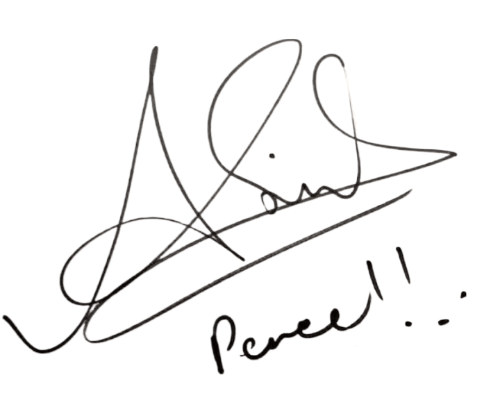

Arijit Singh (Note: Bengali pronunciation: [oɾid͡ʒit̪ ʃiŋɦo]; Punjabi pronunciation: [əɾɪd͡ʒiːt̪(ə̆) sɪ˩˥ŋɡ].) (born 25 April 1987) is an Indian singer and composer. He rose to prominence whilst working as a playback singer, and has been described by critics as one of the most-influential and commercially successful vocalists in Indian music. Singh is noted for his emotive vocal style and work across multiple genres.

Singh began his career in 2005 as a contestant on the reality television programme Fame Gurukul. He worked as a music programmer and assistant to composers including Pritam, Mithoon, Shankar Ehsaan Loy, and Vishal–Shekhar, and made his playback-singing debut in Hindi cinema with "Phir Mohabbat" (2011). He gained wider recognition in 2013 with "Tum Hi Ho" from Aashiqui 2, for which he was awarded a Filmfare Award for Best Male Playback Singer.

He has received two National Film Awards and eight Filmfare Awards. In 2025, he received his eighth Filmfare Award for "Sajni", equalling Kishore Kumar’s record for the most wins in the Best Male Playback Singer category. In 2025, Singh received the Padma Shri, one of India’s highest civilian honours, for his contributions to the arts. During his career, Singh has sung more than 700 songs. Singh has been the most-streamed artist on Spotify in India for seven consecutive years, from 2019 to 2025.

== Early life ==
Arijit Singh was born on 25 April 1987 in Jiaganj, West Bengal, India, to Surinder Kakkar Singh, a Punjabi Sikh, and Aditi Singh, a Bengali Hindu woman. His paternal family migrated from Lahore during the Partition of India. His mother died on 20 May 2021 at the age of 52 due to complications from a cerebral stroke.

Singh was raised in a musically inclined family; his maternal aunt was trained in Indian classical music and his maternal grandmother sang. His maternal uncle and mother, who was also a singer, played the tabla. He attended Raja Bijay Singh High School and later studied at Sripat Singh College, an affiliate of University of Kalyani. According to Singh, he was a "decent student" but was more interested in music, leading his parents to arrange formal training.

He received training in Indian classical music, tabla, Rabindra Sangeet and Western pop music. He began training at the age of three, and at the age of nine received a government scholarship for vocal training in Indian classical music.

Growing up, Singh listened to composers such as Wolfgang Amadeus Mozart and Ludwig van Beethoven, as well as modern Bengali music. He has cited musicians including Bade Ghulam Ali Khan, Ustad Rashid Khan, Zakir Hussain, and Anand Chatterjee as influences, and has also expressed admiration for singers such as Kishore Kumar, Hemant Kumar, and Manna Dey.

== Career ==
=== Early career and breakthrough ===
In the early 2010s, Singh began working in film music, collaborating with Pritam on film soundtracks, including Golmaal 3, Crook, and Action Replayy. He also recorded "Neeve Na Neeve Na" for the Telugu film Kedi, and made his Hindi playback debut with "Phir Mohabbat" from Murder 2. He gained industry recognition with "Raabta" from Agent Vinod (2012), and contributed to the soundtracks of Players, Cocktail, and Barfi!. His breakthrough came with Aashiqui 2 (2013), particularly the song "Tum Hi Ho", which achieved commercial success and earned him the Filmfare Award for Best Male Playback Singer. Singh also worked on the Hindi films Yeh Jawaani Hai Deewani, Chennai Express, Jackpot, and Goliyon Ki Raasleela Ram-Leela. On 10 November 2013, he headlined the "Xpressions" festival at the Xavier Institute in Odisha.

=== 2014–2019: Touring and continued work in film music ===
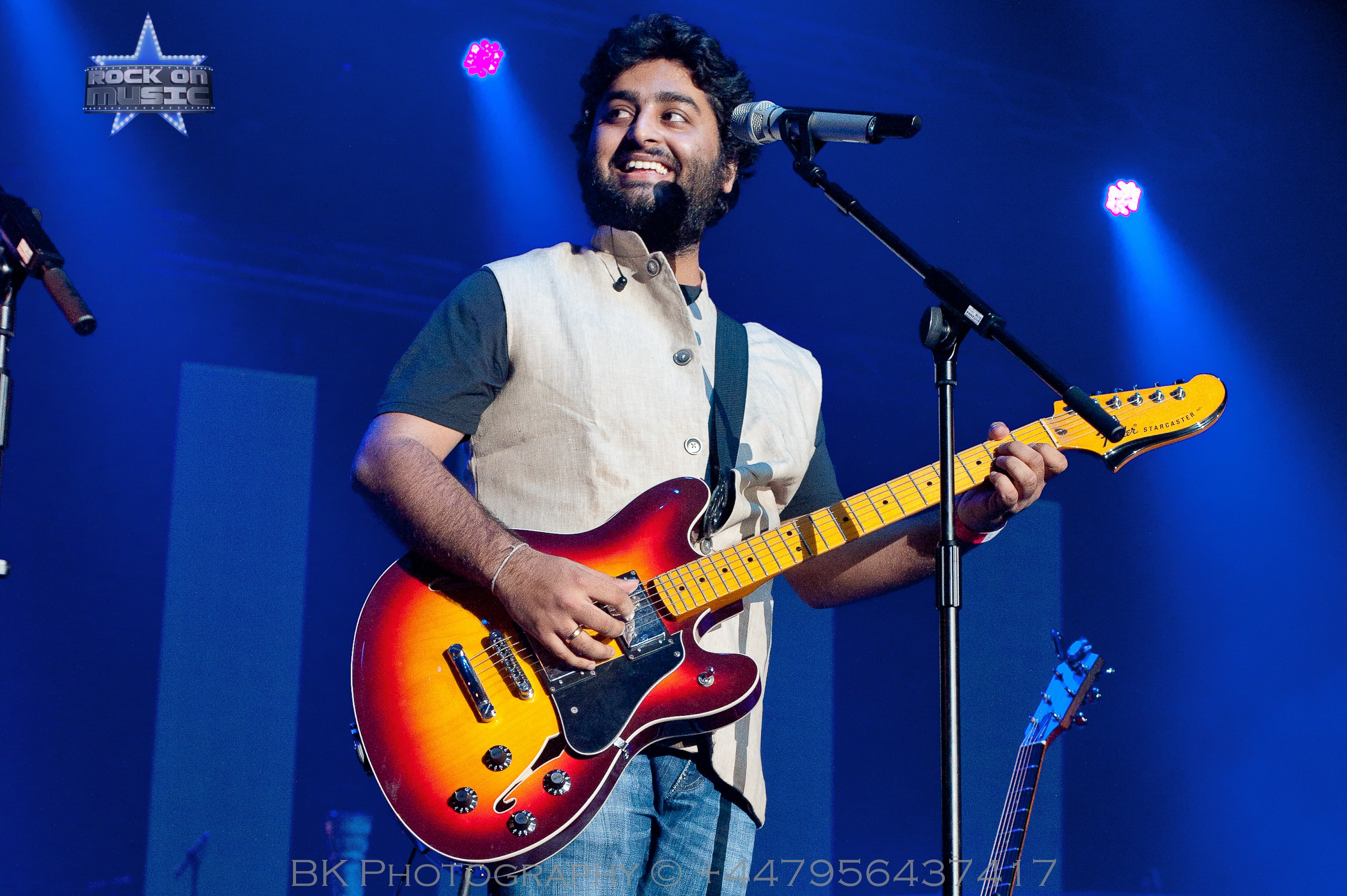
Singh performing live at the Wembley Arena in London, July 2016.

During the mid-2010s, Singh frequently worked with composers Pritam and Vishal–Shekhar. In January 2015, Singh made an international appearance in Dubai accompanied by a 50-piece Grand Symphony Orchestra from London. From 2016, Singh began incorporating symphony orchestras into his live performances. In February 2016, he performed with an orchestra at the Dubai World Trade Centre, and later performed at Rajasthan Day celebrations at the Albert Hall Museum in Jaipur. That year, he also performed in Chandigarh and at AFAS Live in Amsterdam.

In 2017, Singh toured the United States, performing in cities including Dallas, Chicago, Newark, and Washington, D.C.. The tour featured a symphony orchestra. He also worked with MTV and Wizcraft International for the "MTV India Tour" (2017–2018); city venues included Hyderabad, Ahmedabad, and Mumbai.

In 2019, he recorded "Khairiyat" for the film Chhichhore, composed by Pritam with lyrics by Amitabh Bhattacharya; the song achieved commercial success and streaming popularity. In the same year, he recorded "Tujhe Kitna Chahne Lage" for Kabir Singh, which was among the most-commercially successful Hindi film songs of the year. He also collaborated with Shilpa Rao on "Ghungroo" from War, composed by Vishal–Shekhar with lyrics by Kumaar. Also in 2019, Singh toured North America, performing in venues such as the Prudential Center in Newark and the Peacock Theatre in Los Angeles. He also performed at Lusail Sports Arena in Qatar.

=== 2020–present: Independent label and shift away from film music ===
In 2020, Singh recorded songs for films including Love Aaj Kal, Chhapaak, Street Dancer 3D, and Malang. During the COVID-19 pandemic, he also worked on the soundtrack of the series The Forgotten Army – Azaadi Ke Liye. In July 2020, Singh launched his independent music label, Oriyon Music, moving towards non-film music. He later released non-film singles including "Dil Ko Maine Di Kasam", composed by Amaal Mallik, and "Rihaa", his first independent single as singer, composer and producer; a Bengali version titled "Mukto Kore Dao" was also released. He resumed live performances in November 2021 at the Etihad Arena in Abu Dhabi.

In 2022, he recorded "Kesariya" for Brahmāstra: Part One – Shiva, for which he received the Filmfare Award for Best Male Playback Singer at the 68th Filmfare Awards. In 2025, he received his eighth Filmfare Award for "Sajni" from Laapataa Ladies, equalling Kishore Kumar’s record for the most wins in this category. In 2022, Singh began a series of international tours across Europe and Australia. He also performed a tribute to Lata Mangeshkar on the television special 'Naam Reh Jayegaa' in June 2022. In October 2025, he provided uncredited vocals on the song "Sapphire" by Ed Sheeran, which was later included on his album Play.

In January 2026, Singh announced his retirement from playback singing, stating he would no longer accept new assignments, whilst continuing to work in independent and classical music. In October 2026, Singh announced a nine-city India tour for 2027 to celebrate his 20-year career in the music industry.

== Artistry ==
=== Musical style ===
Singh's vocal has been described as baritone, and is noted for his emotive vocal style and tonal quality. Critics have commented on the texture of his voice and its consistency in live performances. He has also been noted for his use of meend in his singing.

As a child, Singh vas vocally trained by the Hazari brothers. He studied Hindustani classical music under Rajendra Prasad Hazari, and Rabindra Sangeet and Western pop music by Birendra Prasad Hazari. His training enabled him to perform in a wide range of vocal registers and musical styles.

Critics have noted Singh's use of techniques such as controlled voice modulation; he is primarily associated with romantic ballads such as "Tum Hi Ho" and "Channa Mereya", but has performed in multiple genres, including dance tracks such as "Nashe Si Chadh Gayi", Punjabi folk-inspired songs including "Samjhawan", and Sufi-influenced compositions such as "Mast Magan". He has also recorded songs in electronic dance music and synth-pop, including "Sooraj Dooba Hain" and "Ghungroo". He has collaborated with composers including A. R. Rahman, Pritam, and Vishal–Shekhar.

=== Musical influences ===
Singh has cited his musical influences, including Hindi film music, ghazal traditions, and contemporary international genres. He has named Kishore Kumar as a formative influence, particularly Kumar's versatility and vocal style. He has also cited Mohit Chauhan and Atif Aslam among contemporary influences. Singh has described playback singer Krishnakumar Kunnath (KK) as a significant influence and has paid tribute to him in performances following his death. Other influences include ghazal artists such as Ghulam Ali, Jagjit Singh, and Mehdi Hassan. He has expressed appreciation for international acts including Coldplay, and has expressed interest in working with artists such as Norah Jones.

=== Industry commentary ===
In the 2020s, Singh commented on structural issues within the music industry, particularly payment practices for singers. In a 2023 interview, he criticised practices the lack of adequate pay for vocalists.

== Personal life ==
In January 2014, Singh married Koel Roy in a private ceremony at Tarapith, West Bengal.

Singh has an interest in sports, particularly badminton and football. He supports the English football club Manchester United, and has identified Sachin Tendulkar, Sourav Ganguly and Saina Nehwal among his favourite sportspersons.

=== Lifestyle and residence ===
Singh is known for maintaining a relatively low public profile despite his commercial success. Indian media have frequently characterised him as a "small-town" artist from Jiaganj who rose to prominence in Hindi cinema.

He mainly resides in Jiaganj, where he is locally known by the nickname "Shomu", and participates in community activities and uses local modes of transport. In February 2025, British singer-songwriter Ed Sheeran visited Singh in Jiaganj, where they were seen travelling through the town together. This was followed in March 2025 by visits from Dutch DJ Martin Garrix and February 2026 by actor Aamir Khan in connection with professional collaborations.

His limited media presence and infrequent television appearances, including a guest appearance on The Kapil Sharma Show in 2016, have been described as reflective of his reserved and private nature. Singh has stated he previously avoided playing his own songs in his personal space to differentiate between his work and private life. He has also stated he engages minimally with social media and prefers audience feedback to be mediated through his team.

=== Philanthropy ===
During the COVID-19 pandemic, he participated in virtual events. In June 2021, he collaborated with Facebook and GiveIndia for a live-streamed relief concert supporting pandemic responses in India, which received significant viewership and raised funds. Singh is involved in philanthropic activities through the Tatwamasi Foundation, focussing on the Murshidabad district, where he has been associated with projects including a multi-specialty hospital, a music academy, and a sports complex.

== Achievements ==
Singh has received numerous awards and honours for his work in Indian playback singing. In 2025, he was conferred the Padma Shri, India's fourth-highest civilian award, by the Government of India for his contributions to the arts.

As of 2026, he has received two National Film Awards; these being for "Binte Dil" (Padmaavat) at the 66th National Film Awards in 2019 and "Kesariya" (Brahmāstra: Part One – Shiva) at the 70th National Film Awards in 2024. Singh has won eight Filmfare Awards, equalling the record set by Kishore Kumar. His wins include five consecutive awards from 2016 to 2020. His eighth award was for "Sajni" (Laapataa Ladies) at the 70th Filmfare Awards in 2025. His first Filmfare Award was for "Tum Hi Ho" in 2014.

He has also been recognised for his live performances, having been awarded the Wizcraft Honour for Best Live Performer and being listed among the top performers at the SSE Arena, Wembley, in the 2016 SSE Live Awards. He has received multiple Mirchi Music Awards, Global Indian Music Academy Awards (GiMA), and Stardust Awards for his work on films such as Ae Dil Hai Mushkil, Roy and Brahmāstra: Part One – Shiva.

In 2025, Singh was awarded the Padma Shri, India's fourth-highest civilian honour, for his contributions to the arts. International publications have noted his global tours, including performances at London's O2 Arena. From 2019 to 2025, he remained the most-streamed artist in India for seven consecutive years. His popularity has extended beyond the music industry, with public figures from other fields expressing admiration for his work. Cricketer Virat Kohli has described himself as a fan of Singh's music and praised his voice.

== See also ==
- List of Indian playback singers
