= 70th Filmfare Awards =

2024 awards for Hindi cinema

- Presented on: 11 October 2025
- Site: EKA Arena, Ahmedabad, Gujarat
- Hosted by: Shah Rukh Khan; Karan Johar; Maniesh Paul
- Organized by: The Times Group
- Official website: Filmfare Awards 2025

Highlights
- Best Film: Laapataa Ladies
- Best Director: Kiran Rao for Laapataa Ladies
- Best Actor: Kartik Aaryan for Chandu Champion; Abhishek Bachchan for I Want to Talk
- Best Actress: Alia Bhatt for Jigra
- Critics Award for Best Film: I Want to Talk
- Most awards: Laapataa Ladies (13)
- Most nominations: Laapataa Ladies (24)

Television coverage
- Network: Zee TV

The 70th Filmfare Awards was presented by The Times Group, which honored the best Indian Hindi-language films of 2024.

Laapataa Ladies led the ceremony with a record 24 nominations, the most for a single film in a year, and won a leading 13 awards including, Best Film and Best Director (for Kiran Rao).

== Ceremony ==
The ceremony, held at EKA Arena, Ahmedabad, Gujarat, honoured the films released in 2024. Shahrukh Khan hosted for the first time since the 63rd Filmfare Awards.

== Winners and nominees ==
The nominations were announced by Filmfare on 26 September 2025.The winners were announced in a ceremony held on 11 October 2025.

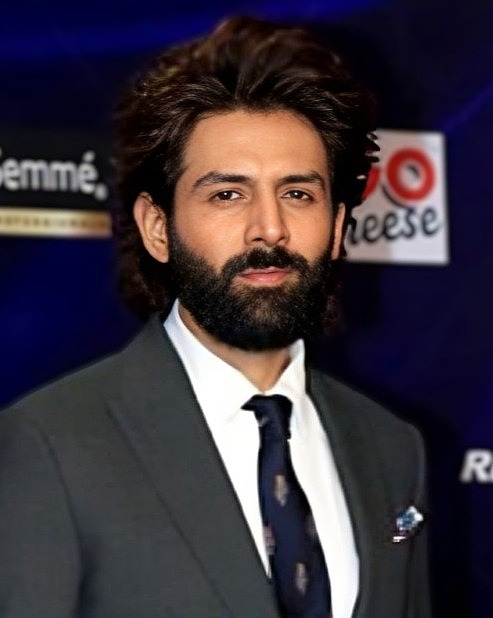
Kartik Aaryan, Best Actor (co-winner)

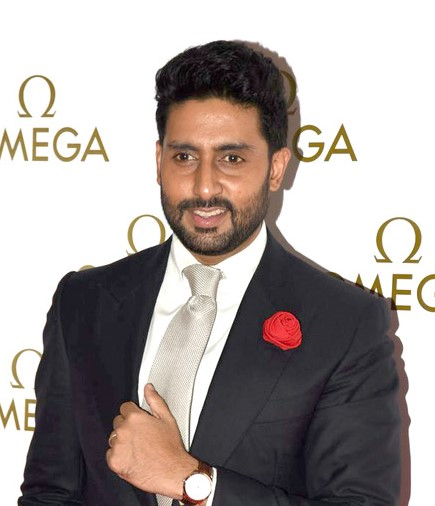
Abhishek Bachchan, Best Actor (co-winner)

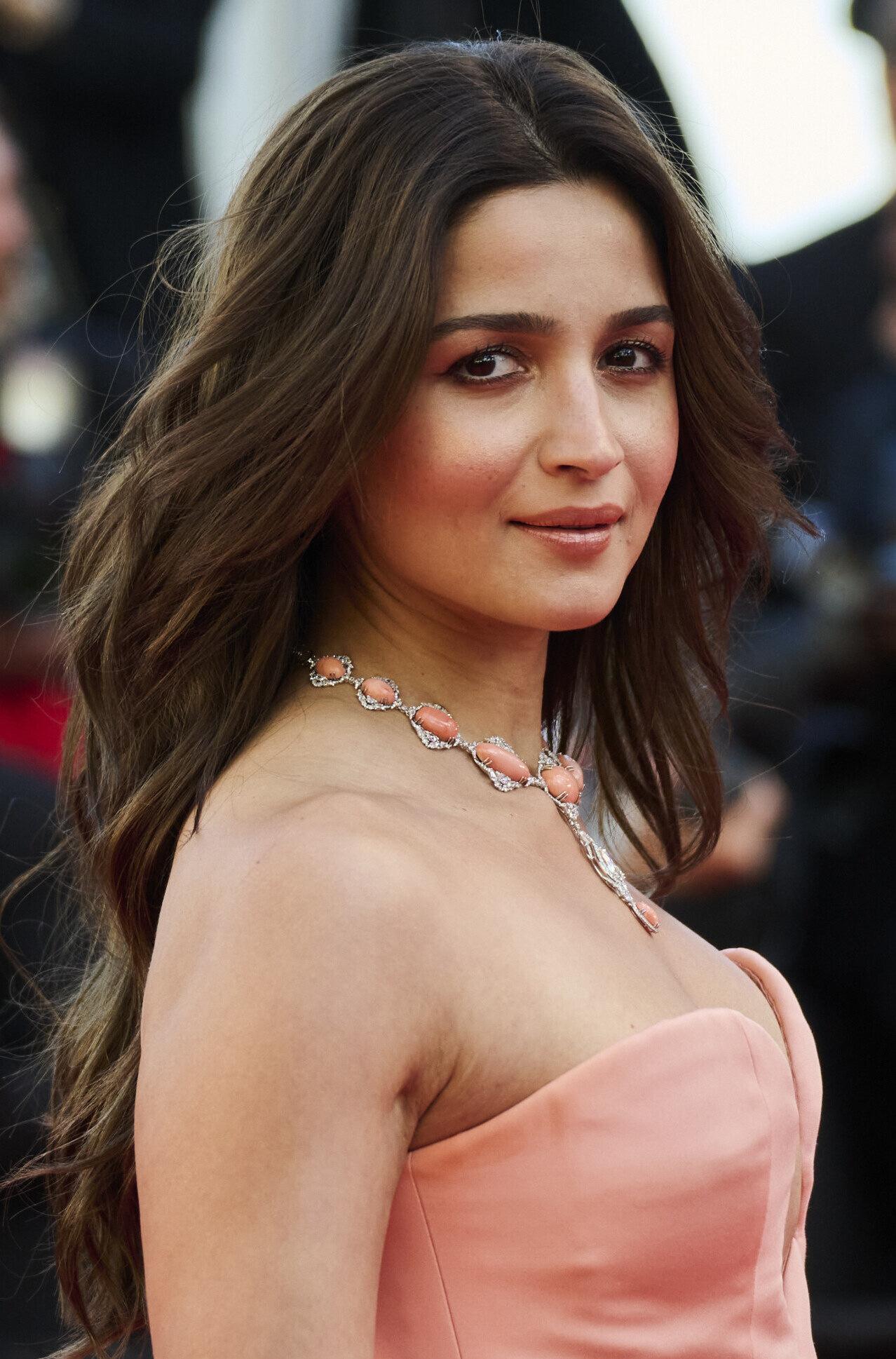
Alia Bhatt, Best Actress

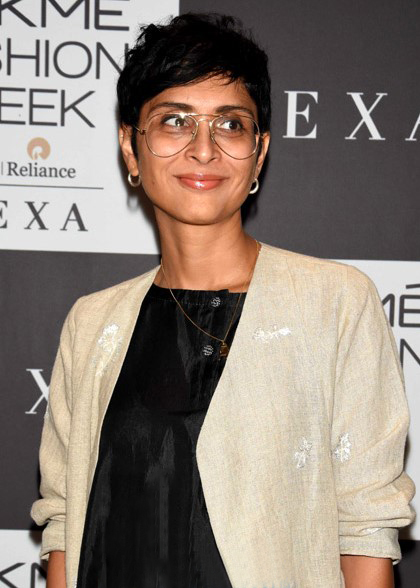
Kiran Rao, Best Director

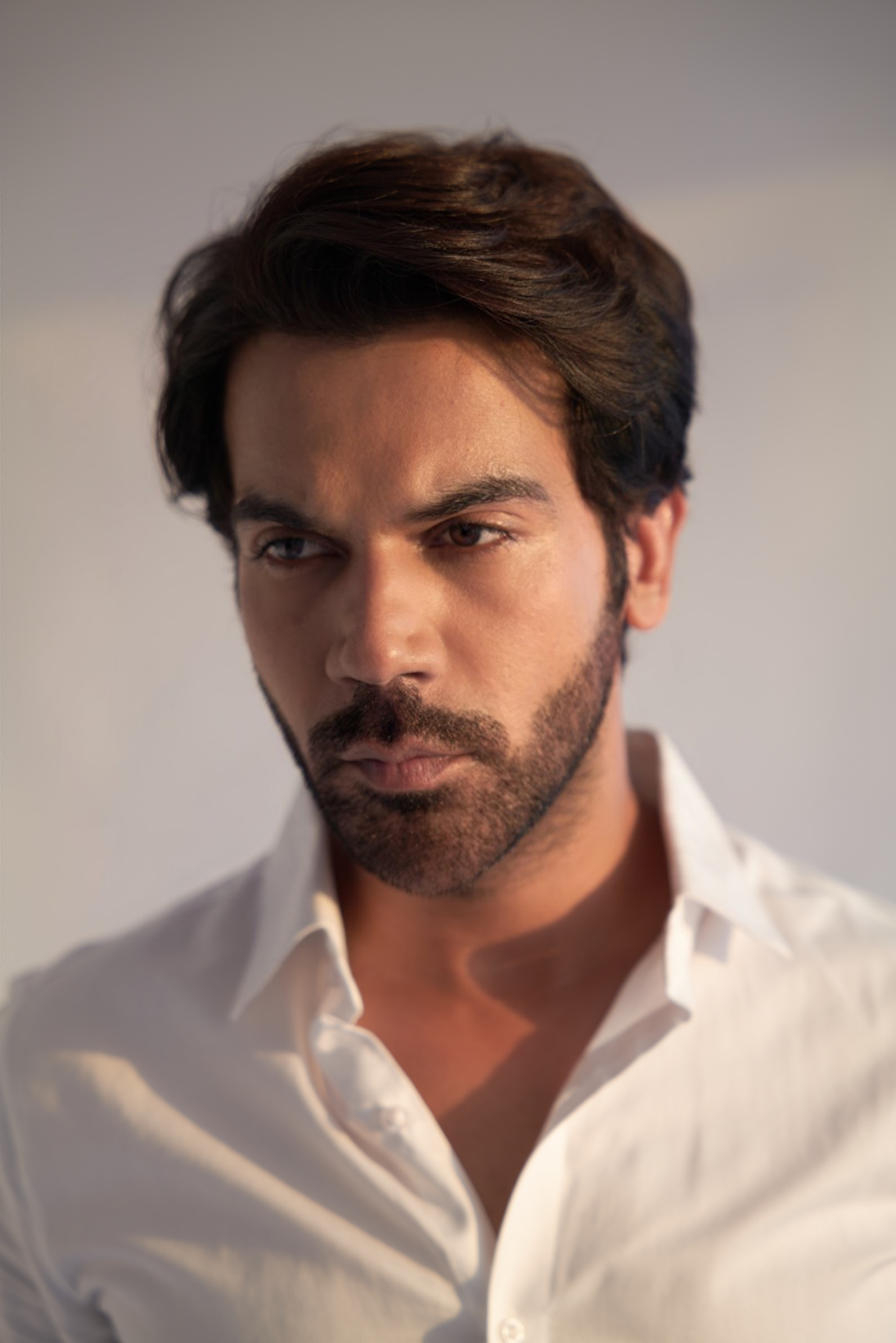
Rajkummar Rao, Best Actor Critics

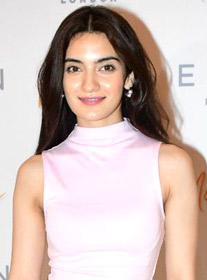
Pratibha Ranta, Best Actress Critics

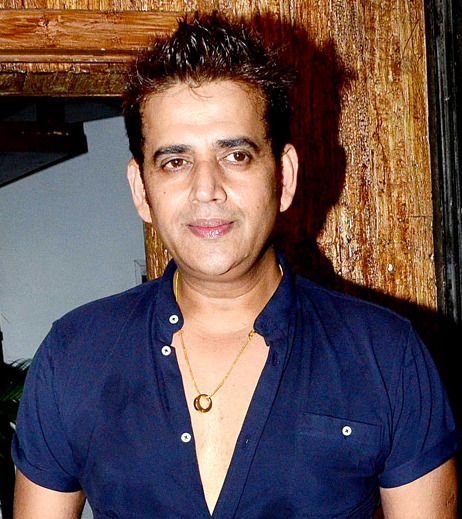
Ravi Kishan, Best Supporting Actor

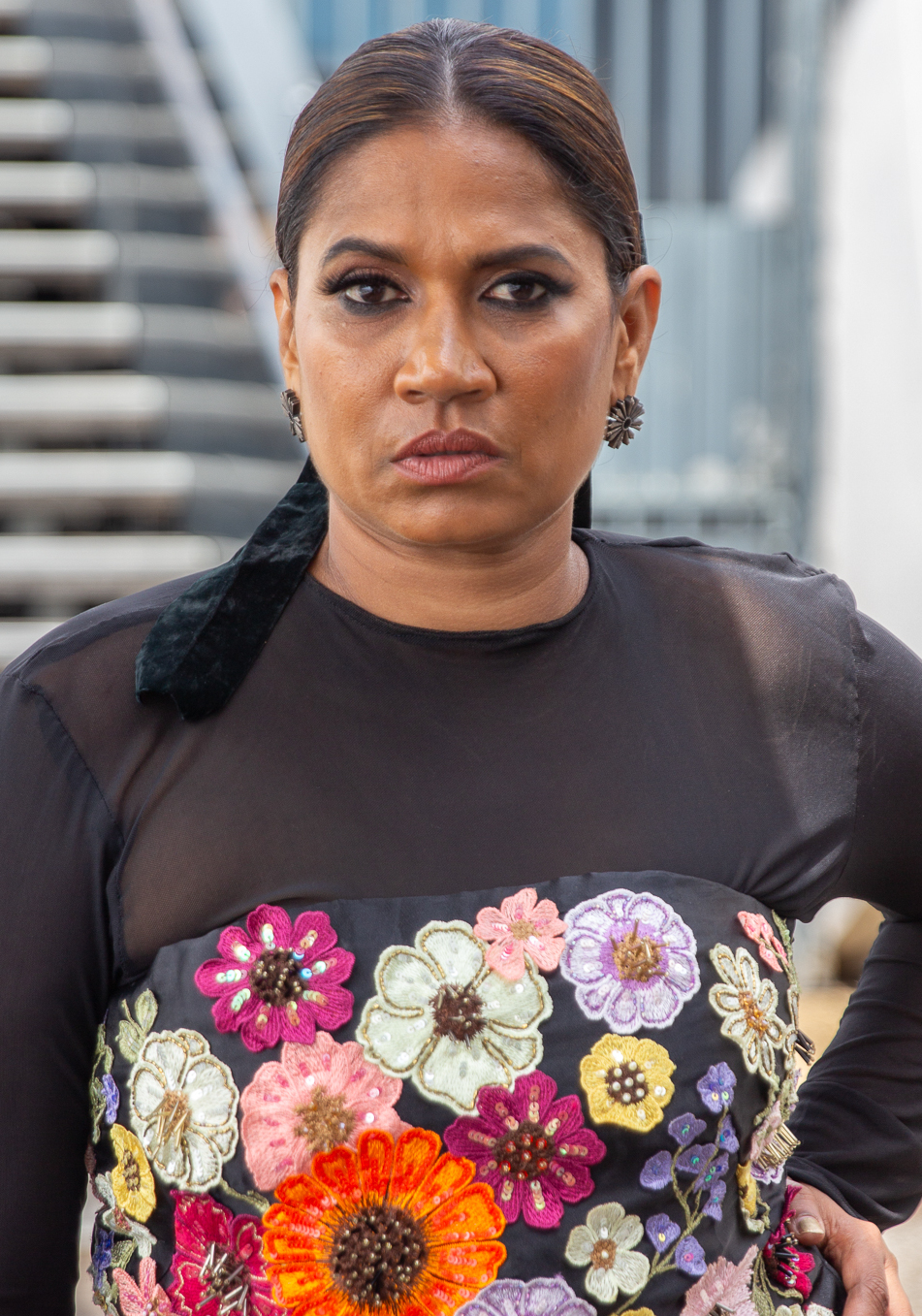
Chhaya Kadam, Best Supporting Actress

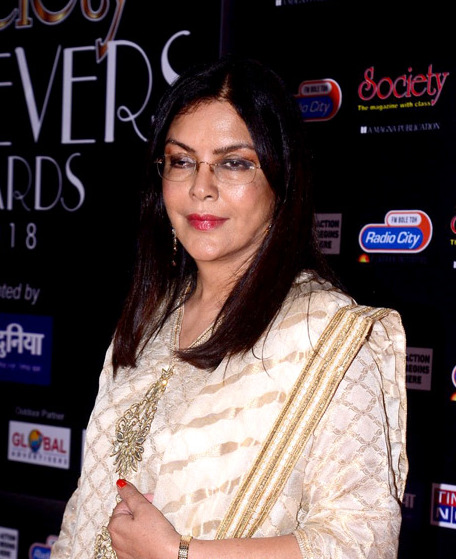
Zeenat Aman, Lifetime Achievement Award (co-winner)

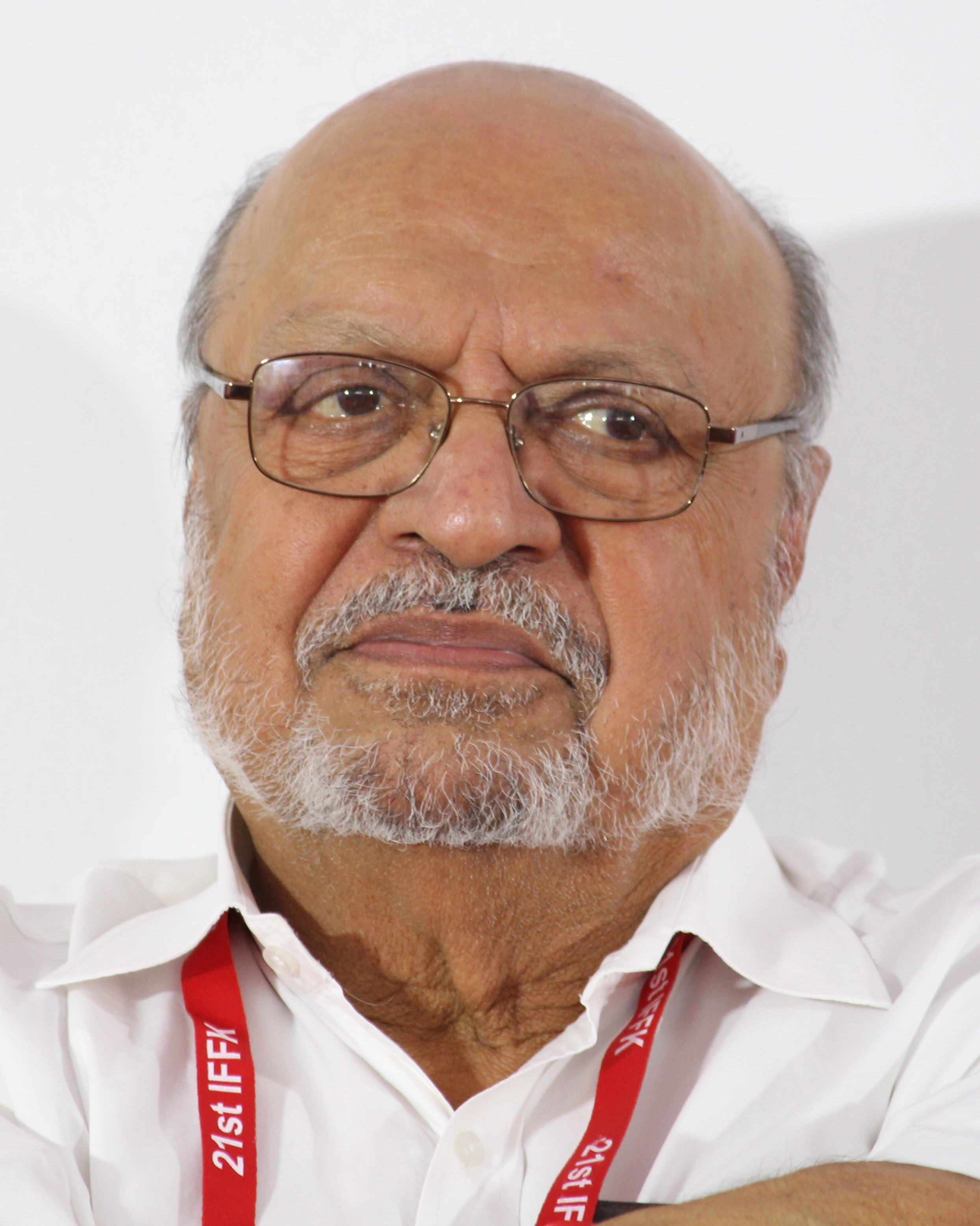
Shyam Benegal, Lifetime Achievement Award (co-winner)

=== Popular awards ===
Best Film		Best Director
Laapataa Ladies – Jio Studios, Aamir Khan Productions, Kindling Pictures; Article 370 – Jio Studios, B62 Studios; Bhool Bhulaiyaa 3 – T-Series Films, Cine1 Studios; Kill – Dharma Productions, Sikhya Entertainment; Stree 2 – Maddock Films, Jio Studios		Kiran Rao – Laapataa Ladies; Aditya Suhas Jambhale – Article 370; Amar Kaushik – Stree 2; Anees Bazmee – Bhool Bhulaiyaa 3; Nikhil Nagesh Bhat – Kill
Best Actor		Best Actress
Kartik Aaryan – Chandu Champion as Murlikant Petkar alias Chandu Champion; Abhishek Bachchan – I Want to Talk as Arjun Sen; Ajay Devgn – Maidaan as Syed Abdul Rahim; Akshay Kumar – Sarfira as Vir Jagannath Mhatre; Hrithik Roshan – Fighter as Shamsher "Patty" Pathania; Rajkummar Rao – Stree 2 as Vicky		Alia Bhatt – Jigra as Satyabhama "Satya" Anand; Kareena Kapoor Khan – Crew as Jasmine Kohli; Kriti Sanon – Teri Baaton Mein Aisa Uljha Jiya as SIFRA; Shraddha Kapoor – Stree 2 as Unnamed phantasm; Tabu – Crew as Geeta 'Geetu' Sethi; Yami Gautam – Article 370 as Zooni Haksar
Best Supporting Actor		Best Supporting Actress
Ravi Kishan – Laapataa Ladies as Inspector Shyam Manohar; Pankaj Tripathi – Stree 2 as Rudra Bhaiya; Paresh Rawal – Sarfira as Paresh Goswami; R. Madhavan – Shaitaan Vanraj Kashyap; Raghav Juyal – Kill as Fani Bhushan		Chhaya Kadam – Laapataa Ladies as Manju; Ahilya Bamroo – I Want to Talk as Reya Sen; Janki Bodiwala – Shaitaan as Jahnvi Rishi; Madhuri Dixit – Bhool Bhulaiyaa 3 as Rajkumari Anjulika and ACP Rathore IPS "Mandira"; Priyamani – Article 370 as Rajeshwari Swaminathan
Debut Awards
Best Male Debut	Best Female Debut	Best Debut Director
Lakshya Lalwani – Kill as Amrit Rathod; Abhinav Singh – Love Sex Aur Dhokha 2 as Shubham Narang/Game Paapi; Kshitij Chauhan - Vedaa as Suyog Pratap Singh; Guru Randhawa – Kuch Khattaa Ho Jaay as Heer; Jibraan Khan – Ishq Vishk Rebound as Sahir Singh Rajput; Sparsh Shrivastava – Laapataa Ladies as Deepak Kumar	Nitanshi Goel – Laapataa Ladies as Phool Kumari; Ahilya Bamroo – I Want to Talk as Reya Sen; Anjini Dhawan – Binny and Family as Bindiya "Binny" Singh; Dhvani Bhanushali - Kahan Shuru Kahan Khatam as Meera; Pratibha Ranta – Laapataa Ladies as Jaya Tripathi Singh / Pushpa Rani; Pashmina Roshan - Ishq Vishk Rebound as Sanya Malhotra	Aditya Suhas Jambhale – Article 370; Kunal Kemmu – Madgaon Express; Amit Joshi and Aradhana Sah – Teri Baaton Mein Aisa Uljha Jiya; Shirsha Guha Thakurta – Do Aur Do Pyaar; Randeep Hooda – Swatantrya Veer Savarkar; Varun Grover – All India Rank
Writing Awards
Best Story		Best Screenplay
Aditya Dhar, Monal Thaakar – Article 370; Aakash Kaushik – Bhool Bhulaiyaa 3; Nikhil Nagesh Bhat – Kill; Niren Bhatt – Stree 2; Dibakar Banerjee, Shubham, Prateek Vats – Love Sex Aur Dhokha 2		Sneha Desai – Laapataa Ladies; Aditya Dhar, Aditya Suhas Jambhale, Arjun Dhawan, Monal Thaakar – Article 370; Niren Bhatt – Stree 2; Nikhil Nagesh Bhat – Kill; Kunal Kemmu – Madgaon Express
Best Dialogue		Best Adapted Screenplay
Sneha Desai – Laapataa Ladies; Niren Bhatt – Stree 2; Ritesh Shah – Maidaan; Ritesh Shah – I Want to Talk; Kunal Kemmu – Madgaon Express		Ritesh Shah, Tushar Sheetal Jain – I Want to Talk; Saiwyn Quadras, Amit Ravindranath Sharma, Aman Rai, Atul Shahi – Maidaan; Sriram Raghavan, Arjit Biswas, Pooja Ladha Surti, Anukriti Pandey – Merry Christmas; Aamil Keeyan Khan – Shaitaan; Jagdeep Sidhu, Sumit Purohit – Sriknath
Music Awards
Best Music Album		Best Lyricist
Laapataa Ladies – Ram Sampath; Bad Newz – Rochak Kohli, Vishal Mishra, DJ Chetas-Lijo George, Prem-Hardeep, Karan Aujla, Abhijeet Srivastava; Bhool Bhulaiyaa 3 – Pritam, Tanishk Bagchi, Amaal Mallik, Sachet–Parampara, Aditya Rikhari, Lijo George–DJ Chetas; Maidaan – A. R. Rahman; Stree 2 – Sachin–Jigar; Teri Baaton Mein Aisa Uljha Jiya – Tanishk Bagchi, Sachin–Jigar, Mitraz		Prashant Pandey – "Sajni" – Laapataa Ladies; Kausar Munir – "Sarphira" – Chandu Champion; Siddhant Kaushal – "Nikat" – Kill; Swanand Kirkire – "Dheeme Dheeme" – Laapataa Ladies; Varun Grover – "Raat Akeli Thi" – Merry Christmas
Best Playback Singer – Male		Best Playback Singer – Female
Arijit Singh – "Sajni" – Laapataa Ladies; Javed Ali – "Mirza" – Maidaan; Karan Aulja – "Tauba Tauba" – Bad Newz; Pawan Singh – "Aayi Nahi" – Stree 2; Sonu Nigam – "Mere Dholna" – Bhool Bhulaiyaa 3		Madhubanti Bagchi – "Aaj Ki Raat" – Stree 2; Anumita Nadesan – "Tenu Sang Rakhna" – Jigra; Rekha Bhardwaj – "Nikat" – Kill; Shilpa Rao – "Ishq Jaisa Kuch – Fighter; Shreya Ghoshal – "Dheeme Dheeme" – Laapataa Ladies

=== Critics' awards ===
Best Film
I Want to Talk – Shoojit Sircar; Laapataa Ladies – Kiran Rao; Maidaan – Amit Ravindernath Sharma; Merry Christmas – Sriram Raghavan; The Buckingham Murders – Hansal Mehta
Best Actor	Best Actress
Rajkummar Rao– Srikanth as Srikanth Bolla; Abhishek Bachchan – I Want to Talk as Arjun Sen; Pratik Gandhi – Madgaon Express as Pratik Garodia "Pinku"; Randeep Hooda – Swatantrya Veer Savarkar as Vinayak Damodar Savarkar; Sparsh Shrivastava – Laapataa Ladies as Deepak kumar	Pratibha Ranta – Laapataa Ladies as Jaya Tripathi Singh / Pushpa Rani; Alia Bhatt – Jigra as Satyabhama "Satya" Anand; Kareena Kapoor Khan – The Buckingham Murders as Jasmeet "Jass" Bhamra; Nitanshi Goel – Laapataa Ladies as Phool Kumari; Vidya Balan – Do Aur Do Pyaar as Kavya Ganeshan

=== Honorary awards ===
Cine Icons of Indian Cinema
For 1950s: Bimal Roy, Meena Kumari, Dilip Kumar; For 1960s: Nutan; For 1970s: Amitabh Bachchan, Jaya Bachchan; For 1980s: Sridevi; For 1990s: Shah Rukh Khan, Kajol, Karan Johar
Filmfare Special Award	Filmfare Lifetime Achievement Award	Filmfare R. D. Burman Award
50 years of Sholay	Zeenat Aman; Shyam Benegal	Achint Thakkar for Jigra

=== Technical awards ===
Nominations for the technical awards were announced on 26 September 2025.

Best Editing	Best Production Design	Best Choreography
Shivkumar V. Panicker – Kill; Hemanti Sarkar – Stree 2; Jabeen Merchant – Laapataa Ladies; Paramita Ghosh – Love Sex Aur Dhokha 2; Dev Rao Jadhav – Maidaan	Mayur Sharma – Kill; Mayur Sharma – Merry Christmas; Rajnish Hedao – Chandu Champion; Tiya Tejpal – Love Sex Aur Dhokha 2; Vikram Singh – Laapataa Ladies	Bosco–Caesar – "Tauba Tauba" – Bad Newz; Bosco–Caesar – "Sher Khul Gaye" – Fighter; Shaik Jani Basha – Teri Baaton Mein Aisa Uljha Jiya – Teri Baaton Mein Aisa Uljha Jiya; Vijay Ganguly – "Aaj Ki Raat" – Stree 2; Chinni Prakash – "Ami Je Tomar" – Bhool Bhulaiyaa 3
Best Cinematography	Best Sound Design	Best Background Score
Rafey Mehmood – Kill; Avik Mukhopadhyay – I Want to Talk; Emma Dalesman – The Buckingham Murders; Tushar Kanti Ray – Maidaan; Vikash Nowlakha – Laapataa Ladies	Subhash Sahoo – Kill; Ayush Ahuja – Laapataa Ladies; Mandar Kulkarni – The Buckingham Murders; Nihar Ranjan Samal – Maidaan; Tanmay Bhattacherjee – Love Sex Aur Dhokha 2	Ram Sampath – Laapataa Ladies; A. R. Rahman – Maidaan; Daniel B. Gerorge – Merry Christmas; Ketan Sodha, Night Song Records – The Buckingham Murders; Ketan Sodha – Kill
Best Costume Design	Best Action	Best Special Effects
Darshan Jalan – Laapataa Ladies; Kriti Kolwanker, Maria Thakaran – Maidaan; Manisha Melwani, Chandini Whabi, Meagan Concessio, Abhilasha Devnani Baweja – Crew; Rohit Chaturvedi – Chandu Champion; Veera Kapoor EE – Article 370	Oh Sea Young and Parvez Shaikh – Kill; Parvez Shaikh, Craig Macrae – Bade Miyan Chote Miyan; R. P. Yadav, Robert Miller – Maidaan; Parvez Shaikh, Oh Sea Young and Sunil Rodrigues – Fighter; Vikram Dahiya – Jigra	Redefine – Munjya; Digital Domain – Stree 2; Lavan and Kushan (Digital Turbo Media) and Ashutosh Pandey (Reflections Pictures) – Kill; Redefine – Teri Baaton Mein Aisa Uljha Jiya; Redefine – Maidaan

== Superlatives ==
Multiple nominations
Nominations	Film
24	Laapataa Ladies
15	Kill
14	Stree 2
13	Maidaan
8	I Want to Talk
8	Article 370
7	Bhool Bhulaiyaa 3
5	The Buckingham Murders
5	Merry Christmas
5	Love Sex Aur Dhokha 2
5	Teri Baaton Mein Aisa Uljha Jiya
4	Jigra
4	Madgaon Express
4	Chandu Champion
4	Fighter
3	Crew
3	Bad Newz
3	Shaitaan
2	Do Aur Do Pyaar
2	Srikanth
2	Ishq Vishk Rebound
2	Sarfira
2	Swatantrya Veer Savarkar

Multiple wins
Awards	Film
13	Laapataa Ladies
6	Kill
3	I Want to Talk
2	Jigra
2	Article 370

== See also ==
- Filmfare Awards
- List of Hindi films of 2024
