= Love Sex Aur Dhokha 2 =

2024 Indian anthology drama film

- Official film poster
- Directed by: Dibakar Banerjee
- Written by: Dibakar Banerjee; Shubham; Prateek Vats
- Produced by: Shobha Kapoor; Ekta Kapoor
- Starring: Paritosh Tiwari; Bonita Rajpurohit; Abhinav Singh; Swaroopa Ghosh
- Cinematography: Anand Bansal; Riju Das; Priyashanker Ghosh
- Edited by: Paramita Ghosh
- Music by: Tony Kakkar; Meet Bros; Sneha Khanwalkar; Anjjan Bhattacharya
- Production companies: Balaji Motion Pictures; Cult Movies; Dibakar Banerjee Productions
- Release date: 19 April 2024 (India)
- Running time: 116 minutes
- Country: India
- Language: Hindi
- Box office: ₹0.50 crore

Love Sex Aur Dhokha 2 (LSD 2) is a 2024 Hindi-language anthology drama film written by Dibakar Banerjee, Shubham, Prateek Vats, and directed by Dibakar Banerjee. The film features Paritosh Tiwari, Bonita Rajpurohit, Abhinav Singh, and Swaroopa Ghosh in the lead roles. It is a sequel to the 2010 film of the same name. the final installment of a duology. Its narrative is a blend of found footage and screenlife format.

The film was produced by Shobha Kapoor and Ekta Kapoor under the banner of Balaji Motion Pictures. It was released in theatres on 19 April 2024 and became a box office bomb.

== Plot ==
=== LOVE ===
The story follows Noor, a trans-woman competing in a reality show called 'Truth Ya Naach (Truth or Dance)', where the contestants either dance or reveal a truth about themselves (following the rules of Truth or Dare), along with living in a house together 24/7 (parodied from the show Big Brother), where the contestants have the privilege to go off-cam and on-cam anytime they want. The show's contestants are calibrated with a scale called Algoji (Mr. Algorithm), which measures their popularity amongst the audience of India across different themes of family, friendship, and romance revolving around the contestant. The show is hosted by Soni, along with three judges on the panel.

Noor is a popular contestant on the show. In its recap, after being asked Truth or Dance, Noor chooses Truth and reveals her wish to perform her next dance in front of her mother, as she has not seen her in two years. The audiences love her confession and she is safe from elimination. In the following episode, Noor's Mother arrives by a helicopter to participate in the show. Noor and show host Soni go to the Helipad to receive her. After hugging her daughter, Soni asks the mother what does she think of Noor, she answers her by deliberately using incorrect pronouns to address Noor by telling her 'He's lost weight.' In the car, Soni requests Noor's mother to sing in front of 30 million online watchers.

Later, Soni is frustrated because Noor has been off-cam for seven hours, meaning she has chosen to not be in front of the cameras, and is staying in the off-cam tent run by her friend Yashika. When asked, Noor answers that she's uncomfortable with being on the show with her mother. Instead, she wants a romance track with her dance partner Prakash, but Yashika reveals he is practicing abstinence and should stick with her mother's reunion track. The next day, Noor discusses surgery costs with her doctor for a vaginoplasty. But her mother expresses disdain towards it and they have an argument over Noor's decision to be a woman. Some days after, Noor finally comes on-cam at the contestant house. After a fight with Prakash about not kissing her on-cam, she openly challenges the show producers that if Prakash doesn't kiss her on-cam, she won't be his dance partner anymore and will quit the show.

On the stage, she is criticised by the judges for belittling the show, but Noor reveals her dream of wearing a saree and accepting the National Award for Best Actress from the President alongside her mother. This makes her popularity increase and she is applauded, followed by Prakash rushing on to the stage and kissing her.

At the contestants’ house, on-cam, Noor and her mother discuss her past, along with other contestants around. Aasifa, the most popular contestant of the show, then ignites a fight with Noor which escalates when Noor vulgarly gyrates and makes innuendos. Monica, the show's producer, has a discussion with their sponsor's middleman, who says that Noor's actions did not line up with the sponsor, as they are a traditional family brand, and requests to evict Noor without them being directly blamed for it.

Soni brings in a person into the contestant house, who is revealed to be someone who Noor allegedly sexually assaulted when she was a man. During off-cam, Noor and her mother have another argument where her mother blames Noor for her father's death. Angry, Noor hurls a dish at her. After Yashika says that all the best moments like these are off-cam, they practice this same argument off-cam several times, with the on-cam final cut being the mother blaming her for her father's death, and then Noor slapping her.

This hurts Noor's popularity scale and on the stage she apologises for her actions and requests her mother to sing on the stage while Noor and Prakash dance. But one of the judges soon lashes out at Noor for slapping her mother and causes a fight amongst the panel, causing another judge to leave the show. In another call, Monica reveals that the episode did not garner much attention because of a death of a 12-year-old boy covering the national news. Noor is evicted from the show along with her mother. A reporter interviews them as they go to the airport. Before they finally leave, the reporter asks Noor's mother to sing one last time.

=== SEX ===
Kullu Vishwakarma, a trans-woman who works as a toilet cleaner under a scheme in a private metro station, is found unconscious and brutally assaulted in bushes. She wakes up in the hospital, as her boss Lovina Singh demands the police officer to register a case of sexual assault rather than just assault against Kullu. Outside the hospital, a reporter asks Lovina about a housing crisis regarding eight metro employees who had been fired. During an online meeting with officials, Lovina reveals that the eight employees had a contract with Accuro, a company that supplies workers, and that Lovina's company has no hand in their unemployment. Lovina and her colleague Pushpesh, are revealed to have an affair. Pushpesh advises her to think professionally rather than emotionally.

Only after a few days of assault, Kullu returns to work, not being able to afford rest leave. Kullu has a boyfriend named Ajmal, and they both run a vlog called “Pyaar ke Panchchi” (Love Birdies).

During an interrogation, a security camera reveals Kullu waiting at the station after her shift, changing her clothes, and leaving with a man, suspecting Kullu is a sex worker. In a Police press conference, the Police reveal the DNA report that found five different semen samples from Kullu's body, whereas Kullu had said that only man was involved in the assault in her statement to the police.

At the office, Kullu, Lovina, and her assistant Kiran, have a discussion where it is proposed that Kullu take a week off. But out of fear her salary being deducted for the leave, she doesn't want to leave. Instead, she asks Lovina to take the case back.

Kiran tries to persuade Kullu to not do anything untoward regarding the case. Lovina is called to her son's school to take him home as a 12-year-old student is found dead, the same news referred by Monica in the previous story. Kiran calls Lovina and tells that Kullu is finally changing her statement at the police station according to Lovina's request – that five men sexually assaulted her.

The next day, Ajmal is arrested by the police, and Kullu is thrown out of her apartment. As protest, Kullu sits on the metro station platform and refuses to budge until she talks with Lovina, and threatens to go to the press if she doesn't get to talk to her. Kullu reveals that the job alone doesn't pay her bills and has sex with men from the metro station for money. Afraid of the chaos and media drama that will follow after Kullu spreads this news, Lovina gets Ajmal assaulted brutally as soon as he is released from jail, with help from Pushpesh.

Kullu gets angry starts ripping out wires and damaging equipment, which is caught on security camera. Seeing this as a good cover reason, Lovina fires Kullu. On another meeting, Lovina lists out other legal reasons that had Kullu's employment terminated. Not long after, she talks about the forthcoming inauguration of the first woman's coach at the metro that will be happening on Women's Day.

=== DHOKHA ===
GamePaapi/Shubham Narang, an 18-year-old obnoxious famous game-vlogger on YouTube, is showered with gifts by an unknown user called 'fullmoon' during his livestreams. During a gameplay livestream, fullmoon reveals AI-produced images of Shubham having sex with a man in the back of a car. This ruins Shubham's personal life, while his popularity goes off the charts. He is made fun of by his classmates, has his sexuality misappropriated, while losing his mind trying to figure out who fullmoon is, who has no trace of identity except an ominous website of his name. During a party, he is offered a Metaverse sponsorship on the account of his LGBTQ+ identity.

After a 12-year-old student (the same student from the previous two stories) at his school is found dead, he is questioned as he previously bullied students when they mocked him with the phrase “This isn’t me”, a phrase he uttered repeatedly when he saw the AI images. During the questioning, the investigator asks about Shubham being gay, but his father denies it all, along with Shubham. Fueled with anger, the father destroys Shubham's green-screen and background setup.

Slowly spiraling, Shubham keeps staring at fullmoon's website, and gets completely naked. The site hints him to wear his VR headset, which shows an AI-produced video of Shubham and his classmates bullying the 12-year-old boy in the toilet. Scared of the possibility that fullmoon might use this to threaten him, he runs through his home, in a nervous breakdown, completely naked, and hides under the table of his father's tuition classroom. A series of AI-made deformed photos of his real life friends and family runs through the VR.

Some days later, a news headline reveals that Shubham has gone missing after his breakdown, and can only be approached through Metaverse - a virtual world in which users represented by avatars interact in an online space. The news anchor sets up a meeting with the Metaverse version of Shubham, which can only be accessed through VR. The anchor wears the headset and is transported to a 3D-animated world where she finally meets Shubham's avatar, now called ‘Lovetrigga’.

The Metaverse is a world, with green areas and clear blue waterfalls. Shubham lives a life based on ways and runs the "Meta-Purity Spa." In that place he teaches avatars to love themselves and discover happiness inside.

== Cast ==
- Paritosh Tiwari as Noor
- Bonita Rajpurohit as Kullu Vishwakarma
- Abhinav Singh as Shubham Narang/Game Paapi
- Swastika Mukherjee as Lovina Singh
- Mouni Roy as TV anchor Soni
- Uorfi Javed as Chikni Choopdi
- Swaroopa Ghosh as Noor's mother
- Piyush Kumar as Ajmal
- Rahul Raj C as Prakash
- Tanvika Parlikar as Yashika
- Sachin Modakwar as Shivi
- Jayashree Venketaramanan as Asifa
- Pavneet Singh as Sandy
- Sarun Nair as Shravan
- Ankit Lohra as Neetu Kamaniyawala
- Anjali Gaharana as Female contestants
- Akshita Tiwari as Female contestants
- Yash Malhotra as Male contestants
- Anshul Gupta as Male contestants
- Tejas Arora as Nimish
- Shivani Dubey as Kiran
- Muzaffar Khan as Investigating officer
- Bella Sharma as Roshini
- Kanchan Chandrakant Gawand as Rani
- Shaurya Shanker as Martin
- Raajeshwari Arora as Gamepaapi's mother
- Vijay Kumar Dogra as Gamepaapi's father
- Ektara Maheshwari as Noor's Surgeon
- Subhra Sourav Das as Maddy
- Anusha Sharma as Kanika
- Hardeep Gupta as Principal
- Anuprabha Das Mazumder as Woman cop
- Khushie Parghi as Amanpreet
- Arshi Ghosh as Meow Meow girl
- Sarthak Sharma as Rohan Rawat
- Gurleen Kaur as News anchor
- Michael Naidu as Gamepaapi's friend, Selfie
- Surekha Patil as Metaverse old lady
- Rajendra Mohite as Superfan uncle
- Sophie Choudry as Herself - Cameo
- Tusshar Kapoor as Himself - Cameo
- Anu Malik as Himself - Cameo
- Javed Sheikh is an Indian History and producer who appears in History.

== Release ==
Love Sex Aur Dhokha 2 was theatrically released on 19 April 2024.

== Reception ==
Dhaval Roy of The Times of India rated the film 2.5 stars out of 5 stars and noted "LSD 2 remains a visually captivating and well-acted exploration of the dark side of our digital lives. The technically proficient film struggles to deliver a cohesive narrative as compelling as its predecessor."

Bollywood Hungama critic rated the film 1.5 stars out of 5 and wrote, "Love Sex Aur Dhokha 2 fails to make an impact as it's too confusing."

Sukanya Verma of Rediff.com rated 3/5 stars and notes "There is startling accuracy to Dibakar Banerjee's portrayal."

Shilajit Mitra of The Hindu noted " You can sense Banerjee channelling all these disparate frustrations in LSD 2, which is disdainful of corporates and algorithms, the soothing call of Big Brother and the animated bleating of electric sheep."

Prannay Pathak of Hindustan Times noted "The formal chaos and the self-reflexivity of the plot and its treatment might suggest it is more suited to the self-guided OTT experience, but perhaps that’s not the point of LSD 2."

Saibal Chatterjee of NDTV rated the film 3 stars out of 5 stars and noted "If that is the kind of cinema that excites you, LSD 2 might be well worth your time." Shubhra Gupta of The Indian Express rated the film 3.5 stars out of 5 stars and noted "‘Love Sex Aur Dhokha 2’ is a scream of rage, mixed with a confounded befuddlement. It's been a while since I’ve seen an Indian film as politically and socially trenchant as this one."

== Accolades ==
Year	Award	Category	Nominee/Work	Result	Ref.
2025	70th Filmfare Awards	Best Male Debut	Abhinav Singh	Nominated	
2025	70th Filmfare Awards	Best Art Direction	Tiya Tejpal	Nominated	
2025	70th Filmfare Awards	Best Story	Dibakar Banerjee, Shubham, Prateek Vats	Nominated	
2025	70th Filmfare Awards	Best Editing	Paramita Ghosh	Nominated	
2025	70th Filmfare Awards	Sound Design	Tanmay Bhattacherjee	Nominated	
