= Shivkumar V. Panicker =

Indian film editor

- Occupation: Film editor
- Years active: 2016–present

Shivkumar V. Panicker is an Indian film editor who works in Hindi films. He has edited films such as Kapoor & Sons (2016), Uri: The Surgical Strike (2019), Kill (2023), Dhurandhar (2025), and Dhurandhar: The Revenge (2026). He is known for his collaborations with Aditya Dhar.

== Filmography ==
Year	Title	Notes
2016	Kapoor & Sons	
2016	Budhia Singh – Born to Run	
2017	Chef	
2017	Tumhari Sulu	
2019	Uri: The Surgical Strike	Filmfare Award for Best Editing
2020	High	Web series
2022	Jalsa	
2022	Shamshera	
2023	Apurva	
2024	Article 370	
2024	Yodha	
2024	Kill	Filmfare Award for Best Editing
2025	Dhoom Dhaam	
2025	Balti	Bilingual film
2025	Baramulla	
2025	Dhurandhar	
2026	Daldal	Television series
2026	Dhurandhar: The Revenge	
2026	Subedaar	

=== Other crew positions ===
Year	Title	Role
2025	Dhurandhar	Additional screenwriter
2026	Dhurandhar: The Revenge	Additional screenwriter

== Accolades ==
Year	Award	Category	Film	Result	Ref
2020	65th Filmfare Awards	Best Editing	Uri: The Surgical Strike	Won	
2023	8th FOI Online Awards	Best Editing	Jalsa	Nominated	
2025	70th Filmfare Awards	Best Editing	Kill	Won	
2025	10th FOI Online Awards	Best Editing	Kill	Nominated	
2025	Critics' Film Choice Awards	Best Editing	Kill	Won	
2026	Screen Awards	Best Editing	Dhurandhar	Won	
