= Stree 2 (soundtrack) =

- Soundtrack album cover

Soundtrack album by Sachin–Jigar
- Released: 10 August 2024
- Studio: White Noise Collectives
- Genre: Feature film soundtrack
- Length: 14:40
- Language: Hindi
- Label: Saregama
- Producers: Sachin–Jigar, Abhishek Singh

Sachin–Jigar chronology
Munjya (2024)	Stree 2 (2024)	Vicky Vidya Ka Woh Wala Video (2024)
External audio
- Audio Jukebox on YouTube

Stree 2 is the soundtrack album to the 2024 comedy horror film of the same name directed by Amar Kaushik and produced by Dinesh Vijan under his Maddock Films banner. A sequel to Stree (2018) and the fifth instalment in the Maddock Supernatural Universe, the film stars Rajkummar Rao, Shraddha Kapoor, Pankaj Tripathi, Abhishek Banerjee and Aparshakti Khurana, reprising their roles from the previous films. Sachin–Jigar scored the four-song soundtrack with lyrics written by Amitabh Bhattacharya. The album was released under the Saregama label on 10 August 2024.

== Background ==
Sachin–Jigar who previously scored music for Stree returned for the sequel, with Amitabh Bhattacharya serving as lyricist and replacing Vayu from the original, and vocals performed by Madhubanti Bagchi, Divya Kumar, Vishal Mishra, Shilpa Rao, Pawan Singh, Varun Jain and Simran Choudhary. At the film's trailer launch event on 17 July 2024, they revealed that like the predecessor, the album for Stree 2 would feature a diverse set of songs, including two romantic numbers, an all-boys dance number, and an item number, which was designed to appeal all sections of audience, like the soundtrack for the first film.

Since the sequel continues from the events of the first film, Kaushik and Vijan wanted to maintain the flavor of the same as both films are set in a universe. They refrained from using the songs from the first film, to match with the aim of creating new songs and surprise the audiences.

== Development and production ==
Sachin and Jigar met Bhattacharya and Vijan at a dinner and discussed the songs required for certain scenes; Jigar jammed on a tune and beat after being requested for a specific number. Sachin then spoke to Bhattacharya on composing a song for Tamannaah Bhatia's character Shama ("Aaj Ki Raat") as she could sing an Urdu song from the place of Chanderi. With the aforementioned beat, the duo tuned a ghazal-type tune which was reminiscent of Ghulam Ali's compositions but also provided modern arrangements and chromatics so that they could "create something desi-cool or desi-modern" and more palatable to the listener.

The duo further roped in regional singers, as "they bring a breath of fresh air" in contrast with the familiar voices heard in Hindi film music. Bagchi was roped in to perform vocals for "Aaj Ki Raat"; the duo admitted that they repeatedly tried to fit her in most of the Hindi songs he had composed, and with "Aaj Ki Raat" it "clicked perfectly". They recalled that "it was a combination of her voice, her performance, our luck, and everything else".

Pawan Singh co-performed vocals for the song "Aayi Nai" in what was a last-minute call, according to the duo. The song, which they described as "very desi" initially had Divya Kumar provide vocals for the song as he had a rooted nature. After the recording, however, they realized the song needed a different type of voice to resonate well amongst audiences. A member from the music team recommended Singh's name, and he recorded its vocals on 30 July 2024, a day before the song was set to be released; it marked Singh's debut Hindi song. The duo further applauded Vijan's creative freedom on supporting local artists.

The duo recalled that "Khoobsurat" was the toughest song to be composed, as while the song had an indigenous melody, he wanted to make it Western without losing the flavor of it.

== Marketing and release ==
Stree 2's soundtrack featured four songs; all of them were released as singles. The first single "Aaj Ki Raat" was released on 24 July 2024. The second song "Aayi Nai" was released on 31 July. The romantic number "Tumhare Hi Rahenge Hum" was released as the third single on 6 August. The final single "Khoobsurat" was released on 9 August, along with the complete soundtrack which was released under the Saregama label.

== Track listing ==
Track listing
No.	Title	Singer(s)	Length
1.	"Aaj Ki Raat"	Madhubanti Bagchi, Divya Kumar, Sachin–Jigar	3:48
2.	"Khoobsurat"	Vishal Mishra, Sachin–Jigar	4:04
3.	"Aayi Nai"	Pawan Singh, Divya Kumar, Simran Choudhary, Sachin–Jigar	2:58
4.	"Tumhare Hi Rahenge Hum"	Varun Jain, Shilpa Rao, Sachin–Jigar	3:50
Total length:			14:40

== Reception ==
Anish Mohanty of Planet Bollywood summarized "Sachin-Jigar deliver yet another winner of a soundtrack for Maddock Films." Joginder Tuteja of Bollywood Hungama wrote "The soundtrack of Stree 2 works quite well in totality. With a couple of dance numbers and a couple of love songs, it's a short and sweet album which leaves a good impression." Rishabh Suri of Hindustan Times praised the music as it worked in favor of the film. However, Dishya Sharma of News18 criticized the songs, saying that "The songs, unfortunately, don't match up to those from the first Stree film; none have left a lasting impression."

== Personnel ==
- Sachin–Jigar – composer (all tracks), producer (all tracks), musical arrangements (all tracks), design (all tracks)
- Abhishek Singh – producer (all tracks), musical arrangements (all tracks), design (all tracks), programming (track: 2), backing vocalist (track: 3),
- Sahil Vishwakarma – programming (tracks: 2, 3, 4), backing vocalist (tracks: 1, 3), acoustic guitar (tracks: 2, 3), electric guitar (tracks: 2, 3), strokes (track: 3)
- Amrit Sharma – programming (tracks: 2, 3, 4)
- Hrishikesh Gangan – programming (tracks: 2, 3), backing vocalist (tracks: 1, 3)
- Shruti Dhasmana – backing vocalist (tracks: 3, 4)
- Maanuni Desai – backing vocalist (track: 3)
- Aarti Shenai – backing vocalist (track: 3)
- Rana Majumdar – backing vocalist (track: 4)
- Sumonto Mukherjee – backing vocalist (track: 4)
- Pratiksha Kale – backing vocalist (track: 4)
- Indrajit Chetia – acoustic guitar (tracks: 2, 3), electric guitar (tracks: 2, 3)
- Ishan Das – acoustic guitar (track: 4), electric guitar (track: 4)
- Tapas Roy – strokes (track: 4)
- Swar Mehta – recording engineer (White Noise Collectives) [all tracks]
- Eric Pillai – mixing engineer (Future Sound of Bombay) [all tracks]
- Michael Edwin Pillai – assistant mixing engineer
- Romil Ved – music production head
