= Uri: The Surgical Strike =

2019 Indian film by Aditya Dhar

- Theatrical release poster
- Directed by: Aditya Dhar
- Written by: Aditya Dhar
- Produced by: Ronnie Screwvala
- Starring: Vicky Kaushal; Yami Gautam; Paresh Rawal; Kirti Kulhari; Mohit Raina
- Cinematography: Mitesh Mirchandani
- Edited by: Shivkumar V. Panicker
- Music by: Shashwat Sachdev
- Production company: RSVP Movies
- Distributed by: RSVP Movies
- Release date: 11 January 2019
- Running time: 138 minutes
- Country: India
- Language: Hindi
- Budget: ₹44 crore
- Box office: ₹342.06 crore

Uri: The Surgical Strike is a 2019 Indian Hindi-language war action film written and directed by debutant Aditya Dhar and produced by Ronnie Screwvala under the RSVP Movies banner. An account based on the real story of the retaliation to the 2016 Uri attack, the film stars Vicky Kaushal along with Yami Gautam, Paresh Rawal, Kirti Kulhari, and Mohit Raina in pivotal roles, and tells the story of Major Vihaan Shergill (Kaushal) of the Para (Special Forces), who played a leading role in the events.

Screwvala announced the film in September 2017, a year after the 2016 Indian Line of Control strike. Principal photography began in June 2018 in Serbia where it was largely shot before being wrapped in September in Mumbai.

Uri was released on 11 January 2019. Made on a budget of ₹44 crore, Uri: The Surgical Strike grossed ₹342.73 crore (US$48.67 million) worldwide, emerging as the fourth highest-grossing Hindi film of 2019. The film received various accolades including National Film Awards and Filmfare Awards.

== Plot ==
The film is divided into five chapters.

=== The Seven Sisters (North-east India) ===
The first chapter opens up with an ambush in June 2015 on a convoy of Indian Army troops in Chandel, Manipur by NSCN(K) militants. In retaliation, Major Vihaan Singh Shergill, a Para SF officer and his unit, including his brother-in-law Major Karan Kashyap, infiltrate and attack the Northeastern militants and also kill the key leader responsible for the ambush. After a successful strike, the Prime Minister of India congratulates him and the whole unit at a formal dinner. Vihaan requests early retirement as he wants to be close with his mother, who is suffering from Stage VI Alzheimer's. The prime minister offers him a desk job at New Delhi near his mother instead of retirement, to which he agrees.

=== An Unsettling Peace (New Delhi, India) ===
The second chapter shows Vihaan taking up a desk job at the Integrated Defence Staff HQ in New Delhi and spending time with his family. This segment also briefly describes the Pathankot attack and the Pampore attack. Nurse Jasmine D'Almeida is assigned to take care of Vihaan's mother. Vihaan meets an Indian Air Force pilot, Flight Lieutenant Seerat Kaur, who is trying to prove her patriotism to her dead husband Captain Jaskirat Singh Rangi, an army officer who died in an ambush. One day, Vihaan's mother goes missing. He searches for her, and blames Jasmine for her ignorance, saying there is no need for her security. Vihaan's mother is found under a bridge, and Jasmine reveals she is an intelligence agent.

=== Bleed India with a Thousand Cuts (Uri, Jammu Kashmir, India) ===
On 18 September 2016, four heavily armed militants attack the brigade headquarters at Uri in Jammu and Kashmir at dawn, killing 19 soldiers in their sleep. The terrorists are killed, but Karan dies in a grenade explosion as he accidentally pulls the pin attached to a terrorist's rifle he picked up to examine. The whole family is devastated, including Vihaan. The Ministry decides to take strict action against the perpetrators of the attack. National Security Advisor Govind Bharadwaj suggests the idea of a surgical strike, inspired by Operation Wrath of God conducted by Israel. The prime minister gives it a go and gives ten days for the strike. Vihaan leaves his desk job and leaves for the Northern Command base in Udhampur. He requests Chief of the Army Staff General Arjun Singh Rajawat to add him to the operation and he agrees. Vihaan chooses the elite Ghatak Force commandos from the Bihar Regiment and the Dogra Regiment along with the special forces as most of the soldiers killed in the attack were from these regiments. Vihaan informs them they can no longer use their phones and disguises the mission as regular training exercises. The commandos begin their training.

=== Naya Hindustan (New India) (New Delhi, India) ===
During the planning, Govind ropes in ISRO (for providing satellite images), DRDO (for drone surveillance), and RAW (for intelligence). When he goes to meet DRDO Chief Brian D'Souza, he meets an intern named Ishaan who has developed a drone called Garuda which looks and is shaped like an Eagle. With the help of the drones and satellite images they get the exact location of the hideouts and training camps of the terrorists. Jasmine reveals her true name Pallavi Sharma to Vihaan, and during an interrogation, the two extract information about who planned the attack. Vihaan chooses Seerat as his pilot, she agrees. The commandos also start training under Vihaan. The Pakistani officials suspect the Indian activities but dismiss them due to underestimation.

=== The Surgical Strike (Azad Kashmir, Pakistan) ===
On the night of 28 September, the commandos leave for the strike in Pakistan-administered Azad Kashmir in Mi-17 helicopters. During the mission, Vihaan's helicopter is forced to not cross the Line of Control due to latest intelligence from spies in Pakistan that the Pakistani Army has deployed an "AWAC" radar-based surface to air missile system in Muzaffarabad sector to bring their helicopter down. He and his team improvise by going on foot through a manned cave. His teams successfully infiltrate and kill all the terrorists at the launchpads. Vihaan kills Idris and Jabbar, the perpetrators of the Uri attack. The local police are alerted, and the commandos who are low on ammunition and time escape. On their way back, they are attacked from both a nearby machine gun bunker and a Pakistani Air Force Mi-17 Helicopter scrambled to intercept Vihaan's team. Flight Lieutenant Seerat comes to their rescue by firing back at the Pakistani gunship, thus driving it away and eliminating the machine gun bunker. His team successfully crosses the LoC on the Indian side with no casualties. Vihaan lands at Hindon Air Force Station. The film ends with him, Pallavi, Govind, and the commandos having dinner with the prime minister.

In the post-credits scene, Zameer, a Pakistani minister, wakes up and shouts in frustration while seeing the news of India's successful surgical strike. The scene cuts to a title card reading "Jai Hind".

== Cast ==
- Vicky Kaushal as Major Vihaan Singh Shergill, Para SF (based on Colonel Kapil Yadav)
- Paresh Rawal as NSA Govind Bhardwaj (based on Ajit Doval)
- Yami Gautam as Jasmine D'Almedia / Pallavi Sharma, an undercover R&AW agent
- Mohit Raina as Major Karan Kashyap (Para SF sniper), Vihaan's brother-in-law (based on Colonel MN Rai)
- Kirti Kulhari as Flight Lieutenant Seerat Kaur, Indian Air Force
- Rajit Kapur as Prime Minister of India (based on Narendra Modi)
- Shishir Sharma as General Arjun Singh, Chief of the Army Staff (based on General Dalbir Singh Suhag)
- Swaroop Sampat as Suhasini Shergill, Vihaan's mother
- Dhairya Karwa as Captain Sartaj Singh Chandhok, Para SF
- Akashdeep Arora as Ishaan Wattal, intern at the DRDO
- Manasi Parekh as Neha Shergill Kashyap, Karan's wife and Vihaan's sister
- Riva Arora as Suhani Kashyap, Vihaan's niece
- Satyajit Sharma as Lieutenant General Ajay Garewal (based on Lieutenant General Deependra Singh Hooda)
- Yogesh Soman as Defence Minister Ravinder Agnihotri (based on Manohar Parrikar)
- Navtej Hundal as Home Minister of India (based on Rajnath Singh)
- Kamal Malik as Interior Minister of Pakistan
- Ivan Sylvester Rodrigues as Brian D'Sousa, DRDO Chief (based on S. Christopher)
- Abrar Zahoor as Idris Qayoom Al Baghdadi, Uri attack planner
- Ujjwal Chopra as Shahid Khan, Aasma's husband; an undercover R&AW agent in Pakistan
- Rukhsar Rehman as Aasma Khan, an undercover R&AW agent in Pakistan
- Rakesh Bedi as an ISI agent, working as an undercover R&AW agent
- Anil George as Zameer Ul Hasan, Pakistani Minister
- Sunil Palwal as Jabbar Firozi, Uri attack planner
- Sunil Mehra as Defence Minister of Pakistan
- Adarsh Gautam as Brigadier Afzal
- Ajit Shidhaye as Pakistan Army officer Zubair Mehmood
- Guru Bhullar as SF Commando Akash Singh Narula
- Padam Bhola as SF Commando Vikram Dabas
- Amaan Asif as SF Commando Zeeshan Khan
- Amit Saproo as SF Commando K. S. Venkatesh
- Anurag Mishra as SF Commando K. S. Venkatesh
- Bhupendra Singh Negi as SF Commando Ajay Shukla
- Beant Singh Buttar as SF Commando Chetan Jha
- Dev Raj Ghosh as SF Commando Neloy Banerjee
- Gagan Singh Khanna as SF Commando Jagjit Singh Sandhu
- Harshit Dang as SF Commando Rohit Vyas
- Himanshu Sharma as SF Commando A. S. Rao
- Nishant Singh as SF Commando Rahil Hussain
- Rahul Tyagi as SF Commando Shiraz Ali
- Rajvir Chauhan as SF Commando Uday Singh Rathod
- Tashi Tobgay as SF Commando Ratan Thapa
- James W. C. Meetei as SF Commando Robin Nagrum
- Aamir Yaseen as Faheem Khan, Pakistani terrorist involved in the URI attack

== Production ==
Uri was announced by producer Ronnie Screwvala one year after the surgical strike in September 2017. The film was to be directed by debutant Aditya Dhar. He said the film is "the story of what was imagined to have happened in those eleven days." Principal photography began in June 2018 and was finished in September. Kaushal went through extensive military training for five months and gained weight. He trained for five hours a day and did three to four hours of military training to enhance stamina. He also received gun training at a naval base in Cuffe Parade in Mumbai. He called it "physically the most challenging film for me". He injured his arm while filming an action sequence in the film.

Kaushal and the supporting cast trained at Mumbai's Navy Nagar with Captains and Majors teaching them slithering, using arms and ammunitions and other drills used by the armed forces. Uri was largely shot in Serbia and was wrapped up in Mumbai. The Indo-Pak border, the LOC and other areas resembling military posts and terrorist camps were recreated in Serbia. Yami Gautam underwent mixed martial arts training. She called the process of shooting "exhausting yet enjoyable." The film also stars Paresh Rawal, Mohit Raina, Ivan Rodrigues and Kirti Kulhari. Screwvala said the film has elements of "war, action, and strategy based on a true story" and the "Indian audience is yet to watch such experience in cinema."

== Marketing and release ==
The film was released in theatres on 11 January 2019, and digitally on ZEE5 on 19 March 2019.

To curtail piracy, the makers of Uri: The Surgical Strike deployed a 3.8 gigabyte fake version of the film over networks like torrent. However, the film was leaked by the bootleg website Tamil Rockers within a week of release. The Telugu dubbed version of the film was released with the same name on 14 June 2019.

== Music ==
The film score and songs were composed and produced by Shashwat Sachdev, with lyrics written by Kumaar, Raj Shekhar, and Abhiruchi Chand.

== Reception ==
=== Critical response ===
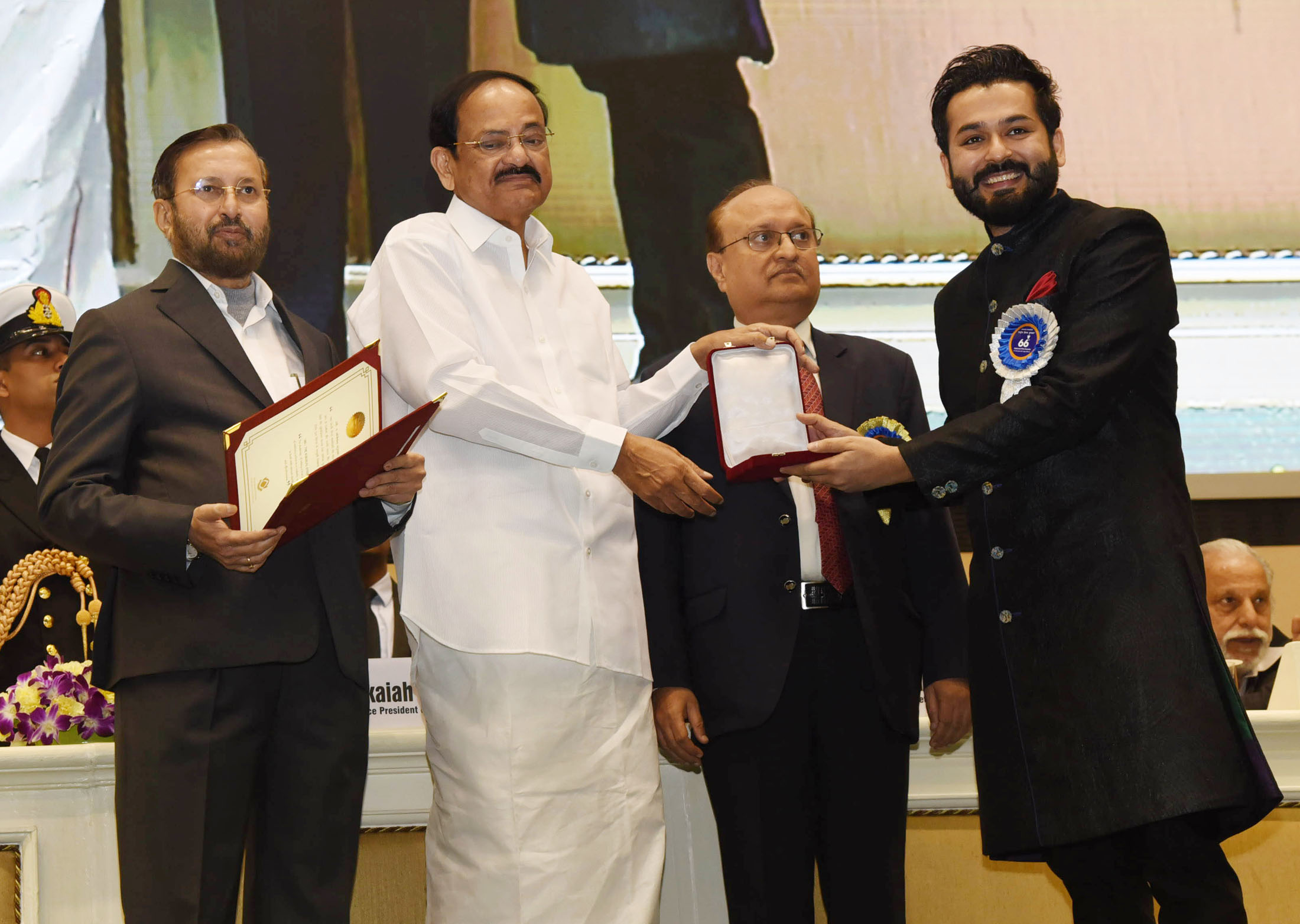
Aditya Dhar receiving National Film Award for Best Director

On the review aggregator website Rotten Tomatoes, 57% of 14 critics' reviews are positive, with an average rating of 5.8/10. Namrata Joshi, writing for The Hindu, said "Whichever side of the political divide one may stand, one can't dismiss Dhar's canniness and craft and Vicky Kaushal as the Army officer was brilliant." Amman Khurana of Times Now News, giving 4 stars out of 5, said "Uri: The Surgical Strike is a rather mature film. It somehow knows that it is catering to the viewer that is tired of watching the men in uniform who thump their chests to show their love and passion for the country." He further said: "The stunning cinematography and the VFX work ensure that Uri: The Surgical Strike does not pass off as a comic-book account of the operation." He concludes: "Uri: The Surgical Strike is a good one-time watch. If not for anything else, watch it for Vicky Kaushal, who brings the right amount of intensity to his role and drives the film from start to finish."

Rajeev Masand of News 18 gave the film 3 out of 5 stars and said "Vicky Kaushal is in especially good form as the protagonist, looking every bit the army man. He brings both the bulked-up physicality and the sort of steely determination that the part requires." Bollywood Hungama rated the move 3.5 out of 5 stars and said "On the whole, URI: THE SURGICAL STRIKE has a thrilling and a gripping narrative which instills patriotism without getting jingoistic."

Anupama Chopra of Film Companion said, "The film alternates between fact and fiction, between gritty re-creations of combat and Top Gun-style, slow-motion shots of soldiers getting out of helicopters. For the first half, Aditya manages this tight-rope walk efficiently, aided by the strong work of DOP Mitesh Mirchandani. The story-telling has the scale and the narrative beats are predictable but satisfying", but found the plot simplistic in places. Raja Sen of Hindustan Times gave 2 out of 5 stars and said, "Uri is a very good looking film — though the cinematographer appears to have been told to highlight the lens-flare in every single shot of nighttime combat — and while the action is totally brilliant." Sukanya Verma writing for Rediff.com rated the film 2.5 out of 5 stars and said "Revenge over personal loss is hardly patriotism. It's just run-of-the-mill revenge. Despite slick visuals and solid acting, Uri fails to make this distinction." Shilpa Jamkhandikar of Reuters said "But forget about nuance – the dark side of war and the human cost of it are barely dealt with."

Saibal Chatterjee of NDTV rated the film 2 out of 5 stars and said "The war actioner is both bland and patchy." Nandini Ramnath of Scroll.in said "Impressively gritty action sequences bookend moments of sycophancy towards the government." Rahul Desai of Film Companion said "Uri becomes a cautionary tale of how even an original filmmaking voice can mean little if confined to a time of strategic jingoism." Shubhra Gupta of The Indian Express rated the movie 2 out of 5 stars and said "Action, emotion, drama, it’s all there, beat for beat: more Border than Zero Dark Thirty." Tanul Thakur of The Wire said "But a film of this sort needs exceptional writing to transcend its rigid boundaries. So we ultimately find out, to no one’s surprise, that the subplot involving the family was just a ruse." Suparna Sharma of the Deccan Chronicle said "I was riveted and impressed with much of Uri’s human drama and action, despite balking at its craven desire to toady up to the government."

Renuka Vyavahare of The Times of India rated the film 4 out of 5 stars and said "Uri: The Surgical Strike is a fitting tribute to the Indian Army conceptually but cinematically, it’s not a film without flaws." Devesh Sharma of Filmfare gave 3 out of 5 stars and said "The problem is with the screenplay. Instead of watching a patriotic film, you get the feeling you're watching a revenge drama." Manjusha Radhakrishnan of Gulf News gave 3.5 out of 5 stars and said "The film is a blatant homage to the bravery displayed by the Indian army and it makes no attempts to hide its allegiance. The opponents in this film are skimmed through swiftly and remain faceless villains." Shilajit Mitra of Cinema Express rated it 2 out of 5 stars and said "Uri: The Surgical Strike plays out in the precarious sub-genre of the 'well-made' propaganda." Ajit Duara of Open said "The film is made well, with high production values and realistic battle scenes, but the theatrical release of such an action film has a limited shelf life."

Mayur Sanap of The Asian Age said "Lauding heroism in war movies is an easy sell to mass audiences but URI stays clear of jingoistic grandstanding or flag-waving patriotism." Priya Hazra of The Statesman gave 3.5 out of 5 stars and said "The film is based on a real incident and thus not much unfolds to surprise the viewers. However, what lacked in the story was in-depth research which left the second half weaker." Stutee Ghosh of The Quint rated the film 3 out of 5 stars and said "Despite all the things working for it, ‘Uri: The Surgical Strike’ could have been a far better film." Deepa Gahlot said "It is a worthy tribute to the armed forces. The claim of a New India it pushes forward is debatable."

=== Box office ===
In its opening weekend, the film earned ₹35.73 crore domestically. In the first week, the film collected ₹70.94 crore from India. It grossed ₹300 crore from India and ₹59.73 crore (US$8.48 million) from overseas, taking the worldwide gross collection to ₹359.73 crore (US$51.08 million).

The film crossed the ₹100 crore (US$14.2 million) mark in gross collection on 8th day of its release. It took 15 days to gross ₹200 crore (US$28.4 million) and in its fourth week of release, it grossed ₹300 crore (US$42.6 million). It took seven weeks to gross ₹342 crore (US$48.57 million) worldwide.

Uri: The Surgical Strike emerged as the 4th highest-grossing Bollywood film of 2019. Based on box office collections, the film became the tenth highest-grossing film by 5 March 2019 produced in Bollywood until that date.

== Awards and nominations ==
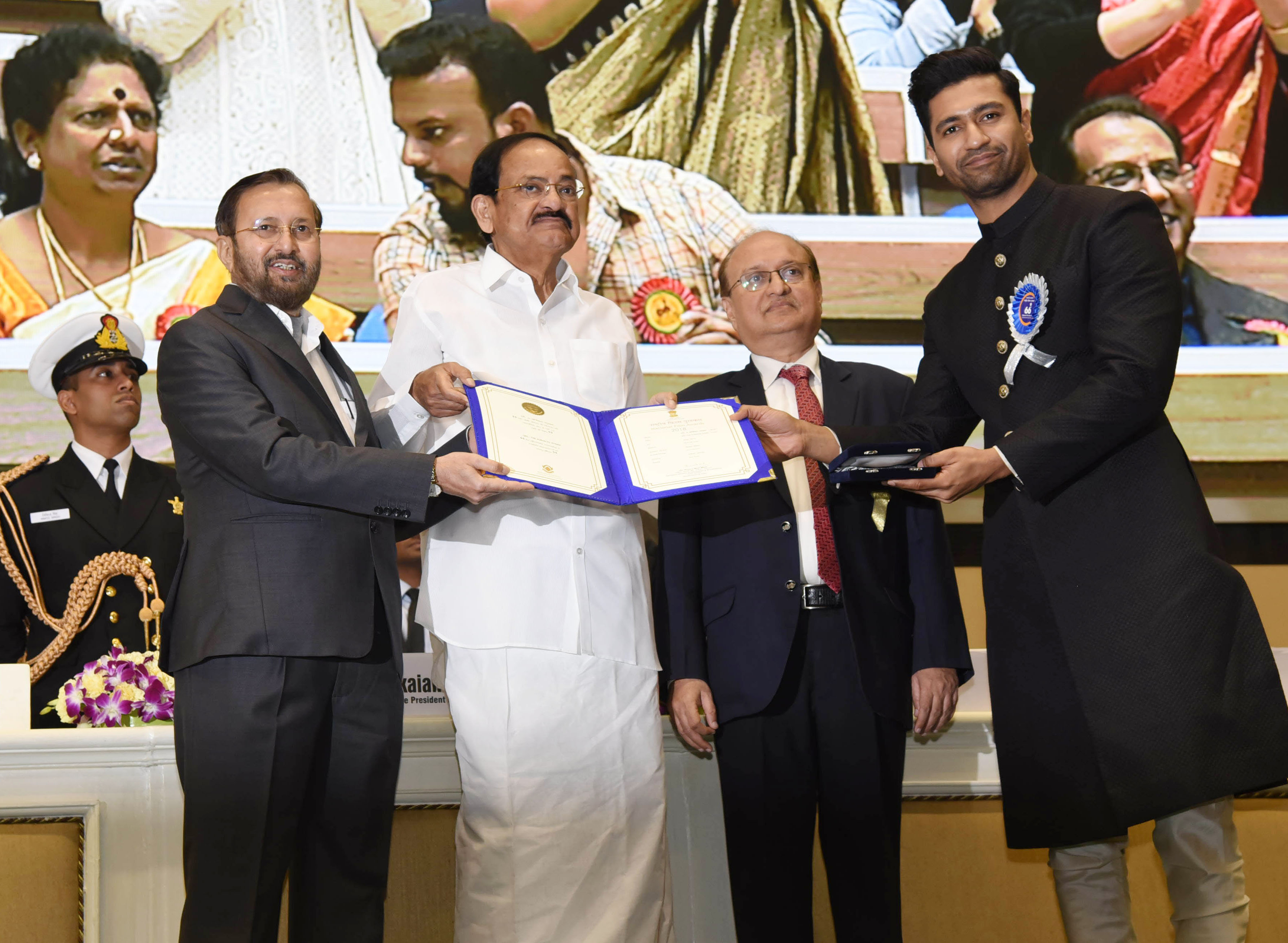
Vicky Kaushal wins National Film Award for Best Actor in a Leading Role

Ceremony	Date	Category	Recipient	Result
National Film Awards	9 August 2019	Best Director	Aditya Dhar	Won
National Film Awards	9 August 2019	Best Actor	Vicky Kaushal	Won
National Film Awards	9 August 2019	Best Audiography	Bishwadeep Chatterjee	Won
National Film Awards	9 August 2019	Best Music Director (Background Score)	Shashwat Sachdev	Won
Screen Awards	8 December 2019	Best Film	Uri: The Surgical Strike	Nominated
Screen Awards	8 December 2019	Best Director	Aditya Dhar	Nominated
Screen Awards	8 December 2019	Best Actor	Vicky Kaushal	Nominated
Screen Awards	8 December 2019	Best Debut Director	Aditya Dhar	Won
Filmfare Awards	15 February 2020	Best Film	Uri: The Surgical Strike	Nominated
Filmfare Awards	15 February 2020	Best Director	Aditya Dhar	Nominated
Filmfare Awards	15 February 2020	Best Actor	Vicky Kaushal	Nominated
Filmfare Awards	15 February 2020	Best Background Score	Shashwat Sachdev	Nominated
Filmfare Awards	15 February 2020	Best Cinematography	Mitesh Mirchandani	Nominated
Filmfare Awards	15 February 2020	Best Action	Stefan Richter	Nominated
Filmfare Awards	15 February 2020	Best Editing	Shivkumar V Panicker	Won
Filmfare Awards	15 February 2020	Best Production Design	Aditya Kanwar	Nominated
Filmfare Awards	15 February 2020	Best Special Effects	YRF Studios	Nominated
Filmfare Awards	15 February 2020	Best Debut Director	Aditya Dhar	Won
Filmfare Awards	15 February 2020	R. D. Burman Award For Upcoming Music Talent	Shashwat Sachdev	Won
IIFA Awards	24 November 2021	Best Film	Uri: The Surgical Strike	Nominated
IIFA Awards	24 November 2021	Best Director	Aditya Dhar	Won
IIFA Awards	24 November 2021	Best Story	Aditya Dhar	Nominated
IIFA Awards	24 November 2021	Best Actor	Vicky Kaushal	Nominated
IIFA Awards	24 November 2021	Best Background Score	Shashwat Sachdev	Won
IIFA Awards	24 November 2021	Best Sound Design	Ravi Soni	Won

== Impact ==
The protagonist (played by Kaushal) in the film asks his squad "How's the Josh?" (Hinglish for "How's the spirit?") The squad replies "High, Sir!". This question is asked to the cadets in military academies in India to test their enthusiasm. The dialogue went viral over Indian social media and eventually became a cultural phenomenon.

The dialogue was quoted by several individuals and institutions. The Indian Prime Minister Narendra Modi, while inaugurating the National Museum of Indian Cinema of Films Division of India in Mumbai, asked this question at the beginning of his address to the film fraternity attending the ceremony. The Indian Cricket Team, after winning ODI series in New Zealand, raised the morale of the team by asking "How’s the Josh?" for the coming Twenty20 series; and Mumbai Police used the slogan to raise awareness about cybersecurity.
