= Lakshya (actor) =

Indian actor (born 1996)

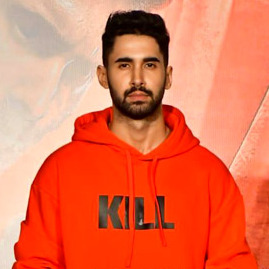
- Lakshya in 2024
- Born: Laksh Lalwani; 19 April 1996 (age 30); Delhi, India
- Occupation: Actor
- Years active: 2015–present

Laksh Lalwani (born 19 April 1996), known mononymously as Lakshya, is an Indian actor. He played the titular warrior in the period drama series Porus (2017–2018) and made his feature film debut with a starring role in the action film Kill (2023) which earned him the Filmfare Award for Best Male Debut. He has since starred as an aspiring actor in the satirical drama series The Ba***ds of Bollywood (2025) for Netflix. In 2026, he was featured in Forbes Asia's 30 Under 30 list.

== Career ==
=== Early television career (2015–2018) ===
In 2015, Lakshya made his acting debut with the television series Warrior High. He followed this with the role of Yuvraj Madhav Shekhawat/Krish in the supernatural series Adhuri Kahaani Hamari (2015–2016) and briefly appeared in Pyaar Tune Kya Kiya.

In November 2016, Lakshya joined Ekta Kapoor's romantic drama series Pardes Mein Hai Meraa Dil (2016–2017) in the supporting role of Veer Mehra, which proved to be his first breakthrough. He gained further attention for his portrayal of the titular warrior in the historical TV show Porus (2017–2018), which is among the most expensive Indian television shows in history.

=== Transition to films (2019–present) ===
In 2019, Lakshya signed a three-film deal with Karan Johar's Dharma Productions and was cast in two romances, Dostana 2 and Bedhadak which were both shelved due to issues during production. He expressed the emotional toll the experience had on him and revealed his uncertainty about pursuing a career in films afterward.

In 2024, Lakshya ultimately made his film debut with Dharma Productions' action film Kill, in which he played Amrit, a stoic army man who has to fight off dacoits in a running train. It premiered at the 2023 Toronto International Film Festival and was theatrically released the following year to largely positive reviews. Barry Hertz of The Globe and Mail wrote that he "conjures the hero with frightening ferocity". Kill emerged as a box-office failure, for his performance Lakshya earned several Best Male Debut awards, including the Filmfare Award for Best Male Debut.

The following year, Lakshya led the Netflix satirical drama series The Ba***ds of Bollywood (2025) directed by Aryan Khan, which opened to positive reception. Sahir Avik D’Souza of The Quint was appreciative of his portrayal of an aspiring actor navigating the Hindi film industry, as well as his chemistry with co-star Sahher Bambba, but felt that the supporting cast had delivered stronger performances. In 2026, Lakshya starred as a troubled young man struggling with his girlfriend's (played by Ananya Panday) unexpected pregnancy in the romantic drama Chand Mera Dil, produced by Johar. His performance had a mixed reception from critics; India Today's Vineeta Kumar dismissed his performance as a "completely forgettable" regression from his work in Kill but Anuj Kumar of Firstpost believed that the actor had effectively "captur[ed] the agony of a young Indian boy who is unprepared for responsibility". Chand Mera Dil failed commercially.

== Filmography ==
Key
†	Denotes films or television productions that have not yet been released

=== Films ===
Year	Title	Role	Notes
2024	Kill	Capt. Amrit Rathod	
2026	Chand Mera Dil	Aarav Rawat	

=== Television ===
Year	Title	Role	Notes
2015	Warrior High	Parth Samthaan	
2015–2016	Adhuri Kahaani Hamari	Yuvraj Madhav Shekhawat,Krish Malhotra and Karan	
2016	Pyaar Tune Kya Kiya	Aarav Gaitonde	
2016–2017	Pardes Mein Hai Mera Dil	Veer Mehra	
2017–2018	Porus	Porus	

=== Web Series ===
Year	Title	Role	Notes
2025	The Ba***ds of Bollywood	Aasmaan Singh	

== Awards and nominations ==
Year	Award	Category	Work	Result	Ref
2025	25th IIFA Awards	Star Debut of the Year (Male)	Kill	Won	
2025	Zee Cine Awards	Best Male Debut	Kill	Won	
2025	Pinkvilla Style Icons Awards	Best Male Debut	Kill	Won	
2025	70th Filmfare Awards	Best Male Debut	Kill	Won	
