= Kill (film) =

2024 Indian film by Nikhil Nagesh Bhat

- Theatrical release poster
- Directed by: Nikhil Nagesh Bhat
- Written by: Nikhil Nagesh Bhat
- Produced by: Karan Johar; Guneet Monga; Apoorva Mehta; Achin Jain
- Dialogues by: Ayesha Syed; Nikhil Nagesh Bhat
- Starring: Lakshya; Raghav Juyal; Ashish Vidyarthi; Harsh Chhaya; Tanya Maniktala; Abhishek Chauhan
- Cinematography: Rafey Mehmood
- Edited by: Shivkumar V. Panicker
- Music by: Score: Ketan Sodha; Songs: Vikram Montrose; Shashwat Sachdev; Haroon-Gavin
- Production companies: Dharma Productions; Sikhya Entertainment
- Distributed by: AA Films
- Release dates: 7 September 2023 (TIFF); 5 July 2024 (India)
- Running time: 105 minutes
- Country: India
- Language: Hindi
- Budget: ₹40 crore
- Box office: est. ₹47.12 crore

Kill is a 2023 Indian Hindi-language action thriller film written and directed by Nikhil Nagesh Bhat and produced by Dharma Productions and Sikhya Entertainment. The film, which is inspired by a train robbery experienced by Bhat in 1995, stars Lakshya, Raghav Juyal, Ashish Vidyarthi, Harsh Chhaya, Tanya Maniktala and Abhishek Chauhan.

Kill premiered at the Toronto International Film Festival on 7 September 2023, where it was first runner-up for the People's Choice Award: Midnight Madness. It was also screened at the Tribeca Film Festival in June 2024.

Kill was theatrically released on 5 July 2024 to positive reviews from critics, who praised its cinematography, visuals, soundtrack, cast performances and action sequences but criticized the overly graphic violence and plot. The film grossed ₹47.12 crore against a budget of ₹40 crore.

Kill received fifteen nominations at the 70th Filmfare Awards including Best Film, Best Director (Bhat), Best Male Debut (Lakshya) and Best Supporting Actor (Juyal) and won Best Male Debut (Lakshya).

== Plot ==
Amrit, an NSG commando, and his colleague Viresh return to Palampur, Himachal Pradesh. Amrit has been in a long-term relationship with his girlfriend Tulika Singh, the daughter of a powerful business tycoon, Baldev Singh Thakur. One day, Baldev arranges Tulika's engagement to another man, prompting Amrit and Viresh to travel to Ranchi for the engagement. In Ranchi, Amrit pleads with Tulika to elope with him, but she refuses as she fears the repercussions from Baldev.

The next day, Tulika and her family board a superfast express train from Ranchi to New Delhi. Unbeknownst to them, Amrit and Viresh also board the train. During the journey, Amrit seizes an opportunity to propose to Tulika. However, as the train reaches Daltonganj station, a group of armed dacoits, led by the cunning Fani Bhushan, boards the train. Their plan is to rob specific coaches and make a swift escape. Waiting for them with their getaway plan is Fani's father Beni Bhushan, a notorious dacoit leader, and other members of their gang. They also have jammers to prevent news of their heist from getting out until they escape.

During the heist, Fani learns that Baldev Singh Thakur is also on the train. He attempts to kidnap Baldev and his family, but is attacked by Amrit and Viresh. In the scuffle, Viresh kills Babban—Fani's uncle and Beni's brother—to save Tulika's mothers. Enraged, Fani and Babban's son Ravi abandon the heist to exact revenge, alongside other dacoits. Amrit and Viresh fight off a few bandits until Fani uses a child as a hostage to stop them before using a homemade firearm to shoot Viresh, but misses. Fani captures a wounded Viresh, while Amrit takes Ravi hostage. Amrit searches for Tulika's sister Ahaana, who is trapped somewhere in the train. Eventually, the train stops at the railway crossing where Beni and more bandits climb aboard, having just been informed of Babban's death.

Fani plans to use Viresh as bait to capture Amrit, who fights through multiple bandits before being knocked out by the gang's enforcer Siddhi, where Arif, a fellow passenger, is killed while helping Viresh and Amrit. Tulika confronts Fani, who fatally stabs her and throws her off the train, enraging Amrit. He then goes on a killing spree against the bandits. A shocked Beni chastises Fani for killing Tulika, fearing retribution from Baldev. However, Fani sticks to his original plan of kidnapping Baldev's entire family for ransom. As Amrit continues his rampage, the bandits—fearing for their lives—beg Beni to let them off the train, but Beni convinces them to stay by reminding them that they have already incurred Baldev's wrath so it is better to go along with the revised plan.

To further demoralize the bandits, Amrit hangs the corpses, including Siddhi's father, in a coach. Meanwhile, Baldev, Viresh, Arif's brother Sohail, and other passengers manage to block access to other coaches and alert Railway Security personnel, who were previously unaware of the hijacking due to network jammers. Fani and others attempt to move outside, narrowly escaping being shot. Amrit again encounters Siddhi and engages in a brutal fight; when Siddhi overpowers Amrit and is about to throw him off the train, Arif and Sohail's parents attack Siddhi from behind, bludgeoning his skull with a hammerhead and killing him.

Ahaana and Viresh are rescued by the police, and are reunited with Baldev, but Fani and two other bandits who have boarded the train again eliminate the police and take them hostage, killing a weak and wounded Viresh in the process. While fighting in a darkened coach, Amrit killed Ravi. However, he's deceived by a bandit posing as a passenger, knocked out, and taken captive. As Fani taunts Amrit about the death of Viresh and Beni gets into an argument with him about not killing Baldev, Amrit takes advantage of the chaos and engages the last of the bandits, including Beni, burning his entire head with lighter fluid and a zippo. Amrit finally faces off against Fani, the sole remaining dacoit. Fani repeatedly stabs him while taunting him about Tulika, but Amrit ultimately gains the upper hand, finishing him off with a hammer and fists. As security personnel and paramedics board the train at Pandit Deen Dayal Upadhaya Railway Station in Uttar Pradesh and rescue the passengers, a heavily injured Amrit sits on a bench and hallucinates Tulika sitting beside him.

== Cast ==
- Lakshya as Captain Amrit Rathod, a NSG Commando
- Raghav Juyal as Fani Bhushan
- Tanya Maniktala as Tulika Singh
- Abhishek Chauhan as Captain Viresh Chatwal , a NSG Commando
- Ashish Vidyarthi as Beni
- Harsh Chhaya as Baldev Singh Thakur
- Adrija Sinha as Ahaana Singh
- Avanish Pandey as TTE
- Parth Tiwari as Siddhi
- Akshay Vichare as Ujala
- Jitendra Kumar Sharma as Akhilesh Jha (RPF personnel)
- Rupesh Kumar Charanpahari as Bishnu
- Sahil Gangurde as Badlu
- Priyam Gupta as Kulli
- Vivek Kashyap as Mukund
- Sameer Kumar as Bechan
- Calib Logan as Brahmeshwar
- Moses Marton as Murari
- Riyaz Khan as Surajbhan
- Shakti Singh as Laddan
- Shivam Parmar as Amrit's friend
- Bilal Kazi
- Pechap Kumar
- Arun Thakur as Jass Pratap Singh, Tulika's groom
- Meenal Kapoor as Tulika's mother
- Madhu Raja as Tulika's paternal grandmother

== Production ==
The production of the film began in June 2022, with the working title Aaghat starring Lakshya (in his feature film debut) and Tanya Maniktala (in her second film). Less than a month prior to its premiere at Toronto, Dharma Productions and Sikhya Entertainment announced the film Kill to be directed by Nikhil Nagesh Bhat, as the first in a content partnership in May 2023.

In an interview with Subhash K. Jha, the director Nikhil Nagesh Bhat said that the actors had to be trained with MMA artists. Bhat said in an interview that the film was inspired by a real-life train robbery he experienced in 1995.

== Music ==
Kill

Soundtrack album by Shashwat Sachdev, Vikram Montrose, Haroon-Gavin
- Released: 5 July 2024
- Recorded: 2022–2023
- Venue: Mumbai
- Studios: The Islanders Studio; Kuhn Labs; Future Sound of Bombay
- Genre: Feature film soundtrack
- Length: 12:58
- Language: Hindi
- Label: Sony Music India
- Producers: Shashwat Sachdev; Haroon-Gavin; Vikram Montrose
External audio
- Kill - Audio Jukebox on YouTube

Shashwat Sachdev chronology
Article 370 (2024)	Kill (2024)	Ulajh (2024)

Singles from Kill
- 1. "Kill (Kaawaa Kaawaa)" Released: 18 June 2024; 2. "Nikat" Released: 29 June 2026

The first single titled "Kill (Kaawaa Kaawaa)" is sung by Sudhir Yaduvanshi, Sanj V, Shashwat Sachdev which is written and composed by Shashwat sachdev. The second single titled "Nikat" is sung by Rekha Bhardwaj and the music is composed by Haroon-Gavin with lyrics written by Siddhant Kaushal. "Jaako Raakhe Saaiyan" is composed by Vikram Montrose and written by Shekhar Astitwa.

Track listing
No.	Title	Lyrics	Music	Singer(s)	Length
1.	"Kill" (Kaawaa Kaawaa)	Shashwat Sachdev	Shashwat Sachdev	Sudhir Yaduvanshi, Sanj V, Shashwat Sachdev	3:14
2.	"Nikat"	Siddhant Kaushal	Haroon-Gavin	Rekha Bhardwaj	3:03
3.	"Jaako Raakhe Saaiyan"	Shekhar Astitwa	Vikram Montrose	Monu Rathod, Vikram Montrose	3:37
4.	"Nikat" (Dance Version)	Siddhant Kaushal	Haroon-Gavin	Shashwat Singh	3:04
Total length:					12:58

== Release ==
=== Theatrical ===
Kill premiered in the Midnight Madness section of the Toronto International Film Festival on 7 September 2023. The film had a theatrical release in India on 5 July 2024. In October 2023, Lionsgate acquired distribution rights to the film for North America and the United Kingdom, marking one of the first instances of a Hollywood studio acquiring a Hindi-language film to directly release in the United States. The film released over 1000 screens across North America. Lionsgate, in association with Roadside Attractions, later scheduled the film for a theatrical release in the United States on 4 July 2024, a day before its release in India. AA Films bought the distribution rights for Indian theatrical release. On September 5, Kill was released in Argentina by BF Distribution and by Paris Filmes in Brazil. Paradise Group released the film under the name of «Схватка» in Russian theatres on 25 July 2024. The film was released in South Korea in theatres on 28 August 2024. Kill was distributed by GaragePlay in Taiwan and released in theaters on November 22, 2024.

=== Home media ===
In India, Kill began streaming on Disney+ Hotstar from 6 September 2024 in Hindi, and later with dubs in Telugu, Tamil, and Malayalam languages from 24 September 2024.

Internationally, the film was released by Lionsgate films digitally on 23 July 2024, with its Blu-ray editions releasing on 10 September 2024.

== Reception ==
=== Box office ===
The film was made on a budget of ₹40 crore. It grossed ₹28.75 crore from India and ₹18.37 crore overseas for a worldwide total of ₹47.12 crore. It became a Commercial Success at the box office

=== Critical response ===
On the review aggregator website Rotten Tomatoes, 90% of 106 critics' reviews are positive, with an average rating of 7.2/10. The website's consensus reads: "A relentless thrill ride grounded in raw emotional stakes, Kill serves up a knuckle sandwich that action fans will gleefully eat up." Metacritic rated the film with a score of 74 out of 100, based on 19 critics, citing "generally favorable" reviews.

Zinia Bandyopadhyay of India Today gave 4.5/5 stars and wrote "This is an absolute must-watch for all fans of action and otherwise." Sukanya Verma of Rediff.com gave 4/5 stars and wrote "An ultra-violent film about violence, Kill's greatest accomplishment isn't its death count alone but to challenge our perception of violence". Bollywood Hungama gave 3.5/5 stars and wrote "On the whole, Kill is a violent and stylish action entertainer." Saibal Chatterjee of NDTV gave 3.5/5 stars and wrote "Kill has a moral compass, a clear context for the 'war' that unfolds." Shubhra Gupta of The Indian Express wrote "‘Kill’ is a lean, mean killing machine." Shilajit Mitra of The Hindu praised Lakshya's performance and expressed "Lakshya, heavily hyped as Hindi cinema’s new ‘killing machine’, is sweaty, strong and seething. The young actor spurns the athleticism of a Tiger Shroff or Vidyut Jammwal, opting instead for a more centred, abrasive fighting style." Uday Bhatia of Mint wrote "Kill isn't really a hell-yeah action film. There's no slo-mo, no release, no breathing room." Nandini Ramnath of Scroll.in commented "The most memorable scene in Kill lands it straight in horror territory." Kartik Bhardwaj of The New Indian Express gave 4/5 stars and wrote "It weaves a narrative of its own. The fist fights and the flying kicks come first."

Kill earned acclaim from international critics.

Kim Newman of British Film Institute wrote "The first half isn’t exactly slower, but basic relationships have to be established before the real action can start." Jeannette Catsoulis of The New York Times wrote "Manipulative to the max (one upsetting murder is almost pornographically protracted), “Kill” is dizzyingly impressive and punishingly vicious." Catherine Bray of The Guardian opined "Kill’s objectives are achieved with an energy and enthusiasm that make it a tasty piece of action cinema which doesn’t pull its punches; it’s finger-cracking good." Kevin Maher of The Times observed "The plot is painfully perfunctory, and places a lethal “national security guard commando” called Amrit". Nate Richard of Collider rated the film B+ and wrote "Nikhil Nagesh Bhat's aggressively violent action flick is destined to become a cult classic." Peter Debruge of Variety wrote "As brutal a film as the country has ever produced, Kill is a shockingly graphic action showcase from an industry that typically plays violence in a more cartoony register." Randy Myers of The Mercury News stated "After a groan-inducing 15 minutes of exposition, “Kill” lets go of all that baggage to become an outright blast while making a convincing argument for Lakshya becoming our next big action star."

Frank Scheck of The Hollywood Reporter observed "The fight scenes are extremely well choreographed, filmed and edited, but they’re so relentless in their non-stop pacing that the viewing experience becomes numbing." David Ehrlich of IndieWire rated the film B+ and expressed "“Kill” makes very, very good on its goofy title by the time all is said and done, but perhaps the most surprising thing about Bhat's action extravaganza is that it inverts expectations without ever getting off-track." Shakyl Lambert of CGMagazine rated 8.5/10 and wrote "Kill is one of the best action films of the year, and action fans need to keep this one on their radar." Matt Donato of /Film rated the film 9 stars out of 10. He also stated "No joyous Bollywood dance interludes — this isn't RRR. Bhat's sublimely savage Kill has more in common with take-no-prisoners Indonesian badassery like The Night Comes for Us or The Raid, accentuating breakneck violence that flows like a gushing river of blood from gaping knife wounds." Ross McIndoe of Slant Magazine wrote "The action is kinetic and chaotic as bodies are sent bouncing off seats, windows, floors, and ceilings." Andrew Mack of Screen Anarchy observed "The violence is not fancy and intricate, but fast and harsh, with a survivor’s instinct at the forefront." Barry Hertz of The Globe and Mail commented "For its first half-hour, Kill’s fights are plentiful if slightly pedestrian in their staging and speed." Jonathan Hickman of Newnan Times-Herald gave 7/10 stars and wrote "By removing much of the heavy firepower associated with guns, Bhat’s film delivers visceral, bone-crunching sequences that have a significant impact despite their relatively overblown nature." Critic Simon Abrams of RogerEbert.com gave a mixed review and wrote "Kill ticks off most of the essential boxes for a good popcorn flick, making it easy to resist but harder to pass up." Reviewing for Time Out Phil de Semlyen gave 3/5 stars and wrote "Credit to Bhat, too, for departing with the tried-and-tested action movie template to deliver an unexpected, nihilistic mid-movie twist. The problem is the sense of déjà vu that creeps in thereafter." Lyvie Scott of Inverse gave a mixed review "Though Kill has its action down pat, it does lack a sense of narrative variety."

== Accolades ==
Year	Award	Category	Nominee/Work	Result	Ref.
2025	25th IIFA Awards	Best Film	Kill	Nominated	
2025	25th IIFA Awards	Best Director	Nikhil Nagesh Bhat	Nominated	
2025	25th IIFA Awards	Best Performance in a Negative Role	Raghav Juyal	Won	
2025	25th IIFA Awards	Star Debut of the Year – Male	Lakshya Lalwani	Won	
2025	25th IIFA Awards	Best Female Playback Singer	Rekha Bhardwaj for "Nikat"	Nominated	
2025	25th IIFA Awards	Best Cinematography	Rafey Mehmood	Won	
2025	25th IIFA Awards	Best Sound Design	Subash Sahoo, Ravi Soni	Won	
2025	25th IIFA Awards	Best Sound Re-Recording	Subash Sahoo, Boloy Kumar Doloi, Rahul Karpe	Won	
2025	70th Filmfare Awards	Best Film	Kill	Nominated	
2025	70th Filmfare Awards	Best Director	Nikhil Nagesh Bhat	Nominated	
2025	70th Filmfare Awards	Best Supporting Actor	Raghav Juyal	Nominated	
2025	70th Filmfare Awards	Best Male Debut	Lakshya	Won	
2025	70th Filmfare Awards	Best Story	Nikhil Nagesh Bhat	Nominated	
2025	70th Filmfare Awards	Best Screenplay	Nikhil Nagesh Bhat	Nominated	
2025	70th Filmfare Awards	Best Lyricist	Siddhant Kaushal	Nominated	
2025	70th Filmfare Awards	Best Female Playback Singer	Rekha Bhardwaj	Nominated	
2025	70th Filmfare Awards	Best Art Direction	Mayur Sharma	Won	
2025	70th Filmfare Awards	Best Cinematography	Rafey Mahmood	Won	
2025	70th Filmfare Awards	Best Editing	Shivkumar V. Panicker	Won	
2025	70th Filmfare Awards	Best Sound Design	Subhash Sahoo	Won	
2025	70th Filmfare Awards	Best Background Score	Ketan Sodha	Nominated	
2025	70th Filmfare Awards	Best Action	Oh Sea Young and Parvez Shaikh	Won	
2025	70th Filmfare Awards	Best Special Effects	Lavan and Kushan (Digital Turbo Media) and Ashutosh Pandey (Reflections Pictures)	Nominated	

== Remake ==
On 1 July 2024, three days prior to Kill's North American theatrical release, Lionsgate and 87Eleven Entertainment, which have previously collaborated on the John Wick franchise, announced an English remake of the film. Additionally, Dharma Productions issued a statement that there will be no further remakes in other languages for the film aside from English.
