= Chand Mera Dil =

2026 Indian film by Vivek Soni

- Theatrical release poster
- Directed by: Vivek Soni
- Screenplay by: Tushar Paranjape; Vivek Soni
- Story by: Vivek Soni
- Dialogues by: Vivek Soni; Tushar Paranjape; Akshat Ghildial
- Produced by: Hiroo Yash Johar; Karan Johar; Adar Poonawalla; Apoorva Mehta; Somen Mishra; Marijke deSouza
- Starring: Ananya Panday; Lakshya
- Cinematography: Debojeet Ray
- Edited by: Prashanth Ramachandran
- Music by: Sachin–Jigar
- Production company: Dharma Productions
- Distributed by: Dharma Productions
- Release date: 22 May 2026
- Running time: 145 minutes
- Country: India
- Language: Hindi
- Budget: ₹25–30 crore
- Box office: ₹36.90 crore

Chand Mera Dil (transl. My Heart Is The Moon) is a 2026 Indian Hindi-language romantic drama film directed by Vivek Soni and co-written by Soni and Tushar Paranjape. Produced by Dharma Productions, the film stars Ananya Panday and Lakshya as two college lovers in Hyderabad, whose relationship is challenged as they enter adulthood and face new responsibilities, leading them to reconsider their idea of love. The film was released in theatres on 22 May 2026 and received mixed-to-negative reviews from critics. It culminated as a box office bomb.

== Plot ==
Aarav Rawat enters engineering college expecting nothing more than a fresh start and the usual excitement of campus life. Everything changes on his very first day when he sees Chandni Prasad performing a mesmerising fusion dance on stage during the orientation programme. Confident, vibrant and full of life, Chandni instantly captures his attention. What begins as simple admiration slowly turns into a deep fascination. Aarav expresses his feelings through small and thoughtful gestures. He quietly watches over Chandni, helps her whenever he can and finds excuses to be around her. Chandni gradually notices his sincerity and, intrigued by his gentle nature, approaches him for help with her studies. Their academic interactions soon develop into a close friendship. As they spend more time together, their bond deepens into love, and the two begin a passionate relationship, experiencing the joys and excitement of first love. Their seemingly perfect romance takes an unexpected turn when Chandni discovers that she is pregnant. The news completely changes the course of their lives. Overwhelmed by the situation, Aarav believes that they are far too young to become parents. He worries that a child would destroy their dreams and ambitions before they have even had the chance to build their futures. He encourages Chandni to consider an abortion, hoping they can continue their education and pursue their careers. Chandni initially agrees, but when the moment arrives at the hospital, she finds herself unable to go through with the procedure. She decides that she wants to keep the baby, despite knowing how difficult the journey ahead will be. Faced with her decision, Aarav struggles with fear and uncertainty but ultimately chooses to stand beside her and support her. The couple then gathers the courage to tell their families about the pregnancy and their intention to marry. Instead of receiving understanding and support, they are met with disappointment and rejection from both sides. Their families refuse to accept the relationship and consider them too immature to take such a major responsibility. Feeling isolated and abandoned, Aarav and Chandni find comfort in their close friends, who step forward to help them. With their friends support, the young couple eventually gets married. After their wedding, reality begins to replace the excitement of romance. Aarav and Chandni move into a modest home and try to build a life together while preparing for the arrival of their child. Financial struggles soon become a part of their daily lives. Aarav takes up a tutoring job to earn money, balancing work with his studies and family responsibilities. Eventually, Chandni gives birth to their daughter, Kavya. Parenthood brings immense joy but also challenges neither of them anticipated. Sleepless nights, constant responsibilities and financial pressures slowly begin to strain their relationship. The carefree couple who once spent their days dreaming about the future now finds themselves exhausted and emotionally overwhelmed. Misunderstandings become frequent, and resentment starts to build. Their relationship reaches its breaking point during a heated argument when Aarav, consumed by frustration and anger, grabs Chandni and pins her to the wall. Although the he comes to his senses and apologises, it deeply affects Chandni. It reminds her of her parents' abusive relationship and her traumatic childhood. She suddenly realises that she does not want her daughter to grow up in an environment where anger and abuse are normal. Choosing her self respect and her daughter's emotional wellbeing, Chandni decides to leave. Despite still loving Aarav, she walks away from the marriage and later sends him divorce papers. Her decision shocks Aarav, who desperately wants to repair the damage and rebuild their family. Even after the separation, Chandni admits to herself that her feelings for Aarav have never disappeared. However, she cannot forget the moment when he crossed a line and became physically aggressive. Aarav repeatedly tries to win back her trust, but Chandni remains firm in her decision. He is allowed to meet Kavya every weekend, and those moments become the most important part of his life. As time passes, watching Aarav's dedication as a father slowly softens Chandni's heart. She sees the effort he makes to remain involved in his daughter's life and recognises that he has matured and changed. Nevertheless, she chooses to move forward and eventually becomes engaged to a man named Kevin, believing it may be time to start a new chapter. Meanwhile, Aarav decides to continue his education and moves to Michigan. Despite the physical distance, he remains closely connected to Kavya through regular video calls and never misses an opportunity to be present in her life. His love for both his daughter and Chandni never fades. Two years later, Aarav returns to Hyderabad to attend another college orientation event. Although Chandni initially insists that she will not be there, she unexpectedly appears on stage and performs a dance that mirrors the very first performance through which they met years earlier. The emotional moment brings back a flood of memories for Aarav and reminds both of them how deeply their lives remain intertwined. After the performance, Aarav finally admits that he still loves Chandni and wishes for another chance to build a future together. Chandni then reveals that she ended her engagement to Kevin shortly after the ceremony because she realised she could never truly move on from Aarav. Watching him remain a devoted father to Kavya and witnessing his emotional growth made her understand that the love they shared had never completely disappeared. The story concludes on a hopeful and mature note. Aarav and Chandni reunite, not as the impulsive and inexperienced college students they once were, but as two people who have learned from their mistakes, grown individually and are ready to embrace love, parenthood and their dreams with a renewed sense of understanding and commitment.

== Cast ==
- Ananya Panday as Chandni Prasad
- Lakshya as Aarav Rawat
- Aastha Singh as Jyotsna
- Paresh Pahuja as Kevin
- Manish Chaudhari as Kamal Rawat, Aarav's father
- Iravati Harshe Mayadev as Vandana Rawat, Aarav's mother
- Charu Shankar as Nivedita Prasad, Chandni's mother
- Atul Kumar as Dr. Zeeshan
- Akhil Kaimal as Chinna
- Javed Khan as King
- Manik Papneja as Sameer
- Vidushi Kaul as Nandani Rawat, Aarav's sister
- Pratham Rathod as Aarav's unruly student
- Samaira Pawar as Kavya (4 years)
- Lisa Chavan as Young Chandni

== Production ==
The film was announced in November 2024 by Karan Johar, with Ananya Panday and Lakshya in the lead roles. Principal photography took place in Jamshedpur.

=== Filming ===
Much of its storyline and shooting took place in Hyderabad.

== Soundtrack ==
Chand Mera Dil

Soundtrack album by Sachin–Jigar
- Released: 18 May 2026
- Genre: Feature film soundtrack
- Length: 33:47
- Language: Hindi
- Label: Sony Music India
- Producer: Sachin–Jigar

Sachin–Jigar chronology
Thamma (2025)	Chand Mera Dil (2026)	King (2026)

The soundtrack is composed by Sachin–Jigar, with lyrics written by Amitabh Bhattacharya. The title track, sung by Faheem Abdullah, was released on 14 April 2026. The full album was released on 18 May 2026.

Track listing
No.	Title	Singer(s)	Length
1.	"Chand Mera Dil (Title Track)"	Faheem Abdullah	4:40
2.	"Aitbaar"	Faheem Abdullah	3:48
3.	"Khasiyat"	Raghav Chaitanya, Jonita Gandhi	4:03
4.	"Phir Ajnabi"	Junaid Ahmed	4:51
5.	"Ishq Nibhaavan De"	Tushar Joshi	3:49
6.	"Chand Mera Dil (Female Version)"	Shreya Ghoshal	4:15
7.	"Tumhi Ko"	Raghav Chaitanya, Suvarna Tiwari	4:01
8.	"Ishq Nibhaavan De (Female Version)"	Neeti Mohan	4:15
Total length:			33:47

== Marketing ==
The film's teaser was released on 7 April 2026.

== Release ==
=== Theatrical ===
The film was originally scheduled for a 2025 release before being rescheduled to 10 April 2026. It was ultimately released on 22 May 2026.

=== Home media ===
The film began streaming on JioHotstar from 17 July 2026.

== Reception ==
Chand Mera Dil received mixed-to-negative reviews from critics and audiences. On the review aggregator website Rotten Tomatoes, 50% of 10 critics' reviews are positive, with an average rating of 5.8/10.

Anuj Kumar of The Hindu called it "a grounded, mature counter-narrative" delivering a "sharp dissection of modern intimacy," praising both leads for their performances. Taran Adarsh rated the film 3.5 out of 5 stars, citing "winsome performances, several terrific emotional moments, and soulful music" as its strengths, while noting the second half "could've been sharper." Bollywood Hungama also gave 3.5 out of 5, calling it "a fine romantic saga" and singling out Lakshya's performance as "stupendous." Rishabh Suri of Hindustan Times rated the film 2.5 out of 5, describing it as "frustrating, flawed, yet rewarding," praising the second half while criticising the uneven pacing.

Upon the film’s release, Panday’s Bharatanatyam-inspired dance sequence got loads of backlash and trolling on social media. Some critics questioned its representation of the dance form, describing its mudras as robotic, while others mockingly labelled the performance "Nepo Natyam".
