= Teri Baaton Mein Aisa Uljha Jiya =

2024 Indian film by Amit Joshi and Aradhana Sah

- Theatrical release poster
- Directed by: Amit Joshi; Aradhana Sah
- Written by: Amit Joshi; Aradhana Sah
- Produced by: Dinesh Vijan; Jyoti Deshpande; Laxman Utekar
- Starring: Shahid Kapoor; Kriti Sanon
- Cinematography: Laxman Utekar
- Edited by: Manish Pradhan
- Music by: Score: Sachin–Jigar; Songs: Tanishk Bagchi; Sachin–Jigar; Mitraz; Raghav; Talwiinder; NDS; MC SQUARE
- Production companies: Maddock Films; Jio Studios
- Distributed by: Pen Marudhar Entertainment
- Release date: 9 February 2024
- Running time: 143 minutes
- Country: India
- Language: Hindi
- Budget: ₹75 crore
- Box office: ₹133.64 crore

Teri Baaton Mein Aisa Uljha Jiya (transl. The heart got so entangled in your words) is a 2024 Indian Hindi-language science fiction romantic comedy film directed and written by Amit Joshi and Aradhana Sah (in their directorial debut) and produced by Maddock Films and Jio Studios. The film stars Shahid Kapoor and Kriti Sanon in the lead roles.

Principal photography commenced in October 2022 and concluded in April 2023. The film was released theatrically on 9 February 2024. The film grossed ₹133.64 crore, emerging as a commercial success. It became the seventh highest-grossing Hindi film of 2024.

At the 70th Filmfare Awards, it received five nominations, including Best Debut Director (Joshi and Sah) and Best Actress (Sanon).

== Plot ==
Aryan Agnihotri, a robotics engineer from Delhi based in Mumbai, is invited to the United States by his aunt Urmila Shukla, who runs a robotics company in Los Angeles. There, he meets SIFRA (Super Intelligent Female Robot Automation), whom he believes to be human. Aryan falls in love with her before discovering that she is an advanced humanoid robot created as part of an experiment.

Distressed, Aryan returns to India and agrees to an arranged marriage, but realises that he still loves SIFRA. Encouraged by his grandfather to follow his heart, he asks Urmila to send SIFRA to India under the pretext of further testing in a traditional family environment. Urmila agrees, and SIFRA's presence in Aryan's household leads to humorous and emotional situations. Unaware that she is a robot, Aryan's family accepts her as his partner.

A faulty software update later corrupts SIFRA's memory, but Aryan restores her system using a backup provided by Urmila. When Urmila learns that Aryan intends to marry SIFRA, she initially objects on the grounds of ownership, but eventually relents after an emotional discussion.

During the wedding ceremony, a power failure causes SIFRA to malfunction. Her system begins executing conflicting commands, resulting in destructive behaviour. Aryan is forced to disable her, confronting the reality of her artificial nature despite her human-like appearance.

Later, at a technology exhibition in Mumbai, Urmila unveils SIFRA 2.0, featuring a reset memory and upgraded capabilities. Although she no longer recognises Aryan, she unexpectedly displays signs of emotional response, suggesting the possibility of evolving artificial intelligence.

== Cast ==
- Shahid Kapoor as Aryan Agnihotri
- Kriti Sanon as SIFRA aka. (Super Intelligent Female Robot Automation)
- Dharmendra as Jai Singh Agnihotri
- Dimple Kapadia as Urmila Shukla, CEO of E-Robotics and Aryan's aunt
- Rakesh Bedi as Papa
- Anubha Fatehpuria as Sharmila Agnihotri
- Rajesh Kumar as Mama
- Raashul Tandon as Pappu
- Grusha Kapoor as Bua
- Brijbhushan Shukla as Foofa
- Ashish Verma as Monty Arora, a robotics engineer
- Maahi Raj Jain as Tim Tim
- Shaunak Duggal as Chintu
- Shivaani Sopuri as Pammi
- Chittransh as Kapil
- Amisha Thakur as Myra
- Rajan Kavatra as Inspector Gupta
- Manish Kumar as Constable Gujjar
- Abhishek Gaikwad as Dubey Ji
- Kamal Chellani as Vishal
- Suryansh Mishra as Kushal
- Snehal Shidam as Mangla
- Rajan Tiwari as Pandit Ji
- Janhvi Kapoor as Jiah (special appearance)

== Production ==
In August 2022, Shahid Kapoor and Kriti Sanon were signed to star in Dinesh Vijan's next robot rom-com. Production began in October 2022 and ended in April 2023. In November 2022 the song "Akhiyaan Gulab" was filmed at the Nikki Beach Resort, Dubai. In January 2023 Dharmendra started filming. In April 2023 Janhvi Kapoor appeared for her cameo. The film's title Teri Baaton Mein Aisa Uljha Jiya was revealed in January 2024.

== Soundtrack ==
Teri Baaton Mein Aisa Uljha Jiya

Soundtrack album by Tanishk Bagchi, Sachin–Jigar, Raghav, Mitraz, Talwiinder, MC Square and NDS
- Released: 5 February 2024
- Recorded: 2022–2023
- Genre: Feature film soundtrack
- Length: 16:26
- Language: Hindi
- Label: T-Series

Official audio
- Teri Baaton Mein Aisa Uljha Jiya (Full Album on YouTube

The music of Teri Baaton Mein Aisa Uljha Jiya is composed by Tanishk Bagchi, Sachin–Jigar, Raghav, Mitraz, Talwiinder, MC Square and NDS. The first single titled "Laal Peeli Akhiyaan", an adaptation of a Rajasthani song of the same name, was released on 12 January 2024. The second single, a remake of "Gulaab" by Mitraz, "Akhiyaan Gulaab" was released on 24 January 2024.

The song "Teri Baaton Mein Aisa Uljha Jiya (Title Track)" was a remake of the song "Teri Baaton (Your Words)" from the 2004 album Storyteller by the Canadian singer Raghav.

The fourth single titled "Tum Se" was released on 2 February 2024. The fifth single, a remake of "Gallan 4" by Talwiinder called "Gallan" released on 13 February 2024.

Track listing
No.	Title	Lyrics	Music	Singer(s)	Length
1.	"Laal Peeli Akhiyaan"	Neeraj Rajawat	Tanishk Bagchi	Tanishk Bagchi, Romy	3:08
2.	"Akhiyaan Gulaab"	Mitraz	Mitraz	Mitraz	2:51
3.	"Teri Baaton Mein Aisa Uljha Jiya (Title Track)"	Tanishk Bagchi	Raghav, Tanishk Bagchi	Raghav, Tanishk Bagchi, Asees Kaur	2:32
4.	"Tum Se"	Indraneel	Sachin–Jigar	Sachin–Jigar, Varun Jain, Raghav Chaitanya	4:24
5.	"Gallan (Not in the film)"	Talwiinder & MC SQUARE	Talwiinder, NDS, MC SQUARE	Talwiinder, MC SQUARE	3:31
Total length:					16:26

== Release ==
=== Theatrical ===
Initially scheduled for release on 7 December 2023, Teri Baaton Mein Aisa Uljha Jiya was released on 9 February 2024, coinciding with the Valentine's Day weekend.

=== Home media ===
The film was premiered on Amazon Prime Video from 5 April 2024.

== Reception ==
=== Box office ===
The film grossed ₹96.29 crore (US$10 million) in India and ₹37.35 crore (US$3.9 million) overseas, for a worldwide total of ₹133.64 crore (US$14 million).

=== Critical response ===
Teri Baaton Mein Aisa Uljha Jiya received mixed reviews from critics. On the review aggregator website Rotten Tomatoes, 43% of 14 critics' reviews are positive, with an average rating of 5.4/10. It received mixed-to-positive reviews from audiences.

Anupama Chopra, in her review for Film Companion said that Teri Baaton Mein Aisa Uljha Jiya is a good-looking film with foreign locations, beach and shaadi songs, stylish clothes and expansive houses and offices. The surfaces are gleaming. I wish the writing had matched". In a similar take, NDTV's Saibal Chatterjee rated the film 1.5/5 and opined "Once the novelty of the notion wears off - and that happens pretty quickly - there is little on offer here barring the fact that this is the first time that Shahid Kapoor and Kriti Sanon have teamed up".

Anuj Kumar of The Hindu had a more lukewarm response to the film, reviewing, "Shahid Kapoor and Kriti Sanon submit themselves to a fantastic idea that doesn't quite reach its potential, but provides moments of harmless fun as it probes the state of affairs in modern-day romance". News18's Titas Chowdhury rated the film 3/5 and praised Kapoor and Sanon's "scintillating chemistry".

A critic from Bollywood Hungama gave 2.5 out of 5 stars and wrote, Teri Baaton Mein Aisa Uljha Jiya rests on the fine performances but suffers due to the writing and an abrupt climax." The Indian Express's Shubhra Gupta rated the film 2 out of 5 stars and stated, "Shahid Kapoor and Kriti Sanon deliver confused film that combines sci-fi tropes with mushy Indian family drama".

== Accolades ==
Year	Award	Category	Nominee/Work	Result	Ref.
2025	25th IIFA Awards	Best Music Director	Sachin–Jigar, Tanishk Bagchi, Mitraz, Raghav, Talwiinder, NDS, MC SQUARE	Nominated	
2025	25th IIFA Awards	Best Male Playback Singer	Mitraz for "Akhiyaan Gulaab"	Nominated	
2025	23rd Zee Cine Awards	Zee Cine Critics Award for Best Actor – Female	Kriti Sanon for SIFRA	Won	
2025	70th Filmfare Awards	Best Actress	Kriti Sanon	Nominated	
2025	70th Filmfare Awards	Best Debut Director	Amit Joshi and Aradhana Sah	Nominated	
2025	70th Filmfare Awards	Best Music Director	Tanishk Bagchi, Sachin–Jigar, Mitraz	Nominated	
2025	70th Filmfare Awards	Best Choreography	Shaik Jani Basha	Nominated	
2025	70th Filmfare Awards	Best Special Effects	Redefine	Nominated	

== See also ==
- Science fiction films in India
- List of science fiction films of the 2020s
