= Porus the Younger =

Ruler of Gandaris

Porus
- Born: Punjab region
- Died: Punjab region, South Asia

Porus or Poros (Ancient Greek: Πῶρος, romanized: Pôros) was an ancient Indian king who ruled over a part of the Punjab region of northwestern South Asia. He is only mentioned in Greek sources.

== Life ==
=== Background ===
Porus was the nephew of his more famous namesake, Porus the Elder, who ruled the region between the Jhelum River (Hydaspes) and Chenab (Acesines) rivers.

== Reign ==
Like his uncle, Porus the Younger also ruled a territory within the Punjab region of South Asia. The realm of Porus the Younger was located between the Irāvatī (Hydraōtēs) and Asikni (Akesinēs) rivers, and it corresponded to the easternmost part of the old Gandhāra Mahājanapada.

== Sources ==
- Raychaudhuri, Hemchandra (1953). Political History of Ancient India: From the Accession of Parikshit to the Extinction of Gupta Dynasty. University of Calcutta.
