= Aaj Ki Raat (Stree 2 song) =

2024 song performed by Madhubanti Bagchi and Divya Kumar

- Song cover

Song by Madhubanti Bagchi and Divya Kumar

from the album Stree 2
- Language: Hindi
- Released: 24 July 2024
- Recorded: 2023
- Length: 3:48
- Label: Saregama
- Composer: Sachin–Jigar
- Lyricist: Amitabh Bhattacharya

Music video
- "Aaj Ki Raat" on YouTube

"Aaj Ki Raat" (transl. Tonight) is a Hindi-language song composed by Sachin–Jigar, lyrics written by Amitabh Bhattacharya, sung by Madhubanti Bagchi and Divya Kumar, for the soundtrack album of 2024 film Stree 2. It was picturised on Tamannaah Bhatia. The song received a positive reception becoming one of the most popular songs of the year. The song peaked at #1 on Billboard India, #2 on UK Asian charts and #65 on Billboard Global 200.

== Composition and release ==
Sung by Madhubanti Bagchi and Divya Kumar, the lyrics for the song were written by Amitabh Bhattacharya, the music was composed by Sachin–Jigar and the choreography was done by Vijay Ganguly. The song was shot on Bhatia's birthday in the 5 degree temperature.

The song was released on 24 July 2024.

== Reception ==
A critic, Joginder Tuteja of Bollywood Hungama said that "No wonder, Sachin–Jigar and Amitabh Bhattacharya hit a six with the very first song, "Aaj Ki Raat". This one is a unique composition for sure since it has everything from a ghazal feel to the lounge setting with even an item number vibe to it, something which may have been really tough to pull off but comes across as rather effortless here." ETV Bharat calling the song "alluring" said "Tamannaah Bhatia dances with irresistible charm." It further said that "the song is bound to get the audiences moving and ready to hit the dance floor immediately."

"Aaj Ki Raat" peaked at #1 on Billboard India for consecutive thirteen weeks through 18 August 2024 to 16 November 2024. The song peaked at #2 on UK Asian charts dated 27 September 2024. The song entered the Billboard Global 200 at the 65th position on 14 September 2024. On MENA Chart, the song peaked at #19 in the week of September 2024.

== Accolades ==
Year	Award	Song	Singer	Film	Title	Result	Ref.
2025	69th Filmfare Awards	"Aaj ki Raat"	Madhubanti Bagchi	Stree 2	Best Female Playback Singer	Won	

== Other versions ==
The song was recreated in Bengali as "Aaj Aei Raat," featuring vocals by Ujjaini Mukherjee and Ishaan Mitra, with lyrics written by Somraj Das and Amitabh Bhattacharya. A Marathi version, titled "Aajchi Ratra," was released on 18 December 2024, by Saregama Marathi, sung by Vaishali Samant.
