= Nikhil Nagesh Bhat =

Indian filmmaker

- Notable work: Kill (2023)

Nikhil Nagesh Bhat is an Indian filmmaker and writer who predominantly works in the Hindi film industry. He is known for directing the action thriller films Kill and Apurva.

== Early life ==
Nikhil was born in Patna, Bihar and later moved to Pune, Maharashtra for his studies.

== Career ==
His personal experience during a train journey between Patna and Pune in the mid-1990s, during which the train he was on was robbed, influenced his storytelling. This traumatic event was the foundation for the plot of Kill, which he began writing in 2016.

== Filmography ==
Year	Title	Notes
2009	Saluun	Credited as Nikhil Bhat
2018	Brij Mohan Amar Rahe	
2020	Rasbhari	Web series
2020	The Gone Game	Web series
2022	Hurdang	
2023	Kill	Premiered at the Toronto International Film Festival on 7 September 2023; theatrically released in India on 5 July 2024
2023	Apurva	
TBA	Deadlocked	Filming
