= Filmfare Award for Best Male Debut =

Annual award for performance in Hindi-language film

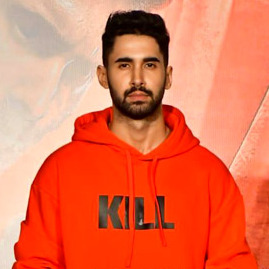
- The 2025 recipient: Lakshya Lalwani for Kill
- Awarded for: Best Debut Performance by an Actor
- Country: India
- Presented by: Filmfare
- First award: Aamir Khan, Qayamat Se Qayamat Tak (1989)
- Currently held by: Lakshya Lalwani, Kill (2025)
- Website: Filmfare winners

The Filmfare Award for Best Male Debut is given by Filmfare as part of its annual Filmfare Awards for Hindi films to recognize outstanding performance by a male actor in a debut role.

== List of winners ==
=== 1980s ===
Year	Images	Actor	Movie	Role
1989		Aamir Khan	Qayamat Se Qayamat Tak	Rajveer "Raj" Singh

=== 1990s ===
Year	Images	Actor	Movie	Role
1990		Salman Khan	Maine Pyar Kiya	Prem Choudhary
1991		Rahul Roy	Aashiqui	Rahul
1992		Ajay Devgn	Phool Aur Kaante	Ajay Salgaonkar
1993		Shah Rukh Khan	Deewana	Raja Sahai
1994		Saif Ali Khan	Aashiq Awara	Jaidev "Jai" Singh/Jimmy/Rakesh Rajpal
1995	Not Awarded			
1996		Bobby Deol	Barsaat	Badal
1997		Chandrachur Singh	Maachis	Kripal Singh a.k.a. Pali
1998		Akshaye Khanna	Himalay Putra	Abhay Khanna
1998		Akshaye Khanna	Border	Dharmvir Singh Bhan
1999		Fardeen Khan	Prem Aggan	Suraj Singh

=== 2000s ===
Year	Image	Actor	Movie	Role
2000		Rahul Khanna	1947: Earth	Hassan
2001		Hrithik Roshan	Kaho Naa... Pyaar Hai	Rohit Kumar, Raj Chopra
2002		Tusshar Kapoor	Mujhe Kucch Kehna Hai	Karan Sharma
2003		Vivek Oberoi	Company	Chandrakant "Chandu" Nagre
2003		Vivek Oberoi	Saathiya	Aditya Sehgal
2004		Shahid Kapoor	Ishq Vishk	Rajiv Mathur
2005	Not Awarded			
2006		Shiney Ahuja	Hazaaron Khwaishein Aisi	Vikram Malhotra
2007	Not Awarded			
2008		Ranbir Kapoor	Saawariya	Ranbir Raj
2009		Farhan Akhtar	Rock On!!	Aditya Shroff (Adi)
2009		Imran Khan	Jaane Tu... Ya Jaane Na	Jai "Ratz" Singh Rathore a.k.a. Ratz & Mowgli

=== 2010s ===
Year	Images	Actor	Movie	Role
2010	Not Awarded			
2011		Ranveer Singh	Band Baaja Baaraat	Bittoo Sharma
2012		Vidyut Jammwal	Force	Vishnu Reddy
2013		Ayushmann Khurrana	Vicky Donor	Vikram "Vicky" Arora a.k.a. Vicky Donor
2014		Dhanush	Raanjhanaa	Kundan Shankar
2015		Fawad Khan	Khoobsurat	Yuvraj Vikram Singh Rathore
2016		Sooraj Pancholi	Hero	Sooraj Kaushik
2017		Diljit Dosanjh	Udta Punjab	ASI Sartaj Singh
2018	Not Awarded			
2019		Ishaan Khatter	Beyond the Clouds	Amir Ahmed

=== 2020s ===
Year	Images	Actor	Movie	Role
2020		Abhimanyu Dassani	Mard Ko Dard Nahi Hota	Suryaanshu "Surya" Sampat
2021	"Not awarded"			
2022		Ehan Bhat	99 Songs	Jay
2023		Ankush Gedam	Jhund	Ankush Masram aka Don
2024		Aditya Rawal	Faraaz	Nibraas
2025		Lakshya Lalwani	Kill	Amrit Rathod

== See also ==
- Filmfare Award for Best Female Debut
- Filmfare Awards
- Bollywood
