= Apurva (2023 film) =

2023 Indian film directed by Nikhil Bhat

- Official release poster
- Directed by: Nikhil Nagesh Bhat
- Written by: Nikhil Nagesh Bhat
- Produced by: Murad Khetani
- Starring: Tara Sutaria
- Cinematography: Anshuman Mahaley
- Edited by: Shivkumar V. Panicker
- Music by: Songs: Vishal Mishra; Score: Ketan Sodha
- Production companies: Star Studios; Cine1 Studios Production
- Distributed by: Disney+ Hotstar
- Release date: 15 November 2023
- Running time: 95 minutes
- Country: India
- Language: Hindi

Apurva is a 2023 Indian Hindi-language survival thriller film written and directed by Nikhil Nagesh Bhat and produced by Murad Khetani. It stars Tara Sutaria in the eponymous role alongside Rajpal Yadav, Abhishek Banerjee and Dhairya Karwa. Set in Chambal, the film follows an ordinary woman who faces extraordinary circumstances and will do anything to survive.

The film was released on Disney+ Hotstar on 15 November 2023 to mixed reviews from critics.

== Plot ==
In a rural area, a car is ambushed by a gang of four men—Jugnu, Sukha, Balli, and Chota—who kill its occupants and loot their jewellery. Planning their next target, the gang sets their sights on a nearby truck. Meanwhile, Apurva Kashyap, a young woman, travels by bus to surprise her fiancé, Siddharth “Sid.” When the bus driver refuses to yield to Jugnu's car, the gang escalates the situation, killing the driver and conductor. During a phone call between Apurva and Sid, Sukha argues with Sid, ultimately deciding to abduct Apurva.

The gang takes Apurva to an abandoned village, where Chota threatens her. In a moment of desperation, Apurva pushes him away, but Chota retaliates, knocking her unconscious. An astrologer, Tara Chand, soon arrives and is also captured by the gang. Regaining consciousness, Apurva escapes with Tara, who becomes her ally.

As they try to evade capture, Apurva confronts and kills Chota in self-defense. Blaming Tara for Chota’s death, the gang hunts him down, eventually killing him while Apurva narrowly escapes. She manages to call Sid on Tara's phone, informing him of the gang’s identities, but is left to survive alone until morning as the police advise Sid to wait to intervene.

Balli soon discovers Apurva and attempts to sexually assault her. Pretending to submit, she seizes an opportunity to overpower and stab him. Jugnu and Sukha, finding Balli gravely injured, continue their pursuit. Apurva lures Jugnu into a well, pushing him in and killing him, and later dispatches the injured Balli.

In a final confrontation, Apurva attempts to run down Sukha with a stolen car, but a crash leads to a struggle near a railway. Overpowered, Apurva finally pushes Sukha away, who expresses a twisted desire to marry her. In a decisive moment, Apurva kills Sukha and seeks refuge in a nearby railway crossing cabin, where she manages to contact Sid, ending her night of survival.

== Cast ==
- Tara Sutaria as Apurva Kashyap
- Rajpal Yadav as Jugnu
- Abhishek Banerjee as Sukha
- Dhairya Karwa as Siddharth "Sid", Apurva's fiancé
- Sumit Gulati as Balli
- Aaditya Gupta as Chhota
- Rakesh Chaturvedi Om as Astrologer Tara Chand
- Navni Parihar as Apurva's Mother
- Rajesh Jais as Apurva's Father
- Geeta Modi as Siddharth's Mother
- Vinod Sharma as Siddharth's Father
- Gagan Bhasin as Sub-inspector
- Aashish Dubey as Rajiv
- Madhvendra Jha as Insp. Manohar

== Production ==
Principal photography commenced in October 2022. Production wrapped in December 2022. The title role was originally offered to Kiara Advani, however, she rejected it, deeming it "a major risk in her career at this point".

== Music ==
Apurva

Soundtrack album by Vishal Mishra
- Released: 20 November 2023
- Recorded: 2022
- Genre: Feature film soundtrack
- Length: 10:03
- Language: Hindi
- Label: Zee Music Company
External audio
- Apurva - Full Album on YouTube

The film’s music was composed by Vishal Mishra, with lyrics by Mishra and Kaushal Kishore. The soundtrack, distributed by Zee Music Company, consists of three original tracks: "Diwali", "Hai Khuda" and "Tujhse Pyaar Hai"—all of which were released as singles leading up to and coinciding with the film’s release.

Track listing
No.	Title	Lyrics	Singer(s)	Length
1.	"Diwali"	Vishal Mishra, Kaushal Kishore	Vishal Mishra	3:20
2.	"Hai Khuda"	Vishal Mishra, Kaushal Kishore	Vishal Mishra	3:40
3.	"Tujhse Pyaar Hai"	Vishal Mishra	Vishal Mishra	3:03
Total length:				10:03

== Release ==
The film was released on the streaming platform, Disney+ Hotstar on 15 November 2023.

== Reception ==
=== Critical response ===
Apurva received mixed reviews from critics. On the review aggregator website Rotten Tomatoes, 17% of 6 critics' reviews are positive, with an average rating of 6/10.

Dhaval Roy of Times of India rated the film 3.5/5 and wrote, "If your are looking for a movie that thrills, shocks and makes you hold your breath, this one's definitely for you as it ticks these boxes. Watch out for the ultimate face off between Apurva and one of the antagonists!" Writing for The Indian Express, Alaka Sahani wrote "had the makers of Apurva not harboured the ambition of being gritty and realistic, this probably would have come close to being a ‘slasher’ movie". A critic from Bollywood Hungama rated the film 3/5 stars and wrote "Apurva is a well-made gripping thriller."

Hindustan Times's Prannay Pathak wrote, "Despite the unappetising lingering over the lead character’s body and the gratuitous violence punctuating the goings-on, Apurva never scares you or makes your skin crawl". Despite otherwise disliking the film, Deepa Gahlot of Rediff.com opined, "If at all the film does anything, it is to offer Tara Sutaria a role that allows her to act, rather than just dress up and play pretty love interest to the leading man".

In a scathing review for Film Companion, Rahul Desai reviewed, "Apurva is predictable, tasteless and frighteningly dull, ticking genre boxes because they're cool and not because there's a story to be told". Rohit Bhatnagar of The Free Press Journal had a similar take stating, "Nagesh, although creates a world that is close to reality sans newness. Anushka Sharma’s NH10, and Imtiaz Ali’s Highway had similar tone, vibe, and atmosphere, a way better screenplay for that matter, Apurva looks stale in every aspect".

=== Viewership ===
Apurva garnered 4,800,000 views in its initial week of debut on Disney+ Hotstar, securing the fourth position among the most-watched Indian content across all streaming platforms during the same week.
