= Filmfare Award for Best Action =

Award for hindi-films

- Awarded for: Best Performance by an Action Director
- Country: India
- Presented by: Filmfare
- First award: Tinnu Verma, Khuda Gawah (1993)
- Currently held by: Oh Sea Young and Parvez Shaikh; Kill (2025)
- Website: Filmfare Awards

The Filmfare Best Action Award is given by the Filmfare magazine as part of its annual Filmfare Awards for Hindi films.

Although the overall awards started in 1954, the award in this category started in 1993.

== Superlatives ==
| Wins | Recipient |
|---|---|
| 5 | Sham Kaushal |
| 4 | Tinu Verma |
| 3 | Allan Amin, Sunil Rodrigues |
| 2 | Bhiku Verma, Akbar Bakshi, Vijayan, Tom Struthers, Parvez Shaikh |

== Awards ==
Here is a list of the award winners and the films for which they won.

| Year | Action Director | Film |
|---|---|---|
| 2025 | Oh Sea Young and Parvez Shaikh | Kill |
| 2024 | Spiro Razatos, Anal Arasu, Craig Macrae, Yannick Ben, Kecha Khamphakdee, and Sunil Rodrigues | Jawan |
| 2023 | Parvez Shaikh | Vikram Vedha |
| 2022 | Stefan Richter, Sunil Rodrigues | Shershaah |
| 2021 | Ramazan Bulut, R. P. Yadav | Tanhaji |
| 2020 | Paul Jennings, Oh Sea Young, Parvez Shaikh and Franz Spilhaus | War |
| 2019 | Vikram Dahiya & Sunil Rodrigues | Mukkabaaz |
| 2018 | Thomas Struthers | Tiger Zinda Hai |
| 2017 | Sham Kaushal | Dangal |
| 2016 | Sham Kaushal | Bajirao Mastani |
| 2015 | Sham Kaushal | Gunday |
| 2014 | Thomas Struthers & Guru Bachchan | D-Day |
| 2013 | Sham Kaushal | Gangs of Wasseypur |
| 2012 | Matthias Barsch | Don 2 |
| 2011 | Vijayan | Dabangg |
| 2010 | Vijayan | Wanted |
| 2009 | Peter Hein | Ghajini |
| 2008 | Rob Miller | Chak De India |
| 2007 | Tony Ching Siu-tung & Sham Kaushal | Krrish |
| 2006 | Allan Amin | Dus |
| 2005 | Vikram Dharma | Yuva |
| 2004 | Allan Amin | Qayamat: City Under Threat |
| 2003 | Philip Ko & Abbas Ali Moghal | Awara Paagal Deewana |
| 2002 | Tinnu Verma | Gadar: Ek Prem Katha |
| 2001 | Allan Amin | Mission Kashmir |
| 2000 | Tinnu Verma | Arjun Pandit |
| 1999 | Akbar Bakshi | Soldier |
| 1998 | Bhiku Verma & Tinnu Verma | Border |
| 1997 | Akbar Bakshi | Khiladiyon Ka Khiladi |
| 1996 | Bhiku Verma | Karan Arjun |
| 1995 | Ravi Dewan | Anth |
| 1994 | Tyagarjan | Gardish |
| 1993 | Tinnu Verma | Khuda Gawah |

== See also ==
- Filmfare Awards
- Bollywood
- Cinema of India
