= Filmfare Award for Best Editing =

Annual award for Hindi films

- Awarded for: Best performance by an editor
- Country: India
- Presented by: Filmfare
- First award: Hrishikesh Mukherjee, Naukari (1955)
- Currently held by: Shivkumar V. Panicker, Kill (2025)
- Website: Filmfare Awards

The Filmfare Best Editing Award is an award given by India's Filmfare magazine as part of its annual Filmfare Awards for Hindi films.

== Multiple wins ==
Wins	Editor
4	A. Sreekar Prasad
3	Hrishikesh Mukherjee, Raj Kapoor, Sanjay Verma
2	G.G. Mayekar, B. S. Glaad, Kamlakar Karkhanis, Keshav Naidu, M. S. Shinde, Renu Saluja, V. N. Mayekar, Namrata Rao, Shivkumar V. Panicker

== List ==
Year	Editor	Film
2025	Shivkumar V. Panicker	Kill
2024	Jaskunwar Kohli and Vidhu Vinod Chopra	12th Fail
2023	Ninad Khanolkar	An Action Hero
2022	A. Sreekar Prasad	Shershaah
2021	Yasha Ramchandani	Thappad
2020	Shivkumar V. Panicker	Uri: The Surgical Strike
2019	Pooja Ladha Surti	Andhadhun
2018	Nitin Baid	Trapped
2017	Monisha R Baldawa	Neerja
2016	A. Sreekar Prasad	Talvar
2015	Abhijit Kokate & Anurag Kashyap	Queen
2014	Aarif Sheikh	D-Day
2013	Namrata Rao	Kahaani
2012	Huzefa Lokhandwala	Delhi Belly
2011	Namrata Rao	Love Sex aur Dhokha
2010	A. Sreekar Prasad	Firaaq
2009	Amit Pawar	Mumbai Meri Jaan
2008	Amitabh Shukla	Chak De India
2007	P. S. Bharati	Rang de Basanti
2006	Bela Sehgal	Black
2005	Rameshwar S. Bhagat	Dhoom
2004	Shimit Amin	Bhoot
2003	Chandan Arora	Company
2002	A. Sreekar Prasad	Dil Chahta Hai
2001	Sanjay Verma	Kaho Naa... Pyaar Hai
2000	Jethu Mundul	Sarfarosh
1999	Apurva Asrani, Bhanodaya	Satya
1998	Rajiv Rai	Gupt: The Hidden Truth
1997	V. N. Mayekar	Ghatak: Lethal
1996	Sanjay Varma	Karan Arjun
1995	Renu Saluja	1942: A Love Story
1994	Gopalakrishnan	Gardish
1993	Zafar Sultan, Dilip Katalgi	Jo Jeeta Wohi Sikandar
1992	Waman Bhonsle, Gurudutt Shirali	Saudagar
1991	V. N. Mayekar	Ghayal
1990	Renu Saluja	Parinda
1989	Sanjay Varma	Khoon Bhari Maang
1987 & 1988: No Ceremony Held
1986	Raj Kapoor	Ram Teri Ganga Maili
1985	M. S. Shinde	Sohni Mahiwal
1984	Keshav Naidu	Vijeta
1983	Raj Kapoor	Prem Rog
1982	N. R. Kitoo	Ek Duuje Ke Liye
1981	S. V. Mane	Insaaf Ka Tarazu
1980	Bhanudas Divakar	Junoon
1979	B. Prasad	Badalte Rishte
1978	Kamlakar Karkhanis	Amar Akbar Anthony
1977	Bijoy Chowdhury	Balika Badhu
1976	M. S. Shinde	Sholay
1975	Kamlakar Karkhanis	Roti
1974	R. Mahadik	Zanjeer
1973	Manoj Kumar	Shor
1972	Hrishikesh Mukherjee	Anand
1971	Vijay Anand	Johnny Mera Naam
1970	B. S. Glaad	Nanha Farishta
1969	N. M. Shankar	Saathi
1968	B. S. Glaad	Upkar
1967	Vasant Borkar	Phool Aur Patthar
1966	Pratap Dave	Himalaya Ki God Mein
1965	Raj Kapoor	Sangam
1964	Pran Mehra	Gumrah
1963	Keshav Nanda	Bees Saal Baad
1962	G.G. Mayekar	Jis Desh Mein Ganga Behti Hai
1961	Moosa Mansoor	Kohinoor
1960	Chintaman Borkar	Navrang
1959	Hrishikesh Mukherjee	Madhumati
1958	Shivaji Avadhut	Sharada
1957	G. G. Mayekar	Shree 420
1956	Hrishikesh Mukherjee	Naukari

== See also ==
- Filmfare Award's
- Bollywood
- Cinema of India
