= Mitraz =

Indian Music Duo

Mitraz is a music duo from Gorakhpur in India, consisting of Anmol Aashish and Pratik Singh, known for their work in Indie Music and Bollywood. Their debut Bollywood song Akhiyaan Gulaab from Teri Baaton Mein Aisa Uljha Jiya entered Billboard charts in March 2024. On 4 September 2024, Pratik announced he will be leaving Mitraz to pursue another career. Their musical style has been described as pop and R&B.

== Career ==
Mitraz came into the limelight after their song Junoon from Loop Beats Records gained 100+ Million plays on overall streaming Platforms.
