= Madhubanti Bagchi =

Indian playback singer

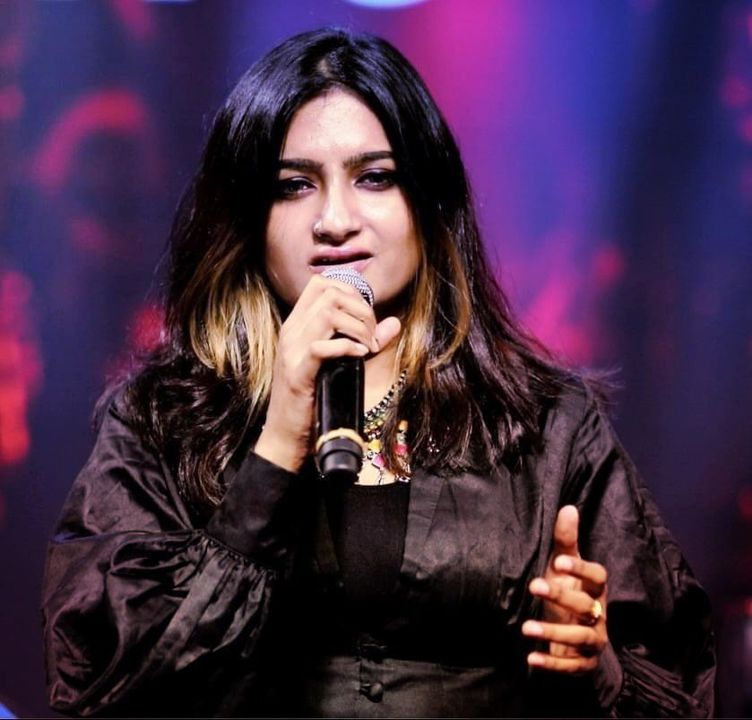
- Bagchi in 2024
- Born: Balurghat, West Bengal, India
- Occupations: Singer; composer; musician
- Years active: 2013–present
- Musical career
- Genres: Hindustani classical music; Filmi Bollywood
- Instrument: Vocals

Madhubanti Bagchi is an Indian playback singer and composer. Trained in the Agra Gharana tradition, she works primarily in Bollywood.

== Early life and training ==
Madhubanti was born into a Bengali Brahmin family in Balurghat, West Bengal, India. She began her formal musical education early in childhood, training in the third standard under the noted Agra gharana exponent Shrimati Subhra Guha. Her classical foundation strongly influences her contemporary playback style, especially her work in semi–classical and emotive genres.

Before her playback debut, she was a member of the Bengali band Mrittika.

== Music Career ==
Bagchi became active in Bollywood in the 2010s. She has recorded for leading Bollywood composers including Pritam, Amit Trivedi, Sachin–Jigar, Debojyoti Mishra, Sanjay Leela Bhansali, Shekhar Ravjiani and Shantanu Moitra. Her notable Hindi film songs include tracks from Uunchai (2022), Doctor G (2022), Good Luck Jerry (2022), Hum Do Hamare Do (2021), Laxmii (2020), Love Aaj Kal (2020), Stree 2 (2024) and Heeramandi (2024).

She has also worked in the Bengali film industry, contributing to films such as Kuler Achaar (2022), Boudi Canteen (2022), Shah Jahan Regency (2019), Ahare Mon (2018), Shob Bhooturey (2017), Gangster (2016), Shudhu Tomari Jonyo (2015) and Ami Aar Amar Girlfriends (2013).

In 2022, she appeared on Coke Studio Bangla. Her song "Aaj Ki Raat" from Stree 2 crossed 2 billion YouTube views.

== Filmography ==
| Year | Film | Role | Notes | Ref. |
|---|---|---|---|---|
| 2025 | Dhurandhar | Singer at wedding | appears in the song "Shararat" | |

== Accolades ==
| Year | Award | Song | Film | Title | Result | Ref. |
|---|---|---|---|---|---|---|
| 2025 | 69th Filmfare Awards | "Aaj ki Raat" | Stree 2 | Best Female Playback Singer | Won | |
