= 23rd IIFA Awards =

Bollywood film awards

- Date: 26–27 May 2023
- Site: Etihad Arena, Abu Dhabi, United Arab Emirates
- Hosted by: Abhishek Bachchan; Vicky Kaushal
- Official website: iifa.com/iifa-2023

Highlights
- Best Picture: Drishyam 2
- Best Direction: R. Madhavan (Rocketry: The Nambi Effect)
- Best Actor: Hrithik Roshan (Vikram Vedha)
- Best Actress: Alia Bhatt (Gangubai Kathiawadi)

Television coverage
- Channel: Colors TV
- Network: Viacom18

The 23rd International Indian Film Academy Awards, also known as the IIFA, was held on 26–27 May 2023, postponed from the original February date. The awards were once again held in Abu Dhabi, United Arab Emirates. The nominees were announced in December 2022. The ceremony was broadcast by Colors TV on 18 June.

Brahmāstra: Part One – Shiva led the ceremony with 9 nominations, followed by Gangubai Kathiawadi with 7 nominations and Bhool Bhulaiyaa 2 with 5 nominations.

Brahmāstra: Part One – Shiva won 6 awards, including Best Supporting Actress (for Mouni Roy), thus becoming the most-awarded film at the ceremony.

== Awards ==
=== Main awards ===
The winners and nominees have been listed below. Winners are listed first, highlighted in boldface, and indicated with a double dagger (‡).

Best Film	Best Director
**Drishyam 2** ‡; Bhool Bhulaiyaa 2; Darlings; Gangubai Kathiawadi; Vikram Vedha	**R. Madhavan – Rocketry: The Nambi Effect** ‡; Anees Bazmee – Bhool Bhulaiyaa 2; Ayan Mukerji – Brahmāstra: Part One – Shiva; Jasmeet K. Reen – Darlings; Sanjay Leela Bhansali – Gangubai Kathiawadi; Vasan Bala – Monica, O My Darling
Best Actor	Best Actress
**Hrithik Roshan – Vikram Vedha as Vedha Betal** ‡; Abhishek Bachchan – Dasvi as Ganga Ram Chaudhary; Ajay Devgn – Drishyam 2 as Vijay Salgaonkar; Anupam Kher – The Kashmir Files as Pushkar Nath Pandit; Kartik Aaryan – Bhool Bhulaiyaa 2 as Ruhaan Randhawa a.k.a. Rooh Baba; Rajkummar Rao – Monica, O My Darling as Jayant "Johnny" Arkhedkar	**Alia Bhatt – Gangubai Kathiawadi as Gangubai Kathiawadi** ‡; Alia Bhatt – Darlings as Badrunissa "Badru" Sheikh; Shefali Shah – Darlings as Shamshunissa "Shamshu" Ansari; Tabu – Bhool Bhulaiyaa 2 as Anjulika Chatterjee / Manjulika Chatterjee; Yami Gautam – A Thursday as Naina Jaiswal
Best Supporting Actor	Best Supporting Actress
**Anil Kapoor – Jugjugg Jeeyo as Bheem Saini** ‡; Abhishek Banerjee – Bhediya as Janardan "Jana" / JD; Shah Rukh Khan – Brahmāstra: Part One – Shiva as Mohan Bhargav; Sikandar Kher – Monica, O My Darling as Nishikant Adhikari; Vijay Raaz – Gangubai Kathiawadi as Raziabai	**Mouni Roy – Brahmāstra: Part One – Shiva as Junoon** ‡; Nimrat Kaur – Dasvi as Bimla Devi "Bimmo" Chaudhary; Radhika Apte – Monica, O My Darling as ACP Vijayashanti Naidu; Sheeba Chadha – Badhaai Do as Mrs. Thakur; Tabu – Drishyam 2 as Meera Deshmukh
Best Debut – Male	Best Debut – Female
**Shantanu Maheshwari – Gangubai Kathiawadi as Afsaan Badr-ur-Razzaq** ‡; **Babil Khan – Qala as Jagan** ‡	**Khushalii Kumar – Dhokha: Round D Corner as Saanchi Sinha** ‡
Best Music Director	Best Lyricist
**Pritam – Brahmāstra: Part One – Shiva** ‡; OAFF and Savera – Gehraiyaan; Pritam – Bhool Bhulaiyaa 2; Sanjay Leela Bhansali – Gangubai Kathiawadi; Tanishk Bagchi, Pozy, Niranjan Dhar, Kanishk Seth and Vishal Shelke – Jugjugg Jeeyo	**Amitabh Bhattacharya – "Kesariya" – Brahmāstra: Part One – Shiva** ‡; A. M. Turaz – "Jab Saiyaan" – Gangubai Kathiawadi; Ankur Tewari – "Gehraiyaan" – Gehraiyaan; Raj Shekhar – "Behney Do" – Rocketry: The Nambi Effect; Varun Grover – "Atak Gaya Hai" – Badhaai Do
Best Male Playback Singer	Best Female Playback Singer
**Arijit Singh – "Kesariya" – Brahmāstra: Part One – Shiva** ‡; Aditya Rao – "Behney Do" – Rocketry: The Nambi Effect; Arijit Singh – "Deva Deva" – Brahmāstra: Part One – Shiva; Kanishk Seth – "Rangisari" – Jugjugg Jeeyo; Mohit Chauhan – "Gehraiyaan (Reprise)" – Gehraiyaan	**Shreya Ghoshal – "Rasiya" – Brahmāstra: Part One – Shiva** ‡; Jonita Gandhi – "Deva Deva" – Brahmāstra: Part One – Shiva; Kavita Seth – "Rangisari" – Jugjugg Jeeyo; Lothika Jha – "Doobey" – Gehraiyaan; Shreya Ghoshal – "Jab Saiyaan" – Gangubai Kathiawadi

=== Technical awards ===
Best Story (Original)	Best Story (Adapted)
Jasmeet K Reen, Parveez Sheikh – Darlings	**Aamil Keeyan Khan**, Abhishek Pathak – Drishyam 2
Best Screenplay	Best Dialogue
Sanjay Leela Bhansali, Utkarshini Vashishtha – Gangubai Kathiawadi	**Utkarshini Vashishtha, Prakash Kapadia – Gangubai Kathiawadi**
Best Cinematography	Best Editing
Sudeep Chatterjee – Gangubai Kathiawadi	**Sandeep Francis – Drishyam 2**
Best Background Score	Best Choreography
Sam C. S. – Vikram Vedha	**Bosco–Caesar – "Bhool Bhulaiyaa (Title Track)" – Bhool Bhulaiyaa 2**
Best Sound Mixing	Best Sound Design
Gunjan Augustine Sah, Boloy Kumar Doloi, Rahul Karpe – Monica, O My Darling	**Mandar Kulkarni – Bhool Bhulaiyaa 2**
Best Special Effects
DNEG & Redefine – Brahmāstra: Part One – Shiva

== Superlatives ==
Films with multiple nominations
Nominations	Film
9	Brahmāstra: Part One – Shiva
7	Gangubai Kathiawadi
5	Bhool Bhulaiyaa 2
4	Darlings
4	Gehraiyaan
4	Jugjugg Jeeyo
4	Monica, O My Darling
3	Drishyam 2
2	Badhaai Do
2	Dasvi
2	Vikram Vedha

Films with multiple awards
Awards	Film
6	Brahmāstra: Part One – Shiva
5	Gangubai Kathiawadi
3	Drishyam 2
2	Bhool Bhulaiyaa 2
2	Vikram Vedha
