= Zee Cine Award for Best Playback Singer – Female =

Film award in India

Zee Cine Awards for Best Female Playback Singer
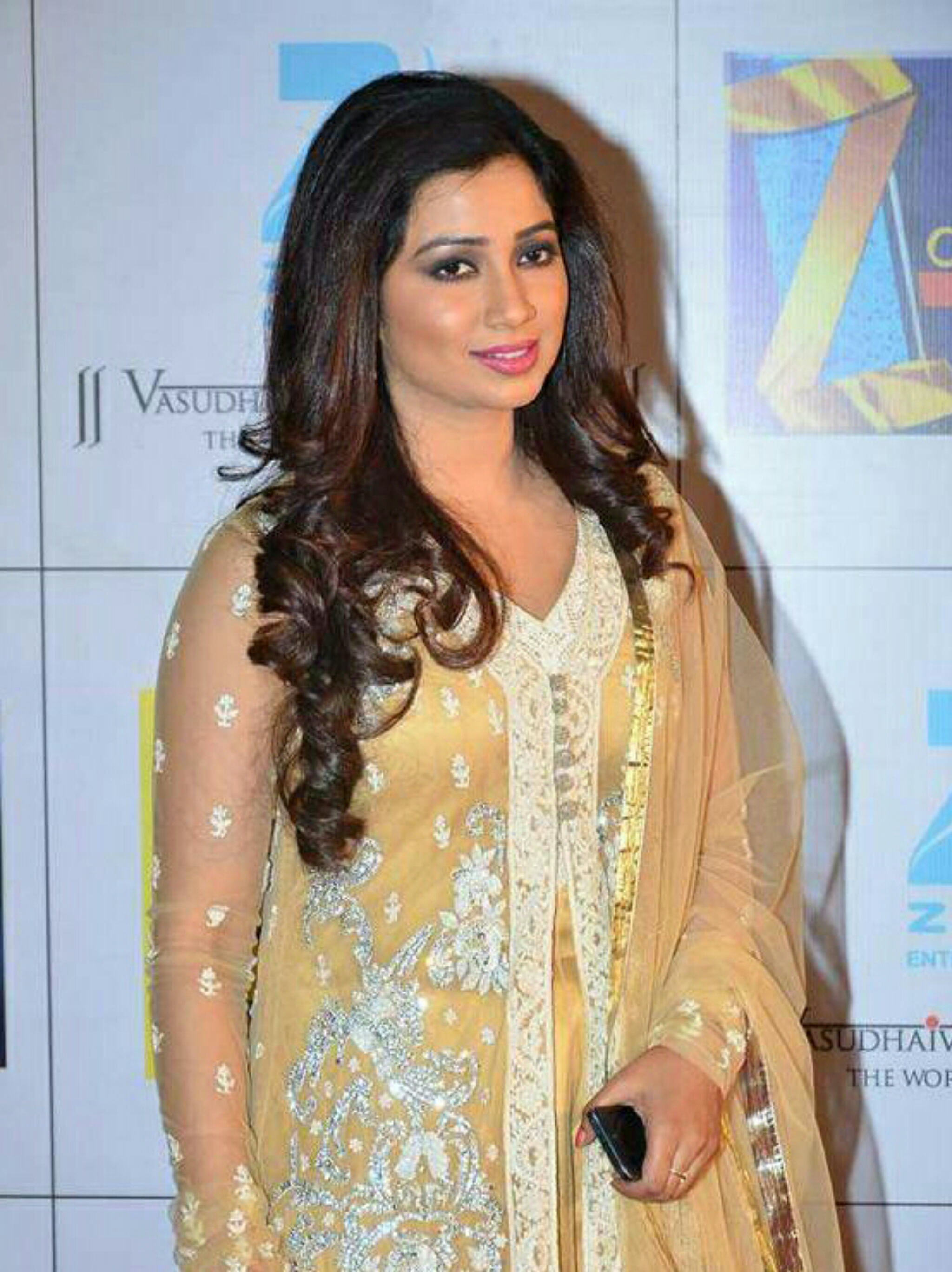
- The 2026 recipient: Shreya Ghoshal
- Awarded for: Best Performance by a Female Playback Singer
- Country: India
- Presented by: Zee
- First award: Lata Mangeshkar, "Dil to Pagal Hai"; Dil to Pagal Hai (1998)
- Currently held by: Shreya Ghoshal, "Saiyaara Reprisal"; Saiyaara (2026)

The Zee Cine Award Best Playback Singer – Female is awarded to a female playback singer who works in the Hindi film industry. The winner is selected from a shortlist by a jury, and announced at the annual Zee Cine Awards ceremony.

== List of nominees and winners ==
=== 1990s ===
Year	Singer	Song	Movie
1998
1998	Lata Mangeshkar	Dil To Pagal Hai	Dil To Pagal Hai
1998	Kavita Krishnamurthy	I Love My India	Pardes
1998	Asha Bhosle	Le Gayi	Dil To Pagal Hai
1998	Poornima	Sona Kitna Sona Hai	Hero No. 1
1999
1999	Alka Yagnik	Kuch Kuch Hota Hai	Kuch Kuch Hota Hai
1999	Alka Yagnik	Chamma Chamma	China Gate
1999	Alka Yagnik	Mere Mehboob Mere Sanam	Duplicate
1999	Alka Yagnik	Odh Li Chunariya	Pyaar Kiya To Darna Kya
1999	Sapna Awasthi	Chaiyya Chaiyya	Dil Se..

=== 2000s ===
Year	Singer	Song	Movie
2000
2000	Kavita Krishnamurthy	Nimbooda	Hum Dil De Chuke Sanam
2000	Alka Yagnik	Taal Se Taal Mila	Taal
2000	Asha Bhosle	Rang De	Thakshak
2000	Kavita Krishnamurthy	Mhare Hiwda	Hum Saath-Saath Hain
2000	Kavita Krishnamurthy	Ishq Bina	Taal
2001
2001	Alka Yagnik	Kaho Naa... Pyaar Hai	Kaho Naa... Pyaar Hai
2002
2002	Asha Bhosle	Radha Kaise Na Jale	Lagaan
2003
2003	Kavita Krishnamurthy	Dola Re Dola	Devdas
2003	Shreya Ghoshal	Dola Re Dola	Devdas
2003	Kavita Krishnamurthy	Maar Dala	Devdas
2003	Asha Bhosle	Khallas	Company
2003	Sunidhi Chauhan	Ishq Samundar	Kaante
2003	Sunidhi Chauhan	Dil Mein Jaagi Dhadkan	Sur – The Melody of Life
2004
2004	Sadhana Sargam	Kuch Naa Kaho	Kuch Naa Kaho
2004	Shreya Ghoshal	Jaadu Hai Nasha Hai	Jism
2004	Alka Yagnik	Odhni	Tere Naam
2005
2005	Sunidhi Chauhan	Dhoom Machale	Dhoom
2005	Sunidhi Chauhan	Aisa Jadoo Daala Re	Khakee
2005	Sunidhi Chauhan	Ishq Kabhi Kario	Musafir
2005	Sadhana Sargam	Aao Na	Kyun! Ho Gaya Na...
2005	Reena Bharadwaz	Yeh Rishta	Meenaxi
2006
2006	Shreya Ghoshal	Piyu Bole	Parineeta
2006	Alka Yagnik	Kyon Ki Itna	Kyon Ki
2006	Sunidhi Chauhan	Kaisi Paheli	Parineeta
2006	Asha Bhosle	Huzoore Ala	Page 3
2006	Alisha Chinai	Kajra Re	Bunty Aur Babli
2007
2007	Alka Yagnik	Tumhi Dekho Naa	Kabhi Alvida Na Kehna
2007	Shreya Ghoshal	So Jaoon Main	Woh Lamhe
2007	Sunidhi Chauhan	Beedi Jalaile	Omkara
2007	Anushka Manchanda	Golmaal	Golmaal
2007	Vasundhara Das	Where's The Party Tonight?	Kabhi Alvida Na Kehna
2008
2008	Shreya Ghoshal	Barso Re	Guru
2008	Shreya Ghoshal	Yeh Ishq Haye	Jab We Met
2008	Shreya Ghoshal	Salaam-e-Ishq	Salaam-e-Ishq
2008	Sadhana Sargam	Salaam-e-Ishq	Salaam-e-Ishq
2008	Mahalakshmi Iyer	Bolna Halke	Jhoom Barabar Jhoom
2008	Sunidhi Chauhan	Sajnaji Vaari Vaari	Honeymoon Travels Pvt. Ltd.
2009
2009	No Award Given		

=== 2010s ===
Year	Singer	Song	Movie
2010
2010	No Award Given		
2011
2011	Richa Sharma	Sajda	My Name Is Khan
2011	Shreya Ghoshal	Chori Kiya Re Jiya	Dabangg
2012
2012	Shreya Ghoshal	Saibo	Shor in the City
2012	Shreya Ghoshal	Ooh Laa La	The Dirty Picture
2012	Shreya Ghoshal	Teri Meri	Bodyguard
2013
2013	Shreya Ghoshal	Saans	Jab Tak Hai Jaan
2013	Shreya Ghoshal	Radha	Student of the Year
2014
2014	Shreya Ghoshal	Sunn Raha Hai	Aashiqui 2
2014	Monali Thakur	Sawar loon	Lootera
2015
2015	No Award Given		
2016
2016	Shreya Ghoshal	Mohe Rang Do Laal	Bajirao Mastani
2016	Shreya Ghoshal	Deewani Mastani	Bajirao Mastani
2016	Shreya Ghoshal	Pinga	Bajirao Mastani
2016	Vaishali Mhade	Pinga	Bajirao Mastani
2016	Monali Thakur	Moh Moh Ke Dhaage	Dum Laga Ke Haisha
2017
2017	Neha Bhasin	Jag Ghoomeya	Sultan
2018
2018	Jyotica Tangri	Pallo Latke	Shaadi Mein Zaroor Aana
2018	Meghna Mishra	Nachdi Phira	Secret Superstar
2018	Shreya Ghoshal	Thodi Der	Half Girlfriend
2019
2019	Harshdeep Kaur	Dilbaro	Raazi
2019	Vibha Saraf	Dilbaro	Raazi
2019	Asees Kaur	Akh Lad Jaave	Loveyatri
2019	Neha Kakkar	Aankh Maarey	Simmba
2019	Neha Kakkar & Dhvani Bhanushali	Dilbar	Satyameva Jayate
2019	Shreya Ghoshal	Dhadak	Dhadak
2019	Shreya Ghoshal	Ghoomar	Padmaavat

=== 2020s ===
Year	Singer	Song	Movie
2020
2020	Shreya Ghoshal & Vaishali Mhade	Ghar More Pardesiya	Kalank
2020	Neha Kakkar	"The Hook Up Song"	Student of the Year 2
2020	Parampara Thakur	Mere Sohneya	Kabir Singh
2020	Parampara Thakur	"Pal Pal Dil Ke Paas"	Pal Pal Dil Ke Paas
2020	Shilpa Rao	Ghungroo	War
2020	Asees Kaur & Lisa Mishra	"Chandigarh Mein"	Good Newwz
2021	NO CEREMONY		
2022	NO CEREMONY		
2023
2023	Kavita Seth	Rangisari	Jugjugg Jeeyo
2023	Lothika Jha	"Gehraiyaan Title Track"	Gehraiyaan
2023	Anupama Chakraborty Shrivastava	"Yeh Ek Zindagi"	Monica, O My Darling
2023	Sireesha Bhagavatula	"Ghodey Pe Sawaar"	Qala
2023	Shilpa Rao	"Tere Hawaale"	Laal Singh Chaddha
2023	Janhvi Shrimankar	"Dholida"	Gangubai Kathiawadi
2024
2024	Shilpa Rao	Besharam Rang	Pathaan
2025
2025	Madhubanti Bagchi	Aaj Ki Raat	Stree 2
2026
2026	Shreya Ghoshal	Saiyaara Reprise - Female	Saiyaara
2026	Nikhita Gandhi	"Aavan Jaavan"	War 2
2026	Neha Kakkar	"Bol Kaffara Kya Hoga"	Ek Deewane Ki Deewaniyat
2026	Madhubanti Bagchi	"Uyi Amma"	Azaad
2026	Madhubanti Bagchi & Jasmine Sandlas	"Shararat"	Dhurandhar

== See also ==
- Zee Cine Awards
- Hindi cinema
- Cinema of India
- List of music awards honoring women
