= IIFA Award for Best Female Playback Singer =

International Indian Film Academy Award

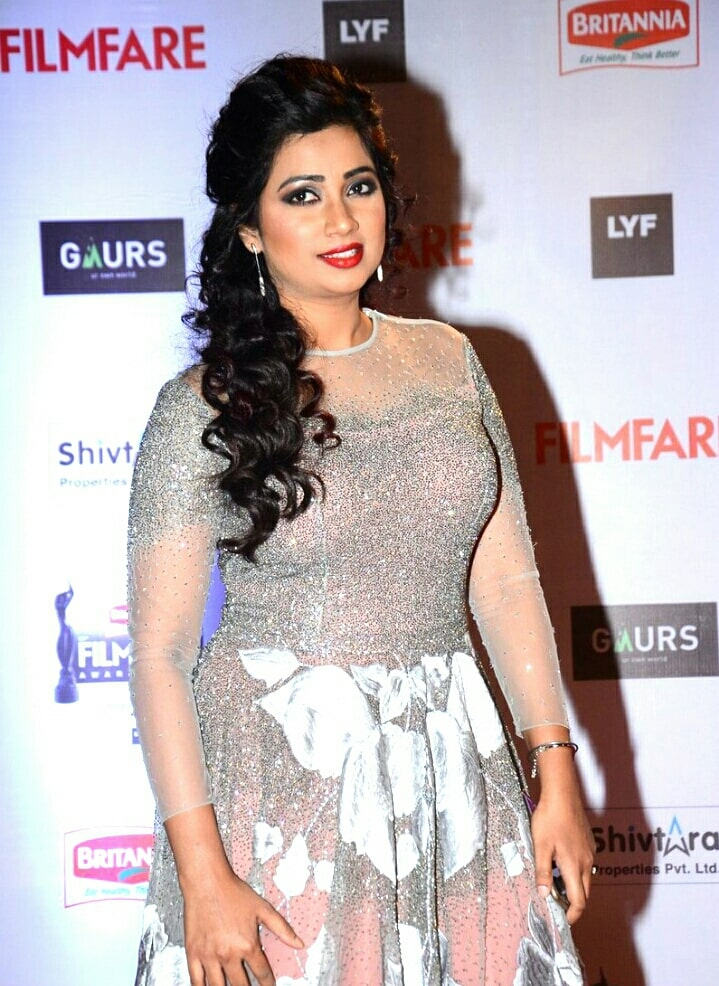
- The 2026 Recipient: Shreya Ghoshal
- Awarded for: Best Performance by a Female Playback Singer
- Country: India
- Presented by: International Indian Film Academy
- First award: Alka Yagnik, "Taal Se Taal"; Taal (2000)
- Currently held by: Shreya Ghoshal, "Saiyaara (Reprise – Female)"; Saiyaara (2026)
- Website: IIFA Awards

The IIFA Award for Best Female Playback Singer is given by the International Indian Film Academy as part of its annual award ceremony for Hindi films, to recognise a female playback singer who has delivered an outstanding vocal performance in a film song. The winner is chosen by viewers, and is announced at the annual ceremony. Shreya Ghoshal holds the record for most wins in this category (11). Ghoshal also holds the record for most nominations (30).

The first recipient of the award was Alka Yagnik, who was honoured at the 1st IIFA Awards in the year 2000. The most recent recipient of the award is Shreya Ghoshal, who was honoured at the 26th IIFA Awards in the year 2026.

== Superlatives ==
| Superlative | Singer | Record |
|---|---|---|
| Most awards | Shreya Ghoshal | 11 |
| Most nominations | Shreya Ghoshal | 30 |
| Most consecutive wins | Shreya Ghoshal (2012-2014) | 3 |
| Most consecutive nominations | Shreya Ghoshal (2006-2016) | 17 |
| Most wins in a decade | Shreya Ghoshal (2000s & 2020s) | 4 |
| Most nominations in a single year | Shreya Ghoshal (2008) | 4 |
| Youngest winner | Meghna Mishra (2018) | 16 |
| Youngest nominee | Sunidhi Chauhan (2001) | 18 |
| Oldest winner | Asha Bhosle (2002) | 69 |
| Oldest nominee | Lata Mangeshkar (2007) | 78 |
| Most nominations without ever winning | Rekha Bhardwaj | 4 |

Award was introduced in 2000 and records after 2000 till date are as follows.

- Shreya Ghoshal is the most awarded singer in this category with eleven wins, followed by Alka Yagnik, Sunidhi Chauhan and Kanika Kapoor, who each have two wins. Ghoshal is also the singer with the most consecutive wins with three (2012–2014).
- Ghoshal is the singer who received the most nominations in a single year, with being nominated for four songs in a single year (2008). She also holds the record of getting nominated for consecutively 11 years from 2006 till 2016, resulting in 17 nominations and 5 wins. Additionally, with 30 nominations, she is the most nominated singer in this category.

=== Most Wins ===
| Winner | Number of Wins | Years |
|---|---|---|
| Shreya Ghoshal | 11 | 2003, 2004, 2008, 2009, 2012, 2013, 2014, 2020, 2023, 2025, 2026 |
| Alka Yagnik | 2 | 2000, 2001 |
| Sunidhi Chauhan | 2 | 2005, 2007 |
| Kanika Kapoor | 2 | 2015, 2017 |

=== Multiple Nominees ===
| Rank | Singer | Number of nominations | Number of wins |
|---|---|---|---|
| 1 | Shreya Ghoshal | 30 | 11 |
| 2 | Sunidhi Chauhan | 17 | 2 |
| 3 | Alka Yagnik | 15 | 2 |

== List of Winners ==
† - indicates the performance also won the Filmfare Award
‡ - indicates the performance was also nominated for the Filmfare Award

=== 2000s ===
| Year | Singer | Song | Movie |
|---|---|---|---|
2000 (1st)
| 2000 (1st) | Alka Yagnik † | Taal Se Taal | Taal |
2001 (2nd)
| 2001 (2nd) | Alka Yagnik | Kaho Naa Pyaar Hai | Kaho Naa... Pyaar Hai |
| 2001 (2nd) | Alka Yagnik † | Dil Ne Yeh Kaha | Dhadkan |
| 2001 (2nd) | Kavita Krishnamurthy | Aey Dil Laya Hai Bahar | Kya Kehna |
| 2001 (2nd) | Preeti & Pinky ‡ | Piya Piya | Har Dil Jo Pyar Karega |
| 2001 (2nd) | Sunidhi Chauhan ‡ | Mehboob Mere | Fiza |
2002 (3rd)
| 2002 (3rd) | Asha Bhosle | Radha Kaisa Na Jale | Lagaan |
| 2002 (3rd) | Alka Yagnik ‡ | Jaane Kyun | Dil Chahta Hai |
| 2002 (3rd) | Alka Yagnik | Bole Chudiyan | Kabhi Khushi Kabhie Gham |
| 2002 (3rd) | Alka Yagnik | Suraj Hua Maddham | Kabhi Khushi Kabhie Gham |
| 2002 (3rd) | Lata Mangeshkar | So Gaye Hain | Zubeidaa |
2003 (4th)
| 2003 (4th) | Kavita Krishnamurthy † | Dola Re Dola | Devdas |
| 2003 (4th) | Shreya Ghoshal † | Dola Re Dola | Devdas |
| 2003 (4th) | Alka Yagnik | Sanam Mere Humraaz | Humraaz |
| 2003 (4th) | Alka Yagnik | Aapke Pyaar Mein Hum | Raaz |
| 2003 (4th) | Richa Sharma | Maahi Ve | Kaante |
| 2003 (4th) | Shreya Ghoshal | Silsila Ye Chahat Ka | Devdas |
2004 (5th)
| 2004 (5th) | Shreya Ghoshal † | Jaadu Hai Nasha Hai | Jism |
| 2004 (5th) | Alka Yagnik | Kal Ho Naa Ho (Sad Version) | Kal Ho Naa Ho |
| 2004 (5th) | Alka Yagnik | Seemaaye Bulaaye | LOC Kargil |
| 2004 (5th) | Alka Yagnik ‡ | Oodhni | Tere Naam |
| 2004 (5th) | Sunidhi Chauhan | Dekhle Aankhon Mein Aankhien Daal | Munna Bhai M.B.B.S. |
2005 (6th)
| 2005 (6th) | Sunidhi Chauhan ‡ | Dhoom Machale | Dhoom |
| 2005 (6th) | Alka Yagnik | Aankhen Bandh Karke | Aitraaz |
| 2005 (6th) | Alka Yagnik † | Hum Tum | Hum Tum |
| 2005 (6th) | Alka Yagnik ‡ | Lal Dupatta | Mujhse Shaadi Karogi |
| 2005 (6th) | Sunidhi Chauhan | Sajna Ve | Chameli |
2006 (7th)
| 2006 (7th) | Alisha Chinai † | Kajra Re | Bunty Aur Babli |
| 2006 (7th) | Kavita Krishnamurthy | Main Vaari Vaari | Mangal Pandey: The Rising |
| 2006 (7th) | Shreya Ghoshal ‡ | Piyu Bole | Parineeta |
| 2006 (7th) | Sunidhi Chauhan ‡ | Deedar De | Dus |
| 2006 (7th) | Sunidhi Chauhan ‡ | Kaisi Paheli | Parineeta |
2007 (8th)
| 2007 (8th) | Sunidhi Chauhan † | Beedi | Omkara |
| 2007 (8th) | Alka Yagnik ‡ | Kabhi Alvida Naa Kehna | Kabhi Alvida Naa Kehna |
| 2007 (8th) | Lata Mangeshkar | Luka Chhupi | Rang De Basanti |
| 2007 (8th) | Shreya Ghoshal ‡ | Pal Pal | Lage Raho Munnabhai |
| 2007 (8th) | Sunidhi Chauhan | Crazy Kiya Re | Dhoom 2 |
2008 (9th)
| 2008 (9th) | Shreya Ghoshal † | Barso Re | Guru |
| 2008 (9th) | Shreya Ghoshal | Dholna | Bhool Bhulaiyaa |
| 2008 (9th) | Shreya Ghoshal | Thode Badmaash | Saawariya |
| 2008 (9th) | Shreya Ghoshal ‡ | Ye Ishq Haye | Jab We Met |
| 2008 (9th) | Sunidhi Chauhan ‡ | Aaja Nachle | Aaja Nachle |
2009 (10th)
| 2009 (10th) | Shreya Ghoshal † | Teri Ore | Singh Is Kinng |
| 2009 (10th) | Bela Shende | Man Mohana | Jodhaa Akbar |
| 2009 (10th) | Monali Thakur | Zara Zara Touch Me | Race |
| 2009 (10th) | Shilpa Rao ‡ | Khuda Jaane | Bachna Ae Haseeno |
| 2009 (10th) | Sunidhi Chauhan | Desi Girl | Dostana |

=== 2010s ===
| Year | Singer | Song | Movie |
|---|---|---|---|
2010 (11th)
| 2010 (11th) | Kavita Seth † | Iktara | Wake Up Sid |
| 2010 (11th) | Rekha Bhardwaj † | Sasural Genda Phool | Delhi-6 |
| 2010 (11th) | Shilpa Rao ‡ | Mudi Mudi | Paa |
| 2010 (11th) | Shreya Ghoshal ‡ | Zoobi Doobi | 3 Idiots |
| 2010 (11th) | Sunidhi Chauhan ‡ | Chor Baazari | Love Aaj Kal |
| 2010 (11th) | Tulsi Kumar | Haafiz Khuda | 8 x 10 Tasveer |
2011 (12th)
| 2011 (12th) | Mamta Sharma † | Munni Badnaam Hui | Dabangg |
| 2011 (12th) | Rekha Bhardwaj | Ab Mujhey Koi | Ishqiya |
| 2011 (12th) | Shreya Ghoshal ‡ | Bahara | I Hate Luv Storys |
| 2011 (12th) | Sunidhi Chauhan ‡ | Ainvayi Ainvayi | Band Baaja Baaraat |
| 2011 (12th) | Sunidhi Chauhan † | Sheila Ki Jawani | Tees Maar Khan |
2012 (13th)
| 2012 (13th) | Shreya Ghoshal ‡ | Teri Meri | Bodyguard |
| 2012 (13th) | Harshdeep Kaur ‡ | Katiya Karun | Rockstar |
| 2012 (13th) | Shreya Ghoshal | Ooh La La | The Dirty Picture |
| 2012 (13th) | Sunidhi Chauhan | Te Amo | Dum Maaro Dum |
| 2012 (13th) | Usha Uthup and Rekha Bhardwaj † | Darling | 7 Khoon Maaf |
2013 (14th)
| 2013 (14th) | Shreya Ghoshal ‡ | Chikni Chameli | Agneepath |
| 2013 (14th) | Kavita Seth ‡ | Tumhi Ho Bandhu | Cocktail |
| 2013 (14th) | Rekha Bhardwaj | Phir Le Aya Dil | Barfi! |
| 2013 (14th) | Shalmali Kholgade † | Pareshaan | Ishaqzaade |
| 2013 (14th) | Shreya Ghoshal | Aashiyan | Barfi! |
2014 (15th)
| 2014 (15th) | Shreya Ghoshal ‡ | Sunn Raha Hai | Aashiqui 2 |
| 2014 (15th) | Bhoomi Trivedi | Ram Chahe Leela | Goliyon Ki Raasleela Ram-Leela |
| 2014 (15th) | Monali Thakur † | Sawaar Loon | Lootera |
| 2014 (15th) | Shreya Ghoshal | O Rangrez | Bhaag Milkha Bhaag |
2015 (16th)
| 2015 (16th) | Kanika Kapoor † | Baby Doll | Ragini MMS 2 |
| 2015 (16th) | Jyoti Nooran and Sultana Nooran ‡ | Patakha Guddi | Highway |
| 2015 (16th) | Shreya Ghoshal | Samjhawan | Humpty Sharma Ki Dulhania |
2016 (17th)
| 2016 (17th) | Monali Thakur ‡ | Moh Moh Ke Dhaage | Dum Laga Ke Haisha |
| 2016 (17th) | Kanika Kapoor | Chittiyaan Kalaiyaan | Roy |
| 2016 (17th) | Shreya Ghoshal † | Deewani Mastani | Bajirao Mastani |
| 2016 (17th) | Sunidhi Chauhan | Girls Like To Swing | Dil Dhadakne Do |
2017 (18th)
| 2017 (18th) | Tulsi Kumar | Soch Na Sake | Airlift |
| 2017 (18th) | Kanika Kapoor ‡ | Da Da Dasse | Udta Punjab |
| 2017 (18th) | Neha Bhasin † | Jag Ghoomeya | Sultan |
2018 (19th)
| 2018 (19th) | Meghna Mishra † | Main Kaun Hoon | Secret Superstar |
2019 (20th)
| 2019 (20th) | Harshdeep Kaur ‡ | Dilbaro | Raazi |
| 2019 (20th) | Vibha Saraf ‡ | Dilbaro | Raazi |
| 2019 (20th) | Shreya Ghoshal † | Ghoomar | Padmaavat |
| 2019 (20th) | Sunidhi Chauhan ‡ | Ae Watan | Raazi |
| 2019 (20th) | Sunidhi Chauhan | Main Badhiya Tu Bhi Badhiya | Sanju |
| 2019 (20th) | Tulsi Kumar | Paniyon Sa | Satyameva Jayate |

=== 2020s ===
| Year | Singer | Song | Movie |
|---|---|---|---|
2020 (21st)
| 2020 (21st) | Shreya Ghoshal ‡ | Yeh Aaina | Kabir Singh |
| 2020 (21st) | Aakanksha Sharma | Naina Yeh | Article 15 |
| 2020 (21st) | Jasleen Royal | Jahan Tu Chala | Gully Boy |
| 2020 (21st) | Vibha Saraf | Kab Se Kab Tak | Gully Boy |
| 2020 (21st) | Shilpa Rao † | Ghungroo | War |
| 2021 | AWARDS NOT HELD DUE TO COVID-19 PANDEMIC | | |
2022 (22nd)
| 2022 (22nd) | Asees Kaur † | Rataan Lambiya | Shershaah |
| 2022 (22nd) | Jasleen Royal | Ranjha | Shershaah |
| 2022 (22nd) | Priya Saraiya | Kalle Kalle | Chandigarh Kare Aashiqui |
| 2022 (22nd) | Shreya Ghoshal ‡ | Chaka Chak | Atrangi Re |
| 2022 (22nd) | Shreya Ghoshal ‡ | Param Sundari | Mimi |
2023 (23rd)
| 2023 (23rd) | Shreya Ghoshal | Rasiya | Brahmāstra: Part One – Shiva |
| 2023 (23rd) | Jonita Gandhi ‡ | Deva Deva | Brahmāstra: Part One – Shiva |
| 2023 (23rd) | Kavita Seth † | Rangisari | Jugjugg Jeeyo |
| 2023 (23rd) | Lothika Jha | Doobey | Gehraiyaan |
| 2023 (23rd) | Shreya Ghoshal ‡ | Jab Saiyaan | Gangubai Kathiawadi |
2024 (24th)
| 2024 (24th) | Shilpa Rao ‡ | Chaleya | Jawan |
| 2024 (24th) | Deepthi Suresh ‡ | Aararaari Raaro | Jawan |
| 2024 (24th) | Shilpa Rao † | Besharam Rang | Pathaan |
| 2024 (24th) | Shreya Ghoshal | Kashmir | Animal |
| 2024 (24th) | Shreya Ghoshal ‡ | Tum Kya Mile | Rocky Aur Rani Kii Prem Kahaani |
2025 (25th)
| 2025 (25th) | Shreya Ghoshal | Ami Je Tomar 3.0 | Bhool Bhulaiyaa 3 |
| 2025 (25th) | Madhubanti Bagchi † | Aaj Ki Raat | Stree 2 |
| 2025 (25th) | Rekha Bhardwaj ‡ | Nikat | Kill |
| 2025 (25th) | Shilpa Rao ‡ | Ishq Jaisa Kuch | Fighter |
| 2025 (25th) | Shreya Ghoshal ‡ | Dheeme Dheeme | Laapataa Ladies |
2026 (26th)
| 2026 (26th) | Shreya Ghoshal | Saiyaara (Reprise – Female) | Saiyaara |

== See also ==
- List of music awards honoring women
- IIFA Award for Best Male Playback
- IIFA Awards
