= Vishal Shelke =

Indian music composer and singer

- Born: India
- Genres: Pop, film score, Indian classical music
- Occupations: Music composer, singer
- Years active: 2017–present
- Labels: Zee Music Company, T-Series

Vishal Shelke is an Indian music composer and singer who works primarily in the Hindi film industry. He composed the song Nain Ta Heere for the film Jugjugg Jeeyo (2022), for which he received a nomination for Music Direction at the International Indian Film Academy Awards. His other works include the singles Manjogi, Meethi Boliyaan, and Manbaware.

== Early life and education ==
Vishal is trained in Hindustani classical music under Pt. Chandrakant Limaye, Ustad Azeem Khan, and Pt. JayehChandra Mishra from Patiala gharana. He later studied music production at the KM Music Conservatory in Chennai, an institute founded by A. R. Rahman.

== Career ==
Vishal began his career composing for short films and advertising jingles. His early credits include the background scores for short films such as The Beginning (2017) and Chaska (2018). He gained mainstream recognition in 2022 after composing the romantic track Nain Ta Heere for Dharma Productions' Jugjugg Jeeyo. The song, which features vocals by Guru Randhawa and Asees Kaur, was originally composed in 2019 and intended for the film Good Newwz before being repurposed for Jugjugg Jeeyo. The track was a commercial success, appearing on various music charts and earning Vishal a nomination for Music Direction at the 23rd IIFA Awards.

In 2024, Vishal composed the song Manbaware for the Marathi film Kanni. He served as the music director for the 2025 sequel Mastiii 4 and the film Bhabiji Ghar Par Hain – Fun on the Run, a cinematic adaptation of the SAB TV sitcom Bhabiji Ghar Par Hain!. The latter is scheduled for a theatrical release on 6 February 2026. He has also released several independent singles, including Hove Hove with Jubin Nautiyal and Meethi Boliyan with Javed Ali.

== Filmography ==
=== As composer ===
Year	Title	Language	Notes
2017	The Beginning	Hindi	Short film
2018	Chaska	Hindi	Short film; background score
2019	Parchhayee	Hindi	TV series
2022	Jugjugg Jeeyo	Hindi	Song: Nain Ta Heere
2024	Kanni	Marathi	Song: Manbaware
2025	Mastiii 4	Hindi	
2026	Bhabiji Ghar Par Hain – Fun on the Run	Hindi	Song: Manjogi

== Awards and nominations ==
Year	Award	Category	Work	Result
2023	International Indian Film Academy Awards	Best Music Direction	Jugjugg Jeeyo	Nominated
2023	News18 Reel Movie Awards	Best Music Direction	Jugjugg Jeeyo	Nominated
