= Rangisari =

Indian Hindi-language song

Single by Kanishk Seth and Kavita Seth

from the album Jugjugg Jeeyo
- Language: Hindi
- Released: 6 June 2022
- Recorded: 2022
- Genre: Dance; Classical music
- Length: 3:43
- Label: T-Series
- Composers: Kanishk Seth and Kavita Seth
- Lyricist: Traditional
- Producer: Kanishk Seth

Music video
- "Rangisari" on YouTube

"Rangisari" (transl. Colourful scarf) is an Indian Hindi-language song from the soundtrack album of Jugjugg Jeeyo. The song is a re-release song "Rangi Saari" by Kavita Seth and Kanishk Seth, recreated from the late classical vocalist Shobha Gurtu's popular thumri. It was released on 6 June 2022 as the second single from the album, through T-Series.

Upon release, the song received positive reviews by audience and critics and was trending on internet. Kavitha's vocal performance was praised by critics and audiences and she won the Zee Cine Award for Best Playback Singer – Female and Filmfare Award for Best Female Playback Singer.

== Production ==
"When we were re-working it for the film, we simply enhanced it a little further. When we first released it, it was received with so much love organically and with this movie, it will find a newer audience."

- Kavita Seth on the track.

Sung by Kavita Seth and recreated by her son Kanishk Seth, the song is contemporary version of late classical vocalist Shobha Gurtu's popular thumri. Earlier the song was supposed to use in the film Dhadak (2018), but the plan was dropped due to issues with music label. Later Azeem Dayani, music supervisor asked to use the song in Jugjugg Jeeyo.

For this one, we had a direct deal with Dharma and not [label] T-Series. I was majorly looking forward to sort out my contract legally first, because that’s really important. This was a very unique deal because the master that we made for it is different. This master is Dharma’s property but the original one is with us. My major concern was to make sure that the song was different, so that we retain the original one and the new one stays with the label.

— Kanishk Seth, on the composition of the track "Rangisari" in an interview with Rolling Stone.

== Release ==
On 31 May 2022, the film makers announced that the song would be released soon. On 3 June, they said that song will be released on 6 June. The second single titled "Rangisari" was released on 6 June 2022.

== Impact and reception ==
The song received positive reception from audiences, praising the music and lyrics. Ishita Singh of iDiva listed the song at Bollywood Songs That Are Perfect For Your Sangeet Night. Stuti Bhattacharya of iDiva noted "The only consolation is that there isn’t a lot of difference between the original and the ‘remade’ track, and the vocalists are also the same." Kavitha said "success of Rangi Saari made me realise you can’t achieve everything with money."

== Accolades ==
Award	Date of the ceremony	Category	Recipients	Result	Ref.
Zee Cine Awards	18 March 2023	Best Playback Singer – Female	Kavita Seth	Won	
Filmfare Awards	27 April 2023	Best Female Playback Singer	Kavita Seth	Won	
Filmfare Awards	27 April 2023	Best Choreography	Bosco–Caesar	Nominated	
International Indian Film Academy Awards	26 and 27 May 2023	Best Male Playback Singer	Kanishk Seth	Nominated	
International Indian Film Academy Awards	26 and 27 May 2023	Best Female Playback Singer	Kavita Seth	Nominated	
