= Ghungroo (song) =

2019 song by Vishal–Shekhar

- Official song cover

Single by Vishal–Shekhar

from the album War
- Language: Hindi
- Released: 5 September 2019
- Recorded: 2018–2019
- Studio: YRF Studios, Mumbai; Purple Haze Studio, New Delhi; Mastering World, Wales
- Genre: Dance; pop; Funk
- Length: 5:02
- Label: YRF Music
- Composer: Vishal–Shekhar
- Lyricist: Kumaar
- Producer: Yash Raj Films

War track listing
- 1. "Ghungroo"; 2. "Jai Jai Shivshankar"; 3. "War Theme"; 4. "Kabir's Theme"; 5. "Khalid's Theme"

Music video
- "Ghungroo" on YouTube

"Ghungroo" (transl. Dancing Bells) is an Indian Hindi-language song, composed by the duo Vishal-Shekhar (Vishal Dadlani and Shekhar Ravjiani), with lyrics written by Kumaar and recorded by Arijit Singh and Shilpa Rao for the soundtrack album of the 2019 Indian film War. It was released on 5 September 2019 as the first single from the album, through YRF Music.

The song was also released in Tamil as "Salangaigal" and in Telugu as "Gunde Lo Thootlu Pade". The hook step dance involving Hrithik Roshan became popular. The song amassed over 467 million views on YouTube as of March 2025.

== Composition ==
"Ghungroo" was composed by the duo Vishal-Shekhar. The song was recorded by Abhay Rumde, mixed by Vijay Dayal and mastered by Donal Whelan. The song is arranged and programmed by Abhijit Nalani. Guitars were performed by Warren Mendonsa.

Lyrics of the song was written by Kumaar and recorded by Arijit Singh and Shilpa Rao.

== Music video ==
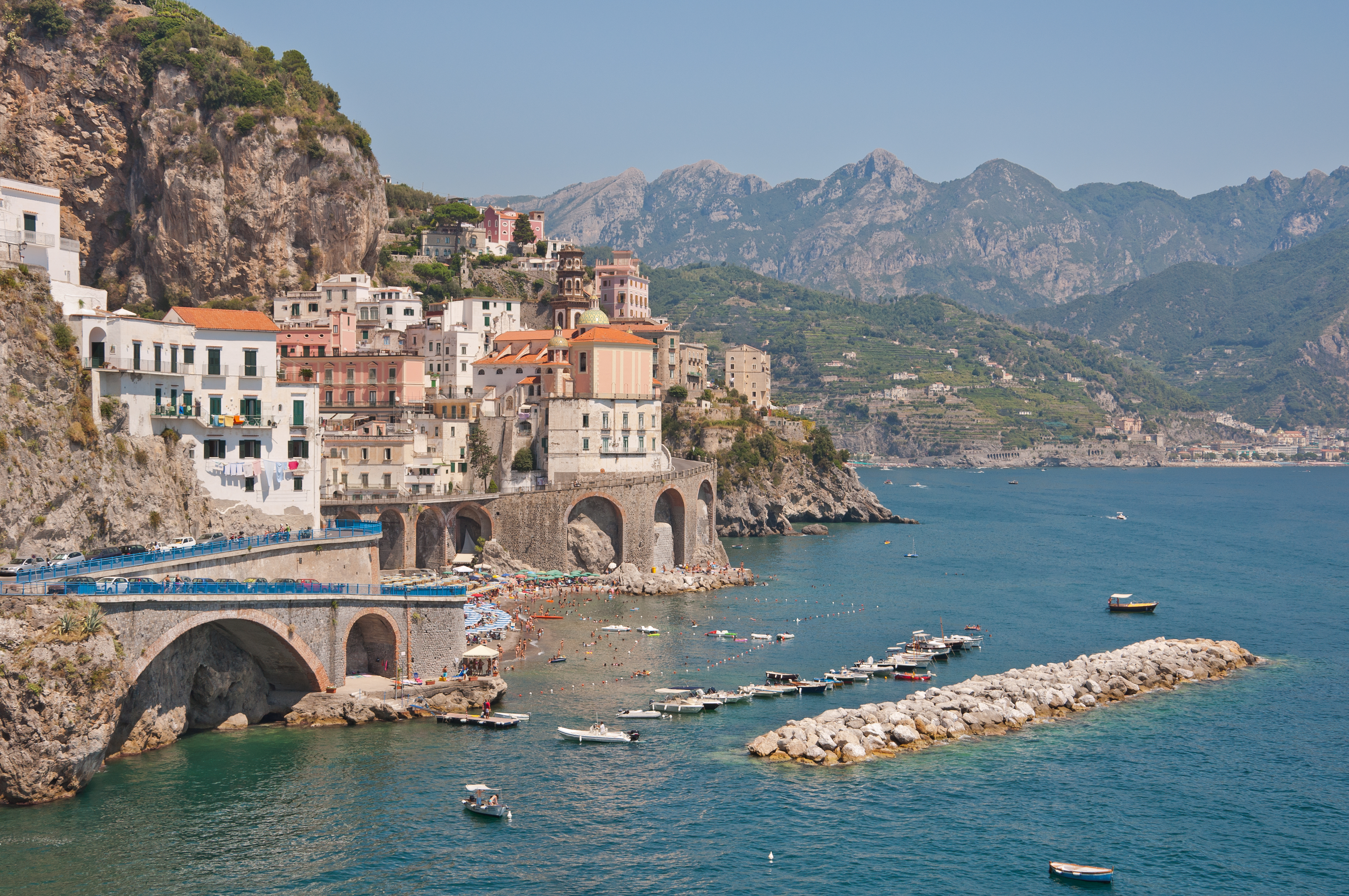
Part of "Ghungroo" was shot at the Amalfi Coast

Music video was choreographed by the duo Bosco–Caesar and Tushar Kalia. Music video features Hrithik Roshan and Vaani Kapoor dancing for the single. It was shot on Positano beach in Italy and Amalfi Coast. The music video featured about 150 dancers from Milan. The film crew reportedly had to shut down a portion of the Positano beach while filming. The rehearsals for the song went up to three months.

In an interview, Kalia said about rehearsals of Vaani Kapoor that "She got so many bruises, she fell so many times and it was bad. Physically, it was very challenging but she never gave up and she never skipped a single day of rehearsal. It is because of her dedication, commitment and hard work that the song has come out so well! I'm really proud of what she has done in the song. It's one of the most difficult songs I have ever choreographed. For the first time ever, an actress is attempting a routine that involves Cyr wheel and aerial rotating pole and both are very difficult routines to pull off even if you are a brilliant dancer."

== Reception ==
Bollywood Hungama wrote "both Hrithik and Vaani have proved their mantle with their swift dancing moves in their previous films, both have raised the bar really high in this foot-tapping dance number." The Indian Express wrote "Though fans might miss Hrithik’s unbelievable dance moves here, Vaani surely adds some spark with her acrobatics." India Today wrote "The video opens with a bikini-clad Vaani flaunting her hot bod, while Hrithik is seen watching her dance. Soon the Greek God joins the dancing diva and can be seen showing off his dance moves." Firstpost wrote "'Ghungroo' sees Hrithik's Kabir and Vaani's character traipsing around a secluded island, often breaking into dance in between." Hindustan Times wrote "Hrithik Roshan, Vaani Kapoor turn up the heat in this beachy, sunny number".

== Impact ==
The song received positive reception from audiences, praising the music and choreography. The hook step, performed by Roshan, went viral on social media. Roshan recreated the viral portion of the dance in the film's promotions. Tiger Shroff recreated the hook step. Nithiin and Rashmika Mandanna too recreated the step. Ananya Panday danced the step. Sanya Malhotra grooved the song.

== Credits and personnel ==
Credits adapted from YouTube.

- Vishal Dadlani – composer
- Shekhar Ravjiani – composer
- Kumaar – lyricist
- Arijit Singh – vocal
- Shilpa Rao – vocal
- Bosco–Caesar – Choreographer
- Tushar Kalia – Choreographer
- Vijay Dayal – mix
- Abhijit Nalani – programmer
- Warren Mendonsa – guitarist

== Accolades ==
Award (Note: Awards, festivals and organizations are in Alphabetical order.)	Date of ceremony (Note: Date is linked to the article about the awards held that year, wherever possible.)	Category	Recipient(s)	Result	Ref.
Filmfare Awards	15 February 2020	Best Female Playback Singer	Shilpa Rao ("Ghungroo")	Won	
Filmfare Awards	15 February 2020	Best Choreography	Bosco–Caesar & Tushar Kalia ("Ghungroo")	Nominated	
International Indian Film Academy Awards	27–29 November 2020	Best Male Playback Singer	Arijit Singh ("Ghungroo")	Nominated	
International Indian Film Academy Awards	27–29 November 2020	Best Female Playback Singer	Shilpa Rao ("Ghungroo")	Nominated	
International Indian Film Academy Awards	27–29 November 2020	Best Choreography	Bosco–Caesar & Tushar Kalia ("Ghungroo")	Won	
Mirchi Music Awards	19 February 2020	Song of The Year	"Ghungroo"	Nominated	
Mirchi Music Awards	19 February 2020	Female Vocalist of The Year	Shilpa Rao ("Ghungroo")	Nominated	
Mirchi Music Awards	19 February 2020	Song Engineer – Recording & Mixing	Abhay Rumde & Vijay Dayal ("Ghungroo")	Nominated	
Screen Awards	8 December 2019	Best Choreography	Bosco–Caesar; Tushar Kalia ("Ghungroo")	Won	
