= Double XL =

2022 Indian film by Satramm Ramani

- Theatrical release poster
- Directed by: Satramm Ramani
- Screenplay by: Sasha Singh; Mudassar Aziz
- Dialogues by: Mudassar Aziz
- Story by: Mudassar Aziz
- Produced by: Bhushan Kumar; Krishan Kumar; Vipul D. Shah; Ashwin Warde; Rajesh Bahl; Saqib Saleem; Huma Qureshi; Mudassar Aziz
- Starring: Sonakshi Sinha; Huma Qureshi; Zaheer Iqbal; Mahat Raghavendra
- Cinematography: Milind Jog
- Edited by: Abhishek Anand
- Music by: Songs: Sohail Sen; Kanishk Seth; Score: Sohail Sen
- Production companies: T-Series Films; Wakaoo Films; Elemen3 Entertainment; Reclining Seats Cinema
- Distributed by: AA Films
- Release date: 4 November 2022
- Running time: 128 minutes
- Country: India
- Language: Hindi
- Box office: est. ₹1.12 crore

Double XL is a 2022 Indian Hindi-language comedy film directed by Satramm Ramani. The film stars Sonakshi Sinha, Huma Qureshi, Zaheer Iqbal and Mahat Raghavendra (in his Hindi debut). The story revolves around two plus size women, one from the heartland of Uttar Pradesh and one from urban New Delhi, who discover themselves as they navigate life, celebrate female friendship and embrace body positivity, breaking the myth that beauty corresponds to size.

Double XL was released on 4 November 2022, and received negative reviews from critics.

== Plot ==
Rajshri Trivedi lives in Meerut with her parents and grandmother. Her mother wishes for her to get married, but she is constantly fat-shamed as "healthy." She aspires to become a Sports Presenter but her mother is against her wishes. On the other hand, there is Saira Khanna who lives in New Delhi and aspires to become a fashion designer and open her own fashion line, even though she is fat-shamed as "healthy." She has a boyfriend who is only after her money and gives her false hope that he will make her dream come true. One day, she surprises her boyfriend by coming to his house, only to find out that he is with another woman and is making love with her. Saira gets heartbroken. Soon after, Saira leaves him and goes to London. Meanwhile, Rajshri gets an offer as a sports presenter in London. Soon, after the turn of events, the two meet and share their life problems. They then decide to make their dreams come true and become successful.

== Cast ==
- Sonakshi Sinha as Saira Khanna
- Huma Qureshi as Rajshri Trivedi
- Zaheer Iqbal as Zorawar Rehmani
- Shobha Khote as Rajshri's grandmother
- Alka Kaushal as Rajshri's mother
- Kanwaljeet Singh as Rajshri's father
- Niki Aneja Walia as Zorawar's mother
- Danish Pandor as Viren
- Sachin Shroff as Saurabh Khanna, Saira's brother
- Jagat Rawat as Mausaji
- Mahat Raghavendra as Shrikant Shreevardhan
- Swati Tarar as Roli Mausi
- Dolly Singh as Meera
- Digvijay Singh as Ratan
- Isha Dhillon as Nidhi
- Seana Momsen as Roxanne
- Kay Eluvian as Cecile
- Shikhar Dhawan as himself (cameo appearance)
- Jimmy Sheirgill at Atul Chhabra (cameo appearance)
- Kapil Dev as himself (cameo appearance)

== Soundtrack ==
Double XL

Soundtrack album by Sohail Sen and Kanishk Seth
- Released: 1 November 2022
- Genre: Feature film soundtrack
- Length: 15:42
- Label: T-Series

Official audio
- Double XL - Full Album on YouTube

The music is composed by Sohail Sen and Kanishk Seth with lyrics written by Mudassar Aziz and Baba Bulle Shah.

Track listing
No.	Title	Lyrics	Music	Singer(s)	Length
1.	"Taali Taali"	Mudassar Aziz	Sohail Sen	Sohail Sen, Silambarasan, Rukhsar Bandhukia	3:54
2.	"Ki Jaana"	Mudassar Aziz, Baba Bulle Shah	Kanishk Seth	Kavita Seth, Kanishk Seth	4:41
3.	"Tumse Mila Doon"	Mudassar Aziz	Sohail Sen	Sohail Sen, Javed Ali	4:04
4.	"Rangeelo Manva"	Mudassar Aziz	Sohail Sen	Sohail Sen, Rekha Bhardwaj, Pratibha Singh Baghel, Shahid Mallya	3:04
Total length:					15:42

== Reception ==
On the review aggregator website Rotten Tomatoes, 11% of 9 critics' reviews are positive, with an average rating of 4.2/10.

The movie mostly received negative reviews. Shubhra Gupta for The Indian Express rate the movie 1.5/5 and wrote "Double XL is a massive opportunity wasted. Crashing pity." Saibal Chatterjee of NDTV also rated the movie 1.5/5 stars and wrote "Double XL, with its one-size-fits-all approach, translates into more than just double trouble." Anuj Kumar for The Hindu wrote "More of an essay on body-shaming than a piece of cinema, Double XL is yet another example of good intentions leading to a drab film. "The makers seem so focused on raising the issue and reflecting diversity on screen, that they seem to have forgotten that the noble idea needs to be packaged into a compelling story as well." Suchin Mehrotra for Hindustan Times wrote "Rounding off the group is London-based line producer Zorawar Khan (an unwatchable Zaheer Iqbal). A painfully animated Zaheer seems to be in his own movie entirely as Zorawar, or as he introduces himself - Zo Za Zoo. I wish I was joking." Tushar Joshi for India Today rated 2.5 out of 5 stars and wrote "The sentiment of the filmmaker is to encourage women to embrace their bodies irrespective of the size, frame, and to self-love to free themselves from the shackles of social stigma. Unfortunately, this task feels half-baked and a bit of a misfire in the attempt to give the film a tone of commercial acceptance." Nandini Ramnath of Scroll.in wrote "One of the high points in Double XL is when Rajshri’s mother (Alka Kaushal) shrieks at her: what was your dream, when did you have it and pray why?"
