= Kavish Seth =

- Born: 29 January 1992 (age 34)
- Genres: Indian classical music, Independent music
- Occupations: Poet, singer, songwriter & inventor
- Instrument: Noori
- Years active: 2014–present
- Website: kavishseth.com

Kavish Seth is an Indian poet, singer, songwriter and an inventor. The son of singer Kavita Seth, he has created his own musical instrument called Noori. Noori consists of 18 strings and is shaped like a guitar, but with a wooden frame covered in goatskin to produce percussive sound like a Djembe.

Seth released his first music video "Hindi Bole" in June 2023. He was recently awarded as the Most Talented Upcoming Musician by Piyush Goyal, and Devendra Fadnavis in the NavBharat Times award ceremony.

== Personal life ==
Seth is the son of singer Kavita Seth and the elder brother of singer and musician Kanishk Seth. He graduated from IIT Bombay in 2015. He has conceptualized Zubaan, a music project that aims to create platforms for collaboration between independent music artists from different corners of India. Chapters have started in Odisha, Varanasi, Deoria, Kausani, Khetri, Nagpur/ Wardha/ Gadchiroli, Mumbai, Kolkata where around 30 artists have been collaborating and performing all across the mainland.
