= Bosco–Caesar =

Indian choreographer duo

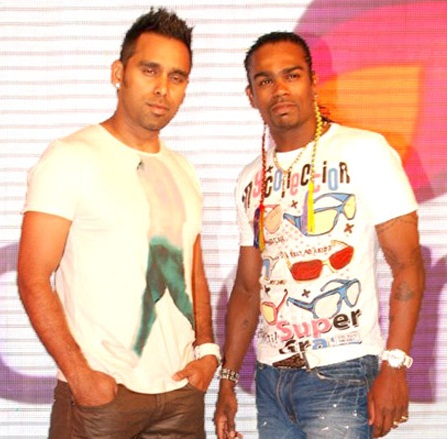
Bosco-Caesar in 2012

Bosco–Caesar is an Indian choreographer duo who work in Indian films. They are Bosco Martis and Caesar Gonsalves, who have together worked on 200 songs and about 75 films. They run the Bosco Caesar Dance Company in Brampton (Canada), Scarborough (Canada), Mumbai, Phoolbagan, and Salt Lake in Kolkata.

They won the 2011 (59th) National Film Award for Best Choreography for the "Señorita" in Zindagi Na Milegi Dobara, for which they also won the Filmfare Award for Best Choreography.

== Early life and education ==
Bosco Martis (born 23 November 1974) and Caesar Gonsalves (born 23 February 1973) grew up in Mumbai where they both went to St. Josephs in Juhu and played football together. Bosco was inspired by Caesar's dancing performances and practiced on his own to catch up with his future partner's abilities. The two attended Mithibai College and graduated in 1990.

== Career ==
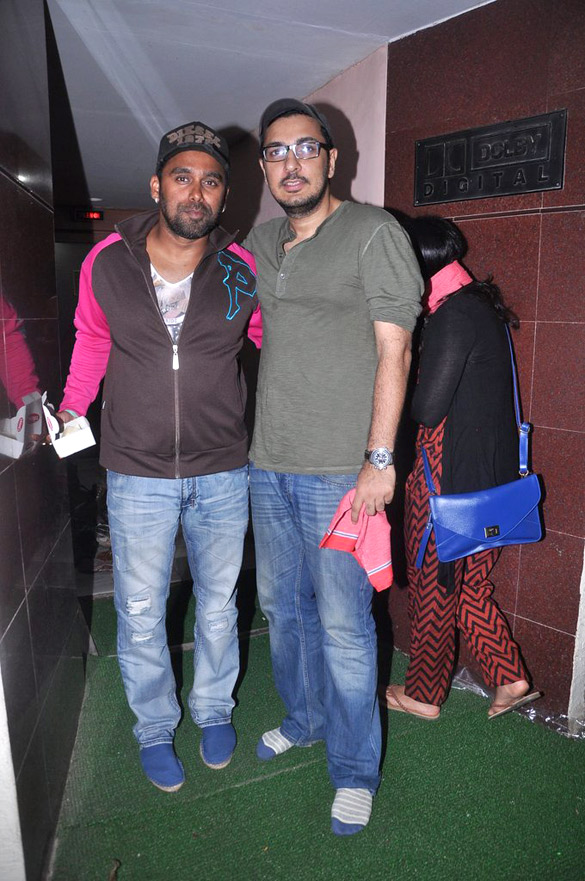
Bosco Martis at 'Gangs Of Wasseypur' screening

Bosco–Caesar started as backup dancer for choreographers LOLLYPOP and Farah Khan. Thereafter, they started their independent career as choreographers in 1994, when they choreographed a stage show for singers duo Shaan and Sagarika for an awards function. Next they choreographed a music video for singer Raageshwari's number "Oye Shava". During the filming of the video, ad film director Prahlad Kakkar happened to walk in and, in turn, asked them to choreograph a few TV commercials he was shooting with cricketer Sachin Tendulkar. Eventually this led to their feature film debut with Vidhu Vinod Chopra's Mission Kashmir in 2000.

Bosco–Caesar announced that they would be officially parting ways while keeping the brand intact in 2016, with Bosco making his directorial debut and Caesar organizing dance workshops. The duo reunited in 2019 to choreograph a song for Sajid Nadiadwala's Chhichhore.

== Television ==
They appeared as mentors in TV reality series, Fame Gurukul (2005) and Chak Dhoom Dhoom (2010) & Bosco appeared as a judge So You Think You Can Dance India (2017) and Dance India Dance Season 7 (2019).

== Filmography ==
- Mission Kashmir (2000)
- Sur: The Melody of Life (2002)
- Kuch Naa Kaho (2003)
- Munnabhai M.B.B.S. (2003)
- Lakshya (2004)
- Swades (2004, Yeh Tar Woh Tara)
- Bunty Aur Babli (2005)
- Bluffmaster! (2005)
- Super (2005, Telugu)
- Fight Club – Members Only (2006)
- Taxi No. 9 2 11: Nau Do Gyarah (2006)
- Jab We Met (2007)
- Salaam-E-Ishq (2007)
- Partner (2007)
- Viyyalavari Kayyalu (2007, Telugu)
- Love Aaj Kal (2009)
- 3 Idiots (2009)
- Theeradha Vilaiyattu Pillai (2010, Tamil)
- Orange (2010, Telugu)
- We Are Family (2010)
- Dum Maaro Dum (2011)
- Lafangey Parindey (2010)
- Force (2011)
- Zindagi Na Milegi Dobara (2011)
- Mere Brother Ki Dulhan (2011)
- Always Kabhi Kabhi (2011)
- Rockstar (2011)
- Desi Boyz (2011)
- Khokababu (2012, Bengali)
- Players (2012)
- Ek Main Aur Ekk Tu (2012)
- Student of the Year (2012)
- Agent Vinod (2012)
- Matru Ki Bijlee Ka Mandola (2013)
- Raanjhanaa (2013)
- Phata Poster Nikhla Hero (2013)
- Besharam (2013)
- R... Rajkumar (2013)
- Jackpot (2013)
- Hasee Toh Phasee (2014)
- Gunday (2014)
- Main Tera Hero (2014)
- Queen (2014)
- Bhoothnath Returns (2014)
- Holiday: A Soldier is Never Off Duty (2014)
- Daawat-e-Ishq (2014)
- Bang Bang! (2014)
- Ungli (2014)
- PK (2014)
- Shamitabh (2015)
- Shaandaar (2015)
- Dil Dhadakne Do (2015)
- Pyaar Ka Punchnama 2 (2015)
- Royal (2015, Bengali)
- Tamasha (2015)
- Srimanthudu (2015, Telugu)
- Loveshhuda (2016)
- Fitoor (2016)
- Ki & Ka (2016)
- Baaghi (2016)
- Udta Punjab (2016)
- Dishoom (2016)
- Happy Bhaag Jayegi (2016)
- A Flying Jatt (2016)
- Baar Baar Dekho (2016)
- Tutak Tutak Tutiya (2016)
- Rock On 2 (2016)
- Dangal (2016)
- Dhruva (2016, Telugu)
- Raees (2017)
- Jolly LLB 2 (2017)
- Machine (2017)
- Badrinath Ki Dulhania (2017)
- A Gentleman (2017)
- Bareilly Ki Barfi (2017)
- Jab Harry Met Sejal (2017)
- Lucknow Central (2017)
- Judwaa 2 (2017)
- Love Per Square Foot (2018)
- Sonu Ke Titu Ki Sweety (2018)
- Veerey Ki Wedding (2018)
- Gold (2018)
- 2.0 (2018, Tamil)
- Rajaratha (2018, Kannada)
- Zero (2018)
- De De Pyaar De (2019)
- Chhichhore (2019)
- War (2019)
- Tanhaji: The Unsung Warrior (2020)
- Chhalaang (2020)
- Koi Jaane Na (2021)
- Butterfly (2020, Kannada)
- Jersey (2022)
- Bhool Bhulaiyaa 2 (2022)
- Jugjugg Jeeyo (2022)
- Doctor G (2022)
- An Action Hero (2022)
- Pathaan (2023)
- Shehzada (2023)
- Tu Jhoothi Main Makkaar (2023)
- Satya Prem Ki Katha (2023)
- Fighter (2024)
- Boomerang (2024, Bengali)
- Bade Miyan Chote Miyan (2024)
- Indian 2 (2024, Tamil)
- Bad Newz (2024)
- Devara: Part 1 (2024, Telugu) - Bosco Martis
- Deva (2025)
- War 2 (2025) - Bosco Martis
- Bandar (2025)
- Pati Patni Aur Woh Do (2026) - Bosco Leslie Martis
- Alpha (2026) - Bosco Martis

=== Independent songs ===
- Baha Kiliki (Smita, 2016)
- I am a Disco Dancer 2.0 (Tiger Shroff, 2020)
- Nach Meri Rani (Guru Randhawa, 2020)
- Dance Meri Rani (Guru Randhawa, 2021)

=== Director ===
- Rocket Gang (2022) (Directed by Bosco)

== Awards ==
| Year | Award | Category | Song | Result | Ref |
|---|---|---|---|---|---|
| 2005 | 8th Zee Cine Awards | Best Choreography | "Door Se Paas" (Musafir) | Nominated | |
| 2005 | Screen Weekly Awards | Best Choreography | "Ishq Kabhi Kariyo Na" (Musafir) | Nominated | |
| 2010 | 55th Filmfare Awards | Best Choreography | "Chor Bazaari" (Love Aaj Kal) | Won | |
| 2010 | 11th IIFA Awards | Best Choreography | "Chor Bazaari" (Love Aaj Kal) | Won | |
| 2010 | 16th Screen Awards | Best Choreography | "Zoobi Doobi" (3 Idiots) | Won | |
| 2012 | 59th National Film Awards | Best Choreography | "Señorita" (Zindagi Na Milegi Dobara) | Won | |
| 2012 | 57th Filmfare Awards | Best Choreography | "Señorita" (Zindagi Na Milegi Dobara) | Won | |
| 2012 | 12th IIFA Awards | Best Choreography | "Señorita" (Zindagi Na Milegi Dobara) | Won | |
| 2012 | Apsara Film Producers Guild Awards | Best Choreography | "Señorita" (Zindagi Na Milegi Dobara) | Won | |
| 2012 | Apsara Film Producers Guild Awards | Best Choreography | "Desi Boyz" (Desi Boyz) | Nominated | |
| 2013 | 58th Filmfare Awards | Best Choreography | "Aunty Ji" (Ek Main Aur Ekk Tu) | Won | |
| 2013 | Apsara Film Producers Guild Awards | Best Choreography | "Daaru Desi" (Cocktail) | Nominated | |
| 2014 | 15th Zee Cine Awards | Best Choreography | "Dhating Naach" (Phata Poster Nikla Hero) | Nominated | |
| 2014 | Apsara Film Producers Guild Awards | Best Choreography | "Tu Mere Agal Bagal Hai" (Phata Poster Nikla Hero) | Nominated | |
| 2015 | 60th Filmfare Awards | Best Choreography | "Hungama Ho Gaya" (Queen) | Nominated | |
| 2015 | 60th Filmfare Awards | Best Choreography | "Tu Meri" (Bang Bang!) | Nominated | |
| 2015 | 60th Filmfare Awards | Best Choreography | "Tune Maari Entriyaan" (Gunday) | Nominated | |
| 2015 | Bollywood Hungama Surfers' Choice Music Awards | Best Choreography | "Tu Meri" (Bang Bang!) | Nominated | |
| 2015 | FOI Online Awards | Best Choreography | "Gallan Goodiyaan" (Dil Dhadakne Do) | Nominated | |
| 2016 | FOI Online Awards | Best Choreography | "Pashminna" (Fitoor) | Nominated | |
| 2016 | FOI Online Awards | Best Choreography | "Kala Chashma" (Baar Baar Dekho) | Won | |
| 2017 | 18th Zee Cine Awards | Best Choreography | "Kala Chashma" (Baar Baar Dekho) | Won | |
| 2017 | 14th Stardust Awards | Best Choreography | "Kala Chashma" (Baar Baar Dekho) | Won | |
| 2018 | 19th Zee Cine Awards | Best Choreography | "Cheez Badi" (Machine) | Nominated | |
| 2018 | 19th Zee Cine Awards | Best Choreography | "Tamma Tamma Again" (Judwaa 2) | Nominated | |
| 2018 | FOI Online Awards | Best Choreography | "Dil Chori" (Sonu Ke Titu Ki Sweety) | Nominated | |
| 2018 | FOI Online Awards | Best Choreography | "Dhyanchand" (Manmarziyaan) | Nominated | |
| 2019 | 20th Zee Cine Awards | Best Choreography | "Sweety Tera Drama" (Sonu Ke Titu Ki Sweety) | Nominated | |
| 2020 | 65th Filmfare Awards | Best Choreography | "Jai Jai Shiv Shankar" (War) | Nominated | |
| 2020 | 65th Filmfare Awards | Best Choreography | "Ghungroo" (War) (along with Tushar Kalia) | Nominated | |
| 2020 | 21st IIFA Awards | Best Choreography | "Ghungroo" (War) (along with Tushar Kalia)) | Won | |
| 2020 | 21st Zee Cine Awards | Best Choreography | "Ghungroo" (War) (along with Tushar Kalia) | Nominated | |
| 2020 | 21st Zee Cine Awards | Best Choreography | "Jai Jai Shiv Shankar" (War) | Won | |
| 2020 | 26th Screen Awards | Best Choreography | "Jai Jai Shiv Shankar" (War) | Won | |
| 2023 | 68th Filmfare Awards | Best Choreography | "Rangisari" (Jugjugg Jeeyo) | Nominated | |
| 2023 | 68th Filmfare Awards | Best Choreography | "Bhool Bhulaiyaa (Title Track)" (Bhool Bhulaiyaa 2) | Nominated | |
| 2023 | 23rd IIFA Awards | Best Choreography | "Bhool Bhulaiyaa (Title Track)" (Bhool Bhulaiyaa 2) | Won | |
| 2023 | 22nd Zee Cine Awards | Best Choreography | "Bhool Bhulaiyaa (Title Track)" (Bhool Bhulaiyaa 2) | Won | |
| 2024 | 69th Filmfare Awards | Best Choreography | "Jhoome Jo Pathaan" (Pathaan) | Nominated | |
| 2025 | 70th Filmfare Awards | Best Choreography | "Tauba Tauba" (Bad Newz) | Won | |
| 2025 | IIFA Awards | Best Choreography | "Tauba Tauba" (Bad Newz) | Won | |
