= Teri Meri =

Song by Shreya Ghoshal

- Screenshot of the song's video featuring Salman Khan and Kareena Kapoor

Song by Rahat Fateh Ali Khan and Shreya Ghoshal

from the album Bodyguard
- Released: 2011
- Genre: Film soundtrack
- Length: 5:40
- Label: T-Series
- Songwriters: Himesh Reshammiya (music); Shabbir Ahmed (lyrics)

"Teri Meri" (transl. Yours and Mine) is a song from the 2011 Hindi film Bodyguard directed by Siddique, starring Salman Khan and Kareena Kapoor. The song was sung by Rahat Fateh Ali Khan and Shreya Ghoshal. The song was composed by Himesh Reshammiya, while its lyrics were penned by Shabbir Ahmed. The song along with the other tracks was released on 27 July 2011.

== Composition and picturization ==
"Teri Meri" is a sad romantic song sung by Rahat Fateh Ali Khan and Shreya Ghoshal. The song is high on Sufi touch, while it scores on vocals. The song is also available in remix and reprise version.

The song is a romantic number from the film Bodyguard. "Teri Meri" was picturised on Salman Khan and Kareena Kapoor. It was choreographed by Vaibhavi Merchant.

The melody was inspired by the traditional Christian Romanian carol, singing about Jesus` Birth "La Vifleem Colo-n Jos".

== Reception ==
Ruchika Kher of the Indo-Asian News Service reviewed the song as moderately paced and a quite average song.

The Times of India placed Teri Meri among the top 10 songs of 2011. The song was non-mover for 19 weeks at No. 1 on The Official Asian Download Chart show on BBC Asian Network, hosted by Bobby Friction. It went on to being one of the few songs to have been in the chart for over an astonishing 30 weeks. The song had also won awards for Shreya Ghoshal at the 13th IIFA Awards, BIG Star Entertainment Awards 2011 and the 2012 Apsara Awards for Best Female Playback Singer.

== Accolades ==
Year	Award	Nominee	Category	Result
2012	Filmfare Awards	Shreya Ghoshal	Best Female Playback Singer	Nominated
2012	Filmfare Awards	Rahat Fateh Ali Khan	Best Male Playback Singer	Nominated
2012	IIFA Awards	Shreya Ghoshal	Best Playback Singer Female	Won
2012	IIFA Awards	Rahat Fateh Ali Khan	Best Playback Singer Male	Nominated
2012	IIFA Awards	Shabbir Ahmed	Best Lyricist	Nominated
2012	Apsara Film & Television Producers Guild Awards	Shreya Ghoshal	Best Playback Singer (Female)	Won
2012	Apsara Film & Television Producers Guild Awards	Rahat Fateh Ali Khan	Best Playback Singer (Male)	Nominated
2012	Apsara Film & Television Producers Guild Awards	Shabbir Ahmed	Best Lyrics	Nominated
2012	18th Lions Gold Awards	Shabbir Ahmed	Favourite Lyricist	Won
2011	BIG Star Entertainment Awards	Shreya Ghoshal	Best Female Playback Singer	Won
2011	Mirchi Music Awards	Rahat Fateh Ali Khan	Male Vocalist of The Year	Nominated
2011	Mirchi Music Awards	Himesh Reshammiya	Music Composer of The Year	Nominated
2011	Mirchi Music Awards	Shabbir Ahmed & Neelesh Misra	Lyricist of The Year	Nominated
