= Kanishk Seth (musician) =

Indian music composer

- Born: 1 December 1995 (age 30)
- Origin: New Delhi, India
- Genres: Electronic music, independent
- Occupations: singer-songwriter, musician
- Years active: 2014–present

Kanishk Seth is an Indian composer, singer and songwriter based in Mumbai. Kanishk became popular after his fusion album Trance With Khusrow and for the song "Rangisari", both of which he produced in collaboration with his mother Kavita Seth, and which was nominated for the Global Indian Music Academy Awards in 2015.

== Personal life ==
Kanishk belongs to a musical family, including his mother Kavita Seth and his sibling Kavish Seth.

== Discography ==
Year	Film	Title	Co-singer(s)	Note(s)	Ref
2022	Jugjugg Jeeyo	"Rangisari"	Kavita Seth	Along with Kavita Seth	
2022	Double XL	"Ki Jaana"	Kavita Seth		
2025	Kesari Chapter 2	"Khumaari"	Kavita Seth	Along with Kavita Seth	

== Songs ==
Year	Song	Album	co-singer(s)	Lyricist
2015	Trance With Khusrow	Album	Kavita Seth	Kanishk Seth
2018	Aane Ko Hai Khaab	EP	Kanishk Seth	Kanishk Seth

== Awards and nominations ==
Year	Category	Nominated For	Result
Global Indian Music Academy Awards
2015	Best Music Debut Non-Film	Trance With Khusrow	Nominated
Global Indian Music Academy Awards
2015	Best Fusion Album	Trance With Khusrow	Nominated
Mirchi Music Awards
2015	Best Fusion Album	Trance With Khusrow	Nominated
