= Filmfare Award for Best Female Playback Singer =

Annual award for Hindi films

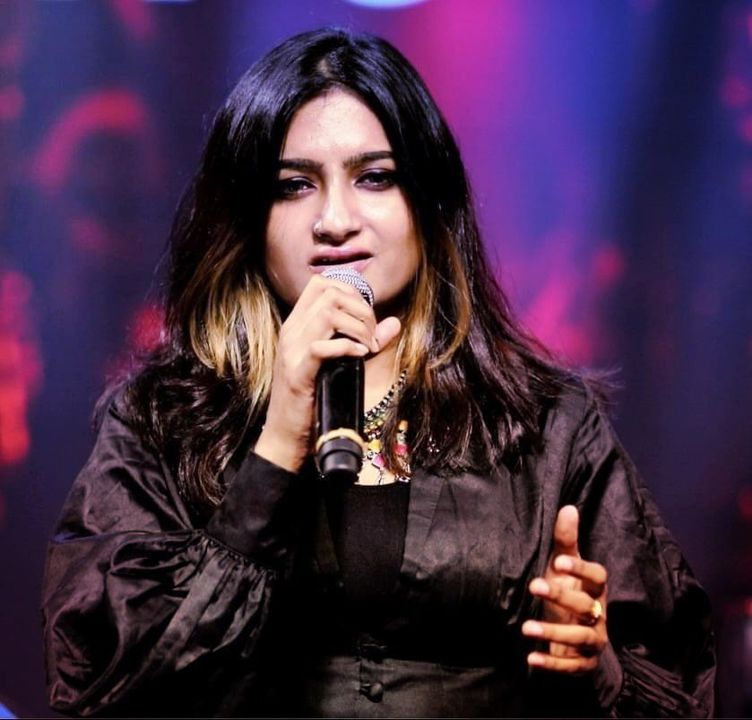
- The 2025 recipient: Madhubanti Bagchi
- Awarded for: Best Performance by a playback singer female
- Country: India
- Presented by: Filmfare
- First award: Lata Mangeshkar, "Aaja Re Pardesi"; Madhumati (1959)
- Currently held by: Madhubanti Bagchi, "Aaj ki Raat"; Stree 2 (2024)
- Website: Filmfare Awards

The Filmfare Best Female Playback Award is given by Filmfare as part of its annual Filmfare Awards for Hindi films, to recognise outstanding performance in a film song by a female playback singer.

Although the award ceremony was established in 1954, the category for best playback singer was introduced in 1959. The award was initially common for both male and female singers until 1967. The category was divided the following year, and ever since there have been two awards presented for male and female singers separately.

== Superlatives ==
Superlative	Artist	Record
Most wins	Asha Bhosle; Alka Yagnik	7
Most nominations	Alka Yagnik	36
Most nominations without ever winning	Jonita Gandhi	4
Most nominations in a single year	Asha Bhosle (1975); Alka Yagnik (1994)	4
Oldest winner	Usha Uthup	64 age
Oldest nominee	Usha Uthup	64 age
Youngest winner	Nazia Hassan	15 age
Youngest nominee	Poornima	14 age
Longest win span	Alka Yagnik; Shreya Ghoshal	16 years
Longest nomination span	Alka Yagnik	33 years

With seven wins each, Asha Bhosle and Alka Yagnik hold the record for most awards in this category. Shreya Ghoshal has won the award six times. Lata Mangeshkar, Anuradha Paudwal and Kavita Krishnamurthy have won the award four times. Bhosle won the award in a record of four consecutive years (1972–75), followed by the three consecutive wins of Paudwal (1991–1993), Krishnamurthy (1995–1997) and Yagnik (2000–2002), respectively.

Two singers have achieved the feat of receiving all the nominations of this category in a particular year: Asha Bhosle was the single nominee in 1973, having all the three nominations to her credit, and Alka Yagnik was the single nominee in 1994, having all the four nominations to her credit, one of which she shared—and eventually jointly won—with Ila Arun.

At age 15, Nazia Hassan became the youngest and the first Pakistani singer to win a Filmfare Award for the song "Aap Jaisa Koi" from Qurbani (1980), while Usha Uthup is the older winner and nominee for the song ""Darling" from 7 Khoon Maaf (2011), winning at the age of 64.

In 1971, Lata Mangeshkar made the unusual gesture of not having her name be considered for the Filmfare Best Female Playback Award, in order to promote fresh talent. After receiving seventh award in 1979, Asha Bhosle emulated her elder sister and requested that her name not be considered for the nominations thereafter. There were ties for two consecutive years between 2010 and 2011.

Before the award was officially divided by gender (1968), Lata Mangeshkar was the only female artist to not only win the Best Playback Singer among female singers, she was the only female singer to be even nominated for the awards. She was also the earliest recipient of this award in 1959. Mangeshkar was the most successful singer in 60s with three wins. Moreover, out of the four awards she got before retiring from the awards voluntarily, Mangeshkar won three of her awards when there was only one award given for playback singing including both male and female singers. Bhosle dominated in the 70s with five wins (Mangeshkar not considered from hereon). In 80s no singer dominated the epoch (Bhosle not considered from hereon); however in 90s Anuradha Paudwal and Kavita Krishnamurthy both had three wins each. Alka Yagnik and Shreya Ghoshal garnered four wins each in the 2000s. Rekha Bhardwaj and Shreya Ghoshal led the 2010s with two wins each, and Asees Kaur and Shilpa Rao each have two wins in the 2020s.

Alka Yagnik holds the record of getting nominated for consecutively 14 years from 1992 till 2005, resulting in 31 nominations and 6 wins, followed by Shreya Ghoshal getting nominated consecutively for 11 years from 2006 to 2016 that resulted in 3 wins and 17 nominations.

=== Most consecutive wins ===
Artist	Number of Wins	Year
Asha Bhosle	4	1972-75
Anuradha Paudwal	3	1991-93
Kavita Krishnamurthy	3	1995-97
Alka Yagnik	3	2000-02
Asha Bhosle	2	1968-69
Shreya Ghoshal	2	2003-04
Shreya Ghoshal	2	2008-09
Asees Kaur	2	2021-22

=== Multiple winners ===
Winners	Number of wins	Years
Asha Bhosle	7	1968, 1969, 1972, 1973, 1974, 1975, 1979
Alka Yagnik	7	1989, 1994, 1998, 2000, 2001, 2002, 2005
Shreya Ghoshal	6	2003, 2004, 2008, 2009, 2016, 2019
Lata Mangeshkar	4	1959, 1963, 1966, 1970
Anuradha Paudwal	4	1986, 1991, 1992, 1993
Kavita Krishnamurthy	4	1995, 1996, 1997, 2003
Sunidhi Chauhan	2	2007, 2011
Rekha Bhardwaj	2	2010, 2012
Asees Kaur	2	2021, 2022
Kavita Seth	2	2010, 2023
Shilpa Rao	2	2020, 2024

=== Multiple nominees ===
Singer	Number of nominations	Number of wins
Alka Yagnik	36	7
Shreya Ghoshal	30	6
Asha Bhosle	20	7
Lata Mangeshkar	19	4
Kavita Krishnamurthy	18	4
Sunidhi Chauhan	17	2
Anuradha Paudwal	12	4
Alisha Chinai	6	1
Shilpa Rao	6	2

== Winners and nominees ==
In 1959, the award category for Best Playback Singer was first instituted after Lata Mangeshkar refused to perform the song "Rasik Balma Se Dil Kyon Lagaya" from the film Chori Chori by Shankar Jaikishan at the 3rd Filmfare Awards. Mangeshkar also became the first recipient of this award. Separate awards for male and female singers were introduced from 1968.

Note: The category for Best Playback Singer was established in 1959, and until 1967 both male and female singers used to compete for a single award.

Table key
‡	Indicates the winner

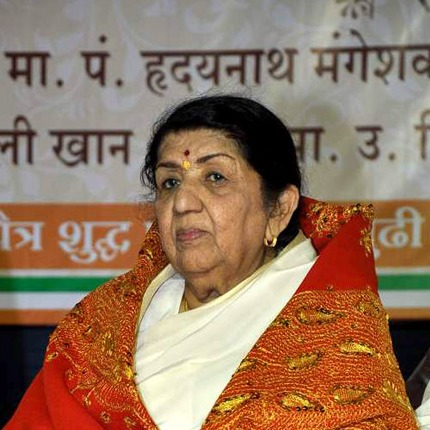
Lata Mangeshkar was the first winner in this category for her rendition of "Aaja Re Pardesi" from Madhumati (1958).

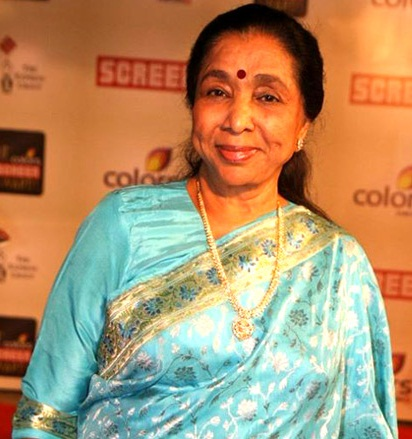
Asha Bhosle received this award seven times from twenty nominations. She is the only female vocalist to have won four times consecutively.

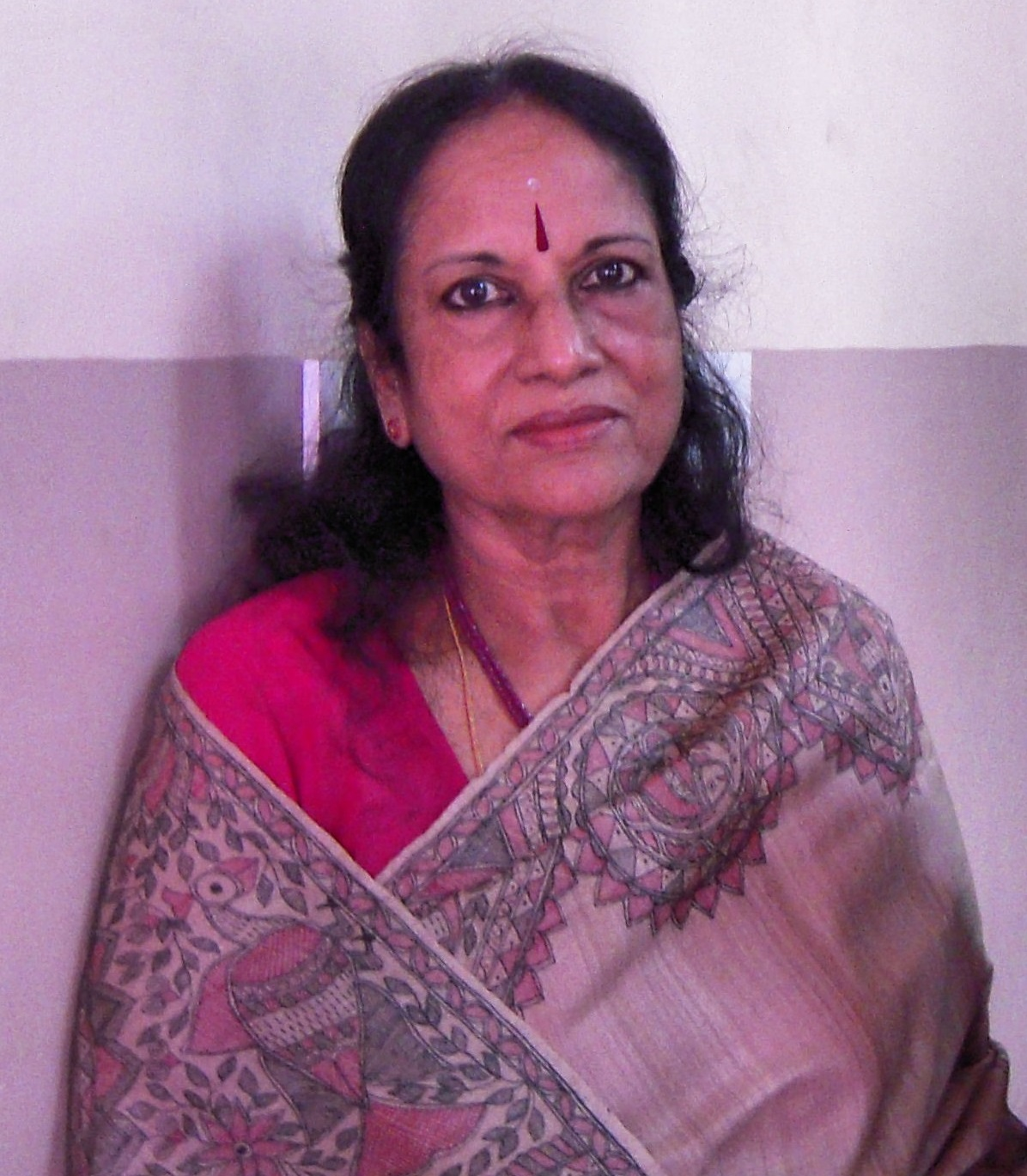
Vani Jairam won for her contribution to the song "Mere To Giridhar Gopal" from Meera (1979).

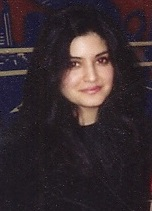
At age 15, Nazia Hassan became the youngest and the first Pakistani singer to win a Filmfare Award for the song "Aap Jaisa Koi" from Qurbani (1980).

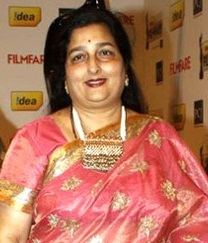
Anuradha Paudwal has four wins in this category from twelve nominations.

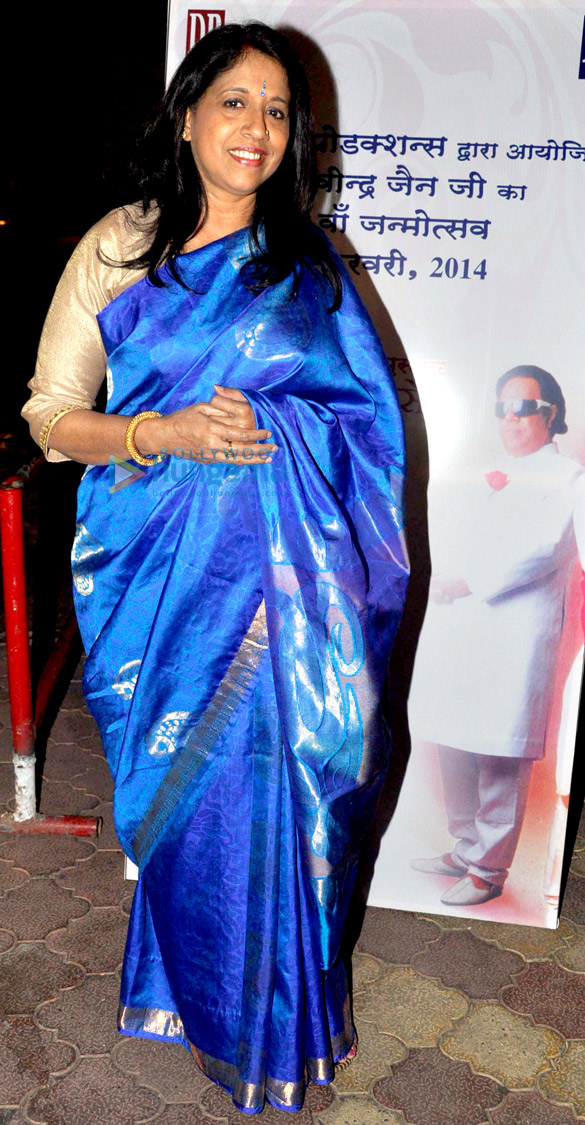
Kavita Krishnamurthy has four wins in this category from eighteen nominations.

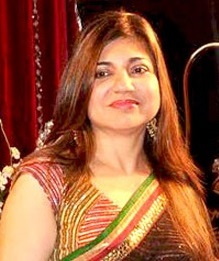
With thirty-six nominations, Alka Yagnik is the most nominated woman in this category, winning seven times between 1988 and 2005.

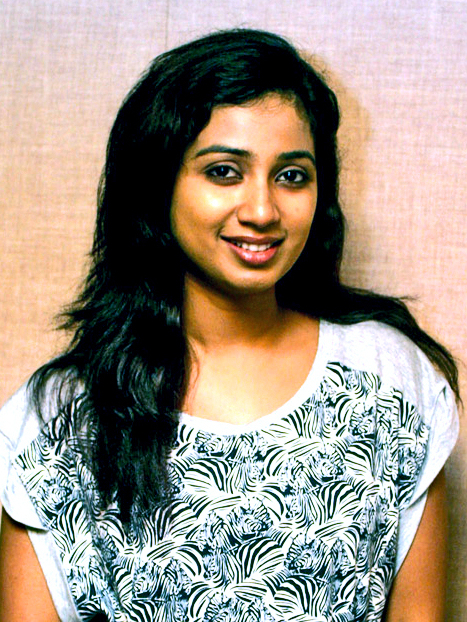
Winning for the second time at age 19 for her work in the song "Jaadu Hai Nasha Hai" from Jism (2003), Shreya Ghoshal became the youngest two-time Filmfare Award-winning singer.

=== 1950s ===
Year	Singer	Song	Film	Ref.
1959 (6th)	Lata Mangeshkar ‡	"Aaja Re Pardesi"	Madhumati	

=== 1960s ===
Year	Singer	Song	Film	Ref.
1960 (7th)	Award was Won by a Male singer			
1960 (7th)	Lata Mangeshkar	"Bhaiya Mere"	Chhoti Bahen	
1961 (8th)	Award was Won by a Male singer			
1961 (8th)	Lata Mangeshkar	"Dil Apna Aur Preet Parai"	Dil Apna Aur Preet Parai	
1961 (8th)	Lata Mangeshkar	"Pyar Kiya To Darna Kya"	Mughal-e-Azam	
1962 (9th)	Award was Won by a Male singer			
1963 (10th)	Lata Mangeshkar ‡	"Kahin Deep Jale Kahin Dil"	Bees Saal Baad	
1963 (10th)	Lata Mangeshkar	"Aap Ki Nazaron Ne Samjha"	Anpadh	
1964 (11th)	Award was Won by a Male singer			
1964 (11th)	Lata Mangeshkar	"Jo Vada Kiya"	Taj Mahal	
1965 (12th)	Award was Won by a Male singer			
1965 (12th)	Lata Mangeshkar	"Jyot Se Jyot"	Sant Gyaneshwar	
1966 (13th)	Lata Mangeshkar ‡	"Tumhi Mere Mandir"	Khandan	
1966 (13th)	Lata Mangeshkar	"Ek Tu Na Mila"	Himalay Ki God Mein	
1967 (14th)	Award was Won by a Male singer			
1967 (14th)	Lata Mangeshkar	"Lo Aagai Unki Yaad"	Do Badan	
1967 (14th)	Lata Mangeshkar	"Aaj Phir Jeene Ki Tamanna Hai"	Guide	
1968 (15th)	Asha Bhosle ‡	"Garibon Ki Suno"	Dus Lakh	
1968 (15th)	Lata Mangeshkar	"Baharo Mera Jeevan Bhi Sawaro"	Aakhri Khat	
1968 (15th)	Lata Mangeshkar	"Sawan Ka Mahina"	Milan	
1969 (16th)	Asha Bhosle ‡	"Parde Men Rahne Do"	Shikar	
1969 (16th)	Lata Mangeshkar	"Milti Hai Zindagi Men"	Ankhen	
1969 (16th)	Sharda	"Tumhari Bhi Jai Jai"	Diwana	

=== 1970s ===
Year	Singer	Song	Film	Ref.
1970 (17th)	Lata Mangeshkar ‡	"Aap Mujhe Achhe Lagne Lage"	Jeene Ki Raah	
1970 (17th)	Lata Mangeshkar	"Kaise Rahun Chup"	Intaqam	
1970 (17th)	Sharda	"Tere Ang Ka Rang Hai Angoori"	Chanda Aur Bijli	
1971 (18th)	Sharda ‡	"Baat Zara Hai Apas Ki"	Jahan Pyar Miley	
1971 (18th)	Lata Mangeshkar	"Bindiya Chamke Gi"	Do Raaste	
1971 (18th)	Lata Mangeshkar	"Babul Pyare"	Johny Mera Naam	
1972 (19th)	Asha Bhosle ‡	"Piya Tu Ab To Aja"	Caravan	
1972 (19th)	Asha Bhosle	"Zindagi Ek Safar Hai"	Andaz	
1972 (19th)	Sharda	"Aapke Peeche"	Ek Nari Ek Brahmachari	
1973 (20th)	Asha Bhosle ‡	"Dum Maro Dum"	Haré Rama Haré Krishna	
1973 (20th)	Asha Bhosle	"Sooni Sooni Sans Ke Sitar Par"	Lal Patthar	
1973 (20th)	Asha Bhosle	"Maine Kaha Na Na Na"	Lalkar	
1974 (21st)	Asha Bhosle ‡	"Hone Lagi Hai Raat"	Naina	
1974 (21st)	Asha Bhosle	"Hungama Ho Gaya"	Anhonee	
1974 (21st)	Asha Bhosle	"Jab Andhera Hota Hai"	Raja Rani	
1974 (21st)	Poornima	"Tera Mujh Se"	Aa Gale Lag Jaa	
1974 (21st)	Minoo Purshottam	"Raat Piya Ke Sang Jagi Re Sakhi"	Prem Parbat	
1975 (22nd)	Asha Bhosle ‡	"Chain Se Ham Ko Kabhi"	Pran Jaye Per Vachan Na Jaye	
1975 (22nd)	Asha Bhosle	"Main Ja Rahi Thi"	Bidaai	
1975 (22nd)	Asha Bhosle	"Yeh Hawas Kya Hai"	Hawas	
1975 (22nd)	Asha Bhosle	"Chori Chori Solah Shringar Karoongi"	Manoranjan	
1975 (22nd)	Suman Kalyanpur	"Behna Ne Bhai Ki Kalai Se Pyar Bandha Hai"	Resham Ki Dori	
1976 (23rd)	Sulakshana Pandit ‡	"Tu Hi Sagar Tu Hi Kinara"	Sankalp	
1976 (23rd)	Asha Bhosle	"Kal Ke Apne"	Amanush	
1976 (23rd)	Asha Bhosle	"Sapna Mera Toot Gaya"	Khel Khel Mein	
1976 (23rd)	Preeti Sagar	"My Heart Is Beating"	Julie	
1976 (23rd)	Usha Mangeshkar	"Main To Arti Utaroon"	Jai Santoshi Maa	
1977 (24th)	Hemlata ‡	"Tu Jo Mere Sur Mein"	Chitchor	
1977 (24th)	Asha Bhosle	"I Love You, You Love Me"	Barood	
1977 (24th)	Hemlata	"Sun Ke Teri Pukar"	Fakira	
1977 (24th)	Sulakshana Pandit	"Bandhi Re Kahe Preet"	Sankoch	
1978 (25th)	Preeti Sagar ‡	"Mero Gaam Katha Parey"	Manthan	
1978 (25th)	Asha Bhosle	"Layi Kahan Hai Zindagi"	Taxi-Taxie	
1978 (25th)	Poornima	"Kya Hua Tera Wada"	Hum Kisise Kum Naheen	
1978 (25th)	Usha Mangeshkar	"O Mungda, Mungda Main Gud Ki Dali"	Inkaar	
1979 (26th)	Asha Bhosle ‡	"Yeh Mera Dil Yaar Ka Diwana"	Don	
1979 (26th)	Asha Bhosle	"O Saathi Re"	Muqaddar Ka Sikandar	
1979 (26th)	Hemlata	"Ankhiyon Ke Jharokhon Se"	Ankhiyon Ke Jharokhon Se	
1979 (26th)	Shobha Gurtu	"Saiyan Rooth Gaye"	Main Tulsi Tere Aangan Ki	
1979 (26th)	Usha Uthup	"One Two Cha Cha Cha"	Shalimar	

=== 1980s ===
Year	Singer	Song	Film	Ref.
1980 (27th)	Vani Jairam ‡	"Mere To Giridhar Gopal"	Meera	
1980 (27th)	Chhaya Ganguly	"Aap Ki Yaad Aati Rahi Raat Bhar"	Gaman	
1980 (27th)	Hemlata	"Megha, O Re Megha"	Sunayana	
1980 (27th)	Usha Mangeshkar	"Ham Se Nazar To Milao"	Ikraar	
1980 (27th)	Vani Jairam	"Ayri Main To Prem Diwani"	Meera	
1981 (28th)	Nazia Hassan ‡	"Aap Jaisa Koi"	Qurbani	
1981 (28th)	Chandrani Mukherjee	"Pehchan To Thi"	Griha Pravesh	
1981 (28th)	Hemlata	"Too Is Tarah Se"	Aap To Aise Na The	
1981 (28th)	Kanchan	"Laila O Laila"	Qurbani	
1981 (28th)	Usha Uthup	"Hari Om Hari"	Pyaara Dushman	
1982 (29th)	Parween Sultana ‡	"Hamen Tumse Pyaar Kitna"	Kudrat	
1982 (29th)	Alka Yagnik	"Mere Angne Men"	Laawaris	
1982 (29th)	Chandrani Mukherjee	"Mohabbat Rang Layegi"	Poonam	
1982 (29th)	Sharon Prabhakar	"Mere Jaesi Haseena"	Armaan	
1982 (29th)	Usha Uthup	"Ramba Ho-Ho-Ho Samba Ho-Ho-Ho"	Armaan	
1983 (30th)	Salma Agha ‡	"Dil Ke Arman Ansuon Men Bah Gaye"	Nikaah	
1983 (30th)	Anuradha Paudwal	"Maine Ek Geet Likha Hai"	Yeh Nazdeekiyan	
1983 (30th)	Nazia Hassan	"Boom Boom"	Star	
1983 (30th)	Salma Agha	"Dil Ki Yeh Arzoo Thi"	Nikaah	
1983 (30th)	Salma Agha	"Faza Bhi Hai Jawan"	Nikaah	
1984 (31st)	Aarti Mukherjee ‡	"Do Naina Aur Ek Kahaani"	Masoom	
1984 (31st)	Anuradha Paudwal	"Too Mera Hero Hai"	Hero	
1984 (31st)	Chandrani Mukherjee	"Aa Ja Ke Teri Raah Men Palke Bicha"	Lal Chunariya	
1985 (32nd)	Anupama Deshpande ‡	"Sohni Chenab De Kinare"	Sohni Mahiwal	
1985 (32nd)	Salma Agha	"Dance Dance"	Kasam Paida Karne Wale Ki	
1986 (33rd)	Anuradha Paudwal ‡	"Mere Man Baaja Mirdang"	Utsav	
1986 (33rd)	Kavita Krishnamurti	"Tumse Milkar Na Jane"	Pyar Jhukta Nahin	
1986 (33rd)	S. Janaki	"Yaar Bina Chen Kahan Ray"	Saaheb	
1987	NO CEREMONY			
1988	NO CEREMONY			
1989 (34th)	Alka Yagnik ‡	"Ek Do Teen Char"	Tezaab	
1989 (34th)	Anuradha Paudwal	"Jeena Nahi"	Tezaab	
1989 (34th)	Sadhana Sargam	"Main Teri Hoon Janam"	Khoon Bhari Maang	

=== 1990s ===
Year	Photos of winners	Singer	Song	Film	Ref.
1990 (35th)		Sapna Mukherjee ‡	"Tirchhi Topiwale"	Tridev	
1990 (35th)		Alisha Chinai	"Raat Bhar"	Tridev	
1990 (35th)		Anuradha Paudwal	"Bekhabar Bewafa"	Ram Lakhan	
1990 (35th)		Anuradha Paudwal	"Tera Naam Liya"	Ram Lakhan	
1990 (35th)		Kavita Krishnamurthy	"Na Jaane Kahan Se Aayi Hain"	ChaalBaaz	
1991 (36th)		Anuradha Paudwal ‡	"Nazar Ke Saamne"	Aashiqui	
1991 (36th)		Anuradha Paudwal	"Mujhe Neend Na Aaye"	Dil	
1991 (36th)		Kavita Krishnamurthy	"Chandni Raat Hain"	Baaghi: A Rebel for Love	
1992 (37th)		Anuradha Paudwal ‡	"Dil Hai Ke Manta Nahin"	Dil Hai Ke Manta Nahin	
1992 (37th)		Alka Yagnik	"Dekha Hai Pehli Baar"	Saajan	
1992 (37th)		Anuradha Paudwal	"Bahut Pyar Karte Hain"	Saajan	
1992 (37th)		Kavita Krishnamurthy	"Saudagar Sauda Kar"	Saudagar	
1993 (38th)		Anuradha Paudwal ‡	"Dhak Dhak Karne Laga"	Beta	
1993 (38th)		Alka Yagnik	"Aisi Deewangi"	Deewana	
1993 (38th)		Kavita Krishnamurthy	"Main Tujhe Kabool"	Khuda Gawah	
1993 (38th)		Anuradha Paudwal	"O Rabba Koi To Bataye"	Sangeet	
1994 (39th)		Alka Yagnik and Ila Arun ‡	"Choli Ke Peechhe Kya Hai"	Khalnayak	
1994 (39th)		Alka Yagnik	"Baazigar O Baazigar"	Baazigar	
1994 (39th)		Alka Yagnik	"Hum Hain Rahi Pyar Ke"	Hum Hain Rahi Pyar Ke	
1994 (39th)		Alka Yagnik	"Paalki Pe Hoke Sawaar"	Khalnayak	
1995 (40th)		Kavita Krishnamurthy ‡	"Pyaar Hua Chupke Se"	1942: A Love Story	
1995 (40th)		Alisha Chinai	"Ruk Ruk"	Vijaypath	
1995 (40th)		Alka Yagnik	"Chura Ke Dil Mera"	Main Khiladi Tu Anari	
1995 (40th)		Alka Yagnik	"Raah Mein"	Vijaypath	
1995 (40th)		Kavita Krishnamurthy	"Tu Cheez Badi Mast Mast"	Mohra	
1996 (41st)		Kavita Krishnamurthy ‡	"Mera Piya Ghar Aaya"	Yaraana	
1996 (41st)		Alka Yagnik	"Raja Ko Rani Se Pyar"	Akele Hum Akele Tum	
1996 (41st)		Alka Yagnik	"Aankhiyan Milao"	Raja	
1996 (41st)		Kavita Krishnamurthy	"Pyaar Ye Jaane"	Rangeela	
1996 (41st)		Shweta Shetty	"Mangta Hai Kya"	Rangeela	
1997 (42nd)		Kavita Krishnamurthy ‡	"Aaj Main Upar"	Khamoshi: The Musical	
1997 (42nd)		Alka Yagnik	"Baahon Ke Darmiyan"	Khamoshi: The Musical	
1997 (42nd)		Alka Yagnik	"Pardesi Pardesi"	Raja Hindustani	
1997 (42nd)		Kavita Krishnamurthy	"O Yaara Dil Lagana"	Agni Sakshi	
1998 (43rd)		Alka Yagnik ‡	"Meri Mehbooba"	Pardes	
1998 (43rd)		Alka Yagnik	"Mere Khwaabon Mein Tu"	Gupt: The Hidden Truth	
1998 (43rd)		K. S. Chithra	"Paayale Chhun Mun"	Virasat	
1998 (43rd)		Kavita Krishnamurthy	"Dhol Bajne Laga"	Virasat	
1998 (43rd)		Kavita Krishnamurthy	"I Love My India"	Pardes	
1999 (44th)		Jaspinder Narula ‡	"Pyaar To Hona Hi Tha"	Pyaar To Hona Hi Tha	
1999 (44th)		Alka Yagnik	"Chamma Chamma"	China Gate	
1999 (44th)		Alka Yagnik	"Kuch Kuch Hota Hai"	Kuch Kuch Hota Hai	
1999 (44th)		Sanjivani	"Chori Chori Jab Nazrein Mili"	Kareeb	
1999 (44th)		Sapna Awasthi	"Chaiyya Chaiyya"	Dil Se..	

=== 2000s ===
Year	Photos of winners	Singer	Song	Film	Ref
2000 (45th)		Alka Yagnik ‡	"Taal Se Taal Mila"	Taal	
2000 (45th)		Alka Yagnik	"Chand Chupa Badal Mein"	Hum Dil De Chuke Sanam	
2000 (45th)		Kavita Krishnamurthy	"Hum Dil De Chuke Sanam"	Hum Dil De Chuke Sanam	
2000 (45th)		Kavita Krishnamurthy	"Nimbooda"	Hum Dil De Chuke Sanam	
2000 (45th)		Sunidhi Chauhan	"Ruki Ruki"	Mast	
2001 (46th)		Alka Yagnik ‡	"Dil Ne Yeh Kaha Hain Dil Se"	Dhadkan	
2001 (46th)		Alka Yagnik	"Haaye Mera Dil"	Josh	
2001 (46th)		Alka Yagnik	"Panchhi Nadiyan"	Refugee	
2001 (46th)		Preeti & Pinky	"Piya Piya"	Har Dil Jo Pyar Karega	
2001 (46th)		Sunidhi Chauhan	"Mehboob Mere"	Fiza	
2002 (47th)		Alka Yagnik ‡	"O Re Chhori"	Lagaan	
2002 (47th)		Alka Yagnik	"San Sanana"	Asoka	
2002 (47th)		Alka Yagnik	"Jaane Kyun"	Dil Chahta Hai	
2002 (47th)		Kavita Krishnamurthy	"Dheeme Dheeme Gaaon"	Zubeidaa	
2002 (47th)		Vasundhara Das	"Rabba Mere Rabba"	Aks	
2003 (48th)		Shreya Ghoshal and Kavita Krishnamurthy ‡	"Dola Re Dola"	Devdas	
2003 (48th)		Alka Yagnik	"Sanam Mere Humraaz"	Humraaz	
2003 (48th)		Alka Yagnik	"Aapke Pyaar Mein"	Raaz	
2003 (48th)		Kavita Krishnamurthy	"Maar Daala"	Devdas	
2003 (48th)		Shreya Ghoshal	"Bairi Piya"	Devdas	
2004 (49th)		Shreya Ghoshal ‡	"Jaadu Hai Nasha Hai"	Jism	
2004 (49th)		Alisha Chinai	"Chot Dil Pe Lagi"	Ishq Vishk	
2004 (49th)		Alka Yagnik	"Tauba Tumhare"	Chalte Chalte	
2004 (49th)		Alka Yagnik	"Odhni Odh Ke"	Tere Naam	
2004 (49th)		K. S. Chithra	"Koi Mil Gaya"	Koi... Mil Gaya	
2005 (50th)		Alka Yagnik ‡	"Hum Tum"	Hum Tum	
2005 (50th)		Alka Yagnik	"Lal Dupatta"	Mujhse Shaadi Karogi	
2005 (50th)		Alka Yagnik	"Saanwariya"	Swades	
2005 (50th)		Sadhana Sargam	"Aao Naa"	Kyun! Ho Gaya Na...	
2005 (50th)		Sunidhi Chauhan	"Dhoom Macha Le"	Dhoom	
2006 (51st)		Alisha Chinai ‡	"Kajra Re"	Bunty Aur Babli	
2006 (51st)		Shreya Ghoshal	"Piyu Bole"	Parineeta	
2006 (51st)		Shreya Ghoshal	"Agar Tum Mil Jao"	Zeher	
2006 (51st)		Sunidhi Chauhan	"Deedar De"	Dus	
2006 (51st)		Sunidhi Chauhan	"Kaisi Paheli Zindagani"	Parineeta	
2007 (52nd)		Sunidhi Chauhan ‡	"Beedi"	Omkara	
2007 (52nd)		Alka Yagnik	"Kabhi Alvida Naa Kehna"	Kabhi Alvida Naa Kehna	
2007 (52nd)		Shreya Ghoshal	"Pal Pal Har Pal"	Lage Raho Munna Bhai	
2007 (52nd)		Sunidhi Chauhan	"Aashiqui Mein"	36 China Town	
2007 (52nd)		Sunidhi Chauhan	"Soniye"	Aksar	
2008 (53rd)		Shreya Ghoshal ‡	"Barso Re"	Guru	
2008 (53rd)		Alisha Chinai	"It's Rocking"	Kya Love Story Hai	
2008 (53rd)		Shreya Ghoshal	"Yeh Ishq Haaye"	Jab We Met	
2008 (53rd)		Sunidhi Chauhan	"Aaja Nachle"	Aaja Nachle	
2008 (53rd)		Sunidhi Chauhan	"Sajanaji Vari Vari"	Honeymoon Travels Pvt. Ltd.	
2009 (54th)		Shreya Ghoshal ‡	"Teri Ore"	Singh Is Kinng	
2009 (54th)		Alka Yagnik	"Tu Muskura"	Yuvvraaj	
2009 (54th)		Neha Bhasin	"Kuchh Khaas"	Fashion	
2009 (54th)		Shilpa Rao	"Khuda Jaane"	Bachna Ae Haseeno	
2009 (54th)		Shruti Pathak	"Mar Jaava"	Fashion	
2009 (54th)		Sunidhi Chauhan	"Dance Pe Chance"	Rab Ne Bana Di Jodi	

=== 2010s ===
Year	Photos of winners	Singer	Song	Film	Ref
2010 (55th)		Kavita Seth ‡ Rekha Bhardwaj ‡	"Iktara" "Genda Phool"	Wake Up Sid; Delhi-6	
2010 (55th)		Alisha Chinai	"Tera Hone Laga Hoon"	Ajab Prem Ki Ghazab Kahani	
2010 (55th)		Shilpa Rao	"Mudi Mudi"	Paa	
2010 (55th)		Shreya Ghoshal	"Zoobi Doobi"	3 Idiots	
2010 (55th)		Sunidhi Chauhan	"Chor Bazaari"	Love Aaj Kal	
2011 (56th)		Mamta Sharma ‡ Sunidhi Chauhan ‡	"Munni Badnaam Hui" "Sheila Ki Jawani"	Dabangg; Tees Maar Khan	
2011 (56th)		Shreya Ghoshal	"Bahara"	I Hate Luv Storys	
2011 (56th)		Shreya Ghoshal	"Noor-e-Khuda"	My Name Is Khan	
2011 (56th)		Sunidhi Chauhan	"Udi"	Guzaarish	
2012 (57th)		Usha Uthup and Rekha Bhardwaj ‡	"Darling"	7 Khoon Maaf	
2012 (57th)		Alyssa Mendonsa	"Khwabon Ke Parindey"	Zindagi Na Milegi Dobara	
2012 (57th)		Harshdeep Kaur	"Katiya Karun"	Rockstar	
2012 (57th)		Shreya Ghoshal	"Teri Meri"	Bodyguard	
2012 (57th)		Shreya Ghoshal	"Saibo"	Shor In The City	
2013 (58th)		Shalmali Kholgade ‡	"Pareshaan"	Ishaqzaade	
2013 (58th)		Kavita Seth	"Tumhi Ho Bandhu"	Cocktail	
2013 (58th)		Neeti Mohan	"Jiya Re"	Jab Tak Hai Jaan	
2013 (58th)		Shreya Ghoshal	"Saans"	Jab Tak Hai Jaan	
2013 (58th)		Shreya Ghoshal	"Chikni Chameli"	Agneepath	
2014 (59th)		Monali Thakur ‡	"Sawaar Loon"	Lootera	
2014 (59th)		Shreya Ghoshal	"Sunn Raha Hai"	Aashiqui 2	
2014 (59th)		Chinmayi Sripada	"Titli"	Chennai Express	
2014 (59th)		Shalmali Kholgade	"Balam Pichkari"	Yeh Jawaani Hai Deewani	
2014 (59th)		Shreya Ghoshal	"Nagada Sang Dhol"	Goliyon Ki Raasleela Ram-Leela	
2015 (60th)		Kanika Kapoor ‡	"Baby Doll"	Ragini MMS 2	
2015 (60th)		Jyoti Nooran & Sultana Nooran	"Pathaka Guddi"	Highway	
2015 (60th)		Rekha Bhardwaj	"Hamari Atariya Pe"	Dedh Ishqiya	
2015 (60th)		Shreya Ghoshal	"Manwa Laage"	Happy New Year	
2015 (60th)		Sona Mohapatra	"Naina"	Khoobsurat	
2016 (61st)		Shreya Ghoshal ‡	"Deewani Mastani"	Bajirao Mastani	
2016 (61st)		Alka Yagnik	"Agar Tum Saath Ho"	Tamasha	
2016 (61st)		Anusha Mani	"Gulaabo"	Shaandaar	
2016 (61st)		Monali Thakur	"Moh Moh Ke Dhaage"	Dum Laga Ke Haisha	
2016 (61st)		Palak Muchhal	"Prem Ratan Dhan Payo"	Prem Ratan Dhan Payo	
2016 (61st)		Priya Saraiya	"Sun Saathiya"	ABCD 2	
2017 (62nd)		Neha Bhasin ‡	"Jag Ghoomeya"	Sultan	
2017 (62nd)		Palak Muchhal	"Kaun Tujhe"	M.S. Dhoni: The Untold Story	
2017 (62nd)		Jonita Gandhi	"The Breakup Song"	Ae Dil Hai Mushkil	
2017 (62nd)		Kanika Kapoor	"Da Da Dasse"	Udta Punjab	
2017 (62nd)		Neeti Mohan	"Sau Aasman"	Baar Baar Dekho	
2017 (62nd)		Qurat-ul-Ain Balouch	"Kaari Kaari"	Pink	
2018 (63rd)		Meghna Mishra ‡	"Nachdi Phira"	Secret Superstar	
2018 (63rd)		Monali Thakur	"Khol De Baahein"	Meri Pyaari Bindu	
2018 (63rd)		Nikhita Gandhi	"Ghar"	Jab Harry Met Sejal	
2018 (63rd)		Ronkini Gupta	"Rafu"	Tumhari Sulu	
2018 (63rd)		Shashaa Tirupati	"Kanha"	Shubh Mangal Saavdhan	
2018 (63rd)		Shreya Ghoshal	"Thodi Der"	Half Girlfriend	
2019 (64th)		Shreya Ghoshal ‡	"Ghoomar"	Padmaavat	
2019 (64th)		Harshdeep Kaur, Vibha Saraf	"Dilbaro"	Raazi	
2019 (64th)		Jonita Gandhi	"Ahista"	Laila Majnu	
2019 (64th)		Ronkini Gupta	"Chaav Laga"	Sui Dhaaga	
2019 (64th)		Sunidhi Chauhan	"Ae Watan"	Raazi	
2019 (64th)		Sunidhi Chauhan	"Manwaa"	October	

=== 2020s ===
Year	Photos of winners	Singer	Song	Film	Ref
2020 (65th)		Shilpa Rao ‡	"Ghungroo"	War	
2020 (65th)		Neha Bhasin	"Chashni"	Bharat	
2020 (65th)		Parampara Thakur	"Mere Sohneya"	Kabir Singh	
2020 (65th)		Shreya Ghoshal	"Yeh Aaina"	Kabir Singh	
2020 (65th)		Shreya Ghoshal and Vaishali Mhade	"Ghar More Pardesiya"	Kalank	
2020 (65th)		Sona Mohapatra and Jyotica Tangri	"Baby Gold"	Saand Ki Aankh	
2021 (66th)		Asees Kaur ‡	"Hui Malang"	Malang	
2021 (66th)		Antara Mitra	"Mehrama"	Love Aaj Kal	
2021 (66th)		Palak Muchhal	"Mann Ki Dori (Female)"	Gunjan Saxena: The Kargil Girl	
2021 (66th)		Shraddha Mishra	"Mar Jayein Hum"	Shikara	
2021 (66th)		Sunidhi Chauhan	"Paas Nahi Toh Fail"	Shakuntala Devi	
2022 (67th)		Asees Kaur ‡	"Raataan Lambiyaan"	Shershaah	
2022 (67th)		Shreya Ghoshal	"Param Sundari"	Mimi	
2022 (67th)		Asees Kaur	"Lakeeran"	Haseen Dilruba	
2022 (67th)		Neha Kakkar	"Matlabi Yariyan"	The Girl on the Train	
2022 (67th)		Priya Saraiya	"Kalle Kalle"	Chandigarh Kare Aashiqui	
2022 (67th)		Shreya Ghoshal	"Chaka Chak"	Atrangi Re	
2023 (68th)		Kavita Seth ‡	"Rangisari"	Jugjugg Jeeyo	
2023 (68th)		Janhvi Shrimankar	"Dholida"	Gangubai Kathiawadi	
2023 (68th)		Shreya Ghoshal	"Jab Saiyaan"	Gangubai Kathiawadi	
2023 (68th)		Jonita Gandhi	"Deva Deva"	Brahmāstra: Part One – Shiva	
2023 (68th)		Shilpa Rao	"Tere Hawaale"	Laal Singh Chaddha	
2024 (69th)		Shilpa Rao ‡	"Besharam Rang"	Pathaan	
2024 (69th)		Shilpa Rao	"Chaleya"	Jawan	
2024 (69th)		Deepthi Suresh	"Aararaari Raaro"	Jawan	
2024 (69th)		Jonita Gandhi	"Hey Fikar"	8 A.M. Metro	
2024 (69th)		Shreya Ghoshal	"Tum Kya Mile"	Rocky Aur Rani Kii Prem Kahaani	
2024 (69th)		Shreya Ghoshal	"Ve Kamleya"	Rocky Aur Rani Kii Prem Kahaani	
2025 (70th)		Madhubanti Bagchi ‡	"Aaj ki Raat"	Stree 2	
2025 (70th)		Anumita Nadesan	"Tenu Sang Rakhna"	Jigra	
2025 (70th)		Rekha Bhardwaj	"Nikat"	Kill	
2025 (70th)		Shilpa Rao	"Ishq Jaisa Kuch "	Fighter	
2025 (70th)		Shreya Ghoshal	"Dheeme Dheeme"	Laapataa Ladies	

== See also ==
- Filmfare Award for Best Male Playback Singer
- Filmfare Awards
- Cinema of India
