= Jugjugg Jeeyo =

2022 Indian film by Raj Mehta

- Theatrical release poster
- Directed by: Raj Mehta
- Screenplay by: Anurag Singh; Sumit Batheja; Rishabh Sharma
- Dialogues by: Rishabh Sharma
- Story by: Anurag Singh
- Produced by: Hiroo Yash Johar; Karan Johar; Apoorva Mehta
- Starring: Anil Kapoor; Neetu Kapoor; Varun Dhawan; Kiara Advani; Maniesh Paul; Prajakta Koli
- Cinematography: Jay I. Patel
- Edited by: Manish More
- Music by: Score: John Stewart Eduri; Songs: See Soundtrack
- Production companies: Dharma Productions; Viacom18 Studios
- Distributed by: Viacom18 Studios
- Release date: 24 June 2022
- Running time: 148 minutes
- Country: India
- Language: Hindi
- Budget: ₹120 crore
- Box office: est. ₹140.13 crore

Jugjugg Jeeyo (transl. Live a Long Life) is a 2022 Indian Hindi-language family comedy-drama film directed by Raj Mehta and produced by Dharma Productions and Viacom18 Studios. The film stars Anil Kapoor, Neetu Kapoor, Varun Dhawan, Kiara Advani, Maniesh Paul, and debutante Prajakta Koli.

Jugjugg Jeeyo was released on 24 June 2022 and received mixed-to-positive reviews from critics with praise towards the performances, screenplay and humour. The film grossed ₹101.23 crore (US$11 million) in India and ₹34.90 crore (US$3.6 million) overseas, for a worldwide gross collection of ₹140.13 crore (US$15 million) it performed average at the box office .

At the 68th Filmfare Awards, Jugjugg Jeeyo received six nominations, including Best Supporting Actress (Neetu Kapoor), Best Supporting Actor (Paul) and Best Female Debut (Koli), and won two awards – Best Supporting Actor (Anil Kapoor) and Best Female Playback Singer (Kavita Seth for "Rangisari").

== Plot ==
Kuldeep "Kukoo" Saini and Nainaa Sharma marry each other, having loved each other ever since they had gone to school together. The couple relocates to Toronto, Canada for Nainaa's job in a corporate company while Kukoo is employed as a bouncer in a nightclub. Within five years, the couple's marital life gets strained due to prolonged silences, unfinished conversations and resentful hearts while Nainaa is offered a new position as the vice-president of HR in New York City and Kukoo is frustrated with his job. On their wedding anniversary, Nainaa and Kukoo confess to each other about their stressed marital lives and plan to divorce each other once Kukoo's sister Ginny is married. They fly to their hometown of Patiala, India to attend Ginny's wedding with Baljeet and are received by Kukoo's happy parents Bheem and Geeta and Ginny. Nainaa and Kukoo pretend to be happy, unwilling to disturb the vibes of Ginny's marriage while Ginny has conflicted feelings for her former boyfriend, Gaurav.

As Nainaa's boss urges her to decide soon about her promotion, she insists that Kukoo reveal their divorce plan to his parents. Kukoo parties with his father Bheem and tries to tell him about his plans to get separated from Nainaa but rather learns that Bheem intends to divorce Geeta after Ginny's wedding. Puzzled, Kukoo attempts to confront Bheem and is informed of the latter's extramarital affair with Kukoo's mathematics teacher in 12th grade, Meera. Meanwhile, Nainaa becomes frustrated when the women of the house arrange a small prayer for her to bear children and angrily discloses her plans to get separated from Kukoo to her mother and Geeta. Next morning, a shocked Geeta confronts Kukoo and Nainaa and tries convincing them to sort their problems out. Frustrated when Bheem tries to do the same as Geeta, Kukoo reveals Bheem's affair with Meera to Geeta and Nainaa, shattering the former while Bheem fakes a heart stroke and requests the doctor, their family friend, to play along with his act.

Meanwhile, Geeta plans to unite Bheem and Meera after Ginny's wedding and informs them, Nainaa and Kukoo of the same at a temple much to everyone's despair. Due to Geeta's act, Kukoo picks an argument with her and Nainaa at home, leaves the house and drinks with Gurpreet, his best friend, confidant and Nainaa's elder brother. At night, Bheem leaves the house to live with Meera but the latter doesn't wish to be with him as she feels that she could never be like Geeta. When Kukoo meets Bheem on the road, the latter pretends to have left Meera for good and realized that Geeta is his better half. Convinced of his act, Geeta forgives Bheem while Ginny, who is unaware of all the drama taking place at her home, arranges for her parents to renew their wedding vows on the occasion of their wedding anniversary. On the day of Geeta and Bheem's re-wedding, Kukoo and Gurpreet call Meera to mock her as Bheem "kicked her out" in favour of Geeta but realize that it was Meera who rejected Bheem. Infuriated by his father, Kukoo simultaneously discloses it all publicly and insults Bheem, for which Geeta slaps Kukoo but ultimately decides to file for divorce.

Having learnt of Kukoo and Nainaa's plans of divorce and her parents' conflict, Ginny bursts out about her insecurity in marrying Baljeet as she still loves someone else while she was all along ready to marry Baljeet as Geeta had once assured her that everything would be right after marriage whereas it did not work out for both the couples. The divorce proceedings begin for both the couples. While Bheem and Geeta are given six months by the court to reconsider, Kukoo refuses to accept for divorce, apologizing to Nainaa for not being part of her success all along and being jealous of it instead. They reconcile and set to leave for New York City while Bheem plans to reconcile with Geeta within these six months, having realized his selfishness and also thinks of having Ginny marry Gaurav.

== Cast ==
- Anil Kapoor as Bheem Saini
- Neetu Kapoor as Geeta Saini
- Varun Dhawan as Kuldeep "Kukoo" Saini
- Kiara Advani as Nainaa Saini
- Maniesh Paul as Gurpreet Sharma
- Prajakta Koli as Ginny Saini
- Tisca Chopra as Meera Malhotra
- Varun Sood as Gaurav Kapoor
- Savant Singh Premi as Baljeet "Ballu" Sodhi
- Naman Arora as Vishal Verma
- Suparna Marwah as Nainaa and Gurpreet's mother
- Elnaaz Norouzi - special appearance in the song "Duppata"

== Production ==
Principal photography commenced on 16 November 2020 in Chandigarh. The shooting wrapped up in November 2021.

== Release ==
Jugjugg Jeeyo was released in theatres on 24 June 2022 in 3,375 screens with 11,384 shows per day. It premiered digitally on 22 July 2022 on Amazon Prime Video.

=== Lawsuit ===
On 21 June 2022, Vishal Singh, a writer from Ranchi, India, accused Karan Johar of plagiarizing the plot for Jugjugg Jeeyo. Singh claimed the story was copied from his story Punny Rani, demanding Rs. 1.5 crores in compensation. As of 23 June 2022, the matter was before a local court.

== Soundtrack ==
Jugjugg Jeeyo

Soundtrack album by Tanishk Bagchi, Kanishk Seth - Kavita Seth, Diesby, Pozy and Vishal Shelke
- Released: 24 June 2022
- Genre: Feature film soundtrack
- Length: 31:37
- Language: Hindi
- Label: T-Series
- Producer: Bhushan Kumar

Official audio
- Jugjugg Jeeyo - Full Album on YouTube

The music of the film is composed by Tanishk Bagchi, Kanishk Seth - Kavita Seth, Diesby, Pozy and Vishal Shelke with lyrics written by Tanishk Bagchi, Abrar-ul-Haq, Diesby, Shamsher Sandhu, Ginny Diwan, Dhruv Yogi and Ghulam Mohd. Khavar.

The first song, titled "The Punjaabban Song", was recreated by Tanishk Bagchi from the 2002 Pakistani music album Nach Punjaban by Abrar-ul-Haq.

The second song, "Rangisari", is a re-release of the song "Rangi Saari" by Kavita Seth - Kanishk Seth, recreated from the late classical vocalist Shobha Gurtu’s popular thumri.

The third song, "Duppata", was a recreated version of the 1994 hit Punjabi song Dupatta Tera Satrang Da, composed by Atul Sharma, written by Shamsher Sandhu and sung by Surjit Bindrakhia. The remix version is sung by Diesby, Chapter 6 and Shreya Sharma, with Diesby writing and composing the remix.

The fourth song, "Nain Ta Heere", is an original romantic number sung by Guru Randhawa and Asees Kaur with lyrics by Ghulam Mohd. Khavar translated by Kumaar. The song marks composer Vishal Shelke's debut, and replaced a song "Ik Mulaqaat" originally composed and written by Mithoon, which would have marked the composer's first collaboration with Dharma Productions. A version of the song, released only as Instagram reel audio, was sung by Advani.

Track listing
No.	Title	Lyrics	Music	Singer(s)	Length
1.	"Jugjugg Jeeyo"	Tanishk Bagchi	Tanishk Bagchi	Tanishk Bagchi	2:22
2.	"The Punjaabban Song"	Tanishk Bagchi, Abrar-ul-Haq	Tanishk Bagchi, Abrar-Ul-Haq	Gippy Grewal, Zahrah S Khan, Tanishk Bagchi, Romy & Abrar-ul-Haq	3:19
3.	"Rangisari"	Traditional	Kanishk Seth, Kavita Seth	Kanishk Seth, Kavita Seth	3:43
4.	"Tum Jo Gaye" (Male Version)	Ginny Diwan	Pozy	Pozy	2:24
5.	"Rok Leyy"	Dhruv Yogi	Tanishk Bagchi	Simiran Kaur Dhadli	2:52
6.	"Nain Ta Heere"	Ghulam Mohd. Khavar	Vishal Shelke	Guru Randhawa, Asees Kaur	3:36
7.	"Tum Jo Gaye" (Female Version)	Ginny Diwan	Pozy	Swati Sharma	2:25
8.	"Duppata"	Diesby, Shamsher Sandhu	Diesby	Diesby, Shreya Sharma	3:40
9.	"Jaise Savan"	Tanishk Bagchi	Tanishk Bagchi	Tanishk Bagchi, Zahrah S Khan	3:43
10.	"Nain Ta Heere" (Lisa Version)	Ghulam Mohd. Khavar, Kumaar	Vishal Shelke	Lisa Mishra, Guru Randhawa	3:33
Total length:					31:37

== Reception ==
=== Box office ===
It earned ₹9.28 crores at the domestic box office on its opening day. On the second day, the film collected ₹10.55 crore. On the third day, the film collected ₹12.10 crore, taking a total domestic opening weekend of ₹28.93 crore.

As of 5 August 2022, the film grossed ₹101.23 crore (US$11 million) in India and ₹34.90 crore (US$3.6 million) overseas, for a worldwide gross collection of ₹136.13 crore (US$14 million).

=== Critical reception ===
Jugjugg Jeeyo received mixed reviews from critics. On the review aggregator website Rotten Tomatoes, 45% of 11 critics' reviews are positive, with an average rating of 5.3/10.

Taran Adarsh of Bollywood Hungama rated the film 4 out of 5 stars and wrote, "Jugjugg Jeeyo balances drama, humour and emotions seamlessly." Ronek Kotecha of The Times Of India rated the film 3.5 out of 5 stars and wrote, "Just like its characters, Jugjugg Jeeyo too has its flaws but at the end of the day, it’s all in the family and this is just the kind of wholesome family entertainer." Tushar Joshi of India Today rated the film 3.5 out of 5 stars and wrote, "JugJugg Jeeyo’s biggest strength lies in the fact that it is able to showcase the strength of its entire star cast in the best way possible." Zinia Bandyopadhyay of News 18 rated the film 3.5 out of 5 stars and wrote, "Jugjugg Jeeyo will make you laugh, cry and join the characters on the emotional roller coaster." Himesh Mankad of Pinkvilla rated the film 3.5 out of 5 stars and wrote, "Jug Jugg Jeeyo marries comedy with drama and emotions and is a full on package that will entertain the audience." Sukanya Verma of Rediff rated the film 3 out of 5 stars and wrote, "JugJugg Jeeyo is a David Dhawan comedy, not directed by David Dhawan."

Tina Das of The Print rated the film 3 out of 5 stars and wrote, "Comedy is often not a great tool to discuss tense topics, but Anil Kapoor and Neetu Singh's Jugg Jugg Jeeyo passes the test." Shubhra Gupta of The Indian Express rated the film 2.5 out of 5 stars and wrote, "JugJugg Jeeyo feels like a set-up for a modern-day dive into post-marriage shenanigans." Saibal Chatterjee of NDTV rated the film 2 out of 5 stars and wrote, "Neetu Kapoor strides through the film with striking poise. Full marks to Varun and Kiara for trying to keep up with Anil Kapoor." Anna M. M. Vetticad of Firstpost rated the film 2 out of 5 stars and wrote, "Jugjugg Jeeyo's apologetic feminism aims to cater to both feminists and conservatives. As a consequence, it is neither here nor there and may as well be nowhere." Monika Rawal Kukreja of The Hindustan Times stated, "Varun Dhawan, Kira Advani, Anil Kapoor and Neetu Kapoor bring a fun family drama to life." Anuj Kumar of The Hindu stated, "Director Raj Mehta’s family drama can evoke a few hearty laughs and some animated dinner table discussions, but the movie ends up only scratching the proverbial surface of male entitlement and chauvinism."

== Accolades ==
Award	Date of the ceremony	Category	Recipients	Result	Ref.
Zee Cine Awards	18 March 2023	Best Film	Jugjugg Jeeyo	Nominated	
Zee Cine Awards	18 March 2023	Best Performer of the Year – Male	Varun Dhawan	Won	
Zee Cine Awards	18 March 2023	Best Performer of the Year – Female	Kiara Advani	Won	
Zee Cine Awards	18 March 2023	Best Supporting Actor	Anil Kapoor	Won	
Zee Cine Awards	18 March 2023	Best Supporting Actress	Neetu Kapoor	Nominated	
Zee Cine Awards	18 March 2023	Best Comic Actor	Manish Paul	Won	
Zee Cine Awards	18 March 2023	Best Female Playback Singer	Kavita Seth for "Rangisari"	Won	
Zee Cine Awards	18 March 2023	Song of the Year	"The Punjaabban Song"	Nominated	
Filmfare Awards	28 April 2023	Best Supporting Actor	Anil Kapoor	Won	
Filmfare Awards	28 April 2023	Best Supporting Actor	Manish Paul	Nominated	
Filmfare Awards	28 April 2023	Best Supporting Actress	Neetu Kapoor	Nominated	
Filmfare Awards	28 April 2023	Best Female Debut	Prajakta Koli	Nominated	
Filmfare Awards	28 April 2023	Best Female Playback Singer	Kavita Seth for "Rangisari"	Won	
Filmfare Awards	28 April 2023	Best Choreography	Bosco–Caesar for "Rangisari"	Nominated	
