= Kavita Seth =

Indian singer

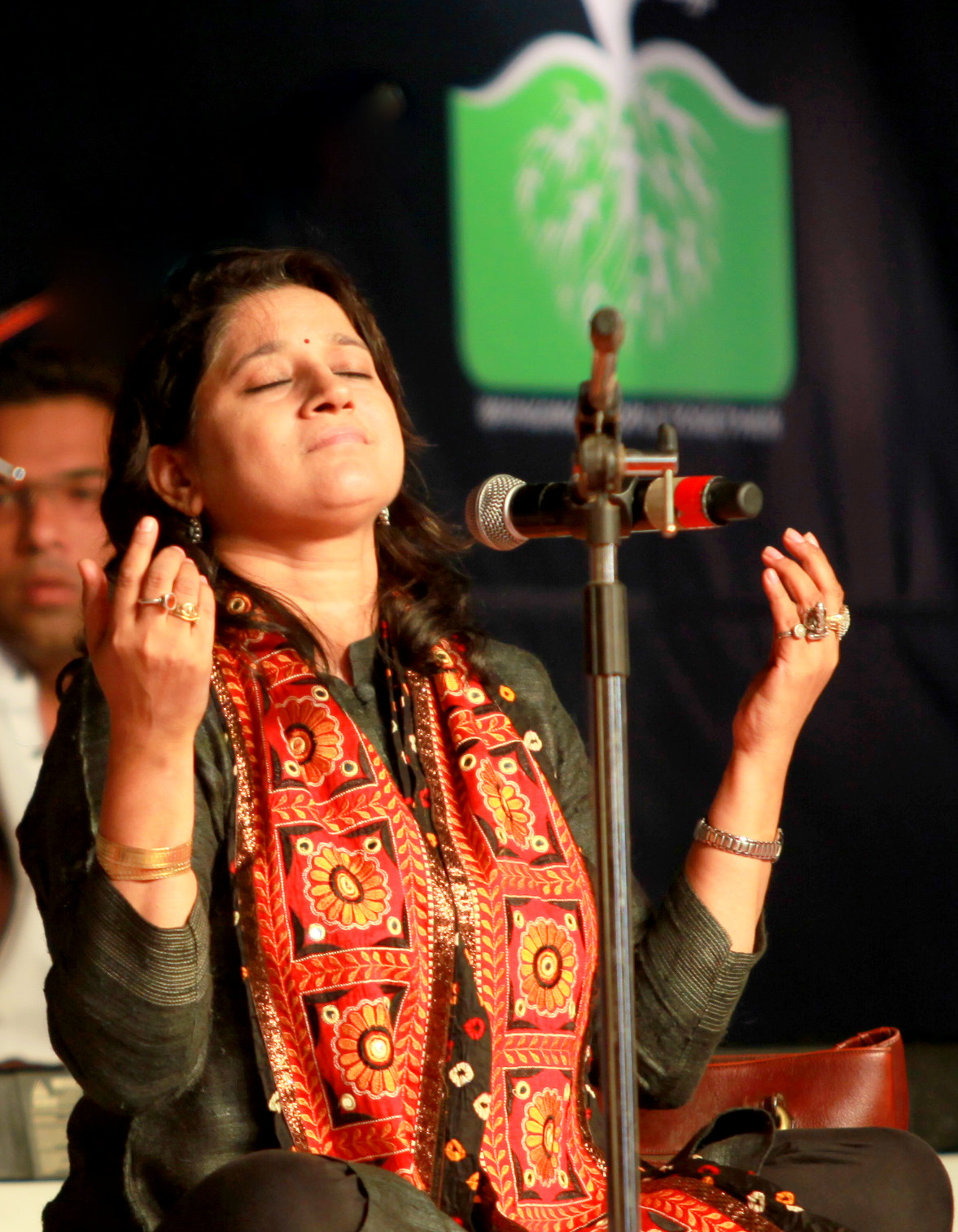

Background information
- Born: 14 September 1970 (age 56); Bareilly, Uttar Pradesh, India
- Genres: Sufi, playback singing
- Occupations: Playback singer, singer of ghazals, Sufi music
- Instrument: Vocals
- Website: www.kavitaseth.com

Kavita Seth (born 14 September 1970) is an Indian singer, who is most known as a playback singer in Hindi cinema, as well as a performer of Ghazals and Sufi music, and leads a Sufi musical group, Karwaan Group.

She has won the Filmfare Award for Best Female Playback Singer twice: in 2010 for her classical Sufi rendition of "Iktara" of the film Wake Up Sid (2009) and in 2023 for "Rangisari" of the film Jugjugg Jeeyo (2022). She also won the Star Screen Award for Best Female Playback for the former, which was one of the biggest chartbusters in 2009. She is the mother of musicians, Kavish Seth and Kanishk Seth.

== Early life ==
She was born in Bareilly, Uttar Pradesh in a middle-class family, to a bank officer father and a homemaker mother.

== Career ==
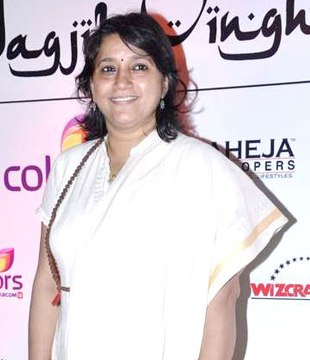
Seth at the Jagjit Singh's anniversary

Kavita specialises in Sufi-style singing although she also sings geet, ghazal and folk songs. Over the years she has performed at live shows at London, Birmingham, Scotland, Berlin, Oslo and Stockholm and places across India. It was at one of her performance at Muzaffar Ali's International Sufi Festival concert, in Delhi that director Satish Kaushik heard her and offered a song "Zindagi ko Maula", in his film, the Amisha Patel starrer, Vaada (2005), marking her debut as a playback singer. Subsequently, she moved to Mumbai, as this was followed by, "Mujhe Mat Roko" in Anurag Basu's Gangster (2006), for which she received praise.

Besides singing she also composes music. She has composed three songs in N. Chandra's film "Yeh Mera India" (2009). She has also released private albums, including, Woh Ek Lamha, Dil-e-Nadan both Sufi ghazal albums, followed by Sufi music albums, Sufiana (2008) and Hazrat. Her 2008 album Sufiana, composed of couplets of Sufi poet-mystic, Rumi was released at the 800-year-old Khaman Pir Ka Dargah in Lucknow.

In 2020, Kavita composed the soundtrack of the BBC TV series A Suitable Boy, while also giving vocals to the songs of Tabu's character in the show. In 2023, Kavita contributed to the album of the movie Gulmohar - starring Sharmila Tagore.

== Personal life ==
She has two sons, Kavish Seth and Kanishk Seth, both of whom perform with her. Her husband K.K. Seth died of pancreatitis on 15 December 2011, aged 48.

== Filmography ==
=== Playback singer ===
Year	Film	Song name	Note
2005	Vaada	"Maula"	
2006	Gangster	"Mujhe Mat Roko"	
2009	Wake Up Sid	"Iktara"	Won- Filmfare Award for Best Female Playback Singer
2009	Yeh Mera India	"Aap Roothe Rahe"	Also Music Director
2009	Yeh Mera India	"Dil Mandir"	Also Music Director
2009	Yeh Mera India	"More Naina"	Also Music Director
2010	Admission Open		
2010	Isi Life Mein!...	"Banno Anne"	
2010	Raajneeti	"Mora Piya (Trance Mix)"	
2011	I Am	"Baangur"	
2011	Trishna	"Raunakein"	
2011	Trishna	"Lagan lagi"	
2011	Trishna	"Khari Khari"	
2012	Cocktail	"Tumhi Ho Bandhu"	Nominated- Filmfare Award for Best Female Playback Singer Nominated- Mirchi Music Award for Female Vocalist of The Year
2012	Cigarette Ki Tarah	"Mujhko Khud Se"	Also Music Director
2013	Bombay Talkies	"Murabba (Duet)"	
2016	Neerja	"Jeete Hain Chal"	
2016	Santheyalli Nintha Kabira	"Navu premada huccharu"	
2016	Waiting	"Zara Zara"	
2017	Begum Jaan	"Prem Mai Tohre"	
2017	Maatr	"Maa Aise Hi"	
2020	A Suitable Boy	"Lutf Woh Ishq Mein"	Web Series; Also music director along with Alex Heffes and Anoushka Shankar
2020	A Suitable Boy	"Mehfil Barkhaast Hui"	Web Series; Also music director along with Alex Heffes and Anoushka Shankar
2020	A Suitable Boy	"Na-Rawa Kahiye"	Web Series; Also music director along with Alex Heffes and Anoushka Shankar
2020	A Suitable Boy	"Muddat Hui Hai"	Web Series; Also music director along with Alex Heffes and Anoushka Shankar
2020	A Suitable Boy	"Dil-E-Nadaan"	Web Series; Also music director along with Alex Heffes and Anoushka Shankar
2020	A Suitable Boy	"Love Has Run Its Course"	Web Series; Also music director along with Alex Heffes and Anoushka Shankar
2020	A Suitable Boy	"Maan in Turmoil"	Web Series; Also music director along with Alex Heffes and Anoushka Shankar
2022	Jugjugg Jeeyo	"Rangisari"	Also Music Director along with Kanishk Seth; Won- Filmfare Award for Best Female Playback Singer
2022	Double XL	"Ki Jaana"	
2024	Mr. & Mrs. Mahi	"Ranjhaana"	
2025	Kesari Chapter 2	"Khumaari"	

=== Music director ===
Film	Year	Notes
Yeh Mera India	2009	
My Friend Pinto	2011	Along with Shamir Tandon
Cigarette ki Tarah	2012	
A Suitable Boy	2020	Web Series; Also music director along with Alex Heffes and Anoushka Shankar
Jugjugg Jeeyo	2022	Along with Kanishk Seth
Kesari Chapter 2	2025	Along with Kanishk Seth

== Albums ==
- Sufiana (2007)
- Kabirana Sufiana (2010)
- Bulleh Shah (2010)
- Khuda Wohi Hai (2011)
- Ek Din (2012)
- Trance With Khusrow (2014)
- Lagan Laagi Re (2021)
