= List of awards and nominations received by Kartik Aaryan =

Kartik Aaryan awards and nominations
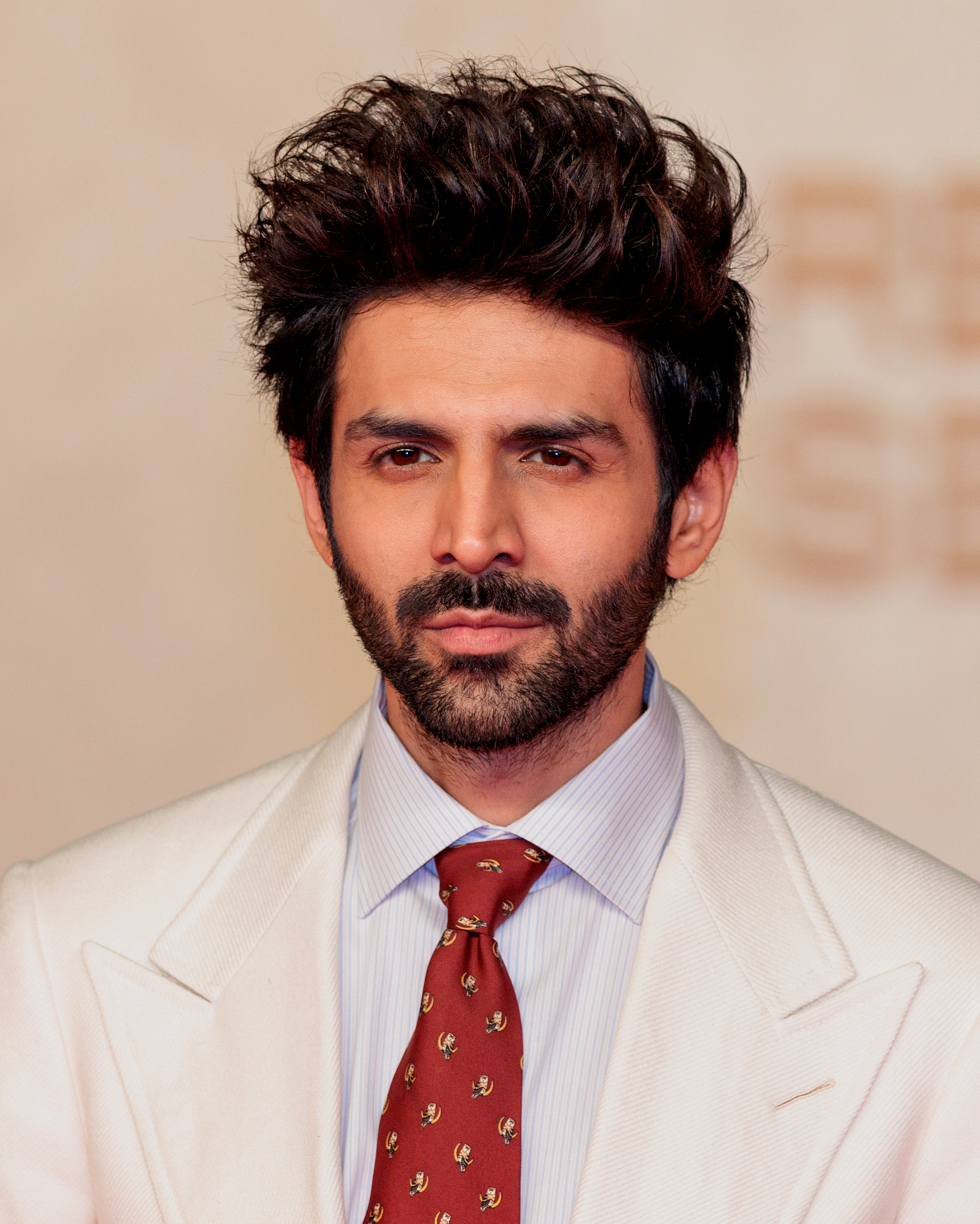
- Aaryan in 2025
Awards and nominations
Award	Wins	Nominations
National Film Awards	1	0
Filmfare Awards	1	2
IIFA Awards	1	2
Zee Cine Awards	6	9
Iconic Gold Awards	4	4
Indian Film Festival of Melbourne	2	2
Indie Film Festival Awards	1	1
Nickelodeon Kids' Choice Awards	3	4
Lions Gold Awards	3	3
Pinkvilla Screen and Style Icons Awards	2	6
Stardust Awards	1	1
News18 Showsha Reel Awards	1	3
Screen Awards	0	2
BIG Star Entertainment Awards	1	2
CNN-IBN Indian of the Year	1	1
Other awards	25	23

Totals (Note: Certain award groups do not simply award one winner. They acknowledge several different recipients, have runners-up, and have third place. Since this is a specific recognition and is different from losing an award, runner-up mentions are considered wins in this award tally. For simplification and to avoid errors, each award in this list has been presumed to have had a prior nomination.)
- Wins: 62
- Nominations: 106

Kartik Aaryan is an Indian actor known for his work predominantly in Hindi films. Aaryan is the recipient of 24 accolades into his credit. He has received Stardust Awards for Best Actor In A Comic Role for the comedy Pyaar Ka Punchnama 2 and Zee Cine Awards for Best Actor in a Comic Role for his performance in Sonu Ke Titu Ki Sweety and Pati Patni Aur Woh. Aaryan earned Best Actor Critics for his performance in Bhool Bhulaiyaa 2 and a nomination at the Filmfare Award for Best Actor for the same.

He received Iconic Gold Awards for Best Actor Critics twice and Filmfare OTT Awards for Best Actor in a Web Original Film (Male) for his critically acclaimed performances in the against type thriller films Dhamaka (2021) and Freddy (2022) respectively.

== Film awards ==
Year	Award	Category	Film	Result	Ref.
2012	Producers Guild Film Awards	Best Male Debut	Pyaar Ka Punchnama	Nominated	
2016	Stardust Awards	Best Actor In A Comic Role	Pyaar Ka Punchnama 2	Won	
2016	Big Star Entertainment Awards	Most Entertaining Ensemble Cast	Pyaar Ka Punchnama 2	Won	
2016	Big Star Entertainment Awards	Most Entertaining Actor in a Comedy Role (Male)	Pyaar Ka Punchnama 2	Nominated	
2016	Producers Guild Film Awards	Best Actor in a Comic Role	Pyaar Ka Punchnama 2	Nominated	
2016	Times of India Film Awards	Best Actor in a Comic Role	Pyaar Ka Punchnama 2	Nominated	
2019	Nickelodeon Kids' Choice Awards India	Dynamic Performer Award	Sonu Ke Titu Ki Sweety	Won	
2019	Zee Cine Awards	Best Actor in a Comic Role	Sonu Ke Titu Ki Sweety	Won	
2019	Zee Cine Awards	Best Actor – Male	Sonu Ke Titu Ki Sweety	Nominated	
2020	Zee Cine Awards	Best Actor in a Comic Role	Pati Patni Aur Woh	Won	
2020	Zee Cine Awards	Viewer's Choice Best Actor – Male	Luka Chuppi	Nominated	
2020	26th Screen Awards	Best Comedian	Luka Chuppi	Nominated	
2022	Filmfare OTT Awards	Best Actor in a Web Original Film (Male)	Dhamaka	Nominated	
2022	Hello Hall Of Fame Awards	Best Actor	Dhamaka	Won	
2022	Iconic Gold Awards	Best Actor Critics	Dhamaka	Won	
2022	Indian Television Academy Awards	Best Actor in a Leading Role	Dhamaka	Won	
2022	Lion Gold Awards	Blockbuster Dhamakedaar Actor of The Year	Bhool Bhulaiyaa 2	Won	
2023	Zee Cine Awards	Best Actor	Bhool Bhulaiyaa 2	Won	
2023	International Indian Film Academy Awards (IIFA)	Best Actor	Bhool Bhulaiyaa 2	Nominated	
2023	Filmfare Awards	Best Actor	Bhool Bhulaiyaa 2	Nominated	
2024	Iconic Gold Awards	Best Actor Critics	Satyaprem Ki Katha	Won	
2024	Zee Cine Awards	Performer of the Year Male	Satyaprem Ki Katha	Won	
2024	News18 Reel Movie Awards	Breakthrough Performance of the Year	Satyaprem Ki Katha	Won	
2024	Pinkvilla Screen and Style Icons Awards	Best Actor (Popular Choice)	Satyaprem Ki Katha	Nominated	
2024	Indian Film Festival of Melbourne	Best Actor	Chandu Champion	Won	
2024	Bollywood Hungama India Entertainment Awards	Actor of the Year	Chandu Champion	Won	
2024	CNN-IBN Indian of the Year	Champion of the Year	Chandu Champion	Won	
2024	Galatta Nakshatra Awards	Best Actor of the Year	Chandu Champion	Won	
2025	Iconic Gold Awards	Best Actor (Critics)	Chandu Champion	Won	
2025	Zee Cine Awards	Best Actor – Male	Chandu Champion	Won	
2025	Indie Film Festival Awards	Best Actor	Chandu Champion	Won	
2025	Zee Real Heroes Award	Best Actor	Chandu Champion	Won	
2025	News18 Showsha Reel Awards	Best Actor (male)	Chandu Champion	Nominated	
2025	Iconic Gold Awards	Best Actor (Popular)	Bhool Bhulaiyaa 3	Won	
2025	Zee Real Heroes Award	Best Actor	Bhool Bhulaiyaa 3	Won	
2025	International Indian Film Academy (IIFA) Awards	Best Actor	Bhool Bhulaiyaa 3	Won	
2025	News18 Showsha Reel Awards	Best Actor (male)	Bhool Bhulaiyaa 3	Nominated	
2025	Zee Cine Awards	Viewers' Choice – Best Actor	Bhool Bhulaiyaa 3	Won	
2025	Filmfare Awards	Best Actor	Chandu Champion	Won	
2026	National Film Awards	National Film Award for Best Actor in a Leading Role	Chandu Champion	Won	

== Miscellaneous awards ==
Year	Award / Organisation	Category	Result	Ref.
2018	PETA India	Hottest Vegetarian Celebrity(along with Anushka Sharma)	Won	
2018	Vogue Beauty Awards	Heartthrob of the Year	Won	
2019	Nickelodeon Kids' Choice Awards India	Entertainer of the Year	Won	
2019	Filmfare Glamour And Style Awards	Hotstepper of the Year	Won	
2020	Femina Beauty Awards	Heartthrob of the Year	Won	
2022	Femina Beauty Awards	Superstar of the Year	Won	
2022	Pinkvilla Style Icons Awards	Super Stylish Actor (Male)	Won	
2022	Grazia Millennial Awards	Entertainer of the Year	Won	
2023	Grazia Millennial Awards	Breakthrough Performer of the Year	Nominated	
2023	Bollywood Hungama Style Icons	Most Stylish Actor (Male)	Nominated	
2023	Bollywood Hungama Style Icons	Most Stylish Leading Star (Male)	Won	
2023	Bollywood Hungama Style Icons	Most Stylish Actor People's Choice (Male)	Nominated	

== Honorary awards ==
Organizations	Year	Notes	Result	Ref.
Indian Film Festival of Melbourne	2023	Rising Global Superstar of Indian Cinema	Honoured	
Forbes	2024	Icon of Excellence	Honoured	
Elle	2024	Champion of the Year	Honoured	
International Advertising Association	2025	Brand Endorser of the Year	Honoured	
