= Luv Films =

Indian film production company

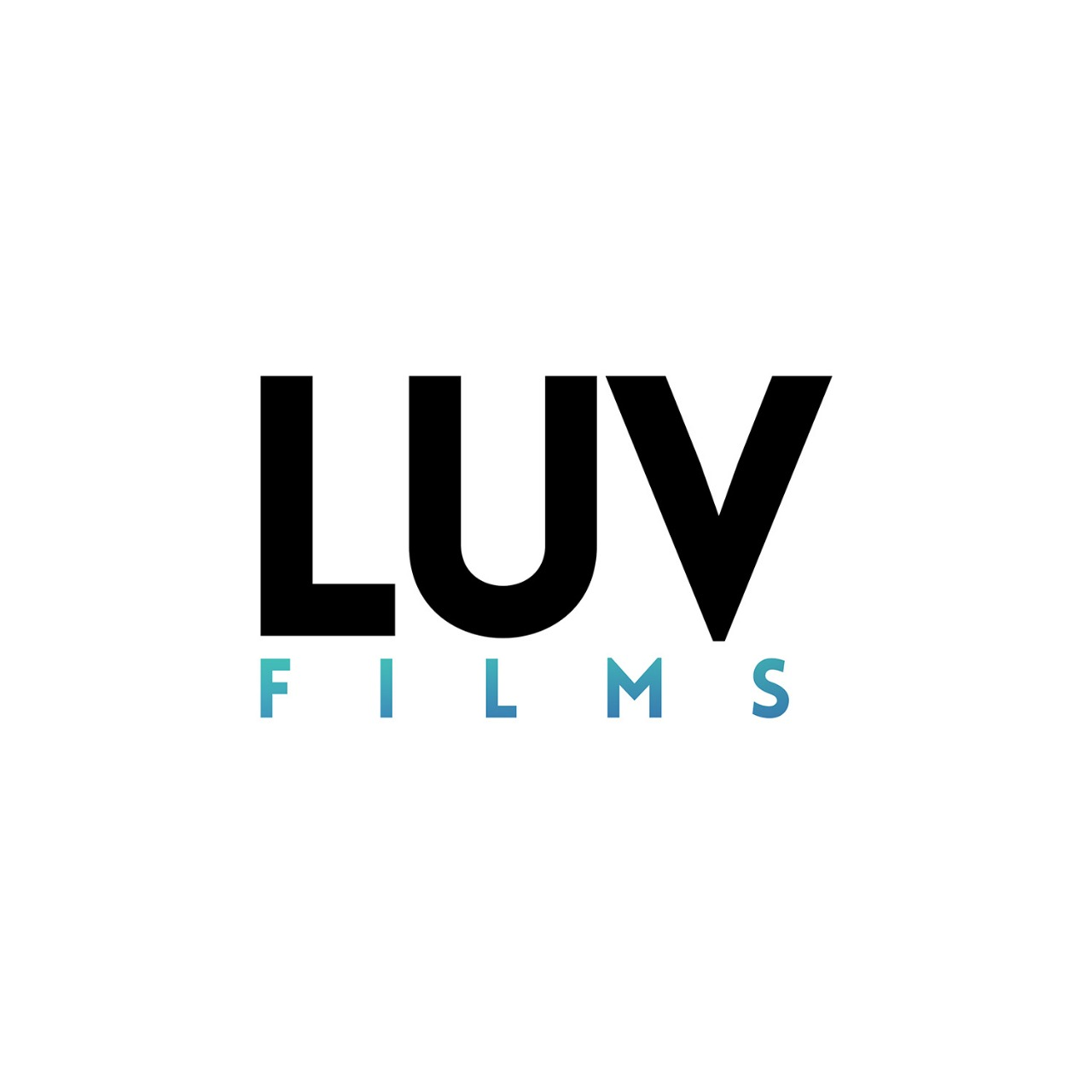
- Type: Limited Liability Partnership; Entertainment
- Founded: 2012
- Headquarters: Mumbai, Maharashtra, India
- Key people: Luv Ranjan; Ankur Garg
- Products: List: Film Production; Film Distribution; Digital Content

Luv Films is an Indian film production house founded by Luv Ranjan and Ankur Garg in 2012. Based in Mumbai the company produces and distributes commercial as well as feature films. It has produced films such as Tu Jhoothi Main Makkaar, Sonu Ki Titu Ki Sweety, Malang - Unleash The Madness, De De Pyaar De, Chhalaang, Vadh and Kuttey.

== Production Ventures ==
=== Luv Films ===
Luv Films co-produced their first film Sonu Ke Titu Ki Sweety, a romantic comedy directed by Luv Ranjan starring Kartik Aaryan, Nushrratt Bharuccha and Sunny Singh that released on 23 February 2018. The film received positive reviews and went on to becoming a humungous box office success in India with its lifetime collection being more than ₹100 crore .

In 2019, Luv Films produced De De Pyaar De, starring Ajay Devgn, Tabu and Rakul Preet Singh in lead roles which released on 17 May 2019. The film was the directorial debut of the well-known film editor Akiv Ali, and was written by Luv Ranjan and Tarun Jain. The romantic comedy garnered thumbs up by the audiences while the film's worldwide gross collections stood at ₹140+ crores.

In 2019, Luv Films collaborated with Mohit Suri to produce a multi starrer-revenge drama, Malang: Unleash The Madness. The film which starred Anil Kapoor, Aditya Roy Kapur, Disha Patani and Kunal Khemu was released on 7 February 2020. After a successful run the makers decided to make a sequel called Malang 2.

Luv Films first OTT collaboration with Amazon Prime Video 'Chhalaang' released on 13 November 2020. The film was a sports comedy directed by Hansal Mehta, starring Rajkummar Rao and Nushrratt Bharuccha in lead roles.

=== Upcoming films ===
Luv Films has announced an upcoming biopic which is based on renowned Indian Cricketer, former India Captain and BCCI President Sourav Ganguly.

== Filmography ==
Key
†	Denotes films that have not yet been released

=== Production ===
Year	Film	Director	Cast	Notes
2016	Life Sahi Hai	Tarun Jain	Siddhant Chaturvedi, Suhail Nayyar, Tarun Jain, Abhishek Saha	Web Series
2018	Sonu Ke Titu Ki Sweety	Luv Ranjan	Kartik Aaryan, Nushrat Bharucha, Sunny Singh	Co-produced with T-Series Films
2019	De De Pyaar De	Akiv Ali	Ajay Devgn, Tabu, Rakul Preet Singh	Co-produced with T-Series Films
2020	Jai Mummy Di	Navjot Gulati	Sunny Singh, Sonnalli Seygall	Co-produced with T-Series Films
2020	Malang	Mohit Suri	Anil Kapoor, Aditya Roy Kapur, Disha Patani, Kunal Khemu	Co-produced with T-Series Films & Northern Lights Entertainment.
2020	Chhalaang (Note: Released on Amazon Prime Video.)	Hansal Mehta	Rajkummar Rao, Nushrratt Bharuccha	Co-produced with T-Series Films & Ajay Devgn FFilms
2022	Vadh	Jaspal Singh Sandhu, Rajeev Barnwal	Sanjay Mishra, Neena Gupta	Co-produced with T-Series Films, J Studio & Next Level Production
2023	Kuttey	Aasmaan Bhardwaj	Arjun Kapoor, Konkona Sen Sharma, Naseeruddin Shah, Kumud Mishra, Radhika Madan, Shardul Bhardwaj, Tabu	Co-produced with T-Series Films & Vishal Bhardwaj Films
2023	Tu Jhoothi Main Makkaar	Luv Ranjan	Ranbir Kapoor, Shraddha Kapoor	Co-produced with T-Series Films
2024	Wild Wild Punjab (Note: Released on Netflix.)	Simarpreet Singh	Varun Sharma, Manjot Singh, Jassi Gill, Sunny Singh	Co-produced with T-Series Films
2025	Devmanus	Tejas Prabha Vijay Deoskar	Mahesh Manjrekar, Renuka Shahane, Subodh Bhave, Siddharth Bodke	Marathi film
2025	Ufff Yeh Siyapaa	G. Ashok	Sohum Shah, Nushrratt Bharuccha, Nora Fatehi, Omkar Kapoor, Sharib Hashmi	
2025	De De Pyaar De 2	Anshul Sharma	Ajay Devgn, Rakul Preet Singh, R. Madhavan, Jaaved Jaaferi, Meezaan Jafri, Gautami Kapoor	Co-produced with T-Series Films
2026	Vadh 2	Jaspal Singh Sandhu	Sanjay Mishra, Neena Gupta, Kumud Mishra, Amitt K. Singh, Akshay Dogra, Shilpa Shukla, Yogita Bihani	
2026	Cocktail 2	Homi Adajania	Shahid Kapoor, Kriti Sanon, Rashmika Mandanna	Co-produced with Maddock Films
2026	Pehla Pyaar Doosri Baar	Anuj Saini	Alisha Chopra, Sparsh Walia, Sakshi Vaidya, Kunal Vaid, Sargun Kaur Luthra, Thushar Chhibber	
2027	Dada: The Sourav Ganguly Story †	Vikramaditya Motwane	Rajkummar Rao	Co-produced with T-Series Films, DBL
