= De De Pyaar De =

2019 Indian film by Akiv Ali

- Theatrical release poster
- Directed by: Akiv Ali
- Written by: Luv Ranjan; Tarun Jain
- Screenplay by: Surabhi Bhatnagar
- Story by: Luv Ranjan
- Produced by: Bhushan Kumar; Krishan Kumar; Luv Ranjan; Ankur Garg
- Starring: Ajay Devgn; Tabu; Rakul Preet Singh
- Cinematography: Sudhir K. Chaudhary
- Edited by: Akiv Ali; Chetan M. Solanki
- Music by: Songs: Amaal Mallik; Rochak Kohli; Tanishk Bagchi; Vipin Patwa; Manj Musik; Score: Hitesh Sonik
- Production companies: T-Series Films; Luv Films
- Distributed by: AA Films; Yash Raj Films (Overseas)
- Release date: 17 May 2019
- Running time: 135 minutes
- Country: India
- Language: Hindi
- Budget: ₹75 crore
- Box office: ₹143.04 crore

De De Pyaar De (transl. Give Me Love) is a 2019 Indian Hindi-language romantic comedy film written by Luv Ranjan and directed by Akiv Ali in his directorial debut. Produced by T-Series Films and Luv Films, it stars Ajay Devgn, Tabu and Rakul Preet Singh in the lead roles. The first instalment of a duology, it follows the chaos that ensues when a middle-aged NRI and would-be divorcé is smitten with a woman almost half his age and introduces her to his family, including his estranged wife and children.

Pre-production began in February 2017, and filming commenced on 19 January 2018 in Mumbai. The production further took place in London and Kullu Manali, before wrapping up in August 2018. The film was released on 17 May 2019, and was a commercial success, grossing ₹143 crore (US$15 million) worldwide.

A sequel, De De Pyaar De 2, was released in November 2025 as the second and final instalment of the duology.

== Plot ==
Ashish Mehra is a 50-year-old NRI investor in London who meets a 26-year-old woman, Ayesha Khurana. The two fall in love and have sex. Soon they start living together. Ashish informs her that he is separated from his wife Manju, who lives in India with their children, Ishika and Ishaan. After a back and forth regarding their age gap, Ashish decides to introduce Ayesha to his family and takes her to his home in Manali. Manju and their children are now living with Ashish's parents. Ishika is irritated by her father's arrival, believing that he will ruin the meeting with her boyfriend Rishi and his father Atul Saxena.

Startled, Ashish lies that Ayesha is his secretary, much to her chagrin. Ayesha and Manju feel tension over their feelings for Ashish. Due to circumstances, Ashish is introduced as Manju's brother to Rishi and Atul. Ayesha and Manju fail to get along with each other. After finally noticing that Ayesha and Ashish are together, Ishika shouts at her father for lying to his entire family. Ashish finally reveals that he brought Ayesha to gain his family's approval. Atul also learns the truth and calls off Ishika and Rishi's wedding, as he feels the family is not reliable. Manju defends Ashish and Ayesha’s relationship in front of their entire family, following which Ashish also consoles Manju and sleeps with her.

The next morning, Ayesha finds out that Manju and Ashish slept together, and Manju responds that she is still his wife and Ayesha is technically the other woman. Disheartened, Ayesha returns to London. Ashish convinces Atul for the marriage between Ishika and Rishi, but begins missing Ayesha. When Ishika's engagement arrangements are in full swing, Manju realises the true longing the couple have for each other and goes to London to ask Ayesha to give Ashish a second chance. Ayesha reconciles with Ashish and celebrates Ishika's engagement. In a post-credits scene, Ashish and Ayesha argue on whether they should meet Ayesha’s family, setting the stage for another encounter.

== Cast ==
- Ajay Devgn as Ashish "Ashu" Mehra
- Tabu as Manju Mehra; Ashish's wife
- Rakul Preet Singh as Ayesha Khurana; Ashish's love interest
- Jimmy Shergill as Vakil Kapoor "V.K"
- Alok Nath as Veerendra Mehra; Ashish's father
- Kumud Mishra as Atul Saxena
- Madhumalti Kapoor as Suman Mehra; Ashish's mother
- Inayat Sood as Ishika Mehra; Ashish's daughter
- Bhavin Bhanushali as Ishaan Mehra; Ashish's son
- Rajveer Singh as Rishi Saxena; Atul's son
- Radhika Bangia as Hema
- Javed Jaffrey as Ronak Motla, Ashish's friend (special appearance)
- Sunny Singh as Akash, Ayesha’s ex-boyfriend (special appearance)

== Production ==
=== Development and casting ===
In February 2017, Luv Ranjan confirmed that Ajay Devgn had committed to star in an untitled "urban comedy" film to be written by Ranjan and produced by Ranjan and Ankur Garg. The "contemporary rom-com" was to be helmed by film editor Akiv Ali, who had previously worked as editor on all three of Ranjan's films upto that point, among others, in his directorial debut. Devgn played a 50-year-old in the film, the first time he played a character his real age; he attributed it to "meatier roles.. being written for actors of [his] age [so that the] audience accepts it". It was also his first romance film in years. Devgn mentioned that the film's premise followed "strong woman characters[,] and there's also a nice message".

In May 2017, a member of the film's crew confirmed that Tabu was confirmed to play one of the film's female leads opposite Devgn, marking her seventh collaboration with the actor; their last production together at the time was Golmaal Again (2017). According to Tabu, the film highlights the differences in "[t]he way a mid-40s couple deals with their relationship, their definition of love and relationship will be different than a 27-year-old woman. Her insecurities are different and issues are varied". Jimmy Sheirgill's inclusion in the cast in a supporting role as the love interest of Tabu's character, was confirmed in late April 2018. Sheirgill had previously shared screen space with Tabu for the 1996 film Maachis, which was also his film debut.

After the success of their maiden collaboration on the sleeper hit Sonu Ke Titu Ki Sweety (2018), Luv Films (owned by Ranjan and Garg) and Bhushan Kumar of T-Series formed a mutual understanding to continue their collaboration by co-producing a series of films, the first of which was De De Pyaar De. In mid-January 2018, Rakul Preet Singh, who had earlier made her debut with the T-Series production Yaariyan, was signed in as a female lead opposite Devgn. According to Ranjan, Singh's "natural persona fit[ted] the character to the tee". In February 2018, Singh confirmed her casting and said she had "a meaty role", but couldn't reveal more details at the time.

=== Principal photography ===
Principal photography commenced on 19 January 2018 at Mumbai, with Ranjan's frequent collaborator Sudhir K. Chaudhary handling the cinematography. The film had a production budget of ₹500 million. Aside from direction, Ali also shared editing duties with debutante Chetan M. Solanki, who was one of his former associates on Sonu Ke Titu Ki Sweety and Pyaar Ka Punchnama 2; Solanki would later become his co–editor on Ranjan's next, Tu Jhoothi Main Makkaar (2023). In June 2018, Singh revealed that close to 50 percent of filming was completed at that point. The next shooting schedule of the film commenced in July 2018 at London. In August 2018, Devgn and Singh began their next schedule in Kullu Manali Circuit. By August 2018, filming was completed and post-production work commenced.

== Music ==
De De Pyaar De

Soundtrack album by Amaal Mallik, Rochak Kohli, Tanishk Bagchi, Vipin Patwa and Manj Musik
- Released: 11 April 2019
- Recorded: 2018–19
- Genre: Feature film soundtrack
- Length: 34:35
- Language: Hindi
- Label: T-Series
External audio
- Official Audio Jukebox on YouTube

The film's soundtrack was composed by Amaal Mallik, Rochak Kohli, Tanishk Bagchi, Vipin Patwa and Manj Musik, with lyrics written by Kumaar, Kunaal Vermaa, Garry Sandhu, Mellow D and Tanishk Bagchi. It was released by T-Series on 15 May 2019.

Tanishk Bagchi recreated Garry Sandhu's single Yeah Baby as "Hauli Hauli" with additional voice of Neha Kakkar and rap by Mellow D.

Manj Musik recreated Surjit Bindarikhia's track Mukhda Vekh Ke in the voice of Mika Singh and Dhvani Bhanushali.

Shreya Paul of Firstpost wrote that the music is "as problematic as the plot seems to be", noting that it "doesn't do much to evoke any worthy reaction from listeners, except for maybe a sigh of disappointment". Paul, however, praised "Dil Royi Jaye" for "stand[ing] apart" from the rest of the songs.

Track listing
No.	Title	Lyrics	Music	Singer(s)	Length
1.	"Vaddi Sharaban"	Kumaar	Vipin Patwa	Sunidhi Chauhan, Navraj Hans	4:26
2.	"Tu Mila To Haina"	Kunaal Vermaa	Amaal Mallik	Arijit Singh	5:25
3.	"Hauli Hauli"	Tanishk Bagchi, Garry Sandhu, Mellow D	Tanishk Bagchi	Garry Sandhu, Neha Kakkar, Rap by: Mellow D	3:29
4.	"Chale Aana"	Kunaal Vermaa	Amaal Mallik	Armaan Malik	4:31
5.	"Mukhda Vekh Ke"	Kumaar	Manj Musik	Mika Singh, Dhvani Bhanushali	2:49
6.	"Dil Royi Jaye"	Kumaar	Rochak Kohli	Arijit Singh	4:16
7.	"Vaddi Sharaban" (Talli Mix)	Kumaar	Vipin Patwa	Sunidhi Chauhan, Navraj Hans	4:08
8.	"Tu Mila To Haina" (Version 2)	Kunaal Vermaa	Amaal Mallik	Atif Aslam	5:31
Total length:					34:35

== Marketing ==
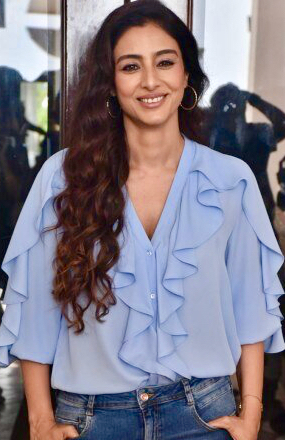
Tabu promoting De De Pyaar De in 2019

The film's first look poster, which depicted Devgn perched atop two cars with the leading ladies, was released on 22 March 2019. The official trailer was released on 2 April 2019, on the occasion of Devgn's 50th birthday. A writer for Hindustan Times wrote of the trailer, "Ajay Devgn's birthday gift to his fans is a laugh riot". Similarly, Pranita Chaubey of NDTV commented that it "will tickle your funny bone". The song "Vaddi Sharaban" was released on 11 April 2019. Next, another song, "Tu Mila To Haina" was released on 22 April 2019. "Hauli Hauli", which was released on 26 April 2019, was a remix of the original by Hauli Hauli by Garry Sandhu. Sandhu re-sung the song with additional vocals from Neha Kakkar. The song "Chale Aana" was released on 2 May 2019.

== Release ==
De De Pyaar De was first scheduled to release on 26 April 2019; after the release of Avengers: Endgame (2019) in India was also revealed to be on the same day, the release was preponed to 15 March 2019. Later on, to avoid competition from Total Dhamaal, another film starring Devgn which was to release on 22 February 2019, the film was indefinitely postponed, and the release was later revealed to be on 17 May 2019. The British Board of Film Classification (BBFC) certified the film with a runtime of 135 minutes. It opened for paid previews on 16 May, one day prior to its theatrical release.

== Reception ==
=== Box office ===
On its first day of release in India, the film earned ₹8.5 crore nett, which was lower than trade expectations. On the second day, however, collections rose by 50 percent to ₹12.5 crore nett, owing to positive word-of-mouth. The film earned ₹14 crore nett on the third day. On its first Monday, it maintained a strong hold with earnings of ₹5.85 crore nett. It dropped slightly on Tuesday to earn ₹5.5 crore nett. The earnings on Wednesday were ₹5.15 crore nett. On Friday, the film collected ₹3.25 crore nett. It showed growth of 45 percent on Saturday to earn ₹4.5 crore nett. On its second Monday, the film earned ₹2.5 crore nett. Tuesday collections dropped slightly to ₹2.25 crore nett. It has grossed ₹143 crore worldwide, with gross of ₹123.38 crore in India and ₹19.66 crore from overseas.

=== Critical response ===
De De Pyaar De received mixed reviews from critics. On the review aggregator website Rotten Tomatoes, 21% of 14 critics' reviews are positive, with an average rating of 5.1/10.

Taran Adarsh of Bollywood Hungama gave 4/5 stars and praised all aspects of production, concluding, "On the whole, De De Pyaar De is a paisa vasool entertainer with plenty of laugh aloud moments and strong emotions as its USP". Anita Iyer of Khaleej Times gave 2/5 stars and felt that the "[l]ack of a storyline is hardly compensated by the presence of the stars on board". Manjusha Radhakrishnan of Gulf News gave 3/5 stars and wrote "[I]f you can ignore [the female leads'] questionable choice in men, there's a lot to enjoy in De De Pyaar De". Raja Sen of Hindustan Times gave 2.5/5 stars and felt that Devgn delivered his "sincerest performance", while Stutee Ghosh of The Quint gave 3/5 stars and wrote that the film "owes a lot to Ajay Devgn and Tabu's chemistry".

Ronak Kotecha of The Times of India gave 3.5/5 stars and was impressed with the film for "reinstat[ing] the fact that when it comes to love, age is just a number." Meena Iyer of Daily News and Analysis concurred, opining that it "nicely captures frailties in human relationships". Mayur Sanap of Deccan Chronicle gave 2.5/5 stars and wrote "Despite its bright premise and superlative cast, the Akiv Ali directorial isn't as smart as it aspires to be." Similarly, Mayank Shekhar of Mid-Day gave the film 1.5/5 stars and lamented, "It's almost like the filmmakers are certain the intended audience won't connect much with such a young-old love, by itself, in a single screen theatre". Gaurang Chauhan of Times Now rated 3/5 stars and attributed the film's strength to strong performances. Shubhra Gupta of The Indian Express gave 2.5/5 stars and felt the film was "a mixed bag", stating, "You wish the film had been braver in its intention of creating a really cracking rom-com, instead of playing its clichés for a laugh".

Anna M. M. Vetticad of Firstpost gave 1/5 stars and opined it was "a vehicle for claims of universal male victimhood, better disguised than its co-producer and co-writer Luv Ranjan's three directorial ventures that have struck box office gold in the past decade". Nandini Ramnath of Scroll felt the film's "biggest achievement is that it might actually compel filmmakers to ask whether their leads are appropriately matched wrinkle for wrinkle rather than forcing chronological acrobatics on viewers". Kunal Guha of Mumbai Mirror wrote, "The build-up gets dangerously close to that tipping point from where on expects it to nose-dive, but it doesn't". Charu Thakur of India Today praised Tabu's performance as "light[ing] up every frame with her presence, and [a] comic timing.. par excellence. Reshu Manglik of India TV gave 1/5 stars and called it "[a] shapeless tale of unusual love story that takes you nowhere".

== Sequel ==
A sequel titled De De Pyaar De 2 starring Devgn, Singh and Jaaferi in their respective original roles with R. Madhavan, Meezaan Jafri, Gautami Kapoor, and Ishita Dutta as new additions, was released on 14 November 2025. The sequel, featuring the same producers and writers, was directed by creative producer Anshul Sharma, who replaced Ali; Solanki also reprised his editing duties alone with Ali not returning to edit.
