= Silvat =

2016 short film by Faraz Arif Ansari

- Directed by: Tanuja Chandra
- Written by: Faraz Arif Ansari
- Produced by: Shailja Kejriwal; Aparna Sud
- Starring: Kartik Aaryan; Meher Mistry
- Cinematography: Saurabh Goswami
- Edited by: Akshara Prabhakar
- Music by: Anuraag Dhoundeyal
- Production company: Zee Entertainment Enterprises
- Release date: 2018
- Running time: 42 minutes
- Country: India
- Language: Hindi

Silvat is an Indian Hindi-language romantic drama short film under the Zeal For Unity festival 2016. It is written by Faraz Arif Ansari and directed by Tanuja Chandra, starring Kartik Aaryan and Meher Mistry in the leading roles. Kartik Aaryan shot this short film while filming Pyaar Ka Punchnama 2.

== Plot ==
Noor, a married woman, falls in love with Anwar, a tailor. However, they never express their feelings as she awaits her husband's return from Riyadh.

== Cast ==
- Kartik Aaryan as Anwar Khan
- Meher Mistry as Noor

== Release ==
The film was released on Zindagi channel on 12 June 2016, and available for streaming on ZEE5.

== Reception ==
=== Critical reception ===
Anvita Singh reviewed for The Indian Express said: Silvat is made up of such touching and telling moments, and effectively conveys the pain, tension and little pleasures of first love.

Anita Britto of SpotboyE rated 3 stars out of five and wrote "With a well-written script and immersive narrative, Silvat takes you to another world. A world where no one fights for their love."
