= Zee Cine Award for Best Actor in a Comic Role =

Film award in India

Zee Cine Award Best Actor in a Comic Role
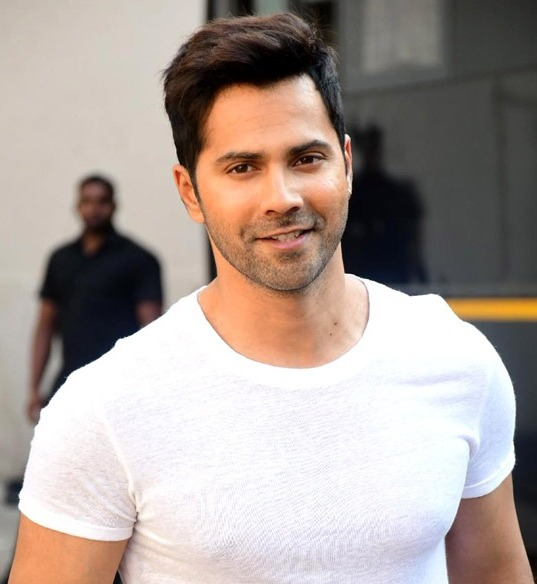
- The 2026 recipient: Varun Dhawan
- Awarded for: Best Performance by an Actor in a Comic Role
- Country: India
- Presented by: Zee Entertainment Enterprises
- First award: Kamal Hassan, Chachi 420 (1998)
- Currently held by: Varun Dhawan, Sunny Sanskari Ki Tulsi Kumari (2026)
- Website: Zee Cine Awards

The Zee Cine Award Best Actor in a Comic Role is chosen by a jury organized by Zee Entertainment Enterprises, and the winner is announced at the ceremony.

== Multiple wins ==
| Wins | Recipient |
|---|---|
| 2 | Govinda, Paresh Rawal, Riteish Deshmukh, Arshad Warsi, Kartik Aaryan |

== Winners ==
| Year | Winner | Film | Ref. |
|---|---|---|---|
| 1998 | Kamal Haasan | Chachi 420 | |
| 1999 | Govinda | Bade Miyan Chote Miyan | |
| 2000 | Govinda | Haseena Maan Jaayegi | |
| 2001 | Paresh Rawal | Hera Pheri | |
| 2002 | Johnny Lever | Love Ke Liye Kuchh Bhi Karega | |
| 2003 | Paresh Rawal | Awara Paagal Deewana | |
| 2004 | Arshad Warsi | Munnabhai M.B.B.S. | |
| 2005 | Riteish Deshmukh | Masti | |
| 2006 | Riteish Deshmukh | Bluffmaster! | |
| 2007 | Arshad Warsi | Lage Raho Munna Bhai | |
| 2008 | Vinay Pathak | Bheja Fry | |
| 2009 | Not Held | | |
| 2010 | Not Held | | |
| 2011 | Boman Irani | Well Done Abba | |
| 2012 | Divyendu Sharma | Pyaar Ka Punchnama | |
| 2013 | Abhishek Bachchan | Bol Bachchan | |
| 2014 | Varun Sharma | Fukrey | |
| 2015 | Varun Dhawan | Main Tera Hero | |
| 2016 | Nawazuddin Siddiqui | Bajrangi Bhaijaan | |
| 2017 | Rishi Kapoor | Kapoor & Sons | |
| 2019 | Kartik Aaryan | Sonu Ke Titu Ki Sweety | |
| 2020 | Kartik Aaryan | Pati Patni Aur Woh | |
| 2021 | Not Held | | |
| 2022 | Not Held | | |
| 2023 | Maniesh Paul | Jugjugg Jeeyo | |
| 2024 | Ayushmann Khurrana | Dream Girl 2 | |
| 2025 | Abhishek Banerjee | Stree 2 | |
| 2025 | Aparshakti Khurana | Stree 2 | |
| 2026 | Varun Dhawan | Sunny Sanskari Ki Tulsi Kumari | |

== See also ==
- Zee Cine Awards
- Bollywood
- Cinema of India
