= Sunny Singh (actor) =

Indian actor (born 1985)

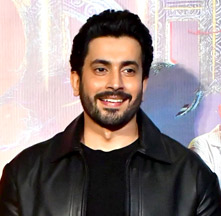
- Singh in 2025
- Born: Sunny Singh Nijjar; 6 October 1985 (age 40); New Delhi, Delhi, India
- Occupation: Actor
- Years active: 2007–present

Sunny Singh Nijjar (born 6 October 1985) is an Indian actor who works primarily in Hindi films. He began acting in 2007 with the television soap opera Kasautii Zindagii Kay. He made his film debut in Paathshaala (2010) and has since starred in Pyaar Ka Punchnama 2 (2015), Sonu Ke Titu Ki Sweety (2018) and Adipurush (2023).

== Early life ==
Singh was born to stunt director Jai Singh Nijjar, who has been a stunt director for numerous films such as Chennai Express (2013) and Shivaay (2016).

== Career ==
Singh made his television debut in 2007 through the Star Plus-popular running series Kasautii Zindagii Kay, where he played the love interest of the character played by Kratika Sengar. Later, he played Karan in the 2009 series Shakuntala.

Singh began his film career in 2010 with Paathshaala where he starred alongside Shahid Kapoor. In 2011 he worked in Madhur Bhandarkar's comedy Dil Toh Baccha Hai Ji, where he made a small appearance in the concluding scene alongside Emraan Hashmi and newcomer Chetna Pande. His first major role was as an abusive husband, Ravi, alongside Kartik Aaryan and Nushrat Bharucha in Luv Ranjan's romantic drama Akaash Vani, which was a commercial failure.

Singh reteamed with Aaryan, Ranjan and Bharucha for Pyaar Ka Punchnama 2, a sequel to the 2011 film Pyaar Ka Punchnama and co-starring Aaryan, Bharucha, Omkar Kapoor, Ishita Raj Sharma and Sonnalli Seygall. With a worldwide total of ₹88 crore (US$9.1 million), it emerged as his first commercial success. His highest-grossing release came in 2018 when he teamed up with the trio for the third time in Sonu Ke Titu Ki Sweety.

Singh had a cameo appearance in Akiv Ali's directorial debut, De De Pyaar De, a romantic comedy film produced by Ranjan, about a 50-year-old businessman who falls in love with a 26-year-old girl, and starring Ajay Devgn opposite Rakul Preet Singh and Tabu. He also starred in Smeep Kang's comedy film Jhootha Kahin Ka alongside Kapoor and Jimmy Sheirgill.

Singh's first release as a lead actor was Pyaar Ka Punchnama 2 producer Abhishek Pathak's directorial debut Ujda Chaman, which was based on the concept of baldness. His performance was appreciated but the film only become a moderate success at the box-office.

He appeared in a cameo role as Durgesh “Doga” Kanojia in 2019 film Pati Patni Aur Woh, starring Kartik Aaryan, Bhumi Pednekar and Ananya Panday.

Singh's third latest release was Jai Mummy Di, a romantic comedy starring Seygall, Supriya Pathak, and Poonam Dhillon. The film, written and directed by Navjot Gulati and produced again by Ranjan, was released on 17 January 2020 to poor response.

In 2023 he played Lakshmana in Adipurush, a film based on Ramayana.

He also starred in Luv Ki Arrange Marriage opposite Avneet Kaur.

== Filmography ==
=== Films ===
Year	Title	Role	Notes	Ref.
2010	Paathshaala	Vicky		
2011	Dil Toh Baccha Hai Ji	Akash Kanwar	Cameo appearance	
2013	Akaash Vani	Ravi Sharma		
2015	Pyaar Ka Punchnama 2	Siddharth "Chauka" Gandotra		
2018	Sonu Ke Titu Ki Sweety	Titu Sharma		
2019	De De Pyaar De	Akash Sehgal	Cameo appearance	
2019	Jhootha Kahin Ka	Karan Pandey		
2019	Ujda Chaman	Chaman Kohli		
2019	Pati Patni Aur Woh	Durgesh "Doga" Kanojia	Cameo appearance	
2020	Jai Mummy Di	Puneet "Punnu" Khanna		
2023	Adipurush	Shesh	Hindi-Telugu bilingual	
2024	Luv Ki Arrange Marriage	Luv Kumar		
2024	Wild Wild Punjab	Maan Arora		
2024	Khel Khel Mein	Hrithik	Voice	
2024	Amar Prem Ki Prem Kahani	Amar		
2025	The Bhootnii	Shantanu		
2025	Single Salma	Meet Singh Sahni		

=== Television ===
Year	Title	Role	Notes	Ref.
2007	Kasautii Zindagii Kay	Saksham		
2007	Dharti Ka Veer Yodha Prithviraj Chauhan	Arjun		
2009	Shakuntala	Karan		

=== Music video appearances ===
Year	Title	Singer(s)	Ref.
2020	"Holi Mein Rangeele"	Mika Singh, Abhinav Shekhar, Pallavi Ishpuniyani	
2022	"Duniya"	B Praak	
2024	"Dhup Lagdi"	Shehnaaz Gill	
