= Raayo S. Bakhirta =

Indian actor

Raayo S. Bakhirta is an Indian actor who works primarily in Hindi-language films. Bakhirta began his acting career with Luv Ranjan's Pyaar Ka Punchnama (2011), in which he played Vikrant Chaudhary. He appeared in television commercials and television productions including Ssshhh... Phir Koi Hai and Aapki Antara.

== Early life ==
Bakhirta is from Shimla, Himachal Pradesh.

== Career ==
Before his film debut, Bakhirta worked in advertising and appeared in more than 30 commercials after auditioning for numerous roles.

He next appeared in the romantic film Ishk Actually (2013), directed by Anish Khanna, in which he played Kabir.

He appeared in the mystery thriller 706 (film) (2019), directed by Shravan Tiwari. Bakhirta played Rahul Bora in the film.

In a 2023 interview with The Times of India, Bakhirta reflected on his debut in Pyaar Ka Punchnama, noted that playing Kabir in Ishk Actually (2013) was challenging and discussed the growth of Over-the-top media service|OTT in Indian entertainment.

He also appeared in the short film Guzara (2019) and the music video Hoon Main Alag (2024).

In 2025, Bakhirta appeared in the musical theatre production Kaneez, which premiered at the Jamshed Bhabha Auditorium-NCPA in Mumbai. He played a young priest in the production.

== Filmography ==
=== Film ===
Year	Title	Role	Notes	Ref.
2011	Pyaar Ka Punchnama	Vikrant Chaudhary		
2013	Ishk Actually	Kabir		
2019	706	Rahul Bora		

=== Television ===
Year	Title	Role	Network	Ref.
2006	Ssshhhh... Phir Koi Hai	Rahul	StarOne	
2009	Aapki Antara	Billu	ZeeTV	
2017	Savdhaan India	Arjun, Cricket Captain	LifeOk	

=== Music videos ===
Year	Title	Singer	Label	Ref.
2020	Bas Kuch Dino Ki Baat Hai	Various Artist		
2024	Hoon Main Alag	Shahid Mallya and Trishita Maitra	Zee Music	

=== Short films ===
Year	Title	Role	Ref.
2019	Guzara	Raw Agent	
2023	Eek Aayina	Hero	

=== Theatre ===
Year	Title	Role	Ref.
2025	Kaneez	Young Priest	

=== Micro drama ===
Year	Title	Role	Ref.
2026	Mera P.A. Don	Don	
