= Life Sahi Hai =

Indian web series

- Genre: Comedy
- Created by: Tarun Jain
- Starring: Siddhant Chaturvedi; Suhail Nayyar; Tarun Jain; Abhishek Saha
- Music by: Saurabh-Vaibhav
- Country of origin: India
- Original languages: Hindi; English
- No. of seasons: 2
- No. of episodes: 10

Production
- Producers: Luv Ranjan; Ankur Garg
- Production location: Delhi
- Camera setup: Multi-camera
- Running time: 16 minutes
- Production company: Luv Films

Original release
- Network: YouTube (season 1); Zee5 (season 2)
- Release: 8 June 2016 – 5 April 2018

Life Sahi Hai (transl. Life is right) is an Indian coming-of-age comedy series created by Tarun Jain. It is produced by Luv Ranjan and Ankur Garg under their production company, Luv Films. Several team members involved in the series had previously worked on the Pyaar Ka Punchnama franchise.

The first season of the show was released on YouTube in June 2016, and the second season premiered on ZEE5 in April 2018.

== Plot summary ==
Life Sahi Hai is a sitcom revolving around four men, who have moved to Delhi with the intention to live independently for the first time, and the trouble they encounter in pursuing this goal. Throughout the series, the main characters retain positive attitudes toward their situation, as exemplified by the statement 'Life Sahi Hai'.

== Cast ==
- Siddhant Chaturvedi as Sahil Hooda
- Abhishek Saha as Siddharth Srivastava
- Suhail Nayyar as Jasjit Singh
- Tarun Jain as Amit Jain
- Brijendra Kala as Sinha
- Gunjan Malhotra as Shruti Aggarwal
- Mona Ambegaonkar as Jasjit's mother
- Meenakshi Sethi as Amit's mother
- Karishma Sharma as The Maid
- Rajesh Sharma as Maid agency owner
- Saloni Batra as Neha
- Poorti Arya as The Maid
- Rumana Molla as Divya

== Episodes ==
=== Season 1 ===
No. overall	No. in season	Title	Directed by	Written by	Original release date
1	1	"The Maid"	The Lazy Three	Tarun Jain	8 June 2016
2	2	"The Boss"	Amit Kaur	Tarun Jain	16 June 2016
3	3	"The Valentine's Day"	The Lazy Three	Tarun Jain	29 June 2016
4	4	"The Party"	The Lazy Three	Tarun Jain	28 July 2016
5	5	"The Women"	The Lazy Three	Tarun Jain	23 August 2016

=== Season 2 ===
No. overall	No. in season	Title	Directed by	Written by	Original release date
1	1	"The Roommate"	Umesh Ghadge	Tarun Jain	5 April 2018
2	2	"The Rival"	Umesh Ghadge	Tarun Jain	5 April 2018
3	3	"The Cricket Match"	Umesh Ghadge	Tarun Jain	5 April 2018
4	4	"The Start Up"	Umesh Ghadge	Tarun Jain	5 April 2018
5	5	"The Performance"	Umesh Ghadge	Tarun Jain	5 April 2018
