= Kartik Aaryan =

Indian actor (born 1990)

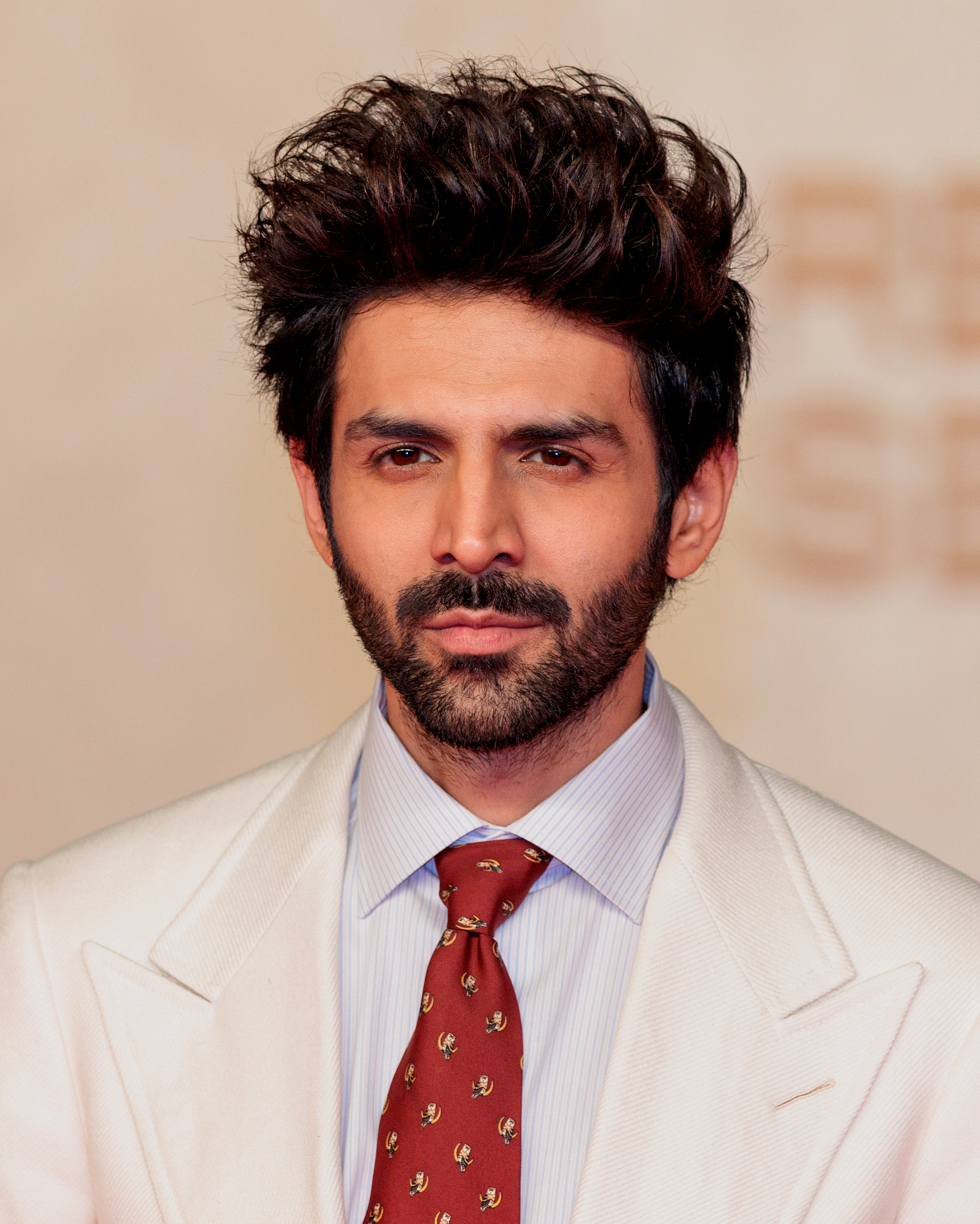
- Aaryan in 2025
- Born: Kartik Tiwari; 22 November 1990 (age 36); Gwalior, Madhya Pradesh, India
- Education: DY Patil University (BTech)
- Occupation: Actor
- Years active: 2011–present
- Awards: Full list

Kartik Aaryan (born Kartik Tiwari; 22 November 1990) is an Indian actor who primarily works in Hindi cinema. He appeared in Forbes India's Celebrity 100 list in 2019, and his accolades include a National Film Award and a Filmfare Award.

While pursuing a degree in engineering, he made his acting debut with Luv Ranjan's buddy film Pyaar Ka Punchnama (2011). He went on to star in the romances Akaash Vani (2013) and Kaanchi (2014), but these failed to propel his career forward. Aaryan had commercial successes in Ranjan's comedies Pyaar Ka Punchnama 2 (2015) and Sonu Ke Titu Ki Sweety (2018), his breakthrough film, as well as the romantic comedies Luka Chuppi and Pati Patni Aur Woh (both 2019). He also played against type in the thrillers Dhamaka (2021) and Freddy (2022), and the romantic drama Satyaprem Ki Katha (2023).

Aaryan gained praise and won a National Film Award portraying Murlikant Petkar in the biopic Chandu Champion (2024) also received the Filmfare Award for Best Actor. His highest-grossing releases came with the horror comedy films Bhool Bhulaiyaa 2 (2022) and Bhool Bhulaiyaa 3 (2024). In addition, to his acting career, Aaryan is a prominent endorser for several brands and products, and has co-hosted award ceremonies.

== Early life and work ==
Kartik Aaryan was born on 22 November 1990 as Kartik Tiwari in Gwalior, Madhya Pradesh. Both of his parents are doctors; his father, Manish Tiwari, is a paediatrician, while his mother, Mala Tiwari, is a gynaecologist.

Aaryan studied at St. Paul's School, Gwalior. He subsequently pursued his degree in Biotechnology Engineering at D.Y. Patil University in Mumbai while secretly harbouring ambitions of becoming a movie actor. He has said that he would skip classes and travel for two hours to attend auditions.

While at university, he began a modelling career. After three years of unsuccessful auditions for film roles, he enrolled in an acting course at Kreating Charakters Institute. He informed his parents of his decision to pursue acting only after signing his first film. At his mother's insistence, he eventually completed his engineering degree after the release of his debut film.

== Career ==
=== Early work and struggle (2011–2017) ===
While still in his third year of college, Aaryan made his acting debut with Luv Ranjan's buddy film Pyaar Ka Punchnama (2011), co-starring Divyendu Sharma, Raayo S. Bakhirta, and Nushrat Bharucha, which revolves around the romantic tribulations faced by three young men. He found a casting call for the film on Facebook and secured the role after auditioning for six months. As he had limited financial means at that point, he lived in an apartment with 12 other aspiring actors and earned money by cooking for them. In Pyaar Ka Punchnama, his character's four-minute monologue was one of the lengthiest single shots done for a Hindi film to that point. Reviewing it for Rediff.com, Shaikh Ayaz found Aaryan's "bursting soliloquy on why women are the way they are and can never be understood [to be] riotously funny". Namrata Joshi of Outlook criticised the film for portraying each of the female characters as a "hard-hearted bitch" but was appreciative of Aaryan's monologue and the chemistry between the three men. The film emerged as a sleeper hit and he received a nomination for the Producers Guild Film Award for Best Male Debut.

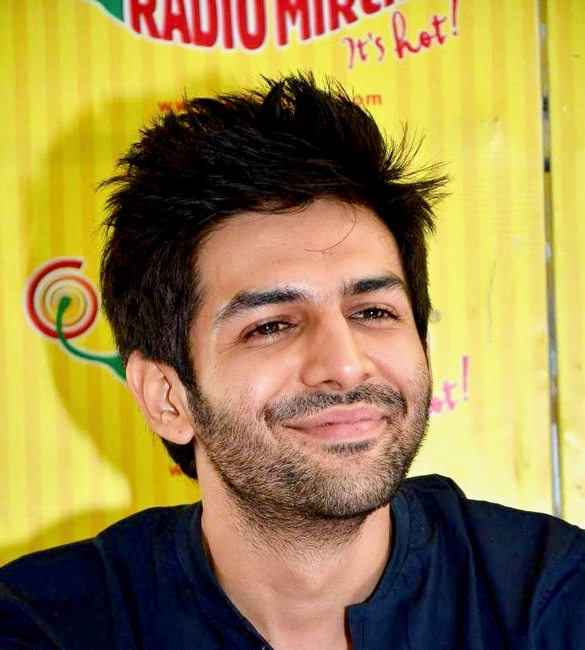
Aaryan at an event for his film Kaanchi in 2014

His next film release came two years later when he collaborated once again with Ranjan and Bharucha in the romance Akaash Vani (2013), which is about the titular lovers who are separated when Vani is married off to an abusive husband. Sudhish Kamath of The Hindu praised the film for exploring chauvinism in India, a rare concept for Hindi film, and praised the chemistry between the two stars, writing that "you can tell how much they are in love, even when they don't have any lines". Sudhir Chaudhary, the cinematographer in Aaryan's previous films, showed his work to Subhash Ghai, who was impressed by Aaryan and cast him in his directorial Kaanchi (2014). It is a drama about a woman's quest for justice when her husband is murdered by politicians, in which Aaryan played the love interest of the title character (played by Mishti). Despite a brief role, Aaryan agreed to the project to work with Ghai. Saibal Chatterjee of NDTV disliked the film but wrote that Aaryan "exudes strong screen presence and shows flashes of qualities needed to be a mainstream Bollywood lover boy". Both Akaash Vani and Kaanchi did not perform well commercially, leading Aaryan to question his career prospects.

In 2015, Aaryan starred in Ranjan's comedy sequel Pyaar Ka Punchnama 2, which retained some of the original's cast, including him and Bharucha, and added the actors Omkar Kapoor and Sunny Singh. In it, he delivered an even longer, seven minute single-shot monologue. Mike McCahill of The Guardian criticised the film's poor handling of female roles, but considered the banter between Aaryan and Bharucha's characters to be its highlight. Shubha Shetty-Guha of Mid-Day too took note of the misogynistic themes but found parts of it "uproariously funny". When asked about the sexism in the film, Aaryan said that as a proponent of gender equality his character did not reflect his personal beliefs. With earnings of over ₹880 million (US$9.4 million) against a budget of ₹220 million (US$2.4 million), Pyaar Ka Punchnama 2 emerged as a major financial success. For his performance, Aaryan won a Stardust Award for Best Actor In A Comic Role.

The following year, Aaryan featured as a young Muslim boy who falls in love with an older woman in Tanuja Chandra's short film Silvat, which was made as part of the Zeal For Unity initiative to bridge cultural barriers between India and Pakistan. As he enjoyed working in comedies, Aaryan next starred alongside Paresh Rawal and Kriti Kharbanda in Guest iin London (2017), which is about a young couple troubled by unwelcome guests. A few scenes between Rawal and him were improvised on set. In a scathing review, Rohit Vats of Hindustan Times criticised the film's reliance on flatulence humour, and wrote that Aaryan "looks good, dances well, does his gags well, but eventually ends up playing the second fiddle to Rawal. Kartik has a likeable vibe, but that gets drowned in Rawal's perennial farting". It did not perform well commercially.

=== Breakthrough (2018–2021) ===
Aaryan's breakthrough came in 2018 when he collaborated with Ranjan and Bharucha for the fourth time in Sonu Ke Titu Ki Sweety, which also reunited him with Singh. The film tells the story of Sonu (Aaryan) who plots to separate his best friend Titu (Singh) from his fiancée Sweety (Bharucha) as Sonu considers her to be a gold digger. As with the Pyaar, Ka Punchnama films, reviewers criticised the film's misogyny; Anna M. M. Vetticad of Firstpost took note of the film's homosexual undertones but panned it as a "dreary woman-hate-fest" and thought that Aaryan was "tiresome and hammy" in it. Rajeev Masand too disliked the "objectionable stereotyping" of women but found it to be "unquestionably funny" and credited Aaryan for making his character a "relatable, likeable figure despite his misdeeds". Once again addressing the criticisms, Aaryan said that portraying women as negative characters did not amount to misogyny just as casting men in villainous roles did not amount to misandry. With earnings of ₹1.5 billion (US$16 million), the film emerged as Aaryan's biggest success. He won the Zee Cine Award for Best Actor in a Comic Role.

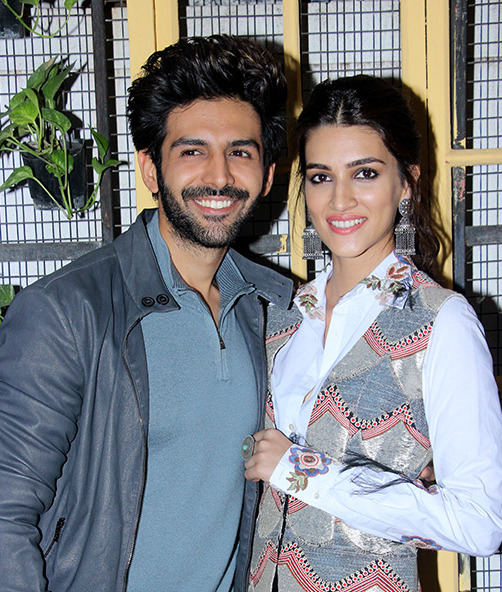
Aaryan and Kriti Sanon promoting Luka Chuppi in 2019

Aaryan believed that the success of Sonu Ke Titu Ki Sweety allowed him to choose from a wider variety of roles. He was drawn to Luka Chuppi (2019), a satire on live-in relationships in small-town India, for depicting social issues through comedy. Co-starring Kriti Sanon, it was filmed in his hometown of Gwalior. Shubhra Gupta of The Indian Express criticised the writing for failing to subvert the issues raised in the film, and thought that both Aaryan and Sanon "come off standard-issue Bollywood". He next starred alongside Bhumi Pednekar and Ananya Panday in the comedy Pati Patni Aur Woh, a remake of the 1978 film of the same name. He took on the part of a philandering husband, which was played by Sanjeev Kumar in the original film. Anupama Chopra considered the film to be less misogynistic than the original; she wrote that Aaryan "enthusiastically commits" to his part but added that he had been overshadowed by his leading ladies. Both Luka Chuppi and Pati Patni Aur Woh were commercially successful, each grossing over ₹1 billion (US$11 million) worldwide. For the latter, he won his second consecutive Zee Cine Award for Best Actor in a Comic Role.

Imtiaz Ali's romantic drama Love Aaj Kal, a spiritual successor to Ali's 2009 film of the same name was Aaryan's sole film release of 2020. He played dual roles of young men in 1990 and 2020, opposite Arushi Sharma and Sara Ali Khan, respectively, after working on the mannerisms and body language of the characters to differentiate them from each other. In a negative review of the film, Nandini Ramnath of Scroll.in wrote that Aaryan "nails the diffidence and callowness of his characters" but bemoaned that he lacked "brooding quality and simmering intensity" in certain scenes. It emerged as a box office bomb.

Aaryan was cast by Dharma Productions in the comedy sequel Dostana 2, but after filming for 20 days, he was fired. Bollywood Hungama reported that it was due to creative differences between him and producer Karan Johar. In 2021, Aaryan starred in Ram Madhvani's thriller Dhamaka, a remake of the Korean film The Terror Live (2013). Filmed entirely in 10 days, it was released on Netflix. Stutee Ghosh of The Quint believed Aaryan's dark, against-type performance to be among the film's positive aspects.

=== Bhool Bhulaiyaa and diversification (2022–present) ===
In 2022, Aaryan starred as Rooh Baba, a fraudulent psychic, in Anees Bazmee's horror comedy Bhool Bhulaiyaa 2 with Tabu and Kiara Advani. He temporarily lost his voice while filming its climax sequence. In a mixed review, Shalini Langer of The Indian Express noted that Aaryan's "cockiness [and] enthusiasm... lends some much-needed energy to the film". The film emerged as his biggest commercial success to that point, with worldwide earnings of over ₹2.67 billion (US$29 million). He won the Zee Cine Critics Award for Best Actor – Male and received a nomination for the Filmfare Award for Best Actor. He next played the titular role of a socially awkward dentist with a dark past in the psychological thriller Freddy, which released on Disney+ Hotstar. In preparation, he gained 14 kg, observed a dentist at work, and lived in isolation. Reviewers for India Today and Hindustan Times were appreciative of Aaryan for playing against his comic and romantic image.

In 2023, Aaryan starred in a remake of the Telugu action film Ala Vaikunthapurramuloo (2020), titled Shehzada. When the film's producers suffered a financial crisis, Aaryan returned his salary, and was thus credited as producer. The film was a critical and commercial failure. Reacting to its reception, Aaryan said that he would not work in a remake again. He reunited with Kiara Advani in Satyaprem Ki Katha, a romantic drama about a troubled marriage. Although Nandini Ramnath wrote that "Aaryan puts visible effort" into a complex role and Sukanya Verma believed that he "sparkles in certain moments of vulnerability", they both opined that he had been overshadowed by Advani. It emerged as a modest commercial success.

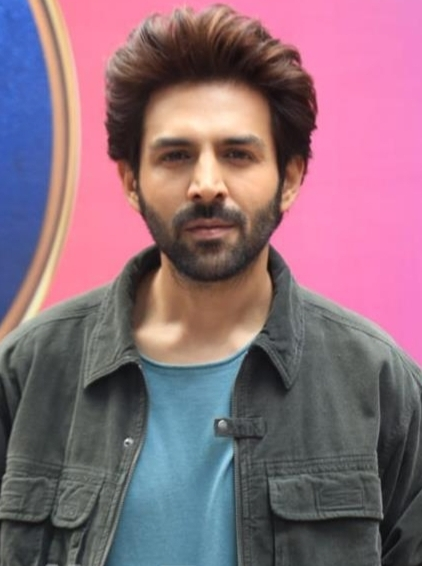
Aaryan promoting Bhool Bhulaiyaa 3 in 2024

Aaryan starred as Murlikant Petkar, an army man who became a Paralympic gold medalist, in Kabir Khan's biographical drama Chandu Champion (2024). In preparation, he underwent extensive diet and exercises, and trained in swimming and boxing. Film Companion's Rahul Desai was pleased with his physical transformation and found his performance to be "nearly bereft of vanity". It did not perform well commercially but earned Aaryan his first Filmfare Award for Best Actor as well as the National Film Award for Best Actor (shared with Mammootty for Bramayugam). He reprised his role as Rooh Baba in the spiritual sequel Bhool Bhulaiyaa 3. In a mixed review for The Hindu, Anuj Kumar lauded him as the "lifeline of the franchise" and appreciated his "natural flair for family comedy". Bhool Bhulaiyaa 3 grossed ₹4.17 billion (US$45 million) worldwide to rank as the second highest-grossing Hindi film of 2024 and Aaryan's highest-grossing release. His performance earned him the IIFA Award for Best Actor.

The following year, Aaryan reunited with Panday and Vidwans in the Dharma Productions romantic comedy Tu Meri Main Tera Main Tera Tu Meri (2025), about a couple whose relationship is strained by their respective living situations. Anuj Kumar opined that Aaryan's character was largely a variation of roles he had previously portrayed in his collaborations with Ranjan, but noted that the actor had "clearly outgrown this silly-to-sincere journey". WION's Shomini Sen dubbed this pattern of mocking women's agency before repositioning a male character as a self-sacrificing enabler the "Kartik Aaryan brand of feminism", which she noted to become a problematic theme in his filmography. The film emerged as a box-office bomb. Aaryan will next star in an as-yet untitled romantic drama film directed by Anurag Basu and co-starring Sreeleela.

== Personal life ==
Despite media speculation, Aaryan is reluctant to speak about his romantic relationships in the media. He has said, "I've never spoken about my relationships, and I expect the same from my partner". He is an eggetarian.

== Other work and media image ==
Aaryan at the 72nd National Film Awards

In addition to acting in films, Aaryan endorses several brands and products, including the sportswear brand Hummel International, the cream Emami Fair And Handsome and the clothing brand Manyavar. He has also co-hosted the 2018 IIFA Awards with Ayushmann Khurrana, and the 2019 Zee Cine Awards with Vicky Kaushal.

In 2016, Aaryan became a member of the All Stars Football Club, which organises football matches for charity. He participated with several other celebrities, including Ranbir Kapoor, for a tournament held in New Delhi the following year. Aaryan was scheduled to take part in the club's next tournament, held in Singapore in 2018, but had to back out after dislocating his toe during practice. In 2018, Aaryan raised awareness on plastic pollution during World Environment Day. The following year, the Election Commission of India appointed him to raise awareness on voter participation in his home state of Madhya Pradesh. During the COVID-19 pandemic in March 2020, Kartik Aaryan donated ₹1 crore to the PM CARES Fund to support India's relief efforts against the coronavirus outbreak. In 2026, Kartik Aaryan donated ₹1 crore to the Assam Chief Minister's Relief Fund to support relief and rehabilitation efforts during the Assam floods. In August 2026 Kartik Aaryan was invited by President Droupadi Murmu to the At Home reception at Rashtrapati Bhavan on Independence Day Aaryan is one of the highest paid actors in India. He was placed eighth in The Times of India's listing of the country's most desirable men of 2018. He held the 12th spot in the next two years. In 2019, he appeared in Forbes India's Celebrity 100 list, ranking 67th with an estimated annual income of ₹103.8 million (US$1.1 million). In 2020, Eastern Eye featured him in their listing of the dynamic dozen for the decade. In 2021, he ranked 20th in Duff & Phelps's listing of the country's most valuable celebrity brands. In 2022, he was ranked 15th in GQ India's "30 most influential young Indians" list.

== Filmography ==
=== Films ===
Key
†	Denotes films that have not yet been released

Year	Title	Role	Notes	Ref.
2011	Pyaar Ka Punchnama	Rajat "Rajjo" Mridul		
2013	Akaash Vani	Akaash Kapoor		
2014	Kaanchi: The Unbreakable	Binda Singh		
2015	Pyaar Ka Punchnama 2	Anshul "Gogo" Sharma		
2016	Silvat	Anwar Khan	Short film	
2017	Guest iin London	Aryan Shergill		
2018	Sonu Ke Titu Ki Sweety	Sonu Sharma		
2019	Luka Chuppi	Vinod "Guddu" Shukla		
2019	Pati Patni Aur Woh	Abhinav "Chintu" Tyagi		
2020	Love Aaj Kal	Veer Taneja / Raghuvendra "Raghu" Singh (Note: Aaryan played dual roles in the film; Raghu's elder version, revealed to be Raj, is portrayed by Randeep Hooda.)		
2021	Dhamaka	Arjun Pathak		
2022	Bhool Bhulaiyaa 2	Ruhan "Rooh Baba" Randhawa		
2022	Freddy	Dr. Freddy Ginwala		
2023	Shehzada	Bantu	Also producer	
2023	Tu Jhoothi Main Makkaar	Rahul	Cameo appearance	
2023	Satyaprem Ki Katha	Satyaprem "Sattu" Narayan		
2024	Chandu Champion	Murlikant Petkar		
2024	Bhool Bhulaiyaa 3	Ruhan "Rooh Baba" Randhawa / Debendranath (Note: Aaryan played dual roles in the film.)		
2025	Tu Meri Main Tera Main Tera Tu Meri	Rehaan "Ray" Mehra		
2027	Naagzilla †	Preyamvadeshwar Pyare Chand	Post-production	
2027	Untitled Anurag Basu film †	TBA	Post-production	
2027	Captain India †	TBA	Filming	
2027	Ladaku †	TBA	Filming	
2028	Kaaliya †	TBA	Pre-Production	

=== Television series ===
Year	Title	Role	Notes	Ref.
2018	19th IIFA Awards	Co-host		
2019	2019 Zee Cine Awards	Co-host		
2022	Masaba Masaba	Dr. K	Cameo	
2025	25th IIFA Awards	Co-host		

=== Music videos ===
Year	Title	Role	Singer	Ref.
2020	"Muskurayega India"	Himself	Vishal Mishra	
2020	"Nachunga Aise"	Arya	Millind Gaba	

== Awards and nominations ==
Aaryan holds the National Film Award for Best Actor and Filmfare Award for Best Actor for Chandu Champion He has received a Filmfare nomination in the Best Actor category for Bhool Bhulaiyaa 2 and two IIFA nominations in the Best Actor category for both his Bhool Bhulaiyaa franchise films, of which he won for Bhool Bhulaiyaa 3.
