= Tarun Jain =

Indian writer, actor and entrepreneur (born 1985)

- Born: 18 May 1985 (age 41); New Delhi, India
- Education: University of Southern California
- Occupations: Actor, writer, entrepreneur, founder of iforindia
- Known for: Life Sahi Hai, Pyaar Ka Punchnama 2, iForIndia, De De Pyaar De

Tarun Jain (born 18 May 1985) is an Indian writer, actor and entrepreneur. He is best known for writing Pyaar Ka Punchnama 2, De De Pyaar De, De De Pyaar De 2, as well as for creating, writing and acting in the Digital Sitcom Life Sahi Hai. He is also the founder of iForIndia.org, a social non-profit organisation created to push to greater self-governance and political accountability.

== Early life ==
Tarun was born in New Delhi, where he completed his schooling at St. Columbia’s School. He did his BS and MS in Electrical Engineering from the University Of Southern California. Before moving back to India to pursue writing and filmmaking, he worked at a startup in California and at Capital One Financial in Virginia.

== Career ==
While in Los Angeles, Jain took courses in writing, acting, and improv comedy. He quit his PhD in Electrical Engineering from USC to briefly work in the banking sector; before moving back to India to pursue his interest in films.

Jain's first writing project was the sequel to 2011's surprise hit Pyaar Ka Punchnama. While writing Pyaar Ka Punchnama 2, he simultaneously launched iForIndia with Ankur Garg. iForIndia is a social non-profit aimed at driving accountability in Indian politics.

In 2016, Jain created, wrote and acted in the sitcom Life Sahi Hai

Jain’s project De De Pyaar De, starring Ajay Devgn, Rakul Preet Singh and Tabu released worldwide on 17 May 2019.

== Filmography ==
=== Films ===
Year	Film	Role	Notes
2015	Pyaar Ka Punchnama 2	Writer	
2019	De De Pyaar De	Writer	
2025	De De Pyaar De 2	Writer	Co-written with Luv Ranjan
2026	Cocktail 2	Writer	

=== Web series ===
Year	Title	Role	Platform	Notes
2016	Life Sahi Hai (Season 1)	Creator, writer, actor	YouTube	
2018	Life Sahi Hai (Season 2)	Creator, writer, actor	ZEE5	
