= Luv Ranjan =

Indian filmmaker (born 1982)

- Born: 29 September 1982 (age 43); Ghaziabad, Uttar Pradesh, India
- Occupations: Film director; writer; lyricist; music director; producer
- Years active: 2011–present
- Organization: Luv Films
- Spouse: Alisha Vaid (m. 2022)

Luv Ranjan (born 29 September 1982) is an Indian film and music director, writer, lyricist and producer who works in Hindi cinema and owns Luv Films. His notable films include the romantic comedies Pyaar Ka Punchnama (2011), Pyaar Ka Punchnama 2 (2015), Sonu Ke Titu Ki Sweety (2018), De De Pyaar De (2019) and Tu Jhoothi Main Makkar (2023).

== Early life ==
After finishing his schooling from St. Paul's Academy, Ghaziabad, he studied at the Hindu College, Delhi University. He married his longtime girlfriend Alisha Vaid in a private ceremony in February 2022.

== Career ==
=== Directing ===
He began his career as a director in 2011 with the film, Pyaar Ka Punchnama produced by Abhishek Pathak, Panorama Studios and Viacom18 Motion Pictures. The film is a romantic comedy which depicts the life of three young bachelors. In 2013, he wrote and directed Akaash Vani. Two years later, in 2015, he co-wrote and directed the sequel of Pyaar Ka Punchnama, Pyaar Ka Punchnama 2. The sequel too received much appreciation and performed well at the box office. He directed the film Sonu Ke Titu Ki Sweety in 2018. The film performed exceedingly well at the box office, although it holds a 40% rating on Rotten Tomatoes, based on 10 reviews. All four of his directorial ventures starred Kartik Aaryan and Nushrat Bharucha in lead roles.

In December 2019, it was announced that Ranjan will direct a romantic-comedy, titled Tu Jhoothi Main Makkaar starring Ranbir Kapoor and Shraddha Kapoor in the lead roles. It went on floors in January 2021 and was released on 8 March 2023, coinciding with Holi.

=== Producing ===
He turned to production in 2012 with his childhood friend and co-producer, Ankur Garg, and founded their company, Luv Films. In 2016, he produced Life Sahi Hai, an Indian coming-of-age comedy web-series created by Tarun Jain. He directed and co-produced the comedy film, Sonu Ke Titu Ki Sweety, along with Ankur Garg and in collaboration with T-Series. It starred Kartik Aaryan, Nushrat Bharucha, and Sunny Singh in the lead roles. It emerged as a major commercial success and ranked as one of the highest-grossing Bollywood films of 2018. He next produced the urban romcom, De De Pyaar De, starring Ajay Devgn, Tabu, and Rakul Preet Singh. It was directed by his longtime editor, Akiv Ali.

== Filmography ==
Year	Title	Director	Producer	Writer	Notes
2011	Pyaar Ka Punchnama	Yes	No	Yes	Also lyricist of all songs and composer of one song
2013	Akaash Vani	Yes	No	Yes	Also lyricist of all songs
2015	Pyaar Ka Punchnama 2	Yes	No	Yes	Also lyricist of one song
2016	Life Sahi Hai	No	Yes	No	Web series
2018	Sonu Ke Titu Ki Sweety	Yes	Yes	Yes	
2019	De De Pyaar De	No	Yes	Yes	
2020	Jai Mummy Di	No	Yes	No	
2020	Malang	No	Yes	No	
2020	Chhalaang	No	Yes	Yes	Amazon Prime Video film
2022	Vadh	No	Yes	No	
2023	Kuttey	No	Yes	No	
2023	Tu Jhoothi Main Makkaar	Yes	Yes	Yes	
2024	Wild Wild Punjab	No	Yes	Yes	Netflix film Also composer and lyricist of one song
2025	Devmanus	No	Yes	No	Marathi film
2025	Ufff Yeh Siyapaa	No	Yes	No	
2025	De De Pyaar De 2	No	Yes	Yes	Co-written with Tarun Jain; co-produced with Bhushan Kumar, Krishan Kumar, Ankur Garg
2026	Vadh 2	No	Yes	No	
2026	Cocktail 2	No	Yes	Yes	
