= Chandu Champion =

2024 Indian film by Kabir Khan

- Theatrical release poster
- Directed by: Kabir Khan
- Written by: Kabir Khan; Sumit Arora; Sudipto Sarkar
- Produced by: Sajid Nadiadwala; Kabir Khan
- Starring: Kartik Aaryan
- Narrated by: Sonali Kulkarni
- Cinematography: Sudeep Chatterjee
- Edited by: Nitin Baid
- Music by: Songs: Pritam; Score: Julius Packiam
- Production companies: Nadiadwala Grandson Entertainment; Kabir Khan Films
- Distributed by: Pen Marudhar Entertainment
- Release date: 14 June 2024
- Running time: 142 minutes
- Country: India
- Language: Hindi
- Budget: est. ₹70–80 crore
- Box office: est. ₹88.73 crore

Chandu Champion is a 2024 Indian Hindi-language biographical sports drama film written, directed and produced by Kabir Khan along with producer Sajid Nadiadwala under Nadiadwala Grandson Entertainment. The film stars Kartik Aaryan in the titular role as India's first Paralympics gold medalist, Murlikant Petkar.

Principal photography took place from July 2023 to January 2024, with filming held in London, Wai, Jammu, and Kashmir. Chandu Champion was released on 14 June 2024 to mixed-to-positive reviews, with praise for Aaryan's performance, Khan's direction and cinematography. It emerged as a commercial failure, grossing ₹88.73 crore worldwide. At the 70th Filmfare Awards, the film received 4 nominations, including Best Production Design and Best Lyricist, and won the award for Best Actor (Aaryan). At the 72nd National Film Awards, it won Best Actor for Aaryan (shared with Mammootty for Bramayugam).

== Plot ==
An aged Murlikant Petkar arrives at a local police station, saying he wants to file a complaint against the President of India for not being awarded the Arjuna Award for his achievements. He adds that his winning the award would help develop his village. When questioned by an officer about his eligibility, he recounts his remarkable journey:

Murlikant grew up in a small village called Peth Islampur in Maharashtra. At a young age, he develops the ambition to win an Olympic gold medal for India, for which he is mocked and made fun of by his classmates and also scolded by his father.

Events lead him to run away from home and join the Indian Army Corps of EME, where he is selected and trained as a boxer. He was selected to represent India in boxing at the International Services Sports Meet 1964 in Tokyo, where he did well, but lost in the final round because he was distracted and not focused enough. Disappointed at his losing in spite of his potential, his coach Tiger Ali refuses to train him further.

Their unit is involved in the Indo-Pakistani war of 1965, in which their camp comes under air attack. He is severely injured, with a bullet injuring his spine, rendering him a paraplegic. He is admitted to an infirmary for the war wounded, where, depressed at his condition and that he can never win an Olympic Gold, he has given up on life and attempts suicide.

His former coach Tiger Ali visits him in the infirmary, and inspires him to compete in the Paralympics. He trains hard and qualifies for the 1972 Summer Paralympics in the 50m freestyle swimming event. While he is there, the Palestinian terrorist attack on the Olympics takes place, due to which the Paralympics are shifted to a different venue in Heidelberg. He successfully progresses through the multiple heats at the new venue and ultimately wins the gold medal, setting a new World record. Once news reaches his village, he becomes a celebrity and is welcomed back by the villagers with great fanfare.

However, his achievements have been forgotten over the years. The police inspector is impressed by his story but still suspicious about its authenticity. He contacts a journalist to write an article about him. Upon reading the article and receiving Petkar's application for the Arjuna Award, he is visited by a senior government official, who tells him that the Arjuna Award is too small an award for his achievements, and the government has instead decided to award him the Padma Shri.

On 20 March, he received the Padma Shri from the President of India.

There were various difficulties that faced Murlikant Petkar during his lifetime but he never gave up and kept on pursuing his objectives.

== Cast ==
- Kartik Aaryan as Murlikant Petkar alias Chandu Champion
  - Ayan Khan Sroha as young Murlikant
- Vijay Raaz as Tiger Ali, Murli's mentor
- Bhuvan Arora as Karnail Singh, Murli's friend
- Yashpal Sharma as Major Uttam Singh
- Rajpal Yadav as Topaz, hospital wardboy later Murli's friend
- Aniruddh Dave as Jagannath Rajaram Petkar, Murlikant's elder brother
  - Samyak Shringirishi as young Jagannath
- Shreyas Talpade as Inspector Sachin Kamble
- Nitin Bhajan as Murlikant's father
- Hemangi Kavi as Murlikant's mother
- Ganesh Yadav as Ganpat Bhau
- Bhagyashri Borse as Journalist Nayantara
- Sonali Kulkarni as a journalist, who writes the article about Murlikant Petkar
- Hemant Choudhary as Brigadier at Secunderabad
- Brijendra Kala as a prisoner at police station
- Jagat Rawat as Doctor
- Dilnaz Irani as Nurse
- Adonis Kapsalis as Carlos Pedroza
- Shivraj Walvekar as Minister Vishwas Patil

== Production ==
=== Development ===
Kabir Khan first announced the film in July 2022. The film was officially announced with a motion poster on 4 July 2023 by Sajid Nadiadwala, to be directed by Kabir Khan and starring Kartik Aaryan.

=== Casting ===
Kartik Aaryan was chosen to play the lead in his second collaboration with producer Sajid Nadiadwala after Satyaprem Ki Katha (2023). Aaryan underwent a significant physical change for the role, reducing his body fat percentage from a remarkable 39% to a slender 7% over only 14 months.

=== Filming ===
Principal photography commenced on 12 July 2023 with a Muhurta puja in London, where the first schedule was completed. The second schedule commenced on 24 September 2023 in Kashmir. The crew also filmed the movie at Wai village in Maharashtra. Filming wrapped after eight months on 31 January 2024. A challenging 8-minute single-shot war sequence was shot at Aru Valley in Jammu at 9000 feet above sea level.

== Music ==
Chandu Champion

Soundtrack album by Pritam
- Released: 15 June 2024
- Recorded: 2023–24
- Genre: Feature film soundtrack
- Length: 30:45
- Label: T-Series

Pritam chronology
Merry Christmas (2024)	Chandu Champion (2024)	Metro... In Dino (2025)

Official audio
- Chandu Champion - Audio Jukebox on YouTube

Singles from Chandu Champion
- 1. "Satyanaas" Released: 24 May 2024; 2. "Tu Hai Champion" Released: 30 May 2024; 3. "Sarphira" Released: 8 June 2024

The music for the film is composed by Pritam, while the lyrics are written by Amitabh Bhattacharya, IP Singh and Kausar Munir. The first single titled "Satyanaas" was released on 24 May 2024. The second single, "Tu Hai Champion," was released on 30 May 2024. The third single titled "Sarphira" was released on 8 June 2024.

Track listing
No.	Title	Lyrics	Singer(s)	Length
1.	"Satyanaas"	Amitabh Bhattacharya	Arijit Singh, Nakash Aziz, Dev Negi	3:25
2.	"Tu Hai Champion"	IP Singh	Arijit Singh, Amit Mishra	3:36
3.	"Sarphira"	Kausar Munir	Sreerama Chandra	3:25
4.	"Jamoore"	Amitabh Bhattacharya	Mame Khan, Kailash Waghmare	3:53
5.	"Na Door Hai Na Paas Hai"	Kausar Munir	Darshan Raval	4:07
6.	"Jeet Ka Geet"	Kausar Munir	Shaan	4:20
7.	"Sarphira" (Climax Version)	Kausar Munir	Mohammed Irfan	7:58
Total length:				30:45

== Marketing ==
The film's trailer was released on 8 May 2024 at Captain Roop Singh Stadium in Aaryan's hometown, Gwalior. Aaryan promoted the film at the dance reality show Dance Deewane. A special film screening was held for the Indian Army officers on 5 June 2024 in Delhi, where Petkar was felicitated.

== Release ==
=== Theatrical ===
The film was theatrically released on 14 June 2024.

=== Home media ===
The film premiered on Amazon Prime Video on 9 August 2024.

== Reception ==
=== Critical reception ===
Chandu Champion received mixed-to-positive reviews from critics, with praise for Aaryan's performance, Khan's direction and cinematography. On the review aggregator website Rotten Tomatoes, 87% of 15 critics' reviews are positive, with an average rating of 5.9/10.

A critic for Bollywood Hungama rated the film 4 stars out of 5 and wrote, "Chandu Champion rests on Kartik Aaryan's powerful performance and some strong moments." Nishad Thaivalappil of News18 rated the film 4 stars out of 5 and wrote, "Overall, Chandu Champion, skillfully directed by Kabir Khan, proves irresistible with its powerful feel-good story."

Vinamra Mathur of Firstpost rated the film 3.5 stars out of 5 and wrote "Kartik Aaryan delivers an earnest performance in Murlikant Petkar's inspiring story." Arushi Jain of India Today rated the film 3 stars out of 5 and wrote, "What makes the Kartik Aaryan-led film worth a watch is the way that Kabir Khan truly believes in his story and turns it into a feel-good experience."

Sukanya Verma of Rediff rated 2.5/5 stars and notes, "Chandu Champion is Kartik Aaryan's most ambitious work so far, and the actor's muscular gusto is undeniable. There's visible fire in the man's belly, but not enough soul." Shubhra Gupta of The Indian Express rated the film 2.5 stars out of 5 and wrote, "Kartik Aaryan makes you root for his character even though Kabir Khan's film falls into declarative, underlined patches."

=== Box office ===
As of 11 July 2024, Chandu Champion has grossed ₹74.35 crore in India and ₹13.79 crore overseas for a worldwide total of ₹88.14 crore.

== Accolades ==
Chandu Champion – Awards and nominations
Award	Category	Recipients	Result
Indian Film Festival of Melbourne	Best Film	Sajid Nadiadwala – NGE; Kabir Khan – Kabir Khan Films	Nominated
Indian Film Festival of Melbourne	Best Actor	Kartik Aaryan	Won
Indian Film Festival of Melbourne	Best Director	Kabir Khan	Won
Zee Cine Awards	Best Actor – Male	Kartik Aaryan	Won
Indie Film Festival Awards	Best Film	Sajid Nadiadwala – NGE; Kabir Khan – Kabir Khan Films	Won
Indie Film Festival Awards	Best Actor	Kartik Aaryan	Won
Indie Film Festival Awards	Best Director	Kabir Khan	Nominated
Iconic Gold Awards	Best Film	Sajid Nadiadwala – NGE; Kabir Khan – Kabir Khan Films	Won
Iconic Gold Awards	Best Actor	Kartik Aaryan	Won
Iconic Gold Awards	Best Director	Kabir Khan	Won
News18 Showsha Reel Awards	Best Film	Sajid Nadiadwala – NGE; Kabir Khan – Kabir Khan Films	Nominated
News18 Showsha Reel Awards	Best Actor	Kartik Aaryan	Nominated
News18 Showsha Reel Awards	Best Director	Kabir Khan	Won
FOI Online Awards	Best Cinematography	Sudeep Chatterjee	Nominated
FOI Online Awards	Best Choreography	Bosco–Caesar	Nominated
Ahmedabad International Film Festival	Festival Mention	Kartik Aaryan; Kabir Khan	Won
Filmfare Awards	Best Actor	Kartik Aaryan	Won
Filmfare Awards	Best Lyrics	Kausar Munir	Nominated
Filmfare Awards	Best Costume Design	Rohit Chaturvedi	Nominated
Filmfare Awards	Best Production Design	Rajnish Hednao	Nominated
National Film Awards	National Film Award for Best Actor in a Leading Role	Kartik Aaryan	Won
