= Tu Jhoothi Main Makkaar =

2023 Indian film by Luv Ranjan

- Theatrical release poster
- Directed by: Luv Ranjan
- Written by: Luv Ranjan
- Story by: Luv Ranjan
- Produced by: Luv Ranjan
- Starring: Ranbir Kapoor; Shraddha Kapoor; Dimple Kapadia
- Cinematography: Santhana Krishnan Ravichandran
- Edited by: Akiv Ali; Chetan M. Solanki
- Music by: Songs: Pritam; Score: Hitesh Sonik
- Production companies: Luv Films; T-Series Films
- Distributed by: Yash Raj Films
- Release date: 8 March 2023
- Running time: 164 minutes
- Country: India
- Language: Hindi
- Budget: ₹200 crore
- Box office: ₹220.10 crore

Tu Jhoothi Main Makkaar (transl. You're a liar, I'm a con), abbreviated as TJMM, is a 2023 Indian Hindi-language romantic comedy film directed by Luv Ranjan, and produced by Luv Films and T-Series Films. The film stars Ranbir Kapoor and Shraddha Kapoor in the lead roles, alongside Dimple Kapadia, Boney Kapoor and Anubhav Singh Bassi in supporting roles. It marks the return of Shraddha Kapoor after a three-year hiatus, and the acting debuts of Boney Kapoor and Bassi. Kartik Aaryan and Nushrratt Bharuccha appear in cameos.

The film was announced in December 2019. Initially scheduled to begin production in 2020, the filming was delayed due to the COVID-19 pandemic. Principal photography began in January 2021 and wrapped up in August 2022. The film was shot in Mumbai and Spain for 180 days. The soundtrack album was composed by Pritam, with lyrics by Amitabh Bhattacharya and background score by Hitesh Sonik, while the cinematography and editing were handled by Santhana Krishnan Ravichandran and Akiv Ali.

Tu Jhoothi Main Makkaar was released in cinemas on 8 March 2023, coinciding with Holi. The film received mixed-to-positive reviews from critics and grossed ₹220.10 crore (US$24 million) worldwide against the budget of between ₹165 crore (equivalent to ₹180 crore or US$19 million in 2026) and over ₹200 crore (equivalent to ₹218 crore or US$23 million in 2026); it is the tenth highest-grossing Hindi film of 2023. At the 69th Filmfare Awards, Pritam was nominated for Best Music Director for the film's soundtrack.

== Plot ==
Rohan "Mickey" Arora is the son of Ramesh Arora, a rich Punjabi business magnate, and lives with his family in New Delhi. Mickey and his best friend Manu Dabbas secretly work as break-up consultants, helping people break-up with their respective partners. Mickey and Manu travel to Spain for Manu's bachelor party, where they are accompanied by Manu's fiancée Kinchi and her best friend Nisha "Tinni" Malhotra. Mickey and Tinni hook up and eventually fall in love.

Upon returning, Mickey introduces Tinni to his family. At Manu and Kinchi’s wedding, Tinni’s family learns that Tinni is in a relationship with Mickey through Mickey’s mother. The families accept their relationship and start preparations for their wedding. However, Tinni feels she is not ready for the marriage and decides to break-up with Mickey. Tinni contacts the break-up consultant on phone, not knowing that it is Mickey, and asks for help in breaking up with him. Unaware that he is speaking with Tinni, Mickey agrees to help her.

Mickey suggests that Tinni and her partner match each other's horoscopes and if they do not align, then the marriage can be called off. However, their horoscopes align perfectly. Mickey soon finds out that the client is none other than Tinni and gets heartbroken as she did not discuss her concerns with him and try to sort out the misunderstandings. Mickey decides to play along and beat Tinni at her own game. Mickey suggests Tinni to do a "jealousy test", which can lead to their break-up.

Tinni hires a guy to act as her old friend and dances seductively with him in front of Mickey, but Mickey remains unaffected. Mickey suggests to do a "loyalty test" and Tinni hires a girl to seduce Mickey and if he cheats on her, then she could easily break-up with him, but Mickey does not give in and acts as a loyal partner. Mickey, posing as the break-up consultant on phone, asks Tinni about the reason for breaking up with him. Tinni reveals that she does not want to live with his family after the marriage and wants to live independently so that they can have their own personal space. Knowing that Mickey loves his family dearly and not wanting to make him choose between her and his family, she wants to break-up with him.

Mickey does not want to leave his family for her and decides to go ahead with breaking off the marriage. Mickey suggests to Tinni to say that she has received a job offer in Bengaluru and that she would permanently move there after the marriage. Going by the plan, Tinni tells this to Mickey on their engagement day and he angrily lashes out at her, saying that she should have discussed it with him beforehand as this is not acceptable to him. Their engagement is called off and they part ways.

Sometime later, Mickey and Tinni meet again at Kinchi's baby shower. Tinni's foot is injured while dancing at the function and Mickey, along with his family, take care for her, which makes Tinni realise the value of living together as a family. Mickey's niece Chhoti, while talking to Tinni, blurts out a unique phrase that she heard from Mickey that causes Tinni to realise that the break-up consultant was Mickey.

Tinni confronts Mickey about it and says that she is disappointed as even after knowing the truth, Mickey did not try to sort out the matter with her and that she still loves him. Tinni says that she would be permanently leaving for London and heads to the airport. Mickey's family advises him not to leave her by compromising his love for them. Along with his whole family, Mickey rushes to the airport to stop Tinni and reach her just as she is about to board the flight. Mickey and Tinni propose to each other, where they get married and live happily together as a family.

== Cast ==
- Ranbir Kapoor as Rohan "Mickey" Arora
- Shraddha Kapoor as Nisha "Tinni" Malhotra
- Dimple Kapadia as Renu Arora, Mickey's mother
- Anubhav Singh Bassi as Manu Dabas, Mickey's best friend
- Boney Kapoor as Ramesh Arora, Mickey's father
- Hasleen Kaur as Minny, Mickey's sister
- Amber Rana as Ashish, Mickey's brother-in-law
- Monica Chaudhary as Kinchi Dabas, Manu's wife
- Inayat Verma as Sweetu, Mickey's niece
- Jatinder Kaur as Mrs. Arora, Mickey's grandmother
- Rajesh Jais as Mr. Malhotra, Tinni's father
- Ayesha Raza Mishra as Mrs. Malhotra, Tinni's mother
- Dhruv Tyagi as Kunal Varma
- Teena Singh as Jyoti Sharma
- Kartik Aaryan as Rahul (cameo appearance)
- Nushrratt Bharuccha as Anya (cameo appearance)

== Production ==
=== Development ===
In 2018, it was announced that Luv Ranjan would be directing a new action film starring Ajay Devgn and Ranbir Kapoor in lead roles. However, the project was later shelved owing to a lack of dates from Devgn. Ranjan then narrated the story of Tu Jhoothi Main Makkaar to Kapoor.

The film was officially announced as an untitled romantic comedy on 20 December 2019. The first release date of the film was set to be on 26 March 2021. Due to the COVID-19 pandemic, the release date was shifted to 18 March 2022. Yet again, due to the delay in filming, the release date was shifted to 26 January 2023, thus coinciding with the Indian Republic Day. The final release date was then decided to be 8 March 2023, concurring with the festival of Holi.

=== Casting ===
Ranbir Kapoor and Shraddha Kapoor were cast as the leads, marking their first project together. Dimple Kapadia and producer Boney Kapoor (in his acting debut) were cast as Ranbir's parents. It also marked the acting debut of stand-up comedian Anubhav Singh Bassi and the Hindi film debut of actress Monica Chaudhary. Hasleen Kaur confirmed her presence in the film in January 2023.

=== Filming ===
Filming began on 8 January 2021 in Ghaziabad with Ranbir and Shraddha. In July 2021, the second schedule of the film commenced in Delhi. The third schedule began in August 2021 in Mumbai, followed by another schedule in November 2021 in Delhi. The next schedule again took place in Mumbai in March 2022. The next schedule took place in Spain and Mauritius in June 2022.

In July 2022, a song featuring Shraddha Kapoor and Ranbir Kapoor was to be shot, but production was stalled when a fire broke out at the film's set in Chitrakoot Grounds, Andheri. It led to the death of a crew member named Manish Devashi, while another man from the lighting department was injured. The song was shot after a few days. The film was wrapped up in August 2022.

== Marketing ==
Tu Jhoothi Main Makkaar's title was released with an announcement video along with the first poster on 14 December 2022. The official trailer was released on 23 January 2023 in an event held in Mumbai. Following the theme of the film, the two leads did not promote the film together. The film had a special screening on 7 March 2023, a day before release.

== Soundtrack ==
The music of the film is composed by Pritam with lyrics written by Amitabh Bhattacharya. The album features six songs: "Tere Pyaar Mein", "Pyaar Hota Kayi Baar Hai", "Show Me The Thumka", "O Bedardeya", Maine Pi Rakhi Hai" and "Jaadui". It was released by T-Series on 11 March 2023. White Noise collectives was nominated for the Filmfare Award for Best Music Director for the soundtrack.

== Release ==
=== Theatrical ===
The film was released on 8 March 2023, coinciding with the Holi festival.

=== Home media ===
The film premiered on Netflix on 3 May 2023.

== Reception ==
=== Critical response ===
Tu Jhoothi Main Makkaar received mixed-to-positive reviews from critics and audiences. On the review aggregator website Rotten Tomatoes, 33% of 15 critics' reviews are positive, with an average rating of 5.3/10.

Monika Rawal Kukreja of Hindustan Times wrote "Tu Jhoothi Main Makkaar is your age-old love story packaged in a modern day setup. It is weird and problematic, but rendered in a funny manner which might hook you in. You may struggle to sit through the pre-interval, but things settle a bit after that. Definitely a one-time watch for entertaining performances and monologues". Sukanya Verma of Rediff rated the film 2.5 out of 5 stars and wrote "Tu Jhoothi Main Makkaar rejoices in this dated deceit and stays true to its director's trademark boy bias." Pratikshya Mishra of The Quint rated the film 2 out of 5 stars and wrote "Tu Jhoothi Main Makkaar doesn’t try to be more than it is advertised to be and at first sight; it can even be considered entertaining. However, once you start to peel apart the layers, its flaws are laid bare and one wonders if Bollywood will ever grow out of those tropes".

Shubhra Gupta from The Indian Express was critical towards the filming, giving it a 1.5 out of 5 stars rating, finding fault with the length of the film, misogynistic elements and worn-out jokes. Saibal Chatterjee also gave the film a 1.5 out of 5 star rating in a review for NDTV, calling the film "More farce than comedy, more chaos than caprice, more dalliance than romance". Tina Das of ThePrint was critical towards the film, rated 1.5 out of 5 star and wrote "Ranbir Kapoor’s Tu Jhoothi Main Makkar an endless drag with bad dialogues, misplaced songs".

Renuka Vyavahare of The Times of India gave the film a rating of 3.5 stars out of 5 and stated that the film has "humour and heart at the right place". Titas Chowdhury of News 18 rated the film 3.5 out of 5, termed the chemistry between the leads as "pappable and sizzling" and music as the "strong point of the film". Devesh Sharma of Filmfare rated the film 3.5 out of 5 stars and wrote "Watch Tu Jhoothi Main Makkaar for the fresh pairing of Ranbir and Shraddha and for its several comic moments. You laugh the most in the last 30 minutes. It’s infinitely better than his earlier products and let’s hope he continues to tread this newfound path". Tushar Joshi of India Today rated the film 3.5 out of 5 stars and wrote that the film's "latter half and peppy climax redeem its lazy first half and making it a worthy entertainer".

Ganesh Aaglave of Firstpost rated the film 3.5 out of 5 stars and wrote "Luv Ranjan ticks all the right boxes again with Tu Jhoothi Main Makkaar. The exotic locations and chartbuster music add great value to the film. Special mention to the superb climax, which will leave a huge smile on your face while exiting the cinema hall. Ranbir hits the ball out of the park his expressive eyes, which speak volumes in each and every frame. Shraddha is terrific, and the chemistry between her and RK is lit". Abhimanyu Mathur of DNA India rated the film 3 out of 5 stars and wrote "Tu Jhoothi Main Makkaar is a fun watch, but only if you have the patience to sit through a first half that is hammied and walks a long and winding route, taking its own sweet time to arrive at any point. The film’s beating heart is Ranbir Kapoor. The man returns to the romantic comedy genre and owns the screen like he never left. He is smooth in the fun scenes, impactful in the emotional ones".

=== Box office ===
Tu Jhoothi Main Makkaar grossed ₹18.73 crore (US$2.0 million) in India and ₹2.87 crore (US$310,000) overseas taking collection to ₹21.6 crore (US$2.3 million), on its opening day coinciding with Holi. In India the film took opening weekend of ₹70.24 crore nett and crossed ₹100 crore nett collection mark on the 11th day of film's release.

The film has grossed ₹177.44 crore (US$19 million) in India and ₹42.66 crore (US$4.6 million) overseas for a worldwide gross collection of ₹220.1 crore (US$24 million). It drew audiences to cinemas, but was not considered a commercial hit.
