= Pyaar Ka Punchnama 2 =

2015 film by Luv Ranjan

- Poster
- Directed by: Luv Ranjan
- Written by: Rahul Mody; Tarun Jain; Luv Ranjan
- Produced by: Abhishek Pathak
- Starring: Kartik Aaryan; Nushrat Bharucha; Sonnalli Seygall; Ishita Raj Sharma; Omkar Kapoor; Sunny Singh
- Cinematography: Sudhir K. Chaudhary
- Edited by: Akiv Ali; Ajay Sharma
- Music by: Score & Songs: Hitesh Sonik; Guest Composers: Shaarib-Toshi
- Production companies: Viacom18 Motion Pictures; Panorama Studios
- Distributed by: Panorama Studios; Anand Pandit Motion Pictures; Sri Adhikari Brothers; Luv Films; Reliance Entertainment
- Release date: 16 October 2015
- Running time: 136 minutes
- Country: India
- Language: Hindi
- Box office: est. ₹88.17 crore

Pyaar Ka Punchnama 2 (transl. Case file of love 2) is a 2015 Indian Hindi-language romantic comedy film. It is a standalone sequel to the 2011 film Pyaar Ka Punchnama. The sequel is directed by Luv Ranjan and produced by Viacom 18 Motion Pictures and Panorama Studios Production. The film stars Kartik Aaryan, Omkar Kapoor, Sunny Singh, Nushrat Bharucha, Ishita Raj Sharma and Sonnalli Seygall. The film was released on 16 October 2015.

== Plot ==
Three bachelors Anshul "Gogo" Sharma, Siddharth "Sid" Gandotra aka Chauka and Tarun Thakur are flatmates and best friends. Gogo falls in love with Ruchika "Chiku" Khanna; Chauka falls for Supriya Agarwal. Thakur begins dating Kusum Singh, and they develop an intimate relationship. Chiku, Supriya and Kusum don't like each other.

Chiku is too close to her friend Sunny since they live together and can even sleep in the same bed. Supriya does not have the guts to tell her family about Chauka and introduces him as just another common friend to them which irks him. Her dad looks for a groom for her, and even asks Chauka to help him, which complicates matters. Kusum is too cautious about money: she insists everyone, despite their relationship with another, should only spend their own money. But then starts using Thakur's money to fulfil her many needs and wants.

The three men become too tired to solve the issues in their own love stories, leading to their girlfriends willing to help solve those problems. Chiku drives Sunny out of her house; Supriya finally tells her father that she loves Siddharth and wants to marry him, but gets firmly rejected; Kusum also agrees not to care that much about money. Kusum reveals to Thakur that her pregnancy test reports are negative, but expresses herself as willing to start a family if Thakur supports her financially.

Despite the effort of the three boys and the three girls, the problems remain: after Chiku drives Sunny out of her house, Gogo accidentally hears her flatmates telling her that she should break up with Gogo and be with Sunny, as they all think she and Sunny are the real deal; Supriya runs away from home and meets Siddharth and spends the night with him. Her father arrives there the next morning with the police. He accuses Siddharth of taking Supriya away from her house against her will. Supriya, who always lacks the guts to oppose her father, supports her father's claim and testifies against Siddharth. It plays in Siddharth's favour however as he breaks up with Supriya, thereby saving his life from being ruined. Thakur resigns and starts his own website, encouraged by Kusum. However, Kusum refuses to financially support Thakur's plan even if it will benefit them both if it succeeds.

Finally, the three boys all give up their love for feeling desperate. Gogo breaks up with Chiku while saying "I love you" and he says he learns from her that those three words are the cheapest words. Siddharth breaks up with Supriya in a police station right after she testifies against him. Thakur breaks up with Kusum and tells her she should return over 850,000 rupees that he spent on her, as according to her life rules that she doesn't like taking favours from anyone.

The film ends by showing all three men single, happy and enjoying each other's company, on the phone with their mother.

== Cast ==
- Kartik Aaryan as Anshul 'Gogo' Sharma aka Anshu
- Omkar Kapoor as Tarun Thakur/Thakur
- Sunny Singh as Siddharth 'Sid' Gandotra / Chauka
- Nushrat Bharucha as Ruchika 'Chiku' Khanna
- Ishita Raj Sharma as Kusum Singh
- Sonnalli Seygall as Supriya Randhawa
- Sharat Saxena as Rakesh Randhawa, Supriya's father
- Mona Ambegaonkar as Mrs. Randhawa, Supriya's mother
- Manvir Singh as Sunny
- Rumana Molla as Ruchi
- Karishma Sharma as Tina
- Prakhar Shukla as Chiku's best friend
- Rajan as a Gift Delivery Man
- Aparshakti Khurana as a Man in Bathroom (uncredited role)

== Soundtrack ==
Pyaar Ka Punchnama 2

Soundtrack album by Hitesh Sonik and Shaarib-Toshi
- Released: 2015
- Genre: Feature film soundtrack
- Length: 15:10
- Language: Hindi
- Label: Zee Music Company

The music for Pyaar Ka Punchnama 2 has been composed by Shaarib-Toshi, Hitesh Sonik and Luv Ranjan. The music rights are acquired by Zee Music Company.

Track listing
No.	Title	Lyrics	Music	Singer(s)	Length
1.	"Sharabi"	Late Akram Sabri, Danish Sabri	Sharib-Toshi	Sharib, Toshi & Raja Hasan	04:13
2.	"Paro"	Kumaar	Hitesh Sonik	Dev Negi, Shipra Goyal	04:27
3.	"Heeriye"	Hitesh Sonik	Hitesh Sonik	Mohit Chauhan	03:35
4.	"Moorakh"	Luv Ranjan	Hitesh Sonik	Divya Kumar	02:55
Total length:					15:10

== Reception ==
Some critics enjoyed the comedy.

Rajeev Masand of CNN-IBN gave the movie 3 stars describing the movie as "The film is funnier than the prequel." He notes that "It’s in the last act that the film throws away any pretence of humor and adopts an especially spiteful tone that’s reminiscent of the earlier film. Until this point the jokes were consistently funny and the stereotyping seldom mean-spirited."

Hindustan Times praised the performance of the actors, stating "All the actors fit perfectly into their characters: The boys effortlessly depict what men often discuss during boys’ talk and the girls play dumb as and when the character demands."

The Hindu review stated "Carrying forward the flavour of the original, it is a film that many men make in their minds!"

The Economic Times review mentioned "Sure, the film may resonate with the masochistic sorts who like taking a whipping in love or even those who enjoy a few laughs no matter the joke, but the rest can easily skip this one."

Like the 2011 film's famous five minute long monologue where Kartik Aaryan's character vents about the frustrations with dating women, this movie delivered a seven minute long monologue.

== Box office ==
The film grossed ₹5.50–5.75 crore on its opening day, beating the records of Piku, Katti Batti and Jazbaa. By the end of the first weekend, a total of ₹22.40 crore (US$2.3 million) total had been collected. The film collected ₹39.25 crore (US$4.1 million) by the end of its opening week.
