= Dhamaka (2021 film) =

2021 Indian film by Ram Madhvani

- Official release poster
- Directed by: Ram Madhvani
- Written by: Puneet Sharma; Ram Madhvani
- Story by: Kim Byung-woo
- Based on: The Terror Live by Kim Byung-woo
- Produced by: Ronnie Screwvala; Amita Madhvani; Ram Madhvani
- Starring: Kartik Aaryan; Mrunal Thakur; Amruta Subhash
- Cinematography: Manu Anand
- Edited by: Monisha R. Baldawa; Amit Karia
- Music by: Vishal Khurana K
- Production companies: RSVP Movies; Ram Madhvani Films; Lotte Cultureworks; Global Gate Entertainment; Lionsgate
- Distributed by: Netflix
- Release date: November 19, 2021
- Running time: 104 minutes
- Country: India
- Language: Hindi

Dhamaka (transl. Blast) is a 2021 Indian Hindi-language thriller film written and directed by Ram Madhvani. An official remake of the 2013 film The Terror Live, the film stars Kartik Aaryan as a journalist who receives a threat after exclusively interviewing a terrorist, who threatens to blow up the Bandra Worli Sea Link in Mumbai. Mrunal Thakur and Amruta Subhash co-star in prominent roles.

The adaptation was first pitched by Sunir Kheterpal of Azure Entertainment along with the producers of the original film. After Kheterpal dropped the project, Screwvala acquired the rights for the adaptation with Madhvani helming the project. An official announcement was made in November 2020, production began in December 2020 in Mumbai, and was completed within ten days. The post-production works began simultaneously and were completed within four months, with pending visual effects and graphics process, which were resumed after the COVID-19 lockdown due to the second wave of the pandemic, in September 2021. The cinematography is handled by Manu Anand and edited by Monisha Baldawa and Amit Karia. The music and background score is composed by Vishal Khurana K.

Originally scheduled for theatrical release, this decision was dropped by the producers in January 2021, in favour of a direct-to-digital release through the streaming service Netflix, on 19 November 2021. The film was also screened at the 52nd International Film Festival of India after the film's release. The film received mixed reviews from critics, while praising Aaryan's performance and Madhvani's direction, they pointed out the cliched plot and dialogues.

== Plot ==
Arjun Pathak was once a top news anchor, but gets demoted due to his behavior. Pulled from primetime TV news and recently divorced, he is now the jaded and bitter host of a current affairs radio program. One day during his morning show, Arjun receives a peculiar phone call threatening to blow up the Bandra-Worli Sea Link, a major bridge visible from Arjun's studio building. He takes it as a prank call but watches in shock as the caller follows through and detonates explosives that cause the bridge to collapse, killing innocent people and trapping others.

Realising this could be a once-in-a-lifetime opportunity to make his comeback as a newscaster, Arjun doesn't call the police. Instead, he sets up a makeshift television studio from his radio station, and negotiates with his former boss, the ratings-obsessed news producer, Ankita Malaskar, to get his position back. He strikes a dangerous deal with the terrorist to exclusively broadcast their phone conversations in real-time, as the whole nation watches.

The newsroom erupts in chaos as Arjun, Ankita, the police, other broadcasters and the government all exploit terrorism for their own agenda. The only exception is Soumya, Arjun's ex-wife, a reporter who volunteers to report from the site of the terrorist attack. As the live show progresses, Arjun gradually realises how little control he has over the situation. The terrorist, who claims to be Raghubeer Mhata, a 50-something construction worker who lost three of his co-workers in a senseless industrial accident while fixing the bridge, says the families of the victims weren't compensated and demands a public apology from Minister Jaydev Patil. With several people remaining on the bridge, the terrorist threatens a second explosion. He also reveals to Arjun alone that he put a bomb in the anchor's earphone, and that if Patil doesn't apologise, the bomb will explode in his ear, live on air.

Patil's deputy, Subhash Mathur, arrives but refuses to apologise. Arjun realises that there is a bomb in Mathur's earpiece as well, and warns him discreetly but the caller observes this through CCTV footage and detonates the bomb in Mathur's earpiece, killing him. This leaves Arjun extremely scared but Ankita orders him to keep going. The caller threatens to detonate more explosives at the bridge, which would also kill Arjun's wife Saumya. Arjun requests him to come to the studio where the minister would give him an apology. This angers Ankita, who leaks information of Arjun having accepted a bribe to cover up the news of the construction workers losing their lives while repairing the bridge, which had led to him being demoted. It is also revealed that Arjun had won the "Journalist of the Year" award for a report he'd actually stolen from Saumya, which led to their divorce. All of this is telecast by another news channel. Ankita blackmails Arjun that he can save his career if he acts as per her orders.

The ATS traces the caller's location to a nearby building but it's a trap, and the caller blows up the building, the impact of which causes the studio to also get nearly destroyed. Arjun is gravely injured and realises that the caller is actually Raghubeer's son Anand, who wants to avenge the death of his father and coworkers, and that he has been calling from his very building. Arjun summons him to the studio, while everything is still being broadcast live. The caller arrives and reveals that he has planted an explosive in the building. He is then sniped down by the ATS, instantly killing him. Arjun finds out that the bridge has collapsed and many people have lost their lives, including Saumya. When Ankita finds out that instead of informing the police, Arjun had decided to exclusively cover this news, she leaks the information. Another news channel telecasts this, adding a false story of Arjun being actively involved in planning the attack, labelling him as an anti-national. Arjun, devastated, sends a voicemail to Saumya, apologising, then detonates the explosive in his building, causing it to collapse and kill him as well.

== Cast ==
- Kartik Aaryan as Arjun Pathak, a journalist, radio jockey, and the host of TRTV Bharosa 24/7
- Mrunal Thakur as Saumya Mehra Pathak, Arjun's ex-wife
- Amruta Subhash as Ankita Malaskar, Arjun's boss
- Vikas Kumar as Officer Praveen Kamath
- Vishwajeet Pradhan as Subhash Mathur, Minister Jaydev Patil's deputy
- Aeklavya Tomer as Asif Alam, Arjun's radio show producer
- Soham Majumdar as Anand Mhata / Raghubeer Mhata (as per claim on call)
- Aishwarya Chaudhary as Mala Singh
- Mahender Singh as Bisht Kumar, Ankita's assistant
- Ritviq Joshi as Raunaq Goyal
- Dilip Vasu as Jay Reddy
- Ashish Ranglani as Ashish Tripuri
- Dhwani Acharya as Ketki Sinha
- Anuj Gurwara as Manas Sethi, Ankita's fellow anchor
- Priya Tandon as Kripa Ved
- Samriddhi as Karuna Shah
- Tuhinanshu Chaturvedi as Abhimanyu Murth

== Production ==
=== Development ===
A remake of the Korean film The Terror Live (2013) was announced by Lionsgate Films and Global Gate Entertainment in collaboration with Sunir Kheterpal's Azure Entertainment in May 2018, along with other international projects. However, in a turn of developments, Kheterpal opted out of the project and it was later pitched by Ronnie Screwvala of RSVP Movies, with Ram Madhvani directing the film. Madhvani initially planned to present the feature as a female-centric film, referencing his previous works: Neerja (2016) and the web series Aarya (2020). He initially wrote the script with Taapsee Pannu in mind, but could not approach her for the film, and later Kriti Sanon was also considered for the project, who also refused the offer without giving a convincing reason.

He then dropped the idea, changing the narrative to a male-centric project and narrated the script to Kartik Aaryan accepting his part in the film, as it was his first serious role after a number of comical and romantic characters. The film featured Aaryan as the main lead, essaying the role of a news reporter named Arjun Pathak, who runs against time to save the city. Yami Gautam was initially reported to play the character of Arjun's wife, but she opted out of the film citing date clashes and was replaced by Mrunal Thakur. The film was officially announced on Aaryan's 30th birthday, i.e., 22 November 2020, also revealing the film's title as Dhamaka.

=== Filming ===
Ram sir had planned each scene down to the last detail, including where each actor would stand and what the camera angle would be. It saved the unit a lot of time, enabling them to shoot more than five scenes every day. While the shoot went overtime on a few occasions, they would usually call it a day after eight hours of filming.

— A source from the production team, about the completion of shooting within 10 days, to PTI

Principal photography began on 14 December 2020 in Mumbai. On 24 December 2020, it was announced that the makers wrapped the shooting of the film within 10 days. The director Madhvani had designed a detailed storyboard and ensured the team was prepped to avoid prolonged shoot schedules. 90% of the shooting was held indoors at a set erected at Renaissance Hotel in Powai, Mumbai, and the hotel was booked by the production unit, composed of more than 300 people. Adhering to the COVID-19 safety protocols, no outsiders were allowed inside the hotel and the entire unit was asked to stay put during the period, thus creating a bio-bubble of sorts.

Originally, the makers used multiple techniques to shoot the film within a single schedule, and planned to complete within 10 days, while the schedule consisted of 45–50 days. The team had used multiple cameras and multiple audio outputs — almost 21 microphones were used in order to capture each nuances. The B-roll (secondary footage) of the film was shot simultaneously along with the first footage of the film. The action sequences were shot outdoors. During the final day of the shoot held in outdoors, a rooftop scene featuring a helicopter was erected at green screen in a barren land.

=== Post-production ===
Post-production works of the film simultaneously began on 31 December 2020, a week after the shooting wrapped. The makers began dubbing works for the film during March 2021, and was completed within that April, after the lead actor Kartik Aaryan completed dubbing for his portions that month before the 15-day lockdown in Mumbai. It has been revealed that the post-production process has been completed within four months, except for computer graphics, visual and sound effects process, which took place after the lockdown. Madhvani collaborated with four visual effects studios to progress the work on the visual effects, since the film has heavy VFX-work. A scene where a bridge at Bandra–Worli Sea Link being blown apart, and how several other structures have been affected by the disaster, has been created with visual effects at various studios. Manas Choudhury, the film's sound designer, worked on the sound mixing of the film during September 2021. Other works such as digital intermediate and color grading, simultaneously progressed within the same month, so that the team could be ready with the final copy of the film within 15 days.

== Soundtrack ==
Dhamaka

Soundtrack album by Vishal Khurana K and Prateek Kuhad
- Released: 12 November 2021
- Recorded: 2021
- Genre: Feature film soundtrack
- Length: 9:36
- Language: Hindi
- Labels: Zee Music Company; Warner Music India

Official audio
- Dhamaka - Full Album on YouTube

The soundtrack and score for the film are composed by Vishal Khurana K, who previously collaborated with Ram Madhvani in Neerja (2016) and the streaming television series Aarya (2020). The film featured only one song titled "Khoya Paaya" which was sung by Amit Trivedi and Delraaz Bunshah and written by Puneet Sharma. A promotional video song of the track, shot by Ravi Varman and directed by Bejoy Nambiar, was released on 31 October 2021, where the film's team attended the sets of Bigg Boss 15 for promotional purposes. On 12 November 2021, Zee Music Company released the full album which also had a female version of this track crooned by Jasleen Royal, spanning the duration of the album to 6 minutes.

The song received positive response from music critics and listeners. Filmfare called the track "one of the best" and "most inspiring compositions of the year which sets the tone for the film". A reviewer from Mid-day stated the song as "music to the ears". Hindustan Times stated that "the theme of regret, helplessness, and anxiety matches with the lyrics of the track, thereby being crucial to the film's storyline. It is at the perfect length, conveying deep themes of sorrow and repentance. This song could be streamed on your playlist on loop."

On 15 November 2021, the makers released the film version of the track "Kasoor" originally performed, written, and sung by singer-songwriter Prateek Kuhad under licensed Warner Music India, and was picturized on Kartik and Mrunal in the film. This song was earlier released as an independent single in July 2020, during the COVID-19 lockdown period.

Track listing
No.	Title	Lyrics	Music	Singer(s)	Length
1.	"Khoya Paaya"	Puneet Sharma	Vishal Khurana K	Amit Trivedi, Delraaz Bunshah	4:00
2.	"Khoya Paaya" (Female Version)	Puneet Sharma	Vishal Khurana K	Jasleen Royal	2:19
3.	"Kasoor"	Prateek Kuhad	Prateek Kuhad	Prateek Kuhad	3:17
Total length:					9:36

== Release ==
Dhamaka was initially scheduled for theatrical release and the film's lead actor Aaryan had added a new clause in his agreement to producers in December 2020, which prevents his films to forgo theatrical release and premiere on a digital streaming service. However, in January 2021, the producers opted for a direct-to-digital release through the streaming platform Netflix. The first teaser of the film was released on 2 March 2021 by Netflix India, thus confirming the digital release. It was considered as one of the 41 Indian contents slated for an exclusive release through the platform, and also happened to be Aaryan's debut on a digital streamer. The rights were sold to the platform at a sum ₹85–135 crore (US$12–19 million), (Note: According to the sources Pinkvilla and Filmfare, the digital rights of the film were estimated to be ₹85 crore, but in April 2021, the deal was reported to be around ₹135 crore.) the highest ever for a Hindi film surpassing Laxmii (which was sold to Disney+ Hotstar to ₹110 crore).

The film was scheduled for release on 30 December 2020, but post-production delays prompted the makers to postpone the release to September. In July 2021, the makers announced that the film will be released in October 2021, during the festive season around Navratri and Dusshera, but it was later revealed that the film would be released on the occasion of Diwali (5 November 2021). A special teaser was unveiled at the Tudum Festival by Netflix on 25 September 2021.

The film's release date is said to be preponed to late-October 2021, following the government's permission to reopen theatres in Maharashtra from 22 October 2021. However, the makers announced that the film will be released on 19 November 2021. Netflix further planned to conduct a special screening at the 52nd edition of International Film Festival of India to be held from 20 to 28 November, with the platform's other film, Jane Campion-directorial The Power of the Dog (2021). Ahead of the release, a special screening was held in Mumbai on 17 November.

== Reception ==
=== Critical response ===
On the review aggregator website Rotten Tomatoes, 38% of 16 critics' reviews are positive, with an average rating of 4.8/10.

Shubhra Gupta from The Indian Express gave the film 1 star out of 5 and wrote, "Even the worst TV channels in real life with their shrieking guests and poisonous debates have more drama than the goings-on in this fictional Bharosa 24/7. Everything that's happening on screen feels contrived and improbable. The whole film feels like a set. And everyone feels like they are acting out set-pieces in this Netflix thriller." Writing for the same publication, Rohan Naahar stated "Equally angry at the corrupt politicians who exploit the common person and the greedy news media that enables them, the film captures the mood of the nation. Packaged as a populist piece of entertainment, it lives up to its attention-grabbing title. The clickbait-and-switch, however, is deftly executed."

Saibal Chatterjee from NDTV gave the film 2.5 stars (out of 5) rating and said that the film "does throw up a few tense moments and some surprises along the way but, despite what is at stake, is overall a rather tepid affair". Renuka Vyavahare of The Times of India gave the film a rating of 3 out of 5 stars and stated that the film "may not be explosive enough to change the narrative" but "makes for an engaging hostage thriller". Anupama Chopra on the website Film Companion stated, "Dhamaka isn't a bad film but doesn't match Ram Madhvani's previous works — Neerja and the series Aarya". She further called the film as a passable thriller with criticism directed on the scenario and writing. Nandini Ramnath of Scroll.in said, "The 104-minute film is packed with nervous energy, convincing visual effects and serviceable performances from the cast." She further praised Aaryan's performance saying that he "is cleverly cast as the smarmy and jaded journalist who is forced to find the spine that he didn't know he still had. Despite going overboard in the crucial scenes, Aaryan makes the most of a largely unsympathetic character."

Devansh Sharma of Firstpost gave the film 3.5 stars (out of 5 stars) and wrote, "Director Ram Madhvani masterfully blends the unrehearsed tension that arises from his natural way of filming with a promising premise on paper to create a taut thriller." Bollywood Hungama gave 3 out of 5 stars and stated it as an "edge of the seat thriller that boasts of fine performances (particularly Aaryan's)", but criticised the second half. Stutee Ghosh from The Quint website gave the fim a positive review with a rating of 3 out of 5 stars and said, "The compact runtime and performances of Kartik Aryan makes the film watchable. Ram Madhvani knows when and how to dial up the tension, give us just enough information so we know what's happening and are hungrier for more." Anuj Kumar of The Hindu wrote "The disturbing thoughts swim in the conscience as one could clearly hear the sound of social implosion in Ram Madhvani's compelling thriller, lined with commentary on media ethics".

Sify-based critic Sonia Chopra wrote "Dhamaka explores how class inequality, constantly brushed under the carpet and normalized, is bound to explode in one way or the other." Sukanya Verma of Rediff.com gave 2.5 stars and stated "Dhamaka doesn't always hit the right buttons and Kartik Aaryan is a puny choice for a role of enormous calibre and incessant focus". Shilajit Mitra of The New Indian Express wrote "Dhamaka toys with the idea that news-making is steeped in drama. But the film, as a work of fiction, could have sold this point better by avoiding the manipulations it is seeking to spurn. It never does." Daily News and Analysis-based editor Mugdha Kapoor Safaya wrote "even though the script and dialogues lack at some points in the film, Ram Madhvani's direction in the restricted space of one newsroom while capturing every heightened emotion during a breaking news scenario through multiple camera setup is fabulous and shows you the marvel of Madhvani's work yet again".

Anupama Chopra of Film Companion wrote, "Ultimately, the scenario is too outlandish and the writing, too ordinary."
