= Zee Cine Critics Award for Best Actor – Male =

Indian acting award

Zee Cine Critics Award for Best Actor
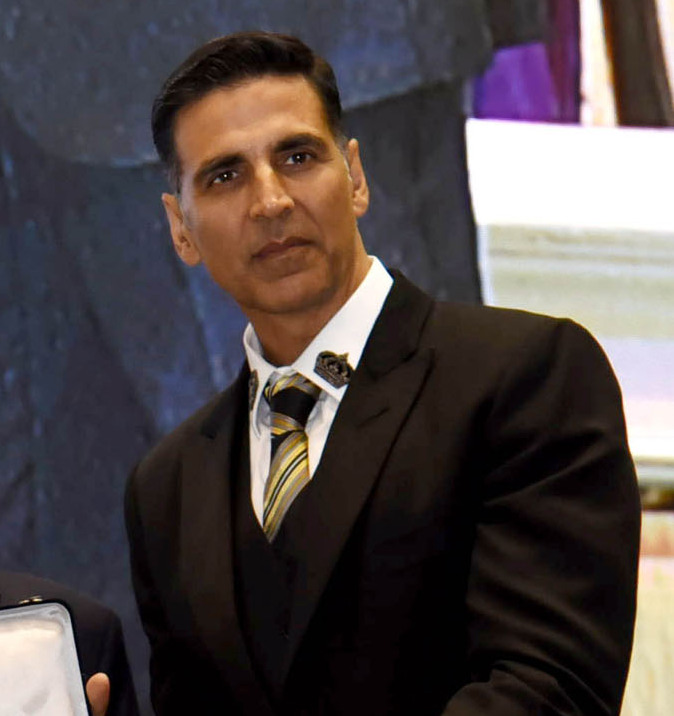
- The 2026 recipient: Akshay Kumar
- Awarded for: Best Performance by an Actor in a Leading Role
- Country: India
- Presented by: Zee Entertainment Enterprises
- First award: Pankaj Kapur, Maqbool (2005)
- Currently held by: Akshay Kumar, Kesari Chapter 2 (2026)

The Zee Cine Critics' Choice Award for Best Actor is chosen by a jury organized by Zee Entertainment Enterprises.

== Multiple wins ==
- 2 Wins : Amitabh Bachchan, Hrithik Roshan, Shah Rukh Khan, Kartik Aaryan, Ranbir Kapoor, Ranveer Singh

== Winners ==
=== Critics Award for Best Actor – Male ===
Year	Winner	Film	Character
2005	Pankaj Kapur	Maqbool	Jahangir Khan (Abbaji)
2006	Shreyas Talpade	Iqbal	Iqbal
2007	Sanjay Dutt	Lage Raho Munna Bhai	Murli Prasad Sharma (Munna Bhai)
2008	Darsheel Safary	Taare Zameen Par	Ishaan Awasthi a.k.a. Inu
2009	No Award Ceremony		
2010	No Award Ceremony		
2011	Hrithik Roshan	Guzaarish	Ethan Mascarenhas
2012	Shah Rukh Khan	Don 2	Don
2013	Ranbir Kapoor	Barfi!	Murphy "Barfi" Johnson
2014	Farhan Akhtar	Bhaag Milkha Bhaag	Subedar Milkha Singh
2014	Ranveer Singh	Lootera	Varun Srivastava/Atmanand Tripathi
2015	No Award Ceremony		
2016	Amitabh Bachchan	Piku	Bhashkor Banerjee
2016	Ranveer Singh	Bajirao Mastani	Bajirao
2017	Amitabh Bachchan	Pink	Deepak Sehgal
2018	Varun Dhawan	Badrinath Ki Dulhania	Badrinath "Badri" Bansal
2019	Ranbir Kapoor	Sanju	Sanjay Dutt
2020	Hrithik Roshan	Super 30	Anand Kumar
2021	No Award Ceremony		
2022	No Award Ceremony		
2023	Kartik Aaryan	Bhool Bhulaiyaa 2	Ruhan Randhawa / Rooh Baba
2024	Shah Rukh Khan	Jawan	Vikram Rathod & Aazad
2025	Kartik Aaryan	Chandu Champion	Murlikant Petkar
2025	Vikrant Massey	Sector 36	Prem Singh
2026	Akshay Kumar	Kesari Chapter 2	Justice Chettoor Sankaran Nair

=== Outstanding Performance – Male ===
Year	Winner	Film	Character
2002	Sunny Deol	Gadar: Ek Prem Katha	Tara Singh

Note: The Outstanding Performance Award was discontinued after 2002 and was later revived in 2005 as the Jury’s Choice Award for Best Actor.

== See also ==
- Zee Cine Awards
- Bollywood
- Cinema of India
