= Sonu Ke Titu Ki Sweety =

2018 Indian film directed by Luv Ranjan

- Directed by: Luv Ranjan
- Written by: Rahul Mody; Luv Ranjan
- Story by: Luv Ranjan
- Produced by: Bhushan Kumar; Krishan Kumar; Luv Ranjan; Ankur Garg
- Starring: Kartik Aaryan; Nushrat Bharucha; Sunny Singh
- Cinematography: Sudhir K. Chaudhary
- Edited by: Akiv Ali
- Music by: Score: Hitesh Sonik; Songs: Rochak Kohli; Yo Yo Honey Singh; Amaal Mallik; Guru Randhawa; Zack Knight; Saurabh-Vaibhav; Rajat Nagpal
- Production companies: T-Series Films; Luv Films
- Distributed by: AA Films
- Release date: 23 February 2018
- Running time: 138 minutes
- Country: India
- Language: Hindi
- Budget: ₹25 crore
- Box office: ₹152–156 crore

Sonu Ke Titu Ki Sweety (transl. Sonu's Titu's Sweety), also abbreviated as SKTKS, is a 2018 Indian Hindi-language romantic comedy film written and directed by Luv Ranjan. Produced by Luv Films and T-Series Films, the film was written by Luv Ranjan and Rahul Mody and edited by Akiv Ali. It stars Kartik Aaryan, Nushrat Bharucha and Sunny Singh. The film was released theatrically on 23 February 2018.

The film is Ranjan's fourth collaboration with Aaryan and Bharucha, and third with Singh.

Upon release, Sonu Ke Titu Ki Sweety became a surprise blockbuster and broke several box-office records for a low budget film with no established stars. It entered the 100 Crore Club in India net. The film grossed ₹152–156 crore in its lifetime theatrical run, emerging as a huge box office success. It is one of the highest-grossing Bollywood films of 2018.

== Plot ==
Titu is grief-stricken as his girlfriend Pihu refuses to talk to him. Sonu, his best friend tells him she is not meant for him, as Titu is loving and caring while Pihu is possessive and callous. Sonu gives an ultimatum to Titu to choose between Pihu and him and Titu chooses him, breaking up with Pihu.

Six months later, during a meal, the Sharmas tell Titu that a family is interested in getting him married to their caring and sensitive daughter, Sweety, who is seemingly the 'ideal partner'. Sonu finds this very fishy but admits to Titu that she seems nice. He later finds out Sweety was going to marry another man, Rahul but that didn't work out as he was dominating, possessive, and once even drunk and created a scene in Goa. The family inquires Sweety about the incident in which she clarifies.

On the engagement night, Sonu begins warming up to the idea of Titu and Sweety's wedding. However, she reveals to him in person that she is a control freak and warns him that he will be first one she intends to throw out of Titu's life and home. Sonu confides in Titu's grandfather Ghasitaram about the revelation. They bet between themselves to see if he can save Titu from Sweety. Titu is now engaged to Sweety.

She changes their caretaker and walks in on Sonu making out with a girl. She manipulates the family members and Titu into buying and naming a house after them. She turns it into a vegetarian household and controls Ghasitaram by threatening to reveal his dirty lies to Titu's grandmother. Sonu foresees Titu's imminent downfall; to protect him, he plans a bachelor party for Titu in Amsterdam.

While in Amsterdam, Sonu arranges Pihu to "accidentally" run into them after convincing her that Titu is still in love with her and he wants to help them get back. They return to India with Pihu; Sonu is happy to see a bothered Sweety after witnessing the closeness between Titu and Pihu. But Sweety reveals to Pihu that it was Sonu who broke Titu and her up in the first place and that Sonu is using her. Titu learns the truth and turns Sonu away in anger.

Ghasitaram and Lalu volunteer to sort the situation but Sonu interjects saying Titu should decide for himself. Sonu helps prepare for the wedding but during the garland ceremony, he makes a final attempt and gives Titu the ultimatum again to choose between him and Sweety and walks away from the wedding in tears. Titu, in a fit of epiphany, reveals to Sweety that this is barely the second time he has ever seen Sonu cry, the first being three days after his mother's death when they were thirteen; his tears show what Titu means to him, and Titu firmly announces that if it is between Sonu or her, it will always be his best friend. The scene switches to Sweety standing in the mandap and coming to terms that her malicious tactics cannot always work.

After the narrow escape, Sonu, Titu, Ghasitaram, and Lalu are seen sitting and drinking by the pool, whilst Sonu discusses his own marriage plans, and tells them that he will settle before 30 .

== Cast ==
- Kartik Aaryan as Sonu Sharma
- Nushrratt Bharuccha as Sweety Sharma
- Sunny Singh as Titu Sharma
- Ishita Raj as Pihu Khanna
- Alok Nath as Ghasitaram "Ghasitey" Sharma, Titu's grandfather
- Virendra Saxena as Lalwant "Lalu" Bansal, Ghasitaram's best friend and Rukmani's brother
- Madhumalti Kapoor as Rukmani Sharma, Titu's grandmother
- Ayesha Raza as Manju Sharma, Titu's mother
- Pawan Chopra as Dharam Sharma, Titu's father
- Deepika Amin as Renuka "Renu" Sharma, Sweety's mother
- Rajesh Jais as Parag Sharma, Sweety's father
- Sonnalli Seygall in a special appearance as Sonu's girlfriend
- Sakshi Malik in the song "Bom Diggy Diggy"
- Alexandra Ri-Djavi in the song "Bom Diggy Diggy"
- Collins Twins in the song "Bom Diggy Diggy"
- Pritam Jaiswal as Babu

== Production ==
=== Development ===
Luv Ranjan made the announcement about the film through his official Twitter account on 6 December 2016.

"In India, they say that marriage happens between two families. But in cities, friends have become the new family. So for a marriage to work, it is imperative that your friends like the new person in your life and vice versa. It is saas-bahu with a twist."

— Luv Ranjan on the idea behind the movie Sonu Ke Titu Ki Sweety.

=== Filming ===
The shooting of the film has been done in Delhi, Ghaziabad, Noida, Mumbai, Rishikesh and Georgia. The shooting of the film in Ghaziabad has been done in Rajnagar Sector 5. The shooting of this movie has also been done in Gurugram DLF CyberHub. Some of the scenes were shot in Noida at Mahagun Moderne and Mahagun Marvella.

== Soundtrack ==
The film's soundtrack featured eight songs composed by Rochak Kohli, Yo Yo Honey Singh, Amaal Mallik, Guru Randhawa, Zack Knight, Saurabh-Vaibhav and Rajat Nagpal while lyrics have been penned by Kumaar, Yo Yo Honey Singh, Swapnil Tiwari, Zack Knight, Guru Randhawa, Singhsta and Oye Sheraa. The score is composed by Hitesh Sonik. The album was released by T-Series on 14 February 2018 on Valentine's Day.

== Box office ==
Sonu Ke Titu Ki Sweety collected ₹156.46 crore worldwide.

=== India ===
In India, Sonu Ke Titu Ki Sweety grossed ₹6.42 crore nett on its opening day. It earned ₹9.34 crore and ₹10.81 crore in its next two days respectively, taking total opening weekend collection to ₹26.57 crore. It managed to hold in working days, subsequently collecting ₹45.94 crore in its first week. The film grossed ₹29.77 crore and ₹17.93 crore in its second and third week respectively, thus having a three weeks total of ₹93.64 crore. Sonu Ke Titu Ki Sweety entered the 100 Crore Club in its fourth week on 25th day and collected ₹8.88 crore in that week. It ran for a total of 63 days (nine weeks) in cinemas and collected ₹4.25 crore, ₹1.69 crore, ₹0.37 crore, ₹0.10 crore and ₹0.02 crore in its fifth, sixth, seventh, eighth and ninth week respectively, thus taking its total nett lifetime collection to ₹108.95 crore in India. Box Office India declared Sonu Ke Titu Ki Sweety a blockbuster. The gross collection of the film in India is ₹139.46 crore.

== Reception ==
While some commentators praised the humour, some were critical of the misogynistic plot. On review aggregation website Rotten Tomatoes, the film has an approval score of 40% based on 10 reviews, with an average rating of 4/10.

Rajeev Masand of News18 gave the film a rating of 3 out of 5 and said that, "Sonu Ke Titu Ki Sweety has a strange kind of earnestness in its juvenile ambitions. I was uncomfortable with its decidedly women-bashing stand, but I enjoyed the film's silly, relentless humor." Shubhra Gupta of The Indian Express gave the film 2 stars out of 5; she wrote that the film was "breezey enough", and provides some laughs, some of which escape involuntarily. She responded negatively to the film's misogyny: "Luv Ranjan's fourth feature is as simplistic and sexist as it has been right from his first." She was also critical of the performances of the central duo of Singh and Aaryan. Renuka Vyavahare of The Times of India gave the film a rating of 3.5 out of 5 saying that, "Despite its misogynistic nature, Ranjan's lighthearted approach to counter gender stereotypes in modern relationships makes his take fascinating." Sweta Kausal of Hindustan Times gave the film a rating of 1 out of 5 and said that, "Nushrat Barucha, Karthik Aryan and Sunny Singh return in an unfunny tale with misogyny as its reigning feature." Sameeksha of News18 gave the film a rating of 1.5 out of 5 saying that, "the film is a great entertainer in the anti-women genre, but sadly for Ranjan, it is not a proper category yet and thus the film deserved to called a sexist, 'eye-roll' worthy ride which will leave you frustrated and angry by the end of it.".

== Awards and nominations ==
Date Of Ceremony	Awards	Category	Recipient(s) and nominee(s)	Result	Reference
December 2018	Nickelodeon Kids' Choice Awards India	Dynamic Performer Award	Kartik Aaryan	Won	
December 2018	25th Screen Awards	Best Music	Amaal Mallik, Guru Randhawa, Rochak Kohli, Saurabh Vaibhav, Yo Yo Honey Singh and Zack Knight – Sonu Ke Titu Ki Sweety	Nominated	
16 February 2019	Mirchi Music Awards	Listener's Choice Album of the Year	Sonu Ke Titu Ki Sweety	Won	
16 February 2019	Mirchi Music Awards	Listener's Choice Song of the Year	Dil Chori	Won	
16 February 2019	Mirchi Music Awards	Song of The Year	"Bom Diggy Diggy"	Nominated	
16 February 2019	Mirchi Music Awards	Album of The Year	Sonu Ke Titu Ki Sweety	Nominated	
16 February 2019	Mirchi Music Awards	Lyricist of The Year	Kumaar – "Tera Yaar Hoon Main"	Nominated	
16 February 2019	Mirchi Music Awards	Upcoming Female Vocalist of The Year	Jasmin Walia – "Bom Diggy Diggy"	Nominated	
23 March 2019	Filmfare Awards	Best Music Director	Rochak Kohli, Yo Yo Honey Singh, Amaal Malik, Guru Randhawa, Zack Knight, Saurabh Vaibhav and Rajat Nagpal	Nominated	
23 March 2019	Filmfare Awards	Best Lyricist	Kumaar – "Tera Yaar Hoon Main"	Nominated	
23 March 2019	Filmfare Awards	Best Male Playback Singer	Arijit Singh – "Tera Yaar Hoon Main"	Nominated	
