= Akiv Ali =

Indian filmmaker (born 1981)

- Born: Ali Aakiv; 1981 (age 44–45); New Delhi, India
- Occupations: Film editor Director

Akiv Ali is an Indian film editor and director who works in Hindi cinema.

== Career ==
Ali is known for editing films such as Once Upon a Time in Mumbai. He worked as an actor in the film Rog in 2005.

Akiv's debut directorial De De Pyaar De, starring Ajay Devgn, Tabu and Rakul Preet Singh released on 17 May 2019.

== Filmography ==
=== As editor ===
- Kash Aap Hamare Hote (2003)
- Saaya (2003)
- Footpath (2003)
- Inteha (2003)
- Paap (2003)
- Murder (2004)
- Tumsa Nahin Dekha: A Love Story (2004)
- Madhoshi (2004)
- Rog (2005)
- Zeher (2005)
- Koi Tujh Sa Kahaan (2005)
- Kalyug (2005)
- Gangster (2006)
- The Killer (2006)
- Woh Lamhe (2006)
- Life in a... Metro (2007)
- Khulay Asmaan Kay Neechay (2008)
- I Hate Luv Storys (2010)
- Once Upon a Time in Mumbaai (2010)
- The Dirty Picture (2011)
- Pyaar Ka Punchnama (2011)
- Love Mein Gum (2011)
- Agneepath (2012)
- Barfi! (2012)
- Akaash Vani (2013)
- Yeh Jawaani Hai Deewani (2013)
- Once Upon ay Time in Mumbai Dobaara! (2013)
- Gori Tere Pyaar Mein! (2013)
- Bang Bang! (2014)
- Brothers (2015)
- Pyaar Ka Punchnama 2 (2015)
- Kaabil (2017)
- Sonu Ke Titu Ki Sweety (2018)
- De De Pyaar De (2019)
- Laxmii (2020)
- Chhalaang (2020)
- Tu Jhoothi Main Makkaar (2023); co-edited with Chetan M. Solanki
- De De Pyaar De 2 (2025)

=== As director ===
- De De Pyaar De (2019)

=== As actor ===
- Rog (2005)
