= Pyaar Ka Punchnama =

2011 film by Luv Ranjan

- Directed by: Luv Ranjan
- Written by: Luv Ranjan
- Produced by: Abhishek Pathak
- Starring: Kartik Aaryan; Divyendu Sharma; Raayo S. Bakhirta; Sonnalli Seygall; Nushrat Bharucha; Ishita Raj Sharma
- Cinematography: Sudhir K. Chaudhary
- Edited by: Akiv Ali
- Music by: Songs: Clinton Cerejo; Hitesh Sonik; Luv Ranjan; AD Boyz; Score: Hitesh Sonik
- Production companies: Viacom18 Motion Pictures; Wide Frame Pictures
- Distributed by: Viacom18 Motion Pictures
- Release date: 20 May 2011
- Running time: 149 minutes
- Country: India
- Language: Hindi
- Budget: ₹3 crore
- Box office: ₹17.5 crore

Pyaar Ka Punchnama (transl. Post mortem of love) is a 2011 Indian Hindi-language romantic comedy buddy film written and directed by newbie Luv Ranjan. The film stars debutant Kartik Aaryan, Divyendu Sharma, Raayo S. Bakhirta, Nushrat Bharucha, Sonnalli Seygall and Ishita Raj Sharma and follows the story of three working bachelors who find girls whom they fall in love with and the twists and turns of the newly developing love stories. It was a sleeper hit at the box office, grossing ₹175 million (US$1.8 million) worldwide. A standalone sequel Pyaar Ka Punchnama 2 was released on 16 October 2015. It was remade in Telugu as Green Signal.

== Plot ==
Rajat "Rajjo" Mridul, Nishant "Liquid" Aggarwal, and Vikrant "Vicky" Chaudhary are working bachelors who live together in a flat in Noida.

Rajat falls in love with Neha. Nishant falls for Charu, who is his colleague. She makes him do a good part of her work in the office and makes him foot her beauty parlor bills. He is too naive to understand that she is only using him for financial assistance and moral support. Charu has a boyfriend, Abhijeet "Abhi", but they are not on the best of terms. Vikrant loves Rhea, who cannot get over her boyfriend of five years, Varun, a common friend of the two.

Rajat leaves the bachelor pad. Vikrant, however, is aware of Varun and knows that Rhea has not yet called off that relationship, but he does not mind waiting because he is besotted. On her part, Rhea keeps assuring him that she will end the relationship but ends up sleeping with Varun while she is dating Vikrant.

Missing their meetings and bar-hopping, the trio decides to take a time-out by themselves. All three women, however, find out and decide to accompany them to the beach, where they eventually mingle. Charu here kisses Nishant, while Rajat has a fight with Neha back at home. Charu starts to ignore Nishant and ends up eventually insulting him openly at work. Rajat and Neha eventually work out their differences, but, soon after, further problems arise between them (such as Neha's constant tantrums). Rajat becomes so frustrated that he walks out on Neha, telling her that she is 'not worthy of him'. Nishant goes into depression but is brought back to reality by Vikrant and Rajat, who drive him to Charu's house. Nishant slaps Abhi. Vikrant finds out that Rhea slept with her ex and leaves her.

In the end, the trio is seen sitting together, laughing and feeling happy with the moment they have with each other. In the end credits, the three women whom the trio fell for are shown having new boyfriends.

== Cast ==
- Kartik Aaryan as Rajat Mridul a.k.a. Rajjo
- Raayo S. Bakhirta as Vikrant Chaudhary a.k.a. Vicky
- Divyendu Sharma as Nishant Aggarwal a.k.a. Liquid
- Nushrat Bharucha as Neha
- Sonnalli Seygall as Rhea
- Ishita Raj Sharma as Charu Sharma
- Padam Bhola as Varun Bahl
- Ravjeet Singh as Abhijeet "Abhi" Sharda

== Critical reception ==
Taran Adarsh of Bollywood Hungama gave the film 3.5 stars out of 5, saying that "On the whole, Pyaar Ka Punchnama has a single-point plan of engaging and amusing the spectators by telling a story that is unusual, yet relevant. It's a radiantly good cinema that needs to be lauded and encouraged. Strongly recommended, go for it!"

Subhash K. Jha of Now Running gave 3.5 stars on a scale of 5, commenting that "Pyaar Ka Punchnama is a delightful rugged romantic-comedy."

Nikhat Kazmi of Times of India gave 3 stars out of 5, noting that "The film had promise and does have a few funny sequences. But by and large, it's a case of promises unfulfilled."

Blessy Chettiar of DNA India gave the movie 3 stars on a scale of 5, concluding that "The only problem with PKP is its running time. The second half seems never-ending, sappy and pleading for sympathy."

Swati Bhattacharyya of Daily Bhaskar gave 2.5 stars out of 5, saying that "It’s a youth-centric rom-com, watch it to see the contemporary take on love with twists and turns. Whether your relationship is a dangerous warning, if your brain can’t tell you at this moment, Pyaar Ka Punchnama will definitely give you an answer. It’s entertaining and fun-filled. Don’t go if you are expecting a conventional romantic movie as it may qualify to be blasphemous and a sex comedy."

Anupama Chopra of NDTV Movies gave 2 stars in a scale of 5, commenting that "Pyaar Ka Punchnama, starts out with some promise, echoing Dil Chahta Hai with a laid-back, buddy vibe but that evaporates as soon as the women appear.".

Shaikh Ayaz of Rediff gave the movie 2 stars on a scale of 5, concluding that "Pyaar Ka Punchnama is halfway funny but soon descends into a running commentary on why relationships with women are impossible and eventually wends its way to a very implausible end. It could have definitely done with some editing. If it were crisper, with more thought put into its script, situations, and dialogue, Pyaar Ka Punchnama would have made the cut."

Mayank Shekhar of Hindustan Times gave 2 stars out of 5, saying that "The movie acquires rhythms of a TV show, like so many do. We're already in the fifth season by the end of it. Though if this were a TV show, it'd be closest to an authentic Indian version of Friends, or How I Met Your Mother."

Rajeev Masand of CNN-IBN gave 1.5 stars in a scale of 5, commenting that "Disguised as a light-hearted comedy, Pyaar Ka Punchnama is such a film that you can't help but wonder if it was made by someone who's had his heart brutally stamped on by a woman."

Sonia Chopra of Sify gave 1.5 stars on a scale of 5, noting that "The film claims that men are victims."

== Awards ==
- Pyaar Ka Punchnama was screened at the Indian Film Festival in Berlin and was widely appreciated by the audience.
- It got a roaring applause at a special screening in a director's cut section in October 2012, held at the annual cultural fest of IIT Kanpur, Antaragini 2012.
- 4th Mirchi Music Awards: Upcoming Music Composer of The Year – Hitesh Sonik for "Baanwre" – Nominated

== Soundtrack ==
All lyrics have been written by Luv Ranjan.

- "Life Sahi Hai"
  - Singers :- Benny Dayal, Vishal Dadlani, KK, Sid Cuotto; Composer :- Clinton Cerejo
- "Chak Glassy"
  - Singer :- Suzanne D'Mello; Composer :- AD Boyz
- "Baawre"
  - Singer :- Clinton Cerejo; Composer :- Hitesh Sonik
- "Koi Aa Raha"
  - Singer :- Suraj Jagan; Composer :- Hitesh Sonik
- "Ban Gaya Kutta"
  - Singer :- Mika Singh; Composer :- Luv Ranjan
- "Ishq Na Kariyo Kaake"
  - Singer :- Mika Singh; Composer :- Clinton Cerejo

== Sequel ==
Pyaar Ka Punchnama 2 is a standalone sequel to the film. The sequel is directed by Luv Ranjan and produced by Viacom 18 Motion Pictures and Panorama Studios Production. The film stars Kartik Aaryan, Omkar Kapoor, Sunny Singh, Nushrat Bharucha, Ishita Raj Sharma and Sonnalli Seygall. It was released on 16 October 2015.
