= Adams Bridge =

Adams Bridge or variations may refer to:

== South Asia ==
- Adam's Bridge, also known as Rama Setu or Ram Setu, a chain of natural limestone shoals between India and Sri Lanka, perhaps formerly constituting a land bridge
  - Rama Setu (Ramayana), a bridge built by Rama as described in the Ramayana, identified with Adam's Bridge
  - Sethubandhanam, another term for the above
  - Ram Setu (film), 2022 Indian film about the bridge

== United States ==
- Hal W. Adams Bridge, a suspension bridge in Florida
- Adams Street Bridge, in Chicago, Illinois
- Adams Covered Bridge, listed on the National Register of Historic Places (NRHP) in Ohio
- Adams Mill Covered Bridge, listed on the NRHP in Indiana

== See also ==
- Damia Bridge, over the Jordan River between the West Bank and Jordan, also known as Adam Bridge
- Adam Viaduct, railway underbridge in Wigan, United Kingdom
- Sethubandhanam (disambiguation)
- Sethu (disambiguation)
- SETU (disambiguation)
- Sethupathi (disambiguation)
