= 68th Filmfare Awards =

2023 awards for Hindi cinema

- Presented on: 27 April 2023
- Site: Jio World Centre, Mumbai
- Hosted by: Salman Khan, Ayushmann Khurana; Maniesh Paul
- Organized by: The Times Group
- Official website: Filmfare Awards 2023

Highlights
- Best Film: Gangubai Kathiawadi
- Best Director: Sanjay Leela Bhansali for Gangubai Kathiawadi
- Best Actor: Rajkummar Rao for Badhaai Do
- Best Actress: Alia Bhatt for Gangubai Kathiawadi
- Critics Award for Best Film: Badhaai Do
- Most awards: Gangubai Kathiawadi (11)
- Most nominations: Gangubai Kathiawadi (17)

Television coverage
- Network: Colors TV

The 68th Filmfare Awards was a ceremony, presented by The Times Group, honored the best Indian Hindi-language films of 2022.

Gangubai Kathiawadi led the ceremony with 17 nominations, and won a leading 11 awards, including Best Film, Best Director (for Sanjay Leela Bhansali) and Best Actress (for Alia Bhatt).

Badhaai Do won 6 awards, including Best Film (Critics), Best Actor (for Rajkummar Rao), Best Actress (Critics) (for Bhumi Pednekar) and Best Supporting Actress (for Sheeba Chaddha), and Brahmāstra: Part One – Shiva won 5 awards, including Best Music Director (for Pritam), Best Lyricist (for Amitabh Bhattacharya) and Best Male Playback Singer (for Arijit Singh), the latter two for the song "Kesariya".

Sheeba Chaddha received dual nominations for Best Supporting Actress for her performances in Badhaai Do and Doctor G, winning the award for the former.

== Ceremony ==
Held at Jio World Centre, the 68th Filmfare Awards honored the films released in 2022. At a press conference helmed by editor of Filmfare magazine, Jitesh Pillai revealed Hyundai as the title sponsor. It was announced that actors Salman Khan and Ayushmann Khurana and Manish Paul were announced as the co-hosts, while actors Tiger Shroff, Vicky Kaushal, Kartik Aaryan, Jacqueline Fernandez, Janhvi Kapoor, Varun Dhawan and Govinda would perform during the ceremony. It took place on 27 April 2023, and was broadcast on 28 April 2023 on Colors TV.

== Winners and nominees ==
The nominations were announced by Filmfare on 24 April 2023.

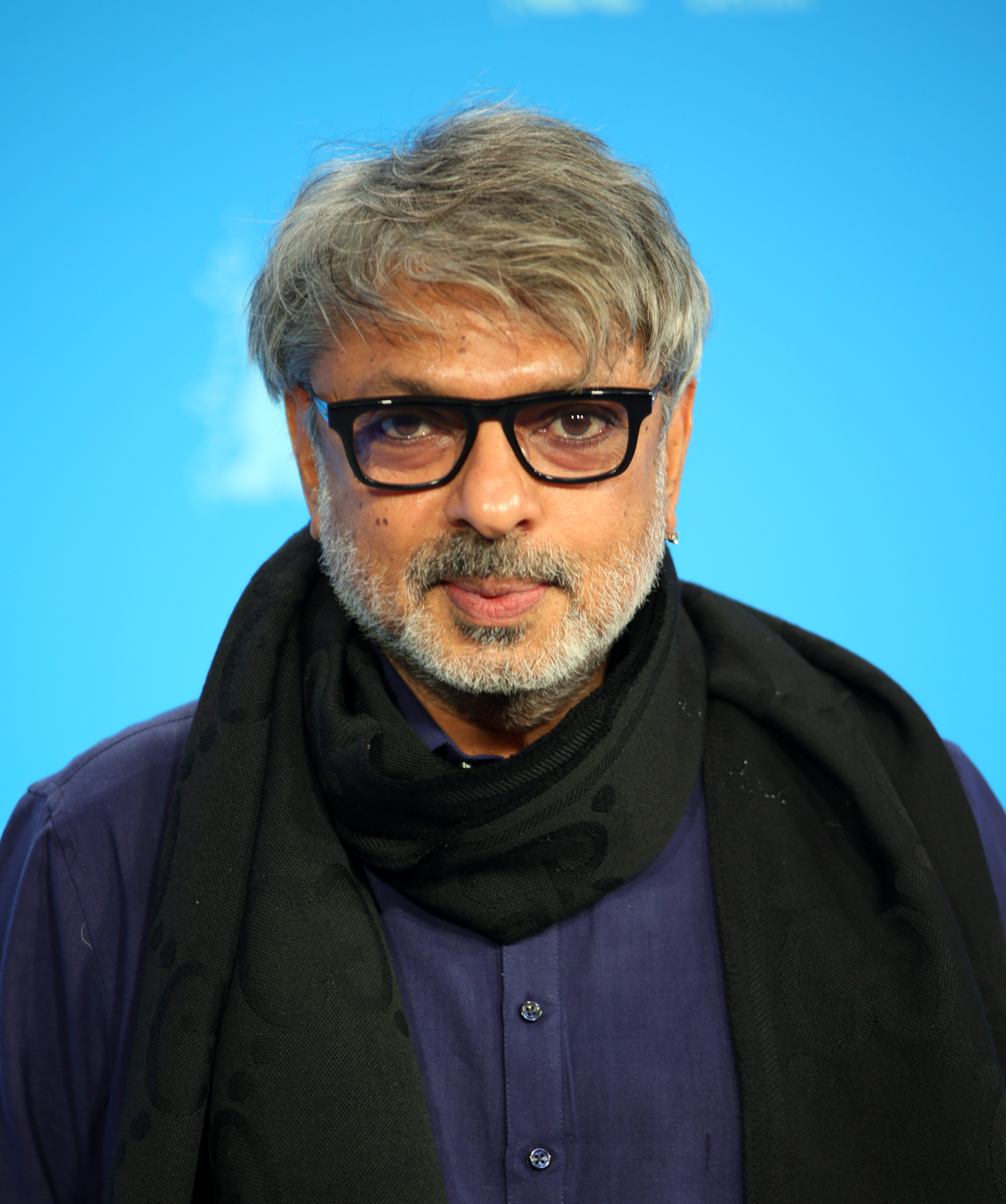
Sanjay Leela Bhansali, Best Director

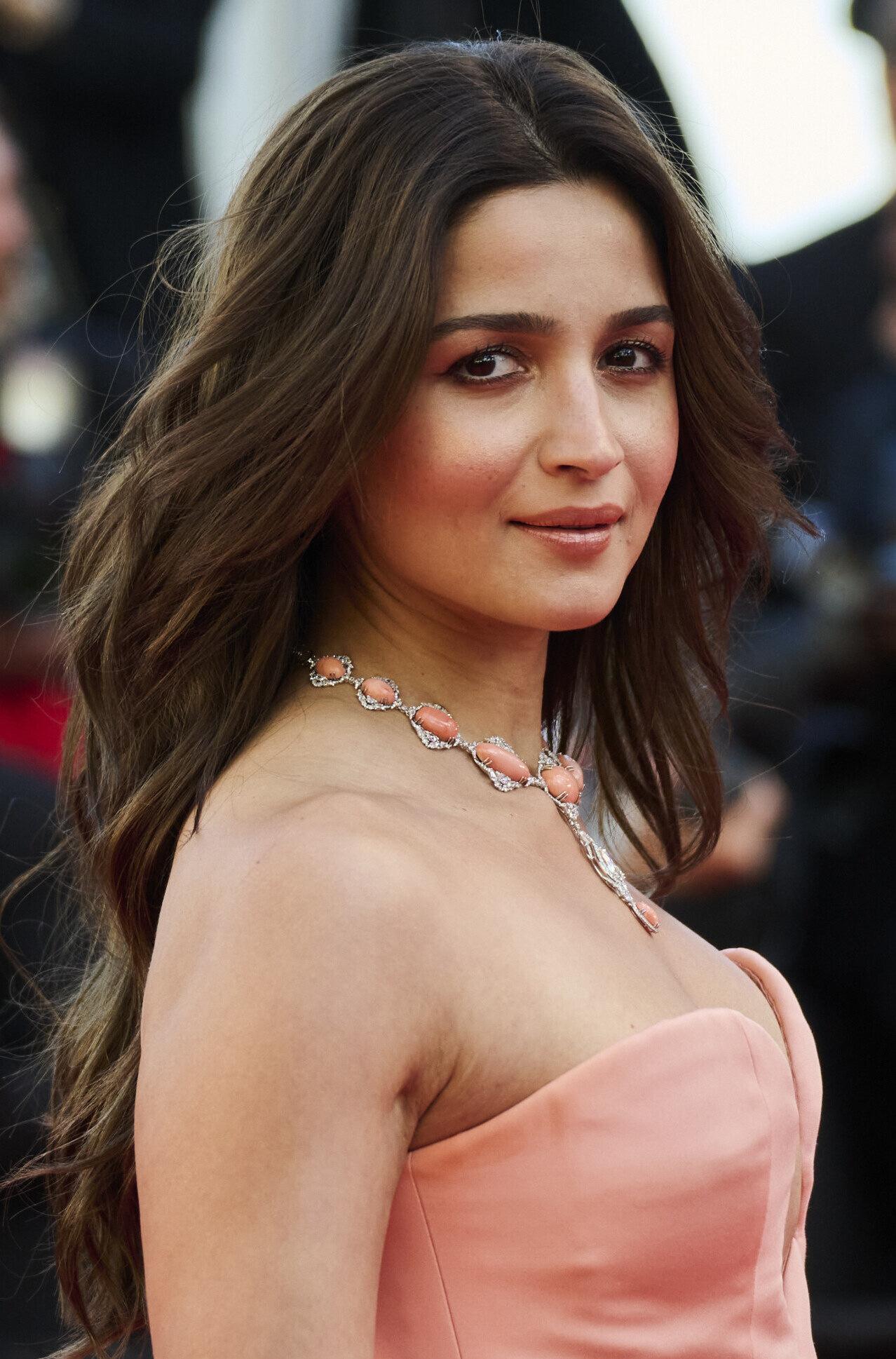
Alia Bhatt, Best Actress

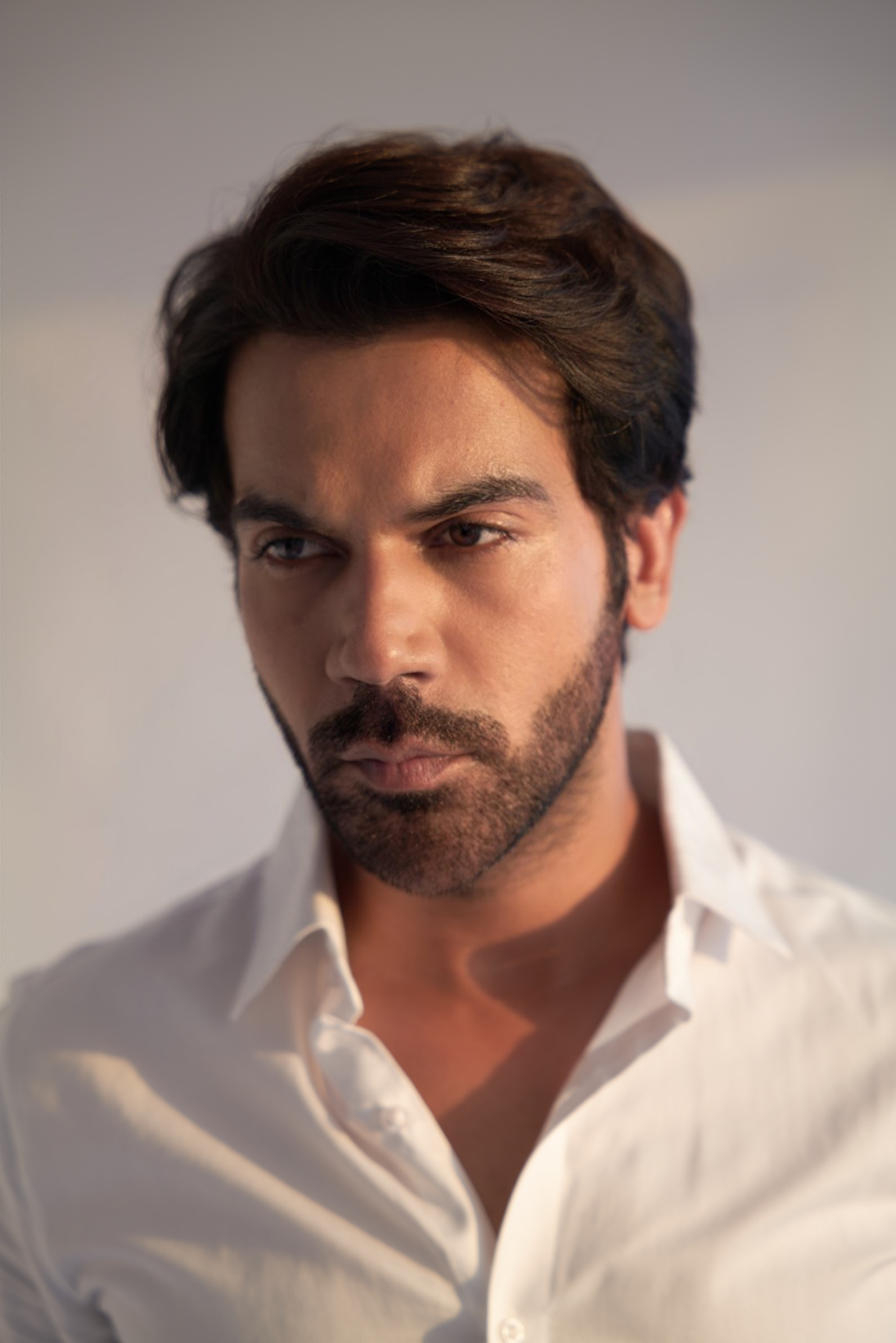
Rajkummar Rao, Best Actor

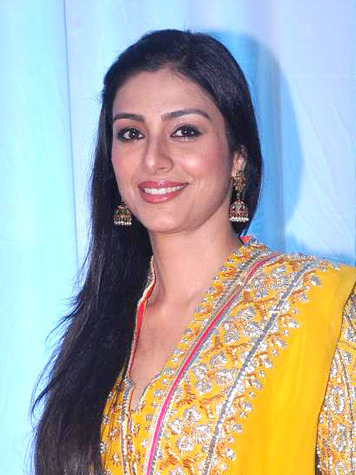
Tabu, Best Actress Critics co-winner

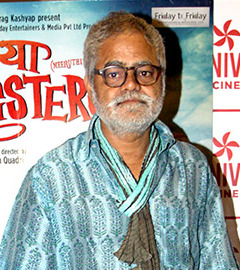
Sanjay Mishra, Best Actor Critics

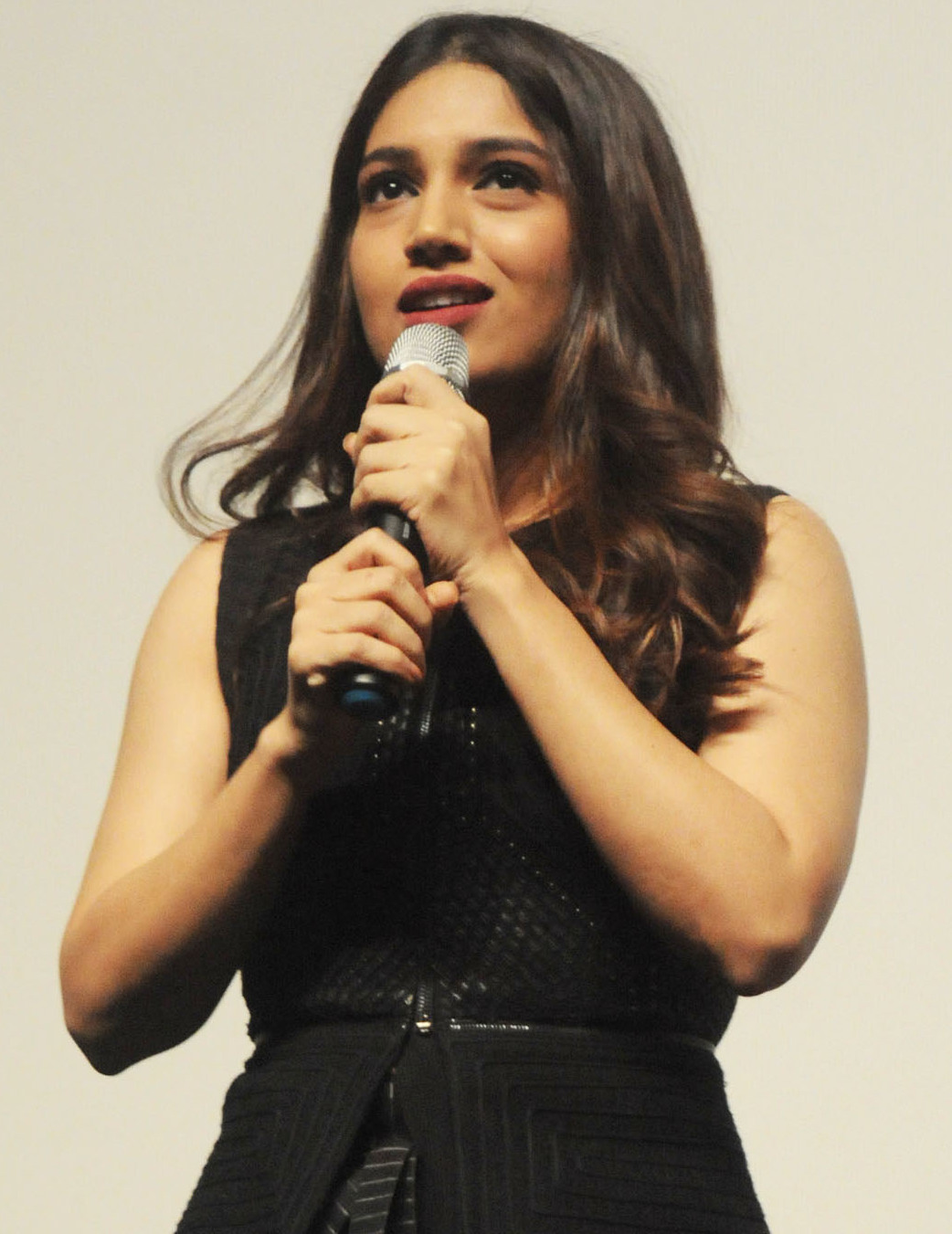
Bhumi Pednekar, Best Actress Critics co-winner

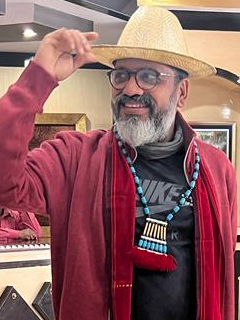
Harshavardhan Kulkarni, Best Director Critics

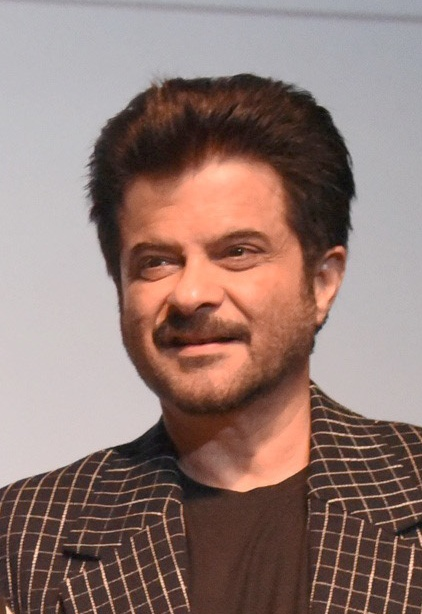
Anil Kapoor, Best Supporting Actor

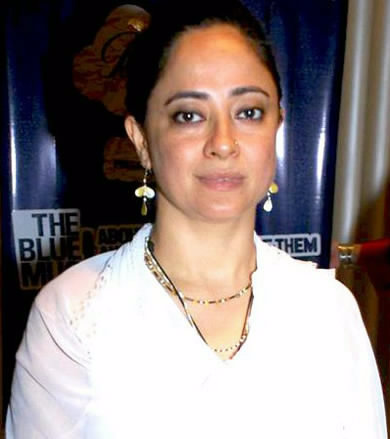
Sheeba Chaddha, Best Supporting Actress

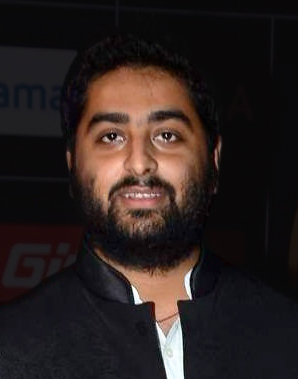
Arijit Singh, Best Male Playback Singer

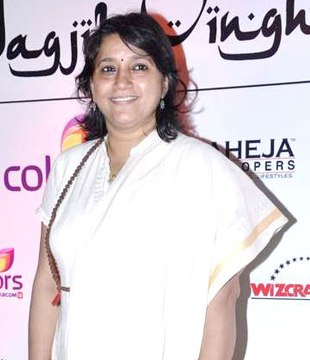
Kavita Seth, Best Female Playback Singer

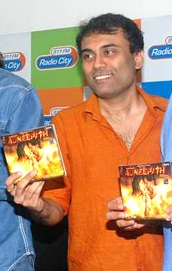
Amitabh Bhattacharya, Best Lyricist

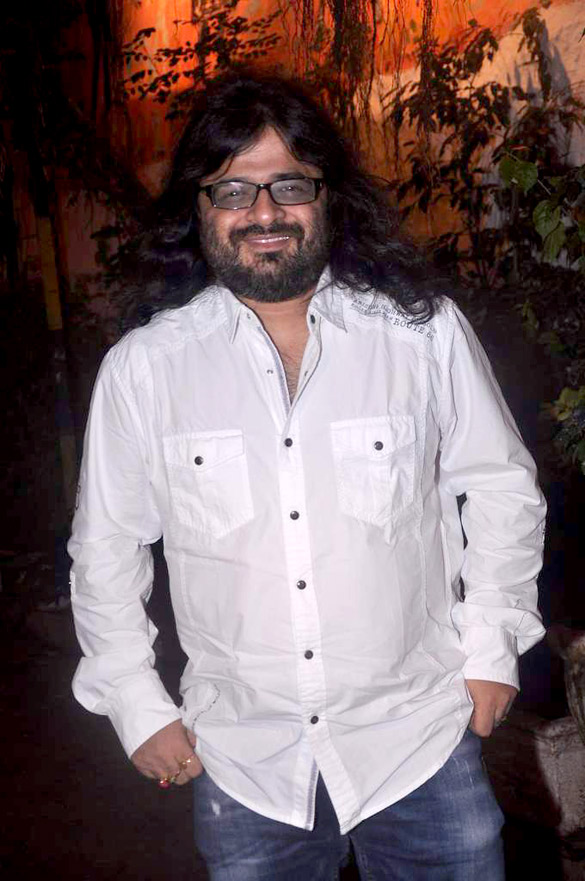
Pritam, Best Music Director

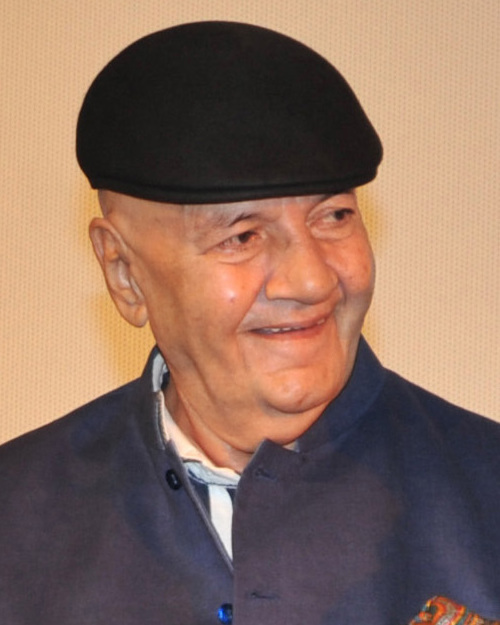
Prem Chopra, Lifetime Achievement Awardee

=== Popular awards ===
Best Film		Best Director
Gangubai Kathiawadi – Bhansali Productions, Pen India Limited; Badhaai Do – Junglee Pictures, Zee Studios; Bhool Bhulaiyaa 2 – T-Series Films, Cine1 Studios; Brahmāstra: Part One – Shiva – Dharma Productions, Star Studios, Prime Focus, Starlight Pictures; The Kashmir Files – Zee Studios, Abhishek Agarwal Arts; Uunchai – Rajshri Productions, Mahaveer Jain Films, Boundless Media		Sanjay Leela Bhansali – Gangubai Kathiawadi; Anees Bazmee – Bhool Bhulaiyaa 2; Ayan Mukerji – Brahmāstra: Part One – Shiva; Harshavardhan Kulkarni – Badhaai Do; Sooraj Barjatya – Uunchai; Vivek Agnihotri – The Kashmir Files
Best Actor		Best Actress
Rajkummar Rao – Badhaai Do as Shardul Thakur; Ajay Devgn – Drishyam 2 as Vijay Salgaonkar; Amitabh Bachchan – Uunchai as Amit Srivastava; Anupam Kher – The Kashmir Files as Pushkar Nath Pandit; Hrithik Roshan – Vikram Vedha as Vedha Betal; Kartik Aaryan – Bhool Bhulaiyaa 2 as Ruhaan Randhawa a.k.a. Rooh Baba		Alia Bhatt – Gangubai Kathiawadi as Gangubai; Bhumi Pednekar – Badhaai Do as Suman 'Sumi' Singh; Janhvi Kapoor – Mili as Mili Naudiyal; Kareena Kapoor Khan – Laal Singh Chaddha as Rupa D'Souza Chaddha; Tabu – Bhool Bhulaiyaa 2 as Anjulika Chatterjee and Manjulika Chatterjee
Best Supporting Actor		Best Supporting Actress
Anil Kapoor – Jugjugg Jeeyo as Bheem Saini; Anupam Kher – Uunchai as Om Sharma; Darshan Kumar – The Kashmir Files as Krishna Pandit; Gulshan Devaiah – Badhaai Do as Guru Narayan; Jaideep Ahlawat – An Action Hero as Bhoora Singh Solanki; Manish Paul – Jugjugg Jeeyo as Gurpreet Sharma; Mithun Chakraborty – The Kashmir Files as IAS Brahma Dutt		Sheeba Chaddha – Badhaai Do as Mrs. Thakur; Mouni Roy – Brahmāstra: Part One – Shiva as Junoon; Neetu Kapoor – Jugjugg Jeeyo as Geeta Saini; Sheeba Chaddha – Doctor G as Shobha Gupta, Shefali Shah – Doctor G as Dr. Nandini Srivastav; Simran – Rocketry: The Nambi Effect as Meena Narayanan
Debut Awards
Best Male Debut	Best Female Debut	Best Debut Director
Ankush Gedam – Jhund as Ankush Masram; Abhay Mishr – Doctor G as Abhishek Chandel; Paalin Kabak – Bhediya as Jomin; Shantanu Maheshwari – Gangubai Kathiawadi as Afsaan Badr-ur-Razzaq	Andrea Kevichüsa – Anek as Aido; Khushali Kumar – Dhokha: Round D Corner as Saanchi Sinha; Manushi Chhillar – Samrat Prithviraj as Sanyogita; Prajakta Koli – Jugjugg Jeeyo as Ginny Saini	Jaspal Singh Sandhu And Rajeev Barnwal – Vadh; Anirudh Iyer – An Action Hero; Anubhuti Kashyap – Doctor G; Jai Basantu Singh – Janhit Mein Jaari; R. Madhavan – Rocketry: The Nambi Effect
Writing Awards
Best Story	Best Screenplay	Best Dialogue
Akshat Ghildial and Suman Adhikary – Badhaai Do; Anirudh Iyer – An Action Hero; Jaspal Singh Sandhu And Rajeev Barnwal – Vadh; Niren Bhatt – Bhediya; Sunil Gandhi – Uunchai	Harshavardhan Kulkarni, Akshat Ghildial and Suman Adhikary – Badhaai Do; Aakash Kaushik – Bhool Bhulaiyaa 2; Jaspal Singh Sandhu And Rajeev Barnwal – Vadh; Neeraj Yadav – An Action Hero; Sanjay Leela Bhansali and Utkarshini Vashishtha – Gangubai Kathiawadi; Vivek Ranjan Agnihotri – The Kashmir Files	Prakash Kapadia and Utkarshini Vashishtha – Gangubai Kathiawadi; Abhishek Dixit – Uunchai; Akshat Ghildial – Badhaai Do; Manoj Muntashir and B. S. Fida – Vikram Vedha; Neeraj Yadav – An Action Hero; Sumit Saxena – Doctor G
Music Awards
Best Music Director		Best Lyricist
Pritam – Brahmāstra: Part One – Shiva; Amit Trivedi – Uunchai; Pritam – Laal Singh Chaddha; Sachin–Jigar – Bhediya; Sanjay Leela Bhansali – Gangubai Kathiawadi		Amitabh Bhattacharya – "Kesariya" – Brahmāstra: Part One – Shiva; A. M. Turaz – "Jab Saiyaan" – Gangubai Kathiawadi; Amitabh Bhattacharya – "Apna Bana Le" – Bhediya; Amitabh Bhattacharya – "Tere Hawaale" – Laal Singh Chaddha; Shellee – "Maiyya Mainu" – Jersey
Best Playback Singer – Male		Best Playback Singer – Female
Arijit Singh – "Kesariya" – Brahmāstra: Part One – Shiva; Abhay Jodhpurkar – "Maange Manzooriyan" – Badhaai Do; Arijit Singh – "Apna Bana Le" – Bhediya; Arijit Singh – "Deva Deva" – Brahmāstra: Part One – Shiva; Sonu Nigam – "Main Ki Karaan?" – Laal Singh Chaddha		Kavita Seth – "Rangisari" – Jugjugg Jeeyo; Janhvi Shrimankar – "Dholida" – Gangubai Kathiawadi; Jonita Gandhi – "Deva Deva" – Brahmāstra: Part One – Shiva; Shilpa Rao – "Tere Hawaale" – Laal Singh Chaddha; Shreya Ghoshal – "Jab Saiyaan" – Gangubai Kathiawadi

=== Critics' awards ===
Best Film
Harshavardhan Kulkarni – Badhaai Do; Amar Kaushik – Bhediya; Jaspal Singh Sandhu and Rajeev Barnwal – Vadh; Nagraj Manjule – Jhund; R. Madhavan – Rocketry: The Nambi Effect
Best Actor	Best Actress
Sanjay Mishra – Vadh as Shambhunath Mishra; Amitabh Bachchan – Jhund as Vijay Borade; R. Madhavan – Rocketry: The Nambi Effect as Nambi Narayanan; Rajkummar Rao – Badhaai Do as Shradul Thakur; Shahid Kapoor – Jersey as Arjun Talwar; Varun Dhawan – Bhediya as Bhaskar Sharma	Bhumi Pednekar – Badhaai Do as Suman 'Sumi' Singh; Tabu – Bhool Bhulaiyaa 2 as Anjulika Chatterjee and Manjulika Chatterjee; Kajol – Salaam Venky as Kolavennu Sujata Krishnan; Neena Gupta – Vadh as Manju Mishra; Taapsee Pannu – Shabaash Mithu as Mithali Raj

=== Special awards ===
Filmfare Special Award

Filmfare Lifetime Achievement Award
- Prem Chopra
Filmfare R. D. Burman Award
- Janhvi Shrimankar for "Dholida" from Gangubai Kathiawadi

=== Technical awards ===
Nominations for the Technical awards were announced on 24 April 2023.

Best Editing	Best Production Design	Best Choreography
Ninad Khanolkar – An Action Hero; Amin Khatib – Bhool Bhulaiyaa 2; Sandeep Francis – Drishyam 2; Sankh Rajyadhyaksha – The Kashmir Files; Sanyukta Kaza – Bhediya	Subrata Chakraborty and Amit Ray – Gangubai Kathiawadi; Amrita Mahal Nakai – Brahmāstra: Part One – Shiva; Durga Prasad Mahapatra – Vikram Vedha; Mayur Sharma and Apurva Sondhi – Bhediya; Mustufa Satitionwala – Laal Singh Chaddha; Rajat Poddar – Bhool Bhulaiyaa 2	Kruti Mahesh – "Dholida" – Gangubai Kathiawadi; Bosco–Caesar – "Rangisari" – Jugjugg Jeeyo; Bosco–Caesar – "Title Track" – Bhool Bhulaiyaa 2; Ganesh Acharya – "Dance Ka Bhoot" – Brahmāstra: Part One – Shiva; Ganesh Acharya – "Thukeshwari" – Bhediya; Ganesh Hegde – "Alcoholia" – Vikram Vedha
Best Cinematography	Best Sound Design	Best Background Score
Sudeep Chatterjee – Gangubai Kathiawadi; Ewan Mulligan – Anek; Kaushal Shah – An Action Hero; P. S. Vinod – Vikram Vedha; Setu – Laal Singh Chaddha	Bishwadeep Deepak Chatterjee – Brahmāstra: Part One – Shiva; Kaamod L Kharde – Anek; Kunal Sharma – Bhediya; Leslie Fernandes – Vikram Vedha; Sanal George – Gangubai Kathiawadi	Sanchit Balhara and Ankit Balhara – Gangubai Kathiawadi; Mangesh Dhakde – Anek; Pritam, Jim Satya, Prasad S, Meghdeep Bose, Tanuj Tiku, Ketan Sodha, Sunny M.R. – Brahmāstra: Part One – Shiva; Sachin-Jigar – Bhediya; Sam CS – Vikram Vedha
Best Costume Design	Best Action	Best Special Effects
Sheetal Iqbal Sharma – Gangubai Kathiawadi; Maxima Basu – Laal Singh Chaddha; Pritanka Gayatri Dubey, Mahananda Sagaare and Veera Kapoor EE – Jhund; Rohit Chaturvedi – Badhaai Do; Sanjeev Rajsingh Parmar – Samrat Prithviraj	Parvez Shaikh – Vikram Vedha; Amin Khatib – Drishyam 2; Dan Bradley, Diyan Hristov and Parvez Shaikh – Brahmāstra: Part One – Shiva; Faruk Kabir and Yannick Ben – Khuda Haafiz: Chapter 2 – Agni Pariksha; Ram Chella, Lakshman Chella, Parvez Shaikh and Kecha Khamphakdee – Heropanti 2; Sea Young Oh, Parvez Shaikh, Hitz International Action Specialists – Dhaakad	Dneg, ReDefine – Brahmāstra: Part One – Shiva; Assemblage Entertainment PVT. – Rocketry: The Nambi Effect; Red Chillies VFX – Laal Singh Chaddha; Red Chillies VFX, After Studios – Bhool Bhulaiyaa 2

=== Short film awards ===
Best Short Film
Fiction	Non-fiction	People's Choice
Best Actor – Male (Short Film)		Best Actor – Female (Short Film)

== Superlatives ==
Multiple nominations
Nominations	Film
16	Gangubai Kathiawadi
14	Badhaai Do
14	Brahmāstra: Part One – Shiva
12	Bhediya
10	Bhool Bhulaiyaa 2
9	Laal Singh Chaddha
8	Vikram Vedha
7	The Kashmir Files
7	Uunchai
7	An Action Hero
6	Vadh
6	Jugjugg Jeeyo
6	Doctor G
5	Rocketry: The Nambi Effect
4	Jhund
4	Anek
3	Drishyam 2
2	Jersey

Multiple wins
Awards	Film
11	Gangubai Kathiawadi
6	Badhaai Do
5	Brahmāstra: Part One – Shiva
2	Jugjugg Jeeyo
2	Vadh

== See also ==
- Filmfare Awards
- List of Hindi films of 2022
