= SETU =

SETU may refer to:

== Acronyms ==
- South East Technological University, a technological university in the south east of Ireland
- Teniente Coronel Luis A. Mantilla International Airport, an airport in Tulcán, Ecuador, with the ICAO code SETU

== Places ==
Setu means bridge in Sanskrit and other Indian languages and may refer to the following bridges constructed in India:

=== Assam ===
- Dhola–Sadiya Bridge or Bhupen Hazarika Setu, between Assam and Arunachal Pradesh
- Kolia Bhomora Setu
- Naranarayan Setu

=== Bihar ===
- Arrah–Chhapra Bridge or Veer Kunwar Singh Setu
- Digha–Sonpur Bridge or J.P. Setu
- Mahatma Gandhi Setu
- Rajendra Setu
- Vikramshila Setu

=== Gujarat ===
- Morarji Desai Setu
- Sudama Setu

=== West Bengal ===
- Bijon Setu, Kolkata
- Farakka Setu
- Howrah Bridge or Rabindra Setu, Kolkata
- Ishwar Gupta Setu
- Jangalkanya Setu
- Joyee Setu
- Maitri Setu, between India and Bangladesh
- Matla Setu
- Netaji Subhas Chandra Bose Setu
- Vidyasagar Setu
- Vivekananda Setu, Kolkata
- Second Vivekananda Bridge or Second Vivekananda Setu, Kolkata
- Tala Bridge or Tala Setu, Kolkata

=== Others ===
- Adam's Bridge or Rama's Setu, chain of shoals off the coast of India and Sri Lanka, identified with the bridge in Ramayana
  - Sethusamudram Shipping Canal Project or Setu Samudram, proposed canal at the above
- Atal Setu, Goa
- Atal Setu, Jammu and Kashmir
- Atal Setu, Sikkim
- Bandra–Worli Sea Link or Rajiv Gandhi Setu, Mumbai
- Kaman Aman Setu, Jammu and Kashmir, between India and Pakistan
- Utkal Gourab Madhusudan Setu, Odisha

== Others ==
- Aarogya Setu, COVID-19 contact tracing mobile application in India
- Bijon Setu massacre, 1982 murder of monks and a nun in Kolkata, India
- Setu Bandha Sarvangasana, inverted back-bending posture in yoga
- Setu Bharatam, Indian highway project
- Setu coins, ancient coinage from India and Sri Lanka
- Sethu Lakshmi Bayi or Setu Lakshmi Bayi (r. 1924–1931), Indian queen, maharani of Travancore
- Setumadhavarao Pagadi or Setu Madhavrao Pagdi, Indian historian
- Rama Setu (Ramayana), a bridge built by Rama as described in the Ramayana
  - Sethubandhanam, another term for the above
- Setu, an Estonian dialect; see Seto dialect

== See also ==
- Sethu (disambiguation)
- Sethubandhanam (disambiguation)
- Sethupathi (disambiguation)
- Adams Bridge (disambiguation)
