= Vadh =

Vadh (lit. 'killing') may refer to:

- Vadh (2002 film), an Indian Hindi psychological thriller film directed by Raj Bharat
- Vadh (2022 film), an Indian Hindi-language crime thriller film directed by Jaspal Singh Sandhu
  - Vadh 2, 2026 sequel to the 2022 film by Sandhu
