= Sethubandhanam (disambiguation) =

Sethubandhanam is a bridge built by the Vanara army of Rama in the Ramayana.

Sethubandhanam may also refer to:

- Sethu Bandhanam (1937 film), 1937 Indian Tamil-language film
- Sethu Bandhanam (1946 film), Indian 1946 Telugu-language film
- Sethubandhanam (film), 1974 Indian Malayalam-language film by J. Sasikumar
- Sethubandhanam at Sreeraman Chira Chemmappilly, re-enactment of the scene from the Ramayana held annually in Kerala, India

== See also ==
- Ram Setu (film), 2022 Indian drama film
- Adams Bridge (disambiguation)
- Sethu (disambiguation)
- SETU (disambiguation)
- Sethupathi (disambiguation)
