= Dating The Era of Lord Ram =

Indian history book

- Author: Pushkar Bhatnagar
- Language: English
- Genre: History
- Publisher: Rupa Publications
- Publication date: 2004
- Publication place: India
- English publication date: 2004
- Media type: Paperback and Ebook
- Pages: 172
- ISBN: 978-8129104984
- OCLC: 500035996

Dating the Era of Lord Ram is an English-language book published in 2004 by Rupa & Co, written by Pushkar Bhatnagar. The book is about the life of Rama (also spelt "Ram"), a deity in Hinduism.

== Content ==
According to Valmiki, when Rama was born, the sun was in Aries, the moon was in Cancer, Jupiter and the moon were both in Libra, Venus was in Pisces, and Mars was in Capricorn. Additionally, it was the ninth day of the moon's ascending phase in the lunar month of Chaitra. With the use of a powerful piece of software, the two slides on the book's cover show that on January 10, 5114 B.C., these particular astral conditions were present in the sky. This book uses Western scientific progress to demonstrate how old the East is.

== Controversy ==
Historians had questioned and asked for evidence to prove the existence of "Lord Ram". A professor of Allahabad University, R. P. Tripathi, said historical characters need solid evidence to justify the myths, and the former chairman of the Indian Council of Historical Research, S Setter, said that there is no such evidence that can prove the existence of Rama, asserting that "Lord Ram is myth".

== In art and culture ==
The makers of the 2022 film Ram Setu make mentions of the book.
