= Chalo Jeete Hain =

- Film poster
- Directed by: Mangesh Hadawale
- Written by: Mangesh Hadawale
- Produced by: Mahaveer Jain, Bhushan Kumar
- Starring: Dhairya Darji, Dipati Avlan
- Cinematography: Rishi Punjabi
- Edited by: Sanjay Ingle
- Music by: Shail-Pritesh
- Production company: T-Series (company)
- Release date: July 11, 2018
- Running time: 32 minutes
- Country: India
- Language: Hindi

Chalo Jeete Hain (lit. 'Come let's live') is a 2018 Indian short film directed by Mangesh Hadawale produced by Hadawale, Mahaveer Jain, Bhushan Kumar. The short film is based on the early life of prime minister of India, Tagline "Modi Ka Bachapan" Narendra Modi.

== Plot ==
The short Docufilm film is about a boy, called Narendra or Naru, in post-independence Vadnagar.The impressionable boy is deeply traumatized by Swami Vivekananda's quote, "Vahi jeete hain, jo dusaro ke liye jeete hain" (translation: "Only those who live for others, actually live"). In search of purpose in life, he tries to pursue what he can do for others in his small world. It is a biopic short film, inspired by the early life of Prime Minister of India Shri Narendra Modi Sir. Modi's childhood

== Cast ==
- Dhairya Darji as Naru
- Dev Modi as Harish
- Dipti Avlan as Hiraben
- Rajeev Saxena as Damodar
- Ajay Kumar as Guruji
- Lata S.Singh as Kamla

== Special Screening ==
The film was screened at Rashtrapati Bhavan on 24 July 2018 where President Ram Nath Kovind watched it along with Union Ministers Piyush Goyal, Dharmendra Pradhan, Mahesh Sharma, MJ Akbar, Rajyavardhan Rathore, The Hindu reported. and was screened at Parliament's Balayogi Auditorium on 25 July 2018 before its world premiere on Star Network and Hotstar over the weekend. the film “indirectly captures some aspects of the India Prime Minister Narendra Modi's childhood. It sends a powerful, emotional message in a short time.” The source said the film also features references to freedom fighters Bhagat Singh, Rajguru, and Sukhdev who lived for others.

== See also ==
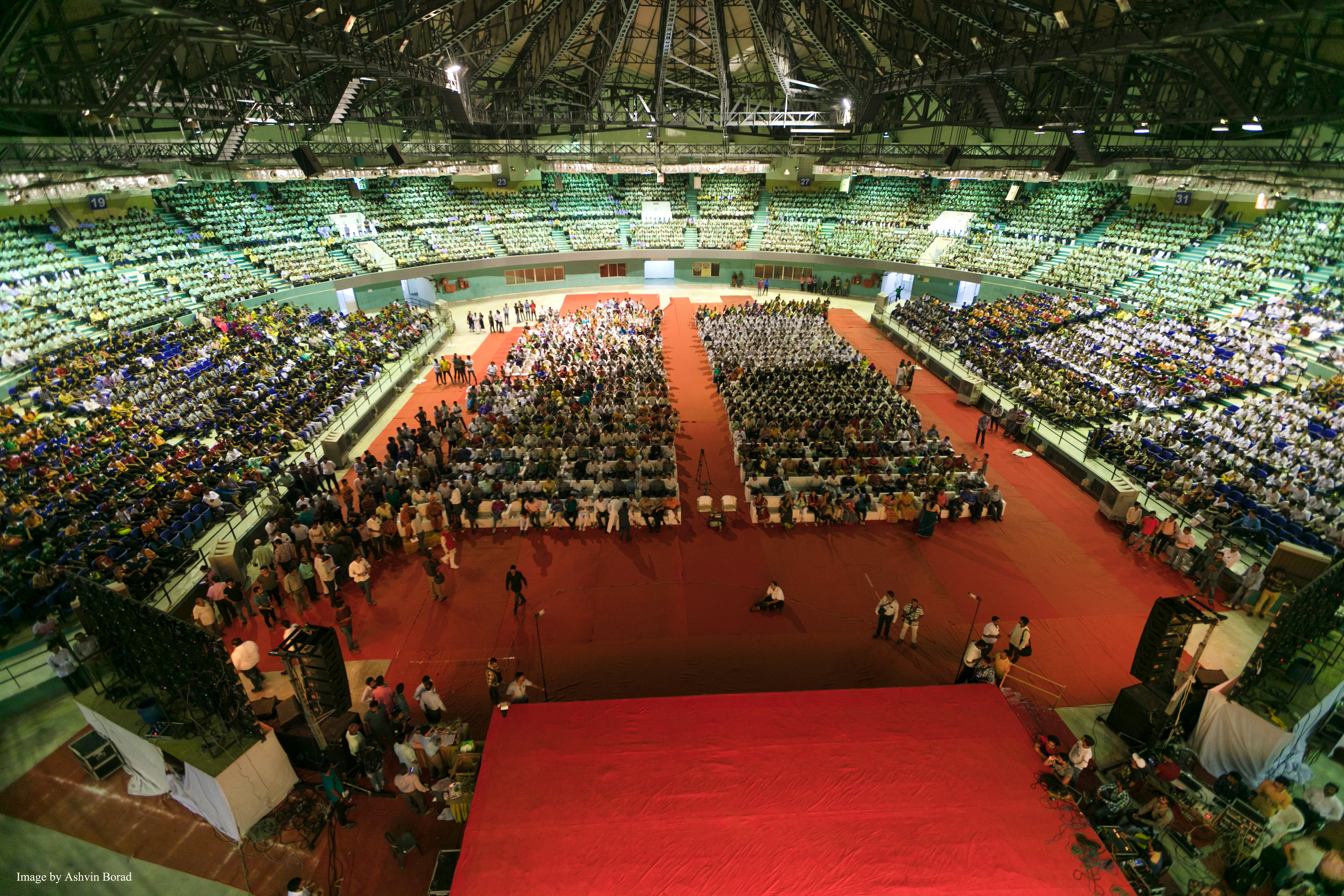
Promotion Event Photograph by Ashvin Borad

Member of Parliament C.R. Patil & M.L.A Harsh Sanghvi, Smriti Irani and entrepreneur Sanjay Movaliya in the presence of this film was promoted in front of 5000 people in Indoor Stadium Surat.Indoor Stadium Capacity of 7000 people seating. Photography of the promotion event was done by Ashvin Borad.

== Release ==
The film will have its world premiere on Star Network and its OTT platform Hotstar on 29 July 2018. This film Initial released 11 July 2018.

== Awards and nominations ==
Chalo Jeete Hain, a short film inspired by incidents from Prime Minister Narendra Modi's childhood, won the National Film Award for Best Non-Feature Film on Family Welfare at the 66th National Film Awards, announced in 2019.
