= Sethu =

Sethu may refer to:

== People ==
- Sethu (actor), Indian film actor and producer
- Sethu (writer) (born 1942), Indian writer
- Sethu (singer), Italian singer and rapper
- Sethu Eyyal, Indian film director
- Sethu Lakshmi, Indian actress
- Sethu Lakshmi Bayi (r. 1924–1931), Indian queen, maharani of Travancore
- Sethu Parvathi Bayi, queen-mother of Travancore
- Sethu Sriram, Indian cinematographer
- Sethu Vijayakumar, British-Indian academic
- Sethu Vinayagam, Indian stage and film actor
- Varada Sethu, British-Indian actress
- V. Sethuraman or Sethu, Indian dermatologist and actor
- Sethu of Sachi-Sethu, Indian screenwriter duo in Malayalam cinema
- Yugi Sethu, Indian actor
- K. S. Sethumadhavan or K.S. Sethu Madhavan (1931–2021), Indian film director
- Setumadhavarao Pagadi or Sethu Madhav Rao Pagadi, Indian historian

== Places and geography ==
- Sethu Express, Indian train route between Chennai and Rameswaram, to the Rama Sethu
- Sethu Institute of Technology, technical institute in Madurai, Tamil Nadu, India

== Others ==
- Sethu (film), 1999 Indian Tamil-language film
- Sethu Boomi, 2016 Indian film
- Setu coins or Sethu coins, ancient coinage from India and Sri Lanka
- Sethu FC, Indian women's football club based in Madurai, Tamil Nadu
- Sethupathi, Indian rulers, considered protectors of Rama Sethu/Adam's Bridge
- Assault Sethu, fictional gangster in the 2014 Indian film Jigarthanda

== See also ==
- Sethubandhanam (disambiguation)
- Sethupathi (disambiguation)
- SETU (disambiguation)
