= Neena Gupta =

Indian actress (born 1959)

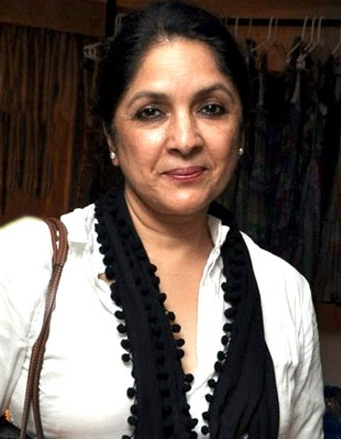
- Gupta in 2015
- Born: 4 June 1959 (age 67); Calcutta, West Bengal, India
- Education: University of Delhi (BA, MA, MPhil); National School of Drama
- Occupations: Actress; television director
- Years active: 1982–present
- Spouses: Amlan Kusum Ghose (m. 1977; div. 1978) Vivek Mehra (m. 2008)
- Children: Masaba Gupta

Neena Gupta (born 4 June 1959) is an Indian actress and television director who works in Hindi films and other language films alongside TV series. Gupta has received several awards including three National Film Awards, a Filmfare Award and two Filmfare OTT Awards.

Known for her work in both art-house and commercial films, she won the National Film Award for Best Supporting Actress for playing a young widow in Woh Chokri (1994) and for Uunchai (2022). In 2018, she saw career resurgence for starring as a middle-aged pregnant woman in the comedy-drama Badhaai Ho, for which she won the Filmfare Award for Best Actress (Critics) and received a nomination for the Filmfare Award for Best Actress.

Gupta's television appearances include a leading role in the drama series Saans (1999) and as the host of the television quiz show Kamzor Kadii Kaun, the Indian version of The Weakest Link. In June 2021, publisher Penguin Random House India released her autobiography Sach Kahun Toh.

== Early life and education ==
Neena Gupta was born on 4 June 1959 in Kolkata, India to R. N. Gupta, an LLB-graduate and an officer in the State Trading Corporation of India, and Shakuntala Devi Gupta (née Kinra) a former teacher with double masters degrees in Sanskrit and political science.

She grew up in the Karol Bagh area of New Delhi, doing her elementary schooling at the Bal Bharti School and secondary schooling at Vidya Bhawan. She went on to get her Bachelor of Arts from Janki Devi Memorial College of Delhi University, and her Master of Arts in Sanskrit, also from Delhi University. She also earned an MPhil from the same university for her thesis on 'Stage Techniques in Sanskrit Drama: Theory and Practice'. Midway through her PhD in Sanskrit, she gave up her research due to difference of opinion between her guide and her.

She was active in the theatre scene while at university, forming a close friendship with fellow actor-director Satish Kaushik, who encouraged her to follow his lead and join the National School of Drama. Gupta enrolled at NSD in 1977, studying under the tutelage of such greats as Ebrahim Alkazi and B.V. Karanth and graduated top of her class in 1980. Her contemporaries at the institute include Alok Nath and Annu Kapoor.

== Career ==
=== Film career ===
Gupta has made appearances in several international films, such as Gandhi (1982), in which she played the niece of Mahatma Gandhi, and Merchant Ivory films, The Deceivers (1988), Mirza Ghalib (1989), In Custody (1993), and Cotton Mary (1999). She also made an impression in Indian parallel cinema such as Mandi (1983), Rihaee (1988), Drishti (1990) and Suraj Ka Satvan Ghoda (1992). These performances further established her profile in Indian movies alongside her arthouse film contemporaries Rekha, Shabana Azmi, Smita Patil and Dimple Kapadia. Despite this, Gupta never had a major commercial hit and found it difficult to find more dramatic roles:

I made a few mistakes in the beginning of my career. I didn't have anybody to guide me. I didn't have a secretary. I didn't call up directors, or meet people asking for roles. Also, because of the media, there is a perception that I am a strong woman. Unfortunately, in our society, that goes against you. So, I got negative, vampish roles only. Plain and simple female roles never come my way because of my image, which is very wrong. My personal life got typecast into my professional life.

Her appearance in Hindi movies was especially noted in the satirical movie, Jaane Bhi Do Yaaro in which she played the role of a secretary to Pankaj Kapoor. She also starred along with Madhuri Dixit in Khalnayak (1993); she was featured in the popular song "Choli Ke Peeche" in the movie.

Gupta starred in several television films, including Lajwanti (1993) and Bazar Sitaram (1993), the latter of which won her the National Film Award for Best First Non-Feature Film of a Director. The following year, she achieved her breakthrough as a newly widowed daughter-in-law in the acclaimed drama Woh Chokri (1994), which won her the National Film Award for Best Supporting Actress.

==== Career resurgence (2017–present) ====
In 2017, Gupta made headlines when she shared a post on Instagram asking for work: "I live in Mumbai and working as a good actor looking for good parts to play." Fed up with the lack of roles being written for middle-aged women in Bollywood, Gupta later reflected, "After that Instagram post, I got many offers -- five, in fact, and I accepted all of them. There is no shame in saying you don't have work."

One of the offers she accepted was Amit Sharma's comedy-drama Badhaai Ho (2018), in which she starred alongside Gajraj Rao, Ayushmann Khurrana and Sanya Malhotra. The film, which told the story of a middle-aged couple who get pregnant, much to the disappointment of their children, saw her play a middle-aged pregnant mother, It received widespread critical acclaim upon release, with various critics and publications citing Gupta's performance as the film's highlight and one of the best of her career. Film critic Rajeev Masand credited Gupta for bringing "real empathy" to the part, while Saibal Chatterjee of NDTV described her portrayal as "outstandingly measured." For her performance, she received several accolades including the Filmfare Award for Best Actress (Critics), the Screen Award for Best Actress (Critics), and the BFJA Award for Best Supporting Actress (Hindi). At 60, she became the second-eldest Best Actress nominee in Filmfare Award history after Sharmila Tagore. Badhaai Ho also emerged as a major commercial success at the box-office, grossing over ₹221.44 crore (US$32.38 million) worldwide, thus ranking as the ninth-highest-grossing Hindi film of the year.

In 2020, Gupta appeared in Ashwiny Iyer Tiwari's sports comedy-drama Panga, and reunited with Khurana for the social romantic comedy-drama Shubh Mangal Zyada Saavdhan, earning positive reviews for her performance in both films, earning her first nomination for the Filmfare Award for Best Supporting Actress. Gupta appeared alongside Manoj Bajpayee and Sakshi Tanwar in the thriller Dial 100.

In 2021, Gupta starred in the black comedy-drama Sandeep Aur Pinky Faraar alongside Parineeti Chopra, Arjun Kapoor, Jaideep Ahlawat and Raghubir Yadav, as the wife of Yadav's character. Her performance, and the film, received critical acclaim and earned her a second consecutive nomination for the Filmfare Award for Best Supporting Actress.

=== Television career ===
Her big break on television came with Khandan (1985), Yatra (1986), Gulzar's Mirza Ghalib (1987), a TV miniseries, followed by Shyam Benegal's Bharat Ek Khoj (1988) and later Dard (1994), Gumraah (1995), Shrimaan Shrimati (1995), Saans, Saat Phere – Saloni Ka Safar (2005), Chitthi (2003), Meri Biwi Ka Jawab Nahin (2004). She has also acted in the TV serial, Buniyaad.

She also hosted the Indian version of the TV series The Weakest Link, Kamzor Kadii Kaun and appeared in Jassi Jaissi Koi Nahin which gave her considerable popularity.

She has directed successful TV series, such as Saans (1999), Siski in (2000), Guns and Roses (2004) and Kyun Hota Hai Pyarrr. She played the role of Shubha, one of the four women main leads in Ladies Special, a daily soap on Sony TV. She was seen in Dil Se Diya Vachan as a doctor by profession and mother-in-law of the lead character Nandani which aired on Zee TV.

She also ran a theatre production company, 'Sahaj Productions' with actor, Rajendra Gupta, and acted as well as produced the Hindi play Soorya Ki Antim Kiran Se Soorya Ki Paheli Kiran Tak. She has also had some roles in Rishtey which was aired on Zee TV during 1999–2000.

She portrays the role of Manju Devi opposite Raghubir Yadav in Amazon Prime's Panchayat.

She has also been a part of Masaba Masaba, a Netflix show based on her and her daughter Masaba Gupta, who is a designer by profession.

== Personal life ==
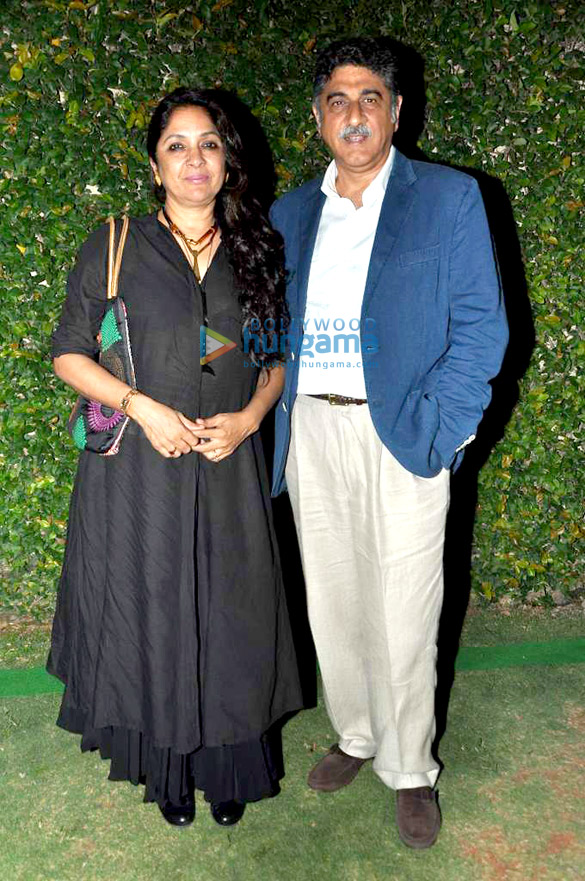
Neena Gupta and Vivek Mehra in 2013

Gupta married Amlan Kusum Ghose, studying at IIT Delhi, while still a bachelor's student. The marriage was short-lived with both mutually and amicably deciding to part ways within a year. She was briefly engaged to Shaarangdev Pandit, the son of Pandit Jasraj. She was in a relationship with former West Indies cricketer Viv Richards in the late 1980s. Though they never married, they have a daughter named Masaba Gupta born in 1989. Since Richards was already married, Gupta decided to raise Masaba on her own as a single mother. In 2008, Gupta married New Delhi–based chartered accountant Vivek Mehra in a private ceremony in the United States.

== Filmography ==
Key
†	Denotes films that have not yet been released

=== Films ===
Year	Film	Role	Notes
1982	Saath Saath	Neena	
1982	Aadat Se Majboor		
1982	Gandhi	Abha	
1982	Yeh Nazdeekiyan	Neena	
1982	Jaipur Junction		
1982	Aadharshila		
1983	Jaane Bhi Do Yaaron	Priya	
1983	Mandi	Vasanti	
1984	Utsav	Madanika	
1984	Laila	Salma	
1985	Agnidaah	Sunita	
1985	Trikaal	Milagrenia	
1987	Taniya		
1987	Susman	Mandira	
1988	Rihaee	Sukhi	
1988	The Deceivers	Gopal's Wife	
1989	Batwara	Devan's wife	
1990	Kaarnama	Vyjayanti	
1990	Swarg	Naina	
1990	Drishti	Revati	
1991	Aadhi Mimansa		Odia /Hindi Film
1991	Vasthuhara	Damayanthi	Malayalam film
1992	Aham	Mother Nobble	Malayalam film
1992	Zulm Ki Hukumat	Yeshwant's wife	
1992	Ghar Jamai	Neena Sharma	
1992	Balwaan	Ratna	
1992	Suraj Ka Satvan Ghoda	Satti	
1992	Yalgaar	Kaushalya Kumar	
1992	Angaar	Majid's Wife	(uncredited)
1992	Kal Ki Awaz	Mrs. Fahmida Nooruddin Ahmed	
1993	Khalnayak	Champa Didi	
1993	Veerta	Uma	
1993	Apaatkaal	Mrs. Mungeri Lal	
1993	Phir Teri Kahani Yaad Aayee	Street Singer	(in song "Shayarana Si Hai Zindagi")
1993	Bhagavad Gita	Draupadi	
1993	Aankhen	Chief minister's wife	(uncredited)
1994	Woh Chokri	Geeta Devi	
1994	Jazbaat	Maya	
1994	Eena Meena Deeka		
1994	Sone Ki Sita		
1994	Anth	Mrs. Vikas Saxena	
1994	In Custody	Sarla	
1995	Nazar		
1995	Dushmani: A Violent Love Story		
1997	Uff! Yeh Mohabbat	Billo	
1997	Jeeo Shaan Se		
1999	Cotton Mary	Blossom (Mary's sister)	
2002	Raat Ke Saudagar		
2004	Meri Biwi Ka Jawaab Nahin	Savitri	
2005	Nazar	as Jogan	
2009	Teree Sang	Paaki M. Puri	
2009	The White Elephant		
2009	Kitani Mohabbat hai	Savita Punj	
2010	Veer	Mangla	
2010	Hello Zindagi		
2010	Na Ghar Ke Na Ghaat Ke	Mrs. S. Tripathi	
2010	Chhevan Dariya (The Sixth River)	Gurjeet Kaur	
2012	Mere Dost Picture Abhi Baaki Hai	as Mymmyji	
2013	Issaq	as Amma	
2015	Alone	as Sanjana's Mother	
2015	The Threshold	Rinku	
2018	Veere Di Wedding	Mrs. Sharma	
2018	Mulk	Tabassum	
2018	Badhaai Ho	Priyamvada Kaushik	
2019	Music Teacher	Madhavi	Netflix film
2019	The Last Color	Noor	
2020	Panga	Jaya's mother	
2020	Shubh Mangal Zyada Saavdhan	Sunaina Tripathi	
2021	Sandeep Aur Pinky Faraar	Aunty	
2021	Sardar Ka Grandson	Sardar Kaur	Netflix film
2021	Chhatrasal	Narrator	
2021	Dial 100	Seema Pallav	ZEE5 film
2021	83	Raj Kumari Nikhanj	Cameo appearance
2022	Goodbye	Gayatri Bhalla	
2022	Uunchai	Shabina Siddiqui	
2022	Vadh	Manju Mishra	
2023	Shiv Shastri Balboa	Elsa	
2023	Mrs. Chatterjee vs Norway	Vasudha Kamat	
2023	Lust Stories 2	Dadi	Netflix Anthology film
2023	Ishq-e-Nadaan	Charulata	
2023	Mast Mein Rehne Ka	Mrs. Handa	Prime Video film
2024	Kaagaz 2	Sushma	
2025	Dil Dosti Aur Dogs	Laurence Bethany Margaret	
2025	Aachari Baa	Jaishnaviben Anopchand Vagadia	
2025	Metro... In Dino	Shibani	
2025	Tu Meri Main Tera Main Tera Tu Meri	Pinky Mehra	
2026	Vadh 2	Manju Mishra	

=== Television ===
Year	Title	Role	language	Notes	Ref.
1985	Khandaan		Hindi		
1986	Yatra		Hindi		
1987	Gul Gulshan Gulfaam		Hindi		
1988	Mirza Ghalib	Nawab Jaan	Hindi		
1989	Dard		Hindi	Also Director	
1989	Daddy	Vimla	Hindi	Television film	
1989	Chanakya	Shweta	Hindi		
1994	Junoon	Reema	Hindi		
1994–1995	Daane Anaar Ke	Roop Bala Musaddilal	Hindi		
1998–1999	Saans	Priya Kapoor	Hindi	Also writer and director	
1999	Pal Chhin	—N/a	Hindi	Director	
2000	Siski	Anoushka Saxena	Hindi	Also director	
2000–2004	Son Pari	—N/a	Hindi	Producer	
2001–2002	Kamzor Kadii Kaun	Host	Hindi		
2002	Saanjhi	Kanak	Hindi	Also writer	
2002–2004	Kyun Hota Hai Pyarrr	—N/a	Hindi	Producer	
2004	Jassi Jaissi Koi Nahin	Nandini	Hindi		
2005–2009	Saat Phere – Saloni Ka Safar	Manorama "Manno" Narendra Singh	Hindi		
2009	Ladies Special	Shubha Joshi	Hindi		
2010–2011	Dil Se Diya Vachan	Dr. Kalyani Rajadhyaksha	Hindi		
2018	Kehne Ko Humsafar Hain	—N/a	Hindi	Writer	
2019	Made in Heaven	Veenu Roshan	Hindi	Guest	
2020–present	Panchayat	Manju Devi	Hindi		
2020	PariWar	Kadambari	Hindi	Hotstar series	
2020–2022	Masaba Masaba	As herself	Hindi	Netflix series	
2023	Charlie Chopra	Janki	Hindi	SonyLIV series	
2024	1000 Babies	Sara Ouseph	Malayalam	Hotstar series	
2026	Chumbak	Rajni Merchant	Hindi	Netflix series	

== Awards and nominations ==
Year	Work	Award	Category	Result	Ref.
1993	Bazar Sitaram	National Film Awards	Best First Non-Feature Film of a Director	Won	
1994	Woh Chokri	National Film Awards	Best Supporting Actress	Won	
1999	Saans	Screen Awards	Best Actress (Television)	Won	
2019	Mulk	International Indian Film Academy Awards	Best Supporting Actress	Nominated	
2019	Badhaai Ho	International Indian Film Academy Awards	Best Actress	Nominated	
2019	Badhaai Ho	Screen Awards	Best Actress (Critics)	Won	
2019	Badhaai Ho	Lions Gold Awards	Best Actor (Female)	Won	
2019	Badhaai Ho	Zee Cine Awards	Best Actress (Critics)	Nominated	
2019	Badhaai Ho	Zee Cine Awards	Extraordinary Couple of the Year (shared with Gajraj Rao)	Won	
2019	Badhaai Ho	Filmfare Awards	Best Actress	Nominated	
2019	Badhaai Ho	Filmfare Awards	Best Actress (Critics)	Won	
2020	Panchayat (Season 1)	Filmfare OTT Awards	Best Supporting Actress in a Comedy Series	Won	
2021	Masaba Masaba	Filmfare OTT Awards	Best Supporting Actress in a Comedy Series	Nominated	
2021	Shubh Mangal Zyada Saavdhan	Filmfare Awards	Best Supporting Actress	Nominated	
2022	Sandeep Aur Pinky Faraar	Filmfare Awards	Best Supporting Actress	Nominated	
2022	Panchayat (Season 2)	Filmfare OTT Awards	Best Supporting Actress in a Comedy Series	Won	
2023	Vadh	Filmfare Awards	Best Actress (Critics)	Nominated	
2024	Uunchai	National Film Awards	Best Supporting Actress	Won	
