= Saans =

- Genre: Drama
- Written by: Neena Gupta
- Directed by: Neena Gupta
- Starring: See below
- Theme music composer: Lalit Sen
- Opening theme: "Saans" by Hariharan
- Country of origin: India
- Original language: Hindi
- No. of seasons: 1
- No. of episodes: 179

Production
- Camera setup: Multi-camera
- Running time: Approx. 24 minutes

Original release
- Network: Star Plus
- Release: 1998 – 2001

Saans (English: Breath) is an Indian television series written and directed by actress Neena Gupta who works in the series as well alongside television actor Kanwaljit Singh. The series premiered on Star Plus in 1998. The story focused on the accidental love triangle between the characters Priya, Gautam, and Manisha. Neena Gupta won the award for 'Best Director' and Kanwaljit Singh won for the 'Best Actor' categories at the Kalakar Awards 1998.

== Plot ==
The story revolved around Priya and Gautam, who were a happily married couple with two children, Akul and Mithi. Everything went wrong when Priya and Gautam became friends with Manisha. Manisha falls in love with Gautam, then Manisha and Gautam have an affair. When Priya finds out, it is up to Priya to get her husband back in line.

== Cast and characters ==
- Neena Gupta as Priya Gautam Kapoor
- Kanwaljit Singh as Gautam Kapoor
- Kavita Kapoor as Manisha
- Shagufta Ali as Shakuntala Suri
- Ashok Lokhande as Mr. Suri
- Sushmita Daan as Mithi Kapoor
- Bharti Jaffrey as Priya's Mother
- Bharat Kapoor as Ajit
- Neelima Azeem as Ajit's Estranged Wife
- Rakesh Pandey as Gautam's Father
- Asha Sharma as Mr. Suri's Mother
- Neelam Singh as Neelam Dhawan
- Akul Tripathi as Akul Kapoor
- Jatin Sial as Jatin Kapoor

== Production ==
Initially, Director Neena Gupta offered Saans for Zee TV. However, when they rejected the series, Star Plus accepted it.

== Reception ==
The show initially received mixed reviews from critics. The Tribune quoted the series as 'A breath of fresh air'. Within an year of its launch, it gained popularity and featured among Hindi serials with highest viewership.

== Re-release ==
The show was re-released on Tata Sky Classic TV in 2021 and it currently airs on the platform.
