= Uunchai =

2022 Indian film by Sooraj Barjatya

- Theatrical release poster
- Directed by: Sooraj R. Barjatya
- Written by: Abhishek Dixit
- Story by: Sunil Gandhi
- Produced by: Kamal Kumar Barjatya; Mahaveer Jain; Late Rajkumar Barjatya; Natasha Malpani Oswal; Ajit Kumar Barjatya
- Starring: Amitabh Bachchan; Anupam Kher; Boman Irani; Parineeti Chopra; Neena Gupta; Sarika
- Cinematography: Manoj Kumar Khatoi
- Edited by: Shweta Venkat Matthew
- Music by: Score: George Joseph; Songs: Amit Trivedi
- Production companies: Rajshri Productions; Mahaveer Jain Films; Boundless Media
- Distributed by: PVR Pictures (India); Yash Raj Films (International)
- Release date: 11 November 2022
- Running time: 170 minutes
- Country: India
- Language: Hindi
- Box office: est. ₹48.99 crore

Uunchai (transl. Altitude) is a 2022 Indian Hindi-language adventure drama film directed by Sooraj Barjatya, written by Abhishek Dixit on the basis of an original story by Sunil Gandhi, and produced jointly by Rajshri Productions, Boundless Media and Mahaveer Jain Films. The 60th film produced by Rajshri, stars an ensemble cast of Amitabh Bachchan, Anupam Kher, Boman Irani, Parineeti Chopra, Neena Gupta and Sarika with Danny Denzongpa and Nafisa Ali in guest appearances.

Uunchai was announced in October 2021. The principal photography commenced in October 2021 itself and ended in April 2022, followed by post-production work. The film's music is composed by Amit Trivedi.

Uunchai was theatrically released on 11 November 2022. The film earned ₹48.99 crore worldwide. The film was digitally released on the OTT platform, ZEE5 on 6 January 2023.

At the 68th Filmfare Awards, Uunchai received 7 nominations, including Best Film, Best Director (Barjatya), Best Actor (Bachchan) and Best Supporting Actor (Kher). At the 70th National Film Awards, the film won the Best Direction (Barjatya) and Best Supporting Actress (Gupta).

== Plot ==
Three aged friends — Amit, Om and Javed — take a trek to the Everest Base Camp, to fulfil their fourth friend Bhupen's last wish. They're joined by Mala along the way, who happens to be the long lost love of Bhupen and regrets not having fought for their love. A simple trek turns out to be a personal, emotional and spiritual journey as they battle their physical limitations and discover the true meaning of freedom.

== Cast ==
- Amitabh Bachchan as Amit Srivastava
- Anupam Kher as Om Sharma (Omi)
- Boman Irani as Javed Siddiqui
- Sarika as Mala Trivedi
- Neena Gupta as Shabina Siddiqui
- Parineeti Chopra as Shraddha Gupta
- Sheen Dass as Heeba Siddiqui
- Abhishek Singh Pathania as Valli
- Pranav Sachdev as Siddharth Sharma, Om's son
- Raju Kher as Gagan "Guddu" Sharma, Om's brother

Cameo appearances

- Danny Denzongpa as Bhupen
- Nafisa Ali as Abhilasha Srivastava

== Production ==
=== Development ===
It was announced in October 2021 that Sooraj Barjatya would be making his comeback to direction with Uunchai since Prem Ratan Dhan Payo (2015). A family drama like all Rajshri films which revolves around the friendship of senior citizens, Uunchai is jointly produced by Rajshri Productions, Boundless Media, and Mahaveer Jain Films.

=== Casting ===
It was announced in September 2021 that Amitabh Bachchan, Anupam Kher, Boman Irani and Danny Denzongpa will play the lead roles of four friends, with Neena Gupta. Sarika marks her comeback to cinema with this film since Baar Baar Dekho (2016). In October 2021, Parineeti Chopra was roped in as a tourist guide. Nafisa Ali was cast opposite Bachchan. Television actors Sheen Dass and Abhishek Singh Pathania made their Bollywood debut with this film.

=== Filming ===
Filming began in October 2021, with Parineeti Chopra, Anupam Kher, and Boman Irani. Amitabh Bachchan joined the cast in December 2021. The film has been shot at various locations in Nepal including at Lukla and Kathmandu.

It has also been shot at Kargil, Delhi, Mumbai and Uttar Pradesh. In March 2022, Chopra finished shooting for her part in the film. The rest of the cast completed their shoot and the filming ended in April 2022.

== Soundtrack ==
Uunchai

Soundtrack album by Amit Trivedi
- Released: 28 October 2022
- Recorded: 2021–2022
- Genre: Feature film soundtrack
- Length: 26:36
- Language: Hindi
- Label: Zee Music Company

Amit Trivedi chronology
Doctor G (2022)	Uunchai (2022)	Rocket Gang (2022)
External audio
- Uunchai - Full Album on YouTube

The songs are composed by Amit Trivedi. The lyrics are written by Irshad Kamil. The film score is composed by George Joseph.

Track listing
No.	Title	Singer(s)	Length
1.	"Keti Ko"	Nakash Aziz	3:50
2.	"Arre Oh Uncle"	Divya Kumar, Devender Pal Singh	3:13
3.	"Haan Kar De"	Amit Trivedi	4:05
4.	"Ladki Pahadi"	Abhijeet Srivastava	4:35
5.	"Savera"	Javed Ali, Deepali Sathe, Madhubanti Bagchi	3:54
6.	"Ladki Pahadi" (Bonus Version)	Abhijeet Srivastava	2:25
7.	"Ladki Pahadi" (Mohit Chauhan Version)	Mohit Chauhan	4:35
Total length:			26:36

== Marketing ==
First look posters of the star ensemble was released by their friends from the industry. Amitabh Bachchan's poster was released by Dharmendra, Anupam Kher's by Anil Kapoor, Boman Irani's by Rajkumar Hirani, Sarika's by Kirron Kher, Neena Gupta's by Gajraj Rao and Parineeti Chopra's by Arjun Kapoor.

Uunchai's final poster was released on 17 October 2022, a day prior to trailer launch. The trailer was released on 18 October 2022.

=== Home media ===
The digital distribution rights of the film were acquired by ZEE5. The film started streaming digitally on ZEE5 from 6 January 2023.

== Release ==
Uunchai is the 60th film under Rajshri Productions. It was theatrical released on 11 November 2022. All India distribution by Anand Motion Pictures and PVR Pictures and International distribution by Yash Raj Films through White Hill Studios.

== Reception ==
=== Box office ===
Uunchai competed with Rocket Gang, which was released on the same day and emerged victorious. The film collected ₹1.81 crore at the domestic box office on its opening day. On its second day, it showed 50% growth and collected ₹3.64 crore. On the third day, it minted ₹4.71 crore. The film grossed ₹17.02 crore, by the end of first week. The film grossed total of ₹40.71 crore in India and ₹8.28 crore overseas for a total worldwide collection of ₹48.99 crore.

=== Critical response ===
On the review aggregator website Rotten Tomatoes, 27% of 11 critics' reviews are positive, with an average rating of 4.8/10.

A critic for Bollywood Hungama gave the film 3.5 stars out of 5 and wrote, "Uunchai is a simple, emotional, family film with top-notch performances by the lead cast. However, the film suffers due to mediocre music and excessive length." Devesh Sharma of Filmfare gave the film 3.5 stars out of 5 and wrote, "It’s brave of Sooraj Barjatya to take senior actors and weave an ode to friendship around them. He tells a tale which unfolds at its own pace and will surely appeal to your heart." Himesh Mankad of Pinkvilla gave the film 3.5 stars out of 5 and wrote, "Uunchai is a well-made film. The emotions are relatable and the journey is motivating. Some trimming is needed in the second half, but it’s a heart-warming watch." Sonil Dedhia of News18 gave the film 3.5 stars out of 5 and wrote, "The beauty of the film is that none of its pitfalls eventually matter. It wins you over with its innocence and simplicity. Uunchai is uneven but heartfelt. Despite its flaws, the emotions connect."

Renuka Vyavahare of Times of India gave the film 3.5 stars out of 5 and wrote, "It’s the performances that keep you interested despite a messy latter half. We wish the writing was stronger and did more justice to the fabulous cast." Shalini Langer of The Indian Express gave the film 3 stars out of 5 and wrote, "A bit fewer of several stretches towards the second half where the film meanders into more than one man-made crises, and this Uunchai would have been mission truly accomplished." Shubham Kulkarni of Koimoi gave the film 3 stars out of 5 and wrote, "Uunchai is made with a lot of heart and nostalgia involved. Watch it with no expectations and with the thought that it is a filmmaker who wants to talk about love and its purity."

Monika Rawal Kukreja of Hindustan Times wrote, "Uunchai is a heart-warming story without any intent of being preachy or trying to evoke extreme emotions. Beautiful characters and beautifully written story, makes Uunchai worth it." Anuj Kumar of The Hindu wrote, "Uunchai tells a well-written, emotional story unhurriedly with relatable moments, making one chuckle and cry in equal parts. The length of the film takes away some of the bite." Pratikshya Mishra of The Quint wrote, "Uunchai has a strong emotional core but it lacks strength in brevity. The film’s runtime could’ve been cut down. When it comes to performances, every actor on screen, are masters of their craft."

Anindita Mukherjee of India Today gave the film 2.5 stars out of 5 and wrote, "Uunchai is all about feelings, love and emotions. One of the few things that could have been mended was the length of the film. We also wished to see more of Parineeti, Neena and Sarika." Deepa Gahlot of Scroll wrote, "For the armchair mountaineer, Uunchai, is a delight. If the over-long film is bearable, it because the actors make their characters endearing. Uunchai could have been entertaining if it wasn’t so sanctimonious." Sukanya Verma of Rediff.com gave the film 2 stars out of 5 and wrote, "Uunchai forcibly draws out our emotions by playing up the octogenarian actor's ordeal in a drama whose focus fluctuates between friendship, trekking, ageing, closures and making peace. The upshot is needless delay." Anna M.M. Vetticad of Firstpost gave the film 1 stars out of 5 and wrote, "Uunchai is a call to the elderly to embrace life and accept change. Ironically, the film itself is stuck in time." Outlook India listed the film in its "Five Content Driven Films of 2022" List.

== Accolades ==
Year	Award	Category	Recipient	Result	Ref.
2023	68th Filmfare Awards	Best Film	Rajshri Productions, Mahaveer Jain Films, Boundless Media	Nominated	
2023	68th Filmfare Awards	Best Director	Sooraj Barjatya	Nominated	
2023	68th Filmfare Awards	Best Actor	Amitabh Bachchan	Nominated	
2023	68th Filmfare Awards	Best Supporting Actor	Anupam Kher	Nominated	
2023	68th Filmfare Awards	Best Story	Sunil Gandhi	Nominated	
2023	68th Filmfare Awards	Best Dialogue	Abhishek Dixit	Nominated	
2023	68th Filmfare Awards	Best Music Director	Amit Trivedi	Nominated	
2024	70th National Film Awards	Best Direction	Sooraj Barjatya	Won	
2024	70th National Film Awards	Best Supporting Actress	Neena Gupta	Won	
