= Vadh 2 =

2025 Indian film by Jaspal Singh Sandhu

- Theatrical release poster
- Directed by: Jaspal Singh Sandhu
- Written by: Jaspal Singh Sandhu; Additional screenplay and dialogues: Neha Shitole; Rahul Sain
- Produced by: Luv Ranjan; Ankur Garg
- Starring: Sanjay Mishra; Neena Gupta
- Cinematography: Sapan Narula
- Edited by: Bharat S. Raawat
- Music by: Songs: Rochak Kohli; Score: Advait Nemlekar
- Production company: Luv Films
- Distributed by: Pen Marudhar (India); Yash Raj Films (Overseas)
- Release dates: 23 November 2025 (Goa); 6 February 2026
- Running time: 131 minutes
- Country: India
- Language: Hindi
- Box office: ₹4.66 crore

Vadh 2 (transl. Execution 2) is a 2026 Indian Hindi-language crime thriller film written and directed by Jaspal Singh Sandhu and produced by Luv Ranjan and Ankur Garg under Luv Films. A spiritual sequel to the 2022 film Vadh, the film stars Sanjay Mishra and Neena Gupta in lead roles.

== Plot ==
Vadh 2 is set primarily within the confines of a small prison in Shivpuri, Madhya Pradesh. Manju is incarcerated for a double murder she insists she did not commit, and her days are spent navigating the brutal and politically charged ecosystem of the jail. Shambhunath Mishra, a weary low-rank police guard nearing retirement, oversees the daily running of the prison. Initially distant and emotionally guarded, Shambhunath slowly forms an unexpected, platonic bond with Manju as the two find themselves sharing long conversations and mutual understanding in the oppressive environment.

Shambhunath and Manju's evolving relationship and the mounting pressure from within the prison walls anchor the narrative, leading to a tense and unpredictable climax that reshapes how both characters view right and wrong.

Within the prison walls, power is dictated by inmates as much as by the authorities. Keshav—better known as Bhure Bhaiya—a dangerous criminal with political backing (being the brother of a local MLA), dominates the internal hierarchy through intimidation and violence, spreading fear among fellow prisoners and even influencing the officials meant to control him. His presence escalates tensions and exposes the fragility of the prison's order.

When Keshav suddenly disappears under mysterious circumstances, panic and suspicion ripple through the jail. To unravel the truth, investigator Ateet Singh is brought in to lead the inquiry into Keshav's disappearance. As interrogations unfold, hidden truths and long-buried secrets begin to surface, forcing both inmates and guards to confront uncomfortable realities about justice, loyalty, and morality.

Amid the procedural unravelling of events, alliances shift and the nature of guilt and innocence becomes increasingly complex. It turns out that Keshav tried to rape a 22-year-old inmate named Naina, but Manju intervened and killed him. She told Ateet of the killing, but called it an execution. Shambhunath hid the dead body in the jailer's quarter and buries a ring belonging to the jailor, to reveal the murders he committed and how he made a false case on Naina. Thus, Shambhunath gave Naina the justice she wanted.

== Cast ==
- Sanjay Mishra as Shambhunath Mishra
- Neena Gupta as Manju Mishra
- Kumud Mishra as Prakash Singh
- Amitt K. Singh as Inspector Ateet Singh
- Yogita Bihani as Naina Kumari
- Akshay Dogra as Keshav
- Shilpa Shukla as Rajni

== Production ==
Principal photography was completed in April 2025.

== Release ==
Vadh 2 had its world premiere at the 56th International Film Festival of India (IFFI) in Goa on 23 November 2025, where it was screened as a gala premiere.

After its screening at the festival, the film was theatrical released on 6 February 2026.

=== Home media ===
The post-theatrical digital streaming rights of the film were acquired by Netflix.

== Reception ==
On the review aggregator website Rotten Tomatoes, 80% of 10 critics' reviews are positive, with an average rating of 6.8/10.

Shubhra Gupta of The Indian Express rated it 2.5/5 stars and writes that "While Neena Gupta and Sanjay Mishra do their job like the seasoned actors they are, the others manage to leave a mark, even if you are left wondering just why a cop’s chiselled chest is given a whole scene to itself." Rahul Desai of The Hollywood Reporter India described it is "A Decent Sequel, A Poignant Crime Drama and fundamentally solid crime thriller."

Mayur Sanap of Rediff.com 3 stars out of 5 and commented that "Sanjay Mishra and Neena Gupta bring their A-game to their roles, and this lived-in quality makes Vadh 2 even more convincing." Lachmi Deb Roy of Firstpost gave 4 stars out of 5 and said that "A story inside a story and an absolute slow burn—that is the beauty of Sanjay Mishra, Neena Gupta, and Kumud Mishra’s film."

Critic of Bollywood Hungama rated it 2/5 stars and stated that "On the whole, VADH 2 is an intriguing thriller with an unpredictable climax. However, the writing has its share of loose ends and moreover, its subject and treatment will mostly appeal to a limited audience." India Today 's Anisha Rao gave 2.5 stars out of 5 and said that "Vadh 2 benefits from its prison setting and dependable performances, but a familiar plot and uneven storytelling prevent it from delivering the tension it promises."
