= Binny and Family =

2024 film by Ssanjay Tripaathy

- Theatrical release poster
- Directed by: Ssanjay Tripaathy
- Written by: Ssanjay Tripaathy; Naman Tripaathy
- Produced by: Ekta Kapoor; Mahaveer Jain; Shashank Khaitan; SK Ahluwalia; Gaurav Bavdankar; A Jhunjhunwala; Mrighdeep Lamba
- Starring: Anjini Dhawan; Pankaj Kapur; Rajesh Kumar; Himani Shivpuri; Charu Shankar; Naman Tripathy
- Cinematography: Mohit Puri
- Edited by: Sourabh Prabhudesai
- Music by: Vishal Mishra; Lalit Pandit
- Production companies: Balaji Motion Pictures; Mahaveer Jain Films; Waveband Production
- Distributed by: PVR Inox Pictures
- Release date: 27 September 2024
- Running time: 129 minutes
- Language: Hindi

Binny and Family is a 2024 Hindi-language film directed by Ssanjay Tripaathy and produced by Balaji Motion Pictures, Mahaveer Jain Films and Waveband Productions. The film is presented by Balaji Telefilms and Mahaveer Jain in association with Shashank Khaitan and Mrighdeep Singh Lamba. It stars Anjini Dhawan, Pankaj Kapur, Rajesh Kumar, Himani Shivpuri, Charu Shankar and Naman Tripathy. It was released on 27 September 2024 to positive reviews.

== Plot ==
Set in London, the story follows Bindiya “Binny” Singh, an Indian-born British teenager living with her parents, Vinay Singh, a university professor, and Radhika Singh, a career counselor. Binny studies at an elite private school, where she serves as the director for the Inter-School Theater Competition. Her closest friend is Bhavesh “BP” Parikh, a wealthy British Indian of Gujarati origin who is deeply invested in social media image and fashion.

Vinay receives a call from his father, Professor S. N. Singh (Baba), informing him that he and his wife Sharada Singh will be visiting London for two months. Radhika expresses concern over Binny's need for personal space, especially with her SATs and final examinations approaching. Prior to Baba and Sharada's arrival, the family conceals elements of their modern lifestyle, such as hiding the minibar and replacing posters in Binny's room with academic materials.

Following their arrival, the family attempts to present an idealized version of themselves. However, tensions arise when Binny returns home intoxicated at 3:00 a.m. after a party. Baba reprimands her and forbids her from attending further social gatherings. Meanwhile, Sharada's lung condition worsens, and Dr. Ghosh advises her to remain in London for further treatment. Despite medical advice, Sharada insists on returning to India.

Encouraged by BP, Binny undergoes a makeover and plans to confess her feelings to her crush Dhruv, a wealthy British-born Indian student involved in the school play. She later witnesses Dhruv kissing another girl and leaves heartbroken, subsequently lashing out at BP. Around the same time, Vinay learns that Sharada has been hospitalized in critical condition. He decides to bring his parents back to London to care for them, a decision that sparks a heated argument with Binny, who feels her personal space is being ignored. After Vinay angrily confronts her, Binny leaves the house, returning only hours later, narrowly avoiding police involvement. Radhika presents Vinay with an ultimatum: prioritize being a good father or a dutiful son.

Vinay falsely informs Baba that Dr. Ghosh has advised Sharada to stay in India and travels to Patna. Sharada dies shortly afterward. During her grandmother's funeral in India, Binny apologizes to Vinay and feels responsible for Sharada's death. She urges her father to bring Baba to London so they can care for him.

Baba relocates to London but remains emotionally withdrawn. On his birthday, Binny attempts to cheer him up, but he reacts angrily. Later, Baba makes an effort to bond with Binny, and along with BP, they spend time together, during which Baba is introduced to smartphones and social media. Inspired by her growing bond with him, Binny writes a play that is approved for the Inter-School World Theater Competition.

While shopping with Baba, Binny encounters Dhruv and behaves coldly toward him. Later, Baba explains his understanding of love to Binny, describing it as freedom rather than possession. This conversation leads Binny to reconcile with Dhruv and learn of his recent breakup.

One day, Baba collapses and is hospitalized. Dr. Ghosh assures the family that Baba's condition is stable. During their conversation, Baba learns that Dr. Ghosh had been in the United States during Sharada's illness, realizing that Vinay had lied about the medical advice. Believing that Vinay's actions contributed to Sharada's death, Baba decides to return to India. Binny confesses that Vinay lied because of her demand for personal space and expresses guilt over the situation. Despite this, Baba leaves, and Binny is devastated.

A month later, Binny's play wins the Inter-School Theater finals. Against expectations, she insists the play end on a somber note. During her acceptance speech, she publicly acknowledges her guilt over her grandmother's death and her regret over her fractured relationship with Baba. Shortly after, she receives an email from Baba urging her to stop blaming herself, along with a forwarded message from Dr. Ghosh stating that Sharada's death was inevitable regardless of treatment location.

Binny reconciles with Baba and encourages him to embrace Vinay, helping bridge their strained relationship. The film concludes during a Grandparents’ Day celebration, where Baba reflects on generational divides, stating that prolonged communication gaps only widen the distance between generations.

== Cast ==
- Anjini Dhawan as Bindiya "Binny" Singh
- Pankaj Kapur as SN Singh
- Himani Shivpuri as Sharada Singh
- Rajesh Kumar as Vinay Singh, Binny's father
- Charu Shankar as Radhika Singh, Binny's mother
- Naman Tripathy as Bhavesh Parikh
- Tai Khan as Dhruv
- Ariya Larker as Sanaya
- Lydia Danistan as Diya
- Gandhar Babre as Dr. Ghosh
- Jyoti Pandey as Vibha
- Manju Gupta as Widow
- Rahul Tomar as Bank Clerk
- Umesh Shukla as Shukla

== Production ==
The film was produced by Mahaveer Jain Films and Wave Band Production and presented in Hindi by Ektaa Kapoor’s Balaji Telefilms in collaboration with Shashank Khaitan and Mrighdeep Singh Lamba.

== Music ==
Binny And Family

Soundtrack album by Vishal Mishra and Lalit Pandit
- Released: 27 September 2024
- Recorded: 2024
- Genre: Feature film soundtrack
- Length: 20:11
- Language: Hindi
- Label: T-Series

Official audio
- Binny And Family - Full Album on YouTube

The music of the film is composed by Vishal Mishra and Lalit Pandit. Lyrics are written by Kaushal Kishore and Ssanjay Tripaathy.

Track listing
No.	Title	Lyrics	Music	Singer(s)	Length
1.	"Zindagi"	Kaushal Kishore	Vishal Mishra	Vishal Mishra	4:41
2.	"Shake the Body"	Ssanjay Tripaathy	Lalit Pandit	Aditi Singh Sharma	2:58
3.	"Kuch Humare" (Female version)	Ssanjay Tripaathy	Lalit Pandit	Sunidhi Chauhan	4:14
4.	"Kuch Humare" (Male version)	Ssanjay Tripaathy	Lalit Pandit	Udit Narayan	4:14
5.	"Ye Kya Alag Sa Lagta Hai"	Ssanjay Tripaathy	Lalit Pandit	Abeer Pandit, Pratibha Singh Baghel	4:04
Total length:					20:11

== Release ==
The film was released on 27 September 2024.
