= Sethu Eyyal =

Indian film director

- Born: 6 January 1971 (age 55); Eyyal, Thrissur, Kerala, India
- Occupations: Film Director, Art Director, Poster Designer
- Years active: 2003 – present

Sethu Eyyal (born 6 January 1971) is an Indian director and artist from Eyyal in Thrissur, Kerala. He was an assistant to A. K. Lohithadas. He is well known for his debut film Shyamaragam (History in the 100 years of Indian Cinema, a musical guru flows through 4 generations of music family of KJ Yesudas), which V. Dakshinamoorthy composed the music for the last time.

== Career ==
He started his film career as an assistant director in the A. K. Lohithadas directed movie Kasthuri Maan, Chakram, Chakkara Muthu and Nivedyam.

== Filmography ==
=== As director ===
| Year | Title | Credited as | | Cast | Notes |
| Year | Title | Director | Writer | Cast | Notes |
|---|---|---|---|---|---|
| 2020 | Shyamaragam | Yes | No | Y. Gee. Mahendra, Shanthi Krishna, Santhosh Keezhattoor, Pranav Suresh, Praseetha Uday | |

=== As associate director ===
| Year | Title | Notes |
|---|---|---|
| 2003 | Chakram | Associate Director |
| 2005 | Kasthuri Maan | Associate Director |
| 2006 | Chakkara Muthu | Associate Director |
| 2007 | Nivedyam | Associate Director |
