= Jaspal Singh Sandhu =

Indian film director

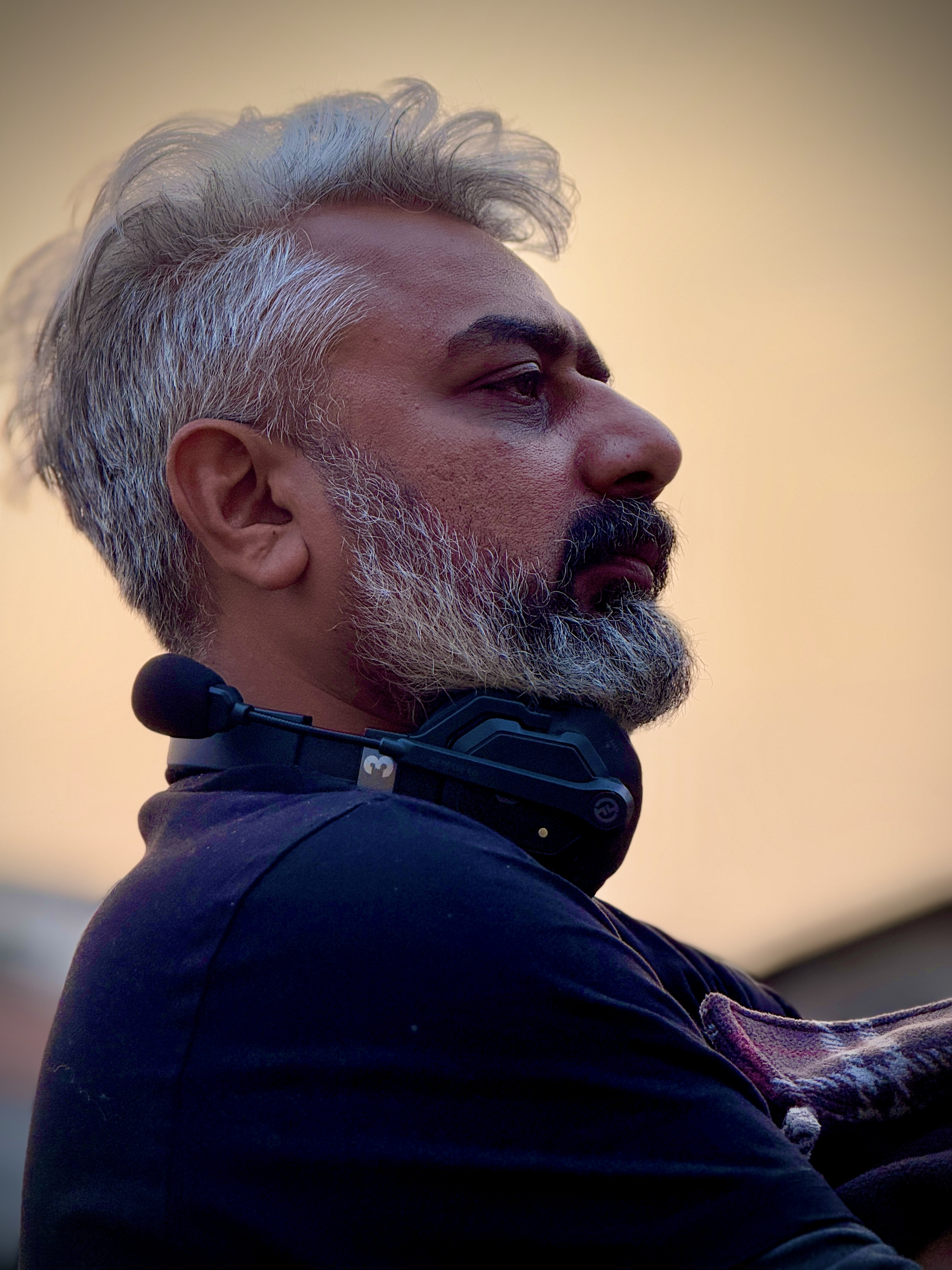
- Born: Punjab, India
- Occupations: Film director, writer, producer, actor
- Years active: 2015–present

Jaspal Singh Sandhu is an Indian film director, writer, producer, and actor.

His film credits include Angrej (2015), Afsar (2018), and Vadh (2022).

Vadh 2, written and directed by Sandhu, is scheduled for release on 6 February 2026.

== Career ==
=== Punjabi film industry ===
In 2015, Sandhu made his debut in Punjabi film industry with the film Angrej starring Amrinder Gill, Sargun Mehta and Ammy Virk. In 2016, he produced the film Love Punjab starring Amrinder Gill and Sargun Mehta. In 2017, he contributed as co-producer in the film Lahoriye, as producer in the film Vekh Baraatan Challiyan and Bhalwan Singh. In 2018, sandhu produced the film Afsar and co-produced the film Golak Bugni Bank Te Batua.

He also acted in the film Uda Aida as vice principal.

=== Hindi film industry ===
Sandhu made his debut in the Hindi film industry with the crime thriller Vadh (2022). He worked on the film as director, writer, producer, and actor, and later directed its sequel, Vadh 2.

== Filmography ==
Year	Film	Actor	Director	Producer	Writer
2015	Angrej			Yes	
2016	Love Punjab			Yes	
2017	Lahoriye			Yes	
2017	Vekh Baraatan Challiyan			Yes	
2017	Bhalwan Singh			Yes	
2018	Afsar			Yes	
2018	Golak Bugni Bank Te Batua			Yes	
2019	Uda Aida	Yes			
2022	Vadh	Yes	Yes	Yes	Yes
2026	Vadh 2		Yes		Yes

== Awards and nominations ==
Year	Work	Award	Category	Result	Ref.
2023	Vadh	Filmfare Awards	Filmfare Award for Best Debut Director	Won	
