= Netaji Subhas Chandra Bose Setu =

Bridge in India

Netaji Subhas Chandra Bose Setu Netaji Setu
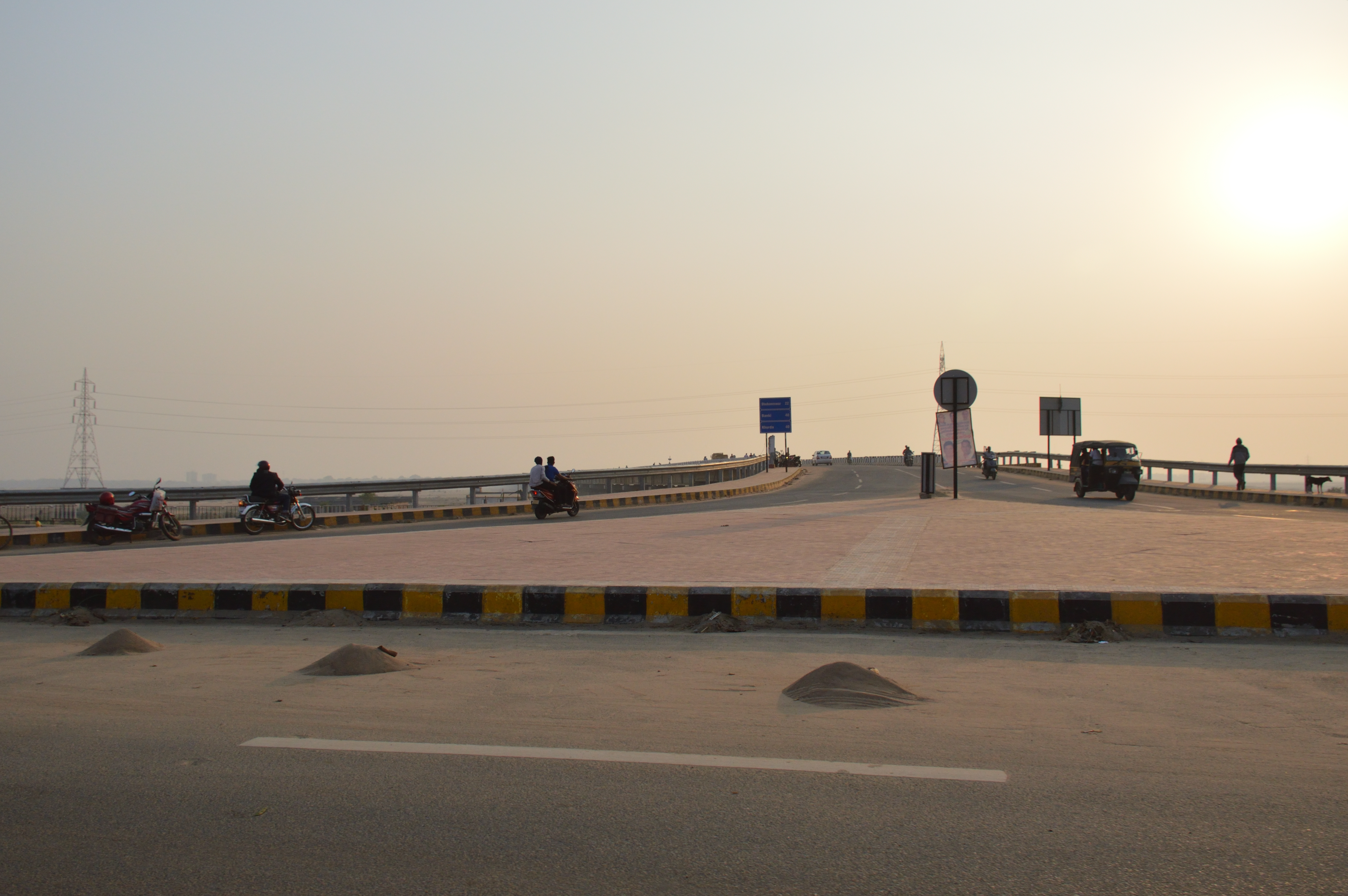
- Coordinates: 20°27′21″N 85°50′55″E
- Carries: Three lane roadway and pedestrian pathways each side
- Crosses: Kathajodi (distributary of Mahanadi)
- Named for: Subhas Chandra Bose
- Maintained by: Government of Odisha

Characteristics
- Design: Girder bridge
- Material: Steel and Concrete
- Total length: 2,880 metres (9,450 ft)
- Width: 14.8 metres (49 ft)
- Longest span: 45 metres (148 ft)
- No. of spans: 67

History
- Constructed by: HES Infra Pvt Ltd
- Construction end: 2017

Location
- Interactive map of Netaji Subhas Chandra Bose Setu

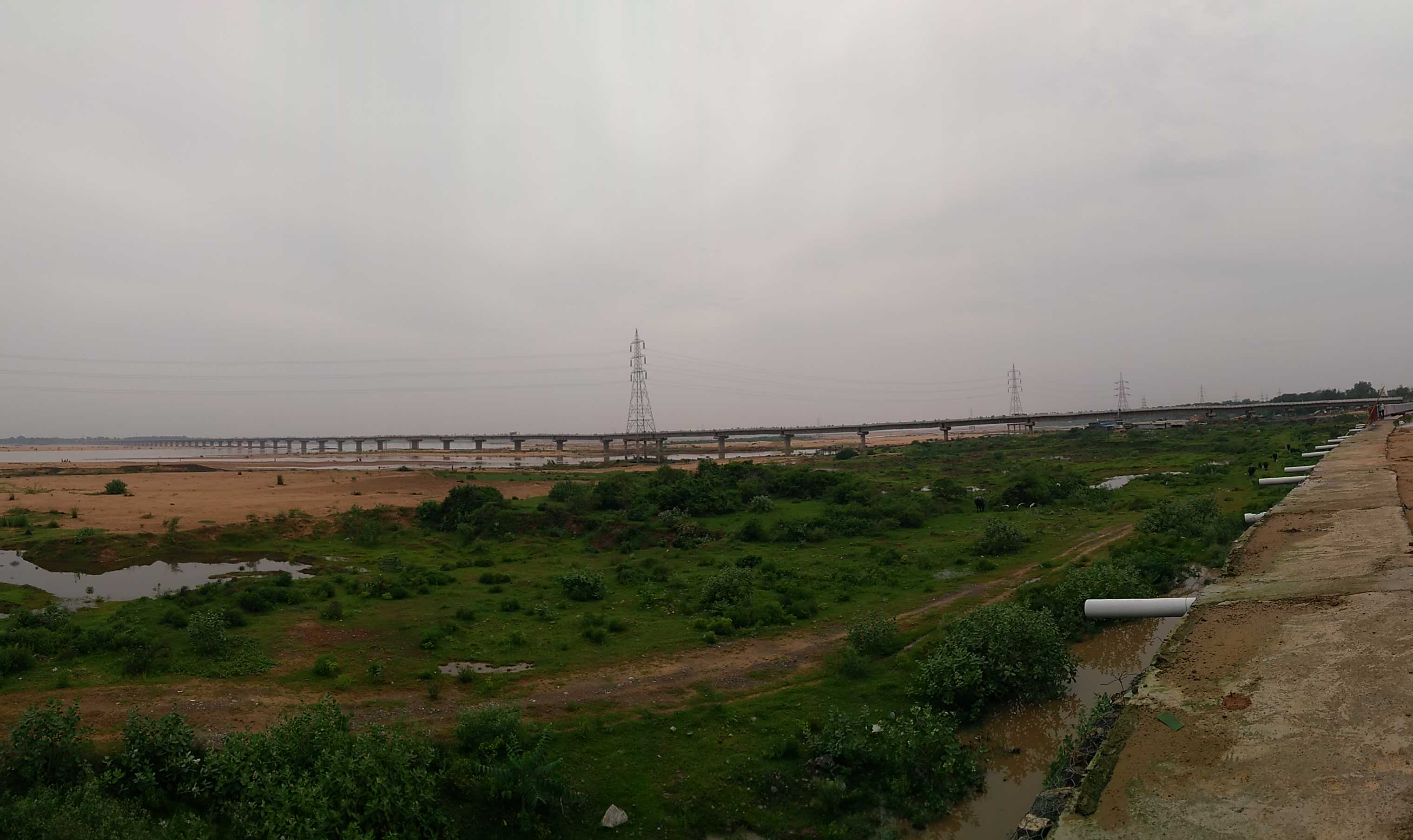
Netaji Subhas Chandra Bose Setu from Cuttack side.

Netaji Subhas Chandra Bose Setu (also called Netaji Setu) is a bridge over the river Kathajodi, a distributary of the Mahanadi connecting Belleview Point near Judicial Academy in Cuttack to Trishulia. The length of the bridge is 2.88 km and is the longest bridge in Odisha. It was inaugurated by the Chief Minister of Odisha, Naveen Patnaik on 19 July 2017. It is the first 3 lane bridge in Odisha and reduces the distance between Bhubaneswar and Cuttack by 12 km. The bridge was named after Netaji Subhas Chandra Bose who was born and brought up in Cuttack. It was constructed at a cost of ₹114 crore, the bridge was built to ease congestion on NH‑16 and reduce travel time between the twin cities.

== History ==
The construction of Netaji Subhas Chandra Bose Setu began in February 2011, engineered by HES Infra Pvt Ltd, and the bridge was inaugurated by Odisha Chief Minister Naveen Patnaik on 19 July 2017, at a cost of approximately ₹114 crore. It was named after freedom fighter Netaji Subhas Chandra Bose, who was born and raised in Cuttack, the bridge serves as a symbolic tribute to his legacy. It is Odisha's longest bridge at 2.88 km and the state's first three-lane bridge, built to alleviate congestion on NH‑16 and reduce travel distance between Bhubaneswar and Cuttack by around 12 km.

== Structure ==
The Netaji Subhas Chandra Bose Setu is designed as a girder structure using steel and reinforced concrete, stretching 2,880 m in total with a width of 14.8 m, and features a main span of 45 m distributed across 67 spans. It carries three traffic lanes with pedestrian pathways on both sides, supported on 12 piers. It is equipped with solar-powered LED street lighting, including 494 LED lights and 247 posts, enhancing safety and energy efficiency. Built to serve heavy daily vehicle traffic, the bridge enabled significant urban integration and has become a key infrastructural link within the greater Cuttack-Bhubaneswar region.
