= Adams Street Bridge =

Bridge in Chicago, Illinois, U.S.

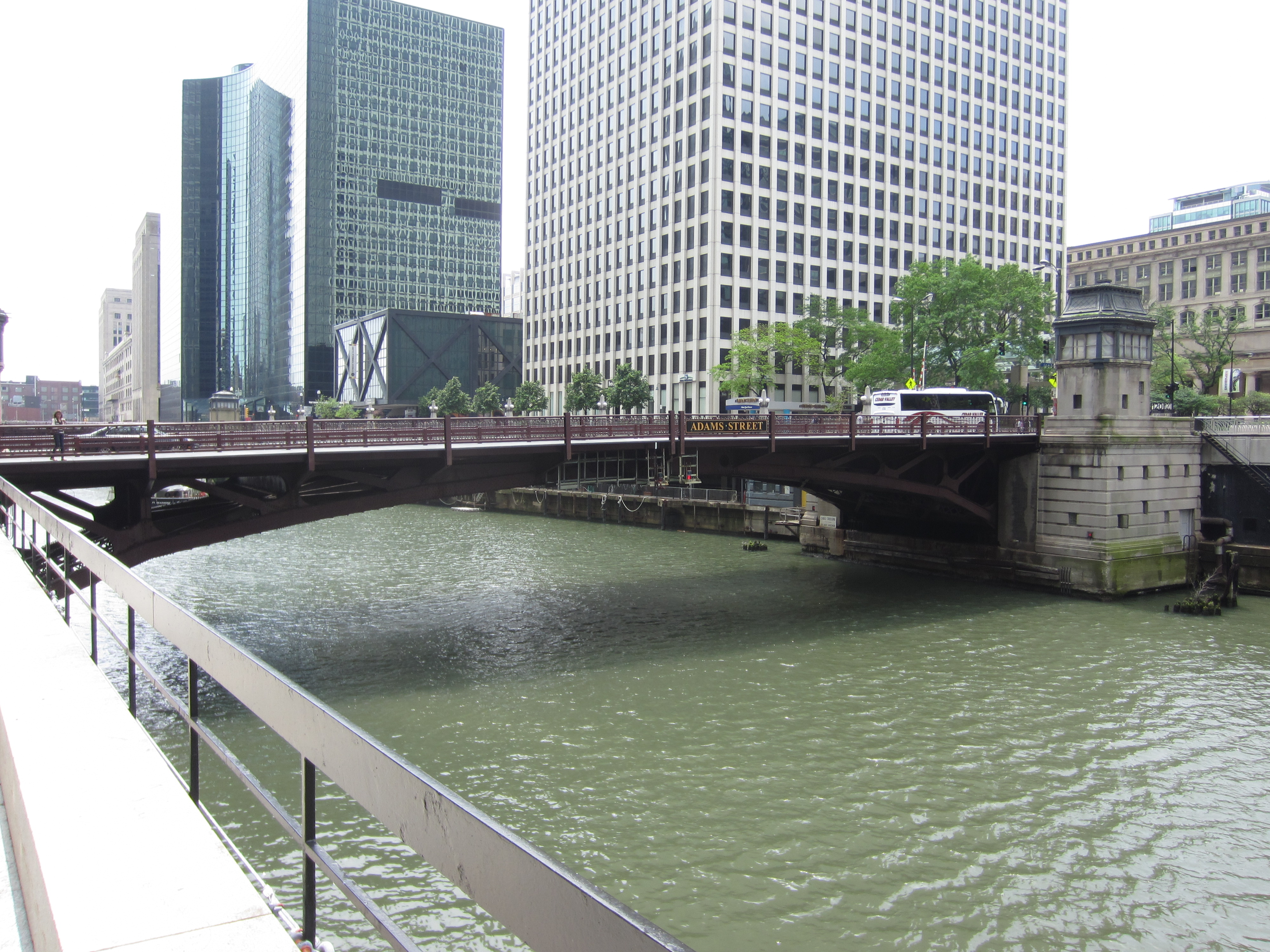
- The bridge in 2015
- Coordinates: 41°52′46″N 87°38′17″W

The Adams Street Bridge is a bridge that spans the Chicago River in downtown Chicago, Illinois.
