= Mahaveer Jain =

Indian film producer

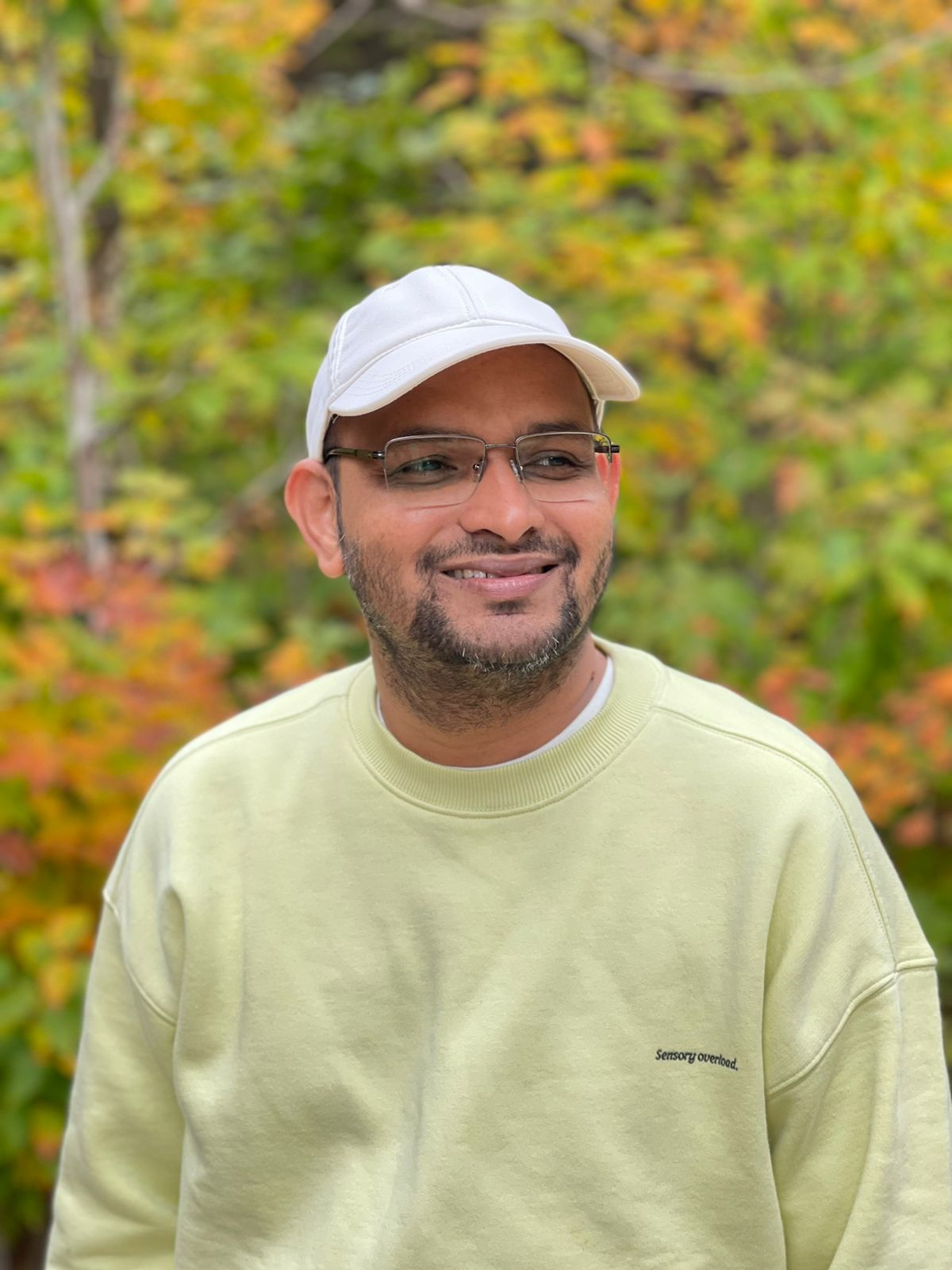
- Occupation: Film Producer

Mahaveer Jain is an Indian film producer. He is mostly known for producing Hindi movies, which include Dekh Indian Circus (2011), Chalo Jeetey Hain (2018), Malaal (2019), Khandaani Shafakhana (2019), Uunchai (2022), Ram Setu (2022), Good Luck Jerry (2022) and Binny and Family (2024).

== Career ==
Mahaveer started his career as a producer in 2011 with Dekh Indian Circus, featuring Tannishtha Chatterjee and Nawazuddin Siddiqui. The film won 4 national awards at the 60th National Film Awards in 2012. In 2018, he produced Chalo Jeete Hain, a short film inspired by events from the childhood days of Indian Prime Minister Narendra Modi. The movie won the National Award for the Best non-feature film on family values at the 66th National Film Awards. In 2019, he produced Malaal along with Sanjay Leela Bhansali, Bhushan Kumar and Krishan Kumar. In the same year, he also co-produced Khandaani Shafakhana with Mrighdeep Singh Lamba, starring Sonakshi Sinha and Badshah.

In 2022, his production company Mahaveer Jain Films produced Uunchai jointly with Rajshri Productions and Boundless Media. The movie was directed by Sooraj R Barjatya, featuring Amitabh Bachchan, Boman Irani, Parineeti Chopra and Anupam Kher. In the same year, he produced Ram Setu, starring Akshay Kumar and Jacqueline Fernandez. He produced Good Luck Jerry in 2022, featuring Janhvi Kapoor and Sushant Singh. In October 2023, Mahaveer collaborated with Warner Music India to launch Global Peace Anthem named 'Coming Home'.

== Filmography ==
Key
†	Denotes films that have not yet been released

Year	Title	Notes
2011	Dekh Indian Circus	
2018	Chalo Jeete Hain	Short film
2019	Malaal	
2019	Khandaani Shafakhana	
2022	Uunchai	
2022	Ram Setu	
2022	Good Luck Jerry	Released on Disney+ Hotstar
2024	Binny and Family	
2026	Lambodhara 2.0	Kannada film
2026	Yeh Prem Mol Liya †	
2027	Naagzilla †	
2027	Side Heroes †	
2027	Mera Yaar Bajrangi †	
TBA	White †	
TBA	RamBola †	
TBA	Kabira †	

== Awards and nominations ==
Year	Award	Category	Film	Results	Ref.(s)
2012	60th National Film Awards	Best Children's film award	Dekh Indian Circus	Won	
2012	16th Busan International Film Festival	Audience choice best popular film award	Dekh Indian Circus	Won	
2018	66th National Film Awards	Best non-feature film on family values	Chalo Jeetey Hain	Won	
