= Farakka Setu =

- Coordinates: 24.800201°N 87.936061°E
- Carries: National Highway 12
- Crosses: Ganges River
- Locale: Farakka, West Bengal, India
- Other name(s): Farakka Bridge
- Maintained by: National Highways Authority of India

Characteristics
- Design: Girder bridge
- Total length: 5,468 metres (17,940 ft)
- Width: 25 metres (82 ft)
- No. of spans: 43
- No. of lanes: 4

History
- Constructed by: RKEC Projects; Quingdao Construction Company
- Construction start: 1 January 2019; 6 years ago
- Construction cost: ₹622.04 crore (US$74 million)
- Opening: 31 july 2025 (planned)

Statistics
- Daily traffic: 13000 vehicles daily (estimated after completion)

The Farakka Setu or New Farakka Bridge is an under construction road bridge spanning the Ganga river, 500 meters downstream of the Farakka Barrage. Once completed, the bridge aims to alleviate traffic congestion on the Farakka Barrage and enhance connectivity between North Bengal and South Bengal. Upon completion, the bridge, including its approach roads, will span an impressive 5.468 km (3.398 mi), making it the longest bridge in West Bengal over water & the 7th longest in India . Initially estimated at ₹521 crore (US$62 million), the total construction cost has since been revised to ₹622.04 crore (US$74 million). Construction began in January 2019, RKEC Projects is working on the construction of the bridge in conjunction with Qingdao Construction Engineering to bring the bridge to life.

== History ==
=== Project Approval ===
In October 2016, India's Union Council of Ministers passed a bill for the construction of the bridge. At the beginning of 2018, construction work was given to a foreign company.

=== Construction ===
On January 1 2019, RKEC Projects began construction. Work began on the north bank of the Ganges from Lakshmipur in the Malda district and Farakka in the Murshidabad district on the south bank. Two separate roads cross the 4 lane bridge, each 12.5 meters wide.

== Accident ==
On February 16, 2020, while construction of a girder was underway between Pillars 1 and 2, the girder broke, causing 2 fatalities and 7 injuries.
