= Utkal Gourab Madhusudan Setu =

Bridge in India

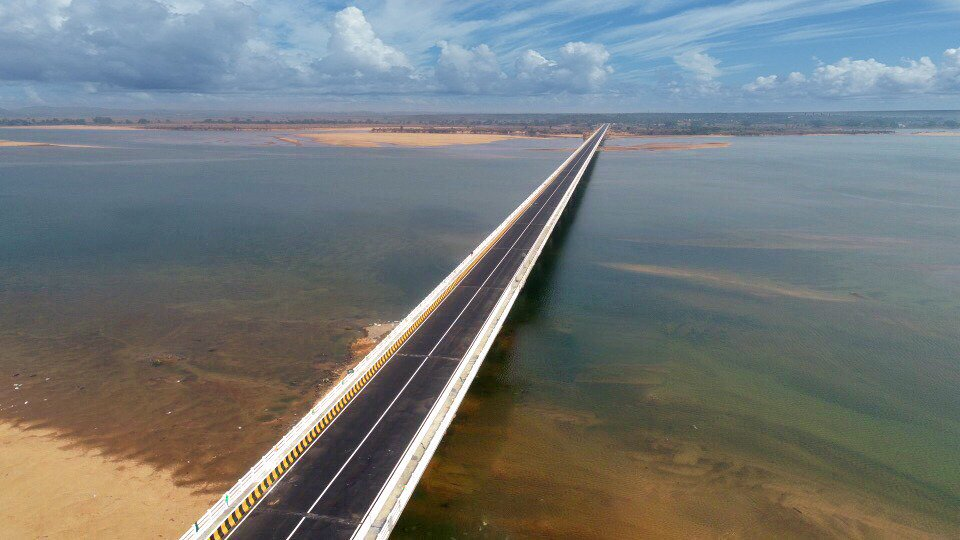
- View of Utkal Gourab Madhusudan Setu
- Coordinates: 20.486833°N 85.816491°E
- Carries: Road
- Crosses: Mahanadi River
- Locale: Cuttack-Nuapatna

Characteristics
- Material: RCC
- Total length: 2,583 metres (8,474 ft)

History
- Opened: 01 April 2018

Location
- Interactive map of Utkal Gourab Madhusudan Setu

Utkal Gourab Madhusudan Setu is a bridge connecting Cuttack and Athagarh. This bridge over river Mahanadi reduces distance between Cuttack, Dhenkanal by 16 kilometres (9.9 mi). The bridge was inaugurated by Naveen Patnaik and opened to public on 01.04.2018. Length of this bridge is 2,583 metres (8,474 ft) long. It is named after Madhusudan Das, famed lawyer, freedom fighter.
