= Vadh (2022 film) =

2022 Indian film by Jaspal Singh Sandhu

- Theatrical release poster
- Directed by: Jaspal Singh Sandhu; Rajiv Barnwal
- Written by: Jaspal Singh Sandhu; Rajiv Barnwal
- Produced by: Luv Ranjan; Ankur Garg; Neeraj Ruhil; Nymphea Saraf Sandhu; Subhav Sharma
- Starring: Sanjay Mishra; Neena Gupta; Manav Vij; Saurabh Sachdeva
- Cinematography: Sapan Narula
- Edited by: Bharat S Rawat
- Music by: Gurcharan Singh
- Production companies: Luv Films; J Studio; Next Level Productions
- Distributed by: Yash Raj Films
- Release date: 9 December 2022
- Running time: 110 minutes
- Country: India
- Language: Hindi

Vadh (transl. Execution) is a 2022 Indian Hindi-language crime drama film written and directed by Jaspal Singh Sandhu, Rajiv Barnwal and produced by Luv Films. Vadh was theatrically released on 9 December 2022. It was featured at the 54th IFFI Indian panorama section.

== Plot ==
Shambhunath "Shambhu" Mishra, a retired teacher in Gwalior, lives with his wife Manju in poverty. Their only son, Guddu, has settled in America and refuses to support them, despite their mortgaging the family house to fund his education abroad. Shambhu struggles to repay the loan taken from Prajapati Pandey, a gangster and loan shark who enjoys protection from corrupt police officer Shakti Singh. Pandey frequently threatens the couple, and during one such visit he develops sinister intentions toward Naina, Shambhu's young student. Unable to bear it, Shambhu kills him in a fit of rage.

Shambhu hides the murder, but suspicion soon falls on him when Pandey disappears. Shakti Singh, who also clashes with Pandey over bribes, begins investigating but finds no evidence. Meanwhile, MLA Rathore, for whom Pandey worked, pressures Shambhu to vacate his house. Shambhu and Manju seek help from their son, only to be rejected and insulted. Later, Shambhu discovers Pandey's phone, which contains compromising videos that could ruin Shakti's career, explaining why the officer desperately wants it back.

After being beaten by Rathore's men, Shambhu is hospitalised. There he confesses the truth to Shakti and hands over Pandey's phone, along with the hidden murder evidence. Sympathetic to Shambhu's plight, Shakti covers up the crime by framing Rathore for Pandey's murder. In the end, Shambhu and Manju move into a new house and decide to gift their old one to Naina.

== Cast ==
- Sanjay Mishra as Shambhunath Mishra
- Neena Gupta as Manju Mishra
- Saurabh Sachdeva as Prajapati Pandey
- Manav Vij as Shakti Singh
- Nadeem Khan as Constable Sitaram Gadariya
- Jaspal Singh Sandhu as 'Dada' alias Rathore
- Sumit Gulati as Bittu
- Ananya Singh as Naina
- Umesh Kaushik as Navin
- Diwakar Kumar as Diwakar Mishra
- Pranjal Pateriya as Bakery owner
- Abhitosh Singh Rajput as Pawan
- Tanya Lal as Pandey's wife

== Critical reception ==
On the review aggregator website Rotten Tomatoes, 50% of 6 critics' reviews are positive, with an average rating of 5.5/10.

Sonal Pandya reviewing for Hindustan Times praised the performances of Mishra and Gupta. Pooja Biraia Jaiswal reviewing for The Week rated 4/5 and praised Mishra and Gupta. Deepa Gahlot reviewing for Scroll.in praised the performances of Mishra, Gupta and Vij.

== Accolades ==
Award	Date of ceremony	Category	Nominee	Result	Ref(s)
Filmfare Awards	17 April 2023	Best Film (Critics)	Jaspal Singh Sandhu and Rajeev Barnwal	Nominated	
Filmfare Awards	17 April 2023	Best Debut Director	Jaspal Singh Sandhu and Rajeev Barnwal	Won	
Filmfare Awards	17 April 2023	Best Story	Jaspal Singh Sandhu and Rajeev Barnwal	Nominated	
Filmfare Awards	17 April 2023	Best Screenplay	Jaspal Singh Sandhu and Rajeev Barnwal	Nominated	
Filmfare Awards	17 April 2023	Best Actor (Critics)	Sanjay Mishra	Won	
Filmfare Awards	17 April 2023	Best Actress (Critics)	Neena Gupta	Nominated	

== Sequel ==
The sequel for the film, titled Vadh 2 completion was made by Luv Films on 16 April 2025.
