= Ram Setu (film) =

2022 Indian film by Abhishek Sharma

- Theatrical release poster
- Directed by: Abhishek Sharma
- Written by: Story & Screenplay: Abhishek Sharma; Dialogues: Abhishek Sharma; Chandraprakash Dwivedi
- Produced by: Aruna Bhatia; Vikram Malhotra; Subaskaran; Mahaveer Jain; Aashish Singh
- Starring: Akshay Kumar; Jacqueline Fernandez; Pravessh Rana; Nushrratt Bharuccha; Satyadev
- Cinematography: Aseem Mishra
- Edited by: Rameshwar S. Bhagat
- Music by: Score: Daniel B. George; Songs: Ajay-Atul; Vikram Montrose; Ved Sharma; Dr Zeus
- Production companies: Amazon Prime Video; Cape of Good Films; Lyca Productions; Abundantia Entertainment; Mahaveer Jain Films; Zee Studios
- Distributed by: Zee Studios
- Release date: 25 October 2022
- Running time: 143 minutes
- Country: India
- Language: Hindi
- Budget: ₹150 crore
- Box office: est. ₹92.94 crore

Ram Setu (transl. The Bridge of Rama) is a 2022 Indian Hindi-language action-adventure film directed by Abhishek Sharma. The film stars Akshay Kumar, Jacqueline Fernandez, Nushrratt Bharuccha and Satyadev and follows an archaeologist who is investigating the nature of Ram Setu (known as Adam's Bridge in English).

The film was announced in November 2020 with principal photography commencing in Mumbai on 30 March 2021. Production suffered setbacks and delays amid the COVID-19 pandemic. Filming resumed in October 2021 and wrapped in January 2022 taking place near Ooty, Gujarat, Daman and Diu, Maldives and Mumbai.

Ram Setu was theatrically released on 25 October 2022, coinciding with Diwali and received negative reviews from critics.

== Plot ==
Dr Aryan Kulshreshtha, an ASI archaeologist, is a strong believer in scientific facts and an atheist. He, along with an international team from India, Pakistan, Afghanistan, and Japan, discovers the treasure of Raja Dahir and a large reclining Buddha statue near the Buddhas of Bamyan in Afghanistan after their destruction by the Taliban. The treasure is later divided between India and Pakistan in Islamabad. (Note: Such a colossal statue of about 300 metres (980 ft) has been mentioned by Xuanzang. In 2008, a separate 3rd-century statue of the reclining Buddha measuring 19 metres (62 ft) in length was found near the Buddhas of Bamyan.)

In 2007, Aryan was asked to draft a report for the Supreme Court of India on the natural formation of the Ram Setu to support the government's canal project. Initially reluctant, he submits a report stating that the Ramayana is a work of fiction, which questions the existence of Rama. This causes public outrage, leading to Aryan's suspension. (Note: In a 2007 petition over the Sethusamudram Shipping Canal Project filed by religious parties opposing its construction, the government of India had informed the Supreme Court of India in affidavit, with an Archaeological Survey of India report, stating that there was no historical proof of the bridge being built by Rama.)

Aryan receives an offer from a businessman, Indrakant, who wants the Ram Setu demolished to save fuel for a marine project. He persuades Aryan to join a mission to research the origins of the Ram Setu. Aryan, along with Dr Sandra Rebello and Dr Gabrielle, discovers that the Ram Setu is around 18,000 years old, which predates Rama himself. Further investigation reveals that the structure might have been man-made around 7,000 years ago, possibly built by Rama. Aryan reports this to Indrakant, who reveals his true intent of demolishing the Ram Setu for economic gain and orders their assassination.

During an underwater mission, Aryan, Sandra, and Gabrielle are trapped in a malfunctioning submarine but are saved by a mysterious man named AP, who takes them to a remote island in Sri Lanka amidst the Sri Lankan Civil War. AP helps them escape from their pursuers. Gabrielle is shot and killed during a confrontation, but Aryan, with Sandra and AP, continues his research, finding evidence linking the Ram Setu to the Ramayana. They also uncover proof of Ravana's existence in Lanka, suggesting that Ram Setu was indeed built by Rama.

After escaping, Aryan successfully presents his findings in court, proving that the Ram Setu is man-made, halting the canal project. Later, Aryan discovers that AP, who had disappeared, is actually Lord Hanuman in disguise, guiding him to the truth about Ram Setu. (Note: Anjaneya (from Anjana) being another name of Hanuman.)

== Cast ==
- Akshay Kumar as Dr. Aryan Kulshrestha, an archaeologist with the ASI
- Nushrratt Bharuccha as Professor Gayatri Kulshrestha, Aryan's wife
- Jacqueline Fernandez as Dr. Sandra Rebello
- Satyadev as Anjaneyan Pushpakumaran "AP"
- Anngad Raaj as Kabir Kulshreshtha, Aryan and Gayatri's son
- Jeniffer Piccinato as Dr. Gabrielle
- Nassar as Indrakant
- Pravessh Rana as Project Manager Bali
- Shweta Kawatra as Lawyer
- Varun Pande as Male Indian Reporter
- Darshan Pandya as Bilawal
- Bhavana Rai as Tamiko

== Production ==
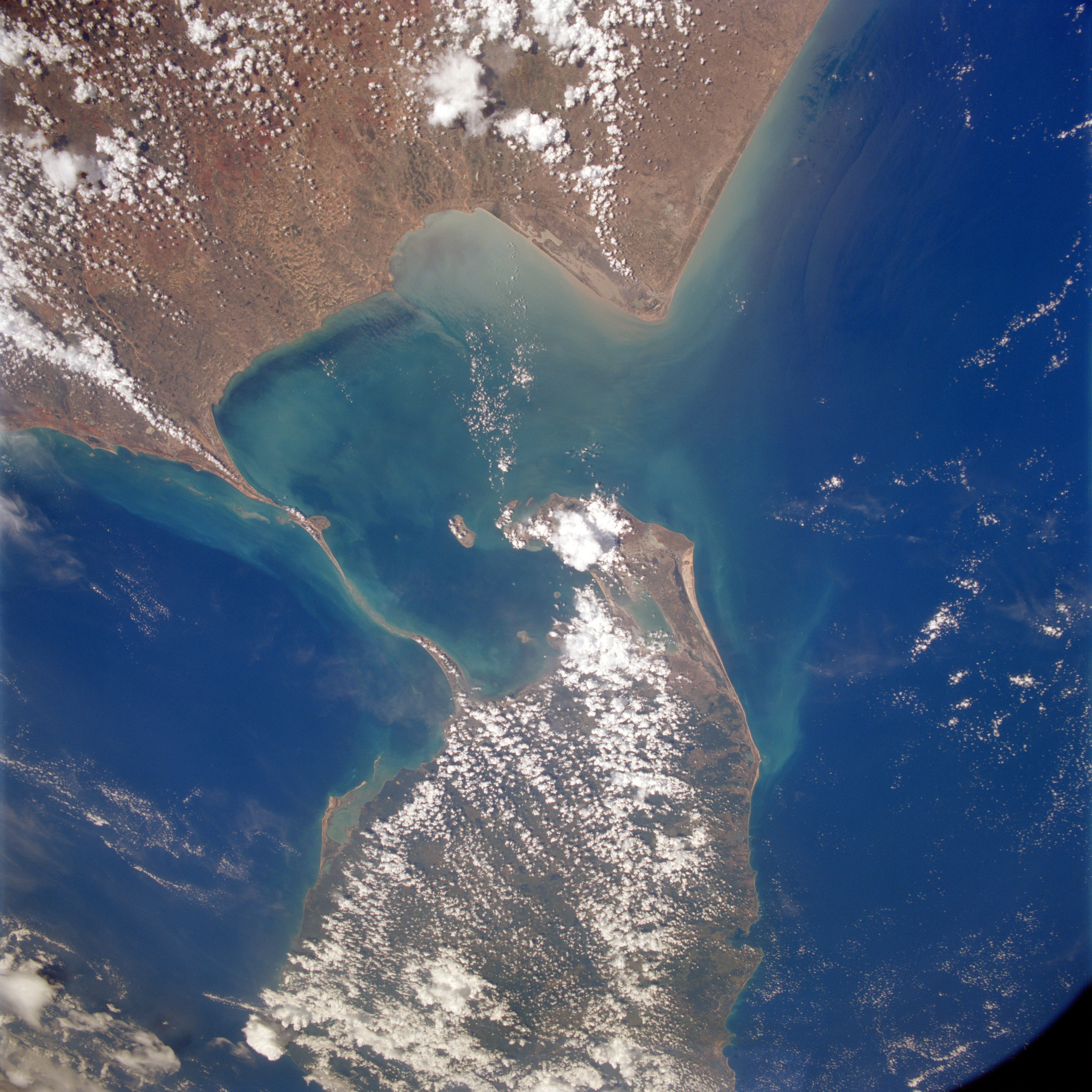
Adam's Bridge, also known as Ram Setu or Rama Setu, as seen in NASA satellite photo: India on top, Sri Lanka at the bottom.

=== Development ===
According to a report in The Financial Express, director Abhishek Sharma has been trying to build a plot since 2007 when he became aware of a court case involving Rama Setu. The film is co-produced by Akshay Kumar's mother Aruna Bhatia and Vikram Malhotra under the production companies Kumar's Cape of Good Films, Abundantia Entertainment, Lyca Productions and Amazon Prime Video. This is Amazon's first Bollywood production in India. Aruna Bhatia died in September 2021. Chandraprakash Dwivedi was signed as the creative producer. Kumar described the film as "a bridge between generations past, present and future". Co-producer Vikram Malhotra, CEO of Abundantia Entertainment, touted the film as "a story formed on facts, science and historical heritage".

The film team consulted the book Dating The Era of Lord Ram (2004), as well as experts in archeology and other areas. It was produced by Prime Video in association of Cape of Good Flims and Mahavir Jain Flims and produced by Abundantia Entertainment.

=== Casting ===
In early March 2021, media reports confirmed that Jacqueline Fernandez and Nushrratt Bharuccha were signed up to play lead roles in the film opposite Kumar. In June 2021, Satyadev revealed that he will be a part of the film, marking his debut in Hindi cinema.

=== Filming ===
The official announcement of the film was on 14 November 2020 coinciding with Diwali. Earlier reports in December 2020 suggested that the film shooting would take place in Ayodhya and the proposed film city in Gautam Buddha Nagar district of National Capital Region in Uttar Pradesh. The muhurat shot followed by a puja ceremony by the team was held on 18 March 2021 at Ram Janmabhoomi temple in Ayodhya. A planned visit to Ram ki Paidi ghats in Ayodhya by the lead actors was cancelled due to a large uncontrolled gathering of people.

==== COVID-19 break ====
Principal photography began on 30 March 2021 in Mumbai. A massive set was constructed on Madh Island where the shooting was scheduled to start on 5 April. However, on 4 April, Kumar tested positive for COVID-19, and a day later, on 5 April 45 members of the filming crew tested positive, leading to the filming being indefinitely halted. Co-producer Malhotra denied the reports, claimed they were "absolutely inaccurate and a total misrepresentation of facts" and said that 25 people who tested positive, at an off-location testing site, were removed from those who had qualified to be part of the filming crew.

At the same time, the Government of Maharashtra imposed a lockdown to curb the spread of the second wave of the COVID-19 pandemic. This, combined with many crew members testing positive, led the filmmakers to cancel the Mumbai schedule and demolish the set on Madh Island.

Kumar then went to work on his other films, including Raksha Bandhan, Cuttputlli which had a two-month long schedule in London that ended in October, before returning to shooting for Ram Setu.

==== Shooting ====
Earlier reports indicated that filming would resume in September 2021, However, it only did in mid-October 2021 with a schedule in Ooty. Major underwater action scenes, oceanic shoots, and climax were to be shot in Sri Lanka. This was not possible due to the COVID-19 pandemic in Sri Lanka which made it difficult for the filming team to travel under quarantine restrictions. The filmmakers scouted for an alternate location in Kerala and Gujarat. Due to rising cases of COVID in Kerala, it was not selected. At the end, Daman and Diu were chosen for shooting. Some scenes were also shot in Mumbai and the sequences were finished. By 5 December, shooting in Diu was completed. On 31 January 2022, Kumar wrapped up shooting. An actual exosuit was planned to be used for the underwater scenes, however, due to the challenges of wearing it and shooting in it, the team opted for a replica. The film was made at a cost of ₹150 crore (US$16 million). The budget of the film is Rs. 85 Crore.

== Soundtrack ==
Ram Setu

Soundtrack album by Ajay-Atul, Vikram Montrose, Ved Sharma and Dr. Zeus
- Released: 1 November 2022
- Recorded: 2021–22
- Studios: YRF Studios & Future Sound of Bombay
- Genre: Feature film soundtrack
- Length: 29:38
- Label: Zee Music Company

Official audio
- Ram Setu - Full Album on YouTube

Singles from Ram Setu
- 1. "Jai Shree Ram" Released: 20 October 2022; 2. "Om Namah Shivaay" Released: 25 October 2022

The music of the film is composed by Ajay-Atul, Vikram Montrose, Ved Sharma and Dr. Zeus. Lyrics are penned by Irshad Kamil, Manoj Muntashir, Shekhar Astitwa and Baljit Singh Padam. The film score is composed by Daniel B. George.

Track listing
| No. | Title | Lyrics | Music | Singer(s) | Length |
|---|---|---|---|---|---|
| 1. | "Whatte Fun" | Irshad Kamil | Ajay-Atul | Vishal Dadlani, Neeti Mohan, Arivu | 3:37 |
| 2. | "Jai Shree Ram" | Shekhar Astitwa | Vikram Montrose | Vikram Montrose | 3:59 |
| 3. | "Bahut Din Beete" | Manoj Muntashir | Ved Sharma | Ved Sharma, Raja Hasan | 3:55 |
| 4. | "Om Namah Shivaay" | Traditional | Dr. Zeus | Krishna Das, Priceless | 18:07 |
| Total length: | | | | | 29:38 |

== Marketing ==
In late April 2022, the filmmakers released a poster depicting Akshay Kumar, Satyadev and Fernandez. The poster, which went viral, was soon met with cyber-trolling on social media in the form of memes as Akshay Kumar is seen holding a burning torch while Fernandez is seen holding a powerful torchlight. In October, the filmmakers released a mobile game featuring the main characters of the film–Dr. Aryan Kulshrestha, Sandra and AP.

== Release ==
=== Theatrical ===
In June 2022, reports surfaced claiming that Ram Setu would have an OTT release instead of a theatrical release. Some reports claimed that this was due to underperformance of Kumar's earlier films–Samrat Prithviraj (2022) and Bachchhan Paandey (2022). The filmmakers clarified the reports to be inauthentic and that the film would have a theatrical release. The film was released on 25 October 2022 under Zee Studios Worldwide Release, during Diwali festivities.

=== Home media ===
The film began streaming on Amazon Prime Video from 23 December 2022.

== Reception ==
=== Box office ===
Ram Setu opened in theaters to expectations from trade analysts of having a good opening at the box office given the release during the holiday season surrounding Diwali. The film competed with the Ajay Devgn-starred Thank God, which was released on the same day, and managed to gain higher share of the box office collections. During its earlier run, the film, which was released a day after Diwali, took advantage of the festive-season holidays; however the collections fell short of expectations of analysts. The film collected ₹15.25 crore at the domestic box office on its opening day and ₹11.4 crore on its second day. It became the second biggest opening in terms of box office collections for the year with Brahmāstra: Part One – Shiva in the lead. The film has grossed ₹85.56 crore domestic and ₹7.38 crore overseas taking the worldwide collection of ₹92.94 crore as of 24 November.

=== Critical response ===
Ram Setu received negative reviews from critics. On the review aggregator website Rotten Tomatoes, 11% of 9 critics' reviews are positive, with an average rating of 3.2/10.

Shubhra Gupta of The Indian Express rated the film 1.5 out of 5 stars and termed the film as a "pedestrian experience" and interested only in hammering home its message". Anna M. M. Vetticad of Firstpost called the movie a Hindutva project, noting that the director unapologetically obscured the difference between fact and fiction by having "no credible progression in the script" in Kumar's character's turn from a proud atheist into social media propagandist. She criticized the "limp storytelling", the amateur and "blatantly wannabe-Bahubaali" visual effects, and the performance of the cast, but praised that of Satyadev's. Vetticad also wrote that it was "surprisingly flat for a film dealing with potentially explosive material". Namrata Joshi reviewing for Screen International wrote that the plot lacks imagination and originality, and the action scenes without thrill. She opined that the film portrayed Hindu supremacy, rather hidden across the narrative, and Hindu victimhood in parallel. She concluded that Ram Setu is yet another propaganda film in the right-wing Bollywood in which Akshay Kumar acts as the flag bearer, and the film turned out unimpressive. Subhash K. Jha wrote in Firstpost that the film depends on Hindutva ideology and later forces itself into mythology. He opined that the film has been part of a larger efforts by the left-wing of mocking and diminishing any film that has a pro-Hindutva core and noted that the understanding of the film as a "pro-establishment propaganda" is baseless. He found the performance of the entire cast, except that of Satyadev's, to be dull. He also noted that the film could have focused on the debate of faith vs blind faith rather indulged in Indiana Jones-like adventure.

Saibal Chatterjee reviewing for NDTV rated 1/5 and wrote that the film presents theories about Indian history that do not concur with scientific and scholarly studies blurring the lines between history, mythology and fantasy. He wrote that the film is "[p]oorly written, shoddily mounted and badly acted" posing a clueless crew with primitive visual effects ultimately presenting a message to chastize non-believers of Rama. Tina Das reviewing for ThePrint rated 2.5/5 and wrote that the film tries to convince the audience that Hinduism, and religion in general, redeems them. She wrote about Kumar's performance as unconvincing despite trying to imitate the protagonists of Indiana Jones and National Treasure; she wrote that the film incorporated Hindutva ideology along with history and myth and criticized visual effects and CGI animation to be faulty. She opined that if one manages to ignore these nuances, the film would be thrilling. Nandini Ramnath in Scroll.in criticised Ram Setu describing it as "WhatsApp forwards with visual effects". She wrote, "[t]here is no scope for logic or even basic common sense in a narrative that insists that religious belief must be placed above secular knowledge." She also found the plot and the performance of the cast to be lacking. Anuj Kumar of The Hindu criticized the movie stating that it is similar to cultural manifesto of the ruling Bharatiya Janata Party-led government. He compared the film with Vivek Agnihotri-directed The Kashmir Files (2022)–where both the films depicted liberal and secular values within the Hindu society as a danger that needs to be dealt with; both the films were written with from the point-of-view of the persecution complex of the majority and preach Hindus that they are amidst a war between civilizations. He also noted that the film depicts those holding contrarian views and those who do not have faith in Rama are to be retaliated against. He found the cast performance to be subpar and the visual effects to be fake.

Abhimanyu Mathur reviewing for Hindustan Times found the film to be fun and thrilling. He wrote that the underwater filming reminds one of The Blue Planet, a nature documentary by BBC. He noted that the purpose of the entire cast seemed to only accompany Kumar's character without engaging in the plot, however he praised Pravesh Rana and Satya Dev. He opined that the film gave Kumar an opportunity to perform differently compared to his recent films which attracted criticism as "public service announcements disguised as motion pictures". He found the background score to be the best in Hindi films this year, but found visual effects and computer graphics questionable. He opined that when one manages to ignore the melodrama, the film would be fun. Nairita Mukherjee of India Today rated the film 2 out of 5 stars and wrote "Ram Setu feels highly underwhelming. It has little or no cinematic appeal. In the end, it is neither funny nor serious". Sanchita Jhunjhunwala of Zoom, rating the film 3 stars, said "The film is based on a premise that is interesting, but feels like a drag every now and then while also seeming too ambitious." Bollywood Hungama rated the film 2.5 out of 5 stars and praised its premise to be interesting and climax to be well executed but criticised the plot and VFX.

Devesh Sharma of Filmfare rated the film 2.5 out of 5 stars and wrote "The film revolves around Akshay Kumar. He has tried his best to be a geeky academic and has vastly underplayed his part". Pratikshya Mishra of The Quint rated the film 2.5 out of 5 stars and wrote "Ram Setu disappoints primarily because of how shoddy the script and its treatment is". Himesh Mankad of Pinkvilla rated the film 2.5 out of 5 stars and wrote "Ram Setu isn't a bad film, but it's not good either – It lies somewhere in between. The subject will have some takers, but we wish, the director had gone wider with his vision by integrating opposition from the natural forces too, and not just stick to the human evils". Renuka Vyavahare of The Times of India rated the film 2 out of 5 stars and wrote "Barring a few decent chase sequences, Ram Setu has no spark and is way too preachy". Nishad Thaivalappil of News 18 rated the film 0.5 out of 5 stars and criticised the film writing that the film has a poor plot-line, VFX and storytelling.

=== Audience reception ===
The word of mouth publicity among the audience did not fare well and led to a lower footfall, causing lower box office collections.

=== Reactions ===
Indian politician Subramanian Swamy stated in August 2022 that he had "through Satya Sabharwal Adv issued Legal Notice to Cine Actor Akshay Kumar (Bhatia) and his 8 others for distorting Ram Setu saga."

Narottam Mishra, Home Minister of Madhya Pradesh, praised the movie stating that the film would reveal the truth about the Ram Setu bridge and said that it was man-made and built during the period of Ramayana.

== See also ==
- Adipurush, 2023 film based on the Ramayana
- Coral reefs in India
- Sethusamudram Shipping Canal Project
