= Sethupathi (disambiguation) =

Sethupathis (lit. 'bridge lord') were 17th century rulers of the Ramnad and Sivaganga regions in southern India.

Sethupathi may also refer to:

- Sethupathi (surname)
- Sethupathi (film), a 2016 Indian Tamil-language film
- Sethupathi Higher Secondary School in Madurai, India
- Sethupathi, a fictional character in the Indian Baahubali franchise

== See also ==
- Sethu (disambiguation)
- Pati (disambiguation)
