= Gobindpur =

Gobindpur may refer to:

- Gobindpur, Jharkhand, a census town in Dhanbad district, Jharkhand state, India
- Gobindpur, Kapurthala, a village in Kapurthala district, Punjab State, India
- Gobindpur, Punjab, a village in Shaheed Bhagat Singh Nagar district, Punjab
- Gobindpur, Khunti, a village in Jharkhand, India
- Gobindpur block, a community development block in Seraikela Kharsawan block in Jharkhand, India
  - Gobindpur, Seraikela Kharsawan, a village in Jharkhand, India

== See also ==
- Govindpur (disambiguation)
- Govindapura (disambiguation)
- Govindapur (disambiguation)
- Gobindapur (disambiguation)
- Chhota Gobindpur, a census town in East Singhbhum district, Jharkhand state, India
