= Govindapura =

Govindapura (Sanskrit) and its derivation in the various languages may refer to:

- Govindpura, Bangalore, a neighborhood in Bangalore
- Govindpura, Bhopal
- Gobindpur, Jharkhand
- Gobindapur, Kolkata
- Govindpur, Prayag
- Govindpur, Madhya Pradesh a place near Gwalior, Madhya Pradesh
- Govindpura, Pakistan
- Govindapuram, Kozhikode, Kerala,
- Govindapuram, Andhra Pradesh
- Govindapuram, Palakkad, Kerala
- Govindapuram, Ariyalur, Tamil Nadu
- Govindapuram, Thanjavur district
- Govindpura, Pakistan

== See also ==
- Govindpur (disambiguation)
- Govindapur (disambiguation)
- Gobindapur (disambiguation)
- Gobindpur (disambiguation)
