= Govindpur =

Govindpur may refer to:

== Places in India ==
- Govindpur, Bihar, a village in Nawada district, Bihar
- Govindpur Jhakhraha, a village in Vaishali district, Bihar
- Govindpur (community development block), in Dhanbad district, Jharkhand
  - Govindpur, Jharkhand, a census town in Dhanbad district, Jharkhand
    - Govindpur Area, an operational area of BCCL in Dhanbad district, Jharkhand
    - Govindpur railway station
- Gobindpur, Khunti, a town in Khunti district, Jharkhand
- Govindpur, a village panchayat in Cuttack district, Odisha; see Salepur (Odisha Vidhan Sabha constituency)
- Govindpur, Allahabad, a neighbourhood in Allahabad city, Uttar Pradesh
- Govindpur, Ballia, a village of Ballia district, Uttar Pradesh

== Other places ==
- Govindpur Taregana, a village development committee in Siraha District, Sagarmatha Zone, Nepal

== See also ==
- Govindpura (disambiguation)
- Gobindpur (disambiguation)
- Gobindapur (disambiguation)
- Govindapur (disambiguation)
- Govindapura (disambiguation)
- Govindpuri, residential Colony in Delhi, India
  - Govindpuri metro station
  - Govindpuri blast, 2005 Delhi bombings
