= Govindpura =

Govindapura may refer to:

- Govindpura, Pakistan, a village
- Govindpura, Bhopal, an urban locality in India
  - Govindpura Assembly constituency

== See also ==
- Govindapura (disambiguation)
