= Gobindapur =

Gobindapur may refer to several places:

== India ==
- Gobindapur, Kolkata, one of the three villages that were merged to form Calcutta
- Govindpur, Allahabad
- Gobindapur, Bhangar, a census town in South 24 Parganas, West Bengal, India
- Gobindapur, Jaynagar

== Bangladesh ==
- Arazi Gobindapur, a village in Jhalokati District, Bangladesh
- Gobindapur Union, Bangladesh
- Gobindapur, Barisal, village in Bangladesh

== See also ==
- Govindpur (disambiguation)
- Govindapura (disambiguation)
- Govindapur (disambiguation)
- Gobindpur (disambiguation)
