= Amara Kaaviyam (soundtrack) =

Soundtrack album by Ghibran
- Released: 27 June 2014
- Genre: Feature film soundtrack
- Length: 27:32
- Language: Tamil
- Label: Sony Music
- Producer: Ghibran

Ghibran chronology
| Run Raja Run (2014) | Amara Kaaviyam (2014) | Jil (2015) |

Amara Kaaviyam (2014) is the soundtrack album to the 2014 film of the same name directed by Jeeva Shankar. The film's musical score is composed by Ghibran and featured six songs with lyrics written by Madhan Karky, Parvathy, P. Vetriselvan and Asmin. The soundtrack was released through Sony Music on 27 June 2014 to positive reviews from critics.

== Development ==
Initially, Yuvan Shankar Raja was announced as the music composer, when the film was under production with Escape Artists Motion Pictures, before being dropped. When the project was revived with the actor and production house being changed, Ghibran was brought in to replace Yuvan as the composer. Jeeva Shankar told Ghibran that he wanted five melodious songs "that capture the spirit of young romance". Since the film was set in 1988–89, the director had wanted an 80s feel to the songs but Ghibran suggested a more contemporary sound, which, he felt, would appeal to modern-day audiences. Ghibran stated that there would be "subtle references" to the music of the period the film is set in, especially in the use of instruments. He also says he has used music bridges as the director had not placed any restriction on the length of the songs.

As the film depicts the journey of two characters, and different stages of love, Ghibran had to complement each stage of the film through its music. Barring K. S. Chithra, no singers from the 1980s recorded vocals for the songs as the voices had to match the two young leads, and since the film was about the journey of the two characters, the voices "mature as the film progresses". The song "Mounam Pesum" marked Ghibran's first collaboration with Chithra, which was one of his favorite songs from the film. The song utilizes piano and classical guitar notes in the interlude, and with Ghibran being a fan of string instruments, he used the opportunity to utilize strings and orchestra. Jeeva also encouraged on using the orchestration of string instruments and provided him creative freedom, as according to Ghibran, "if it had been some other filmmaker, the orchestration of string instruments would have sounded odd."

While most of the film's music featured strings and orchestra, Ghibran used electronic sounds for "Saridhaana Saridhaana" as they wanted schoolchildren and young adults to relate to it. Madhan Karky initially wrote the song using a tape cassette with the word "Olinaada", but as the mentality of a teenager in love is much same across generation, he wanted the words to be appealing, which resulted in Karky rewriting the words that reflect the confusions of a teenager. The song marked the debut of independent R&B singer-songwriter Thomson Andrews in the Tamil music scene.

== Release ==
The film's music rights were acquired by Sony Music India and the final mixing was held on mid-June 2014, with the album planning to be released the month end. It was released on 27 June 2014 at a launch event held at Sathyam Cinemas in Chennai. The album was unveiled by actresses Trisha Krishnan and Nayantara while director Bala and actresses Pooja Umashankar, Lekha Washington and Rupa Manjari were also present.

== Reception ==
The album received high praise from critics. The Times of India wrote, "This is an album that you will instantly take to and it is only going to grow on you even better, especially if you are in love. It is sure to figure in the Top 5 of the year's best film album". A reviewer from Sify wrote, "Ghibran shoulders the movie by delivering his career best soundtrack and his re-recording is very refreshing too". Karthik Srinivasan of Milliblog wrote "The complex and enticing multi-layered sound of Ghibran is reminiscent of early Rahman. And the man seems to be clearly on a roll, ostensibly adept at churning this with alarming consistency!" Sudhir Srinivasan of The Hindu wrote "Composer Ghibran's lush music carries the film". S. Saraswathi of Rediff.com wrote "The haunting BGM and some exquisite melodies make Amara Kaaviyam one of Ghibran’s best so far. Edhedho Ennamvandhu and Mounam Pesum by the legendary Chithra are the pick of the lot."

Ghibran anticipated on Amara Kaaviyam being commercially successful, as he believed that a success of a film affects any creator. However, the film underperformed at the box-office, which Ghibran noted "I thought the film’s failure would affect me badly. But it didn’t, even though it came as a rude shock. I must have matured, I guess." He still considers Amara Kaaviyam as one of his favorite albums.

== Track listing ==
| No. | Title | Lyrics | Singer(s) | Length |
|---|---|---|---|---|
| 1. | "Saridhaana Saridhaana" | Madhan Karky | Yazin Nizar, Thomson Andrews, Ghibran | 4:28 |
| 2. | "Edhedho Ennamvandhu" | Parvathy | Haricharan, Padmalatha | 4:51 |
| 3. | "Mounam Pesum" | P. Vetriselvan | K. S. Chithra, Sowmya Mahadevan | 4:41 |
| 4. | "Dheva Dhevadhai" | P. Vetriselvan | Ranjith, Madhu Iyer | 4:18 |
| 5. | "Thaagam Theerea" | Asmin | Yazin Nizar, Padmalatha | 4:33 |
| 6. | "Edhedho Ennamvandhu (Solo)" | Parvathy | Sundar Narayana Rao | 4:51 |
| Total length: | | | | 27:32 |
