= The Race of My Life =

Autobiography by Milkha Singh

The Race of My Life: An Autobiography
- Coverage page of The Race of My Life
- Author: Milkha Singh with Sonia Sanwalka
- Language: Hindi
- Subject: Indian Athlete
- Genre: autobiography
- Published: 2013 by Rupa Publications
- Publication place: India
- Pages: 160 pp (first edition)
- ISBN: 8129129108
- OCLC: 857897315

The Race of My Life: An Autobiography is the autobiography of Indian athlete Milkha Singh, coauthored with daughter Sonia Sanwalka. The film Bhaag Milkha Bhaag is based on it.

== Summary ==
Milkha Singh, a sikh boy born around 1930s, (Note: There are different records for his birth date. Records in Pakistan note it as 20 November 1929. Other records note it as 17 October 1935 and 20 November 1935. The birthdate is written 20 November 1932, on his passport.) runs against trains for fun. A lot of his family members who belong to Milkha Singh family, including his parents, are killed in the Partition of India. After many attempts, he is finally able to join the Indian army. Whilst in the army, his athletic skills show. He wins gold medals in the 1958 Asian Games and 1958 Commonwealth Games. After winning the friendly race between India and Pakistan, in 1960, he earns the title of The Flying Sikh by Ayub Khan. However, he loses the bronze medal by fraction of a second at the 1960 Summer Olympics, due to a judgement error on the race track. In 1963, he marries his longtime love Nirmal Kaur, former captain of India's women's volleyball team. In 1971, their son Jeev Milkha Singh is born. Jeev, also a sportsman, became a world class golfer.

== Bhaag Milkha Bhaag ==
Singh said that after reading his autobiography, a few Bollywood directors approached him, asking to make a film on his life. Singh's son, Jeev Milkha Singh, decided that the film rights be given to Rakeysh Omprakash Mehra. Singh sold the rights for ₹1, with a clause that 10-15% of the film's profits would be donated to his charitable trust.

Farhan Akhtar starred as Singh, and Sonam Kapoor starred as Biro. Made on a budget of ₹30 crore, Bhaag Milkha Bhaag grossed ₹164 crore worldwide. It was one of the highest grossing 2013 Bollywood films.

Of the film and Akhtar's portrayal of him, Singh said "Farhan Akhtar has done a brilliant job. He looked like my duplicate in the movie. The director, too, did a great a job. Also, the dialogues and the lyrics by Prasoon Joshi are brilliant. There was nothing which I felt should be changed in the movie, it was perfect."

== Reception ==
IBN Live panned The Race of My Life as disappointing, as they felt that it was "nothing but part of a deal for the movie's production."
