= Tourism in Vizianagaram =

Vizianagaram is a city in the Indian state of Andhra Pradesh. The city and its region contain natural features such as beaches along the Bay of Bengal coast, historic forts, temples as well as landmarks in the city itself. Heritage-tourism is supported by the presence of historic forts. The Andhra Pradesh Tourism Development Corporation is the state tourism department, responsible for maintaining, promoting and developing the tourism sector.

== Government initiatives ==
=== Photo Contest ===
Photo Contest is an initiative by Andhra Pradesh Tourism Department which is open for all natives of Andhra Pradesh and Tourists to the State, for participation, to encourage the tourism. Participants can send their original photographs which relate to Heritage, Scenic, Religious, Cultural, Wildlife or any other Tourism sector in Andhra Pradesh. These photographs are used on the website of Andhra Pradesh Tourism Department to promote Tourism. Participants are encouraged to submit, by providing prizes every month.

== Forts and landmarks ==
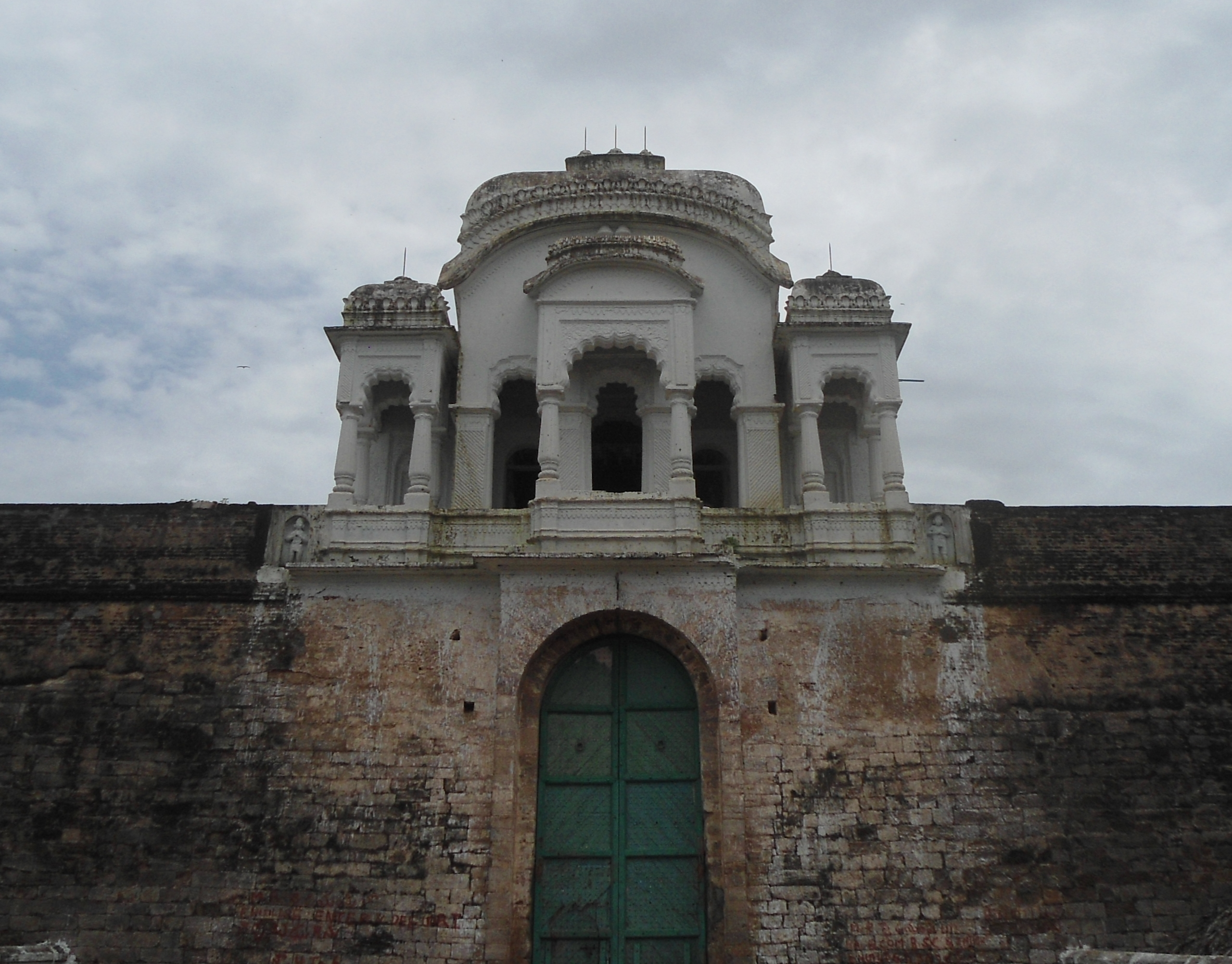
West Entrance of the Vizianagaram fort in Andhra Pradesh

- Bobbili fort is situated in the ancient town of Bobbili. It is associated with the historic battle of Bobbili between the Raja of Bobbili and the Zamindar of Vizianagaram, who was aided by the French. The fierce battle also has significant cultural impact due to the sacrifices, bravery, valour and courage of people involved and it has since become a subject of folklore establishing it as a land of heroism. The impressive Bobbili fort stands as a silent testimony to this hard fought battle which saw the Raja of Bobbili die fighting rather than surrendering.
- Vizianagaram Fort
- Ponduru

== Temples ==
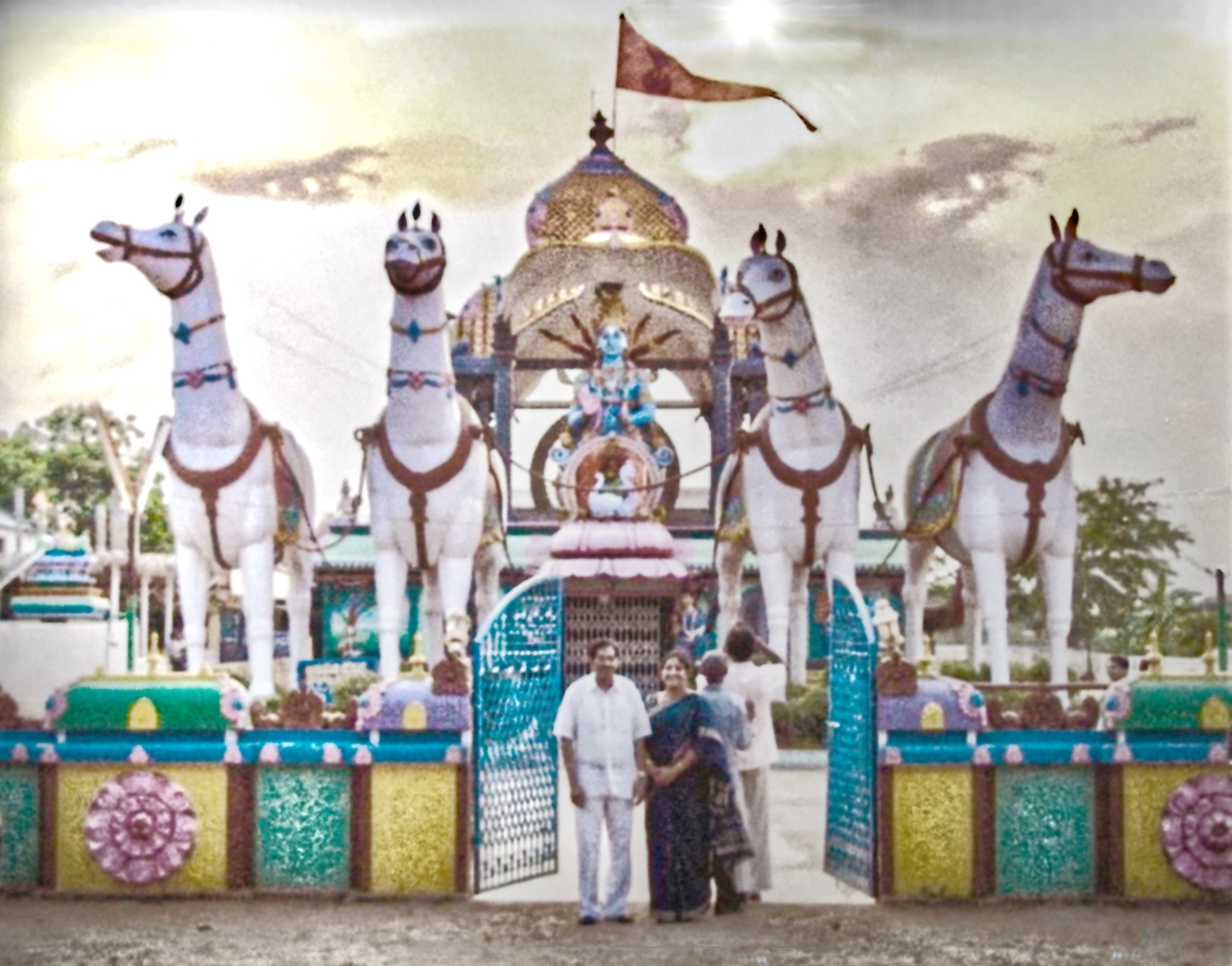
Entrance of Govindapuram Temple

There are a number of temples located in Vizianagaram.

- Govindapuram Temple
- Jami Vruksham
- Kumili Temple
- Punyagiri temple
- Pydithalli Ammavari Temple
- Ramatheertham Ramatheertham is famous for the ancient temple of Ramachandra Swamy. Along with the statues and idols of Ramachandra Swamy, idols of Sita, wife of Ramachandra swamy, and Lakshamana, brother of Ramachandra swamy, covered in silver plating can be seen. This temple attracts huge crowds of devotees during the festival seasons of Sri Ramanavami and Vaikuntha Ekadasi.
- Venu Gopala Swamy Temple
