= Bhaag Milkha Bhaag (soundtrack) =

Soundtrack album by Shankar–Ehsaan–Loy

Soundtrack album to Bhaag Milkha Bhaag by Shankar–Ehsaan–Loy
- Released: 14 June 2013
- Recorded: 2012–2013
- Genre: Feature film soundtrack
- Length: 35:29
- Languages: Hindi; Punjabi
- Label: Sony Music India
- Producer: Shankar–Ehsaan–Loy

Shankar–Ehsaan–Loy chronology
Vishwaroopam (2012)	Bhaag Milkha Bhaag (2013)	D-Day (2013)

Singles from Bhaag Milkha Bhaag
- 1. "Zinda" Released: 23 May 2013

Bhaag Milkha Bhaag is the soundtrack album, by Shankar–Ehsaan–Loy, to the 2013 Hindi film of the same name, directed by Rakeysh Omprakash Mehra that stars Farhan Akhtar and Sonam Kapoor in the lead roles. The album features eight tracks, and was released digitally on 14 June 2013.

== Development ==
A.R. Rahman was expected to compose the soundtrack for the film as with the previous two films of Mehra. But due to Rahman's packed schedules he turned down the film and Mehra opted for Shankar–Ehsaan–Loy trio with whom he had collaborated before for various other projects. The reunion took place while Mehra visited the Kingdom of Dreams, where the trio had performed, and they brainstormed back at the hotel and came up with ideas for the music for the film.

The music rights were sold to Sony Music, who had produced the soundtrack to Mehra's earlier film Rang De Basanti.

== Release ==
The soundtrack was initially planned to be released on 21 June. However, due to increasing demand of the fans after the promos, Sony Music and ROMP decided to release the music online digitally a week before on 14 June. The album was officially launched later on 19 June, along with the film's theatrical trailer. The function was attended by Milkha Singh and the film's stars, Farhan Akhtar and Sonam Kapoor.

== Track listing ==
All lyrics are written by Prasoon Joshi.

No.	Title	Singer(s)	Length
1.	"Gurbani"	Daler Mehndi	1:40
2.	"Zinda"	Siddharth Mahadevan	3:31
3.	"Mera Yaar"	Javed Bashir	5:51
4.	"Maston Ka Jhund"	Divya Kumar	4:34
5.	"Bhaag Milkha Bhaag"	Arif Lohar	4:29
6.	"Slow Motion Angreza"	Sukhwinder Singh, Shankar Mahadevan, Loy Mendonsa	4:20
7.	"O Rangrez"	Shreya Ghoshal, Javed Bashir	6:25
8.	"Bhaag Milkha Bhaag (Rock Version)"	Siddharth Mahadevan	4:39
Total length:			35:29

== Reception ==
Professional ratings
Review scores
Source	Rating
Movie Talkies	3.5/5 stars
Music Aloud	7.5/10 stars
Mumbai Mirror	3.5/5 stars
Filmfare	3/5 stars

=== Critical reception ===
The album received critical acclaim upon release. Joginder Tuteja of Movie Talkies gave the album three and a half stars, stating "Bhaag Milkha Bhaag is a very good album and it wins on quite a few accounts, especially in the fact that it never loses sight of the film's theme. Moreover, Shankar-Ehsaan-Loy, who had not been in the Bollywood scheme of things for a while, return with a bang and demonstrate how they cannot be away from the scene for long.He also said that this album is not better than Mehra's previous movies Rang De Basanti and Delhi 6." Karthik Srinivasan of Milliblog!, in his 200 words review, stated "The Amar-Akbar-Antony of Indian music open their 2013 account in style!"

Mumbai Mirror's verdict said, "Whipping up a delectable blend of lingering sounds and moods, Shankar-Ehsaan-Loy once again show how a nuanced, unconventional approach can work wonders!" Rohwit of Time Out Mumbai described the album as " a brilliant album with the right amount of adrenalin and love."

Filmfare 's Devesh Sharma, in his four star review, stated, "..[Shankar–Ehsaan–Loy] have connected well with Mehra's musical's sensibilities and have given us a score that stands true to the film's subject and is pleasing to the ears at the same time".

IANS review stated, "Shankar, Ehsaan and Loy have tried to infuse life and story in every track. While the tracks, which are peppy, score high, certain tracks may fail to meet expectations of the listeners."

=== Chart performance ===
The music topped the charts, with the album leaping to #1 position in ITunes Store,. while the track "Zinda" topped the songs chart.

== Album credits ==
Backing Vocals

Mani Mahadevan, Raman Mahadevan, Suhas Sawant, Loy Mendonsa, Suzanne D'Mello, Keshia Braganza, Thomson Andrews, Leon D'Souza, Gwen Diaz, Rakeysh Omprakash Mehra, Prasoon Joshi, Shankar Mahadevan.

Personnel:

- Vocal percussion: Taufiq Qureshi
- Drums: Jai Row Kavi, Gino Banks, Darshan Doshi
- Guitars: Ehsaan Noorani, Kuber Sharma (Djent Guitar) Rushad Mistry (Bass), Adi Mistry (Bass)
- Bouzouki, Banjo & Mandolin: Tapas Roy
- Tabla: Sanjay Vyas
- Dholak: Yusuf Mohammad, Wajid Ali
- Israj: Arshad Khan
- Album Mixing and Mastering: Ashish Manchanda
