= Bhaag Milkha Bhaag =

2013 Indian film by Rakeysh Omprakash Mehra

- Theatrical release poster
- Directed by: Rakeysh Omprakash Mehra
- Written by: Prasoon Joshi
- Based on: The Race of My Life by Milkha Singh and Sonia Sanwalka
- Produced by: Rajiv Tandon; Sudhanshu Vats; Raghav Bahl; Maitrayee Dasgupta; P. S. Bharathi
- Starring: Farhan Akhtar
- Cinematography: Binod Pradhan
- Edited by: P. S. Bharathi
- Music by: Songs: Shankar–Ehsaan–Loy; Background Score: Shankar–Ehsaan–Loy; Indrajit Sharma (Tubby)
- Production company: Rakeysh Omprakash Mehra Pictures
- Distributed by: Viacom18 Motion Pictures
- Release date: 12 July 2013
- Running time: 186 minutes
- Country: India
- Language: Hindi
- Budget: ₹410 million
- Box office: est. ₹2.1 billion

Bhaag Milkha Bhaag (Note: Source:; Abbreviated as BMB.) (transl. Run, Milkha, Run) is a 2013 Indian Hindi-language biographical sports drama film directed by Rakeysh Omprakash Mehra, written by lyricist Prasoon Joshi, and produced by Viacom 18 Motion Pictures in association with Rajiv Tandon and editor P.S. Bharathi under the ROMP Pictures banner. Based on the life of Milkha Singh, an Indian athlete and Olympian who was a champion of the Commonwealth Games and two-time 400m champion of the Asian Games, it stars Farhan Akhtar in the title role alongside Art Malik, Divya Dutta, Pavan Malhotra, Yograj Singh, Prakash Raj and Meesha Shafi in supporting roles with Sonam Kapoor in a special appearance.

Made on a budget of ₹410 million (US$4.3 million), the film, shot by Binod Pradhan and scored by musician trio Shankar-Ehsaan-Loy, was released on 12 July 2013 and garnered acclaim from critics and audiences alike. It performed very well at the box office, eventually being declared a "super hit" domestically as well as a hit overseas. Bhaag Milkha Bhaag is the eighth highest-grossing 2013 Bollywood film worldwide and became the 21st film to gross ₹1 billion (US$10 million).

Bhaag Milkha Bhaag was inspired by The Race of My Life, an autobiography co-written by Singh and his daughter, Sonia Sanwalka. Singh sold the film rights for one rupee and inserted a clause stating that a share of the profits would be given to the Milkha Singh Charitable Trust, which was founded in 2003 with the aim of assisting poor and needy sportspeople.

== Plot ==
The narrative opens at the 1960 Summer Olympics in Rome, where Indian sprinter Milkha Singh is competing in the 400-meter finals. As the race begins, his coach shouts the phrase, "Bhaag Milkha Bhaag!" ("Run Milkha Run!"). The words trigger a severe traumatic flashback, causing Milkha to lose focus and finish in a disappointing fourth place. These haunting memories date back to the 1947 Partition of India, during which mass sectarian violence erupted in Punjab, culminating in the massacre of Milkha’s parents before his eyes. As a young boy, Milkha escaped the carnage and arrived in Delhi as a penniless refugee, eventually reuniting with his sister, Isri Kaur. Living in squalid refugee camps, he turned to petty theft to survive alongside a group of friends. Upon reaching adulthood, Milkha fell in love with a local woman named Biro, who urged him to abandon his life of crime and live with honesty.

Seeking a structured future and a legitimate livelihood, Milkha enlists in the Indian Army. During basic training, he enters a cross-country race where the top ten finishers are promised milk, eggs, and an exemption from daily fatigue duties. His raw athletic prowess catches the eye of Havaldar Gurudev Singh, who begins mentoring him for national athletic selections. As Milkha rapidly ascends the ranks, his success breeds intense jealousy among senior athletes. The night before the final Olympic trials, these rivals brutally assault him. Despite sustaining severe internal injuries, Milkha insists on competing the following day. Overcoming intense physical agony, he wins the race and shatters the national 400-meter record. Eager to share his success, Milkha returns to Delhi to propose to Biro, only to discover that she was married off and had left the city during his absence.

At the 1956 Summer Olympics in Melbourne, a distracted Milkha becomes infatuated with Stella, the granddaughter of his Australian technical coach. After spending a night drinking at a bar, the two have a one-night stand. Exhausted and arriving late to training the next morning, Milkha performs poorly and fails to qualify in the final Olympic race. Devastated by his lack of discipline, he undergoes a crisis of conscience, physically punishing himself in front of a mirror. On the flight back to India, he asks his coach for the official 400-meter world record time and learns it stands at 45.9 seconds. Driven by a newfound obsession, Milkha undergoes grueling high-altitude tire training in the freezing deserts of Ladakh, pushing his body to absolute physical exhaustion.

He enters the 1958 Asian Games in Tokyo, where he encounters Pakistan’s star sprinter, Abdul Khaliq, hailed as the "Fastest Man of Asia." Although initially dismissed by the Pakistani athletic contingent, Milkha comfortably defeats Khaliq in the 200-meter event, securing the Gold medal. He continues his dominant streak at the Commonwealth Games in Cardiff, winning another Gold in the 400-meter race, earning international acclaim as "The King of England" from the British press. Having finally broken the 400-meter world record during his training cycle, Milkha celebrates with his military comrades and symbolically burns the paper on which he had inscribed the 45.9-second target, signaling the fulfillment of his athletic goal.

Years later, Prime Minister Jawaharlal Nehru invites Milkha to lead the Indian athletic contingent to Pakistan for a highly publicized, friendly dual meet against Abdul Khaliq. Deeply traumatized by his childhood flight from his birthplace, Milkha adamantly refuses to return to Pakistani soil. However, Nehru personally intervenes and convinces him to go for national prestige. Upon arriving in Pakistan, Milkha skips the official press conferences to visit his ancestral village. There, he confronts the exact site of his parents’ murder and remembers his father's final, desperate shout to save his life: "Bhaag Milkha Bhaag!" Overcome with grief, he is comforted by his childhood friend, Sampreet, and Sampreet's young son.

During the highly anticipated race in Lahore, Khaliq takes an early lead, but Milkha steadily accelerates, overtaking his opponents one by one to secure a historic victory by a massive margin. Deeply impressed by his unparalleled speed and grace, the President of Pakistan, General Ayub Khan, bestows upon him the immortal title of "The Flying Sikh." At Milkha's personal request, Prime Minister Nehru declares a national holiday in India to celebrate the triumph. The film concludes with Milkha Singh conducting a triumphant victory lap before an adoring stadium, momentarily looking back to see a vision of his younger, childhood self running joyfully alongside him.

== Cast ==
- Farhan Akhtar as Subedar Milkha Singh
  - Japtej Singh as young Milkha
- Art Malik as Sampooran Singh, Milkha's father
- Divya Dutta as Isri Kaur, Milkha's elder sister
- Pavan Malhotra as Havaldar Gurdev Singh, Milkha's coach during his days in the Indian Army
- Yograj Singh as Ranbir Singh, Milkha's coach
- Prakash Raj as Subedar Veerapandian
- K.K.Raina as Mr. Wadhwa
- Meesha Shafi as Perizaad
- Rebecca Breeds as Stella
- Dalip Tahil as Jawaharlal Nehru
- Shanta Kumar as Gen. Ayub Khan
- Dev Gill as Abdul Khaliq
- Nawab Shah as Khaliq's coach
- Jass Bhatia as Mahinder
- Salim Zaidi as Pakistani reporter
- Sumit Gulati as Suresh Kumar
- Herry Tangri as Milkha's Friend in the army
- Mahendra Mewati as Kirpal Singh
- Rupinder Singh athletics consultant
- Sahidur Rehman as Sher Singh Rana
- Chandan Singh Gill as Sampreet Singh, Milkha's childhood friend
- Sonam Kapoor as Biro Kaur, Milkha's fleeting love interest (special appearance)
- Rakeysh Omprakash Mehra as a pilot (special appearance)
- Loy Mendonsa in a special appearance as the country singer in the song "Slow Motion Angreza"
- Shriswara as Nirmal Saini (deleted scenes)

== Production ==
=== Development ===
After the release of Delhi-6 (2009), director Rakeysh Omprakash Mehra started developing two projects: a historical love story, Mirza Sahiban, and a biopic of Milkha Singh. He chose the latter as it had developed better. Prasoon Joshi, who co-wrote Delhi-6 with Mehra, started working on the script. Joshi later clarified that the film's title, Bhaag Milkha Bhaag (Run Milkha Run) was never actually spoken by Milkha's father. Rather, it was a phrase coined by him and was used liberally throughout the narrative.

"This film is not a mirror of Milkha Singh's life. It is an interpretation of his life."

— Prasoon Joshi (screenwriter)

Growing up in Delhi, Mehra was familiar with anecdotes from the life of Milkha Singh, the ace runner popular as the "Flying Sikh". He used to visit the National Stadium, Delhi for swimming, where Singh also came for his practice. Gradually, he learns details regarding his early life, including how he witnessed his entire family being killed during the Partition and travelled alone to Delhi as a refugee. Mehra started developing the project as a personal story rather than a sports film, taking the theme of "zindagi se bhago nahin, zindagi ke saath bhago" ("don't run away from life, run with life"), depicting his life from 13 to 28 years.

For research, he visited Chandigarh several times, where he talked for hours with Singh. Milkha Singh's son, Jeev Milkha Singh, a notable golfer in his own right, arranged his meetings with the family members. Milkha Singh refused a large offer for the film rights to his story and instead charged a token amount of ₹1 (1.0¢ US), as he believed if the film could "inspire our young people and result in India's first Olympic track gold, that would [be] reward enough for him."

It took the next two and half years to write the story. According to the director, it is not a sports film, but a film about human spirit.

=== Casting ===
In 2010, early contenders of the lead role were Abhishek Bachchan and Akshay Kumar. While Bachchan was preferred by Mehra, Kumar was preferred by Milkha Singh himself. First the script went to Akshay Kumar, who declined as he was more interested in doing Once Upon ay Time in Mumbai Dobaara!, but however later regretted the decision for passing the film on. Mehra deferred the final decision on the cast till the final script was completed. Mehra offered the film to Hrithik Roshan, Aamir Khan, and Ranveer Singh, all of whom turned it down. After months of searching, in September 2011, the principal cast were announced. Actor-director Farhan Akhtar and actress Sonam Kapoor received the lead roles. Thereafter, Akhtar visited Punjab to meet Milkha Singh and his family. Before deciding, Akhtar met Mehra once for a story session and immediately agreed to play the role, which marked his first appearance outside a home production. He was inspired by Milkha Singh's life and underwent extensive physical training for the role.

Pakistani actress and singer, Meesha Shafi—who rose to fame with her song "Alif Allah (Jugni)", played RAW agent in the hit Pakistani film Waar, and in 2013 made her Hollywood debut with The Reluctant Fundamentalist—was selected for the role of Perizaad, Singh's friend and a swimmer for team India.

=== Filming ===
The principal photography commenced in February 2012 and mainly took place in Punjab, India, with some scenes shot in Delhi, Tokyo, Melbourne, and Rome.

International company ReelSports coordinated the sports action for Bhaag Milkha Bhaag and cast all the elite runners.

== Soundtrack ==
The music and the background score were composed by Shankar–Ehsaan–Loy, their first film collaboration with Rakeysh Omprakash Mehra. The soundtrack features seven tracks with lyrics written by Prasoon Joshi. The audio was released by Sony Music on 14 June 2013, on digital platforms including iTunes and Amazon.

== Release ==
Bhaag Milkha Bhaag's teaser trailer was released along with Yeh Jawaani Hai Deewani, which released on 31 May 2013.

Bhaag Milkha Bhaag released on 12 July 2013 in 1200 screens worldwide including 140 screens in USA.

That summer, the film received various tax exemptions from Indian state governments:

- On July 20, the governments of Maharashtra and Madhya Pradesh granted an entertainment tax exemption to Bhaag Milkha Bhaag.
- On July 24, the Delhi government also announced a tax exemption.
- On July 25, Goa's government gave tax-free status to the film for three months.
- On July 29, the Haryana government made the film tax-free in the state.
- On August 1, Uttar Pradesh government approved a proposal to exempt Bhaag Milkha Bhaag from entertainment tax in two instalments or for a maximum of two months.

Farhan Akhtar and director Rakeysh Omprakash Mehra launched the film's official mobile game at the Reliance Digital electronics store in Times Square on 3 August 2013.

The film was banned by the Pakistan Central Board of Film Censors for depicting the sports governing bodies (cf. Pakistan Sports Board, Athletics Federation of Pakistan) in a negative light by showing them using unfair means.

== Critical response ==
=== India ===
The film received mostly positive reviews from critics domestically.

Bollywood Hungama's Taran Adarsh predicted that it would "win accolades, admiration, respect and esteem, besides emerging as a champ", while Emirates 24/7 's Sneha May Francis gave a thumbs up, saying that the film is "truly epic" and that "despite the prestigious Olympic glory eluding him, Mehra deservedly honors the runner's other victories and impeccable talent, allowing us to applaud the prodigy." Desimartini, with almost 5000 ratings by the end of the weekend, stated the following: "Superbly directed, Bhaag Milkha Bhaag is an outstanding film with an incredible performance by Farhan Akhtar. Though long, it keeps you hooked throughout. Don't miss this patriotic tribute to Milkha Singh."

Madhureeta Mukherjee of The Times of India stated, "While you are on-the-run, pause to watch this one." The India Today review concluded, "Go and run with Milkha. In this fast-paced life, this race will definitely soothe your senses." Sify's Vijay Sinha praised the film, judging "Bhaag Milkha Bhaag should get even drug-addled Punjab flocking to the cinemas." Gayatri Sankar of Zee News wrote, "If you are a patriotic Indian, you will be left teary-eyed and your head held high." Yahoo! Movies' review summed up, "Mehra has helmed 'Bhaag Milkha Bhaag' into a compelling story and an exemplar of cinematic brilliance; that it is also an inspiring tale almost seems to be a by-product."

Aseem Chhabra of Rediff.com gave a mixed review and reasoned that film does not offer anything new. However, he praised Akhtar's performance, writing "If there is one reason to see BMB it is to watch Akhtar – how much he has evolved as an actor and the sincerity with which he immerses himself in the character." NDTV echoed the same sentiment, "Bhaag Milkha Singh is a 400 meters sprint that feels like a cross-country race." Despite praising the technical aspects and music, Rajeev Masand of CNN-IBN criticised the length: "The film itself is well intentioned and shines a light on an important figure. The film is an ambitious account of the first 27 years or so of celebrated Indian sprinter Milkha Singh's roller-coaster life. But it's too long and too unfocused to leave a lasting impression."

Actor Hrithik Roshan praised Akhtar's performance and deemed the film to be "phenomenal." Veteran actor Amitabh Bachchan highly praised it on his blog, describing it as "too emotionally and creatively moving to put anything down in words."

=== International ===
American athlete Carl Lewis watched Bhaag Milkha Bhaag in the US and called Milkha Singh in India to express his appreciation for the film and the athlete.

Robert Abele of the Los Angeles Times described the film as "a stirring bio of Milkha Singh", as well as stating that there's enough dramatic restraint and performance charm to give Singh his due as a justifiably glorified figure in post-independence India.

Nicolas Rapold of The New York Times said that "the movie strikes its chosen couple of notes resoundingly, making clear what makes Singh run." Twitch Film's review said that, "in the grand scheme of things, Bhaag Milkha Bhaag is easily one of the best mainstream films to come out of Bollywood this year." Scott Foundas of Variety described it as a "rousing and handsomely crafted biopic". Lisa Tsering of The Hollywood Reporter opined that the biopic "requires viewer endurance, but pays off with an exhilarating climax." Digital Spy praised the work and said, "It is a blessing that this film was made and the inspiring story of India's greatest sporting hero told to a generation who might otherwise never have known the legend of 'The Flying Sikh.'"

The Washington Post stated that the Bollywood import dramatises the life of famed Indian sprinter Milkha Singh.

== Box office ==
Bhaag Milkha Bhaag grossed ₹2.1 billion (US$22 million) worldwide and is the fifth highest-grossing 2013 Bollywood film.

=== India ===
In India, the film has netted a total ₹1,091,850,000 (US$11 million).

The film opened very well at multiplexes across India, especially in Punjab and Delhi. The film:

- earned approximately ₹85 million (US$880,000) on its first day, and showed a 21% growth on the second day of its box office run, earning ₹105 million (US$1.1 million).
- grossed approximately ₹317 million (US$3.3 million) nett over its first weekend, and earned a total of ₹55 million (US$570,000) nett on Monday.
- grossed ₹365 million (US$3.8 million) nett over its first four days.
- ended its first week with a total collection of approximately ₹535 million (US$5.6 million) nett.
- collected around ₹35 million (US$360,000) nett on its eighth day.
- collected ₹55 million (US$570,000) nett on its second Saturday.
- earned approximately ₹695 million (US$7.2 million) nett over a ten-day period.
- grossed around ₹279.80 million (US$2.9 million) nett in its second week taking its total collections to ₹810 million (US$8.4 million).
- grossed over ₹900 million (US$9.3 million) nett in 17 days as it grossed around ₹95 million (US$990,000) nett in its third weekend.
- added ₹15 million (US$160,000) nett approx in its third week to take its nett gross to ₹964 million (US$10 million).
- grossed ₹1.02 billion (US$11 million) nett in 24 days as it added around ₹50 million (US$520,000) nett in its fourth weekend.

=== Overseas ===
Bhaag Milkha Bhaag grossed around $1.4 million over its first weekend overseas. The film grossed US$647,112 in its first week of release in the United States, and debuted at the 15th spot at the box office. It has done well overseas with collections of around $2.7 million. The film has done well in US. It has done overseas business of over US$3.5 million and has been declared a hit. The final overseas business is around US$3.8 million.

== Controversy ==
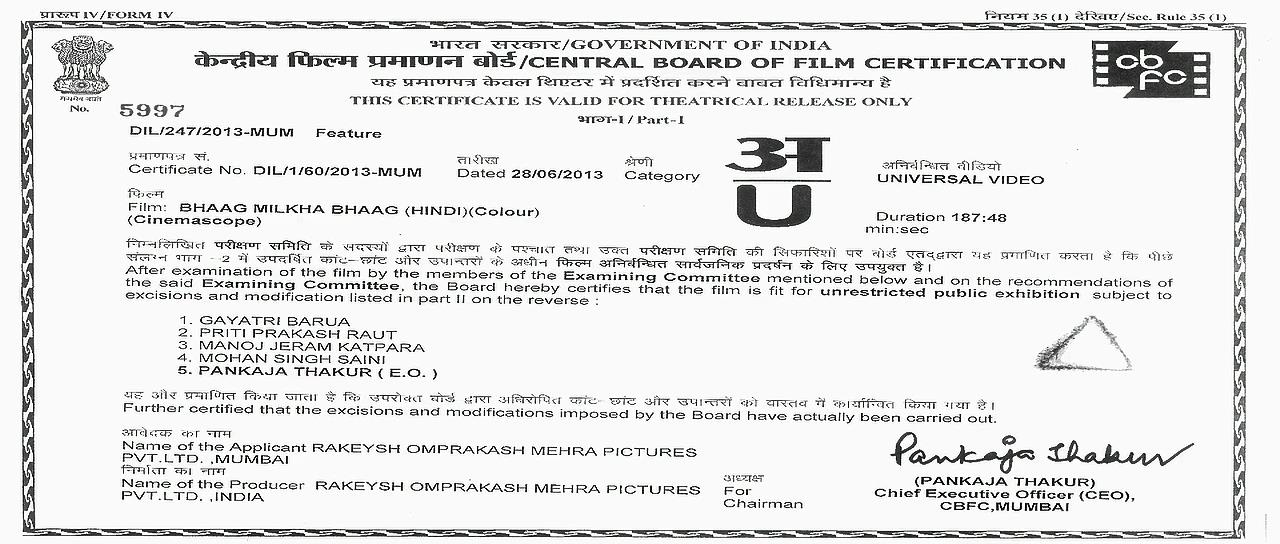
Bhaag Milkha Bhaag CBFC certificate showing the "U" for Universal Certification

Certain members of the Central Board of Film Certification (CBFC) boycotted a workshop held in accordance with the Information and Broadcast Ministry's wish citing partially of some officials of the censor board particularly regarding the certificate given to Bhaag Milkha Bhaag which, in spite of a sex scene and some violence, got a U certificate (Note: "U" means in CFBC terminology unrestricted public exhibition or Universal video, equivalent to MPAA's G and PG ratings and BBFC's U and PG ratings.) lashing out and criticising the decisions of the censor examining member and former actress, Sharmila Tagore accusing CEO Pankaja Thakur along with some other board officials being puppets controlled by film directors and promoting vulgarity.

As a consequence, the Delhi High Court sought an explanation from the I&B ministry and the CBFC regarding the escalating levels of vulgarity in recent times.

== Historical accuracy ==
Although the story mentions that Milkha Singh held the men's 400-meter world record, the men's 400 metres world record progression does not mention Milkha Singh's name in the world record holders. It is shown that Ranbir Singh (Milkha's coach) mentions world record as 45.9 seconds after 1952 Olympics; while Milkha eventually bested that time in the 1956 Olympics with a personal record of 45.73 seconds, the newest world record was 45.2 seconds set by Lou Jones of the United States, the first-place winner in the same race.

Gurbachan Singh Randhawa, renowned athlete, who was part of the Indian team at Rome Olympics mentions that the claim made in the movie about Milkha Singh leading the 400-meter race and he lost it as he looked behind, is incorrect. He never led the race and he was at a fifth position at 300 meters.

== Accolades ==
Award (Note: Awards, festivals and organizations are in alphabetical order.)	Date of ceremony (Note: Date is linked to the article about the awards held that year, wherever possible.)	Category	Recipient(s)	Result	Ref.
Asian Film Awards	27 March 2014	Best Composer	Shankar–Ehsaan–Loy	Nominated	
BIG Star Entertainment Awards	18 December 2013	Most Entertaining Film of the Year	Bhaag Milkha Bhaag	Won	
BIG Star Entertainment Awards	18 December 2013	Most Entertaining Director	Rakeysh Omprakash Mehra	Nominated	
BIG Star Entertainment Awards	18 December 2013	Most Entertaining Actor – Male	Farhan Akhtar	Nominated	
BIG Star Entertainment Awards	18 December 2013	Most Entertaining Singer – Male	Siddharth Mahadevan – (for "Zinda")	Won	
Filmfare Awards	24 January 2014	Best Film	Bhaag Milkha Bhaag	Won	
Filmfare Awards	24 January 2014	Best Director	Rakeysh Omprakash Mehra	Won	
Filmfare Awards	24 January 2014	Best Actor	Farhan Akhtar	Won	
Filmfare Awards	24 January 2014	Best Supporting Actress	Divya Dutta	Nominated	
Filmfare Awards	24 January 2014	Best Lyricist	Prasoon Joshi – (for "Zinda")	Won	
Filmfare Awards	24 January 2014	Best Male Playback Singer	Siddharth Mahadevan – (for "Zinda")	Nominated	
Filmfare Awards	24 January 2014	Best Background Score	Shankar–Ehsaan–Loy & Tubby	Nominated	
Filmfare Awards	24 January 2014	Best Costume Design	Dolly Ahluwalia	Won	
Filmfare Awards	24 January 2014	Best Production Design	Sumit Basu (Acropoliis Design Ltd)	Won	
Filmfare Awards	24 January 2014	Best Special Effects	Firefly Creative Studio, Pixion & Tata Elxsi	Nominated	
Global Indian Music Academy Awards	20 January 2014	Best Film Album	Shankar–Ehsaan–Loy	Nominated	
Global Indian Music Academy Awards	20 January 2014	Best Music Director	Shankar–Ehsaan–Loy	Nominated	
Global Indian Music Academy Awards	20 January 2014	Best Background Score	Shankar–Ehsaan–Loy	Won	
Global Indian Music Academy Awards	20 January 2014	Best Lyricist	Prasoon Joshi – (for "Zinda")	Nominated	
Global Indian Music Academy Awards	20 January 2014	Best Lyricist	Prasoon Joshi – (for "Bhaag Milkha Bhaag")	Nominated	
Global Indian Music Academy Awards	20 January 2014	Best Duet	Shreya Ghoshal & Javed Bashir – (for "O Rangrez")	Nominated	
Global Indian Music Academy Awards	20 January 2014	Best Engineer – Film Album	Ashish Manchanda	Nominated	
International Indian Film Academy Awards	23–26 April 2014	Best Film	Bhaag Milkha Bhaag	Won	
International Indian Film Academy Awards	23–26 April 2014	Best Director	Rakeysh Omprakash Mehra	Won	
International Indian Film Academy Awards	23–26 April 2014	Best Actor	Farhan Akhtar	Won	
International Indian Film Academy Awards	23–26 April 2014	Best Supporting Actor	Pavan Malhotra	Nominated	
International Indian Film Academy Awards	23–26 April 2014	Best Supporting Actress	Divya Dutta	Won	
International Indian Film Academy Awards	23–26 April 2014	Best Music Director	Shankar–Ehsaan–Loy	Nominated	
International Indian Film Academy Awards	23–26 April 2014	Best Background Score	Shankar–Ehsaan–Loy	Won	
International Indian Film Academy Awards	23–26 April 2014	Best Lyricist	Prasoon Joshi – (for "O Rangrez")	Nominated	
International Indian Film Academy Awards	23–26 April 2014	Best Male Playback Singer	Siddharth Mahadevan – (for "Zinda")	Nominated	
International Indian Film Academy Awards	23–26 April 2014	Best Female Playback Singer	Shreya Ghoshal – (for "O Rangrez")	Nominated	
International Indian Film Academy Awards	23–26 April 2014	Best Story	Prasoon Joshi	Won	
International Indian Film Academy Awards	23–26 April 2014	Best Screenplay	Prasoon Joshi	Won	
International Indian Film Academy Awards	23–26 April 2014	Best Dialogue	Prasoon Joshi	Won	
International Indian Film Academy Awards	23–26 April 2014	Best Cinematography	Binod Pradhan	Won	
International Indian Film Academy Awards	23–26 April 2014	Best Editing	P.S. Bharati	Won	
International Indian Film Academy Awards	23–26 April 2014	Best Costume Design	Dolly Ahluwalia	Won	
International Indian Film Academy Awards	23–26 April 2014	Best Makeup	Vikram Gaikwad	Won	
International Indian Film Academy Awards	23–26 April 2014	Best Sound Design	Nakul Kamte	Won	
International Indian Film Academy Awards	23–26 April 2014	Best Sound Mixing	Debajit Changmai	Won	
Mirchi Music Awards	27 February 2014	Lyricist of The Year	Prasoon Joshi – (for "Maston Ka Jhund")	Won	
Mirchi Music Awards	27 February 2014	Song representing Sufi tradition	"Mera Yaar"	Won	
National Film Awards	3 May 2014	Best Popular Film Providing Wholesome Entertainment	Producer: Viacom 18 Motion Pictures and ROMP Pictures; Director: Rakeysh Omprakash Mehra	Won	
National Film Awards	3 May 2014	Best Choreography	Ganesh Acharya – (for "Masto Ka Jhoond")	Won	
Producers Guild Film Awards	16 January 2014	Best Film	Bhaag Milkha Bhaag	Won	
Producers Guild Film Awards	16 January 2014	Best Director	Rakeysh Omprakash Mehra	Won	
Producers Guild Film Awards	16 January 2014	Best Actor in a Leading Role	Farhan Akhtar	Won	
Producers Guild Film Awards	16 January 2014	Best Actress in a Supporting Role	Divya Dutta	Won	
Producers Guild Film Awards	16 January 2014	Best Music Director	Shankar–Ehsaan–Loy	Nominated	
Producers Guild Film Awards	16 January 2014	Best Lyricist	Prasoon Joshi – (for "Bhaag Milkha Bhaag")	Nominated	
Producers Guild Film Awards	16 January 2014	Best Story	Prasoon Joshi	Won	
Producers Guild Film Awards	16 January 2014	Best Screenplay	Prasoon Joshi	Won	
Producers Guild Film Awards	16 January 2014	Best Dialogue	Prasoon Joshi	Nominated	
Producers Guild Film Awards	16 January 2014	Best Cinematography	Binod Pradhan	Won	
Producers Guild Film Awards	16 January 2014	Best Choreography	Ganesh Acharya – (for "Masto Ka Jhoond")	Nominated	
Producers Guild Film Awards	16 January 2014	Best Sound Design	Nakul Kamte	Won	
Screen Awards	14 January 2014	Best Film	Bhaag Milkha Bhaag	Won	
Screen Awards	14 January 2014	Best Director	Rakeysh Omprakash Mehra	Nominated	
Screen Awards	14 January 2014	Best Actor	Farhan Akhtar	Won	
Screen Awards	14 January 2014	Best Actor (Popular Choice)	Farhan Akhtar	Nominated	
Screen Awards	14 January 2014	Best Child Artist	Japtej Singh	Won	
Screen Awards	14 January 2014	Best Music Director	Shankar–Ehsaan–Loy	Nominated	
Screen Awards	14 January 2014	Best Background Music	Shankar–Ehsaan–Loy	Won	
Screen Awards	14 January 2014	Best Lyricist	Prasoon Joshi – (for "Zinda")	Nominated	
Screen Awards	14 January 2014	Best Male Playback Singer	Siddharth Mahadevan – (for "Zinda")	Nominated	
Screen Awards	14 January 2014	Best Dialogue	Prasoon Joshi	Nominated	
Screen Awards	14 January 2014	Best Cinematography	Binod Pradhan	Nominated	
Zee Cine Awards	8 February 2014	Best Film	Bhaag Milkha Bhaag	Nominated	
Zee Cine Awards	8 February 2014	Critics Award for Best Film	Bhaag Milkha Bhaag	Won	
Zee Cine Awards	8 February 2014	Best Director	Rakeysh Omprakash Mehra	Nominated	
Zee Cine Awards	8 February 2014	Critics Award for Best Director	Rakeysh Omprakash Mehra	Won	
Zee Cine Awards	8 February 2014	Best Actor – Male	Farhan Akhtar	Nominated	
Zee Cine Awards	8 February 2014	Critics Award for Best Actor – Male	Farhan Akhtar	Won	
Zee Cine Awards	8 February 2014	Best Actor in a Supporting Role – Female	Divya Dutta	Won	
Zee Cine Awards	8 February 2014	Best Music Director	Shankar–Ehsaan–Loy	Nominated	
Zee Cine Awards	8 February 2014	Best Background Score	Shankar–Ehsaan–Loy	Nominated	
Zee Cine Awards	8 February 2014	Best Lyricist	Prasoon Joshi – (for "Zinda")	Nominated	
Zee Cine Awards	8 February 2014	Best Playback Singer – Male	Javed Bashir – (for "Mere Yaar")	Nominated	
Zee Cine Awards	8 February 2014	Best Cinematography	Binod Pradhan	Nominated	
Zee Cine Awards	8 February 2014	Best Sound Design	Nakul Kamte	Nominated	
Zee Cine Awards	8 February 2014	Best Production Design	Sumit Basu (Acropoliis Design Ltd)	Nominated	

== See also ==
- List of films about the sport of athletics
- Gold
- Paan Singh Tomar
- Mary Kom
- Azhar
- M.S. Dhoni: The Untold Story
