= Thirumanam Enum Nikkah (soundtrack) =

Thirumanam Ennum Nikkah

Soundtrack album by Ghibran
- Released: 15 December 2013
- Recorded: 2013
- Genre: Feature film soundtrack
- Length: 27:09
- Language: Tamil
- Label: Think Music
- Producer: Ghibran

Ghibran chronology
Naiyaandi (2013)	Thirumanam Ennum Nikkah (2013)	Run Raja Run (2014)

Thirumanam Ennum Nikkah is the soundtrack album to the 2014 film of the same name directed by Anis and produced by V. Ravichandran of Aascar Films, starring Jai and Nazriya Nazim. The soundtrack featured six songs composed by Ghibran and lyrics written by Kadhal Mathi, Munna Shaoukat Ali, Karthik Netha, Parvathy, Thenmozhi and Nizami Brothers. It was released through Think Music on 15 December 2013 to positive reviews from critics, and the songs "Enthaaraa Enthaaraa" and "Kannukkul Pothivaippen" became chartbusters.

== Development ==
The film's original score and six-song soundtrack were composed by Ghibran, with lyrics written by Kadhal Mathi, Munna Shaoukat Ali, Karthik Netha, Parvathy, Thenmozhi and Nizami Brothers. Keeping with the film's story, that revolved around a romance between two Hindu people taking over the identities of Muslim and a potential inter-religious marriage, Ghibran emphasized on classical and Sufi music. Most of the songs were raga oriented, with "Kannukkul Pothivaippen" was set in Carnatic hamir kalyani and the Hindustani kedar raga. (Note: Karthik Srinivasan mistakenly mentioned the song was being set in Bhairavi and Bihag, with its singer Charulatha claimed that the song was set in hamir kalyani and kedar raga.) Anil Srinivasan in his blog for Scroll.in also noted on the song being set in the Janya raga Mukhari (a derivative of Kharaharapriya), and while closely associated with the Bhairavi raga. The songs were performed by Vijay Prakash, Charulatha Mani, Sadhana Sargam, Sundar Narayana Rao, Kaushiki Chakraborty, Bonnie Chakraborty amongst others.

== Release ==
The soundtrack was marketed by Think Music and released on 15 December 2013 at a soft launch held at Sathyam Cinemas in Chennai with the film's cast and crew being present. Prior to the launch, all the songs in the film were aired on Radio Mirchi as a part of promotional purposes. The video song of "Kannukkul Pothivaippen" was released on 23 May 2014 for promotional purposes and was widely shared online.

== Reception ==
The album opened to positive response from critics and audiences. A reviewer from The Times of India wrote "Ghibran gets to explore a variety of genres and gives us a finely textured album that manages to find that sweet spot between being creative and being listener-friendly" giving a rating of 3 out of 5. Karthik Srinivasan of Milliblog wrote "The range of songs in this soundtrack is mind-boggling; Ghibran seems to have handled them with amazing dexterity! There is little doubt that Ghibran is the most exciting Tamil composer in recent times!" S. Saraswathi of Rediff.com mentioned that "Music by Ghibran is one of the highlights of the film and all the songs have been well picturised." Anupama Subramanian of Deccan Chronicle complimented "Ghibran’s soulful music and brilliant rerecording" as the film's highlight. Ashutosh Mohan of Film Companion South noted on "Enthaaraa Enthaaraa" and said, "The song itself sounds a bit like a palpitating heart but the prosaic visuals in the film douse all the poetry and leave us with just a tune."

== Track listing ==
No.	Title	Lyrics	Singer(s)	Length
1.	"Chillendra Chillendra"	Kadhal Mathi, Munna Shaoukat Ali	Ghibran, Sundar Narayana Rao, Kaushiki Chakrabarty, Munna Shaoukat Ali	05:37
2.	"Enthaaraa Enthaaraa"	Karthik Netha	Shadab Faridi, Chinmayi	04:41
3.	"Kannukkul Pothivaippen"	Parvathy	Charulatha Mani, Sadhana Sargam, Vijay Prakash, Dr. R. Ganesh	04:44
4.	"Rayile Raa"	Thenmozhi Das	Bonnie Chakraborty, Nivas, Haresh, Ashwitha	05:32
5.	"Yaaro Ival"	Parvathy	Yazin Nizar, Harish Raghavendra, Krishna Iyer	03:55
6.	"Khwaja Ji"	Nizami Brothers	Arifullah Shah Khalif-e-Rifayee	02:49
Total length:				27:09

== Awards and nominations ==
Award	Date of ceremony (Note: Date is linked to the article about the awards held that year, wherever possible.)	Category	Recipient(s) and nominee(s)	Result	Ref(s)
South Indian International Movie Awards	6–7 August 2015	Best Music Director – Tamil	Ghibran	Won	
South Indian International Movie Awards	6–7 August 2015	Best Male Playback Singer – Tamil	Shadab Faridi for "Enthaaraa Enthaaraa"	Nominated	
