= Govindapur =

Govindapur may refer to:

- Govindapur, India
- Govindapur, Dhanusa, Nepal
- Govindapur, Parsa, Nepal
- Govindapur, Morang, Nepal

== See also ==
- Govindpur (disambiguation)
- Govindapura (disambiguation)
- Gobindpur (disambiguation)
- Gobindapur (disambiguation)
