= Akaash Vani =

2013 Indian film by Luv Ranjan

- Film cover
- Directed by: Luv Ranjan
- Written by: Luv Ranjan
- Produced by: Kumar Mangat Pathak; Abhishek Pathak
- Starring: Kartik Aaryan; Nushrat Bharucha; Fatima Sana Shaikh; Sunny Singh
- Cinematography: Sudhir K. Chaudhary
- Edited by: Akiv Ali; Abhishek Seth
- Music by: Hitesh Sonik
- Production company: Wide Frame Pictures
- Distributed by: Zee Studios International
- Release date: 25 January 2013
- Country: India
- Language: Hindi
- Budget: ₹10 crore
- Box office: ₹2.24 crore

Akaash Vani is a 2013 Indian Hindi-language romantic drama film directed by Luv Ranjan, and produced by Kumar Mangat Pathak and Abhishek Pathak under the banner of Wide Frame Pictures. This was the second collaboration between the producer and director, following the 2011 film Pyaar Ka Punchnama. and stars two of its leads, Kartik Aaryan and Nushrat Bharucha, in the titular roles. The film was released worldwide on 25 January 2013.

== Plot ==
Akaash Kapoor (Kartik Aaryan) is a bold and fun-loving young man, while Vani Mehra is a conservative but friendly girl. They are both accepted in the same college in Delhi and after a series of adventures, they soon become friends, forming part of a group of four. Akaash and Vani eventually fall in love and embark on a four-year relationship, which is kept secret from Vani's traditional parents.

As their final year ends, Akaash decides to go to the UK for further studies. Vani returns to her hometown of Dehradun to attend her sister's wedding, after which she plans to study for an M.B.A. She tells her sister about her relationship with Akaash, but her sister reacts negatively, saying their parents would disapprove. The next day, amidst the wedding preparation, Vani finds out that her sister has eloped with another man, who she was in love with but was not accepted by her parents. Vani's parents are heartbroken and have to endure the shame of their neighbours and community. In fear of society's response, they decide to marry Vani to the son of an acquaintance. Pressured by her parents and feeling guilt over her sister's actions, Vani reluctantly agrees. She emotionally ends things with Akaash via a phone call and requests him not to try and meet her. Akaash is devastated but slowly becomes bitter and detached with time.

Vani's husband, Ravi Sinha (Sunny Singh), is a charming but controlling man who pressures Vani to have sex, despite her reluctance. Ravi is emotionally abusive and expects Vani to cater to his every need, but pretends to be a perfect husband in front of friends and family. He prevents her from going out, working, or furthering her studies and expects her to be a full-time housewife. After an argument, Vani returns home and reveals her unhappiness to her parents. However, they send her back to Ravi after he charms them and ask him to consider starting a family to occupy Vani's time. Time goes by, and Vani slowly begins losing self-confidence and becomes resigned to her fate. One day, Vani's aunt and uncle unexpectedly come to visit her and suggest she go back with them for several days to Delhi to attend her college reunion. Ravi is unhappy but reluctantly agrees since he will also be away on a business trip.

At the college, Vani reunites with her friends, Shekhar and Sumbul, who find her reserved and depressed. She also comes across Akaash, who is still bitter and hurt about their breakup. He angrily confronts her, and she runs away, deciding to return home that night. Her friends meet her at the train station, and Akaash finally breaks down and cries, something he has not allowed himself to do previously. Vani decides to stay. The group spends the week together, during which time they have fun and relive their college memories. Vani tells Akaash the truth about her marriage but says she cannot divorce Ravi because her parents won't handle it, especially after her sister eloped. Akaash tells his friend that he hopes to reunite with Vani and plans to fill her days with adventures and happiness. He hopes this will raise her spirits and give her the courage to leave Ravi. The group travels to Chandigarh, where Akaash and Vani spend time alone together and rekindle their romance. The trip is cut short by a phone call from Vani's parents, requesting she visit them. Conflicted, Vani chooses to return home and emotionally leaves Shekhar, Sumbul, and Akaash behind.

Akaash decides he can't lose Vani again, and the group follows Vani to her home. They stay happily with Vani's parents until Ravi arrives there, too. Akaash observes how Vani assumes the role of a subservient wife and how her husband ill treats her. That night, Vani finally realises that she can no longer live with a man who cannot respect her. Right away, in front of her friends and Ravi, she reveals the truth to her parents about the rape and emotional abuse Ravi has inflicted on her and demands a divorce. They are stunned and try to reason with her, but she stands her ground. An argument breaks out, and she slaps Ravi, after which he moves to hit her, only to be stopped by Akaash. Ravi realises that the two are in love and insults Vani's parents. Vani's parents are embarrassed, but she defiantly tells them that her happiness is more important than their shame and leaves the house.

Vani returns to Delhi with her friends, where she finally furthers her education and completes her M.B.A. degree. She happily divorces Ravi and later marries Akaash.

== Cast ==
- Kartik Aaryan as Akaash Kapoor, Vani's love interest
- Nushrat Bharucha as Vani Mehra, Akaash's love interest
- Kiran Kumar as Vani's father
- Sunny Singh as Ravi Sinha, Vani's abusive husband
- Prachi Shah as Sunanda Malhotra, Vani's aunt
- Fatima Sana Shaikh as Sumbul Yakub, Akaash and Vani's friend and classmate
- Gautam Mehra as Shekhar Roy, Akaash and Vani's friend and classmate
- Mahesh Thakur as Vishal Malhotra, Vani's uncle
- Subhangi Latkar as Vani's mother

== Critical reception ==
Akaash Vani received overall positive reviews from critics. IANS of NDTV rated the film 4/5, praising the performances of its lead pair. Renuka Vyavahare of The Times of India gave the film three stars, calling it a "strong and moving social drama". Taran Adarsh of Bollywood Hungama gave the film 3.5 stars, and praised the acting and characterisation, adding that "the movie contains just the right blend of sparkle and spice and is definitely worthy of a watch." On the other hand, Rajeev Masand of CNN-IBN was more critical of the film, giving it 1.5/5, commenting that the film's script is "inconsistent"

== Release ==
Aakaash Vani DVD was released on 1 March 2013.

== Soundtrack ==
The music of the film is composed by Hitesh Sonik with lyrics penned by Luv Ranjan. Musicperk.com rated the album 7.5 out of 10, saying, "(This is) a decent album and shows that Hitesh is here to stay for a lengthy stint." The item song "Crazy Lover" became a hit when it was released. Vishal Dadlani and Sunidhi Chauhan sang the song

Akaash Vani

Soundtrack album by Hitesh Sonik
- Released: 25 December 2012
- Recorded: 2012
- Genre: Film soundtrack
- Label: T-Series
- Producer: Hitesh Sonik

Tracklisting
No.	Title	Singer(s)	Length
1.	"Pad Gaye Ji"	K.K., Sunidhi Chauhan	6:39
2.	"Crazy Lover"	Vishal Dadlani, Sunidhi Chauhan	4:42
3.	"Bas Main Aur Tu"	Nikhil D'Souza, Vasudha Sharma	4:26
4.	"Rumani"	Thomson Andrews, Shalmali Kholgade	4:06
5.	"Tera Mera Naam"	Shafqat Amanat Ali	6:08
6.	"Bas Main Aur Tu (Reprise)"	Nikhil D'Souza, Vasudha Sharma	4:56
Total length:			30:57
