= Vishwaroopam (soundtrack) =

Vishwaroopam/ Vishwaroop
- Hindi album cover

Soundtrack album by Shankar–Ehsaan–Loy
- Released: 7 December 2012 (Tamil); 28 December 2012 (Hindi)
- Recorded: 2012
- Genre: Feature film soundtrack
- Length: 23:25; 23:35 (Hindi)
- Languages: Tamil; Hindi
- Label: Sony Music India
- Producer: Shankar–Ehsaan–Loy

Shankar–Ehsaan–Loy chronology
Chittagong (2012)	Vishwaroopam/ Vishwaroop (2012)	Bhaag Milkha Bhaag (2013)

Vishwaroopam is the soundtrack album, composed by the music trio Shankar–Ehsaan–Loy, for the Tamil film of the same name, directed by Kamal Haasan. The album features five tracks, with lyrics penned by Vairamuthu and Kamal Hassan himself. The soundtrack's Hindi version Vishwaroop, has lyrics penned by Javed Akhtar.

== Production ==
Initially, Yuvan Shankar Raja was rumored to compose the film's musical score since the film was supposed to be directed by director Selvaraghavan, a frequent collaborator of Raja. However, later Kamal was confirmed to direct the film himself and signed in the musical trio Shankar–Ehsaan–Loy to compose music for the trilingual, who had, in their early days, composed music for his trilingual Aalavandhan. Lyricist Vairamuthu was confirmed for the Tamil version of the film, after Kamal Haasan had approached him and narrated the entire plot, to which he immediately agreed to work upon. Javed Akhtar has penned lyrics for the Hindi version, while Ramajogayya Shastry has done the lyrics for the dubbed Telugu version.

== Release ==
The audio was initially expected to release on 7 November 2012, coinciding with Haasan's birthday. The audio launch was planned to be launched simultaneously in Chennai, Coimbatore and Madurai. However, due to Cyclone Nilam, it was postponed. The film's audio rights were sold to Sony Music.

The album was released on 7 December 2012, at Chennai on a grand event at YMCA Royapettah, after launching the audio in Madurai and Coimbatore. The first copy of the audio was released by Ilayaraja, who had collaborated with Kamal on his previous productions. The function was attended by various celebrities including Andrea Jeremiah, Pooja Kumar, Bharathiraja, A.R. Murugadoss, K.S. Ravikumar, Vasanth, Suresh Krishna, Prabhu Solomon, Dharani, Gautami, Lingusamy, Jayaram, Shankar–Ehsaan–Loy, Karthik, Karunas, and Prabhu.

== Track list ==
Tamil
No.	Title	Lyrics	Singer(s)	Length
1.	"Vishwaroopam"	Vairamuthu	Suraj Jagan	4:22
2.	"Thuppaki Engal Tholile"	Vairamuthu; English lyrics by Asif Ali Beg	Kamal Haasan & Benny Dayal	4:42
3.	"Unnai Kaanadhu Naan"	Kamal Haasan	Kamal Haasan & Shankar Mahadevan	5:35
4.	"Anu Vidhaiththa Boomiyile"	Kamal Haasan	Kamal Haasan & Nikhil D'Souza	4:16
5.	"Vishwaroopam (Remix)"	Vairamuthu	Remixed by Shane Mendonsa	4:23
Total length:				23:25

Hindi
No.	Title	Lyrics	Singer(s)	Length
1.	"Vishwaroop"	Javed Akhtar	Suraj Jagan	4:24
2.	"Jung Hai"	Javed Akhtar; English lyrics by Asif Ali Beg	Shankar Mahadevan, Benny Dayal	4:46
3.	"Main Radha Tu Shaam"	Javed Akhtar	Kamal Haasan & Shankar Mahadevan	5:39
4.	"Koi Kahin"	Javed Akhtar	Kamal Haasan & Nikhil D'Souza	4:19
5.	"Vishwaroop (Remix)"	Javed Akhtar	Remixed by Shane Mendonsa	4:27
Total length:				23:35

Telugu
No.	Title	Lyrics	Singer(s)	Length
1.	"Vishwaroopam"	Ramajogayya Sastry	Suraj Jagan	4:22
2.	"Thupakee Thone Jeevitham"	Ramajogayya Sastry; English lyrics by Asif Ali Beg	Shankar Mahadevan & Benny Dayal	4:42
3.	"Undalaenandhi Naa Kannu"	Ramajogayya Sastry	Kamal Haasan & Shankar Mahadevan	5:35
4.	"Anu Vinasa Varshamidhi"	Ramajogayya Sastry	Kamal Haasan & Nikhil D'Souza	4:16
5.	"Vishwaroopam (Remix)"	Ramajogayya Sastry	Remixed by Shane Mendonsa	4:23
Total length:				23:25

== Reception ==
Professional ratings
Review scores
Source	Rating
Musicperk	8/10 stars
Music Aloud	8.5/10 stars
Behindwoods	3.5/5 stars
Tamil Music Review	8.5/10 stars
Haihoi	4/5 stars
IndiaGlitz	3.5/5 stars
Rediff	3/5 stars
Thamarai	8.5/10 stars

The soundtrack was met with positive response from music critics upon release. Musicperk.com noted, "SEL are one of the very few versatile composers around the country and that explains Kamal's choice for their music. This album would rank as one of the best albums of SEL...The songs are quite ahead of its time & by the passage of time, will get even better recognition.". Music Aloud's review called the album "a must listen" Pavithra Srinivasan of Rediff described the album as "a pleasant listening experience" Behindwoods said, "[Shankar–Ehsaan–Loy] bring their A-game to the party and it's a highly focused effort with absolutely no room for fillers. Seriously good!" IndiaGlitz praised the album saying,"[The] album draws a fine line between top-notch music and director-friendly music that prioritizes the storyline above everything else". Thamarai.com praised the album for its "exquisitely-penned lyrics and brilliant vocal performances". Charulatha Mani describes "Unnai Kaanadhu Naan" as the "piece-de-resistance of raga Jaijaivanti" in Tamil film music.

The soundtrack, within hours of its release, climbed up to #3 in iTunes Chart.
