= Raaga Trippin' =

Raaga Trippin
- Origin: Mumbai, India
- Genres: A cappella
- Years active: 2012 –present
- Members: Alan De Souza, Gary Misquitta, Keshia Braganza, Rohan Sequeira and Suzanne D'Mello
- Past members: Gwen Dias, Lara Pinto, Thomson Andrews

Raaga Trippin are an Indian a cappella group consisting of six vocalists based in Mumbai, India. Formed in May 2012, their work mainly consists of covers of popular Bollywood music and western pop music, sometimes in the form of medleys. These singer-songwriters also sing in Hindi, Telugu, Tamil, French, Spanish, Swahili, Punjabi and other Indian languages. They've worked with Amit Trivedi and A. R. Rahman among others, and have performed at events across India and abroad. They have all worked as backing vocalists for reputed artists.
