= Zinda (song) =

Song by Shankar–Ehsaan–Loy (composer) Siddharth Mahadevan (singer)

from the album Bhaag Milkha Bhaag
- Released: 23 May 2013
- Recorded: 2011
- Genre: Stadium rock, progressive rock, Filmi
- Length: 3:30
- Label: Sony Music India
- Songwriter: Prasoon Joshi
- Producer: Rakeysh Omprakash Mehra

"Zinda" (transl. Alive) is a song from the soundtrack Bhaag Milkha Bhaag of the 2013 Hindi biographical drama of the same name. The song was composed by Shankar–Ehsaan–Loy and performed by Siddharth Mahadevan, son of Shankar Mahadevan, who made his bollywood singing debut through this song. The lyrics of the song were penned by Prasoon Joshi.

== Development ==
The progressive rock song, according to Ehsaan Noorani, has an "anthemic stadium rock feel". Mehra recommended Siddharth for the song as he had heard him sing on a campaign film he had done for an environmental organization. The composers chose him since he had the "grunge" texture to the voice, which the song demanded.

== Release ==
The song, which was part of the initial teaser, was released on 23 May.

=== Charts ===
The song immediately after the release entered Top 10, and later topped the iTunes charts. It also entered the Radio Mirchi Top 10 chart and made its way up post release.
