= Doultabad, Siddipet district =

Doulthabad
- Country: India
- State: Telangana
- District: Siddipet

Languages
  - Official: Telugu
- Time zone: UTC+5:30 (IST)
- PIN: 502247
- Vehicle registration: TG-36

Doultabad (or Doulthabad), is a mandal in the Siddipet district of Telangana, India. It has twenty villages, including Doultabad village, the mandal's centre. Before a district redistribution in 2016, Doultabad mandal was in the Medak district, which, until the 2014 Andhra Pradesh Reorganisation Act, had been within the state of Andhra Pradesh.

== Villages ==
The mandal has twenty villages. Two of these twenty – Upperpally and Govindapur – were gained from neighbouring Chegunta mandal in a reorganisation of districts in 2016.

The following is a list of the eighteen inhabited villages in the Doulthabad mandal:

1. Appaipally
2. Deepayampally
3. Dommat
4. Doultabad (also spelt Doulthabad)
5. Godugupally
6. Govindapur
7. Indupriyal
8. Konapurijara
9. Lingarajpally
10. Machanpally
11. Mohamadshapur
12. Mubaraspur
13. Narsampally (Patti Dommat)
14. Seethrampally (also spelt Sitarampalli)
15. Seripally Bandaram
16. Surampally
17. Thirumalapur
18. Upparpally

There are a further two villages in the mandal which are abandoned or uninhabited: Chandampally and Rangampet.
