= Gobindapur, Bakerganj =

Gobindapur গোবিন্দপুর
- Village
- Location in Bangladesh
- Coordinates: 22°34′N 90°31′E
- Country: Bangladesh
- Division: Barisal Division
- District: Barisal District
- Upazila: Bakerganj Upazila

Population (2022)
  - Total: 6,875
- Time zone: UTC+6 (Bangladesh Time)

Gobindapur is a village in Bakerganj Upazila of Barisal District in the Barisal Division of southern-central Bangladesh.

According to the 2022 Census of Bangladesh, Gobindapur had 1,859 households and a population of 6,875.
