= Govindapuram, Vizianagaram district =

Govindapuram
- Village
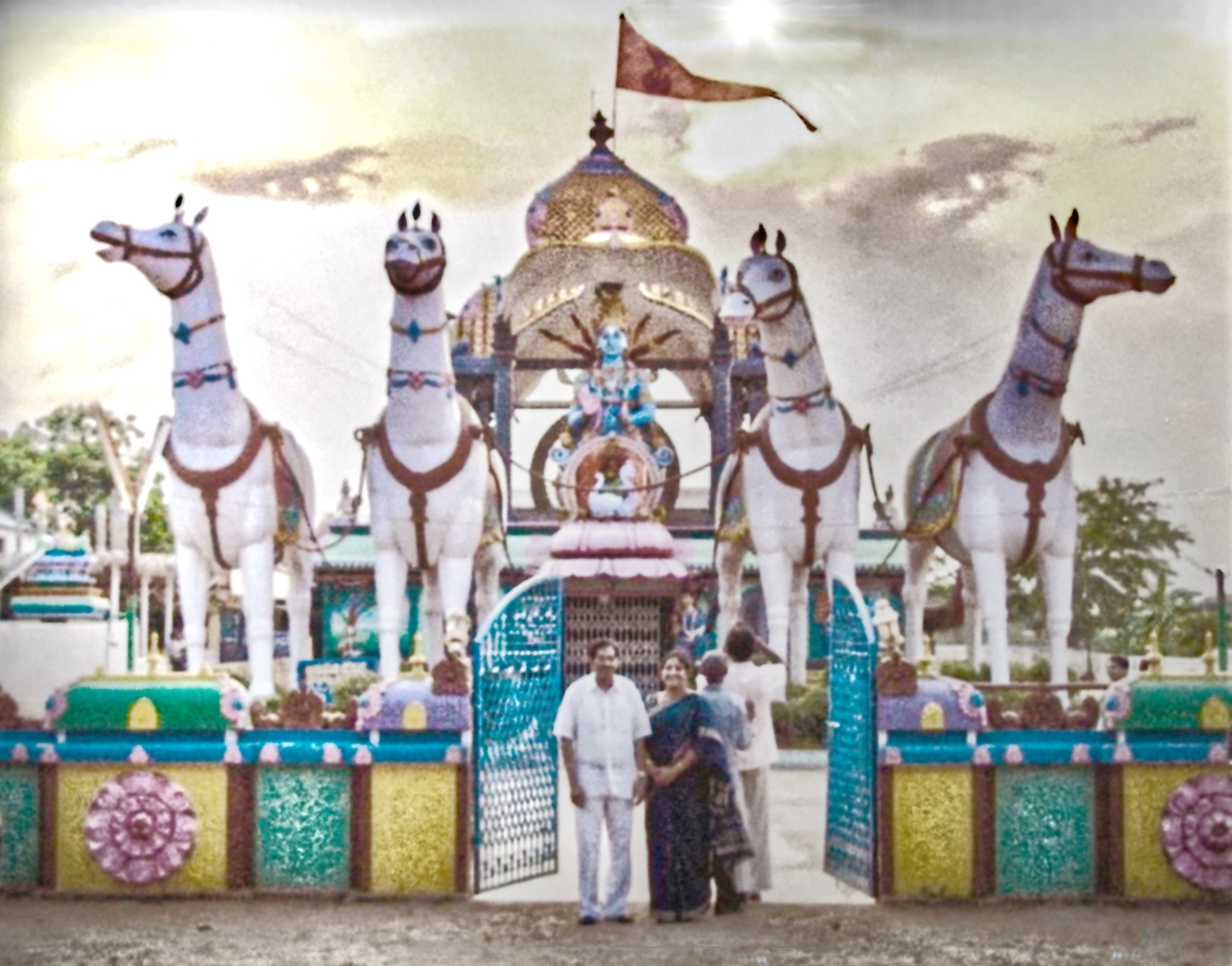
- Entrance of Gitamandir
- Interactive map of Govindapuram
- Location in Andhra Pradesh, India Govindapuram (India)
- Coordinates: 18°05′37″N 83°36′41″E
- Country: India
- State: Andhra Pradesh

Languages
  - Official: Telugu
- Time zone: UTC+5:30 (IST)
- Vehicle registration: AP

Govindapuram is a village in Pusapatirega mandal of Vizianagaram district in Andhra Pradesh, India. The under developed virgin beach near the village and the temple are tourist attractions. It also has a Primary Health Centre.

== See also ==
- Govindapuram in Kozhikode District
- Govindapuram in Palakkad district
