= Gobindpur, Seraikela Kharsawan =

Gobindpur
- Village
- Location in Jharkhand, India Gobindpur (India)
- Coordinates: 22.6423°N 86.0706°E
- Country: India
- State: Jharkhand
- District: Seraikela Kharsawan

Government
  - Type: Federal democracy

Population (2011)
  - Total: 1,577

Languages *
  - Official: Hindi, Santali
- Time zone: UTC+5:30 (IST)
- PIN: 831002
- Telephone/ STD code: 06597
- Vehicle registration: JH 22
- Literacy: 63.36%
- Lok Sabha constituency: Singhbhum
- Vidhan Sabha constituency: Seraikella
- Website: seraikela.nic.in

Gobindpur is a village in the Gobindpur CD block in the Seraikela Sadar subdivision of the Seraikela Kharsawan district in the Indian state of Jharkhand.

== Geography ==
Cities, towns and locations in Seraikela Kharsawan district in Kolhan Division
M: municipality, R: rural/ urban centre, CT: census town, T: tourist centre
Owing to space constraints in the small map, the actual locations in a larger map may vary slightly

=== Location ===
Gobindpur is located at 22.6423°N 86.0706°E

=== Area overview ===
The area shown in the map has been described as "part of the southern fringe of the Chotanagpur plateau and is a hilly upland tract". 75.7% of the population lives in the rural areas and 24.3% lives in the urban areas.

Note: The map alongside presents some of the notable locations in the district. All places marked in the map are linked in the larger full screen map.

== Demographics ==
According to the 2011 Census of India, Gobindpur had a total population of 1,577, of which 802 (51%) were males and 775 (49%) were females. Population in the age range 0–6 years was 245. The total number of literate persons in Gobindpur was 844 (63.36% of the population over 6 years).

(*For language details see Gobindpur block#Language and religion)

== Transport ==
National Highway 220 passes through Gobindpur.

== Education ==
Rajkiya Middle School Govindpur is a Hindi-medium coeducational institution established in 1934. It has facilities for teaching from class I to class VIII.

== Healthcare ==
There is a primary health centre at Gobindpur.
