= Gobindpur, Kapurthala =

Gobindpur
- Village
- Location in Punjab, India Gobindpur (India)
- Country: India
- State: Punjab
- District: Kapurthala

Government
  - Type: Panchayati raj (India)
  - Body: Gram panchayat

Population (2011)
  - Total: 676
- Sex ratio 333/343♂/♀

Languages
  - Official: Punjabi
  - Other spoken: Hindi
- Time zone: UTC+5:30 (IST)
- PIN: 144601
- Telephone code: 01822
- ISO 3166 code: IN-PB
- Vehicle registration: PB-09
- Website: kapurthala.gov.in

Gobindpur is a village in Kapurthala district of Punjab State, India. It is located 9 kilometres (5.6 mi) from Kapurthala, which is both district and sub-district headquarters of Gobindpur. The village is administrated by a Sarpanch, who is an elected representative.

== Demography ==
According to the report published by Census India in 2011, Gobindpur has total number of 126 houses and population of 676 of which include 333 males and 343 females. Literacy rate of Gobindpur is 77.45%, higher than state average of 75.84%. The population of children under the age of 6 years is 64 which is 9.47% of total population of Gobindpur, and child sex ratio is approximately 1207, higher than state average of 846.

== Population data ==
Particulars	Total	Male	Female
Total No. of Houses	126	-	-
Population	676	333	343
Child (0–6)	64	29	35
Schedule Caste	240	118	122
Schedule Tribe	0	0	0
Literacy	77.45 %	83.22 %	71.75 %
Total Workers	224	188	36
Main Worker	146	0	0
Marginal Worker	78	55	23

== Air travel connectivity ==
The closest airport to the village is Sri Guru Ram Dass Jee International Airport.
