= Thomson Andrews =

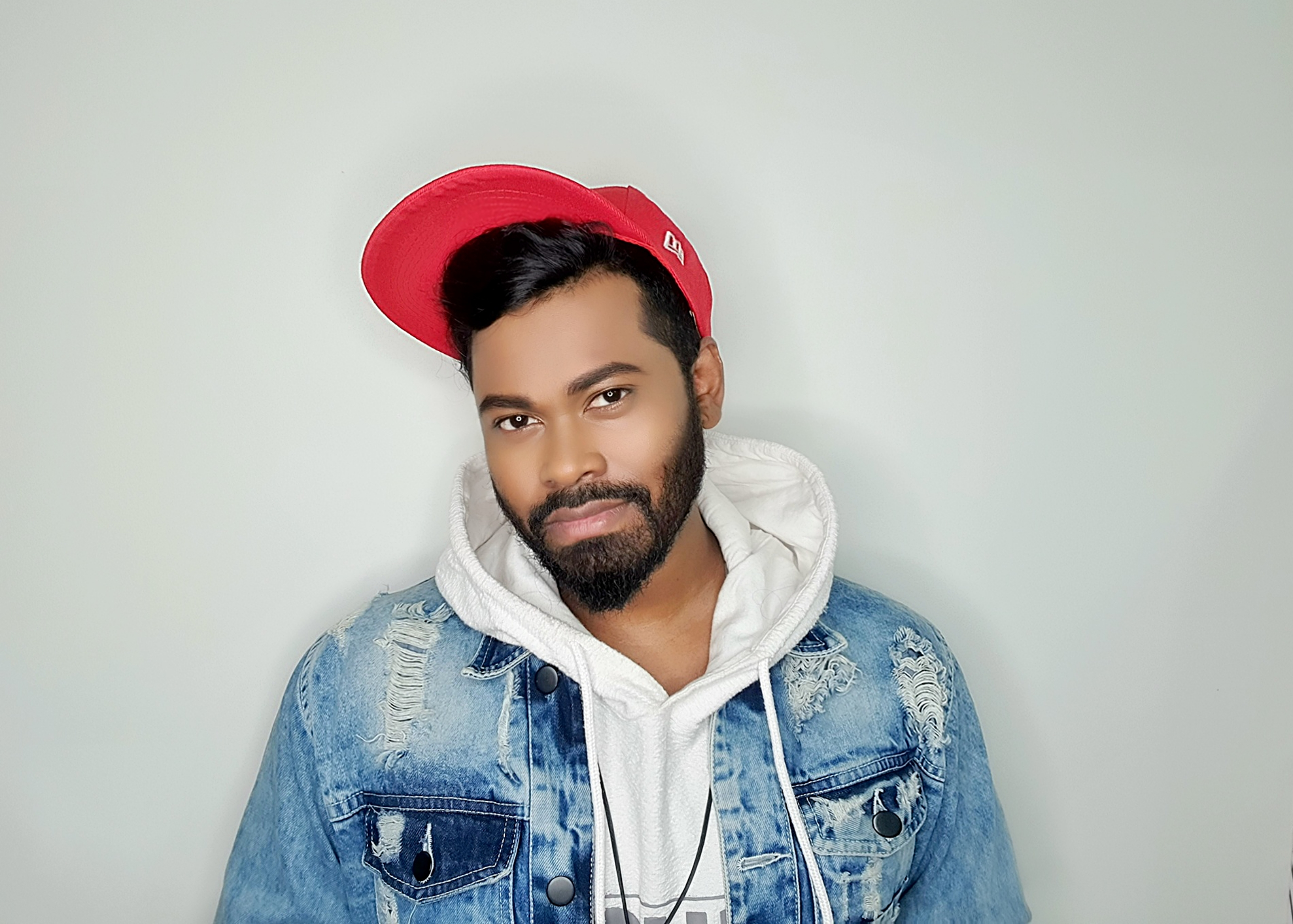
- Thomson Andrews

Background information
- Born: Thomson Roger Andrews; 25 September 1987 (age 39); Mumbai
- Genres: Indipop, contemporary R&B, funk, soul, jazz, gospel, hip hop, pop, rhythm and blues, neo soul
- Occupations: Singer, performer, songwriter, actor, TV host
- Instrument: Vocals
- Years active: 2010–present
- Labels: T-Series, Zee Music Company, Times Music, Saregama, Sony Music India
- Website: thomsonandrews.com

Thomson Andrews (born September 25, 1987, in Mumbai, India) is an Indian contemporary R&B, pop, funk and soul singer-songwriter, performer, recording artist, actor, TV host, and contemporary Indian Bollywood Playback singer.

Andrews began his career with Grammy and Academy Award-winning music composer A. R. Rahman in 2010, and to date has sung in numerous Bollywood and South Indian films. He is known for his involvement in music projects such as Coke Studio (India), MTV Unplugged (India) and has been featured on MTV India alongside composers such as Amit Trivedi, Clinton Cerejo, Shankar Ehsaan Loy, Pritam, Ranjit Barot and singers Neha Kakkar, Arijit Singh, Sonu Nigam, Shafqat Amanat Ali, Agnee, and Indian Ocean.

Andrews has collaborated with Indian music and film composers and directors such as, Vishal Bhardwaj, Mira Nair, Vishal Shekhar, Salim Sulaiman, Ajay Atul, Hitesh Sonik, Leslie Lewis, Anu Malik, Amaal Malik, and Sohail Sen. He also toured with singer Sunidhi Chauhan for three years as a supporting performer and singer Mohit Chauhan for two years. In 2017, Andrews performed for Amazon Prime India on a music and dance reality TV show called The Remix, on which he was the finalist, along with his DJ partner NSG. Subsequently, Andrews was hired by American Idol to promote the show among Indian audiences via the Indian Broadcasting Channel ZeeCafe.

Andrews has sung for Netflix films—Jingle Jangle: A Christmas Journey, The Christmas Chronicles 2, Ludo, Netflix animated series Centaurworld, Money Heist Season 5 promo song Jaldi Aao, and on the background score of the film Brahmāstra, directed by Ayan Mukerji. Thomson's singles and remixes are released across major Indian record labels such as "Uff Teri Ada", "Suit Suit Karda", "Hare Ram" on Tseries, "Rockstar Live" on Zee Music Company, and Happy Nagar on Times Music.

Andrews has sung on numerous Hindi-dubbed Disney productions, including from the Winnie The Pooh franchise, The Little Mermaid TV series, and the films Encanto, The Jungle Book 2, 2019's The Lion King and Aladdin, 2017's Beauty and the Beast, as well as Toy Story, Frozen, The Princess and the Frog and Marvel Studios's Hawkeye series on Disney+. He is the dub voice of 'Wembley' on Apple TV+'s comedy puppet series Fraggle Rock: Back to the Rock and Gonger on Sesame Street.

He has been certified as a Performing Vocalist by Trinity College Of Music, London, and has briefly trained in Hindustani classical singing. Apart from live performances, he also sings on and arranges voicings for films playback songs & background scores. Andrews has sung film songs and ad jingles in several Indian languages such as Hindi, Tamil, Telugu, Malayalam, Kannada, Tulu, Marathi, and Bengali. He has also done several international ad jingles for products in Kenya, Tanzania, Nigeria, the West Indies, and more. He also sings in foreign languages such as Swahili, Portuguese, Spanish, Turkish, and more.

His debut neo-soul single ' People Ain't Things was mastered by Grammy Award winning mastering engineer Reuben Cohen from Lurssen Mastering in Hollywood, California. His music has featured on national television networks like MTV Indies, VH1 India, and 9xO, as well as the radio station Radio One (India). Thomson performed for Vogue India's Women Empowerment initiative #VogueEmpower in 2014. Besides his solo accolades, projects, motown, R&B, funk music tribute concerts, and collaborations, he is part of a popular Indian a cappella ensemble called Raaga Trippin', with whom he performs live shows and creates original and cover songs.

In 2020, Andrews' musical influences and songwriting skills include the genres of pop, R&B, funk, neo-soul, blues, soul, jazz, gospel, hip-hop, opera, rock and roll, and Sufi. He also mentors new musicians via his indie music Label Throan Of Art Music, guiding them with professional singing tips onstage and in the recording studio.

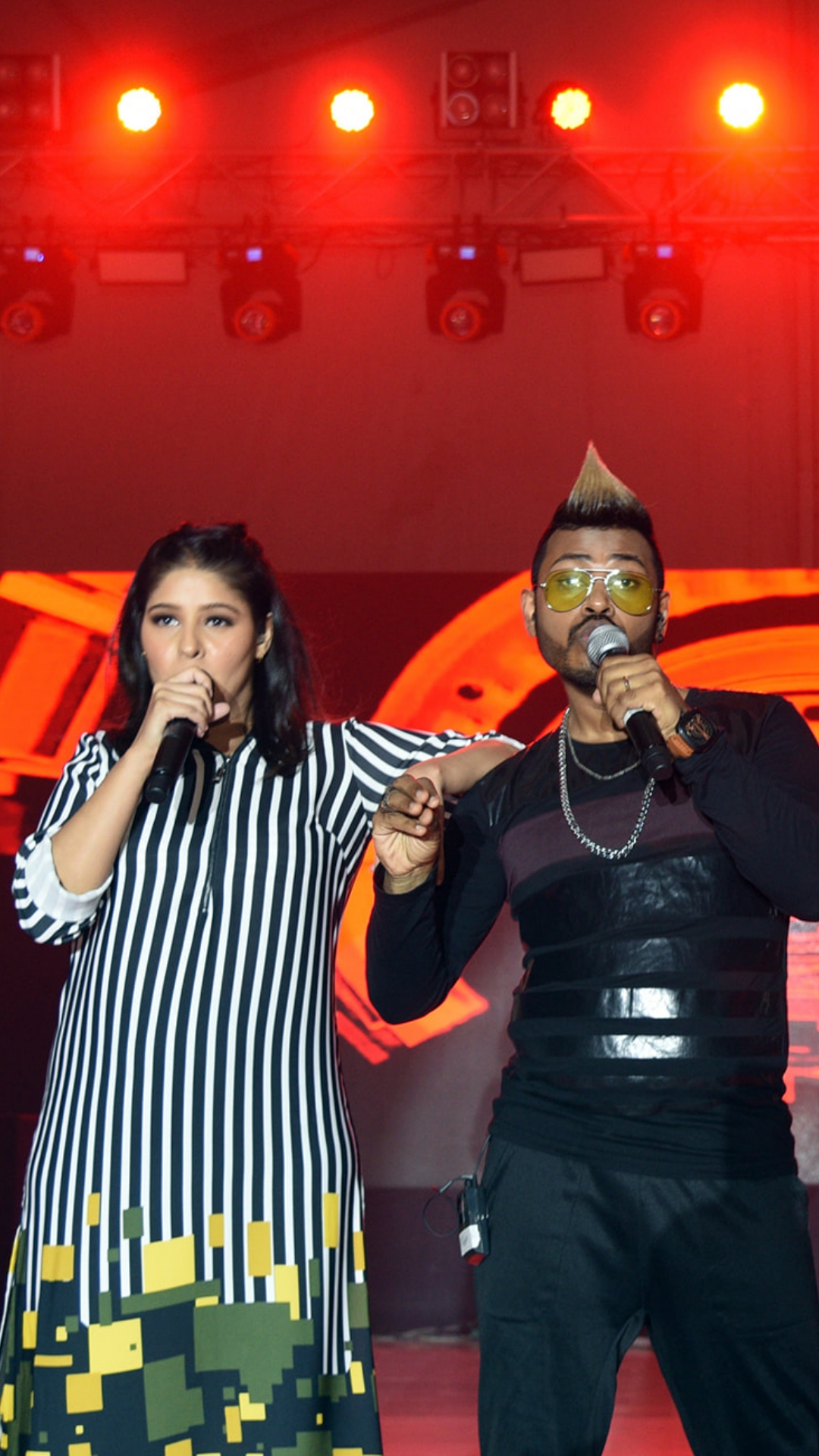
Thomson Andrews performing with Sunidhi Chauhan at a Live concert

== Early life ==
Andrews' involvement in music began when he first participated in school competitions. As a Roman Catholic, he also participated in his church choir. His family had roots in gospel music and its related genres such as blues, soul, and R&B. Andrews was born in Mumbai to a liberal South Indian family, with a father from Kerala and a mother from Chennai.

In 2005, he won a gospel talent show at the age of seventeen. He continued working while pursuing his college education as a science major. Andrews did not pursue a full-time music occupation. Instead, he began a corporate career and worked for four years, gaining experience in auditing, human resources, inventory, and contact centres among. To pursue his musical ambitions, Andrews switched to teaching Western music before beginning to do shows and concert performances.

== Career ==
Andrews began his music career performing at the Indian Premier League (IPL) awards show with A. R. Rahman, his choir conductor Celeste Cordo, and his mentor Clinton Cerejo. Subsequently, he worked with ad composer Rupert Fernandes, who used his voice on ad jingles for products like Nestlé, HCL, and Volkswagen. After the IPL, he continued working with A. R. Rahman on film projects, songs, and background scores with Clinton Cerejo and Suzanne D'Mello.

Andrews has lent his voice to movie songs as an additional vocalist for music directors and has sung on projects and jingles for various ad jingle composers in the advertising industry. His credits for singing and vocal arrangements are mentioned in Bollywood film productions from 2014 to 2015 including Dhoom 3, D-Day, Bhaag Milkha Bhaag, Bang Bang, Happy New Year, Hasee Toh Phasee, Byomkesh Bakshi, and Bombay Velvet. He sang playback songs "Bach Ke Bakshi" for the 2015 movie Byomkesh Bakshi for music director Sneha Khanwalkar; "Shehar Mera" for the movie One By Two for music directors Shankar–Ehsaan–Loy; and "Rumani," a duet with Shalmali Kholgade in the movie Akaash Vani for music director Hitesh Sonik. Apart from Bollywood films, he has also sung playback songs in South Indian films for music director M. Ghibran: "Saridhaana Saridhaana" for the Tamil movie Amara Kaaviyam, "Rajadhi Rajanappa" song for the Telugu film Run Raja Run, "O Pagol Mon" for the Bengali movie Dashami and "Kanna Muche" for the Tulu Film Aamait Asal Eemait Kusal.

Throughout his journey as a full-time vocalist, Andrews has been associated with international music projects. He has sung on the background score of the Oscar-nominated Hollywood film 127 Hours for A. R. Rahman and has lent additional vocals on the song "Satyameva Jayathe" (song) from the international album SuperHeavy for A. R. Rahman, involving Mick Jagger, Joss Stone, and Damian Marley. He has also worked with Indian Hollywood filmmaker Mira Nair along with music director Vishal Bhardwaj on songs for the musical adaptation of her film Monsoon Wedding. He has performed in an international opera, Madama Butterfly, including cast members from Austria, Korea, and America, staged at the National Centre for the Performing Arts (India) and has musically directed adaptations of the musicals Joseph and the Amazing Technicolor Dreamcoat and Oliver staged in Mumbai and played the role of Mr Bumble in Oliver. He performed with the Cadenza Kantori choir at The Rottenburg am Neckar Festival of Choirs in Germany and at Taizé Community in Burgundy, France.

Andrews can sing in 12 languages and currently performs across the globe. He is also associated with Sunidhi Chauhan's Live Bollywood music concerts. He is featured in the worldwide Amazon Prime Original music show The Remix as one of the newer contemporary Indian playback singers and live performers. He has sung for 100+ TV commercials, including for ESPN, Nestlé, Samsung, Hindustan Unilever, Mahindra, Tata, Sony, Gatorade, Volkswagen, Kinderjoy, Wrigley, Maruti Suzuki, Sunfeast by ITC, Airtel, Amazon fashion, Myntra, Serengeti Beer, Zee Cafe, Kingfisher, Reliance trends, Raymonds suiting, and Shell Petrol.

In April 2014, Andrews launched his debut single, "People Ain't Things", a collaboration with Grammy Award-winning sound mixer Reuben Cohen (Hollywood) and Deepak Palikonda. The track won prominent airtime on MTV Indies, VH1 India, 9XO, and Radio One.

In 2015, Andrews, as RaagaTrippin, hosted the red carpet event at the Radio Mirchi Music Awards and performed at the Global Indian Music Academy Awards with music director Pritam Chakraborty. As RaagaTrippin, he also performed at the Indian Premier League opening ceremony in 2015 with music director Pritam Chakraborty.

Since then, he has released other singles: "I Got Your Money" in 2017, "We're No Strangers" in 2018, and "Ke Holi Hain" in 2018. The latter two songs were favourably received and played frequently on BBC Asian Network Radio – London. They were tracks of the week at IGYM. The songs' music videos have garnered more than one million YouTube views.

Andrews, who is known for his quirky style, hair-dos, and glasses, performed for Vogue India's Women Empowerment initiative #VogueEmpower in 2014. He organizes Motown, R&B, funk, and soul music tribute concerts in Mumbai.

In 2019, Andrews became a TV host for a 6 episode music travel-based reality show shot across India, called Royal Stag Hungama Music Bus. During this time, he experienced Indian culture, the local cuisine, cultural music, impromptu jams with homegrown bands, and Indian popular celebrity music icons from each city and state. Along with the local bands, these celebrities would jam with Thomson, and together they would vibe on a tour bus named Royal Stag Hungama Music Bus. These celebrities shared their untold experiences, followed by a light-hearted chat about music, food, and more. The event would then end with a concert performed by the music icons for their fans in that particular state or city. This music travel reality show featured the likes of Javed Ali, Hardy Sandhu, Jassi Gill, Indian Ocean, Jeet Ganguly & Revanth, which aired on Showbox Channel and on Hungama Digital Media.

== Singles ==
Discography
Year	Song	Language	Note(s)	Ref
2021	Cut to the Chase	English	Throan Of Art Music	
2016	Befikra	Hindi	Meet bros – Tseries	

== Filmography ==
Discography
Year	Song	Movie	Language	Music composer	Note(s)	Ref
2013	"Rumani"	Akaash Vani	Hindi	Hitesh Sonik		
