= Gobindpur, Punjab =

Gobindpur
- Village
- Location in Punjab, India Gobindpur (India) Gobindpur (Asia)
- Coordinates: 31.231494°N 75.993785°E
- Country: India
- State: Punjab
- District: Shaheed Bhagat Singh Nagar

Government
  - Type: Panchayat raj
  - Body: Gram panchayat
- Elevation: 247 m (810 ft)

Population (2011)
  - Total: 2,072
- Sex ratio 1076/996 ♂/♀

Language
  - Official: Punjabi
- Time zone: UTC+5:30 (IST)
- PIN: 144510
- Telephone code: 01823 (SBS Nagar)
- ISO 3166 code: IN-PB
- Vehicle registration: PB-32 S.B.S NAGAR, PB-78 Banga
- Village Code: 32120
- Post office: Gobindpur (38)
- Website: nawanshahr.nic.in

Gobindpur is a village in Shaheed Bhagat Singh Nagar district of in the Indian state of Punjab. it was originally known as Salaimpur, but later had its name changed to Gobindpur after Guru Hargobind visited it in the 17th century. It is located 3.8 kilometres (2.4 mi) away from City Banga, 19.7 kilometres (12.2 mi) from district headquarters Nawanshahr and 110 kilometres (68 mi) from state capital Chandigarh. The village is administrated by Sarpanch an elected representative of the village.

== Demography ==
As of 2011 Indian Census, Gobindpur had a total population of 2,072, of which 1,076 were males and 996 were females. Population within the age group of 0 to 6 years was 194. The total number of literates in Gobindpur was 1,538, which constituted 74.2% of the population with male literacy of 78.0% and female literacy of 70.2%. The effective literacy rate of 7+ population of Gobindpur was 81.9%, of which male literacy rate was 87.4% and female literacy rate was 76.1%. The Scheduled Castes population was 841, which is 40.6% of the total population. Gobindpur had 411 households in 2011.

== Geography ==
Gobindpur is approximately 329 km from Capital New Delhi, 106 km from the state capital Chandigarh, 109 km from Amritsar, 55 km from Jalandhar and 1493 km from Mumbai. It is in the northwest part of India; a few hundred kilometers south of Kashmir and to the west of the Himalayan foothills of Punjab and Himachal Pradesh. On a clear day, the snow-clad peaks of the Dhauladhar range are visible in the distant horizon. The Banga Railway station is located on the Jalandhar City. Jaijon Doaba Line of the Northern Railway at 13 km from Nawanshahr, 43 km from Jalandhar, and 45 km from Ludhiana. It is also linked by National Highway 344A with Nawanshahr and Phagwara Grand Trunk Road from Banga.

== Education ==
The village has a Punjabi medium, Government Senior Secondary School founded in 1950's.|List of Schools and Colleges in SBS Nagar district| The schools provide mid-day meal as per Indian Midday Meal Scheme and the meal prepared in school premises. As per Right of Children to Free and Compulsory Education Act the school provide free education to children between the ages of 6 and 14.

Sikh National College and Guru Nanak College for Women are the nearest colleges. Industrial Training Institute for women (ITI Nawanshahr) is 19 kilometres (12 mi). The village is 89.5 kilometres (55.6 mi) away from Chandigarh University, 19 kilometres (12 mi) from Indian Institute of Technology and 37 kilometres (23 mi) away from Lovely Professional University.

== Transport ==
=== By road ===
Gobindpur is connected to Banga with local buses available. There is a large network of government and private bus services of Punjab, Haryana, Chandigarh, Himachal Pradesh.

=== By rail ===
Banga railway station (BXB) is the nearest train station about 4 km. however there some other railway station here

- Jalandhar - JUC (50KM)
- Phagwara - PGW (23 km)
- SBS Nagar - SBSN (19 km)
- Jaijon - JJJ (30 km)
- Garhshankar - GSR(16 km)

=== By air ===
Nearby airports include:

Domestic Airport

- Adampur Airport - AIP (34 km), is the nearest domestic airport
- Sahnewal Airport, Ludhiana - LUH(64 km Via Apra-Banga Road)

International Airport

- Chandigarh Airport - IXC(118.7 km)
- Sri Guru Ram Dass Jee International Airport, Amritsar - ATQ(141.7 km)
- Indira Gandhi International Airport, Delhi - DEL (364.2 km)

== See also ==
- List of villages in India
