= Govindapur, Medak district =

Govindapur
- Village
- Country: India
- Province: Telangana
- District: Siddipet

Area
  - Total: 10.21 km^{2} (3.94 sq mi)

Population
  - Total: 2,192
- Time zone: UTC+5:30 (IST)
  - Summer (DST): +5
- Postal code: 502247

Govindapur is a small village in Doulthabad mandal of Telangana region. The village is located at a distance of 4 km from the sub-district headquarter Doulthabad, and 42 km from district headquarter Siddipet.
