= Milkha Singh =

Indian athlete (1929–2021)

Milkha Singh OLY
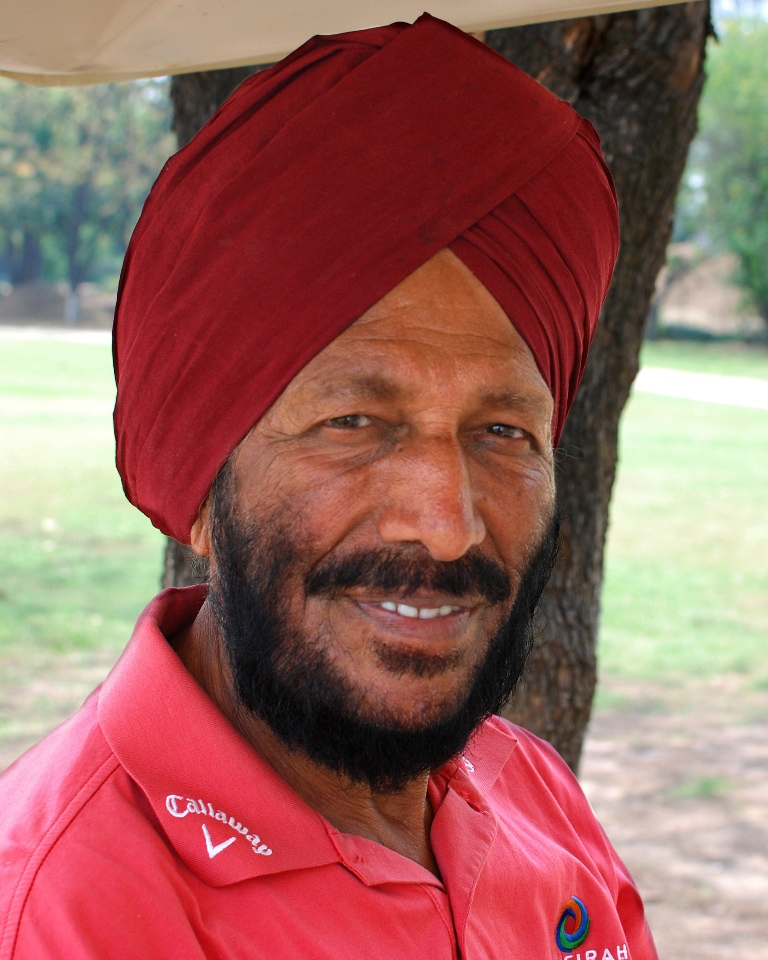
- Singh in 2012

Personal information
- Nickname: The Flying Sikh
- Nationality: Indian
- Born: Sardar Milkha Singh; 20 November 1929 Govindpura, Punjab, British India (now Punjab, Pakistan)
- Died: 18 June 2021 (aged 91) Chandigarh, India
- Occupation: Runner
- Employers: Retired; formerly of the Indian Army and Government of Punjab, India
- Spouse: Nirmal Saini (m. 1963; died 2021)
- Military career
- Allegiance: India
- Branch: Indian Army
- Service years: 1951–1964
- Rank: Honorary Captain
- Awards: Padma Shri

Sport
- Sport: Track and field
- Event: Sprinting
Medal record
Men's Athletics
Representing India
Commonwealth Games
Gold medal – first place	1958 Cardiff	440 yards
Asian Games
Gold medal – first place	1958 Tokyo	200 m
Gold medal – first place	1958 Tokyo	400 m
Gold medal – first place	1962 Jakarta	400 m
Gold medal – first place	1962 Jakarta	4 × 400 m relay
National Games of India
Gold medal – first place	1958 Cuttack	200 m
Gold medal – first place	1958 Cuttack	400 m
Silver medal – second place	1964 Calcutta	400 m

Sardar Milkha Singh (20 November 1929 – 18 June 2021), (Note: There are different records for his birth date. Records in Pakistan note it as 20 November 1929. Other records note it as 17 October 1935 and 20 November 1932. The birth date on his passport is 20 November 1932. 20 November 1929 has been used as per sources published following his death.) also known as "The Flying Sikh", was an Indian track and field sprinter who was introduced to the sport while serving in the Indian Army. He is the first Indian athlete to win gold at 400 metres at the Asian Games as well as the Commonwealth Games. He has won gold medals in the 1958 and 1962 Asian Games. He represented India in the 1956 Summer Olympics in Melbourne, the 1960 Summer Olympics in Rome and the 1964 Summer Olympics in Tokyo. Singh was awarded the Padma Shri in 1959, India's fourth-highest civilian honour, in recognition of his sporting achievements.

The race for which Singh was best remembered is his fourth-place finish in the 400 metres final at the 1960 Olympic Games, which he had entered as one of the favourites. He led the race till the 200 m mark before easing off, allowing others to pass him. Various records were broken in the race, which required a photo-finish and saw American Otis Davis being declared the winner by one-hundredth of a second over German Carl Kaufmann. Singh's fourth-place time of 45.73 seconds was the Indian national record for almost 40 years.

From beginnings that saw him orphaned and displaced during the Partition of India, Singh has become a sporting icon in his country. In 2008, journalist Rohit Brijnath described Singh as "the finest athlete India has ever produced".

Singh died from complications of COVID-19 on 18 June 2021, at the age of 91, five days after his wife, Nirmal Saini.

== Early life ==
Milkha Singh was born on 20 November 1929, into a Sikh Rathore Rajput family. His birthplace was Govindpura, a village 10 kilometres (6.2 mi) from Muzaffargarh city in Punjab Province, British India (now Kot Adu district, Pakistan). He was one of 15 siblings, eight of whom died before the Partition of India. He was orphaned during the Partition when his parents, a brother and two sisters were killed in the violence that ensued. He witnessed these killings.

Escaping the troubles in Punjab, where killings were continuing, by moving to Delhi, India, in 1947, Singh lived for a short time with the family of his married sister and was briefly imprisoned at Tihar jail for travelling on a train without a ticket. His sister, Ishvar, sold some jewellery to obtain his release. He spent some time at a refugee camp in Purana Qila and at a resettlement colony in Shahdara, both in Delhi.

Milkha became disenchanted with his life and considered becoming a dacoit (Note: Paan Singh Tomar, one of Singh's contemporaries in the Indian Army and as an athlete, did become infamous as a dacoit.) but was instead persuaded by one of his brothers, Malkhan, to attempt recruitment to the Indian Army. He successfully gained entrance on his fourth attempt, in 1951, and while stationed at the Electrical Mechanical Engineering Centre in Secunderabad and he was introduced to athletics. He had run the 10 km distance to and from school as a child and was selected by the army for special training in athletics after finishing sixth in a compulsory cross-country run for new recruits. Singh has acknowledged how the army introduced him to sport, saying that "I came from a remote village, I didn't know what running was, or the Olympics".

== International career ==
Milkha represented India in the 200 m and 400 m competitions of the 1956 Summer Olympics Games. His inexperience meant that he did not progress beyond the heat. But a meeting with the eventual 400 m champion at those Games, Charles Jenkins Sr., both inspired him to greater things and provided him with information about training methods.

In 1958, Singh set records for the 200 m and 400 m in the National Games of India, held at Cuttack, and also won gold medals in the same events at the 1958 Asian Games. He then won a gold medal in the 400 m (440 yards at this time) competition at the 1958 British Empire and Commonwealth Games with a time of 46.6 seconds. This latter achievement made him the first gold medalist at the Commonwealth Games from independent India. Before Vikas Gowda won the gold in 2014, Milkha was the only Indian male to have won an individual athletics gold medal at those Games.

Singh won the British AAA Championships title at the 1960 AAA Championships. Singh was persuaded by Jawaharlal Nehru to set aside his memories of the Partition era to race successfully in 1960 against Abdul Khaliq in Pakistan, where a post-race comment by the then General Ayub Khan led to him acquiring the nickname of The Flying Sikh. (Note: On Singh's 1960 victory over Abdul Khaliq in Pakistan, Ayub Khan, then President of Pakistan, told Singh that "You didn't run today, you flew".) Some sources say that he set a world record of 45.8 seconds in France, shortly before the Rome Olympics in the same year but the official report of the Games lists the record holder as Lou Jones, who ran 45.2 at Los Angeles in 1956. At those Olympics, he was involved in a close-run final race in the 400 m competition, where he was placed fourth. Singh had beaten all the leading contenders other than Otis Davis, and a medal had been anticipated because of his good form. However, he made an error when leading the race at 250 m, slowing down in the belief that his pace could not be sustained and looking round at his fellow competitors. Singh believes that these errors caused him to lose his medal opportunity and they are his "worst memory". Davis, Carl Kaufmann and Malcolm Spence all passed him, and a photo-finish resulted. Davis and Kaufman were both timed at a world-record breaking 44.9 seconds, while Spence and Singh went under the pre-Games Olympic record of 45.9 seconds, set in 1952 by George Rhoden and Herb McKenley, with times of 45.5 and 45.6 seconds, respectively. The Age noted in 2006 that "Milkha Singh is the only Indian to have broken an Olympic track record. Unfortunately he was the fourth man to do so in the same race" but the official Olympic report notes that Davis had already equalled the Rhoden/McKenley Olympic record in the quarter-finals and surpassed it with a time of 45.5 seconds in the semi-finals.

At the 1962 Asian Games, held in Jakarta, Singh won gold in the 400 m and in the 4 × 400 m relay. He attended the 1964 Olympic Games in Tokyo, where he was entered to compete in the 400 m, the 4 × 100 m relay and the 4 × 400 m relay. He did not take part in either the 400 m or the 4 × 100 m relay (Note: The Indian 4 × 100 m relay competitors at the 1964 Olympic Games were Anthony Coutinho, Makhan Singh, Kenneth Powell and Rajasekaran Pichaya in both the heats and semi-final, where they were eliminated from the competition.) and the Indian team of Milkha Singh, Makhan Singh, Amrit Pal and Ajmer Singh were eliminated when they finished fourth in the heat stages of the 4 × 400 m.

There have been claims that Singh won 77 of his 80 races, but these are spurious. The number of races in which he participated is not verified, nor is the number of victories, but he lost a 400 m race at the 1964 National Games in Calcutta to Makhan Singh and he did not finish first in any of his four races at the 1960 Olympic Games or the aforementioned qualification races at the 1956 Olympics.

Singh's time in the 1960 Summer Olympics 400 m final, which was run on a cinder track, set a national record that stood until 1998 when Paramjit Singh exceeded it on a synthetic track and with fully automatic timing that recorded 45.70 seconds. Although Singh's Olympic result of 45.6 seconds had been hand-timed, an electronic system at those Games had determined his record to be 45.73.

== Personal life ==
As of 2012, Singh lived in Chandigarh. He met Nirmal Saini, a former captain of the Indian women's volleyball team in Ceylon in 1955; they married in 1962 and had three daughters and a son, the tour professional golfer Jeev Milkha Singh. In 1999, they adopted the seven-year-old son of Havildar Bikram Singh, who had died in the Battle of Tiger Hill.

== Later life ==
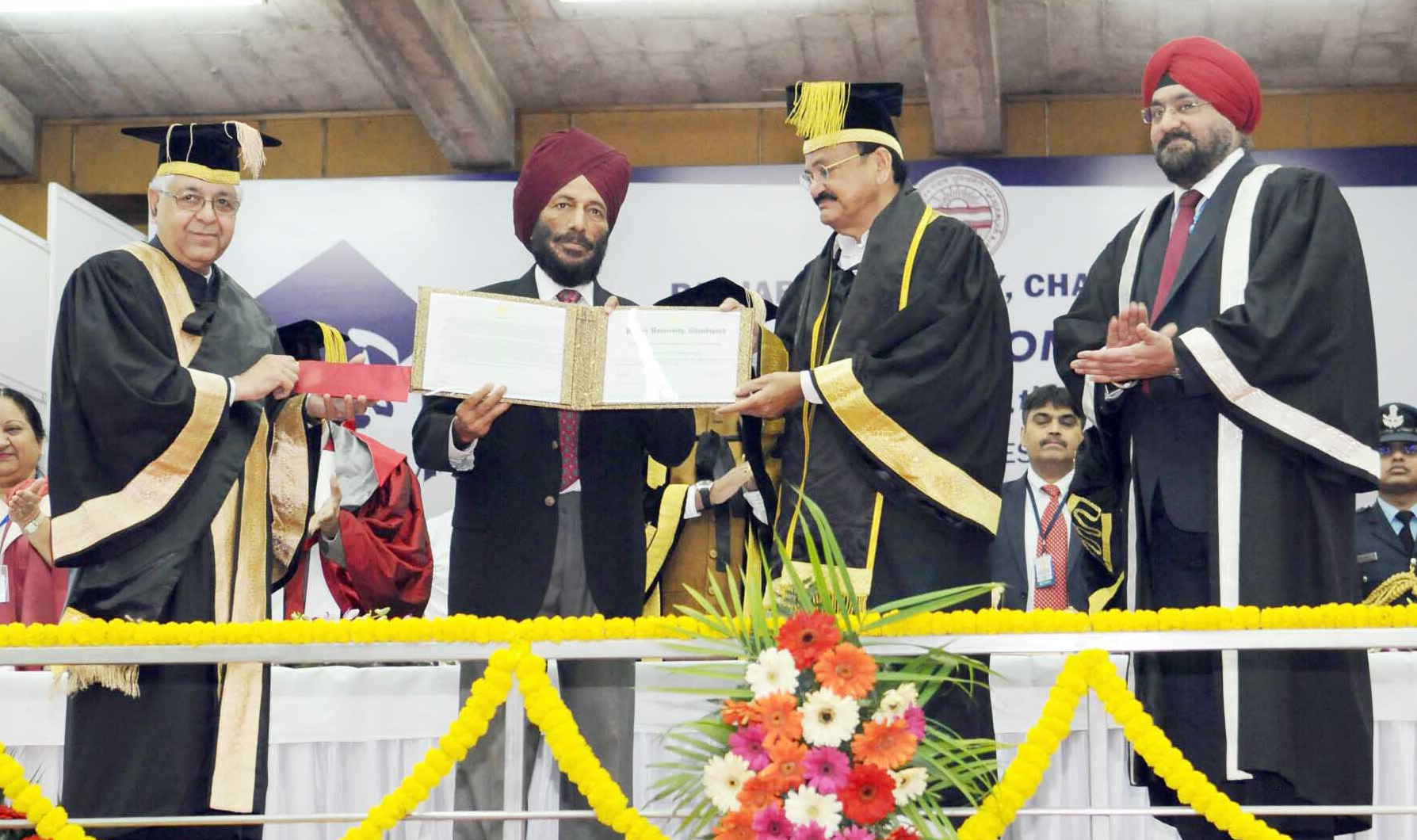
The Vice President, Shri M. Venkaiah Naidu presenting the Punjab University Khel Rattan Award to Singh (2018)

Singh was promoted from the rank of sepoy to junior commissioned officer in recognition of his successes in the 1958 Asian Games. (Note: Promotion in recognition of bringing glory to the nation continues today. Some cricketers attain the rank of honorary colonel and in 2012 Singh was outspoken in his desire to see promotion for Vijay Kumar, who had won a silver medal at the 2012 London Olympics.) He subsequently became Director of Sports in Punjab Ministry of Education, a post he retired from in 1998. Also in 1958, he was awarded the Padma Shri, India's fourth-highest civilian award, following his success in 1958.

In 2001, he turned down an offer of the Arjuna Award from the Indian government, arguing that it was intended to recognise young sports people and not those such as him. He also thought that the award was being inappropriately given to people who had little notable involvement as active sports people at all, and had become devalued. While sharing his experience in a college in Goa in 2014, he stated, "I rejected the Arjuna I was offered after I received the Padma Shri. It was like being offered an SSC [secondary school] certificate after securing a Masters degree."

All of Singh's medals have been donated to the nation. They were displayed at the Jawaharlal Nehru Stadium in New Delhi and later moved to a sports museum in Patiala, where a pair of running shoes that he wore in Rome are also displayed. In 2012, he donated the Adidas shoes that he had worn in the 1960 400 m final to be sold in a charity auction organised by actor Rahul Bose.

== Illness and Death ==
Singh was admitted to the intensive care unit at Fortis Hospital in Mohali on 24 May 2021 with pneumonia caused by COVID-19. His condition was, for a while, described as stable, but he died on 18 June 2021 at 11:30 pm in Chandigarh. His wife, Nirmal Saini, had died a few days earlier on 13 June 2021, also due to COVID-19. Singh was laid on his funeral pyre with a photo of his wife in his hands.

In November 2025, director and actor Farhan Akhtar, who portrayed Singh in Bhaag Milkha Bhaag, shared to Aap Ki Adalat host Rajat Sharma that "His daughter rang me up in Mumbai and said doctors said her father was in his last stage. I requested her to give the phone to her dad. I spoke to Milkha ji for the last time on the phone."

== Media and popular culture ==
Singh and his daughter, Sonia Sanwalka, co-wrote his autobiography, titled The Race of My Life. It was published in 2013. The book inspired Bhaag Milkha Bhaag, a 2013 biographical film of Singh's life. The film is directed by Rakeysh Omprakash Mehra, and stars Farhan Akhtar in the title role, with Sonam Kapoor, Meesha Shafi and Divya Dutta in female lead roles. The film was widely acclaimed in India and won awards including the National Film Award for Best Popular Film Providing Wholesome Entertainment at the National Film Awards, and 5 awards at the International Indian Film Academy Awards in 2014. The film made over ₹100 crores. Singh sold the movie rights for one rupee but inserted a clause stating that a share of the profits would be given to the Milkha Singh Charitable Trust. The Trust was founded in 2003 with the aim of assisting poor and needy sportspeople.

In September 2017, Singh's wax statue – created by sculptors of Madame Tussauds in London – was unveiled at Chandigarh. It depicts Singh in running posture during his victorious run at the 1958 Commonwealth Games. The statue is placed at Madame Tussauds museum in New Delhi, India. After winning India's first track and field gold medal at the 2020 Olympics, Neeraj Chopra dedicated his victory to Singh.

== Records and honours ==
=== Awards ===
Medal	Event	Category	Source
Gold	1958 Asian Games	200 m	
Gold	1958 Asian Games	400 m	
Gold	1958 Commonwealth Games	440 yards	
Gold	1962 Asian Games	400 m	
Gold	1962 Asian Games	4 × 400 m relay	
Gold	1958 Cuttack National Games	200 m	
Gold	1958 Cuttack National Games	400 m	
Silver	1964 Calcutta National Games	400 m	

=== Honours ===
Honour	Year	Source
Padma Shri	1959	
Helms World Trophy for Asia	1959	
Bharat Gaurav Award	2016	

== See also ==
- Makhan Singh (sprinter)
- List of autobiographies by Indians
- Jeev Milkha Singh

== Bibliography ==
- Singh, Milkha; Sanwalka, Sonia (2013). The Race of My Life: An Autobiography. Rupa Books. ISBN 978-8129129109.
- Biopic - Bhaag Milkha Bhaag
