= Run Raja Run (soundtrack) =

Soundtrack album by Ghibran
- Released: 15 June 2014
- Recorded: 2014
- Genre: Feature film soundtrack
- Length: 20:11
- Language: Telugu
- Label: Junglee Music
- Producer: Ghibran

Ghibran chronology
Thirumanam Enum Nikkah (2014)	Run Raja Run (2014)	Amara Kaaviyam (2014)

Run Raja Run is the soundtrack to the 2014 romantic comedy thriller film of the same name, directed by debutant Sujeeth, and starring Sharwanand, Seerat Kapoor and Adivi Sesh. The film is scored by Ghibran in his Telugu debut and featured five tracks with lyrics written by Sri Mani and Ramajogayya Sastry. The soundtrack album was distributed by Junglee Music and released on 15 June 2014.

== Development ==
Sujeeth had listened to Ghibran's compositions for Vaagai Sooda Vaa (2011) and liked his work using one of the film's songs as his mobile ringtone. When the producer Uppalapati Pramod was in search of the music director for Run Raja Run, Sujeeth recommended Ghibran's name, with the producer also liking his work in Naiyaandi (2013). Eventually, the director, producer along with cinematographer R. Madhi went to Chennai, where the composer was working on the music for Kamal Haasan's Uttama Villain (2015).

Ghibran, who wanted to compose music for a Telugu film and also something with an urban flavor, accepted their proposal. Sujeeth was interested on providing something refreshing and new, that allowed him to provide more creative freedom for the album. The five-song soundtrack consisted of a multitude of genres—a fast-paced number, a melody, a pub song and two of them which were different genres. Ramajogayya Sastry wrote lyrics for three songs and Sri Mani wrote the other two songs. The lyricists listened to the director puts and provided them in a short span of time.

== Release ==
The film's soundtrack album was released on 15 June 2014 at a promotional event held at Gokaraju Rangaraju Institute of Engineering and Technology in Hyderabad. Along with the film's cast and crew, Prabhas felicitated the event as the chief guests, and unveiled the audio CDs to Pramod. The album was distributed and marketed by Junglee Music in digital and physical formats.

== Critical reception ==
The film's soundtrack received positive reviews from critics. The Times of India wrote "All in all, the album has peculiar compositions and Ghibran delivers promising tracks with refreshing feel mainly targeted at youth" and rated the soundtrack three out of five stars. IndiaGlitz wrote "The album has got a quirky side to it [...] Watch out the presentation on the screen as much as the songs." Vipin Nair of Music Aloud rated 7.5 out of 10 and wrote "Ghibran's Telugu debut isn't as exquisite as his Tamil repertoire, but there are a couple of tracks which demonstrate the composer's class."

Karthik Srinivasan, in his review for Milliblog, wrote "Ghibran's trademark style is intact here, but that's also starting to seem like what is pulling the album down at times." Critic based at Sify described the music as "impressive" and Suresh Kavirayani of Deccan Chronicle highlighted it as another major plus points of the film. Analyzing the trends of Telugu film music in the past decade, Krishna Sripada of The Hindu mentioned the album and described it "equally delicious" due to its urbane sounds.

== Track listing ==
Run Raja Run (Original Motion Picture Soundtrack) track listing
No.	Title	Lyrics	Artist(s)	Length
1.	"Bujjiamma Bujjiamma"	Sri Mani	Gold Devaraj	3:31
2.	"Coma Coma Coma"	Ramajogayya Sastry	Kunal Ganjawala, Yazin Nizar	3:39
3.	"Rajadhi Rajanappa"	Sri Mani	Thomas Andrews	3:56
4.	"Vasthava Vasthava (Shanthi Om Shanthi)"	Ramajogayya Sastry	Clinton Cerejo, Maya Iyer	4:30
5.	"Vadhantune Nenu Vadhantune"	Ramajogayya Sastry	Chinmayi	4:35
Total length:				20:11

== Accolades ==
Accolades for Run Raja Run (Original Motion Picture Soundtrack)
Award (Note: Awards are in alphabetical order.)	Date of ceremony (Note: Date is linked to the article about the awards held that year, wherever possible.)	Category	Recipient(s)	Result	Ref.
Filmfare Awards South	26 June 2015	Best Music Director – Telugu	Ghibran	Nominated	
Mirchi Music Awards South	23 July 2015	Album of the Year – Telugu	Run Raja Run	Nominated	
Mirchi Music Awards South	23 July 2015	Lyricist of the Year – Telugu	Ramajogayya Sastry – ("Vadhantune Nenu Vadhantune")	Nominated	
Mirchi Music Awards South	23 July 2015	Male Vocalist of the Year – Telugu	Gold Devaraj – ("Bujjiamma Bujjiamma")	Nominated	
Mirchi Music Awards South	23 July 2015	Female Vocalist of the Year – Telugu	Chinmayi – ("Vadhantune Nenu Vadhantune")	Nominated	
South Indian International Movie Awards	6–7 August 2015	Best Music Director – Telugu	Ghibran	Nominated	
South Indian International Movie Awards	6–7 August 2015	Best Male Playback Singer – Telugu	Gold Devaraj – ("Bujjiamma Bujjiamma")	Nominated	
South Indian International Movie Awards	6–7 August 2015	Best Female Playback Singer – Telugu	Chinmayi – ("Vadhantune Nenu Vadhantune")	Nominated	
