= Govindapuram, Palakkad =

Village in Kerala, India

Govindapuram
- village
- Location in Kerala, India Govindapuram (India)
- Coordinates: 10.6118°N 76.8137°E
- Country: India
- State: Kerala
- District: Palakkad

Languages
  - Official: Malayalam, English
- Time zone: UTC+5:30 (IST)
- Vehicle registration: KL-70

Govindapuram is a small village in Kollengode Block, Palakkad district of Kerala, India. The postal area pin code is 678507.

In November 2024, it was reported that several persons from Govindapuram were crushed to death in an accident in Nattika.
