= Nirmal Saini =

Indian volleyball player (1938–2021)

- Born: Nirmal Saini; 8 October 1938; Sheikhupura, Punjab, British India (present-day Punjab, Pakistan)
- Died: 13 June 2021 (aged 82); Mohali, India
- Occupation: Volleyball player
- Employer: Captain of the India women's national volleyball team
- Spouse: Milkha Singh (m. 1963)
- Children: 5; including Jeev Milkha Singh

Nirmal Saini also known as Nirmal Milkha Singh(8 October 1938 – 13 June 2021) was an Indian volleyball player and captain of the India women's national volleyball team. She was the wife of athlete Milkha Singh and the mother of Jeev Milkha Singh.

== Biography ==
She was born in Sheikhupura, Punjab (now part of Pakistan)She was Director of Sports for Women in the State Department. She graduated from Panjab University with a master's degree in Political Science in 1958.

== Personal life ==
Nirmal Saini met Milkha Singh in 1955 in Colombo, Sri Lanka, during a sports tournament. The then Chief Minister of Punjab Partap Singh Kairon persuaded her father to give his consent. They married in 1962. .The couple have 3 daughters and a son, golfer Jeev Milkha Singh and lived in Chandigarh. In 1999, they adopted the seven-year-old son of Havildar Bikram Singh, who had died in the Battle of Tiger Hill.

She died on 13 June 2021, in Mohali, due to COVID-19 complications; her husband died five days later, also from the virus.
