= Govindpura, Pakistan =

Govindpura بستی بخاریان
- Basti Bukhari
- Location within Punjab, Pakistan Location within Pakistan
- Coordinates: 30.447653°N 70.922914°E
- Country: Pakistan
- Province: Punjab
- Elevation: 177 m (581 ft)
- Time zone: UTC+5 (PST)

Govindpura (officially Basti Bukhari) is a village in the Kot Addu, Muzaffargarh, Punjab province of Pakistan. The village was renamed as Basti Bukharian, after Partition of India.

Famous Indian athlete Milkha Singh was born in this village before Partition of India.
