= Govindpura, Bhopal =

Govindpura
- locality
- Location in Bhopal
- Coordinates: 23°12′34″N 77°26′52″E
- Country: India
- State: Madhya Pradesh
- District: Bhopal
- City: Bhopal

Government
  - Body: Bhopal Municipal Corporation
- Time zone: UTC+5:30 (IST)
- Pincode: 462024
- Telephone: +91755
- Vehicle registration: MP-04-

Govindpura (Hindi: गोविन्दपुरा) is an area in the BHEL township in the city of Bhopal, India. It falls in the Govidpura Assembly constituency.

== Etymology ==
In Sanskrit, Govindpura means the place of Govind, one of the names of Lord Krishna, a Hindu deity.

== Points of interest ==
=== Restaurants ===
Govindpura has many roadside dhabas and small eating places.

=== Temples ===
Govindpura has the Sree Narayana Guru Mandir. The members of the Sree Narayana Mission observe the Mahasamadhi of Jagatguru Sree Narayana every year.

=== Schools ===
- Hema School
- Gandhi School
- Government Girls High School
- Vidya Niketan
- Raman Higher Secondary School
- St John's School
- Carmel Convent Senior Secondary Girls School

== Getting there and orientation ==
The easiest way to get to Govindpura is to board one of the private buses that run in Bhopal. Auto rickshaws are also a very popular mode of transport.

== Industrial estate ==
Govindpura has a sprawling industrial estate that comprises mainly ancillary industries to BHEL.
