= Gobindpur, Khunti =

Gobindpur
- Village
- Location in Jharkhand, India Gobindpur (India)
- Coordinates: 23.0765°N 84.9944°E
- Country: India
- State: Jharkhand
- District: Khunti district

Population (2011)
  - Total: 2,499

Languages*
  - Official: Hindi, Urdu
- Time zone: UTC+5:30 (IST)
- Vehicle registration: JH

Gobindpur is a village located in southern part of Karra block, Khunti district. It is 50 kilometres from Ranchi, the capital of Jharkhand state.

== Geography ==
Cities, towns and locations in Khunti district in South Chotanagpur Division
M: municipality, CT: census town, R: rural/ urban centre, T: tourist centre
Owing to space constraints in the small map, the actual locations in a larger map may vary slightly

=== Location ===
Gobindpur is located at 23.0765°N 84.9944°E.

Geographically, Govindpur Road is located on southern part of the Chota Nagpur Plateau which forms the eastern edge of the Deccan Plateau system. The North Karo River and its tributaries constitute the local river system. The local tributaries includes Chhata River, Kurid nala and Fulco

=== Area overview ===
In the adjacent map the area shown is “undulating and covered with hills, hillocks and jungles (jungles/ forests are shown as shaded area in the map). The soil of the area is rocky, sandy and red loam upland. There are paddy fields only in the depressions. It has a gentle slope adjacent to the streams.” A major part of the district is in the altitude range of 500–700 metres (1,600–2,300 ft), with up to ± 200 m for some parts. In 2011, it had a density of population of 210 persons per sq km. Khunti is an overwhelmingly rural district with 91.5% of the population living in rural areas. Famous places in this area are Ulihatu, the birth place of Bhagwan Birsa Munda, and Dombari Buru, the central point of his activity.

Note: The map alongside presents some of the notable locations in the district. All places marked in the map are linked in the larger full screen map.

== Geology ==
Geologically, it belongs to the Archean age of granite gneiss formation. Other include amphibolite, khondalite and mica schist.

== Climate ==
Govindpur Road has a subtropical climate. Temperatures range from maximum 42 to 25 °C during summer, and a minimum 18 to 4 °C during winter. The annual rainfall is about 1240 millimeters.

== Demographics ==
According to the 2011 Census of India, Gobindpur had a total population of 2,499, of which 1,294 (52%) were males and 1,209 (48%) were females. Population in the age range 0–6 years was 342. The total number of literate persons in Gobindpur was 1,742 (80.76% of the population over 6 years).

(*For language details see Karra block#Language and religion)

== Transport ==
There is a station at Govindpur Road on the Hatia–Rourkela line.

== Education ==
- Primary school - Govt. Primary school Jamhar, Govt. Primary School Jalanga.
- Middle school - Govt. Middle School Dehkela, D.A.V. school Govindpur Road.
- High School. - Govt. Kisan High School Dehkela.

== Healthcare ==
There is a Primary Health Centre in Gobindpur.

== Trade ==
The trade of local goods such as Mahua, Tamarind, Madua (ragi), Dhan (paddy) and sakar kand. These commodities are supplied wholesale markets in Ranchi as well as to other places.
