= Govindpur, Allahabad =

Also a place near Gwalior, Madhya Pradesh

Govindpur is one of the oldest colonies in India established by Prayagraj Development Authority in 1981 at the bank of the river Ganges.

== Geography ==
The approximate area of the colony is 1.5 km^{2}. It is situated on a plateau which protects it from the frequent floods of the river Ganges. It has four levels of residential structures, EWS (economically weaker section), LIG (lower income group), MIG (middle income group) and HIG (higher income group)—representing a typical socio-economic class structure in India. It also comprises plots which gives it a more elegant look.

== Transportation ==
It is very well connected by local transport with the rest of the city with indigenous developed vehicles called Vikram. It is also supported by private and government bus services called Mahanagri and UPSRTC.

== Facilities ==
The main markets are Aashiyana market, Jeeshan market. There are two Durga Puja Parks here. The prime shopping place in Govindpur is at Zeeshan market where various kinds of shops ranging from general store to gift shops can be found.

Nearby localities are Chandpur, Salori, Bhulai Ka Purwa, Shivpuri and Shivkuti.

There are a number of medical stores in Govindpur. A number of roadside shops serve fast foods. Photostate printout shop also available.

== Nearby places ==
Places to visit in Govindpur include Shivkuti Temple, one of the oldest temples of India which houses a Shiv Kaccheri which has thousands of shivlings and is of high importance to Shiv devotees. The Narayan Ashram is another such place which houses three temples in inside a huge lush green campus, which is a great outing spot for local residents. Also the famous, Motilal Nehru National Institute of Technology, one of the 30 NIT's of India is situated just one and a half kilometres from Govindpur colony.

About 14.2 km from sangam "In Hindu tradition Triveni Sangam is the 'confluence' of three rivers. Sangama is the Sanskrit word for confluence. The point of confluence is a sacred place for Hindus".
