= Cinema of Jharkhand =

Film industry in the Indian state of Jharkhand

In the Indian state of Jharkhand, films are produced in various regional and tribal languages including Kudmali, Hindi, Bengali, Nagpuri, Khortha and Santali. Film industry in state of Jharkhand is also known as Jhollywood.

Since 2015, Government of Jharkhand is encouraging film shooting in State to highlight the natural beauty, religious place, culture of the state as well as to produce jobs by giving subsidy to film makers. New government of Congress-JMM alliance ended subsidy for regional cinema after coming to power in 2020.

In recent years several Hindi films have been shot in the state including M.S. Dhoni: The Untold Story, A Death in the Gunj, Ajab singh ki gajab kahani, Ranchi Diaries, Begum Jaan, Panchlait and Ilaka Kishoreganj. Several Nagpuri films have been produced in the recent years including Tor Bina, Mahuaa, Tor Chahat Mein, Mor Gaon Mor Desh and Phulmania.

The upcoming hindi film Lohardaga will show issue of Naxalism and surrender policy in the State. The state also showcased in web and T.V series, e.g - Netflix's Jamtara - Sabka Number Ayega and Hoichoi's Dhanbad Blues. Ekta Kapoor T.V series, Kuch Toh Hai Tere Mere Darmiyan was based on Jamshedpur.

== History ==
The first feature film of Jharkhand was Aakarant directed by Vinod Kumar and made under the banner of drishyantar international, 1988. The first Nagpuri film was Sona Kar Nagpur (1992) produced and directed by Dhananjay Nath Tiwari.

== Hindi films shot in Jharkhand ==
- Kala Patthar, an Amitabh Bachchan starrer cult film was based on Chasnala mining disaster of 1975
- Satyakam, a Dharmendra & Sharmila Tagore starrer film, shot in Ghatsila.
- Hip Hip Hurray, a directorial debut film of Prakash Jha, shot at Ranchi & hill station, Netarhat
- Udaan, a masterpiece screened at Cannes film festival, shot at Jamshedpur
- A Death In The Gunj, a Konkana Sen Sharma starrer movie shot at McCluskieganj.
- Gangs of Wasseypur, part 1 & 2, based on coal mafia feuds of Dhanbad
- M.S. Dhoni: The Untold Story, biopic of M.S. Dhoni, shot at Ranchi and Jamshedpur
- Bubble Gum, directed by Sanjivan Lal and shot at Jamshedpur
- Begum Jaan, a multi-starrer film shot at Rajmahal (Sahebganj) and Dumka
- Panchlait, based on Phanishwar Nath 'Renu''s story, shot at Deoghar
- Ajab Singh Ki Gajab Kahani, biopic of Ajay Singh, a handicapped IRS officer from Jharkhand
- Ranchi Diaries, a film starring Himansh Kohli shot at Ranchi
- Koyelaanchal, a Suniel Shetty and Vinod Khanna starrer film shot in Hazaribagh & Ramgarh
- Aadhaar, a Vineet Kumar starrer comedy film
- Raahgir -The Wayfarers, an Adil Hussain starrer film shot in Ranchi & hill station, Netarhat
- Sab Kushal Mangal, starring Akshaye Khanna, debut of Priyaank Sharma & Riva Kishan shot in Ranchi
- One Day: Justice Delivered, an Anupam Kher & Esha Gupta starrer film shot in Ranchi
- Gaon, an Omkar Das Manikpuri & Shishir Sharma starrer film based on original story
- Ilaka Kishoreganj, film shot in Jharkhand
- Ramrajya, a Govind Namdeo and Aman Preet Singh (brother of Rakul Preet Singh) starrer film, shot in Bokaro & Ranchi
- Dil Bechara (earlier, Kizie or Manny), a Sushant Singh Rajput starrer film, shot at Jamshedpur
- Nastik, an upcoming film starring Arjun Rampal, shot in Daltonganj
- Banana, film directed by John Abraham & shot in Jamshedpur
- Bansuri: The Flute, an Anurag Kashyap & Rituparna Sengupta starrer film
- Birsa Munda, an upcoming biopic Hindi film directed by Tamil film director Pa. Ranjith.
- Aa Bhi Ja O Piya, a Dev Sharma and Smriti Kashyap's debut starrer film
- Nukkad Naatak, a 2024 Hindi film written & directed by Tanmaya Shekhar. The film was shot in IIT (ISM) Dhanbad.

== Bengali films shot in Jharkhand ==
- Subarnarekha, a film directed by Ritwik Ghatak.
- Ajantrik, a film directed by Ritwik Ghatak.
- Aranyer Din Ratri, a Satyajit Ray directorial film shot in Palamu region
- Oskar, a Priyanshu Chatterjee and Aparajita Adhya starring film
- Agni Pariksha, an Uttam Kumar and Suchitra Sen starrer film shot at Topchanchi.
- Chhuti, directorial debut of Arundhati Devi and based on Bimal Kar's Kharkuto
- Byomkesh O Durgo Rahasya, a Birsa Dasgupta directorial film starring Dev and Rukmini Maitra

== Film shootings of other industries ==
- Ranchi, a Kannada film starring Prabhu Mundkur and Tota Roy Chowdhury.
- Rupinder Gandhi 2 : The Robinhood, a Dev Kharoud and Jagjeet Sandhu starrer Punjabi film, shot at Ranchi

== Notable people of Jharkhand cinema ==
=== Directors and producers ===
- Imtiaz Ali, well known Hindi film director
- Amit Bose, Indian film director & editor
- Sriram Dalton, Indian film producer & director
- Pankaj Dubey, Indian screenwriters
- Raj Kumar Gupta, Indian film director
- Sanjivan Lal, Indian film director
- Akashaditya Lama, Indian director & screenwriter
- Aseem Mishra, Indian cinematographer
- Bikas Mishra, Indian film director
- Shomu Mukherjee, Indian director, producer & writer
- Prem Prakash Modi, Indian filmmaker, actor & writer
- Manish Mundra, Indian film producer
- Nandlal Nayak, film director & music composer
- Zeishan Quadri, director, actor & writer
- Lal Vijay Shahdeo, Indian film writer, director & producer
- Gul Bahar Singh, Indian filmmaker
- Biju Toppo, Indian documentary filmmaker

=== Actors ===
- Krishna Bhardwaj, Indian T.V actor
- Samit Bhanja, Bengali film actor
- Bibhu Bhattacharya, Bengali film actor
- Meiyang Chang, Indian actor & singer
- Dipankar De, Bengali film actor
- Dinesh Deva, Nagpuri actor and dancer
- Raman Gupta, Nagpuri and Khortha film actor
- Rajesh Jais, Indian film & T.V actor
- Sanjeev Jaiswal, Indian actor
- Neeraj Kabi, Indian actor
- Deepak Lohar, Nagpuri film actor
- R. Madhavan, Indian actor, writer & producer
- Vikram Singh, Indian actor
- Imran Zahid, Indian theatre actor

=== Actresses ===
- Pratyusha Banerjee, former T.V actress
- Priyanka Chopra, actress, singer, producer and former Miss World
- Deeba, Pakistani film actress
- Rasika Dugal, Indian actress
- Ishita Dutta, Indian film & T.V actress
- Tanushree Dutta, Indian film actress & former Miss India
- Auritra Ghosh, Indian film & theatre actress
- Komal Jha, Indian film actress
- Supriya Kumari, television actress
- Shweta Basu Prasad, Indian film & T.V actress
- Amrita Raichand, Indian actress
- Meenakshi Seshadri, former Indian film actress
- Sheena Shahabadi, Indian film actress
- Pooja Singh, Indian T.V actress
- Simone Singh, Indian film & T.V actress
- Reecha Sinha, Indian film actress
- Sumann, Indian actress
- Tania, Punjabi film actress

== Award ==
- Jharkhand International Film Festival Awards

== See also ==
- Cinema of India
- Khortha cinema
- Nagpuri cinema
- Santali cinema
