= List of Nagpuri films =

This is a list of notable Nagpuri films produced in the Nagpuri language, spoken mostly in the Indian states of Jharkhand, Chhattisgarh, Odisha and West Bengal.

== 1990s ==
Year	Film	Director	Producer	Cast	Ref.
1992	Sona Kar Nagpur	Dhananjay Nath Tiwari	Dhananjay Nath Tiwari	Purushottam Tiwari Sosan Bara; Pushpa Kullu; Mukund Nayak	
1992	Koda Mait Jabe	Dr. Yuagal Kishore Mishra		Tarun Nayak	
1994	Piya Kar Gaon	Baiju Sonar	Anant Tanti (Bhanjo)	Jyotindra Rathoud, Kamal Krishna, Sunaina Sagar, Kumar Kancha & Rakesh G Bhatt	
1995	Preet	Ravi Chaudhary	Tara Mani Devi		
1998	Sajna Anari	Pravir Ganguli	Yugal Kishore Mishra		

== 2000s ==
Year	Film	Director	Producer	Cast	Ref.
2001	Gooiya no.1	Abhas Sharma	Abhas Sharma	Sana; Srikant; Saroj Jha; Umar Mukherjee.	
2001	Mor Pratigya	Ravi Chaudhary	Ravi Chaudhary		
2003	Tuar	Dr. Uma Shankar Jha	Hosne Oraon		
2004	Hamaar Jharkhand	Vijay Prakash	Vijay Prakash		
2004	Mitwa Pardeshi	Bapa Bandyopadhyay, Anil Sikdar	Awadh Kishore		
2004	Mor Dil	Binesh Raj	Hosne Oraon		
2005	Sun Sajna	Rajiv Sinha	Shahid	Raman Gupta; Kanchan Roy	
2005	Pyaar to Hoe Gelak	Y.K. Mishra	Y.K. Mishra		
2005	Maksad	Raghunath Mahto	Raghunath Mahto		
2005	Aawara Tore Pyaar Mein	Pankaj Sinha		Pankaj Sinha; Supriya Kumari; Jharna Chakravarthy; Sukumar Mukherjee; Shuvra Mazumdar	
2005	Hili Maa	Krishna Sarthi	Krishna Sarthi		
2005	Sangiya	Vijay Prakash	Vijay Prakash		
2005	Mukti	Ram Nayak	Ram Nayak		
2006	Nagpur Kar Bhoot	Yadhunath Mahto	Yadhunath Mahto	Dinesh Deva; Rajesh Kushwaha; Kanchan Roy; Monika Ghosh; Raghunath Mahto; Birju Pradhan	
2006	Roop Tor	Birju Pradhan	Birju Pradhan		
2006	Chingaari		Jaychand		
2007	Jugni	Y.K. Mishra	Y.K. Mishra		
2008	Chahat			Varsha Rittu Lakra	
2008	Jharkhand Kar Chhalia	Anil Sikdaar		Deepak Lohar	
2008	Pyaar Kar Khatir	Ashok Chauhan	Mohan Singh		
2008	Gangaa Par	Manoj Singh Surya	Manoj Singh Surya		
2009	Chhoti				
2009	Baha	Sriprakash		Pradyuman Nayak; Yogendra Choubey; Usha Mishra; Bobby; , Sheetal Bage; Ashok Pagal; Raj Kumar Nagbansi; Mahadev Toppo; , Rana benarjee; Shubhra Majumdar; Remish Kandulan	

== 2010s ==
Key
†	Denotes films that have not yet been released

Year	Film	Director	Producer	Cast	Ref.
2011	Karma	Rajiv Sinha	Raj Kasera	Deepak Lohar; Varsha Rittu Lakra; Ajay Soni	
2011	Pyaar Kar Mehndi Rachaye Liyo Re	Archana Verma; Santosh Singh	Sanjay Kumar		
2011	Pyaar Ka Sapna	Pappu Khan	Shahid		
2011	Naari Kar Dil Aaesane Hoeyle	Sailja Bala	Bharti Bhusan		
2011	Hai Re Mor Jharkhand	Lekhraj Mahto	Hosne Oraon		
2012-13	Maut Kar Chehra	Mohammad Asfak Ansari	Iqbal		
2012-13	Pyaar Aur Mohabbat	Ram Nayak	Ram Nayak		
2012-13	Kanhi E Pyaar To Na Laage	Jairam Mahto	Kansilala Nayak		
2012-13	Ye Sajni	Deepak Lohar	Amit Munda		
2015	Belura	Y.K. Mishra	Y.K. Mishra		
2017	Chandni Tor Pyar Mei	Pappu Khan		Sohail Azad; Javed Manan; Monica; Sunil; Manju Tiwary	
2017	Tor Bina	Dipen Toppo		Joy Bose; Binod Mahalee; Kajal Singh; Neeraj Vats	
2017	Mahuua	Sanjay Verma	Satyen Srivastava	Stefy Patel; Prince Sondhi; Ali Khan; Manoj Verma; Shakti Singh; Punam Singh; Dinesh Dewa; Kajal Singh; Raj Sinha; Ajay Ghosh	
2017	Mor Sangee	Probin Lakra		Divya Kalar; D.R. Lakra; G.D. Nag	
2017	Hi-fi Laila Dehati Chaila	Arvind Minj	Hasne Oraon		
2018	Mor Gaon Mor Desh	Ashwini Kumar		Deepak Sinha; Chandan Kumar Jaiswal; Rishi Prakash Mishra; Payal Mukherjee; Varsha Rittu Lakra	
2018	Tor Pyar Mein	Pritam Lohar	Binod Mahli	Binod Mahli; Laxmi Pandey; Neeraj Vats	
2018	Mati Kar Lal	Ram Nayak			
2018	Mohai Jangal	Sandeep Sinha		Lalit Kumar; Javed; Sonalii Kumari; Dipali Kumari; Gaurav Kumar; Jitendra Kumar	
2018	Mor Pratigya	Dipen Toppo, Sumit Sachdeva		Prateek Jaiswal; Lakshmi Pandey; Varsha Rittu; Dharmendra Kumar; Kunal Bharti; Niraj Vats; Maya Pandey; Manoj Sahri; Ziauddin Khan; Shankar Pathak; Guru Bhai	
2019	Phulmania	Lal Vijay Shahdeo	Lal Vijay Shahdeo	Komal Singh; Vineet Kumar; Nitu Pande; Khusboo Sharma; Ravi Bhattia; Hansraj Jagtap	
2019	Dewa Rikhawala	Sanjay Verma		Raman Gupta; Raza Murad; Avinab Kumar; Shahi Bhusan; Varsha Rittu Lakra	
2019	Dhumkkudiya (film) †	Nandlal Nayak	Sumit Agarwal	Rinkal Kacchap; Pradhuman Nayak; Rajesh Jais; Subrat Dutta; Vinod Anand; Varsa Lakra; Gita Guha	
2020	Sapne Sajan Ke †	Adhir Raj		Satish Shahdeo; Akshay Raj; Anuska Soni; Pradeep Raja	
2020	Dadagiri †			Ram Nayak; Sugandha Singh; Deepak Lohar; Manoj Singh; Angel Lakra; Manoj Azad; Rajkumar Nagvanshi; Pintu Sinha; Yash Nayak; Anand Baraik; Krusna Singh; Kashilal; Md. Islam; Sultan; Priya Kumari	
2020	Gangwa †	Aditya Kumar		Bunty Singh; Raman Gupta; Dinesh Deva; Deepak; Ranjeet; Hemant Birje; Angel Lakra; Varsha Rittu Lakra	
2020	Adivasi Khiladi	Probin Lakra		Bijoya Kerketta; Sujit Lakra; Joya Minj	
2020	Tor Bina 2 †	Balal Guru		Binod Mahli; Divya Kalar; D.R. Lakra	
2020	Temper†	D Bipin		Binod Mahli; Mahendra Gaur; Anamika	

== 2020s ==
Year	Film	Director	Producer	Cast	Ref.
2021	Ranchi Romeo	Deepak Lohar		Deepak Lohar; Prabha Sarkar	
2022	Dehleej	NPK Purushotam aka Purushottam Kumar	Yatendra Mishra	Ayushi Bhadra; Roshan Saurabh Sharma; Sukanth Thakur; Sankar Pathak; Priya Murmu; Shital Chhaya Kerketta; Aruni Jha; Ashok Gope	
2022	Karma Dharma	Pappu Khan	Bani Mahto, Devendra Kumar	Dinesh Deva; Kailash Jackson; Monu Raj; Varsha Rittu Lakra; Shivani; Poonam Singh; Mukund Nayak; Devdas Vishwakarma	released on YouTube
2022	Mor Sangi Re I Love You	Naveen Kerketta	Naveen Kerketta	Ravi Sahu; Lovly Ahmed; Mohan Joshi; Ali Khan; Pradeep Kabra	Trilingual film Dulhan Chahi Bihar se in Bhojpuri, Te Mor Jan in Chhattisgarhi
2022	Har Janam †		Anil Jate, Rohit RK	Rohit RK; Muskan Moolchandani; Neeraj Vats; Kunal Bharati; Chandni Baraik	
2023	Nasoor	Rajiv Sinha	Rajiv Sinha	Vivek Nayak; Shivani Gupta; Vinay Kumar; Chitra Mukherjee; Prakash Pathak; Sukumar Mukherjee	
2024	Jatra:Ek Prem Katha			Deepak Lohar; Chandni Baraik; Madhu Mansuri Hansmukh; Kunal Bharti; Manju Tiwari	
2024	Panchayat kar khela	Ashok Mahto	Ashok Mahto	Ashok Mahto; Raman Gupta; Rajiv Sinha; Monika Mundu; Arpita Das; Kumar Saurabh; Ram babu; Sani Thakur; Deepak Choudhary; Ashok Gope; Varsha; Ranjit Bihari; Indrajit Singh; Namita Simgh	
2024	Khota Sikka	Bibhas Khalkho; Anjali Rupam Kujur	Anmol Khalkho; David Sam	Vivek Nayak; Nitesh Kachhap; Raju Tirky; Ranju Minz; Narayan Mahli; Chandni Baraik; Arpita Das; Manita; Ankita; Deepali; Satish Shahdeo; Neeraj Vats; Arojit Lohara	
2024	I Love You	Mukesh Giri	Vishal Verma	Vivek Nayak; Amrata Pal; Nitesh Kachhap; Raju Minz; Rajlaxmi Bhengra	
2026	Sereng	NPK Purushotam		Vivek Nayak; Nitesh Kachhap; Shweta Prajapati; Kajal Kundu; Salib Samir Minz; Salomi Tirkey	

== See also ==
- Nagpuri cinema
