= Nagpuri cinema =

Films produced in the Nagpuri language

Nagpuri cinema refers to films produced in the Nagpuri language in state of Jharkhand.

== History ==
The first Nagpuri feature film was Sona Kar Nagpur (1992) which was produced and directed by Dhananjay Nath Tiwari.

Since then, several films have been produced. Nagpuri cinema faces several challenges such as lack of funds and infrastructure, as most audiences reside in villages. Cinema halls are shutting down in the present day. It is also difficult to release nagpuri films in cinema halls due to the high cost. Despite all these, several films are produced per year and few get released in cinema halls.

== Notable films ==
Year	Film	Director	Cast	Notes				
1994	PIYA KAR GAON	Baiju Sonar	Jyotindra Rathoud; Kamal Krishna; Sunaina Sagar; Kumar Kancha & Rakesh G Bhatt	2018	Mahuua	Sanjay Verma; Avishek Anand	Stefy Patel; Prince Sondhi; Ali Khan; Manoj Verma; Shakti Singh; Dinesh Deva	Won best Nagpuri film Award of 2018 in Jharkhand international Film festival
2018	Mor Gaon Mor Desh	Ashwini Kumar	Deepak Sinha; Chandan Kumar Jaiswal; Rishi Prakash Mishra; Payal Mukherjee; Varsha Rittu Lakra					
2019	Phulmania	Lal Vijay Shahdeo	Komal Singh; Hansraj Jagtap; Vineet Kumar; Ravi Bhatia; Monika Mundu	Premiered at Jharkhand International Film Festival Awards (JIFFA) 2019 and the 72nd Cannes Film Festival in France				
2019	Dhumkkudiya	Nandlal Nayak	Rinkal Kacchap; Pradhuman Nayak; Rajesh Jais; Subrat Dutta; Nikhhil R khera; Varsha Rittu Lakra	Won more than 60 awards around the world				
2023	Nasoor	Rajiv Sinha	Vivek Nayak; Shivani Gupta; Vivek Kumar Awasth; Prakash Pathak; Manoj Verma; Arti Mishra; Sukumar Mukherjee; Chitra Mukherjee					

== Notable people ==
=== Actor ===
- Dinesh Deva
- Raman Gupta
- Deepak Lohar
- Mukund Nayak

=== Actress ===
- Supriya Kumari

=== Director ===
- Nandlal Nayak
- Lal Vijay Shahdeo

=== Singer ===
- Monika Mundu
- Pankaj

== See also ==
- Khortha cinema
- Cinema of Jharkhand
