= Khortha cinema =

Khortha-language films of Jharkhand, India

Khortha cinema refers to films produced in the Khortha language in the Indian state of Jharkhand.

== History ==
Khortha cinema was predated in the 1990s by a growing interest in Khortha music. Widespread interest emerged around 1997 to 1998, when the song "Phoolal Phoolal Rotiya" by singer Gautam Kumar Mahato became a hit. After the partition of Jharkhand in 2000, competition increased. The first Khortha music studio was established in Katras under the name Deshwali Studio. The second studio was established in Nirsa under the name Lovely Music. The third studio was called The Music Company. Lens Music then followed.

=== Film ===
In the mid-2000s, the CD and DVD business crashed. Looking to transfer the interest in Khortha art to other media, filmmakers were inspired to shoot films in Jharkhand. The first feature film shot in Jharkhand was filmed in Kota, and is titled Jharkhandi Hero. After its release, several other films followed: Pyar kar khatir, Hamer dehati babu, Gaon ke gori, and Goriya tor kariya.

== Film ==
- Jharkhandi Hero (2007): notable as the first Khortha film.
- Litia Dhunda (2008)
- Goria Tor Kirya (2008)
- Hamar Dehati babu (2008)
- Day debo jan gori (2009)
- Sajan (2015)
- Chauranga (2016)
- Gaon (2018)
- Jharkhandek Mati (2018)
- Pita ka maan Betiyan (2019): first khortha short film
- Gaon ke gori (2006): short film.
- Naxalite (2019)

== Notables ==
=== Writers ===
- Anand Kishore Dangi

=== Actors ===
- Dinesh Deva
- Raman Gupta
- Supriya Kumari
- Jiy Mansooria
- Aman Rathore
- Vikram Rawani
- Sushil Sanwariya
- Pinki Singh

=== Lyricists ===
- Binay Tewary

== See also ==
- Cinema of Jharkhand
- Khortha Songs Lyricist - Binay Tewary.
- Nagpuri Songs
