= Dadagiri (game show) =

Television series

- Country of origin: India
- No. of seasons: 4

Production
- Running time: 1 hour
- Production company: UTV Television

Original release
- Network: Bindass
- Release: 2008 – 2011

Dadagiri is an Indian reality show that premiered on Bindass in 2008.

== History ==
In its first season, called Dadagiri: Beat the Bullies, contestants were selected every week and would compete for a prize money of Rs. 50,000. It was hosted by Akash Beri and had 4 "bullies": Vishal as "The Beast", Shraman Jain as "The Mindstein", Esha Bhaskar as "The Goddess" and Quaiser Jamal as Juicy The Chef. Contestants were required to complete physical and mental challenges, as well as endure abuse by the show's "bullies". According to a former contestant, the show was about 70% scripted and 30% improvised.

The second season premiered in 2009 and featured 12 contenders competing for a prize of Rs. 1,000,000. It had 2 bullies; Vishal returned as "The Beast" for the second season, and Sonnalli Seygall replaced Esha as "The Goddess".

The third season premiered in 2010, D3 Commando Force: Dadagiri Against Terrorism, and it also had cash prize.

The fourth and final season premiered in 2011, titled Dadagiri: The Revenge of the Sexes, and it featured two groups divided by gender. The male team was led by Vishal as "The Beast", and the female team by Shaurya Chauhan as "The Goddess".

== Assault incident ==
In one episode in 2008, "Esha, the Goddess" (Esha Bhaskar) slapped a contestant named Ravi Bhatia. He immediately slapped her back. The incident resulted in the male host (Akash Beri) and some crew members physically assaulting Bhatia while he repeatedly asked "How can she slap?". The video also went viral on the Internet. Bhatia subsequently sent a legal notice to the producers and asked for a public apology.
