= Looteri Dulhan =

- Created by: Ajit Anjum; Zaigham Imam
- Written by: Raakesh Paswan, Rahil Qazi; Brij Mohan Pandey
- Directed by: Prasad Gavandi
- Country of origin: India
- Original language: Hindi
- No. of episodes: 80

Production
- Producer: Anuradha Prasad
- Camera setup: Multi-camera
- Running time: 24 minutes
- Production company: BAG Films

Original release
- Network: Imagine TV
- Release: 28 March – 11 August 2011

Looteri Dulhan (transl. The plunder bride) is a Hindi television serial. That premiered on ImagineTV on 28 March 2011 and concluded on 11 August 2011. The show is inspired by real happenings of groom duping incidents based on Rajasthan and Haryana.

== Story ==
Looteri Dulhen is the story of Billo, a girl adopted by a Haryanvi family, who position themselves as sari traders from Uttar Pradesh. Their real business is to con 70-plus men who want to marry young woman and then flee with their valuables.

The show is loosely based on true incidents. Billo from UP, along with her family runs a business of robbing people by falsely marrying them and then fleeing with valuables soon after the wedding. The family otherwise owns a saree shop and their neighbours think that is how they make a living. Billo has been raised and trained by this family only for the con business. Billo was separated from her parents when she was very young, owing to severe flooding in their village. Each time that Billo marries a new ‘target’, she hopes she will somehow, amongst the guests and families, find her real family again.

At another such wedding, Billo meets her real father, and he happens to do her kanyadan. Billo decides that since her real father has given her away in marriage, this is a sacred relation for her. She will not cheat this man; this is the one that she will settle down with. She tells her husband Abhinav her true identity but, this time, the game is on her. Abhinav is already married, with a terminally sick wife, for whose treatment he now requires Billo to keep working as Looteri Dulhan.

They loot a new victim and flee with Suman to another city for her treatment, because the police was after them. This was something Suman wasn't aware of because she gets more ill; they did all that in an emergency. Suman couldn't survive. When she had some days left, she said that her last wish would be that she could return home to her in-laws.

Abhinav belonged to a rich family with a grandfather, grandmother, his father, his mother, his uncle, uncle's wife, his younger uncle and his wife, his two younger sisters and younger brother. But his father didn't accept Summan as his daughter-in-law. Because of that, he suspected that her father who was their cleaner was a thief which wasn't true.

Because of the family, Suman came home at the last moment she was alive. She got ill there and they went to her room. The last thing she said to Abhinav was that he would promise her to accept Billo as her wife after she died. Everyone in the family thought that Billo was Suman's sister.

After a time Abhinav's brother came back home after being out of the house for a while. He fell in love with Billo and so did Abhinav.

== Cast ==
| Actor | Role |
|---|---|
| Krishna Gokani / Supriya Kumari | Billo Singh / Looteri Dulhan |
| Mrunal Jain | Abhinav |
| Bharti Khandare | Sukhi Singh |
| Yajuvendra Singh | Angrez Singh |
| Smita Singh | Dehli Singh |
| Sitaram Panchal | Ramcharitar Singh |
| Vishal O Sharma | Diamond Singh |
| Shalini Chandran | Suman |

== Launched ==
The series, with a budget of about ₹1.5 crores, from its launch had a low viewership. Due to the less viewership causing losses, it went on a revamp in June 2011 with exit of the entire cast except the leads Supriya Kumari and Mrunal Jain and addition with a new cast of 17 members with cost efficient actors. However this also did not work for them and the series was cancelled in August 2011.

Billo was initially played by Krishna Gokani who was later replaced by Supriya Kumari in May 2011.
