= Chhorii 2 =

2025 Indian horror film by Vishal Furia

- Official release poster
- Directed by: Vishal Furia
- Written by: Vishal Furia; Ajit Jagtap
- Produced by: Bhushan Kumar; Krishan Kumar; Vikram Malhotra; Jack Davis
- Starring: Nushrratt Bharuccha; Soha Ali Khan; Gashmeer Mahajani
- Cinematography: Anshul Chobey
- Edited by: Abhishek Ojha
- Production companies: T-Series Films; Abundantia Entertainment; Pshych Film; Tamarisk Lane
- Distributed by: Amazon Prime Video
- Release date: 11 April 2025
- Running time: 134 minutes
- Country: India
- Language: Hindi

Chhorii 2 (transl. Girl 2) is a 2025 Indian Hindi-language horror film directed by Vishal Furia and produced by Bhushan Kumar, Krishan Kumar, Vikram Malhotra and Jack Davis. A sequel to Chhorii (2021), the film features Nushrratt Bharuccha in the lead role, alongside Soha Ali Khan, Gashmeer Mahajani and Saurabh Goyal. The film was premiered on Amazon Prime Video on 11 April 2025.

== Plot ==
The story picks up seven years after the events of the first film. Sakshi lives with her now seven-year-old daughter Ishani and Inspector Samar.

Ishani suffers from a rare condition that makes sunlight lethal to her — a protection by design to shield her from dark forces. Ishani is suddenly kidnapped by sinister villagers linked to her mother's ex-husband, Rajbir’s village cult. Sakshi and Inspector Samar return to the haunted sugarcane fields and the cursed village to save her daughter and confront supernatural threats.

They uncover the cult led by a shape-shifting high-priestess, Daasi Maa, and patriarchal elders engaged in child marriage and sacrificial rituals for immortality. Sakshi discovers eerie underground labyrinths where young brides are imprisoned and exploited. Amidst the scenario, she discovers Rani, who gets killed and dragged away by the still-alive Rajbir. The latter whips Sakshi unconscious and leaves her in the spiraling staircase of a well.

When Rajbir returns to drag away Sakshi's body, assuming her to be dead, he is killed by Sakshi, who is possessed by the spirits of Rani and all the murdered women. After this, Sakshi goes to the well to rescue Ishani while Samar fends off the rest of the cult. In the following chaos, Sakshi evokes a change in Daasi Maa's mindset for the better and manages to rescue Ishani, but ends up battling a half-human, cave-dwelling monster that sustains itself by preying on young girls (the creature for which all the sacrificial rituals were done). The reformed Daasi Maa also helps Sakshi by distracting the monster with her shape-shifted form.

Ishani is sent to safety under Daasi Maa’s care, but Sakshi is pulled back into the well by the monster using chains and remains trapped underground, gearing up for what appears to be another showdown (potentially leading to another sequel).

== Cast ==
- Nushrratt Bharuccha as Sakshi
- Soha Ali Khan as Daasi Maa
- Gashmeer Mahajani as Inspector Samar
- Rajesh Jais as Kajla
- Kuldeep Sareen as Taau
- Saurabh Goyal as Rajbir
- Pallavi Ajay as Rani Maa
- Hardika Sharma as Ishani
- Mukul Shrivastava as Pradhaan Ji
- Aarifa Siddiqui as Shaleen

== Production ==
The principal photography started on 30 November 2022. The film was wrapped up on 8 February 2023.

== Release ==
The film was premiered on Amazon Prime Video on 11 April 2025.

== Reception ==
Rahul Desai of The Hollywood Reporter India observed that "Despite its mood-lullaby vibe, Chhorii 2 resembles a curated museum exhibit of go-girl tropes. It’s all too familiar. And if Vishal Furia’s horror film were a person, it’d be a gender studies student on a gap year." Sukanya Verma of rediff.com rated 1.5/5 stars and said that "Chhorii 2 frustrates way more than it frightens". Dhaval Roy of The Times of India gave 3.5 stars out of 5 and said that "A socially charged horror tale packed with unnerving visuals and strong performances makes this a gripping watch from start to end." Sana Farzeen of India Today rated 2.5/5 stars and she observed that "The film struggles to deliver the intended chills, leading to a lacklustre experience."

Vinamra Mathur of Firstpost gave 2.5 stars and said "The intent is right and the theme is correct. The visuals are effective even if the execution falters". Udita Jhunjhunwala of Scroll.in commented that "The film’s themes include blind faith and fierce misogyny. After a great deal of blood, tears and screams, the emotional and disturbing core of Chhorii 2 is somewhat outdone by its focus on motifs, message and technique."

Devesh Sharma of Filmfare gave 2.5 stars out of 5 and commeneted that "Chorii 2 is an atmospheric horror film that strikes a blow against patriarchy." Shubham Kulkarni of OTT Play rated the film 2.5/5 stars and said, "Chhorii 2 is much better than a lot of massive star vehicles set on monstrous budgets." A critic from Bollywood Hungama gave 2 stars out of 5 and said that "CHHORII 2 rests on fine performances and a strong message but suffers due to a weak script, underwhelming climax and tacky VFX". Soumyabrata Gupta Times Now observed that "The Film lacks in using tropes of the genre to its fullest, becoming preachy rather than a terrifying watch."
