= Chhorii =

2021 Indian film by Vishal Furia

- Official release poster
- Directed by: Vishal Furia
- Written by: Vishal Furia; Vishal Kapoor
- Based on: Lapachhapi by Vishal Furia
- Produced by: Bhushan Kumar; Krishan Kumar; Vikram Malhotra; Jack Davis; Shikhaa Sharma; Shiv Chanana
- Starring: Nushrratt Bharuccha
- Cinematography: Anshul Chobey
- Edited by: Unnikrishnan P. P.
- Music by: Ketan Sodha
- Production companies: Abundantia Entertainment; Crypt TV; T-Series; Pshych Film
- Distributed by: Amazon Prime Video
- Release date: 26 November 2021
- Running time: 129 minutes
- Country: India
- Language: Hindi

Chhorii (transl. Girl/Lady/Woman) is a 2021 Indian Hindi-language horror film directed by Vishal Furia and produced by Bhushan Kumar, Krishan Kumar, Vikram Malhotra, Jack Davis, Shikhaa Sharma and Shiv Chanana. A remake of the Marathi-language film Lapachhapi (2017), the film features Nushrratt Bharuccha in the lead role, alongside Mita Vashisht, Rajesh Jais and Saurabh Goyal. The film premiered on Amazon Prime Video on 26 November 2021.

== Plot ==
In the opening scene, a pregnant woman is chased in a sugarcane field and forced to cut her own womb. The scene cuts to the cityscape, where a pregnant woman, Sakshi, works in an NGO and lives with her husband, Hemant. They both abscond to their driver's village to hide for some days after Hemant is beaten and threatened by some people for not returning a loan he had borrowed for a business plan.

They reach the village through a sugarcane field and meet the driver's wife Devi, a very orthodox woman. Hemant leaves to find a solution to their financial problems. Sakshi gradually finds a bond with Devi. She meets Rani, Rajbir's (Devi's eldest son) wife, the one who was chased in the first scene. Devi explains that Rani lost her child before the birth and in order to save her, her womb was cut.

Sakshi is teased by three children and grows curious about them. Devi warns her to stay away from them but Sakshi does not listen. Devi, being frustrated that Sakshi is not listening, threatens her. Things sour between her and Sakshi after this. A few days later, Hemant returns and Sakshi asks him to take her somewhere else in a fit of panic. That night, as they are leaving, the couple is attacked by Devi and a ritual is performed on Sakshi by Devi and her husband. Devi takes her back to her room and ties her to the bed.

Devi tells her that she must stay there alone for the next three days in order to get rid of Sunaini, Devi's sister-in-law and a ghost, who once was pregnant. She killed Devi's three little boys, her own husband, and then herself by cutting her womb when she was pregnant. Sunaini cursed Devi's family, ensuring they cannot continue their lineage. Devi tells Sakshi that all the visions she will see in the next three days will be illusions. Sakshi tries to escape the house but in vain.

It is revealed that Sunaini was being asked by her in-laws to kill her fetus because of it being a female child. When she refused and tried to escape, she accidentally killed her own husband. Devi's family, thinking Sunaini killed her husband, burned her alive. In the process, she gave birth to her baby but her baby was thrown in the well to fulfill a ritual that guarantees a good harvest. Sunaini, in her burned state, jumps into the well to save her daughter. Devi's three boys, who loved Sunaini, jumped in after her to save them, resulting in all of them dying and becoming ghosts.

Sakshi experiences the ordeal Sunaini went through in a series of harrowing experiences. In the final moments, before being made to self-harm her baby by Sunaini, she makes an oath to tell everyone of the ordeal that Sunaini went through if the ghost lets her go instead of repeating the same torment on the new wives. Sakshi survives the three days and in the morning when Devi, the driver and Hemant come, she refuses to leave without revealing the story.

Hemant is revealed to be Rajbir, who killed his previous two wives because he was afraid they would tell people about the murders in the village. He spared Rani because she swore to stay silent. As Rajbir goes to attack Sakshi from behind, Rani kills him, Devi, and Kajla using a cleaver. Sakshi walks away from the village house, through the sugarcane field in the direction given by the three ghost children. She is joined by Rani.

== Cast ==
- Nushrratt Bharuccha as Sakshi
- Mita Vashisht as Bhanno Devi, Kajla's wife
- Pallavi Ajay as Rani, Rajbir's third wife
- Yaaneea Bharadwaj as Sunaini
- Rajesh Jais as Kajla
- Saurabh Goyal as Rajbir/Hemant
- Gracy Goswami as a Small girl

== Production ==
The principal photography began on 25 November 2020 in Madhya Pradesh. The film was wrapped up in December 2020.

== Reception ==
On the review aggregator website Rotten Tomatoes, 22% of 9 critics' reviews are positive, with an average rating of 5.4/10.

It generally received positive reviews from critics and mixed reviews from audiences, praising the performance of Nusrat Bharucha but criticising the horror scenes. However, Rohan Naahar of The Indian Express wrote that though "the film is a surprisingly well-made horror picture that actually respects the genre, but loses its way so tragically in its final moments" and turn it "into a message movie." Concluding the review, Rohan asks a question to the director, "Does Furia [(director)] think that potential baby-killers are watching his film? Does he expect Chhorii to change their mind about killing babies?"

== Sequel ==
In December 2021, the sequel Chhorii 2 was officially confirmed by makers of film. It featured Nushrratt Bharuccha and Soha Ali Khan in leading roles.

The sequel was released on Amazon Prime Video on 11 April 2025.
