= Anudamini =

Indian Television Series

- Genre: Drama
- Starring: Sachin Shroff; Alihassan Turabi; Supriya Kumari; Mitali Nag; Deepali Sahay; Neetu Singh; Shyam Mashalkar; Raujesh Kumar Jain
- Opening theme: Ripul Sharma; Momita Das
- Country of origin: India
- No. of seasons: 1
- No. of episodes: 260

Production
- Executive producers: Priti Jain; Milap Chand Jain; Raujesh Kumar Jain
- Production locations: Vasai-Virar; Bombay
- Editor: Lalit Tiwari
- Running time: 22 minutes

Original release
- Network: DD National
- Release: 31 March 2014 – 16 December 2015

Anudamini is an Indian Hindi drama which premiered on DD National on 31 March 2014 to 16 December 2015 under the banner of Krish Movies. It starred Sachin Shroff, Alihassan Turabi, Supriya Kumari, Deepali Sahay, Neetu Singh, Shyam Mashalkar, and Raujesh Kumar Jain.

== Plot ==
Anudamini is a story of a small town girl, who has never stepped out of her village. She is placed in a sophisticated background after her marriage to the character Dev, and struggles to cope with the different lifestyle and acceptance from her husband and family.

== Broadcast ==
Anudamini daily soap is first aired between 2014–15 and the opera re-aired at DD1 in 2016. The Serial is Again re-telecasting at DD National in 2021–22.

== Cast ==
- Sachin Shroff as Dev
- Alihassan Turabi as Manoj
- Supriya Kumari as Anudamini
- Mitali Nag
- Neha Bam
- Rohit Mehta as Rahul
- Neetu Singh
- Deepali Sahay
- Neena Singh
- Mahesh Mashalkar
- Sudeepti Parmar
- Shilpi Shukla
- Ekta Methai
- Abhayshankar Jha
- Shyam Mashalkar
- Sagar Saini
- Raujesh Kumar Jain
