= Nushrratt Bharuccha =

Indian actress (born 1985)

- Bharuccha in 2024
- Born: Nushrat Bharucha; 17 May 1985 (age 41); Bombay, Maharashtra, India
- Education: Jai Hind College
- Occupation: Actress
- Years active: 2002–present

Nushrratt Bharuccha (born Nushrat Bharucha; 17 May 1985) is an Indian actress and model who mainly works in Hindi films. After working in television, she made her film debut with Jai Santoshi Maa (2006). She gained recognition for her roles in Love Sex Aur Dhokha (2010) and Pyaar Ka Punchnama (2011). Bharuccha's career progressed with starring roles in the comedies Pyaar Ka Punchnama 2 (2015), Sonu Ke Titu Ki Sweety (2018), and Dream Girl (2019). She has since starred in Chhorii (2021), Janhit Mein Jaari (2022) and Ram Setu (2022).

== Early life and education ==
Bharuccha was born on 17 May 1985 in a Dawoodi Bohra family of Mumbai. She is the only child of Tanvir Bharucha, a businessman and Tasneem Bharucha, a housewife. She graduated from Jai Hind College in Mumbai.

== Career ==
=== Early career and struggles (2002–2014) ===
Bharuccha made her acting debut with a minor role in the 2002 television series Kittie Party. She got her first Hindi film with Jai Santoshi Maa (2006) and did the music video "Zindagi Kahin Gum Hai" by Zubeen Garg in 2007. She had a cameo in Kal Kissne Dekha (2009) and did the Telugu film Taj Mahal (2010). Her final television role occurred in Seven as Drishika Kashyap.

Bharuccha had her first leading role in Hindi films with Dibakar Banerjee and Ekta Kapoor's anthology Love Sex Aur Dhokha (2010), that did moderately well. She next starred opposite Kartik Aaryan in Luv Ranjan's directorials Pyaar Ka Punchnama (2011) and Akaash Vani (2013), both of which were superhits. Her next movie was Darr @ the Mall (2014) with Jimmy Sheirgill.

=== Breakthrough and further career (2015–present) ===
Bharuccha rose to success by appearing with Aaryan for the third time in Ranjan's Pyaar Ka Punchnama 2 (2015). The film turned out to be her first commercial hit, earning over ₹88 crore worldwide. However, her other release Meeruthiya Gangsters (2015) and the Tamil film Valeba Raja (2016) underperformed.

In 2018, she received wider attention after portraying a grey shaded character opposite Aaryan and Sunny Singh in Luv Ranjan and Bhushan Kumar's rom-com Sonu Ke Titu Ki Sweety. It proved to be a surprise blockbuster at the box-office, earning ₹150 crores worldwide. She retained this widespread success with Kapoor, Bhushan Kumar and Raaj Shaandilyaa's ₹200 crores-grossing comedy Dream Girl (2019), where she played Ayushmann Khurrana's love interest. Both Sonu Ke Titu Ki Sweety and Dream Girl entered the 100 Crore Club in India and rank among her highest grossing releases.

Bharuccha performed an item number in 2019, "Peeyo Datt Ke" alongside Sidharth Malhotra in the Milap Zaveri and Bhushan Kumar's romantic thriller Marjaavaan which was sung by Yo Yo Honey Singh. She starred in two music videos, Atif Aslam's "Baarishein" and Guru Randhawa's "Ishq Tera".

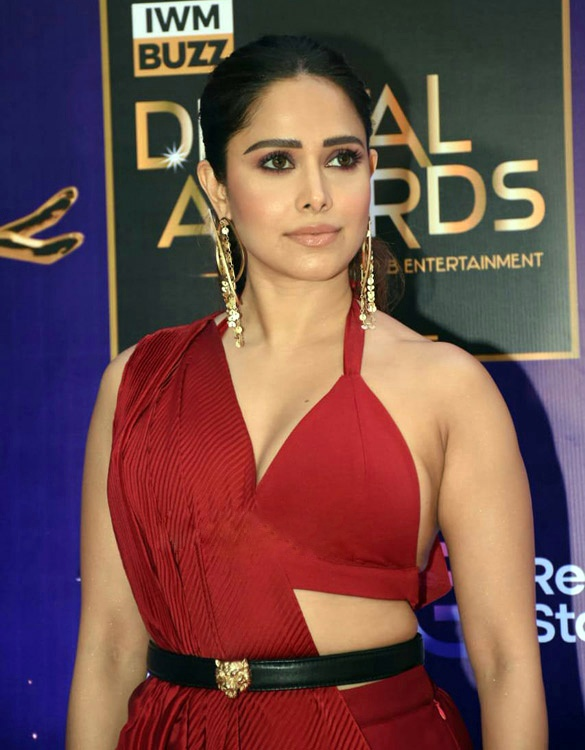
Bharuccha at an event

Due to the COVID-19 pandemic in India that led long closure of theatres, Bharuccha's next sports film Chhalaang (2020) directed by Hansal Mehta and produced by Bhushan Kumar and Ajay Devgn, was directly released on OTT platform Amazon Prime Video. She played Rajkummar Rao's ladylove in the film that met with mixed reviews.

In 2021, she headlined Yo Yo Honey Singh's music video "Saiyaan Ji" and featured in two OTT films. Firstly she was seen in Karan Johar and Raj Mehta's Netflix anthology film Ajeeb Daastaans and then in Vishal Furia and Bhushan Kumar's Amazon Prime horror film Chhorii, both of which earned her critical praise for her acting. Chhorii marked her first film as a solo female-centric character.

The following year, Bharuccha appeared firstly in the love triangle Hurdang (2022) alongside Sunny Kaushal and Vijay Varma. A huge box office failure, it was directed by Nikhil Nagesh Tiwari and produced by Bhushan Kumar. That year, she also earned critical praise for appearing in the female-centric social comedy Janhit Mein Jaari.

She featured in the historical drama Ram Setu with Akshay Kumar and Jacqueline Fernandez, which released on Diwali 2022. This will be followed by Chhorii 2, a sequel to Chhorii. She also teamed up with Akshay Kumar, Diana Penty and Emraan Hashmi in Johar and Mehta's 2023 comedy Selfiee.

In 2023, Bharuccha had a cameo in the Ranbir Kapoor, Shraddha Kapoor starrer Tu Jhoothi Main Makkar.

== Personal life ==
In June 2020, Bharuccha changed the spelling of her name to Nushrratt Bharuccha, due to numerological reasons.

Bharuccha and her mother speak vociferously against the custom of female genital mutilation, the latter had undergone it as a child.

In 2023, during her visit to Tel Aviv, Israel to promote her film at a film festival, Nushrat got stuck in the Hamas-led attack on Israel. She was rescued and brought home to India by the help of Indian embassy.

== Media image ==
Bharuccha in 2019

Bharuccha has a keen interest in writing, mainly poems. Bharuccha has appeared on Times 50 Most Desirable Woman list various times. She ranked 29th in 2018, 34th in 2019 and 34th in 2020. She is a celebrity endorser for brands and products including Cadbury and BoroPlus.

== Filmography ==
=== Film ===
- All films are in Hindi unless otherwise noted.

Key
†	Denotes films that have not yet been released

List of film credits
Year	Title	Role	Notes	Ref.
2006	Jai Santoshi Maa	Mahima		
2009	Kal Kissne Dekha	Ria		
2010	Taj Mahal	Shruthi	Telugu film; credited as Shruthi	
2010	Love Sex Aur Dhokha	Shruti Dhaiya		
2011	Pyaar Ka Punchnama	Neha		
2013	Akaash Vani	Vani Mehra		
2014	Darr @ the Mall	Ahana Manchanda		
2015	Meeruthiya Gangsters	Mansi		
2015	Pyaar Ka Punchnama 2	Ruchika "Chiku" Khanna		
2016	Valeba Raja	Sweety	Tamil film	
2018	Sonu Ke Titu Ki Sweety	Sweety Sharma		
2019	Dream Girl	Mahi Rajput		
2019	Marjaavaan	Herself	Special appearance in song "Peeyu Datt Ke"	
2020	Jai Mummy Di	Young Laali Khanna	Cameo appearance	
2020	Chhalaang	Neelima Mehra		
2021	Ajeeb Daastaans	Meenal	Segment: "Khilauna"	
2021	Chhorii	Sakshi Devi		
2022	Hurdang	Jhulan Yadav		
2022	Janhit Mein Jaari	Manokamna "Mannu" Tripathi		
2022	Ram Setu	Gayatri		
2023	Selfiee	Minty Aggarwal		
2023	Tu Jhoothi Main Makkaar	Anya	Cameo appearance	
2023	Chatrapathi	Sapna		
2023	Akelli	Jyoti		
2025	Chhorii 2	Sakshi Devi		
2025	Ufff Yeh Siyapaa	Pushpa		
2026	Gajab Raat	Rosie	Special appearance	
2027	Untitled Remo D'Souza film †	TBA	Filming	

=== Television ===
List of television credits
Year	Title	Role	Network	Ref.
2002	Kittie Party	Chiku	Zee TV	
2010	Seven	Drishika Kashyap	Sony Entertainment Television	

=== Music video appearances ===
List of music video appearances credits
Year	Title	Singer(s)	Ref.
2007	"Zindagi Kahin Gum Hai"	Zubeen Garg	
2019	"Baarishein"	Atif Aslam	
2019	"Ishq Tera"	Guru Randhawa	
2021	"Saiyaan Ji"	Yo Yo Honey Singh, Neha Kakkar	
2023	"Savage"	Yo Yo Honey Singh	
2024	"Rooh"	Yo Yo Honey Singh	

== Accolades ==
List of awards and nominations received by Bharuccha
Year	Award	Category	Film	Result	Ref.
2011	Screen Awards	Best Ensemble Cast	Love Sex Aur Dhokha	Nominated	
2012	Zee Cine Awards	Best Actor in a Supporting Role – Female	Pyaar Ka Punchnama	Nominated	
2015	BIG Star Entertainment Awards	Most Entertaining Actor in a Comedy Role – Female	Pyaar Ka Punchnama 2	Won	
2015	BIG Star Entertainment Awards	Most Entertaining Ensemble Cast	Pyaar Ka Punchnama 2	Won	
2016	Screen Awards	Best Ensemble Cast	Pyaar Ka Punchnama 2	Nominated	
2021	Busan International Film Festival	Best Actress	Ajeeb Daastaans	Nominated	
2022	Lokmat Stylish Awards	Most Stylish Performer of the Year	—N/a	Won	
2022	Iconic Gold Awards	Best Actress- Critics	Chhorii	Won	
2022	Filmfare OTT Awards	Best Actor in a Web Original Film – Female	Chhorii	Nominated	
2023	Bollywood Hungama Style Icons	Most Stylish Haute Stepper	—N/a	Nominated	
2023	Lokmat Stylish Awards	Most Stylish Trendsetter – Female	—N/a	Won	
2024	Bollywood Hungama Style Icons	Most Stylish Magnetic Star of the Year	—N/a	Won	
