= Akelli =

2023 Indian drama film

- Theatrical release poster
- Directed by: Pranay Meshram
- Written by: Pranay Meshram; Gunjan Saxena; Ayush Tiwari
- Produced by: Aparna Padgaonkar; Shashant Shah; Vicky Sidana; Ninad Vaidya; Nitin Vaidya
- Starring: Nushrratt Bharuccha; Mannat Duggal; Amir Boutrous; Rajesh Jais; Tsahi Halevi
- Cinematography: Pushkar Singh
- Edited by: Sumeet Kotian
- Music by: Score: Rohit Kulkarni; Songs: Hitesh Sonik; Gurshabad; Aman Pant; Mehul Vyas
- Production company: Dashami Studioz
- Distributed by: PVR Inox Pictures
- Release date: 25 August 2023
- Running time: 127 minutes
- Country: India
- Language: Hindi

Akelli (lit. 'Alone') is a 2023 Indian Hindi-language action-thriller film directed by Pranay Meshram in his directorial debut. It stars Nushrratt Bharuccha in the lead role. The film is about an ordinary Indian girl trapped in a combat zone who must battle for her life. Akelli was released on 25 August 2023 to negative reviews from critics.

== Plot ==
In 2014, Jyoti, an Indian woman lands in Mosul to take up a new job as supervisor in a garments factory. She is received at the airport by Raafiq, a Pakistani national, also an employee at the factory. On the way from the airport, she witnesses a little girl who has been strapped to a bomb and is killed when the bomb disposal team is unable to disable the bomb.

Earlier, she had gotten fired from her job at an airport in India after an altercation with an unruly passenger. Because of this, she is unable to get a new job. Her family's financial problems force her to take a job in Iraq even though she knows that it’s not safe there and anything can happen. She lies to her family that she has taken a job in much safer Muscat.

At the factory, she gets friendly to Raafiq and develops romantic feelings for him.

A few weeks later, ISIS forces attack Mosul and also capture the factory. They kill anyone trying to escape or who is not cooperating with them. They segregate the factory staff into 3 groups, men, women and a few who are to be spared. Raafiq is among those spared. The men are taken to an open field and shot dead, while the women are taken to a facility and sold as sex slaves.

Jyoti is bought by one of the ISIS fighters, who tries to rape her. However, she pushes him, and he falls, bangs his head on a hard corner and dies. The other ISIS fighters discover this and are astonished. She is given off to Assad, a senior commander, who lives in a palatial house. He is impressed by her and forces her to marry and live with him. She is imprisoned in a small room, where she meets two young girls, Mahira and Afra who are also sex slaves of Assad.

The next day, she is taken to Assad's bedroom, where he rapes her. The next morning when she wakes up, she sees Assad is still sleeping, and finds a pair of handcuffs and a pistol on a table. Just as she handcuffs Assad, he wakes up and there is a scuffle. In the scuffle, she shoots Assad on the shoulder. Hearing the gunshot, his guards come to his room to enquire, when the door opens and Jyoti comes out with Assad as hostage with the gun pointed to his head. Using Assad as hostage, she gets the two girls also released and locks the guards and Assad's wives into a room.

They find a car and drive away from the place. While escaping, Assad jumps out of the car.

They reach an Iraqi army checkpoint, where the local commander takes them to his home where his wife gives them food. However, when one of the girls overhears them planning to sell them back to ISIS for money, they escape from there with ISIS in hot pursuit. But they are saved in the nick of time when they reach a Peshmerga outpost where a sniper kills the ISIS soldiers and they are taken to a UN refugee camp.

In the refugee camp, the two girls meet their uncle who is a Peshmerga commander, and he promises to help her get back to India. He arranges for her to get a UN identity card and papers and to be driven to Mosul Airport.

However, before she can board the waiting aircraft, Assad also arrives at Mosul airport looking for her. At the airport, she escapes being detected, and hides on the rooftop. At the rooftop, Raafiq, purportedly now a member of ISIS, turns up and tells her he will help her get to the aircraft by shutting off the airport lights, whereby she can get to it under the cover of darkness. He also gives her a letter to send to his family in Pakistan, after she gets back to India.

Once it gets dark, Raafiq turns off the lights and Jyoti escapes to the aircraft. However, Raafiq is discovered to be the one who turned off the lights, and is killed by Assad. ISIS fighters come into the plane looking for Jyoti, but are unable to find her. She is shown to be hiding in the undercarriage area of the plane.

The plane is cleared for takeoff and lands in Baghdad, where an exhausted and passed out Jyoti falls out of the plane as it is landing. She is discovered and taken to a hospital where she makes a recovery. Thereafter, she returns back to India with help from the Indian Embassy.

Back in India, she is happily reunited with her mother and niece Mahi. She tearfully posts Raafiq's letter to his parents in Pakistan.

== Cast ==
- Nushrratt Bharuccha as Jyoti
- Nishant Dahiya as Raafiq who was Jyoti's colleague at the garment factory
- Rajesh Jais as Ranjit Chawla
- Tsahi Halevi as Assad, ISIS commander of a higher level than Wahab
- Amir Boutrous as Wahab, ISIS commander
- Piloo Vidyarthi as Beeji
- Mannat Duggal as Mahi, Jyoti's niece
- Shivani Sopori as Noor Bano
- Ward Musharafieh as Mahira
- Munisa Halmanova as Afra
- Merve Ozel as Sabreena
- Nand Chopra as Devendra Suri
- Kassem Mansoor as Iraqi cop Nawab
- Jessica Haddad as Momina, wife of Nawab
- Leyla as The girl with the bomb vest
- Imam Mazhar as Factory worker Haafiz
- Nodira Murtazoyeva as Habiba, Assad’s wife

== Production and release ==
The film started in 2022 and was wrapped in April 2023. Shooting of the film was predominantly in Iraq.

The film was released in theatres on 25 August 2023 and on JioCinema OTT platform on 3 May 2024.

== Music ==
Akelli

Soundtrack album by Hitesh Sonik, Gurshabad, Aman Pant and Mehul Vyas
- Released: 24 August 2023
- Recorded: 2022
- Genre: Feature film soundtrack
- Length: 13:40
- Language: Hindi
- Label: Zee Music Company

Official audio
- Akelli - Full Album on YouTube

The music of the film is composed by Hitesh Sonik, Gurshabad, Aman Pant and Mehul Vyas while lyrics written by Manoj Tapadia, Gurshabad Raj Shekhar and Mukund Bhalerao.

Track listing
No.	Title	Lyrics	Music	Singer(s)	Length
1.	"Tu Akelli Hi Kafi Hai"	Manoj Tapadia	Aman Pant	Daler Mehndi, Piyush Kapoor, Himanshu Choudhary, Kinjal Chaterjee, Devashri Manohar	3:35
2.	"O Mahey"	Gurshabad	Gurshabad	Gurshabad, Chayanika Gargg	2:41
3.	"Umeedon Ki Titliyan"	Raj Shekhar	Hitesh Sonik	Sunidhi Chauhan	2:11
4.	"Mera Apana Aasma"	Mukund Bhalerao	Mehul Vyas	Romy	4:13
Total length:					13:40

== Reception ==
On the review aggregator website Rotten Tomatoes, 0% of 8 critics' reviews are positive, with an average rating of 3.7/10.

Shubhra Gupta of The Indian Express rated the film 1/5 and wrote "This Nushrratt Bharuccha-starrer makes for a tiring watch, where all you do is wonder how we are meant to swallow the going-ons on screen."

Saibal Chatterjee of NDTV gave the film 1.5/5 and wrote "This tale of a woman cornered and fighting for dear life had the potential to be a thrilling, edge-of-the-seat ripsnorter. It falls way, way short. The lacklustre Akelli is a film best left alone."

Lachmi Deb Roy of Firstpost gave it a rating of 2.5 out of 5, and wrote "Akelli could have been a good story on human resilience, but what I felt was the film failed because of the inconsistent script and because of the under-experience of debutant filmmaker Pranay Meshram. The intention of the film was good where the director has made an attempt to highlight the dangers of traveling to dangerous zones like Iraq in search of better jobs and plump salaries."

Mayur Sanap of Rediff.com rated 1.5/5 stars and observed "What could have been an immensely compelling survival drama is reduced to the pretty-girl-in-peril thriller."
