= Raman Gupta =

Indian actor, dancer, and singer (born 1977)

- Born: Bundu, Ranchi, Jharkhand, India
- Occupations: Actor; Dancer; Singer

Raman Gupta (born 28 June 1977) is an Indian actor, dancer and singer. He works in Nagpuri albums, Nagpuri films and Khortha film. He also acted in many Hindi films. He is known for the Nagpuri film Sun Sajna, Deva Rikshawala and Gangwa. He was awarded best regional actor award in Jharkhand International Film Festival Awards in 2018 and Best Evergreen Actor in Jhollywood Award Show in 2022.

== Career ==
He acted in the Nagpuri film Sun Sajna with actress Kanchan Roy as a lead. The film was directed by Rajiv Sinha released in 2005. The film was made in the budget of 5 lakh and shoot in hilly location of Ranchi and Ratu fort. The music composer of film was Jaykant. The singer of the film were Monika Mundu, Pawan Roy, Pankaj and Ritu. In 2019, he acted in film Deva Rikshawala which was based on Rikshaw puller. In 2019, he acted in Khortha film Maati with Varsha Rittu Lakra as lead which won best Khortha film award in Jharkhand International Film Festival Awards in 2019. The film was produced by Manish Gupta. His upcoming movie is Gangwa, directed by Aditya Kumar. The film also feature Bunty Singh and well known actor of Bollywood Ranjeet, Hemant Birje. He also acted in the film M.S. Dhoni: The Untold Story.

== Filmography ==
Key
| † | Denotes films that have not yet been released |

| Year | Film | Role | Language | Notes |
|---|---|---|---|---|
| 2005 | Sun Sajna | | Nagpuri | |
| 2014 | Koyelaanchal | | Hindi | |
| 2016 | M.S. Dhoni: The Untold Story | | Hindi | |
| 2019 | Maati | | Khortha | Film won best Khortha film award in JIFFA 2019 |
| 2019 | One Day: Justice Delivered | special appearance | Hindi | |
| 2019 | Deva Rikshawala | | Nagpuri | |
| 2020 | †Gangwa | | Nagpuri | |
| 2023 | Joram | Constable Solanki | Hindi | |
| 2024 | Panchayat Kar Khela | | Nagpuri | |

== Awards ==
| Ceremony | Category | Year | Result | Reference |
|---|---|---|---|---|
| Jharkhand International Film Festival Awards | Best regional actor | 2018 | Won | |
| Jhollywood Award Show | Best Evergreen Actor | 2022 | Won | |
