= Hamaari Beti Raaj Karegi =

- Written by: Paushali Ganguli
- Directed by: Bhagwan Yadav
- Starring: See below
- Country of origin: India
- Original language: Hindi
- No. of seasons: 1
- No. of episodes: 115

Production
- Producer: Benaifer Kohli
- Production location: Mumbai
- Camera setup: Multi-camera
- Running time: Approx. 24 minutes
- Production company: Edit II Productions

Original release
- Network: Sahara One
- Release: 20 December 2010 – 3 June 2011

Hamaari Beti Raaj Karegi (transl. Our daughter will prevail) is an Indian television drama series that aired on Sahara One channel. The series is premiered on 20 December 2010 . The series stars Saira Banu.

== Plot ==
Binaifer Kohli and Sanjay Kohli, Producers, Edit II Productions, "Hamaari Beti Raaj Karegi portrays the dream of every father of getting his daughter married in the best of family, hoping that she will live a queen’s life and rule the household."

== Cast ==
- Akanksha Juneja as Anjali Shukla
- Ravi Bhatia as Nirbhay
- Shashank Sharma as Vikram
- Debashish Nah as Uma Shankar Shukla
- Kavita Magare as JYOTI
- Shekhar Sharma as Shashidhar Chaturvedi
- Shagufta Ali as Taiji
