= Bairi Piya (TV series) =

- Genre: Drama
- Created by: Ekta Kapoor
- Written by: Anil Nagpal; Amit Jha; Shirish Latkar; Vandana Tewari; Anshuman Sinha
- Directed by: Fahad Kashmiri; Randeep Shantaram Mahadik; Deepak Chavan; Santosh Kolhe; Suraj Rao
- Starring: See below
- Opening theme: "Bairi Piya" by Pamela Jain
- Country of origin: India
- Original language: Hindi
- No. of seasons: 1
- No. of episodes: 252

Production
- Executive producer: Ekta Kapoor
- Producers: Ekta Kapoor; Shoba Kapoor
- Production location: Mumbai
- Camera setup: Multi-camera
- Running time: Approx. 25 minutes
- Production company: Balaji Telefilms

Original release
- Network: Colors TV
- Release: 21 September 2009 – 3 September 2010

Bairi Piya is an Indian television drama series. It was produced by Ekta Kapoor under the production of Balaji Telefilms. Series was aired on Colors TV from 21 September 2009 to 3 September 2010.

== Plot ==
Amoli is a 20-year-old girl and the eldest child of her parents. Amoli's friend, Kaumudi, is abducted by goons working for Thakur Digvijay, a rich landlord, because her father, Tukaram, is unable to pay the debts he owes.

At the end of the show, Thakur promises Amoli that he will return to her. He is sentenced to five-year imprisonment. Upon his release from prison, Thakur returns home, and they finally consummate their marriage and start a happy life.

== Cast ==
=== Main cast ===
- Sharad Kelkar as Thakur Digvijay Singh:
  - Bhadoria/Ranveer, Amoli's husband, Badi Malkin's son, Suren, Chandana and Puneet's uncle
- Supriya Kumari as Amoli:
  - Digvijay Singh Thakur's wife, Harshvardhan and Sunanda Devi's eldest daughter, Sanchita and Ankita's eldest sister, Tukaram & Sudan's adopted-daughter

=== Recurring cast ===
- Shresth Kumar as Radhe, Amoli's ex-husband
- Shreya Bugade as Chandana, Radhe's second wife
- Sumana Das as Kajri
- Deepak Sandhu as Deepesh Bhadoria, Thakur's nephew
- Asima Bhatt as Badi Malkin, Thakur's mother
- Kadambari Shantshree Suman Kamble, Amoli's adoptive mother, Dhani's mother
- Kailash as Tukaram Kamble, Amoli's adoptive father, Dhani's father
- Kumar Hegde as Dhani Kamble, Amoli's adoptive sister, Suman and Tukaram's daughter
- Vaishnavi Mahant as Sunanda Devi Pundir, Amoli's biological mother, Devi's wife, Sanchita and Ankita's mother
- Manoj Bhaskar as Harshvardhan “Devi” Pundir, Amoli's biological father, Sunanda's husband, Sanchita and Ankita's father
- Neetha Shetty as Surbhi Pundir (Badiya Bahu), Amoli's cousin in law, Nirbhay's wife
- Sandhya Soni as Ankita Pundir, Amoli's biological sister, Sanchita's sister, Sunanda and Devi's youngest daughter
- Neha Gehlot as Sanchita Pundir, Amoli's biological sister, Ankita's sister, Sunanda and Devi's second daughter
- Pallavi Subhash Chandran as Rashmi Pundir (Chiggy Bahu), Amoli's cousin in law, Prithvi's wife
- Pawan Chopra as Viraat Pundir, Amoli's biological uncle, Devi's elder brother, Nirbhay and Prithvi's father
- Kanika Chaddar as Rohini Pundir, Amoli's biological aunt, Viraat's wife, Nirbhay and Prithvi's mother
- Priyamvada Kant as Kaumudi, Amoli's best friend
- Rithvik Dhanjani as Prithvi Pundir, Amoli's biological cousin brother, Devi's nephew, Rashmi's husband
- Aham Sharma Nirbhay Pundir, Amoli's biological cousin brother, Devi's nephew, Surbhi's husband
- Shubhi Mehta as Urmila Bhadoria, Thakur's ex-wife
- Srishty Rode as Saumya
- Mahhi Vij as Nakusha
