= Shraman Jain =

Indian actor

Sharman Jain
- Born: Sharman Jain; 1 July; Uttar Pradesh
- Other name: Srman Jain
- Occupation: Actor
- Known for: Adaalat, Saas Bina Sasural, Chhanchhan, Dadagiri and Comedy Classes.

Shraman Jain (also known as Srman Jain) is an Indian actor who works mainly in Indian television. Jain is known for his roles in Adaalat, Saas Bina Sasural, Chhanchhan, Dadagiri and Comedy Classes.

Before acting in Adaalat he was known for portraying "Pracheen" in Saas Bina Sasural. He played Shraman, assistant of main protagonist Ronit Roy in Adaalat.

Jain made his film debut with Desi Boyz. He also played the role of Mohit in the Star Plus popular show Mere Angne Mein. He was last seen in the SAB TV show Trideviyaan.

Besides acting in films he also produced a Marathi film titled Janiva. This film is the debut film of Vaibhavi Shandilya.
