= Mukund Nayak =

Jharkhand Cultural Artist

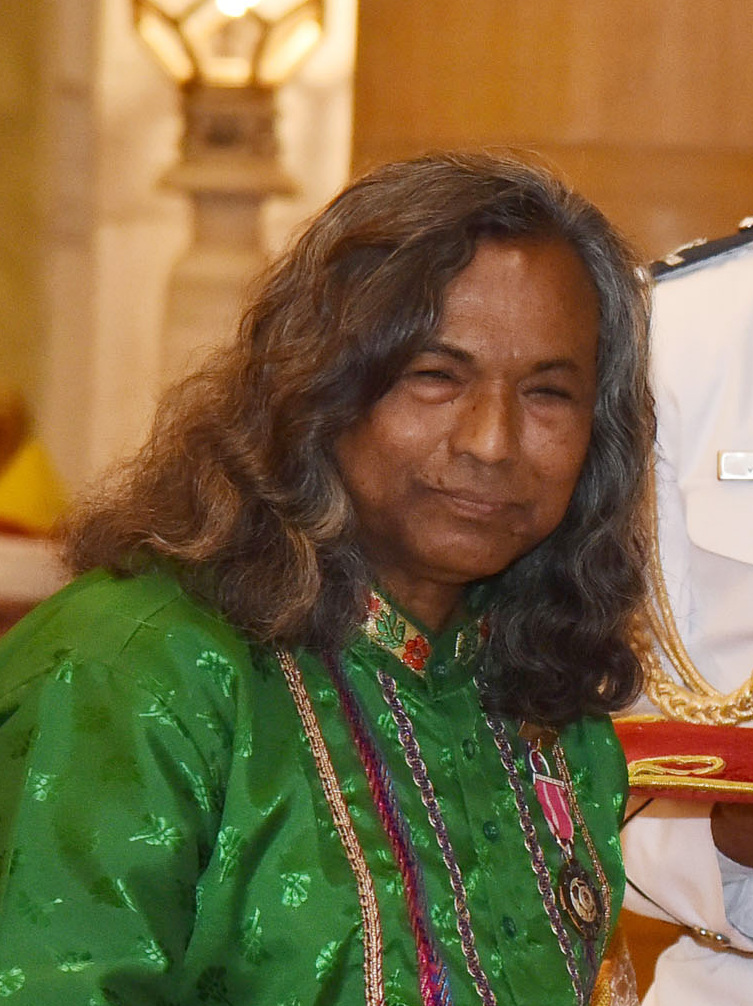
- Mukund Nayak at a Civil Investiture Ceremony at Rashtrapati Bhavan at New Delhi in 2017
- Born: Mukund Nayak; 15 October 1949 (age 76); Bokba, Simdega, Bihar (now Jharkhand), India
- Education: B.Sc, Jamshedpur
- Occupations: Industrial Chemist (till 1979); Folk Singer; Songwriter; Dancer; Actor
- Years active: 1974–present
- Known for: Nagpuri folk music
- Spouse: Smt. Dropadi Devi.
- Children: Nandlal Nayak; Vidya Nayak; Praduman Nayak; Chandrakanta Nayak; Suryakanta Nayak
- Awards: Sangeet Natak Akademi Award (2019); Padma Shri (2017)

Mukund Nayak (born 15 October 1949), is an Indian artist. He is a folk singer, songwriter and dancer. Nayak is an exponent of Nagpuri folk dance Jhumar. He is recipient of the Padma Shri and Sangeet Natak Akademi Award.

== Early life and family ==
He was born in Bokba village of Simdega district, Bihar (now Jharkhand) in 1949. He belongs to a family of a Ghasi community, who are traditionally musicians. He completed B.SC from Jamshedpur. He married Dropadi Devi. He has five children including Nandlal, Praduman and twin Chandrakanta and Suryakanta.

== Career ==
With aim to preserve traditional folk arts, Mukund Nayak had started performing songs in public places with other cultural activist like Bharat Nayak, Bhavya Nayak, Praful Kumar Rai, Lal Ranvijay Nath Shahdeo and Kshitij Kumar. In 1974, he joined Akashvani as performer. His first performance at larger audience was at Jaganathpur Mela in Ranchi. In 1979, he left the job of an industrial chemist and joined the Song and Drama Division of Bihar Government. It gave him the opportunities to work in radio and television. With government patronage, he traveled abroad to perform in Hong Kong, Taiwan, Philippines and United States. In 1980, when regional and tribal language department formed in Ranchi University, he became associated with the University. In 1981, he came in contact with Dr Carol Merry Baby researcher on Karam music of South Bihar and got a chance to work with her. In 1988, his troupe performed at the third "Hong Kong International Dance festival" of The Hong Kong Institute for the Promotion of Chinese Culture. In 1985, he established an organisation "Kunjban" to promote Nagpuri culture. Kunjban promotes Nagpuri culture, especially Nagpuri Jhumar. He also worked in many nagpuri films. His first nagpuri film was Sona Kar Nagpur produced and directed by Dhananjay Nath Tiwary produced in 1992 and released in 1994.

=== Filmography ===
Year	Film	Actor	Music composer	Singer	Language	Notes
1992	Sona Kar Nagpur	Yes			Nagpuri	Sona Kar Nagpur is first nagpuri film.
2009	Baha		Yes		Nagpuri	
2019	Phulmania			Yes	Nagpuri	
2022	Karma Dharma	Yes			Nagpuri	

== Awards and honors ==
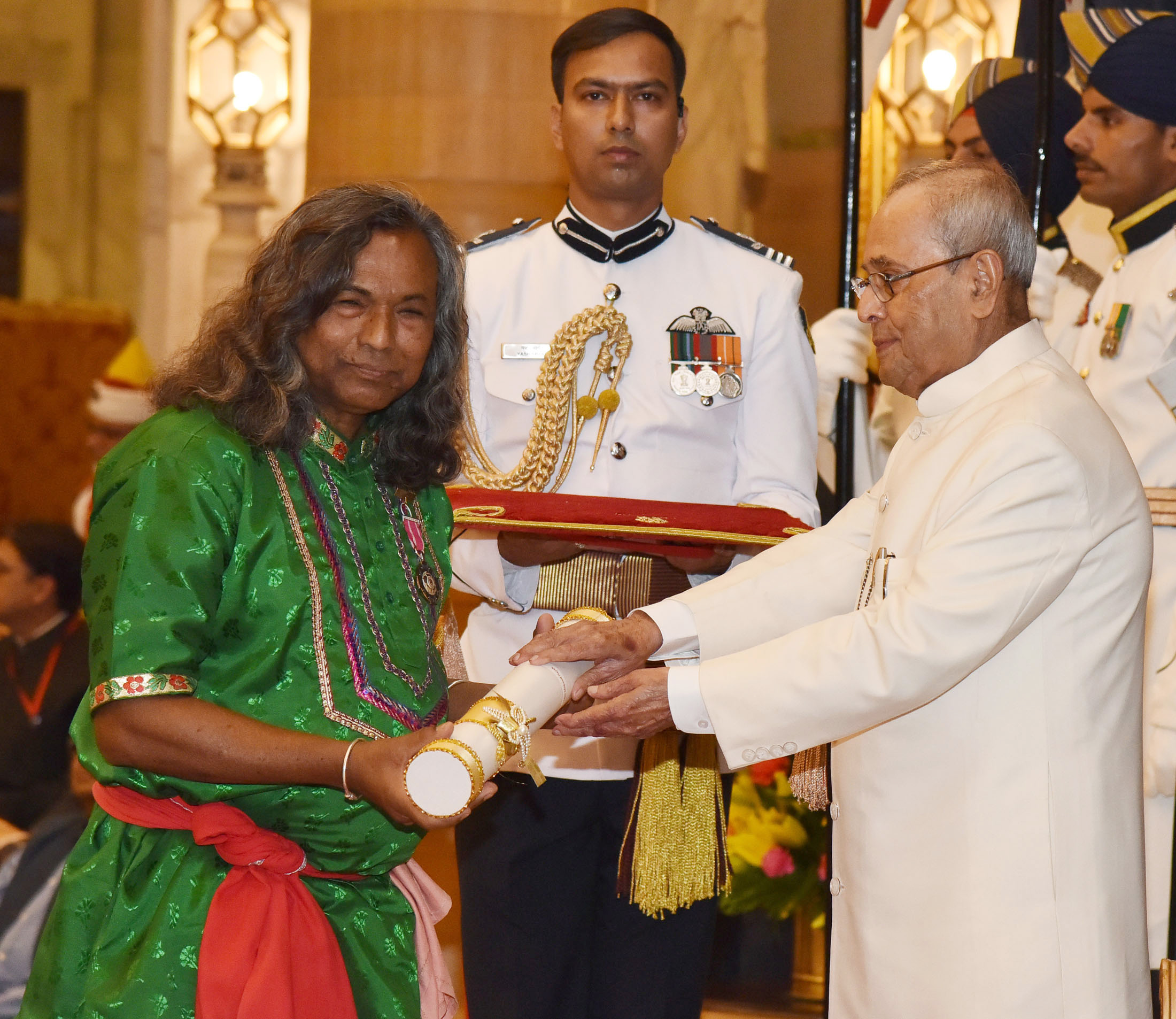
Nayak receiving the Padma Shri Award at a Civil Investiture Ceremony, at Rashtrapati Bhavan, in New Delhi on 30 March 2017

- Sangeet Natak Akademi Award, 2019
- Padma Shri, 2017
- Sanskritik Samman (2017) by Kala Sanskriti Vibhag.
- Jharkhand Gaurav Sammaan by Prabhat Khabar.
- Jharkhand Ratna Award by Lok Kala Samiti & Dainik Jagran.
