= Dhumkkudiya =

- Directed by: Nandlal Nayak
- Written by: Nandlal Nayak
- Screenplay by: Nandlal Nayak
- Story by: Nandlal Nayak
- Produced by: Sumit Agarwal
- Starring: Rinkal Kacchap; Pradhuman Nayak; Rajesh Jais; Subrat Dutta; Nikhhil R khera; Vinod Anand; Varsha Rittu Lakra; Gita Guha
- Cinematography: Rupesh Kumar
- Edited by: Prakash Jha
- Music by: Nandlal Nayak
- Release date: 2019
- Country: India
- Languages: Nagpuri; Hindi; English

Dhumkkudiya (2019) is an Indian, Nagpuri film directed by Nandlal Nayak and produced by Dr Sumit Agarwal (NCKS EXPLORATIONS). The film features Rinkal Kacchap and Pradhuman Nayak in prominent roles. The story of the film is based on true incidents of human trafficking. The film won Outstanding Achievement Award in Culcutta International Cult Film Festival (2019). It has won Best Editing and Best Content awards in Japan Film Festival. It has won Best Feature Film in Hollywood Blood Horror Festival, Los Angeles in 2019 and Best Producer, Best Acting Ensemble, Best Costume, Best Makeup & Hairstyling, Best Trailer and Best Poster Awards in 2020. It has won Best Lead Actress Award in American Golden Picture International Film Festival and in New York Movie Awards 2020 both in USA. The film has won more than 60 awards around the world. The film will be screened in Cannes Film Festival of France on 12 July 2021.

== Plot ==
The film is based on a true incident of human trafficking of a 14 years old tribal girl from Jharkhand who died.

== Cast ==
- Rinkal Kachhap as Rishu
- Pradhuman Nayak as Budhwa
- Rajesh Jais as Minister
- Nikhhil R Khera as Minister's son in law
- Subrat Dutta as Kamal
- Vinod Anand as Mill Owner
- Varsha Rittu Lakra as Minister's daughter
- Gita Guha as Rishu's Mother
- Chandra Shekhar Dutta as Agent

== Awards ==
- 2019: Outstanding Achievement Award, Culcutta International Cult Film Festival, Kolkata, India
- 2019: Best Editing and Best Content Awards, Japan Film Festival, Tokyo, Japan
- 2019: Best Director, Eurasia International Film Festival, Berlin & Moscow
- 2019: Best Feature Film, Hollywood Blood Horror Festival, Los Angeles, USA
- 2019: Finalist, Florence Film Awards, Florence, Italy
- 2019: Finalist, Care Awards, Cairo, WV, USA
- 2019: Screened In Unheard India Section, Kolkata International Film Festival, Kolkata, India
- 2019: Closing Film, Azamgarh International Film Festival, Azamgarh, India
- 2019: Official Selection Screening in The 25th Kolkata International Film Festival, Kolkata, India
- 2019: Best Script Award, Chhatrapati Shivaji International Film Festival, Pune, India
- 2020: Critic's Choice Award, Best Hindi Film, Rajasthan International Film Festival 2020, Jaipur, India
- 2020: Critic's Choice Award, Best Actor, Rajasthan International Film Festival 2020, Jaipur, India
- 2020: Best Lead Actress, American Golden Picture International Film Festival, USA
- 2020: Best Producer Award, Hollywood Blood Horror Festival, USA
- 2020: Best Acting Ensemble, Hollywood Blood Horror Festival, USA
- 2020: Best Costume Design, Hollywood Blood Horror Festival, USA
- 2020: Best Makeup & Hairstyling, Hollywood Blood Horror Festival, USA
- 2020: Best Trailer, Hollywood Blood Horror Festival, USA
- 2020: Best Poster, Hollywood Blood Horror Festival, USA
- 2020: Best Actress, New York Movie Awards, USA
- 2020: Best Screenwriter, American Golden Picture International Film Festival, USA
- 2020: Best Trailer, American Golden Picture International Film Festival, USA
- 2020: Best Editor, American Golden Picture International Film Festival, USA
- 2020: Best Sound Design, American Golden Picture International Film Festival, USA
- 2020: Best Director, American Golden Picture International Film Festival, USA
- 2020: Best Director, Mabig Film Festival, Augsburg, Germany
- 2020: Best Drama Film, Mabig Film Festival, Augsburg, Germany
- 2020: Best Script, Hollywood International Golden Age, New York, USA
- 2020: Official Selection, IAFF - International Art Film Festival, London, UK
- 2020: Official Selection, Asian Film Festival, Los Angeles, Hollywood, USA
- 2020: Best Script, Aasha International Film Festival, Nashik, India
- 2020: Semi Finalist, Cannes International Independent Film Festival, Cannes, France
- 2020: Semi Finalist, South Asian Film Festival On Montreal, Canada, USA
- 2020: Official Selection, Great Lakes International Film Festival, Erie, PA, USA
- 2020: Best Feature Drama, Indie-Dance Film Festival, New York, USA
- 2020: Finalist, Wales International Film Festival, Wales, UK
- 2020: Best Feature Film Drama, Sicily Independent Film Awards, Sicily, Italy
- 2020: Official Selection, First Coast Film Festival, Jacksonville, Florida, USA
- 2020: Finalist, Vesuvius International Film Festival, Italy
- 2020: Official Selection, Love Wins Film Festival, New York, USA
- 2020: Finalist, Freedom Festival International, Columbia, USA
- 2020: Best Feature Film, Madras Independent Film Festival, Chennai, India
- 2020: Best Actress, Madras Independent Film Festival, Chennai, India
- 2020: Runner Up Best First Filmmaker Award, The 2nd Annual NEWSFEST International Film Festival & Awards, Las Vegas, USA
- 2020: Official Selection, The NewsFest (True Stories), USA
- 2020: Official Selection, Caorle Film Festival, Caorle, Italy
- 2020: Silver Winner, Queen Palm International Film Festival, Palm Spring, California, USA
- 2020: Finalist, Anatolia International Film Festival, Istanbul, Turkey
- 2020: Finalist, Kosice International Film Festival, Kosice, Russia
- 2020: Official Selection, Mumbai International Cult Film Festival, Mumbai, India
- 2020: Official Selection, Golden Jury International Film Festival, Mumbai, India
- 2020: Official Selection, Sincine Film Awards, Mumbai, India
- 2021: Semi Finalist, 5th Jaipur Film World 2021, Jaipur, India
