= Ilaka Kishoreganj =

2018 film by J. Nutan Punkaj

Ilaka KisKishoreganj
- Directed by: J. Nutan Punkaj
- Written by: J. Nutan Punkaj
- Produced by: Rupesh Kumar Agarwal; R.K. Das; Leelawati; Nutan Shankar
- Starring: Rohit R.K.; Shikha Swaroop; Rupesh Kumar Charan Pahari; Deepak Lohar; Anand Kumar; Leelawati
- Cinematography: Sahil J. Ansari
- Edited by: Jai P. Mshra
- Music by: J. Nutan Punkaj
- Production companies: Ma Devdi Motion Pictures; Tej World Entertainment; Daksh World Entertainment; Anukriti Entertainment Private Ltd.
- Release date: 2 November 2018
- Running time: 133 minute
- Country: India
- Language: Hindi

Ilaka KisKishoreganj is a Hindi film directed by the husband-wife duo of J Nutan-Pankaj. The film has been produced under the banners of Ma Devdi Motion Pictures, Tej World Entertainment, Daksh World Entertainment and Anukriti Entertainment Private Ltd. The cast includes Rohit RK, Shikha Swarup, Rupesh Kumar Charan Pahari, Deepak Lohar, Lilawati, and Anand Kumar.

== Cast ==
- Rohit RK
- Shikha Swaroop
- Rupesh Kumar Charan Pahari
- Deepak Lohar
- Lilawati
- Anand Kumar
- Monika Mundu
