= Ajab Singh Ki Gajab Kahani =

- Directed by: Rishi Prakash Mishra
- Written by: Rishi Prakash Mishra
- Produced by: Binod Kumar
- Starring: Ajay Kumar Singh; Yashpal Sharma; Govind Namdev; Rajesh Jais; Madhu Roy; Manoj Mishra; Master Atharva Raj; Mukesh Ahuja; Vikas Giri; Amit Koushik; Archana Prasad; Hansa Tiwari; Lucinda Nicholas; Mukesh Kumar; Shiv Prasad
- Cinematography: Saravanan Elavarasu
- Edited by: Anil Ray
- Music by: Ved Sharma; Tanmay Pahwa
- Production companies: Shree Triveni Films International; An India E-Commerce Ltd.
- Release date: 21 April 2017
- Running time: 115 minutes
- Country: India
- Language: Hindi

Ajab Singh Ki Gajab Kahani is a Hindi film directed Rishi Prakash Mishra, produced by Binod Kumar and featured Ajay Kumar Singh, Yashpal Sharma, Vikas Giri, Manoj Mishra, Govind Namdev, Amit Koushik and Rajesh Jais. The film is a biopic of a disabled Indian Revenue Service officer Ajay Singh.

== Plot ==
The film is a biopic of a disabled Indian Revenue Service officer, Ajay Singh.

== Cast ==
- Ajay Kumar Singh as Ajab SIngh
- Govind Namdev as Bacha singh
- Yashpal Sharma
- Rajesh Jais
- Amit Koushik as Police officer -pappu yadav
- Manoj Mishra
- Vikas Giri
- Madhu Roy
- Master Atharva Raj
- Mukesh Ahuja
- Archana Prasad
- Hansa Tiwari
- Lucinda Nicholas
- Mukesh Kumar
- Shiv Prasad
