= Ravi Bhatia =

Indian television actor

- Occupation: Actor
- Years active: 2008 – present

Ravi Bhatia is an Indian television actor. He is known for his portrayal of Salim in Zee TV's Jodha Akbar.

== Career ==
He was a contestant on the show Dadagiri (specifically Beat the Bullies).

In 2014, he was selected out of 12 contestants for the role of Prince Salim in Ekta Kapoor's popular historical show Jodha Akbar. In 2015, he started appearing on various Indonesian television shows.

== Filmography ==
=== Films ===
Year	Title	Role	Notes	Ref.
2007	Go	Veer Bhaji Singh		
2013	2 Little Indians	Papa		
2019	Phulmania	Jay	Hindi-Nagpuri bilingual	
2022	The Conversion	Dev		
2023	Future Fight	Ravi	Hindi	Short Movie

=== Television ===
Year	Title	Role	Notes	Ref.
2008	Dharamveer	Kranti		
2008	Kahaani Hamaaray Mahaabhaarat Ki	Vichitravirya		
2008	Dadagiri: Beat the Bullies	Contestant	Season 1	
2009–2010	Raja Ki Aayegi Baraat	Balma		
2010–2011	Hamaari Beti Raaj Karegi	Nirbhay		
2011–2012	Veer Shivaji	Jiva Mahala		
2012–2013	Sukanya Hamari Betiyan	Viraj Seth		
2012	CID	Aman	Episode: "Khooni Drugs"	
2013	CID	Dheeraj	Episode: "Mohabbat Ka Shikaar"	
2013–2014	Do Dil Bandhe Ek Dori Se	Vivek Seharia		
2014	Pyaar Tune Kya Kiya	Unknown	Episodic role	
2014	Yeh Shaadi Hai Yaa Sauda	Unknown		
2015	Jodha Akbar	Salim		
2015	Cinta Di Langit Taj Mahal 2	Ravi	Indonesian television	
2016	Roro Jonggrang	Raja Warsa/ Raja Kegelapan	Indonesian television	
2016–2017	Gara-Gara Duyung	Andara	Indonesian television	
2017	I-KTP	Ravi	Indonesian television	
2017	Sambalado	Unknown	Indonesian television	
2019	Laal Ishq	Bakul	Episode: "Shaitani Shalaka"	
2020	Ishq Subhan Allah	Sartaj Ahmed		
2024	Pyar Ka Pehla Adhyaya: Shiv Shakti	Naag		

=== Web series ===
- Shukla – The Tiger (as Shukla)
- Halala (as Rahil)
- Margaon – The Closed File (Upcoming)
- Char ka Punchnama (Upcoming)
- Hastinapur (Upcoming)

=== Music videos ===
Year	Title	Singer(s)	Ref.
2022	Yaad Karoge	Sandeep Jaiswal	
