= Nukkad Naatak =

- Directed by: Tanmaya Shekhar
- Written by: Tanmaya Shekhar
- Produced by: Medha Khanna; Tanmaya Shekhar; Molshri
- Starring: Molshri; Shivang Rajpal; Danish Husain; Nirmala Hajra
- Cinematography: Ihjaz Aziz
- Edited by: Sruthy Sukumaran
- Music by: Parthhesh Menon
- Production company: Kayaantaran Studios
- Release dates: 5 December 2024 (Kolkata); 27 February 2026 (India)
- Running time: 105 minutes
- Country: India
- Language: Hindi

Nukkad Naatak (transl. Street Play) is a 2024 Indian Hindi-language social drama film written and directed by Tanmaya Shekhar. The film stars Molshri, Shivang Rajpal, Danish Husain and Nirmala Hajra. Produced by Medha Khanna, Tanmaya Shekhar and Molshri, the film was released theatrically on 27 February 2026.

== Plot ==
After being caught robbing their college canteen, best friends Shivang and Molshri are expelled from college. They are given a final opportunity to return by enrolling five children from a nearby slum into school. What begins as an obligation gradually transforms into a journey of responsibility, self-discovery and social change.

== Cast ==
- Molshri
- Shivang Rajpal
- Danish Husain
- Nirmala Hajra
- Lalit Saw
- Monita Sinha
- Mayank Shandilya

== Production ==
The film was written and directed by Tanmaya Shekhar in his feature directorial debut. It was produced independently by Medha Khanna, Tanmaya Shekhar and Molshri. The filmmakers undertook a grassroots promotional campaign across multiple cities prior to the film's release.

== Release ==
Nukkad Naatak premiered at the Kolkata International Film Festival on 5 December 2024. It was released theatrically in India on 27 February 2026. The film began streaming on Netflix on 24 April 2026.
