= Mahuua =

Nagpuri film

- Directed by: Sanjay Verma; Avishek Anand
- Written by: Balal Ansari; Rajiv Ranjan Singh
- Produced by: Satyen Srivastav
- Starring: Stefy Patel; Prince Sondhi; Ali Khan; Manoj Verma; Shakti Singh; Punam Singh; Dinesh Deva; Kajal Singh; Raj Sinha; Ajay Ghosh; Shahensa gaur
- Cinematography: Sumit Sachdeva
- Music by: Upendra Pathak
- Production company: Shailja Movies
- Release date: 25 May 2018
- Running time: 156 min
- Country: India
- Language: Nagpuri

Mahuua is a Nagpuri film starring Stefy Patel and Prince Sondhi. It was directed by Sanjay Verma and produced by Satyen Srivastav.

== Plot ==
The film shows how women fight against social superstition and unsocial elements in order to enact societal change.

== Cast ==
- Stefy Patel
- Prince Sondhi
- Ali Khan
- Manoj Verma
- Shakti Singh
- Punam Singh
- Dinesh Deva
- Kajal Singh
- Raj Sinha
- Ajay Ghosh
- Shahensa Gaur

== Awards ==
Ceremony	Category	Year	Result	Reference
Jharkhand International Film Festival Awards	Best Nagpuri Film	2018	Won	
