= Sanjivan Lal =

Indian film director and writer (born 1965)

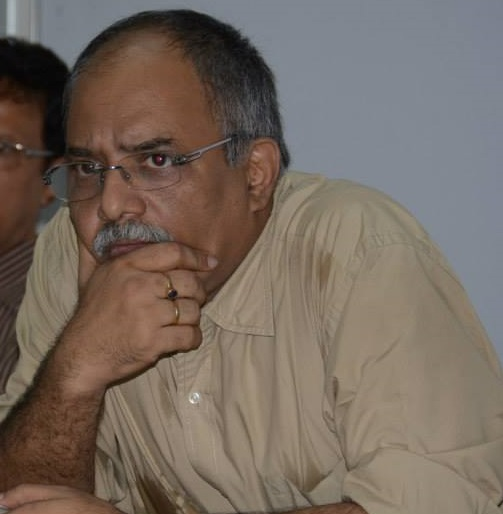
- Born: 18 June 1965; Jamshedpur, Jharkhand
- Occupations: Film director, writer
- Years active: 1993–present

Sanjivan Lal (born 18 June 1965) is an Indian film director and writer. He did his specialisation in Film Direction from Film and Television Institute of India at Pune. Before making feature films, he had made several documentaries on various topics for Government as well as for the Corporates. He has also made several one-off episodes for various channels like Zee and Star TV.

He was a jury member of non-feature section of Indian Panorama for IFFI, 2005 at Goa.

In 2011, he made his directorial debut with the film Bubble Gum which was a critically acclaimed film and was also appreciated all over. The film was among the 5 films you should've watched in 2011 by Rajeev Masand. The film was also listed among the best films of 2011 by Hindustan Times.

Sanjivan was also noticed and was among the best Debut Directors List of Yahoo! India.

== Early life ==
Sanjivan Lal was born in Jamshedpur. He had his early education at Loyola School, Jamshedpur and later at Sawan Public School, New Delhi.

Later he did his graduation from Kirori Mal College, University of Delhi, where he took part in Dramatic Society – The Players.

After graduation he pursued Chartered Accountancy in Delhi for 2 and a half years only to quit & join 6 months documentary workshop being conducted by CENDIT, New Delhi sponsored by The Indo-German Social Service Society, 1989.

At the end of the workshop he got through Film and Television Institute of India at Pune to specialise in Film Direction. He graduated from FTII in 1993 & shifted to Bombay.

== Career ==
Sanjivan Lal is an alumnus of the Film and Television Institute of India in Pune with specialization in Film Direction, 1993. His diploma film The Second Page about the killing of under trails in Police lock ups was screened as part of the Indian Panorama at the International Film Festival of India in Calcutta in 1994.

Starting his own production house, Lumiere Films, Sanjivan directed several one offs telecast on prime television channels like Star Plus's Star Bestsellers, Zee TV's Rishtey, Saturday Suspense and Sahara TV's Raaz and Mujrim Kaun? The episode 'Khazana' in the thriller series 'Mujrim Kaun?' won the prestigious RAPA award for excellence in Radio and Television advertising.

Sanjivan has dealt with a variety of non-fiction subjects as well. From a film on Chau mask making for the Government of Jharkhand, to a film on the Electronic Voting Machine for The Election Commission of India.

His documentary film "Is God Deaf?" about noise pollution in the name of religion was selected for the International Festival of Documentary and Reality Films at New Delhi and the International Film Festival of India, 2004, as part of the Indian Panorama beside host of other film festivals.

His first feature film in Hindi was Bubble Gum which was released on the 29 July 2011. The film was critically acclaimed and was among the best films of 2011. IMDb still rates this film at 7.3/10

In June 2017, Sanjivan established his film company called Eclectic Films.

He is currently in talks with various producers for his next film.

Meanwhile, he is also producing and directing a feature-length documentary film for the international market titled 1947: Brexit India. It looks at the international factors and the economics that dictated a hurried granting of independence to India in 1947. It has been scripted by Ms. Shama Zaidi, the writer of M.S. Sathyu's Garam Hawa and Satyajit Ray's Shatranj Ke Khilari And has Dr. Shashi Tharoor, William Darlymple, Dr. Ishtiaq Ahmed from Pakistan, Dr. Alister Hinds from West Indies, Professor Tom Tomlinson from London, Dr. David Omissi (University of Hull, Britain) and some more.

== Activities ==
Has attended several scriptwriting workshops by Anjum Rajab Ali, British Council and by Script Factory from UK.

Sanjivan attended Rotterdam Lab at Rotterdam, Netherlands, in 2007.

Did freelance journalism on cinema for Delhi-based newspapers: Hindustan Times, The Patriot and The Indian Express.

== 1947: Brexit India ==
Sanjivan directed a feature-length documentary titled - 1947: Brexit India, which sheds a light on British presence in India from 1609 till 1947. The documentary aims to focus on the factors behind India getting Independence apart from the National Movement led by the National leaders. The Documentary is Anchored and Narrated by Boman Irani and have speakers such as Shashi Tharoor - former diplomat, politician, writer and public intellectual; William Dalrymple - Scottish historian, art historian and curator, as well as a broadcaster, critic and photographer; M. Rajivlochan - Historian and Member of Department of History, Panjab University, Chandigarh; Commodore Chitrapu Uday Bhaskar - retired military officer who served in the Indian Navy; Ishtiaq Ahmed - Swedish political scientist and author of Pakistani descent; Allister Hinds - author of books such as Britain's Sterling Colonial Policy and Decolonization, 1939-1958; Professor Tom Tomlinson - Emeritus Professor, Department of History, School of History; Dr. David Omissi - Senior Lecturer in Modern History, University of Hull; Gurharpal Singh - political scientist.

The documentary is being presented and produced by Swarnjit Singh, a U.S. based doctor in association with Sanjivan Lal's production company - Eclectic Films. The principal photography of the documentary was completed on 25 March 2022 and is currently in post-production and expected to be ready by the end of May/beginning of June 2023. The documentary was shot in United Kingdom - London, Hull and Wales. In India, it was shot in New Delhi, Chandigarh, Mumbai, Plassey, Murshidabad and Buxar. The film has been shot by Jogendra Panda while the sound design is by Manas Ranjan Choudhury. The editor of this film is Prashant Naik and the associate director is Arjun Lal.

For research purposes, the team had support from [National Library of India|The National Library of India, Kolkata] and Asiatic Library, Mumbai. Apart from these institutions, numerous books and research papers were also referred by Mr.Swarnjit Singh and Ms. Shama Zaidi. Shama Zaidi is also the writer of the film. She is a writer of films like M.S.Sathyu's Garam Hawa, Satyajit Ray's Shatranj ke Khiladi & Shayam Benegal's Discovery of India. Regarding the archive footage the main sources were British Pathe, AP Archive, Doordarshan and Films Division, Mumbai. The photographs were sourced by various institutions and individuals across the world with a big help coming from Mr. Philip Thornton the founder of the group East India Company & Raj Research Group, 1600–1919 on Facebook.

== Filmography ==
=== Director ===
- Bubble Gum
- 1947: Brexit India

=== Writer ===
- Bubble Gum
- Chakkar [Under production] Co-writer-Ranjan Das.

== Fiction ==
- The Second Page
- Machaan- Produced by Gul Anand. Starring: Saeed Jaafry, Mohan Agashe, Amol Palekar, Peeenaz Masani, Jonny Lever, Rohini Hattangadi, Tinu Anand etc.
- Mujrim Kaun? with Nirmal Pandey
- Rishtey: Mujhe Mat Yaad Karna for Zee TV Produced by Kamlesh Pandey
- Rishtey: Shagun [Co-produced by Ashthavinayak Cinevision]
- Raaz: Shaatir with Nirmal Pandey
- Raaz: Blackmail With Nirmal Pandey
- Woh Kaun?: Sadma With Nirmal Pandey
- Star Bestsellers: The Penpal

== Documentary ==
- Chhau Mukhaute- A documentary on mask-making of Chhau dance for Government of Jharkhand
- “Is God Deaf?”- A documentary on a senior citizen fight against communalization of Noise Pollution. A true story Produced by Lumiere Films for PSBT Now also being proposed as a Hindi Feature Film.
- Vann Aur Jeevan- A documentary on the life of the forest guards and officers. Shot in the forest of Himachal Pradesh Produced by CENDIT, New Delhi
- When God Went To Sleep - for American TV. Produced by an environmentalist Dr. Rashmi Mayur
- The Painted Confession - A documentary on the Prisoner serving life term in Yerwada Jail for killing his Art College Dean. Each painting reflected his guilt / his repentance.
- Ek Boond Zindagi- Produced by Films Division
- The Electronic Voting Machine- Produced by Lumiere Films for Election Commission of India
- Rajgir Hot Springs [Produced by Lumiere Films for Zee Chakra]
- Madhubani Paintings [Produced by Lumiere Films for Zee Chakra]
- Manjusha Art [Produced by Lumiere Films for Zee Chakra]
- Alternative energy-Biogas [Produced by Lumiere Films for Zee Chakra]
- Alternative education-Creative learning [Produced by Lumiere Films for Zee Chakra]
- Alternative energy: Solar Cooker [Produced by Lumiere Films for Zee Chakra]
- Alternative treatment: Jaundice [Produced by Lumiere Films for Zee Chakra]
- 1947: Brexit India [Under Post Production - Produced under Eclectic Films 2023]

== Corporate films ==
- Election Campaign Films
- Infomercial – Miracle Mixer
- The Makaton Language for Makaton India and SPJ Sadhana School, Mumbai

== Awards and rewards ==
The episode Khazana in the thriller series Mujrim Kaun? won the prestigious RAPA award for excellence in Radio and Television advertising.

"Is God Deaf?" was selected for PSBT-Prasar Bharti-UNESCO'S International Festival of Documentary & Reality Films at New Delhi, 2004 and was also selected for 35th International Film Festival of India [IFFI 2004] at Goa as a part of the Indian Panorama.

His diploma film The Second Page about the killing of under trails in Police lock ups was selected for the Indian Panorama at the 25th International Film Festival of India, Calcutta 1994.
