= Koyelaanchal =

- Theatrical release poster
- Directed by: Ashu Trikha
- Written by: Sanjay Masoomm; Vishal Vijay Kumar
- Produced by: Ashu Trikha
- Starring: Vinod Khanna; Sunil Shetty; Vipinno; Roopali Krishnarao; Ravi Singh
- Cinematography: Karan B. Rawat
- Edited by: Umashankar Mishra
- Music by: Sunil Singh; Sushant-Shankar
- Release date: 9 May 2014
- Running time: 145 mins
- Country: India
- Language: Hindi

Koyelaanchal is a 2014 Indian Hindi-language crime thriller film film produced and directed by Ashu Trikha, starring Vinod Khanna, Suniel Shetty, Vipinno and Roopali Krishnarao.

== Plot ==
Koyelaanchal follows Saryu Bhan Singh, an ex-owner turned Mafioso of the region, who maintains control the area through brutality and violence.

Saryu Bhan Singh faces difficulties when District Collector Nisheeth Kumar takes charge of the region and starts investigating his activties. He attempts to scare Nisheeth into silence through hired thugs.

But the mission don't-kill-just-scare-him goes horribly wrong when Karua ends up injuring Nisheeth's wife and in the process of escape, ends up carrying Nisheeth's infant also, thus abducting the child.

== Cast ==
- Vinod Khanna as Saryu Bhan Singh aka Maalik
- Suniel Shetty as Nisheeth Kumar
- Vipinno as Karua
- Rupali Krishnarao as Roopmati
- Purva Parag
- Deepraj Rana
- Brij Gopaleee
- Kannan Arunachalam as Kannan Iyer (cop from Intelligence Bureau)
- Ravi Singh as Bhushan & Puran
- Biswanath Basu as Ghosh Babu
- Lata S Singh as Mrs. Ghosh
- Himayat Ali
- Chitragupta sinha as chacha
- Ranjit as Bhatija
- Master Manjeet Singh
- Raman Gupta

== Soundtrack ==
No.	Title	Singer(s)	Length
1.	"Ak-47"	Khesari Lal Yadav
2.	"Prem Badariya"	Santosh Pandit
3.	"Prem Badariya"	Naveen Kumar

== Critical reception ==
Koyelaanchal received mixed reviews from the critics. Taran Adarsh of Bollywood Hungama rated 3 stars mentioning it as an "absorbing and engaging" film. Film Critic Subhash K. Jha gave it 3 stars and said that Koyelaanchal has a plot that reads like pulp fiction but feels like a slice of ugly Indian history. Film Critic Joginder Tuteja has also given it 3 stars and termed it "Different And Unconventional".
