= Nasoor (2023 film) =

Nagpuri film

- Directed by: Rajiv Sinha
- Produced by: Rajiv Sinha
- Starring: Vivek Nayak; Shivani Gupta; Vivek Kumar Awasth; Prakash Pathak; Manoj Verma; Arti Mishra; Sukumar Mukherjee; Chitra Mukherjee
- Cinematography: Pankaj Goswami
- Edited by: Prahlad
- Music by: Srikant Indwar; Upendra Pathak
- Production company: Rajiv Films
- Release date: 23 June 2023
- Running time: 100 minutes
- Country: India
- Language: Nagpuri
- Budget: ₹50 lakh

Nasoor (2023) is an Indian, Nagpuri film produced and directed by Rajiv Sinha. The film features Vivek Nayak and Shivani Gupta in lead roles. The story of the film is based on the practice of witch hunting in a village of Jharkhand.

== Story ==
The story of the film is based on social issue and revenge. The film is a love story of Kishan and Rajo in a village of Jharkhand. It is based on witch hunting practice in the village.

== Cast ==
- Vivek Nayak as Kishan
- Shivani Gupta as Rajo
- Vivek Kumar Awasth as Tantric
- Prakash Pathak
- Manoj Verma
- Arti Mishra
- Sukumar Mukherjee
- Chitra Mukherjee

== Production ==
The film was produced and directed by Rajiv Sinha. The shooting of the film took place in the Rukka village, Rukka Dam, nearby forest and Morabadi in the city of Ranchi. The shooting was completed in six months.

== Sound Tracks ==
The music composers of the film are Srikant Indwar and Upendra Pathak. Vivek Nayak has given his voice in the songs.

== Release ==
The film did not get any distributor, so producer Rajiv Sinha directly released the film in the cinema halls. Due to the dominance of Bollywood films, the film faced difficulty getting screens and got released on a single screen. The film was released on 23 June 2023 at Carnival Cinema and Jodi high steel mall in Ranchi.

== Reception ==
The film got a positive response from audiences. The film ran for three weeks and became a hit. It was the first Nagpuri film which ran for three weeks in the cinema hall.
