= Pankaj Dubey =

Indian author and director (born 1978)

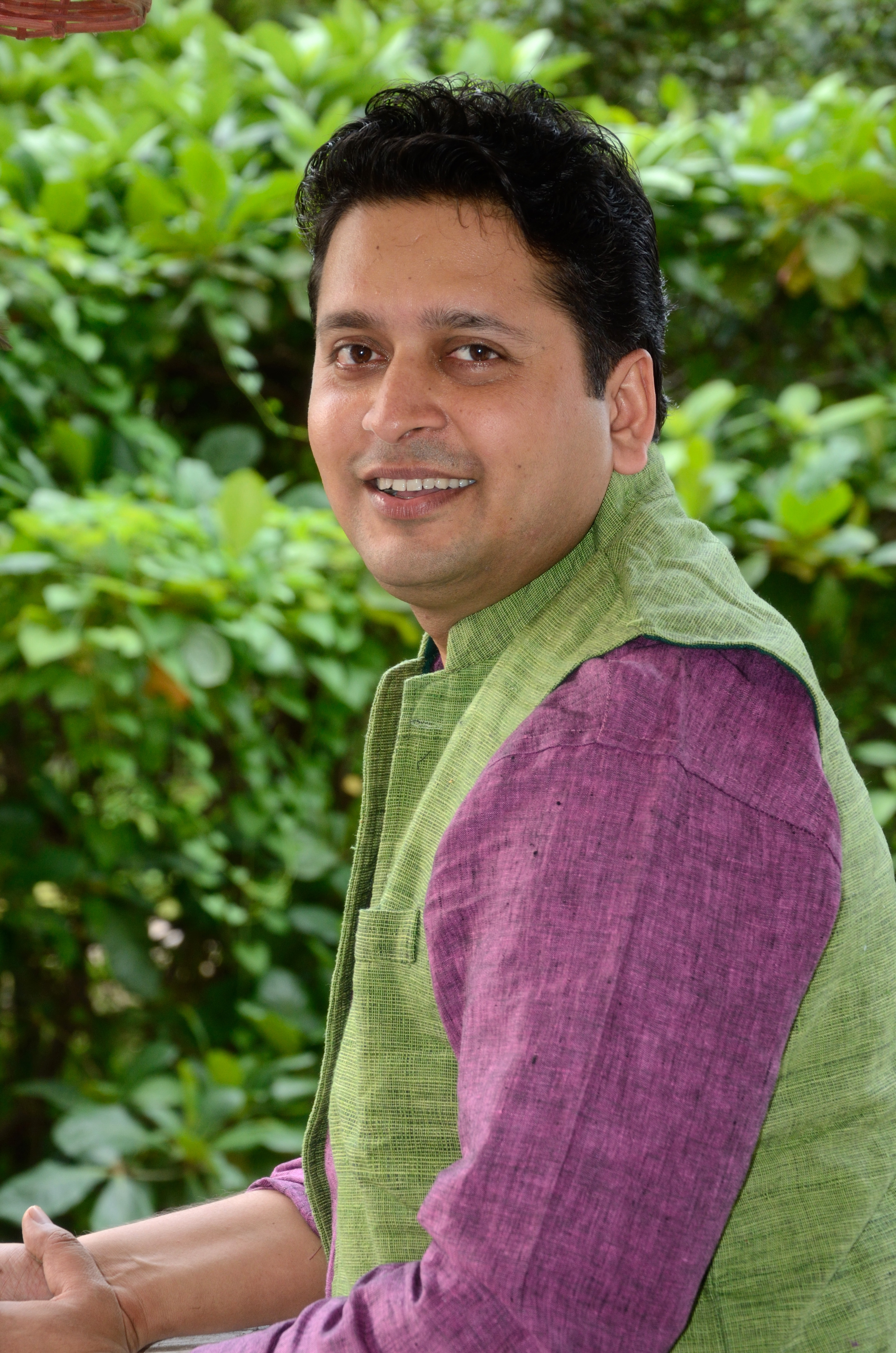
- Pankaj Dubey in 2019
- Born: Ranchi, Bihar, India (now in Jharkhand, India)
- Education: University of Delhi; Coventry School of Art and Design
- Writing career
- Language: English, Hindi
- Notable awards: Youth Icon Award for Social Entrepreneurship, Global Innoventure Award (2018)

Pankaj Dubey (born in Ranchi, Bihar, India) is a bilingual Indian novelist, screenwriter, cultural practitioner, and public intellectual whose work reflects the evolving voice of contemporary India across languages and mediums.

Published by Penguin Random House India, his novels span both English and Hindi, engaging with themes of aspiration, identity, and modern relationships. His writing often situates personal narratives within broader socio-political contexts, making his work both accessible and reflective of societal change.

== Early life and education ==
Pankaj Dubey was born in Ranchi, Bihar (now Jharkhand) and grew up in Chaibasa. His father was a professor of English literature. Dubey completed a Bachelor of Arts in History (1999) and LLB (2002) from the University of Delhi. He subsequently obtained a master’s degree in Applied Communications at Coventry School of Art and Design, UK, in 2003.

== Career ==
Dubey began his media career in 2003 as a presenter and journalist with the BBC World Service in London. He made his literary debut with the novel What a Loser! in 2013, which was simultaneously published in Hindi as Loser Kahin Ka!

His second novel, Ishqiyapa: To Hell with Love, was published by Penguin Books India's mass-market imprint Penguin Metro Reads in 2015. This was followed by Love Curry and Trending in Love, both contemporary romantic comedies. His fifth novel, One String Attached, is set in Ayodhya and explores themes of identity and conflict.

Dubey has conducted masterclasses on popular fiction and curated the first ever Nalanda Literature Festival in December 2025, focusing on emerging voices and contemporary storytelling.

=== Literary and public engagements ===
Pankaj Dubey has conducted workshops and masterclasses on popular fiction, focusing on storytelling craft and contemporary narrative practices.

He has also participated in literary festivals and curated cultural platforms, contributing to discussions around youth-oriented storytelling and bilingual literature in India.

=== Writing style and themes ===
Dubey's work is characterised by the use of humour and colloquial language to explore themes of relationships, aspiration, and identity in contemporary India.

He has described his bilingual writing process as "transcreation", in which narratives are adapted across Hindi and English rather than directly translated.

=== International recognition ===
Dubey was selected for the Seoul Art Space Writers’ Residency in South Korea, where he participated in the Asian Literature Creative Workshop.

He received the Global Innoventure Award for Literature and Storytelling at the House of Lords in London.

=== Podcast ===
Pankaj hosts a Chat Show titled “Small Towns Big Stories” on his You Tube Channel by the same name where he interacts with the inspiring and entertaining achievers of small towns in India from across the domains. Some of his guests include Dibyendu Bhattacharya, Divyanka Tripathi, Faisal Malik, Vivek Dahiya, Anushka Kaushik, Swanand Kirkire, Tarun Khanna, Sumona Chakravarti and Sugandha Mishra to name a few.

=== Old School Romance ===
Audible presents ‘Old School Romance’, an Audible Original created, written and hosted by Pankaj Dubey is an original audio series about love stories of pre-digital dating era, of twelve unheard anecdotes of celebrity couples from different walks of life whose love stories were never discussed before. He travelled to multiple cities, Mumbai, Chennai and Delhi in India to document the oral romantic history of his guests.

== Film and production ==
Dubey served as a script supervisor on Ghanchakkar (2013) and Chauranga (2014). He has also produced short films including Geelee (Wet Dreams) and Naach Ganesh (Dance of Ganesha).

In 2021, Dubey directed the short film Maratha Mandir Cinema, starring Sarika and Swanand Kirkire. The film focused on the cultural impact of Dilwale Dulhania Le Jayenge on sex workers in Mumbai’s Kamathipura. It was crowdfunded and nominated for the Jio Filmfare Short Film Awards, and was also screened at the Cannes and Vancouver film festivals.

== Social initiatives ==
In 2002, Dubey founded SPRIHA (Society for the Promotion and Inculcation of Human Aspirations), a non-governmental organization focused on youth empowerment and cultural education. Under SPRIHA, he initiated the Sadak Chhap Film Festival.

== Awards and recognition ==
- Navodit Lekhak Award, Delhi Hindi Academy (2002)
- Youth Icon Award for Social Entrepreneurship (2010)
- Selected for Writers’ Residency at Seoul Art Space Yeonhui-dong, South Korea (2016)
- Global Innoventure Award for Literature and Storytelling, awarded at the House of Lords, London (2018)

== Bibliography (selected) ==
- What A Loser! (English) 2013
- Loser Kahin Ka! (Hindi) 2013
- Ishqiyapa :To Hell With Love (English): :2015
- Ishqiyapa (Hindi) (2015)
- Love Curry (English): 2018
- Love Curry (Hindi): 2018
- Trending In Love (English):2020
- Trending In Love (Hindi):2020
- One String Attached (English) 2021
- Ishq Baaki (Hindi) 2024

== Filmography (selected) ==
- Maratha Mandir Cinema (Director, 2021)
- Naach Ganesh (Producer)
- Geelee (Producer)
- Chauranga (Script Supervisor)
- Ghanchakkar (Script Supervisor)
