= Bubble Gum (film) =

- Bubble Gum (2011)
- Directed by: Sanjivan Lal
- Written by: Sanjivan Lal; Rohit Gahlowt
- Produced by: Sushma Kaul Ravi
- Starring: Apoorva Arora; Tanvi Azmi; Sohail Lakhani; Delzad Sanjay Hiwale; Sachin khedekar
- Cinematography: Anshul Chobey
- Edited by: Suresh Pai
- Music by: Bapi Tutul; Haffu
- Release date: 29 July 2011
- Running time: 116 minutes
- Country: India
- Language: Hindi

Bubble Gum is a 2011 Hindi film directed by Sanjivan Lal. This film was released on July 29, 2011.

== Plot ==
Vedant, a humble kid in 10th grade at Loyola School Jamshedpur in 1980, falls in love with Jenny, the daughter of a police officer. He is enraged by Ratan, his rival, whom he is constantly jealous of since Jenny always appears to be around him. He often visits Jenny's house and strives to impress her father by touching his feet (an Indian tradition of respect). Vedant's mother is a teacher, while his father works for Tata Steel as an engineer. His parents are upset since he isn't preparing for his board exams, which are around the corner. The same day, they get a telegram from Vedant's deaf brother Vidur, notifying them that he has returned from his Delhi hostel after 4 years.

Vidur gets picked up at the railway station the next day. Vedant is delighted to finally see his brother. But one day, Vidur shuts the door to his house and wanders outside, completely forgetting that he is deaf. When his parents get home, they are startled to see Vedant outside. They call the fire department to use the ladder to go to their house's balcony so the fireman can open the door from inside. Mukund (Vedant's father) becomes enraged and declares that Vidur would always accompany him on outings.

Everyone starts laughing as he takes him outside and demonstrates how he plays kabaddi. Vedant becomes upset and tries to hit them. They complain to their father about how they are being treated. In the end, they all go on to marry other people, but Vedant keeps a picture of himself and Jenny at home.

== Cast ==
- Delzad Sanjay Hiwale - Vedant
- Apoorva Arora - Jenny
- Sohail Lakhani - Vidur
- Prabh Sharan - Jenny's friend
- Nabanita Banerjee - Vedant's friend
- Harshvardhan Poddar - Partho
- Nishchal Srivastava - Ravi
- Sachin Khedekar - Mukund Rawat
- Tanvi Azmi - Sudha Rawat
- Suraj Singh - Ratan Singh
- Ganesh Yadav - L F Rebello
- Sita Singh - Mrs. Rebello
- Azeen Khan - Jenny's friend

== Critical reception ==
Rajeev Masand selected Bubble Gum as one of the 5 films he recommended to his readers in 2011. The film was also listed among the best films of 2011 by Hindustan Times.

Bubble Gum achieved critical acclaim among the Indian critics. Mayank Shekhar of Hindustan Times awarded the film 3 out of 5 stars, saying that "the pic is a sweet, rare, candid personal piece".

Taran Adarsh of Bollywood Hungama states that "Bubble Gum has its heart in the right place. A film that arrives with zilch expectations, but succeeds in taking you back in time when life was simpler and sweet. Recommended!".
