= Monika Mundu =

Indian playback singer and actor (born 1971)

- Born: Monika Mundu; 17 February 1971 (age 54); Ranchi, Jharkhand
- Occupations: Teacher, actress, playback singer
- Years active: 1993–present
- Spouse: Tej Mundu
- Awards: Aparajita Award (2008); Sanskritik Samman (2015)

Monika Mundu is an Indian playback singer and actress. She has sung songs in 12 languages including Nagpuri, Bengali, Hindi, Mundari, Santali, Khortha and Kurukh. Her first film was Jharkhand kar Chhaila, She also acted in film M.S. Dhoni: The Untold Story.

== Filmography ==
=== Films ===
Year	Film	Role	Language	Notes
2008	Jharkhand kar Chhaila		Nagpuri	
2016	M.S. Dhoni: The Untold Story		Hindi	
2018	Mor Gaon Mor Desh		Nagpuri	
2018	Ilaka Kishoreganj		Hindi	
2019	Phulmania		Nagpuri	

== Awards and honors ==
- Aparajita Award (2008)
- Sanskritik Samman (2015) by Kala Sanskriti Vibhag.
