= Deepak Lohar =

Actor

- Born: Jharkhand
- Education: National School of Drama
- Occupation: Actor

Deepak Lohar is an actor who mostly acts in Nagpuri and Hindi films. He graduated from the National School of Drama. He is known for the films Jharkhand Kar Chhaila, Chamku, Ilaka Kishoreganj and Namaha Shivaya Shantaya.

== Filmography ==
Key
†	Denotes films that have not yet been released

Year	Film	Role	Language	Notes
2008	Jharkhand Kar Chhaila	Birsa	Nagpuri	Best male actor
2008	Chamku	Assassin	Hindi	
2009	Namah Shivaya Shantaya	Kaungkali	Hindi	
2010	Barabar (Equal)	Nagada Announcer	Hindi	
2011	Karma		Nagpuri	
2018	Ilaka Kishoreganj	Tony	Hindi	
2021	Ranchi Romeo		Nagpuri	
2024	Jatra: Ek Prem Katha		Nagpuri	

== Awards ==
Ceremony	Category	Year	Result	Reference
Cine Kala Awards	Best male actor	2008	Won	
