= Nandlal Nayak =

- Born: 1973 (age 52–53); Bokba, Simdega, Jharkhand, India
- Education: Gossner College, Ranchi
- Occupations: Folk artist, Music Composer, director
- Spouse: Wendy Jehlen (m. 1997)
- Children: Anika Nayak; Kayala Nayak
- Father: Mukund Nayak

Nandlal Nayak is an Indian folk artist, music composer and a film director. He was music director of national award winner feature film Amu(2005). He promotes folk music among Indian Youth and rest of the world. He is a member of Sangeet Natak Akademi.

== Life ==
=== Early life and family ===
Nandlal Nayak is born in the lineage of traditional folk artist family in his ancestral village of Bokba in 1973 and grew up Ranchi. He is the son of Padmashri Mukund Nayak. He grew up surrounded by the rhythms, melodies and folklore of Jharkhand. He completed his graduation from Gossner College, Ranchi. He married American dancer Wendy Jehlen in 1997.

=== Career ===
In 1990s, he was a modern nagpuri solo singer. After marriage with American dancer Wendy Jehlen (Bharatnatyam, Odisi and modern) in 1997, he moved to Boston, United States. He resided in Italy two years for Benetton's Farica Musica project. Then he worked in fusion CDs in Italy but due copy right of Benetton, he took his tracks and left. After returning Ranchi, he produced a nagpuri movie based on human trafficking but it was never released due to financial issue. As a Ford Scholar Nandlal Nayak travelled across globe, not only to spread the fragrance of folk music of Jharkhand to the world, but also to collaborate with the musicians and film-makers from USA, Japan, Ghana, Germany, Italy, Austria, Great Britain etc. Films and music of Nandlal showcases his global exposure, yet grounded in his folk tradition. Nayak has been an ambassador of Jharkhandi music, dance, film and culture for over a decade.

He was music director of national award winner feature film Amu(2005). He composed music of Nagpuri film Chhoti which was based on human trafficking in 2009. He was music director of nagpuri film Phulmania which premiered at Jharkhand International Film Festival Awards (JIFFA) 2019 and the 72nd Cannes Film Festival in France. Directed by Nandlal, feature film Dhumkkudiya showcases the issue of Human Trafficking of tribal youths from Jharkhand, in the name of domestic help.

== Filmography ==
Key
†	Denotes films that have not yet been released

Year	Film	Language	Lyrics	Singer	Music director	director	Notes	Ref(s)
2000	In the Mood for Love	English					Percussion	
2005	Amu	Hindi			Yes		Film won National Award	
2009	Chhoti	Nagpuri			yes			
2009	Baha	Nagpuri	Yes	Yes			won Special filmmaker award in 24th Black International Cinema- Berlin & USA, Best Film and Best Director awards in First Santhali and Regional Language film festival in Tatanagar	
2019	Phulmania	Nagpuri & Hindi			Yes	Lal Vijay Shahdeo		
2019	The Last Supper	Hindi		Yes				
2019	Dhumkkudiya (film)	Nagpuri			Yes	Yes	The film has won more than 60 awards around the world	
2023	Lohardaga	Hindi		yes	Yes	Lal Vijay Shahdeo		

== Awards ==
- Creative Award from the National Endowment for the Arts, USA, 2005.
- Senior Performing Artist Fellowship Award from the American Institute of Indian Studies, 2004.
- Creative Artist Award form the Japan-US friendship Commission/National Endowment for the arts, 2003.
- Award and Citation from the Massachusetts Legislature for contribution to the cultural life of Massachusetts, 1996.
- INDROADS award from the Institute for International Education/Ford Foundation, 1996.
- Selected Awards for Amu: FIPRESCI Critics Award, January 2005.
- Jury Award, Torino, Italy (Cine Donne Film Festival) October 2005.
- Best Producers, February Award, Hollywood Blood Horror Festival (2020)
- Best Director, American Golden Picture International Film Festival, USA (2020)
- Best Director, Mabig Film Festival, Augsburg, Germany (2020)
