= Phulmania =

Hindi/Nagpuri film

- Directed by: Lal Vijay Shahdeo
- Written by: Birendra Paswan; Lal Vijay Shahdeo
- Produced by: Lal Vijay Shahdeo; Nitu Aggarwal; Amrita Shahdeo
- Starring: Komal Singh; Vineet Kumar; Nitu Pandey; Khusboo Sharma; Hansraj Jagtap; Ravi Bhatia; Reena Sahay; Monika Mundu
- Cinematography: Ajit Singh
- Edited by: Ansari Nuren
- Music by: Nandlal Nayak
- Production company: Akriti Entertainment Pvt. Ltd.
- Distributed by: Akriti Entertainment Pvt. Ltd.
- Release dates: 6 September 2019 (Nagpuri); 20 November 2020 (Hindi)
- Running time: 120 minutes
- Country: India
- Languages: Nagpuri; Hindi

Phulmania (2019) is an Indian, Nagpuri & Hindi film directed by Lal Vijay Shahdeo and produced by Lal Vijay Shahdeo, Nitu Agarwal and Amrita Shahdeo. The film features Komal Singh as the female lead. The story of the film is based on the practice of witch hunting and infertility issues. The film was premiered at Jharkhand International Film Festival Awards (JIFFA) 2019 and the 72nd Cannes Film Festival in France. This film was also shot in Hindi and released on ShemarooMe, Jio TV, Airtel, VI etc.

== Plot ==
The film is based on a true incident that happened in Jharia. The story of the film is on issues of witch hunting, gender discrimination and female infertility.

== Cast ==
- Komal Singh as Phulmania
- Ravi Bhatia as Jay
- Hansraj Jagtap as Battakad
- Vineet Kumar as Jay's father
- Nitu Pande as Jay's mother
- Monika Mundu as Phulmania's mother
- Khusboo Sharma as Priti
- Ankit Rathi as Rishi
- Sunny Sharma as Phulmania's brother
- Shailendra Sharma as Karmu
- Rina Sahay

== Sound Tracks ==
The music has been composed by Nandlal Nayak. Jyoti Sahu has given her voice in two songs and Mukund Nayak in one.

== Controversy ==
The film ran into trouble due to its poster.

== Release ==
The film released on 6 September 2019 in state capital Ranchi. The censor board issued the release certificate without any cuts. This is the first Nagpuri film released at a Multiplex.

== Reception ==
The film mostly received positive reviews.
