= Lal Vijay Shahdeo =

Indian film Director, Producer and Writer

- Born: Hesapiri, Lohardaga, Jharkhand, India
- Citizenship: Indian
- Occupations: Film director, producer
- Years active: 1997–present
- Awards: Jharkhand Gaurav Sammaan (2019)
- Website: www.akritientertainment.com

Lal Vijay Shahdeo is an Indian writer, director and producer in the Indian film and television industry.

== Early life ==
He was born in Hesapiri village in Kisko block of Lohardaga. Shahdeo has worked as a theatre director, actor, to his shift to television/film as casting director, writer, producer and finally a film writer, director and producer.

== Career ==
Shahdeo has worked with many companies such as UTV, Percept Picture Company, B.R. Films, Creative Eye, Miditech and Big Synergy. Shahdeo had the opportunity to work with television channels in India, including Star Plus, Star One, Sony, Zee TV and Hungama. He has worked as a casting director, senior executive producer, creative director, supervising producer, head of operations, project head, writer and director.

He has directed short film, The Silent Statue, which was accepted at Cannes Film Festival 2016 in Short Film Corner. Shahdeo directed feature films Lohardaga in Hindi, Nagpuri/Hindi debut Phulmania premiered in the Jharkhand International Film Festival Awards (JIFFA) in 2018 and 2019 respectively. Films Lohardaga and Phulmania also premiered in the 2019 Cannes Film Festival. In 2022, he wrote and directed Bhojpuri/Hindi film Nach Baiju Nach which released on 23 September 2022. He has written directed & produced a feature Film "Mere Naina Tere Naina" released on 2 June 2023 in Hindi/Awadhi languages.

== Filmography ==
=== Film and television ===
Year	Project	Role	Company	Channel
2001–2004	"Kehta Hai Dil, Shakalaka Boom Boom, Bhabhi, Family Business, Special Squad"	Casting Director	UTV	Star Plus & Star One
2006–2007	Mann Mein Hai Vishwaas	Senior Executive Producer & Casting Director	Creative Eye Limited	Sony
2007–2008	Pari Hoon Main	Supervising Producer & Director	B. R. Films	Star One
2008–2009	Ninja Pandav	Supervising Producer	Miditech Pvt. Ltd.	Real TV
2009–2010	Hamaari Devrani	Head of Operations	Shobhna Desai Productions	Star Plus
2010–2011	Maayke Se Bandhi Dor	Project Head (Fiction)	UTV	Star Plus
2012–2013	Laakhon Mein Ek	Head of Operations	Big Synergy	Star Plus
2014	Ghanteshwar Prasad Ghantewaale	Producer & Director	Akriti Entertainment Pvt. Ltd.	Doordarshan
2014–2015	Ye Shaadi Hai Ya Sauda	Producer & Director	Akriti Entertainment Pvt. Ltd.	Doordarshan
2021	Black Suitcase (Hindi & English Film)	Director / Producer	Akriti Entertainment Pvt. Ltd.	Under pre production
2016	The Silent Statue (Short Film)	Director / Producer	Akriti Entertainment Pvt. Ltd.	Released on Youtube (Akriti Cinemas)
2021	Phulmania (Hindi Film)	Director / Producer / Writer	Akriti Entertainment Pvt. Ltd.	World Digital Premiered on ShemarooMe, JioCinema
2019	Phulmania (Nagpuri Film)	Director / Producer / Writer	Akriti Entertainment Pvt. Ltd.	Released
2019	Compensation (Short Film)	Director / Writer	Deepak Simhal Productions	Released
2023	Lohardaga (Hindi Feature Film)	Director / Writer	Akriti Entertainment Pvt. Ltd.	Released
2022	Naach Baiju Naach (Bhojpuri/Hindi Film)	Writer / Director / Producer	Akriti Entertainment Pvt. Ltd.	Released
2023	Mere Naina Tere Naina (Hindi/Awadhi Film)	Writer / Director / Producer	Akriti Entertainment Pvt. Ltd.	Released
2023	Kokh (Bhojpuri Film)	Writer / Producer	Akriti Entertainment Pvt. Ltd.	Released

== Controversies ==
In 2019, Shahdeo accused the organiser of second Jharkhand International Film Festival Awards, of mismanagement and bribery.

== Awards and honors ==
- Jharkhand Gaurav Sammaan (2019)
- Birsa Munda Jyoti Samman (2021) for best film director.
