= Dinesh Deva =

Actor

- Born: Ranchi, Jharkhand
- Occupations: Actor; Dancer
- Years active: 2001–present

Dinesh Deva is an Indian actor and dancer. He works in Nagpuri albums and Nagpuri films. He has been working in the industry since 2001. He is known for the Nagpuri albums and films Nagpur Kar Bhoot, Mahuua, Hum Bhi to Ashique Hain and Gangwa.

== Career ==
He started working in nagpuri albums and films in the year of 2001. He acted in film Nagpur kar Bhoot, which was a horror comedy movie. In 2013, he acted in the movie Bunga re Bunga, a Kurukh film. In 2018, he acted in the movie Mahuua, which won best Nagpuri film of 2018 in Jharkhand International Film Festival Awards. His upcoming movie is Gangwa, in which actor of Jharkhand Bunty Singh and well known Bollywood actors Ranjeet and Hemant Birje have acted. The film is directed by Aditya Kumar, the actor of Gangs of Wasseypur – Part 2. In 2022, he acted in Nagpuri film "Karma Dharma", a film about the Karam festival which was released on YouTube.

== Filmography ==
Key
†	Denotes films that have not yet been released

Year	Film	Role	Language	Notes
2005	Hum Bhi to Ashique Hain		Nagpuri	
2006	Nagpur Kar Bhoot		Nagpuri	
2013	Bunga re Bunga		Kurukh	
2018	Mahuua		Nagpuri	Won best Nagpuri film award in Jharkhand International Film Festival Awards, 2018
2020	†Gangwa		Nagpuri	
2022	Karma Dharma		Nagpuri	
