= Rajesh Jais =

Film actor

- Born: Ranchi, Jharkhand, India
- Education: National School of Drama, New Delhi
- Occupation: Actor
- Years active: 1994-present
- Website: https://www.rajeshjais.com

Rajesh Jais is an Indian actor who works in Hindi films and television. He is known for the Indian soap opera, Shanti (1994).

== Early life ==
Rajesh Jais was born in Ranchi, Jharkhand, India. He is a graduate from the National School of Drama in Delhi.

== Career ==
Jais worked as a journalist for Ranchi Express. He notably appeared in the soap opera, Shanti in 1994.

He has acted in films such as Rab Ne Bana Di Jodi (2008), Rocket Singh (2009), Airlift (2016) and Raazi (2018), Missing (2018), Why Cheat India (2019), Indu Ki Jawani (2020), Roohi (2020), Akelli (2023), and Tu Jhoothi Main Makkaar (2023).

== Filmography ==
Year	Title	Role	Notes
1995	Oh Darling Yeh Hai India	Aman Pratap Ahuja	
2003	Matrubhoomi: A Nation Without Women	Princess Pinky	
2003	Joggers' Park		
2007	Johnny Gaddaar	Policeman	
2008	Tashan	Pankaj Tiwari	
2008	Yeh Mera India	Kaul's son-in-law	
2008	Rab Ne Bana Di Jodi	Khanna	
2009	Life Partner	Jignesh D. Patel	
2009	Rocket Singh: Salesman of the Year	Choudhary	
2016	Airlift	Indian Embassy Official	
2016	Raman Raghav 2.0	Farid Haq	
2017	Ajab Singh Ki Gajab Kahani	Kisandev	
2018	Sonu Ke Titu Ki Sweety	Sweety's father	
2018	Missing	Ganga Narayan	
2018	Raazi	Sarwar	
2018	Karim Mohammed	Aaftaab	
2019	Why Cheat India	Prosecution lawyer	
2019	Fastey Fasaatey	Ajit	
2019	Dhumkkudiya	Minister	
2019	Judgementall Hai Kya	Pandey Ji	
2020	Indoo Ki Jawani	Indu's father	
2021	Roohi	Roohi's Father	
2021	Chhorii	Kajala	Amazon Prime Video film
2022	Kahani Rubberband Ki	Suryakant	
2022	Mili	Mohan Chachu	
2023	Tu Jhoothi Main Makkaar	Mr. Malhotra	
2023	Akelli	Ranjit Chawla	
2023	Nimmo Lucknow Wali	Khan Sahab	
2023	Non Stop Dhamaal	Mr. Bansal	
2023	Lakeerein	Purushottam Bharti	
2024	Dashmi	Commissioner	
2025	Hisaab Barabar	Bank Manager	
2025	Saale Aashiq	Charanjit Rewal	
2025	Chhorii 2	Kajla	
2025	Aankhon Ki Gustaakhiyan	Saba's father	

== Television ==
Year	Show	Role	Notes
1994	Shanti	Nanu	Recurring role
1997	Byomkesh Bakshi	Phani Chakraborty	1 episode
1999	Stars Bestsellers: Zebra	-	
2007	Agadam Bagdam Tigdam	Bobby	
2008	Akbar Birbal Remixed	-	TV Mini Series
2009	Kya Mast Hai Life	Baby sir	
2011	Dekha ek khwab	Murari lal	
2011-2012	Iss Pyaar Ko Kya Naam Doon	Mahendra Singh Raizada	
2014	Adaalat	Advocate	3 Episodes
2014	Shastri Sisters	Narayan Shastri	
2015	Crime Patrol	Prakash Surve	3 episodes
2020	Panchayat	Virendra Gupta	1 Episode
2020	Paatal Lok	Shukla Ji	1 Episodes
2020	Scam 1992	CL Khemani Head Of State Bank Of India	3 Episodes
2021	Inside Edge	Sports Minister	6 Episodes
2021	Rudrakaal	CBI Officer	Recurring
2022	Tanaav	NSA Dheeraj Saran	4 Episodes
2023	Rana Naidu	OB	10 Episodes
2023	Jehanabad - Of Love & War	Rajendra Mishra	10 Episodes
2025	Bada Naam Karenge	Vivek Rathi	9 Episodes
2025	Vasudha	Surya Singh Rathod	

== Awards and nominations ==
Year	Award Show	Award	Film	Result
2017	Hissar Film Festival	Best Supporting actor	Brina	
2018	Rajasthan International Film Festival	Best supporting actor	Kareem Mohammed	
2019	Rajasthan International Film Festival	Best Actor	The Last Supper & Gandhi The Mahatma	
2020	Hollywood Blood Horror Festival	Best Acting Ensemble	Dhumkkudiya	Won
