= Mor Gaon Mor Desh =

Nagpuri film

- Directed by: Ashwini Kumar
- Produced by: Alka Singh
- Starring: Deepak Sinha; Chandan Kumar Jaiswal; Rishi Prakash Mishra; Payel Mukherjee; Varsha Rittu Lakra
- Music by: Srikant Indwar
- Production company: Sri Alka Entertainment Pvt. Limited
- Release date: 13 July 2018
- Running time: 148 minutes
- Country: India
- Language: Nagpuri
- Budget: ₹50 Lakh

Mor Gaon Mor Desh (2018) is an Indian, Nagpuri language drama romance film directed by Ashwini Kumar and produced by Alka Singh. The film features Deepak Sinha and Payel Mukherjee in prominent roles.

== Plot ==
The film focuses on the intense situation that develops in a man's village -Bharno in Jharkhand over the exploitation of farmers by money lenders and rescue mission of an educated son of a farmer.

== Cast ==
- Deepak Sinha
- Chandan Kumar Jaiswal
- Rishi Prakash Mishra
- Payel Mukherjee
- Varsha Rittu Lakra

== Sound Track ==
Music Composer of film are Jaikant-Srikant. There are six songs in the film. The Singer Mitali Ghosh, Monika Mundu, Jyoti Sahu, Late Vishnu Nayak, Ravi Shankar Barwar, Rohan Dev Pathak have given their voice in these songs.
