= Supriya Kumari =

Indian television actress

- Born: Ranchi, Jharkhand, India
- Education: St. Xavier's College
- Occupation: Actress
- Years active: 2009–present
- Spouse: Rishikesh Ingle (m. 2014)

Supriya Kumari is an Indian actress. She is known for her role in Indian television series Bairi Piya, Looteri Dulhan, Anudamini and Sanskaar – Dharohar Apnon Ki. She also acted in Hindi film Ekkees Toppon Ki Salaami.

== Early life ==
She was born in the city of Ranchi. Her father works in a government job and her mother is a homemaker. She studied at S.S Doronda Girls High School and completed her graduation from St. Xavier's College, Ranchi. She worked in Doordarshan as a child artist and dancer. She is trained in Kathak.

== Career ==
She started working on the Nagpuri and Khortha albums in Jharkhand. Some albums became hits. She has worked in more than 50 albums. In 2005, She acted in Nagpuri film Awara Tore Pyar Mein. In 2009, she acted in Indian Hindi television series Agle Janam Mohe Bitiya Hi Kijo. Then she acted in Bairi Piya serial in a lead role as Amoli on Colors channel. Then she acted in lead roles in other serials such as Looteri Dulhan, Anudamini and Mere Sai - Shraddha Aur Saburi. She also acted in Hindi film Zindagi 50 50 and Ekkees Toppon Ki Salaami in lead roles. She also acted in web show Chhotki Chhatanki.

== Television ==
Year	Serial	Role	Notes	Ref.
2009	Bairi Piya	Amoli Digvijay Singh	Debut Role	
2009	Agle Janam Mohe Bitiya Hi Kijo	Shanichariya		
2010	Rakt Sambandh	Priya		
2010	Armanon Ka Balidaan-Aarakshan	Meethi		
2011	Looteri Dulhan	Looteri Dulhan		
2012	Savdhaan India: Crime Alert			
2013	Sanskaar - Dharohar Apnon Ki			
2014	Anudamini	Anudamini		
2017	Mere Sai - Shraddha Aur Saburi			
2018	Laal Ishq	Bindiya		
2022	Chhotki Chhatanki	Chhotki		
2023–2024	Tose Naina Milai Ke	Kuhu Chandel	Season 1	
2026	Tose Naina Milai Ke	Pihu Singh Choudhary	Season 2	

== Filmography ==
Year	Film	Role	Notes	Ref.
2005	Awara Tore Pyar Mein		nagpuri film	
2013	Zindagi 50 50	Rupa		
2014	Ekkees Toppon Ki Salaami	Sushma Joshi		
