= Jharkhand International Film Festival Awards =

Film awards

- Awarded for: Excellence in cinematic achievements
- Country: India
- First award: 2018
- Website: www.jiffawards.com

The Jharkhand International Film Festival Awards (also known as the JIFFA) are a set of awards presented annually to film makers and artists for theirs contribution to Cinema. It aims to provide common platform for cinemas of world to project excellence of film arts. It supports filmmaking and promotion of all genres.

== History ==
The first Jharkhand International film festival had held on 2018 in Mega Sports Complex of State capital of Jharkhand in Ranchi.

== Awards ceremonies ==
The following is a list of Jharkhand International Film Festival Awards ceremonies since 2018.

| Ceremony | Date | City | Notes |
|---|---|---|---|
| 1st JIFFA | 1 to 3 Feb 2018 | Ranchi | |
| 2nd JIFFA | 25 to 27 May 2019 | Ranchi | |
| 3rd JIFFA | 1st to 11th Oct 2020 | Ranchi | (online) |
| 4th JIFFA | 29 to 30 Oct 2021 | Ranchi | |
| 5th JIFFA | 17 to 18 Dec 2022 | Ranchi | |

== Awards ==
=== Global/Hindi ===
- Films on Mahatma Gandhi (Documentary, Short, Feature)
- Short Films
- Documentary Films
- Student / Diploma films
- Feature Films
- Animation Films

=== Indian Regional ===
- Short Films
- Documentary Films
- Student / Diploma films
- Feature Films
- Animation Films
- Music & Video Albums

=== Jharkhand Regional ===
- Short Films
- Documentary Films
- Student / Diploma films
- Feature Films
- Animation Films
- Music & Video Albums

== See also ==
- Cinema of Jharkhand
- Cinema of India
