= List of T-Series films =

T-Series is an Indian music record and film production company, based in Mumbai. It was founded by Gulshan Kumar as a music label in 1983. While best known as a music label, T-Series has also produced 100s of films in Hindi cinema under the banner of T-Series Films.

T Series official logo

== 1980s ==
^{DTV} Direct-to-video film
^{SO} Unreleased film; only soundtrack of film released

Year	Film	Actors	Ref
1989	Lal Dupatta Malmal Ka^{[DTV]}	Sahil Chaddha, Veverly	
1989	Phir Lehraya Lal Dupatta Malmal Ka^{[DTV]}	Sahil Chaddha, Veverly	
1989	Abhi To Main Jawan Hoon^{[DTV]}		
1989	Gawaahi	Zeenat Aman, Shekhar Kapur, Ranjeeta Kaur, Ashutosh Gowariker	

== 1990s ==
^{DTV} Direct-to-video film
^{SO} Unreleased film; only soundtrack of film released

Year	Film	Actors	Ref
1990	Aashiqui	Rahul Roy, Anu Aggarwal, Deepak Tijori	
1990	Bahaar Aane Tak	Roopa Ganguly, Moon Moon Sen, Sumeet Saigal, Tariq Shah	
1991	Jeena Teri Gali Mein	Suraj, Kavita Kapoor	
1991	Ayee Milan Ki Raat	Avinash Wadhavan, Shaheen	
1991	Naagmani	Shikha Swaroop, Sumeet Saigal	
1991	Dil Hai Ke Manta Nahin	Aamir Khan, Pooja Bhatt, Anupam Kher, Tiku Talsania	
1992	Jeena Marna Tere Sang	Sanjay Dutt, Raveena Tandon	
1992	Sangeet	Madhuri Dixit, Jackie Shroff	
1992	Meera Ka Mohan	Ashwini Bhave, Avinash Wadhavan	
1992	Shiv Mahima		
1992	Maina^{[SO]}		
1993	Aaja Meri Jaan		
1993	Kasam Teri Kasam		
1993	Do Dilon Ka Sangam^{[SO]}		
1994	Shabnam	Kanchan, Sanjay Mitra, Alok Nath	
1994	Aaja Sanam (film delayed for 2 years)	Avinash Wadhavan, Chandni, Paresh Rawal	
1994	Jai Maa Vaishno Devi		
1994	Main Tera Aashiq^{[SO]}		
1994	Chahat^{[SO]}		
1995	Deewana Sanam^{[DTV]}		
1995	Bewafa Sanam		
1995	Surya Putra Shani Dev^{[DTV]}		
1995	Shree Satyanarayan Vrat Katha^{[DTV]}		

== 2000s ==
Year	Film	Actors	Ref
2000	Papa The Great	Krishan Kumar, Nagma	
2001	Tum Bin	Sandali Sinha, Priyanshu Chatterjee, Himanshu Malik	
2002	Jee Aayan Nu	Harbhajan Mann, Priya Gill	
2003	Aapko Pehle Bhi Kahin Dekha Hai	Priyanshu Chatterjee, Sakshi Shivanand, Om Puri	
2004	Muskaan	Aftab Shivdasani, Gracy Singh	
2005	Lucky: No Time for Love	Salman Khan, Sneha Ullal, Mithun Chakraborty	
2006	Humko Deewana Kar Gaye	Akshay Kumar, Katrina Kaif, Bipasha Basu, Anil Kapoor	
2007	Darling	Fardeen Khan, Esha Deol	
2007	Bhool Bhulaiyaa	Akshay Kumar, Ameesha Patel, Vidya Balan, Shiney Ahuja	
2008	Karzzzz	Himesh Reshammiya, Urmila Matondkar, Dino Morea, Shweta Kumar, Danny Denzongpa, Rohini Hattangadi, Smita Bansal, Gulshan Grover, Bakhtiyaar Irani, Raj Babbar, Himani Shivpuri, Tareena Patel, Asrani, Sudhir Dalvi, Imran Hasnee, Shiva Rindani	
2009	Radio: Love on Air	Himesh Reshammiya, Sonal Sehgal, Shenaz Treasurywala, Zakir Hussain, Paresh Rawal, Megha Narkar, Urvashi Yadav, Himani Shivpuri, Megha Chatterji, Akhil Mishra	
2009	Life Partner	Govinda, Fardeen Khan, Tusshar Kapoor, Genelia D'Souza, Prachi Desai	

== 2010s ==
Year	Film	Actors	Notes	Ref
2010	Aashayein	John Abraham, Sonal Sehgal	Co-production with Percept Picture Company	
2010	Kajraare	Himesh Reshammiya, Sara Loren, Amrita Singh, Natasha Sinha, Gaurav Chanana, Javed Shaikh, Gulshan Grover, Anupam Shyam, Adnan Shah		
2011	Patiala House	Akshay Kumar, Anushka Sharma	Co-production with Hari Om Entertainment and Credence Motion Pictures	
2011	Ready	Salman Khan, Asin, Paresh Rawal	Co-production with Sohail Khan Productions	
2013	Nautanki Saala!	Ayushmann Khurrana, Pooja Salvi, Kunaal Roy Kapur	Co-production with R.S. Entertainment	
2013	Aashiqui 2	Aditya Roy Kapur, Shraddha Kapoor	Co-production with Vishesh Films	
2014	Yaariyan	Rakul Preet Singh		
2014	Bhoothnath Returns	Amitabh Bachchan, Boman Irani	Co-production with B.R. Films	
2014	Hate Story 2	Surveen Chawla, Jay Bhanushali	Co-production with Vikram Bhatt productions	
2014	Creature 3D	Bipasha Basu, Imran Abbas		
2015	Baby	Akshay Kumar, Rana Daggubati, Taapsee Pannu	Co-production with Friday Filmworks, Cape of Good Films & Hari Om Entertainment	
2015	Roy	Arjun Rampal, Jacqueline Fernandez, Ranbir Kapoor		
2015	Ek Paheli Leela	Sunny Leone	Co-production with Paper Doll Entertainment	
2015	I Love NY	Sunny Deol, Kangana Ranaut		
2015	All Is Well	Abhishek Bachchan, Asin, Rishi Kapoor	Alchemy Productions	
2015	Bhaag Johnny	Kunal Khemu, Zoa Morani, Mandana Karimi	Co-production with Vikram Bhatt productions	
2015	Hate Story 3	Sharman Joshi, Karan Singh Grover, Zarine Khan, Daisy Shah	Co-production with Vikram Bhatt productions	
2016	Sanam Re	Pulkit Samrat, Yami Gautam		
2016	Airlift	Akshay Kumar, Nimrat Kaur	Co-production with Abundantia Entertainment, Cape of Good Films, Emmay Entertainment, Hari Om Entertainment	
2016	Teraa Surroor	Himesh Reshammiya, Farah Karimaee, Naseeruddin Shah, Shekhar Kapur, Monica Dogra, Kabir Bedi, Shernaz Patel, Abhishek Duhan, Suneel Dutt, Graham Mollory, Ann Marie O'Connor, Richard O'Leary, Warren Renwick, Maneesh Chandra Bhatt, Niraj Singh, Ravi Singh, Tereza, Naresh Suri	Co-production with HR Musik Limited	
2016	Sarbjit	Aishwarya Rai Bachchan, Randeep Hooda	Co-production with Pooja Entertainment, Legend Studios	
2016	Raaz: Reboot	Emraan Hashmi, Kriti Kharbanda	Co-production with Vishesh Films	
2016	Tum Bin 2	Neha Sharma, Aditya Seal, Aashim Gulati	Co-production with Benaras Mediaworks	
2016	Wajah Tum Ho	Sana Khan, Sharman Joshi, Gurmeet Choudhary		
2016	Junooniyat	Pulkit Samrat, Yami Gautam		
2017	Noor	Sonakshi Sinha, Purab Kohli	Co-production with Abundantia Entertainment	
2017	Hindi Medium	Irrfan Khan	Co-production with Maddock Films	
2017	FU: Friendship Unlimited	Akash Thosar, Satya Manjrekar	Marathi film; co-production with Cut2Cut Movies	
2017	Raabta	Sushant Singh Rajput, Kriti Sanon	Co-production with Maddock Films	
2017	Baadshaho	Ajay Devgn, Emraan Hashmi, Vidyut Jammwal, Ileana D'Cruz, Esha Gupta	Co-production with Vertex Motion Pictures	
2017	Simran	Kangana Ranaut	Co-production with Karma Features, Adarsh Telemedia & Fortune Films (USA)	
2017	Bhoomi	Sanjay Dutt, Aditi Rao Hydari	Co-production with Legend Studios	
2017	Chef	Saif Ali Khan	Co-production with Abundantia Entertainment, Bandra West Pictures	
2017	Tumhari Sulu	Vidya Balan	Co-production with Ellipsis Entertainment	
2018	Sonu Ke Titu Ki Sweety	Kartik Aaryan, Nushrat Bharucha, Sunny Singh	Co-production with Luv Films	
2018	Hate Story 4	Urvashi Rautela, Vivan Bhatena, Ihana Dhillon, Karan Wahi		
2018	Raid	Ajay Devgn, Ileana D'Cruz, Saurabh Shukla	Co-production with Panorama Studios	
2018	Blackmail	Irrfan Khan, Kirti Kulhari	Co-production with RDP Motion Pictures	
2018	Fanney Khan	Anil Kapoor, Aishwarya Rai, Rajkummar Rao	Co-production with Rakeysh Omprakash Mehra Pictures, Anil Kapoor Films & Communication Network	
2018	Satyameva Jayate	John Abraham, Manoj Bajpayee, Aisha Sharma, Amruta Khanvilkar	Co-production with Emmay Entertainment	
2018	Batti Gul Meter Chalu	Shahid Kapoor, Shraddha Kapoor, Yami Gautam	Co-production with Kriti Pictures	
2019	Why Cheat India	Emraan Hashmi, Shreya Dhanwanthary	Co-production with Emraan Hashmi Films, Ellipsis Entertainment	
2019	De De Pyaar De	Ajay Devgn, Tabu, Jimmy Sheirgill, Rakul Preet Singh	Co-production with Luv Films	
2019	Bharat	Salman Khan, Katrina Kaif, Disha Patani	Co-production with Salman Khan Films, Reel Life Productions	
2019	Kabir Singh	Shahid Kapoor, Kiara Advani	Co-production with Cine1 Studios	
2019	Malaal	Meezaan Jaffery, Sharmin Segal	Co-production with Bhansali Productions	
2019	Arjun Patiala	Kriti Sanon, Diljit Dosanjh, Varun Sharma	Co-production with Maddock Films	
2019	Khandaani Shafakhana	Sonakshi Sinha, Badshah, Varun Sharma, Annu Kapoor	Co-production with Sundial Productions	
2019	Batla House	John Abraham, Mrunal Thakur	Co-production with JA Entertainment, Emmay Entertainment	
2019	Saaho	Prabhas, Shraddha Kapoor	Co-production with UV Creations; trilingual film (Hindi, Tamil, and Telugu)	
2019	Section 375	Akshaye Khanna, Richa Chaddha, Rahul Bhat, Meera Chopra	Co-production with Panorama Studios	
2019	Daaka	Gippy Grewal, Zarine Khan	Co-production with Humble Motion Pictures; Punjabi film	
2019	Satellite Shankar	Sooraj Pancholi, Megha Akash	Co-production with Cine1 Studios	
2019	Marjaavaan	Siddharth Malhotra, Ritesh Deshmukh, Rakul Preet Singh, Tara Sutaria	Co-production with Emmay Entertainment	
2019	Pagalpanti	Anil Kapoor, John Abraham, Ileana D'Cruz, Arshad Warsi, Pulkit Samrat, Kriti Kharbanda, Urvashi Rautela, Saurabh Shukla	Co-production with Panorama Studios	
2019	Pati Patni Aur Woh	Kartik Aaryan, Bhumi Pednekar, Ananya Panday	Co-production with B.R. Studios	

== 2020s ==
Key
†	Denotes films that have not yet been released

Year	Film	Actors	Notes	Ref
2020	Tanhaji	Ajay Devgn, Saif Ali Khan, Kajol, Sharad Kelkar	Co-production with Ajay Devgn FFilms	
2020	Jai Mummy Di	Sunny Singh, Sonnalli Seygall, Supriya Pathak, Poonam Dhillon	Co-production with Luv Films	
2020	Street Dancer 3D	Varun Dhawan, Shraddha Kapoor, Prabhu Deva, Nora Fatehi	Co-production with Remo D'Souza Entertainment	
2020	Malang	Anil Kapoor, Aditya Roy Kapur, Disha Patani, Kunal Khemu	Co-production with Luv Films and Northern Lights Entertainment	
2020	Shubh Mangal Zyada Saavdhan	Ayushmann Khurrana, Jitendra Kumar, Gajraj Rao, Neena Gupta	Co-production with Colour Yellow Productions	
2020	Thappad	Taapsee Pannu, Pavail Gulati	Co-production with Benaras Media Works	
2020	Ludo	Abhishek Bachchan, Rajkummar Rao, Fatima Sana Shaikh, Aditya Roy Kapur, Sanya Malhotra, Pankaj Tripathi, Rohit Suresh Saraf, Pearle Maaney, Inayat Verma	Co-production with Anurag Basu Productions; released on Netflix	
2020	Chhalaang	Rajkummar Rao, Nushrat Bharucha	Co-production with Luv Films, Ajay Devgn FFilms; released on Amazon Prime Video	
2020	Durgamati	Bhumi Pednekar, Arshad Warsi, Mahie Gill	Co-production with Abundantia Entertainment, Cape of Good Films; released on Amazon Prime Video	
2020	Indoo Ki Jawani	Kiara Advani, Aditya Seal, Mallika Dua	Co-production with Emmay Entertainment, Electric Apples	
2021	Madam Chief Minister	Richa Chadda, Manav Kaul, Akshay Oberoi, Saurabh Shukla	Co-production with Kangra Talkies Production	
2021	Tuesdays and Fridays	Anmol Dhillon, Jhataleka Malhotra, Zoa Morani, Reem Sheikh, Parmeet Sethi	Co-production with Bhansali Productions	
2021	Mumbai Saga	John Abraham, Emraan Hashmi, Jackie Shroff, Suniel Shetty, Prateik Babbar, Gulshan Grover, Rohit Roy, Amole Gupte	Co-production with White Feather Films	
2021	Saina	Parineeti Chopra	Co-production with Front Foot Pictures	
2021	Koi Jaane Na	Kunal Kapoor, Amyra Dastur	Co-production with Amin Hajee Film Company	
2021	Sardar Ka Grandson	Arjun Kapoor, Rakul Preet Singh, Neena Gupta	Co-Production with Emmay Entertainment and JA Entertainment; released on Netflix	
2021	Sherni	Vidya Balan	Co-production with Abundantia Entertainment; released on Amazon Prime Video	
2021	Haseen Dillruba	Taapsee Pannu, Vikrant Massey, Harshvardhan Rane	Co-production with Colour Yellow Productions and Eros International; released on Netflix	
2021	Bhuj: The Pride of India	Ajay Devgn, Sanjay Dutt, Sonakshi Sinha, Nora Fatehi, Ammy Virk, Pranitha Subhash	Co-production with Ajay Devgn FFilms and Select Media Holdings LLP; released on Disney+ Hotstar	
2021	Shiddat	Sunny Kaushal, Radhika Madan, Mohit Raina, Diana Penty	Co-production with Maddock Films; released on Disney+ Hotstar	
2021	Dybbuk	Emraan Hashmi, Nikita Dutta, Manav Kaul	Co-production with Panorama Studios; released on Amazon Prime Video	
2021	Satyameva Jayate 2	John Abraham, Divya Khosla Kumar	Co-production with Emmay Entertainment	
2021	Chhorii	Nushrat Bharucha	Co-production with Crypt TV, Abundantia Entertainment; released on Amazon Prime Video	
2021	Chandigarh Kare Aashiqui	Ayushmann Khurrana, Vaani Kapoor	Co-production with Guy in the Sky Pictures	
2021	Atrangi Re	Dhanush, Sara Ali Khan, Akshay Kumar	Co-production with Colour Yellow Productions, Cape of Good Films; released on Disney+ Hotstar	
2022	Jhund	Amitabh Bachchan	Co-production with Tandav Films Entertainment Pvt. Ltd & Aatpaat Films	
2022	Toolsidas Junior	Sanjay Dutt, Rajiv Kapoor, Dalip Tahil, Varun Buddhadev	Co-production with Ashutosh Gowariker Productions	
2022	Radhe Shyam	Prabhas, Pooja Hegde	Bilingual film (Telugu and Hindi); Co-production with UV Creations	
2022	Jalsa	Vidya Balan, Shefali Shah	Co-production with Abundatia Entertainment released on Amazon Prime Video	
2022	Hurdang	Sunny Kaushal, Nushrratt Bharuccha, Vijay Varma	Co-production with Karma Media and Entertainment	
2022	Bhool Bhulaiyaa 2	Kartik Aaryan, Kiara Advani, Tabu	Co-production with Cine1 Studios	
2022	Anek	Ayushmann Khurrana	Co-production with Benaras Mediaworks	
2022	Sherdil: The Pilibhit Saga	Pankaj Tripathi	Co-production with Reliance Entertainment	
2022	Hit: The First Case	Rajkummar Rao, Sanya Malhotra	Co-production with Dil Raju Production	
2022	Ek Villain Returns	John Abraham, Arjun Kapoor, Disha Patani, Tara Sutaria	Co-production with Balaji Motion Pictures	
2022	Dhokha: Round D Corner	R. Madhavan, Khushalii Kumar, Aparshakti Khurana, Darshan Kumar		
2022	Vikram Vedha	Hrithik Roshan, Saif Ali Khan, Radhika Apte, Rohit Saraf	Co-production with YNOT Studios, Friday Filmworks & Reliance Entertainment	
2022	Nazar Andaaz	Kumud Mishra, Divya Dutta, Abhishek Banerjee	Co-production with Kathputli Creations	
2022	Code Name: Tiranga	Parineeti Chopra, Harrdy Sandhu	Co-production with Reliance Entertainment, Film Hanger	
2022	Thank God	Ajay Devgn, Sidharth Malhotra, Rakul Preet Singh	Co-production with Maruti International	
2022	Honeymoon	Gippy Grewal, Jasmin Bhasin	Co-production with Baweja Studios	
2022	Tara Vs Bilal	Harshvardhan Rane, Sonia Rathee	Co-production with JA Entertainment	
2022	Double XL	Sonakshi Sinha, Huma Qureshi, Mahat Raghavendra, Zaheer Iqbal	Co-production with Wakaoo Films, Elemen3 Entertainment and Reclining Seats Cinema Production	
2022	Thai Massage	Gajraj Rao, Divyenndu Sharma, Sunny Hinduja, Anil Charanjeett, Alina Zasobina	Co-production with Window Seat Films and Reliance Entertainment	
2022	Drishyam 2	Ajay Devgn, Shriya Saran, Tabu, Akshaye Khanna, Ishita Dutta	Co-production with Panorama Studios and Viacom18 Studios	
2022	Mister Mummy	Riteish Deshmukh, Genelia D'Souza, Mahesh Manjrekar	Co-production with Hectic Cinema & Bound Script Pictures	
2022	An Action Hero	Ayushmann Khurrana, Jaideep Ahlawat	Co-production with Colour Yellow Productions	
2022	Cirkus	Ranveer Singh, Pooja Hegde, Jacqueline Fernandez	Co-production with Reliance Entertainment, Rohit Shetty Picturez	
2023	Kuttey	Arjun Kapoor, Konkona Sen Sharma, Naseeruddin Shah, Tabu, Radhika Madan, Kumud Mishra, Shardul Bharadwaj	Co-production with Luv Films & VB Films	
2023	Faraaz	Juhi Babbar, Aamir Ali, Pallak Lalwani	Co-production with Benaras Media Works, Mahana Films	
2023	Shehzada	Kartik Aaryan, Kriti Sanon, Paresh Rawal, Manisha Koirala	Co-production with Allu Entertainment, Brat Films, Haarika & Hassine Creations	
2023	Tu Jhoothi Main Makkaar	Ranbir Kapoor, Shraddha Kapoor	Co-production with Luv Films	
2023	Bholaa	Ajay Devgn, Tabu	Co-production with Reliance Entertainment, Dream Warrior Pictures and Ajay Devgn FFilms	
2023	Gumraah	Aditya Roy Kapur, Mrunal Thakur		
2023	Adipurush	Prabhas, Saif Ali Khan, Kriti Sanon	Bilingual film in Hindi and Telugu; co-production with Retrophiles Productions	
2023	Sukhee	Shilpa Shetty, Kusha Kapila	Co-produced with Abudantia Entertainment	
2023	Yaariyan 2	Divya Khosla Kumar, Pearl V Puri, Meezaan Jafri, Anaswara Rajan, Priya Prakash Varrier, Yash Dasgupta, Warina Hussain, Lillete Dubey	Co-production with BLM Pictures	
2023	Starfish	Khushalii Kumar, Milind Soman, Ehan Bhat, Tusharr Khanna	Co-production with Almighty Motion Picture	
2023	Animal	Ranbir Kapoor, Anil Kapoor, Bobby Deol, Rashmika Mandanna, Triptii Dimri	Co-production with Bhadrakali Pictures Productions and Cine 1 Studios	
2024	Srikanth	Rajkummar Rao, Jyothika, Alaya F, Sharad Kelkar, Jameel Khan	Co-produced with Chalk N Cheese Film	
2024	Savi	Anil Kapoor, Divya Khosla Kumar, Harshvardhan Rane	Co-produced with Vishesh Films	
2024	Phir Aayi Hasseen Dillruba	Taapsee Pannu, Vikrant Massey, Sunny Kaushal	Co-produced by Colour Yellow Productions; released on Netflix	
2024	Ghudchadi	Sanjay Dutt, Raveena Tandon, Parth Samthaan, Khushalii Kumar, Aruna Irani	Co-produced with Keep Dreaming Pictures; released on JioCinema	
2024	Mr. Bachchan	Ravi Teja, Jagapathi Babu, Bhagyashri Borse	Telugu film; Co-produced with People Media Factory and Panorama Studios	
2024	Khel Khel Mein	Akshay Kumar, Taapsee Pannu, Fardeen Khan, Ammy Virk, Vaani Kapoor, Aditya Seal, Pragya Jaiswal	Co-Produced with Wakaoo Films and White World Production	
2024	Vicky Vidya Ka Woh Wala Video	Rajkummar Rao, Triptii Dimri	Co-produced with Balaji Motion Pictures, Wakaoo Films and Thinkink Picturez	
2024	Bhool Bhulaiyaa 3	Kartik Aaryan, Vidya Balan, Madhuri Dixit, Triptii Dimri	Co-produced with Cine1 Studios	
2025	Fussclass Dabhade	Amey Wagh, Siddharth Chandekar, Kshitee Jog	Marathi film; Co-produced by Colour Yellow Productions, Chalchitra Mandalee	
2025	The Diplomat	John Abraham, Sadia Khateeb	Co-produced by JA Entertainment, Wakao Films, Fortune Films and Seeta Films	
2025	Chhorii 2	Nushrat Bharucha, Soha Ali Khan, Gashmeer Mahajani	Co-production with Abundantia Entertainment, Pshych Film, Tamarisk Lane; released on Amazon Prime Video	
2025	Raid 2	Ajay Devgn, Riteish Deshmukh, Vaani Kapoor, Saurabh Shukla	Co-produced by Panorama Studios	
2025	Metro... In Dino	Aditya Roy Kapur, Sara Ali Khan, Anupam Kher, Neena Gupta, Pankaj Tripathi, Konkona Sen Sharma, Ali Fazal, Fatima Sana Shaikh	Co-produced with Anurag Basu Production	
2025	De De Pyaar De 2	Ajay Devgn, R. Madhavan, Rakul Preet Singh	Co-produced by Luv Films	
2025	Tere Ishk Mein	Dhanush, Kriti Sanon	Co-produced by Colour Yellow Productions	
2026	Border 2	Sunny Deol, Diljit Dosanjh, Varun Dhawan, Ahan Shetty, Mona Singh, Sonam Bajwa, Anya Singh, Medha Rana	Co-produced by J. P. Films	
2026	Assi	Taapsee Pannu, Kani Kusruti, Revathi, Manoj Pahwa, Kumud Mishra, Mohammed Zeeshan Ayyub, Naseeruddin Shah, Supriya Pathak, Seema Pahwa	Co-produced by Benaras Media Works	
2026	Pati Patni Aur Woh Do	Ayushmann Khurrana, Sara Ali Khan, Wamiqa Gabbi, Rakul Preet Singh, Vijay Raaz, Tigmanshu Dhulia, Vishal Vashishtha, Durgesh Kumar, Ayesha Raza Mishra, Deepika Amin, Guneet Singh, Shireesh Kumar Sharma	Co-produced by B.R. Studios	
2026	Dhamaal 4	Ajay Devgn, Riteish Deshmukh, Arshad Warsi, Sanjay Mishra, Jaaved Jaaferi, Esha Gupta, Sanjeeda Sheikh, Anjali Anand, Upendra Limaye, Vijay Patkar, Ravi Kishan	Co-produced by Panorama Studios, Devgn Films, Maruti International	
2026	Unmadham	Kunchacko Boban, Lijomol Jose	Malayalam film; Co-produced by Panorama Studios	
2026	Irumudi	Ravi Teja, Priya Bhavani Shankar, P. Sai Kumar, Baby Nakshatra	Telugu film; Co-produced by Mythri Movie Makers	
2026	Ranabaali	Vijay Deverakonda, Rashmika Mandanna, Arnold Vosloo	Telugu film; Co-produced by Mythri Movie Makers	
2027	Khosla Ka Ghosla 2 †	Anupam Kher, Boman Irani, Ravi Kishan, Divya Khosla Kumar, Ranvir Shorey, Parvin Dabas, Tara Sharma, Kiran Juneja, Nishank Verma, Kangan Baruah Nangia, Danish Iqbal	Co-produced by Tandav Films; releasing on 5 March 2027	
2027	Fauzi †	Prabhas, Imanvi, Mithun Chakraborty, Jaya Prada, Anupam Kher, Chaithra J Achar	Telugu film; Co-produced by Mythri Movie Makers; releasing on 19 March 2027	
2027	Untitled film †	Kartik Aaryan, Sreeleela	Releasing on 30 April 2027	
2027	Dada: The Sourav Ganguly Story †	Rajkummar Rao	Co-produced by Luv Films, DBL; releasing on 14 May 2027	
2027	Police Company †	Harshvardhan Rane, Fardeen Khan, Saurabh Shukla, Paresh Rawal, Fatima Sana Shaikh, Makarand Deshpande, Ashwini Kalsekar	Co-produced by RGV Company; releasing on 4 June 2027	
2027	Dragon †	N. T. Rama Rao Jr., Anil Kapoor, Biju Menon, Rukmini Vasanth, Khushbu Sundar, Guru Somasundaram, Rajeev Kanakala, Ashutosh Rana, Anshumaan Pushkar, Sidhant Gupta, Prabhas Sreenu, Shatru, Shiva, Bimal Oberoi, Prince Grootboom, Aleksandr Mizev, Benedict Garrett	Telugu film; Co-produced by Mythri Movie Makers, N. T. R. Arts; releasing on 11 June 2027	
2027	Captain India †	Kartik Aaryan, Parvathy Thiruvothu, Manish Chaudhari	Co-produced by Baweja Studios, Midnight Chai Films; releasing on 13 August 2027	
2027	Spirit †	Prabhas, Triptii Dimri, Vivek Oberoi, Kanchana, Aishwarya Desai	Telugu film; Co-produced by Bhadrakali Pictures; releasing on 29 October 2027	

== See also ==
- Cinema of India
- List of film production companies in India
