= Akashaditya Lama =

Indian filmmaker, screenwriter and playwright

- Occupations: Film director; screenwriter; playwright
- Years active: 2001–present
- Notable work: Cigarette Ki Tarah; Nani Teri Morni; Tauba Tera Jalwa; Bengal 1947; Dulhaniya Le Aaeegi

Akashaditya Lama is an Indian film director, screenwriter and playwright whose work spans Hindi cinema, television and theatre. He worked as an assistant director during the making of Gadar: Ek Prem Katha and made his feature-film directorial debut with Cigarette Ki Tarah in 2012.

Lama directed the Children's Film Society of India production Nani Teri Morni, a Nagamese-Hindi children's film based on the story of child bravery-award recipient Mhonbeni Ezung. The film premiered in Kohima in October 2018 and was subsequently screened at the 49th International Film Festival of India. His subsequent films include Tauba Tera Jalwa and Bengal 1947, both released in 2024.

He has served on film-selection juries, including the Eastern regional panel for the 66th National Film Awards and the non-feature-film jury for the Indian Panorama section of the 52nd International Film Festival of India.

== Career ==
=== Television and early film work ===
Lama worked as an assistant director under filmmaker Anil Sharma during the production of Gadar: Ek Prem Katha. He subsequently worked as a television writer. An IANS report credited him with writing for the Hindi television series Kkusum, Kumkum, Chehra and Jhilmil Sitaaron Ka Aangan Hoga. A report in the Mumbai Mirror also identified him as a writer of Kumkum, Kkusum and Hamari Betiyoon Ka Vivaah.

In a 2024 interview, Lama said that he had written additional dialogue for the 2010 film Lahore before moving into feature-film direction.

=== Theatre ===
Mumbai Theatre Guide reported that Lama established the Big Bang Theatres Foundation in 2011. Its early production Mohenjodaro incorporated the Indian performance forms Thang-Ta and Chhau.

The Hindi-language play, written by Lama and directed by Kulvinder Bakshish, opened in Mumbai in June 2011. A 2014 feature in The Tribune described Lama as the play's writer and producer. The production was set against a fictionalised conflict involving the Indus Valley civilisation and combined drama, live music, martial arts and dance.

=== Film direction ===
Lama's first feature film as director was the Hindi romantic thriller Cigarette Ki Tarah, released in 2012.

He later directed Nani Teri Morni, produced by the Children's Film Society, India. The film concerns Mhonbeni Ezung, a girl from Nagaland who rescued her grandmother and sought help by travelling through forest terrain. It used a predominantly child cast and was filmed in Nagaland in the Nagamese language, with some Hindi. The Indian Express described the production as a turning point in Nagamese filmmaking because of the attention it received outside Northeast India.

Lama wrote and directed Tauba Tera Jalwa, starring Ameesha Patel, Jatin Khurana and Angela Krislinzki. Production began before the COVID-19 pandemic, and the film was theatrically released in January 2024.

His next film, Bengal 1947, was a Hindi historical drama set during the 1947 partition of Bengal. The film was adapted from his stage work Shabri Ka Mohan and was released on 29 March 2024.

As of 20 July 2026, Lama's forthcoming film Dulhaniya Le Aaeegi, starring Khushali Kumar, Mahesh Manjrekar, Piyush Mishra and Snehil Dixit Mehra, was scheduled for theatrical release on 24 July 2026. The film was produced by Siddharth Banerjee, Lama and Vikas Aggarwal.

=== Jury work ===
Lama was a member of the Eastern regional panel that evaluated feature films for the 66th National Film Awards, covering Assamese, Bengali, Odia and other northeastern-language entries. In 2021, he was one of the seven members of the non-feature-film jury that selected the Indian Panorama programme for the 52nd International Film Festival of India.

== Selected filmography ==
| Year | Title | Role | Notes |
|---|---|---|---|
| 2010 | Lahore | Additional dialogue | - |
| 2012 | Cigarette Ki Tarah | Director | Feature-film directorial debut |
| 2018 | Nani Teri Morni | Director | Nagamese-Hindi children's film produced by the Children's Film Society, India |
| 2024 | Tauba Tera Jalwa | Writer and director | - |
| 2024 | Bengal 1947 | Writer and director | Historical drama |
| 2026 | Dulhaniya Le Aaeegi | Director and producer | - |

== Selected television writing credits ==
| Series | Role |
|---|---|
| Kkusum | Writer |
| Kumkum | Writer |
| Chehra | Writer |
| Jhilmil Sitaaron Ka Aangan Hoga | Writer |
| Hamari Betiyoon Ka Vivaah | Writer |

== Selected theatre work ==
| Year | Title | Role | Ref. |
|---|---|---|---|
| 2011 | Mohenjodaro | Writer and producer | |

== Mohenjo Daro copyright litigation ==
In 2015, Lama alleged that the makers of Ashutosh Gowariker's film Mohenjo Daro had used material from a story he had developed and later adapted for the stage. He sent legal notices to the film's producers and sought to prevent its production and release.

In August 2016, the Bombay High Court dismissed Lama's application for an injunction against the film's release. The court found that copyright infringement had not been established and ordered Lama to pay costs of ₹150,000.
