= Dulhaniya Le Aaeegi =

2026 Indian Hindi-language comedy-drama film

- Theatrical release poster
- Directed by: Akashaditya Lama
- Written by: Jayant Gupta
- Produced by: Siddharth Banerjee; Akashaditya Lama; Vikas Aggarwal
- Starring: Khushalii Kumar; Mahesh Manjrekar; Piyush Mishra; Omkar Kapoor; Snehil Dixit Mehra
- Cinematography: Duleep Regmi
- Edited by: Dillip Kumar Routray
- Music by: Songs: Jazim Sharma; Abhishek Ray; Addy Singh; Arushi Krishna; Score: Amar Mohile
- Production companies: Aleo Cine Sagas; Think Tank Global; Spira
- Distributed by: First Film Studios
- Release date: 24 July 2026
- Running time: 128 minutes
- Country: India
- Language: Hindi

Dulhaniya Le Aaeegi is a 2026 Indian Hindi-language comedy-drama film directed by Akashaditya Lama and written by Jayant Gupta. It was produced by Siddharth Banerjee, Akashaditya Lama and Vikas Aggarwal under the banners Aleo Cine Sagas, Think Tank Global and Spira. The film stars Khushalii Kumar, Mahesh Manjrekar, Piyush Mishra, Omkar Kapoor and Snehil Dixit Mehra, with Agu Stanley Chiedozie in a supporting role.

The story follows Navya, an unmarried 32-year-old woman whose planned wedding descends into confusion after several prospective grooms enter the picture. It was theatrically released in India on 24 July 2026.

== Plot ==
Navya is the 32-year-old daughter of Devi Prasad, a wealthy and influential businessman. Subjected to persistent social pressure over her unmarried status, she eventually agrees to a lavish wedding arranged by her family.

The preparations are disrupted when several prospective grooms appear and competing claims, concealed motives and family egos come to the surface. What was intended to be a conventional wedding begins to resemble a modern-day swayamvar, as Navya and her family try to determine the identity and intentions of the actual groom.

== Cast ==
- Khushalii Kumar as Navya
- Mahesh Manjrekar as Devi Prasad, Navya's father
- Piyush Mishra
- Omkar Kapoor
- Snehil Dixit Mehra
- Agu Stanley Chiedozie
- Larissa Bonesi, in a special appearance in the song "Byaah To Baad"

== Production and marketing ==
The project was publicly promoted in June 2026. Filmmaker Priyadarshan, with whom Lama had previously worked, congratulated the director and described the project as a family entertainer.

The first-look poster was unveiled on 24 June 2026. It depicted Kumar wearing red bridal clothing, wedding jewellery and dark sunglasses while lying on a pile of colourful turbans. Kumar said that she was attracted to Navya's bold, emotional and unapologetic personality, while Lama described the film as a story about families, relationships and an unconventional bride.

Jayant Gupta wrote the film. Duleep Regmi served as cinematographer, Dillip Kumar Routray edited it, Shankar Samanta handled production design, Neetu Bhardwaj designed the costumes and Jayesh Pradhan served as choreographer. The background score was composed by Amar Mohile.

The official trailer was released on 16 July 2026. It introduced the film's central wedding conflict and the arrival of multiple prospective grooms.

== Music ==
The film's songs were composed by Jazim Sharma, Abhishek Ray, Addy Singh and Arushi Krishna, with lyrics by J. P. Gangwar and Divyesh Mungra. The soundtrack was issued by Aleo Music and consists of five songs.

Track listing
No.	Title	Artist(s)	Length
1	"Byaah To Baad"	Riyaa Sengupta, Kaavir and Arushi Krishna	3:55
2	"Kar Le Shaadi"	Jazim Sharma, Deepali Sathe and Rimi Dhar	4:09
3	"Laadli"	Pratibha Singh Baghel and Abhishek Ray	3:57
4	"Jalwa"	Jazim Sharma and Suvarna Tiwari	4:19
5	"Superstar Baba"	Jayati Vaidya and Addy Singh	4:00

Track information and durations are adapted from Spotify and YouTube Music.

"Kar Le Shaadi", picturised on Manjrekar and Kumar, is structured as a playful exchange in which a father encourages his daughter to marry. It was sung by Jazim Sharma, Deepali Sathe and Rimi Dhar, composed by Sharma and written by J. P. Gangwar.

"Jalwa" was performed by Suvarna Tiwari and Jazim Sharma, composed by Sharma and written by J. P. Gangwar. "Byaah To Baad" was performed by Riyaa Sengupta, Kaavir and Arushi Krishna; Krishna composed the song and J. P. Gangwar wrote its lyrics.

== Release ==
Dulhaniya Le Aaeegi received a U/A certificate dated 16 July 2026. The certification listing reported a running time of 128 minutes. BookMyShow also lists the film as a 128-minute Hindi comedy-drama-family film with a U/A 13+ classification. Contemporary listings and reviews otherwise reported runtimes of either 127 or 128 minutes. First Film Studios LLP handled distribution. The film opened theatrically in India on 24 July 2026.

== Reception ==
The Indo-Asian News Service review published by The Siasat Daily awarded the film 3.5 out of 5 stars. It praised Kumar's performance, the father–daughter relationship, the supporting cast and the integration of the music, describing the film as an engaging family entertainer.
