= Aditya Lakhia =

Indian actor

- Born: India
- Occupation: Actor
- Years active: 1988 - present

Aditya Lakhia is an Indian character actor. He did his schooling from Mayo College, Ajmer and graduation from St. Xavier's College, Ahmedabad. He began his acting career in 1988 playing small roles and worked as an assistant director in Akele Hum Akele Tum. The character of Kachra in the movie Lagaan remains one of his most memorable performances. He is working in various supporting roles.

He has worked in Chotti Bahu Season 2 and Agle Janam Mohe Bitiya Hi Kijo on television.

His late brother Ashish Lakhia also was part of the film industry and worked as an Art Director.

== Filmography ==
- Om-Dar-B-Dar (1988)
- Rihaee (1988)
- Jo Jeeta Wohi Sikandar (1992)
- Kabhi Haan Kabhi Naa (1993)
- Akele Hum Akele Tum (1995) (assistant director)
- X Zone as Viren (episode 87–88) (1998)
- Ssshhhh...Koi Hai (2001)
- Lagaan: Once Upon a Time in India (2001)
- Humraaz (2002)
- 3 Deewarein (2003) as Malli
- Mumbai Se Aaya Mera Dost (2003)
- Kuchh Meetha Ho Jaye (2005)
- Ramji Londonwale (2005)
- Ek Ajnabee (2005) as Sammy
- Tom, Dick, and Harry (2006)
- Gafla (2006)
- Shootout at Lokhandwala (2007)
- Shaurya as Capt R. P Singh(2008)
- Mission Istaanbul (2008)
- Agle Janam Mohe Bitiya Hi Kijo (2009–2011) as Nanku; Laali's father
- Kaalo (2010) as Raghu
- Riwayat (2010)
- Stanley Ka Dabba (2011)
- The Sholay Girl (2019)
- Koi Jaane Na (2021)
- Bengal 1947 (2024)
