= Tulsi Kumar =

Indian singer (born 1986)

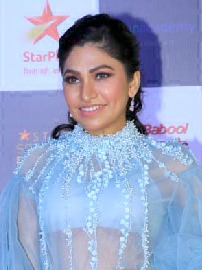
- Kumar at the Screen Awards in 2019
- Born: Tulsi Kumar Dua; 15 March 1986 (age 40)
- Occupations: Playback singer; radio jockey; musician; actress
- Years active: 2005–present
- Organisation: T-Series Kids Hut (YouTube channel)
- Spouse: Hitesh Ralhan (m. 2015)
- Parents: Gulshan Kumar (father); Sudesh Kumari (mother)
- Relatives: Bhushan Kumar (brother); Khushalii Kumar (sister); Krishan Kumar (uncle); Divya Khosla Kumar (sister-in-law)
- Family: Kumar family
- Musical career
- Genres: Pop; R&B; Folk
- Instruments: Vocals
- Label: T-Series

Tulsi Kumar (born Tulsi Kumar Dua, 15 March 1986), is an Indian playback singer, radio jockey, musician, and actress in the Bollywood industry. She was born to businessman Gulshan Kumar, the former owner of T Series who also worked as a singer, and his wife Sudesh Kumari. She is also the sister of film producer Bhushan Kumar and actress Khushalii Kumar. She also owns Kids Hut, a YouTube channel owned by record label T-Series, featuring children's content including nursery rhymes and stories.

== Personal life ==
Kumar was born as Tulsi Kumar Dua in a Punjabi Hindu family to, businessman and founder of T-Series, Gulshan Kumar and his wife Sudesh Kumari. Divya Khosla Kumar is Tulsi's sister-in-law, the wife of her brother Bhushan Kumar (current director of T-Series).

In 2015, she married businessperson Hitesh Ralhan in Nepal. The couple has a son, born in 2017.

== Career ==
In 2009, her debut album, Love Ho Jaaye, was released. Along with the album, Kumar made a music video for the title track. She also sang "Mujhe Teri" from the movie Paathshaala, "Love Mera Hit" from the film Billu with Neeraj Shridhar, and "Tum Jo Aaye" from Once Upon a Time in Mumbaai.

She sang the song "Mainu Ishq Da Lagya Rog" in 2015, through which her sister Khushali made her screen debut. It is a recreated version of the original song from the 1991 film Dil Hai Ke Manta Nahin.

Kumar sang "Soch Na Sake", "Sanam Re", "Nachange Sari Raat", "Ishq Di Latt", "Salamat", "Dekh Lena", "Wajah Tum Ho", "Dil Ke Pass", and "Dil Mein Chupa Lunga" in 2016 she also worked with Guru Randhawa in "Enni Soni" in 2019.

In 2020, during the COVID-19 lockdown, she released several songs where she collaborated with Darshan Raval on "Tere Naal", Millind Gaba on "Naam". Her blockbuster single "Tanhaai" was released on T-Series official YouTube channel and has gained over 11 crore views on YouTube.

In 2021, Kumar released the single "Pehle Pyaar Ka Pehla Gham" sung along with Jubin Nautiyal. The music video features Parth Samthaan and her sister Khushali. In February 2021, she released a new song "Main Jis Din Bhula Doon" along with Nautiyal which featured Himansh Kohli and Sneha Namanandi.

She was seen hosting season 2 of Indie Hai Hum in February 2021.

Later on, she released her blockbuster romantic hit ''Is Qadar'' sung along with Darshan Raval and the music video features them both.

On 30 June 2021, Kumar and Nautiyal's Amazon Prime Mixtape season 3 was out. The songs in the mixtape were "Tera Chehra" and "Jaan Meri'.

On 5 October 2021, Raval and Kumar's "Tera Naam" (marketed under the #ShaadiWalaSong) was released. This is the third collaboration of this duo. The song hit 9 million views and was trending on #2 on YouTube Global Charts within 24 hours of release.

== Accolades ==
Kumar has won several accolades including the International Indian Film Academy award for Best Female Playback Singer and the Mirchi Music Award – Listener's Choice Song of the Year in 2017 for the song "Soch Na Sake" from the film Airlift, and Mirchi Music Awards – Best Album in 2020 for the soundtrack to Kabir Singh. She has also been nominated for the IIFA Best Female Playback Singer in 2010 and 2019.

== Discography ==
Denotes films that have not yet been released

=== Films ===
Year(s)	Film/Album(s)	Song(s)	Music Director(s)	Co-singer(s)
2006	Chup Chup Ke	"Mausam Hai Bada Qatil"	Himesh Reshammiya	Sonu Nigam
2006	Chup Chup Ke	"Shabe Firaaq"	Himesh Reshammiya	Himesh Reshammiya
2006	Humko Deewana Kar Gaye	"Humko Deewana Kar Gaye"	Anu Malik	Sonu Nigam
2006	Humko Deewana Kar Gaye	"Humko Deewana Kar Gaye – Sad II"	Anu Malik	Solo
2006	Humko Deewana Kar Gaye	"Tum Sansoon Main"	Himesh Reshammiya	Himesh Reshammiya
2006	Aksar	"Mohabbat Ke"	Himesh Reshammiya	Himesh Reshammiya
2006	Tom, Dick, and Harry	"Tere Sang Ishq"	Himesh Reshammiya	Himesh Reshammiya
2006	Phir Hera Pheri	"Dil Naiyyo Maane Re"	Himesh Reshammiya	Himesh Reshammiya
2006	Ahista Ahista	"Dil Naiyyo Maane Re"	Himesh Reshammiya	Himesh Reshammiya
2006	Dil Diya Hai	"Afsana"	Himesh Reshammiya	Himesh Reshammiya
2006	Dil Diya Hai	"Mile Ho Tum"	Himesh Reshammiya	Himesh Reshammiya
2006	Rocky: The Rebel	"Teri Yaad Bichake Sota Hoon"	Himesh Reshammiya	Himesh Reshammiya
2006	Zindaggi Rocks	"Meri Dhoop Hai Tu"	Anu Malik	Javed Ali
2007	Aggar	"Aggar"	Mithoon	Hamsa
2007	Darling	"Akele Tanha"	Pritam	Solo
2007	Darling	"Saathiya"	Pritam	Adnan Sami
2007	Darling	"Hasaye Bhi"	Pritam	Shaan
2007	Darling	"Tadap Tadap"	Pritam	Himesh Reshammiya
2007	Raqeeb	"Tum Ho"	Pritam	Zubeen Garg
2007	Nehlle Pe Dehlla	"Parvar Digara"	Pritam	KK
2007	Nehlle Pe Dehlla	"Dil Naaiyo Mane Re"	Pritam	Himesh Reshammiya
2007	Bhool Bhulaiyaa	"Let's Rock Soniye"	Pritam	Shaan
2007	Bhool Bhulaiyaa	"Sakiya Re Sakiya"	Pritam	Solo
2008	Karzzzz	"Tere Bin Chain Na Aave"	Himesh Reshammiya	
2008	Karzzzz	"Soniye Je Tere"	Himesh Reshammiya	
2009	Billu	"Love Mera Hit Hit"	Pritam	Neeraj Shridhar
2009	Jai Veeru	"Sufi"	Bappi Lahiri	Saim Bhatt
2009	8 X 10 Tasveer	"Hafiz Khuda"	Salim–Sulaiman	Mohit Chauhan
2009	8 X 10 Tasveer	"Kuch Is Tarah"	Salim–Sulaiman	Mohit Chauhan
2009	8 X 10 Tasveer	"Aaja Maahi"	Salim–Sulaiman	Neeraj Shridhar
2010	Dulha Mil Gaya	"Shiri Farhad"	Pritam	Neeraj Shridhar
2010	Chance Pe Dance	"Rishta Hai Mera"	Adnan Sami	Shaan
2010	Chance Pe Dance	"Pe... Pe... Pepein...." (Duet)	Pritam	Neeraj Shridhar, Master Saleem, Hard Kaur
2010	Paathshala	"Mujhe Teri"	Hanif Sheikh	Hanif Sheikh, Akansha Lama
2010	Paathshala	"Mujhe Teri" (Remix)	Hanif Sheikh	Hanif Sheikh, Akansha Lama
2010	Once Upon A Time in Mumbaai	"Tum Jo Aaye Zindagi Mein"	Pritam	Rahat Fateh Ali Khan
2010	Once Upon A Time in Mumbaai	"Pee Loon" (Female)	Pritam	Solo
2010	Once Upon A Time in Mumbaai	"I Am in Love" (Female)	Pritam	Solo
2010	Aashayein	"Dilkash Dildaar Duniya"	Pritam	Shaan
2010	Kajraare		Himesh Reshammiya	
2010	Action Replayy	"Luk Chup Jaana"	Pritam	KK
2010	A Flat	"Dil Kashi"	Bappi Lahiri	Sonu Nigam, Raja Hasan, Aditi Singh Sharma
2011	Ready	"Humko Pyar Hua"	Pritam	KK, Pritam
2011	Ready	"Meri Ada Bhi (Ishq Ne Mere)"	Pritam	Rahat Fateh Ali Khan
2011	Yaara o Dildaara	"Balle Balle Shawa Shawa"	Nitin Kumar Gupta/Jaidev Kumar	
2012	Bittoo Boss	"Kick Lag Gayi"	Raghav Sachar	
2012	Dangerous Ishq	"Tu Hi Rab Tu Hi Dua"	Himesh Reshammiya	Rahat Fateh Ali Khan
2012	Dabangg 2	"Saanson Ne "	Sajid–Wajid	Sonu Nigam
2012	Dil Tainu Karda Ae Pyar	"Thodi Der Pehlan "	Javinder Kumar	Arvinder Kumar
2013	Aashiqui 2	"Hum Mar Jayenge"	Jeet Gannguli	Arijit Singh
2013	Aashiqui 2	"Piya Aaye Na"	Jeet Gannguli	KK
2013	Nautanki Saala	"Mera Mann Kehne Laga" (Female)	Falak Shabir	Solo
2013	Zilla Ghaziabad	"Tu Hai Rab Mera"	Amjad Nadeem	Mohit Chauhan
2013	Dubai	"Mere Yaara"		Arijit Singh
2013	Canada Nights	"Sab Vaade"		KK
2013	I Love New Year	"Aao Na"	Pritam	Sonu Nigam
2013	I Love New Year	"Halki Halki"	Pritam	Shaan
2014	Yaariyan	"Mujhe Ishq Se"	Mithoon	Gajendra Verma
2014	Bindaas	"Tomake Chere Ami"	Habib Wahid	
2014	You Are My Shining Star	"Tera Mera Pyar Sanam" (Reprise)		Neeraj Shridhar
2014	You Are My Shining Star	"Judaiyaan" (Reprise)		Taimur Shahid
2014	You Are My Shining Star	"Humein Tumse Pyar Kitna" (Female)		
2014	Singham Returns	"Kuch Toh Hua Hai"	Ankit Tiwari	
2014	Creature 3D	"Naam-E-Wafa"	Mithoon	Farhan Saeed
2015	Roy	"Tu Hai Ki Nahi" (Unplugged)	Ankit Tiwari	Solo
2015	Ek Paheli Leela	"Tere Bin Nahi Laage" (Female Version)	Uzair Jaswal (Recreated by Amaal Mallik)	Aishwarya Majmudar, Alamgir Khan
2015	Ek Paheli Leela	"Saiyaan Superstar"	Amaal Mallik	Solo
2015	Binary Domain	"Mere Khuda"		
2015	Bloodstorm	"Jaage Ab Raat Bhar"		
2015	All Is Well	"Mere Humsafar (Remake)"	Mithoon	
2016	Game Over	"Tumhein Hum Pyar"		
2016	Mill Gaye Heer Ranjha	"Dil Yeh Mera"		
2016	Mill Gaye Heer Ranjha	"Ishq Ho Jaaye"		Pranav Vatsa
2016	Airlift	"Soch Na Sake (Remake)"	Amaal Mallik	Amaal Mallik, Arijit Singh
2016	Sanam Re	"Sanam Re (Lounge Mix)"	Mithoon	
2016	Sarbjit	"Salamat"	Amaal Mallik	Arijit Singh
2016	Isteqamat (Pakistani Movie)	"Radhe Shyam"		Shani Arshad, Neeraj Shridhar
2016	Junooniyat	"Nachenge Saari Raat (Remake)"	Meet Bros	Neeraj Shridhar
2016	Junooniyat	"Ishqe Di Lat Tadpave"	Ankit Tiwari	
2016	Wajah Tum Ho	"Dil Ke Paas (Remake)"	Kalyanji-Anandji (Recreated by Abhijit Vaghani)	Arijit Singh, Neuman Pinto
2016	Wajah Tum Ho	"Dil Ke Pass" (Reprise)	Kalyanji-Anandji (Recreated by Abhijit Vaghani)	Armaan Malik
2016	Wajah Tum Ho	"Dil Ke Pass" (Indian Version)	Kalyanji-Anandji (Recreated by Abhijit Vaghani)	Arijit Singh
2016	Wajah Tum Ho	"Dil Mein Chupa Lunga (Remake)"	Meet Bros	Meet Bros, Armaan Malik
2016	Wajah Tum Ho	"Wajah Tum Ho"	Mithoon	Mithoon, Altamash Faridi
2016	Wajah Tum Ho	"Wajah Tum Ho" (Long Version)	Mithoon	Mithoon, Altamash Faridi
2016	Tum Bin II	"Dekh Lena"	Ankit Tiwari	Arijit Singh
2016	Tum Bin II	"Dekh Lena" (Unplugged)	Ankit Tiwari	Solo
2016	Team (Pakistani Movie)	"Tum Ho"		Altamash Faridi, Shiraz Uppal
2017	Mera Highway Star	"Mera Highway Star" (Single)	Sanjay Rajee	Raftaar
2017	Noor	"Gulabi Aankhe 2.0 (Remake)"	Amaal Mallik	Yash Narvekar, Amaal Mallik
2017	Ik Yaad Purani	"A Single"	Jashan Singh	
2017	Mubarakan	"The Goggle Song"	Amaal Mallik	Armaan Malik, Sonu Nigam
2017	Baadshaho	"Mere Rashke Qamar (Remake) - Version 2"	Nusrat Fateh Ali Khan, Tanishk Bagchi	Solo
2018	Raat Kamal Hai	"Raat Kamal Hai" (Single)	Guru Randhawa	
2018	Satyamev Jayate	"Paaniyon Sa"	Rochak Kohli	Atif Aslam
2018	Satyamev Jayate	"Tere Jaisa"	Arko	
2018	Meet-Tera Yaar Hoon Main (cover)	"Meet-Tera Yaar Hoon Main" Single		Solo
2018	Paniyo Sa Chill Mix	"Paniyo Sa Chill Mix"	Sourav Roy, Rochak Kohli	
2019	Why Cheat India	"Dil Mein Ho Tum (Remake)"	Rochak Kohli	Solo
2019	Luka Chuppi	"Tu Laung Main Elaachi (Remake)"	Tanishk Bagchi	Solo
2019	Kabir Singh	"Tera Ban Jaunga"	Akhil Sachdeva	Akhil Sachdeva
2019	Kabir Singh	"Tera Ban Jaungi"	Akhil Sachdeva	
2019	Khandaani Shafakhana	"Sheher Ki Ladki (Remake)"	Anand–Milind (Recreated by Tanishk Bagchi)	Badshah
2019	Khandaani Shafakhana	"Dil Jaaniye"	Payal Dev	Jubin Nautiyal
2019	Batla House	"O Saki Saki (Remake)"	Vishal–Shekhar (Recreated by Tanishk Bagchi)	Neha Kakkar, B Praak
2019	Saaho	"Enni Soni"	Guru Randhawa	Guru Randhawa
2019	Saaho	"Ye Chota Nuvvunna"	Guru Randhawa	Haricharan
2019	Marjaavaan	"Haiya Ho (Remake)"	Tanishk Bagchi	Jubin Nautiyal
2019	Marjaavaan	"Thodi Jagah (Female)"	Tanishk Bagchi	
2019	The Body	"Aaina"	Arko Pravo Mukherjee	Arko Pravo Mukherjee, Neha Kakkar
2019	Pati Patni Aur Woh	"Aakhiyon Se Goli Maare (Remake)"	Tanishk Bagchi	Mika Singh
2020	Street Dancer 3D	"Lagdi Lahore (Remake)"	Sachin–Jigar, Guru Randhawa	Guru Randhawa
2020	Baaghi 3	"Dus Bahane 2.0 (Remake)"	Vishal–Shekhar	KK, Shaan, Vishal–Shekhar
2021	Koi Jaane Na	''Koi Jaane Na'' (Title Track)	Amaal Malik	Armaan Malik, Amaal Malik
2022	Bhool Bhulaiyaa 2	"Hum Nashe Mein Toh Nahin"	Pritam	Arijit Singh
2022	Bhool Bhulaiyaa 2	"Hum Nashe Mein Toh Nahin - Lofi Revibed"	Pritam	
2022	Dhokha: Round D Corner	"Mahi Mera Dil"	Tanishk Bagchi	Arijit Singh
2022	Nazar Andaaz	"Sukoon"(Female Version)	Vishal Mishra	
2023	Satyaprem Ki Katha	"Aaj Ke Baad"	Manan Bhardwaj	
2023	Satyaprem Ki Katha	"Pasoori Nu"	Rochak Kohli, Ali Sethi	Arijit Singh
2023	Starfish	"Kya Humne Socha Tha"	OAFF	OAFF, Nikhil D'Souza
2023	Starfish	"Yaad Ban Gaye"	Manan Bhardwaj	
2024	Srikanth	"Tu Mil Gaya"	Tanishk Bagchi	Jubin Nautiyal
2024	Ghudchadi	"Dil Vasda"	Tanishk Bagchi	Raghav Chaitanya
2024	Ghudchadi	"Punjabi Munde"	Sukhbir, DJ Chetas-Lijo George	Yash Narvekar, Sukhbir, Priyani Vani Pandit
2025	Metro... In Dino	"Aur Mohabbat Kitni Karoon (Reprise)"	Pritam	
2026	Border 2	"Pyaari Lage"	Vishal Mishra	

=== Albums / Singles ===
Year	Album(s)/Single(s)	Song	Co-Singer(s)	Music	Lyrics	Note
2009	Love Ho Jaye	"Radhe Shyam"	Neeraj Shridhar	Monty Sharma	Sameer	Debut Album
2009	Love Ho Jaye	"Jis Dil Ko Ishq Ho Jaye"		Monty Sharma	Sameer	Debut Album
2009	Love Ho Jaye	"Rabba Maula"		Monty Sharma	Sameer	Debut Album
2009	Love Ho Jaye	"Mere Khuda"		Monty Sharma	Sameer	Debut Album
2009	Love Ho Jaye	"Jaage Ab Raat Bhar"		Monty Sharma	Sameer	Debut Album
2009	Love Ho Jaye	"Tumhe Hum Pyaar Na Karte To"		Monty Sharma	Sameer	Debut Album
2009	Love Ho Jaye	"Woh Raatein"		Monty Sharma	Sameer	Debut Album
2009	Love Ho Jaye	"Kudi Punjaaban"		Monty Sharma	Sameer	Debut Album
2009	Love Ho Jaye	"Aaja Mahi"	Neeraj Shridhar	Monty Sharma	Sameer	Debut Album
2009	Love Ho Jaye	"Jis Dil Ko Ishq Ho Jaye (Remix)"		Monty Sharma	Sameer	Debut Album
2009	Love Ho Jaye	"Radhe Shyam (Remix by DJ A-Myth)"		Monty Sharma	Sameer	Debut Album
2009	Love Ho Jaye	"Raba Maula (Remix)"		Monty Sharma	Sameer	Debut Album
2009	Love Ho Jaye	"Aaja Mahi (Remix)"	Neeraj Shridhar	Monty Sharma	Sameer	Debut Album
2009	Love Ho Jaye	"Aaj Ki Sham (Lounge Mix)"		Monty Sharma	Sameer	Debut Album
2015	Mainu Ishq Da Lagya Rog	"Mainu Ishq Da Lagya Rog"		Arko		
2015	All of Me (Baarish)	"All of Me (Baarish)"	Arjun	Mithoon, Arjun		
2016	Mere Papa	"Mere Papa"		Jeet Gannguli	Manoj Muntashir	
2017	Ik Yaad Purani	"Ik Yaad Purani"	Jashan Singh	Shaarib-Toshi	Kumaar	
2017	Mera Highway Star	"Mera Highway Star"	Raftaar	Sanjay Rajee	Raftaar, Khushali Kumar, Mohan Singh	
2018	Raat Kamal Hai	"Raat Kamal Hai"	Guru Randhawa			
2019	Nai Jaana	"Nai Jaana"	Sachet Tandon	Tanishk Bagchi	Nirmaan	
2020	Masakali 2.0	"Masakali 2.0"	Sachet Tandon	Tanishk Bagchi (Original by A.R. Rahman)	Prasoon Joshi (Additional Lyrics by Tanishk Bagchi	
2020	Tere Naal	"Tere Naal"	Darshan Raval	Darshan Raval	Gautam Sharma and Gurpreet Saini	
2020	Zara Thehro	"Zara Thehro"	Armaan Malik	Amaal Malik	Rashmi Virag	
2020	Naam	"Naam"	Millind Gaba	Millind Gaba	Jaani	
2020	Tanhaai	''Tanhaai''	N/A	Sachet–Parampara	Sayeed Quadri	
2020	T-Series Acoustics	"Phir Na Milen Kabhi" (Reprise)		Ankit Tiwari	Prince Dubey	from Malang
2021	Pehle Pyaar Ka Pehla Gham	''Pehle Pyaar Ka Pehla Gham''	Jubin Nautiyal	Manan Bharadwaj	Javed Akhtar [Additional Lyrics: Rashmi Virag]	
2021	Main Jis Din Bhulaa Du	''Main Jis Din Bhulaa Du''	Jubin Nautiyal	Rochak Kohli	Manoj Muntashir	
2021	Is Qadar	''Is Qadar''	Darshan Raval	Sachet–Parampara	Sayeed Quadri	
2021	Tera Naam	"Tera Naam"	Darshan Raval	Manan Bhardwaj		
2022	Tumse Pyaar Karke	"Tumse Pyaar Karke"	Jubin Nautiyal	Payal Dev	Kunaal Vermaa	
2024	Dil Kuch Hor Ni Mangda	"Dil Kuch Hor Ni Mangda"	Sanjoy	Rooh Sandhu, Ikka	Ikka	
2025	Vekhan Nu	"Vekhan Nu"	Akshay & IP	IP Singh, traditional	IP Singh	
2025	Fitrat	"Fitrat"	Kaifi Khalil		Kaifi Khalil, Ali Zaryoun	
2025	Shartaan	"Shartaan"	Abhijeet Srivastava	Shayra Apoorva		
2026	Nikki Nikki Gal	"Nikki Nikki Gal"	Sakshi Ratti		Aparshakti Khurana	

== Awards ==
Year	Awards	Songs/Album	Category
2010	Global Indian Music Academy Awards	Love Ho Jaaye	Best Music Debut Non-Film Album
2011	Global Indian Music Academy Awards	"Tum Jo Aaye"	MTV Hotpick, most requested and played song on MTV
2011	Global Indian Film & TV Honor	"Tum Jo Aaye"	Upcoming Music Talent
2014	Mirchi Music Awards	Aashiqui 2	Best Album of the Year
2014	Mirchi Music Awards	Aashiqui 2	Listeners Choice Album of the Year
2016	Global Indian Music Academy Awards	"Soch Na Sake"	Award for Best Duet
2017	Mirchi Music Awards	"Soch Na Sake"	Listener's Choice Song of the Year
2017	IIFA Awards	"Soch Na Sake"	Best Female Playback Singer
2020	Mirchi Music Awards	Tera Ban Jaaunga	Best Album to name a few
