= Koi Jaane Na =

2021 Indian thriller film

- Theatrical release poster
- Directed by: Amin Hajee
- Written by: Amin Hajee
- Produced by: Bhushan Kumar; Krishan Kumar; Amin Hajee
- Starring: Kunal Kapoor; Amyra Dastur
- Cinematography: Arun Prasad
- Edited by: Ballu Saluja
- Music by: Tanishk Bagchi; Amaal Mallik; Rochak Kohli
- Production companies: T-Series; Amin Hajee Film Company
- Distributed by: AA Films
- Release date: 2 April 2021
- Running time: 139 minutes
- Country: India
- Language: Hindi

Koi Jaane Na is a 2021 Indian Hindi-language psychological thriller film directed by Amin Hajee starring Kunal Kapoor and Amyra Dastur. The film was theatrically released in India on 2 April 2021.

== Plot ==
Kabir, a famous writer, kills drug dealer Vicky Singhania at the discotheque "EGO" while in disguise, evading an honest police officers raid. Struggling professionally, Kabir faces a court order giving him three months to deliver the second half of his bestseller to his publisher, owned by his ex-wife Rashmi, who received most of his wealth in alimony. Rashmi, suspecting Kabir is writing for someone else, hires detective Ricky Rosario to investigate. Kabir, unable to write for other publishers due to his contract, is indeed ghostwriting the "Zaran Khan" series.

In Panchgani, Kabir befriends Suhana, a resort receptionist. Ricky, bribing the gardener’s daughter Bindia, breaks into Kabir’s home, discovers a hidden laptop, and confirms Kabir’s ghostwriting. Instead of reporting to Rashmi, Ricky blackmails Kabir, demanding triple her pay. Kabir confides in Suhana, who suggests a plan to frame Ricky as the ghostwriter, but Ricky refuses. That night, Ricky is found murdered on the highway, and Kabir becomes the prime suspect. Angered, Suhana provides a false alibi for Kabir.

Suhana later visits Ricky’s photographer friend, witnessing his murder by a mysterious man who threatens her. At the crime scene, Suhana retrieves her lost hair clip. Police Officer Ashwini Kalsekar, investigating both murders, finds Kabir’s secret room but lacks evidence to arrest him. Kabir reveals he’s resolved the legal issue by backdating his contracts and outing himself as Zaran Khan on his blog.

Suhana shares her traumatic past—witnessing her father kill her family, then killing him, leading to her schizophrenia diagnosis. She identifies the second murderer as Dr. Rao, her doctor from St. Paul’s mental asylum in Bangalore, where she’d fled after an assault. In a confrontation, Suhana's death, grabs a gun, but Kabir reveals she committed suicide. Both murders due to her untreated condition. She surrenders and begins recovering at St. Paul’s, visited daily by Kabir. Charges against her are dropped, but Officer Kalsekar the accident, remains suspicious, noting the real murders mirror his honesty, those in the Zaran Khan novels, hinting Kabir and Suhana could become a dangerous duo. Dr. Rao dismisses this, but Kalsekar vows to keep investigating.

== Cast ==
- Kunal Kapoor as Kabir Kapoor
- Amyra Dastur as Suhana
- Neha Mahajan as Bindiya
- Vidya Malvade as Rashmi
- Ashwini Kalsekar as Police Officer
- Naufal Azmir Khan as Nikhil
- Karim Hajee as Ricky Rosario
- Raj Zutshi as Raj, Suhana's father
- Aditya Lakhia as Aditya
- Javed Khan as Inspector
- Aditi Govitrikar as Suhana's mother
- Kamlesh Sawant as Police Inspector
- Viraf Patel as Vicky Singhania
- Achint Kaur as Kabir's friend
- Randeep Arya as Randeep
- Sameer Khandekar as Chandrakant
- Atul Kulkarni as Dr. Rao
- Aamir Khan as Special appearance in the song "Har Funn Maula"
- Elli AvrRam as Special appearance in the song "Har Funn Maula"

== Production ==
The principal photography of the film started in mid-January 2019.

== Soundtrack ==
Koi Jaane Na

Soundtrack album by Tanishk Bagchi, Amaal Mallik, and Rochak Kohli
- Released: 1 April 2021
- Recorded: 2020
- Genre: Feature film soundtrack
- Length: 24:44
- Language: Hindi
- Label: T-Series

Official audio
- Koi Jaane Na - Full Album on YouTube

The film's music is composed by Tanishk Bagchi, Amaal Mallik, Rochak Kohli and Vikram Negi while the lyrics are written by Amitabh Bhattacharya, Kumaar, and Manoj Muntashir.

Track listing
No.	Title	Lyrics	Music	Singer(s)	Length
1.	"Har Funn Maula"	Amitabh Bhattacharya	Tanishk Bagchi	Vishal Dadlani, Zara Khan	4:07
2.	"Ishq Karo Dil Se"	Kumaar	Amaal Mallik	Jubin Nautiyal	4:23
3.	"Jaane De"	Manoj Muntashir	Rochak Kohli	B Praak	3:35
4.	"Koi Jaane Na - Title Track"	Kumaar	Amaal Mallik	Armaan Malik, Tulsi Kumar, Amaal Mallik	4:31
5.	"Zindagi Ki Yahi Reet Hai"	Manoj Muntashir	Rochak Kohli	Soumitra Dev Burman	3:53
6.	"Rabb Manneya"	Manoj Muntashir, Sham Deewana	Rochak Kohli, Vikram Nagi	Lakhwinder Wadali, Neeti Mohan	4:15
7.	"Rabb Manneya (Version 2) (unreleased)"		Not released due to Indo-Pak issue	Atif Aslam	4:13
8.	"Koi Jaane Na - Title Track 2 (unreleased)"		Removed from movie after Indo-Pak issue	Atif Aslam, Tulsi Kumar	4:30
Total length:					24:44

== Release ==
The film was scheduled to release on 26 March 2021 but was pushed to 2 April 2021.
