= Bengal 1947 =

- First Look Poster
- Directed by: Akashaditya Lama
- Written by: Akashaditya Lama
- Produced by: Rishabh Pande; Satish Pande
- Starring: Devoleena Bhattacharjee; Aditya Lakhia; Sohaila Kapur; Ankur Armam
- Cinematography: Vinod Chhabra
- Edited by: Rajendra Mahapatra
- Music by: Abhishek Ray
- Production companies: Comfed Productions; Think Tank Global
- Distributed by: Platoon One Films
- Release date: 29 March 2024 (India)
- Country: India
- Language: Hindi

Bengal 1947: An Untold Love Story is a 2024 Hindi-language romantic drama film written and directed by Akashaditya Lama and produced by Satish Pande and Rishabh Pande under the banner of Comfed Productions and Think Tank Global. The distribution was handled by Platoon One Films. The film features Devoleena Bhattacharjee, Aditya Lakhia, Sohaila Kapur, and Ankur Armam as lead characters.

The background score music was composed by Abhishek Ray, while Vinod Chhabra and Rajendra Mahapatra handled the cinematography and editing. Bengal 1947 was theatrically released on 29 March 2024.

== Cast ==
- Devoleena Bhattacharjee
- Aditya Lakhia
- Sohaila Kapur
- Ankur Armam
- Omkar Das Manikpuri
- Anil Rastogi
- Pramod Pawar
- Surabhi Srivastava
- Falaq Rahi
- Vikram TDR
- Atul Gangwar
- Vevek Upadyay
- Yogendra Choubey
- Rajesh Bonik
- Harish Bhimani

== Release ==
Bengal 1947 was theatrically released on 29 March 2024.

== Reception ==
Abhishek Srivastava of The Times of India rated this film 2.5 stars out of 5 stars and noted "This real-incident-inspired-fictional-drama makes a sincere effort but ultimately lacks depth."

Times Now rated this film 3 stars out of 5 stars and noted "At its core, Bengal 1947 aspires to more than mere storytelling; it aims to provoke reflection and introspection. By intricately weaving together historical events with compelling character arcs, the film offers audiences a window into the past while illuminating timeless themes of love, resilience, and the human spirit."
