= Ashok Banthia =

Indian actor and director

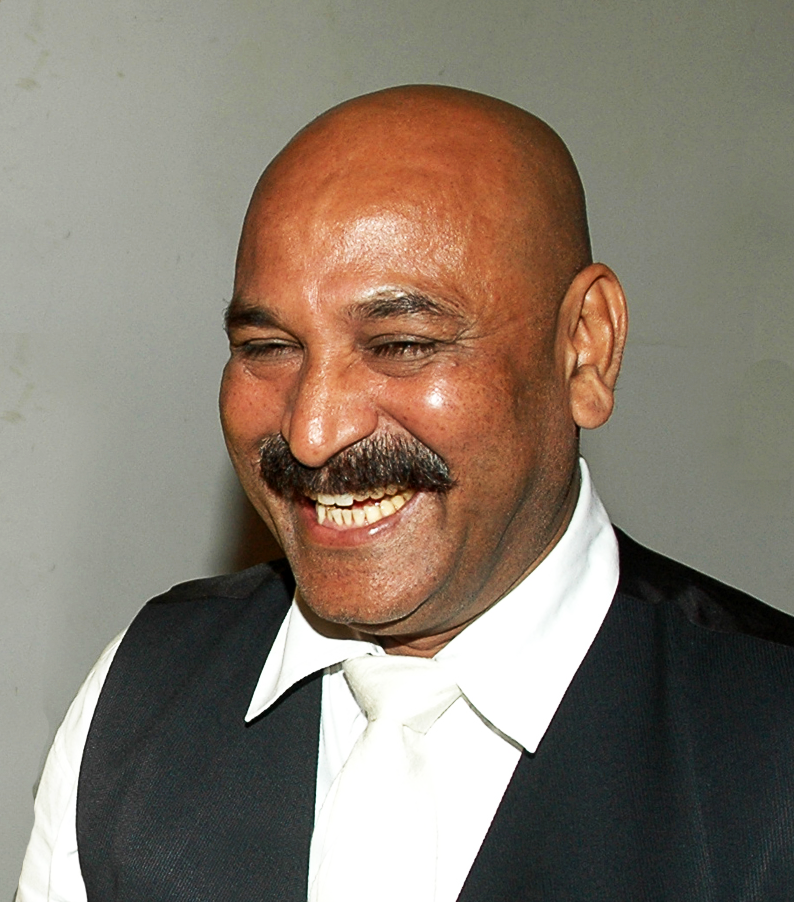
- Banthia in 2013
- Occupations: Actor; Director
- Years active: 1983–present

Ashok Banthia, sometimes referred as Ashok Bathia or Ashok Bhatia, is an Indian actor and director associated with Hindi film, television and theatre actor. He is a NSD (National School of Drama) alumnus known for his roles in Australian TV miniseries Bodyline as Nawab of Pataudi Sr.

== Career ==
As he finished his courses at NSD, he received an offer to work with Kennedy Miller's serial Bodyline, where he played the role of Indian cricketer Nawab of Pataudi Sr. He also did a role in Peter Morhan's English film The Peacock Spring, the French film Indian Orchid, and Hindi films. He recently has appeared in a film Atrangi Re.

== Filmography (incomplete) ==
Year	Film	Role	Other notes
1983	Jaane Bhi Do Yaaro	News reporter	
1985	Nasoor		
1989	Nocturne Indien (French)	The taxi driver from the hospital	(as Ashok Bantia)
1993	Bedardi	Police inspector	
1993	Rudaali		(as Ashok Bantia)
1995	Dushmani: A Violent Love Story		(as Ashok Bantiya)
1996	The Peacock Spring (TV movie)	Ram Chand	
2000	Bawandar		
2000	Mission Kashmir	Shrafat	(as Ashok Bhantia)
2002	Aankhen		(as Ashok Bhantia)
2002	Kali Salwar	Khuda Baksh	
2004	Chot- Aj Isko, Kal Tereko		(as Ashok Bantia)
2004	Loknayak	Ram Manohar Lohia	
2005	7 1/2 Phere: More Than a Wedding		(as Ashok Bhantia)
2008	Ramayan (2008 TV series)	Vishwamitra	
2010	Chase	Vishwajeet Rana – Udyog Mantri	(as Ashok Bhantia)
2012	Arjun: The Warrior Prince	Bhim	
2012	Rush	Raja Choudhary	
2012	Cigarette Ki Tarah	Nikhil Dabur's Father	
2013	Maazii	Satbeer Chacha	
2014	Khoobsurat	Ram Sevak	
2017	Julie 2	Jeweller Aggarwal	

Ashok Bantia also played in Mahabharata as Maharaj Chitravat and Kritaverma.

== Television (incomplete) ==
Year	Title	Character	Aired On
1984	Bodyline (miniseries)	Nawab of Pataudi Sr.	
1989	Mahabharat (1988 TV series)	Kritvarma	Doordarshan
1990	Chanakya	"Mahamantri" Indra Dutt	Doordarshan
1997	Ek Kahani Aur Mili		Doordarshan
2004	Tahreer Munshi Premchand ki (Nirmala)		Doordarshan
2007	Kesariya Balam Aavo Hamare Des	Mamaji	Sahara One
2008	Ramayan (2008 TV series)	Vishwamitra	NDTV Imagine
2008	Balika Vadhu	Village Head of Bilaria	Colors
2012	Ramayan (2012 TV Series)		Zee TV
2012	Devon Ke Dev...Mahadev	Himalayraj's minister	Life OK

Zabaan sambhalke as maharaj of Kyoto [doordarshan]

== Theatre ==
Year	Play	Role	Other notes
2005	Chanakya	Maha Amatya (Prime Minister)	
2011	Mohenjo-daro		
2008	Chanakyashashtra	Mr. Rammurty	
2000	The Last Train		

== Other credits ==
Year	Project	Role	Other notes
1993	Tamas	Associate Director	
