= Sohaila Kapur =

Indian actress and playwright

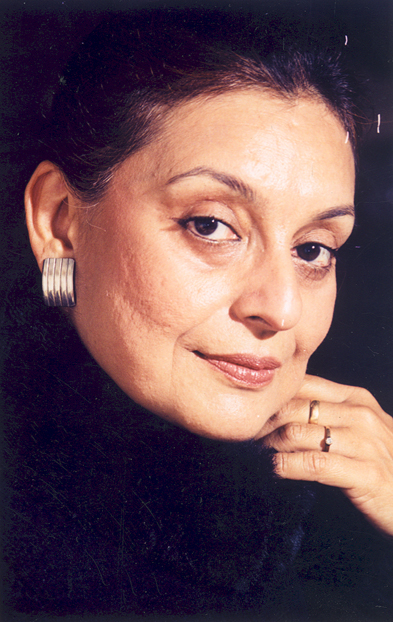
- Born: Mumbai, Maharashtra, India
- Education: Delhi University
- Occupations: Actress; playwright; theatre director; journalist; television personality
- Years active: 1980–present
- Spouses: Anirudh Limaye (divorced); Anil Charnalia (died; 1999)
- Relatives: Dev Anand (uncle) Shekhar Kapur (brother)
- Family: See Anand-Sahni family

Sohaila Kapur is an Indian actress, journalist, television personality, theatre director and playwright.

== Early life ==
Sohaila was born in a Punjabi Hindu family to Kulbhushan Kapur and Sheel Kanta Kapur. Her father was the physician to Fakhruddin Ali Ahmed, former President of India.

The niece of famous Indian actor Dev Anand. Her mother, Sheel Kanta Kapur was the sister of Chetan, Dev and Vijay Anand. She is the third and the youngest sister of Indian filmmaker Shekhar Kapur.

She graduated from Delhi University.

== Career ==
After working with Times of India for like ten years as a journalist. She then devoted herself to free lance writing. She has written over hundred articles for magazines and newspapers. In 1983, she also authored a book on Indian esoteric rites, called Witchcraft in Western India.

She has also anchored shows for channels like Doordarshan and Omni Television. She is also engaged as an anchor-journalist for Lok Sabha TV.

As a playwright, she had written several plays. In 2002, she directed her first play a musical called Yeh Hai Mumbai Meri Jaan. It was premiered at the Traverse Theatre at Edinburgh.

She also directed the play titled Rumi: Unveil the Sun, which got critical and popular acclaim. The play was nominated as one of the best plays produced in the country and best play director at the Mahindra Excellence in Theatre Awards in 2008 at New Delhi.

She has also played a role in Banegi Apni Baat telecasted on Doordarshan in the 90s.

== Personal life ==
Sohaila first married Anirudh Limaye, but the marriage ended in divorce. Then she married Ontario based Chartered Accountant Anil Charnalia.

On 23 October 1999, her husband Anil Charnalia died during an airplane flight from a massive heart attack. A big lawsuit was filed against the airlines due to negligence.

== Bibliography ==
- Witchcraft in Western India. Orient Longman. 1983. ISBN 0861314026.

== Acting credits ==
=== Films ===
Year	Title	Role	Notes
1991	Rukmavati Ki Haveli		
2009	Cooking with Stella	Aunty Kamla	Canadian film
2015	Phantom	Ameena Bai	
2016	Dev Bhoomi	Maya	
2018	Daas Dev	Sushila Devi	
2018	Circus	House Owner	Short film
2019	Satellite Shankar	Shankar's mother	
2020	Dolly Kitty Aur Woh Chamakte Sitare	Damyanti Rai	
2021	Bawri Chhori	Nani	
2021	Silence... Can You Hear It?	Mrs. Chaudhary	Zee5 film
2021	Tadap	Cafe Lady	
2024	Chote Nawab	Sakeena Bai	
2024	Bengal 1947		

=== Television ===
Year	Title	Role	Notes
1989	Bharat Ek Khoj	Roshan Ara, Janki Devi, Nafisa, Madanika	Played various roles
2019–2021	The Family Man	School principal	
2020	Special OPS	Sujata Thapar	
2020–2022	Bhaukaal	Mausi	
2020–2024	Aarya	Rajeshwari Rathore	
