= Bhushan Kumar =

Chairman and managing director of T-Series

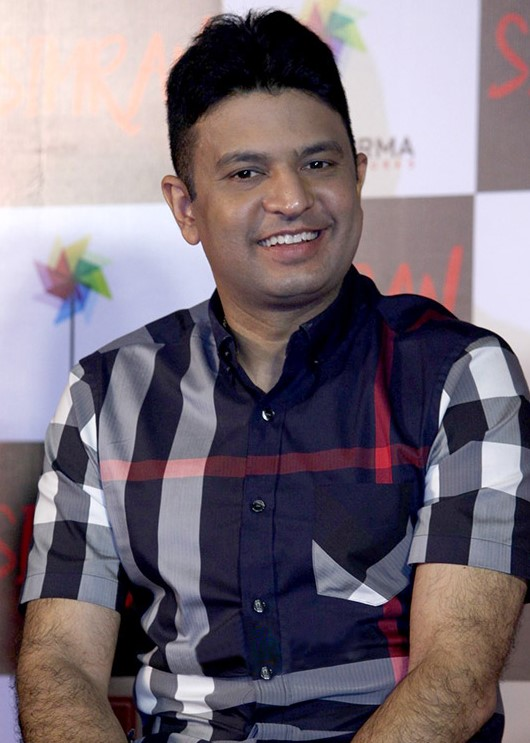
- Kumar in 2018
- Born: 27 November 1977 (age 48); Delhi, India
- Occupations: Film producer; Music producer
- Years active: 1996–present
- Title: Chairman and Managing Director of T-Series
- Spouse: Divya Khosla Kumar (m. 2005)
- Children: 1
- Father: Gulshan Kumar
- Relatives: Krishan Kumar (uncle); Tulsi Kumar (sister); Khushalii Kumar (sister)
- Family: Kumar family

Bhushan Kumar Dua (born 27 November 1977) is an Indian film producer and music producer. He is the chairman and managing director of Super Cassettes Industries Limited, also known as T-Series. He is known for his work in Bollywood.

On the Hurun India Rich List 2022, he and his family were ranked as the 175th richest Indian with a net worth of ₹10,000 crores (around US$1.2 billion).

== Career ==
Kumar took control of the music company T-Series in 1997, along with his uncle Krishan Kumar, after the murder of his father, Gulshan Kumar. He went on to become the chairman and managing director of the company.

=== Film producer ===
In 2013, Kumar produced Nautanki Saala. The same year, Bushan Kumar released a remake of Aashiqui, Aashiqui 2.

T-Series has worked with directors such as Madhur Bhandarkar, and Milan Luthria.

On 3 April 2017, Kumar signed a contract with Akshay Kumar for the film Mogul, which is an official biopic based on the life of his father. However, Akshay Kumar quit the film and Aamir Khan agreed to do the part, only to quit and return later.

== Personal life ==
Bhushan Kumar was born in a Punjabi family in Delhi to the founder of T-Series, owner Gulshan Kumar and his wife Sudesh Kumari Dua. Kumar married Divya Khosla on 13 February 2005 at the Maa Vaishno Devi shrine in Katra. They have a son born in October 2011.

== Controversies ==
In June 2018, Bhushan Kumar was accused of sexual harassment by Marina Kuwar.

In December 2018, Kumar was accused by the Income Tax Department of evading taxes and of moving hundreds of crores to foreign countries to purchase properties using benami means.

== Filmography ==
Year	Film	Producer	Notes	Ref.
2001	Tum Bin	Yes		
2002	Jee Aayan Nu	Yes	Punjabi film	
2003	Aapko Pehle Bhi Kahin Dekha Hai	Yes		
2004	Muskaan	Yes		
2005	Lucky: No Time for Love	Yes		
2006	Humko Deewana Kar Gaye	Yes		
2007	Darling	Yes		
2007	Bhool Bhulaiyaa	Yes		
2008	Karzzzz	Yes		
2009	8 x 10 Tasveer	Yes		
2010	Aashayein	Yes		
2010	Kajraare	Yes		
2010	Tees Maar Khan	No	Special appearance in the song "Happy Ending"	
2011	Patiala House	Yes		
2011	Ready	Yes		
2011	Yaara o Dildaara	Yes		
2013	Nautanki Saala	Yes		
2013	Aashiqui 2	Yes		
2013	A New Love Ishtory	Yes		
2014	Yaariyan	Yes		
2014	Bhoothnath Returns	Yes		
2014	Hate Story 2	Yes		
2014	Creature 3D	Yes		
2015	Baby	Yes		
2015	Roy	Yes		
2015	Ek Paheli Leela	Yes		
2015	All Is Well	Yes		
2015	I Love New Year	Yes		
2015	Bhaag Johny	Yes		
2015	Hate Story 3	Yes		
2016	Airlift	Yes		
2016	Sanam Re	Yes		
2016	Sarbjit	Yes		
2016	Junooniyat	Yes		
2016	Raaz: Reboot	Yes		
2016	Tum Bin II	Yes		
2016	Wajah Tum Ho	Yes		
2017	Noor	Yes		
2017	Hindi Medium	Yes		
2017	Raabta	Yes		
2017	Baadshaho	Yes		
2017	Simran	Yes		
2017	Chef	Yes		
2017	Tumhari Sulu	Yes		
2018	Sonu Ke Titu Ki Sweety	Yes		
2018	Hate Story 4	Yes		
2018	Raid	Yes		
2018	Blackmail	Yes		
2018	Fanney Khan	Yes		
2018	Satyameva Jayate	Yes		
2018	Batti Gul Meter Chalu	Yes		
2019	Cabaret	Yes	ZEE5 release	
2019	Why Cheat India	Yes		
2019	De De Pyaar De	Yes		
2019	Bharat	Yes		
2019	Kabir Singh	Yes		
2019	Malaal	Yes		
2019	Arjun Patiala	Yes		
2019	Khandaani Shafakhana	Yes		
2019	Singham	Yes	Punjabi film	
2019	Batla House	Yes		
2019	Saaho	Yes	Telugu-Hindi bilingual film	
2019	Daaka	Yes	Punjabi film	
2019	Satellite Shankar	Yes		
2019	Marjaavaan	Yes		
2019	Pagalpanti	Yes		
2019	Pati Patni Aur Woh	Yes		
2020	Tanhaji	Yes		
2020	Jai Mummy Di	Yes		
2020	Street Dancer 3D	Yes		
2020	Malang	Yes		
2020	Shubh Mangal Zyada Saavdhan	Yes		
2020	Thappad	Yes		
2020	Ludo	Yes	Netflix release	
2020	Chhalaang	Yes	Amazon Prime Video release	
2020	Durgamati	Yes	Amazon Prime Video release	
2020	Indoo Ki Jawani	Yes		
2021	Madam Chief Minister	Yes		
2021	Tuesdays And Fridays	Yes		
2021	Mumbai Saga	Yes		
2021	Saina	Yes		
2021	Koi Jaane Na	Yes		
2021	Sardar Ka Grandson	Yes	Netflix release	
2021	Sherni	Yes	Amazon Prime Video release	
2021	Haseen Dillruba	Yes	Netflix release	
2021	Bhuj: The Pride of India	Yes	Hotstar release	
2021	Shiddat	Yes	Hotstar release	
2021	Dybbuk	Yes	Amazon Prime Video release	
2021	Satyameva Jayate 2	Yes		
2021	Chhorii	Yes	Amazon Prime Video release	
2021	Chandigarh Kare Aashiqui	Yes		
2021	Atrangi Re	Yes	Hotstar release	
2022	Jhund	Yes		
2022	Toolsidas Junior	Yes		
2022	Radhe Shyam	Yes	Telugu-Hindi bilingual film	
2022	Jalsa	Yes	Amazon Prime Video release	
2022	Hurdang	Yes		
2022	Bhool Bhulaiyaa 2	Yes		
2022	Anek	Yes		
2022	Sherdil: The Pilibhit Saga	Yes		
2022	Hit: The First Case	Yes		
2022	Ek Villain Returns	Yes		
2022	Dhokha: Round D Corner	Yes		
2022	Vikram Vedha	Yes		
2022	Nazar Andaaz	Yes		
2022	Code Name: Tiranga	Yes		
2022	Thank God	Yes		
2022	Honeymoon	Yes	Punjabi film	
2022	Tara Vs Bilal	Yes		
2022	Double XL	Yes		
2022	Thai Massage	Yes		
2022	Drishyam 2	Yes		
2022	Mister Mummy	Yes		
2022	An Action Hero	Yes		
2022	Cirkus	Yes		
2023	Kuttey	Yes		
2023	Faraaz	Yes		
2023	Shehzada	Yes		
2023	Tu Jhoothi Main Makkaar	Yes		
2023	Bholaa	Yes	Co-produced with Ajay Devgn, Krishan Kumar, S. R. Prakashbabu, S. R. Prabhu	
2023	Gumraah	Yes		
2023	Adipurush	Yes	Hindi-Telugu bilingual film	
2023	Sukhee	Yes		
2023	Yaariyan 2	Yes		
2023	Starfish	Yes		
2023	Animal	Yes		
2024	Srikanth	Yes		
2024	Savi	Yes		
2024	Phir Aayi Hasseen Dillruba	Yes		
2024	Ghudchadi	Yes		
2024	Khel Khel Mein	Yes		
2024	Vicky Vidya Ka Woh Wala Video	Yes		
2024	Bhool Bhulaiyaa 3	Yes		
2025	The Diplomat	Yes		
2025	Raid 2	Yes		
2025	Metro... In Dino	Yes		
2025	De De Pyaar De 2	Yes	Co-produced with Krishan Kumar, Luv Ranjan, Ankur Garg	
2025	Tere Ishk Mein	Yes		
2026	Border 2	Yes		
2026	Assi	Yes		
2026	Dhamaal 4	Yes		
2026	Untitled Anurag Basu film †	Yes		
TBA	Spirit †	Yes	Filming; multilingual film	

== Awards and nominations ==
=== Filmfare Awards ===
Year	Category	Work	Result	Ref.
2018	Best Film	Hindi Medium	Won	
2021	Best Film	Thappad	Won	
2021	Best Film	Tanhaji	Nominated	
2021	Best Film	Ludo	Nominated	
2023	Best Film	Bhool Bhulaiyaa 2	Nominated	
2024	Best Film	Animal	Nominated	
2025	Best Film	Bhool Bhulaiyaa 3	Nominated	
