= Ghudchadi =

2024 Hindi film by Binoy Gandhi

- Official release poster
- Directed by: Binoy Gandhi
- Written by: Deepak Kapur Bhardwaj
- Produced by: Bhushan Kumar; Krishan Kumar; Nidhi Dutta; Binoy Gandhi
- Starring: Aruna Irani; Sanjay Dutt; Raveena Tandon; Parth Samthaan; Khushalii Kumar
- Cinematography: Yogesh Jani
- Edited by: Mitesh Soni
- Music by: Sukhbir; Tanishk Bagchi; Lijo George-DJ Chetas
- Production companies: T-Series Films; Keep Dreaming Pictures
- Distributed by: JioCinema
- Release date: 9 August 2024
- Running time: 119 minutes
- Country: India
- Language: Hindi

Ghudchadi (transl. Horse Riding) is a 2024 Indian Hindi-language romantic comedy film directed by Binoy Gandhi and written by Deepak Kapur Bhardwaj. Produced by Nidhi Dutta, Binoy Gandhi, Bhushan Kumar and Krishan Kumar under the banner of Keep Dreaming Pictures and T-Series. A remake of the blockbuster Bengali film Projapati (2022), it stars Sanjay Dutt and Raveena Tandon with Parth Samthaan, Khushalii Kumar and Aruna Irani in pivotal roles.The film was premiered on JioCinema on 9 August 2024.

== Plot ==
A middle-class father-son duo from Delhi in which a son-loving father doesn't want his son to get married with the love of his life and a father-loving son doesn't want his 60-year-old father to get married.

== Cast ==
- Sanjay Dutt as Veer Sharma
- Raveena Tandon as Menaka
- Parth Samthaan as Chirag Sharma
- Khushalii Kumar as Devika
- Aruna Irani as Kalyani Devi Sharma
- Ansha Sayed as Sneh Sharma
- Aakash Dabhade as Mayank
- Achint Kaur as Sunita
- Surendra Rajan as Kaka
- Riney Aryaa as Bride
- Alika Nair as Alisha
- Neeraj Sood as Dr. Bhatia
- Navni Parihar as Bua
- Naresh Gosain as Fufa
- Prem Saxena as Nitin Waiter
- Santosh Rai as Garland Guy
- Yogesh Garg as Office Boy
- Anju Rajiv as Kamini
- Sumit Singh as Richa

== Production ==
The film was announced in mid-February 2022.

Principal photography began on 23 August 2023. Filming took place in Gurugram, New Delhi and Jaipur. Filming ended in November 2023.

== Music ==
Ghudchadi

Soundtrack album by Sukhbir, Tanishk Bagchi and Lijo George-DJ Chetas
- Released: 8 August 2024
- Recorded: 2023–24
- Genre: Feature film soundtrack
- Length: 9:57
- Language: Hindi
- Label: T-Series

Official audio
- Ghudchadi (Audio Jukebox) on YouTube

The music for the movie was composed by Sukhbir, Tanishk Bagchi & Lijo George-DJ Chetas. The first single titled "Punjabi Munde" was released on 30 July 2024. The second single "Dil Vasda" was released on 6 August 2024.

No.	Title	Lyrics	Music	Singer(s)	Length
1.	"Punjabi Munde"	Sukhbir, Lijo George, Yash Narvekar	Sukhbir, Lijo George-DJ Chetas	Sukhbir, Tulsi Kumar, Yash Narvekar, Priyani Vani	3:17
2.	"Dil Vasda"	Tanishk Bagchi	Tanishk Bagchi	Raghav Chaitanya, Tulsi Kumar	3:05
3.	"Rote Rote"	Kumaar	Tanishk Bagchi	Jubin Nautiyal	3:49
Total length:					9:57

== Reception ==
Sukanya Verma of Rediff.com awarded the film 1.5 stars out of five. Nirali Kanabar of OTT Play awarded the film 2/5 stars. Dhaval Roy of The Times of India gave the film 2.5 stars out of five. Sushmita Dey of Times Now rated the film 3/5 stars.
