= Starfish (2023 film) =

Indian Hindi language romantic drama film

- Theatrical release poster
- Directed by: Akhilesh Jaiswal
- Screenplay by: Akhilesh Jaiswal; Aditya Bhatnagar
- Based on: Starfish Pickle by Bina Nayak
- Produced by: Bhushan Kumar; Krishan Kumar
- Starring: Khushalii Kumar; Milind Soman; Ehan Bhat; Tushar Khanna
- Cinematography: Jim Edgar
- Edited by: Manan Sagar
- Music by: Songs: OAFF–Savera; Khaalif–Yo Yo Honey Singh; Manan Bhardwaj; Sachet–Parampara; Score: Amar Mohile
- Production company: T-Series Films
- Distributed by: AA Films
- Release date: 24 November 2023
- Running time: 119 minutes
- Country: India
- Language: Hindi
- Box office: ₹0.10 crore

Starfish is an Indian Hindi language romantic drama film directed by Akhilesh Jaiswal. Produced by Bhushan Kumar under T-Series Productions, the film stars Khushalii Kumar, Milind Soman, Ehan Bhat, Vidya Malvade and Tusharr Khanna.

The film was theatrically released on 24 November 2023.

== Synopsis ==
Starfish follows an extraordinary diver who works in a dredging company but is haunted by incidents from her past. Tara Salgaonkar is an expert diver who works for Martin's dredging company. She is often seen getting affected by certain past events. These episodes seem to be in bits and pieces which traumatise her and Tara is on a mission to find answers of some unanswered questions. When she does meet her mother Sukanya's friend, Daksh Ajit Singh, she is shocked to learn something about her mom who had died by suicide. Will she be able to confront her enigmatic past and unearth truths that she is not ready to accept?

== Cast ==
- Khushalii Kumar as Tara Salgaonkar
- Milind Soman as Arlo
- Ehan Bhat as Neil
- Tushar Khanna as Aman Sharma
- Pawan Shankar as Martin
- Vidya Malvade as Sukanya Salgaonkar
- Jagat Singh Rawat as Tara’s father
- Leslie Fernandes as Daksh Ajit Singh
- Nikhat Khan as Tara’s grandmother
- Sambhav Jain as Kabir
- Baby Adiba Hussain as Young Tara
- Luciano Ellul as David
- Peter McLean as Jax
- Catalin Bindu as Henry

== Music ==
Starfish

Soundtrack album by OAFF–Savera, Khaalif–Yo Yo Honey Singh, Manan Bhardwaj and Sachet–Parampara
- Released: 22 November 2023
- Recorded: 2022–23
- Genre: Feature film soundtrack
- Length: 24:09
- Language: Hindi
- Label: T-Series

The song Kudiye Ni Tere remake of the 2011 Punjabi song Brown Rang by Yo Yo Honey Singh.

Track listing
No.	Title	Lyrics	Music	Singer(s)	Length
1.	"Fanaa Kar Lo"	Ankur Tewari	OAFF–Savera	Arijit Singh	3:09
2.	"Kudiye Ni Tere"	Yo Yo Honey Singh, Mellow D	Khaalif–Yo Yo Honey Singh	Yo Yo Honey Singh, Harjot Kaur	4:09
3.	"Madhaniyan"	Manan Bhardwaj	Manan Bhardwaj	Manan Bhardwaj	3:35
4.	"Kya Humne Socha Tha"	Medha Sahi	OAFF	OAFF, Nikhil D'Souza, Tulsi Kumar	3:10
5.	"Hold On"	OAFF, Savera	OAFF–Savera	OAFF, Savera, Lothika	2:59
6.	"Bairaage"	Kumaar	Sachet–Parampara	Sachet Tandon, Parampara Tandon	3:32
7.	"Yaad Ban Gaye"	Manan Bhardwaj	Manan Bhradwaj	Tulsi Kumar & Manan Bhardwaj	3:35
Total length:					24:09

== Reception ==
Samarth Goyal of Hindustan Times wrote,"Akhilesh Jaiswal's Starfish, an adaptation of Bina Nayak's acclaimed novel Starfish Pickle, attempts to explore the depths of human emotions but unfortunately, the cinematic voyage encounters turbulent waters due to a choppy narrative, impulsive editing, and a screenplay that feels lethargic at best." Vinamra Mathur of Firstpost gave the film 2.5 out of 5, writing, "Starfish is a mixed bag. The restrain in the storytelling has mostly been done to give the film a brooding mood, but it needed more moments of liveliness and spirit. It needed as much depth as the sea it shows, and as much spark as the name of the central character. But only for the beautiful and breathtaking locales and the severely underrated and underutilized Milind Soman, the film almost manages to sail through. Hallelujah it didn't drown."

== Release ==
=== Theatrical ===
The film was theatrically released on 24 November 2023.

=== Home media ===
The film was digitally released on Netflix on 19 January 2024.
