= Dhokha: Round D Corner =

2022 film directed by Kookie Gulati

- Theatrical Release Poster
- Directed by: Kookie Gulati
- Screenplay by: Kookie Gulati; Neeraj Singh
- Story by: Kookie Gulati
- Produced by: Bhushan Kumar; Krishan Kumar; Dharmendra Sharma; Vikrant Sharma
- Starring: R. Madhavan; Khushalii Kumar; Aparshakti Khurana; Darshan Kumar
- Cinematography: Amit Roy
- Edited by: Dharmendra Sharma
- Music by: Amar Mohile
- Production company: T-Series Films
- Distributed by: AA Films
- Release date: 23 September 2022
- Running time: 112 minutes
- Country: India
- Language: Hindi
- Budget: ₹15 crore
- Box office: ₹3.74 crore

Dhokha: Round D Corner is a 2022 Indian Hindi-language romantic psychological thriller film directed by Kookie Gulati and produced by Bhushan Kumar under T-Series. It stars R. Madhavan, Khushalii Kumar, Aparshakti Khurana and Darshan Kumar. The film marks the acting debut of Khushalii Kumar.

== Plot ==
Saanchi and Yathaarth are a married couple. However, their marriage is on the brink of collapse. Saanchi keeps pressuring Yathaarth to speak with his divorce lawyer, and plans to move to the United Kingdom. One day, Yathaarth sees the news, at work that Haq Riyaz Gul, a terrorist, has entered his apartment when Saanchi was alone. Baffled, he rushes to the apartment complex, only to find that the Mumbai Police is already present. ACP Harishchandra Malik tries to negotiate with Gul, but in vain. Meanwhile, the media, who are present outside the apartment complex, receive news about the hostage situation and try to sensationalize it. Yathaarth informs Malik that Saanchi was recently diagnosed with delusional disorder, and that as time goes on, she can become more dangerous than Gul if she does not take her prescribed pills.

Meanwhile, in the apartment, Saanchi calmly tells Gul that Yaatharth is trying to give her the wrong medication to make her lose her sanity. She also tells him that once Yaatharth succeeds with his plan, he can keep her wealth as a caretaker, whilst also continuing his relationship with her psychiatrist, Vidya, whom she caught multiple times when they were being sketchy around her. Furious and annoyed about the situation, Gul tells Saanchi to stay silent. When Malik contacts Gul, Yaatharth pleads with Gul, to give Saanchi her medication. Otherwise, she will soon have a relapse. Overhearing the conversation between Yaatharth and Gul, Saanchi asks Gul to not administer it, while flirting with him.

Gul vulnerably tells Sanchi that he did not know about the bomb he delivered to the boy's hostel, which eventually killed 13 people. He states that he was betrayed by his uncle from Kashmir in delivering the bomb instead of an actual courier, which killed 13 students. Since all the evidence pointed toward him, he was convicted. Later, Gul threatens Malik, with killing Saanchi, if his demands are not met. When Yaatharth insists on going to his apartment, alone, with Malik and the police, they both get into a heated argument regarding the next course of action.

In the apartment, as Saanchi seduces Gul, they plan to make Saanchi a fake hostage, to escape from the police's clutches. As they act on their plan, Saanchi alerts the police on his gun's magazine being empty, betraying Gul's trust, in front of the police. However, Gul manages to bring Saanchi back to the apartment. Saanchi soon starts behaving differently, asking about Gul's identity and how he managed to get into the apartment. Vexed, Gul ties Saanchi to a chair in the living room. It is revealed that Gul actually gave Saanchi her pills through the chai she made earlier.

After some time, Saanchi tries to initiate sex with Gul, but he gets second thoughts, while being intimate with her. Saanchi then proceeds to tell Gul that all men are the same: Yaatharth, Gul, and 'him'. Gul has a change of heart again, and disposes of her pills, stating that he plans to run away with her. Meanwhile, Malik and Yaatharth decide on Yaatharth getting the ransom money of INR 50 lakhs, so that they can arrest Gul and defuse the situation quickly. When Yaatharth goes up to his apartment, with the ransom money, multiple shots are heard. Malik and the police rush to the apartment, only to find Saanchi dead, in the arms of Yaatharth, with the shots fired at her. Gul proclaims to the police that Yaatharth shot and killed her, instead of him.

At the court, Yaatharth states that once he entered the apartment, Saanchi immediately asked for Yaatharth's help. Gul fired multiple shots at her, killing her, when she betrayed him, again. As per Gul's testimony, when Yaatharth entered the apartment, both Saanchi and him verbally abused each other. Yaatharth then tried to take the gun from Gul, but they both got into a tussle. However, Yaatharth managed to fire multiple shots at Saanchi, even when the gun was in Gul's hands. Malik states to the court that when Gul was in his custody, he came to know that he was actually delusional and hands in the medical and psychological reports, as evidence, proving the same. The court maintains the earlier death sentence of Gul's, with Saanchi being added to his list of victims. However, since he has been diagnosed with a mental illness, the death sentence can only be carried out once he has been cured of it.

It is later revealed that Yaatharth did give the wrong medication to Saanchi, with the help of Vidya, with whom he was having an affair. The third person Saanchi referred to Gul, was actually Malik, with whom she was planning to flee, to the United Kingdom, from Yaatharth. But, when Malik insisted on staying in India, as he has a family, Saanchi blackmailed Malik, of falsely raping her. It was Malik who along with Gul planned his escape during a jail transfer in order to kill Sanchi in her apartment. In return, Malik promised to save him from a death sentence. Gul, having killed nobody, later loses his sanity and is sent to a mental institution for treatment, where he imagines Saanchi. This means that Yatharth deceived Sanchi and Gul was deceived by both Sanchi and Malik. Thus, each character gives ‘Dhokha’ to each other.

== Cast ==
- R. Madhavan as Yaatharth Sinha
- Khushalii Kumar as Saanchi Sinha
- Aparshakti Khurana as Haq Riyaz Gul
- Darshan Kumar as ACP Harishchandra Malik
- Sharad Jadhav as Inspector Sawant
- Girish Sharma as Mumbai-360 Editor
- Santosh Patil as Baapat
- Ajay Chakroborty as Home Secretary
- Vikram Sahu as Judge

== Production ==
In July 2019, T Series announced that Khushali Kumar would make her acting debut in a project titled Dahi Cheeni directed by debutant filmmaker Ashween Neal Mani, and featuring R. Madhavan in a further leading role. However, the project was stalled after the first draft did not materialise as expected, and prompted T Series to launch a new film with the same cast.

== Music ==
Dhokha: Round D Corner

Soundtrack album by Tanishk Bagchi, Bappi Lahri and Gourav Dasgupta
- Released: 5 October 2022
- Recorded: 2022
- Genre: Feature film soundtrack
- Length: 11:25
- Language: Hindi
- Label: T-Series
- Producer: Bhushan Kumar

The music for the film is composed by Tanishk Bagchi, Bappi Lahiri and Gourov Dasgupta. The background score is composed by Amar Mohile. The lyrics are penned by Kumaar, Anjaan and Devshi Khanduri.

The first song "Mere Dil Gaaye Ja (Zooby Zooby)" song was a remake of the film Dance Dance's "Zooby Zooby" performed by Alisha Chinai with Bappi Lahiri as composer and Anjaan as lyricist. Kohinoor Mukherjee worked as a mixing and mastering engineer for the song "Tu Banke Hawa".

No.	Title	Lyrics	Music	Singer(s)	Length
1.	"Mere Dil Gaaye Ja (Zooby Zooby)"	Kumaar, Anjaan	Tanishk Bagchi, Bappi Lahri	Zahrah S Khan, Yash Narvekar	3:37
2.	"Tu Banke Hawa"	Devshi Khanduri	Gourov Dasgupta	Jubin Nautiyal	4:48
3.	"Mahi Mera Dil"	Kumaar	Tanishk Bagchi	Arijit Singh, Tulsi Kumar	3:01
Total length:					11:25

== Reception ==
Dhaval Roy of The Times of India rated the film 2.5 out of 5 stars and wrote "You may enjoy the movie for its performances, but if suspense thrillers are your jam, you may feel deceived". Grace Cyril of India Today rated the film 2.5 out of 5 stars and wrote "Selling scripts like these as top-notch thrillers starring superstars is the biggest dhokha with the audience! The highlight of the movie is just the climax. If suspense thrillers are your thing, give it a go. Also for Aparshakti and Khushalii's performances". Deepa Gahlot of Rediff rated the film 2 out of 5 stars and wrote "At no point in Dhoka: Round D Corner does the tension build up as it goes quickly from thriller to unintentional comedy".
