= Cigarette Ki Tarah =

- Movie poster
- Directed by: Akashaditya Lama
- Written by: Kamlesh Kumar
- Produced by: Sunita Poddar, Branda Yadav
- Starring: Bhoop Yaduvanshi; Prashant Narayanan; Madhurima Tuli; Sudesh Berry; Ashok Banthia
- Cinematography: Ramesh Krishna
- Release date: 14 December 2012
- Running time: 107 minutes
- Country: India
- Language: Hindi

Cigarette ki tarah Ki Tarah (transl. Like a cigarette) is a 2012 Indian Hindi-language romantic thriller film directed by Akashaditya Lama, featuring Bhoop Yaduvanshi, Prashant Narayanan, Madhurima Tuli and Sudesh Berry. The film was produced under the banner of P. Y. Films Pvt. Ltd. While the music was composed by Sudeep Banerjee, Kavita Seth, Ankur Mishra and Viraj Sawant, the lyrics have been written by Ajay Jhingran, Kaushal Kishore and Dev Shukla. Vivek Yadav and Longines Fernandes were the choreographers.

A dispute between the director and producers over the film's editing led to a lawsuit in the Mumbai High Court, and eventually to what the director called a "compromise" and an "edited version that did not meet my creative vision".

== Plot ==
A guy falls in love with a young, beautiful girl. This blind love leads him into deep trouble and further separates him from other people, like one man versus the entire world. In these dark situations, where one surely gives up on everything, he doesn't. He keeps on believing and trusting in his blind love, which eventually shows him all the ways to get out of trouble.

== Cast ==
- Bhoop Yaduvanshi as Nikhil Dabur
- Prashant Narayanan as Rajesh Fogat
- Madhurima Tuli as Jessica
- Sudesh Berry as Danny D'Gama
- Ashok Banthia as Nikhil Dabur's Father
- Monika Singh as Prostitute Girl
- RajKumar as Ajay Nikhil's Friend
- Deepraj Rana as Corrupt Police Inspector

== Soundtrack ==
The music is composed by Sudeep Banerjee, Kavita Seth, Ankur Mishra and Viraj Sawant whereas the lyrics of it are written down by Ajay Jhingran, Kaushal Kishore, Dev Shukla and Sudarshan Goel. The songs are sung by Tochi Raina, Nikhil D'Souza, Kavita Seth, Shweta Pandit, Suzanne D'Mello and Sudeep Banerjee.

Track listing
| No. | Title | Artist(s) | Length |
|---|---|---|---|
| 1. | "Dooriyan" | Nikhil D'Souza | 04:30 |
| 2. | "Hey Bhagwan" | Tochi Raina | 04:01 |
| 3. | "Mujhko Khud Se" | Kavita Seth | 03:40 |
| 4. | "Cigarette Ki Tarah" | Suzanne D'Mello | 04:12 |
| 5. | "Ye Bata Do Piya" | Sudeep Banerjee, Shweta Pandit | 05:14 |
| 6. | "Dooriyan (Remix)" | Nikhil D'Souza | 05:14 |

== Reception ==
Critic Ankur Pathak of Rediff.com panned the film, giving it no stars and calling it a "half-heartedly created music video, which tries to convince itself that it is an actual film". Shakti Shetty of Mid-Day said, "There are bad films and then there are films that shouldn't have been made in the first place. Cigarette Ki Tarah effortlessly falls into the latter category."
