= Shiv Mahima =

1992 Indian Hindu Religious film

- Directed by: Shantilal Soni
- Written by: Bhring Toopkari
- Produced by: Gulshan Kumar
- Starring: Arun Govil; Kiran Juneja
- Music by: Arun Paudwal
- Release date: 10 June 1992 (India)
- Country: India
- Language: Hindi

Shiv Mahima is a 1992 Indian mythological movie produced by Gulshan Kumar under the banner of Super Cassettes Industries Ltd. It was directed by Shantilal Soni and written by Bhring Toopkari, and stars Arun Govil and Reshma Singh. The musics was composed by Arun Paudwal. The story is based on an ardent devotee of Lord Shiva who faces many difficulties in life but is saved by Lord Shiva every time.

== Cast ==
- Arun Govil as Shiv ji
- Kiran Juneja as Parvati Mata
- Gajendra Chauhan as Bhakt Shivdas
- Reshma Singh
- Kewal Shah as Somdev
- Barkha Pandit
- Gulshan Kumar as Bhaktraj

== Songs ==
- There were 11 Shiv Bhajans in the film, sung by Hariharan (singer) and Anuradha Paudwal. The music was composed by Arun Paudwal.

	Song	Lyricist	Singer
1	Hey Shambhu Baba Mere Bholenath	Shyam Raj	Hariharan
2	Hey Bhole Shankar Padharo	Balbir Nirdosh	Hariharan
3	Subah Subah Le Shiv Ka Naam Kar Le Bande Ye Shubh Kaam	Nandlal Pathak	Hariharan
4	Chal Kanwariya Chal Kanwariya	Sachchidanand Mishra	Hariharan
5	Milta Hai Sachcha Sukh Kewal Shivji Tumhare Charno Mein	Traditional	Anuradha Paudwal
6	Jyotirling Ka Dhyan Karo	Nandlal Pathak	Anuradha Paudwal, Hariharan
7	Saare Gaon Se Doodh Manga Kar Pindi Ko Nehla Do	Prof. J.K. Setpal	Anuradha Paudwal
8	Shivnath Teri Mahima Jab Teen Lok Gayen	Naqsh Layalpuri	Anuradha Paudwal
9	Main To Shiv Ki Pujarin Banugi	Qamar Jalalabadi	Anuradha Paudwal
10	Prabhu Mere Man Ko Bana De Shivala	Mahendra Dehlvi	Hariharan
11	Shiv Shankar Beda Paar Karo	Mahendra Dehlvi	Hariharan

All Songs Videos:

https://www.youtube.com/watch?v=mBUu5lKwtJg&t=2409s

शिव महिमा, Shiv Mahima I Hindi Movie Songs I HARIHARAN, ANURADHA PAUDWAL

Movie Link:

https://www.youtube.com/watch?v=0ni7rBN_hTs

Shiv Mahima I Full Hindi Movie I GULSHAN KUMAR I ARUN GOVIL I KIRAN JUNEJA I T-Series Bhakti Sagar
