= Jazim Sharma =

Indian ghazal singer (born 1990)

Jaspreet 'Jazim' Sharma (born on 14 September 1990 in Bathinda, Punjab, India) is an Indian ghazal singer. He is national level gold-medalist in Thumri and Ghazal. He has been inspired by the ghazal singer Ghulam Ali Khan.

He started singing at the age of 5 and learnt singing from Guru Vijay Sachdeva. After graduating in Music, he moved to Mumbai to do his M.A. in Music from Mumbai University.

== Career ==
He started his Bollywood career in 2014 by singing the song "Kya Hoga", along with Master Saleem, Shahid Mallya, and Jamal Akbar, in the Hindi film Dedh Ishqiya.

In 2020, he composed the song "Guzar Jayega" which was a collaboration between 50 singers during the first wave of the coronavirus pandemic.

== Singles ==
Year	Track	Artist(s)	Notes
2022	Aish	Jazim Sharma	
2021	Ishq	Jazim Sharma and Ruma Sharma	
2021	Bismillah 2	Jazim Sharma feat Kanwar Grewal	
2021	Kahaan Aake Rukne the Raaste	Jazim sharma	
2020	Satnam da Chakar Firaya	Jazim Sharma Ft. Satvinder Singh - Harvinder Singh	
2020	Berang	Jazim Sharma	
2020	Tasavvur	Gyatri Asokan and Jazim Sharma	

== Movie Tracks ==
Year	Track	Movie name	Artist(s)	Directors	Composers	Lyricist
2014	Kya Hoga	Dedh Ishqiya	Jazim Sharma, Master Saleem, Shahid Mallya	Abhishek Chaubey	Vishal Bharadwaj	Gulzar
2016	Zarre Zarre Mein Noor Bhara	Jugni	Jazim Sharma, Rahat Fateh Ali Khan	Shefali Bhushan	Clinton Cerejo	Shellee
2018	Chonch Ladhiyaan	Manmarziyaan	Jazim Sharma, Harshdeep Kaur	Anurag Kashyap	Amit Trivedi	Shellee
2018	Grey Walaa Shade	Manmarziyaan	Jazim Sharma, Harshdeep Kaur	Anurag Kashyap	Amit Trivedi	Shellee
2018	Raat Jashan Di	Raja Abroadiya	Feroz Khan	Lakhwinder Shabla	Jazim Sharma	Davy Shawla
2019	Channa	Gun Pe Done	Jazim Sharma, Chinmayi Sripada	Abhik Bhanu	Rimi Dhar	Saaveri Verma
2019	Shah-E-Makhdum Ali Vali	Kaagar	Jazim Sharma, Amaan Khan	Makarand Mane	Av Prafullachandra	Jay Atre
2022	Ke Hove Se Pyaar	Haryana	Jazim Sharma	Sandeep Baswana	Mohit Pathak	Sandeep Baswana
2023	Gila Karna	Safed	Jazim Sharma	Sandeep Singh	Jazim Sharma	Mohan Jutley
2023	Masti	Mansooba	Jazim Sharma	Rana Ranbir	Hey Manni	Rana Ranbir

== Indie Pop Songs ==
Song title	Artist	Lyrics	Label	Song Language
Bismillah 2	Jazim Sharma, Kanwar Grewal	Manpreet Tiwana	Snow Records	Punjabi
Gullak	Jazim Sharma, Simran Hora	Durgesh Singh	The Viral Fever	Hindi
Rooh Lai Gya	Jazim Sharma, Farah Anwar	S.M. Sadiq	Jazim Productions	Punjabi
Main Jee Raha	Jazim Sharma, Shilpa Rao	Shloke Lal	Sony Music	Hindi
Mahiya	Jazim Sharma	Ameeta Parsuram	Asli Music	Hindi
Tere Binn	Jazim Sharma	Saaveri Verma	Times Music	Hindi
Bismillah Karaan	Jazim Sharma	Traditional	Times Music	Punjabi
Akhaan Ohdiyaan	Jazim Sharma	Kumaar	Zee Music Company	Punjabi
Dholan Maahi	Jazim Sharma	Sawtanter Dev Arif	T-Series	Punjabi
Guzar Jayega	Jazim Sharma, Amitab Bachchan +49 Artist	Siddhant Kaushal	Ampliify Times	Hindi
Phir Hoga	Jazim Sharma, Kavita Krishnamurti, Shaan, Jaspinder Narula, Jabir Jassi, Shashaa Tirupatti, Mehtab Virk, Simran Choudhary, Mitika Kanwar	Sidhhant Kaushal	They See Records	Hindi - Punjabi
Intezaar	Jazim Sharma	Saaveri Verma	Zee Music Company	Hindi
Tu Shamil	Jazim Sharma, Himani Kapoor	Saaveri Verma	Jazim Productions	Hindi
Chann	Jazim Sharma, Sireesha Bhagwatula	Mahimma Bhardwaj	Jazim Productions	Hindi
Shiksha Na Ruke	Sonu Nigam	Saaveri Verma	Smile Foundation	Hindi
Mere Saah	Jazim Sharma, Mitika Kanwar	Vinder Nathumajra	Jazim Productions	Punjabi - English
Dil De Taar	Jazim Sharma, Ruby Khan	Iqbal Choudhary & Mahimma Bhardwaj	Jazim Productions	Hindi - Punjabi
Garjat Aayi Re	Jazim Sharma, Kumar Sharma	Traditional	Jazim Productions	Hindi
Naina	Jazim Sharma	Manu Chauhan	Ampliify Times	Hindi - Punjabi
The Separation	Jazim Sharma	S.M Sadiq	Ampliify Times	Punjabi
Har Roz Da Ladna	Jazim Sharma		Jazim Productions	Punjabi - English
Bismillah Karaan (Electro Version)	Jazim Sharma	Traditional	Times Music	Punjabi
Mela	Jazim Sharma	Surjit Patar	Jazim Productions	Punjabi
Kya Kahein	Jazim Sharma, Sangeeta Khanna	Saaveri Verma	Times Music	Hindi
Yaadon Ki Gullak	Jazim Sharma	Durgesh Singh	The Viral Fever	Hindi
Umbilical	Jazim Sharma	Alok Ranjan Srivastava	Tvf Music	Hindi
True Love	Jazim Sharma	Vinder Nathumajra	Odd Even Music	Punjabi
Mujhe Pyar Hua Hai	Jazim Sharma	Parthiv Haryanvi	Tlcmy Music	Hindi
Ishqa	Jazim Sharma	Mahimma Bhardwaj		Hindi - Punjabi
Diwana Hua	Jazim Sharma	Parthiv Haryanvi	Tlcmy Music	Hindi
Langh Aaja	Jazim Sharma	Traditional	Jazim Productions	Punjabi
Kisliye	Jazim Sharma	Ravi Basnet	Ziyaan Music	Hindi
Tu agar	Jazim Sharma	Pulaestya	Manu Rajeev Music	Hindi
Loye Loye	Jazim Sharma, Saloni Thakkar		Jazim Productions	Punjabi
Khamoshiyan	Jazim Sharma	Mahimma Bhardwaj	Mahiimma Bhardwaj	Hindi
Thapki Dedo Maa	Jazim Sharma	Shekharr Srivastav	Creative Satisfaction	Hindi
