= Gulshan Kumar =

Indian film and music producer and businessman (1956–1997)

- Kumar in 1995
- Born: Gulshan Kumar Dua; 5 May 1956; Delhi, India
- Died: 12 August 1997 (aged 41); Mumbai, Maharashtra, India
- Cause of death: Murder
- Education: Deshbandhu College; Delhi University
- Occupations: Businessperson; film producer; music producer
- Years active: 1972–1997
- Organisation: T-Series
- Known for: Founding T-Series
- Spouse: Sudesh Kumari (m. 1975)
- Children: Bhushan Kumar (son); Tulsi Kumar (daughter); Khushalii Kumar (daughter)
- Relatives: Krishan Kumar (brother); Tanya Singh (sister-in-law); Divya Khosla Kumar (daughter-in-law)
- Family: Kumar family

Gulshan Kumar Dua (5 May 1956 – 12 August 1997), was an Indian film and music producer and businessman who was the founder of the Super Cassettes Industries Private Limited music label in the Bollywood industry. After founding T-Series in 1983, Dua established it as a leading record label in the 1990s.

After his death, T-Series has since been run by his younger brother Krishan Kumar and son Bhushan Kumar. His daughters, Tulsi Kumar and Khushalii Kumar, are a playback singer and an actress respectively.

== Biography ==
Born on 5 May 1956 in a Punjabi Hindu family, Gulshan Kumar Dua was the son of a fruit juice vendor who worked the streets of the Daryaganj neighbourhood in the heart of Delhi. His family came as refugees from the Jhang region of West Punjab after the communal riots during the partition of India in 1947. Dua started working with his father from an early age. Gulshan Kumar was a devoted worshipper of Shiva and especially Vaishno Devi. He sung many religious and traditional songs in favour of almost all major deities in Hinduism. Due to traditional faith, love and respect towards Vaishno Devi, he ran a free of cost meal assistance service in which free meals are offered as prasad to all the devotees visiting Vaishno Devi Temple. It was first started in 1983 at Baan Ganga location which is situated in between of the Vaishno Devi Temple's pilgrimage. Even after his demise in 1997, the service still continues till today and is widely revered all across India. His son Bhushan Kumar now manages the service.

Dua changed career paths when his family acquired a shop selling records and inexpensive audio cassettes, which foreshadowed the onset of a vast music empire.

== Music business and film career ==
Gulshan Kumar started his own audio cassette operation known as "Super Cassettes Industries," which turned in to a profitable business. He began a music production company in Noida. As his business started growing, he moved to Mumbai.

His first movie in Bollywood was Lal Dupatta Malmal Ka in 1989. Next was the big hit Aashiqui in 1990 which is remembered for its music by Nadeem–Shravan. His other movies included Bahaar Aane Tak, Dil Hai Ke Manta Nahin, Ayee Milan Ki Raat, Meera Ka Mohan, Jeena Marna Tere Sang and Bewafa Sanam.

=== T-Series music label ===
T-Series emerged as one of the top music labels in India with the release of Aashiqui in 1990. In the early 1990s T-Series was largely responsible for sparking a boom for the Indian music industry. With its music and film production, the annual earnings of T-Series grew from ₹20 crore ($16 million) in 1985 to ₹200 crore ($88 million) in 1991, and by the time of Gulshan Kumar's death in 1997, had reached ₹500 crore ($140 million).

It continues to be a major label. and controls more than 60% share of the Indian music market. In international market, T-Series enjoys a turnover in excess of $4.2 million, and exports to 24 countries across six continents. In India, it has the largest distribution network of over 2500 dealers.

== Filmography ==
Year	Film	Credited as	
Year	Film	Director	Producer
1989	Lal Dupatta Malmal Ka	No	Yes
1990	Appu Raja	No	Yes
1990	Aashiqui	No	Yes
1990	Bahaar Aane Tak	No	Yes
1991	Ayee Milan Ki Raat	No	Yes
1991	Jeena Teri Gali Mein	No	Yes
1991	Dil Hai Ke Manta Nahin	No	Yes
1992	Meera Ka Mohan	No	Yes
1992	Jeena Marna Tere Sang	No	Yes
1992	Sangeet	No	Yes
1993	Shabnam	No	Yes
1993	Aaja Meri Jaan	No	Yes
1993	Kasam Teri Kasam	No	Yes
1995	Bewafa Sanam	Yes	Yes
1995	Suryaputra Shanidev	No	Yes
1995	Satyanarayan Ki Virat Katha	No	Yes
1997	Char Dham	No	Yes

== Murder ==
Gulshan Kumar was killed on 12 August 1997, in a shooting outside a Shiva temple which he attended daily in Jeet Nagar, Andheri West suburb of Mumbai. He was shot 18 times.

On the day of the assassination, his bodyguard, provided by the Government of Uttar Pradesh, was sick. Although he had received two threatening calls, on 5 and 8 August 1997, Kumar refused to pay the extortion money. The hired killers, including Rauf and Abdul Rashid, conducted reconnaissance for a month, but did not proceed because of the armed bodyguard. At 10:40, while returning from the temple, he was confronted by one of the assassins who said: "Bahut puja kar li, ab upar ja ke karna" (Hindi: बहुत पूजा कर ली, अब ऊपर जाके करना, romanized: Bahut Pūjā Kar Lī, Ab Ūpar Jākē Karnā, lit. 'You've prayed enough already, now do it up there'). Initially, Kumar survived and sought shelter in nearby huts, but residents shut their doors. His driver Suraj was shot in both legs as he tried to shelter Kumar.

A Mumbai underworld organisation called D-Company is considered to have been responsible for this assassination. The police also accused film composer Nadeem Saifi of the music duo Nadeem–Shravan of having paid for the murder due to a personal dispute and fled the country after the murder. However, on 9 January 2001, Abdul Rauf Merchant (known as "Raja") confessed to being the murderer. On 29 April 2002, Sessions Judge M. L. Tahaliyani sentenced Rauf to life imprisonment, stating that he was not imposing the death penalty because the prosecution had failed to prove that Rauf was a contract killer. The police alleged that Saifi paid Abu Salem, a known associate of Dawood Ibrahim, to assassinate Kumar and assigned Rauf to the job, but it just so happened that Ibrahim and Abu Salem were already planning on murdering Kumar as he had refused to pay ₹10 crore protection money to D-Company as part of an extortion attempt. As per his family's wishes, Gulshan Kumar was cremated in a Shmashana (cremation ground) in Delhi.

Abdul Rauf alias Daud Merchant was convicted in 2002 for the murder of Gulshan Kumar. He fled India after he was granted furlough by the Bombay High Court in 2009. He was extradited from Bangladesh in 2016. He is currently lodged in the high-security Arthur Road Jail of Mumbai.

== Legacy ==
T-Series is still running and operated and has a widespread base across India. In 2017, T-Series announced plans to produce a biographical film about Kumar titled Mogul – The Gulshan Kumar Story.

== See also ==
- Music of Bollywood
- Brij Sadanah
- Divya Bharti
- Guru Dutt
- Raj Kiran (actor)
- List of people who disappeared mysteriously: post-1970
