= Tanya Singh =

Indian actress

- Occupations: Actress & Pop Singer
- Years active: 1993—2001
- Spouse: Krishan Kumar
- Children: 1
- Relatives: Nattasha Singh (sister)

Tanya Singh is a former Bollywood actress and pop singer known for her hit song " Woh Beete Din Yaad Hain " and her work in Aaja Meri Jaan (1993) and her music album Dhadkan (2000).

== Personal life ==
Singh is married to actor and T-Series owner Krishan Kumar. Their only daughter, Tishaa Kumar, died on 18 July 2024 at the age of 20, after a prolonged battle with an illness .

== Filmography ==
Year	Film	Role	Notes
1992	Aaja Meri Jaan	Sonu	
1993	Kanoon	Caretaker's daughter	
1999	Dhadkan		Music Album
2001	Khanki Hai Chudiyan		Pop Music Album
