= Aaja Meri Jaan =

- Directed by: Ketan Anand
- Written by: Pawan Sethi
- Produced by: Gulshan Kumar
- Starring: Krishan Kumar; Tanya Singh; Shammi Kapoor; Pran; Prem Chopra; Deven Verma
- Music by: Amar-Utpal
- Production company: T-Series Films
- Distributed by: T-Series Films
- Release date: 1 October 1993
- Running time: 162 minutes
- Country: India
- Language: Hindi

Aaja Meri Jaan (transl. Come, my beloved) is a 1993 Hindi-language romantic thriller film, written by Pawan Sethi and directed by Ketan Anand. It stars Krishan Kumar, Tanya Singh, with Shammi Kapoor, Pran, Prem Chopra, Deven Verma.

== Plot ==
A priest is stabbed to death by a mysterious murderer in a room in Majorda Beach Resort, Goa. Almost a year later, the new priest, Acharyaji, visits the police station, where police officer Jung assures him of the investigation.

Chand Kapoor is a young singer and dancer living in Mumbai. He comes to Goa to be with his uncle, Kapoor. They discuss about the dire financial conditions of the Majorda resort, of which Kapoor is the owner, and Chand comes up with an idea of a music festival with a lucrative prize to boost tourism in the area.

In the middle of a dance performance by Chand and Ruby in the resort, an employee diverts Chand with a message and then gives Ragini, Acharyaji's daughter, a note stating that Chand wants her to meet him in Room 112. Later, a guest who mistakenly enters the room finds her dead body.

Sonu, the younger daughter of Acharyaji, is devastated by her sister's death and is told by the police about a suspect, Chand. Sonu had received several letters from Ragini while in college describing her love for Chand. When Chand visits Acharyaji's home, she accuses him of the murder, and later tells her father she will find proof if she can get close enough to Chand.

Acharyaji sets up Chand with Kasturia, one of the business moguls in the area, who agrees to fund the music festival. All expenses taken care of, Chand, Sonu, Romeo who is a young dancer, Pinky who is the girlfriend of Romeo, and other youngsters usher in the festival with a song.

Sonu cozies up to Chand and gets him to arrange a boat trip for the two of them to an isolated destination, Braganza Island. But she drugs him during the trip, hoping to get any important clues out of him. But the plan goes horribly wrong as this causes the boat to capsize. After he manages to get them both ashore, they have a heated exchange of words, and he leaves her alone on the island. At night, alone and scared, she again runs into Chand. He keeps her company until morning, and she gets to know him better and is convinced of his innocence. She also finds herself falling for him. They decide to team up to find the real killer of Ragini.

Chand questions Charlie, the employee who diverted him on the night of the murder, who leads him to Chander. Chander confesses that he was the one who sent the note to Ragini that night, hoping to convince her how much he loved her. But he got to the room too late, only to find her dead body.

When Chand finds that the dancer, Romeo, is actually working undercover as a dancer and is really Anil Sharma, CBI officer in charge of the Ragini murder case, they team up. They pursue the one vital clue in the murder case, a matchbox of a club found on the dead body of Ragini. Pinky who has a similar matchbox, leads them to the Matchers Club in Mumbai, of which her father is a member. Chand breaks into the manager's room and gets to know from him that Matchers Club is a front for a crime ring. But before he reveals anything further, he is shot dead through the window.

Ruby, a dancer at the resort happens to be one of the members of the crime ring. Before she can reveal details of the crime ring to Chand, she is stabbed by an assassin. She dies in Chand's arms, but not before informing him of an important deal about to happen at the cemetery on Braganza Island.

Chand arrives at the cemetery and lies in wait. A "grave" opens on the ground, revealing a secret entrance to a tunnel. Two gang members emerge from the entrance, who are revealed to be Agarwal, the owner of the shop in which Ragini worked, and Jung. Finally the leader emerges, who is revealed to be the business mogul, Kasturia. At that moment, a number of people – Kapoor, Acharyaji, Sonu, Inspector Dubby, and several policemen – emerge from around to witness the exposure of the crime ring. Acharyaji assumes his real name, Brigadier Bhavani Singh Chauhan of Army Intelligence, and reveals that he has been assigned by CBI to investigate the criminal gang.

Chand explains to everyone how Ragini's murder occurred. That night, Chander had asked her to come to Room 112 assuming that it would be empty. However, the room was being used by Kasturia, Jung, and Agarwal to plan a massive smuggling operation. On arriving at the door, Ragini was caught overhearing the plan, and Kasturia stabbed her to death in the room.

Kasturia manages to take Sonu captive, and with the other gang members, escape back into the tunnel. Brigadier Chauhan/Acharyaji says that the tunnel must lead to the gang's hideout on the Old Ruins. Everyone heads there, and in the ensuing fight between the two sides, the police, aided by Chand and Romeo, overpower the goons. A few gang members, including Kasturia, Jung, and Agarwal, escape in a boat. In a shootout that follows, all the fleeing gang members are killed, with Kasturia crashing the boat on a rocky cliff.

In the end, Kapoor and Acharyaji give their blessings for the wedding of Chand and Sonu. Following suit, Khanna gives his blessings for the wedding of Romeo and Pinky.

== Cast ==
- Krishan Kumar as Chand Kapoor
- Tanya Singh as Sonu
- Shammi Kapoor as Mr. Kapoor
- Pran as Brigadier Bhavani Singh Chauhan / Acharyaji
- Prem Chopra as Kedarnath Khanna
- Deven Verma as Kasturia
- Durga Jasraj as Pinky
- Poonam Dasgupta as Ruby
- Sunil Lahri as Chandar
- Manohar Singh as Senior Police Officer Jung
- Govind Namdev as Inspector Dubby
- Satish Shah as Inspector Raj Malkani
- Rakesh Bedi as Batuklal
- Virendra Razdan as Mr. Agarwal
- Shiva Rindani as Charlie

== Production ==
The top cast Krishan Kumar and Tanya Singh made their debuts in the film. Tanya Singh, the daughter of music composer and singer Ajit Singh, was 17 when she signed up for the film. Krishan Kumar is the brother of producer Gulshan Kumar. The film budget was 2 Crore rupees.

The pair got married a decade later.

Singer Sonu Nigam also started his film singing career with film's song "O Aasmanwale Zameen Par Utarke Dekh".

== Soundtrack ==
Aaja Meri Jaan

Soundtrack album
- Released: 1993
- Genre: Feature film soundtrack
- Language: Hindi
- Label: T-Series

The music was composed by Amar-Utpal.

Song	Singer
"Aaja Aaja Meri Jaan"	S. P. Balasubrahmanyam, Anuradha Paudwal
"Aaja Sanam Warna To Hum"	S. P. Balasubrahmanyam, Anuradha Paudwal
"Bechain Kar Diya Hai"	S. P. Balasubrahmanyam, Anuradha Paudwal
"Maria Sun Le Mera Haal"	S. P. Balasubrahmanyam, Anuradha Paudwal
"Pagal Dil Mera Tumse"	S. P. Balasubrahmanyam, Anuradha Paudwal
"Shehar Ki Galiyon Mein"	S. P. Balasubrahmanyam, Anuradha Paudwal
"Novel Padha"	Anuradha Paudwal, Vinod Rathod
"Julie Julie"	Anuradha Paudwal, Mano
"Jhanjhra Leyade"	Anuradha Paudwal, Mano
"Teri Hai Nazar"	Anuradha Paudwal
"Ishq Mein Hum"	Sonu Nigam
"O Aasmanwale"	Sonu Nigam

- The only Song "Aaja Meri Jaan" was composed by R. D. Burman.
