= Ayee Milan Ki Raat =

- Poster
- Directed by: K Pappu
- Written by: M. Parvez
- Produced by: Gulshan Kumar
- Starring: Avinash Wadhavan; Shaheen
- Music by: Anand–Milind
- Release date: 26 April 1991
- Country: India
- Language: Hindi

Ayee Milan Ki Raat is a 1991 Bollywood musical romantic film directed by K. Pappu produced by Gulshan Kumar, starring Avinash Wadhavan, Shaheen, Aruna Irani, Alok Nath, Anupam Kher and Rita Bhaduri.

== Cast ==
- Rita Bhaduri as Thakur's wife
- Aruna Irani as Suraj's mother
- Kulbhushan Kharbanda as Thakur
- Anupam Kher as Bajrangi / Sumer Singh / Baldev Singh
- Avinash Wadhavan as Suraj
- Shaheen as Kiran, Suraj's love interest
- Paresh Rawal as Yogiraj
- Alok Nath as Hari Ram, Suraj's father
- Kunickaa Sadanand as Dhanno
- Sushmita Mukherjee as Baldev Singh's wife
- Birbal as Munim

== Soundtrack ==
All songs were very popular with the songs "Mat Ro Mere Dil" and "Ishq Da Rog Laga" being chartbusters. The most popular singer duo of the late 1980s and early 1990s Anuradha Paudwal & Mohammed Aziz sang most of the songs.

- No.	Title	Performer(s)	Length
  1.	"Kitne Dino Ke Baad Hai Aayi (Raga Puriya Dhanashree)"	Mohammed Aziz, Anuradha Paudwal
  2.	"Kala Shah Kala"	Anuradha Paudwal
  3.	"Tune Pyar Ki Been Bajai"	Mohammed Aziz, Anuradha Paudwal
  4.	"Kasam Se Kasam Se"	Mohammed Aziz, Anuradha Paudwal
  5.	"Saawan Ka Mahina Aaya Hai"	Mohammed Aziz, Anuradha Paudwal
  6.	"Mat Ro Mere Dil"	Udit Narayan, Anuradha Paudwal
  7.	"Dekhen Apni Kismat Mein Kaanta"	Mohammed Aziz, Anuradha Paudwal
  8.	"Maine Kisiko Dil De Diya"	Udit Narayan, Anuradha Paudwal
  9.	"Ishaq Da Rog Laga"	Anuradha Paudwal
  10.	"Jab Do Dil Milte Hai"	Mohammed Aziz, Anuradha Paudwal
  11.	"Har Ek Se Milna Has Haskar"	Suresh Wadkar, Anuradha Paudwal
