= Lal Dupatta Malmal Ka =

Indian television film 1989

- Vinyl Record Cover
- Directed by: Ravinder Peepat
- Screenplay by: Ranbir Pushp
- Produced by: Gulshan Kumar
- Starring: Sahil Chaddha; Veverly; Gulshan Kumar
- Music by: Anand–Milind
- Production company: T-Series
- Release date: 2 June 1988 (India)
- Country: India
- Language: Hindi

Lal Dupatta Malmal Ka is a 1988 Hindi direct-to-video film. It starred Sahil Chaddha and Veverly in lead roles. A sequel titled Phir Lehraya Lal Dupatta was made later that year with Sahil and Veverly reprising their roles.

== Cast ==
- Sahil Chaddha as Shalu
- Veverly as Shabbo
- Gulshan Kumar
- Dan Dhanoa as Banwari
- Vijayendra Ghatge as Chaudhary
- Ram Mohan as Shabbo's Father

== Soundtrack ==
Songs were sung by Anuradha Paudwal, Mohammed Aziz, Suresh Wadkar, Pankaj Udhas, and Udit Narayan also lent voice to one song. Majrooh Sultanpuri was the lyricist.

#	Title	Singer(s)	Raga
1	"Kya Batlayen Janejaan"	Anuradha Paudwal, Udit Narayan	Shivaranjani
2	"Suni Suni Ankhiyon Mein"	Suresh Wadkar, Anuradha Paudwal	
3	"Lal Dupatta Malmal Ka"	Mohammed Aziz	
4	"Main Gul Hoon Kali Hoon"	Anuradha Paudwal, Mohammed Aziz	
5	"Na Jane Kyon Main Bekaraar"	Anuradha Paudwal, Udit Narayan	
6	"Tumne Rakh To Lee Tasveer Hamari"	Anuradha Paudwal, Pankaj Udhas	
7	"Ab Dawa Ki Jaroorat Nahin"	Anuradha Paudwal, Mohammed Aziz	
8	"Lal Dupatta Malmal Ka" (Sad)	Mohammed Aziz	
9	"Kuch Baat Hai Tum Mein Jo"	Anuradha Paudwal, Pankaj Udhas	
10	"Raqeebon Se Habibon Se"	Suresh Wadekar, Anuradha Paudwal	
