= Nazar Andaaz =

2022 Indian film

- Theatrical Release Poster
- Directed by: Vikrant Deshmukh
- Written by: Rishi Virmani
- Produced by: Laxman Utekar; Bhushan Kumar; Karishma Sharma
- Starring: Abhishek Banerjee; Divya Dutta; Kumud Mishra
- Cinematography: Rakesh Singh
- Edited by: Manish Pradhan
- Music by: Vishal Mishra
- Production companies: T-Series Films; Kathputli Creations Production
- Distributed by: AA Films
- Release date: 7 October 2022
- Running time: 104 minutes
- Country: India
- Language: Hindi

Nazar Andaaz (transl. Turn a blind eye) is a 2022 Indian Hindi-language comedy film directed by Vikrant Deshmukh and starring Abhishek Banerjee, Divya Dutta and Kumud Mishra. The film was released on 7 October 2022.

== Synopsis ==
Sudhir (Kumud Mishra) is blind by birth and lives alone with his housemaid Bhavani (Divya Dutta) While Bhavani is out one day, he takes in Ali (Abhishek Banerjee) to help around the house. Both Bhavani and Ali grow envious of each other. Nazar Andaaz is a comedic yet heartfelt story of these three.

== Cast ==
- Kumud Mishra as Sudhir
- Divya Dutta as Bhavani
- Abhishek Banerjee as Ali
- Shyam Bhimsaria as the Lawyer

== Production ==
The film was announced in March 2022, Kumud Mishra was confirmed to be cast in lead role.

The principal photography of the film started in mid-March 2022.

== Soundtrack ==
Nazar Andaaz

Soundtrack album by Vishal Mishra
- Released: 8 November 2022
- Recorded: 2022
- Studio: VM Studio
- Genre: Feature film soundtrack
- Length: 21:27
- Language: Hindi
- Label: T-Series

The film's music is composed by Vishal Mishra while the all lyrics are written by Raj Shekhar.

Track listing
No.	Title	Singer(s)	Length
1.	"Lootere Aa Gaye"	Sachet Tandon, Mohammed Danish	2:23
2.	"Kitne Andekhe Rang"	Vishal Mishra	3:27
3.	"Aadhi Kahani"	Jubin Nautiyal	3:30
4.	"Jadoo"	Parampara Tandon	3:29
5.	"Sukoon"	Armaan Malik	4:21
6.	"Sukoon (Female Version)"	Tulsi Kumar	4:21
Total length:			21:27

== Release ==
The film was scheduled to release on 7 October 2022.

== Reception ==
Archika Khurana of The Times of India gave the film three out of five, writing, "Conceptually, Nazar Andaaz is not extraordinary, but it effectively conveys a view of life that is beautiful with the right attitude. This drama is under-promoted; otherwise, this 104-minute underdog film wins against all odds."
