= Khushalii Kumar =

Indian actress (born 1998)

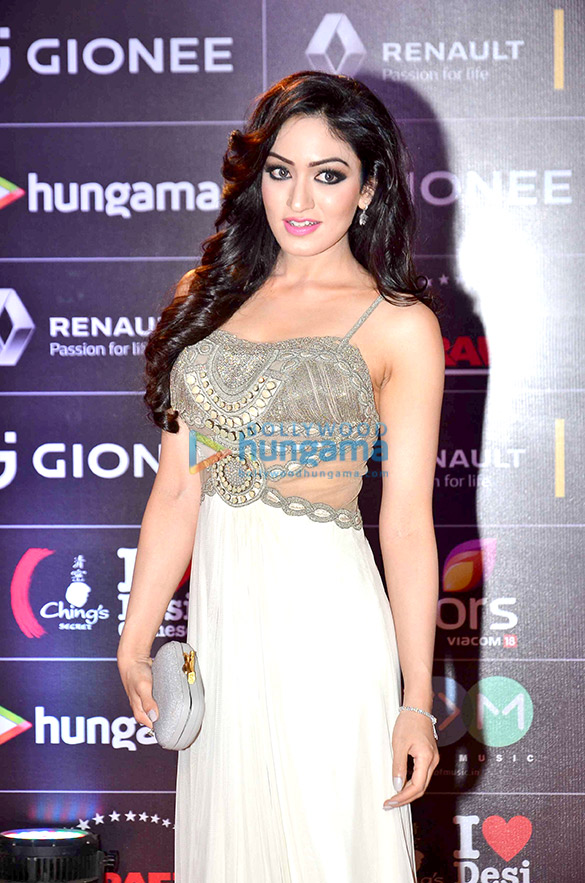
- Kumar in 2023
- Born: Khushali Kumar Dua; 19 December 1988 (age 37); Mumbai, Maharashtra, India
- Occupation: Actress
- Years active: 2021–present
- Parent(s): Gulshan Kumar (father); Sudesh Kumari (mother)
- Relatives: Kumar family

Khushalii Kumar is an Indian film actress and fashion designer. Born to the Kumar family, she is the daughter of Gulshan Kumar. Her siblings are Bhushan Kumar and Tulsi Kumar, and her uncle is Krishan Kumar. She has also appeared in music videos.

== Personal life ==
Khushali Kumar was born in a Hindu Punjabi family to Gulshan Kumar, the founder of T-Series, and mother Sudesh Kumari Dua in Mumbai on 19 December 1988. She added an extra "i" in her name due to numerological reasons.

After graduating in Fashion Designing from NIFT, Delhi, she went on to create designs worn by Shakira, Leann Rimes, Jenna Dewan, Melanie C, Carmen Electra amongst others. She also designed for Justin Bieber’s music video "Wait for a Minute".

== Career ==
Khushali made her music video debut with "Mere Papa, Ik Yaad Purani", a song sung by sister Tulsi Kumar as a tribute to her late father Gulshan Kumar. In 2015, she appeared in the music video "Mainu Ishq Da" and has since appeared in popular songs like "Highway Star", "Raat Kamaal Hai" (the latter by Guru Randhawa).

In 2018, she acted in a few short films, among which was T-Series's Jeena Mushkil Hai Yaar. Kumar was set to be launched by her brother Bhushan Kumar, the head of T-Series in the comedy film Dahi Cheeni in July 2019. R. Madhavan was roped in to play the male lead. The film was to be helmed by debutant Ashween Neal Mani and was to focus on a true event that speaks about the problems faced by different societies in the world. However, the final script of the film did not turn out the way the makers had envisioned. Hence, T-Series has put the film on hold and decided to launch Khushali in a different film with the same cast but different direction team. As a result, Kumar started her acting career along with Madhavan in 2022 film Dhokha: Round D Corner, for which she won the Star Debut of the Year – Female award at the 23rd ceremony of India's IIFA Awards.

Then, she appeared in the lead role in the 2023 film Starfish. For Kumar, the shooting of the film was very challenging. She said, "It was so freezing cold that everyone was wearing jackets while I was in a dress, ready to jump in the water".

In 2024, Kumar appeared in the lead role in Dedh Bigha Zameen which was released on JioCinema.

Kumar's upcoming projects are Hide, Crossfire and Dil Katiya.

== Filmography ==
†	Denotes films that have not yet been released

Year	Title	Role	Notes	Ref.
2022	Dhokha: Round D Corner	Saanchi Sinha		
2023	Starfish	Tara Salgaonkar		
2024	Dedh Bigha Zameen	Pooja Singh	JioCinema film	
2024	Ghudchadi	Devika	JioCinema film	
2026	Sapne Vs Everyone (season 2)	Tripti	TVF Originals	
2026	Dulhaniya Le Aaeegi	Navya		
