= Krishan Kumar (actor) =

Indian film actor and producer

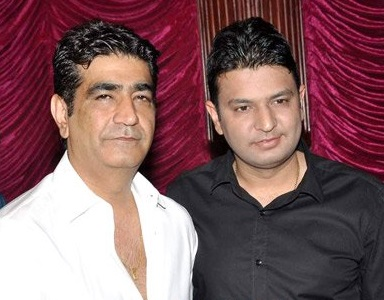
- Krishan Kumar (left) with his nephew Bhushan Kumar
- Born: Krishan Kumar Dua
- Occupations: Actor, film producer
- Years active: 1982–present
- Known for: Bewafa Sanam (1995), T-Series
- Spouse: Tanya Singh
- Children: 1
- Relatives: Gulshan Kumar (brother); Bhushan Kumar (nephew); Tulsi Kumar (niece); Khushalii Kumar (niece); Nattasha Singh (sister-in-law)
- Family: Kumar family

Krishan Kumar Dua is an Indian actor and producer. He is best known for Bewafa Sanam (1995) and owning the largest music producing company in India, T-Series.

== Personal life ==
He was born Krishan Kumar Dua in a Punjabi Hindu family, the son of fruit seller Chandrabhan who had migrated to Delhi from Lahore after the partition of India. He is the younger brother of Gulshan Kumar, founder of Super Cassettes Industries/T-Series. Kumar married actress Tanya Singh, the daughter of composer of Ajit Singh and sister of actress Nattasha Singh. Their only daughter, Tishaa Kumar, died on 18 July 2024 at the age of 21, after a prolonged battle with cancer.

== Filmography ==
=== As actor ===
Year	Film	Role
1993	Aaja Meri Jaan	Chand Kapoor
1993	Kasam Teri Kasam	Ravi
1993	Shabnam	
1995	Bewafa Sanam	Sundar Sehgal
1998	Pagla Kahin Ka	Album
2000	Papa The Great	Jai Prakash

=== As producer ===
List of Krishan Kumar film credits as producer
Year	Title	Notes
2005	Lucky: No Time for Love	
2006	Humko Deewana Kar Gaye	
2007	Darling	
2011	Link Road	
2011	Ready	Co-producers – Rajat Rawail; Bhushan Kumar; Nitin Manmohan; Sohail Khan
2013	Nautanki Saala!	
2016	Airlift	
2018	Satyameva Jayate	
2018	Sonu Ke Titu Ki Sweety	
2019	De De Pyaar De	
2019	Marjaavaan	
2020	Tanhaji	Co-producers Ajay Devgn; Bhushan Kumar
2020	Thappad	Co-producers Anubhav Sinha; Bhushan Kumar
2020	Jai Mummy Di	Co-producers Luv Ranjan; Ankur Garg; Bhushan Kumar
2021	Thank God	
2021	Satyameva Jayate 2	
2022	Chandigarh Kare Aashiqui	Co-producers – Bhushan Kumar; Pragya Kapoor; Abhishek Nayyar
2022	Adipurush	Co-producer – Bhushan Kumar
2022	Bhool Bhulaiyaa 2	Co-producer – Bhushan Kumar
2022	Ek Villain Returns	
2022	Vikram Vedha	Co-producer – S. Sashikanth; Bhushan Kumar; Chakravarthy Ramachandra; Vivek B. Agrawal; Neeraj Pandey
2022	Mister Mummy	Co-producers Bhushan Kumar; Siva Ananth; Shaad Ali
2022	Faraaz	Co-producers Bhushan Kumar; Anubhav Sinha
2023	Shehzada	Co-producers Bhushan Kumar; Aman Gill; Allu Aravind; S. Radha Krishna; Kartik Aaryan
2023	Gumraah	Co-producers Bhushan Kumar; Murad Khetani; Anjum Ketani
2024	Vicky Vidya Ka Woh Wala Video	Co-producers Bhushan Kumar; Ekta Kapoor; Shobha Kapoor; Vipul D. Shah; Ashwin Varde; Rajesh Bahl; Raaj Shaandilyaa; Vimal Lahoti
2025	De De Pyaar De 2	Co-producers Bhushan Kumar Luv Ranjan Ankur Garg
2026	Assi	Co-producers Bhushan Kumar; Anubhav Sinha
