= Hate Story (film series) =

Indian erotic film series

- Directed by: Vivek Agnihotri (Hate Story); Vishal Pandya (Hate Story 2 – Hate Story 3 – Hate Story IV)
- Screenplay by: Vikram Bhatt (Hate Story, Hate Story 3); Madhuri Banerjee (Hate Story 2); Sameer Arora; Vishal Pandya (Hate Story IV)
- Produced by: Vikram Bhatt (Hate Story); Bhushan Kumar (Hate Story 2 – Hate Story IV)
- Starring: See below
- Cinematography: Attar Singh Saini (Hate Story); Kedar Gaikwad (Hate Story 2); Prakash Kutty (Hate Story 3); Sunita Radia (Hate Story IV)
- Edited by: Satyajeet Gazmer (Hate Story); Kuldip Mehan (Hate Story 2); Manish More (Hate Story 3, Hate Story IV)
- Music by: Songs: Harshit Saxena (Hate Story); Arko, Mithoon (Hate Story 2, Hate Story IV); Meet Bros Anjjan, Rashid Khan, Sumit Sethi, Prince (Hate Story 2); Amaal Mallik, Meet Bros, Baman (Hate Story 3); Tanishk Bagchi, Tony Kakkar, Baman–Chand (Hate Story IV); Score: Amar Mohile (Hate Story); Sunny and Inder Bawra (Hate Story 2 – Hate Story IV)
- Production companies: BVG Films (Hate Story); T-Series Films (Hate Story 2 – Hate Story IV); Super T Films UK Ltd (Hate Story IV)
- Distributed by: ASA Productions and Enterprises, Rajvi Entertainment, Dhanraj Films (Hate Story); T-Series Films (Hate Story 2, Hate Story 3); AA Films (Hate Story IV)
- Release dates: 20 April 2012 (1); 18 July 2014 (2); 4 December 2015 (3); 9 March 2018 (4)
- Running time: 510 minutes
- Country: India
- Language: Hindi
- Budget: ₹61 crore
- Box office: ₹136.31 crore

Hate Story is an Indian erotic thriller film series produced by Vikram Bhatt and Bhushan Kumar under the banners BVG Films and T-Series.

The first film, directed by Vivek Agnihotri, was released in 2012.

The second film, directed by Vishal Pandya, was released in 2014.

The third film, also directed by Vishal Pandya, was released on 4 December 2015.

The fourth and final film, again directed by Vishal Pandya, was released on 9 March 2018. Hate Story 3 remains the most commercially successful film in the franchise.

== Cast ==
=== Hate Story (2012 film) ===
- Paoli Dam as Kavya Krishnan
- Gulshan Devaiah as Siddharth Dhanrajgir
- Nikhil Dwivedi as Vicky
- Joy Sengupta as Rajdev Singh
- Mohan Kapoor as Cabinet minister Malhotra
- Bhairavi Goswami as Bhairavi
- Iravati Harshe as Rajdev's Wife
- Gopal K. Singh as Inspector
- Saurabh Dubey as Kumar Dhanrajgir
- Mukti Mohan in special appearance in the song 'Raat'

=== Hate Story 2 (2014 film) ===
- Sushant Singh as Mandar Mhatre
- Surveen Chawla as Sonika Prasad
- Jay Bhanushali as Akshay Bedi
- Siddharth Kher as Inspector Anton Varghese
- Rajesh Khera as Atul Mhatre
- Neha Kaul as Mandar's Wife
- Sunny Leone in a special appearance in the song 'Pink Lips'

=== Hate Story 3 (2015 film) ===
- Sharman Joshi as Aditya Deewan
- Zarine Khan as Siya Deewan
- Karan Singh Grover as Saurav Singhania / Karan
- Daisy Shah as Kaya
- Prithvi Zutshi as Vaswani
- Puja Gupta in Special appearance in song "Neendein Khul Jaati Hain"

=== Hate Story 4 (2018 film) ===
- Urvashi Rautela as Natasha Choudhary (Tasha)
- Vivan Bhatena as Aryan Khurana
- Karan Wahi as Rajveer Khurana
- Ihana Dhillon as Rishma
- Gulshan Grover as Vik
- Tia Bajpai as Bhavna (special appearance)
- Shaad Randhawa as Ashwin (special appearance)

== Crew ==
Occupation	Film			
Occupation	Hate Story (2012)	Hate Story 2 (2014)	Hate Story 3 (2015)	Hate Story IV (2018)
Director	Vivek Agnihotri	Vishal Pandya	Vishal Pandya	Vishal Pandya
Producer(s)	Vikram Bhatt	Bhushan Kumar; Krishan Kumar	Bhushan Kumar; Krishan Kumar	Bhushan Kumar; Krishan Kumar
Executive Producer(s)	Manmohan D. Singh; Dharmendra Rawal	Manmohan D. Singh	Vivek Bhatnagar	Vivek Bhatnagar
Writer(s)	Vikram Bhatt	Vikram Bhatt; Madhuri Banerjee; Sammeer Arora	Vikram Bhatt; Madhuri Banerjee; Sammeer Arora	Vikram Bhatt; Madhuri Banerjee; Sammeer Arora
Cinematography	Attar Singh Saini	Kedar Gaikwad	Prakash Kutty	Sunita Radia
Scored by	Amar Mohile	Sunny and Inder Bawra	Sunny and Inder Bawra	Sunny and Inder Bawra
Soundtrack album composer(s)	Harshit Saxena	Arko; Meet Bros Anjjan; Mithoon; Rashid Khan; Sumit; Prince	Amaal Mallik; Meet Bros; Baman	Tanishk Bagchi; Arko; Mithoon; Tonny Kakkar; Baman
Editor(s)	Satyajeet Gazmer	Kuldip Mehan	Manish More	Manish More

== Release and revenue ==
Film	Release date	Budget	Box office revenue
Hate Story	20 April 2012	₹9 crore	₹16.43 crore
Hate Story 2	18 July 2014	₹15 crore	₹31.07 crore
Hate Story 3	4 December 2015	₹20 crore	₹62.21 crore
Hate Story IV	9 March 2018	₹21 crore	₹26.60 crore
Total		₹65 crore	₹136.31 crore
