= Hate Story =

2012 film by Vivek Agnihotri

- Theatrical release poster
- Directed by: Vivek Agnihotri
- Written by: Vikram Bhatt; Rohit Malhotra (dialogues)
- Produced by: Vikram Bhatt
- Starring: Nikhil Dwivedi; Gulshan Devaiya; Paoli Dam; Mohan Kapoor; Joy Sengupta
- Cinematography: Attar Singh Saini
- Edited by: Satyajeet Gazmer
- Music by: Songs: Harshit Saxena; Score: Amar Mohile
- Production company: BVG Films (a division of ASA)
- Distributed by: ASA Productions and Enterprises; Rajvi Entertainment Pvt. Ltd.; Dhanraj Films Pvt. Ltd.
- Release date: 20 April 2012
- Running time: 139 minutes
- Country: India
- Language: Hindi
- Budget: ₹9 crore
- Box office: est. ₹16.43 crore

Hate Story is a 2012 Indian Hindi-language erotic thriller film directed by Vivek Agnihotri and produced by Vikram Bhatt. It stars Nikhil Dwivedi, Gulshan Devaiya and Paoli Dam and the film was released on 20 April 2012. The first installment in the Hate Story film series the film was a commercial and critical success. The premise of the film chronicles a woman and her struggle to fight against the man who betrayed her.

== Plot ==
Journalist Kavya Krishna and her male best friend, Vicky, pull off a sting operation against a big company which happens to belong to tycoon Siddharth Dhanrajgir. Siddharth, being a rich and cocky young man, wants revenge. He offers Kavya a job in his company with a three hundred percent raise in income. Kavya accepts his offer immediately. They go on a business trip together, and Kavya helps Siddharth get his company a good deal. That night, Siddharth takes Kavya to dinner, where they connect romantically and end up having sex. Upon returning, Kavya brings gifts for Vicky and tells him she loves her job.

The next day, Kavya goes to work and finds out that her entry pass to the office has been cancelled. She goes to talk to Siddharth, who talks about his plan and pulls a gun out, and says that he never had feelings for her; he just wanted revenge for the sting operation she pulled. Heartbroken, Kavya leaves and applies for another job with Vicky's support. Vicky takes her to the doctor only to find out that she is pregnant with Siddharth's child. Kavya immediately meets Siddharth, who once again humiliates her. That night, Siddharth calls her and pretends to be sorry. He has her kidnapped, her foetus aborted, her ovaries taken out, and then disposes of her.

Vowing revenge, Kavya becomes a prostitute and seduces various businessmen related to Cementic Group to get to Siddharth. First she contacts the CEO of cement company Cementec, Rajdev Singh, sleeps with him, and without his knowledge copies email from his phone. From there she learns that Cementec is going to do a joint venture with a German company due to which all shares of Delhi Cements company will fall. She leaks this information to Delhi Cements Chairman, Deshraj Tandon at the cost of ₹ 40 million. Deshraj Tandon then organizes a press conference and withdraws his support to Cementic Group causing a huge loss to Siddharth and his company. Kavya then reveals this to Siddharth and challenges him that she will destroy him. Siddharth then has cameras placed all over her house without her knowledge but Kavya realises this after spotting a camera. Kavya uses this weapon against him by inviting Rajdev to her home and seducing him. Knowing that Siddharth is viewing the footage, Kavya is able to entice Rajdev for more information regarding Cementec's future operations and scams, while in return, providing him with false information regarding Cementec's competitors.

Siddharth views this footage and learns that Rajdev is responsible for the leaking of information. Siddharth also comes to believe the false information provided by Kavya to be true, resulting in Cementec suffering a loss of ₹ 100 billion. Siddharth has Rajdev killed and puts the blame for Cementec's downfall on Kavya resulting in her arrest. Kavya takes help from a cabinet minister to escape from jail by blackmailing him. She also offers to sleep with him at the cost of recovering the police file which contains her name and nominating her to the post of director of IIBI bank which holds account details for Cementec.

She becomes a board member for Cementec and accesses their files discovering a big scam with the help of Vicky. However, Vicky is devastated by Kavya's actions in the order she's taking revenge. He tells her to sleep with more men to help her out. Kavya confronts Vicky and tells about her suffering and motivations. She never slept with anyone but only with those people connected to Sidharth to destroy him. All this leads to an argument where Vicky confesses his love for Kavya which she was unaware of. Kavya feels guilty of trusting Sidharth instead of Vicky. Vicky, while still in love with Kavya agrees to help her one last time and exposes the entire scam of Sidharth. To stop Kavya from reaching the meeting, Sidharth gets Vicky kidnapped and blackmails Kavya to not bother him during the meeting. He also orders his men to kill Vicky once the meeting is over. However, Vicky manages to free himself, and calls Kavya and pushes her to go to the meeting.

Kavya now all prepared exposes the entire scam at the annual general meeting. Siddharth is arrested for stealing millions from shareholders. Kavya decides to start a fresh life with Vicky. She goes back to her own house. There she finds Rajdev's wife waiting for her with a gun. Rajdev's wife shoots Kavya thinking that she killed her husband. After killing Kavya she shoots herself too. The movie ends with Kavya's background voice saying, "Mare hue log kabar se nahi dara karte, Vicky."(Dead people are not scared of the grave, Vicky).

== Cast ==
- Paoli Dam as Kavya Krishna
- Nikhil Dwivedi as Vicky
- Gulshan Devaiah as Siddharth Dhanrajgir
- Mohan Kapoor as Cabinet minister K. Malhotra
- Joy Sengupta as Rajdev "Raj" Singh
- Saurabh Dubey as Kumar Dhanrajgir
- Iravati Harshe as Archana Jaidev Singh
- Bhairavi Goswami as Bhairavi
- Gopal K Singh as Inspector
- Mukesh W. Tyagi
- Mukti Mohan as special appearance in the song Raat
- Sandeep Yadav

== Production ==
Vivek Agnihotri confirmed that the sex scenes in the film were not simulated. "I had explained to Paoli that I didn't want to sham the nudity or the love-making," he said. "She understood what her character was supposed to do. I expected my leading man to be shy. Usually, in our films, it's the male who has more inhibitions about stripping, kissing, and love-making. There's too much performance anxiety in the male. Gulshan was every bit as unabashed as Paoli. What we've captured in the film is the kind of explicit love-making never seen in Hindi films."

== Release ==
=== Censorship ===
Before the release of the film, the CBFC (Central Board of Film Certification) ordered the sex scenes in the movie to be reduced by 50%, dialogues were left untouched. Vikram Bhatt has sarcastically praised the censors and was quoted to have said - . "The censor board has been great. They've passed all the dialogues and only got us to cut the excesses in the love-making scenes. I'm extremely pleased with their progressive thinking. "

=== Critical reception ===
Subhash K. Jha of IANS has given 3.5 out of 5 stars by saying, "'Hate Story' is a most riveting and aesthetic saga of a woman's revenge against the man.". Taran Adarsh of Bollywood Hungama gave the film a score of 3 out of 5 and said, "On the whole, HATE STORY banks on the age-old vendetta theme, but what takes it beyond the mediocre mark is the cat and mouse game played by the protagonist and antagonist, besides, of course, the bold and provocative scenes that add spice to the proceedings. Though engaging in parts, there's no denying that the second hour seizes your attention, making it a watchable experience.". Srijana Mitra Das for The Times of India has given 3 out of 5 stars and says "'So, yeah, Hate Story exposes a lot - underneath Delhi's surface, that is, not really, as the adverts so tantalizingly showcased, of leading lady Paoli Dam. The film instead blows the top right off the dirty deals, the, well, intercourse between different power spheres ruling India's capital - business, politics, journalism, police, all meet in this slick flick. Depending on who you are, the intersections provide some pleasure - and lots of pain."

Raja Sen for Rediff.com has given 1.5/5 stars and says, "Despites its bold promos, Hate Story offers very little skin show."

== Soundtrack ==
Hate Story

Soundtrack album by Harshit Saxena
- Released: 3 April 2012
- Recorded: 2012
- Studio: Golden Chariot
- Genres: Film soundtrack; Bollywood
- Length: 34:33
- Language: Hindi
- Label: T-Series

Harshit Saxena chronology
| Murder 2 (2011) | Hate Story (2012) | Super Nani (2014) |

Background score of the film is composed by Amar Mohile.

All lyrics are written by Kumaar and Shabbir Ahmed; all music is composed by Harshit Saxena.

Digital version track listing
| No. | Title | Singer(s) | Length |
|---|---|---|---|
| 1. | "Mahe Jaan" | Harshit Saxena | 5:53 |
| 2. | "Dil Kanch Sa" | Krishna Beura | 6:29 |
| 3. | "Raat" | Sunidhi Chauhan | 5:53 |
| 4. | "Mahe Jaan" (rock version) | Harshit Saxena | 5:16 |
| 5. | "Raat" (remix) | Sunidhi Chauhan | 4:32 |
| 6. | "Dil Kanch Sa" (heart & soul version) | Harshit Saxena | 6:30 |
| Total length: | | | 34:33 |

== Box office ==
The film was a commercial success collecting 16.43 crore worldwide. The film's total nett gross was ₹12.01 crore and was declared "Average" by the Box Office India.

== Sequels ==
A sequel, entitled Hate Story 2 released on 18 July 2014. The film stars Surveen Chawla, Jay Bhanushali and Sushant Singh. Its second sequel is Hate Story 3, starring Sharman Joshi, Zarine Khan, Karan Singh Grover and Daisy Shah. It was released on 4 December 2015. Both sequels were commercially successful. On 9 March 2018 Hate Story 4 was released starring Urvashi Rautela in the lead, which was not very successful at box office.
