= Babloo Bachelor =

Indian film directed by Agnidev Chatterjee

- Theatrical release poster
- Directed by: Agnidev Chatterjee
- Screenplay by: Saurabh M Pandey
- Story by: Saurabh M Pandey
- Produced by: Ajay Rajwani
- Starring: Sharman Joshi; Pooja Chopra; Tejashri Pradhan
- Cinematography: Agnidev Chatterjee
- Edited by: Parth Bhatt
- Music by: Indraadip Dasgupta
- Production company: Rafat Films
- Distributed by: JAI VIRATRA ENTERTAINMENT LIMITED ( MANOJ NANDWANA )
- Release date: 22 October 2021
- Running time: 130 minutes
- Country: India
- Language: Hindi

Babloo Bachelor is a 2021 Indian Hindi-language film directed by Agnidev Chatterjee, starring Sharman Joshi, Pooja Chopra, and Tejashri Pradhan. The soundtrack is composed by Jeet Gannguli and Indradip Dasgupta. The film was released on 22 October 2021.

== Plot ==
This film is based in Kanpur, Uttar Pradesh, where a middle-class family always dreamed of their son's wedding. Babloo has met with a few girls hoping to find his bride, but none of the girls were right. Finally Babloo met Avantika, who had 5 boyfriends before meeting Babloo. Avantika requests Babloo to reject the proposal and Babloo rejects her for marriage. After one month at a cousin's wedding, Babloo met Swati, who he ends up falling in love with, eventually proposing. On their wedding night, Swati runs away after mixing sleeping pills in Babloo's drink and leaving Babloo a letter. Babloo sees an ad in the newspaper about the shows of Swati, and traveled to Mumbai to find her and bring her home back. While in Mumbai, Babloo runs into Avantika, where he tells Avantika his feelings about Swati and she agrees to help him win her back. While speaking with Avantika, Babloo realizes she is a good person regardless of her past engagements, leaving Babloo to choose between two women.

== Cast ==
- Sharman Joshi as Babloo
- Pooja Chopra as Avantika
- Tejashri Pradhan as Swati
- Rajesh Sharma as Babloo's Father
- Leena Prabhu as Babloo's Mother
- Neeraj Khetarpal as Babloo's Chacha
- Sumit Gulati as Babloo's Friend
- Beena Bhat as Babloo's Sister
- Raju Kher as Prabhat
- Charu Rohatgi as Prabhat Wife
- Sweety Walia as Sharman Bua
- Manoj Joshi as Phopa
- Akash Dhabade as Friend
- Dolly Chawla as Bua's Daughter
- Asrani as Broker
- Puneet Vashist as Village Boy
- Deepali Sharma as Ankh Marne wali Girl
- Ashok Awasthi as Ankh Marne wali girl's father
- Mousumi Dutta as Gymnastic Girl
- Deepali Singh as Feet Attack Girl
- Mukesh Padhya as Feet Attack girl's father
- Nidhi Vikram as Bhabhi

== Soundtrack ==
Babloo Bachelor

Soundtrack album by Jeet Gannguli & Indradip Dasgupta
- Released: 4 March 2020
- Recorded: 2019
- Genre: Feature film soundtrack
- Length: 31:41
- Label: Zee Music Company

Official audio
- Babloo Bachelor - Full Album on YouTube

Singles from Babloo Bachelor
- 1. "Aye Meri Zindagi" Released: 4 March 2020; 2. "Kasam" Released: 4 March 2020; 3. "Jealous" Released: 12 March 2020

The soundtrack was composed by Jeet Gannguli and Indradip Dasgupta. Lyrics were written by Rashmi Virag, Kumaar and Ashish Pandit.

Track listing
No.	Title	Artist (s)	Length
1.	"Kasam"	Arijit Singh	4:36
2.	"Aye Meri Zindagi"	Papon	5:02
3.	"Jiya Nahin Lagta"	Jeet Gannguli, Akanksha Sharma	3:33
4.	"Banna Banni"	Bappi Lahiri, Shreya Ghoshal	4:24
5.	"Jealous" (Lyrics by Kumaar)	Jeet Gannguli, Dev Negi	3:01
6.	"Aye Meri Zindagi (Female Version)"	Payal Dev	5:02
7.	"Tum Ho" (Lyrics by Ashish Pandit & Music by Indraadip Dasgupta)	Arijit Singh	6:17
Total length:			31:41
