= FNP =

FNP may refer to

== Politics ==
- Fijian Nationalist Party, a defunct political party in Fiji
- Freedom Now Party, a defunct political party in the United States
- Frisian National Party, a political party in the Netherlands
- National Progressive Force (Spanish: Fuerza Nacional Progresista), a political party in the Dominican Republic

== Other uses ==
- FNP (complexity)
- Family nurse practitioner
- FlexNet Publisher, a software license manager
- FN FNP, a series of pistols
- Foundation for Polish Science, (Polish: Fundacja na rzecz Nauki Polskiej)
- Friday Night Productions, an Indian entertainment company
- The Friday Night Project, a British television programme
- The Frederick News-Post, a newspaper in Frederick, Maryland
- Frankfurter Neue Presse, a German daily newspaper based in Frankfurt am Main
- National Property Administration in Taiwan
