= Leena Kapoor =

Indian model and actress

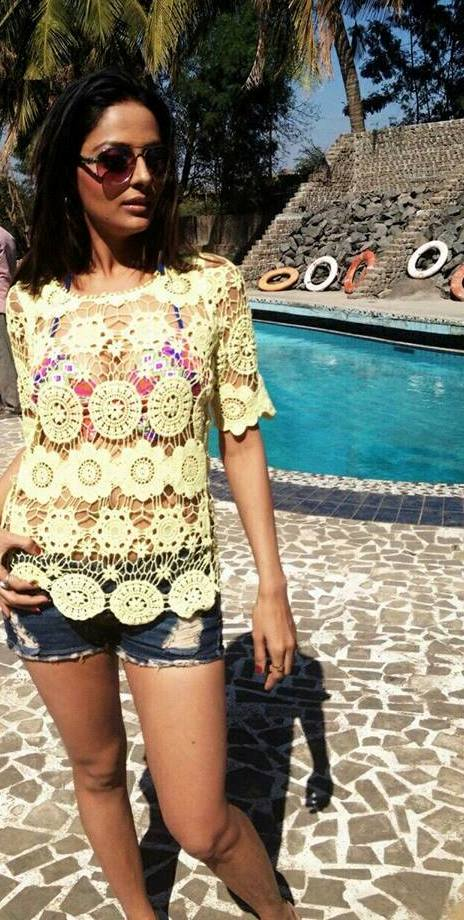
- Born: Delhi, India
- Occupations: Model; Actress
- Years active: 2007–present
- Modeling information
- Hair color: Black
- Eye color: Brown

Leena Kapoor is an Indian model and actress known for her works in Hindi cinema and Malayalam television. Born and raised in Delhi, she began her career as a model before transitioning into acting. Before her debut in films, Kapoor appeared in more than fifty Punjabi music videos, television commercials, and the Channel V series Love Net – Season 2.

== Career ==
Kapoor began her career as a model in Delhi before relocating to Mumbai in February 2012 to pursue opportunities in film. She made her feature film debut with a cameo appearance as an item girl in the song "Mukhiya Ke Bungle Pe" in the Hindi action film Gurjar Aandolan (2014).

In 2015, Kapoor played the title role of Barkhaa in the Hindi romantic thriller Madmast Barkhaa, directed by Jaspal Singh. The following year, she appeared in the mystery thriller Wajah Tum Ho (2016), directed by Vishal Pandya, playing a supporting role alongside an ensemble cast that included Sharman Joshi, Gurmeet Choudhary, and Sana Khan.

== Controversy ==
In August 2012, Kapoor (then aged 21) filed a written complaint with the Versova police in Mumbai, accusing Pakistani ICC elite panel cricket umpire Asad Rauf of sexually exploiting her over several months under false promises of marriage. Kapoor alleged that the relationship began after meeting Rauf in Sri Lanka in March 2012, where he assured her of marriage despite disclosing his existing marriage and two children, claiming his religion permitted polygamy.

Rauf denied the allegations, conceding that photographs of the pair together were authentic but maintaining that Kapoor had posed with him as a fan and that no romantic or physical relationship had occurred. He characterised the accusations as an attempt by Kapoor to gain publicity. Rauf also claimed that Kapoor had pressured him to recommend her for the reality television show Bigg Boss, which she denied.

Following the filing of the complaint, Kapoor reported receiving threatening phone calls from unknown numbers in Mumbai and Delhi, urging her to withdraw the case and warning of harm to her and her family. The police investigated and recorded her statement. No charges were ultimately pressed, and Kapoor later withdrew her complaint. In May 2013, the ICC withdrew Rauf from the 2013 ICC Champions Trophy officiating panel.

== Music videos ==
- "Manka Manka" – Gurmukh Doabia

== Filmography ==
Year	Title	Role	Language	Notes
2007	Salaam-e-Ishq: A Tribute to Love		Hindi	Cameo appearance
2014	Gurjar Aandolan	Item girl	Hindi	Cameo in song "Mukhiya Ke Bungle Pe"
2015	Madmast Barkhaa	Barkhaa	Hindi	Lead role
2016	Wajah Tum Ho	Girl with Karan	Hindi	
