= Poison 2 =

2020 Indian web series

- Promotional poster
- Genre: Crime, Thriller, Action
- Created by: Vinayak Jain & Amit K Bhargava
- Written by: Rehan Khan
- Directed by: Vishal Pandya
- Creative director: Aseem Kalra
- Starring: Aftab Shivdasani; Raai Laxmi; Pooja Chopra; Rahul Dev; Vin Rana; Zain Imam; Asmita Sood; Gaurav Sharma; Taher Shabbir; Sakshi Pradhan
- Country of origin: India
- Original language: Hindi
- No. of seasons: 2
- No. of episodes: 11

Production
- Producers: Suzanna Ghai, Hemant Ruprell, Ranjeet Thakur, Vinayak Jain, Amit Bharghava
- Production locations: Mumbai, Maharashtra, India
- Cinematography: Ravi Walia
- Camera setup: Multi-camera
- Running time: 35 minutes
- Production companies: Panorama Entertainment & Bombay Media Works

Original release
- Network: ZEE5

Poison 2 is a 2020 Indian Hindi-language action crime thriller web series that is streaming on ZEE5. directed by Vishal Pandya and produced by Panorama Entertainmanet & Bombay Media Works. Poison 2 casts Aftab Shivdasani, Raai Laxmi, Pooja Chopra, Zain Imam and Vin Rana in lead roles. This is the first digital debut of Aftab Shivdasani and Raai Laxmi.

Its initial release date was 30 April 2020, but due to the COVID-19 pandemic it got postponed. The trailer of the series was released on 29 September 2020. and the series premiered on 16 October 2020 on ZEE5.

== Synopsis ==
Aditya, helped by Hina, is back to take revenge from the Josh team i.e. Sara, Harsh and Oscar. The series brings together a plot of revenge filled with deceit, passion, rage, and redemption as well as love, trust, friendship, truthfulness, honesty and camaraderie.

== Cast ==
- Aftab Shivdasani as Aditya Singh Rathore
- Raai Laxmi as Sara Matthews Oberoi
- Pooja Chopra as Isha Khanna
- Rahul Dev as Sikander Malik (Cameo)
- Vin Rana as Oscar Matthews
- Zain Imam as Harshvardhan Oberoi
- Asmita Sood as Hina Malik
- Karan Veer Mehra as Jaiveer Khanna (Cameo)
- Joy Sengupta as Home Secretary
- Pawan Chopra as Commissioner Arvind Bhonsle
- Deepak Chadha as Saurabh Khanna
- Gaurav Sharma as Pawan
- Taher Shabbir as Tony Secuira
- Sakshi Pradhan as Rani
- Faizal Rashid as Nandu
- Tanuj Virwani as Ranveer (Special Appearance)

== Episodes ==
No. overall	No. in season	Title	Directed by	Concept & Story	Original release date
1	"Dark Horse"	Vishal Pandya	Rehan Khan	16 October 2020	
Harsh and Oscar's horse is beaten at the last minute by Aditya. Sara accepts Aditya’s partnership deal which can help her win the racecourse. Oscar reaches Aditya’s house and finds drug Lord Tony there.
2	"Place Your Bets"	Vishal Pandya	Rehan Khan	16 October 2020	
Oscar and Tony set out to destroy Aditya. Isha leaves for Goa to solve a robbery case and is kidnapped from the airport.At the auction, Sara and Aditya lose the racecourse auction to Oscar.
3	"Joker In the Pack"	Vishal Pandya	Rehan Khan	16 October 2020	
Oscar asks Isha for a second chance. Harsh and Aditya get into a major fight over Sara. Oscar comes to Isha’s rescue at the mining office. At the dockyard, Aditya meets Tony to make a deal.
4	"Double Cross"	Vishal Pandya	Rehan Khan	16 October 2020	
Oscar informs Isha about Aditya's link to the diamond heist. Rani makes plan to steal gold car from Tony along with Pawan. Just when Sara meets Oscar to offer him a deal for the racecourse, Harsh comes and shoots at her.
5	"Good Friends Become Better Enemies"	Vishal Pandya	Rehan Khan	16 October 2020	
Aditya manages to save Sara.He is stopped and threatened by Rani over Tony's gold. Aditya and Tina kill Tony and his men.
6	"Once Bitten Twice Bitten"	Vishal Pandya	Rehan Khan	16 October 2020	
Harsh, Sara, and Oscar are now vying for each other’s blood. Nandu and Pawan start to suspect Rani when she doesn’t call.After a failed attempt at finding the locker at Sara’s home, Aditya reaches home where he is arrested by Isha.
7	"Deja Vu"	Vishal Pandya	Rehan Khan	16 October 2020	
The trio celebrates their victory. Isha makes Aditya escape and gives him an ultimatum of 24 hrs to prove Jaiveer’s innocence.Sara receives a government letter cancelling the race course lease.The trio returns home only to find Aditya waiting for them.
8	"Its Show Time"	Vishal Pandya	Rehan Khan	16 October 2020	
Aditya threatens to kill the trio. They call their mystery partner to eliminate Aditya.Oscar sits in a car and finds that Aditya is the driver.Tina takes Isha to a secluded place where Aditya throw Oscar's car down the cliff.
9	"Eye For An Eye"	Vishal Pandya	Rehan Khan	16 October 2020	
At Oscar’s funeral, Isha informs Harsh and Sara about the danger looming over their life. Tina is kidnapped. At the hotel, the Commissioner is waiting for Harsh, and is killed by Aditya. Harsh is arrested in this case by Isha.
10	"Check Mate"	Vishal Pandya	Rehan Khan	16 October 2020	
Isha now clearly sees through all the evidences and believes Aditya is innocent. Sara blackmails Aditya to free Harsh. Aditya helps Harsh escape and takes him to Sara who shoots both of them
11	"Payback is a Bitch"	Vishal Pandya	Rehan Khan	16 October 2020	
Sara is caught by Aditya and Isha. She is produced in court where Oscar takes all the blame on himself and Harsh as per his deal with Aditya. Aditya leaves Sara in a dilapidated house with no money, her life destroyed and his revenge completed.
