= Wajah Tum Ho =

2016 film by Vishal Pandya

- Theatrical release poster
- Directed by: Vishal Pandya
- Screenplay by: Vishal Pandya
- Story by: Sameer Arora
- Produced by: Bhushan Kumar; Krishan Kumar
- Starring: Sharman Joshi; Rajneesh Duggal; Sana Khan; Gurmeet Choudhary; Sherlyn Chopra
- Cinematography: Prakash Kutty
- Edited by: Manish More
- Music by: Score: Sunny and Inder Bawra; Songs: Mithoon; Abhijit Vaghani; Meet Bros; Gourav-Roshin
- Production company: T-Series Films
- Distributed by: AA Films
- Release date: 16 December 2016 (India)
- Running time: 136 minutes
- Country: India
- Language: Hindi
- Budget: ₹14 crore
- Box office: ₹13.57 crore

Wajah Tum Ho (transl. The reason is you) is a 2016 Indian Hindi-language erotic-crime mystery thriller film directed by Vishal Pandya. It features Sharman Joshi, Rajneesh Duggal, Sana Khan and Gurmeet Choudhary in lead roles. The film revolves around a murder committed on live television.

The production of the film began in February 2016 and principal photography commenced in May 2016 in Mumbai and was wrapped by October 2016. The trailer was released on 14 October 2016. The film was released on 16 December 2016.

== Plot ==
The film starts by showing a lodge where a policeman, Assistant Commissioner of Police Ramesh Sarnaik, is raping a young girl and then goes out to meet the girl's boyfriend. The policeman blackmailed the couple because he caught them with drugs and the girl made a deal with him to have sex in exchange for dropping all charges. After the policeman leaves, he gets into an accident. When he regains his consciousness, he finds himself chained where a computer genius hacks a TV channel owned by Rahul Oberoi and broadcasts the live murder of Sarnaik. ACP Kabir Deshmukh, in charge of the case, interrogates Rahul Oberoi wherein Siya, a lawyer, tries to defend his case. Sia has a boyfriend, Ranveer Bajaj, with whom she has an intimate relationship. He is a prosecution lawyer.

During the investigation, Kabir considers Karan Parekh, Rahul's old business partner, to be the suspect. He traces Karan's location to a hotel and goes to catch him. Upon reaching the hotel, he discovers that Karan is missing and is also being murdered on live television. Later, Kabir finds out that Rahul and Karan were involved in raping a girl named Rajni, an employee in Rahul's company. Kabir reveals this to Ranveer and Sia wherein Ranveer reveals an old man had saved Rajni from being raped and filed a complaint against Rahul and Karan. At that time, Rahul and Karan were prosecuted by Ranveer in the court. However, Ranveer lost the case as the old man had died in a fire explosion in his house and was the only witness for that case.

Now, it is clear that Rahul was not involved in any of the murders. Eventually, the police consider Rajni to be the suspect. Rahul now decides to flee India, but is not allowed to leave because his sugar level drastically increases. In no time, the police get to know that Rajni has gone missing and learn that Mac, Rajni's boyfriend who is also an employee in Rahul's company, is involved in the murders.

As Kabir learns that Rahul is to be hospitalized, he goes in search of Mac to save Rahul from being killed, but finds him missing. Mac takes Rahul to the same place where Sarnaik and Karan had been killed. Rahul finds himself tied and gets shocked when he sees Sia there. Sia reveals to Rahul that she is the one who killed Sarnaik and Karan; the old man who helped Rajni didn't die in an explosion but was murdered by Rahul, Karan and Sarnaik and was, in fact, Sia's father. She then attempts to kill Rahul by increasing his sugar level. During the process, Rahul reveals to Sia that it was of no use to kill them as the real killer is still alive. He tells her that Ranveer was bribed by him and Karan to save them and also planned the murder.

A heartbroken Sia leaves after Rahul dies. Soon, Kabir discovers Sia's identity as the killer. Sia takes Ranveer to the same place where the murders were committed and reveals to him the truth and also tells him to admit his crime. Knowing this, Ranveer refuses to do so but is being tricked by Sia as she had called the police and the whole statement was recorded and traced during her call.

This leads to a fight between them in which Kabir arrives and fights with Ranveer, who dies during the scuffle. Kabir resigns from his job, and knowing what he and the other murder victims had done, decides to not press any charges against Sia and sets her free.

== Cast ==
- Sharman Joshi as Assistant Commissioner of Police Kabir Deshmukh, an honest police officer in charge of the investigation
- Rajneesh Duggal as Rahul Oberoi, the owner of the biggest media channel, Global Times Network
- Sana Khan as Siya a.k.a. Ankita Sharma : Rahul's defence lawyer and Ranveer's Girlfriend
- Gurmeet Choudhary as Ranveer Bajaj : A Prosecutor and Siya's Boyfriend,
- Leena Kapoor as Karan's Girlfriend
- Himmanshoo A. Malhotra as Karan Parekh, Rahul's friend
- Deepen Gandhi as Head of Cyber Crime
- Rahul Rana as Inspector Gaitonde, Kabir's assistant
- Manisha Saxena as Rahul's Secretary
- Prarthana Behere as Rajni, a former employee in Rahul's company
- Sherlyn Chopra in an item number in the song "Dil Mein Chhuppa Loonga"
- Zareen Khan in an item number in the song "Maahi Ve"

== Production ==
Sana Khan, Sharman Joshi and Gurmeet Chaudhary were signed in by T-Series for a film to be directed by Vishal Pandya. Marathi actress Prarthana Behere was also signed for a pivotal role. Filming was wrapped up within five months, between May and October 2016.

The film borrows its title from a song in Hate Story 3, Pandya's previous collaboration with T-Series, which also starred Joshi.

The film was shot in Mumbai and Georgia. Zareen Khan did a special appearance for the song "Maahi Ve".

CBFC granted A certificate to Wajah Tum Ho.

== Soundtrack ==
The full soundtrack of the film was released on 4 November 2016 which includes nine songs, out of which three are recreated versions of yesteryear classics.

Three old Hindi film songs – "Pal Pal Dil Ke Paas" (1973 film Blackmail) starting Dharmendra, "Aise Na Mujhe Tum Dekho" (1977 film Darling Darling) and "Maahi Ve" (2002 film Kaante) were used in Wajah Tum Ho. Arijit Singh publicly accused music producer and composer Abhijit Vaghani for retuning his voice in the film. Tulsi Kumar sings for four tracks in Wajah Tum Ho. The music rights of the film are acquired by T-Series.

Track listing
No.	Title	Lyrics	Music	Singer(s)	Length
1.	"Wajah Tum Ho"	Manoj Muntashir	Mithoon	Mithoon, Altamash Faridi, Tulsi Kumar	4:55
2.	"Dil Ke Paas"	Rajendra Krishna	Abhijit Vaghani, Kalyanji-Anandji	Arijit Singh, Tulsi Kumar, Neuman Pinto	4:31
3.	"Dil Mein Chupa Loonga"	Kumaar	Meet Bros	Armaan Malik, Tulsi Kumar, Meet Bros	5:31
4.	"Maahi Ve"	Kumaar	Gourov Roshin	Neha Kakkar, Amit Gupta	6:05
5.	"Wajah Tum Ho" (Solo)	Manoj Muntashir	Mithoon	Mithoon	4:55
6.	"Dil Ke Paas" (Unplugged)	Rajendra Krishna	Abhijit Vaghani	Armaan Malik, Shamita Bhatkat	4:56
7.	"Wajah Tum Ho" (Lounge Version)	Manoj Muntashir	Mithoon	Mithoon, Altamash Faridi	5:09
8.	"Dil Ke Paas" (Indian Version)	Rajendra Krishna	Abhijit Vaghani, Kalyanji-Anandji	Arijit Singh, Tulsi Kumar	4:23
9.	"Maahi Ve" (Unplugged)	Kumaar	Gourov Roshin	Neha Kakkar	4:24
10.	"Wajah Tum Ho" (Mashup)			DJ Kiran Kamath	3:33
11.	"Dil Ke Paas" (Indian Version by Arijit Singh)	Rajendra Krishna	Abhijit Vaghani, Kalyanji-Anandji	Arijit Singh	4:24
Total length:					44:50

== Box office ==
The film was commercially unsuccessful, grossing approximately ₹13.57 crore worldwide against a budget of ₹14 crore.
