= Jeevan Ya Bheema Con? =

2026 Indian Hindi-language crime comedy film

- Directed by: Abhishek Dogra
- Screenplay by: Mukta Bhatt; Vivek Verma
- Produced by: Anshu Mishra
- Starring: Arshad Warsi; Sanjeeda Sheikh; Vijay Raaz; Pooja Chopra; Brijendra Kala
- Cinematography: Sarthak Johar
- Edited by: Sandeep Kurup
- Production company: Starbeam Ventures
- Distributed by: Cinépolis
- Release date: 4 September 2026
- Running time: 120 minutes
- Country: India
- Language: Hindi

Jeevan Ya Bheema Con? is an 2026 Indian Hindi-language crime comedy thriller film directed by Abhishek Dogra and produced by Anshu Mishra. The film stars Arshad Warsi in a dual role as Jeevan and Bheema, alongside Sanjeeda Sheikh, Vijay Raaz, Pooja Chopra and Brijendra Kala. It marks Warsi's first performance in a double role.

The film is scheduled for a worldwide theatrical release on 4 September 2026. The film was previously titled Jeevan Bheema Yojana it was changed to the present title three days before the release.

== Premise ==
Jeevan is a debt-ridden man struggling with financial problems. His circumstances change when he encounters Bheema, a man who looks identical to him but is connected to a dangerous criminal world. Jeevan and his wife Yojana devise a plan involving Bheema's identity and a life insurance claim. Their scheme becomes increasingly complicated after they discover Bheema's connection to diamond smuggling and criminals.

== Cast ==
- Arshad Warsi in a dual role as:
  - Jeevan
  - Bheema
- Sanjeeda Sheikh as Yojana
- Vijay Raaz as Vinayak
- Pooja Chopra as Yashika
- Brijendra Kala as Mannu
- Atul Parchure as Sachin Agarkar
- Madhu Anand Chandhock
- Jaywant Wadkar
- Dimple Srivastava

== Production ==
=== Development ===
Jeevan Bheema Yojana was directed by Abhishek Dogra, whose previous films include Dolly Ki Doli and FryDay. The screenplay was written by Mukta Bhatt and Vivek Verma.

The film was produced by Anshu Mishra under Starbeam Ventures Limited. Nitin Khanna, Raman Raheja and Afsana Kherani are credited as co-producers.

Sarthak Johar served as cinematographer and Sandeep Kurup as editor.

=== Casting ===
Arshad Warsi was cast as the two central characters, Jeevan and Bheema, marking the first double role of his film career. The characters are lookalikes with contrasting backgrounds: Jeevan is portrayed as a financially troubled common man, while Bheema has connections to the criminal world.

The film received media coverage during its production phase several years before its scheduled release. Filmfare reported that Warsi would portray the contrasting characters Jeevan and Bheema, with Vijay Raaz, Sanjeeda Sheikh, Pooja Chopra and Brijendra Kala also part of the cast.

Sanjeeda Sheikh was cast as Jeevan's wife Yojana, while Vijay Raaz plays Vinayak. The supporting cast includes Pooja Chopra, Brijendra Kala and the late Atul Parchure.

By June 2026, principal photography had been completed and the film had entered post-production.

== Marketing ==
The first look of the film was released in June 2026, revealing Warsi's dual characters and the film's crime-comedy premise.

The official trailer was released on 26 August 2026. It introduced Warsi in the contrasting roles of Jeevan and Bheema and outlined the film's central conflict involving mistaken identities, crime and dark humour.

== Release ==
The film was initially announced for a theatrical release on 28 August 2026. Its release was subsequently moved by one week to 4 September 2026.

== Reception ==
Sreeju Sudhakaran of Rediff.com gave it 1 star out of and said that "Warsi, Vijay Raaz and Brijendra Kala have all the comic chops, but Jeevan Ya Bheema Con? cannot squeeze even a single laugh out of them." Nandini Ramnath of Scroll.in writes in her review that "Threats are made; guns are waved; farts are discharged. The film's sound designer hopefully had fun with the audio effects, because nobody else does." Rishabh Suri of Hindustan Times 2.5 stars out of 5 and said that "Overall, Jeevan Ya Bheema Con? is hardly a classic, but it knows that the easiest way to keep a comedy alive is to keep moving. The writing runs out of steam in places, and some gags could have been sent into early retirement, but the actors ensure that the film remains largely watchable."
