= Pooja Chopra =

Indian actress and model (born 1986)

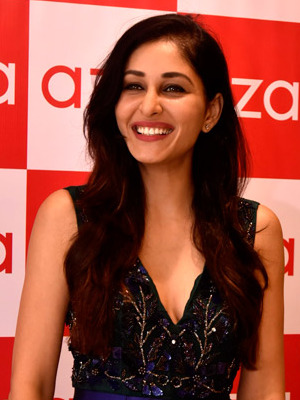
- Chopra in 2018
- Born: Pooja Chopra; 3 May 1986 (age 40); Calcutta (now Kolkata), West Bengal, India
- Education: Ness Wadia College of Commerce, Pune
- Occupation: Actress
- Beauty pageant titleholder
- Title: Femina Miss India World 2009
- Years active: 2008–present
- Major competitions: Femina Miss India World 2009 (Winner); Miss World 2009 (Top 16) (Beauty with a Purpose)

Pooja Chopra (born 3 May 1986) is an Indian actress and beauty pageant titleholder who primarily works in Hindi films. She won the title of Femina Miss India World 2009 and represented India at Miss World 2009 pageant where, she became the first Indian to win the "Beauty with a Purpose" title. Chopra made her lead film debut with Commando: A One Man Army (2023) and has since appeared in Aiyaary (2018), Jahaan Chaar Yaar (2022), Khakee: The Bengal Chapter (2025) and Jeevan Ya Bheema Con? (2026).

== Early life ==
Chopra was born in Calcutta (now Kolkata), West Bengal. She stated was abandoned by her father at birth since he wanted a boy. Chopra's mother, Neera had to leave her marital home since she refused to admit Pooja to an orphanage in Kolkata, and she moved to Mumbai with both kids. She worked and brought up both girls by herself.

== Pageantry ==
Chopra was crowned with the Femina Miss India East title on 17 February 2009, in Kolkata. She also won Miss Perfect 10, Miss Catwalk, Miss Beautiful Smile, Best Body, and Nakshatra Miss Sparkling Beauty, thus gaining direct entry into the top ten finalists of the Femina Miss India 2009. On 5 April 2009, she was crowned the Femina Miss India-World 2009.

Chopra sprained her ankle while running down a flight of stairs one week prior to the Miss World Final, which was scheduled to take place on 12 December 2009; still, she participated in the competition and earned a positive response from the public. Doctors advised 3 weeks of complete bed-rest, but she continued with the competition. She finished as one of the top 16 finalists at the Miss World 2009.

== Acting career ==
Chopra in 2014

Chopra made her acting debut in the 2011 Tamil film Ponnar Shankar, playing the role of Princess Muthaayi, opposite Prashanth Thiagarajan. She then had minor roles in Madhur Bhandarkar's films Fashion and Heroine.

Chopra made her lead Hindi film debut with Vipul Shah's Commando: A One Man Army opposite Vidyut Jammwal. Reviewing the film, Taran Adarsh noted, "Pooja couldn't have asked for a better launch pad. She's photogenic, but most significantly, comes across as a poised and self-assured actress." Meena Iyer stated, "Pooja is super-confident in her film debut and a welcome addition to Bollywood's heroines". The film was a commercial success.

In 2016, Chopra first appeared in the film Yea Toh Two Much Ho Gaya. She next starred in Neeraj Pandey's short film Ouch, a dramatic love story. Chopra played an intelligence officer in the 2018 film Aiyaary. The film failed at the box office. In 2020, Chopra made her web debut with Poison 2.

Chopra played a lead in the 2021 film Babloo Bachelor opposite Sharman Joshi. In 2022, she played one of the lead in the film Jahaan Chaar Yaar. Anna MM Vetticad stated, "Pooja along with the other three leads, with her proven talent elevate her scenes above the evident failings of this film."

Chopra played a doctor and a police officer's wife in the series Khakee: The Bengal Chapter opposite Jeet. The series received mixed to positive response. In 2026, Chopra played a landlord in Jeevan Ya Bheema Con?. Rishab Suri felt she gave a "decent" performance.

== Philanthropy and other work ==
Chopra has given a TED Talk on the subject of "Write your own destiny : Journey of a once abandoned girl child". The talk happened in Krupanidhi Institution of Engineering, Bangalore. Chopra has been a celebrity endorser for brands such as Tata Docomo, Bajaj Allainz, Richfeel, Body and Soul, Roots Comb, Evolve Med Spa, and Juvederm Voluma.

On 12 December 2009, she won the "Beauty With a Purpose" title at Miss World 2009 based on her charitable work in the India "Nanhi Kali" project. She won US$10,000 for her project, which she donated to the NGO which helps small girls fight poverty.

Considering their shared interest in fitness, Pooja chopra, along with Akshay Kumar, launched the Asian Heart Institute Initiative "Happy Heart India" campaign for underprivileged children in 2018. Chopra was also invited by the BMC to lead the campaign #EkChammachKam alongside Farhan Akhtar to spread awareness about non-communicable diseases. Post Pulwama attack in 2019, Pooja Chopra donated part of her Aiyaary earnings to families of Martyred Soldiers.

== Filmography ==
Key
†	Denotes films that have not yet been released

=== Films ===
Year	Title	Role	Notes	Ref.
2008	Fashion	Herself	Special appearance	
2011	Ponnar Shankar	Princess Muthaayi	Tamil film	
2012	Heroine	Shaheen Khan	Special appearance	
2012	The World Before Her	Herself	English Documentary film	
2013	Commando: A One Man Army	Simrit Kaur		
2016	Yea Toh Two Much Ho Gayaa	Meena		
2016	Ouch	Priya	Short film	
2018	Aiyaary	Captain Maya Semwal		
2021	Babloo Bachelor	Avantika		
2022	Jahaan Chaar Yaar	Sakina		
2026	Jeevan Ya Bheema Con?	Yashika		

=== Web series ===
Year	Title	Role	Notes	Ref.
2020	Poison 2	Isha Khanna		
2025	Khakee: The Bengal Chapter	Dr. Khushi Maitra		

Awards and achievements
Preceded by Parvathy Omanakuttan	Femina Miss India World; 2009	Succeeded by Manasvi Mamgai
Preceded by (Trinidad and Tobago) Gabrielle Walcott	Miss World Beauty with a Purpose; 2009	Succeeded by (Kenya) Natasha Metto
