= Ferrous (film) =

- Directed by: Shaurya Singh
- Written by: Shaurya Singh
- Screenplay by: Shaurya Singh
- Produced by: Amrit Sinha; Shaurya Singh
- Starring: Vijay Raaz; Zakir Hussain; Gopal K Singh; Bikramjeet Kanwarpal; Pankaj Jha; Maruf khan
- Cinematography: Hemant Jaiswal
- Edited by: Upendra Pankaj
- Music by: Saurabh Verma
- Production company: Silver Rain Pictures / Tanay Films International
- Release date: 2018
- Running time: 120 minutes
- Country: India
- Language: Hindi

Ferrous is an Indian crime drama feature film written, directed and produced by writer/director Shaurya Singh under his banner Silver Rain Pictures in collaboration with Amrit Sinha of Tanay Films International. Ferrous was premiered at RTF 2018, an International Film Festival held at Lagos, Nigeria in July 2018, in front of a packed international audience where it was judged Best Foreign Film. The film was later adapted to become a series and premiered on OTT platform Ullu in Feb 2022.

== Plot ==
Set in the current day Mumbai, the film is a crime drama. Ferrous is a non-linear screenplay film in which rather than pushing and pulling the film in past and present, the whole structure of the film is non-linear. The audience has to perceive the film and join the dots of the story in order to comprehend the complete set of events in sequential order.

== Cast ==
- Vijay Raaz as The Cleaner
- Zakir Hussain as Minister Madhyadheesh
- Bikramjeet Kanwarpal as Inspector Jagdeesh Sinchwal
- Gopal K Singh as Madan
- Pankaj Jha as Matin Khan
- Manish Khanna as The Sniper
- Myra Singh as Sana
- Diaansh Sharma as Ajay
- Maruf Khan as Vishambhar (Minister's Secretary)

== Production ==
The pre-production of the film was started in October 2017 and the production completed in March 2018. The film is extensively shot in Mumbai.

== Accolades ==
Award	Category	Recipients	Result	References
RTF - 2018, Lagos, Nigeria	Best Foreign Film	Ferrous	Won	
RTF - 2018, Lagos, Nigeria	Best Screenplay	Ferrous	Nominated	
9th Jagran Film Festival 2018, India	Official Selection - Indian Showcase	Ferrous	-	-
7th Delhi International Film Festival, 2018	Official Selection - In Competition	Ferrous	-	-
Koshi Film Festival, Saharsa, Bihar	Best Film	Ferrous	Won	
Koshi Film Festival, Saharsa, Bihar	Best Actor - Female	Myra Singh	Won	-
Jharkhand International Film Festival, Ranchi, Jharkhand, 2019	Official Selection - In Competition	Ferrous	-	
LIFFT World Cine Fest 2019, Lonavala, Maharastra	Official Selection	Ferrous	-	
