= Jahaan Chaar Yaar =

2022 Indian film by Kamal Pandey

- Directed by: Kamal Pandey
- Written by: Kamal Pandey
- Produced by: Vinod Bachchan
- Starring: Swara Bhaskar; Meher Vij; Pooja Chopra; Shikha Talsania
- Cinematography: Sethu Sriram
- Edited by: Ballu Saluja
- Music by: Anand Raj Anand; Rashid Khan
- Production company: Soundrya Productions
- Distributed by: Pen Marudhar
- Release date: 16 September 2022
- Country: India
- Language: Hindi

Jahaan Chaar Yaar is a 2022 Indian Hindi-language female buddy comedy-drama film written and directed by Kamal Pandey and produced by Vinod Bachchan. The film stars Swara Bhaskar, Meher Vij, Shikha Talsania and Pooja Chopra. The film received negative reviews from critics and viewers and became a box-office failure.

== Plot Summary ==
Four married friends — Shivangi, Neha, Mansi, and Sakina — travel to Goa for a vacation that unexpectedly turns into a criminal investigation, jeopardizing their plans for a carefree getaway. As the case unfolds, each woman confronts the unhappiness in her marriage, though not all are willing to admit it to themselves or others. What begins as a leisure trip gradually becomes a journey of self-discovery and emotional reckoning within their marriages.

== Cast ==
- Swara Bhaskar as Shivangi
- Meher Vij as Mansi
- Pooja Chopra as Sakina
- Shikha Talsania as Neha
- Girish Kulkarni as Madhukar Rane
- Nirbhay Wadhwa
- Vibha Chibber as Shivangi's Mother-in-law
- Manish Chaudhari DCP Mohit

== Production ==
The film was officially announced by Swara Bhaskar in 2021 and started shooting in Lucknow. Filming started in Goa for second schedule and halted for COVID-19 infection. Filming finished on 20 September 2021.

== Soundtrack ==
Jahan Chaar Yaar

Soundtrack album by Anand Raj Anand, Sanjeev Chaturvedi and Rashid Khan
- Recorded: 2021–2022
- Genre: Feature film soundtrack
- Language: Hindi
- Label: Times Music

The music of the film is composed by Anand Raj Anand, Sanjeev Chaturvedi and Rashid Khan . The first song "What The Luck" Featuring Mika Singh was released on 29 August 2022.

No.	Title	Lyrics	Music	Singer(s)	Length
1.	"What The Luck"	Sanjeev Chaturvedi	Sanjeev Chaturvedi	Mika Singh
Total length:					3:13

== Reception ==
Shubhra Gupta of The Indian Express gave 2.5 stars out of 5 and stated that "A quick, illicit getaway for the four pals turns into a light-hearted caper which includes a murder, a bunch of kooky cops, and intrigue." Anuj Kumar of The Hindu observed that "Swara Bhasker aces the part of a housewife who has been reduced to a maid by her husband and in-laws, but the well-intentioned film fails to do justice to its strong female cast." Archika Khurana of The Times of India gave 1.5 stars out of 5 and said that "The concept of friends travelling together to have some thrill in life is not novel, but given that the film focusses on desi naaris and their pakki dostis, a lot of entertainment was expected, but it falls short in every way."

Anna MM Vetticad of Firstpost commented that "Swara Bhasker, Shikha Talsania, Meher Vij and Pooja Chopra are proven talents who elevate their scenes above the evident failings of this film." Devesh Sharma of Filmfare gave 3 stars out of 6 and said that "Jahaan Chaar Yaar is a film with strong feminist vibes and carries good performances, it does falter on execution, especially in the second half. The film is a mixed bag for sure, and let’s hope its message finds an audience." Sonil Dedhia of News 18 rated it 3/5 stars and said that "If you go in without any expectations, Jahaan Chaar Yaar is a decent attempt and would pass muster."

Sukanya Verma of rediff.com rated it 1.5/5 stars and call it a "A silly flick that wants to say something meaningful in the support of women's empowerment yet can't resist being flippant at every given opportunity." Agnivo Niyogi of The Telegraph observed that "What the film misses is a mature handling of the issues. Director Kamal Pandey walks on the treaded path, denying us a fresh perspective on problems we are all familiar with." Pallabi Dey of OTT Play rated it 1.5/5 stars and said that "The script of Jahaan Chaar Yaar is—it pains me to say this—utterly horrendous."
