= Hate Story 4 =

2018 Indian film by Vishal Pandya

- Theatrical release poster
- Directed by: Vishal Pandya
- Written by: Milap Zaveri (dialogues)
- Screenplay by: Sammeer Arora; Vishal Pandya
- Story by: Sammeer Arora
- Produced by: Bhushan Kumar; Krishan Kumar
- Starring: Urvashi Rautela; Vivan Bhatena; Karan Wahi; Ihana Dhillon; Gulshan Grover; Tia Bajpai; Shaad Randhawa
- Cinematography: Sunita Radia
- Edited by: Manish More
- Music by: Tanishk Bagchi; Himesh Reshammiya; Arko Pravo Mukherjee; Mithoon; Tony Kakkar; Baman-Chand
- Production companies: T-Series Films; Super T Films UK Ltd.
- Distributed by: AA Films
- Release date: 9 March 2018
- Running time: 140 minutes
- Country: India
- Language: Hindi
- Budget: ₹21 crore
- Box office: ₹26.60 crore

Hate Story 4 (styled as Hate Story IV) is a 2018 Indian Hindi-language erotic thriller film directed by Vishal Pandya and written by Sammeer Arora. The film features Urvashi Rautela, Karan Wahi and Vivan Bhatena in the lead roles. The film marks the Bollywood debut of Punjabi film actress Ihana Dhillon. It is the fourth installment in the Hate Story film series and it received negative response from critics. The film was commercially unsuccessful at the box office.

== Plot ==
The movie starts with Tasha confronting Aryan about their intimate photo, which had been sent to her phone anonymously. Aryan's girlfriend Rishma appears with a gun to kill him. In a tussle, Rishma is shot and dies.

The story moves back, introducing Aryan and Rajveer, the sons of London based billionaire and politician Vikram Khurana. Looking for a fresh face to represent their company, Rajveer goes to a bar, where he is smitten by Tasha. He woos Tasha by promising her to make her a star and hires her for their company. In an attempt to lure her into bed, he pays some goons to attack her so he can swoop in as the hero. As he is paying the goons, someone takes a picture of the transaction. Aryan too is captivated by Tasha's beauty and is able to get her drunk at a party. That night, he sleeps with her, and she wakes up regretting the event. This is when their photo is sent to her phone.

In the present, Aryan convinces Tasha to quietly dispose of Rishma's body. They dump the body in a river. Tasha then reveals to the audience that she herself is the person behind all of this – the mastermind behind all the events thus far. She had known that Rajveer had hired goons and had bribed them as well; she also spiked Aryan's drink at the party, and after he passed out, she took photos with him in compromising positions to make it look like they slept together. She then sent the photos to Rishma.

Tasha continues to avoid Rajveer, making him desperate for her. Playing the brothers against each other, she publicly rejects Rajveer's proposal, telling him that Aryan told her about how Rajveer lures girls into bed and then leaves them. She also reveals that she and Aryan are involved. Aryan receives a video clip of him dumping Rishma's body.

Vikram is baffled by Rajveer's behaviour when he receives the compromising picture of Aryan and Tasha and the video of Aryan dumping a dead body. He gets a threatening call in which the blackmailer (Tasha) demands that his sons confess to the crime they committed two years ago in India. It is revealed that two years ago, Rajveer tried to force a girl named Bhavna into his car. When a passerby named Ashwin came to help her, Aryan shot him. Overcome by rage, Rajveer shot him multiple times, killing him. In the hospital, Ashwin is declared dead as his sister Natasha (Tasha) and his mother arrive. Bhavna's family is threatened by Vikram to keep silent, with Natasha vowing to avenge her brother's murder.

Presently, Rajveer, heartbroken, is unable to overcome the pain when he is informed that Aryan is the one who kidnapped his love. He confronts Aryan and threatens to reveal that Aryan killed Rishma. In the struggle to stop him, Aryan ends up killing Rajveer, then dumps him in a grave as suggested by Tasha. Rajveer's ex Monica discovers the truth about Tasha and tells Aryan. Aryan tries to kill Tasha but she successfully knocks him out and injures herself, acting innocent in front of the police, who then arrest Aryan.

In the ending credits, Tasha blames Vikram for being a bad father. At Natasha's home, Rishma, revealed to be alive, stands in front of Ashwin's picture; she had been his fiancé when he was alive.

== Cast ==
- Urvashi Rautela as Natasha "Tasha" Choudhary
- Karan Wahi as Rajveer Khurana
- Vivan Bhatena as Aryan Khurana
- Ihana Dhillon as Rishma
- Gulshan Grover as Vikram Khurana MP, also a business tycoon
- Tia Bajpai as Bhavna Shrivastav (special appearance)
- Shaad Randhawa as Ashwin Choudhary, Natasha's elder brother (special appearance)
- Shubhangi Latkar as Natasha and Ashwin's mother
- James Abbey as ACP, Mumbai Police
- Rita Siddiqui as Monica

== Production ==
The pre-production of the film began in June 2017. Principal photography commenced in London from September 2017 and concluded on 11 November 2017. The official trailer was launched on 26 January 2018 by T-Series.

== Soundtrack ==
Hate Story 4

Soundtrack album by Tanishk Bagchi, Himesh Reshammiya, Arko Pravo Mukherjee, Mithoon, Tony Kakkar and Baman-Chand
- Released: 23 February 2018
- Genre: Feature film soundtrack
- Length: 36:42
- Language: Hindi
- Label: T-Series
External audio
- Audio Jukebox on YouTube

Tanishk Bagchi chronology
| Dil Juunglee (2018) | Hate Story 4 (2018) | Raid (2018) |

Arko Pravo Mukherjee chronology
| Shaadi Mein Zaroor Aana (2017) | Hate Story 4 (2018) | Baaghi 2 (2018) |

Mithoon chronology
| Aksar 2 (2017) | Hate Story 4 (2018) | Baaghi 2 (2018) |

Tony Kakkar chronology
| One Night Stand (2016) | Hate Story 4 (2018) |

Boman chronology
| Hate Story 3 (2015) | Hate Story 4 (2018) |

Singles from Hate Story 4
- 1. "Aashiq Banaya Aapne (Re-make)" Released: 31 January 2018; 2. "Boond Boond" Released: 7 February 2018; 3. "Tum Mere Ho" Released: 13 February 2018; 4. "Mohabbat Nasha Hai" Released: 17 February 2018; 5. "Badnamiyaan" Released: 21 February 2018; 6. "Naam Hai Mera" Released: 23 February 2018

The music for the film's soundtrack album was composed by Tanishk Bagchi, Arko Pravo Mukherjee, Mithoon, Tony Kakkar and Baman-Chand. Lyrics were penned by Manoj Muntashir, Kumaar, Rashmi Virag and Shabbir Ahmed. The background score is composed by Sunny and Inder Bawra. The songs featured in the film were sung by Jubin Nautiyal, Neha Kakkar, Neeti Mohan, Armaan Malik, Tony Kakkar, Himesh Reshammiya, Amrita Singh and Sukriti Kakar.

The first song, "Aashiq Banaya Aapne" from the 2005 film of the same title, originally composed by Reshammiya, was recreated for this film in the voices of Neha Kakkar and Reshammiya and was released on 31 January 2018. The second song, "Boond Boond", sung by Nautiyal and Neeti Mohan, was released on 7 February 2018. This was the second collaboration of Arko Pravo Mukherjee and Nautiyal after "Meherbani" in The Shaukeens. The third song released was "Tum Mere Ho", sung by Nautiyal and Amrita Singh and released on 13 February 2018. This was the first collaboration between Mithoon and Nautiyal following Baaghi 2. It was also the first Bollywood song for Amrita. The fourth song to be released was "Mohabbat Nasha Hai", sung by Tony Kakkar and Neha Kakkar and released on 17 February 2018. There is also a solo version of the song sung by Tony Kakkar. The fifth song was "Badnaamiyan", sung by Armaan Malik and released on 21 February 2018. This was the second collaboration of Armaan Malik and Baman-Chand after "Wajah Tum Ho" from Hate Story 3. There is also a female version of the song sung by Sukriti Kakar. The sixth and last song, "Naam Hai Mera", originally composed by Himesh Reshammiya, was also recreated for this film and sung by Neeti Mohan. It was released on 23 February 2018.

The soundtrack of the film was released by T-Series on 23 February 2018; it includes eight songs.

Track listing
| No. | Title | Lyrics | Music | Singer(s) | Length |
|---|---|---|---|---|---|
| 1. | "Aashiq Banaya Aapne (Re-make)" | Manoj Muntashir | Tanishk Bagchi | Neha Kakkar, Himesh Reshammiya | 3:42 |
| 2. | "Boond Boond" | Manoj Muntashir | Arko Pravo Mukherjee | Jubin Nautiyal, Neeti Mohan | 4:33 |
| 3. | "Tum Mere Ho" | Manoj Muntashir | Mithoon | Jubin Nautiyal, Amrita Singh | 4:52 |
| 4. | "Badnaamiyan" | Rashmi Virag | Baman-Chand | Armaan Malik | 5:09 |
| 5. | "Naam Hai Mera" | Shabbir Ahmed | Tanishk Bagchi | Neeti Mohan | 3:12 |
| 6. | "Mohabbat Nasha Hai" (Duet) | Kumaar | Tony Kakkar | Tony Kakkar, Neha Kakkar | 5:15 |
| 7. | "Mohabbat Nasha Hai" | Kumaar | Tony Kakkar | Tony Kakkar | 5:15 |
| 8. | "Badnaamiyan" (Female) | Rashmi Virag | Baman-Chand | Sukriti Kakar | 4:44 |
| Total length: | | | | | 36:42 |
