= Hate Story 2 =

2014 film by Vishal Pandya

- Theatrical release poster
- Directed by: Vishal Pandya
- Written by: Girish Dhamija (dialogues)
- Screenplay by: Madhuri Banerjee
- Produced by: Bhushan Kumar; Krishan Kumar
- Starring: Sushant Singh; Surveen Chawla; Jay Bhanushali; Siddharth Kher
- Cinematography: Kedar Gaikwad
- Edited by: Kuldip Mehan
- Music by: Songs: Arko; Meet Bros Anjjan; Rashid Khan; Mithoon; Sumit Sethi; Prince; Score: Sunny and Inder Bawra
- Production company: T-Series Films
- Distributed by: T-Series Films; AA Films
- Release date: July 18, 2014
- Running time: 130 minutes
- Country: India
- Language: Hindi
- Budget: ₹15 crore
- Box office: ₹31.07 crore

Hate Story 2 is a 2014 Indian Hindi-language erotic thriller film directed by Vishal Pandya. Produced by T-Series Films, it stars Sushant Singh, Surveen Chawla and Jay Bhanushali in pivotal roles. It is the sequel to the 2012 sleeper hit Hate Story. The film released on 18 July 2014. It is the second installment of the Hate Story film series. It was a critical and commercial success at the box office.

== Plot ==
The film begins with an elderly man entering a graveyard to lay flowers on a grave. He hears the noise of someone struggling in a coffin nearby. To his utmost surprise, he discovers a girl buried alive in the coffin. He takes the girl to the hospital, where Police Inspector Anton Varghese tells the doctor to let him know as soon as she regains consciousness. The officer guarding the girl's room calls an anonymous person, informing him that the girl is alive. He tries to smother her, but she is able to alert the nurse. Inspector Anton is called, but the girl manages to escape from the hospital. She goes to her house, starts packing her bags, but suddenly suffers a seizure.

The girl is revealed to be Sonika, the mistress of a powerful and influential political leader, Mandar Mhatre. Sonika is a photography student who is kept isolated and tortured by Mandar. She reluctantly finds comfort in her college friend, Akshay Bedi, who secretly loves her. They fall in love, but Sonika is helpless since she can't tell Akshay about her situation with Mandar. Akshay gets to know the truth and comforts her. They decide to run away to be together. Sonika is happy and becomes hopeful of having a free life. Mandar discovers that she has eloped with her lover.

Mandar and his men reach Akshay's house and attack him. Sonika begs him to leave Akshay alone, but they kill him by tying him to a rope and throwing him into a lake in a car. Mandar also buries Sonika alive in a coffin. After she is rescued, she vows to exact vengeance on Mandar. She first kills the police officer who tried to kill her. Then she writes a journal describing her torture. She dives into the same lake and puts it in the car. She then kills one of the three men who were involved in killing Akshay. After that, she informs Inspector Anton about Akshay's dead body. However, Mandar makes it look like Sonika killed Akshay. Sonika then kills another one of Mandar's men involved in Akshay's death. Sonika teams up with Mandar's rival to get to the third man who helped kill Akshay, but Mandar kills him.

It is revealed that his rival had become a partner after Mandar offered to share his seats with him in the election. Mandar implicates Sonika in the murders, and the police arrest her. However, she manages to escape with Anton's help. Then Sonika kills Mandar with Mandar's wife's help, who discovers her husband's true face. The next day, Anton provides a locked house for Sonika to live in, giving her the new identity of 'Veronica', knowing that no one would even contemplate that a fugitive is hiding in a safe house provided by the very officer leading the manhunt to find her.

== Cast ==
- Surveen Chawla as Sonika Prasad
- Jay Bhanushali as Akshay Bedi
- Sushant Singh as Mandar Mhatre
- Siddharth Kher as Inspector Anton Varghese
- Rajesh Khera as Atul Mhatre
- Neha Kaul as Mandar Mhatre's Wife and Widow
- Meet Arora as sub-inspector Vikram Gaekward
- Sunny Leone as item number "Pink Lips"

== Production and promotion ==
Both lead actors learnt scuba diving for the film. Jasmin Oza did choreography for Hate Story 2. The trailer crossed 7 million views within 10 days of its release. Actress Sunny Leone was approached to perform an item song "Pink Lips".

The Indian censor boards objected to the sex scenes airing as part of the trailer and music video on TV channels, therefore the producers of the film edited certain portions. Comedian Kapil Sharma refused to promote the film on the grounds that he did not want to expose an erotic thriller to a family audience watching his TV show, Comedy Nights with Kapil.

== Reception ==
Meena Iyer of The Times of India gave the film 2.5 stars out of 5 and wrote, "The proceedings on screen lack tempo that is needed for an erotic thriller." Sweta Kaushal of the Hindustan Times gave the film 1.0 stars out of 5 and wrote, "With a totally predictable story line and extremely illogical twists and turns, Hate Story 2 fails to entertain."

== Box office ==
The film was a commercial success with a nett gross of ₹22.9 crore and was declared "Average" by the Box Office India.

== Soundtrack ==
Hate Story 2

Soundtrack album by Arko, Rashid Khan, Meet Bros Anjjan & Mithoon
- Released: 24 June 2014
- Genre: Feature film soundtrack
- Length: 37:44
- Language: Hindi
- Label: T-Series
External audio
- Audio Jukebox on YouTube

The first song "Aaj Phir" is recreated song from 1988 film Dayavan. The item song, "Pink Lips", which was pictured Sunny Leone, is a promotional track for the film and became Bollywood full-fledged debut for Punjabi singer and actress Khushboo Grewal.

No.	Title	Lyrics	Music	Singer(s)	Length
1.	"Aaj Phir"	Arko	Arko	Arijit Singh, Arko, Samira Koppikar	4:21
2.	"Pink Lips"	Kumaar	Meet Bros Anjjan	Meet Bros Anjjan and Khushboo Grewal	3:29
3.	"Kabhi Aayine Pe"	Tanveer Ghazi	Rashid Khan	K.K.	5:54
4.	"Hai Dil Ye Mera"	Mithoon	Mithoon	Arijit Singh	4:58
5.	"Aaj Phir" (Remix)	Arko	Arko	Arijit Singh, Arko, Samira Koppikar	3:56
6.	"Pink Lips" (Remix)	Kumaar	Meet Bros Anjjan, Sumit Sethi and Prince	Meet Bros Anjjan & Khushboo Grewal	3:52
7.	"Kabhi Aayine" (Remix)	Tanveer Ghazi	Rashid Khan	K.K.	4:45
8.	"Hai Dil Ye Mera" (Remix)	Mithoon	Mithoon	Arijit Singh	5:41
