= Junooniyat =

2016 Indian film by Vivek Agnihotri

- Theatrical release poster
- Directed by: Vivek Agnihotri
- Screenplay by: Priti Singh; Vivek Agnihotri
- Story by: Priti Singh
- Produced by: Bhushan Kumar; Krishan Kumar
- Starring: Pulkit Samrat; Yami Gautam
- Cinematography: Attar Singh Saini
- Edited by: Antara Lahiri
- Music by: Ankit Tiwari; Meet Bros; Jeet Gannguli
- Production company: T-Series Films
- Distributed by: Pooja Entertainment
- Release date: 24 June 2016
- Running time: 130 minutes
- Country: India
- Language: Hindi
- Box office: est.₹41.0 million (US$430,000)

Junooniyat (transl. Obsession) is a 2016 Indian Hindi-language romantic drama film written and directed by Vivek Agnihotri. Produced by Bhushan Kumar under his T-Series banner, it stars Pulkit Samrat and Yami Gautam. This is one of two films starring the two in 2016, the other being Sanam Re

The film was released worldwide on 24 June 2016.

== Plot ==
Captain Jahan Bakshi (Pulkit Samrat) is a passionate army officer who thinks all things happen according to his will and that he can control his destiny. Suhani (Yami Gautam), a Punjabi girl from an army family is found swimming in an army restricted area. She is later rescued by captain Jahan without her will. She has to stay in the army camp for a day because of the procedure. She asks Jahan to sign the apology letter. The investigating officer invites her to a Christmas party. After the party, they meet at a riverside. Jahan tears the letter, leading her to ask him to apologise or that she would leap. Jahan doesn't pay any heed to her, so Suhani leaps. However, he immediately saves her.

The next morning Jahan visit Suhani at the hospital and gives her the apology letter. They start developing feelings for each other. This further changes into love when Jahan meets Suhani at Amritsar and she plans a trip for Jahan by lying to her parents. When she returns, her father scolds her harshly, takes away her phone, and restricts her from going outside. This is due to him finding out Suhani's feelings towards Jahan. He fears that if Jahan were to die in the line of duty, Suhani would be heartbroken. Hence, he lays a condition for Jahan to either leave the army, or Suhani. Jahan refuses to comply and leaves. Having no other option left, Suhani elopes. However, after reaching the army camp, she sees a girl hugging Jahan, misunderstands the scenario, and returns home.

Later, Jahan and his team find people trapped under snow, saving them. Those people then invite him to the wedding of their son Yash. During the ceremony, he notices that the bride is Suhani. Rangoli clears Jahan's confusion and tells him to confess his love to Suhani. So he writes a letter to her which is instead read by Yash. Yash exclaims in front of everyone that he can't be so cruel to ruin Suhani and Jahan's love. Suhani's father too, accepts their love noticing Suhani's discontentment without Jahan. The story ends with Suhani and Jahan reuniting and kissing each other.

== Cast ==
- Pulkit Samrat as Captain Jahaan Bakshi
- Yami Gautam as Suhaani Kapoor
- Poonam Kaur as Kamya
- Hrishitaa Bhatt as Mishti
- Taran Bajaj as Tullu
- Gulshan Devaiah as Yash
- Aneesha Joshi as Rangoli
- Manoj Bakshi as Father

== Production ==
=== Development and Casting ===
Junooniyat was conceived as a romantic drama film that would showcase the chemistry between lead actors Pulkit Samrat and Yami Gautam. The film marked the second collaboration between the two actors in 2016, following the release of Sanam Re earlier that year. Director Vivek Agnihotri wrote and directed the film, which was produced by Bhushan Kumar and Krishan Kumar under the T-Series Films banner.

=== Filming and Locations ===
The film's production primarily took place in Jammu and Kashmir, particularly in Kashmir, where the picturesque landscape served as a significant backdrop for the romantic narrative. The shooting schedule spanned from 2015 into 2016, with various sequences filmed across the region's scenic locations. The production crew chose Kashmir for its natural beauty and cultural ambiance, which complemented the film's storyline.

=== Production Challenges ===
During filming, the production faced significant challenges. While returning from Kashmir, the crew was allegedly hounded and assaulted by Kashmiri locals, reportedly due to the use of native girls in a song sequence. The incident highlighted tensions around the use of local talent in film productions and raised concerns about working conditions in certain regions. Despite these difficulties, the production team completed filming and proceeded with post-production work.

=== Technical Production ===
The film's cinematography was handled by Attar Singh Saini, known for his work in Indian cinema. The editing was completed by Antara Lahiri, who worked to maintain the film's narrative pacing and emotional resonance. The music composition, featuring work by Meet Bros, Jeet Gannguli, and Ankit Tiwari, was recorded during 2015–2016, with Raju Singh contributing the background score.

== Soundtrack ==
Junooniyat

Soundtrack album by Meet Bros, Jeet Gannguli and Ankit Tiwari
- Released: 24 May 2016
- Recorded: 2015–2016
- Genre: Feature film soundtrack
- Length: 29:45
- Language: Hindi
- Label: T-Series

The music was composed by Meet Bros, Jeet Gannguli and Ankit Tiwari while the background score was by Raju Singh. Kumaar, Saurabh M Pandey, Rashmi Virag and Manoj Muntashir served as the lyricists.

On 28 June 2016, T-Series released a bonus track of the film on their YouTube channel, called, "Ishqe Di Khidki". On 12 July 2016, T-Series released another bonus track of the film on their YouTube channel, called, "Junooniyat (Unplugged)".

Track listing
No.	Title	Lyrics	Music	Singer(s)	Length
1.	"Junooniyat" (Title Track)	Kumaar	Meet Bros	Falak Shabir	6:23
2.	"Mujhko Barsaat Bana Lo"	Rashmi Virag	Jeet Gannguli	Armaan Malik	4:26
3.	"Ishqe Di Lat Tadpave"	Manoj Muntashir	Ankit Tiwari	Ankit Tiwari, Tulsi Kumar	5:28
4.	"Nachenge Saari Raat"	Kumaar, Taz, Hunterz	Meet Bros	Neeraj Shridhar, Tulsi Kumar	4:12
5.	"Tu Junooniyat"	Manoj Muntashir	Jeet Gannguli	Shrey Singhal, Akriti Kakkar	5:00
6.	"Pagalon Sa Naach"	Kumaar	Meet Bros	Khushboo Grewal, Meet Bros	4:16
7.	"Ishqe di khidki"	Saurabh M Pandey	Bobby-Imran	Shahid Mallya, Palak Muchhal	3:49
Total length:					33:35

== Box office ==
The film grossed ₹4 million (US$42,000) on its opening day in India and reached ₹37 million (US$380,000) in first week. The lifetime collection of film was ₹41.0 million (US$430,000).
