= Madmast Barkhaa =

- Directed by: Jaspal Singh
- Written by: Sundip Rale
- Produced by: Jaspal Singh
- Starring: Leena Kapoor; Ekaansh Bhaardwaaj; Ashish Joshi; Zoya Rathore; Mushtaq Khan; Mithilesh Chaturvedi; Farida Dadi; Prakash B kashyap
- Cinematography: Pramod Pandey
- Edited by: Dharam Soni
- Music by: Raj Verma
- Production company: Singh Multimedia Creation
- Release date: 29 May 2015
- Running time: 115 minutes
- Country: India
- Language: Hindi

Madmast Barkhaa is a 2015 Indian thriller film directed by Jaspal Singh and produced by Sundip Rale under the Singh Multimedia Creation banner. The film was scheduled for release on 29 May 2015.

== Cast ==
- Ekaansh Bhaardwaaj as Akaash
- Leena Kapoor as Barkhaa
- Ashish Joshi as Ranbir
- Zoya Rathore as Neetu
- Mushtaq Khan
- Mithilesh Chaturvedi
- Farida
- Prakash B. Kashyap

== Plot ==
The story revolves around Leena Kapoor, who is married to a military man named Ranbir, who has to leave, leaving Barkhaa alone. Now lonely, she begins an affair with her husband's friend Akaash. Ranbir's sister Neetu then discovers Barkhaa's affair with Akaash.
