= Vishal Pandya =

Indian film director and screenwriter

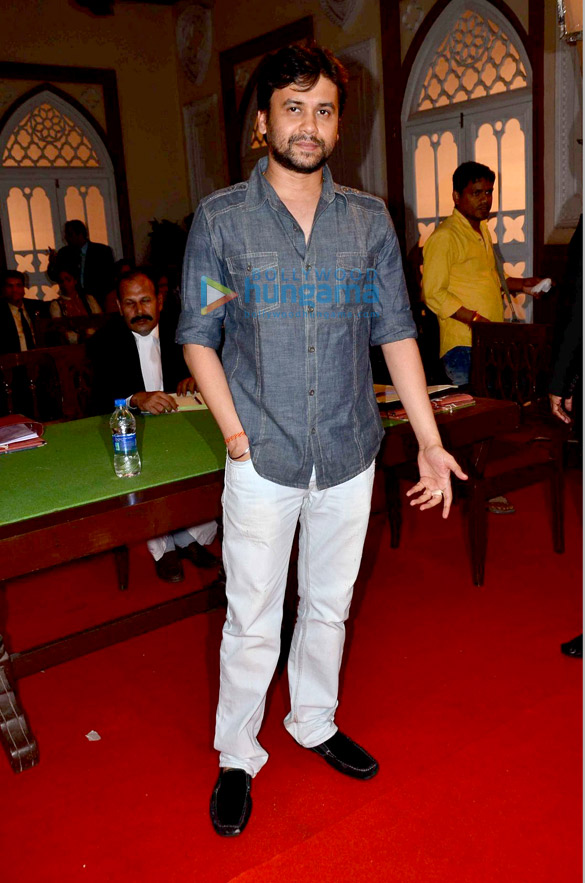
- Vishal Pandya on the sets of Hate Story 3
- Occupations: Film director and screenwriter
- Years active: 2014 – present

Vishal Pandya is an Indian film director and screenwriter, who has directed Hate Story 2, Hate Story 3, Wajah Tum Ho and Hate Story 4 for the production house of T-Series He directed Poison 2, an original ZEE5 thriller series that was released on 30 April 2020

== Career ==
Pandya made his directorial debut with Three: Love, Lies, Betrayal in 2009.

His second work was the 2014 erotic thriller film Hate Story 2, which was produced by the T-Series owner Bhushan Kumar and Vikram Bhatt. The film was a sequel to the 2012 sleeper hit, Hate Story. The film's nett gross was ₹2,290,000,000 and was it declared "Average" by Box Office India.

After the success of Hate Story 2, Pandya directed the 2015 erotic thriller Hate Story 3, the third installment of Hate Story film series. The film was declared a "Hit" by Box Office India.

He wrote and directed the 2016 erotic thriller Wajah Tum Ho. Despite being made on a small budget of ₹140,000,000, the film failed to perform well at the box office and was also declared a "Flop" by Box Office India.

In 2018, he directed Hate Story 4 which opened with mixed to negative reviews.

== Filmography ==
=== Films ===
| Year | Title | Director | Writer |
|---|---|---|---|
| 2009 | Three: Love, Lies, Betrayal | Yes | No |
| 2014 | Hate Story 2 | Yes | No |
| 2015 | Hate Story 3 | Yes | No |
| 2016 | Wajah Tum Ho | Yes | Yes |
| 2018 | Hate Story 4 | Yes | No |

=== Webseries ===
| Year | Title | Role | Notes |
|---|---|---|---|
| 2020 | Poison 2 | Director | |
