= Yea Toh Two Much Ho Gayaa =

- Directed by: Anwer Khan
- Written by: Anwer Khan
- Produced by: Mudar Unwala; Ali Unwala
- Starring: Jimmy Sheirgill; Arbaaz Khan; Bruna Abdullah; Pooja Chopra
- Cinematography: Rajiv Srivastava
- Edited by: Devendra Murdeshwar
- Music by: Avishek Majumdar
- Production companies: M A Entertainment; Trinity Films
- Release date: 2 September 2016
- Country: India
- Language: Hindi

Yea Toh Two Much Ho Gaya (transl. This has become too much!) is a 2016 Indian comedy action drama movie directed by Anwer Khan. It features Jimmy Sheirgill, Arbaaz Khan, Bruna Abdullah and Pooja Chopra in lead roles. The film was released on 2 September 2016.

== Plot ==
The movie starts in Thailand in a restaurant when Mann is at a party with his girlfriend. Rickey, a lazy boy who is the brother of a gangster, tries to take a selfie with her and is stopped by Jimmy Shergill. When they try to leave, the boy attacks them, but they are badly beaten and hospitalized. In the other part, the gangster Arbaaz Khan kills his rival gangster, and then he learns that his brother is hospitalised. He visits his brother in the hospital and swears revenge. He has a twin brother, Mohan, who lives with his mother in a village. He loves a girl, but her cousin's brother opposes the marriage. Then both brothers find them in a situation where Mohan goes to Thailand and Mann returns to the village. The girlfriend of Mann is kidnapped by a gangster in Thailand, and here in a village, a pregnant lady levels allegations against Mohan. Mann clears his brother's name in front of the Village Panchayat. Whereas Mohan rescues Mann's girlfriend from a gangster after thrashing him and his henchmen and returns to the village. Then the marriage of Mann and Mohan is performed.

== Cast ==
- Jimmy Sheirgill as Mann/Mohan
- Pooja Chopra as Meena
- Bruna Abdullah as Tina
- Arbaaz Khan as Mak
- Murli Sharma as Rajveer Chaudhry
- Zarina Wahab as Mann's Mother
- Maushumi Udeshi as Sapna
- Dev Sharma as Ricky
- Vijay Patkar

== Soundtrack ==
The soundtrack of the film is composed by Avishek Majumdar, with lyrics written by Anwer Khan, Jairaj Selvan, & Vishal V. Patil.

Yea Toh Two Much Ho Gayaa

Soundtrack album by Avishek Majumdar
- Released: 2016
- Genre: Feature film soundtrack
- Label: Zee Music Company

=== Track listing ===
No.	Title	Singer(s)	Length
1.	"Meri Aawaargi"	Ankit Tiwari & Aditi Paul	03:42
2.	"Party Time"	Bhoomi Trivedi	03:45
3.	"Hairat-e-Aashiqui"	Akanksha Sharma & Javed Ali	04:26
4.	"Chappan Taal"	Monali Thakur & Nakash Aziz	03:43

Super Flop
