= Super Nani =

2014 Indian film by Indra Kumar

- Theatrical release poster
- Directed by: Indra Kumar
- Written by: Vipul Mehta
- Based on: Baa Ae Maari Boundary by Imtiaz Patel
- Produced by: Indra Kumar; Ashok Thakeria
- Starring: Rekha; Sharman Joshi; Randhir Kapoor; Anupam Kher; Shweta Kumar
- Music by: Harshit Saxena; Sanjeev–Darshan
- Release date: 31 October 2014
- Country: India
- Language: Hindi

Super Nani (transl. Super grannie) is an Indian comedy drama directed and produced by Indra Kumar, starring Rekha, Sharman Joshi, Randhir Kapoor, Anupam Kher and Rajesh Kumar. The film is based on the Gujarati play, Baa Ae Maari Boundary by Imtiaz Patel. The music is composed by Harshit Saxena and Sanjeev–Darshan.

The film was released on 31 October 2014 and marked Randhir Kapoor's final screen appearance.

== Plot ==
The film begins with a guy called Manorath “Mann” Mehra video interviewing some people for a job. He gives them the job description and they ask how much the salary is. He replies saying nothing which leaves them all shocked. They question him and he says there are many people who do this job for nothing in this world, our mothers. They all praise their mothers and agree that mothers are the ones who do this job and that too for free.

He goes home to a proud mother who begins telling him about her mother Bharti who does nothing but work and look after the family. The story moves on to Mumbai where Bharti is singing and living a happy life with her family. Turns out that she is just dreaming and that her family treat her like a maid, they give her no importance and mock her ways. The maid is the only one in the house who appreciates and sees what this mother does. She prays to god asking him to do right by her as she always thinks good for her family.

Mann reaches Mumbai and is on the streets taking part in a celebration. He arrives at his grandmothers. He wears a mask and knocks on the door, the maid opens the door and he chases her. Bharti comes out and immediately remembers his childhood when he would chase the maid wearing a similar mask. He goes to the temple with her and sees a girl dancing called Riya, who he befriends. Soon he sees the way the rest of the family treat her and decides to bring a change. He takes the help of Riya and gets Bharti dressed up in many different ways and clicks pictures of each pose. He shows these photos to the family who are shocked and angry. They ask him to leave and return to America and scold Bharti.

Mann has arranged for a professional to come and interview Bharti for acting and modelling. Her husband refuses and stops her. The professional happens to know her from childhood and with the help of Aman explains to her that she needs to make her place in this house. Her husband attempts to snatch and rip the contract papers, but she stops him and agrees to the modelling.

She starts her modelling and the family becomes lost. They argue as they cannot handle the household chores as well as the responsibility of each other. Mann pays the maid to leave until Bharti returns so that the family realise her worth.

They transform her into a modern woman and send her home. The family is amazed to see her dressed modernly and receiving calls from important people. She receives a call from Dubai and is offered a job. She takes this opportunity and takes Mann with her. She knows Mann likes Riya and brings her along too. They admit to have feelings towards each other and spend some time together in Dubai.

Bharti returns and is quite wealthy after many jobs. Her son Suketu wants to borrow money from her, so, he goes to butter her up. She gives him 1 crore and asks him to sign a contract that he will return it in 15 days. He loses the money and is rude to his mother. She files a complaint and sends him to jail to teach him a lesson. Whilst in jail, he realises how much he has wronged his mother. She comes and takes the complaint back. Suketu apologises and admits to his mistakes.

Suketu's wife Astha is given a role in a movie, but after many attempts, she is not able to act properly. The director is rude to her and at that time Bharti arrives. She tells the director off for speaking rudely to a woman and asks for time to speak to her; otherwise, she will pay for the shooting time wasted. Mann and Bharti are able to talk her into trying to act the scene out again. She completes the scene perfectly and the director falls at her feet in happiness as they have finally completed a scene without any problems.

Astha realises her mistakes and apologises to Bharti for treating her wrong. She asks if she can touch her feet as the first and last time she did that was years ago when she first came into the house as a bride. Her daughter Gargi comes down and tells the family that she is moving out to live with her boyfriend Sameer. She tells them that they will have a live-in relationship, as he is not divorced yet and they are holding a party to celebrate. The family attends the party and whilst dancing, Gargi faints.

Mann had drugged Gargi's drink which made her collapse. He arranged a studio to look like a hospital. Anupam Kher dresses up as a doctor and informs the family that Gargi needs a kidney transplant. He tests everyone for a match and tells them that Sameer's is a match. Sameer is taken away by Mann and the doctor and he asks about the changes that the transplant will make to his life. They scare him and he refuses to give the kidney. He breaks their relationship and goes. Bharti slaps Sameer and explains to Gargi that if he couldn't look after his family how would he look after her.

The doctor, Mann and Bharti tell the family that this was an act to show Sameer's true colours and that Gargi is now safe.

Mann tells Riya that his mother has fixed his relationship and she is angry. She asks what about her. He tells her that if she doesn't attend his wedding who will he marry. Bharti receives an award and asks her husband to attend the celebration. He refuses and accuses her of wanting to show him down. Mann sees this and shouts at his grandfather for treating Bharti wrong. Gargi apologises to her mother and gifts her a saree to wear at the celebration.

At the award ceremony Bharti thanks Mann for changing her life for the better. She sees her husband at the back of the room and calls him on to stage to receive the award with her. He delivers a speech on how women respect their husbands even though they sometimes treat her badly. He tells her that he has realised his mistakes and he asks for forgiveness. He blames himself as the children saw him disrespecting Bharti and followed him.

Mann prepares to leave. The family gather to send him off and Bharti tells them that Riya will take him to the airport. Bharti's husband tells her he loves her very much and the movie ends with a family picture and a song.

== Cast ==
- Rekha as Bharti Bhatia (Chunni)
- Randhir Kapoor as R.K. Bhatia
- Sharman Joshi as Manorath Mehra (Mann)
- Shweta Kumar as Riya
- Anupam Kher as Mr. Sam “Sammy” (Bamboo)
- Rajesh Kumar as Suketu Bhatia
- Shreya Narayan as Astha Bhatia, Suketu's wife
- Vishakha Subhedar as Ratna
- Aanchal Dwivedi as Gargi Bhatia
- Varsha Usgaonkar as Chandni
- Vaishnavi Mahant as Mann's Mother
- Vandana Vithlani as lady who brings the marriage proposal for Gargi (cameo, uncredited)
- Raju Rahikwar as Jr. Shahrukh Khan

== Soundtrack ==
The music was composed by Harshit Saxena and Sanjeev–Darshan and released by Zee Music Company. All lyrics were penned by Sameer.

Super Nani

Soundtrack album by Harshit Saxena and Sanjeev–Darshan
- Released: 2014
- Recorded: 2014
- Genre: Soundtrack
- Length: 27:50
- Label: Zee Music Company
- Producer: Harshit Saxena

Harshit Saxena and Sanjeev–Darshan chronology
Hate Story (2012)	Super Nani (2014)	Welcome Back (2015)

Track list
No.	Title	Singer(s)	Length
1.	"Prabhu Mere Ghar Ko"	Shreya Ghoshal	5:21
2.	"Maheroo Maheroo"	Shreya Ghoshal, Darshan Rathod	4:34
3.	"Nani Maa"	Sonu Nigam	5:57
4.	"Dhaani Chunariya"	Shreya Ghoshal, Harshit Saxena	5:48
5.	"Haathi Ghoda Paalki"	Harshit Saxena	1:09
6.	"Dhaani Chunariya" (Rock Version)	Harshit Saxena	5:01
Total length:			27:50

== Reception ==
Anupama Chopra of Hindustan Times gave the film 1 out of 5, calling the film "painfully dated." She further wrote that "under the wafer-thin garb of women empowerment, Super Nani is offensively regressive." Nandini Ramnath of Scroll.in gave a negative review, calling the film a "regressive eighties-style morality lesson emanate." Shubhra Gupta of The Indian Express gave the film 1 out 5, writing, "How regressive can you get? Are these ‘traditional’ values that we need to topline? It is supremely ironical that a film making fun of ‘saas-bahu’ serials (yes, it tries) shoves exactly those sentiments down our throat. And even more so when you call your leading lady Bharati. We can do without this creaky idea of Mrs India, thank you."
