= Sab Kushal Mangal =

2020 Indian Hindi-language romantic comedy film

- Theatrical release poster
- Directed by: Karan Vishwanath Kashyap
- Screenplay by: Bijendra Karla; Karan Vishwanath Kashyap
- Produced by: Prachi Nitin Manmohan
- Starring: Akshaye Khanna; Priyank Sharma; Riva Kishan
- Cinematography: Sachin K. Krishn
- Edited by: Prashant Singh Rathore
- Music by: Songs: Harshit Saxena; Background Score: Raju Singh
- Production company: One Up Entertainment
- Distributed by: Panorama Studios
- Release date: 3 January 2020
- Country: India
- Language: Hindi
- Box office: est. ₹0.45 crore

Sab Kushal Mangal is a 2020 Indian Hindi-language romantic comedy film directed by Karan Vishwanath Kashyap. The film stars Akshaye Khanna, and newcomers Priyank Sharma and Riva Kishan. It was theatrically released in India on 3 January 2020.

== Plot ==
Pappu, a reality show creator, and a corrupt politician lock horns over Pappu's sensational work. Complications ensue further when they fall for the same girl.

== Cast ==
- Akshaye Khanna as Baba Bhandari
- Priyank Sharma as Pappu Mishra
- Riva Kishan as Mandira
- Satish Kaushik as Mishraji
- Supriya Pathak as Emarti Devi Mishra
- Rakesh Bedi Mandira's father
- Jaya Ojha as Mandira's mother
- Mrunal Jain as Vishnu
- Swati Semwal as Urmila
- Sunita Shitole as Mandira's grandmother
- Yuvika Chaudharyas Neelu
- Ishtiyak Khan as Sonu
- Apurva Nemlekar as Shyama
- Nalneesh Neel as Haricharan
- Mukesh Bhatt as Police inspector
- Shriya Saran (Item number in song "Naya Naya Love")

== Release ==
It was theatrically released in India on 3 January 2020.

== Soundtrack ==
Sab Kushal Mangal

Soundtrack album by Harshit Saxena
- Released: 20 December 2019
- Recorded: 2019
- Genre: Feature film soundtrack
- Length: 24:00
- Language: Hindi
- Label: Zee Music Company
External audio
- Official Audio Jukebox on YouTube

The film's music is composed by Harshit Saxena while lyrics written by Sameer Anjaan.

Track listing
No.	Title	Singer(s)	Length
1.	"Na Duniya Mangi Hai"	Harshit Saxena, Bhoomi Trivedi	4:25
2.	"Zamana Badal Gaya"	Sonu Kakkar, Vandana Saxena	3:25
3.	"Sab Kushal Mangal - Title Track"	Bappi Lahiri, Usha Uthup, Akshay Dhawan, Harshit Saxena	3:28
4.	"Naya Naya Love"	Bhoomi Trivedi, Harshit Saxena	4:23
5.	"Ishq Ne Mara Re"	Harshit Saxena, Swaroop Khan, Bhoomi Trivedi	4:15
6.	"Nayi Wali Jab"	Sunidhi Chauhan	4:04
Total length:			24:00

== Reception ==
Ambica Sachin of Khaleej Times rated the film 2.5/5 and wrote, "Sab Kushal Mangal is a film that's confused about its own intentions. Watch only if you are an Akshaye Khanna fan." Ronak Kotecha of The Times of India rated the film 2/5 stars and wrote, "The film’s narrative makes half-hearted attempts at underlining social ills like forced marriages and dowry, but never really takes a solid stand. What works against the film is not its story but the execution that suffers from weak writing and missed opportunities for an impactful social satire." Prasanna D. Zore of Rediff.com rated the film 2/5 stars and wrote, "First-time director Karan Vishwanath Kashyap has done a good job of making a cute rom-com that falters only during the last 15 minutes in its 134 minutes length."

Nandini Ramnath of Scroll.in wrote, "The maximum fun is had by Akshaye Khanna, playing up the stereotype of the Uttar Pradesh criminal-politician. Khanna’s Babu enlivens the movie whenever he appears, which isn’t as often as it needed to be, and his absence is sorely felt." Udita Jhunjhunwala of Firstpost rated the film 2/5 stars and wrote, "Sab Kushal Mangal hits the right notes when Akshaye Khanna is on screen but declines to near pallid when it focuses on the flimsy romance between the couple." Mayank Shekhar of Mid-Day rated the film 2/5 stars and wrote, "Honestly, as an audience, when the premise, let alone the story, doesn't work for you, it's best to be distracted by things that do. Because you're in; make the most of it. From that perspective, gotta say, for a movie by a first-time filmmaker, this is quite solidly directed — with some fine performances".

Priyanka Sinha Jha of News18 rated the film 2/5 and wrote, "Sab Kushal Mangal does have a few redeeming features but it is unlikely to make the list of memorable comedies in Hindi cinema." Nonika Singh of The Tribune rated the film 2/5 stars and wrote, "A mature man falling for a young girl by itself is not exactly a new concept. Several comedies have been structured around this uneven courting. [...] The un-necessary ''sic'' addition of songs and superfluous item number further sap the narrative." Kunal Guha of Bangalore Mirror rated the film 1.5/5 stars and wrote, "Torn between detailing social ills and constructing a romcom, Sab Kushal Mangal ends up as an overcooked khichdi that seems too tedious to endure, despite a runtime of just 137 minutes."

Shubhra Gupta of The Indian Express rated the film 1.5/5 stars and wrote, "The film breaks out of an uneasy mess by a contrivance, and tries to steer towards lightness by making Baba, the local yokel, fall for the very girl he has ‘uthwaaoed’." Shilajit Mitra of The New Indian Express rated the film 1/5 stars and wrote, "Everything about Karan Vishwanath Kashyap’s film feels plucked from the past. It’s starchy and sentimental, with a plot that’s crudely offensive, and gloriously glib." Devesh Sharma of Filmfare rated the film 1/5 stars and wrote, "Sab Kushal Mangal does make the right noises about how dowry still makes life hell for the girls and that they should be allowed to make their own choices. It asks questions but doesn’t offer any concrete solutions."

Arnab Banerjee of Deccan Chronicle wrote, "The uninspiring plot gets all the more compounded when the story progresses to make Babu’s character look kind and gentle." Varun HK of Deccan Herald rated the film 0.5/5 and wrote, "It's a sludgy mess of poor creative decisions after poor creative decisions, leading up to a finale that is as flat as it is mundane, completely desperate to end, even if the end is somehow cheaper than the build-up, if you can call it that."
