= Attar Singh Saini =

Indian cinematographer

Attar Singh Saini is an Indian cinematographer who works in Hindi films, prior to which he worked in Indian television.

== Early life and education ==
Saini graduated from the Film and Television Institute of India, Pune in 1992.

== Filmography ==
Year	Title	Notes
2005	Chocolate	
2005	7½ Phere	
2006	Darna Zaroori Hai	
2006	Dil Diya Hai	
2007	Dhan Dhana Dhan Goal	
2008	Summer 2007	
2009	Victory	
2009	Fruit and Nut	
2009	Radio	
2010	Jaane Kahan Se Aayi Hai	
2011	Buddha in a Traffic Jam	
2012	Hate Story	
2012	Khiladi 786	
2016	Junooniyat	
2018	Kaashi in Search of Ganga	
2022	Honeymoon	Punjabi film
2025	The Bengal Files	
