= Madhuri Banerjee =

Indian author

- Born: 9 August 1975 (age 51); Delhi, India
- Education: Lady Shri Ram College for Women
- Writing career
- Language: English, Hindi
- Genres: Fiction, Realistic fiction, non-fiction

Madhuri Banerjee (born 9 August 1975) is an India author, columnist, and screenwriter. She is known for her work in fiction and non-fiction, as well as her contributions to Indian cinema. Her debut novel was Losing My Virginity and Other Dumb Ideas, and she also worked on the Bollywood film Hate Story 2. Banerjee has written for publications like the Asian Age and Maxim.

== Career ==
=== Writing ===
Banerjee's debut novel, Losing My Virginity and Other Dumb Ideas, explored themes of love, self-discovery, and modern relationships. She has since published several other books. She also co-authored the non-fiction book The Yummy Mummy Guide with actress Karisma Kapoor.

=== Journalism ===
Banerjee wrote relationship columns for the Asian Age and Maxim.

=== Film and television ===
Banerjee contributed to the screenplay of the Bollywood film Hate Story 2.

=== Documentary Work ===
Banerjee's documentary Between Dualities focuses on issues faced by women in Indian society. She received a National Award for this documentary.

== Bibliography ==
- Losing My Virginity And Other Dumb Ideas (2011)
- Mistakes Like Love And Sex (2012)
- My Yummy Mummy Guide (2013)
- Advantage Love (2014)
- Scandalous Housewives (2014)
- My Clingy Girlfriend (2015)
- Forbidden Desires (2016)
- The Flaky Mummy (2016)
- Life Switch (2023)

== Filmography ==
Year	Film	Screenplay	Assistant Director	Notes
2001	Yaadein	No	Yes	
2001	Rahul	No	Yes	
2003	Kuch Naa Kaho	No	Yes	
2014	Hate Story 2	Yes	No	

== See also ==
- List of Indian writers
