= Gopal Singh (actor) =

Indian television actor

- Born: 14 November 1976 (age 49); Jewari, Kaimur, Bihar, India
- Education: Sahitya Kala Parishad, Delhi
- Occupation: actor
- Years active: 1997–present

Gopal Singh (born 14 November 1976) is an Indian film, television and theatre actor. Singh is majorly known for his power packed performances and unconventional roles in Hindi films. His major work includes Company, Calcutta Mail, Ek Haseena Thi, Traffic Signal, Page 3, Mumbai Mirror and Buddha in a Traffic Jam, amongst many others. He is also known for portraying many unusual roles on Indian television, biggest one being Birbal in Balaji Telefilms' epic love saga Jodha Akbar.

Singh started his acting career in 1997 in Sahitya Kala Parishad repertory, learning and teaching stage productions and theatre plays. Subsequently, Singh moved base to Mumbai and started his career in mainstream Indian television and film industry.

== Television ==
Year	Serial	Role	Channel
2014–2015	Jodha Akbar	Birbal	Zee TV

== Filmography ==
Year	Film	Role
2002	Company	Surti's Man
2003	Calcutta Mail	
2004	Ek Haseena Thi	Abhijeet
2004	Bardaasht	Man at the Morgue
2005	Page 3	Golmes (Drug Supplier)
2007	Traffic Signal	Samari
2015	Badlapur	Mufti Police Officer Khanolkar
2016	Budhia Singh – Born to Run	Litu
2016	Buddha in a Traffic Jam	Naxal Chief
2017	Pagla Ghoda	Satu
2018	Andhadhun	Sub-Inspector
2018	Gaon	Vaidh Ji
2019	Ferrous	Madan
2024	Bastar: The Naxal Story	Srivastav

2025 maa [ bikas ]

=== Web series ===
Year	Title	Role	Production House	Notes
2019	Abhay	Rawat	Fiction Factory	Released on Zee5
