= Sumit Sethi =

Indian DJ Artist

DJ SNY DELHI
- Born: Delhi, India
- Genres: Bollywood, Punjabi, Pop
- Occupation: DJ
- Years active: 2012–present

DJ SNY DELHI is an Indian music producer, DJ, composer, and performer. Sumit Sethi entered the world of music and DJing at the age of 16 Amongst a wide catalogue of songs, the prominent ones are "Veera" (T-Series), "Gaddi Mashook Jatt Di" (Zee Music Company), "Jai Deva" (Bohra Bros). Sumit Sethi and Jasmine Sandlas come together for a Punjabi EDM track Veera. Sumit Sethi is trying to preserve the heritage of Punjabi folk music. His vision is to fuse electronic music with Bollywood sound. He was nearly thrown out of his house as his parents felt that he was throwing away his professional life on a whim.

== Filmography ==
=== Acting ===
Year	Film	Role	Notes
2009	Jugaad	Cameo	Hindi
2015	Meeruthiya Gangsters	Cameo	Hindi

=== Film ===
Year	Film	Song	Language	Notes
2014	Hate Story 2	"Pink Lips – Remix"	Hindi	Remix
2014	Kick	Hangover	Hindi	Remix
2014	Singham Returns	"Singham Returns Remix (MBA Swag)"	Hindi	Remix
2019	Roy	"Chittiyaan Kalaiyaan"	Hindi	Arranger
2019	The Accidental Prime Minister	Music Director & Background Score	Hindi	Score

=== Singles (music) ===
No.	Released	Title	Co-artist (s)	Label	Notes	Lyricist
1	12 August 2007	"Jai Dev Jai Dev "	Nooran Sisters	"Bohra Bros"	Vakratunda Mahakaaya	
2	12 August 2009	"Tu Cheez Badi Hai Mast Mast"	Natasha Suri	"Venus Music"	Singles (music)	
3	9 July 2015	"NEHAR WALE PUL"	Sona Mohapatra	"Bohra Brothers"	Singles (music)	
4	10 September 2015	"Gadi Hai Mashook Jatt Di"	Sapna Pabbi	Zee Music	The Transporter Refueled	
5	1 August 2016	"Dalinder Dance"	Nataša Stanković	Zee Music Company	7 Hours to Go	
6	3 April 2018	"Veera Video Song"	Jasmine Sandlas	T-Series	Singles (music)	
	2020	"yaraa"				Gopi Sidhu
	2020	"Ishq"				Gopi Sidhu
