= Harshit Saxena =

Indian playback singer and composer (born 1985)

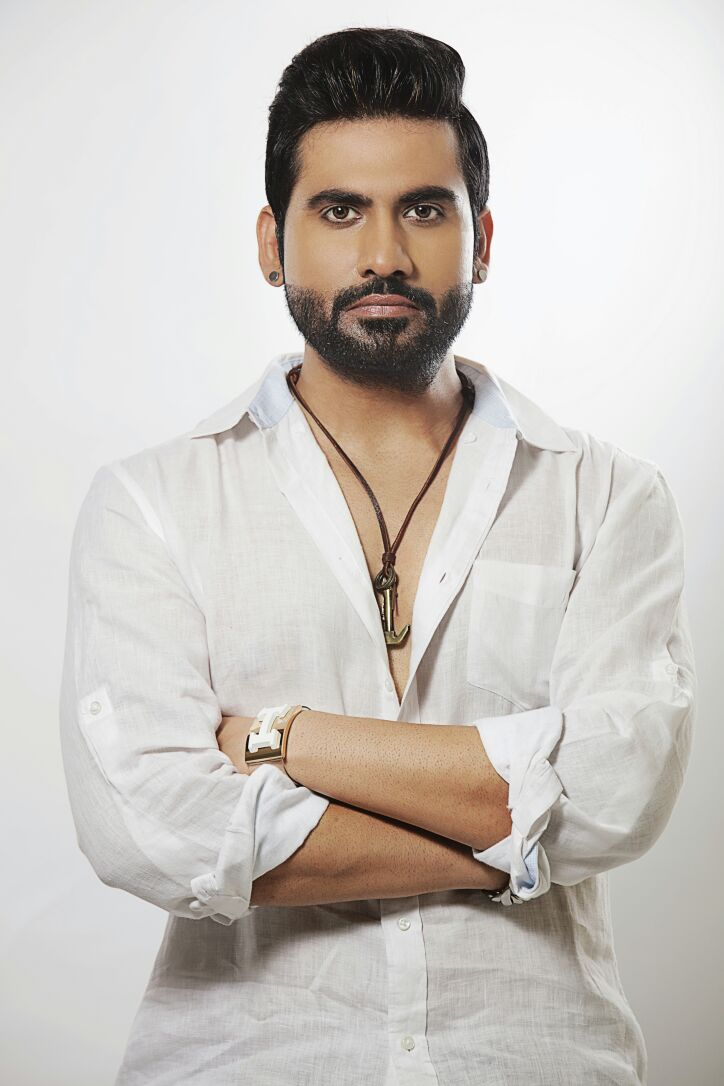
- Harshit Saxena in 2016

Background information
- Born: 21 August 1985 (age 40); Lucknow, Uttar Pradesh, India
- Occupations: Singer, composer
- Years active: 2007–present

Harshit Saxena (born 21 August 1985) is an Indian playback singer and composer. He is known for his work in various Bollywood films, including Murder 2, Hate Story, and Sab Kushal Mangal.

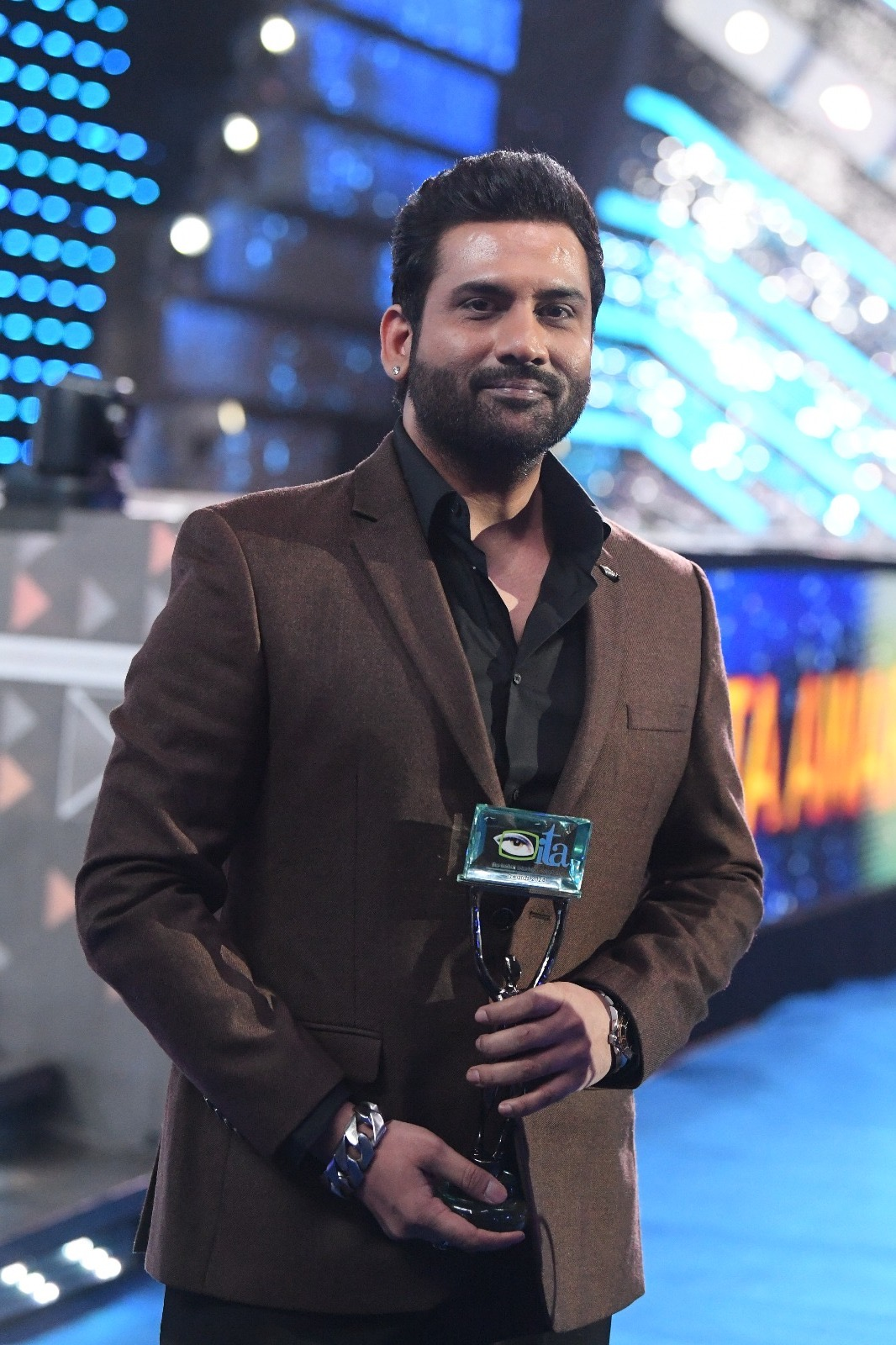
Harshit Saxena at ITA Awards 2024

His debut was as music director for the Murder 2 film.

Saxena won the Upcoming Music Composer Award in 2012 at Music Mirchi Awards for his song "Haal-E-Dil" from Murder 2.

== Early life ==
Harshit Saxena was born on 21 August 1985 in Lucknow, India. His father, Abhilash Saxena, is a retired subdivisional officer in BSNL, Lucknow. His mother, Vandana Saxena, is a housewife from Varanasi.

== Career ==
Harshit Saxena has participated in a number of reality shows, and he was a finalist in Amul Star Voice of India, Jo Jeeta Wohi Super Star, and Music ka Maha Muqqabla.

He also appeared in the first two seasons of Amul Chhote Ustaad, and he performed the song "Happy Ending" in Tees Maar Khan, directed by Farah Khan.

He has appeared on various award functions shows such as "Star Pariwar Awards", "Star Gold Awards", "Star Screen Awards", "Colors Global India Music Awards (GIIMA)", Radio Mirchi Awards, and Big Star Entertainment awards.

He was the music director for Mukesh Bhatt's Murder 2, He composed and sung the song "Haale Dil" in it. It was nominated for several awards, and Saxena received the "Best upcoming Music Director" Award for Murder 2. He also worked as a composer for the movie Hate Story in 2012 and for Super Nani in 2014. He wrote and performed songs for both movies. In 2015, he performed the song Meet Me Daily featuring Anil Kapoor and Nana Patekar in the film Welcome Back. He composed songs for the movie Hotel Milan in 2018. and sang 2 songs in the film Stepney, Allaudin – Version.

In 2020, He was the solo Music Composer for the movie Sab Kushal Mangal . He Sang 4 songs in the Movie. namely, Na Duniya Mangi Hai, Sab Kushal Mangal – Title Track, Naya Naya Love, Ishq Ne Mara Re. Harshit Saxena composed the music for the web series Saat Kadam in 2021. starring Amit Sadh and Ronit Roy. The series features several notable tracks. Following this, he released a number of YouTube singles under prominent music labels such as Tips Industries and Zee Music Company. In 2022, he collaborated with Himesh Reshammiya on a music album.

In 2024, Saxena served as the playback singer for the television show Shrimad Ramayan, which aired on Sony Entertainment Television and was produced by Swastik Productions, founded by Siddharth Kumar Tewary. He continued to lend his voice to the show's continuation, which aired on Sony SAB. His association with Swastik Productions also opened up opportunities in devotional music, leading him to release a series of spiritual tracks that gained wide popularity. In the same year, he received the award for Best Singer at the Indian Television Academy Awards. As of 2025, he is set to contribute as a music director to the upcoming film Romeo S3, directed by Guddu Dhanoa and scheduled for release on 16 May 2025. He is also currently working as a music composer and singer for the television series Veer Hanuman, airing on Sony SAB.

== Personal life ==
Saxena is a trained physiotherapist BPT. Harshit Saxena lives in Mumbai since 2007. His wife is Samonica Shrivastava.

== Discography ==
=== As a singer ===
Year	Movie	Song(s)	Notes
2010	Tees Maar Khan	Happy Ending	
2011	Murder 2	Haal-E-Dil, Haal-E-Dil (Acoustic)	Music Mirchi Award for Upcoming Music Composer
Stand By	Khel Khel Mein		
2012	Hate Story	Mahe Jaan, Mahe Jaan (Rock Version), Dil Kaanch Sa (Heart and Soul Version)	
2014	Super Nani	Dhani Chunariya, Dhani Chunariya (Rock Version)	
2015	Welcome Back	Meet Me Daily Baby (Beat Mix)	
2018	Hotel Milan	Stepney, Allaudin, Allaudin – Version	
2020	Sab Kushal Mangal	Na Duniya Mangi Hai, Sab Kushal Mangal – Title Track, Naya Naya Love, Ishq Ne Mara Re	
2021	Saat Kadam	Chakala Wakala	

=== As a music director ===
Year	Film
2011	Murder 2
2012	Hate Story
2014	Super Nani
2018	Hotel Milan
2020	Sab Kushal Mangal
2021	Saat Kadam

==== Non-film singles ====
Year	Title	Singer(s)	Composer	Label/ Producer	Ref.
2021	Aur Kuch Baaki	Yasser Desai	Harshit Saxena	Zee Music Company	
2022	Dil Terre Naam	Harshit Saxena	Harshit Saxena	Himesh Reshammiya	
2022	Dekh Ke Teri Aankhein	Harshit Saxena	Harshit Saxena	Himesh Reshammiya	
2022	Terre Hoke	Harshit Saxena	Harshit Saxena	Himesh Reshammiya	
2022	Muqtasar	Harshit Saxena	Harshit Saxena	Himesh Reshammiya	
2022	Daaman	Harshit Saxena	Harshit Saxena	Himesh Reshammiya	
2023	Achha Kiya	Raj Barman	Harshit Saxena	Ishtar Music	
2023	Beqadar Bewafa	Harshit Saxena	Harshit Saxena	Ishtar Music	
2023	Babul Teri Galiyan	Bhoomi Trivedi	Harshit Saxena	Deepak Mukut	
2024	Kahin Tu Mose	Yasser Desai	Harshit Saxena	Tips Industries	

=== Devotional releases ===
Year	Title	Performer(s)	Composer	Label / Producer	Ref.
2022	Pawan Bhakti	Sonu Nigam	Harshit Saxena	Tips Industries	
2022	Satguru Ki Jaikaar Likhun	Sanjeev Rathod	Harshit Saxena	Tips Industries	
2022	Guru Ke Dar	Bandish	Harshit Saxena	Tips Industries	
2023	Tera Simran	Harshit Saxena	Harshit Saxena	Tips Industries	
2024	Shrimad Ramayan (TV Title Track)	Harshit Saxena	Lalit Sen	Swastik Productions / Sony TV	
2024	Achyutam Keshavam (Recreation)	Harshit Saxena	Harshit Saxena	Swastik Productions	
2024	Shanknaad	Hemant Brijwasi	Harshit Saxena	Tips Industries	
2024	Aayi Diwali (Diwali Release)	Harshit Saxena	Harshit Saxena	Swastik Productions	
2024	Veer Hanuman	Harshit Saxena	Harshit Saxena	Swastik Productions	
