= Rehan Khan =

Indian singer (born 1985)

Rehan Khan (born in Mumbai, India, India in 1983) is an Indian singer, composer and the member of the "Band Hungama". In February 2007, he won Fame X, an Indian music competition broadcast on SAB TV. He has appeared in a number of Indian films.

== Early years ==
Rehan Khan belongs to a family of musicians. His father, Rizwan Khan, was a professional sitar player but had to leave music to take care of the family by entering the construction business. In 2005, Rehan Khan tried for Indian Idol; he reached the Top 30, but failed to qualify for the finals.

== Fame X ==
In November 2006, he took part in the singing competition Fame X (Hindi: Chal Udiye) inaugural 2006–2007 season. He beat the finalists Anandrupa Bagchi and Neethy Nairthe to emerge as the winner. The other top 10 finalists besides Khan, Bagchi and Nairthe included Rakesh Sharma, Banjo, Ashutosh Jain, Sammy Rajdeep, Aditya Jassi, Ritu Pathak and Arunima Bhattacharya.

Khan won a music contract from Sony BMG India, and a cash prize of Rs 50,00,000 besides being featured on Sony Entertainment Network. In 2007, he released his debut single "Naujawan".

== After Fame X ==
Visa International picked him to sing the "Inspire India Cricket" anthem in support of the Indian cricket team competing in the ICC Cricket World Cup 2007 held in West Indies.

He followed the release of "Naujawan" by singing in the soundtrack of the Bollywood film Heyy Babyy with the song "Mast Kalandar" composed by Shankar–Ehsaan–Loy.

== In Band Hungama ==
Rehan Khan has a musical partnership with Raja Hasan, the winner of three singing reality shows to form a band named, "Band Hungama". They went on to perform more than 250 live shows all across India, and in the Indian diaspora communities of the United States, the United Kingdom, the United Arab Emirates, and Hong Kong. The band was promoted and managed by X Factor Entertainment.
