= Friday Night Productions =

- Type: Private
- Founded: Hyderabad, Andhra Pradesh in 2010
- Headquarters: Hyderabad, India
- Key people: Ravi Agnihotri (co-founder); Abhishek Mohunta(co-founder); Sandeep Goel(co-founder); Pritika Idnani (co-founder)

Friday Night Productions (FNP) is an Indian entertainment company set up by Indian School of Business alumni Ravi Agnihotri, Abhishek Mohunta, Sandeep Goel and Pritika Idnani.

Friday Night Productions was set up to make thematic and content-driven movies, which the company's founders believed was missing in Bollywood productions. The first movie produced by the company in this genre is Buddha in a Traffic Jam to be released in 2016. Buddha in a Traffic Jam features National Film Awards winners Anupam Kher and Pallavi Joshi and also features Dev.D lead Mahi Gill and Yeh Saali Zindagi lead Arunoday Singh as Starcast.
