= Kumaar =

Indian lyricist

- Born: Rakesh Kumar
- Occupation: Lyricist

Rakesh Kumar Pal, known mononymously as Kumaar, is an Indian lyricist who works in Hindi cinema. Some of his songs include "Rula Ke Gaya Ishq", "Tu Bhi Royega", "Dil Ki Aadat", "Baby Doll', "Chittiyaan Kalaiyaan", "Sooraj Dooba Hain", "Lovely", "Desi Look", "Nachan Farrate", "Main Hoon Hero Tera" and "Jhoome Jo Pathaan". He was nominated for the Filmfare Award for the Best Song "Sooraj Dooba Hain" from the film Roy.

== Films ==
- American Blend
- Shaabash! You Can Do It
- Plan (2004)
- Musafir (2004)
- Jawani Diwani: A Youthful Joyride (2006)
- Golmaal: Fun Unlimited (2006)
- Dil Dosti Etc (2007)
- Om Shanti Om (2007)
- Humsey Hai Jahaan (2008)
- Hijack (2008)
- Dostana (2008)
- Bhram (2008)
- Rama Rama Kya Hai Dramaa? (2008)
- Toss (2009)
- The Stoneman Murders (2009)
- Sikandar (2009)
- Life Partner (2009)
- Jashnn (2009)
- All The Best: Fun Begins (2009)
- Raaz - The Mystery Continues (2009)
- Tum Mile (2009)
- Chance Pe Dance (2010)
- I Hate Luv Storys (2010)
- Anjaana Anjaani (2010)
- Hello Darling (2010)
- Crook (2010)
- Golmaal 3 (2010)
- No Problem (2010)
- Toonpur Ka Super Hero (2010)
- Turning 30 (2011)
- Dil Toh Baccha Hai Ji (2011)
- Thank You (2011) - 4 songs
- Dharti (2011)
- Love Express (2011)
- Ready (2011)
- Murder 2 (2011)
- Phhir (2011)
- Sahi Dhandhe Galat Bande (2011)
- Yeh Dooriyan (2011)
- Speedy Singhs (2011)
- Yaar Annmulle (2011)
- Yaara o Dildaara (2011)
- Khushiyan (2011)
- Ra.One (2011)
- Desi Boyz (2011)
- Jo Hum Chahein (2011)
- Lanka (2011)
- Ghost (2012)
- Pure Punjabi (2012)
- Bittoo Boss (2012)
- OMG: Oh My God! (2012)
- Blood Money (2012)
- Shanghai (2012)- 2 songs
- Hate Story (2012)
- Rush (2012)
- Rangeelay (2013)
- Bajatey Raho (2013)
- Yamla Pagla Deewana 2 (2013)
- Ishkq in Paris (2013)
- Shootout at Wadala (2013)
- Aatma (2013)
- Mere Dad Ki Maruti (2013)
- Yeh Jawaani Hai Deewani (2013)
- Gori Tere Pyaar Mein (2013)
- Boss (2013) - 6 songs
- Besharam (2013)
- Grand Masti (2013)
- Singh Saab The Great (2013)
- The Xpose (2014)
- Hasee To Phasee (2014)
- Ragini MMS 2 (2014)
- O Teri (2014)
- Main Tera Hero (2014)
- Hate Story 2 (2014)
- Humpty Sharma Ki Dulhania (2014)
- Bhoothnath Returns (2014)
- Sonali Cable (2014)
- Bang Bang (2014)
- Ungli (2014)
- Dolly Ki Doli (2015)
- Sharafat Gayi Tel Lene (2015)
- Alone (2015)
- Roy (2015)
- NH10 (2015)
- Dilliwali Zaalim Girlfriend (2015)
- Ek Paheli Leela (2015)
- Ishqedarriyaan (2015)
- Gabbar Is Back (2015)
- All Is Well (2015)
- Bhaag Johnny (2015)
- Hero (2015)
- Katti Batti (2015)
- Calendar Girls (2015)
- Singh Is Bliing (2015)
- Welcome Back (2015)
- Hate Story 3 (2015)
- Manjhi - The Mountain Man (2015)
- Airlift (2016)
- Mastizaade (2016)
- Sanam Re (2016)
- Loveshhuda (2016)
- Kapoor and Sons (2016)
- Ki & Ka (2016)
- Baaghi (2016)
- One Night Stand (2016)
- Dishoom (2016)
- Great Grand Masti (2016)
- Do Lafzon Ki Kahani (2016)
- Baar Baar Dekho (2016)
- Akira (2016)
- Junooniyat (2016)
- Beiimaan Love (2016)
- The Legend of Michael Mishra (2016)
- Wajah Tum Ho (2016)
- Saansein (2016)
- Tum Bin II (2016)
- Force 2 (2016)
- Naam Shabana (2017)
- Badrinath Ki Dulhania (2017)
- Commando 2 (2017)
- Kaabil (2017)
- Lucknow Central (2017)
- Guest iin London (2017)
- Raabta (2017)
- Noor (2017)
- Poshter Boyz (2017)
- Hindi Medium (2017)
- Munna Michael (2017)
- Mubarakan (2017)
- Half Girlfriend (2017)
- Golmaal Again(2017)
- Shaadi Mein Zaroor Aana (2017)
- Fukrey Returns (2017)
- Veerey Ki Wedding (2018)
- Welcome To New York (2018)
- Sonu Ke Titu Ki Sweety (2018)
- Saheb, Biwi Aur Gangster 3 (2018)
- Hate Story 4 (2018)
- Baaghi 2 (2018)
- Race 3 (2018)
- Satyameva Jayate (2018)
- Mitron (2018)
- Bhaiyyaji Superhit (2018)
- Hotel Milan (2018)
- Badhaai Ho (2018)
- Zero (2018)
- Simmba (2018)
- Fraud Saiyaan (2019)
- Uri: The Surgical Strike (2019)
- Why Cheat India (2019)
- Total Dhamaal (2019)
- Blank (2019)
- Kesari (2019)
- Badla (2019)
- De De Pyaar De (2019)
- Student of the Year 2 (2019) - 1 song
- Kabir Singh (2019)
- Batla House (2019)
- Khandaani Shafakhana (2019)
- Judgemental Hai Kya (2019)
- War (2019)
- Motichoor Chaknachoor (2019)
- Dream Girl (2019)
- The Body (2019)
- Pati Patni Aur Woh (2019)
- Marjaavaan (2019)
- Good Newwz (2019)
- Shimla Mirchi (2020)
- Jai Mummy Di (2020)
- Street Dancer 3D (2020)
- Doordarshan (2020)
- Hacked (2020)
- Virgin Bhanupriya (2020)
- Khaali Peeli(2020)
- Shakeela (2020)
- Tuesdays and Fridays (2021)
- The Power (2021)
- The Girl on the Train (2021)
- Time to Dance (2021)
- Koi Jaane Na (2021)
- Hello Charlie (2021)
- Bhoot Police (2021)
- Gangubai Kathiawadi (2022)
- Radhe Shyam(2022)
- Bachchan Pandey (2022)
- Attack: Part 1 (2022)
- Jayeshbhai Jordaar (2022)
- Nikamma (2022)
- Jugjugg Jeeyo (2022)
- Rashtra Kavach Om (2022)
- Maja Ma (2022)
- Doctor G (2022) - 1 song
- Dhokha: Round D Corner (2022)
- Code Name: Tiranga (2022)
- Phone Bhoot (2022)
- Mister Mummy (2022)
- Govinda Naam Mera (2022)
- Cirkus (2022)
- Pathaan (2023)
- Shehzada (2023)
- Kisi Ka Bhai Kisi Ki Jaan (2023)
- Bad Boy (2023)
- U-Turn (2023)
- Jogira Sara Ra Ra (2023)
- Satyaprem Ki Katha (2023)
- Dream Girl 2 (2023) - 2 songs
- Jawan (2023)
- Fukrey 3 (2023)
- Thank You for Coming (2023)
- Tejas (2023)
- Starfish (2023)
- Dunki (2023)
- Fighter (2024)
- Article 370 (2024)
- Shaitaan (2024)
- Madgaon Express (2024)
- Luv Ki Arrange Marriage (2024)
- Ishq Vishk Rebound (2024)
- Kalki 2898 AD (2024)
- Indian 2 (2024)
- Ulajh (2024)
- Phir Aayi Hasseen Dillruba (2024)
- Ghudchadi (2024)
- Khel Khel Mein (2024)
- Kahan Shuru Kahan Khatam (2024)
- The Miranda Brothers (2024)
- Singham Again (2024)
- Jaat (2025)
- Jewel Thief (2025)
- Ground Zero (2025)
- Abir Gulaal (2025)]
- Badass Ravi Kumar (2025) - 1 song
- Housefull 5 (2025) - 1 song
- Son of Sardaar 2 (2025)
- Coolie (2025)
- The Ba***ds of Bollywood (2025)
- De De Pyaar De 2 (2025)
- Tu Meri Main Tera Main Tera Tu Meri (2025)
- Border 2 (2026)
- Dhurandhar: The Revenge (2026) - 1 song
- Vadh 2 (2026)
- Bhooth Bangla (2026) - 3 songs
- Mirzapur (2026)
- King (2026)

== Albums ==
- "Kesariyo Rang" (ft. Shantanu Maheshwari)
- "Zaroori Hai Kya Ishq Mein"
- " Teri baat aur hai, Meri baat aur hai"
- "Tere Naal Rehna (Zee Music Originals)"
- "Ishq Tera Tadpave"
- "Tere Naal Nachana"
- "Mere Piya"
- "Karunya"
- "V Super Singer"
- "Dilkare"
- "Lishki Lishki"
- "Dance Likhe Punjabi"
- "Tere Nal Nal"
- "Hunterz"
- "Master Ps"
- "Josh"
- "Chahat"
- "Dil Kare"
- "Honsala"
- "Yaad Teri" (Zee Music)
- "Royee Jande Naina" (Zee Music)
- "Gallan Goriyan" (single)
- "Madhanya"
- ″Thoda Thoda Pyaar Huaa Tumase″

== Awards and nominations ==
Year	Category	Nominated Song	Film	Result	Ref(s)
Mirchi Music Awards
2011	Album of The Year	-	Ra.One	Nominated	
2016	Album of The Year	-	Kapoor & Sons	Nominated	
2016	Listeners' Choice Song of the Year	"Soch Na Sake"	Airlift	Won	
2017	Album of The Year	-	Raabta	Nominated	
2017	Lyricist of The Year	"Pyar Ho"	Munna Michael	Nominated	
