= Hate Story 3 =

2015 film by Vishal Pandya

- Theatrical release poster
- Directed by: Vishal Pandya
- Written by: Vikram Bhatt; Madhuri Banerji; Anupam Saroj (additional dialogues)
- Produced by: Bhushan Kumar; Krishan Kumar
- Starring: Sharman Joshi; Zareen Khan; Karan Singh Grover; Daisy Shah
- Cinematography: Prakash Kutty
- Edited by: Manish More
- Music by: Amaal Mallik; Meet Bros; Baman
- Production company: T-Series Films
- Distributed by: AA Films
- Release date: December 4, 2015
- Running time: 121 minutes
- Country: India
- Language: Hindi
- Budget: ₹20 crore
- Box office: ₹62.21 crore

Hate Story 3 is a 2015 Indian Hindi-language erotic crime-thriller film directed by Vishal Pandya. Produced by T-Series, it stars Sharman Joshi, Karan Singh Grover, Zareen Khan and Daisy Shah, with Priyanshu Chatterjee in a pivotal role. Written by Vikram Bhatt, Anupam Saroj and Madhuri Banerji, the film is part of the Hate Story film series. The film was released on 4 December 2015 and was a box office success.

== Plot ==
The movie begins with rich businessman Aditya Diwan and his wife, Siya, inaugurating a hospital in memory of his elder brother, Vikram Diwan. He shares a touching story of Vikram donating half of his liver to his friend Karan, who had a liver issue during childhood.

Out of the blue, a businessman named Saurav Singhania, gifts Aditya an expensive car and invites him and his wife for lunch. At lunch, Saurav makes an absurd deal of having sex with Siya in return for giving Aditya's company a big profit. Aditya angrily rejects the offer. Saurav starts plotting to destroy Aditya's business. He bribes one of Aditya's factory workers to mix pesticides in his cola city, forcing Aditya to shut down and leading him to put all the blame on his trusted employee Kaya.

Kaya flies to Malaysia where Saurav relates a fake story about how his sister committed suicide because of Aditya. Kaya and Saurav have sex and she agrees to help him. Aditya asks Kaya to deliver money to a politician but this is revealed to be a trap and Kaya is accused. To help her Saurav asks her to call Aditya and tell him that she no longer wants to be his pawn. When Kaya is upset at having falsely implicated Aditya, Saurav kills her and puts the blame on Aditya. Seeing all the evidence go against Aditya, Siya decides to have sex with Saurav. It is revealed that Vikram was killed by his enraged brother Aditya so he could become chairman of the company. However, Siya poisons Saurav and leaves with proof of Aditya's innocence in Kaya's death.

Aditya gets ready to start a new project. Meanwhile, Saurav is revealed to be alive. He confronts Aditya, and they engage in a physical fight, with both of them getting injured. In the end, Saurav kills both Siya and Aditya and collapses afterwards.

It is revealed that, Vikram survived the plane crash but was handicapped. It is also revealed that Saurav is Karan (Vikram's best friend) who decided to avenge the injustice done to his friend. The movie ends with Karan recovering and the dialogue "Relationships are made from the heart, not by blood."

== Cast ==
- Sharman Joshi as Aditya Diwan, Vikram's younger brother
- Karan Singh Grover as Saurav Singhania, who is later revealed to be Vikram's childhood friend Karan
- Zareen Khan as Siya Diwan
- Daisy Shah as Kaya Sharma
- Prithvi Zutshi as Vaswani
- Priyanshu Chatterjee as Vikram Diwan, Aditya's elder brother and Siya's lover
- Shiny Dixit as Aditya Dewan's secretary
- Puja Gupta as an item girl in song "Neendein Khul Jaati Hain"

== Production ==
With the success of Hate Story 2, producer Bhushan Kumar signed director Vishal Pandya for a three-picture deal with T-Series Studios. Early casting included actor Sharman Joshi, but he was replaced by Gurmeet Choudhary for a brief period of time due to conflicts with Joshi's schedule. 26 February 2015, Joshi reported that he was prepared for scenes where he would be nude, and on 1 March, he reported that he was enjoying shooting his explicit scenes. Actress Daisy Shah was brought aboard the project through Salman Khan's insistence that producer Bhushan Kumar speak with her about joining the project. Filming ended on 16 October 2015.

=== Casting ===
Puja Gupta was roped in to do a special song 'Neendein Khul Jaati Hain' in the film.

=== Filming ===
The item song was filmed in October 2015.

== Soundtrack ==
Hate Story 3

Soundtrack album by Amaal Mallik, Meet Bros and Baman
- Released: 4 November 2015
- Genre: Feature film soundtrack
- Length: 20:00
- Language: Hindi
- Label: T-Series
External audio
- Audio Jukebox on YouTube

Singles from Hate Story 3
- 1. "Tumhe Apna Banane Ka" Released: 21 October 2015; 2. "Tu Isaq Mera" Released: 29 October 2015; 3. "Wajah Tum Ho" Released: 12 November 2015; 4. "Neendein Khul Jaati Hain" Released: 26 November 2015

The music for Hate Story 3 is composed by Amaal Mallik, Meet Bros and Baman, while lyrics are written by Kumaar, Manoj Muntashir, Rashmi Virag and Shabbir Ahmed. The music rights for the film have been acquired by T-Series. The first song titled "Tumhe Apna Banane Ka" was released on 21 October 2015, followed by "Tu Isaq Mera" which released on 29 Oct 2015. The full music album was released on 4 November 2015.

The song "Tumhe Apna Banane Ka" is a remake from the 1991 film Sadak.

Track listing
No.	Title	Lyrics	Music	Singer(s)	Length
1.	"Tumhe Apna Banane Ka"	Rashmi Virag	Amaal Malik	Armaan Malik, Neeti Mohan	05:09
2.	"Tu Issaq Mera"	Kumaar	Meet Bros	Meet Bros, Neha Kakkar, Rap by Earl Edgar	04:11
3.	"Wajah Tum Ho"	Manoj Muntashir	Baman	Armaan Malik	05:57
4.	"Neendein Khul Jaati Hain"	Shabbir Ahmed	Meet Bros	Meet Bros, Mika Singh, Kanika Kapoor	04:40
5.	"Love To Hate You"	Shabbir Ahmed	Meet Bros	Shivranjani Singh (Shivi)	04:30
6.	"Tu Isaq Mera (Psycho-Love Mix)"	Kumaar	Meet Bros	Meet Bros, Neha Kakkar, Rap by Earl Edgar	03:51
7.	"Wajah Tum Ho" (Zeeshan Version)	Manoj Muntashir	Baman	Zeeshan	05:49
Total length:					34:07

== Critical reception ==
Bollywood hungama gave the film 3.5 stars. Meena Iyer of The Times of India gave the film 3 stars. Rohit Vats of Hindustan Times gave the film 1.5 stars. Shubhra Gupta of Indian Express gave it 1 star. Koimoi gave it 1 star. Subhash K. Jha of SKJ Bollywood News gave the film 2 stars. Saibal Chaterjee of NDTV gave the film 1 star.

== Box office ==
According to Daily News and Analysis by ZMCL, the film collected ₹97.2 million (US$1.0 million) nett on its opening day. On its second day the film collected ₹105 million (US$1.1 million) nett. Oneindia (Filmi Beat) declared the film a Super Hit after it collected ₹268 million (US$2.9 million) in its opening weekend. According to Oneindia (Filmi Beat) the movie collected ₹312 million (US$3.3 million) in 4 days The film collected ₹39.5 million (US$420,000) nett on its fifth day to take its total to ₹352 million (US$3.8 million). The film collected ₹22.5 million (US$240,000) nett on its second Friday. The movie made ₹422 million (US$4.5 million) by the end of week 1 at the box office. The film collected ₹72.5 million (US$770,000) nett in its second weekend to take its total to ₹495 million (US$5.3 million) nett after ten days. The film collected ₹517 million (US$5.5 million) in 12 days. The movie finished its run with approx.₹750 million (US$8.0 million).

== Awards and nominations ==
Year	Award Ceremony	Category	Recipient(s) and nominee(s)	Result	Ref.
2015	Mirchi Music Awards	Upcoming Male Vocalist of The Year	Zeeshan – "Wajah Tum Ho"	Nominated	

== See also ==
- Hate Story (film series)
