= National Centre for Promotion of Employment for Disabled People =

- Founder: Javed Abidi
- Type: Non-Governmental Organization (NGO)
- Location: New Delhi
- Key people: Chairman- Pradeep Gupta; Executive Director- Arman Ali
- Website: ncpedp.org

National Centre for Promotion of Employment for Disabled People is a New Delhi-based trust established in 1996. It was set up post enactment of 1995 PWD Act to champion the cause of disability rights. The organization's philosophy is that society needs to change traditionally held views of "charity and welfare to those of productivity and empowerment of disabled people". Its founder and first director was Javed Abidi and is currently headed by Arman Ali, who succeeded the founder in October 2018. It operates through a team of Program Managers and Program Officers who work on their specific areas.

National Centre for Promotion of Employment for Disabled People (NCPEDP) is India's only cross-disability, non-profit organization, working as an interface between the government, industry, international agencies, and the voluntary sector towards empowerment of persons with disabilities. The Rights of Persons with Disabilities Act, 2016 seeks to ensure rights of people with disabilities. The law came into force from 19 April 2017 onwards.

NCPEDP works on 6 core principles, also called the six pillars of the organisation, namely:
|| Accessibility
|| Education
|| Employment
|| Law/Policy
|| Awareness
|| Youth.
NCPEDP has a pan India presence through the National Disability Network (NDN). Formed in 1999, NDN has members from the majority of States and Union Territories of the country.

== Work ==
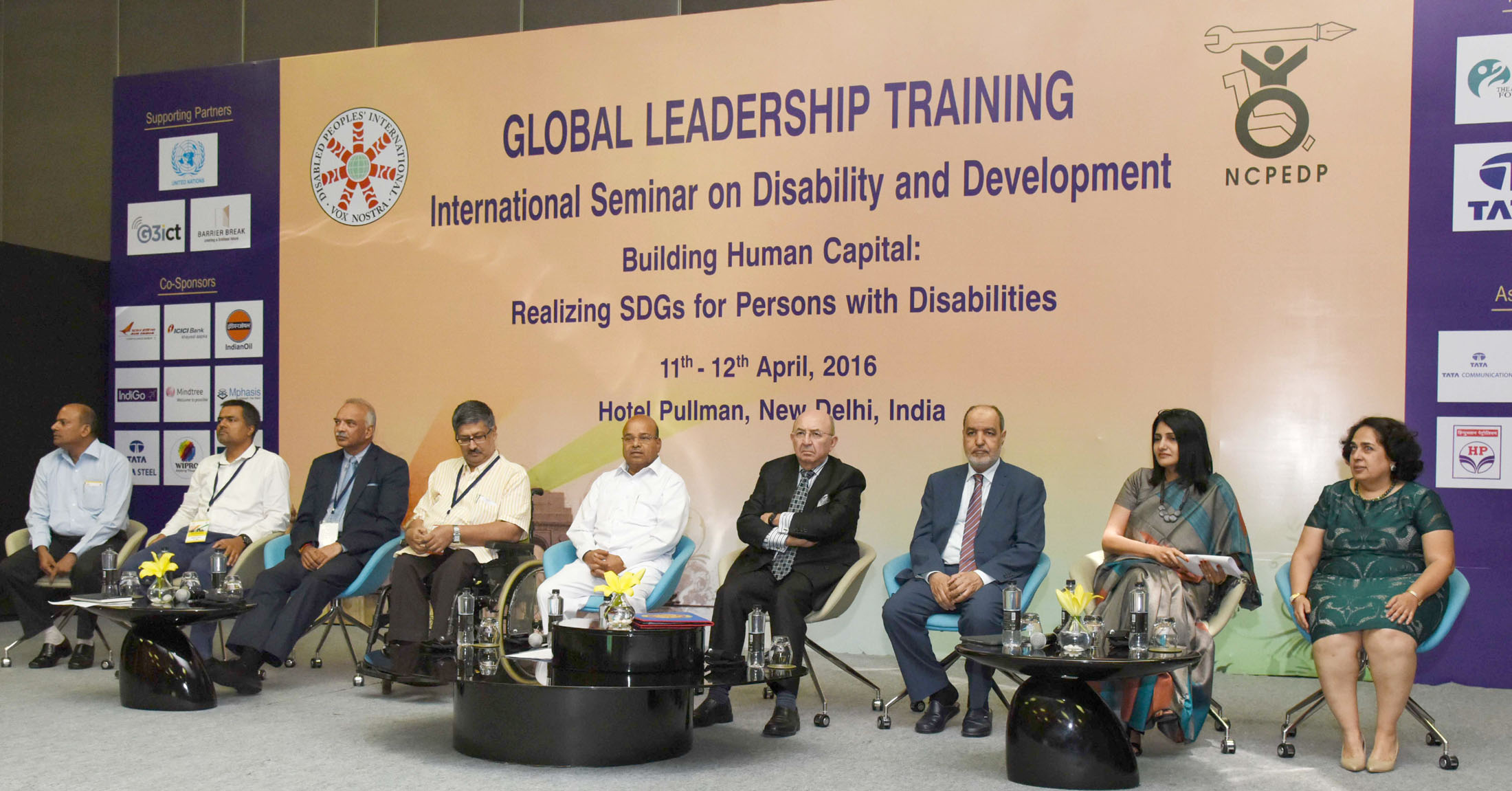
9th World Assembly of Disabled Peoples International, 2016

NCPEDP which regularly conducts workshop to champion disability rights, has also constituted the National Committee on the Rights of Persons with Disabilities (NCRPD) consisting of disability sector leaders and experts from across the country, that meet at regular intervals to discuss ongoing pertinent issues concerning people with disabilities and to plan a viable strategy to address their issues.

In 2021, NCPEDP announced the NCPEDP-Javed Abidi Fellowship, a three-year immersive grassroots fellowship programme for disabled youth who are interested in disability rights and inclusion and are seeking a career in the development sector. The fellowship was introduced in association with Azim Premji Foundation as part of its 25th anniversary.

For the last 25 years, NCPEDP has been advocating for viewing the issues of disabled people with a rights-based approach and equality and gender-based lens; subsequently moving away from traditionally held views of charity and welfare. Since 1996, NCPEDP has successfully advocated for several policies that have positively impacted the lives of thousands of people with disabilities.

NCPEDP also published a series of teaching-learning modules co-developed by UNESCO and P&G Whisper India aimed at integrating menstrual period and puberty education in school curricula. In 2023, NCPEDP in collaboration with the National Human Rights Commission and Insurance Regulatory and Development Authority (IRDA) held a stakeholders consultation with disability advocacy organisations in Mumbai where both private and government insurance companies were present. Securing health insurance is a significant step towards healthcare affordability. As a result of this Arman Ali, finally managed to secure a health insurance after 7 year struggle. It may be noted that India uses a rating system to evaluate a person's degree of disability. As per the system, Ali's degree of disability is 80%. The higher the disability, more difficult it becomes to get insurance. In 2023, NCPEDP in collaboration with Bajaj Finserv launched a Scholarship programme for students with disabilities. The scholarship was in line with National Education Policy 2022. It was first launched in Uttar Pradesh, largest state by population in India.

As Loksabha Elections 2024 approached NCPEDP prepared a 10-point manifesto that was circulated among 600 organisations working for PwDs, and 15,000 individuals. The manifesto, also shared with political parties, called for bigger budgetary allocation for PwDs with a 5% reservation in all levels of governance, and comprehensive health insurance. NCPEDP ED, Arman Ali also said as per Election Commission of India, there were 1 crore PwD voter in India, adding it was time these votes mattered. He urged every single PwD to vote. “One crore votes can make a difference. The new slogan is ‘Nothing Without Us’. All of us pay taxes”.

Recently, in 2024 NCPEDP and PVR INOX collaborated for the film Srikanth, a biopic on noted visually impaired entrepreneur Srikanth Bolla. The collaboration is to ensure the film is more accessible to audiences with disabilities, by making the film available in specialized formats that cater to visually and hearing impaired. PVR INOX to ensure accessibility for the film, has earmarked 1600 wheelchair-friendly seats across various locations to accommodate patrons with disabilities.

== NCPEDP-LTIMindtree Helen Keller Awards ==
The NCPEDP-LTIMindtree Helen Keller Awards (previously NCPEDP-Mindtree Helen Keller Awards) named after Helen Keller, were created in 1999 to honour people and organisations that create employment opportunities for persons with disabilities.

Arman Ali, Executive Director, NCPEDP said, “Over 70 percent of the disabled population are unemployed in the country, as per Equiv.in. The COVID-19 pandemic has affected PwDs disproportionately. While thousands of people moved to work remotely and had access to alternative employment opportunities, PwDs were systematically ignored altogether yet again from all social safety nets, especially for income security." He further said "The need to create sustained opportunities in employment and entrepreneurship for persons with disabilities in both urban and rural areas is more critical than ever." He added, "By providing reasonable accommodation to persons with disabilities, organizations can create an inclusive workforce culture that does not discriminate based on disability. The NCPEDP-Mindtree Helen Keller Awards are one such effort to promote the idea of an inclusive and self-reliant India.”

Paneesh Rao, Advisor, Sustainability at LTI Mindtree said, “Building an equitable society for PwDs requires that we create and sustain opportunities for employment and entrepreneurship. We consider it an honor to be associated with NCPEDP in recognizing individuals and organizations for their pursuit and exemplary efforts and contributions toward delivering social equity and inclusion." He added, "The NCPEDP-Mindtree Helen Keller Awards promotes socio-economic inclusion and supports the empowerment of PWDs. These awards signify the positive impact of collective efforts and shared growth.”

The NCPEDP-Mindtree Helen Keller Awards are given out under the following categories:

- Category A: Role Model Persons with Disabilities
- Category B: Role Model Supporter of Increased Employment Opportunities for Persons with Disabilities
- Category C: Role Model Companies/NGOs/Institutions
- Category: Role Model Entrepreneurs with Disabilities

The latest edition (24th) of the awards were given out on 9 December 2023. The winners included Dr.Rajalakshmi S.J, winner of Miss India Wheelchair 2014 and Miss Popularity at Miss World Wheelchair 2017; and Ummer Farook, founder and chairman of Lakshadweep Differently Abled Welfare Association (LDWA).
