= Almost Pyaar with DJ Mohabbat (soundtrack) =

Soundtrack album by Amit Trivedi
- Released: 25 December 2022
- Recorded: 2021–2022
- Genre: Feature film soundtrack
- Length: 32:06
- Language: Hindi
- Label: Zee Music Company

Amit Trivedi chronology
Rocket Gang (2022)	Almost Pyaar with DJ Mohabbat (2022)	Mrs. Chatterjee vs Norway (2023)

Almost Pyaar with DJ Mohabbat is the soundtrack album to the 2022 film of the same name directed by Anurag Kashyap starring Alaya F and Karan Mehta. The album featured eight songs composed by Amit Trivedi and written by Shellee. The album was released under the Zee Music Company label on 25 December 2022.

== Development ==
Amit Trivedi renewed his association with Kashyap after previously working on Dev.D (2009), Bombay Velvet (2015) and Manmarziyaan (2018). Kashyap considered the soundtrack to be much difficult than their previous collaborations as they wanted to do music that the Generation Z audiences would listen to and the songs had to be associated with the principal character in that language. Hence, the album associated with a multitude of genres such as club music, DJ music, pop, rock and contemporary electronic music, something that suited with teenagers and young adults.

Trivedi utilized the soundscape that heard at music festivals such as VH1 Supersonic, Tomorrowland and Sunburn Festival, and used drums, bass and dubstep for instrumentation. He collaborated with lyricist Shellee, who previously worked on Manmazriyaan, to write gibberish and English words to cater the Gen Z audiences. Kashyap noted that the use of gibberish, helped in finding the younger selves in the songs over finding new music. The title of "Ghanghor Connection" came from Kashyap who wanted to summarize his films with the one-lines in the songs, such as "Emotional Atyachar" from Dev.D and "Keh Ke Lunga" from Gangs of Wasseypur (2012). The song was produced in a jam session with Trivedi, Shellee and Kashyap's daughter Aaliyah to provide inputs on words that the Gen Z uses. The album was in production for four years, as the team went on experimenting with different ideas and versions until they cracked a fresh sound during the COVID-19 pandemic lockdown in India.

== Release ==
The soundtrack was released through Zee Music Company on Christmas day, 25 December 2022.

== Track listing ==
No.	Title	Singer(S)	Length
1.	"Duniya"	Abhay Jodhpurkar	4:08
2.	"Banjaare"	Nikhita Gandhi	4:01
3.	"Woman Desi"	Arjun Kanungo, Bhoomi Trivedi, Aasa Singh	3:34
4.	"Ghanghor Connection"	Abijeet Shrivastva	4:07
5.	"Netflix & Chill"	Arjun Kanungo, Sharvi Yadav	3:51
6.	"Mohabbat Se Kranti"	Raghav Chaitanya, Neha Tawde	3:47
7.	"Maintenance"	Richa Sharma, Manish J Tipu	4:85
8.	"Tabah Tabah"	Shehnaz Akhter, Altamash Faridi, Anand Bhaskar	3:67
Total length:			32:06

== Reception ==
Nandini Ramnath of Scroll.in called it a "throbbing" and "pulsating" score. Sukanya Verma of Rediff.com called it a "spirited soundtrack" adding "not only do they capture the sound of modern love in all its spunky moods but also the timeless hope, fueling it generation after generation". Saibal Chatterjee of NDTV wrote "the film makes wonderful use of Amit Trivedi's musical score and Shellee's lyrics to produce a cri de coeur that deserves to be heard and heeded." Monika Rawal Kukreja of Hindustan Times described it as "an album that talks to you, engages you with its cool and quirky lyrics" and felt all the eight songs were functional to the narrative instead of being misplaced. Grace Cyril of India Today described the songs to be "romance-filled, foot-tapping" and being the USP of the film.

Not all reviews were positive. Ronak Kotecha of The Times of India wrote "Amit Trivedi's unconventional music and Shellee's funky lyrics feel young, fresh and relevant to the story, but for a musical, the overall score isn't up to the mark." Prateek Lidhoo of The Quint gave a positive review to the album and considered "Duniya" and "Mohabbat Se Kranti" as his favorite but added that it misses the potential hits, thereby becoming least favorite of previous Kashyap and Trivedi's collaborations.

Shubhra Gupta of The Indian Express wrote "Amit Trivedi's music not as joyous or effective as it was in Dev.D." Shilajit Mitra of The New Indian Express wrote "Amit Trivedi who shot to fame with Dev D can't weave the same magic here" though he considered "Tabah Tabah" as his favorite from the album. Sneha Bengani of CNBC TV18 considered the soundtrack similar to Manmarziyaan "with lyrics so desperate to sound Gen Z, it's appalling". Anuj Kumar of The Hindu called it to be "genetic aberrations of compositions that we have appreciated in Dev D and Manmarziyaan."
