= Rajalakshmi S. J. =

Wheelchair model and prominent disability rights activist from India

Rajalakshmi S.J
- Education: MDS
- Alma mater: Government Dental College, Bangalore
- Occupations: Activist, Dentist

Rajalakshmi S.J is an Indian disability rights activist. She is also a dentist, educator, and wheelchair pageant winner. Her NGO, SJ Foundation, of which she is chairperson, works for the cause of persons with disabilities. She is a TEDx speaker who regularly participates in wheelchair table tennis tournaments. As an avid car driver, she likes to drive a customized car. One of the 16 recipients of the 2023 NCPEDP-LTIMindtree Helen Keller Awards; she has also received a national award from Ramnath Kovind, President of India under locomotor disability/cerebral palsy category on occasion of International Day of People with Disability. As a motivational speaker, she has spoken at several events. Besides being a Gold Medalist in Dental Surgery, she is also a M.Sc. in Psychology, which she pursued via correspondence. She loves to travel and has already travelled to over a dozen nations on wheelchair.

== Education, legal battles and work ==
Rajalakshmi's parents, S. Janardhan Murthy and Shobha were doctors. She received a bachelor's degree in Dental Science (BDS) 2007 from Oxford Dental College. She completed her graduation and internship in a wheelchair, after the accident and won a Gold Medal. After her accident in 2007 that left her paraplegic, she had to fight a legal battle in Karnataka High Court (filed on her behalf by her mother) to pursue her master's degree in dental surgery from Rajiv Gandhi University of Health Sciences. A favorable judgment got her admission into Government Dental College, Bangalore, and in the process, got 3% reservation policy for the disabled implemented across India. In 2016, she and her mother, who was her companion; filed a case against Air India in Karnataka High Court for misplacing her wheelchair at London Airport during her Europe tour. The high court observed that Air India's conduct violated petitioners fundamental rights as well as provisions under 1995 PWD Act. The court ordered suitable compensation for both petitioners. She says that disabled people should be inducted into government in different capacities. Only then problems they face can be understood and addressed.

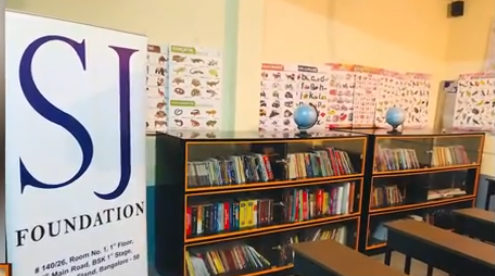

Despite being a gold medallist in Master of Dental Surgery (MDS), she diddn't get a job, so she opened her own dental clinic. She has been part of research projects on genetics and has presented papers. Rajalakshmi always had a passion for modelling, and she has continued to pursue that passion by participating in beauty pageants. She has also studied fashion designing. Currently she is also an assistant professor in Government Dental College, Bangalore. As a certified wheelchair service peer trainer; she works with World Health Organization (WHO), to help and train disabled people, donors, and physiotherapists select the right wheelchair for the disabled. As a dentist she conducts free dental health camps at schools, through SJ Foundation, her NGO. SJ foundation primarily focuses on working to improve the lives of the disabled and underprivileged people, among other things.

== Medical history ==
In 2007, at the age of 21, Rajalakshmi as the college topper was going to Vellore, Tamil Nadu by road to attend a national dental seminar and present a paper, but a truck driver dozed off and rammed the truck into her car, causing an accident that damaged her spinal cord making her paraplegic in lower part of her body. Trained in Bharatnatyam dance as well as western dance, and an aspiring model; the accident not only dashed those dreams but forced her to miss one year of her studies. She spent over 6 months in & out of the hospital and endured major surgeries and numerous physiotherapy sessions. Despite many surgeries, the accident left her paraplegic for life. It took her almost one year to get used to a wheelchair after initially rejecting it, and then realizing that she would remain 'stuck in time and place' if she didn't take control of her life. This happened after she realized there is no foolproof cure for her and she has to live with paralysed limbs for the rest of her life.

== Miss India Wheelchair 2014 contest ==
Rajalakshmi won Miss Wheelchair India 2014 in Mumbai, Maharashtra where the runner-up was Virali Modi. She was among the 7 participants selected from over 200 applications across India. Next year in 2015, she organized the Miss Wheelchair India 2015 pageant, in her hometown Bengaluru through her NGO, SJ Foundation, which she set up in 2015.

== Miss Wheelchair World 2017 contest ==
Rajalakshmi participated in the Miss Wheelchair World 2017 in Warsaw, Poland; where she won the 'Miss Popularity' Award. She competed against 24 contestants from various countries including France, India, Italy, Mexico, Brazil, Canada, Russia, and USA. For the event extensions were added to her wheelchair that allowed her to implement her ideas on stage during the event. The pageant was a learning experience for her as she had to learn to do many things herself.
