= S Sankara Raman =

Activist and social entrepreneur

- Occupations: Disability activist and social entrepreneur

S Sankara Raman is an Indian disability activist and social entrepreneur. He serves as the honorary secretary of Amar Seva Sangam, a disability management Non-government organization based in Tamil Nadu. Sankara Raman was also an elected fellow at Ashoka in 2006. He also got into noticed during 2017 Mumbai Marathon when he didn't run the shorter 2.4 km category for disabled people but ran the 6 km run with everyone else.

== Early life and work ==
Raman was diagnosed with muscular dystrophy at the age of three. He studied to become a Chartered Accountant. His activism and efforts started with his father when he faced discrimination by Chartered Accountant firms by turning down his requests for internships. They wrote to Institute of Chartered Accountants of India and requested for a unique position for his situation. As a response, ICAI created positions for all disabled people in the CA firms of the country.

Raman started his own practice fearing discrimination at corporates. He also joined the Tamil Nadu Welfare Association for Physically Handicapped and worked on disability rights in parallel of his CA practice. In 1991 S. Ramakrishnan and decided to join Amar Seva Sangam to continue his work for disability rights. He also wrote for Frontline and commented on Government Bills on disability.

When Sankara Raman was refused by Marathon organizers for fundraisers, he actively took it to media highlight that they were Differently abled and not disabled. This led to fundraising marathons with disabled citizens also participating.

== Awards/recognition ==
Sankara is the recipient of Helen Keller Award by National Centre for Promotion of Employment for Disabled People Director Arin Paul made a movie on his life titled as S. Sankara Raman - The Man, The Myth, The Legend.
