= Javed Abidi =

Disability Rights Activist

- Born: 11 June 1965; Aligarh, Uttar Pradesh, India
- Died: 4 March 2018 (aged 52); Delhi, India
- Resting place: Sector 56–58 near Ghata village, Gurgaon, Haryana, India
- Citizenship: Indian
- Education: Aligarh Muslim University, Wright State University
- Organization: NCPEDP

Javed Abidi (11 June 1965 – 4 March 2018) was an Indian activist who served as the director of the National Centre for Promotion of Employment for Disabled People (NCPEDP) in India, and the founder of the Disability Rights Group.

He received an education in Journalism and Communication at Wright State University in Dayton, Ohio. He set up the disability wing of the Rajiv Gandhi Foundation in India, after being invited to do so by Sonia Gandhi.

== Early life ==
Abidi was born on 11 June 1965 in Aligarh, Uttar Pradesh. He was born with spina bifida. Abidi first had surgery at the age of eight to treat his spina bifida. As a result, he had nerve damage. He required another surgery at the age of 10 after an injury from a fall. He moved with his family to the United States. After their move to the United States, Abidi received medical care at the Boston Children's Hospital and the Rehabilitation Institute of Chicago. Abidi began using a wheelchair at age fifteen.

Abidi studied at Wright State University. In 1989, he moved to India to pursue a career in journalism.

== Involvement in disability awareness ==
In 1993, he started working for Sonia Gandhi, creating and building the Rajiv Gandhi Foundation's Disabilities Unit. A year later, Javed Abidi joined a small advocate group called the Disability Rights Group and started raising awareness for the disabled people of India. A large pro-disability rights movement arose, with the goal of getting the Parliament of India to implement a bill of rights for disabled people. Javed Abidi led a protest before Parliament on 19 December 1995. The protest pushed Parliament into passing the Persons with Disabilities Act on 22 December 1995. In 2004, his letter to Chief Justice of India addressed the accessibility of polling booths for persons with disabilities.

== Involvement in the NCPEDP ==
The Rajiv Gandhi Foundation created the National Centre for Promotion of Employment for Disabled People in 1995 and appointed Abidi as its director. Abidi collaborated with business executives from IBM, Apple Inc., Oracle Corporation, Cisco Systems, Microsoft, and Hewlett-Packard to employ disabled individuals in these companies and in the high-tech industry in general. In 2000, Abidi urged the Archaeological Survey of India to install wheelchair ramps at various prominent monuments, including the Red Fort, Qutub Minar, Humayun's Tomb, and Jantar Mantar. The impetus for the ramps was to accommodate Stephen Hawking while he visited these sites. For the next two years, Abidi and the NCPEDP focused on accessibility for disabled people, publishment of disability issues, and work opportunities for disabled people.
