= Sharad Kelkar =

Indian television actor (born 1976)

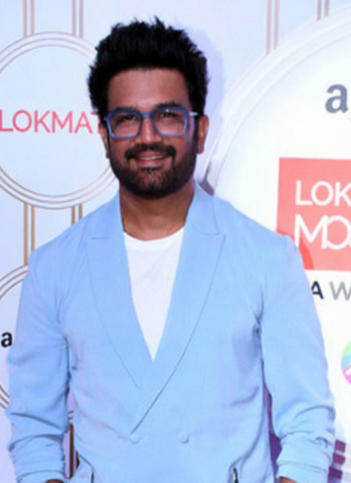
- Sharad Kelkar in 2023
- Born: 7 October 1976 (age 50); Jagdalpur, Chhattisgarh, India
- Education: Prestige Institute of Management, Gwalior (M.B.A)
- Occupation: Actor
- Years active: 2001-present
- Height: 6 ft 1 in (1.85 m)
- Spouse: Keerti Gaekwad Kelkar (m. 2005)
- Children: 1

Sharad Kelkar is an Indian television and film actor and voice actor who works primarily in Marathi and Hindi films, television and web series.

== Early and personal life ==
Kelkar was born in a Marathi family and brought up in Jagdalpur. His father was a PWD engineer in Madhya Pradesh Government. Kelkar graduated in MBA from Prestige Institute of Management, Gwalior and Laxmibai National Institute of Physical Education, Gwalior. He married his co-star Keerti Gaekwad Kelkar on 3 June 2005, and together they have a daughter named Kesha. They both have participated in Nach Baliye 2.

== Career ==
In 2004, Kelkar made his television debut with the show Aakrosh which aired on Doordarshan in which he played the role of Inspector Sachin Kulkarni.

His wife Keerti Gaekwad Kelkar is a television actress who has appeared in Saat Phere – Saloni Ka Safar as Chandni / Devika in a negative role. Together, in 2006 the couple also appeared on the dance reality show Nach Baliye 2.

In 2007, Kelkar hosted Rock-N-Roll Family along with former Hero Honda Sa Re Ga Ma Pa Challenge 2007 contestant Mauli Dave. Kelkar was host of the show Pati Patni Aur Woh on NDTV Imagine in 2009. Then he appeared as Thakur Digvijay Singh Bhadoria in Bairi Piya which earned him critical acclaim for his performance. In 2010, he participated in reality comedy TV series, Comedy Circus Mahasangram (2010) paired with Bharti Singh and Paresh Ganatra. In 2011, Kelkar played a grey character role of Satya in Uttaran he entered the show along with Harsha Khandeparkar who played his sister in the show. His role lasted for about six months in the show. Kelkar was also part of Marathi film Chinu where he played the hero to the female protagonist who plays the title role of Chinu. In 2012, he replaced Mohnish Behl as Dr. Ashutosh in the serial Kuch Toh Log Kahenge which aired on Sony Entertainment Television India. From 2010 to 2013, he presented a crime show, Shaitaan – A Criminal Mind.

In 2013, Kelkar was offered a role in Sanjay Leela Bhansali's Goliyon Ki Raasleela Ram-Leela where he plays the role of a possessive elder brother. Then in 2014, he was seen in Lai Bhaari where he played Sangram the main antagonist. The film became the highest-grossing Marathi film. In 2015, he was seen in Hero and did a special appearance for a single song in A Paying Ghost.

From September 2015 to April 2016, Kelkar was seen as Agent Raghav Sinha in his crime and mystery thriller Agent Raghav - Crime Branch which aired on &TV. He describes his role as "Here's a guy who is suave and dapper, with an IQ that can give even the most intelligent and shrewd criminal a run for his money. He can do things that very few can – read people's minds and use deductive reasoning. I haven't played such a character or taken up a crime series like this before. Besides, the premise of the show was unique and I couldn't let it go.". In 2016 he was seen in Mohenjo Daro, Rocky Handsome which released on 25 March 2016. In the same year, he also did his Telugu debut through Sardaar Gabbar Singh where he played the main antagonist Bhairav Singh.

In 2017, Kelkarwas seen in Indian television show Koi Laut Ke Aaya Hai as Rishabh Singh Shekhari. He also played the main antagonist Dhauli in Sanjay Dutt starrer Bhoomi. He also appeared in Irada as Paddy F Sharma a business tycoon. He also acted in Sangharsh Yatra Biopic of late Gopinath Munde a famous BJP politician in Maharashtra. He did guest appearances in movies like Guest in London and Baadshaho. He also debuted as a producer for Marathi film Idak : The Goat which was screened at the Cannes festival.

In 2018, Kelkar acted in three Marathi films Rakshas, Madhuri, and Youngraad. He was also seen in a music video Majbooriyan.

In 2019, Kelkar did his debut short film Through Purple. He also did his digital debut web series through The Family Man, an Amazon prime series. Then he was seen in Housefull 4 where he played as Suryabhan/Michael Bhai one of the antagonists. His another web-series Rangbaaz phirse (season 2) released in December 2019.

In January 2020, Kelkar played the role of Shivaji I in the film Tanhaji. he was appreciated for his performance. Anna M. M. Vetticad of Firstpost praised the portrayal of Laxmii by Sharad Kelkar calling it a mature performance. He was also seen in ZEE5 series Black Widows opposite Mona Singh in December 2020

In 2021, Kelkar played the role of a military officer in the film Bhuj: The Pride of India.

In 2022, Kelkar played a dark-shaded character in Operation Romeo. In the film, he played the character of a police officer. Kelkar played the Antagonist role in Code Name: Tiranga. His next release was Pan Indian Marathi historical Period film Har Har Mahadev playing the role of Bhaji Prabhu Deshpande, a Maratha warrior character in the film.

In 2023, Kelkar appeared in Chor Nikal Ke Bhaga where he played the role of an investigation officer. He also played the role of Golf Coach in the sports Drama Slum Golf.

In 2024, Kelkar made his Tamil debut through playing the role of Aryan in Ayalaan. Later that year, Kelkar played the supporting role of real-life businessman Ravi Mantha in Srikanth Bolla's Hindi biopic, Srikanth. The same year, he also starred Marathi action film Raanti.

Since July 2025, he portraying Aryavardhan in Zee TV's Tumm Se Tumm Tak, opposite Niharika Chouksey after an eight-year television hiatus.

== Filmography ==
Key
†	Denotes films that have not yet been released

=== Films ===
List of Sharad Kelkar film credits
Year	Title	Role	Language	Notes
2004	Hulchul	Dr. Satyendra "Sattu" Mishra	Hindi	Cameo
2005	Uttarayan	Young Raghu	Marathi	
2012	1920: Evil Returns	Amar Pratap	Hindi	Cameo
2012	Chinu	Raj	Marathi	
2013	Goliyon Ki Raasleela Ram-Leela	Khanji Sanera	Hindi	
2014	Lai Bhaari	Sangram	Marathi	
2015	Hero	Dheeraj Mathur	Hindi	
2015	A Paying Ghost	Himself	Marathi	Special appearance
2016	Mohenjo Daro	Srujan Dhanraj	Hindi	Cameo
2016	Rocky Handsome	ACP Dilip	Hindi	
2016	Sardaar Gabbar Singh	Raja Bhairon Singh	Telugu	
2017	Irada	Paddy Sharma	Hindi	
2017	Sangharsh Yatra	Gopinath Munde	Marathi	
2017	Guest Iin London	Ashutosh	Hindi	Cameo
2017	Bhoomi	Dhauli	Hindi	
2017	Baadshaho	Inspector Durjan	Hindi	
2018	Rakshas	Avinash	Marathi	
2018	Youngraad	Senapati	Marathi	
2018	Madhuri	Dr. Tushar Kesar	Marathi	
2019	Purple	Mohit	Hindi	Short film
2019	Housefull 4	Suryabhan/Michael	Hindi	Double role
2020	Tanhaji	Chatrapati Shivaji	Hindi	
2020	London Confidential	Tanmay Kulkarni	Hindi	Cameo
2020	Laxmii	Laxman Sharma	Hindi	
2020	Darbaan	Anukul	Hindi	
2021	Bhuj: The Pride of India	Ram Karan "RK" Nair	Hindi	
2022	Operation Romeo	Mangesh Jadhav	Hindi	
2022	Bhediya	Anika's father	Hindi	Cameo
2022	Code Name: Tiranga	Khalid Omar	Hindi	
2022	Har Har Mahadev	Baji Prabhu Deshpande	Marathi	
2023	Chor Nikal Ke Bhaga	Parvez Sheikh	Hindi	
2023	Chatrapathi	Bhavani	Hindi	
2024	Ayalaan	Aryan	Tamil	
2024	Srikanth	Ravi Mantha	Hindi	
2024	Raanti		Marathi	
2025	Sky Force	Ahmed Hussain / Sq Leader 71	Hindi	
2025	Dil Dosti Aur Dogs	Sanjay	Hindi	

=== Television ===
Year	Title	Role	Notes
2001	Aap Beeti	Inspector Sameer	
2004	Aakrosh	Inspector Sachin Kulkarni	
2004	Bhabhi	Advocate Kunal	
2004	Raat Hone Ko Hai	Neel	
2004–2005	CID	Inspector Jehan	
2005	C.I.D. Special Bureau	Inspector Jehan	
2005–2007	Sinndoor Tere Naam Ka	Rudra Raizada	
2005–2009	Saat Phere – Saloni Ka Safar	Nahar Singh/Amritanand	Lead role
2006	Nach Baliye 2	Contestant	8th place
2007	Sa Re Ga Ma Pa Challenge	Host	
2008	Rock-N-Roll Family	Host	
2009	Pati Patni Aur Woh	Host	
2009–2010	Comedy Circus	Contestant	
2009–2010	Bairi Piya	Digvijay Singh Bhadoria / Ranveer	
2010	Sarvggun Sampanna	Abhay	
2011	Uttaran	Satya Singh	
2012–2013	Kuch Toh Log Kahenge	Dr. Ashutosh Mathur	
2012–2013	Shaitaan – A Criminal Mind	Host	
2015–2016	Agent Raghav – Crime Branch	Agent Raghav Sinha	
2017	Cineplay – Stage On Screen – Boichek	Parag	
2017	Koi Laut Ke Aaya Hai	Rishabh Singh Shekhari	
2019–present	The Family Man	Arvind	
2019	Rangbaaz Phir Se	Raja Phogat	
2020	Special OPS	IB Officer Surya	
2021	Case Files With Sharad Kelkar	Host	
2021	Black Widows	Yatin Mehrotra	
2021-2024	The Legend of Hanuman	Narrator/Ravana	
2023	Slum Golf	Gautam Rane	
2024	Indian Police Force	Jagtap	
2024	Baahubali: Crown of Blood	Amarendra Baahubali	
2024	Doctors	Dr. Ishaan Ahuja	
2025–present	Tumm Se Tumm Tak	Aryavardhan	Lead Role
2026	Taskaree	Bada Chaudhary/Chote Chaudhary	Netflix series

=== Music videos ===
List of Sharad Kelkar music video credits
Year	Title	Role	Singer(s)
2018	"Majbooriyan"	Agent Vikram	Soham Nayak and Antara Mitra
2025	"Jai Bhavani Jay Shivaji"	Maratha Warrior	Kailash Kher

== Voice acting ==
=== Dubbing roles ===
==== Hollywood films ====
Title	Actor	Character	Dub Language	Original Language	Original Year release	Dub Year release	Notes
Dawn of the Planet of the Apes	Jason Clarke	Malcolm	Hindi	English	2014	2014	
Guardians of the Galaxy	Lee Pace	Ronan the Accuser	Hindi	English	2014	2014	Released as Brahmand Ke Boss (ब्रह्मांड के रक्षक) for the title of the Hindi dubbed version and he was credited in the Hindi dub credits for the DVD release.
Captain Marvel	Lee Pace	Ronan the Accuser	Hindi	English	2019	2019	
Furious 7	Jason Statham	Deckard Shaw	Hindi	English	2015	2015	
The Fate of the Furious	Jason Statham	Deckard Shaw	Hindi	English	2017	2017	
Exodus: Gods and Kings	Joel Edgerton	Ramesses II	Hindi	English	2014	2014	
Mad Max: Fury Road	Tom Hardy	Max Rockatansky	Hindi	English	2015	2015	
X-Men: Apocalypse	Oscar Isaac	En Sabah Nur / Apocalypse	Hindi	English	2016	2016	
Moana	Dwayne Johnson	Maui	Hindi	English	2016	2016	
xXx: Return of Xander Cage	Vin Diesel	Xander Cage	Hindi	English	2017	2017	
Hobbs & Shaw	Jason Statham	Deckard Shaw	Hindi	English	2019	2019	
F9: The Fast Saga	Jason Statham	Deckard Shaw	Hindi	English	2021	2021	
Fast X	Jason Statham	Deckard Shaw	Hindi	English	2023	2023	
Heads of State	Idris Elba	Sam Clarke	Hindi	English	2025	2025	
Moana	Dwayne Johnson	Maui	Hindi	English	2026	2026	

==== Indian films ====
Title	Actor	Character	Dub Language	Original Language	Original Year release	Dub Year release	Notes
Baahubali: The Beginning	Prabhas	Amarendra Baahubali and Mahendra Baahubali	Hindi	Telugu	2015	2015	
Baahubali 2: The Conclusion	Prabhas	Amarendra Baahubali and Mahendra Baahubali	Hindi	Telugu	2017	2017	
Gaddalakonda Ganesh	Varun Tej	Gaddalakonda "Gani" Ganesh	Hindi	Telugu	2019	2022	
Vinaya Vidheya Rama	Ram Charan	Konidela Ram	Hindi	Telugu	2019	2023	
Dasara	Nani	Dharani	Hindi	Telugu	2023	2023	
Adipurush	Prabhas	Raghava	Hindi		2023	2023	Original Hindi version dubbed
Salaar: Part 1 – Ceasefire	Prabhas	Deva	Hindi	Telugu	2023	2023	
Rangasthalam	Ram Charan	Chelluboina Chitti Babu	Hindi	Telugu	2018	2025	
Ayalaan	Himself	Aryan	Hindi	Tamil	2024	2025	
Ramayana: Part 1	Yash	Ravana	Hindi		2026		Original Hindi version dubbed

== Awards ==
- 2010 – Gold Awards for Best Actor in a Negative Role (Critics) — Bairi Piya.
- 2014 - Nominated - Filmfare Award for Best Supporting Actor – Marathi for Lai Bhaari
- 2017 – Nominated- SIIMA Award for Best Actor in a Negative Role (Telugu) for Sardaar Gabbar Singh
- 2023 – Pinkvilla Style Icons Awards – Super Stylish Versatile Personality
- 2025 - NDTV Entertainment Awards - Personality of the Year

== See also ==
- List of Indian television actors
- Dubbing (filmmaking)
- List of Indian Dubbing Artists
