= Almost Pyaar with DJ Mohabbat =

2023 Indian film by Anurag Kashyap

- Theatrical release poster
- Directed by: Anurag Kashyap
- Written by: Anurag Kashyap
- Produced by: Zee Studios; Ranjan Singh; Akshay Thakker; Dhruv Jagasia; Kabir Ahuja; Ajay Rai
- Starring: Karan Mehta; Alaya F; Ambar Arya; Vicky Kaushal
- Cinematography: Sylvester Fonseca
- Edited by: Konark Saxena
- Music by: Amit Trivedi
- Production companies: Good Bad Films; Zee Studios
- Release date: 3 February 2023
- Country: India
- Language: Hindi
- Box office: est. ₹25 lakh

Almost Pyaar with DJ Mohabbat (transl. Almost in love with DJ Mohabbat) is a 2023 Indian Hindi-language musical romantic drama film written and directed by Anurag Kashyap. The film stars debutant Karan Mehta and Alaya F in the lead roles. The film had its world premiere at the 2022 Marrakech Film Festival and Asian premiere at the Hainan Island International Film Festival. Post release, the film was praised by the audiences. Despite these reviews, the film was a huge commercial failure, grossing only ₹25 lakh.

== Synopsis ==
In London, a girl likes a boy a little too much. And, in a parallel universe, there is a boy who likes a girl. The two unrequited love stories, burdened by social status, caste, religion, and inequality, are breathlessly heading toward each other. Two tragic love stories—one musical and an uncanny coincidence—as told by the Guru of Love, DJ Mohabbat.

== Cast ==
- Karan Mehta as Yakub Siddiqui / Harmeet Singh
- Alaya F as Amrita Suri / Ayesha Salim Phgura
- Vicky Kaushal as DJ Mohabbat (special appearance)
- Navnindra Behl
- Sapna Pabbi as Sapna
- Arjun Kanungo as male club singer
- Paritosh Sand as Amrita's father
- Mallika Prasad as Amrita's mother
- Raghunath Singh as Police Cop

== Production ==
Almost Pyaar with DJ Mohabbat was written by Kashyap in the early 2010s where the initial story was based on his experiences from his teenage years. He initially wrote the story for Alia Bhatt who was then shooting for her debut film Student of the Year (2012) but scrapped as it was a "scary idea" for everyone as it deals with partriarchal conditioning and parenting; Bhatt would later play a minor cameo role in Ugly (2014). As Kashyap then focused on other projects, his daughter Aaliyah knew about the progress of the project and his interest in making the film. After a casual conversation with her regarding the progress of the project, Kashyap had thought that telling the story based on teenage experiences would not work out as the world had changed. Hence, he had to rewrite the story from the perspective of the current generation, where a family's honour is associated with their children falling in love. He curated two scenarios set in Himachal Pradesh and London, where one revolved around a Muslim boy and a Hindu girl, and the other revolved around a Pakistani girl and Indian boy, and a central character of a disc jockey would interlink these two stories.

Karan Mehta was cast as the male lead after Aaliyah found him in one of the short films that released in 2016. Kashyap conducted workshops and training in parkour to hone the two principal characters. As one of them has a lisp, Mehta spoke with the locals in Himachal and spent more time with them to understand the nuances of the people living there. Alaya F was cast even before she made her debut in Jawaani Jaaneman (2020) as Kashyap watched an eight-minute showreel of hers' and got impressed by her acting talent. Kashyap initially wanted the titular character DJ Mohabbat to be a mystery person and the entire film being done through a podcast with the voice of the character, but felt that it needed a face in order to interconnect the two stories. Vicky Kaushal, who worked with Kashyap in Raman Raghav 2.0 (2016) and Manmarziyaan (2018), was therefore cast as the titular character; Kaushal did not charge any remuneration for the film.

Almost Pyaar with DJ Mohabbat was initially began production in late 2018 and continued for four years due to the COVID-19 pandemic lockdown in India. The film was entirely shot in Dalhousie, India and London. Kashyap considered the film to be a struggle financially, as he had sold most of his assets to make the film. During production, the principal distributor Reliance Entertainment dropped the project, albeit 50 percent of the film being completed. Having no money to shoot the remaining film, he then showcased the rough edit to Vishal Bhardwaj, Rajkumar Hirani and Imtiaz Ali who provided suggestions to change the structure of the film and add Kaushal's character. Hirani edited the film for two weeks and gave a structure to the film in a certain way, while Ali also provided him certain ideas. Bhardwaj and Gulzar provided dialogues for DJ Mohabbat's character. Kashyap stated that everyone in the industry came together to help him complete the film, hence a longer thanks card was featured in the opening credits.

== Soundtrack ==
The film's soundtrack is composed by Amit Trivedi with lyrics written by Shellee. The album was released through Zee Music Company on 25 December 2022, coinciding with Christmas.

== Release ==
Almost Pyaar with DJ Mohabbat had its world premiere at the 19th Marrakech International Film Festival in Morocco, and at the Hainan International Film Festival. The film received a U/A certificate from the Central Board of Film Certification and was theatrically released on 3 February 2023.

== Reception ==
Ganesh Aalgave of Firstpost stated "Almost Pyaar With DJ Mohabbat is a cinematic treat if you love unconventional takes on romantic dramas". Shubhra Gupta of The Indian Express wrote "Despite a few fumbles, both the leads are impressive. Kashyap’s singular ability to show us the dark side of putative romance– the ‘almost pyaar’ of the title– rescues the film, and tilts it back on its axis". Titas Chowdhury of News18 wrote, "Almost Pyaar With DJ Mohabbat isn’t one of Anurag’s better works, but it surely has a heart. It might not be as intense or kranti-kari as it had promised, but it has a sublime quality to it. It might not be the answer to trim out the noise, the hate and the prejudice but it hits home." Grace Cyril of India Today wrote that "Almost Pyaar with DJ Mohabbat might not be Anurag Kashyap's greatest work yet, but it is certainly worth giving a watch. The film is filled with a whole lot of love and the efforts show."

Ronak Kotecha of The Times of India wrote "It’s a love story fraught with regular societal challenges and clichés, told in a unique way. But beyond that it falls woefully short of making this film an entertaining and a deeply engaging experience". Nandini Ramnath of Scroll.in wrote "Like its title, the ambitious twinned narrative is almost there. Amit Trivedi’s tunes, the heartfelt performances and Kashyap’s trademark candour linger in the mind, like memories of a time filled with hope and possibility." Shilajit Mitra of The New Indian Express wrote "A lot is conveyed by how Anurag Kashyap directs the two chase sequences in Almost Pyaar with DJ Mohabbat. They feel brisk but truncated: a character tries to escape, succeeds. Much later in the film, he tries again but fails, tragically. As simple as that." Pratikshya Mishra of The Quint stated "Anurag Kashyap’s Almost Pyaar With DJ Mohabbat might not be his best work but the film’s subliminal and astute messaging is enough to keep the story running, flaws kept aside." Saibal Chatterjee of NDTV reviewed, "Almost Pyaar With DJ Mohabbat is a musical love story with a spin on it that liberates it from the constraints of the genre."

Sukanya Verma of Rediff.com wrote "Truth is the film works best when it stays close to his bleak worldview and indie film-making aesthetics [...] While the idea behind evolved, liberal minds not always linked to education or economic stature is certainly myth-busting, Kashyap struggles to bridge the gap between his social commentary on love jihad. As a consequence, Almost Pyaar with DJ Mohabbat comes across as wildly fragmented with a short attention span." Uday Bhatia of Mint wrote "There’s one intriguing bit in the film, when a kindly elderly couple is revealed to be bigoted on multiple levels. It’s something a younger Kashyap would have doubled down on, made menacing and significant. Here, it passes by unexamined. It’s been a while since Kashyap’s seemed like himself." Anuj Kumar of The Hindu wrote "Years after he broke conventions of love stories with Dev.D, his latest attempt at reinvention is a timely and well-meaning but scattered and almost laboured take on the perils of modern love across cultures."

Monika Rawal Kukreja of Hindustan Times wrote "watch Almost Pyaar thinking that you're getting to watch a musical concert and in between, small skits are performed to keep you entertained, but don't try too hard to wrap your head around the motive of the film, because your efforts might not meet with an end result." Prateek Sur of Outlook wrote "Almost Pyaar With DJ Mohabbat is a modern-day take on unrequited love. The two different stories keep you hooked till the very climax when they end up finally revealing the connection between the two stories. The music is fab, and so is the cinematography. People looking for a feel-good romantic film can steer clear of this, as you might be disappointed to wit's end. But, if you’re looking for an out-of-the-box romantic film, then this is a music watch."
