= Government Dental College =

Government Dental College may refer to several colleges in India:

- Government Dental College, Bangalore
- Government Dental College, Silchar
- Government Dental Hospital and College, Chennai
