= Alaya F =

American actress (born 1997)

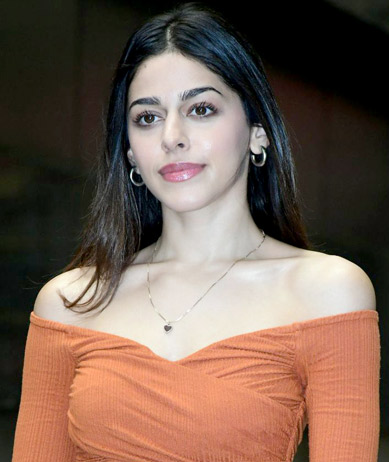
- Alaya F in 2025
- Born: Aalia Furniturewala; 28 November 1997 (age 28); Los Angeles, California, U.S.
- Education: Jamnabai Narsee School; New York Film Academy
- Occupation: Actress
- Years active: 2020–present
- Parents: Farhan Ebrahim Furniturewala (father); Pooja Bedi (mother)
- Relatives: Bedi family

Aalia Furniturewala (born 28 November 1997), professionally known as Alaya F, is an American actress who appears in Indian Hindi-language films. Born into the Bedi family, she is the daughter of Indian actress Pooja Bedi. She made her acting debut in 2020 with the comedy film Jawaani Jaaneman, for which she won the Filmfare Award for Best Female Debut. She has since starred in the thriller Freddy (2022) and the biopic Srikanth (2024).

== Early life and background ==
Alaya F was born Aalia Furniturewala on 28 November 1997, in Los Angeles, United States to Indian parents, actress Pooja Bedi and businessman Farhan Ebrahim Furniturewala. Her mother was based in the United States with her family at the time of her birth. She is of Gujarati Khoja and Parsi descent on her father's side and Punjabi, Haryanvi, British and Bengali descent on her mother's side. She is the granddaughter of actor Kabir Bedi and classical dancer Protima Bedi.

She studied at Jamnabai Narsee School in the Juhu neighbourhood of Mumbai. Before making her film debut, she also earned a diploma in acting at the New York Film Academy (NYFA) in the Financial District of Downtown Manhattan, and later changed her name to Alaya F. She is presently training to be a Contemporary and Kathak dancer. In 2011, she appeared on the reality show, Maa Exchange, with her mother.

== Career ==
Alaya made her film debut with Nitin Kakkar's Jawaani Jaaneman (2020), a family comedy-drama, in which she played a pregnant 21-year-old girl who uncovers the identity of her father. Bollywood Hungama noted, "Alaya makes an excellent debut and puts up a confident act. She looks gorgeous and is the only actor who moves viewers to an extent". While Vibha Maru of India Today mentioned "Alaya will steal your heart. She is just a natural in front of the camera." She earned the Filmfare Award for Best Female Debut for her performance.

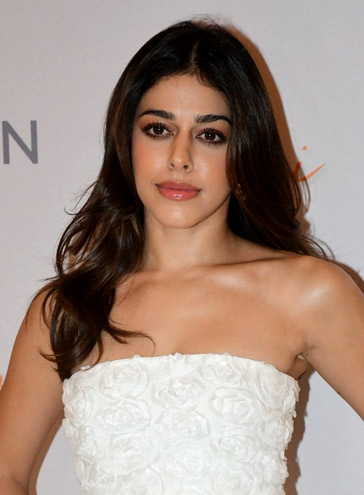
Alaya at an event in 2024

Alaya next played the antagonist as a woman in an abusive marriage who seeks help from her dentist (played by Kartik Aaryan) in the 2022 thriller Freddy. Devesh Sharma of Filmfare described Alaya as both "vulnerable" and "cunning". She then appeared in Anurag Kashyap's romance Almost Pyaar with DJ Mohabbat (2023), opposite Karan Mehta. Grace Cyril of India Today was appreciative of Alaya's growth as an actress, and thought that she "portrayed both her characters with ease, perfection and brings out the innocence in her so well". The film emerged as a box-office bomb. In the same year, she played a news intern in the Zee5 film, U-Turn. Deepa Gahlot praised her for "holding the film together, pulling out the right emotions required, and not letting the slightest scepticism leak out of those large, expressive eyes."

In 2024, Alaya played an IT specialist in Ali Abbas Zafar's actioner Bade Miyan Chote Miyan, co-starring Akshay Kumar and Tiger Shroff. It was theatrically released on Eid to negative reviews from critics and emerged as a box-office bomb. She then played the girlfriend of blind entrepreneur Srikanth Bolla in his biopic Srikanth, opposite Rajkummar Rao. Pratikshya Mishra of The Quint noted that she "leaves a mark" despite her limited screen time.

Alaya F next mark her web debut with Hrithik Roshan's Amazon Prime untitled series.

== Media image ==
Alaya is a celebrity endorser for several brands and products including Lenskart and Nykaa. She became the face of Nykaa's "A Million Nakhras" campaign in 2022. Alaya was ranked 42nd in Times' 50 Most Desirable Women List of 2020. In 2023, Alaya was placed in Eastern Eye's "30 under 30 Asians" list.

== Filmography ==
=== Films ===
Year	Title	Role	Notes	Ref.
2020	Jawaani Jaaneman	Tia Singh		
2022	Freddy	Kainaaz Irani		
2023	Almost Pyaar with DJ Mohabbat	Amrita Suri / Ayesha Salim Phgura		
2023	U-Turn	Radhika Bakshi		
2024	Bade Miyan Chote Miyan	Dr. Parminder "Pam" Bawa		
2024	Srikanth	Veera Swathi		

=== Television ===
Year	Title	Role	Notes	Ref.
2011	Maa Exchange	Participant	Along with her mother Pooja Bedi	

=== Music video appearances ===
Year	Title	Singer	Ref.
2021	"Aaj Sajeya"	Goldie Sohel	

== Awards and nominations ==
Year	Award	Category	Work	Result	Ref.
2021	Filmfare Awards	Best Female Debut	Jawaani Jaaneman	Won	
2023	Bollywood Hungama Style Icons	Most Stylish Breakthrough Talent (Female)	—N/a	Nominated	
2024	Bollywood Hungama Style Icons	Most Stylish Solid Performer of the Year	—N/a	Won	
2025	Bollywood Hungama Style Icons	Most Stylish Trendsetter of the Year	—N/a	Won	
