= Jawaani Jaaneman =

2020 Indian Hindi-language family comedy film by Nitin Kakkar

- Theatrical release poster
- Directed by: Nitin Kakkar
- Written by: Hussain Dalal; Abbas Dalal
- Screenplay by: Juan Vera; Daniel Cúparo
- Based on: Igualita a mí by Diego Kaplan
- Produced by: Jackky Bhagnani; Deepshikha Deshmukh; Saif Ali Khan; Jay Shewakramani
- Starring: Saif Ali Khan; Alaya F Tabu
- Cinematography: Manoj Kumar Khatoi
- Edited by: Sachindra Vats; Chandan Arora
- Music by: Score: Ketan Sodha; Songs: Gourov-Roshin; Tanishk Bagchi; Prem-Hardeep
- Production companies: Pooja Entertainment; Black Knight Films; Northern Lights Films
- Distributed by: Pen Marudhar Entertainment
- Release date: 31 January 2020
- Running time: 115 minutes
- Country: India
- Language: Hindi
- Budget: ₹30–40 crore
- Box office: ₹44.77 crore

Jawaani Jaaneman (transl. Sweetheart Youth) is a 2020 Indian Hindi-language comedy-drama film directed by Nitin Kakkar and produced by Saif Ali Khan, Jackky Bhagnani, Deepshikha Deshmukh and Jay Shewakramani under Pooja Entertainment, Black Knight Films and Northern Lights Films. A remake of the 2010 Argentine comedy Igualita a mí, the film stars Khan and debutante Alaya F in the lead roles and explores the story of Jazz, a property broker and party-animal in London, who has to confront a daughter he never knew he had, who is also pregnant. Guest-starring Tabu, it was released theatrically in India on 31 January 2020.

== Plot ==
Jaswinder "Jazz" Singh (Saif Ali Khan) is a 40-year-old carefree womaniser who works in London as a property broker during the day with his brother Dimpy (Kumud Mishra) and parties at night in a bar owned by his friend Rajendra "Rocky" Sharma (Chunky Pandey), usually taking whichever girl agrees to go to his home for a one-night stand. Jazz, along with Dimpy, has to negotiate a multi-million-pound deal involving a property in Hounslow, but his aged landlady Mallika Zaid (Kamlesh Gill) refuses to part with her home due to an old tree, and his repeated attempts to convince her to give it up for the new construction do not succeed.

One night, Jazz is partying as usual when a girl spills her drink on him; she apologises and he carries on. The next night, at the bar, she reveals herself to him as Tia (Alaya F), a 21-year-old from Amsterdam who has come to London for some personal work, as she puts it. He agrees to take her to his home. There, Jazz learns from her that he is one of three possible options for her father, based on a photograph of Tia's mother with him. When she tells him that she might be his daughter, he is aghast, but she advises him to take a DNA test to confirm the results. When the results arrive, it transpires that not only is Tia Jazz's daughter, but she also happens to be pregnant.

A shocked Jazz initially refuses to accept the truth; when Tia offers to stay with him and deliver her baby at his home, he refuses, saying that he cannot take on the responsibility of running a family. She moves in next door to his house. He consults his hairdresser friend Rhea (Kubbra Sait), who is his age, for advice. She congratulates him and advises him to confront his being not only a father but also an impending grandfather. His reckless partying ways continue at personal expense, as once he falls from a bar table, drunk, and breaks his leg. His feelings for Rhea grow, but when he tries to make a sexual advance, she stops him and asks him to restrain himself from ruining their friendship.

Meanwhile, Tia visits Jazz at his home regularly, and silently resolves to endear herself to his family. One night Jazz's brother Dimpy and their parents visit his home. Despite Jazz warning her against it, Tia embraces everyone, and catches them unawares when she shows them her sonogram on Jazz's projector, forcing him to explain the situation. Jazz realizes after a conversation with Dimpy that he actually should take care of Tia, and the father-daughter duo reconciles. The two happily live through her pregnancy, until one day when Tia's hippie mother Ananya (Tabu) and Tia's boyfriend Rohan turn up from Amsterdam unannounced. Ananya and Rohan's hippie, drug-fuelled, wanton ways are too much for Jazz to handle, and he fears that this may impact Tia's delivery. Hurt by the final model of the construction in which the old tree is missing, she leaves; when Jazz confronts her, and attempts to convince her that the millions to be gained from the property will more than compensate for the lost tree, she tells him tearfully that he can't be her father, having not even an iota of emotion and attachment within himself.

A despondent Jazz ponders over whether the deal is really worth aggrieving an old lady, before he finally decides to call off the Hounslow project, even at the expense of money, to which Dimpy agrees. He then rushes to the Waterloo railway station where the three are waiting for their train; he proceeds to tell how he cancelled the deal and saved Mallika's tree, when Tia's water breaks suddenly.

The film ends with Rhea and Rocky joining the Singh family at Jazz's parents' home for Diwali celebrations. Jazz whispers into baby Kiara's ears that she will be the world's first baby to witness the wedding of both her parents and her grandfather, as Tia looks on happily.

== Cast ==
- Saif Ali Khan as Jaswinder "Jazz" Singh, Tia's father and Ananya's ex-boyfriend.
- Tabu as Ananya Singh, Tia's mother and Jazz's ex-girlfriend
- Alaya F as Tia Singh, Jazz and Ananya's daughter and Rohan's girlfriend
- Kubbra Sait as Rhea, Jazz's bestfriend and hair stylist.
- Chunky Pandey as Rajendra "Rocky" Sharma, Jazz's Best Friend
- Kumud Mishra as Dimpy Singh, Jazz's elder brother
- Farida Jalal as Jazz's mother
- Shavinder Mahal as Jazz's father
- Kamlesh Gill as Mrs. Mallika
- Dante Alexander as Rohan, Tia's boyfriend
- Kiku Sharda as Dr. Kriplani
- Rameet Sandhu as Tanvi
- Diljohn Singh as Grover, Jazz's Client
- Tea Wagner as Kiara
- Jazzy B as Himself in Gallan Kardi Song

== Production ==
=== Development ===
Saif Ali Khan started a new production houses laa in October 2018 to co-produce Jawaani Jaaneman with Jay Shewakramani. Saif wanted the avant-garde project in an alternative genre. In a statement, he said, "this is going to be as exciting as it gets. Jay and I have been planning this for a while now and with Jawaani Jaaneman, we found just the right project to produce together.” Alaya F, daughter of actress Pooja Bedi, making her debut is playing the role of his daughter. Tabu has been cast in an extended cameo role. Khan lost weight to fit into the character of a 40-year-old father.

=== Filming ===
The filming began in the second week of June 2019 with principal photography in London. Alaya finished the filming of the first schedule in August 2019. The film was eventually wrapped up on 24 August 2019.

== Soundtrack ==
Jawaani Jaaneman

Soundtrack album by Gourov-Roshin, Tanishk Bagchi and Prem-Hardeep
- Released: 23 January 2020
- Genre: Feature film soundtrack
- Length: 14:42
- Language: Hindi
- Label: Tips Music
- Producer: Jackky Bhagnani

This film’s soundtrack is composed by Gourov-Roshin, Tanishk Bagchi and Prem-Hardeep. The lyrics are written by Preet Harpal, Mumzy Stranger, Shabbir Ahmed, Devshi Khanduri and Shellee.

The song Gallan Kardi is a remake of the song Dil Luteya, written by Preet Harpal, composed by Sukshinder Shinda and sung by Jazzy B and Apache Indian.

The song "Ole Ole 2.0" from Yeh Dillagi (1994) was originally composed by Dilip Sen and Sameer Sen, with lyrics by Sameer Anjaan and sung by Abhijeet Bhattacharya and was recreated by Tanishk Bagchi with Shabbir Ahmed penning the revamped lyrics.

Track listing
No.	Title	Lyrics	Music	Singer(s)	Length
1.	"Gallan Kardi"	Preet Harpal, Mumzy Stranger	Prem-Hardeep	Jazzy B, Jyotica Tangri; Rap: Mumzy Stranger	3:14
2.	"Ole Ole 2.0"	Shabbir Ahmed	Tanishk Bagchi	Amit Mishra	2:25
3.	"Bandhu Tu Mera"	Devshi Khanduri	Gourov-Roshin	Yaser Desai	3:01
4.	"Mere Baabula"	Shellee	Gourov-Roshin	Harshdeep Kaur, Akhil Sachdeva	6:02
Total length:					14:42

== Release ==
The film was released theatrically on 31 January 2020.

=== Box office ===
Jawaani Jaaneman earned ₹3.24 crore at the domestic box-office on its opening day. On the second day, the film collected ₹4.55 crore. On the third day, the film collected ₹5.04 crore, taking its total opening weekend collection to ₹12.83 crore.

As of 13 March 2020, with a gross of ₹34.50 crore in India and ₹10.27 crore overseas, the film has a worldwide gross collection of ₹44.77 crore.

=== Critical reception ===
On the review aggregator website Rotten Tomatoes, 69% of 13 critics' reviews are positive, with an average rating of 6.3/10.

=== Awards and nominations ===
Year	Award	Category	Recipient	Result	Ref.
2021	66th Filmfare Awards	Best Female Debut	Alaya F	Won	
