= Hello Charlie =

2021 Indian film by Pankaj Saraswat

- Office release poster
- Directed by: Pankaj Saraswat
- Written by: Pankaj Saraswat; Abhishek Khairkar
- Produced by: Farhan Akhtar; Ritesh Sidhwani
- Starring: Jackie Shroff; Aadar Jain; Shhloka Pandit; Elnaaz Norouzi; Rajpal Yadav
- Cinematography: Andre Menezes
- Edited by: Chandan Arora; Mitesh Soni
- Music by: Score: John Stewart Eduri; Songs: Tanishk Bagchi; Gourov Dasgupta; Kanika Kapoor; Rishi Rich; Kiranee; Don D Marley
- Production company: Excel Entertainment
- Distributed by: Amazon Prime Video
- Release date: 9 April 2021
- Running time: 102 minutes
- Country: India
- Language: Hindi

Hello Charlie is an Indian Hindi-language comedy film written and directed by Pankaj Saraswat and produced by Farhan Akhtar and Ritesh Sidhwani under the Excel Entertainment banner. The film stars Jackie Shroff, Aadar Jain and debutante Shhloka Pandit with Elnaaz Norouzi and Rajpal Yadav in supporting roles. The film was released on 9 April 2021 on Amazon Prime Video.

== Plot ==
M. D. Makwana is a wanted fraudster who must escape from Mumbai after duping banks of a lot of money, for which his model girlfriend suggests disguising him as a caged gorilla so that he would be undiscovered, while at the same time, Toto, a real gorilla escapes from a crashed plane and is also declared wanted.

Chirag "Charlie" Rastogi is a young daydreamer from Indore who has been unsuccessful in whatever ventures he has partaken. Later, while at the disposition of his uncle Karsan (Darshan Jariwala), who leaves for Diu, he is assigned the job of escorting a gorilla to a circus by the model, little realizing that it is Makwana in disguise. Along the way, a series of adventures follows as Chirag finds himself confused between both Toto and Makwana, while a female circus acrobat-cum-dancer, Padma, tags along even as a forest ranger and a veterinary doctor are on the hunt for Toto.

== Cast ==
- Jackie Shroff as M. D. "Mac" Makwana, a wanted fraudster who disguises himself as Toto, the wanted gorilla, to escape the arms of the law.
- Aadar Jain as Chirag "Charlie" Rastogi, a young man from Indore who is assigned the task of escorting "Toto", in reality, a disguised Makwana, to the Diu Dusshera circus
- Shlokka Pandit as Padma Lakshmi, a circus acrobat-cum-dancer who joins Charlie
- Elnaaz Norouzi as Mona Malhotra, a model & Mac's girlfriend
- Rajpal Yadav as Ranger Solee Topi
- Girish Kulkarni as Priyesh Patel
- Siddhanth Kapoor as Inspector Jaidev “JD” Malhotra, Mona's brother
- Bramha Mishra as Ardali Ram Singh, Solee's partner
- Bharat Ganeshpure as Dr. Ganatra, a vet
- Darshan Jariwala as Karsan Patel, Charlie's uncle

== Production ==
The principal photography of the film started in mid-July 2020 during the pandemic.

== Soundtrack ==
Hello Charlie

Soundtrack album by Tanishk Bagchi, Gourov Dasgupta, Kanika Kapoor, Rishi Rich, Kiranee and Don D Marley
- Released: 30 March 2021
- Recorded: 2021
- Genre: Feature film soundtrack
- Length: 12:24
- Language: Hindi
- Label: Zee Music Company

Official audio
- Hello Charlie - Full Album on YouTube

The film's music was composed by Tanishk Bagchi, Gourov Dasgupta, Kanika Kapoor, Rishi Rich, Kiranee and Don D Marley and the lyrics are written by Vayu, Kumaar and Shellee, while John Stewart Eduri composed the background score.

Track listing
No.	Title	Lyrics	Music	Singer(s)	Length
1.	"One Two One Two Dance"	Vayu	Tanishk Bagchi	Nakash Aziz	3:36
2.	"Soneya Ve"	Kumaar	Kanika Kapoor	Kanika Kapoor, Jasbir Jassi	2:36
3.	"Gypsy Guitar"	Shellee	Gourov Dasgupta	Yasser Desai	3:31
4.	"Chandareya Chumka"	Kumaar	Rishi Rich, Kiranee, Don D Marley	Kiranee, Don D Marley, Simerjit Kumar	2:41
Total length:					12:24

== Release ==
The film was released on 9 April 2021 on Amazon Prime Video.
