= U-Turn (2023 film) =

2023 film by Arif Khan

- Official release poster
- Directed by: Arif Khan
- Written by: Parvez Sheikh; Radhika Anand
- Story by: Pawan Kumar
- Based on: U Turn (Kannada) by Pawan Kumar
- Produced by: Shobha Kapoor; Ekta Kapoor
- Starring: Alaya F; Priyanshu Painyuli; Aashim Gulati; Manu Rishi; Shreedhar Dubey; Apoorva Suman; Tariq Mir; Priyanka Arya
- Cinematography: Anubhav Bansal
- Music by: Score: Ketan Sodha; Songs: Jeet Gannguli; Arko Pravo Mukherjee; Sundeep Gosswami
- Production company: Balaji Telefilms
- Distributed by: ZEE5
- Release date: 28 April 2023
- Running time: 101 minutes
- Country: India
- Language: Hindi

U-Turn is a 2023 Indian Hindi-language supernatural thriller film directed by Arif Khan, written by Parvez Sheikh and Radhika Anand starring Alaya F, Priyanshu Painyuli, Aashim Gulati, Manu Rishi, and Rajesh Sharma in key roles. It is produced by Ekta Kapoor and Shobha Kapoor. It is an official remake of the 2016 Kannada film of the same name. This 2023 film is the seventh Indian-language remake of the Kannada original.

The film was released on 28 April 2023 on ZEE5.

== Plot ==
The film revolves around motorists who move concrete blocks from the divider to take a U-turn, which causes several accidents. It charts the story of a news intern named Radhika, who ends up being a primary suspect in a series of murders while working on a news story.

== Cast ==
- Alaya F as Radhika Bakshi
- Priyanshu Painyuli as Arjun Sinha
- Aashim Gulati as Aditya Iyer
- Manu Rishi as Indarjeet Singh Dhillon
- Rajesh Sharma as HSP Saxena
- Sahil Takhi
- Shreedhar Dubey
- Apoorva Suman
- Tariq Mir
- Priyanka Arya
- Grusha Kapoor as Radhika's mother
- Tasveer Kamil
- Japuji Kaur

== Soundtrack ==
U Turn

Soundtrack album by Jeet Gannguli, Arko Pravo Mukherjee and Sundeep Gosswami
- Released: 17 April 2023
- Genre: Feature film soundtrack
- Length: 21:27
- Language: Hindi
- Label: Zee Music Company

Official audio
- U Turn - Full Album on YouTube

The music for the film is composed by Jeet Gannguli, Arko Pravo Mukherjee, and Sundeep Gosswami. Lyrics are written by Kumaar, Rashmi Virag, Sundeep Gosswami and Kanchhan Srivas.

No.	Title	Lyrics	Music	Singer(S)	Length
1.	"Sajna"	Kumaar	Jeet Gannguli	Raj Barman	2:40
2.	"Raasta"	Rashmi Virag	Arko Pravo Mukherjee	Asit Tripathi	4:12
3.	"Sab Adhura"	Sundeep Gosswami & Kanchhan Srivas	Sundeep Gosswami	Sundeep Gosswami	3:30
4.	"Sajna (female)"	Kumaar	Jeet Gannguli	Prateeksha	2:41
5.	"Raaste (female)"	Rashmi Virag	Arko Pravo Mukherjee	Prateeksha	4.12
6.	"Raaste (reprise)"	Rashmi Virag	Arko Pravo Mukherjee	Raj Barman	4.12
Total length:					21:27

== Production ==
The shoot of the film started in July 2021 in Chandigarh. The film was wrapped by end of January 2022.

== Marketing ==
The trailer for the film was launched on April 13, 2023. Soon after the trailer launch, lead actress Alaya F stated that the film is an adaptation of the U Turn (2016 film) and not a remake. Director Arif Khan also called it an "inspiration" rather than a remake. He added while the plot of the Hindi film is similar to the Kannada film, the stories are different.

== Reception ==
On the review aggregator website Rotten Tomatoes, 29% of 7 critics' reviews are positive, with an average rating of 4.5/10.

Saibal Chatterjee of NDTV rated the film 2 stars out of 5 and wrote "the film makes an ill-advised U-turn in its final act."

Shubhra Gupta for The Indian Express rated the movie 1.5 star out of 5 and wrote "Even those who haven’t seen the Kannada film will find this one choppy: the source material is tight and twisty, so why make unnecessary changes in the remake?"

Reviewing for Rediff.com, Deepa Gahlot felt the film bizarre and wrote "There are long sequences of a wide-eyed Radhika being terrorised in her apartment, but then the explanation for it all is completely bizarre and far-fetched."

Gopinath Rajendran for The Hindu wrote "Remakes might feel like safer bets but they come with unique challenges that have to be handled well for the new product to stand on its own. But for reasons unknown, Hindi cinema has been on a remaking spree and in most cases, this hasn’t worked in their favour."

Pinkvilla praised the supernatural-thriller film U-Turn, with special mention for Alaya F's performance. According to Jogani, the film was concise, efficient, and highly engaging. The narrative's pacing held the audience's attention throughout, with strong performances from the entire cast. Overall, U-Turn is a must-watch for those who appreciate gripping storytelling and exceptional acting.

On April 28, 2023, Hindustan Times published a review of the film which received positive feedback from Monika Kukreja. Kukreja specifically highlighted Alaya F's performance as a journalist who delved into the dangers of a hazardous road.

Simran Srivastav of Jagran wrote "Alaya F as Radhika Bakshi gives an earnest performance in the film but does not get enough chance to show off her acting chops. Priyanshu Painyuli is convincing as Senior Inspector Arjun Sinha and complements Alaya on the screen very well".

A critic from Scroll.in wrote "The Hindi remake, written by Parvez Sheikh and Radhika Anand, makes a few welcome changes to the source material. Routinely performed and staged, U-Turn bumbles along on its gimmicky premise and the promise of smart twists at judiciously placed intervals".
