= Freddy (film) =

2022 Indian film by Shashanka Ghosh

- Official release poster
- Directed by: Shashanka Ghosh
- Written by: Parveez Shaikh
- Produced by: Ekta Kapoor; Shobha Kapoor; Jay Shewakramani; Gaurav Bose
- Starring: Kartik Aaryan; Alaya F
- Cinematography: Ayananka Bose
- Edited by: Chandan Arora
- Music by: Songs: Pritam; Score: Clinton Cerejo
- Production companies: Balaji Motion Pictures; NH Studioz; Northern Lights Films
- Distributed by: Disney+ Hotstar
- Release date: 2 December 2022
- Running time: 124 minutes
- Country: India
- Language: Hindi

Freddy is a 2022 Indian Hindi-language psychological thriller film directed by Shashanka Ghosh and produced by Ekta Kapoor, Shobha Kapoor, Gaurav Bose, and Jay Shewakramani under Balaji Motion Pictures, NH Studioz, and Northern Lights. The film stars Kartik Aaryan in the title role, alongside Alaya F.

The film was released on 2 December 2022 through the streaming platform Disney+ Hotstar.

== Plot ==
Dr. Freddy Ginwala is a shy and socially awkward dentist in Mumbai. He repeatedly dates women, and is always rejected. His only friend is his pet tortoise, Hardy, and he also spends his leisure time working on his miniature planes. When he was a child, his father killed his mother and then killed himself. His aunt, Persis, has been his guardian since then.

At a relative's wedding, Freddy sees a girl named Kainaaz and awkwardly approaches her to talk to her, but is pushed away by her rich husband, Rustom, who was handling the catering for the wedding. Kainaaz meets Freddy at his clinic the next day, saying she wants to have her wisdom tooth extracted. Freddy carries out the surgery the next day. He soon falls in love with her. He goes near her house to catch a glimpse of her and sees her being beaten by Rustom. Freddy calls her the next day, insisting she visit him so that he can check if she is healing properly post-surgery. He questions her about the wounds on her face, and she reveals that Rustom is abusive towards her and would kill her if she ever leaves him. They start dating secretly, and she reciprocates his feelings. They plan to get married and kill Rustom.

Freddy kills him by running him over with his car and goes straight to his farmhouse in Karjat and stays there for a week, also getting the damaged vehicle repaired. The police cannot find any evidence related to Rustom's death. On returning, Freddy meets Kainaaz at her home but is shocked to see her with Raymond, a chef. Kainaaz reveals to Freddy that she never loved him and only used him to have her husband killed so that she and Raymond could be together and become the owners of the restaurant previously owned by her husband. Freddy is devastated. Seeking revenge, he sneaks into Kainaaz's house and replaces her facewash with liquid dishwasher detergent, as Kainaaz had previously mentioned being allergic to sodium sulfate. He also removes the brake fluid from Raymond's car. Kainaaz wakes up to find her skin covered in rashes due to the allergy. Raymond drives her to the hospital, but due to the brakes being faulty, they suffer an accident and are injured.

The next day, they find that someone has posted an online review of her restaurant, complaining of a lizard being found in the food, tarnishing its reputation. An obscene photo of them has also been leaked online. Kainaaz is convinced that Freddy is behind all this. They go to his house and beat him, but the police arrive there, as Freddy had informed them beforehand. They reveal to the police that Freddy had killed Rustom but cannot provide any proof, as Freddy had sneaked into Kainaaz's house and secretly deleted all his photos and messages from their phones while they slept. They later break into Freddy's house while he is away and kill Hardy, leaving him heartbroken. An eyewitness to Rustom's murder reveals Freddy's car number to the police, though he had not seen the driver's face. When the police come to interrogate Freddy, he lies that in order to frame him, Raymond had taken his car to kill Rustom and proves it by showing false messages that he had himself secretly sent from Kainaaz's phone to his phone and the CCTV footage of them breaking into his house.

Freddy calls Kainaaz and Raymond and says that the police will be coming for them and that he will spare them if they come and apologize to him at his farmhouse. He also asks them to bring a suitcase along with them. The police see the CCTV footage of them leaving the house with the suitcase and assume they have absconded. At the farmhouse, they attempt to kill Freddy, but he overpowers and captures them. He then brutally extracts both of their teeth without anesthesia, resulting in their deaths. As Freddy buries Kainaaz, he tells her a final joke, saying he "still loves her." He lies down between the two buried bodies and the screen goes black.

== Cast ==
- Kartik Aaryan as Dr. Freddy Ginwala
- Alaya F as Kainaaz Cruz Irani
- Karan Pandit as Raymond Nariman
- Sajjad Delafrooz as Rustom Irani
- Jeniffer Piccinato as Ava Unawalla
- Harshika Kewalramani as Shirin Mistry
- Tripti Agarwal as Rosanne Cruz
- Ashit Kumar as Shankar

== Production ==
=== Development ===
In July 2021, it was announced that Kartik Aaryan would be starring in a thriller directed by Shashanka Ghosh and produced by Ekta Kapoor and Jay Shewakramani. For his role of a dentist, Aaryan had to gain 14 kg. Alaya F was cast in a negative role.

=== Filming ===
Principal photography began on 4 August 2021. Many scenes were filmed in Panchgani. The production was wrapped up on 29 September 2021.

== Music ==
The music of the film is composed by Pritam, while the background score is composed by Clinton Cerejo. The first single titled "Kaala Jaadu" was released on 11 November 2022. The second single titled "Tum Jo Milo" was released on 21 November 2022.

All lyrics are written by Irshad Kamil.

Track listing
No.	Title	Singer(s)	Length
1.	"Kaala Jaadu"	Arijit Singh, Nikhita Gandhi	3:32
2.	"Tum Jo Milo"	Abhijeet Srivastava	3:25
3.	"Tujhse Pyaar Karta Hoon"	Raghav Chaitanya	2:34
Total length:			9:31

== Marketing ==
The official poster of Kartik Aaryan and Alaya F were released on 28 October 2022 and 17 November 2022 respectively. The teaser of the film was released on 7 November 2022.

== Reception ==
=== Critical response ===
Aaryan's performance was praised by critics. On the review aggregator website Rotten Tomatoes, 29% of 7 critics' reviews are positive, with an average rating of 4/10.

Bollywood Hungama rated the film 4 out of 5 stars and wrote "Freddy boasts of a great plot and first-rate execution with Kartik Aaryan delivering the best performance of his career". Rohit Bhatnagar of The Free Press Journal rated the film 4 out of 5 stars and wrote "Freddy is engaging in the first half, though the second half compels to bore with a series of revenges, they remain true to the film and the genre. Watch out for Kartik’s unusual performance". Eshita Bhargava of The Financial Express rated the film 4 out of 5 stars and wrote "From the screenplay and cinematography to the direction and acting, Freddy is a must-watch. Kartik Aaryan has once again given us an excellent performance, proving that he can play any character and cannot be stereotyped". Pragya Jha of ABP News rated the film 4 out of 5 stars and wrote "After watching this movie, one can say that there has been a welcome shift in recent Hindi films toward crime thrillers. Watch this film to see Kartik Aaryan in a whole new light!". Chirag Sehgal of News 18 rated the film 3.5 out of 5 stars and wrote "Freddy is worth watching. You’ll enjoy the curiosity that the film invokes. You will surely like Kartik Aaryan in an entirely new avatar. Alaya F is the cherry on the cake. By the end of the film, you might fear visiting a dentist ever again, but that’s the fun!". Ankita Bhandari of Zee News rated the film 3.5 out of 5 stars and praised the suspense drama for "Kartik's brilliant acting, gripping tale, edgy plot, amazing direction and unpredictable climax!". Mehak Sabharwal of Zoom rated the film 3.5 out of 5 stars and termed the film as "good watch" and wrote, You get to see a new version of Kartik, which is very different from the films he has done before. The film deserves your time.

Renuka Vyavahare of The Times of India rated the film 3 out of 5 stars and wrote "Freddy is fairly engaging and unsettling but it wavers to go all out. The film starts off well but doesn’t reach its full potential". Tushar Joshi of India Today rated the film 3 out of 5 stars and wrote "Freddy is dark and twisted. Watch it if you want to take a break from the candy floss version of Kartik Aaryan and see him attempt something different". Devesh Sharma of Filmfare rated the film 3 out of 5 stars and wrote "The film is a slow burner for sure. A lot of time is spent building up Freddy’s character. He’s shown to be most comfortable around his tools, losing himself in his job and earning the trust of his patients". Avinash Lohana of Pinkvilla rated the film 3 out of 5 stars and wrote "Freddy rides on performances and the gripping second half of the movie". Umesh Punwani of Koimoi rated the film 3.5 out of 5 stars and wrote "From ‘Pyaar Ka Punchnama’ To ‘Nafrat Ka Punchnama’, Kartik Aaryan masters the art of balancing being an actor & a star."
