= Pooja Bedi =

Indian actress (born 1970)

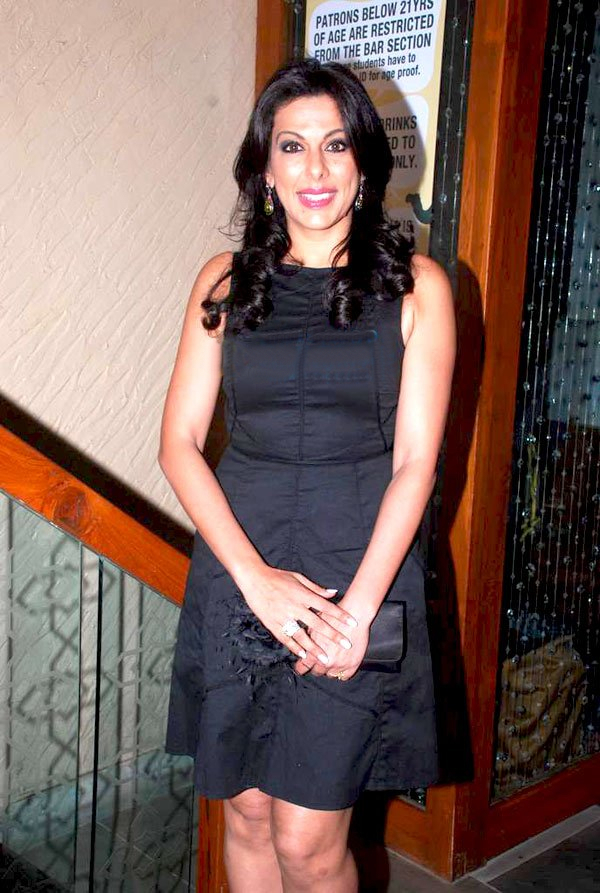
- Bedi in 2019
- Born: 11 May 1970 (age 56); Bombay, Maharashtra, India
- Other name: Noorjahan
- Education: Lawrence School, Sanawar
- Occupations: Actress; television presenter; relationship columnist
- Years active: 1991–2020
- Spouse: Farhan Ebrahim Furniturewala (m. 1994; div. 2003)
- Children: 2, including Alaya F
- Parents: Kabir Bedi (father); Protima Bedi (mother)
- Family: Freda Bedi (grandmother)

Pooja Bedi (born 11 May 1970) is an Indian actress, television talk show host and newspaper columnist. She is the daughter of Indian actors Kabir Bedi and Protima Bedi. She appeared in the reality television shows Jhalak Dikhhla Jaa, Nach Baliye, Fear Factor: Khatron Ke Khiladi and Bigg Boss.

== Early life ==
Pooja Bedi was born 11 May 1970 in Bombay (present-day Mumbai) to the late Indian classical dancer Protima and actor Kabir Bedi. She is of Punjabi Sikh and British English ancestry on her father's side and Bengali and Haryanvi ancestry on her mother's side. She was brought up in what she calls a "bohemian progressive artistic environment".

== Career ==
=== Career beginnings (1991–2006) ===
From 1991 to 1995, Bedi worked in Bollywood films and appeared in many commercials and campaigns, notably the KamaSutra condom campaign which she endorsed and used as a vehicle to raise awareness of AIDS.

She made her film debut with Jag Mundhra's film Vishkanya (1991). She went on to act in Jo Jeeta Wohi Sikander (1992) with Aamir Khan. Her other films include Lootere (1993) and Aatank Hi Aatank (1995).

=== Debut in reality shows and beyond (2006–2020) ===
In 2000, she compiled and edited Timepass, the memoirs of her mother Protima Bedi. She has been a columnist with the Times of India, the Hindustan Times, and MiD DAY newspapers, and has written articles for numerous publications, including L'officiel, Femina and The Week.

In 2006, Bedi appeared in Jhalak Dikhhla Jaa in its first season followed by Fear Factor: Khatron Ke Khiladi. In 2007, Bedi along with Hanif Hilal appeared in Nach Baliye. In 2011, Bedi was a celebrity contestant in the fifth season of the Indian version of the reality TV show Big Brother, Bigg Boss. She was evicted after surviving for 8 weeks in the house, which was Day 56 (27 November).

== Personal life ==
Bedi married Farhan Furniturewala a Khoja Gujarati Muslim, whom she met in 1990. They were married 6 May 1994 and Bedi converted to Islam upon marriage taking up the name Noorjahan. They have two children, including Alaya Furniturewala. Bedi and Farhan divorced in 2003. In February 2019, Bedi became engaged to Maneck Contractor.

== Filmography ==
Year	Title	Role	Language	Notes
1991	Vishkanya	Nisha Varma/Munni Lead role	Hindi	
1992	Jo Jeeta Wohi Sikandar	Supporting role	Hindi	Nominated – Filmfare Award for Best Supporting Actress
1993	Lootere	Supporting role	Hindi	
1993	Chittemma Mogudu	Supporting role	Telugu	
1993	Phir Teri Kahani Yaad Aayee	Supporting role	Hindi	
1995	Aatank Hi Aatank	Guest	Hindi	
2011	Shakti	Faqtooni	Telugu	
2020	Comedy Couple	Zohra	Hindi	

=== Television ===
Year	Show	Role
2006	Jhalak Dikhhla Jaa 1	Contestant (evicted in 1st week)
2007	Nach Baliye 3	7th place
2008	Bigg Boss 2	Guest Host
2008	Fear Factor: Khatron Ke Khiladi 1	Contestant (4th runner up)
2011	Maa Exchange	Episodic role -
2011	Bigg Boss 5	(Contestant) Evicted on Day 56
2020	Masaba Masaba	Geeta Chopra (Extended cameo)
