= Srikanth (film) =

2024 Indian film by Tushar Hiranandani

- Theatrical release poster
- Directed by: Tushar Hiranandani
- Written by: Jagdeep Sidhu; Sumit Purohit
- Produced by: Bhushan Kumar; Krishan Kumar; Nidhi Parmar Hiranandani
- Starring: Rajkummar Rao; Jyothika; Alaya F Sharad Kelkar
- Cinematography: Pratham Mehta
- Edited by: Debasmita Mitra; Sanjay Sankla
- Music by: Songs: Anand–Milind; Tanishk Bagchi; Sachet–Parampara; Ved Sharma; Aditya Dev; Background Score: Ishaan Chhabra
- Production companies: Chalk and Cheese Films; T-Series Films
- Distributed by: AA Films
- Release date: 10 May 2024
- Running time: 134 minutes
- Country: India
- Language: Hindi
- Budget: ₹35 crore (Note: According to Pinkvilla, Srikanth is made on a budget of Rs 27 crore, which includes Rajkummar Rao’s acting fees of Rs 10 crore, and a further Rs 8 crore spent on print and publicity.)
- Box office: est. ₹62.92 crore

Srikanth is a 2024 Indian Hindi-language biographical film on the life of Srikanth Bolla, a visually-impaired industrialist and the founder of Bollant Industries. Starring Rajkummar Rao in the title role, it is directed by Tushar Hiranandani and co-stars Jyothika, Alaya F and Sharad Kelkar.

The film was shot in two months at various locations of India and United States, between November 2022 to January 2023. The film was released theatrically on 10 May 2024, on the occasion of Akshay Tritiya, to positive reviews from critics and emerged as a modest commercial success.

== Plot ==
The Hindi language biopic tells the story of Srikanth Bolla, an Indian entrepreneur, who gained prominence as the founder of Bollant Industries, a company created in 2012 to employ unskilled and disabled individuals in creating eco-friendly products. The film chronicles the struggles of Srikanth, who was born visually impaired in Seetharamapuram village in Machilipatnam, in then undivided Andhra Pradesh, India. The film demonstrates Srikanth's achievements despite adverse situations. The day he was born the delight of the father who named his son after cricketer Krishnamachari Srikkanth turns into dismay when he sees sightless newborn. He digs a hole to bury him but is saved by his mother. He also has to endure bullying in the local school despite his brilliance.

The plot moves to Hyderabad where he joins a special school where he shines, but his arrogance results in him being thrown out. From then on he is mentored by his teacher Devika who hand-holds him while keeping his ego in check. She helps him file a court case to study science as a subject (despite scoring 98%). She prompts him to try to apply abroad, and on doing so he gets selected as the first international visually impaired student at Massachusetts Institute of Technology in the United States after being denied entry into Indian Institute of Technology. When moving to the US, he briefly gets stopped at the airport as the airline cannot have a visually impared person travel alone, however he is able to prove his knowledge about the plane and how to board and sit and is eventually allowed entry. At MIT he gets support of 2 students who help him achieve his dreams. During his college days, through social media he meets Swati who is fascinated by him. After graduation, Swati, now his girlfriend prompts him to realise his dreams by returning to India. Again his mentor helps him to start a computer institute which flops. Later he decides to set up a business (Bollant Industries) with his business partner Ravi Mantha, where he gives jobs mostly to the disabled. After a few problems with his partner, fueled by Srikanth’s egoistic attitude, Srikanth apologizes and learns to be humble. He is finally able to achieve the level of success he hoped for, with continued guidance from his mentor. This reflected in the tagline Aa Raha Hai Sabki Aankhen Kholne.

== Cast ==
- Rajkummar Rao as Srikanth Bolla
  - Srikant Manna and Arnav Abdagire as young Srikanth Bolla
- Jyothika as Devika Malvade, Sri's teacher and mentor
- Alaya F as Veera Swathi, Sri's love interest
- Sharad Kelkar as Ravi Mantha, Sri's investor and friend
- Jameel Khan as A. P. J. Abdul Kalam
- Srinivas Beesetty as Damodar Bolla, Sri's father
- Anusha Nuthula as Venkatamma Bolla, Sri's mother
- Bharat Jadhav as Magistrate
- Sridhar Murthy as Venugopal Rao
- Sukhita Aiyyar as Vidya Reddy
- Vinita Venugopal as Kavitha Mantha, Ravi's wife
- Om Kanojiya as Young Mahesh
- Sasidhar Kocherlakota as Mahesh
- Aarav Khot as Narendra Bolla, Sri's younger brother
  - Akshay Chaudhary as young Narendra Bolla
- Clarissa Saaiman as Kelly, Sri's friend at MIT
- Siboniso Tadeus Mbatha as Edward, Sri's friend at MIT
- Arnav Bansal as Vishnu
- Arun Malik as Convent school principal
- Saurav Joshi as School teacher
- Vivek Mishra (special appearance)
- Hansal Mehta (special appearance)
- Srikanth Bolla (special appearance)
- Ravi Mantha (special appearance)
- Sanat Deshpande as 12 years old Thomas
- Rajnish Sharma as Electricity officer
- Aman Kanojia as Classmate
- Mayank Parakh as Haldiram owner

== Production ==
=== Development ===
A biopic on the life of Srikanth Bolla was announced in January 2022, with Rajkummar Rao in the lead. The film was initially titled SRI, which was later changed to Srikanth. The film's director Tushar revealed that the first film he wanted to make was about Srikanth Bolla, but this was not possible as Bolla was too busy with his work to find time to meet him. Then he approached Bolla through his business partner, Ravi Mantha. Mantha (played by Sharad Kelkar in the film) was also instrumental in getting Tushar the rights to make the film on Bolla, who had initially given the rights to another Bollywood director (Rakeysh Omprakash Mehra). Mantha met with Mehra, who readily gave the rights to Tushar as he was not ready to make the film at that time.

=== Filming ===
Principal photography commenced in November 2022, and filming concluded in January 2023. Jyothika made a comeback to Hindi cinema with the film. She had initially rejected her role, but later agreed to do the film after being convinced by her husband, Suriya. To prepare for the role during filming, lead actor Rajkummar Rao wore special lens from morning till evening. He also spent time with visually impaired individuals to refine his performance. The film stands as the first-ever all-inclusive Hindi movie, providing roles to over 70 actors with disabilities.

== Marketing ==
The official trailer was released on 10 April 2024. As part of the film's promotional campaign, Rao visited Swarnim University, and also attended a cultural program hosted by Blind People's Association that works for upliftment of visually impaired. He also felicitated around 12 to 15 visually impaired entrepreneurs of Gujarat. A promotional event was held at The Victoria Memorial School for the Blind in Mumbai, in the presence of Srikanth Bolla. The song "Papa Kehte Hain" from the film was launched at an event at St. Andrew's College in Mumbai, in the presence of actor Aamir Khan and singer Udit Narayan.

== Soundtrack ==
Srikanth

Soundtrack album by Tanishk Bagchi, Sachet–Parampara, Aditya Dev and Ved Sharma
- Released: 13 May 2024
- Recorded: 2023
- Genre: Feature film soundtrack
- Length: 20:43
- Language: Hindi
- Label: T-Series

Official audio
- Srikanth - Full Album on YouTube

The music of this film is composed by Anand–Milind, Aditya Dev and Sachet–Parampara while lyrics are written by Shloke Lal, Majrooh Sultanpuri, Yogesh Dubey and Kunaal Vermaa. Music for "Papa Kehte Hain" from Qayamat Se Qayamat Tak is rendered by Aditya Dev, it was originally sung by Udit Narayan with lyrics by Majrooh Sultanpuri. "Papa Kehte Hain" was launched by Aamir Khan on 22 April 2024.

Track listing
No.	Title	Lyrics	Music	Singer(s)	Length
1.	"Tu Mil Gaya"	Shloke Lal	Tanishk Bagchi	Jubin Nautiyal, Tulsi Kumar	4:30
2.	"Papa Kehte Hain"	Majrooh Sultanpuri	Aditya Dev	Udit Narayan	4:42
3.	"Tumhe Hi Apna Maana Hai"	Yogesh Dubey	Sachet–Parampara	Sachet Tandon, Parampara Thakur	3:45
4.	"Jeena Sikha De"	Kunaal Vermaa	Ved Sharma	Arijit Singh	4:30
5.	"Jeena Sikha De" (Unplugged)	Kunaal Vermaa	Ved Sharma	Ved Sharma	3:17
Total length:					20:43

== Release ==
=== Theatrical ===
The film was released in theatres on 10 May 2024 with special screenings at 10 am with reduced ticket prices. National Centre for Promotion of Employment for Disabled People (NCPEDP) and PVR INOX collaborated to make the film more accessible to audiences with disabilities, through specialised formats that cater to those with visual and hearing impairments. To ensure accessibility for the film, PVR INOX earmarked 1600 wheelchair-friendly seats across various locations to accommodate patrons with disabilities.

=== Home media ===
The digital streaming rights of the film were acquired by Netflix for ₹20 crore. The satellite rights of the film were sold to Sony Networks for 7 crores. The film was premiered on Netflix from 5 July 2024.

== Reception ==
=== Box office ===
The film earned ₹11.95 net crore in India on its first weekend. Thanks to word of mouth publicity and positive reviews, the box office run of the film continues; and as of 17 June 2024, the film has grossed ₹59.58 crore in India and ₹3.34 crore internationally, for a total worldwide gross of ₹62.92 crore.

=== Review ===
Srikanth received positive reviews from critics. On the review aggregator website Rotten Tomatoes, 78% of 9 critics' reviews are positive, with an average rating of 6.8/10.

A critic for Bollywood Hungama rated the film 4.5 stars out of 5 and wrote "On the whole, Srikanth is an inspiring tale told in an entertaining manner and is also laced with an award-winning performance by Rajkummar Rao."

Dhaval Roy of The Times of India rated the film 4 stars out of 5 and wrote "Breaking the biopic mold, Srikanth offers a refreshingly honest portrayal that celebrates potential over glorification. It will leave you feeling inspired and sparing a thought for those with disabilities who deserve human dignity and equal opportunities like all of us!".

Sana Farzeen of India Today rated the film 4 stars out of 5 and wrote "The real hero of the film is not only Srikanth Bolla, but also the beautiful script. Brownie points to director Tushar Hiranandani, who has once again aced the biopic genre after Saand Ki Aankh and Scam 2003. He never tries to paint the protagonist as the hero here, and that's what creates true magic."

Mayur Sanap of Rediff.com rated 2.5/5 stars and notes "Rajkummar Rao does the best with what he is given and he ably elevates the generic story-telling. Too bad that his performance remains the only takeaway from such an inspiring real-life story".

Dishya Sharma of News18 rated the film 3.5 stars out of 5 and wrote "The film completely rests on Rajkummar Rao's shoulder. He has put himself outside his comfort zone to ace the nuances of the character."

Ganesh Aaglave of Firstpost rated the film 3.5 stars out of 5 and wrote "On the whole, Srikanth is a film, which deserves an audience and their attention for its inspiring and spectacular craft."

== Accolades ==
Year	Award	Category	Nominee/Work	Result	Ref.
2024	72nd National Film Awards	Best Hindi Feature Film	Tushar Hiranandani	Won	
2025	25th IIFA Awards	Best Actor	Rajkummar Rao	Nominated	
2025	25th IIFA Awards	Best Supporting Actress	Jyothika	Nominated	
2025	Showsha Reel Awards 2025	Showsha Reel Awards 2025 for Best Supporting Actress - Popular Choice	Jyothika	Won	
2025	70th Filmfare Awards	Best Actor (Critic)	Rajkummar Rao	Won	
2025	70th Filmfare Awards	Best Adapted Screeplay	Jagdeep Sidhu, Sumit Porohit	Nominated	
