= Ravi Mantha =

Indian businessman

- Born: Ravi Kanth Mantha; 1972 or 1973; Hyderabad, India
- Education: University of Puget Sound (BBA)
- Spouse: Kavitha Mantha
- Children: 2

Ravi Kanth Mantha (born 1972 or 1973) is an Indian businessman, investor, author, and former economic and political advisor.

== Early life and education ==
Mantha was born and raised in Hyderabad, India where he attended The Hyderabad Public School, Ramanthapur. Mantha earned a bachelor's degree in business administration from the University of Puget Sound in 1994. He also earned the CFA (chartered financial analyst) charter from the CFA Institute (previously known as AIMR), in 1997.

== Career ==
In 2001, Mantha began working at Fidelity Investments as a portfolio manager for a fund worth around $1 billion. Mantha continued working at Fidelity till 2011, and by then the fund had grown to $34 billion.

In 2012, Mantha met Srikanth Bolla in Hyderabad after being introduced by a common friend. Together, Bolla and Mantha would found Bollant Industries, an organization that employs uneducated and disabled employees to manufacture eco-friendly packaging solutions. In 2016, Bollant received backing from billionaire Ratan Tata. As of 2022, Bollant Industries was worth an estimated £48 million.

In 2013, Mantha published his first book, All About Bacteria with HarperCollins.

In 2014, Mantha was a political advisor to the Bharatiya Janata Party. Mantha assisted Narendra Modi with his 2014 election strategy. The same year, Mantha published A Journey: Poems by Narendra Modi, translating Modi's poetry from Gujarati to English.

In 2015, Mantha published his third book, The Baby Elephant Diet: A Modern Indian Guide to Eating Right.

Mantha and his wife Kavitha own and operate the Baby Elephant Farm, a 17-acre food forest in Shankarpally, Telangna along with Sage Sustainable Living, a store selling raw produce from their farm and Sage Farm Cafe, an organic restaurant in Hyderabad.

== In popular culture ==
In 2022, a biopic film Srikanth, featuring Rajkummar Rao in the lead role of Srikanth Bolla was announced with Sharad Kelkar playing the supporting role of Ravi Mantha. The film released on 10 May 2024 with Kelkar's performance as Mantha being generally praised.
