= Telangana Apartments (Promotion of Construction and Ownership) Act, 1987 =

Telangana legislation concerning apartment construction and ownership

Andhra Pradesh Legislative Assembly
- Territorial extent: Telangana
- Enacted by: Andhra Pradesh Legislative Assembly
- Assented to: 15 May 1987

Related legislation
- ACT NO. 29 OF 1987
- Status: In force

The Telangana Apartments (Promotion of Construction and Ownership) Act, 1987 (Act No. 29 of 1987) is state legislation concerning the construction, promotion and ownership of apartments in Telangana, India. It was originally enacted as the Andhra Pradesh Apartments (Promotion of Construction and Ownership) Act, 1987, before being adapted to Telangana following the Andhra Pradesh Reorganisation Act, 2014.

The legislation addresses the obligations of promoters, apartment ownership, common areas and facilities, undivided interests, common expenses and the administration of apartment properties.

== Legislative history ==
The Act was originally enacted by the undivided state of Andhra Pradesh as the Andhra Pradesh Apartments (Promotion of Construction and Ownership) Act, 1987 (Act No. 29 of 1987). It received the assent of the President of India on 15 May 1987.

Following the formation of Telangana on 2 June 2014, the legislation was adapted to the new state under section 101 of the Andhra Pradesh Reorganisation Act, 2014. G.O.Ms.No.45, Law (F) Department, dated 1 June 2016, substituted the name of Telangana in the Act and adapted its territorial references.

== Provisions ==
=== Application and definitions ===
Section 2 specifies the application of the Act. Its provisions, except those in Chapter III, apply to every property within its scope. Chapter III applies to a property when the sole owner or all owners submit it to that chapter by executing and registering a Declaration in accordance with the Act.

Section 3 defines terms used in the legislation, including apartment, association of apartment owners, building, common areas and facilities, common expenses, declaration and promoter.

=== Duties and liabilities of promoters ===
Chapter II sets out the duties and liabilities of promoters.

These provisions include requirements relating to disclosure of information, agreements before accepting advance payments, restrictions on alterations after disclosure of plans and the conveyance of title according to the agreement.

=== Apartment ownership and common areas ===
Chapter III deals with special facilities and the legal framework for apartment ownership where a property has been submitted to the chapter through a Declaration.

Section 8 provides for an apartment to be transferable and heritable property. Section 9 addresses common areas and facilities, while section 10 concerns compliance with applicable bye-laws and covenants.

The Act defines common areas and facilities to include, among other things, the land, structural elements of buildings, roofs and terraces, corridors, stairways, parking areas, gardens, lifts, water installations and other facilities intended for common use.

=== Common expenses and undivided interest ===
Section 13 provides that common profits and common expenses are to be distributed or charged among apartment owners according to their respective percentages of undivided interest in the common areas and facilities. The Act does not prescribe one universal maintenance-rate formula for every association; the applicable declaration and bye-laws matter.

Section 14 specifies the information to be included in the Declaration, including the description of the land and building, the individual apartments, common areas and facilities, and the percentage of undivided interest associated with each apartment.

=== Association of apartment owners ===
Section 18 provides for bye-laws governing the administration of property submitted to Chapter III. These bye-laws address the formation of the association of apartment owners, election of its board of managers, meetings, office-bearers, financial records, collection of common expenses and maintenance of common areas and facilities.

Section 21 of the act empowers the manager or board of managers of an apartment owners' association to cut off, withhold, curtail, or reduce essential supplies or services to an apartment owner for just and sufficient cause. The association must provide a due notice of not less than seven days before taking any action. This can be applied when a flat owner defaults on paying common maintenance charges or dues.

Section 31 provides for the Act, Declaration and bye-laws to bind apartment owners, tenants and other persons using property submitted to Chapter III, subject to the provisions of the section.

== See also ==
- Real Estate (Regulation and Development) Act, 2016
- Andhra Pradesh Reorganisation Act, 2014
- Apartment
- Condominium
- Resident welfare association
