= Little Baby (film) =

2019 Indian film

Little Baby is an Indian drama film, based on communication gap between Indian parents and their children. The film is about a father who tries to solve problem with his daughter by understanding her and dealing with affection. The film stars Priyanshu Chatterjee and Gulnaz Siganporia, was directed by Shekhar S Jha and produced by Rinku Singh. Little Baby was released on 27 September 2019. The film has been shot in the city of Dehradun, Uttrakhand. In the film Priyanshu Chatterjee plays Dushyant, a police officer and father.

== Cast ==
- Priyanshu Chatterjee as Inspector Dushyant Singh, SSP
- Gulnaz Siganporia as Shasha
