= Shellee =

- Origin: Chandigarh, India
- Occupations: Lyricist, Writer

Shailender Singh Sodhi, commonly known as Shellee, is an Indian poet, film lyricist and writer. He commonly works in Bollywood. He was born in Chandigarh, India.

== Early life ==
His father Himmat Singh Sodhi, is a poet and a writer.

Shellee wrote poetry and stories from an early age. After studying at DAV School, Ambala cantonment, he studied theater from Ambala Cantt and Panjab University, Chandigarh. In 1995 he moved to Mumbai to assist Gulzar. Though he wanted to act, he was not a skilled actor.

He was a Censor Board member for four years. In 2008, Anurag Kashyap approached him to write the lyrics for Dev.D. Known for introducing new words in his lyrics, he rose to fame quickly.

He says he got the name "Shellee", when one of his teachers, who was a fan of English poet PB Shelley, started calling him Shelley. The nickname later became 'Shellee.'

== Career ==
He has worked as lyricist and background music composer for various Bollywood films including the critically acclaimed Dev D. and Udta Punjab. He is working on a documentary film on the Hakka community living in Kolkata for many generations.

== As Lyricist ==
Year	Film	Songs	Notes
2009	Dev.D	Maahi Menu Pardesi Dhol Yaara Dhol Hiknaal Ranjhana	
2011	Bheja Fry 2	Banjaare	
2013	3G	Khalbali	
2016	Udta Punjab	Da Da Dasse Chita Ve Hass Nach Le Vadiya	
2016	Fan	Ghaint Fan - Punjabi Version	
2017	Phillauri	Dum Dum Punjabi Version	
2018	Manmarziyaan	Kundali Bijlee Giregi Jaisi Teri Marzi Sachi Mohabbat Haila Chonch Ladhiyaan Dhayaanchaand Grey Wala Shade Daarya F For Fyaar	
2018	Veere Di Wedding	Pappi Le Loon	
2018	3 Storeys	Azaadiyaan	
2019	Little Baby	Take It Easy	
2020	AT Azaad	Raadhe (Songs of Faith) Pavansutt (Songs of Faith) Jump (Songs of Dance) Dilli Di Kudhiyaan (Songs of Dance)	
2020	Jai Mummy Di	Jai Mummy Di (Title Track)	
2020	Waah Zindagi	Jindhadi Patanga Naino	
2021	AT Azaad	Raunakein - Sonngs of Soil	
2021	Hello Charlie	Gypsy Guitar	
2021	Hum Do Hamare Do	Bansuri Kamli Mauj E Karam Raula Pae Gayaa Dum Gutkoon Vedha Sajjeyaa	
2021	AT Azaad	Samjhe Na Jaadu Solna Women Desi	
2022	Almost Pyaar with DJ Mohabbat	Duniyaa Banjaare Women Desi Ghangor Connection Netlfix & Chill Mohabbat Se Kranti Maintenance Tabah Tabah	
2022	Jersey	Maiyaa Mainu Mehram Baliye Re Jind Meriye	
2023	Gulmohar	Sapno kI Pakhi Woh Ghar Hori Mein	
2023	Coke Studio Bharat	Chaudhary	
2023	Pippa	Main Parwaan Jazbaat Mohabbatein Shukriya	
2024	Sharmajee Ki Beti	Jind Mahi	
2024	Jahankilla	Dil O Jaan Ae Yaariyan Saaje Khaabe Man Mutabik Shubh Karman	Punjabi Movie
2024	Shahkot	Badi Tanhai	
2024	Buckingham Palace	Halki Khanak	
2025	The Lohri Song	Sundar Mundariye	
2025	Vadakkan	Rang Likha	Malayalam Movie
2025	Ghich Pich	Munda Patteya Gaya Yaariyan Pyaar Ch Tere	

== As Main Composer ==
Year	Film	Songs	Notes
2009	Dev.D	Maahi Menu Pardesi Dhol Yaara Dhol Hiknaal Ranjhana	
2011	Bheja Fry 2	Banjaare	
2016	Udta Punjab	Da Da Dasse Chita Ve Hass Nach Le Vadiya	
2016	Fan	Ghaint Fan - Punjabi Version	
2017	Phillauri	Dum Dum Punjabi Version	
2018	Veere Di Wedding	Pappi Le Loon	
2018	3 Storeys	Azaadiyaan	
2019	Little Baby	Take It Easy	
2020	AT Azaad	Radhe (Songs of Faith) Pavansutt (Songs of Faith) Jump (Songs of Dance) Dilli Di Kudhiyaan (Songs of Dance)	
2020	Jai Mummy Di	Jai Mummy Di (Title Track)	
2020	Waah Zindagi	Jindhadi Patanga Naino	
2021	AT Azaad	Raunakein - Sonngs of Soil	
2021	Hello Charlie	Gypsy Guitar	
2021	Hum Do Hamare Do	Bansuri Kamli Mauj E Karam Raula Pae Gayaa Dum Gutkoon Vedha Sajjeyaa	
2021	AT Azaad	Samjhe Na Jaadu Solna Women Desi	
2022	Almost Pyaar with DJ Mohabbat	Duniyaa Banjaare Women Desi Ghangor Connection Netlfix & Chill Mohabbat Se Kranti Maintenance Tabah Tabah	
2022	Jersey	Maiyya Mainu Mehram Baliye Re Jind Meriye	
2023	Gulmohar	Sapno Ki Pakhi Woh Ghar Hori Mein	
2023	Coke Studio Bharat	Chaudhary	
2023	Pippa	Main Parwaan Jazbaat Mohabbatein Shukriya	
2023	Yaatris	Baje Hawa Mein Guitar	
2024	Sharmajee Ki Beti	Jind Mahi	
2024	Jahankilla	Dil O Jaan Ae Yaariyan Saaje Khaabe Man Mutabik Shubh Karman	Punjabi Movie
2024	Shahkot	Badi Tanhai	
2024	Buckingham Palace	Halki Khanak	
2025	The Lohri Song	Sundar Mundariye	
2025	Vadakkan	Rang Likha	Malayalam Movie
2025	Ghich Pich	Munda Patteya Gaya Yaariyan Pyaar Ch Tere	

== Singles ==
Year	Song Name
2017	Terra Rosa
2025	Soot Ke Dhaage
2025	Beeba
