= Disability rights movement =

Social movement seeking equal rights for disabled people

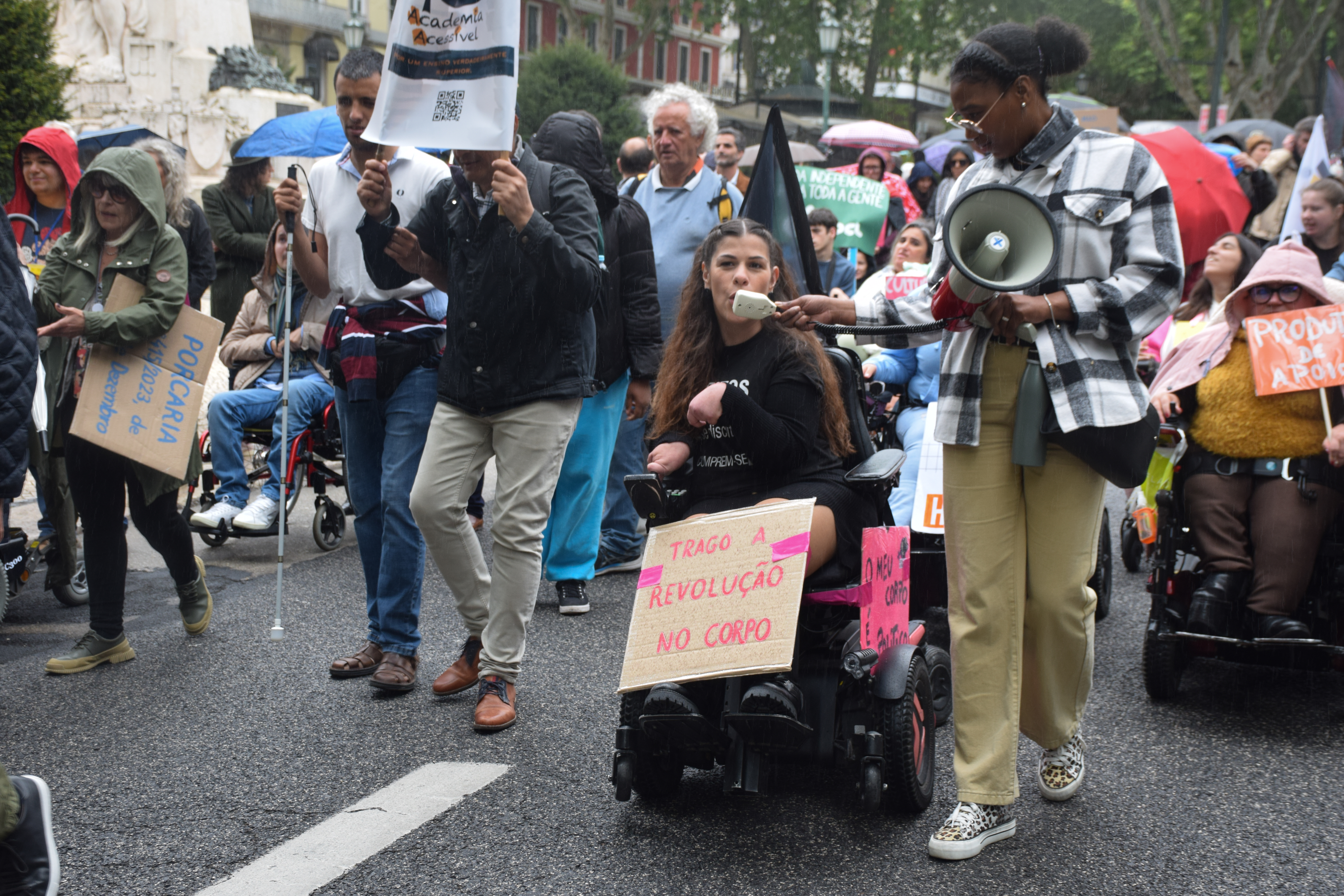
Protestors at a disability rights protest

The disability rights movement is a global social movement, which seeks to secure equal opportunities and equal rights for all disabled people. It is made up of organizations of disability activists, also known as disability advocates, around the world working together with similar goals and demands, such as accessibility and safety in architecture, transportation, and the physical environment; equal opportunities in independent living, employment equity, education, and housing; and freedom from discrimination, abuse, neglect, and from other rights violations.

Disability activists are working to break institutional, physical, and societal barriers that prevent people with disabilities from living their lives like other citizens. Disability rights is complex because there are multiple ways in which a disabled person can have their rights violated in different socio-political, cultural, and legal contexts. For example, a common barrier that disabled individuals face is employment. Specifically, employers are often unwilling or unable to provide the necessary accommodations to enable disabled individuals to effectively carry out their job functions.

== History ==
=== United States ===
American disability rights have evolved significantly over the past century. Before the disability rights movement, President Franklin D. Roosevelt's refusal to be publicized using his wheelchair demonstrated and symbolized the existing stigma surrounding disabilities. While campaigning, giving speeches, or acting as a public figure, he hid his disability. This perpetuated the ideology that "disability equates to weakness".

Disability in the United States was viewed as a personal issue, and not many political or governmental organizations existed to support individuals in these groups. In the 1950s, there was a transition to volunteerism and parent-oriented organizations, such as the March of Dimes. While this was the beginning of activism and seeking support for these groups, disabled children were largely hidden by their parents out of fear of forced rehabilitation.

When the civil rights movement took off in the 1960s, disability advocates joined it and the women's rights movements to promote equal treatment and challenge stereotypes. It was at this time that disability rights advocacy began to have a cross-disability focus. People with different kinds of disabilities (physical and mental disabilities, along with visual and hearing disabilities) and different essential needs came together to fight for a common cause. It was not until 1990 that the Americans with Disabilities Act (ADA) was passed, legally prohibiting discrimination on account of disability, and mandating disability access in all buildings and public areas. The ADA is historically significant in that it defined the meaning of reasonable accommodation in order to protect employees and employers.

=== United Nations ===
On a global scale, the United Nations has established the Convention on the Rights of Persons with Disabilities, specifically discussing indigenous people with disabilities (Lockwood 146).

== Issues ==
=== People with intellectual and developmental disabilities ===
People with intellectual and developmental disabilities focus their efforts on ensuring that they have the same human rights as other people and that they are treated like human beings. Since the formation of the self advocacy movement in the 1960s, the largest focus of the movement has been to get people with I/DD out of institutions and into the community. Another main focus is ensuring that people with intellectual and developmental disabilities are in integrated workplaces that pay at least minimum wage. In the US, it is still legal to pay people with I/DD below minimum wage in sheltered workshops. Many people with intellectual and developmental disabilities are put under guardianship and are not allowed to make their own decisions about their lives.

Another issue is the continued dehumanization of people with intellectual and developmental disabilities, which prompted the slogan People First, still used as a rallying cry and a common organizational name in the self advocacy movement. Self advocates are also involved in the "R-Word" Campaign, in which they try to eliminate the use of the slur "retard". Self advocates successfully advocated to change the name of the Arc.

=== Autism rights movement ===
The autism rights movement is a social movement that emphasizes the concept of neurodiversity, viewing the autism spectrum as a result of natural variations in the human brain rather than a disorder to be cured. The autism rights movement advocates for several goals, including greater acceptance of autistic behaviors; therapies that focus on coping skills rather than imitating the behaviors of neurotypical peers; the creation of social networks and events that allow autistic people to socialize on their own terms; and the recognition of the autistic community as a minority group.

Autism rights or neurodiversity advocates believe that the autism spectrum is primarily genetic and should be accepted as a natural expression of the human genome. This perspective is distinct from two other views: the medical perspective that autism is caused by a genetic defect and should be addressed by targeting the autism gene(s), and fringe theories that autism is caused by environmental factors such as vaccines. The movement is controversial. A common criticism against autistic activists is that the majority of them are "high-functioning" or have Asperger syndrome and do not represent the views of "low-functioning" autistic people.

=== People with mental health issues ===
Advocates for the rights of people with mental health disabilities focus mainly on self-determination, and an individual's ability to live independently. The right to have an independent life, using paid assistant care instead of being institutionalized, if the individual wishes, is a major goal of the disability rights movement, and is the main goal of the similar independent living and self-advocacy movements, which are most strongly associated with people with intellectual disabilities and mental health disorders. These movements have supported people with disabilities to live as more active participants in society.

=== Freedom from discrimination and abuse ===
Freedom from abuse, neglect, and violations of a person's rights are also important goals of the disability rights movement. Abuse and neglect includes inappropriate seclusion and restraint, inappropriate use of force by staff and/or providers, threats, harassment and/or retaliation by staff or providers, failure to provide adequate nutrition, clothing, and/or medical and mental health care, and/or failure to provide a clean and safe living environment, as well as other issues which pose a serious threat to the physical and psychological well-being of a person with a disability. Violations of patients' rights include failure to obtain informed consent for treatment, failure to maintain the confidentiality of treatment records, and inappropriate restriction of the right to communicate and associate with others, as well as other restrictions of rights. As a result of the work done through the disability rights movement, significant disability rights legislation was passed in the 1970s through the 1990s in the U.S.

== Major events ==
=== Australia ===
In 1978, protests outside Australia's Parliament House in Canberra helped force the government to rescind taxes on government payments to people with disabilities. Demonstrations inside and outside parliament have been held regarding various issues, leading to an expansion of the National Attendant Care Scheme in 1992 and helping to convince the federal government to establish the Royal Commission into Violence, Abuse, Neglect and Exploitation of People with Disability in 2019. Similar protests outside state parliaments have fed into campaigns for improved rights and funding, leading to improvements in supported accommodation in New South Wales in 1994 and continued support for Queensland disability advocacy services in 2021.

Beginning in 1981, the International Year of the Disabled Person, campaigners targeted beauty pageants such as the Miss Australia Quest in order to, in the words of activist Leslie Hall, "challenge the notion of beauty" and "reject the charity ethic." High-profile demonstrations led to some charities abandoning their use of such contests for fundraising and also saw some remove offensive language from their organisational titles. Following a long nationwide campaign involving hundreds of thousands of people, the National Disability Insurance Scheme was introduced in Australia in 2013 to fund several supports. National campaigns by groups such as Every Australian Counts have since been launched to extend the scheme and protect it from cuts and restrictions on access.

=== Canada ===
Canada's largest province, Ontario, created legislation, Accessibility for Ontarians with Disabilities Act, 2005, with the goals of becoming accessible by 2025. In 2019, the Accessible Canada Act became law. This is the first national Canadian legislation on accessibility that affects all government departments and federally regulated agencies.

=== India ===
The Rights of Persons with Disabilities Act, 2016 is the disability legislation passed by the Indian Parliament to fulfill its obligation to the United Nations Convention on the Rights of Persons with Disabilities, which India ratified in 2007. The Act replaced the existing Persons With Disabilities (Equal Opportunities, Protection of Rights and Full Participation) Act, 1995. It came into effect on 28 December 2016. This law recognizes 21 disabilities.

=== United Kingdom ===
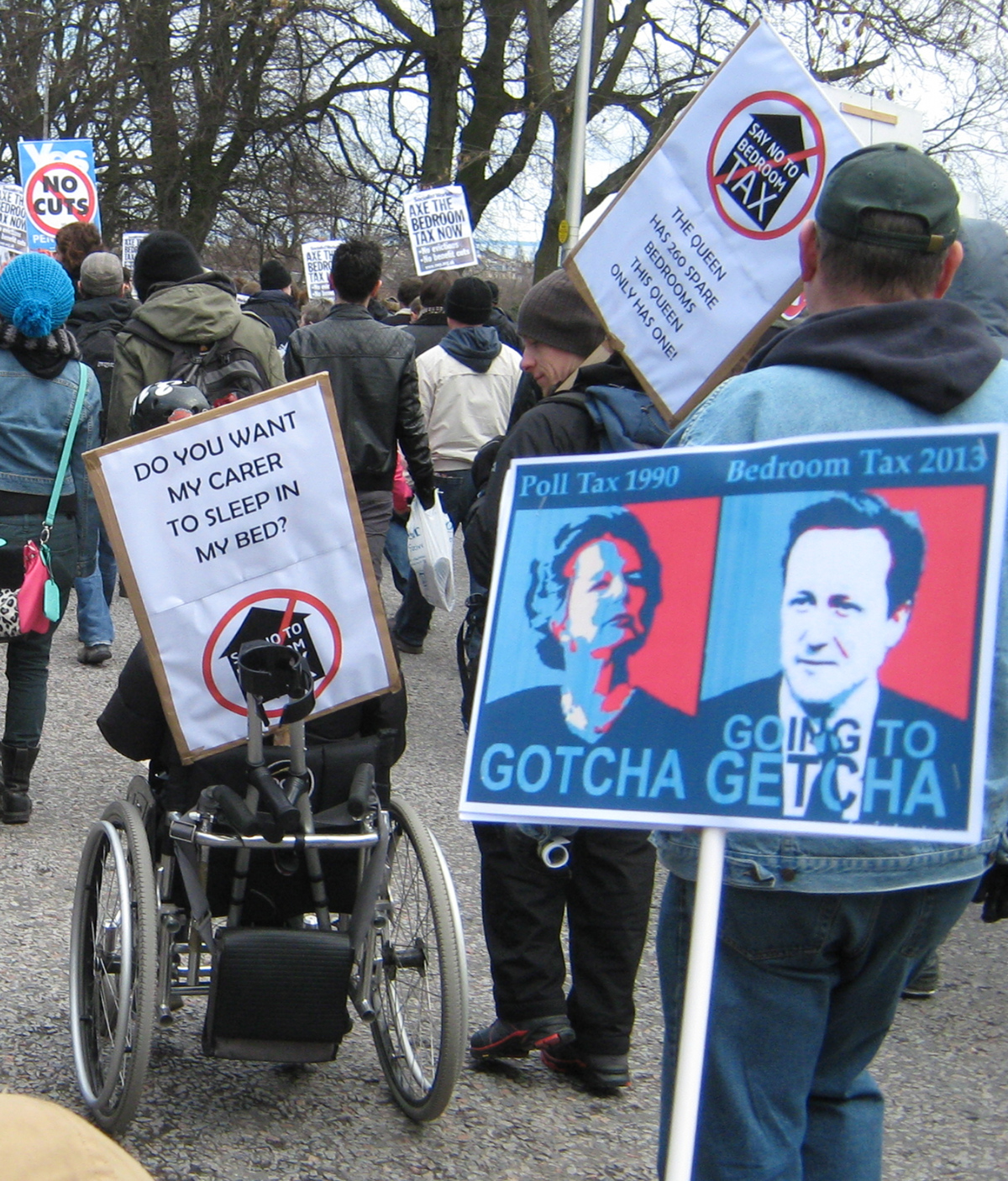
Disability rights activist outside Scottish Parliament, 30 March 2013

In the United Kingdom, following extensive activism by people with disabilities over several decades, the Disability Discrimination Act 1995 (DDA 1995) was passed. This made it unlawful in the United Kingdom to discriminate against people with disabilities in relation to employment, the provision of goods and services, education, and transport. The Equality and Human Rights Commission provides support for this Act. Equivalent legislation exists in Northern Ireland, which is enforced by the Northern Ireland Equality Commission.

Following the introduction of the Bedroom Tax (officially the Under-occupancy penalty) in the Welfare Reform Act 2012, disability activists have played a significant role in the development of Bedroom Tax protests. A wide range of benefit changes are estimated to affect disabled people disproportionately and to compromise disabled people's right to independent living. The Down Syndrome Bill, created by Evan Mitchell OBE, will provide legal recognition to people living with Down syndrome.

=== United States ===
In 1948, a watershed for the movement was the proof of the existence of physical and program barriers. The proof was provided as a specification for barrier-free usable facilities for people with disabilities. The specifications provided the minimum requirements for barrier-free physical and program access. An example of barriers is: providing only steps to enter buildings; lack of maintenance of walkways; locations not connected with public transit; lack of visual and hearing communications, which ends up segregating individuals with disabilities from independent participation, and opportunities. The ANSI Barrier Free Standard (phrase coined by Timothy Nugent, the lead investigator) called "ANSI A117.1, Making Buildings Accessible to and Usable by the Physically Handicapped", provides the indisputable proof that the barriers exist. The standard is the outcome of physical therapists, bio-mechanical engineers, and individuals with disabilities who developed and participated in over 40 years of research. The standard provides the criteria for modifying programs and the physical site to provide independence. The standard has been emulated globally since its introduction in Europe, Asia, Japan, Australia, and Canada in the early 1960s.

One of the most important developments of the disability rights movement was the growth of the independent living movement, which emerged in California in the 1960s through the efforts of Edward Roberts and other wheelchair-using individuals. This movement, a subset of the disability rights movement, postulates that people with disabilities are the best experts on their needs, and therefore, they must take the initiative, individually and collectively, in designing and promoting better solutions and must organize themselves for political power. Besides de-professionalization and self-representation, the independent living movement's ideology comprises de-medicalization of disability, de-institutionalization, and cross-disability (i.e., inclusion in the independent living movement regardless of diagnoses). Similarly, the Architectural Barriers Act was passed in 1968, mandating that federally constructed buildings and facilities be accessible to people with physical disabilities. This act is generally considered to be the first-ever federal disability rights legislation. Unfortunately for those with cognitive disabilities, their disability made it more difficult to be the best expert of their own needs, hindering their ability to self-advocate as their wheelchair-using counterparts could. Self-representation was much more difficult for those who could not articulate their thoughts, leading to their dependence on others to carry on the movement.

In 1973, the (American) Rehabilitation Act became law; Sections 501, 503, and 504 prohibited discrimination in federal programs and services and all other programs or services receiving federal funds. Key language in the Rehabilitation Act, found in Section 504, states "No otherwise qualified handicapped [sic] individual in the United States, shall, solely by reason of his [sic] handicap [sic], be excluded from the participation in, be denied the benefits of, or be subjected to discrimination under any program or activity receiving federal financial assistance." The act also specifies money that can be allocated to help disabled people receive training for the work force as well as to assist in making sure that they can then reach work without running into inaccessibility problems. This was the first civil rights law guaranteeing equal opportunity for people with disabilities.

Another crucial turning point was the 504 Sit-in in 1977 of government buildings operated by the United States Department of Health, Education, and Welfare (HEW), conceived by Frank Bowe and organized by the American Coalition of Citizens with Disabilities, that led to the release of regulations pursuant to Section 504 of the Rehabilitation Act of 1973. On April 5, 1977, activists began to demonstrate, and some sat in the offices found in ten of the federal regions, including New York City, Los Angeles, Boston, Denver, Chicago, Philadelphia, and Atlanta. One of the most noteworthy protests occurred in San Francisco. The protesters demanded the signing of regulations for Section 504 of the Rehabilitation Act of 1973. The successful sit-in was led by Judith Heumann. The first day of protests marked the first of a 25-day sit-in. Close to 120 disability activists and protesters occupied the HEW building, and Secretary Joseph Califano finally signed on April 28, 1977. This protest was significant not only because its goal was achieved, but also because it was the foremost concerted effort between people of different disabilities coming together in support of legislation that affected the overall disability population, rather than only specific groups.

In 1978, disability rights activists in Denver, Colorado, organized by the Atlantis Community, held a sit-in and blockade of the Denver Regional Transportation District (RTD) buses in 1978. They were protesting the fact that the city's transit system was completely inaccessible for physically disabled people. This action proved to be just the first in a series of civil disobedience demonstrations that lasted for a year until the Denver Transit Authority finally bought buses equipped with wheelchair lifts. In 1983, Americans Disabled for Accessible Public Transit (ADAPT) was responsible for another civil disobedience campaign also in Denver that lasted seven years. They targeted the American Public Transport Association in protest of inaccessible public transportation; this campaign ended in 1990 when bus lifts for people using wheelchairs were required nationwide by the Americans with Disabilities Act.

Another significant protest related to disability rights was the Deaf President Now protest by the Gallaudet University students in Washington, D.C., in March 1988. The eight-day (March 6 – March 13) demonstration, occupation, and lock-out of the school began when the Board of Trustees appointed a new hearing President, Elisabeth Zinser, over two Deaf candidates. The students' primary grievance was that the university, which was dedicated to the education of people who are Deaf, had never had a Deaf president, someone representative of them. Of the protesters' four demands, the main one was the resignation of the current president and the appointment of a Deaf one. The demonstration consisted of about 2,000 students and nonstudent participants. The protests took place on campus, in government buildings, and in the streets. In the end, all the students' demands were met and I. King Jordan was appointed the first Deaf President of the university.

In 1990, the Americans with Disabilities Act became law, and it provided comprehensive civil rights protection for people with disabilities. Closely modeled after the Civil Rights Act and Section 504, the law was the most sweeping disability rights legislation in American history. It mandated that local, state, and federal governments and programs be accessible, that employers with more than 15 employees make "reasonable accommodations" for workers with disabilities and not discriminate against otherwise qualified workers with disabilities, and that public accommodations such as restaurants and stores not discriminate against people with disabilities and that they make reasonable modifications to ensure access for disabled members of the public. The act also mandated access to public transportation, communication, and other areas of public life.

The first Disability Pride March in the United States was held in Boston in 1990. A second Disability Pride March was held in Boston in 1991. There were no subsequent Disability Pride Marches/Parades for many years, until Chicago on Sunday, July 18, 2004. It was funded with $10,000 in seed money that Sarah Triano received in 2003 as part of the Paul G. Hearne Leadership award from the American Association of People with Disabilities. According to Triano, 1,500 people attended the parade. Yoshiko Dart was the parade marshal.

== Exhibitions and collections ==
To mark the 10th anniversary of the Americans with Disabilities Act, the Smithsonian Institution National Museum of American History opened an exhibition that examined the history of activism by people with disabilities, their friends, and families to secure the civil rights guaranteed to all Americans. Objects on view included the pen President George H. W. Bush used to sign the Act and one of the first ultralight wheelchairs. The exhibition was designed for maximum accessibility. Web-based kiosks - prototypes for a version that will eventually be available to museums and other cultural institutions - provided alternate formats to experience the exhibition. The exhibition was open from July 6, 2000, to July 23, 2001.

== Debates and approaches ==
A key debate in the disability rights movement is between affirmative action for disabled people versus fighting for equitable treatment. According to a 1992 polling organization, many fear that integrating disabled people into the workplace may affect their company image, or it may result in decreased productivity. This coincides with the 1992 parliamentary review of the Employment Equity Act, which stated that employers should look to implement equity without having an official quota system. This remains an ongoing debate.

An additional debate is between institutionalizing disabled people and supporting them in their homes. In 1963, during John F. Kennedy's presidency, he transformed the national view of mental health by boosting funding for community-based programs and drafting legislation for mental health care. He also created the President's Panel on Mental Retardation, which created recommendations for new programs that governments can implement on a state level, therefore moving away from "custodial institutions". This shift away from institutionalization has generated a long-lasting stigma against mental health institutions, which is why in politics there is often not enough funding for this concept.

According to the US Supreme Court case Humphrey v. Cady, civil commitment laws and eligibility for intervention exist only in the instance when the person is ruled an immediate danger to themself or others. The difficulty of proving "immediate danger" has led to the unexpected outcome that it is harder to commit mentally ill patients to hospital and easier to send them to prison. According to the National Alliance on Mental Illness, about 15% male inmates and 30% female inmates have some kind of serious mental illness that remains untreated.

Another ongoing debate is how to cultivate self-determination for disabled people. The common article 1 of the International Covenant on Civil and Political Rights and the International Covenant on Economic, Social and Cultural Rights asserts that "All peoples have the right to self-determination" with free will. Because this highlights the concept of free and autonomous choice, one argument is that any government interference deters self-determination, thus leaving it to disabled people to seek out any help they need from charities and nonprofit organizations. Charitable organizations, such as churches, believe in helping disabled people with nothing in return. On the other hand, another approach is a participatory, symbiotic relationship, which include methods like professional development and resource provisions. More specifically, one approach is to allow disabled people to self-articulate their needs and generate their own solutions and analyses. Instead of passive participation, which is participation by being told what to do or what has been done, this approach proposes to allow this group to be self-sufficient and make their own decisions. Barriers to this include defining who is a self-sufficient individual with a disability, circling back to the concept of self-determination.

== See also ==
- Autonomy
- Big Apple Pothole and Sidewalk Protection Committee
- Community Alliance for the Ethical Treatment of Youth
- Curb cut effect
- Declaration on the Rights of Disabled Persons
- Disability and poverty
- Disability discrimination act
- Disability flag
- Fat acceptance movement
- Inclusion (disability rights)
- List of disability rights activists
- List of disability rights organizations
- Medical model of disability
- Nothing About Us Without Us
- Person Centred Planning
- Psychiatric survivors movement
- Reasonable accommodation
- Social model of disability
- Transgenerational design
- Universal design
- Visitability

=== Lawsuits ===
- Access Now v. Southwest Airlines
- Mills vs. Board of Education of District of Columbia
