= Maa Exchange =

Indian reality TV show

Maa Exchange is a Hindi language Indian reality television series which premiered on 12 January 2011 on Sony TV. The series is produced by Ronnie Screwvala of UTV Software Communications. The show is hosted by television actress Surekha Sikri.

"Maa Exchange" is an Indian version of the show "Wife Swap", where wives are exchanged. But to suit the Indian sensibilities, the concept has been changed to swap mothers instead.
