= Srikanth Bolla =

Indian Blind industrialist (born 1991)

- Born: 7 July 1991 (age 35); Seetharamapuram, Andhra Pradesh, India
- Education: Massachusetts Institute of Technology
- Occupation: Industrialist
- Known for: Founder of Bollant Industries Pvt. Ltd.
- Spouse: Veera Swati Duggirala (m. 2022)

Srikanth Bolla (born 7 July 1991) is an Indian industrialist and the founder of Bollant Industries. He was the first visually impaired student in Management Science at the Sloan School of Management of Massachusetts Institute of Technology.

== Personal life ==
Srikanth Bolla was born on 7 July 1991 to a Telugu family in Seetharamapuram, Machilipatnam in Andhra Pradesh. His parents were uneducated. Born as the first child, he was visually impaired from birth. Bolla's family was mainly dependent on farming. His childhood was full of struggle; there was no electricity, education was a luxury, and his family's income was less than what was needed to survive. Since he was visually impaired, educational opportunities were also a struggle, as not many accommodated it.

In school, around 11th grade, Bolla wanted to study science but due to his visual impairment, he was not able to do so. Even though he topped his class with a 98% on his X board exams, the school didn't have accommodations for visually impaired pupils. Bolla filed a court case, and after a six-month wait, his perseverance paid off when he won, becoming the first visually impaired student in Andhra Pradesh to study science.

After graduation, Bolla was denied admission to coaching institutes for the Indian Institute of Technology. He decided to pursue engineering because of his blindness.

Since then, he has been an important figure in creating opportunities for visually impaired people. He has been a youth leader since 2005 and went on to become a member of Lead India 2020: The Second National Youth Movement. Started by former President of India A. P. J. Abdul Kalam, Lead India 2020 is helping India reach the goal of becoming a developed nation by 2020 by eradicating poverty, illiteracy and unemployment.

In 2012, Bolla set up Bollant Industries with his business partner, Ravi Mantha.

He got married in 2022 to Veera Swathi, after a courtship of almost 10 years. In 2024, the couple had a daughter, whom they named as Nayana, meaning eyes.

== Career ==
Bolla co-founded Samanvai Center for Children with Multiple Disabilities in 2011 in which he started a Braille printing press, providing educational, vocational, financial, and rehabilitation services to students with multiple disabilities for an economically independent and self-sustainable life.

In 2012, Bolla started Bollant Industries with co-founder Ravi Mantha. Bollant Industries manufactures areca-based products and provides employment to several hundred people with disabilities, with funding from Ratan Tata. Addressing a combination of issues – employment, economics and environment – Bollant produces eco-friendly recycled Kraft paper from municipal waste or soiled paper, packaging products from recycled paper, disposable products from natural leaf and recycled paper and recycles waste plastic into usable products. Bollant has shown exceptional growth, averaging 20% a month since inception and a turnover of ₹150 crores in 2018.

Srikanth is the director of Surge Impact Foundation, founded in September 2016. The organisation aims to enable individuals and institutions in India to achieve the Sustainable Development Goals by 2030.

In April 2017, Bolla was named by Forbes magazine in its list of 30 under 30 across all of Asia, one of only three Indians on that list.

== In popular culture ==
In 2024, a biopic film Srikanth, featuring actor Rajkummar Rao in the lead role of Srikanth Bolla was announced. The trailer was released on 9 April 2024. During trailer launch, Srikanth who was also present remembered how the T-Series cassettes helped him complete his education from class 5 to class 10. The film was released on May 10, 2024, on the occasion of Akshaya Tritiya.

== Legal disputes ==
Srikanth owns two flats in the Babukhan Millennium Centre apartment complex in Somajiguda, stopped paying maintenance charges to the association amid disputes over parking space and other issues.In response, apartment association has cut essential services as per Section 21 of the Telangana Apartments (Promotion of Construction and Ownership) Act, 1987. Srikanth moved High Court and High Court ruled in favor of apartment association.
