= Government Dental College, Bengaluru =

Dental College in Bangalore, Karnataka, India

Coordinates: 12°57′50.3″N 77°34′34.0″E

University rankings

Dental – India
- NIRF (2024): 19

The Government Dental College, was the first dental college in Karnataka, India. It is an autonomous institute of government of India. The college is located in K.R. Market. This college was established in 1958. The National Institutional Ranking Framework (NIRF) ranked the institute 19th in its dental ranking 2024.
