= Persons With Disabilities (Equal Opportunities, Protection of Rights and Full Participation) Act, 1995 =

Act of the Parliament of India

The Persons With Disabilities (Equal Opportunities, Protection of Rights and Full Participation) Act, 1995 was an Act to give effect to the “Proclamation on the Full Participation and Equality of the People with Disabilities in the Asian and Pacific Region.”

India is a signatory to the said Proclamation and it is considered necessary to implement the Proclamation aforesaid.

== The Act ==
The Act listed seven disabilities. It also reserved 3% of government employment as well as educational institutions.

== See also ==
- Accessible India Campaign
- Disability Discrimination Act 1995
