= Rights of Persons with Disabilities Act, 2016 =

Act by the Indian Parliament to comply with a United Nations Convention

Parliament of India
- Long title: An Act to give effect to the United Nations Convention on the Rights of Persons with Disabilities and for matters connected therewith or incidental thereto.
- Citation: Act No. 49 of 2016
- Territorial extent: India
- Passed by: Rajya Sabha
- Passed: 14 December 2016
- Passed by: Lok Sabha
- Passed: 16 December 2016
- Assented to: 27 December 2016
- Commenced: 15 June 2017

Legislative history

Initiating chamber: Rajya Sabha
- Bill title: The Rights of Persons with Disabilities Bill, 2014
- Bill citation: Bill No. I of 2014
- Introduced by: Mallikarjun Kharge
- Introduced: 7 February 2014
- Committee report: Standing Committee Report

Final stages
- Reported from conference committee: 7 May 2015

Repeals
- The Persons with Disabilities (Equal Opportunities, Protection of Rights and Full Participation) Act, 1995
- Status: In force

The Rights of Persons with Disabilities Act, 2016 is a disability law passed by the Parliament of India to fulfill its obligations under the United Nations Convention on the Rights of Persons with Disabilities, ratified by India in 2007. The Act replaced the Persons with Disabilities (Equal Opportunities, Protection of Rights and Full Participation) Act, 1995.

== Legislative history ==
The Rights of Persons with Disabilities Bill, 2014 was introduced into the Parliament on 7 February 2014 and passed by the Lok Sabha on 14 December 2016. The Bill was passed by the Rajya Sabha on 16 December 2016 and received the President's assent on 27 December 2016. The Act became operational on 15 June 2017. The Central Government rules 2017 have been notified under Section 100 of the Act and have come into force with effect from 15 June 2017.

== Case law ==
Uttar Pradesh cabinet minister was the first one to be booked under this new legislation when disability activist Satendra Singh (doctor) filed case against him on publicly humiliating a disabled employee. The addition of thalassemia as a new disability under this new law allowed a Chhattisgarh girl with this disorder to get medical admission after the Supreme Court's intervention.

=== Accessibility in Transport ===
Significant legal challenges have shaped the accessibility of air travel in India. In 2006, activists Subrata Pramanick and Rajiv Ranjan filed a landmark complaint (Case No. 3197/2006) against Deccan Aviation (Air Deccan) before the Court of the Chief Commissioner for Persons with Disabilities. The case challenged the airline's practice of charging a "wheelchair tax" of ₹500 for mobility assistance. This litigation, cited in the company's 2006 SEBI prospectus, contributed to the eventual mandate that all Indian carriers provide wheelchair assistance to passengers with disabilities free of charge under Civil Aviation Requirements (CAR).

== Sources ==
- "India Digital Accessibility Laws: An Overview". Bureau of Internet Accessibility. BOIA.
- Initiative (WAI), W3C Web Accessibility (9 November 2023). "India". Web Accessibility Initiative (WAI).
- "GIGW 3.0: Version 3 of Guidelines for Indian Government Websites seeks to enhance usability of mobile apps - ET Government". ETGovernment.com. The Economic Times. 12 March 2023.
- Rogers, Mark (5 February 2021). "Government accessibility standards and WCAG 2". Powermapper.
- "Global Law and Policy". Law Office of Lainey Feingold.
- "International Web Accessibility Laws and Policies". whoisaccessible.com. 27 February 2020.
- "Web Accessibility Standards Across the World (Sorted by Country)". commonlook.com. Commionlook.
- Pandey, Shashank (4 November 2022). "Few Indian websites are technically accessible to disabled people – despite the law requiring this". Scroll.in. Scroll.in.
- "Employees don't think about security, they come and go: Government's strict diktat on ensuring website security". Moneycontrol. 28 March 2023.
- "Law Minister Kiren Rijiju launches new 'divyang-friendly' website of Department of Justice". ThePrint. 31 March 2022.
- "Why Does Mainstream Indian Discourse On Digital Inclusion Leave Out Disability?". The Wire. 9 May 2017.
