= Yaariyan 2 (soundtrack) =

2023 film soundtrack album

Soundtrack album by Manan Bhardwaj, Yo Yo Honey Singh, Rahim Shah, Khaalif, R. D. Burman, Dhrubajyoti Phukan, Abhijit Vaghani, Ram Sampath, Jasleen Royal, Radhika Rao and Vinay Sapru
- Released: 24 September 2023 (first); 12 November 2023 (second)
- Recorded: 2022–2023
- Genre: Feature film soundtrack
- Length: 35:49 (first); 35:59 (second)
- Language: Hindi
- Label: T-Series
- Producer: Bhushan Kumar
External audio
- Yaariyan 2 – First Soundtrack on YouTube
- Yaariyan 2 – Second Soundtrack on YouTube

Singles from Yaariyan 2
- 1. "Saure Ghar" Released: 28 August 2023; 2. "Simroon Tera Naam" Released: 8 September 2023; 3. "Oonchi Oonchi Deewarein" Released: 16 September 2023

Yaariyan 2 is the soundtrack album to the 2023 film of the same name directed by Radhika Rao and Vinay Sapru. A spiritual successor to Yaariyan (2014) and a remake of the Malayalam film Bangalore Days, the film stars Divya Khosla Kumar, Yash Dasgupta, Pearl V Puri, Anaswara Rajan, Priya Prakash Varrier, Bhagyashri Borse, Meezaan Jafri and Warina Hussain.

Two soundtracks were released for the film: the first being consisted of the songs featured in the film, released on 24 September 2023. It features 10 songs with music and lyrics by Manan Bhardwaj, Yo Yo Honey Singh, Rahim Shah, Khaalif. The second album featured a compilation of old songs specifically heard in the film and released on 12 November 2023. Both albums were distributed by T-Series.

== Development ==
The film's primary contributor of music was Manan Bhardwaj, who earlier worked on curating independent singles and being part of multi-composer soundtracks for T-Series. When he completed working on "Dhokha" composed by Arijit Singh for the label, one of the executives from the label, asked to compose a song that depicted the brother-sister relationship. While Bhardwaj mistakenly identified it as it was for some independent single, he worked on the mukhda of the song (later deciphered as "Saure Ghar") and sent to Bhushan Kumar. The latter immediately liked it and insisted to work in few other songs for the film as well. This resulted in him curating seven songs for the film and its album, being the predominant contributor. Since he had worked on one or few songs in multi-composer albums, the curation was a long process, but he enjoyed it thoroughly.

According to Bhardwaj, each song "emotes differently and explains the story itself", describing the characters and their relationships. Bhardwaj curated so many tunes and well as experimented in the lyrical writing so that he would be connected to his melodies. Bhardwaj called it as "a beautifully diversified and wonderful music album." The song "Sunny Sunny" which was composed for its predecessor, by Yo Yo Honey Singh had been remade for the film as "Sunny Sunny 2.0" and "Blue Hai Paani Paani", respectively. Singh composed the remake versions with music producer Khaalif, while the only original song "Kho Sa Gaya Hoon" was composed with Bhardwaj.

== Release ==
The first single "Saure Ghar" was released on 28 August 2023. The second song "Simroon Tera Naam", which was a remake of the originally composed "Sanson Ki Mala Pe" by Nusrat Fateh Ali Khan, was released on 8 September 2023. The third song "Oonchi Oonchi Deewarein" was released on 16 September 2023. The soundtrack was released on 24 September. On 12 November, a month after the film's release, another soundtrack was unveiled which featured the songs heard in the film.

== Reception ==
Critic based at Radio Mirchi mentioned that the soundtrack "has a mix of melodies, raps and groovy numbers, making it a wholesome album for music enthusiasts". Deepa Gahlot of Rediff.com wrote "The music is pleasant enough while it is playing on screen but no tune stays on your mind." Bollywood Hungama wrote "The songs are decent though it's in no way close to the hit soundtrack of Yaariyan (2014)." Subhash K Jha of Times Now called the songs "ear-friendly [...] especially Arjit Singh’s Oonchi Oonchi Deewarein and Sachet Tandon’s Simroon Tera Naam which has been shot with an exquisite play of light and shade."

== Track listing ==
Yaariyan 2 (Original Motion Picture Soundtrack) – first soundtrack
No.	Title	Lyrics	Music	Singer(s)	Length
1.	"Saure Ghar"	Manan Bhardwaj	Manan Bhardwaj	Vishal Mishra, Neeti Mohan, Manan Bhardwaj	3:38
2.	"Simroon Tera Naam"	Manan Bhardwaj	Manan Bhardwaj	Sachet Tandon	4:18
3.	"Oonchi Oonchi Deewarein"	Manan Bhardwaj	Manan Bhardwaj	Arijit Singh	4:11
4.	"Blue Hai Paani Paani"	Yo Yo Honey Singh, Khaalif	Yo Yo Honey Singh, Khaalif	Arijit Singh, Neha Kakkar	3:33
5.	"Bewafaa Tu"	Manan Bhardwaj, Rahim Shah, Shamsul Hasan Shams	Manan Bhardwaj	Jubin Nautiyal	6:29
6.	"Suit Patiala"	Manan Bhardwaj	Manan Bhardwaj	Guru Randhawa, Neha Kakkar, Manan Bhardwaj	3:07
7.	"Heer Bhi Roye"	Manan Bhardwaj	Manan Bhardwaj	Parampara Tandon	4:00
8.	"Peene De"	Manan Bhardwaj	Manan Bhardwaj	Master Saleem, Millind Gaba	3:47
9.	"Sunny Sunny 2.0"	Yo Yo Honey Singh, Khaalif	Yo Yo Honey Singh, Khaalif	Yo Yo Honey Singh, Neha Kakkar	3:34
10.	"Kho Sa Gaya Hoon"	Manan Bhardwaj, Yo Yo Honey Singh	Manan Bhardwaj, Yo Yo Honey Singh	Manan Bhardwaj, Yo Yo Honey Singh, Neha Kakkar	0:53
11.	"Heer Bhi Roye (Film Version)"	Manan Bhardwaj	Manan Bhardwaj	Neha Kakkar	3:45
Total length:					35:49

Yaariyan 2 (Original Motion Picture Soundtrack) – second soundtrack
No.	Title	Lyrics	Music	Singer(s)	Length
1.	"Aaja Meri Jaan"	Mayur Puri	R. D. Burman, Dhrubajyoti Phukan	Mauli Dave	5:14
2.	"Fools Game"	Radhika Rao and Vinay Sapru	Radhika Rao and Vinay Sapru	Aaroh Velankar	2:04
3.	"Teri Lod Nahi/ Rabba"	Kumaar, Dev Kohli	Abhijit Vaghani	Asees Kaur, Inder Chahal	5:17
4.	"Chahtaan/Dard"	Nirmaan	Abhijit Vaghani	Palak Muchhal, Jordan Sandhu	5:36
5.	"O Ri Chiraiya"	Swanand Kirkire	Ram Sampath	Mriganka Bhattacharya	4:43
6.	"Roi Na/Maahi Ve"	Nirmaan	Abhijit Vaghani	Kanika Kapoor, Ninja	4:49
7.	"Set Me Free"	Radhika Rao and Vinay Sapru	Radhika Rao and Vinay Sapru	Mriganka Bhattacharya	2:33
8.	"Din Shagna Da"	Neeraj Rajawat	Jasleen Royal	Jasleen Royal	3:36
9.	"Chan Kitthan/Mere Sohneya"	Kumaar, Irshad Kamil	Abhijit Vaghani	Akhil Sachdeva, Kaur B	4:21
Total length:					35:59
