= Yaariyan (soundtrack) =

Soundtrack album by Pritam, Mithoon, Yo Yo Honey Singh, Arko and Anupam Amod
- Released: 3 December 2013
- Recorded: 2013
- Genre: Feature film soundtrack
- Length: 1:02:33
- Language: Hindi
- Label: T-Series
- Producer: Bhushan Kumar

Pritam chronology
Dhoom 3 (2013)	Yaariyan (2013)	Shaadi Ke Side Effects (2014)

Mithoon chronology
Aashiqui 2 (2013)	Yaariyan (2014)	Samrat & Co. (2014)

Yo Yo Honey Singh chronology
Boss (2013)	Yaariyan (2014)	Ragini MMS 2 (2014)

Arko chronology
Jism 2 (2012)	Yaariyan (2014)	Hate Story 2 (2014)

Anupam Amod chronology
Once Upon ay Time in Mumbai Dobaara! (2013)	Yaariyan (2014)	I Love New Year (2015)

Yaariyan is the soundtrack album to the 2014 film of the same name directed by Divya Khosla Kumar and produced by T-Series Films. The album featured 13 songs composed by an assortment of musicians, which include: Pritam, Mithoon, Yo Yo Honey Singh, Arko and Anupam Amod, with lyrics written by Amitabh Bhattacharya, Irshad Kamil, Mithoon, Singh and Arko. The album was released through T-Series on 3 December 2013.

== Background ==
The music for the film is curated by Pritam, Mithoon, Yo Yo Honey Singh, Arko and Anupam Amod; the latter three would write lyrics for their songs, whereas Pritam's compositions had lyrics written by Amitabh Bhattacharya and Irshad Kamil. Pritam, who usually wanted to take charge of the film's music in its entirety, accepted composing for Yaariyan due to his rapport with Bhushan Kumar, the producer and whose wife Divya making her directorial debut with this film.

Honey Singh also joined the film owing to Bhushan's rapport and contributed to "ABCD" (as rapper) and "Sunny Sunny" (as composer and rapper) after a live concert performance in Dubai. Mithoon and Arko, who was launched by the label on Aashiqui 2 (2013) and Jism 2 (2012) had composed two songs, respectively. Arko played the song "Allah Waariyan" live on guitar during a music audition, and after being offered the role, he discussed with the music team on finding the right voice, before choosing Shafqat Amanat Ali. He said, "Allah Waariyan is about relationships, friendship, beautiful memories, and it happens at a very important juncture in the film when things turn emotional and serious." Shafqat felt the song was written specifically for him, which had elements of Sufi music. The other song "Zor Lagaake Haisha" is a climatic rock number, which was described as "simple, colloquial, and encouraging for a competition" and a non-filmi number runs on bass and rhythm.

The song "Meri Maa" was composed by Anupam Amod, an assistant to Pritam. He dedicated the song to his mother, on composing the track. Five of the songs were choreographed by Divya herself.

== Release ==
Prior to the album's release, Bhushan secretly recorded, mixed and mastered the first copy of its songs, to be delivered in a custom heart shaped special CD for Divya on her birthday (20 November 2013). The film's music launch was held at the Mithibai College in Mumbai on 3 December 2013, with the cast and crew in attendance and a live performance from the musical team.

== Reception ==
Taran Adarsh of Bollywood Hungama wrote "One of the USPs of the film is – no prizes for guessing this one! — the musical score, which has the word 'Chartbuster' written all over it. In fact, every track has caught on big time with listeners, especially 'Baarish' [soulful], 'Sunny Sunny' [a rage with partygoers], 'ABCD' [foot-tapping], 'Allah Waariyan' [melodic] and 'Meri Maa' [makes you moist-eyed]." In the review for The Times of India, Bryan Durham noted on the multi-composer assortment saying, "Yaariyan could have you believing that too much of a good thing can be good". Karthik Srinivasan of Milliblog wrote "Typical North Indian thali style soundtrack; very T-series." Although giving negative review for the film, Paloma Sharma of Rediff.com wrote "As an album, Yaariyan might do well with its catchy tunes".

== Track listing ==
No.	Title	Lyrics	Music	Singer(s)	Length
1.	"ABCD"	Amitabh Bhattacharya	Pritam	Yo Yo Honey Singh, Benny Dayal, Shefali Alvares	3:25
2.	"Baarish"	Mithoon	Mithoon	Mohammed Irfan, Gajendra Verma	6:14
3.	"Sunny Sunny"	Yo Yo Honey Singh	Yo Yo Honey Singh	Yo Yo Honey Singh, Neha Kakkar	4:03
4.	"Allah Waariyan"	Arko	Arko	Arko, Shafqat Amanat Ali	5:14
5.	"Love Me Thoda Aur"	Irshad Kamil	Pritam	Arijit Singh, Monali Thakur, Nikhil D'Souza	4:25
6.	"Meri Maa"	Irshad Kamil	Anupam Amod	K.K.	5:17
7.	"Zor Lagaake Haisha"	Irshad Kamil	Arko	Vishal Dadlani	5:59
8.	"Mujhe Ishq Se"	Mithoon	Mithoon	Gajendra Verma, Tulsi Kumar	5:44
9.	"Baarish – Yaariyan" (Remix)	Mithoon	Mithoon, DJ Shiva	Mohammed Irfan, Gajendra Verma	5:07
10.	"Meri Maa" (Reprise)	Irshad Kamil	Anupam Amod	K.K.	4:43
11.	"ABCD – Yaariyan" (Remix)	Amitabh Bhattacharya	Pritam, Kiran Kamath	Yo Yo Honey Singh, Benny Dayal, Shefali Alvares	3:19
12.	"Meri Maa" (Unplugged)	Irshad Kamil	Anupam Amod	Anupam Amod	5:17
13.	"Yaariyan Mashup"	Various	Various	Various	3:43
Total length:					1:02:33

== Accolades ==
Award	Date of ceremony (Note: Date is linked to the article about the awards held that year, wherever possible.)	Category	Recipients	Result	Ref.
BIG Star Entertainment Awards	18 December 2014	Most Entertaining Music	Pritam, Mithoon, Yo Yo Honey Singh, Arko and Anupam Amod	Nominated	
BIG Star Entertainment Awards	18 December 2014	Most Entertaining Song	"Sunny Sunny"	Nominated	
BIG Star Entertainment Awards	18 December 2014	Most Entertaining Singer (Female)	Yo Yo Honey Singh – "Sunny Sunny"	Nominated	
Filmfare Awards	31 January 2015	Best Music Director	Pritam, Mithoon, Yo Yo Honey Singh, Arko and Anupam Amod	Nominated	
International Indian Film Academy Awards	5–7 June 2015	Best Music Director	Pritam, Mithoon, Yo Yo Honey Singh, Arko and Anupam Amod	Nominated	
Star Guild Awards (Note: Also known as Apsara Film & Television Producers Guild Awards.)	12 January 2015	Best Music Director	Yo Yo Honey Singh – "Sunny Sunny"	Nominated	
Stardust Awards	15 December 2014	Best Music Director	Pritam, Mithoon, Yo Yo Honey Singh, Arko and Anupam Amod	Won	
Stardust Awards	15 December 2014	Best Playback Singer – Male	Yo Yo Honey Singh – "Sunny Sunny"	Nominated	
