= Once Upon ay Time in Mumbai Dobaara! (soundtrack) =

2013 soundtrack album

Once Upon a Time in Mumbai Dobaara! (Original Motion Picture Soundtrack)
- Soundtrack cover

Soundtrack album by Pritam, Anupam Amod and Laxmikant–Pyarelal
- Released: 17 July 2013
- Recorded: 2013
- Genre: Feature film soundtrack
- Length: 23:42
- Language: Hindi
- Label: T-Series
- Producers: Shobha Kapoor; Ekta Kapoor

Pritam chronology
Yeh Jawaani Hai Deewani (2013)	Once Upon a Time in Mumbai Dobaara! (Original Motion Picture Soundtrack) (2013)	Phata Poster Nikla Hero (2013)

Anupam Amod chronology
Murder 3 (2013)	Once Upon a Time in Mumbai Dobaara! (2013)	I Love New Year (2013)

Laxmikant–Pyarelal chronology
Nautanki Saala (2013)	Once Upon a Time in Mumbai Dobaara! (2013)

Singles from Once Upon a Time in Mumbai Dobaara!
- 1. "Ye Tune Kya Kiya" Released: 13 June 2013

Once Upon a Time in Mumbai Dobaara! (Original Motion Picture Soundtrack) is the soundtrack album to the 2013 film Once Upon a Time in Mumbai Dobaara! directed by Milan Luthria. The film is a sequel to Once Upon a Time in Mumbaai (2010), starring Akshay Kumar, Imran Khan and Sonakshi Sinha. The album consisted of six tracks composed by Pritam, Anupam Amod and Laxmikant–Pyarelal, with lyrics written by Rajat Arora. The album's lead single "Ye Tune Kya Kiya" was released on 13 June 2013, while the remaining tracks were released along with the album on 17 July 2013.

== Background ==
The soundtrack of Once Upon ay Time in Mumbai Dobaara! features five songs, with three of them were composed by Pritam, and two of them by Anupam Amod. The latter also recreated the song "Tayyab Ali" which is originally composed by Laxmikant–Pyarelal and written by Anand Bakshi, from the film Amar Akbar Anthony (1977). The lyrics for all the songs were penned by Rajat Arora, including the recreated version of "Tayyab Ali". According to the singer Javed Ali, "Tayyab Ali" was recorded three to four times as Pritam wanted to have the feel of Mohammed Rafi as well as his own style.

== Marketing and release ==
The first single "Ye Tune Kya Kiya", sung by Javed Bashir and composed by Pritam, was released on 13 June 2013 as the lead single from the soundtrack album. It was made available for purchase in the digital music platform iTunes and the media store iTunes Store. The makers hosted three qawwali nights which were open to public from 28–30 June in Mumbai, Lucknow and Delhi which featured Kumar, Khan and Sinha in attendance, and featured performances of professional qawwals. The music video of the song "Tayyab Ali" was launched at the same event held at Chinchbundar, Dongri with Khan and Sinha attending. The soundtrack was launched on 17 July 2013.

== Music videos ==
The songs "Yeh Tune Kya Kiya" and "Chugliyaan" is picturized on Shoaib Khan (Kumar) and Aslam Siddiqui (Khan)'s love triangle with Jasmine Shaikh (Sinha). The music video of "Tayyab Ali" was shot in six days at Film City in Mumbai. The track "Tu Hi Khwaahish" is an item number picturized on Shoaib, Shaikh and Ayesha Dixit (Sophie Choudry) while Amanda Rosario and Hazel Crowney. The video of the song was unveiled on 17 July 2013. The music video for "Chugliyaan" was released on 24 July. The video for the song "Bismillah" was shot at Film City and a Mumbai nightclub which was modified to evoke the 1980s. It was released on 7 August 2013, two days before Eid-Ul-Fitr, to capitalise on Eid celebrations nationwide. According to reports there was gonna be a remake of Yo Yo Honey Singh song Siftaan titled "Siftaan 2.0" but during the fight and rape songs media deleted the song.

== Critical response ==
The soundtrack of the film received positive reviews. Rajiv Vijayakar of Bollywood Hungama said that "the soundtrack has only four songs but nevertheless emerges as one of the better albums of this year" rating three out of five stars. Bryan Durham of The Times of India rated three-and-a-half out of five stars and said that "Pritam's compositions here are competent but nowhere as memorable as what he accomplished with OUATIM". Joginder Tuteja of Rediff.com gave the same writing and summarized "Pritam's music in Once Upon A Time In Mumbaai Dobara are good enough to be played on loop" calling "Yeh Tune Kya Kiya" and "Tu Hi Khwahish" as "instant winners". Karthik Srinivasan of Milliblog wrote "Do gaane [two songs] work in this Dobaara [sequel]".

In contrast, Sankhayan Ghosh of The Indian Express criticized it for the recycled tunes and described it as a "surprisingly bland outing". Vipin Nair of Music Aloud gave 6/10 to the album and wrote that it works "less than half its predecessor – both in quantity and quality." Anupama Chopra, in her review for Hindustan Times, wrote "too many songs unnecessarily stretch the film to 160 minutes". Sarita A. Tanwar of Daily News and Analysis wrote "The soundtrack of this film also does not match up".

== Track listing ==
Once Upon a Time in Mumbai Dobaara! (Original Motion Picture Soundtrack) track listing
No.	Title	Lyrics	Music	Singer(s)	Length
1.	"Yeh Tune Kya Kiya"	Rajat Arora	Pritam	Javed Bashir	5:14
2.	"Tayyab Ali"	Anand Bakshi, Rajat Arora	Laxmikant–Pyarelal, Anupam Amod	Javed Ali	4:37
3.	"Tu Hi Khwahish"	Rajat Arora	Pritam	Sunidhi Chauhan	4:51
4.	"Chugliyaan"	Rajat Arora	Pritam	Javed Ali, Sahir Ali Bagga	4:59
5.	"Bismillah"	Rajat Arora	Anupam Amod	Anupam Amod	4:56
6.	"Ye Tune Kya Kiya" (Unplugged)	Rajat Arora	Pritam	Arijit Singh	4:51
Total length:					27:49
