= Sunny Sunny =

2013 single by Yo Yo Honey Singh and Neha Kakkar

Single by Yo Yo Honey Singh & Neha Kakkar

from the album Yaariyan
- Language: Hindi
- Released: December 7, 2013
- Length: 4:03
- Label: T-Series
- Songwriter: Yo Yo Honey Singh
- Producer: Bhushan Kumar

"Sunny Sunny" (Note: Also known by its opening lines (incipit) "Blue Hai Paani Paani".) is a Hindi-language single written, composed and sung by Indian rapper Yo Yo Honey Singh and singer Neha Kakkar. It was released at the end of 2013 as a special track for the 2014 film Yaariyan. The song was mixed by Vinod Verma. It became one of Singh's most popular songs and most watched videos.

Honey Singh later said that the entire song was composed, written, and recorded in two hours. He criticized its lyrics. The song received feedback from various news sources.

== Release and music video ==
The soundtrack of Yaariyan was written and composed by the four music directors Pritam Chakraborty, Yo Yo Honey Singh, Mithoon and Arko Mukherjee. Honey Singh joined the soundtrack for his friendship with producer Bhushan Kumar and his wife Divya Khosla Kumar. Being given a 24-hour notice, Singh flew from Dubai to India to record the song "ABCD" and create and sing the party track song "Sunny Sunny".

The music video of the song was released in December 2013, a month before the film's formal release. It went viral on YouTube, to which it was first posted to. Bangalorean actress Nicole Faria was featured in the music video in which she made her debut in the Bollywood film industry. Other actresses and actors present in the film were featured in Honey Singh's music video.

== Reception ==
Bryan Durham of The Times of India rated the Yaariyan soundtrack 3 out of 5 stars. About "Sunny Sunny", Durham said that the composition, sung and written by him, is the complete opposite of "Baarish", another song of the same movie. Durham further writes "Neha Kakkar also features on the track and its a mid-tempo track with a thump that’s perfect for a lazy afternoon party."

Shouvik Chakraborty of India.com in a music review of Yaariyan wrote in his article considered "Sunny Sunny" by Yo Yo Honey Singh and Neha Kakkar to be another upbeat number from the same movie. He stated it to have a simple music setting and catchy music and praised Neha Kakkar's voice in the song. He said it gave out a Venga Boys feel. He rated the movie album 3 stars out of 5.

Paloma Sharma of Rediff.com wrote in a movie review of Yaariyan that the only reason she bothered to rate the film was because there was only one track that stood out to Sharma, amidst which she considered most to be repetitive songs and Yo Yo Honey Singh's catchy lyrics (Sunny Sunnt). Sharma wrote that Yaariyan might have been able to do well with its catchy tunes as an album.

Tushar Joshi of Daily News and Analysis (DNA India) remarked that the music was already a rage with ABCD and Sunny Sunny topping the charts. He stated that Divya Khosla did a decent job of using these tracks to their maximum benefit. He wrote that the two songs made their presence felt throughout whether it was the background music or opening credits.

A revamped version of the song was featured in a teaser for the film Yaariyan 2 which lasted 2 minutes. Television network PTC Punjabi commented "The teaser, a tantalizing 2 minutes and 22 seconds, culminates with the introduction of the revamped version of the iconic song 'Sunny Sunny,' a preview that has already sent waves of excitement among fans." Manan Bhardwaj, a music composer for the film, commented that "Sunny Sunny" was a blockbuster and main attraction of the first film, which they felt would remind and identify the watchers of the first film and decided to relive "Sunny Sunny" as an incorporation into Yaariyan 2.

== Comments by singer ==
During an interview with The Lallantop in 2024, Honey Singh criticized "Sunny Sunny" and some of his other popular songs such as "Lungi Dance" and "Party All Night". Singh stated in his interview that he wrote the songs without giving much thought to their content or lyrical depth, and shared his music background. When Singh was asked whether he wrote "Sunny Sunny" in a hurry, he replied that he fully completed the song, its music, lyrics and recording within just two hours. He stated it to be the "most stupid song" he ever wrote, criticizing the lyrics "Blue Hai Paani Paani, Din Hai Sunny Sunny" as "nonsense". He also spoke about the other songs.

Further speaking about the composition, Honey Singh considered "Sunny Sunny" as not being worthy of being a song. Singh pointed to the starting lyrics "Blue Hai Paani Paani, Din Hai Sunny Sunny", calling it nonsensical and not owing to any depth. He called the three songs as lacking substance and meaning. He made statements about "Brown Rang", saying that it was written carefully and with precision and also his song "Blue Eyes". He said that although he did not mind lyrical depth, it is still a popular song.
