= Hungama 2 =

2021 Indian film by Priyadarshan

- Official release poster
- Directed by: Priyadarshan
- Screenplay by: Yunus Sajawal
- Dialogues by: Anukalp Goswami; Manisha Korde
- Story by: Priyadarshan
- Based on: Minnaram by Priyadarshan
- Produced by: Ratan Jain; Ganesh Jain; Chetan Jain; Armaan Ventures
- Starring: Paresh Rawal; Shilpa Shetty; Meezaan Jafri; Pranitha Subhash; Ashutosh Rana
- Cinematography: N. K. Ekambaram
- Edited by: M. S. Aiyyappan Nair
- Music by: Songs: Anu Malik; Score: Ronnie Raphael
- Production company: Venus Worldwide Entertainment
- Distributed by: Disney+ Hotstar
- Release date: 23 July 2021
- Running time: 156 minutes
- Country: India
- Language: Hindi

Hungama 2 is a 2021 Indian Hindi-language romantic comedy film directed by Priyadarshan and jointly produced by Ratan Jain, Ganesh Jain, Chetan Jain and Armaan Ventures. A spiritual sequel to the 2003 film Hungama and loosely based on Priyadarshan's own 1994 Malayalam film Minnaram with a comedy sequence borrowed from his other Malayalam film Vandanam (1989) both starring Mohanlal, it stars Paresh Rawal, Shilpa Shetty, Meezaan Jafri and Pranitha Subhash.

The film marks the comebacks of both Priyadarshan and Shilpa Shetty to Hindi cinema after eight years and fourteen years respectively.

Hungama 2 premiered on 23 July 2021 on Disney+ Hotstar. The film received negative reviews from critics who criticized its writing, direction and performances although Rajpal Yadav's performance was well received.

== Plot ==
Retired Jailor Govind Kapoor's family includes his older son Aman and Akash, and his younger brother. He also has four mischievous grandchildren. The twist in the story happens when Vani, Akash's college girlfriend comes to their home with a child named Gehna and claims the child's father is Akash. Akash refutes her claim. Akash is betrothed to the daughter of Manasvit G. Bajaj, Govind's friend.

Akash takes the help of Anjali Tiwari, his co-worker to help him to hide things about Vani and the child to not let anyone know about it. Anjali's husband Radhe Shyam Tiwari, a suspicious-minded lawyer, mistakenly assumes that his wife is having an affair and finds clues leading to Akash. Tiwari overhears them talking about the child, and wrongly assumes that Anjali is pregnant with Akash's child.

In a flashback, it is shown that Vani and Akash loved each other and the former left the latter suddenly without notice. They perform a DNA test, but due to their inability to read the medical terminology and the result, they are unable to reach a conclusion. Akash, now desperate tries to get his nieces and nephews to prank Vani so she will leave. One of their pranks ends up injuring Gehna. Vani take the blame to save the children from punishment and, in her act, wins over the children, becoming their nanny and friend.

Akash's engagement ceremony to Bajaj's daughter arrives and he tries to get Vani away from the ceremony without knowing that Bajaj invited her too, assuming she was the new teacher of Govind's grandchildren. Akash decides to change his bridal clothing mid-way. Anjali meets Akash mid-way with his bridal dress and changes in her car. Tiwari sees this, and assumes his wife is having sex with Akash. Akash and Anjali come to the engagement ceremony but Anjali spots Vani. Vani is taken back home by a Kapoor brother on the fabricated pretext that Gehna was injured, to the relief of the Kapoor family. Akash quickly gets engaged.

Tiwari confronts Anjali and Akash without stating he knows about their "apparent affair" but Akash and Anjali assume he knows about Vani, so they shrug it off. Appalled by their behavior, he tries to kill Akash. His first attempt lands him in hospital. Akash hires his and Vaani's old cafeteria manager (who is an excellent forger) to act as her husband, the same day Tiwari makes his second attempt to murder Akash. The cafeteria manager enters, but when asked he can't remember the child's name. Tiwari's second attempt to kill Akash botches up the cafeteria manager's plan, destroying forged documents. A stranger meets Vani secretly and tells her to be present on the day of their own 'wedding'.

On Akash's wedding reception, Tiwari gets drunk and blurts out about his wife's "apparent affair" with Akash. In the confusion, the truth about Vani and Gehna's presence is revealed. The bride's family call off the wedding. Akash gets drunk and tries to force himself on Vani to tell the truth. To prevent this, Vani tells the truth and also reveals that Gehna is neither hers nor Akash's child but is her deceased sister and Aman's child. Vani later leaves the house with Gehna. Akash and his family later decide that Vani and Akash should get married. They go out to find Vani. They arrive too late and find Vani already married. Vani hands over Gehna to Aman. However, the setup is revealed to be part of a television series, whose director is the stranger, revealed to be auteur Premnath Pannu. Pannu requests that the Kapoor family not disrupt production, as Vani has given him enough trouble by virtue of her absence during shooting and he is on deadline. Later, everyone reconciles and Akash and Vani get married.

== Cast ==
- Meezaan Jafri as Aakash "Akku" Kapoor
- Pranitha Subhash as Vaani Kapoor
- Shilpa Shetty as Anjali "Anju" Tiwari
- Paresh Rawal as Radhe Shyam Tiwari
- Ashutosh Rana as Colonel Govind Kapoor aka Junglee Bail: Aakash's father
- Tiku Talsania as Cook Ojasram Nandan
- Manoj Joshi as Manasvit G. Bajaj: Govind's partner
- Rajpal Yadav as Popat Jamal / Raja Dhatingarh Dhingra
- Johnny Lever as Gagan Chandra D'Costa
- Komal Sharma as Simran
- Siddhant Ghegadmal as Jayesh
- Raman Trikha as Aman Kapoor: Akash's brother
- Menka Rai as Chinki
- Atharv Johnny as Parul
- Hardika Sharma as Vidhi
- Naira Shah as Priti
- Akshaye Khanna as Premnath Pannu (cameo appearance)
- Nandu as Doctor (cameo appearance)

== Production ==
The film marks Priyadarshan's return to Bollywood after an eight-year hiatus since Rangrezz (2013). It is not a sequel to Hungama (2003), with Priyadarshan saying, "We decided to title the new comedy Hungama 2 because the mood of masti, mischief and hungama remain unchanged." It also marks the comeback of Shilpa Shetty for the first time in 14 years since Apne.

The principal photography commenced on 8 January 2020 in Mumbai. The film was initially scheduled for a theatrical release in India on 14 August 2020. However, production was halted due to the COVID-19 pandemic in India. Priyadarshan has indicated the filming is scheduled to resume in mid-September 2020. The film was wrapped up on 1 February 2021.

== Music ==
The music of film was composed by Anu Malik while the lyrics were written by Sameer Anjaan and Rani Malik.

The first song Chura Ke Dil Mera 2.0 is a remake of the song of the same name from the 1994 film Main Khiladi Tu Anari.

Track listing
| No. | Title | Singer(s) | Length |
|---|---|---|---|
| 1. | "Chura Ke Dil Mera 2.0" (Lyrics by Rani Malik) | Benny Dayal, Anmol Malik | 4:45 |
| 2. | "Chinta Na Kar" | Nakash Aziz, Neeti Mohan | 3:38 |
| 3. | "Hungama Ho Gaya" | Mika Singh, Anmol Malik | 4:25 |
| 4. | "Pehli Baar" | Benny Dayal | 4:15 |
| 5. | "Aao Chalen Hum" | Antara Mitra, Nakash Aziz | 3:50 |

== Release ==
Hungama 2 premiered on 23 July 2021 on Disney+ Hotstar.

== Reception ==
On the review aggregator website Rotten Tomatoes, 0% of 7 critics' reviews are positive, with an average rating of 3.3/10.

Saibal Chatterjee of NDTV gave the film 1 star and stated, "Priyadarshan was once feted for the controlled lunacy of his comedies. Here, the lunacy is intact. Control is conspicuous by its absence." Shubhra Gupta of The Indian Express gave the film 1.5 out of 5 stars and stated, "Only a few people keep you from fleeing this loud and obvious fare – a svelte Shilpa Shetty, Ashutosh Rana playing a curmudgeon, and Priyadarshan staple Paresh Rawal." Samrudhi Ghosh of Hindustan Times gave the film a negative review and stated, "Priyadarshan's chaotic comedy-of-errors is distressingly dated." Narendra Saini of NDTV India gave the film 2 out of 5 stars and stated, "[Priyadarshan] has a style of comedy, in which there is a lot of confusion and it is accompanied by a long army of stars. That's how he tries to laugh. But this time he misses out completely and tries to make the audience laugh through the old formula." Sudhanshu Maheshwari of Aaj Tak gave the film 2 out of 5 stars and stated, "In such a situation, there was some buzz about Hungama 2, but in the absence of comedy, it remained just a noisy film, which would not harm anyone in."
