= Sharmin Segal =

Indian actress

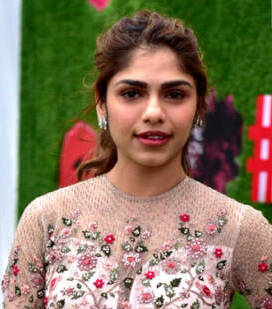
- Segal in 2019
- Born: Mumbai, Maharashtra, India
- Other name: Sharmin Segal Mehta
- Occupation: Actress
- Years active: 2019–present
- Spouse: Aman Mehta (m. 2023)
- Children: 1
- Relatives: Sanjay Leela Bhansali (maternal uncle); Mohan Segal (grandfather)

Sharmin Segal Mehta is an Indian actress who works in Hindi films. She began her career as an assistant director to her maternal uncle Sanjay Leela Bhansali, and made her acting debut in his production, Malaal (2019), receiving a nomination for the Filmfare Award for Best Female Debut. Segal has since starred in the film Atithi Bhooto Bhava (2022) and the series Heeramandi (2024).

== Early life ==
Segal was born to film editor Bela Bhansali Segal, who is the younger sister of Sanjay Leela Bhansali, and Deepak Segal, the content head of Applause Entertainment. She has a younger sister named Simran Segal and is the granddaughter of film director Mohan Segal, who introduced veteran actress Rekha to Hindi cinema.

Segal's maternal grandparents are film producers Navin Bhansali and Leela Bhansali. She completed her acting course from Lee Strasberg Theatre and Film Institute, New York.

In a 2019 interview, Segal opened up about being fat-shamed as a teenager. She mentioned that she was overweight as a teen and claimed that she was made fun of in school till she graduated. Talking about the current trend of promoting body positivity, she said that she was bullied for over 15 years and that she wasn't confident.

== Career ==
Segal started her career as an assistant director with Mary Kom (2014) and Bajirao Mastani (2015).

Segal made her acting debut in 2019 with Sanjay Leela Bhansali's Malaal. She portrayed Astha Tripathi opposite Meezaan Jafri. It received mixed reviews from critics. The Times of India praised the performance of debutants Meezaan and Sharmin and their onscreen chemistry, termed it as a 'simmering love story' with 'romantic and intense moments'. News18, termed the debut duo of Meezaan and Sharmin Segal 'charming in parts', but 'rough around the edges'. Segal received Filmfare Award for Best Female Debut nomination for her performance.

In 2022, she portrayed flight attendant Netra Banerjee opposite Pratik Gandhi, in ZEE5's Atithi Bhooto Bhava. It received mixed reviews from critics. Filmfare wrote, "Sharmin looks convincing as the girl who has a hard time adjusting to her man's quirks. She and Pratik comes out as a real couple." DNA India termed Segal as 'outstanding' and said that the film will leave you emotional.

In 2024, Segal appeared in Bhansali's series Heeramandi, playing poet Alamzeb, opposite Taha Shah Badussha. Her performance was unanimously panned; Devansh Sharma of Hindustan Times noted, "Sharmin lend the much-needed youthful energy, but her voice and dialogue delivery does not work in her favour;" while Shilajit Mitra of The Hindu, wrote that Alamzeb's character was "flatly played" by Segal. She also received wide criticism for her role, which was said to be "expressionless."

== Personal life ==
In November 2023, Sharmin married Aman Mehta, the executive director of Torrent Pharmaceuticals. The couple reportedly welcomed their first child, a boy, in May 2025.

Segal had conflicts with several of her Heeramandi co-stars during promotional interviews. In one interview, Sanjeeda Shaikh called director Sanjay Leela Bhansali a perfectionist, but Segal interrupted her and stated that perfectionist is a "basic word" to describe him and criticized Shaikh, suggesting her opinion was invalid because she was an outsider. Additionally, Segal's sarcastic remark referring to co-star Aditi Rao Hydari as an "obedient schoolgirl" due to her punctuality was poorly received. When these incidents went viral, Segal faced significant backlash on social media. However, she dismissed the criticism, arguing that her comments were taken out of context and that she was portrayed as more aggressive than she is. Subsequently, some of her co-stars denounced the trolling.

== Filmography ==
=== Films ===
Key
†	Denotes films that have not yet been released

Year	Title	Role	Notes	Ref.
2014	Mary Kom	—N/a	Assistant director	
2015	Bajirao Mastani	—N/a	Assistant director	
2019	Malaal	Astha Tripathi	Nomination—Filmfare Award for Best Female Debut	
2022	Atithi Bhooto Bhava	Netra Banerjee		

=== Television ===
Year	Title	Role	Notes	Ref.
2024	Heeramandi	Alamzeb "Alam"		
