= Khosla Ka Ghosla 2 =

Upcoming Indian film by Prashant Bhagia

- First look poster
- Directed by: Priya Mishra; Prashant Bhagia
- Written by: Rajesh Chawla; Shreya Srivastava; Vaibhav Suman
- Produced by: Bhushan Kumar; Krishan Kumar; Savita Raj Hiremath; Raaj Hiremath
- Starring: Anupam Kher; Boman Irani; Kiran Juneja; Vinay Pathak; Ranvir Shorey; Tara Sharma
- Cinematography: Chirantan Das
- Edited by: Ashish Vichare
- Music by: Songs: Tanishk Bagchi; Dhruv Dhalla; Sachet–Parampara; Background Score: Salim–Sulaiman
- Production companies: T-Series Films; Tandav Films
- Release date: 5 March 2027
- Country: India
- Language: Hindi

Khosla Ka Ghosla 2 (transl. Khosla's nest 2) is an upcoming Indian Hindi-language comedy drama film directed by Priya Mishra and Prashant Bhagia. It is produced by Bhushan Kumar, Krishan Kumar, Savita Raj Hiremath, Raaj Hiremath under T-Series Films and Tandav Films. Written by Rajesh Chawla, Shreya Srivastava and Vaibhav Suman, the film is sequel to Khosla Ka Ghosla. Anupam Kher, Boman Irani, Kiran Juneja, Vinay Pathak, Ranvir Shorey and Tara Sharma reprised their roles.

== Cast ==
- Anupam Kher as Kamal Kishore Khosla
- Boman Irani as Kishen Khurana
- Parvin Dabas as Chiraunji Lal "Cherry/Chirag" Khosla
- Vinay Pathak as Asif Iqbal
- Ranvir Shorey as Balwant "Bunty" Khosla
- Tara Sharma as Meghna Chopra/Imarti
- Kiran Juneja as Sudha Khosla
- Divya Khosla as Aakriti
- Ravi Kishan as Gaya Pandey
- Parvin Dabas as Cherry
- Rajendra Sethi as Vijendar
- Rupam Bajwa as Nikki Khosla
- Vinod Nagpal as Mr Amar Sawhney
- Nitesh Pandey as Mani
- Anusha Lall as Katori
- V K Sharma as Insan Singh
- Rajesh Sharma as Munjal
- Mrityunjay Pandey as Mirchandani

== Production ==
=== Development ===
Producer Savita Raj announced the sequel in October 2024. Boman Irani also confirmed about the film in August 2025. Prequel director Dibakar Banerjee walked away from the project as he didn't think he would be appropriate for it.

=== Casting ===
Original cast reprised their roles for the sequel. The sequel also added Ravi Kishan, Nishant Verma, Kangan Baruah Nangia, and Danish Iqbal. Divya Khosla was also confirmed in casting. Tanya Maniktala was also added to the cast.

=== Filming ===
Anupam Kher started shooting his part in Delhi from 3 January 2026 as his 550th film. Kher wrapped up in March. Tara Sharma wrapped up her part in February 2026.

== Release ==
The film was originally scheduled for theatrical release on 28 August 2026. But the release was postponed to unknown date. It is now scheduled for release on 5 March 2027.
