= Mitakshara Kumar =

Indian filmmaker and writer

- Born: 27 January; Meerut, Uttar Pradesh, India
- Occupation: Filmmaker
- Years active: 2008–present
- Known for: Heeramandi:The Diamond Bazaar; The Empire

Mitakshara Kumar is an Indian filmmaker and writer. Mitakshara graduated in B.A.(Hons.) Economics from Lady Shri Ram College for Women. After completing her graduation, she pursued direction from Film and Television Institute of India. She started her career as an assistant director on the Hindi film, Bluffmaster!, directed by Rohan Sippy. She produced an international feature-length American documentary, The Origin of Sound.

In 2015, Mitakshara joined Sanjay Leela Bhansali as an associate director on his magnum opuses Bajirao Mastani and Padmaavat. She is credited as the additional screenplay writer for Gangubai Kathiawadi.

Mitakshara Kumar made her directorial debut with The Empire for Disney+Hostar produced by Nikkhil Advani’s Emmay Entertainment. Heeramandi (2024), a Netflix period drama series, is her latest work as she directs this along with Sanjay Leela Bhansali.

== Films and series ==
- Heeramandi (2024)
- Gangubai Kathiawadi (2022)
- The Empire (2021)
- Padmaavat (2018)
- Bajirao Mastani (2015)
- Youngistaan (2014)
- Amar Must Die (2014)
- Rajjo (2013)
- The origin Of Sound
- I AM (2010)
- Dil Kabaddi (2008)
- Mummy Punjabi (2007)
- Bas Ek Pal (2006)
- Bluffmaster! (2005)
