= Heeramandi =

Indian television series by Sanjay Leela Bhansali

- Promotional poster
- Genre: Historical drama
- Created by: Sanjay Leela Bhansali
- Screenplay by: Sanjay Leela Bhansali; Dialogues: Divya Nidhi; Vibhu Puri
- Story by: Moin Baig
- Directed by: Sanjay Leela Bhansali; Episodic Director: Mitakshara Kumar; Vibhu Puri
- Starring: Manisha Koirala; Sonakshi Sinha; Aditi Rao Hydari; Richa Chadha; Sanjeeda Sheikh; Sharmin Segal; Taha Shah Badussha
- Music by: Songs: Sanjay Leela Bhansali; Background Score: Benedict Taylor; Naren Chandavarkar
- Country of origin: India
- Original language: Hindi
- No. of episodes: 8

Production
- Executive producers: Sanjay Leela Bhansali; Prerna Singh
- Cinematography: Sudeep Chatterjee; Mahesh Limaye; Huentsang Mohapatra; Ragul Dharuman
- Editor: Sanjay Leela Bhansali
- Production company: Bhansali Productions
- Budget: ₹200 crore

Original release
- Network: Netflix
- Release: 1 May 2024 – present

Heeramandi: The Diamond Bazaar is a 2024 Indian Hindi-language period drama television series created and directed by Sanjay Leela Bhansali. Set in the red-light district of Heera Mandi in Lahore during the Indian independence movement, the series explores the lives of tawaifs and their intersection with political and personal struggles under British colonial rule. The ensemble cast includes Manisha Koirala, Sonakshi Sinha, Aditi Rao Hydari, Richa Chadha, Sanjeeda Sheikh, Sharmin Segal, and Taha Shah Badussha.

The series premiered on Netflix on 1 May 2024 and received mixed reviews from critics. In June 2024, it was renewed for a second season.

At the 2024 Filmfare OTT Awards, Heeramandi: The Diamond Bazaar received a leading 17 nominations, including Best Drama Series, Best Director in a Drama Series (for Bhansali), and Best Supporting Actress in a Drama Series (for both Chadha and Sheikh), and won 5 awards, including Best Actress in a Drama Series (for Koirala).

== Premise ==
Set against the backdrop of the Indian independence movement in the 1940s, Heeramandi: The Diamond Bazaar chronicles the lives of tawaifs in the red-light district of Heera Mandi in Lahore.

== Cast ==
=== Main ===
- Manisha Koirala as Mallikajaan: (Note: "Jaan" in the names here being an endearing suffix, see Jan.) chief courtesan(tawaif) of Shahi Mahal
  - Abha Ranta as young Mallikajaan
- Sonakshi Sinha in a dual role as
  - Rehana Jahan: former chief courtesan of Shahi Mahal, Mallikajaan and Waheeda's elder sister
  - Fareedanjaan: chief courtesan of Khwabgah and Rehana's daughter
- Aditi Rao Hydari as Bibbojaan: Mallikajaan's elder daughter
- Richa Chadha as Lajwanti "Lajjo": Mallikajaan's foster daughter
- Sanjeeda Sheikh as Waheedajaan: Rehana and Mallikajaan's younger sister
  - Vaishnavi Ganatra as young Waheeda
- Sharmin Segal as Alamzeb: Mallikajaan's youngest daughter
- Taha Shah Badussha as Nawab Tajdar Baloch: an advocate and Alamzeb's lover

=== Recurring ===
- Farida Jalal as Qudsia Begum: Tajdar's grandmother
- Adhyayan Suman as Zoravar Ali Khan / Imaad: Mallikajaan's son and Lajjo's patron
- Fardeen Khan as Wali Bin Zayed-Al Mohammed: Bibbojaan's and later Fareedan's patron
- Shekhar Suman as Khan Bahadur Zulfikar Ahmed: Mallikajaan's patron
  - Adhyayan Suman as young Zulfikar
- Indresh Malik as Ustaad
- Jason Shah as Alastair Cartwright: Superintendent of Imperial Police
- Jayati Bhatia as Fathima "Phatto": Mallikajaan's maid
- Nivedita Bhargava as Satto: Mallikajaan's maid
- Bharti Sharma as Gurbaksh Kaur
- Shruti Sharma as Saima / Mirza Begum: Alamzeb's maid, Iqbal's lover
- Rajat Kaul as Iqbal "Balli" Singh: Mallikajaan's driver, Saima's lover
- Pratibha Ranta as Shama: Waheeda's daughter
- Anuj Sharma as Hamid Mohsin Ali
- Ajay Dhansu as Rizwan
- Mark Bennington as Samuel Henderson: Inspector General of Imperial Police
- Astha Mittal as Huma: Fareedan's maid
- Nasirr Khan as Choudhry Sahab
- Anju Mahendru as Phoophi
- Abhishek Deswal as Nawaz
- Ujjwal Chopra as Ashfaq Baloch: Tajdar's father
- Pankaj Bhatia as Feroze: Waheeda and Shama's patron

== Episodes ==
No.	Title	Directed by	Original release date
1	"Mallikajaan: The Queen of Heeramandi"	Sanjay Leela Bhansali	1 May 2024
In 1920 Lahore, at Heeramandi, Rehana, the authoritative tawaif of Shahi Mahal, coldly trades her younger sister Mallika's child for an ornament. Devastated, Mallika swears vengeance. Twenty five years later, Mallika (aka Mallikajaan) has become the unimpeded madam of Shahi Mahal. She turns down Gunther, an Englishman, who wants to record the voice of her eldest daughter, Bibbo. Waheeda, Mallikajaan's sister, purloins a part of Bibbo's earnings. Mallikajaan disregards her younger daughter Alam's apathy towards becoming a tawaif and announces her forthcoming debut as a courtesan. Lajjo, Mallika's foster daughter, is deeply in love with her patron Zoravar Ali Khan and expects to marry him. Tajdar Baloch, the intellectual son of Nawab Ashfaq Baloch, has just returned from Oxford and at a gathering, he professes his hatred for Heeramandi and its customs and also for the British Raj. Alastair Cartwright, the newly recruited Superintendent of Police, solicits Mallika, asking for one of her girls to perform at his private party but she bluntly rejects his proposition, claiming that Shahi Mahal will lose its exclusivity if its tawaifs perform at a private party. A humiliated Cartwright seduces Ustaad, the eunuch pimp, to uncover Mallika's secrets. Meanwhile, Alam, an aspiring poetess, attends a recital at Tajdar's residence and stumbles upon him. While love blossoms between Mallika's servants Iqbal and Saima, Bibbo learns from her patron Wali Mohammad that Samuel Henderson, the Inspector General of Imperial Police, might be passing on shoot-at-sight orders in response to the brewing rebellion on streets against the British Raj. Revealed to be a rebel herself, Bibbo notifies Hamid, her chief, of Henderson's intentions and gives him a revolver. Tajdar and Alam come across each other amidst riots; Hamid rescues Tajdar from being shot by a policeman while Alam disappears.
2	"Fareedanjaan: The Challenger Returns"	Sanjay Leela Bhansali	1 May 2024
In a flashback, Mallika suffocates Rehana to death in a rage and stages it a suicide with the assistance of her patron and lover Zulfikar, but leaves behind a witness: Rehana's daughter Fareedan. In the present, the residents of Shahi Mahal pay their respects to Rehana on her death anniversary. Waheeda asks Mallika for the possession of Khwabgah, a mansion presented to Rehana by a Nawab, Sammi Ali. Mallika delays the benefaction, citing that Sammi's widow has laid a claim for the inheritance of Khwabgah. Satto and Phatto, Mallika's attendants, discuss with Iqbal and Saima that a nine-year-old Fareedan was cruelly sold off to a merchant by Mallika. Meanwhile, Bibbo restrains Lajjo from pinning any hopes on Zoravar, revealing that he is about to marry a noblewoman. Lajjo visits Zoravar at a club and confirms Bibbo's contention regarding his wedding. Tajdar, having fallen in love with Alam, initiates a search for her. Zoravar summons an anguished Lajjo to perform at his wedding but she embarrasses him by confessing her feelings for him through her rendition, causing him to disrespect her. Mallika intercedes for Lajjo and condemns Zoravar, disclosing that he is her illegitimate son, who was sold off to a Nawab for adoption by Rehana. As Lajjo and Mallika depart, Lajjo, drunk and disoriented from her heartbreak hits her head when their carriage swerves and dies suddenly, devastating Mallika. To Mallika's surprise, a grown-up Fareedan attends the funeral and cautions Mallika about her imminent downfall.
3	"Waheedajaan: Scarred for Life"	Sanjay Leela Bhansali; Mitakshara Kumar; Vibhu Puri	1 May 2024
In a flashback, a teenage Waheeda, disclosing herself to be a witness of Rehana's murder, demands Khwabgah from Mallika, threatening to incarcerate her and Zulfikar otherwise. An outraged Zulfikar assaults her, scarring her face. In the present, Mallika and Waheeda receive the verdict in their favour, taking over Khwabgah but Mallika, contradictory to what she had promised to Waheeda, hands over the mansion to Sammi's family, so as to prevent Fareedan from suing her. Nonetheless, Fareedan buys the mansion from Sammi's widow and prepares to organize her nath-utrai. Through Ustaad, Fareedan discovers about Alam's tiff with Mallika and Cartwright's animosity towards the latter. Elsewhere, Tajdar attends a pro-independence gathering hosted by Hamid, intending to join the rebellion. Fareedan begins to dupe Alam under the pretext of uniting her with Tajdar. Further, she attempts to entice Wali and seduces Cartwright with an appeal to reopen Rehana's murder case. Intimidated by Fareedan's move, Zulfikar threatens Mallika to find and destroy a file pertaining to Rehana's case, which contains incriminating evidence against them. Mallika remembers asking Waheeda to stash the file but she claims to have burned it. Mallika opposes Fareedan's nath-utrai, arguing to the tawaif guild that women who have lost their virginity are not permitted to do so but Fareedan proceeds with it nevertheless. To restrain the Nawabs from attending her nath-utrai, Mallika forces Bibbo to make a final performance, which mandates their presence; Bibbo protests this sudden end to her career but is overruled. While Wali seethes at Bibbo’s supposed abandonment of both her art and him, Fareedan is left stranded on her big day, mourning her defeat.
4	"Alamzeb: The Innocent Pawn"	Sanjay Leela Bhansali; Mitakshara Kumar; Vibhu Puri	1 May 2024
Wali visits a grieving Fareedan and becomes her patron to spite Bibbo. Mallika, feeling Alam’s rise is threatened by Saima's beauty and talent for singing, decides to sell her to a mysterious buyer named Wajid Ali for a price of ₹10,000. Iqbal promises to earn the same amount within fifteen days to buy Saima's freedom and takes to gambling. Waheeda unveils her patron Feroz's interest in her daughter Shama and breaks down when Mallika declares Feroz as Shama's patron to appease him. Meanwhile, Hamid is unconvinced of Tajdar's sincerity towards the cause. Alam confides in Bibbo about Tajdar. Waheeda agrees to testify against Mallika and Zulfikar if she retains Khwabgah from Fareedan. Ashfaq discovers that Tajdar is involved with the rebels and warns him against it, emphasizing that their alliance with the British will uphold their social status. While Bibbo honey traps Henderson to grasp the government's secrets, Mallika has Iqbal apprehended by the police on grounds of gambling before he could earn the money. Alam implores Mallika to release Iqbal and stop the sale of Saima, agreeing to have her nath-utrai done in exchange. In prison, Cartwright vainly tries to provoke Iqbal against Mallika and torments him by revealing who was behind his arrest, but Iqbal refuses to turn against Mallika. On the day of Alam's nath-utrai, she receives a misleading letter from Fareedan, which she believes to have been sent by Tajdar, asking her to elope from the ceremony. For Alam's sake, Saima surrenders herself to her buyers Wajid and Ali, revealed to be two separate men who gang rape her. Alam ultimately runs away with Fareedan's help, causing a shattered Mallika to call off the event.
5	"Tajdar: The Lover's Dilemma"	Sanjay Leela Bhansali; Mitakshara Kumar; Vibhu Puri	1 May 2024
Alam meets Tajdar at his residence and realizes that she has been betrayed; Tajdar refuses to accept her upon discovering her lineage and insists her to leave. However, he repents his actions and takes her in, introducing her to his family as a friend's sister. In Khwabgah, Fareedan hosts a loud, drunken party to mock Mallika and all of Heeramandi. At the Baloch residence, Alam rekindles her relationship with Tajdar and builds a good rapport with his paternal grandmother Qudsia Begum, who even contemplates getting her married to Tajdar. Waheeda tries to make Henderson as her patron but realizes that he has an affair with Bibbo. She meets Fareedan and reveals that she'd never burned the file, hoping to use it against Mallika and Zulfikar. Ustaad spots Alam at the market with Qudsia and notifies Mallika of it. Mallika pays a visit to the Baloch residence amidst the festivities of Eid al-Fitr, exposing Alam's true identity. Ashfaq clashes with Tajdar over his love affair with a tawaif's daughter and ousts him from the household.
6	"Tajdar & Alamzeb: Nation vs. Love"	Sanjay Leela Bhansali; Mitakshara Kumar; Vibhu Puri	1 May 2024
Alamzeb and Tajdar arrive at Amrood Kothi, a bungalow left in Tajdar's possession by his late mother. Mallika goes on a voyage to Murree with Zulfikar while Waheeda retrieves the file from Shahi Mahal and hands it over to Fareedan but they are compelled to wait for fifteen days as Cartwright is told to have gone out of station. Alam eavesdrops on a conversation between Tajdar and his friend, discovering that he is a rebel but assures them that she will not come in his way. In Murree, Zulfikar gathers incriminating evidence against Fareedan and reveals to Mallika that she is a wanted criminal, having committed murder and arson at a very young age. Returning home, Mallika threatens Fareedan with the proof of her crimes, causing her to destroy the file. Deceived by Fareedan, an agonized Waheeda turns to Mallika and asks for forgiveness. Iqbal is freed from prison but he is told that Saima has run away. Bibbo, through Henderson, discovers that the army has shipped a consignment of Enfield rifles to Lahore. Hamid and his team plan to loot the ammunition; Tajdar schedules his wedding with Alam and hosts a party on the same account, with the intent of distracting the officials from the consignment. He leaves to execute the robbery while Fareedan, a guest of the party, explores Amrood Kothi and realizes that Tajdar is a rebel. After Hamid, Tajdar and his team successfully loot the ammunition, Fareedan reveals the culprits to Cartwright, asking him to incarcerate Mallika and Zulfikar in return. On the day of Alam and Tajdar's wedding, Cartwright carries out a raid on Amrood Kothi in the latter's absence and arrests Alam on grounds of rebellion. Compelled by Hamid and persuaded by Alam’s selfless testimony that she was the only perpetrator, Tajdar reluctantly testifies against Alam at the police station.
7	"Bibbojaan: Long Live the Revolution"	Sanjay Leela Bhansali; Mitakshara Kumar; Vibhu Puri	1 May 2024
Bibbo rebukes Mallika for leaving Alam to her own fate. Affected, Mallika visits the police stations and allows herself to be gang-raped by Cartwright and his colleagues in exchange for Alam's freedom. Later that night, she breaks down in the middle of the street and the residents of Shahi Mahal curse Fareedan for inciting Cartwright to such brutality; Fareedan, shocked by Mallika’s shattered psyche, is disheartened by Cartwright's cruelty and states that while she hates her aunt, no woman would ever want such brutality for another woman. While Mallika unravels, Alam informs Bibbo about her pregnancy but tells her that she wouldn't want herself and her unborn child to be an obstacle for Tajdar's cause. Later, Bibbo notifies Tajdar of Alam's pregnancy and reprimands him for abandoning Alam. Repenting his actions, Tajdar apprises his father of his intentions to marry Alam and upon receiving no support from him, he departs to Heeramandi with Qudsia, so as to persuade Mallika to accept their relationship. Wary of Tajdar’s intent after so much trauma, Mallika agrees to orchestrate their wedding but threatens to have Alam's nath-utrai done if he doesn't make it on time on the wedding day. Ustaad enlightens Iqbal, Satto and Phatto that Saima has become a popular singer in Calcutta; when Iqbal states his feelings of betrayal, Ustaad has a moment of compassion and informs of Mallika's vile deeds against him and Saima, leaving him shattered. Bibbo invites Fareedan to Alam's wedding and she expresses her genuine contentment for the first wedding of Heeramandi. Enraged by his son’s defiance, Ashfaq apprises the police of Tajdar's connection with the rebels and has him apprehended for a time being to stop the wedding from taking place, but contrary to what Cartwright had promised Ashfaq, he viciously tortures Tajdar to comprehend the details of his fellow rebels. When the wedding procession doesn't arrive, Mallika asks Alam to change from her wedding gown to a dance costume for her nath-utrai. Realizing that Tajdar has been arrested, Fareedan rushes to the police station and vainly pleads with Cartwright to free Tajdar. She helplessly witnesses Tajdar succumb to the torture and returns to Shahi Mahal, breaking the news of Tajdar's death to Bibbo, who halts the event and notifies Alam of Tajdar's demise. An anguished Alam faints.
8	"Heeramandi: The Swan Song"	Sanjay Leela Bhansali; Mitakshara Kumar; Vibhu Puri	1 May 2024
In a desperate effort to rouse Alam from her shock, Bibbo and Waheeda take Alam to Tajdar's grave so she may mourn his death. Cartwright and Henderson lie to Ashfaq that the rebels have assassinated Tajdar to save themselves from being exposed. Mallika and Fareedan make peace with each other; the former asks Fareedan to be her successor, but Fareedan declines, agreeing that their rivalry can wait until Heeramandi’s survival is assured. Bibbo shelters her fellow rebels in Shahi Mahal with Mallika's support. Fareedan declares to Wali sahab that she is willing to spend the rest of her life for the country's independence; though he doubts the cause will succeed, they part on good terms. Alam discloses to Qudsia that she is pregnant. Discovering that the tawaifs have been supporting the rebellion, the Nawabs boycott Heeramandi to be in the British government's good books. While Heeramandi loses its pomp and splendour, Mallika appeals to Zulfikar and his wife to sway the nawabs, but is rebuffed; at the guild hall, Bibbo motivates the tawaifs to fight for the country's Independence, asserting that none other than them are aware of the value of freedom. They symbolically put away their musical instruments and costumes, the tools of their trade, and prepare for war. Hamid and the rebels plan to assassinate Henderson, and Bibbo comes forward to execute the mission. She successfully shoots Henderson to death at a conference but Cartwright manages to kill Hamid and apprehends Bibbo. Mallika is informed of Bibbo's arrest and impending execution; despite the horror, she conveys her pride in her daughter. Led by Mallika, Fareedan and Waheeda, all the tawaifs take to streets amidst a strict curfew and march towards the prison on the day of Bibbo's execution to express their support for the rebellion. Meanwhile, Alam visits Cartwright under the pretext of offering sex in exchange for money but shoots him down with a revolver given by Ustaad, avenging Tajdar's death. Elsewhere, the tawaifs manage to arrive at the prison, where they chant the slogan "Inquilab Zindabad" while a gratified Bibbo is shot and executed. The series concludes with all the women of Heeramandi looking towards the audience, enraged with the spirit of rebellion, torches in hand. The closing monologue states that while many tawaifs played a role in the Independence movement, many of them have been overlooked by historians, and that while Independence brought freedom for India, it spelled the end of the tawaif way of life.

== Production ==
Heeramandi: The Diamond Bazaar was officially announced in April 2021 as a long-gestating project conceived by Sanjay Leela Bhansali nearly 14 years earlier. The eight-episode series, marking Bhansali's debut in the streaming space, commenced principal photography in June 2022. Filming concluded in June 2023, following reshoots requested by Bhansali in May of that year. According to Bollywood Hungama, Bhansali directed the pilot episode, while the remaining episodes were helmed by Mitakshara Kumar—Bhansali's former associate director on Bajirao Mastani (2015) and Padmaavat (2018)—who replaced Vibhu Puri, the initially appointed director.

In a 2023 conversation with Netflix co-CEO Ted Sarandos, Bhansali described Heeramandi as his "biggest project," and cited Mother India (1957), Mughal-e-Azam (1960), and Pakeezah (1972) as key influences on the series’ tone and visual aesthetic. Costume designers Rimple and Harpreet Narula noted that the wardrobe for the series drew inspiration from the styles of vintage film personalities such as Patience Cooper, Suraiya, Swaran Lata, Noor Jehan, Shamshad Begum, and Mukhtar Begum. In a separate interview with Lilly Singh, Bhansali revealed that he had initially hoped to cast Pakistani actors Mahira Khan, Fawad Khan, and Imran Abbas, but plans were shelved due to the prevailing ban on cross-border artistic collaborations between India and Pakistan.

== Soundtrack ==
The first track from the soundtrack, "Sakal Ban," composed by Sanjay Leela Bhansali with lyrics attributed to Amir Khusrau and vocals by Raja Hasan, was released on 8 March 2024. The second song, "Tilasmi Bahein," performed by Sharmistha Chatterjee, was released on 2 April 2024. The album also features traditional folk songs such as "Phool Gendwa Na Maaro" and "Nazariya Ki Maari," which had previously appeared in Dooj Ka Chand (1964) and Pakeezah (1972), respectively. The complete soundtrack, released under the Bhansali Music label, became available on 24 April 2024.

Each classical composition is choreographed to feature members of the principal cast, often as part of mujra performances. "Tilasmi Bahein" is performed by Sonakshi Sinha, while "Phool Gendwa Na Maaro" and "Saiyaan Hatto Jaao" are picturized on Aditi Rao Hydari. "Chaudhavi Shab" features Sharmin Segal, "Nazariya Ki Maari" is performed by Sanjeeda Sheikh, and "Masoom Dil Hai Mera" by Richa Chadha. The songs "Sakal Ban" and "Azadi" include appearances by most of the primary female cast.

== Release ==
A teaser for the series was released in February 2024, with Netflix announcing a planned release later that year. In March, it was confirmed that the series would premiere on 1 May 2024.

== Reception ==
=== Viewership ===
During the week of 29 April to 5 May 2024, Heeramandi: The Diamond Bazaar ranked as the second most-watched non-English television series on Netflix globally. The series garnered 4.5 million views and accumulated 33 million viewing hours during its debut week, setting a record for the highest viewership for an Indian series in its opening week on the platform. It topped Netflix charts in 10 countries and appeared in the top ten list in 43 countries worldwide.

=== Critical response ===
On the review aggregator website Rotten Tomatoes, 46% of 13 critic reviews are positive, with an average rating of 5.8/10.

Shilajit Mitra of The Hindu described the series as "stunning to behold," citing its expansive production values. Dhaval Roy of The Times of India noted that while the series "might feel like a long watch," its cinematic quality "will linger on long after its conclusion."

Lachmi Deb Roy of Firstpost awarded the series 4 out of 5 stars, calling it "a treat to the eyes" and "a lesson of history." Saibal Chatterjee of NDTV gave it 3 stars, commending Sanjay Leela Bhansali's thematic ambition and observing that, amid the show's opulence, it promotes the subcontinent's syncretic cultural heritage—a theme he deemed particularly relevant in contemporary India.

Sukanya Verma of Rediff.com rated the series 3 out of 5, writing that it "mirrors Bhansali's film-making's finest and frustrating features," reflecting both artistic grandeur and narrative excess. Shubhra Gupta of The Indian Express gave the show 2.5 stars, commenting that while Bhansali's signature visual flair is evident, the story aims to portray the lives of courtesans who were once central to Indian popular culture.

Classical dancer and founder of The Courtesan Project, Manjari Chaturvedi, criticized the series for conflating tawaifs with prostitutes, arguing that it fails to accurately portray the educational and cultural significance of historical courtesans. She also expressed concern that the show neglects essential references to the authentic tawaif tradition.

== Accolades ==
=== Awards and nominations ===
Name of the award ceremony, year presented, category, nominee of the award, and the result of the nomination
Award	Date of the ceremony	Category	Recipients	Result	Ref.
Indian Film Festival of Melbourne	16 August 2024	Best OTT Series	Heeramandi	Nominated	
Asia Contents Awards & Global OTT Awards	6 October 2024	Best OTT Original	Heeramandi	Nominated	
Asia Contents Awards & Global OTT Awards	6 October 2024	Best Original Song	"Sakal Ban"	Nominated	
Filmfare OTT Awards	1 December 2024	Best Drama Series	Heeramandi	Nominated	
Filmfare OTT Awards	1 December 2024	Best Director in a Drama Series	Sanjay Leela Bhansali	Nominated	
Filmfare OTT Awards	1 December 2024	Best Actress in a Drama Series	Manisha Koirala	Won	
Filmfare OTT Awards	1 December 2024	Best Supporting Actress in a Drama Series	Richa Chadha	Nominated	
Filmfare OTT Awards	1 December 2024	Best Supporting Actress in a Drama Series	Sanjeeda Sheikh	Nominated	
Filmfare OTT Awards	1 December 2024	Best Original Story (Series)	Moin Beg	Nominated	
Filmfare OTT Awards	1 December 2024	Best Original Screenplay (Series)	Sanjay Leela Bhansali and Vibhu Puri	Nominated	
Filmfare OTT Awards	1 December 2024	Best Original Dialogue (Series)	Divya Nidhi and Vibhu Puri	Nominated	
Filmfare OTT Awards	1 December 2024	Best Background Music (Series)	Benedict Taylor and Naren Chandavarkar	Nominated	
Filmfare OTT Awards	1 December 2024	Best Original Soundtrack (Series)	Sanjay Leela Bhansali, Raja Hasan, and Sharmistha Chatterjee	Won	
Filmfare OTT Awards	1 December 2024	Best Production Design (Series)	Subrata Chakraborty and Amit Roy	Won	
Filmfare OTT Awards	1 December 2024	Best Cinematographer (Series)	Sudeep Chatterjee, Mahesh Limaye, Huenstang Mohapatra, and Ragul Herian Dharuman	Won	
Filmfare OTT Awards	1 December 2024	Best Costume Design (Series)	Rimple, Harpreet Narula, and Chandrakant Sonawane	Won	
Filmfare OTT Awards	1 December 2024	Best VFX (Series)	Vinay Singh Chuphal (FutureWorks)	Nominated	
Filmfare OTT Awards	1 December 2024	Best Editing (Series)	Sanjay Leela Bhansali	Nominated	
Filmfare OTT Awards	1 December 2024	Best Sound Design (Series)	Sanal George	Nominated	
Asian Academy Creative Awards	3–4 December 2024	Best Actress in a Leading Role (India)	Manisha Koirala	Won	
Asian Academy Creative Awards	3–4 December 2024	Best Cinematography (Fiction) (India)	Sudeep Chatterjee	Won	
Asian Academy Creative Awards	3–4 December 2024	Best Visual or Special FX (TV or Feature Film) (India)	FutureWorks	Won	

== Sequel ==
Following the massive success of the series as it generated the highest viewership ever for any show by Netflix India, Heeramandi was renewed for a second season. A 'Season 2 Announcement' video was dropped on 3 June 2024. However, the streaming date of the new season has not yet been informed.

== See also ==
- Rajkahini (2015) – Indian Bengali-language film centered on a group of prostitutes during the Partition of India
- Begum Jaan (2017) – Hindi-language remake of Rajkahini, also set against the backdrop of Partition
- Jaanisaar (2015) – Hindi-language film focusing on tawaifs during the Indian Rebellion of 1857
- Kalank (2019) – period drama involving tawaifs, set in pre-Partition India
