= The Miranda Brothers =

- Official release poster
- Directed by: Sanjay Gupta
- Written by: Sanjay Gupta; Sameer Hafiz; Milap Zaveri
- Produced by: Anuradha Gupta; Sanjay Gupta
- Starring: Harshvardhan Rane; Meezaan Jafri
- Cinematography: Shikhar Bhatnagar
- Edited by: Manish More
- Production company: White Feather Films
- Distributed by: JioCinema
- Release date: 25 October 2024
- Running time: 99 minutes
- Country: India
- Language: Hindi

The Miranda Brothers is a 2024 Indian Hindi-language sports drama film directed and written by Sanjay Gupta. Produced under the banner of White Feather Films, the film stars Harshvardhan Rane and Meezaan Jafri. It was released on JioCinema on 25 October 2024.

== Cast ==
- Harshvardhan Rane as Julio Miranda
- Meezaan Jafri as Regalo Miranda
- Manasi Joshi Roy as Susan Miranda
- Jeniffer Piccinato as Isabella
- Sahher Bambba as Sol
- Rahul Dev as Morocho
- Sanjay Suri as coach Carter
- Naved Jaffrey as coach Guerrera

== Production ==
The film was announced in February 2022. Principal photography commenced the following month. The film was mainly shot in Goa before wrapping up in April 2022.

== Music ==
The Miranda Brothers

Soundtrack album
- Released: 25 October 2024
- Genre: Feature film soundtrack
- Length: 9:05
- Language: Hindi
- Label: T-Series

Official audio
- The Miranda Brothers (Audio Jukebox) on YouTube

The song "Pyaar Bhi Jhootha," from the 1981 film Zamane Ko Dikhana Hai, sung by R. D. Burman is recreated for the film.

Track listing
No.	Title	Lyrics	Music	Singer(s)	Length
1.	"Be My Mehbooba"	Kumaar	Amaal Mallik	Darshan Raval, Neeti Mohan	3:13
2.	"Pyaar Bhi Jhootha"	Tanishk Bagchi, Majrooh Sultanpuri	Tanishk Bagchi, R. D. Burman	Yo Yo Honey Singh, B Praak	2:51
3.	"Sun Mere Bhai"	Yasser Desai	Zain Desai	Yasser Desai	3:01
Total length:					9:05

== Release ==
In June 2024, it was announced that the film was heading for a streaming release on the OTT platform JioCinema.

== Reception ==
Deepa Gahlot of Rediff.com gave the film 2 out of 5 stars. Troy Ribeiro of The Free Press Journal rated the film 3/5 stars.
