= Yaariyan 2 =

2023 Indian film by Radhika Rao & Vinay Sapru

- Theatrical release poster
- Directed by: Radhika Rao; Vinay Sapru
- Screenplay by: Radhika Rao; Vinay Sapru
- Story by: Anjali Menon
- Based on: Bangalore Days (2014) by Anjali Menon
- Produced by: Bhushan Kumar; Divya Khosla Kumar; Krishan Kumar; Aayush Maheshwari
- Starring: Divya Khosla Kumar; Yash Dasgupta; Pearl V Puri; Meezaan Jafri; Anaswara Rajan; Hira Warina
- Cinematography: Ravi Yadav
- Edited by: Abishek Kumar Singh
- Music by: Songs: Manan Bhardwaj; Khaalif; Rahim Shah; Yo Yo Honey Singh; Background Score: JAM8
- Production companies: T-Series Films; Rao And Sapru Films; BLM Motion Pictures
- Distributed by: AA Films
- Release date: 20 October 2023
- Running time: 148 minutes
- Country: India
- Language: Hindi
- Budget: ₹25 crore
- Box office: ₹2.67 crore

Yaariyan 2 is a 2023 Indian Hindi-language coming-of-age romantic drama film written and directed by Radhika Rao and Vinay Sapru and produced by Bhushan Kumar, Divya Khosla Kumar, Krishan Kumar and Aayush Maheshwari under T-Series Films, Rao and Sapru Films and BLM Motion Pictures. A spiritual successor to Khosla Kumar's 2014 directorial debut film Yaariyan and a remake of the 2014 Malayalam film Bangalore Days originally written and directed by Anjali Menon, it stars Divya Khosla Kumar alongside Yash Dasgupta, Pearl V Puri, Meezaan Jafri, Anaswara Rajan, Priya Prakash Varrier and Hira Warina. The film was a box-office bomb.

== Plot ==
Laadli is a recovering thalassemia patient living in Shimla with her mother, who wants her to get married into a good family. But Laadli aspires to win a beauty pageant and build a career. Abhay Singh Katyal, a man introduced to her by her mother, becomes interested in Laadli after learning about her disease and her honesty. They get married, and Laadli calls her cousins Shikhar Randhawa and Bajrang "Bajju" Das Khatri to attend the wedding. After the marriage, Abhay avoids Laadli by claiming he has a meeting with his manager. They later move to Mumbai, living a soulless married life.

Shikhar is a daredevil bike racer who helps his female friend escape from her wedding, leading to the groom canceling his agreement to never race again as revenge. He goes to Mumbai to stay with Bajju, who is a simple guy struggling with a 9-to-5 job to support his family. Shikhar changes his phone number to one belonging to someone named Jeh, who has passed away. He receives a call from Ikroor "Rooh" Awasthi, a paraplegic girl who believes she can hear Jeh's voice in a voice note. Shikhar sympathizes with her and falls in love with her. Bajju also falls in love with Shona, an air hostess who uses him to make her ex-boyfriend jealous. Eventually, the three of them begin dealing with heartbreak as Laadli discovers Abhay's past.

== Cast ==
- Divya Khosla Kumar as Laadli Chibber Singh Katyal
- Yash Dasgupta as Abhay Singh Katyal, Laadli's husband
- Pearl V Puri as Bajrang Das Khatri / Bajju, Devi's husband and Laadli's cousin
- Meezaan Jafri as Shikhar Randhawa, a pizza delivery boy, motocross racer, Laadli's cousin
- Anaswara Rajan as Ikroor Awasthi / Rooh, a train ticket counter, Shikhar's love interest later his wife
- Hira Warina as Shona, an air Hostess who has a brief encounter with Bajju
- Priya Prakash Varrier as Devi, Bajju's Wife (cameo appearance)
- Murali Sharma as Mr. Cariappa, Raajlaxmi's father
- Pyumori Mehta Ghosh as Mrs. Cariappa, Raajlaxmi's mother
- Lillete Dubey as Mrs. Chibber, Laadli's mother
- Sudhir Pandey as Bajju's office boss
- Rituraj Singh as Bajju's office boss's younger brother
- Sakshi Pradhan as Siraa, Rooh's sister, female locopilot
- Manasi Moghe as Laadli's friend, dance partner in the song "Suit Patiala"
- Karan Singh Chhabra as Laadli's friend's husband in the song "Suit Patiala"
- Siddharth Menon as a singer who loved Laadli since childhood, dance partner in the song "Suit Patiala"
- Harmanjeet Singh as member of the opposing team and Shikhar's rival
- Akanksha Singh as Rooh's colleague friend
- Akshit Sukhija as Stuart, Shona's boyfriend
- Dragta Ji as Beauty contest anchor
- Usha Subramanian Saksena as Bajju's mother
- Bhagyashri Borse as Raajlaxmi Cariappa / Raaji, a painter, Abhay's late girlfriend

== Production ==
The film is being directed by Radhika Rao and Vinay Sapru who have previously directed the films Lucky: No Time for Love and Sanam Teri Kasam. The project was announced in October 2022 and at the time the studio had planned the movie for release in May 2023. In January 2023, T Series revealed the film would be released in October 2023.

The first schedule of shooting happened in June 2022 in Shimla, Himachal Pradesh. The second schedule of the shoot took place in Mumbai in 2022 which included filming at the Charni Road railway station overbridge. Parts of the film were shot in the United Kingdom, where Khosla Kumar suffered an injury while shooting an action sequence. A few of the scenes in the film were shot on the outskirts of Bengaluru.

== Release ==
Yaariyan 2 was released on 20 October 2023.

== Soundtrack ==
The music for the film has been composed by Manan Bhardwaj, Khaalif, Rahim Shah and Yo Yo Honey Singh. The first soundtrack was released on 24 September 2023, and second soundtrack was released on 12 November 2023.

== Controversy ==
A First information report (FIR, a type of police complaint) was registered against the makers of the film on a complaint from the Sikh Talmel Committee for hurting religious sentiment where the lead actor Meezaan Jafri was shown wearing a kirpan in the song "Saure Ghar". A kirpan is one of the five sacred symbols (kakaars) that every baptised Sikh carries on his person. According to the Sikh code of conduct, a non-baptised Sikh or a non-Sikh is not permitted to wear a kirpan (Jafri being a Muslim). The film became involved in a further controversy when the Shiromani Gurdwara Parbandhak Committee (SGPC) lodged a complaint against the company T-Series, the directors Radhika Rao and Vinay Sapru, and actor Meezaan Jafri. The FIR was filed at the E Division Police Station by Amritsar Police under Section 295A of the Indian Penal Code in an effort to purposefully arouse religious sentiments among the Sikh communities.

The actor and the makers apologised for unintentionally hurting any religious sentiments and removed the scenes, clarifying that Jafri was in fact wearing a Khukri, which looks similar to a kirpan and is a small weapon with no religious significance.

== Reception ==
Yaariyan 2 received mixed reviews from critics. Dhaval Roy of The Times of India gave a rating of 3 out of 5 and wrote, "Yaariyan 2 may appeal to fans of romance and drama as it's packed with both. But a tightly-knit narrative would have made the film far more engaging." Subhash K Jha of Times Now gave a rating of 4 out of 5 and wrote, "Co-directors Radhika Rao and Vinay Sapru have done a swell job of adapting Anjali Menon's Malayalam gem Bangalore Days. Cosily capturing the high and low tides in the relationship among three cousins, two men and one woman, Yaariyan 2 does a surprisingly solid job of making these urban characters look believable and likable." A critic from Bollywood Hungama rated the film 3.5/5 stars and wrote "Yaariyan 2 is a decent entertainer with Divya Khosla Kumar's fine performance."

Deepa Gahlot of Rediff.com gave a rating of 2 out of 5 and wrote, "Yaariyan 2 does evoke a tinge of nostalgia for the time when music used to be the mainstay of a commercial film." Vinamra Mathur of Firstpost gave a rating of 2 out of 5 and wrote, "Yaariyan 2 is likely to create that room of lull all over again. It is not as unwatchable as it is unnecessary and barely does anything for the leads".

Rishil Jogani of Pinkvilla gave a rating of 2.5 out of 5 and wrote, "Yaariyan 2 could have been an enjoyably filmy Bollywood film but it feel lengthy, especially in the second hour. A few redeeming performances and good songs can make Yaariyan 2 a decent film for those who enjoy the filmy-ness in Bollywood films."
