= Malaal (film) =

2019 Indian film by Mangesh Hadawale

- Theatrical release poster
- Directed by: Mangesh Hadawale
- Written by: Mangesh Hadawale; Sanjeev; Sanjay Leela Bhansali
- Story by: Selvaraghavan
- Based on: 7G Rainbow Colony by Selvaraghavan
- Produced by: Bhushan Kumar; Krishan Kumar; Sanjay Leela Bhansali; Mahaveer Jain
- Starring: Meezaan Jafri; Sharmin Segal
- Cinematography: Ragul Dharuman
- Edited by: Rajesh G. Pandey
- Music by: Songs: Sanjay Leela Bhansali; Shreyas Puranik; Shail Hada; Score: Sanchit Balhara and Ankit Balhara
- Production companies: Bhansali Productions; T-Series
- Release date: 5 July 2019
- Running time: 136 minutes
- Country: India
- Language: Hindi
- Box office: est. ₹2.50 crore

Malaal (transl. Regret) is a 2019 Indian Hindi-language romantic drama film written and directed by Mangesh Hadawale in his Hindi directorial debut and produced by Sanjay Leela Bhansali, Bhushan Kumar, Mahaveer Jain and Krishan Kumar. A remake of the 2004 Tamil-Telugu bilingual film 7G Rainbow Colony by writer-director Selvaraghavan, it follows a contemporary love story between Astha Tripathi and Shiva More, played by debutants Sharmin Segal and Meezaan Jafri, who are from contrasting backgrounds and live in a Mumbai chawl.

The film was theatrically released in India on 5 July 2019.

== Plot ==
Shiva More is an unemployed Marathi youth who is unable to get a job and is a final year B.A. student living in a chawl in Mumbai. During a local cricket match, Sawant, the Marathi fanatic politician in town, notices Shiva and recruits him into his party, so he and his friends are given the task of prohibiting migration from North India in order to protect Maharashtrian interests. Some days later, Astha Tripathi, a young woman who has relocated from her palatial bungalow moves into the chawl with her family, comprising her mother Rajni, father Umashankar and brother Deepu. Umashankar lost a lot of money in faulty investments and hence the family's fortunes fell. Shiva and his friends have constant altercations with Astha and her family in the initial days, but one night when Astha confronts him alone and advises him to prove his worth, Shiva makes an impressive response, and they start talking to each other. Even as she is set to marry her childhood friend Aditya, who hates him, Astha is drawn to Shiva and befriends him after Shiva fights off some goons in Aditya's employ. All this while, Shiva has constantly been earning the ire of his parents, who want him to do something. Astha begins tutoring Shiva's sister, and the radically opposite duo get attracted to each other, more so during the Ganesh Chaturthi celebrations.

Shiva falls head over heels in love with Astha and tries confessing his feelings to her quite a few times. He gets roughed up by the public when he is mistakenly accused of trying to molest her, when the bus they were traveling on suddenly brakes and he is hurled towards her. Astha's stance towards Shiva softens when she observes his restraint and realizes his intentions were honest. Later on, Shiva leaves Sawant's side and Astha relents and spends an entire day with him. He takes her to the Siddhivinayak Temple when Rajni and Umashankar are out of town, but the two return earlier, only to find Astha with Shiva. Angered, they try to separate Shiva from Astha, but he remains firm in his decision to wait for Astha, who promises to him that she will try talking to her parents if he tops his exams. However, on the day of the exam, he is framed for cheating, and ends up unwittingly slapping the proctor in trying to prove his innocence. The action gets him arrested and his father and Astha bail him out. As Astha's parents force her to go out on a dinner date with Aditya on the same night this happens, Shiva feels disheartened seeing them together. However, Astha confesses to her diary that she loves Shiva the way he is and has a lot of expectations from him. She confronts Shiva the next evening as he is drinking with his friend and advises him to move on from the unfortunate episode in the exam hall. She then introduces him to a successful stock broker who agrees to employ Shiva in his firm. Initially Shiva is reluctant because he has to work his way up from the bottom but Astha persuades him and when the stock broker informs him of Astha's concern for him, he accepts. He quickly gets his way through, and settles well in his job, reconciling with his parents after giving them his first pay cheque.

Astha expects Shiva to open his bank account, but when he finds out that she is now engaged to Aditya, Shiva storms out in anger, while Astha moves out of the chawl. Several days later, he is able to track down Astha to her house, and convinces her. When they next meet, Astha takes Shiva to her friend's house, where they end up making love, and Astha tells him about her impending marriage, to which Shiva reacts by breaking down and promising to her that he will always be there for her, and she could have prevented all this fiasco in the first place.

While they are walking away, Astha realizes she forgot the keys to her friend's house, and starts walking back as she tells Shiva to wait, when she is suddenly hit by a truck. He tries to save her, but is hit by a car. News reaches both families, and Shiva survives, but upon recovery, he is shocked beyond words to find Astha dead, and his guilt of not having to spend the last moments peacefully with her gets the better of him and he is depressed for awhile. Meanwhile, Rajni visits Shiva's house and leaves him Astha's diary, in which she wrote how much she loved him over and over again. Shiva is able to break free from his grief and move on. The scene shifts to present day, where he has just finished reading the diary again, having become a successful trader, and imagines Astha standing by his side, proud of him. She asks him why isn't he married. He responds that she should marry him. She smiles and the movie ends.

== Cast ==
- Meezaan Jafri as Shiva More
- Sharmin Segal as Astha Tripathi
- Sameer Dharmadhikari as Sawant
- Sonal Jha as Rajni Tripathi, Astha's mother
- Ishwak Singh as Aditya, Astha's childhood friend
- Sanjay Gurbaxani as Umashankar Tripathi, Astha's father
- Anil Gawas as Prabhakar More, Shiva's father
- Chinmayee Surve as Vijaya More, Shiva's mother
- Badri Chavan as Nandu, Shiva's best friend
- Chetan Chitnis as Babban, Shiva's crony
- Sunil Tawde as Mr. Bhonsle, Astha's landlord
- Prachi Kadam as Sonu More, Shiva's sister

== Production ==
Principal photography began in September 2018 in Mumbai. The second schedule of the filming was planned in foreign locations. Filming was concluded in March 2019.

== Soundtrack ==
Malaal

Soundtrack album by Sanjay Leela Bhansali, Shreyas Puranik and Shail Hada
- Released: 21 June 2019
- Recorded: 2019
- Studios: Mixed and Mastered: Rahul M Sharma @AMV Studio
- Genre: Feature film soundtrack
- Length: 21:23
- Language: Hindi
- Label: T-Series
- Producer: Jackie Vanjari

Sanjay Leela Bhansali chronology
Padmaavat (2018)	Malaal (2019)	Gangubai Kathiawadi (2022)
External audio
- Official Audio Jukebox on YouTube

The music of the film is composed by Sanjay Leela Bhansali, Shreyas Puranik and Shail Hada and lyrics written by Prashant Ingole, Vimal Kashyap and A. M. Turaz.

Track listing
No.	Title	Lyrics	Singer(s)	Length
1.	"Aila Re"	Prashant Ingole	Vishal Dadlani; Rap: Shreyas Puranik	3:11
2.	"Udhal Ho"	Prashant Ingole	Adarsh Shinde	3:34
3.	"Nad Khula" (Music by Shreyas Puranik)	Prashant Ingole	Shreyas Puranik	3:18
4.	"Aai Shappath"	Prashant Ingole	Rutvik Talashilkar	2:39
5.	"Kathai Kathai"	A. M. Turaz, Prashant Ingole	Shreya Ghoshal	3:01
6.	"Zara Suno" (Music by Shail Hada)	Vimal Kashyap	Rutvik Talashilkar, Aanandi Joshi	2:46
7.	"Ek Malaal"	Prashant Ingole	Shail Hada	2:54
Total length:				21:23

== Release ==
The film was scheduled to release on 28 June 2019, but was released theatrically on 5 July 2019.

== Reception ==
=== Critical response ===
Sreeparna Sengupta of The Times of India gave the film 3.5/5 stars, praising the performance of debutants Meezaan and Sharmin Segal and their onscreen chemistry, termed it as a 'simmering love story' with 'romantic and intense moments'. Sengupta feels the background music 'addictive' and cinematography 'top notch'. Concluding, Sengupta wrote, "Malaal is reminiscent of sweet romances when handwritten notes were actually a thing and it’s tender moments like these that sets the film apart. This one is for those who want to soak themselves into a full-blown love story." Priyanka Sinha Jha of News18, terms the debut duo of Meezaan and Sharmin Segal 'charming in parts', but 'rough around the edges' and rates the film with 2.5/5 stars. Agreeing with Sengupta, she praises the music but feels that Mangesh Hadawale’s direction 'lacks the finesse'. Concluding, she writes, "Malaal lacks the pathos it needed to soar to greater heights than the Tamil original (which is the source material for the film) to make Hindi cinema audiences sit up and take notice." Writing for NDTV, Saibal Chatterjee praised cinematographer Ragul Dharuman for 'depth of view', production designer Akriti Piplani for carving out spaces, Meezaan for screen presence and Sharmin Segal for meeting the 'demands of the character'. He opined that the debut duo cannot be 'just dismissed as two more beneficiaries of a nepotistic movie industry'. He felt that the retro soundscape put the life in the film whenever it languished, and it would have been better if the film had the courage to stress upon the 'power of love to surmount divisive forces'. He concluded the review as, "[Malaal] abandons the topical concern and settles for a construct that drifts towards a tame, sanitized finish." He rated it with 2.5/5 stars. Devesh Sharma reviewing for Filmfare rates the film with 3.5/5 stars. He praises Meezaan and Sharmin and opines that the industry has found two performers in them. Agreeing with Sengupta, he feels that it is a simmering love story, not like the stories commonly seen these days. He recommends, "Watch the film for its old-fashioned love story and realistic performances..."

=== Box office ===
Malaal had a total worldwide revenue of ₹25.0 million. It was declared to be a “disaster” by India’s box office.

== Home media ==
The film became available as VOD on Netflix in September 2019.
