= Atithi Bhooto Bhava =

2022 film directed by Hardik Gajjar

- Directed by: Hardik Gajjar
- Written by: Aniket Wakchaure
- Screenplay by: Pradeep Srivastava; Shreyes Anil Lowlekar
- Produced by: Jayantilal Gada; Hardik Gajjar; Dhaval Jayantilal Gada; Akshay Jayantilal Gada; Parth Gajjar
- Starring: Pratik Gandhi; Jackie Shroff; Sharmin Segal
- Cinematography: Madhu Vannier
- Edited by: Kanu Prajapati; Satyanarayan Sharma
- Music by: Prasad S
- Distributed by: ZEE5
- Release date: 23 September 2022
- Running time: 114 minutes
- Country: India
- Language: Hindi

Atithi Bhooto Bhava is an Indian Hindi-language horror comedy film written by Aniket Wakchaure and directed by Hardik Gajjar. It features Jackie Shroff, Pratik Gandhi and Sharmin Segal in lead roles. The film went on floors in January 2021. It was released on ZEE5 on September 23, 2022.

== Plot ==
Srikant's life turns upside down when he bumps into a middle-aged ghost who claims to be his grandson from his previous birth. Things take an even more comical turn when the ghost seeks Srikant's help to meet his long-lost love. He decides to help the ghost and is supported by his girlfriend Netra.

== Cast ==
- Jackie Shroff as Makhan Singh
  - Prabhjyot Singh as Young Maakhan
- Pratik Gandhi as Srikant Shirodkar
- Sharmin Segal as Netra Banerjee
- Divinaa Thackur as Sucharita Singh
- Sunil Shakya as Radhey
- Simran Sharma as Young Manju

== Soundtrack ==
Atithi Bhooto Bhava

Soundtrack album by Prasad S
- Released: September 22, 2022
- Genre: Feature film soundtrack
- Length: 19:59
- Language: Hindi
- Label: Zee Music Company
External audio
- Official Audio Jukebox on YouTube

The music of the film is composed by Prasad S.

No.	Title	Lyrics	Singer(s)	Length
1.	"Gulmohar"	Tanveer Javed	Shahid Mallya	3:59
2.	"Raat Kawari Hai"	Mayur Puri	Benny Dayal	3:26
3.	"Udd Raha Hai Dil"	Shakeel Azmi	Raghav Chaitanya, Aditi Singh Sharma	3:29
4.	"Paakhi Hua Re"	Priyanka R Bala	Arijit Singh	5:40
5.	"Iss Dil Mein"	Kunaal Verma, Priyanka R Bala	Ankit Tiwari	3:29
Total length:				19:59

== Reception ==
Filmfare rated the film 3 out of 5 stars and wrote "The film leans heavily on Jackie Shroff's charm. He's totally likeable as a friendly ghost". Abhishek Srivastava of Times of India also rated the film 3 out of 5 stars. Deepa Gahlot writing for Rediff.com rated the film 2 out of 5 stars and wrote "The film coasts along on Jackie Shroff's sparkling screen presence." Nandini Ramnath of Scroll.in commented, "Jackie Shroff, patron saint of fun times, is a good choice as the ghost whose heartache hasn’t reached the twinkle in his eyes."
