= Yaariyan (2014 film) =

2014 Indian film by Divya Khosla Kumar

- Theatrical release poster
- Directed by: Divya Khosla Kumar
- Written by: Sanjeev Dutta
- Produced by: Bhushan Kumar; Krishan Kumar
- Starring: Himansh Kohli; Rakul Preet Singh; Evelyn Sharma; Nicole Faria
- Cinematography: Sameer Arya
- Edited by: Aarif Sheikh
- Music by: Pritam; Anupam Amod; Mithoon; Arko; Yo Yo Honey Singh
- Production company: T-Series
- Distributed by: AA Films
- Release date: 10 January 2014
- Running time: 145 minutes
- Country: India
- Language: Hindi
- Budget: ₹100 million
- Box office: ₹550 million

Yaariyan (transl. Friendships) is a 2014 Indian Hindi-language romantic comedy drama film directed by Divya Khosla Kumar (in her Hindi directorial debut), and stars Himansh Kohli, Rakul Preet Singh (in her Hindi debut), Nicole Faria (in her film debut) and Evelyn Sharma. The film was produced by Bhushan Kumar and Krishan Kumar under the banner of T-Series Super Cassettes Industries.

The response to the promotional material on YouTube led the distributor to release the film two weeks earlier than initially planned. The film was released on 10 January 2014 with a 1200-screen release in India. The film received negative reviews from critics but was a box office success, grossing ₹550 million against its ₹100 million budget.

== Plot ==
Living on a university campus in Gangtok, Sikkim, Lakshya is the son of a martyred army officer who does not appreciate his father's sacrifice for the nation. Lakshya, Jiya – a college bombshell, Saloni – a geek, Pardy – a drummer, and Neil – a biker, are five close friends who are exploring the best moments of their lives in college, experiencing different relationships as they lead an aimless life. Lakshya and his girlfriend, Jenny, try to kiss in the library but get interrupted by Pardy and caught by the principal. Soon, at a function Lakshya and Jenny again try to get intimate with Jiya taking on her role for the function but things go awry when Jiya gets stripped from her saree in her undergarments in front of the audience and Lakshya and Jenny hang from a rope above. Jenny then dumps Lakshya. They come across a challenge when an Australian businessman buys the college campus and plans to build a casino instead but is ready to lease out the land to the college for 100 years only if they are able to defeat a team of Australian students in a five-round competition. The principal chooses the five students to take part in the challenge.

For the first three rounds they are sent to Australia where Lakshya meets his best friend and cousin Debu. He also meets Jannet, an Australian student, who falls in love with him, and when the teams spend time together at the beach, Lakshya and Jannet make out. During the first round of a rock concert, the Australian band steals Lakshya and his band's song, and in protest they brutally beat Debu. While Debu is rushed to the hospital, Lakshya and the band perform a Hindi song, eventually losing the first round. Saloni then wins the second round which is a chess competition. Unable to recover from his injuries, Debu succumbs in the hospital. Disturbed by his death, Saloni and Neil lose the third round of the bike race, giving Australia a 2–1 lead.

The competition is then shifted to India with the final two rounds to go. Lakshya discovers that Neil was the traitor who gave their song to the Australian band and intentionally lost the bike race to obtain an Australian visa as promised by the Australian team member. Meanwhile practicing for the next three rounds, Lakshya falls in love with Saloni after helping her get back at Jenny for bullying Saloni. Saloni wants to tell everyone that they are in love, however, Lakshya refuses as he doesn’t want Jannet to figure out their relationship. On the day of Holi, Lakshya and Jannet make out again. However, they get interrupted as Neil is recording them. After Holi, Jannet express her love for Lakshya, but, Lakshya realizes he loves Saloni who figures out about him and Jannet. Despite Lakshya’s attempts of making her forgive him, Saloni tries to get back at him. As Saloni tries to kiss another man in public, Lakshya comes in, kisses Saloni and expresses his love in front of everybody.

Lakshya figures out about Neil helping the Australians as he gave them the song that they were supposed to sing. Neil plans to lose the bike race but Lakshya makes him think that the Australians are double crossing him. Neil realizes his fault and decides to win the race, but fatefully falls from stairs breaking his leg. Lakshya takes his place and beats Australia in round four, leading to a tie between both teams. In the final round of rock climbing, a team member of both teams has to collect his respective country's flag from the hilltop and race back to the college in order to win the competition. After crossing all the hurdles, Lakshya manages to win the race and the college celebrates their victory. The story ends with Lakshya and Saloni, Jiya and Pardy getting together while Neil repents his deeds. Lakshya and Jannet decide to be just friends. Lakshya’s mom gives him his dad’s sunglasses. Lakshya realizes the importance of sacrifice for the world. At the end, Lakshya and Saloni kiss but Lakshya is again distracted as his sight goes to another girl standing there.

== Cast ==
- Himansh Kohli as Lakshya
- Rakul Preet Singh as Saloni, Lakshya’s girlfriend
- Serah Singh as Jenny, Lakshya ex-girlfriend
- Nicole Faria as Jiya
- Shreyas Pardiwalla as Pardy
- Dev Sharma as Neil
- Jatin Suri as Debu
- Yashpal Sharma as Principal
- Vikas Verma as Mike
- Evelyn Sharma as Jannet, Lakshya ex-love interest
- Sayali Bhagat as Nikki Mahajan
- Mrunal Thakur as Kylie
- Gabriella Giardina as Elizabeth
- Deepti Naval as Girls' hostel warden and Debu's mother
- Nyra Banerjee as Priety
- Bhagyashri Borse as Raajlaxmi
- Smita Jaykar as Lakshya's mother
- Gulshan Grover as College Principal
- Hemant Pandey as Saloni's father
- Manish Kumar as Jenny's boyfriend
- Yo Yo Honey Singh as Batbelly

== Production ==
=== Development ===
Early 2011, Bhushan Kumar announced making a film in college romance genre and that Divya Khosla Kumar would be the director. And first choice for the female leads was offered to Wamiqa Gabbi, Kainaat Arora and Tisca Chopra with the title Salaamat Rahe Dostana Hamara..

Soon, an announcement was released that the cast of the film will include newcomers Himansh Kohli Rakul Preet Singh Nicole Faria and Evelyn Sharma as well as Gulshan Grover and Deepti Naval.

The title of the movie was registered with Saif Ali Khan. The production budget of film is ₹110 million (US$1.2 million).

=== Filming ===
The shoot began in Mumbai followed by shoots in Sikkim and Darjeeling. In Darjeeling, the movie was shot in St Joseph's School, Darjeeling. The film was also partially shot in Cape Town. Song Sunny Sunny was shot in the Bo-Kaap area of Cape Town.

== Soundtrack ==
The soundtrack for the film was composed by Pritam. There is also a special number by Honey Singh titled "Sunny Sunny". Mithoon rendered tracks for this film as well. Arko also composed a track. Audio album of the movie was released on 3 December 2013 through T-Series.

== Critical reception ==
The film received generally negative reviews. Saibal Chatterjee for NDTV Movies gave the film 1 star out of 5, stating that Yaariyan "makes no sense at all". Paloma Sharma for Rediff gave the film 0.5 out of 5 stars and wrote: "Yaariyan may be targeted at a young audience but every single teenager who chooses to watch it will be insulting their own intelligence". Madhureeta Mukherjee from Times of India gave the film 2 stars out of 5. She stated that "Yaariyan is nothing to gush about, but the teenies can watch this one for a lark...and some yo-yo beats!".

Taran Adarsh for Bollywood Hungama gave the film 4 stars out of 5 and stated that Yaariyan is "A treat for youngsters and young at heart". "On the whole, Yaariyan has a gripping second half, smash hit musical score and the youthful romance that should lure and entice its target audience.". Tushar Joshi for DNA India praised the music of the film, and gave the film 2 stars out of 5 stating that the film is "strictly for those who want to enjoy the songs on the big screen".

== Box office ==
=== India ===
Yaariyan had a good first weekend of around Rs 150 million nett Yaariyan grossed around Rs 25.0 million nett on first Monday taking its four-day total to 190 million nett. Yaariyan had the same figure as Monday as it collected 25.0 million nett taking its five-day total to Rs 215.0 million nett Yaariyan collected around 27.5 million nett in second weekend. Made on a budget of 100 million. It collected 420 million.

=== Overseas ===
Yaariyan was screened in the UAE and had a limited release.

== Sequel ==
A stand alone sequel, titled Yaariyan 2 and released on 20 October 2023 under Radhika Rao and Vinay Sapru's direction, is a coming-of-age comedy drama featuring Divya Khosla Kumar, Yash Dasgupta, Meezaan Jafri, Pearl Puri, Anaswara Rajan, Warina Hussain and Priya Prakash Varrier.
