= Lucky: No Time for Love =

2005 Indian film by Radhika Rao and Vinay Sapru

- Poster
- Directed by: Radhika Rao; Vinay Sapru
- Written by: Radhika Rao; Milap Zaveri
- Produced by: Sohail Khan; Bhushan Kumar; Krishnan Kumar
- Starring: Salman Khan; Sneha Ullal
- Cinematography: Sudeep Chatterjee
- Edited by: Sanjay Sankla
- Music by: Songs: Adnan Sami; Background Score: Monty Sharma
- Production companies: Sohail Khan Productions; T-Series Films
- Release date: 8 April 2005
- Running time: 132 minutes
- Country: India
- Language: Hindi
- Budget: ₹14 crore
- Box office: ₹27.81 crore

Lucky: No Time For Love, shortly known as Lucky is a 2005 Indian Hindi-language romantic drama film directed by Radhika Rao and Vijay Sapru. It depicts the story of two lovers in war-torn Russia. The film stars Salman Khan and Sneha Ullal.

== Plot ==
Lucky Negi is the daughter of Mr. Negi who works for Mr. Sekhri, the Indian Ambassador to Russia who has a son named Aditya. Lucky is a quiet, yet studious girl and lives with her parents as well as younger sister.

One day, while going to school, Lucky's bicycle tire goes flat and she ends up being the victim of an attempted rape by a young Russian. She manages to escape and hides in a parked car while the rapist is chased away by the car's owner, Aditya. Unaware of his "cargo", Aditya drives the car to meet his father until he is stopped at a check-post. That's when he discovers Lucky sitting in the back seat. During the checking, a terrorist attack occurs and utter chaos ensues. Aditya and Lucky manage to escape and hide in an isolated graveyard. Meanwhile, Sekhri and Negi recruit a private investigator, retired Colonel Pindi Das Kapoor, to locate their children. Just as Colonel Kapoor finds the graveyard, Aditya is forced to leave with Lucky when she accidentally drinks water poisoned by the terrorists. Aditya then manages to persuade a local doctor to take him and Lucky in, where she receives treatment. When the two eventually leave the doctor under pressing circumstances, a series of events ensues as they struggle to return to their families. Aditya and Lucky soon fall in love and are finally found by the Colonel, upon which they reunite with their families and get ready to fly back to India. Upon reaching the airport, the Colonel promises to return Aditya's car to him by ship, while Aditya and Lucky bid farewell to Russia and the Colonel.

== Cast ==
- Salman Khan as Aditya Sekhri "Adi"
- Sneha Ullal as Lucky Negi
- Mithun Chakraborty as Retired Colonel Pindidas Kapoor
- Kader Khan as Doctor
- Navni Parihar as Anjali Negi
- Ravi Baswani as Vishal Negi
- Vikram Gokhale as Ambassador Sekhri
- Meher Vij as Padma
- Mumaith Khan as Sunayana

== Soundtrack ==
Lucky: No Time for Love

Soundtrack album by Adnan Sami
- Released: 4 February 2005
- Genre: Feature film soundtrack
- Length: 33:43
- Label: T-Series

Adnan Sami chronology
Sargam (1995)	Lucky: No Time for Love (2005)	Dhamaal (2007)

The film's music is composed by Adnan Sami with lyrics written by Sameer. According to the Indian trade website Box Office India, with around 18,00,000 units sold, this film's soundtrack album was one of the top 5 highest selling Bollywood soundtrack of the year. Its soundtrack is one of the highest sellers of 2005 in India.

Track listing
No.	Title	Singer(s)	Length
1.	"Jaan Meri Ja Rahi Sanam"	Anuradha Paudwal & Udit Narayan	05:44
2.	"Sun Zara"	Sonu Nigam	06:06
3.	"Lucky Lips"	Asha Bhosle	05:12
4.	"Chori Chori"	Alka Yagnik & Sonu Nigam	05:24
5.	"Shayad Yahi To Pyar Hai"	Lata Mangeshkar & Adnan Sami	06:27
6.	"Lucky Lips (Bolshoi Mix)"	Asha Bhosle	03:15
7.	"Hum Deewane (Not in film)"	Anuradha Paudwal & Sonu Nigam	05:04
8.	"Sun Zara (The Lubov Mix)"	Adnan Sami	03:42
9.	"Chori Chori (Remix)"	Sonu Nigam & Alka Yagnik	05:15
Total length:			47:46

== Release and reception ==
The film was released on 8 April 2005. The film grossed ₹27.81 crore against a ₹14 crore production budget. Rediff.com called the box office performance of the film "Above average", writing, "Salman Khan's Lucky: No Time For Love saw one of the best openings this year -- almost 100 percent collections in the initial days. The film is well on its way to becoming a sizeble hit despite the cricket season, which seems to have become a nightmare for the Bollywood box-office."

Anupama Chopra of India Today wrote "There are languorously lovely shots of the snowy wasteland, St Petersburg and Russian religious iconography. Adnan Sami's compositions are refreshingly melodious. The leads work nicely - Salman Khan's irreverent charm helps camouflage his cradle-snatching. Unfortunately, none of this can salvage the second half, in which the passion and plot seem to peter out. The lovers spend most of their time battling bullets, nasty rebels and the unrelenting winter." Manish Gajjar of BBC.com wrote, "Music by Adnan Sami forms the highlight of the movie. Songs like Jaan Meri Ja Rahi Sanam, Sun Zara, Lucky Lips, Shayad Yehi To Pyaar Hai and Chori Chori are all well worth listening to. Praise also goes to Sudeep Chatterjee for his award winning cinematography of Russia. So for the above positive reasons, Lucky is a film well worth seeing." Raja Sen of Rediff.com wrote, "The second half of the film is, for the most part, a letdown, as our tragically trapped couple plod through all the predictable Hindi film pitfalls, with the script suddenly dragging, scarred by great dollops of melodrama."
