= Divya Khosla Kumar =

Indian model, actress, and filmmaker

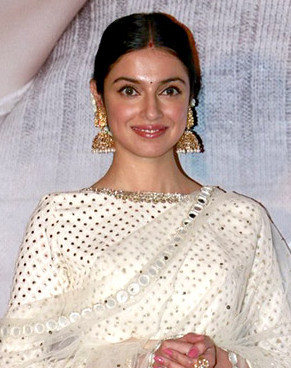
- Kumar in 2017
- Born: Delhi, India
- Occupations: Director; Producer; Actress
- Years active: 2000–present
- Title: Divya Khosla Kumar's Profile
- Spouse: Bhushan Kumar (m. 2005)
- Children: 1
- Family: Kumar family

Divya Khosla Kumar (née Khosla) is an Indian model, actress, producer, and director who mainly works in Hindi cinema. She has directed two films, the romantic comedy Yaariyan (2014) and the romantic drama Sanam Re (2016), and has produced Hindi films and music videos.

Khosla started her career as a model and appeared in various music videos notably "Zid Na Karo Ye Dil Ka Mamla Hai" by Roop Johri and Kunal Ganjawala and Falguni Pathak's "Aiyyo Rama". She made her acting debut with the Telugu film Love Today and her Hindi cinema debut with the film Ab Tumhare Hawale Watan Saathiyo (both 2004) before taking a hiatus from acting to focus on direction. On completion of a course in cinematography and editing, she directed several music videos before her directorial debut Yaariyan (2014) followed by Sanam Re (2016).

Khosla returned to acting in 2017 through the short film Bulbul, and since 2021, has starred in the action thriller Satyameva Jayate 2, the romantic drama Yaariyan 2 (2023), the action thriller Savi (2024), and this year's dark-comedy thriller Ek Chatur Naar (2025).

She is married to Bhushan Kumar, the chairman and managing director of T-Series.

== Career ==
=== Debut, hiatus and work as director (2003–2016) ===
Khosla started her career as a model and later appeared in a number of music videos. In 2003, she starred in the music video "Kabhi Yaadon Mein Aaun", sung by Abhijeet Bhattacharya. She also appeared with Salman Khan in the music video "Honey Honey", sung by Roop Johri and Kunal Ganjawala. Her acting debut was in the 2004 Telugu film Love Today, where she starred opposite Uday Kiran. She also appeared in a music video "Aiyyo Rama" sung by Falguni Pathak. In the same year, she made her Hindi cinema debut with the film Ab Tumhare Hawale Watan Saathiyo, in which she portrayed Shweta, the wife of Major Rajeev Singh played by Akshay Kumar. Patcy N of Rediff noted, "Divya Khosla doesn't have much to do and acts well in a few sequences."

She then took a long break from acting and focused on directing. After completing a course in cinematography and editing, Khosla directed music videos for Agam Kumar Nigam, Jermaine Jackson, Tulsi Kumar, and a few ad films. After directing 20 music videos, Khosla did her first directorial venture Yaariyan in 2014 starring Himansh Kohl and Rakul Preet Singh. The film received negative reviews from critics but was a box office success. Divya also choreographed five songs in the film, including "Baarish", "Meri Maa", "Love Me Thoda Aur", "Allah Wariya", and "Zor Lagake".

Her second directorial project was the romantic drama Sanam Re in 2016 . The film starred Pulkit Samrat, Yami Gautam, and Urvashi Rautela. The film began production in December 2014 at Barog station in Shimla and was shot in Mumbai, Chandigarh, Shimla, Kalpa, Ladakh, Tanakpur, and various locations in Canada.

=== Return to acting (2017–present) ===
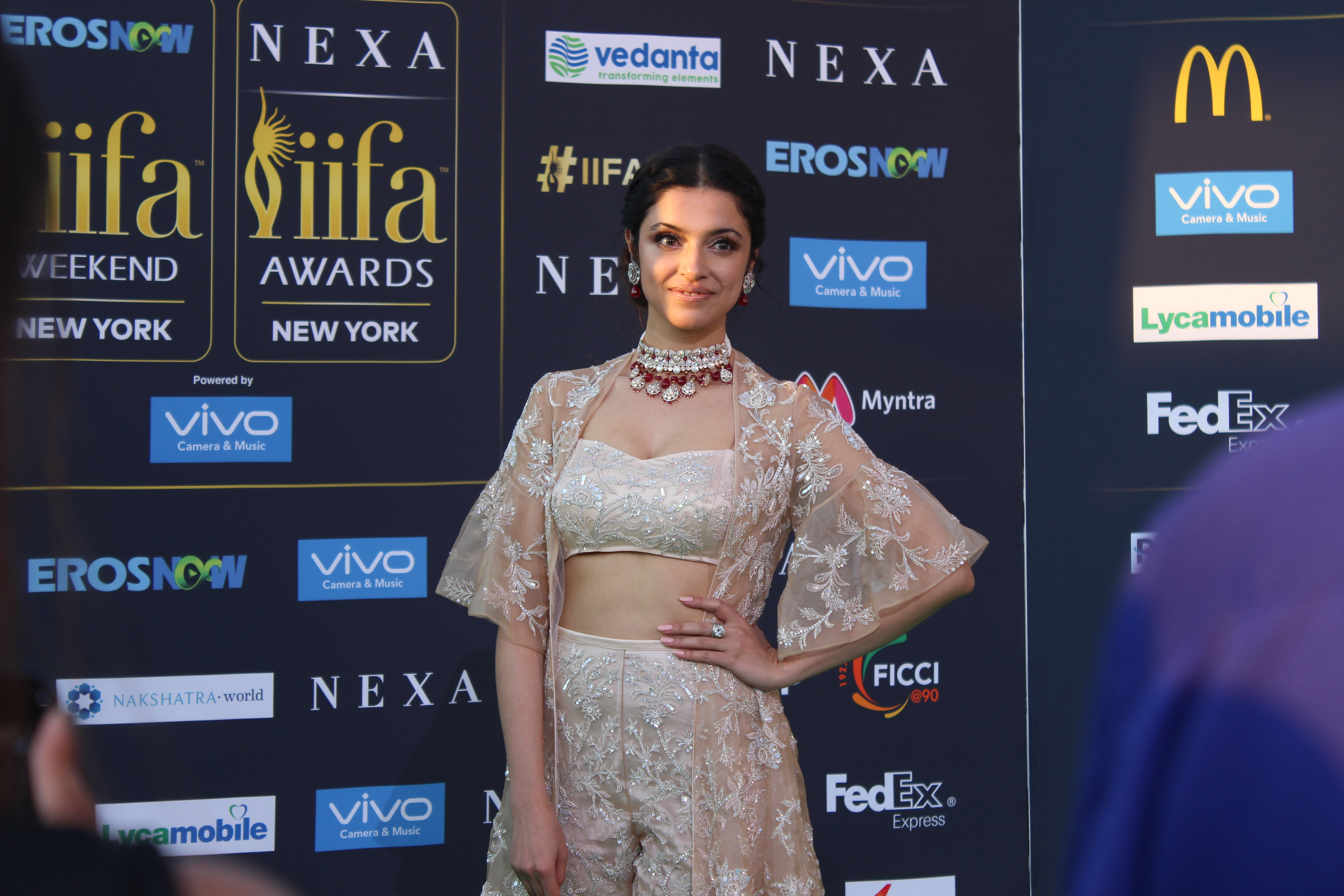
Kumar at IIFA 2017

Khosla returned to acting in 2017 with the short film Bulbul also acting as the producer. In 2021, she starred opposite John Abraham in Satyameva Jayate 2. This film was the sequel to John's 2018 film of the same name. The film received negative reviews; however, the Times of India noted, "Divya Khosla is pleasant and has a fairly prominent part to play in this otherwise male-dominated movie."

In 2019, Khosla appeared in the video song "Yaad Piya Ki Aane Lagi" by Neha Kakkar, a remix of a song with the same name from the 1999 film Pyaar Koi Khel Nahin .The new generation crosses 500 million views on YouTube In 2020, Divya featured in the video song "Teri Aankhon Mein" with Pearl V. Puri has also crossed 500M Views on Youtube, sung by Darshan Raval and Neha Kakkar.

In 2023, Khosla starred as Laadli Chibber Singh Katyal in Radhika Rao's romantic dramaYaariyan 2. A remake of the Malayalam film Bangalore Days (2014) and a sequel to her directorial debut Yaariyan, her character Laadli was seen as a recovering thalassemia patient living with her mother in Shimla, where her mother wants her to marry into a good family, but Laadli aspires to win a beauty pageant and build a career. During the trailer launch of the film, Khosla revealed that the role is based on her, and recalled the memories of her when the director cast her after seeing her audition in Delhi when she was just 14. The film received mixed reviews. A critic from Bollywood Hungama praised Khosla's performance. Vinamra Mathur from Firstpost wrote "Yaariyan 2 can be best described as a silly sequel to Yaariyan. This isn't just a sequel but a remake of a Malayalam film, which was released in the same year as the first Yaariyan, 2014 to be precise. There's a lot happening in the first paragraph itself."

Her 2004 film action thriller Savi, directed by Abhinay Deo, focuses on the story of a woman who fights to save her family and others by standing up against the government and administration, it also starred Anil Kapoor and Harshvardhan Rane. The film was released to positive reviews from critics, and was a commercial success at the box office. Titas Chowdhury of News18 wrote that "the film marks a revelation of sorts as it sees Divya hitting all the emotional notes right, a feat we haven't had the opportunity to witness in the past. She skillfully embodies a complex character, showcasing palpable depth in her portrayal of Savi's vulnerability and strength, creating a unique blend of fragility and fearlessness." Abhishek Srivastava of Times of India stated "Divya Khossla takes on the challenging role of Savi, and her hard work is evident in her performance. She remains the focal point throughout the film."

She is set to appear in the Telugu film Hero Heeroine, directed by Suresh Krissna.

== Personal life ==
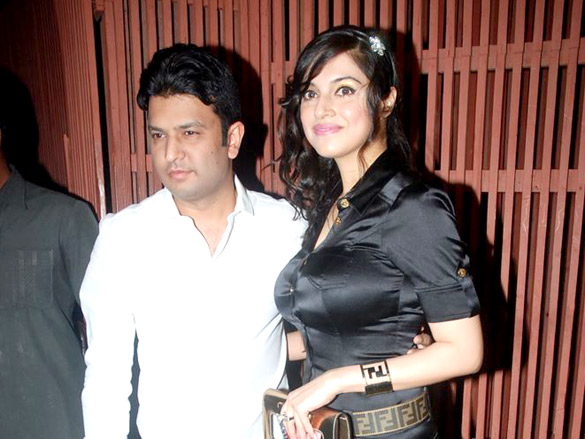
Khosla with husband Bhushan Kumar

Khosla was born in Delhi. She married Bhushan Kumar on 13 February 2005 at the Maa Vaishno Devi shrine in Katra. The couple has a son born in October 2011.

== Filmography ==
Key
†	Denotes films that have not yet been released

=== As an actress ===
Year	Film	Role	Notes	Ref.
2004	Love Today	Parvatha Vardhini	Telugu film	
2004	Ab Tumhare Hawale Watan Saathiyo	Shweta Bhansali Singh		
2016	Sanam Re	Herself	Special appearance in the songs "Akkad Bakkad" and "Humne Pee Rakkhi Hain"	
2017	Bulbul	Bulbul	Short film	
2021	Satyameva Jayate 2	MLA Vidya Maurya Azad		
2023	Yaariyan 2	Laadli Chibber		
2024	Savi	Savi Sachdeva		
2025	Ek Chatur Naar	Mamta Mishra		
2025	Jatadhara	Sitara	Telugu-Hindi bilingual film	
2026	Khosla Ka Ghosla 2		Hindi film	
TBA	Hero Heeroine †	TBA	Telugu-Hindi bilingual film; Filming	

=== As director ===
Year	Film	Notes	Ref
2014	Yaariyan	Directorial debut	
2016	Sanam Re		

=== As producer ===
Year	Film	Notes	Ref.
2015	Roy		
2017	Bulbul		
2019	Khandaani Shafakhana		
2019	Batla House		
2019	Marjaavaan		
2020	Street Dancer 3D		
2020	Ludo	Netflix release	
2020	Indoo Ki Jawani		
2020	Shubh Mangal Zyada Saavdhan		
2021	Sardar Ka Grandson	Netflix release	
2023	Yaariyan 2		

== Awards and nominations ==
Year	Award	Category	Film	Result	Ref.
2005	Bollywood Movie Award	Best Female Debut	Ab Tumhare Hawale Watan Sathiyo	Nominated	
2021	Filmfare Awards	Best Film (as producer)	Ludo	Nominated	
2022	Iconic Gold Awards	Iconic Best Actress of the Year - Popular Choice	Satyameva Jayate 2	Won	
