= Meezaan Jafri =

Indian actor (born 1995)

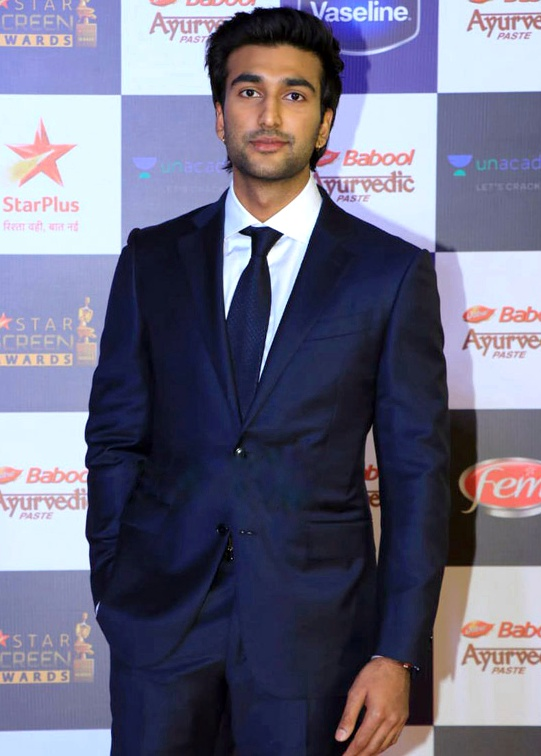
- Jafri in 2019
- Pronunciation: [miːzɑːn d͡ʒɑːfɾiː]
- Born: Syed Meezaan Ahmed Jaffrey; 9 March 1995 (age 31); Mumbai, Maharashtra, India
- Occupations: Actor; assistant director
- Years active: 2019–present
- Known for: Hungama 2 Yaariyan 2
- Father: Jaaved Jaaferi
- Relatives: Jagdeep (grandfather)

Meezaan Jafri (Note: Hindustani pronunciation: [miːzɑːn d͡ʒɑːfɾiː].) (Hindustani pronunciation: [miːzɑːn d͡ʒɑːfɾiː]; born Syed Meezaan Ahmed Jaffrey; 9 March 1995) is an Indian actor who works in Hindi films. The son of actor Jaaved Jaaferi and grandson of comedian Jagdeep, he made his acting debut in Malaal (2019), which earned him critical praise for his performance. Jafri has since starred in Hungama 2 (2021), Yaariyan 2 (2023), and De De Pyaar De 2 (2025).

== Early life ==
Jafri was born on 9 March 1995 to actor Jaaved Jaaferi and his wife Habiba Jaafery. He is the grandson of veteran actor Jagdeep. He studied business at the Franklin & Marshall College in Pennsylvania, but then decided to study film direction and editing at the School of Visual Arts in New York.

== Career ==
Jafri assisted Sanjay Leela Bhansali and was the body double for Ranveer Singh in Padmavat. He was also an assistant director on Bajirao Mastani and Gangubai Kathiawadi.

Jafri made his debut in Sanjay Leela Bhansali's romantic drama Malaal. He played a unemployed Marathi youth opposite Sharmin Segal. Priyanka Sinha Jha of News18 noted, "Jaaferi seems to be the complete package – he dances like a dream, can be intense and also has a bit of goofy in him." Saibal Chatterjee of NDTV stated, "Meezaan has considerable screen presence." He received Filmfare Award for Best Male Debut nomination for the film.

In 2021, Jafri played the lead in the comedy-drama Hungama 2 which released on Disney+ Hotstar. Bollywood Hungama noted, "Meezaan Jafri is strictly okay. The actor tries his best but in some scenes, his comic timing is not up to the mark."

In 2023, Jafari played a motocross racer opposite Anaswara Rajan in T-Series's Yaariyan 2. It emerged a commercial failure.

Jafri played a local Football player in the 2024 film, The Miranda Brothers, alongside Harshvardhan Rane. Dhaval Roy found his character a "nuanced" one, shining in key scenes.

== Filmography ==
Key
†	Denotes films that have not yet been released

=== Films ===
Year	Title	Role	Notes	Ref.
2015	Bajirao Mastani	—N/a	Assistant director	
2018	Padmaavat	—N/a	Assistant director	
2019	Malaal	Shiva Morey		
2021	Hungama 2	Akash Kapoor		
2022	Gangubai Kathiawadi	—N/a	Assistant director	
2023	Yaariyan 2	Shikhar Randhawa		
2024	The Miranda Brothers	Regalo Miranda		
2025	Nadaaniyan	Kunwar Rudra Pratap Singh	Cameo appearance	
2025	De De Pyaar De 2	Aditya		

=== Television ===
Year	Title	Role	Notes	Ref.
2024	The Tribe	Himself	Guest appearance	

== Awards and nominations ==
Year	Award	Category	Work	Result	Ref.
2020	65th Filmfare Awards	Best Male Debut	Malaal	Nominated	
2020	20th Zee Cine Awards	Best Male Debut	Malaal	Nominated	
