= Anupam Amod =

Indian playback singer

- Also known as: Bobby
- Born: Anupam; Jaipur, India
- Genre: playback singing
- Occupations: singer, composer
- Years active: 2000–present

Anupam Amod (Hindi: अनुपम अमोद) is an Indian playback singer. He was born in Jaipur and graduated from SPA Delhi.

== Playback singing ==
Anupam Amod released an album with Times Music titled Chandan Sa Badan which contained his song "Saude Bazi" from the 2010 movie Aakrosh composed by Pritam.

== Partial discography ==
Denotes films that have not yet been released

Year	Album	Composer	Song	Singer(s)	Notes
2010	Aakrosh	Pritam	Saude Bazi	Anupom Amod	
2010	Atithi Tum Kab Jaoge?	Pritam	Na Jaane Tum Kab Jaoge	Anupom Amod	
2011	Kucch Luv Jaisaa	Pritam	Thoda Sa Pyaar	Anupom Amod, Sunidhi Chauhan	
2011	Tell Me O Khuda	Pritam	Mile Na Tu	Anupom Amod, Sunidhi Chauhan	
2011	Tell Me O Khuda	Pritam	Love You Dad	Anupom Amod, Aditi Banerjee	
2011	Always Kabhi Kabhi	Pritam	Antenna (Reloaded: SRK Mix)	KK, Anupom Amod, Apeksha Dandekar	
2012	Jannat 2	Pritam	Rab Ka Shukrana (Reprise)	Anupom Amod	
2012	Rush	Pritam	Mumkin Nahin	Anupom Amod, Tulsi Kumar	
2012	Cocktail	Pritam	Luttna (Saif Ul Malook)	Masuma Anwar, Sahir Ali Bagga, Anupom Amod	Remake
2012	Cocktail	Pritam	Luttna (Version 2)	Masuma Anwar, Sahir Ali Bagga, Anupom Amod	Remake
2013	R... Rajkumar	Pritam	Gandi Baat	Mika Singh, Kalpana Patowary	Lyrics by Anupom Amod
2013	R... Rajkumar	Pritam	Gandi Baat (Film Version)	Nakash Aziz, Ritu Pathak	Lyrics by Anupom Amod
2013	Murder 3	Anupom Amod, Pritam	Jaata Hai Tujh Tak	Nikhil D'Souza	
2013	Murder 3	Anupom Amod, Pritam	Jata Hai Tujh Tak (Film Version)	Nikhil D'Souza	
2013	Once Upon Ay Time in Mumbai Dobaara!	Anupom Amod	Bismillah	Akshay Kumar	
2013	Once Upon Ay Time in Mumbai Dobaara!	Anupom Amod	Tayyab Ali	Javed Ali	Remake
2014	Yaariyan	Anupom Amod	Meri Maa	KK	
2014	Yaariyan	Anupom Amod	Meri Maa (Reprise)	KK	
2014	Yaariyan	Anupom Amod	Meri Maa (Unplugged)	Anupom Amod	
2014	Raja Natwarlal	Yuvan Shankar Raja	Namak Paare	Mamta Sharma, Anupom Amod	
2015	I Love New Year	Anupom Amod	Gud Naal Ishq Mitha	Tochi Raina	Remake
2015	I Love New Year	Anupom Amod	Gud Naal Ishq Mitha (Remix)	Sukhwinder Singh	Remake
2015	Badmashiyaan	Bobby-Imran	Shaitaaniyan (Encore)	Anupom Amod	
2016	Days of Tafree	Bobby-Imran	Parappaa	Anupom Amod	
2016	Days of Tafree	Bobby-Imran	Jeeley Yeh Lamhe	Amit Mishra, Anupom Amod	
2019	Commando 3	Mannan Shaah	Main Woh Raat Hoon	Ankit Tiwari, Anupom Amod	Chorus
2022	Bhool Bhulaiyaa 2	Pritam	Mere Dholna (Dad Version)	Anupom Amod	Remake
2023	Rocky Aur Rani Kii Prem Kahaani	Pritam	Abhi Na Jao Chod Kar (Version 1)	Anupom Amod, Shoma Baneerjee	Remake

== Awards and nominations ==
Year	Category	Song and Film	Result	Ref.
Mirchi Music Awards
2012	Upcoming Music Composer of The Year	"Tera Deedar Hua" from Jannat 2	Nominated	
2012	Upcoming Music Composer of The Year	"Tera Deedar Hua (From The Heart)" from Jannat 2	Nominated	
