= I Love New Year =

2015 Indian film by Radhika Rao & Vinay Sapru

I Love NY
- Theatrical release poster
- Directed by: Radhika Rao; Vinay Sapru
- Written by: Radhika Rao; Vinay Sapru
- Based on: The Irony of Fate by: Emil Braginsky; Eldar Ryazanov
- Produced by: Bhushan Kumar; Krishan Kumar
- Starring: Sunny Deol; Kangana Ranaut; Navin Chowdhry; Tannishtha Chatterjee; Prem Chopra; Kubra Sait
- Narrated by: Sunny Deol
- Cinematography: Sahil Kapoor
- Edited by: Deven Murdeshwar; Vinod Pathak
- Music by: Songs: Pritam; Score: Aadesh Shrivastava
- Production company: T-Series
- Distributed by: T-Series
- Release date: 10 July 2015
- Running time: 127 minutes
- Country: India
- Language: Hindi

I Love NY, also known as I Love New Year, is a 2015 Indian Hindi-language romantic comedy film directed by Radhika Rao and Vinay Sapru starring Sunny Deol and Kangana Ranaut. It was produced by Bhushan Kumar and Krishan Kumar under the banner of T-Series. After numerous delays, the film released on 10 July 2015.

== Plot ==
I Love NY (also known as I Love New Year) is a romantic comedy that unfolds over a single New Year's Eve. The plot centres on two strangers, Randhir Singh and Tikku Verma, who live in two different cities, Chicago and New York, respectively in the United States. On New Year's Eve, Randhir, a commitment-phobic Wall Street Investment Banker, gets extremely drunk after a party with his friends. In his inebriated state, he accidentally boards a flight to New York, thinking he is returning home to Chicago.

Upon arriving in New York, he takes a cab to what he believes is his apartment address. Due to an incredible coincidence, an identical apartment building with the same number and layout exists in New York, and even his house key works in the lock. He enters the apartment, gets into bed, and passes out.

The apartment actually belongs to Tikku, a beautiful musician who is a self-described member of the "unlucky club" and is about to get engaged to her high-handed and controlling boyfriend, Ishaan. When she returns home, she finds a stranger – Randhir – in her bed. A series of comical misunderstandings and arguments ensue, especially when Tikku's boyfriend arrives and assumes she is cheating on him.

As the night progresses, Randhir and Tikku are forced to spend time together, and through their bizarre circumstances, they begin to develop an unexpected connection. They share their life stories and personal struggles, finding comfort and understanding in each other's company. Their chance encounter challenges their existing perceptions about love and happiness, leading them to question their current relationships. By the end of the night, they realize they have madly fallen in love, and the "comedy of errors" on New Year's Eve becomes a life-changing event for them both.

== Cast ==
- Sunny Deol as Randhir Singh
- Kangana Ranaut as Tikku Verma
- Navin Chowdhry as Ishan
- Tannishtha Chatterjee as Riya
- Prem Chopra as Papa ji
- Kubra Sait as Vidya Saxena
- Reema Lagoo as Tikku's adoptive mother
- Maya Alagh as Tikku's neighbour
- Manoj Joshi
- Jiten Mukhi as Randhir's friend
- Virag Mishra as Romy
- Elona Gagani as Sarah
- Russell Geoffrey Banks as Mike
- Alex Nowrouz as Passenger

== Production ==
In 2011 directors Radhika Rao and Vinay Sapru announced their intent to begin work on I Love New Year. The film originally had the working title of Happy New Year, but the title was changed because Shah Rukh Khan was working at the same time on a film of that title. Actors Sunny Deol and Kangana Ranaut were cast in the lead roles; Ranaut said that she trained for over a month in order to learn the correct expressions and body language of a musician. Shooting commenced in summer 2011 at Filmalaya Studios in Mumbai, and some scenes were filmed in Bangkok and the final scenes in New York City.

== Music ==
The music for the film’s songs was composed by Pritam, along with Falak Shabir, Anupam Amod and DJ Phukan. The lyrics of the songs were penned by Sayeed Quadri and Mayur Puri, along with Falak Shabir. The background score of the movie was done by Aadesh Shrivastava.

The song "Judaai" was recreated by Falak Shabir from a song previously composed by himself in 2013 of the same name. The song "Aaja Meri Jaan" was recreated by DJ Phukan from a song composed by R. D. Burman in 1993.

I Love NY

Soundtrack album by Pritam, Falak Shabir, Anupam Amod and DJ Phukan
- Genre: Feature film soundtrack
- Length: 23:34
- Language: Hindi
- Label: T-Series

No.	Title	Lyrics	Music	Singer(s)	Length
1.	"Halki Halki"	Mayur Puri	Pritam	Shaan, Tulsi Kumar	5:02
2.	"Gud Naal Ishaq Mitha"	Traditional, Mayur Puri	Anupam Amod	Tochi Raina	3:27
3.	"Aaja Meri Jaan"	Mayur Puri	DJ Phukan	Mauli Dave	5:14
4.	"Aao Na"	Sayeed Quadri	Pritam	Sonu Nigam, Tulsi Kumar	5:20
5.	"Judaai"	Falak Shabir	Falak Shabir	Falak Shabir	4:31
6.	"Gud Naal Ishaq Mitha (Remix)"	Traditional, Mayur Puri	Anupom Amod	Sukhwinder Singh
Total length:					23:34

== Release ==
Originally supposed to release in 2011, the film was delayed several times. The film was released on 10 July 2015.

=== Critical reception ===
The film received generally negative reviews. Filmfare reviewer Rachit Gupta gave the film 3 out of 5 stars, criticising the film's "mish-mash of sentimentality, annoying characters and clichéd rom-com developments". Gupta also felt that the music was forgettable. Troy Ribeiro of NDTV gave the film 2 out of 5 stars, calling the plot "silly and far-fetched". Nishi Tiwari of Rediff.com wrote in a 1 out of 5 stars review that it was "criminally unremarkable", criticising the story.

=== Box office ===
The film collected ₹2.5 crore (US$260,000) nett in its entire theatrical run against the budget of ₹15 crore (US$1.6 million), and was unsuccessful at box office.
