= Radhika Rao =

Indian film director

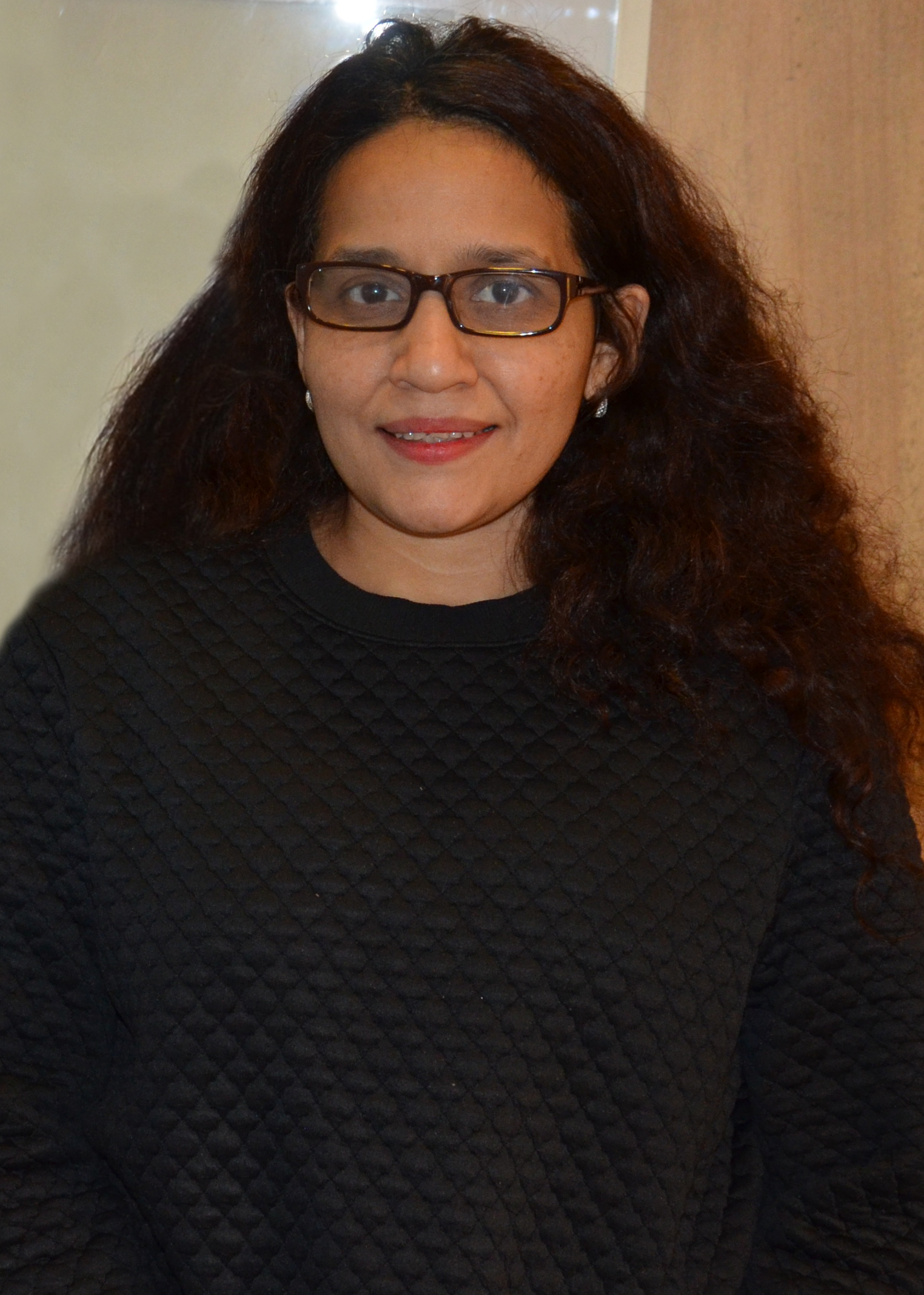
- Rao in 2018
- Occupations: Director; producer; screenwriter
- Years active: 1995–present

Radhika Rao is an Indian film director and screenwriter. She made her directorial debut with the film Lucky: No Time for Love (2005) with Vinay Sapru. Her other films include I Love NY (2015), Sanam Teri Kasam (2016), and Yaariyan 2 (2023). She runs a film production company Rao & Sapru with her business partner Vinay Sapru.

== Career ==
Rao earned a master's degree in mass communication and film studies from University of Hyderabad before venturing to make music videos with Vinay Sapru. The two directed "Kaanta Laga" and "Chadhti Jawani", which went on to become successful and also controversial in the early 2000s. The videos also earned numerous awards. The duo then made their debut as film directors with the 2005 film Lucky: No Time for Love. According to a review by Manish Gajjar for BBC Shropshire Bollywood, the film has slow parts and some untranslated Russian dialogue, but is "a film well worth seeing," including due to the performance by Salman Khan and music by Adnan Sami. In a review for India Today, Anupama Chopra describes the film as "ambitious," with "languorously lovely shots of the snowy wasteland, St Petersburg and Russian religious iconography", but pans the second part of the film and describes the cameo by Mithun Chakraborty as "annoying."

She next co-directed the 2015 film I Love NY with Sapru. A review by Roktim Rajpal in News18 described "The basic storyline is quite clichéd and has a ‘seen it before’ feel about it. As such, the film doesn’t really offer anything new or fresh". In India Times, Kunal Guha wrote "While it's good to notice that Sunny Deol's face hasn't aged a day beyond 35, it's upsetting to see that his performance hasn't either. Kangana is her chirpy, squeaky self”.

Rao then co-directed the 2016 film Sanam Teri Kasam with Sapru. A review by Shubhra Gupta in The Indian Express praised the acting by Mawra Hocane but overall panned the film. In The Hindu, Namrata Joshi writes that the film is "tailor-made" to fail the Bechdel test, and suggests "Go with a boxful of tissues if you cry easily at the movies."

Rao also co-directed the 2023 film Yaariyan 2 with Sapru. A review by Vinamra Mathur in Firstpost reflected on some of their past work together, comparing this film less favorably, but notes 25 million views of the trailer on YouTube. A review on Rediff by Deepa Gahlot describes the film as "a collection of music videos with a bare minimum plot to glue them together." A Bollywood Hungama review describes the direction by Rao and Sapru as "creative" and states they are "known for adding a lot even to their ordinary shots."

Rao and Sapru have directed more than 100 music videos over more than twenty years, including for Nusrat Fateh Ali Khan, Lata Mangeshkar, Asha Bhonsle, Arijit Singh, Neha Kakkar and Jubin Nautiyal. They have also worked with the company T-Series, owned by Bhushan Kumar, to direct music videos.

== Filmography ==
=== As screenwriter and director ===
Year	Film
2005	Lucky: No Time for Love
2015	I Love NY
2016	Sanam Teri Kasam
2023	Yaariyan 2

=== Song director ===
Year	Movie	Notes
2010	Dabangg	Song Director (Tere Mast Mast Do Nain)
2010	Dabangg	Song Director (Chori Kiya Re Jiya)
2012	Dabangg 2	Song Director (Dagabaaz Re)
2012	Dabangg 2	Song Director (Saason Ne)
2012	Ramaiya Vastavaiya	Song Director (Rang Jo Lagyo)
2014	Jai Ho	Song Director (Tere Naina Maar Hi Daalenge)
2014	Jai Ho	Song Director (Tumko To Ana Hi Tha)
2015	Prem Ratan Dhan Payo	Song Director (Premleela)
2019	Junglee	Song Director (Garje Gaj Raaj Humare)
2019	Dabangg 3	Song Director (Naina Lade Ke)
2019	Dabangg 3	Song Director (Farebi Naina)
