= Murad Khetani =

Indian film producer

- Born: 3 September 1973 (age 53); India
- Occupations: Producer; Former Businessman
- Years active: 2013-present
- Organization: Cine1 Studios
- Spouse: Anjum Murad (m. 1994)
- Children: 4

Murad Khetani (Hindi pronunciation: [m uu - r ah d k hh eh t ah n iy]; born 3 September 1973) is an Indian film producer and former businessman who primarily works in Hindi films. He started off his career as co-producer with the 2013 film Mickey Virus. He had his breakthrough with 2019 romantic drama film Kabir Singh, a remake of 2017 Telugu film Arjun Reddy. Khetani is a recipient of IIFA Award.

He had produced Bhool Bhulaiyaa 2 (2022), a standalone sequel to Bhool Bhulaiyaa (2007). His highest grossing release was Animal (2023).

== Early and personal life ==
Murad Khetani was born on 3 September 1973 in India and he is from a Ismaili Khoja family. He had married Anjum Murad on 18 December 1994. He has two sons, Kais Khetani and Rizwan Khetani.

== Business career ==
Khetani was a businessman for over 15 years. He had his experience with Broadcast Content space. He managed the waves of change in audiovisual content and song syndications business.

=== Production company ===
Khetani opened his own production company since 2014 when he first lead produced his film.

== Film career ==
=== 2013-2017: Debut as producer and box office bombs ===
Khetani had started off his career as a co-producer in 2013 Hindi comedy thriller Mickey Virus directed by Saurabh Verma. The film got positive reviews from critics, but despite the reviews it was a flop at box office. Taran Adarsh of Bollywood Hungama gave it 3 out of 5 stars, finding the thriller to be engaging for younger viewers. Mohar Basu of Koimoi gave it 2.5 out of 5 stars. Rajeev Masand of CNN-IBN gave it 2 out of 5 stars, criticizing the length and engagement. Faheem Ruhani of India Today gave it 3 out of 5 stars. Saibal Chatterjee of NDTV gave it 2.5 out of 5 stars. Tushar Joshi of DNA gave it 2.5 stars. Sanjukta sharma of Livemint did not give a rating, but found the film to have a weak plot and premise. Anupama Chopra gave it 2 stars. Zee News gave it 3.5 stars. Nikhil Arora of DesiMartini gave it 2 stars.

In 2014, Khetani made his debut as the lead producer with the comedy film The Shaukeens. The film received negative reviews and was average at box office. He produced a family comedy film Mubarakan which revolves two twin brothers who are marrying each other’s girlfriends due to family’s problems, their maternal uncle tries to help them out by marrying the right girls. The film got mixed reviews from critics and was a success at box office. Rohit Vats of Hindustan Times rated it 3/5 and felt that the lead actor, Arjun Kapoor, was overshadowed by Anil Kapoor: "It’s just that Anil Kapoor is a pro at it and steals all the limelight from him (Arjun).....You’ll be occasionally laughing, but probably won’t be leaving the theatre with a big smile on your face." Meena Lyer of Times of India rated the film 3/5 and concluded: "Anil is the scene-stealer with his half Brit-half Punjabi act lifting the film throughout. Arjun’s double-act allows for some smiles and the girls, Ileana, Athiya and Neha are easy on the eye, though they’re just decorative set-pieces." Manju Ramanan of Masala! gave the film 3.5/5 saying, "Loud characters, bright sets, songs and dances and slapstick humour dominate this Anees Bazmee film. But the instances do make you smile." Ahana Bhattacharya of Koimoi gave the film 3/5 saying, "The story is funny and the film has some really hilarious dialogues. However, Sardar jokes are a bit clichéd and Bollywood needs to get over it. I loved the way the film builds up the confusion but it tends to drag towards the climax. There are moments when you will feel it is patriarchal, racist and regressive. Also, the climax is a bit predictable.

=== 2019-2022: Breakthrough and success ===
He co-produced with Salman Khan marking his first collaboration was the romantic drama film Notebook. Notebook tells the story of a young retired army officer who joins his father's school as a teacher to save it from closure, and falls in love with the previous teacher after reading through her memorabilia left behind in the drawers. The film received mixed response from critics with praise. Despite the reviews, it was a failure at box office. On Rotten Tomatoes, the film had scored 22% based on nine reviews with an average rating of 4.2/10. Nandini Ramnath of Scroll.in writes, "Notebook has an unremarkable lead pair, an underwhelming dull love story in which the actors don't share the screen for nearly the entire duration of the narrative, some of the most ravishing views of Kashmir yet, a bunch of adorable children and a soundtrack with a few good tunes." Rachit Gupta of The Times of India rated the film with three stars out of five and says, "Notebook is an easy watch where you can appreciate the humour, drama and romance. But the film leaves you wanting for more. Perhaps with more creativity in writing, this young romantic saga could have achieved more." Writing for Daily News and Analysis Meena Iyer finds nothing wrong with the film but wished, "it hadn't been so antiseptic." She rates the film with three stars out of five. Jyoti Sharma Bawa of Hindustan Times rates the film with two and half stars out of five and praises the cinematographer Manoj Kumar Khatoi. She opines that the cinematographer has ensured that every frame is bursting with beauty and The visual portrayal would stay with the viewers long after they forget the sub-par love story. Charu Thakur of India Today gives two and half stars out of five and concludes the review as, "If you are looking for some old-world romance this weekend, Notebook is definitely a recommended watch for you."Bollywood Hungama while rating it with three stars out of five they feel that the film would appeal only to multiplex audience. They sum up review by saying, "On the whole, NOTEBOOK boasts of exemplary performances by the debutants and is beautifully shot while stressing on the importance of education."

His second release of 2019 was another romantic drama film Kabir Singh which is a remake of 2017 Telugu film Arjun Reddy. The film was directed by Sandeep Reddy Ranga who previously directed the original film. It starred Shahid Kapoor in the title role as a wealthy doctor who spirals into self-destruction when his girlfriend, Preeti, played by Kiara Advani, marries someone else. The film received mixed reviews from critics and a blockbuster success at box office. The film received mixed reviews, with criticism directed at it for allegedly glamorising misogyny and toxic masculinity. Ronak Kotecha of The Times of India rated the film 3.5 out of 5 stars, saying, "While Kabir Singh is a welcome change from stereotypical love stories, this kind of love affair needs some getting used to. Through his protagonist, Sandeep bets all his cards on his leading man, making sure you either love him or hate him, but you can't ignore him." Trade analyst and critic Taran Adarsh concurred with Kotecha on the film being an unconventional story and rated it three and half stars out of five. Declaring it "powerful", he praised Vanga's storytelling and Kapoor's performance. He felt that the film was a newfangled romantic tale. Anna M. M. Vetticad of Firstpost found the film "insidious" in its writing of the protagonist and wrote, "Kabir Singh and its Telugu forebear Arjun Reddy must rank among the most disturbing examples of the obsessive stalker hero being glamourised by Indian cinema." Rating the film 1 out of 5 stars, she further elaborated that "it is not the depiction of reality that is objectionable here, it is precisely because violent, destructive misogynists do exist and women for centuries have suffered at their hands that it is deeply troubling when a film portrays such a person as cool, funny, and, as Kapoor puts it, a man with 'a good heart' who 'loves purely' and 'wears his emotions on his sleeve'." Rajeev Masand of News 18 gave the film 2 out of 5 stars and said, "Kabir Singh is an unmistakably misogynistic film, but the sad part is that it's exactly these troubling portions that the filmmakers peddle as intense love." Priyanka Sinha Jha of News18, praising Kapoor's performance, Vanga's story and direction, rated the film with three and a half stars out of five. She found editing and soulful music of the film appealing. She felt that the film was a rare story of star-crossed lovers which moves the audience. In the end, She says, "Reddy despite a brooding despairing protagonist takes things many notches higher and makes it one helluva trippy ride." Devesh Sharma of Filmfare said, "At 172 minutes, the film is too long by modern standards. Thankfully, Vanga has gone for a non-linear mode of storytelling and going back and forth in the timeline does keep the viewer engrossed." Shubhra Gupta of The Indian Express giving the film one-and-a-half stars out of five, opined, "Kabir Singh (protagonist) is all flourish, mostly surface. You see him going through the motions, but you never really feel for him. And that, right there, is the problem: not enough pay off for three hours of pain." Raja Sen of Hindustan Times, agreeing with Gupta, gave one-and-a-half stars out of five and felt that it was the most misogynistic Indian film that had come in a long time. He praised the cinematography of Santhana Krishnan Ravichandran but criticised the other aspects of the film. He said, "Kabir Singh actually applauds its pathetic protagonist, and ends up an obnoxious celebration of toxic masculinity." Kunal Guha of Mumbai Mirror rated the film two-and-a-half stars out of five, feeling that trimming the script by forty minutes would have helped. Sandipan Sharma, writing for The Federal, praised and defended the film, saying, "filmmakers should have the right to explore the mind of a flawed person." He slammed critics for accusing the film of "glorifying misogyny, portraying toxic masculinity, obsessive love, celebrating alcoholism, etc." He further added "If Kabir Singh were to inspire Indian men to turn into alcoholics, raging maniacs, would it be safe to assume that in a few years we'd see a full generation of youngsters inspired by biopics and our prime minister? [...] his tragi-comic story is so entertaining. Somewhere deep down it also reminds us of our own struggles, failures and flaws." Arnab Banerjee of Deccan Chroniclealso rated the film 1.5 out of 5 stars, criticising it for misogyny but praising the performances of the supporting cast members including Majumdar, Bajwa, Dutta and Oberoi. In response to criticism that Kabir Singhglorifies its eponymous hero's misogyny, Kapoor defended the character, saying, "There are all kinds of people in real life, including alpha-males who feel territorial entitlement, and I have played this character truthfully". Actor Manoj Bajpayee also defended the film, stressing on the futility of shutting down such films and indicating that censoring one film could lead to a trend of moral policing across various segments and potentially limit artistic expression. Filmmaker Anurag Kashyap defended the film, feeling it represented more than 70 to 80% of urban India, and that political correctness does not work all the time, particularly in cinema where making films with positive messages and love stories with happy endings has led to nowhere.

Khetani’s last release of 2019 was a sports action drama film Satellite Shankar which was directed by Irfan Kamal. This film marked Khetani’s first action film he produced. The film based on the life of Indian soldiers, tells a story of the adventures of Indian soldier. The film got negative reviews and was failure at box office. Filmfare gave 3 stars out of 5 and said, "Satellite Shankar meanders off course a wee bit, is melodramatic and OTT at times but its heart certainly beats for Indian armed forces alright."

After taking break for three years, he produced Bhool Bhulaiyaa 2 which was a sequel to Bhool Bhulaiyaa directed by Anees Bazmee. The film was a remake of the Malayalam film Geethaanjali. The film got positive reviews and success at box office. A critic for Bollywood Hungama gave the film four and a half stars out of five and wrote, "Bhool Bhulaiyaa 2 is a complete entertainer and works due to the splendid combo of horror and comedy."Pallabi Dey Purkayastha of The Times of India rated it three and a half stars out of five and wrote, "Bhool Bhulaiyaa 2 is an agglomeration of grief and the grieving." Rohit Vats of Daily News and Analysis gave it three and a half stars out of five and wrote, "Bhool Bhulaiyaa 2 is an out and out entertainer and next in the line of typical Bollywood 'masala' films." Avinash Lohana of Pinkvilla rated the film three stars out of five and wrote, "Kartik, Kiara and Tabu live up to their parts. The film has a mass appeal and the potential to bring the audience back into the theatres." Tushar Joshi of India Today similarly gave the film three stars out of five and wrote, "Bhool Bhulaiyaa 2 has all the masala and makings to satiate the taste buds. It's funny in places, tries to be scary most of the time, but like its title, its efforts get somewhere lost in a maze." Bharathi Pradhan of Lehren also gave it the same rating and wrote, "Tabu proves once again that she's a rare blend of versatility in performance with an arresting face. It's not the kind of film where you stop to look for logic." Rohit Bhatnagar of The Free Press Journal rated the film three stars out of five and wrote, "Horror-comedy is a tricky genre, but Anees Bazmee dabbles with funny one-liners and jump scares together quite well." Devesh Sharma of Filmfare, also with three stars out of five, wrote, "Watch the film for Tabu's and Kartik's performances and for its comic elements." Nandini Ramnath of Scroll.in also gave the film three stars out of five and wrote, "Bhool Bhulaiyaa 2 moves along on its hero's insouciance, Tabu's screen presence, and patches of entertaining comedy." In a mixed review, Sukanya Verna of Rediff.com rated the film two and a half stars out of five and found that the film did not take itself seriously to its strength, writing, "Bhool Bhulaiyaa 2 is a silly scary movie that knows it is a silly scary movie." Shalini Langer of The Indian Express rated the film two stars out of five and felt the humour could have been more sensitive: "There are repeated jokes at the expense of an overweight child and a hard-of-hearing pandit." With one and a half stars out of five, Tatsam Mukherjee of Firstpost lamented for the sequel having no narrative relation with the previous film, writing, "While the 2007 original used the vessel of a horror comedy to tell a rather important story about mental illness, the sequel regresses into actual bhoot-pret (ghost-spirits)."

=== 2023-present: Further success and upcoming movies ===
His first release was action crime thriller film Gumraah. The film was a remake of the 2019 Tamil film Thadam. It revolves around a murder investigation which becomes complicated after the police discover two lookalike suspects. The film received mixed reviews with praise for the action sequences, but underperformed commercially, becoming a box-office bomb. On the review aggregator website Rotten Tomatoes, 33% of 9 critics' reviews are positive, with an average rating of 5/10. Dhaval Roy of The Times of India rated the film 3.5 out of 5 stars and wrote "An engaging plot, twists and turns and good storytelling make Gumraah worth a visit to the theatre". Rishil Jogani of Pinkvilla rated the film 3.5 out of 5 stars and termed the film "very enjoyable" with elements of a commercial thriller. Ganesh Aaglave of Firstpost rated the film 3 out of 5 stars and wrote: "While the story with solid twists and turns looks exciting, the film lacked the gripping and pacey screenplay, which would have taken Gumraah to another level".

His second release of 2023 was thriller film Apurva starring Tara Sutatria. It was directly released on Disney+Hotstar. Apurva received mixed reviews from critics. On the review aggregator website Rotten Tomatoes, 20% of 5 critics' reviews are positive, with an average rating of 6/10. Dhaval Roy of Times of India rated the film 3.5/5 and wrote, "If your are looking for a movie that thrills, shocks and makes you hold your breath, this one's definitely for you as it ticks these boxes. Watch out for the ultimate face off between Apurva and one of the antagonists!" Writing for The Indian Express, Alaka Sahani wrote "had the makers of Apurva not harboured the ambition of being gritty and realistic, this probably would have come close to being a ‘slasher’ movie". A critic from Bollywood Hungama rated the film 3/5 stars and wrote "Apurva is a well-made gripping thriller." Hindustan Times's Prannay Pathak wrote, "Despite the unappetising lingering over the lead character’s body and the gratuitous violence punctuating the goings-on, Apurva never scares you or makes your skin crawl". Despite otherwise disliking the film, Deepa Gahlot of Rediff.com opined, "If at all the film does anything, it is to offer Tara Sutaria a role that allows her to act, rather than just dress up and play pretty love interest to the leading man". In a scathing review for Film Companion, Rahul Desai reviewed, "Apurva is predictable, tasteless and frighteningly dull, ticking genre boxes because they're cool and not because there's a story to be told". Rohit Bhatnagar of The Free Press Journal had a similar take stating, "Nagesh, although creates a world that is close to reality sans newness. Anushka Sharma’s NH10, and Imtiaz Ali’s Highway had similar tone, vibe, and atmosphere, a way better screenplay for that matter, Apurva looks stale in every aspect".

Khetani’s last film of 2023 was action drama Animal directed by Sandeep Reddy Vanga (marking his second collaboration with Vanga). The film follows Ranvijay, the ruthless son of a powerful industrialist, and his troubled relationship with his father, which gets further jeopardized as he sets out on a path of vengeance and destruction after an assassination attempt on his father. It received mixed reviews from critics, with praise for its cast performances, songs, action sequences and technical aspects, but criticism for the film's themes and graphic violence. Some commentators also accused Vanga of glorifying toxic masculinity and misogyny. Animal was a blockbuster success at box office. On the review aggregator website Rotten Tomatoes, 30% of 27 critics' reviews are positive, with an average rating of 4.4/10. The website's consensus reads: "Overlong, overly violent, and thinly written, Animal goes wildly over the top to little avail." Awarding the film 4.5/5 stars, Bollywood Hungama praised "Ranbir Kapoor’s outstanding performance, clap-worthy massy scenes, and interval block." Sukanya Vermaof Rediff gave 4/5 stars and wrote "Animal is relentless as a euphoric medley of feral rage and dance of the dysfunctional. The twists go on well until end credits as more blood is splattered our way." Monika Rawal Kukreja of Hindustan Timesfound it "an absolute massy, entertaining and extremely violent thriller which doesn't believe in conforming to the norms", while adding that the extreme violence might be off-putting for some. Conversely, Renuka Vyavahare of The Times of India gave 2.5/5 stars and termed the film "all swag and no substance derailed family drama"; she was critical of "Vanga's take on women or violence" but praised Ranbir's "raw sex appeal and unmatched intensity". In a negative review, Shubhra Gupta of The Indian Express expressed disappointment that the performances of Ranbir and Anil Kapoor had been "wasted in this pointless, vile tale". Saibal Chatterjee of NDTV gave 1.5/5 stars and wrote "The sickeningly violent father-son action drama rarely pauses for breath." Animal remains as Khetani’s highest grossing release.

Khetani’s first release was Bhool Bhulaiyaa 3 which is a sequel to Bhool Bhulaiyaa 2 directed by Anees Bazmee. The film released on Dilwali 2024. Bollywood Hungama rated the film 4.5 stars out of 5 and wrote, "Bhool Bhulaiyaa 3 is a well-made horror comedy which works due to its performances, taut script, creative execution and above all, an unpredictable climax." Sukanya Verma of Rediff.com rated the film 3/5 stars and opined "A gleefully hammy Madhuri and Vidya's volley of death stares and evil laughs engage in a ruthless glamorous tug of war in Bhool Bhulaiyaa 3". This film marked Khetani’s second collaboration with Kartik Aaryan and Bazmee.

He has currently two upcoming films. Khetani is co-producing with Atlee, Priya Atlee, and Jyoti Deshpande, The film is an action thriller film Baby John directed by Kalees. The film stars Varun Dhawan, Keerthy Suresh, Wamiqa Gabbi, and Jackie Shroff. The film is a remake of Theri which was previously directed by Atlee. The film was supposed to release on 31 May 2024 but was postponed due to post-production work. The film is scheduled to release in December 2024. He also currently producing Masti 4.

== Filmography ==
Key
†	Denotes films that have not yet been released

Year	Title	Notes
2013	Mickey Virus	
2014	The Shaukeens	
2017	Mubarakan	
2019	Notebook	
2019	Kabir Singh	
2019	Satellite Shankar	
2022	Bhool Bhulaiyaa 2	
2023	Apurva	
2023	Gumraah	
2023	Animal	
2024	Bhool Bhulaiyaa 3	
2024	Baby John	
2026	Baththa	Tamil film

== Accolades ==
List of accolades received by Murad Khetani
Award	Year	Category	Film	Result	Ref.
21st IIFA Awards	2020	Best Film	Kabir Singh	Won	
20th Zee Cine Awards	2020	Best Film	Kabir Singh	Nominated	
26th Screen Awards	2020	Best Film	Kabir Singh	Nominated	
Gold Choice Movie Awards	2020	Best Film	Kabir Singh	Nominated	
23rd IIFA Awards	2023	Best Film	Bhool Bhulaiyaa 2	Nominated	
