= Bhool Bhulaiyaa 2 =

2022 Indian film by Anees Bazmee

- Theatrical release poster
- Directed by: Anees Bazmee
- Screenplay by: Aakash Kaushik
- Dialogues by: Farhad Samji; Aakash Kaushik
- Story by: Aakash Kaushik
- Produced by: Bhushan Kumar; Murad Khetani; Krishan Kumar
- Starring: Kartik Aaryan; Kiara Advani; Tabu
- Cinematography: Manu Anand
- Edited by: Bunty Nagi
- Music by: Songs: Pritam; Tanishk Bagchi; Background score: Sandeep Shirodkar
- Production companies: T-Series Films; Cine1 Studios
- Distributed by: AA Films
- Release date: 20 May 2022
- Running time: 145 minutes
- Country: India
- Language: Hindi
- Budget: ₹65 crore
- Box office: ₹266.88 crore

Bhool Bhulaiyaa 2 (transl. Labyrinth/Maze 2) is a 2022 Indian Hindi-language comedy horror film directed by Anees Bazmee, written by Aakash Kaushik and Farhad Samji, and produced by T-Series Films and Cine1 Studios. It is a standalone sequel to the 2007 film Bhool Bhulaiyaa. The film stars Kartik Aaryan alongside Kiara Advani and Tabu, and follows travel enthusiast Ruhaan Randhawa, who, after bumping into Reet Thakur, the descendant of a royal family in Bhawanigarh, has to pose as a fraud psychic, Rooh Baba, to deal with the return of Manjulika, a malevolent spirit hell-bent on vengeance against the Thakur family.

Principal photography began in October 2019. The production faced prolonged delays due to the COVID-19 pandemic, before resuming in 2021 and ending in February 2022. It was filmed in Lucknow, Jaipur, Mumbai, and Manali. The film's score was composed by Sandeep Shirodkar, while the songs were composed by Pritam with lyrics written by Amitabh Bhattacharya, Yo Yo Honey Singh, Mandy Gill, and Saaveri Verma, while two songs originally written by lyricist Sameer for the 2007 original were credited to him, including a remix of the title track, recreated by Tanishk Bagchi, who is credited as co-composer.

Bhool Bhulaiyaa 2 released theatrically worldwide on 20 May 2022 and received generally positive reviews from critics, with particular praise for Tabu and Aaryan's performances, humour, musical score, soundtrack, cinematography, and direction, but received criticism for the writing and editing. The film earned ₹266.88 crore (US$28 million) worldwide and became the fourth highest-grossing Hindi film and ninth highest-grossing Indian film of 2022. The film received 10 nominations at the 68th Filmfare Awards, including Best Film, Best Director (Bazmee), Best Actress (Tabu), and Best Actor (Aaryan), and won Best Actress (Critics) (Tabu). A spiritual sequel, Bhool Bhulaiyaa 3, starring Aaryan with Vidya Balan, Madhuri Dixit, and Triptii Dimri, was released on Diwali 2024.

== Plot ==
Within a mansion in Bhawanigarh, Rajasthan, in 2004, powerful sorcerers and priests perform sacred rituals, and supernatural events begin occurring throughout the palace due to a malevolent spirit named Manjulika, who is determined to attack the family's daughter-in-law, Anjulika. A sorcerer intervenes and forces the spirit into a chamber, sealing it inside with a powerful trishul and sacred amulets placed on the door. Afterwards, the family abandons the mansion for safety.

Eighteen years later, in Himachal Pradesh, travel vlogger and influencer Ruhaan Randhawa meets medical college student Reet Thakur, who is travelling to Bhawanigarh via Chandigarh to reluctantly marry her fiancé, Sagar. They board a bus to Chandigarh but cut short their journey to attend a music carnival Reet agrees to be in at Ruhaan's suggestion, later discovering that the bus on which they were supposed to travel had met with an accident, killing everyone on board. Subsequently, the Thakurs, owners of the abandoned mansion, presume Reet, the elder daughter of the family, to be dead. Reet attempts to contact her family, but overhears a conversation between her younger sister Trisha and Sagar over the phone, realizing that they are having an affair. Hoping to spare them from a loveless marriage and avoid marrying Sagar herself, Reet goes along with her family's assumption of her death and travels to Bhawanigarh with a hesitant Ruhaan.

Reet drags Ruhaan into the mansion, despite his belief that it is haunted. Together, they hide in the abandoned ancestral mansion, but Chote Pandit, a priest, notices that the mansion doors have been opened and informs the Thakurs. Accompanied by the villagers, they enter the mansion. Reet hides, and they find an exposed Ruhaan, who covers up the situation while by falsely claiming that Reet's spirit led him there and that her final wish is to see her family living in the ancestral mansion, with Trisha getting married. Influenced by Ruhaan, the Thakurs arrange Trisha's wedding to Sagar. Due to his supposed ability to communicate with spirits, Ruhaan becomes popular as Rooh Baba, and he and in-hiding Reet become friends. When Ruhaan is led to the room where the spirit was trapped, Anjulika, Reet's sister-in-law, warns him to stay away from it and reveals that the spirit is actually her twin sister, Manjulika.

A flashback reveals that the sisters had moved to the mansion when their father, Debanshu, was appointed to manage the Thakurs' accounts. Debanshu's preferential treatment towards Anjulika's talents instilled jealousy in Manjulika, which gradually turns into hatred. Both sisters fall in love with Kunwar Thakur, Reet's elder brother. However, Kunwar reciprocates Anjulika's feelings, leaving Manjulika enraged and heartbroken. Seeking solace in learning black magic, Manjulika decides to use it as a weapon against Anjulika. On the night of Kunwar and Anjulika's wedding, Manjulika brutally stabs Debanshu after he discovers the truth and sets out to murder Anjulika. However, Anjulika defends herself and fatally stabs Manjulika in self-defence. Even after death, Manjulika's spirit continues tormenting the family and paralyses Kunwar by pushing him off a balcony. The priests eventually capture Manjulika's spirit and imprison it in a room.

After the flashback, Reet's father reveals to Ruhaan that Manjulika's curse has killed eight members of their family. Chote Pandit's elder brother, Bade Pandit, and his elder brother's wife, Panditayeen's business is suffering because of Ruhaan's popularity. One night, Chote Pandit finds Ruhaan and Reet wandering around the mansion and discovers the truth. With the help of Bade Pandit and Panditayeen, Chote Pandit leads a search of the mansion. Knowing that no one would dare enter Manjulika's room, Reet decides to hide there, and Chote Pandit's accusations are proven false to the family. Once freed, Manjulika attacks Anjulika, who discovers that Reet is alive and joins forces with Ruhaan and Reet to ward off the spirit. They seek help from the same priest who had captured Manjulika's spirit, but he informs them that he requires three days. Manjulika's spirit possesses the priest, forcing him to kill his disciples before he is himself killed. Ruhaan encounters the spirit and falls from a terrace in terror.

Ruhaan returns to the palace, singing and speaking in Bengali, claiming to be Manjulika, revealing that he is possessed. The Thakurs spot Reet and discover that she is alive. Ruhaan attacks Anjulika, who uses Reet as a human shield by threatening to slit her throat if Ruhaan attacks her, while addressing him as "Anjulika", confusing the family. Ruhaan then reveals that he had merely been pretending to be possessed and that the woman who died in 2004 was actually Anjulika, while the woman living with them is the real Manjulika.

In 2004, after killing Debanshu with the assistance of the priest, who is revealed to be Manjulika's accomplice, Manjulika used black magic to manipulate Anjulika and steal her identity. Disguised as Manjulika under the influence of black magic, Anjulika attacked Manjulika, who then stabbed her to death under the guise of self-defence. When Kunwar uncovered the truth, Manjulika pushed him off the balcony, paralysing him and preventing him from exposing her. She also murdered eight members of the family after they learnt the truth. In the present day, Anjulika's spirit attacks Manjulika and imprisons her in the same room in which she had been locked in 2004. Anjulika's spirit shares a final moment with her family and asks Reet's father to forgive her for revealing the truth about Anjulika and Manjulika. She thanks Ruhaan and asks the family to leave, as she has unfinished business with Manjulika. Anjulika enters the room and tortures the real Manjulika to death. The Thakur family departs, and the mansion is abandoned once again.

== Cast ==
- Kartik Aaryan as Ruhaan Randhawa / Rooh Baba
- Kiara Advani as Reet Thakur
- Tabu in dual roles as:
  - Anjulika Chatterjee
  - Manjulika Chatterjee
- Rajpal Yadav as Chhote Pandit
- Sanjay Mishra as Bade Pandit
- Ashwini Kalsekar as Panditayeen
- Rajesh Sharma as Kulwant Thakur
- Amar Upadhyay as Kunwar Thakur
- Mehak Manwani as Trisha Thakur
- Samarth Chauhan as Punit "Potlu" Thakur
- Vyoma Nandi as Rajeshwari "Rajjo" Thakur
- Milind Gunaji as Thakur Vijender Singh
- Karmveer Choudhary as Mukhiyaji
- Govind Namdev as Tantrik Baba
- Kali Prasad Mukherjee as Debanshu Chatterjee

== Production ==
=== Development ===
A sequel to Bhool Bhulaiyaa (2007) was officially announced on 19 August 2019. Bhushan Kumar, chairman of T-Series, had long considered creating a franchise based on the 2007 film. Aakash Kaushik and Farhad Samji had two separate scripts prepared for their independent films. Samji felt that elements of their two scripts could work together for a new film, and they pitched the idea to producer Murad Khetani. Khetani felt the idea had promise and could work as a sequel to Bhool Bhulaiyaa. Eventually, he approached Kumar, who came on board, collaborating with Khetani for the second time since Kabir Singh, which also starred Kiara Advani.

Vidya Balan was approached to reprise her role as Manjulika for the film but declined, expressing concern that a less successful performance could tarnish the legacy and impact of her portrayal in the 2007 film. The character was subsequently recast with Tabu, of whom Vidya spoke fondly. Vidya eventually returned for the sequel as Manjulika.

=== Filming ===
Bhool Bhulaiyaa 2 began filming on 9 October 2019 and wrapped up on 25 February 2022. Aaryan lost his voice while filming the climax sequence of the film. It was filmed in a real mansion. Filming was occurring in Lucknow, before the pandemic disrupted the schedule. It was shot in Mumbai and Manali, Himachal Pradesh.

== Release ==
=== Theatrical ===
Bhool Bhulaiyaa 2 was released on 20 May 2022. The film was originally scheduled to be released in theatres on 31 July 2020, but was delayed due to the COVID-19 pandemic.

=== Home media ===
The digital streaming rights of the film were acquired by Netflix. The film was digitally streamed on Netflix from 19 June 2022. The satellite rights were acquired by Sony Max, where it premiered on 16 October 2022. On 30 October 2022, a simulcast release of Bhool Bhulaiyaa 2 occurred on all Sony Network Channels like Sony Max, SET India, Sony SAB and Sony Pal.

== Soundtrack ==
Bhool Bhulaiyya 2

Soundtrack album by Pritam and Tanishk Bagchi
- Released: 1 June 2022
- Recorded: 2020–2021
- Genre: Feature film soundtrack
- Length: 34:37
- Language: Hindi
- Label: T-Series
- Producer: Bhushan Kumar

Official audio
- Bhool Bhulaiyya 2 - Full Album on YouTube

The music of the film was composed by Pritam, while Tanishk Bagchi appeared as the guest composer, recreating the title track along with Pritam. The lyrics were written by Amitabh Bhattacharya, Sameer, Yo Yo Honey Singh, Mandy Gill, and Saaveri Verma.

The song "Bhool Bhulaiyaa 2 Title Track" was recreated from the title track for the 2007 film Bhool Bhulaiyaa, which was sung by Neeraj Shridhar and written by Sameer. This is the second time the song is being recreated after the 2017 film Commando 2, which was titled "Hare Krishna Hare Ram", sung by Armaan Malik, Raftaar, and Ritika, and composed by Gourov-Roshin.

The song "Ami Je Tomar/Mere Dholna Sun" from the prequel was also retained in the film. Shreya Ghoshal, who sung "Mere Dholna" in the 2007 prequel, reprised her vocals and is featured in three different versions of the song in the film.

Due to fan demand, a version of "Ami Je Tomar" featuring the vocals of Arijit Singh and Shreya Ghoshal was also released as a duet with the title "Ami Je Tomar Kartik X Vidya" on 28 June 2022, taking from each video clip of the song.

All music is composed by Pritam except where mentioned.

Track listing
No.	Title	Lyrics	Singer(s)	Length
1.	"Bhool Bhulaiyaa 2 (Title Track)" (co-composed by Tanishk Bagchi)	Mandy Gill, Sameer	Neeraj Shridhar, Mellow D, Bob	3:31
2.	"Hum Nashe Mein Toh Nahin"	Amitabh Bhattacharya	Arijit Singh, Tulsi Kumar	3:58
3.	"De Taali"	Amitabh Bhattacharya, Yo Yo Honey Singh	Yo Yo Honey Singh, Armaan Malik, Shashwat Singh	3:30
4.	"Mere Dholna" (Arijit Version)	Sameer	Arijit Singh	6:04
5.	"Ami Je Tomar Tandav"	Sameer	Arijit Singh	2:23
6.	"Ami Je Tomar Tandav" (Film Version)	Sameer	Arijit Singh	2:24
7.	"Ami Je Tomar" (Kiara's Scare)	Sameer	Shreya Ghoshal, Arijit Singh	1:38
8.	"Mere Dholna" (The Sisters)	Sameer	Shreya Ghoshal	2:25
9.	"Mere Dholna" (Revisited)	Saaveri Verma, Sameer	Shreya Ghoshal	2:32
10.	"Ami Je Tomar" (Kartik X Vidya)	Sameer	Arijit Singh, Shreya Ghoshal	6:12
Total length:				34:37

T-Series also released the "Cine Audio" of Bhool Bhulaiyaa 2 on 24 June 2022.

Bhool Bhulaiyaa 2 (Cine Audio)
No.	Title	Length
1.	"Introduction with Ruhaan and Reet"	16:39
2.	"Entering the Bhool Bhulaiyaa"	19:20
3.	"The Horror Begins"	18:18
4.	"Manjulika's Story"	20:24
5.	"The Ghost Strikes"	20:25
6.	"Meeting Monjulika"	16:34
7.	"The Revenge of the Spirit"	28:36
Total length:		142:16

== Reception ==
=== Box office ===
Bhool Bhulaiyaa 2 earned ₹14.11 crore (US$1.5 million) at the domestic box office on its opening day. On the second day, the film collected ₹18.34 crore (US$1.9 million). On the third day, the film collected ₹23.51 crore (US$2.4 million) taking total domestic weekend collection to ₹55.96 crore (US$5.8 million).

As of 8 July 2022, the film grossed ₹221.33 crore (US$23 million) in India and ₹45.55 crore (US$4.7 million) overseas, for a worldwide gross collection of ₹266.88 crore (US$28 million), to become the fourth highest-grossing Hindi film of 2022.

=== Critical response ===
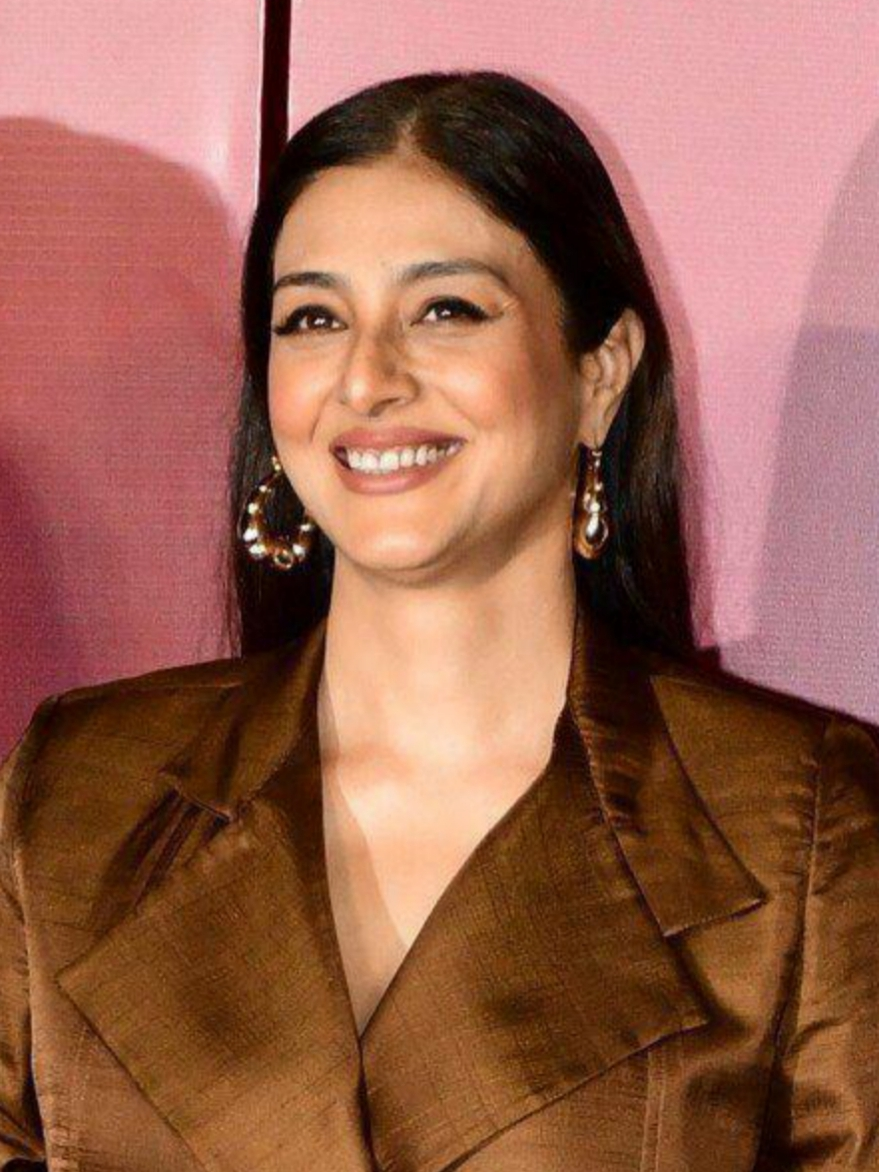
Tabu's performance received praise from critics, and she was awarded the Filmfare Critics Award for Best Actress

Bhool Bhulaiyaa 2 received positive reviews from critics. On the review aggregator website Rotten Tomatoes, 63% of 8 critics' reviews are positive, with an average rating of 5/10.

A critic for Bollywood Hungama gave the film four and a half stars out of five and wrote, "Bhool Bhulaiyaa 2 is a complete entertainer and works due to the splendid combo of horror and comedy." Pallabi Dey Purkayastha of The Times of India rated it three and a half stars out of five and wrote, "Bhool Bhulaiyaa 2 is an agglomeration of grief and the grieving." Rohit Vats of Daily News and Analysis gave it three and a half stars out of five and wrote, "Bhool Bhulaiyaa 2 is an out and out entertainer and next in the line of typical Bollywood 'masala' films." Avinash Lohana of Pinkvilla rated the film three stars out of five and wrote, "Kartik, Kiara and Tabu live up to their parts. The film has a mass appeal and the potential to bring the audience back into the theatres." Tushar Joshi of India Today similarly gave the film three stars out of five and wrote, "Bhool Bhulaiyaa 2 has all the masala and makings to satiate the taste buds. It's funny in places, tries to be scary most of the time, but like its title, its efforts get somewhere lost in a maze." Bharathi Pradhan of Lehren also gave it the same rating and wrote, "Tabu proves once again that she's a rare blend of versatility in performance with an arresting face. It's not the kind of film where you stop to look for logic."

Rohit Bhatnagar of The Free Press Journal rated the film three stars out of five and wrote, "Horror-comedy is a tricky genre, but Anees Bazmee dabbles with funny one-liners and jump scares together quite well." Devesh Sharma of Filmfare, also with three stars out of five, wrote, "Watch the film for Tabu's and Kartik's performances and for its comic elements." Nandini Ramnath of Scroll.in also gave the film three stars out of five and wrote, "Bhool Bhulaiyaa 2 moves along on its hero's insouciance, Tabu's screen presence, and patches of entertaining comedy." In a mixed review, Sukanya Verma of Rediff.com rated the film two and a half stars out of five and found that the film did not take itself seriously to its strength, writing, "Bhool Bhulaiyaa 2 is a silly scary movie that knows it is a silly scary movie." Shalini Langer of The Indian Express rated the film two stars out of five and felt the humour could have been more sensitive: "There are repeated jokes at the expense of an overweight child and a hard-of-hearing pandit." With one and a half stars out of five, Tatsam Mukherjee of Firstpost lamented for the sequel having no narrative relation with the previous film, writing, "While the 2007 original used the vessel of a horror comedy to tell a rather important story about mental illness, the sequel regresses into actual bhoot-pret (ghost-spirits)."

== Sequel ==
A third instalment in the franchise, titled Bhool Bhulaiyaa 3, was officially announced by T-Series with a teaser on 1 March 2023. Directed by Anees Bazmee, the film stars Kartik Aaryan, who reprises his role as Rooh Baba, alongside Vidya Balan, returning as Manjulika from the 2007 film, along with Madhuri Dixit and Triptii Dimri. Bhool Bhulaiyaa 3 was released on 1 November 2024, coinciding with the Diwali festival.

== See also ==
- Geethaanjali, a spin-off to the original Malayalam version of Bhool Bhulaiyaa, Manichitrathazhu, with similar plot.
