= Up to Something =

Up to Something may refer to:

- "Up to Something", song by Metro Boomin from Not All Heroes Wear Capes
- "Up to Something", song by Naaz from Bits of Naaz
- “Up to Something”, song by Ruel from Bright Lights, Red Eyes
