= Mess It Up =

Mess It Up may refer to:

- "Mess It Up", 2005 song by PSC from the album 25 to Life
- "Mess It Up", 2021 song by Gracie Abrams
- "Mess It Up", 2024 song by the Rolling Stones from the album Hackney Diamonds
- "Mess It Up", song from the soundtrack of the 2011 film Mumbai Mast Kallander

== See also ==
- Mess Me Up (disambiguation)
