= Mess Me Up =

Mess Me Up may refer to:

- "Mess Me Up", a 2018 song by Naaz from Bits of Naaz
- "Mess Me Up", a 2017 single by Gary Allan
- "Mess Me Up", a 2020 song by Neon Trees from I Can Feel You Forgetting Me

== See also ==
- Mess It Up (disambiguation)
