= Baby John (film) =

2024 Indian film by Kalees

- Theatrical release poster
- Directed by: Kalees
- Written by: Atlee; Kalees; Sumit Arora
- Screenplay by: Kalees
- Based on: Theri by Atlee
- Produced by: Jyoti Deshpande; Murad Khetani; Atlee; Priya Atlee
- Starring: Varun Dhawan; Keerthy Suresh; Wamiqa Gabbi; Jackie Shroff
- Cinematography: Kiran Koushik
- Edited by: Ruben
- Music by: Thaman S
- Production companies: Jio Studios; Cine1 Studios; A for Apple Studios
- Distributed by: PVR Inox Pictures; Pen Marudhar
- Release date: 25 December 2024
- Running time: 161 minutes
- Country: India
- Language: Hindi
- Budget: ₹180 crore
- Box office: est. ₹56.49–59 crore

Baby John is a 2024 Indian Hindi-language action thriller film directed by Kalees. It is a remake of Atlee's 2016 Tamil film Theri. The film stars Varun Dhawan, Keerthy Suresh (in her Hindi film debut), Wamiqa Gabbi, Zara Zyanna and Jackie Shroff.

The film was officially announced in July 2023 and the official title was revealed in February 2024. Principal photography held in Mumbai and Kerala commenced in August 2023 and ended in October 2024. The music was composed by Thaman S, with cinematography by Kiran Koushik and editing by Ruben.

Baby John was theatrically released on 25 December 2024, coinciding with Christmas. It received mixed reviews from critics and audiences, but emerged as a box-office disaster.

== Plot ==
John D'Silva, a bakery owner, lives in Kerala with his daughter Khushi, his dog Tiger, and his best friend Jackie. When Khushi is bullied and beaten up by her classmate, John teaches Khushi to stand up for herself, because non-violence is not always effective. When Khushi beats up her bully, her teacher, Tara, asks to meet her parents. John befriends Tara, who eventually develops a crush on him.

While visiting a church with John and Tara, Khushi provokes a sex-trafficking gang looking at a girl, Devi, they kidnapped to traffick, but John quickly diffuses the situation. Tara notices the victim hiding in the mob and hides her in the boot of their vehicle, unbeknownst to John and Khushi, and heads to the police station to file a complaint. John gets angry at Tara for bringing Khushi to a police station without his permission. The police officer asks if he has met John before in Dehradun, and John explains in fluent Malayalam that he has lived in Kerala for generations. This surprises Tara, because earlier John told her that he doesn't speak Malayalam. When John is about to leave, the police officer calls him Satya from behind, causing John to pause for a moment. Tara notices the entire incident. Later, the police informs the gang and at night, the gang arrives at John's house to kill Khushi, forcing John to turn violent and kill the goons.

Tara, suspicious of John's behaviour at the police station, looks him up online. She eventually learns that John is actually DCP Satya Verma and arrives at John's location just as John defeats the goons. Jackie, whose real name was HC Ram Sevak and Satya Verma's friend, learns that Tara is a covert officer and her real name is Adhira Verman. Jackie starts explaining John's past to her.

Past: Six years ago, DCP Satya Verma lives with his mother and is the scourge of local criminals. One day, he receives a complaint from the parents of a teenage girl named Amba, who has been missing for days, while the local police didn't do anything to find her. Satya begins the investigation and learns that Ashwin, the spoilt son of a notorious politician Nanaji, aka Babbar Sher, and his henchmen had sexually assaulted Amba, broken her legs, repeatedly stabbed her, and burnt her to death. Nanaji is also involved in human trafficking and is known to brazenly traffick the daughters of his employees who remain silent to spare their own lives.

John tries to arrest Ashwin, but when he goes to Nanaji's residency, finds his superior officer celebrating Ashwin's victory in the election. Nanaji reminds Satya to salute Ashwin the next time he sees him. He asks Ram Sevak what can be done and Ram Sevak shows him a report stating that every year, 33000 women are raped in India, i.e., 4 women every hour. Knowing that the court and the legal system will do nothing about Amba's murder, Satya brutally kills Ashwin and reveals this to Babbar Sher, who swears to avenge Ashwin's death.

Meanwhile, Satya saves a few kids from a street-begging racket and when attacked by the racketeers, he beats them up. He takes the badly beaten up goons to the hospital, and meets Meera, a Chennai-based doctor. Despite being annoyed with Satya at first, Meera quickly finds him endearing when she sees him sponsoring the education of the kids he rescued. The two fall in love with each other. Later, Satya goes to meet Meera's family, only for Babbar Sher to send goons to kill Satya at the same time. Satya defeats them and arrests Babbar Sher at Ashwin's funeral. Meera meets with Satya and urges him to leave the police force, but Satya manages to convince her to let him stay at his job. Satya and Meera marry each other and lead a happy life, and welcomes their daughter Khushi.

On the night of Khushi's birthday, Babbar Sher, Bhima, and Inspector Baldev Patil barge in at Satya's house, where they kill Meera, Satya's mother Madhvi and attempt to drown Khushi. A dying Meera saves Khushi, where she makes Satya to take a vow that he would leave the police force and lead a peaceful life with Khushi. Satya accepts the vow, where he bids a tearful goodbye to Meera and fakes his death to lead a peaceful life with Khushi.

Present: Adhira feels sad about Satya's tragic life and starts caring for him and Khushi. When Khushi goes on a school trip, Babbar Sher, who has learned that Satya and Khushi are alive, orchestrates an accident on the school bus. With the help of Adhira and the local people, Satya manages to save Khushi. Learning that Babbar is behind the accident, Satya decides to exact vengeance and returns to Mumbai, puts an end to Babbar Sher's illegal activities and kills Baldev and Bhima. Babbar Sher kidnaps Khushi despite attempts from Ram and Adhira in stopping them, Satya arrives at Babbar Sher's hideout, saves Khushi and a group of women, who later charge towards Babbar Sher, killing him.

Two years later, Satya becomes a RAW field agent and lives with Adhira, Jackie and Agent Bhaijaan on a mission to end Boss and kills DGP Yashraj Mukerjee for helping Babbar Sher earlier.

== Cast ==
- Varun Dhawan as DCP Satya Verma IPS / John D'Silva / Agent Baby John
- Keerthy Suresh as Dr. Meera Verma, Satya's wife
- Wamiqa Gabbi as Tara / Adhira Verman IPS, Khushi’s teacher and a spy
- Jackie Shroff as Nanaji / Babbar Sher
- Rajpal Yadav as Ram Sevak / Jackie
- Zara Zyanna as Khushi Verma, Satya and Meera’s daughter
- Sheeba Chaddha as Madhvi Verma, Satya's mother
- Zakir Hussain as Inspector Baldev Patil
- Prakash Belawadi as DGP Yashraj Mukherjee IPS
- Armaan Khera as Ashwin, Nanaji's son
- Shrikant Yadav as Bhima Rane, Nanaji's younger brother
- B. S. Avinash as Samba
- Resh Lamba as Vishnu
- Sadanand Patil as Kaali Prasad
- Snigddha Suman as Amba
- Kaali Venkat as Amba's father
- Sonalli Sharmisshtha as Amba's mother
- Omkar Das Manikpuri as Badrinath
- Anoop Puri as Meera's father
- Geeta Tyagi as Meera's aunt
- Reenaye Tejani as Meera's cousin
- Mushtaq Khan as Principal
- Jaffer Sadiq as Boss
- Naresh Gosain as Finance Minister
- Sahidur Rahaman as SP Amanpreet Singh IPS
- Kanchan Pagare as Corona
- Ajay Madhok as the bride's father
- Sanya Malhotra as Satya's prospective bride (special appearance)
- Salman Khan as Agent Bhaijaan (cameo appearance)

== Production ==
=== Development ===
In late April 2020, reports of a potential Hindi remake was being planned with Varun Dhawan being approached to play the lead role. However, it was undisclosed whether Atlee, the director of the original film, would direct the venture or give the role to someone else. Reportedly, the director had met the actor in Mumbai during 2019 to discuss the possibilities of a possible collaboration in the near future. However, no development took place until in early March 2022, as Dhawan had reportedly completed his existing commitments, he met Atlee again to finalise their project.

On 19 March, their collaboration was publicly announced. Tentatively titled as VD18, instead of directing it, Atlee was revealed to produce the project under his house A for Apple Productions, along with Murad Khetani's Cine1 Studios and Jyoti Deshpande's Jio Studios. Kalees, who had earlier assisted Atlee and directed the Tamil techno-thriller film Kee (2019), was hired to helm the project. The official title Baby John was announced on 5 February 2024. In an interview with Trisha Bhattacharya of India Today, Dhawan stated: "When Atlee came with this film, there was a reason behind it, and he said that we had to change a lot of the geography of the film. We have to use it as an adaptation and not really a proper remake, and I think that's what's done." He also added that the film, highlighted real-life incidents about women's safety in India and a contemporary take on parenting.

=== Casting ===
Janhvi Kapoor was reported to play the lead actress role, pairing opposite Varun for the second time after Bawaal (2023). However, Keerthy Suresh was later confirmed to have replaced Kapoor, thereby marking her Hindi film debut. She would reportedly receive a remuneration of ₹3 crore (US$310,000) and reprise Samantha's role in the original film. Wamiqa Gabbi was cast to reprise the role of Amy Jackson. Jackie Shroff was cast to play the main antagonist, reprising the role of late Mahendran.

Initially, Alaayna Hussain was cast to play the role of Dhawan's daughter, reprising the role of Baby Nainika (daughter of Meena in real life). But, she was replaced by Zara Zyanna, during the production. Rajpal Yadav and Sheeba Chaddha were cast in pivotal roles, reprising the role of Rajendran and Radhika Sarathkumar, respectively. Sanya Malhotra makes a special appearance as a prospective bride of Dhawan, reprising the role of Sunaina. Salman Khan would also make a cameo appearance, ahead of his collaboration with Atlee for a potential project.

=== Filming ===
Principal photography commenced with an inaugural puja ceremony on 9 August 2023. The first schedule was commenced the following day in Mumbai. Borivali, Bandra and Dharavi were the areas. On 7 September, Dhawan stated that he had injured his foot during filming which caused the film to be put on hold. After his recovery, shooting resumed on 12 September. Gabbi began filming her portions from 15 December, with production moving to Kerala. On 23 December, filming was put on hold due to Dhawan getting injured again. The first schedule was completed by 27 December.

On 17 March 2024, filming for the second schedule commenced in Mumbai. Shooting also happened in Mallapuram. By 2 April, Dhawan in his Instagram account, revealed that he had completed 70 days of filming his portions. A song featuring Dhawan and Suresh ("Nain Mataka") was filmed at specially constructed sets erected at Film City, Mumbai. Filming wrapped on 24 April, coinciding Dhawan's birthday.

== Music ==
The soundtrack and original background score were composed by Thaman S with lyrics written by Irshad Kamil, Adviteeya Vojjala, Ritesh G. Rao, Rajakumari and Abhiruchi Chand. The first single titled "Nain Matakka" was released on 25 November 2024. The second single "Pikley Pom" was released on 6 December 2024. The third single titled "Bandobast" was released on 14 December 2024. The fourth single titled "Hazaar Baar" was released on 19 December 2024. The fifth single titled "Beast Mode" was released on 22 December 2024. The album of the film was released on 14 January 2025 by Zee Music Company.

== Release ==
=== Theatrical ===
Baby John was initially scheduled to be released on 31 May 2024 in theatres, but was postponed due to unfinished post-production works. It was released worldwide on 25 December 2024, coinciding the occasion of Christmas.

=== Home media ===
The digital streaming rights of the film were acquired by Amazon Prime Video. It began streaming on the platform from 19 February 2025.

== Reception ==
=== Critical response ===
Baby John received mixed reviews from critics and audiences, with criticism for its sluggish pacing, unoriginal plot, and lack of suspense, but praised performances, action sequences and score. On the review aggregator website Rotten Tomatoes, 29% of 14 critics' reviews are positive, with an average rating of 3.9/10.

Aman Wadhwa of DNA India gave 3.5/5 stars and wrote "Baby John is the perfect masala entertainer that the Bollywood needed to round off a rather disappointing year". Chirag Sehgal of News 18 gave 3/5 stars and wrote "While Baby John boasts commendable performances, it falls short of being a compelling thriller due to its lackluster plot and uneven pacing." Anam Shaikh of Spottoday gave 3/5 stars and wrote "A Mass Entertainer with Heart and Action".

Sana Farzeen of India Today gave 3/5 stars and wrote "Baby John could either benefit from the withdrawal symptoms fans are experiencing after Pushpa 2: The Rule or lose the battle to Allu Arjun's mass-actioner." Lachmi Deb Roy of Firstpost gave 3/5 stars and wrote "Varun Dhawan has done a good job as an action hero, the show stellar is undoubtedly Jackie Shroff, but Wamiqa Gabbi is hugely underused in the film". Rishil Jogani of Pinkvilla gave 2.5/5 stars and wrote "Baby John attempts to tackle a serious social issue but falls short due to its superficial treatment and over-reliance on overused narrative tropes. While the action sequences and background score are commendable, the film fails to provide a nuanced or innovative take on its subject matter." Dhaval Roy of Times of India gave 2.5/5 stars and wrote "Varun Dhawan impresses, balancing a dual role as a caring father and a fearless cop. His performance adds depth and conviction to the otherwise predictable narrative.[...] The movie has its moments as an actioner, but in terms of content and narrative, it could have more impactful."

Tanmayi Savadi of Times Now gave 2.5/5 stars and wrote "Baby John is a good attempt at fan service. But, offers nothing fresh and exciting. It is high time to redefine mass actioners that come from South filmmakers." Kartik Bhardwaj of Cinema Express gave 2/5 stars and wrote "Baby John feels like a feverishly hurried version of Theri. It doesn't let the characters marinate and is too eager to get to the conflict. The build-up is often half-baked, and the action, when it comes, is underwhelming." Aishwarya Vasudevan of OTT Play gave 2/5 stars and wrote "Baby John tries to rock the cradle of Bollywood with South Indian masala but ends up crying over spilt milk."

Saibal Chatterjee of NDTV gave 2/5 stars and wrote "Trouble is that Baby John falls way, way short of working action movie fans up into a celebratory frenzy." Shubhra Gupta of The Indian Express gave 1/5 stars and wrote "Baby John bids fair to claim the title of the worst film of 2024, a year when big, starry Bollywood tanked well and truly." Rishabh Suri of Hindustan Times wrote "Overall, there's nothing much that makes Baby John stand out apart from the action. It's watchable if you can sit through the boring songs, and the atrocious first half hour."

Bollywood Hungama gave 3.5/5 stars and wrote "Baby John is a mass entertainer which works due to the clapworthy moments, the message, Varun Dhawan's energetic performance and the cameo by Salman Khan. At the box office, the film will benefit owing to the long holiday period and no competition until Republic Day."

=== Box office ===
The film was estimated to have collected ₹11.25 to ₹13.5 crore net on its opening day at the domestic box office. As of 2 January 2025, the film grossed ₹39.74 crore in India and ₹13.66 crore internationally, bringing its total worldwide gross to ₹53.4 crore. It concluded its run with worldwide gross estimated to be ₹56.49–59 crore.
