= Saru Maini =

Indian playback singer (born 1988)

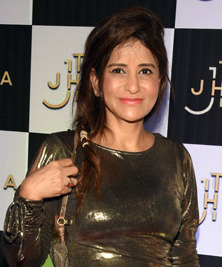
- Saru Maini graces the launch of Jhatka club in 2019

Background information
- Born: 27 April 1988 (age 37); Bangalore, Karnataka, India
- Origin: India
- Genres: Bollywood, Indian pop
- Occupation: Singer
- Years active: 2006–present
- Labels: T-Series; Zee Music Company

Saru Maini (born 27 April 1988) is an Indian playback singer. Saru made her debut in the playback genre with the song "Bhangara Paale" in a duet with Sonu Nigam, for the movie Anthony Kaun Hai? in 2006.

== Early life and career ==
Saru hails from Bangalore. At an early she her music video of her song entitled "Dil De Diya Tha" (Sutta Mix) became popular. Actress Meghna Naidu was featured in the song. She has performed musical themes for the movie Mumbai Mast Kallander.

== Discography ==
Denotes films that have not yet been released

=== film songs ===
Year	Song	Film	Composer	Co-singer
2006	"Bhangara Paale"	Anthony Kaun Hai?	–	Sonu Nigam; Jayesh Gandhi
2011	"Sloshed "	Mumbai Mast Kallander	Teenu Arora	Neeraj Shridhar
2018	"Laung Gawacha"	5 Weddings	–	–
