= Neeraj Shridhar =

Indian film composer and singer-songwriter

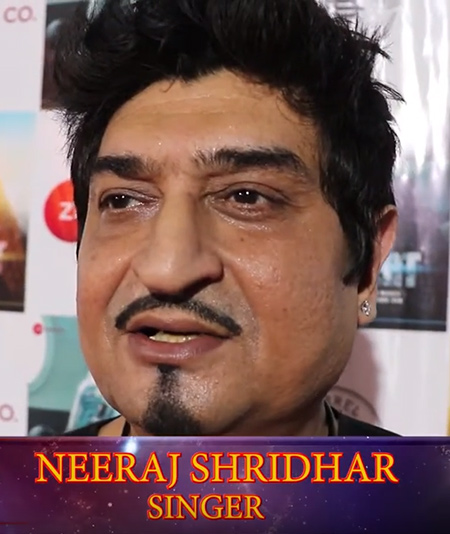
- Neeraj Shridhar in 2019
- Occupations: Film composer; playback singer
- Known for: Bombay Vikings

Neeraj Shridhar is an Indian film playback singer, composer and singer-songwriter who was the lead vocalist of Indian pop and rock group Bombay Vikings. Bombay Vikings became popular with remix hits like "Kya Soorat Hai", "Woh Chali" and "Chod Do Anchal".

== Career ==
=== Bombay Vikings ===
Bombay Vikings is a pop and rock group that combines Indian and classical music. It was formed in 1994.

=== 2003-2007: Career beginnings as a playback singer ===
Neeraj Shridhar started working as a Bollywood playback singer in 2006 with the song "Tumko Dekha" for the film God Tussi Great Ho, although the film got released later. He also sang "Halke Halke" in Honeymoon Travels Pvt. Ltd. and "Bhagam Bhag" from Bhagam Bhag in the same year. After this, Shridhar sang songs like "Ticket To Hollywood" from the film Jhoom Barabar Jhoom, "Heyy Babyy" from Heyy Babyy, "Ishq Subhanallah" from Mere Baap Pehle Aap, "Ishq Ka Kalma" from Dhan Dhana Dhan Goal, and "Bhool Bhulaiyaa" from Bhool Bhulaiyaa, which proved to be the breakthrough for Shridhar. The song starring Akshay Kumar, was the biggest hit of the year and was nominated for the Filmfare Awards, along with the songs "Ticket To Hollywood" and "Heyy Baby." Shridhar also co-wrote the song "Bhool Bhulaiyaa" with Sameer.

=== 2008-2009: Success in Bollywood ===
In 2008, Shridhar saw a successful year with most of his songs becoming commercial hits. He sang the songs, "Race Saanson Ki", "Race Is On My Mind" and "Sexy Lady" (Race), "Love Mera Hit", and "Rockin" And Reelin" (Billu), "Vacancy" and "Tha Karke" (Golmaal Returns), "Aai Paapi" (Kismat Konnection), "O Re Lakad" (Krazzy 4), "Nobody Like You" (Mission Istaanbul), "Bas Ek King" and "Talli Hua" (Singh Is Kinng), "Sooni Sooni Raahein" and "Main Ro Na Padoon" (Hum Phir Mile Na Mile), "Samandar" (Mr. Black Mr. White), "Khalbali" and "Bhuri Bhuri" (Khalbali). This year he sang for a number of Bollywood actors, such as Saif Ali Khan, Shah Rukh Khan, Ajay Devgn, and Shahid Kapur. Shridhar sang a Telugu song called "Om Namaste Bolo" from the film Ready, starring Genelia D'Souza. Shridhar wrote and sang the song "Aayaare" for Kolkata Knight Riders- 2 Hot 2 Cool.

Next year, Shridhar further followed with songs like "Chandni Chowk To China" (Chandni Chowk to China), "Pom Pom Pom" (Horn 'Ok' Pleassss), "Pal Yeh Aane Wala Pal" (Dhoondte Reh Jaaoge), "Aaja Mahi" (8 x 10 Tasveer), Prem Ki Naiyya" (Ajab Prem Ki Ghazab Kahani), "You Are My Love" (All the Best: Fun Begins), "Bebo" and "Beautiful Woman" (Do Knot Disturb), "Tension Lene Ka Nahi" (Jugaad), "Jashn Hai Josh Hai" (Kal Kissne Dekha), "Lakh Lakh Nakhre" (Kambakkht Ishq), "Twist", "Chor Bazari", and "Aahun Aahun" (Love Aaj Kal), and "Tum Mile" (Tum Mile).

=== 2010-present: Intermittent work in Bollywood ===
In the year 2010, Shridhar slowed down on working on Bollywood songs, due to his involvement in his own album. Shridhar sang "Mera Jeena Hai Kya" (Aashayein), which was altogether a different kind of song from what he had done in the past. He also sung "Shiri Farhad" (Dulha Mil Gaya), "Pe Pe Pein" (Chance Pe Dance). Another recent song of his is the song "Kya" from the Emraan Hashmi-starrer film Crook: It's Good To Be Bad. Shridhar also sang the songs "Ale" and "Desi Kali" of the film Golmaal 3, and "Ajab Leher" of the film Break Ke Baad, starring Imran Khan and Deepika Padukone.

In 2011, Shridhar sang song like "Rab Sab Se Sona" (F.A.L.T.U), "Character Dheela" (Ready), "Full Volume", "Pyaar Mein" from (Thank You), "Rascals", "Parda Nasheen" from (Rascals), "Jhak Maar Ke" from (Desi Boyz).

He received wide recognition after performing at Hans Raj College Festival, "Confluence 2011" on 4 February 2011.

In 2012, Shridhar sang songs like "Papa Toh Band Bajaye" (Housefull 2), "I'll Do The Talking (Steal The Night)" (Agent Vinod) and "Tumhi Ho Bandhu" (Cocktail).

On 20 December 2012, he performed in Hyderabad during Qualcomm's annual event "Qutumbotsav". On 21 December 2012, he performed in Pune during Cybage's Annual Bash at Magarpatta city. On 8 February 2014, he performed in Noida during Amity University's annual fest AYF.

== Personal life ==
Shridhar is married to Nikila Shridhar and has one son, Nevan and one daughter, Rohini.

== Awards and nominations ==
- Nominated: Screen Award for Best Playback Singer – Male (2010): "Tum Mile"
- Nominated: Stardust Award for New Musical Sensation – Male (2008): "Ticket To Hollywood"
- Nominated: Stardust Award for New Musical Sensation – Male (2008): "Bhool Bhulaiyaa"
- Nominated: IIFA Award for Best Male Playback Singer (2008): "Bhool Bhulaiyaa"

== Works ==
=== Lyricist ===
- Golmaal Returns (2008)
- Billu (2009)
- De Dana Dan (2009)
- 8 x 10 Tasveer (2009)

=== As composer ===
- 8 x 10 Tasveer (2009)
- Irada (2017)

=== Bombay Vikings discography and studio albums ===
- U n I (2011)
- Zara Nazron Se Kehdo (2006)
- Chhodh Do Aanchal (2004)
- Hum To Anything Karega - Fusion Remixes (2004)
- The Best of Bombay Vikings (2003)
- Hawa Mein Udati Jaaye (2002)
- Woh Chali (2001)
- Kya Soorat Hai (1999)

=== Playback singer ===
Denotes films that have not yet been released

Year	Film	Song	Music	Lyrics	Co-singer(s)	Note
2003	Rules: Pyaar Ka Superhit Formula	"Pyaar Ke Naam Pe"	Vanraj Bhatia	Subhrat Sinha		
2005	U, Bomsi n Me	"Kahan Ho Tum (Album Version)"	Deepak Pandit	Himself		
2006	Bhagam Bhag	"Bhagam Bhag"	Pritam	Sameer		
2006	Bhagam Bhag	"Bhagam Bhag" (Press Play Mix)	Pritam	Sameer		
2006	Bhagam Bhag	"Bhagam Bhag" (Ragga Mix)	Pritam	Sameer		
2007	Honeymoon Travels Pvt. Ltd.	"Halke Halke Rang Chhalkein"	Vishal–Shekhar	Javed Akhtar		
2007	Honeymoon Travels Pvt. Ltd.	"Halke Halke - Remix"	Vishal–Shekhar	Javed Akhtar		
2007	Just Married	"Baat Pakki" (Version I)	Pritam	Gulzar	Shaan	
2007	Jhoom Barabar Jhoom	"Ticket to Hollywood"	Shankar–Ehsaan–Loy	Gulzar	Alisha Chinai	
2007	Heyy Babyy	"Heyy Babyy"	Shankar–Ehsaan–Loy	Sameer	Pervez Quadri, Raman Mahadevan	
2007	Heyy Babyy	"Heyy Babyy" (The Big 'O' Remix)	Shankar–Ehsaan–Loy	Sameer	Pervez Quadri, Raman Mahadevan, Loy Mendonsa	
2007	Bhool Bhulaiyaa	"Bhool Bhulaiyaa"	Pritam	Sameer		
2007	Bhool Bhulaiyaa	"Bhool Bhulaiyaa – Remix"	Pritam	Sameer		
2007	Dhan Dhana Dhan Goal	"Ishq Ka Kalma"	Pritam	Javed Akhtar		
2008	Race	"Khwab Dekhe (Sexy Lady)"	Pritam	Sameer	Pritam, Monali Thakur	
2008	Race	"Race Saanson Ki"	Pritam	Sameer	Sunidhi Chauhan	
2008	Race	"Race Is on My Mind"	Pritam	Sameer	Sunidhi Chauhan	
2008	Race	"Race Saanson Ki" - Remix	Pritam	Sameer	Sunidhi Chauhan	
2008	Race	"Race Is on My Mind" - Remix	Pritam	Sameer	Sunidhi Chauhan	
2008	Krazzy 4	"O Re Lakad"	Rajesh Roshan	Javed Akhtar	Kailash Kher, Sowmya Raoh	
2008	Mr. Black Mr. White	"Samandar"	Tauseef Akhtar	Sameer	Suzanne D'Mello, Sweta Mohanty	
2008	Mr. Black Mr. White	"Samandar - Remix"	Tauseef Akhtar	Sameer	Suzanne D'Mello	
2008	Mere Baap Pehle Aap	"Ishq Subhan Allah"	Tauseef Akhtar	Sameer	Alisha Chinai, Rap by Bob	
2008	Mere Baap Pehle Aap	"Ishq Subhan Allah (Remix)"	Tauseef Akhtar	Sameer	Alisha Chinai, Rap by Bob	
2008	Kismat Konnection	"Aai Paapi"	Pritam	Shabbir Ahmed		
2008	Kismat Konnection	"Aai Paapi (Remix)"	Pritam	Shabbir Ahmed		
2008	Mission Istaanbul	"Nobody Like You"	Chirrantan Bhatt	Hamza Farouqi	Anoushka, Ishq Bector	
2008	Mission Istaanbul	"Nobody Like You (Remix)"	Chirrantan Bhatt	Hamza Farouqi	Anoushka, Ishq Bector	
2008	Singh Is Kinng	"Bas Ek Kinng"	Pritam	Mayur Puri	Mika Singh, Hard Kaur, Aashish Pandit	
2008	Singh Is Kinng	"Bas Ek Kinng" (Tiger Style Mix)	Pritam	Mayur Puri	Mika Singh, Hard Kaur, Aashish Pandit	
2008	Singh Is Kinng	"Talli Hua"	Pritam	Mayur Puri	Labh Janjua	
2008	Singh Is Kinng	"Talli Hua" (Jay Dabhi Mix)	Pritam	Mayur Puri	Labh Janjua, Style Bhai	
2008	Khallballi!	"Khallballi Hai Khallballi"	Sajid–Wajid	Jalees Sherwani	Wajid	
2008	Khallballi!	"Khallballi" (Remix)	Sajid–Wajid	Jalees Sherwani	Wajid	
2008	Khallballi!	"Bhuri Bhuri Teri Aankhein"	Sajid–Wajid	Jalees Sherwani	Sunidhi Chauhan	
2008	Khallballi!	"Bhuri Bhuri" (Remix)	Sajid–Wajid	Jalees Sherwani	Sunidhi Chauhan	
2008	God Tussi Great Ho	"Tumko Dekha"	Sajid–Wajid	Jalees Sherwani	Shreya Ghoshal	
2008	Golmaal Returns	"Tha Kar Ke"	Pritam	Sameer	Anweshaa, Akriti Kakar, Earl D'Souza, Indie	
2008	Golmaal Returns	"Tha Kar Ke" (Remix)	Pritam	Sameer	Anweshaa, Akriti Kakar, Earl D'Souza, Indie	
2008	Golmaal Returns	"Vacancy"	Pritam	Sameer	Benny Dayal, Suhail Kaul, Suzanne D'Mello	
2008	Golmaal Returns	"Vacancy" (Kilogram Mix)	Pritam	Sameer	Benny Dayal, Suhail Kaul, Suzanne D'Mello	
2008	Meerabai Not Out	"Meerabai Not Out"	Sandesh Shandilya	Irfan Siddiqui	Vijay Prakash	
2009	Horn 'Ok' Pleassss	"Pom Pom Pom"	Amar Mohile	Sajid-Farhad		
2009	Chandni Chowk to China	"Chandni Chowk to China"	Shankar–Ehsaan–Loy	Rajat Arora	Anushka Manchanda, Shankar Mahadevan	
2009	Raaz: The Mystery Continues	"Soniyo"	Raju Singh	Kumaar	Sonu Nigam, Zubeen Garg, Shreya Ghoshal	
2009	Billu	"Love Mera Hit Hit"	Pritam	Ashish Pandit, Mayur Puri	Tulsi Kumar	
2009	Billu	"Love Mera Hit Hit" (House Mix)	Pritam	Ashish Pandit, Mayur Puri	Tulsi Kumar	
2009	Billu	"Love Mera Hit Hit (Remix)"	Pritam	Ashish Pandit, Mayur Puri	Tulsi Kumar	
2009	Billu	"You Get Me Rocking & Reeling"	Pritam	Sayeed Quadri	Dominique Cerejo	
2009	Billu	"You Get Me Rocking & Reeling (Video Edit)"	Pritam	Sayeed Quadri	Dominique Cerejo	
2009	Billu	"You Get Me Rocking & Reeling (Remix)"	Pritam	Sayeed Quadri	Dominique Cerejo	
2009	Jugaad	"Tu Hai Rab Mera"	Sachin Gupta	Sameer		
2009	Dhoondte Reh Jaaoge	"Pal Yeh Aane Wala Pal"	Sajid–Wajid	Shabbir Ahmed		
2009	8 x 10 Tasveer	"Aaja Mahi"	Himself	Sameer	Tulsi Kumar	
2009	8 x 10 Tasveer	"Aaja Mahi (Remix)"	Himself	Sameer	Tulsi Kumar	
2009	Kal Kissne Dekha	"Jashn Hai"	Sajid–Wajid	Sameer	Alisha Chinai, Wajid	
2009	Kambakkht Ishq	"Lakh Lakh"	Anu Malik	Anvita Dutt Guptan		
2009	Love Aaj Kal	"Twist"	Pritam	Irshad Kamil	Suzanne D'Mello, Saif Ali Khan (additional vocals)	
2009	Love Aaj Kal	"Twist (Remix)"	Pritam	Irshad Kamil		
2009	Love Aaj Kal	"Chor Bazaari"	Pritam	Irshad Kamil	Sunidhi Chauhan	
2009	Love Aaj Kal	"Chor Bazaari (Remix)"	Pritam	Irshad Kamil	Sunidhi Chauhan	
2009	Love Aaj Kal	"Aahun Aahun"	Pritam	Irshad Kamil	Master Saleem, Suzanne D'Mello	
2009	Love Aaj Kal	"Aahun Aahun (Remix)"	Pritam	Irshad Kamil	Master Saleem, Suzanne D'Mello	
2009	Do Knot Disturb	"O Meri Bebo, O Aaja Bebo"	Nadeem–Shravan	Sameer	Anushka Manchanda	
2009	Do Knot Disturb	"She Is A Beautiful Woman"	Nadeem–Shravan	Sameer	Sowmya Raoh	
2009	All the Best: Fun Begins	"You Are My Love"	Pritam	Kumaar	Kunal Ganjawala, Alisha Chinai, Rajesh, Antara Mali	
2009	Bal Ganesh 2	"De Taali - Remix"	Shamir Tandon, Sanjay Dhakan	Shabbir Ahmed, Vibha Singh, Rajendra Mehra	Neha Kakkar, Sonu Kakkar	
2009	Ajab Prem Ki Ghazab Kahani	"Prem Ki Naiyya"	Pritam	Irshad Kamil	Suzanne D'Mello	
2009	Ajab Prem Ki Ghazab Kahani	"Prem Ki Naiyya (Remix)"	Pritam	Irshad Kamil	Suzanne D'Mello	
2009	Tum Mile	"Tum Mile"	Pritam	Kumaar		
2010	Dulha Mil Gaya	"Shirin Farhad"	Lalit Pandit	Kumaar	Tulsi Kumar	
2010	Chance Pe Dance	"Pe... Pe... Pepein...."	Pritam	Kumaar	Master Saleem, Hard Kaur	
2010	Chance Pe Dance	"Pe... Pe... Pepein...." (Duet)	Pritam	Kumaar	Master Saleem, Hard Kaur, Tulsi Kumar	
2010	Bhavnao Ko Samjho	"Bhavnao Ko Samjho"	Tinu	Sunil Pal		
2010	Pyaar Kaa Fundaa	"Pyaar Kaa Fundaa"	Hriju Roy	Varshaa Jain		
2010	Na Ghar Ke Na Ghaat Ke	"Agar Hum Tum Ko"	Lalit Pandit	Mudassar Aziz	Lalit Pandit, Shreya Ghoshal	
2010	Na Ghar Ke Na Ghaat Ke	"Agar Hum Tum Ko" (Remix)	Lalit Pandit	Mudassar Aziz	Lalit Pandit, Shreya Ghoshal	
2010	Housefull	"Papa Jaag Jayega"	Shankar–Ehsaan–Loy	Amitabh Bhattacharya	Ritu Pathak, Alyssa Mendonsa	
2010	Housefull	"Papa Jaag Jayega" (Insane Insomaniac Mix)	Shankar–Ehsaan–Loy	Amitabh Bhattacharya	Ritu Pathak, Alyssa Mendonsa	
2010	Aashayein	"Mera Jeena Hai Kya"	Pritam	Mir Ali Hussain		
2010	Aashayein	"Mera Jeena Hai Kya" (Remix)	Pritam	Mir Ali Hussain		
2010	Crook	"Kya"	Pritam	Kumaar	Dominique Cerejo	
2010	Golmaal 3	"Ale"	Pritam	Kumaar	Antara Mitra	
2010	Golmaal 3	"Desi Kali"	Pritam	Kumaar	Sunidhi Chauhan	
2010	Golmaal 3	"Desi Kali" (Remix)	Pritam	Kumaar	Sunidhi Chauhan	
2010	Break Ke Baad	"Ajab Leher"	Vishal–Shekhar	Prasoon Joshi	Vishal Dadlani	
2011	Mumbai Mast Kallander	"Sloshed" (Duet)	Teenu Arora	Prashant Ingole	Saru Maini	
2011	Mumbai Mast Kallander	"Ram Naam Bhaj Le"	Teenu Arora	Pancchi Jalonvi		
2011	United Six	"You Are The Reason"	Pritam	Ashish Pandit	Ritu Pathak	
2011	Angel	"Tell Me Why"	Amjad Nadeem	Shabbir Ahmed		
2011	F.A.L.T.U	"Rab Sab Se Sona"	Sachin–Jigar	Sameer	Apeksha Dandekar	
2011	F.A.L.T.U	"Beh Chala"	Sachin–Jigar	Sameer		
2011	Thank You	"Full Volume"	Pritam	Kumaar	Richa Sharma, Suzanne D'Mello	
2011	Thank You	"Full Volume" (Remix)	Pritam	Kumaar	Richa Sharma	
2011	Thank You	"Pyaar Mein"	Pritam	Amitabh Bhattacharya	Javed Ali	
2011	Chalo Dilli	"Hi 5"	Sachin Gupta	Krishika Lulla, Shabbir Ahmed		
2011	Chalo Dilli	"Hi 5" (Club Mix)	Sachin Gupta	Krishika Lulla, Shabbir Ahmed		
2011	Love U...Mr. Kalakaar!	"Sarphira Sa Hai Dil"	Sandesh Shandilya	Manoj Muntashir	Shreya Ghoshal	
2011	Ready	"Character Dheela"	Pritam	Amitabh Bhattacharya	Amrita Kak	
2011	Ready	"Character Dheela" (DJ A-MYTH Remix)	Pritam	Amitabh Bhattacharya	Amrita Kak	
2011	Love Express	"Dance Like Punjabi"	Jaidev Kumar	Rakesh Kumar	Sumitra Iyer	
2011	Rascals	"Rascals"	Vishal–Shekhar	Irshad Kamil		
2011	Rascals	"Parda Nasheen"	Vishal–Shekhar	Irshad Kamil	Sunidhi Chauhan	
2011	Rascals	"Rascals" (Dance Mix)	Vishal–Shekhar	Irshad Kamil	Vishal Dadlani	
2011	Desi Boyz	"Jhak Maar Ke"	Pritam	Irshad Kamil	Harshdeep Kaur	
2011	Desi Boyz	"Jhak Maar Ke" (Remix)	Pritam	Irshad Kamil	Harshdeep Kaur	
2011	Jo Hum Chahein	"One More One More"	Sachin Gupta	Kumaar	Sunidhi Chauhan	
2011	Yaar Anmulle	"Desi Dude"	Gurmeet Singh	Kumaar		Punjabi
2011	Yaar Anmulle	"Desi Dude" (Remix)	Gurmeet Singh	Kumaar		Punjabi
2012	Housefull 2	"Papa Toh Band Bajaye"	Sajid–Wajid	Sameer		
2012	Agent Vinod	"I'll Do The Talking Tonight"	Pritam	Amitabh Bhattacharya	Shefali Alvares, Aditi Singh Sharma, Barbie Amod	
2012	Agent Vinod	"I'll Do The Talking Tonight" (Remix)	Pritam	Amitabh Bhattacharya	Aditi Singh Sharma, Barbie Amod	
2012	Cocktail	"Tumhi Ho Bandhu"	Pritam	Irshad Kamil	Kavita Seth	
2012	Cocktail	"Daaru Desi"	Pritam	Irshad Kamil	Benny Dayal, Shalmali Kholgade	
2013	Krrish 3	"Raghupati Raghav"	Rajesh Roshan	Sameer	Monali Thakur, Bob	
2013	Krrish 3	"Raghupati Raghav" (DJ Shiva Remix)	Rajesh Roshan	Sameer	Monali Thakur, Bob	
2014	Humshakals	"Caller Tune"	Himesh Reshammiya	Sameer	Neeti Mohan	
2014	Bobby Jasoos	"B.O.B.B.Y"	Shantanu Moitra	Swanand Kirkire	Shreya Ghoshal	
2015	Prem Ratan Dhan Payo	"Tod Tadaiyya"	Himesh Reshammiya	Irshad Kamil	Neeti Mohan	
2015	Romance Complicated	"All in One Gujrati"	Jatin Pratik	Isha Gautam & Dasharath Mewal	Priya Patidar	Gujrati
2015	Bangistan	"Saturday Night"	Ram Sampath	Puneet Krishna	Aditi Singh Sharma, Benny Dayal, Janusz Krucinski	
2016	Junooniyat	"Nachenge Saari Raat"	Meet Bros	Kumaar, Taz, Hunterz	Tulsi Kumar	
2017	Golmaal Again	"Maine Tujhko Dekha"	Amaal Mallik	Kumaar	Sukriti Kakar	
2018	Jole Jongole	"Premer Infection (Dil Ki Kite)"	Jeet Gannguli	Rana Mazumder	Aditi Singh Sharma	Bengali
2018	Kaashi in Search of Ganga	"Ranjha"	DJ Emenes	Shabbir Ahmed	Payal Dev	
2022	Bhool Bhulaiyaa 2	"Bhool Bhulaiyaa 2 - Title Track"	Pritam, Tanishk Bagchi	Sameer (Additional lyrics by Mandy Gill)	MellowD, Bob (rap)	
2023	Shehzada	"Character Dheela 2.0"	Pritam, Abhijit Vaghani	Amitabh Bhattacharya, Ashish Pandit	Style Bai (rap)	
2024	Bhool Bhulaiyaa 3	"Bhool Bhulaiyaa 3 - Title Track"	Pritam, Tanishk Bagchi	Sameer Anjaan (Additional lyrics by Dhruv Yogi; English verse by Pitbull)	Diljit Dosanjh, Pitbull	
2025	Bhool Chuk Maaf	"Chor Bazari Phir Se"	Pritam, Tanishk Bagchi	Irshad Kamil	Sunidhi Chauhan, Zahrah S Khan, Pravesh	
2025	Housefull 5	"Qayamat"	White Noise Collectives	SOM	Shruti Dhasmana	
2025	Housefull 5	"Housefull 5 Mixtape"	Shankar–Ehsaan–Loy, Sajid–Wajid, Julius Packiam	Amitabh Bhattacharya, Sameer Anjaan	Ritu Pathak, Alyssa Mendonsa, Tarun Sagar, Loy Mendonsa, Wajid Khan, Sunidhi Chauhan, Suzanne D'Mello	
2025	Andaaz 2	"Ishq Junooni Hai"	Nadeem Saifi	Sameer Anjaan		
2026	Cocktail 2	"Bandhu 2.0"	Pritam	Irshad Kamil	Kavita Seth	
2026	Dhamaal 4	"Paisa Lao"	Tanishk Bagchi, Param Raj	Kumaar		
