= Aaj Ka Goonda Raaj =

- Promotional poster
- Directed by: Ravi Raja Pinisetty
- Written by: Anees Bazmee
- Based on: Gang Leader (Telugu)
- Produced by: N. N. Sippy
- Starring: Chiranjeevi; Meenakshi Sheshadri; Raj Babbar
- Cinematography: P. S. Prakash
- Edited by: Vellaiswamy
- Music by: Anand-Milind
- Release date: 10 July 1992
- Country: India
- Language: Hindi

Aaj Ka Goonda Raaj (transl. Today's rule of the Ruffians) is a 1992 India Hindi-language action crime film starring Chiranjeevi, Meenakshi Sheshadri in lead roles. It is a remake of the 1991 Telugu film Gang Leader, also starring Chiranjeevi, in his second film in Bollywood following Pratibandh. The film explores the concepts of exploitation by anti-social elements and the impact of crowd psychology.

== Plot ==
Raja is portrayed as educated, righteous, honest, challenging, and a daredevil who is unemployed. With no work, he spends his time with his four friends. This upsets his grandmother and elder brothers Amar and Ravi, who worry about him.

Troubled by a lack of money, the family has many problems. Ravi's pending IAS examination requires money they do not have. To raise money, Raja and his friends take a job getting rid of Shalu, a tenant who has illegally settled in a house. Raja has an easy time getting rid of Shalu. But from then on, Shalu creates hell for him and moves into his house and life permanently.

Tejpal and Nagpal are power brokers. They succeed in getting Ritu married to Ravi, now an IAS officer, who is about to become a collector. The villains think this is a perfect strategy: Saxena's sister is married to Raja's brother. Raja revolts but is cornered. He has many clashes with the duo. In one of these clashes, Raja's friends and eldest brother Amar are murdered. All is lost until Raja and Ravi discover the truth about Tejpal and Nagpal. Raja and Ravi decide to end the Gundaraj.

== Cast ==
- Chiranjeevi as Raja
- Meenakshi Sheshadri as Shalu
- Raj Babbar as Ravi
- Parikshit Sahni as Amar
- Prem Chopra as Tejpal
- Sharat Saxena as Nagpal
- Dalip Tahil as SP Shivendranath Saxena
- Tinu Anand as Home Minister Shanti Prasad Danga
- Satish Shah as Jailor
- Geetha as Ritu
- Sudha as Aarti
- Dina Pathak as Raja, Ravi & Amar's Grandmother
- Rakesh Bedi as Govind Ahuja "Guddu"
- Ravi Teja as Raja's Friend
- Dinesh Kaushik as Raja's Friend
- Dan Dhanoa as Corrupt Police Inspector
- Kunickaa Sadanand as Chanda
- Anees Bazmee as Journalist Anees

== Production ==
While working on the film, Sharat Saxena endured an injury that disengaged his left arm after a fall.

== Soundtrack ==
The album featured hit songs composed by Anand–Milind and written by Sameer. According to the Indian trade website Box Office India, with around 1,500,000 units sold the soundtrack became the twelfth highest-grossing album of the year.

#	Song	Singer
1.	"Tota Mera Tota"	Abhijeet, Sadhana Sargam
2.	"Lashkara Lashkara"	Kumar Sanu, Alka Yagnik
3.	"Pehle Bhi Roz"	Abhijeet, Sadhana Sargam
4.	"Ek Pappi Dede Mujhe"	Abhijeet, Sadhana Sargam
5.	"Tum Mujhe Achche"	Abhijeet, Alka Yagnik
6.	"It's A Challenge"	Amit Kumar
