= Naaz (singer) =

Dutch-Kurdish singer (born 1998)

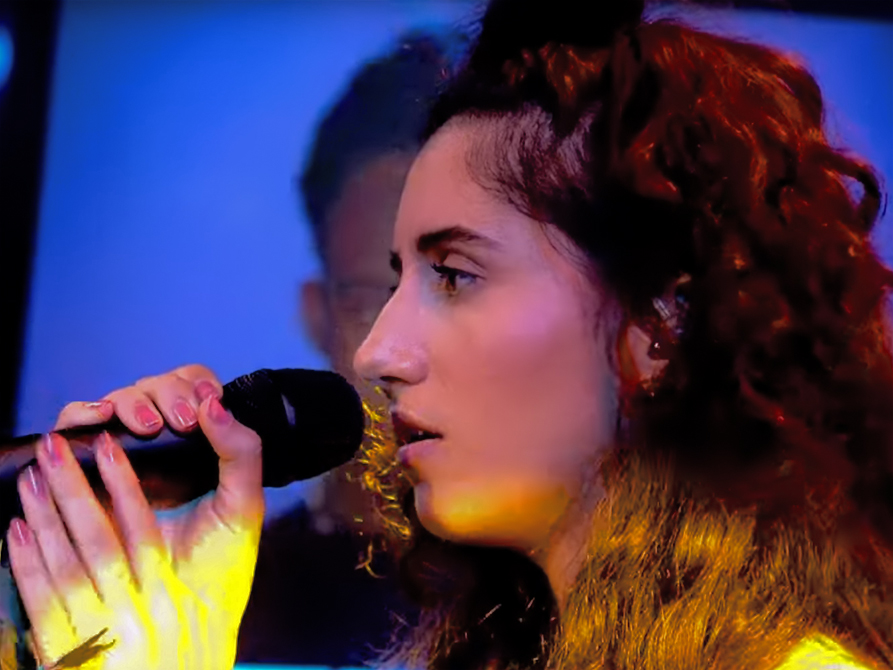
- Naaz performing in 2017

Background information
- Born: Naaz Mohammad; 8 June 1998 (age 28); Gorinchem, Netherlands
- Occupation: Singer
- Years active: 2015–present

Naaz Mohammed (born 8 June 1998), known mononymously as Naaz, is a Dutch-Kurdish singer. Born and raised in the Netherlands, she initially gained media attention after she auditioned for Holland's Got Talent in 2014.

== Early life ==
Naaz Mohammed was born on 8 June 1998, in Gorinchem. At age two, she moved to Rotterdam. Her parents fled Iraqi Kurdistan during the Gulf War; Naaz's father is a doctor, and her mother is his assistant. She was bullied in school but found comfort in the words of one of her teachers. A car accident in which her parents were wounded was a turning point in her life and that of her parents; before, music was a "no-go" for them and she had to abide by a strict dress code, but after the accident, the family was more open with and accepting of each other.

== Career ==
=== 2014-2018: Career beginnings, Bits of Naaz ===
On 13 November 2015, Naaz featured in Yellow Claw and Flux Pavilion's song, "Catch Me". On 30 September 2016, she released her first solo song, "Sadboy". Naaz created the songs on Bits of Naaz in her room, using a computer, a microphone, and a keyboard. She recorded most of the songs in the EP in December 2017. At the time, she wasn't allowed to go to the studio because her parents did not want her to take a career in music. Naaz later found a manager who persuaded her parents to let her continue a career as a musician. On 18 May 2017, Naaz released her debut single, "Words". A music video was released to accompany the song on June 8. On 18 August 2017, Naaz released her second single, "Can't". A music video for the song came out a week later. On 13 October 2017, she released her third single, "Up to Something". On 25 October 2017, Naaz performed "Words" on Vevo DSCVR. On 12 February 2018, Naaz released her fourth single, "Loving Love". The single entered the Dutch Singles Tip and peaked at #30.

On 30 April 2018, Naaz released her debut EP, Bits of Naaz. Bits of Naaz debuted and peaked at #81 in the Netherlands, and its success led to her to play at Rock Werchter and various European countries; she received two Edison Awards for the EP. Naaz joined Hayley Kiyoko on her European Encore Tour.

=== 2019-present: The Beautiful Struggle and Never Have I Ever ===
Naaz continues to make waves in the music industry with her compelling storytelling and poignant lyricism. Her latest era marks a significant evolution in her artistic journey, showcasing her unique voice and the diverse influences that shape her music. On 14 June 2019, Naaz released the first single, "Taped", for her second EP, the beautiful struggle, and the second single, "damage", in September 2019, which she said was a song about "emotionally damaged DNA". On 27 September 2019, Naaz released the song "it's not you it's me". On 4 October 2019, Naaz released her sophomore EP, the beautiful struggle.

Naaz joined Melanie Martinez on her K-12 tour in 2020. She went on her own headline tour promote her EP. On 10 July 2020, Naaz released the single "Mute Love". On 31 May 2022, Naaz released the single "Sad Violins", her first in two years.

In January 2023, Naaz released her highly anticipated album Never Have I Ever, which dives deep into her experiences as a Kurdish-Dutch woman. The album has been celebrated for its raw vulnerability, with two singles released: "Azadi" and "Daughter." "Azadi," meaning "freedom" in Kurdish, explores themes of liberation and identity, while "Daughter" reflects on the complexities of familial relationships, offering an intimate glimpse into her personal life.

In 2023, Naaz released two non-album singles: "Banara" and "Uproot." The latter addresses the harrowing realities faced by victims of domestic abuse and sex work. In the fall of 2024, Naaz continued her artistic journey with the release of her new single, "Sirens."

== Awards and nominations ==
Naaz has won two Edison Awards, a Dutch music award, and was nominated in two categories of the XITE Awards in 2017.

In January 2020, Naaz won two awards at the Music Moves Europe Talent Awards, a music awards ceremony funded by the European Union. Award winners received prizes of €10,000, with an additional €5,000 for the Public Choice award, which Naaz won.

== Discography ==
=== Studio albums ===
Title	Details	Peak chart positions
Title	Details	NL
Never Have I Ever	Released: 11 January 2023; Label: Bits of Naaz; Formats: streaming, digital download	—

=== Extended plays ===
Title	Details	Peak chart positions
Title	Details	NL
Bits of Naaz	Released: 20 April 2018; Label: Top Notch Music BV; Formats: streaming, digital download	82
The Beautiful Struggle	Released: 4 October 2019; Label: Top Notch Music BV; Formats: streaming, digital download	—

=== Singles ===
==== As lead artist ====
List of singles, with selected chart positions
Title	Year	Peak chart positions	Album
Title	Year	NLD Tip	Album
"Sadboy"	2016	—	Non-album single
"Words"	2017	10	Bits of Naaz
"Can't"	2017	—	Bits of Naaz
"Up to Something"	2017	9	Bits of Naaz
"Loving Love"	2018	11	Bits of Naaz
"Taped"	2019	—	The Beautiful Struggle
"Damage"	2019	—	The Beautiful Struggle
"It's Not You It's Me	2019	—	The Beautiful Struggle
"Mute Love"	2020	—	Non-album single
"Sad Violins"	2022	—	Never Have I Ever
"Azadî"	2022	—	Never Have I Ever
"Daughter"	2022	—	Never Have I Ever
"Barana"	2023	—	Non-album singles
"Uproot"	2023	—	Non-album singles
"Sirens"	2024	—	TBA
"—" denotes a single that did not chart or was not released in that territory.

==== Other charted songs ====
List of other charted songs, with selected chart positions
Title	Year	Peak chart positions	Album
Title	Year	NLD Tip	Album
"As Fun"	2018	13	Bits of Naaz

== Artistry ==
Naaz has listed Linkin Park, Lorde, and Tove Lo as musical inspirations.
