= Aakash Kaushik =

Indian screenwriter

- Born: Delhi, India
- Education: FTII, Pune
- Occupations: Screenwriter; film director
- Years active: 2007–present
- Spouse: Neha Tyagi Kaushik

Aakash Kaushik is an Indian screenwriter and director who predominantly works in Hindi films. He began his career as a writer with F.A.L.T.U (2011).

== Early life ==
Kaushik was born in Delhi, India. He studied filmmaking at Film and Television Institute of India, Pune.

== Filmography ==
Key
†	Denotes films that have not yet been released

Year	Title	Director	Writer	Notes
2007	Partition	No	No	Credited as production trainee
2011	F.A.L.T.U	No	Dialogue	
2012	Jodi Breakers	No	Yes	
2013	Rabba Main Kya Karoon	No	Yes	
2016	Great Grand Masti	No	Yes	
2016	A Flying Jatt	No	Additional	
2019	Housefull 4	No	Yes	
2022	Bhool Bhulaiyaa 2	No	Yes	
2022	Thank God	No	Yes	
2024	Bhool Bhulaiyaa 3	No	Yes	
2026	Bhooth Bangla	No	Story	
2026	Udta Teer	Yes	Yes	Directorial debut

== Accolades ==
Year	Award	Category	For	Result	Ref.
2023	Filmfare Awards	Best Screenplay	Bhool Bhulaiyaa 2	Nominated	
2025	Filmfare Awards	Best Story	Bhool Bhulaiyaa 3	Nominated	
