= Bhool Bhulaiyaa =

2007 Indian film by Priyadarshan

- Theatrical release poster
- Directed by: Priyadarshan
- Screenplay by: Neeraj Vora
- Dialogues by: Manisha Korde; Yashwant Mahilwar
- Story by: Madhu Muttam
- Based on: Manichitrathazhu by Fazil
- Produced by: Bhushan Kumar; Krishan Kumar
- Starring: Akshay Kumar; Vidya Balan; Shiney Ahuja; Ameesha Patel; Paresh Rawal; Manoj Joshi; Asrani; Rajpal Yadav
- Cinematography: Tirru
- Edited by: N. Gopalakrishnan; Arun Kumar Aravind
- Music by: Songs: Pritam; Score: Ranjit Barot
- Production company: T-Series Films
- Distributed by: Balaji Motion Pictures; Eros International
- Release date: 12 October 2007 (India)
- Running time: 154 minutes
- Country: India
- Language: Hindi
- Budget: ₹32 crore
- Box office: ₹82.35 crore

Bhool Bhulaiyaa (transl. Labyrinth) is a 2007 Indian Hindi-language psychological horror comedy film directed by Priyadarshan from a screenplay by Neeraj Vora and produced by T Series. It is a remake of the 1993 Malayalam-language film Manichitrathazhu written by Madhu Muttam and directed by Fazil, which is based on a 19th-century tragedy that happened at Madhu's Alummoottil tharavad (an old traditional mansion) in Muttom (near Haripad) in central Travancore. The film stars Akshay Kumar, Vidya Balan, Shiney Ahuja, and Ameesha Patel, alongside Paresh Rawal, Rajpal Yadav, Manoj Joshi, Asrani, and Vikram Gokhale. The film score and soundtrack were composed by Ranjit Barot and Pritam respectively, with lyrics written by Sameer and Sayeed Quadri.

The film was shot under the working title of Chandramukhi in Jaipur, mainly at the Chomu Palace (a haveli) and also the City Palace, while the song "Allah Hafiz" was shot at Hampi. Madhu, the writer of the Malayalam film, has been credited as the sole writer for the remakes after he filed a copyright suit against Fazil when the latter started being listed as the writer of the original script in the remakes.

Produced on a budget of ₹32 crore, Bhool Bhulaiyaa earned ₹82.84 crore, thus becoming the eighth-highest grossing Hindi film of 2007. It received mixed reviews from critics but has attained cult status, with praise towards Kumar's psychiatrist character, Balan's portrayal of Avni and Manjulika, and the film's music. The film spawned a standalone sequel titled Bhool Bhulaiyaa 2 (2022) with a new principal cast and only Yadav returning in a reboot of his role. The third film in the series, Bhool Bhulaiyaa 3, with Vidya playing an alternate version of her character and Yadav again rebooting his character, released on Diwali 2024.

== Plot ==
Badrinarayan "Badri" Chaturvedi heads a former royal family of Varanasi whose ancestral palace is believed to be haunted by the ghost of Manjulika, a Bengali classical dancer. Siddharth, son of Badri's elder brother, Kedar, and the current successor of the royal dynasty, and his archeologist wife Avni return to the palace from the United States after a whirlwind romance. Their marriage breaks the heart of Siddharth's childhood friend and Badri's adopted daughter, Radha, who was and is in love with him.

Avni develops an interest in the legend of Manjulika. Decades ago, the Chaturvedis' ancestor, Maharaja Vibhuti Narayan, was infatuated with Manjulika, who was a dancer in his court from Bengal. However, she loved Shashidhar, who was her co-dancer. Angry and frustrated, the king publicly beheaded Shashidhar on the night of Durgashtami and imprisoned Manjulika in order to forcibly marry her. A heartbroken Manjulika swore vengeance towards any successor of the royal family before hanging herself. The king mysteriously died, and powerful sorcerers and high priests were summoned to seal away Manjulika's spirit on the third floor of the palace. Avni gets a duplicate key from Batukshankar's daughter, Nandini, and opens the door on the third floor, thereby breaking the confinement of Manjulika's spirit. As a result, unnatural events start taking place thereafter, including an apparition of a woman that frightens everyone in the palace. Suspicion falls on Radha, who is somehow always at the scene of every incident.

Siddharth suspects Radha has become mentally unstable after her heartbreak. He brings his friend, psychiatrist Aditya Shrivastava, to treat her. Aditya's unconventional ways lead the household to think he is a fool. An attempt to kill Siddharth by poisoning his tea is foiled by Aditya. One night, Aditya hears the sound of a ghungroo and a voice singing in Bengali coming from Manjulika's room. Posing as King Vibhuti Narayan, he converses with Manjulika, who vows revenge on the next Durgashtami.

During the engagement of Nandini to poet Sharad Pradhan, Avni accuses Sharad of sexually harassing her. Sharad vehemently denies this, and Aditya explains to an angry Siddharth that he is telling the truth. In reality, Avni has dissociative identity disorder and associates herself with Manjulika. Aditya had become suspicious after Avni's behavior and visited her hometown to gather information about her. She associates Siddharth with the evil King Vibhuti Narayan and believes Sharad to be Shashidhar, for he resides in the house Shashidhar used to live in.

Badri brings renowned exorcist Yagyaprakash Bharti. To everyone's surprise, Aditya was Yagyaprakash's disciple a long time ago. Aditya intends to cure Avni using an unconventional method of psychiatry. Siddharth believes Aditya after witnessing Avni transition to Manjulika. Aditya explains that DID is a lifelong condition, but Avni might be cured if they satisfy Manjulika's purpose for existing: killing King Vibhuti Narayan.

On Durgashtami, everyone witnesses Avni assume Manjulika's identity, dressed as her and dancing to Manjulika and Shashidhar's song. Yagyaprakash makes Manjulika promise to leave if she kills the King. She envisions Siddharth as the King, and Yagyaprakash and Aditya trick her into thinking she is killing him when in fact she is beheading a dummy. Avni is cured after the orchestrated "murder", believing Manjulika has taken her revenge.

The family, now pleased with Aditya, thank him for his help. Aditya, who has come to like Radha, tells her that he will send his parents if she is interested in marrying him.

== Cast ==
- Akshay Kumar as Dr. Aditya "Adi" Shrivastav, psychiatrist
- Vidya Balan in dual roles as Avni S. Chaturvedi and Manjulika
  - Navika Kotia as Child Avni
- Shiney Ahuja in dual roles as Siddharth Chaturvedi and Raja Vibhuti Narayan
- Ameesha Patel as Radha Chaturvedi
- Paresh Rawal as Batukshankar Upadhyay
- Manoj Joshi as Badrinarayan "Badri" Chaturvedi
- Rajpal Yadav as Chhote Pandit
- Asrani as Murari
- Vikram Gokhale as Acharya Yagyaprakash Bharti
- Rasika Joshi as Janki Batukshankar Upadhyay (née Chaturvedi)
- Tarina Patel as Nandini Sharad Prahlad (née Upadhyay)
- Vineeth in dual roles as Professor Sharad Prahlad and Shashidhar
- Kaveri Jha as Girja Upadhyay
- Jimit Trivedi as Chandu Chaturvedi
- Baby Farida as Avni's Grandmother

== Music ==
=== Score ===
The film score was composed and produced by Ranjit Barot.

=== Songs ===
Bhool Bhulaiyaa

Soundtrack album by Pritam
- Released: 12 July 2007
- Recorded: 2007
- Genre: Feature film soundtrack
- Length: 56:00
- Label: T-Series
- Producer: Pritam

Pritam chronology
Naqaab (2007)	Bhool Bhulaiyaa (2007)	Jab We Met (2007)

Professional ratings
Review scores
Source	Rating
Bollywood Hungama	link
Rediff	link

The songs featured in the film, composed by Pritam, were released in July 2007. The title song "Bhool Bhulaiyaa", commonly known as "Hare Ram Hare Ram, Hare Krishna Hare Ram", was sung by Neeraj Shridhar, who also did the remake for the sequel. The track reportedly samples JtL's "My Lecon". "Labon Ko", another popular song from the album, was sung by KK. According to the Indian trade website Box Office India, with around 12,00,000 units sold, this film's soundtrack album was the year's eighth highest-selling.

All lyrics are written by Sameer and Sayeed Quadri.

Track Listing
No.	Title	Lyrics	Singers	Length
1.	"Bhool Bhulaiyaa"	Sameer	Neeraj Shridhar, Bob	05:12
2.	"Labon Ko Labon Pe"	Sayeed Quadri	K.K.	05:44
3.	"Pyaar Ka Sajda (Not in the film)"	Sameer	K.K.	05:12
4.	"Ami Je Tomar (Mere Dholna)"	Sameer	Shreya Ghoshal, M. G. Sreekumar	06:47
5.	"Let's Rock Soniye"	Sameer	Shaan, Tulsi Kumar	04:27
6.	"Sakiya Re Sakiya"	Sameer	Tulsi Kumar	04:57
7.	"Bhool Bhulaiyaa – Remix"	Sameer	Neeraj Shridhar and Dj A-Myth	05:07
8.	"Allah Hafiz Keh Raha"	Sameer	K.K.	04:34
9.	"Let's Rock Soniye – Remix"	Sameer	Shaan, Tulsi Kumar, and Pritam	04:28
10.	"Pyaar Ka Sajda – Remix"	Sameer	K.K. and DJ Suketu (Arranged by AKS)	05:22
11.	"Labon Ko Labon Pe – Remix"	Sayeed Quadri	K.K., DJ Kiran, DJ G, and Earl	05:17
Total length:				52:65

== Release ==
The film was released worldwide on 12 October 2007. The DVD of the film was released by Eros Home Media.

== Box office ==
Bhool Bhulaiyaa was declared a hit at the box office by Box Office India, netting ₹497 million (US$5.2 million) in India. It was the 6th highest-grossing Bollywood film of 2007. It grossed ₹3,88,00,000 on its first day, while it grossed ₹23,50,00,000 in the first week. The total overseas gross was $3,910,000. The lifetime overseas breakup was $1,380,000 in the UK, $1,130,000 in North America, $820,000 in the UAE, $151,000 in Australia and $429,000 in other markets.

The film collected ₹84 crore (US$8.7 million) worldwide.

== Awards ==
Award	Category	Recipients and nominees	Results
Anandalok Awards	Best Actress (Hindi)	Vidya Balan	Won
Filmfare Awards	Best Actress	Vidya Balan	Nominated
Screen Awards	Best Actress	Vidya Balan	Nominated
Zee Cine Awards	Best Actress	Vidya Balan	Nominated
Producers Guild Film Awards	Best Actor in a Comic Role	Akshay Kumar	Nominated
Stardust Awards	Actor of the Year – Male	Akshay Kumar	Nominated
International Indian Film Academy Awards	Best Director	Priyadarshan	Nominated
International Indian Film Academy Awards	Best Actor	Akshay Kumar	Nominated
International Indian Film Academy Awards	Best Actress	Vidya Balan	Nominated
International Indian Film Academy Awards	Best Villain	Vidya Balan	Nominated
International Indian Film Academy Awards	Best Comedian	Paresh Rawal and Rajpal Yadav	Nominated
International Indian Film Academy Awards	Best Music Director	Pritam	Nominated
International Indian Film Academy Awards	Best Male Playback Singer	Neeraj Shridhar (for "Bhool Bhulaiyaa")	Nominated
International Indian Film Academy Awards	Best Female Playback Singer	Shreya Ghoshal (for "Mere Dholna")	Nominated

== Sequels ==
Bhool Bhulaiyaa 2, a spiritual sequel directed by Anees Bazmee and starring Kartik Aaryan, Tabu and Kiara Advani, released in 2022. The third installment, also by Bazmee, released in 2024 with Kartik Aaryan reprising his role as Rooh Baba from the sequel, and saw the return of Vidya Balan as Manjulika, along with Madhuri Dixit and Triptii Dimri. The third part also serves as a spiritual sequel and is not related to the earlier films.

== See also ==
- Dissociative Identity Disorder
- Shirley Ardell Mason, Wikipedia article about dissociative identity disorder briefly shown in the film
- List of Hindi horror films
- Mental illness in film
