= Bhool Bhulaiyaa 3 =

2024 Indian film by Anees Bazmee

- Theatrical release poster
- Directed by: Anees Bazmee
- Written by: Aakash Kaushik
- Produced by: Bhushan Kumar; Krishan Kumar; Murad Khetani
- Starring: Kartik Aaryan; Vidya Balan; Madhuri Dixit; Triptii Dimri
- Cinematography: Manu Anand
- Edited by: Sanjay Sankla
- Music by: Score: Sandeep Shirodkar; Songs: Pritam; Tanishk Bagchi; Amaal Mallik; Sachet–Parampara; Lijo George–DJ Chetas; Aditya Rikhari
- Production companies: T-Series Films; Cine1 Studios
- Distributed by: AA Films
- Release date: 1 November 2024
- Running time: 158 minutes
- Country: India
- Language: Hindi
- Budget: ₹150 crore
- Box office: est. ₹423.85 crore

Bhool Bhulaiyaa 3 (transl. Labyrinth 3) is a 2024 Indian Hindi-language comedy horror film directed by Anees Bazmee, written by Aakash Kaushik, and produced by T-Series Films and Cine1 Studios. It serves as the third installation of the eponymous franchise after Bhool Bhulaiyaa (2007) and Bhool Bhulaiyaa 2 (2022). It stars Kartik Aaryan, Vidya Balan, Madhuri Dixit and Triptii Dimri, and is set in Kolkata.

The film was officially announced in March 2023. Principal photography took place from March to September 2024 in Mumbai, Kolkata, Orchha, and Leh, with cinematography by Manu Anand. Bhool Bhulaiyaa 3 was theatrically released on 1 November 2024, coinciding with Diwali. It received mixed-to-positive reviews from critics and grossed over ₹423.85 crore worldwide, emerging as the second highest-grossing Hindi film and sixth highest-grossing Indian film of 2024.

== Plot ==
In 1824, a woman performing Kathak at Raktghat Palace is caught by the king and his guards, who burn her alive on the king's orders. Her spirit later returns, killing the guards and setting the king ablaze in his bed.

Two hundred years later, in 2024, Ruhaan, a conman posing as the ghostbuster "Rooh Baba", and his accomplice Tillu make a living by deceiving people in Kolkata. Ruhaan is summoned by a man claiming to be the "King" of Raktghat to exorcise the ghost of his niece, Meera. During the fake exorcism, Ruhaan admits he is a fraud, only to discover that Meera and her uncle staged the encounter to recruit him. Meera offers him ₹1 crore to help reclaim their supposedly haunted palace in West Bengal. Ruhaan accompanies them to Raktghat, where the impoverished royal family now lives outside the abandoned palace.

Meera and the royal priest recount a prophecy claiming that Princess Manjulika murdered her younger stepbrother, Prince Debendranath, after he was chosen over her as heir because of gender bias. The king had Manjulika burned alive, after which she allegedly returned as a vengeful spirit before being sealed inside her room. Because Ruhaan resembles Debendranath, the villagers believe he is the prince's reincarnation and destined to save them, though three fraudulent pundits remain sceptical.

As restoration of the palace begins, Meera and Ruhaan fall in love, and Mallika joins the project. Ruhaan, Meera and Mallika expose the fake pundits, who had been hiding inside Manjulika's supposedly sealed room to frighten others away. They then discover a second hidden chamber, which Ruhaan opens, unintentionally releasing another spirit. The priest reveals that Manjulika had an elder sister, Anjulika, whose existence was erased from history.

A royal woman named Mandira arrives intending to buy the palace after its restoration. She and Mallika repeatedly clash while the released spirit murders anyone attempting to purchase items from the palace. Ruhaan and Meera are haunted by visions of Mandira and Mallika, each claiming to be Manjulika, and the spirit traps everyone inside the palace.

On Durgashtami, Mandira and Mallika attack one another while both claim to be Manjulika. The priest prepares a magical oil to subdue the spirit, but it reveals that it is actually Prince Debendranath.

A flashback shows Debendranath, who is effeminate and secretly loves dancing Kathak. Anjulika and Manjulika feign support before betraying him to the king, who publicly humiliates and burns him alive. To preserve the royal family's honour, the king erases Anjulika from history and falsely portrays Manjulika as Debendranath's killer before exiling both sisters. Debendranath's spirit later kills the king and his guards but is captured and imprisoned in the hidden chamber, while Manjulika's room serves as a decoy.

In the present, Debendranath possesses both Mallika and Mandira, forcing the family to believe one must be burned alive. The truth emerges that Ruhaan is not Debendranath's reincarnation; instead, Mandira and Mallika are the reincarnations of Anjulika and Manjulika. Although the priest restrains the spirit, the sisters plead for forgiveness. Debendranath accepts their remorse, attains salvation, and finally departs.

In a mid-credit scene, Mandira reveals she is actually ACP Rathore, the police officer Ruhaan has been avoiding, causing him to faint as everyone laughs.

== Cast ==
- Kartik Aaryan in a dual role as:
  - Ruhaan Randhawa (Rooh Baba)
  - Debendranath
- Vidya Balan in a dual role as:
  - Mallika
  - Manjulika
- Madhuri Dixit in a dual role as:
  - ACP Rathore IPS/Mandira
  - Anjulika
- Triptii Dimri in a dual role as:
  - Meera
  - Madhulika Devi
- Vijay Raaz as Raja Sahib
- Rajpal Yadav as Natwar "Chhote Pandit"
- Sanjay Mishra as Jagannath Shastri "Bade Pandit"
- Ashwini Kalsekar as Panditayeen, Bade Pandit's wife
- Rajesh Sharma as Meera's uncle
- Arun Kushwah as Tillu
- Manish Wadhwa as Rajpurohit
- Shataf Figar as Vicky Khanna
- Saurabh Dubey as the Rajpurohit in 1824
- Denzil Smith as the Maharaj in 1824
- Suresh Menon as Pillai
- Moumita Pal as Pillai's wife
- Shivam Dubey as Pillai's son
- Surendra Thakur as Jallad
- Kanchan Mullick as Faulad Singh
- Prantika Das as Noor
- Agrim Mittal as Modak
- Ajay Tiwari as Daas
- Yogesh Jadhav as Senapati
- Rose Sardana as Meera's sister
- Swagatam Halder as Mr. Chopra
- Averi Singharoy as Mrs. Chopra
- Badri Chavan as Arjun / Pintu
- Arvind Prakash as Arjun's father
- Parineeta Borthakur as Arjun's mother

== Production ==
=== Casting ===
Kartik Aaryan was cast as an alternate version of his role from Bhool Bhulaiyaa 2. On 12 February 2024, it was announced that Vidya Balan, who played Manjulika in the original Bhool Bhulaiyaa (2007), would play an alternate version of her character, by sharing a video of Instagram. On 21 February 2024, it was announced that Madhuri Dixit and Triptii Dimri would be joining the project. Rajpal Yadav, known for his role as Chhota Pandit in the previous films, will also return to reprise his role. The cast also features Vijay Raaz, Rajesh Sharma, Manish Wadhwa, Sanjay Mishra, and Ashwini Kalsekar.

=== Filming ===
On 9 March 2024, in Mumbai, the cast and crew of Bhool Bhulaiyaa 3 gathered for an inaugural muhurat puja ceremony to mark the beginning of principal photography. Producer Bhushan Kumar clapped the muhurat shot for Kartik Aaryan. Vidya Balan, Triptii Dimri, Rajesh Sharma, and co-producer Shiv Chanana were also present at the ceremony. A glimpse video of this ceremony was shared by T-Series on 11 March 2024, titled "Bhool Bhulaiyaa 3 Begins", The video also featured Aaryan shooting the first shot of the movie, which was a train sequence, filmed by DOP Manu Anand.

During shooting, director Anees Bazmee faced significant challenges as he fractured his leg on the last day of the film recce. Against doctor's suggestions to get a steel plate and rest for 3 months, he opted for minor surgery that allowed him to honour his commitment to the film. He came to the film set in a wheelchair and continued with his work. The film's production involved extensive planning and coordination, with key members Bhushan Kumar, Bazmee, and Aaryan actively engaged in discussions and preparations.

Filming began in Mumbai, with the first schedule wrapping up on 27 March 2024. During this schedule, the entry sequence of Aaryan was also shot. A massive set was erected in Film City, Mumbai, specifically for the song, which involved over a thousand background dancers with choreography done by Ganesh Acharya. After a short break, Bazmee, still recovering from his injury, scouted for locations in Kolkata for the next schedule. The cast and crew landed in Kolkata on 8 April 2024, to commence the second schedule. In this schedule, Aaryan rode a bullet on Howrah Bridge, with Prantika Das and with Arun Kushwah at Victoria Memorial. The shooting then progressed to Mallick Ghat flower market, where a small set with skeletons was put up. Following this, Bazmee filmed scenes at the Park Street Graveyard and Nonapukur Tram Depot, and finally concluded the shoot at Laha Bari in Central Kolkata. Prior to this, key shots were filmed at an elaborate Bengali village set setup by the production team in Mumbai. The song 'Mere Dholna' has been filmed as jugalbandi between Madhuri and Vidya and has been choreographed by Chinni Prakash.

After completing the Kolkata schedule, the team resumed filming on the same Bengali set in Mumbai, with a segment involving Kartik Aaryan, Sanjay Mishra, Vijay Raaz, Rajpal Yadav, and Ashwini Kalsekar, wrapping up the week-long schedule on 13 May 2024. A significant dance sequence featuring lead actors was also filmed on 21 May 2024. On 29 May 2024; Balan, Dixit, Manish Wadhwa, Sharma, Raaz, Rose Sardana and others shot a sequence on the film's set in Mumbai, with Balan and Dixit twinning in black sarees.

Bazmee had shot Aaryan's scenes in advance, in May 2024, and continued filming without him for some days in early June. In early June 2024, the team took a break from shooting, allowing Aaryan to focus on promotional commitments for his film Chandu Champion, which was released on 14 June 2024. The next schedule was kicked off on 1 July 2024, in Orchha, Madhya Pradesh with Kartik Aaryan, Vidya Balan, Madhuri Dixit, Triptii Dimri, Rajpal Yadav, and others. Key scenes were shot at various historic landmarks such as Orchha Fort, Ram Raja Mandir, where some dramatic scenes were filmed, and Jahangir Mahal, where Aaryan filmed a romantic song and some romantic scenes with Dimri. The schedule included filming intense sequences at Kanchana Ghat on the Betwa River.

A part of the climax sequence with all the principal actors together, was also shot there, with Aaryan and other leads performing some action sequences. After shooting a portion of the climax in Orchha, the team returned to Mumbai to shoot the remaining scenes of the climax sequence with the entire cast. Principal photography was seemingly wrapped with final scenes being shot on 31 July and 1 August 2024. Additionally in September 2024, a romantic track featuring Aaryan and Dimri was shot in Leh, Ladakh. It was revealed that 2 different climax scene were filmed to keep the suspense around the ending of the film.

== Soundtrack ==
Bhool Bhulaiyaa 3

Soundtrack album by Pritam, Tanishk Bagchi, Amaal Mallik, Sachet–Parampara, Lijo George–DJ Chetas and Aditya Rikhari
- Released: 23 October 2024
- Recorded: 2023–2024
- Genre: Feature film soundtrack
- Length: 24:06
- Language: Hindi
- Label: T-Series
- Producer: Bhushan Kumar
External audio
- Bhool Bhulaiyaa 3 (Audio Jukebox) on YouTube

The background score of the film is composed by Sandeep Shirodkar, whereas the soundtrack is composed by Tanishk Bagchi, Amaal Mallik, Sachet–Parampara, Lijo George–DJ Chetas and Aditya Rikhari. The lyrics are written by Sameer Anjaan, Rashmi Virag, Aditya Rikhari, Dhrruv Yogi, Som and Pitbull. The "Title Track" and "Ami Je Tomar" song originally composed by Pritam were recreated once again after Bhool Bhulaiyaa 2.

The first single titled "Bhool Bhulaiyaa 3 – Title Track" was released on 16 October 2024. The second single titled "Jaana Samjho Na" was released on 22 October 2024, a reprised version of singer Aditya Rikhari's 2022 single "Samjho Na". The album was released on 23 October 2024 across all music streaming platforms.

Track listing
| No. | Title | Lyrics | Music | Singer(s) | Length |
|---|---|---|---|---|---|
| 1. | "Bhool Bhulaiyaa 3 –Title Track" | Dhruv Yogi, Sameer, Pitbull | Tanishk Bagchi, Pritam | Pitbull, Diljit Dosanjh, Neeraj Shridhar | 3:50 |
| 2. | "Jaana Samjho Na" | Aditya Rikhari | Lijo George-DJ Chetas, Aditya Rikhari | Aditya Rikhari, Tulsi Kumar | 3:32 |
| 3. | "Ami Je Tomar 3.0" | Sameer | Amaal Mallik, Pritam | Shreya Ghoshal | 5:15 |
| 4. | "Beiraada" | Rashmi Virag | Sachet–Parampara | Sachet Tandon, Parampara Tandon | 3:19 |
| 5. | "Hukkush Phukkush" | Som | Tanishk Bagchi | Sonu Nigam | 3:44 |
| 6. | "Mere Dholna 3.0" (Sonu Nigam Version) | Sameer | Amaal Mallik, Pritam | Sonu Nigam | 4:26 |
| Total length: | | | | | 24:06 |

== Release ==
=== Theatrical ===
Bhool Bhulaiyaa 3 was theatrically released on 1 November 2024, on the occasion of Diwali. The film was theatrically released in Bangladesh on the same day as its worldwide release and thus became the second Hindi film to be released in the country. The worldwide theatrical distribution rights were acquired by AA Films. Distributor Anil Thadani had secured rights of single screens for the film. The release clashed with the film Singham Again.

The film has been banned in Saudi Arabia due to mentions of homosexuality which is banned in the country.

=== Home media ===
The digital streaming rights of the film were acquired by Netflix for ₹135 crore. The film began streaming on the platform from 27 December 2024.

== Reception ==
=== Box office ===
Bhool Bhulaiyaa 3 earned ₹36.60 crore on opening day and a weekend total of ₹110.20 crore in India. As of 1 December 2024, the film has grossed ₹334.67 crore in India and ₹89.18 crore internationally. It concluded its run with worldwide gross estimated to be ₹423.85 crore worldwide.

=== Critical response ===
Bhool Bhulaiyaa 3 received mixed-to-positive reviews from critics. On the review aggregator website Rotten Tomatoes, 43% of 14 critics' reviews are positive, with an average rating of 6.1/10.

Bollywood Hungama rated the film 4.5 stars out of 5 and wrote, "Bhool Bhulaiyaa 3 is a well-made horror comedy which works due to its performances, taut script, creative execution and above all, an unpredictable climax." Sukanya Verma of Rediff.com rated the film 3/5 stars and opined "A gleefully hammy Madhuri and Vidya's volley of death stares and evil laughs engage in a ruthless glamorous tug of war in Bhool Bhulaiyaa 3". Renuka Vyavahare of The Times of India rated 3.5/5 stars and wrote "The movie is unabashedly entertaining, cheesy, and wild, with moments that will have you laughing out loud."

Vinamra Mathur of Firstpost rated the film 3/5 stars and wrote "Bhool Bhulaiyaa 3 could be savored taste; for those wanting to see romance have Aaryan and Dimri, for those waiting to see the OG Manjulika have Balan at their service, for anyone enamored by Dixit, she brings back the memories of Devdas with her thunderous aura and nimble moves. And for those stepping in with zero expectations, may not be exactly doing a Bhool!". Anuj Kumar of The Hindu says Bhool Bhulaiyaa 3 is a drab horror comedy where talented actors like Madhuri Dixit and Vidya Balan have been underutilised. He further says, "Kartik Aaryan is the lifeline who keeps the film alive with his situational humour but director Anees Bazmee has faltered between sticking to stereotypes and taking a progressive step." He continues that stereotyping of Bengalis and their culture has been done for easy laughs, but the film is ultimately a hypocritical charade.

Shubhra Gupta of The Indian Express rated the film 1.5/5 stars and wrote "Kartik Aaryan's Bhool Bhulaiyaa 3 suffers from the same things that Bhool Bhulaiyaa 2 did: stereotypes instead of characters, forced humour which refuses to land, and tasteless lines bordering on the risible." Saibal Chatterjee of NDTV rated the film 2.5 out of 5 stars and said "Kartik Aaryan's star turn is a repeat act that promises a box-office outcome that could be on par with what Bhool Bhulaiyaa 2 yielded." Udita Jhunjhunwala of Mint opined "The dynamic between Madhuri Dixit and Vidya Balan is an opportunity wasted in the long film, which is high on concept but low on mood". Abhimanyu Mathur of Hindustan Times writes "A brave climax attempts to elevate this otherwise middling horror comedy. The film simply tries to sell a brand through nostalgia, using a new(er) rendition of Ami Je Tomar and Vidya Balan."

Neha Sen of Deccan Herald rated the film 3 stars out of 5 and highlighted "The film retains some traditional horror elements while still trying to be comedic. It ends up delivering neither with much grace nor gusto. A few jumpscares scattered around and a handful of laughs are not enough to salvage the broken Bangla and thoroughly under-researched presentation of the Bengali culture and festivities." Nishad Thaivalappil of News18 rated 2/5 stars and opined "The film features unexplained flashbacks, and the mediocre jokes and predictable jump scares make it a rather dull watch." Tanmayi Savadi of Times Now rated the film 4 out of 5 stars and wrote "The film resorts to cliché jokes and dramatics. The scares are effective but never bone-chilling. It is enigmatic, mysterious and deceptive."

Ritika Handoo of Zee News rated the film 3 out of 5 stars and highlighted "What deserves a special mention here is the twist-filled climax. The writers have done their homework well to keep the crescendo high for the end." Nandini Ramnath of Scroll.in writes "Imagination is largely in short supply in the threequel. Except for a twist about Manjulika's identity that works well, the film has little that we haven't seen before in the previous movie." Amit Bhatia of ABP Live rated the film 3/5 stars and said "Vidya Balan and Madhuri Dixit breathe energy into the narrative, and while the comedy isn't as punchy as hoped, the story's twists and moral message manage to engage. With a blend of humour, nostalgia, and spooky twists, it's an entertaining ride that ultimately delivers a memorable experience."

Aakriti Agarwala of The Statesman rated the film 2.5 stars and wrote, "Bhool Bhulaiyaa 3 is a through-and-through climax-driven film that didn't know what to do with the first two hours. Dominated by dull comic punches and references, unnecessary and forced song sequences, and complete mutilation of the Bengali language and dialect, the film fails to keep the audiences at the edge of their seats. It was only in the last 30 minutes that the stars had the chance to shine."

== Accolades ==
Bhool Bhulaiyaa 3 – Awards and nominations
| Award | Category | Recipients | Result | Ref. |
|---|---|---|---|---|
| International Indian Film Academy (IIFA) Awards | Best Film | Bhushan Kumar; T-Series Films | Nominated | |
| International Indian Film Academy (IIFA) Awards | Best Director | Anees Bazmee | Nominated | |
| International Indian Film Academy (IIFA) Awards | Best Actor | Kartik Aaryan | Won | |
| International Indian Film Academy (IIFA) Awards | Best Supporting Actor | Rajpal Yadav | Nominated | |
| International Indian Film Academy (IIFA) Awards | Best Supporting Actress | Vidya Balan | Nominated | |
| International Indian Film Academy (IIFA) Awards | Best Music Director | Pritam; Tanishk Bagchi; Sachet–Parampara; Amaal Mallik; Adiya Rikhari; Lijo George; DJ Chetas | Nominated | |
| International Indian Film Academy (IIFA) Awards | Best Female Playback Singer | Shreya Ghoshal (for "Ami Je Tomar") | Won | |
| International Indian Film Academy (IIFA) Awards | Best Special Effects | Red Chillies VFX | Won | |
| Iconic Gold Awards | Best Film | Bhushan Kumar; T-Series Films | Won | |
| Iconic Gold Awards | Best Actor | Kartik Aaryan | Won | |
| Iconic Gold Awards | Best Director | Anees Bazmee | Won | |
| Iconic Gold Awards | Best Singer (male) | Sonu Nigam (for "Mere Dholna") | Won | |
| Zee Cine Awards | Best Film | Bhushan Kumar; T-Series Films | Nominated | |
| Zee Cine Awards | Best Actor (Viewer's Choice) | Kartik Aaryan | Won | |
| Zee Cine Awards | Best Supporting Actress | Madhuri Dixit | Won | |
| Zee Cine Awards | Best Background Score | Sandeep Shirodkar | Won | |
| Filmfare Awards | Best Film | Bhushan Kumar; T-Series Films | Nominated | |
| Filmfare Awards | Best Director | Anees Bazmee | Nominated | |
| Filmfare Awards | Best Supporting Actress | Madhuri Dixit | Nominated | |
| Filmfare Awards | Best Music Album | Pritam; Tanishk Bagchi; Sachet–Parampara; Amaal Mallik; Adiya Rikhari; Lijo George–DJ Chetas | Nominated | |
| Filmfare Awards | Best Male Playback Singer | Sonu Nigam (for "Mere Dholna") | Nominated | |
| Filmfare Awards | Best Story | Aakash Kaushik | Nominated | |
| Filmfare Awards | Best Choreography | Chinni Prakash | Nominated | |
