= Anthony Kaun Hai? =

- Movie poster
- Directed by: Raj Kaushal
- Written by: Soumik Sen
- Produced by: Nikhil Panchamiya
- Starring: Sanjay Dutt; Arshad Warsi; Minissha Lamba
- Cinematography: Hemant Chaturvedi
- Edited by: Sanjib Datta
- Music by: Himesh Reshammiya
- Distributed by: Fourth Wall Productions
- Release date: 4 August 2006
- Running time: 127 minutes
- Country: India
- Language: Hindi
- Box office: ₹172.1 million

Anthony Kaun Hai? (transl. 'Who is Anthony?') is a 2006 Indian Hindi-language mystery thriller film directed by Raj Kaushal and produced by Nikhil Panchamiya. It stars Sanjay Dutt, Arshad Warsi, Minissha Lamba and Raghuvir Yadav. It is a remake of the 2002 film Who Is Cletis Tout? starring Christian Slater.

== Plot ==
The film is set in Bangkok, Thailand. Master Madan, an underworld killer, performs a mission to claim a debt and takes Anthony Gonsalves as hostage. Madan threatens the debtor that he will kill Gonsalves if he doesn't repay the debt in two hours. However, Gonsalves claims he is not the Anthony Gonsalves Madan is looking for and tells him a story to clarify.

Gonsalves says his real name is Champak Chaudhary, alias Champ. He made a living by forging passports, ID cards, and other legal documents. He was in love with Roza, who agreed to marry him. Champ is arrested during their wedding and sentenced to six months in jail.

In jail, Champ meets Raghu, who is serving a life sentence for stealing diamonds from the Thai Queen. Raghu is a magician and used his magic tricks to steal the Queen's diamonds; he did it for his daughter Jia, and he buried the stolen diamonds before he was arrested. Raghu pretends to be deaf and dumb in jail. Champ is the first one to discover Raghu is neither deaf nor dumb as he talks with Champ. Raghu speaks to Champ because he wants his help to get out of jail, as the former learns his wife is dead and his daughter Jia is now alone. He offers half of his diamonds, worth 100 million THB, in exchange for Champ's help to get him out of jail.

Champ initially refuses Raghu's offer, as he will finish his sentence very soon and does not want more trouble. However, after Champ is released, he learns Roza is married to another man and pregnant. Upset, Champ agrees with Raghu's offer and gets him out of jail with a forged release notice.

The real Anthony Gonsalves is, however, a journalist who is eager to find a big scandal. He soon finds a powerful man, Lucky Sharma, murdering a girl and films it with his camera. He sends a copy of the video to Lucky to blackmail him for 10 million THB. Lucky later kills the real Gonsalves.

Released, Champ and Raghu get their new identities from Champ's friend Dr. Lashwani. However, Champ's new identity is Anthony Gonsalves, because Lashwani was conducting an autopsy on the real Gonsalves's dead body when Champ asked for help. Champ and Raghu meet Jia later.

After Champ begins using Gonsalves's identity, Lucky is shocked to know that Gonsalves is still alive, and plans to kill him again. However, Champ, who they think is Gonsalves, escapes, and Raghu dies in the shooting.

Learning her father owes 50 million THB to Champ for getting him out of jail, Jia shows Champ the place where her father buried the diamonds, which is now inside a jailyard. Champ falls in love with Jia, and he soon learns who is real Anthony Gonsalves and his story of him, so he reports to the police and asks to be locked in jail as witness protection. In the jail, Champ digs out the diamonds and sends them one by one to Jia through a pigeon.

Champ later gives the CD to inspector Suraj Singh, and Lucky Sharma is arrested.

After listening to Champ's full story, Master Madan supports him. He shoots Lucky Sharma's men, who come to kill Champ. He lends his Ferrari to Champ for catching the flight that Jia is supposed to fly with. Champ sees Jia at the airport before she boards the flight, and they confess their love to each other and reunite.

== Cast ==
- Sanjay Dutt as Master Madan (extended cameo appearance)
- Arshad Warsi as Champak "Champ" Choudhary / Anthony Gonsalves
- Minissha Lamba as Jia Sharma
- Raghuvir Yadav as Raghuveer Sharma, Jia's father
- Anusha Dhandekar as Rosa
- Gulshan Grover as Inspector Suraj Singh
- Ravi Baswani as Dr. Lashwani
- Anupam Shyam as Pappu
- Rajesh Tiwari as Pappu's Henchman
- Himesh Reshammiya as himself - Special appearance

== Soundtrack ==
Anthony Kaun Hai?

Soundtrack album by Himesh Reshammiya
- Released: 3 July 2006
- Recorded: 2006
- Venue: Mumbai
- Genre: Feature film soundtrack
- Label: T-Series
- Producer: Himesh Reshammiya

Himesh Reshammiya chronology
Ahista Ahista (2006)	Anthony Kaun Hai? (2006)	Chup Chup Ke (2006)

#	Title	Singer(s)
1	"Tune Mera Chain Vain Le Liya"	Kunal Ganjawala, Shreya Ghoshal
2	"Because I Love You"	Kunal Ganjawala, Gayatri Iyer
3	"Let's Rock"	KK, Sunidhi Chauhan
4	"Ishq Kiya Kiya"	Himesh Reshammiya
5	"No Way No Way"	KK and Himesh Reshammiya
6	"Bhangra Paale"	Sonu Nigam, Saru Maini

== Reception ==
Taran Adarsh of IndiaFM gave the film 2.5 out of 5, writing, ″On the whole, Anthony Kaun Hai? is a decent fare that would appeal to the elite more than the commoners.″
