= Kee (film) =

- Theatrical Release Poster
- Directed by: Kalees
- Written by: Kalees
- Produced by: S. Michael Rayappan
- Starring: Jiiva; Nikki Galrani; Anaika Soti; Govind Padmasoorya
- Cinematography: Abinandhan Ramanujam
- Edited by: Nagooran Ramachandran
- Music by: Vishal Chandrasekhar
- Production company: Global Infotainment
- Release date: 10 May 2019
- Running time: 132 minutes
- Country: India
- Language: Tamil

Kee is a 2019 Indian Tamil-language action techno-thriller film written and directed by Kalees in his directorial debut and produced by Michael Rayappan. The film stars Jiiva, Nikki Galrani, Anaika Soti and Govind Padmasoorya with RJ Balaji, Rajendra Prasad, and Suhasini in supporting roles. Featuring music composed by Vishal Chandrasekhar, the film began production during August 2016. Upon release, the film got negative reviews from critics.

== Plot ==
Siddharth is a hacker who leads a delightful life, which includes his father, Rao, & his mother. One day, when he goes to college, he meets a girl named Diya. However, an unexpected incident leads him to another hacker named Shivam, who knows that only Siddharth can hack their illegal hacking system. Enraged with this knowledge, Shivam sends men to kill Siddharth, whom Rao shields, who gets caught in the crossfire and injured in the process. Devastated over Rao's condition, Siddharth decided to find who responsible for Rao's condition.Eventually, Siddharth finds the culprit behind the attack on Rao while also learning the reason for his friend', Anu suicide. As Siddharth looks for Shivam, he gets a statement of his girlfriend, Diya's abduction. Eventually, through some clues, Siddharth finds the kidnapper and saves Diya. Shivam and his goons try to coerce Siddharth to join their side but he doesn't take herd; he makes dry ice bombs and proceeds to kill Shivam and his cronies. Finally, he kills Shivam with a dry ice bomb. Rao finally recovers and Siddharth reunite with Diya.

6 months later, while in New York, Siddharth got a call from a masked person who said they are coming for him indicating Shivam is not dead as he is immortal.

== Cast ==
- Jiiva as Siddharth
- Nikki Galrani (voice: Savitha) as Diya
- Anaika Soti (voice: Haasini) as Vandana
- Govind Padmasoorya as Shivam alias "Roncracker"
- RJ Balaji as Mark
- Robo Shankar as Anthony
- Rajendra Prasad as Rao, Siddharth's father
- Suhasini Maniratnam as Siddharth's mother
- Meera Krishnan as Diya's mother
- Manobala as College Professor
- Ravi Mariya as Minister
- Crane Manohar as Cook
- Swathishta Krishnan as Anu, Siddharth's late friend
- Deeksha Seth as Nandini
- Gowtham Sundararajan as Ram, a victim of Roncracker
- Sindhu Shyam as a victim of Roncracker
- Athulya Ravi as Diya's friend (uncredited)

== Production ==
The film was announced by the producers, Global Infotainment, during late June 2018, where it was reported that debutant Kalees, an associate of director Selvaraghavan, would work on a romantic script revolving around a geek. Jiiva and Nikki Galrani were revealed to be portraying leading roles, while veteran Telugu actor Rajendra Prasad was selected to play Jiiva's father. The film entered production during mid-August 2018, with Anaika Soti also joining the cast. In early October Malayalam TV host and actor Govind Padmasoorya signed into play the anti hero which marks his debut in Tamil cinema.

== Soundtrack ==
The Kee soundtrack comprises 5 songs composed by Vishal Chandrasekhar:

- "Pattikichu Paathiya" sung by Devan Ekambaram.
- "Kattappa Kattappa" sung by Krishnaprasad.
- "Kaadhoram" sung by Vijay Prakash.
- "Kudutha Paaru Kee" sung by a member of the music team Tupakeys.
- "Raajapaattu" sung by Christopher Stanley and Sri Rascol.
