= Kalees =

Indian film director and screenwriter

- Born: A. Kaleeswaran; Tamil Nadu, India
- Occupations: Film director; screenwriter
- Years active: 2019-present

A. Kaleeswaran, better known as Kalees is an Indian director and screenwriter who works in Tamil and Hindi films. He is the former assistant of director Selvaraghavan. He made his debut with the 2019 techo-thriller film Kee.

== Career ==
His directorial debut was 2019 Tamil techno thriller film Kee starring Jiiva and Nikki Galrani. The film received mixed reviews from critics and was a box office bomb. His second directorial with the Hindi film Baby John, a remake of the 2016 Tamil film Theri starring Varun Dhawan, Keerthy Suresh, and Wamiqa Gabbi. which was also an box office bomb.

== Filmography ==
Year	Title	Language	Notes
2019	Kee	Tamil	
2024	Baby John	Hindi	Remake of Theri
