= Mumbai Mast Kallander =

- Film poster
- Directed by: Aman Mihani
- Written by: Sanyukta Ray; Raj Shekhar
- Produced by: Aman Mihani
- Starring: Shilpa Shukla; Tarun Anand; Luna Lahkar Dutt; Raj Shekhar; Shankar Sachdev; Rajesh Vivek
- Cinematography: Anil Singh
- Edited by: Zaheer Ahmed
- Music by: Teenu Arora (music) Panchhi Jalonvi (lyrics); Anaamik, Afsar, Sajid (music)
- Release date: 14 January 2011
- Country: India
- Language: Hindi / English

Mumbai Mast Kallander (transl. Mumbai's fun calendar) is a 2011 Indian film starring Shilpa Shukla, Tarun Anand and Rajesh Vivek, Produced and Directed byAman Mihani.

== Plot ==
Mumbai Mast Kallander is about a kidnapping gone wrong. The attempt is to create confusion and humour out of it. Two brother Ram and Shyam, petty criminals aspiring for Don-like status. Their dreams bring them to Mumbai, where they are hired to work as henchmen for Bade Bhai and after kidnapping start confusion and more confusion.

== Cast ==
- Mohsin as Ram Lakhan Yadav
- Muzzi as Shyam Lakhan Yadav
- Shilpa Shukla as Rhea
- Luna as Megha Chatterjee
- Tarun Anand as Aditya
- Shankar Sachdev as Inspector Shankar Sachdev
- Aakash Deep as Havaldar Pingle
- Rajendra Sethi as Vikram
- Rajesh Vivek as Badey Bhaiya
- Ashraf Ul Haq as Shahenshah
- Vineet Kapoor as Hitlet Yaadya
- Raj Shekhar
- Muskan Kocher as Young Megha Chatterjee

== Critical response ==
Mumbai DNA newspaper gave 2.5 out of 5 stars, Noyon Jyoti Parasara gave 1 out of 5 stars, stating, "Overall Mumbai Mast Kallander does not generate any interest, especially when you have far better options like Yamla Pagla Deewana in the same genre. And neither does the director have good enough reasons to call the film by the name. Interestingly just over a month back we had seen another "kidnapping gone wrong comedy" in Phas Gaye Re Obama. Bollywood indeed is a perfect example of diversity!".
Blessy Chettiar described, "Debutant director (and producer) Aman Mihani has made a forgettable attempt with Mumbai Mast Kallander. Reasons to go catch this one in a theatre are too few and far between. You could wait for its television release without missing too much."

== Soundtrack ==
All lyrics are written by Panchhi Jalonvi.

No.	Title	Lyrics	Music	Singer(s)	Length
1.	"Sloshed" (Duet)	Prashant Ingole	Teenu Arora	Neeraj Shridhar, Saru Maini
2.	"Mumbai Mast Kallander" (Duet)			Neuman Pinto, Shilpa Rao, Earl Edgar
3.	"Ram Naam Bhaj Le" (Solo)			Neeraj Shridhar
4.	"Sunn Zara" (Solo)			KK
5.	"Mess It Up" (Duet)			Shail Hada, Earl Edgar
6.	"Mar Jana Soniye" (Duet)			Shail Hada, Aditi Singh Sharma
