= Anees Bazmee =

Indian filmmaker (born 1962)

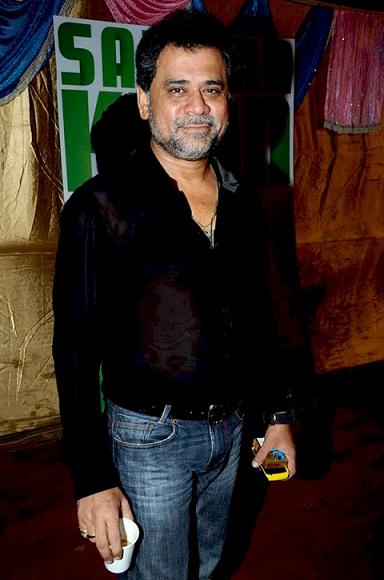
- Bazmee in 2011
- Born: 1 November 1962 (age 63); Modasa, Gujarat, India
- Occupations: Film director; screenwriter; film producer
- Years active: 1982–present
- Spouse: Fatima Bazmee

Anees Bazmee is an Indian film director, screenwriter and producer who works in Hindi cinema. He is best known directing for No Entry (2005), Welcome (2007), Singh is Kinng (2008), Bhool Bhulaiyaa 2 (2022), and Bhool Bhulaiyaa 3 (2024).

== Early life ==
Born to Urdu poet Abdul Hameed 'Nerang' Bazmee into a Gujarati Muslim family, Bazmee began as a child actor in films like Kitaab (1977) before becoming an assistant director for Raj Kapoor's Prem Rog (1982) and then a screenwriter with David Dhawan's Swarg (1990).

== Career ==
Bazmee did his directorial debut with Hulchul in 1995, however his first commercial success came in 1998 with the film Pyaar To Hona Hi Tha, one of the highest-grossing Bollywood films of the year. He achieved further success as well as recognition by directing the top-grossing comedies including No Entry (2005), Welcome (2007), Singh Is Kinng (2008), Ready (2011), Welcome Back (2015), Bhool Bhulaiyaa 2 (2022) and Bhool Bhulaiyaa 3 (2024), while also receiving praise for directing the moderately successful romantic thriller Deewangee (2002).

== Filmography ==
Key
†	Denotes films that have not yet been released

=== As director and writer ===
Year	Title	Director	Writer	Notes
1990	Swarg	No	Yes	
1990	Pratibandh	No	Yes	
1992	Yaad Rakhegi Duniya	No	Yes	
1992	Shola Aur Shabnam	No	Yes	
1992	Apradhi	No	Yes	
1992	Aaj Ka Goonda Raaj	No	Yes	Remake; original story writer not credited
1992	Bol Radha Bol	No	Yes	
1993	King Uncle	No	Yes	
1993	Aankhen	No	Yes	
1994	Raja Babu	No	Yes	
1994	Eena Meena Deeka	No	Yes	
1994	Gopi Kishan	No	Yes	
1994	Andaz	No	Yes	
1994	Laadla	No	Yes	
1994	The Gentleman	No	Yes	
1994	Mr. Azaad	No	Yes	
1995	Angrakshak	No	Dialogues	
1995	Gundaraj	No	Yes	
1995	Hulchul	Yes	Yes	Directorial debut
1995	Andolan	No	Yes	
1996	Army	No	Yes	
1997	Sanam	No	Yes	
1997	Prithvi	No	Yes	
1997	Deewana Mastana	No	Yes	
1998	Pyaar To Hona Hi Tha	Yes	Yes	
1999	Sirf Tum	No	Yes	
2000	Raju Chacha	No	Yes	
2001	Mujhe Meri Biwi Se Bachaao	No	Yes	
2002	Deewangee	Yes	Yes	
2002	Karz	No	Yes	
2004	Mujhse Shaadi Karogi	No	Yes	
2005	No Entry	Yes	No	
2006	Sandwich	Yes	No	
2007	Welcome	Yes	No	
2008	Singh Is Kinng	Yes	No	
2010	Shortkut	No	Yes	
2010	No Problem	Yes	Yes	
2011	Thank You	Yes	Yes	co-written with Rajan Aggarwal, Nisar Akhtar, Rajiv Kaul, Ikram Akhtar
2011	Ready	Yes	No	
2015	Welcome Back	Yes	Yes	
2017	Mubarakan	Yes	No	
2019	Pagalpanti	Yes	Yes	
2020	It's My Life	Yes	Yes	Delayed release; Filmed in 2007
2022	Bhool Bhulaiyaa 2	Yes	No	Nominated - Filmfare Award for Best Director
2024	Bhool Bhulaiyaa 3	Yes	No	
2024	Naam	Yes	Yes	Delayed release; Filmed in 2004
TBA	Untitled film †	Yes	Yes	Filming

=== As actor ===
Year	Film	Notes & Ref.
1981	Naseeb	As a child actor
1992	Aaj Ka Goonda Raaj	
1995	Dilwale Dulhania Le Jayenge	
1995	Angrakshak	
2015	Care of Footpath 2	Kannada-Hindi bilingual film
