= Lehren =

Indian film production company

Lehren Networks Private Limited
- Type: Privately held company
- Industry: Media and entertainment
- Headquarters: Mumbai, India
- Website: www.lehren.com

Lehren Networks Private Limited is a network of media and entertainment websites about India's entertainment industry, primarily Bollywood and related extensions. The company is located in Mumbai, India, and was founded by Mritunjay Pandey. Lehren covers celebrity life, gossip, and other related events.

== History ==
Lehren began in 1987 as a producer of film-based entertainment shows for India's then emerging television industry. This included the news magazine/television show Lehren, which aired during the 1990s, focusing on Hindi film. In addition to film-based television shows and stations, Lehren created VHS video content, and became one of the largest media producers in India. Since the 2000s, Lehren has provided video packaged film scenes, songs, interviews, and magazine content. Its videos are shown on websites including MSN. Lehren Networks Private Limited (formerly known as Lehren Entertainment) was specifically incorporated in 2009 to carry on digital media and entertainment businesses, and founded by Mritunjay Pandey. In 2014 the company formed a partnership with Rightster. Lehren TV channels are also available on mobile apps.
