= Bits of Naaz =

EP by Naaz
- Released: 20 April 2018
- Recorded: 2017
- Studio: Naaz's home
- Genre: bedroom pop
- Label: Universal Music Group

Naaz chronology
Bits of Naaz (2018)	The Beautiful Struggle (2019)

Singles from Bits of Naaz
- 1. "Words" Released: 19 May 2017; 2. "Can't" Released: 18 August 2017; 3. "Up to Something" Released: 13 October 2017; 4. "Loving Love" Released: 12 February 2018

Bits of Naaz is the debut extended play by Dutch-Kurdish singer Naaz, released on 20 April 2018 by Universal Music Group. Preceded by the singles "Words", "Can't", "Up to Something", and "Loving Love", the extended play delves into topics of acceptance and love. Naaz, at the time a teenager, recorded the extended play in her bedroom.

== Background ==
Naaz first received media attention in 2014, after she auditioned on Holland's Got Talent. After being eliminated from the show, she was featured on the Yellow Claw songs "Feel It" and "Catch Me". In 2016, she released her debut single, "Sadboy".

== Composition ==
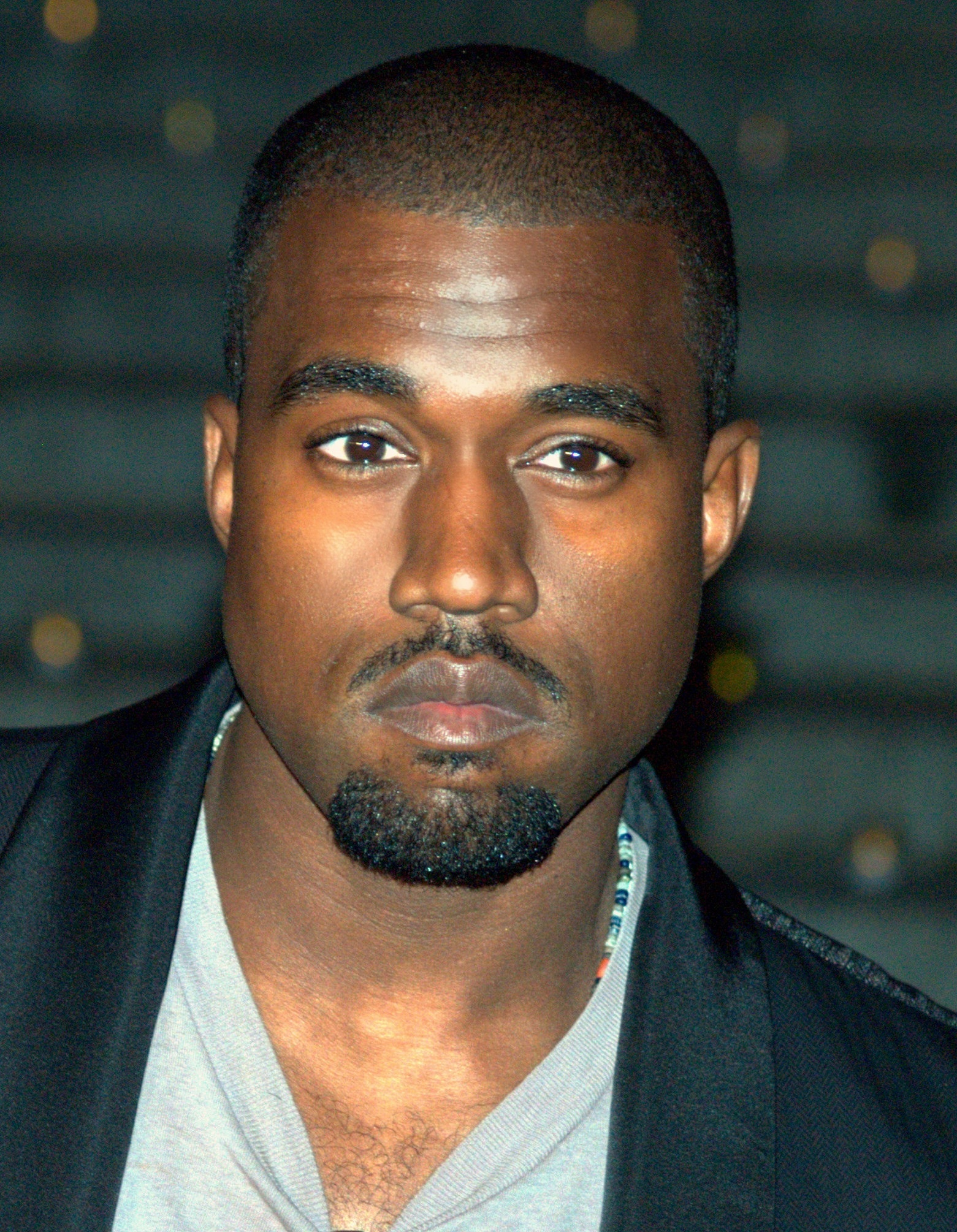
Naaz took inspiration from American rapper Kanye West when producing the extended play.

=== Recording ===
She used a Yamaha keyboard and a laptop to create the songs. Because Naaz was inexperienced, and did not know how to play instruments well, she borrowed sounds from the environment around her and used them in the extended play. The song "As Fun" was recorded in a studio that used to be Adolf Hitler's airport. Naaz noted that "they turned what used to be a really dark place into something that rather shines light, as it’s now a spot for creatives and a shelter for refugees".

== Singles ==
The extended play's release was preceded by four singles. The first single, "Words", was released in May 2017. The second single from the extended play was "Can't", released in August 2017. "Can't" is described as a song that "explores a forbidden love that's romantically sentimental". The third single, "Up to Something", was released in October of the same year. The fourth and final single, "Loving Love", was released in February 2018.

== Track listing ==
Bits of Naaz track listing
No.	Title	Length
1.	"Someday"	3:59
2.	"As Fun"	3:51
3.	"Pretty"	3:15
4.	"Mess Me Up"	3:50
5.	"Words"	4:13
6.	"Loving Love"	3:29
7.	"Can't"	3:25
8.	"Up to Something"	3:24

== Charts ==
Chart performance for Bits of Naaz
Chart (2018)	Peak position
Dutch Albums (Album Top 100)	82
