= List of Hindi films of 2024 =

This is a list of Hindi cinema films released in 2024.

== Box office collection ==
The following is the list of highest-grossing Hindi cinema films released in 2024.

Highest grossing Hindi cinema films of 2024
Rank (Note: Sorted based on the lowest value when figures are presented as a range, and for the same value, the older item is given a higher order.)	Title	Production company	Distributor	Worldwide gross	Ref.
1	Stree 2	Jio Studios; Maddock Films	PVR Inox Pictures; Pen Marudhar Entertainment	₹874.58 crore	
2	Bhool Bhulaiyaa 3	T-Series Films; Cine1 Studios	AA Films	₹423.85 crore	
3	Singham Again	Jio Studios; Reliance Entertainment; Cinergy; Devgn Films; Rohit Shetty Picturez	PVR Inox Pictures	₹389.64 crore	
4	Fighter	Viacom18 Studios; Marflix Pictures	Viacom18 Studios	₹344.46 crore	
5	Shaitaan	Jio Studios; Devgn Films; Panorama Studios	Panorama Studios	₹211.06 crore	
6	Crew	Balaji Motion Pictures; Anil Kapoor Films & Communication Network	Pen Marudhar Entertainment	₹157.08 crore	
7	Teri Baaton Mein Aisa Uljha Jiya	Jio Studios; Maddock Films	Pen Marudhar Entertainment	₹133.64 crore	
8	Munjya	Maddock Films	Pen Marudhar Entertainment	₹132.13 crore	
9	Bad Newz	Amazon Prime; Dharma Productions; Leo Media Collective	AA Films	₹115.74 crore	
10	Article 370	Jio Studios; B62 Studios	PVR Inox Pictures	₹110.57 crore	

== January–March ==
Opening		Title	Director	Cast	Studio (production house)	Ref.
J A N	5	Tauba Tera Jalwa	Akashaditya Lama	Jatin Khurana; Ameesha Patel; Angela Krislinzki	Shreeram Productions, Victorious Enterprises	
J A N	5	Main Paapi Hoon	Jay Dogra	Ankur Nayyar	Tri Dot Production	
J A N	12	Merry Christmas (Note: The film was produced in both the Hindi and Tamil languages, according to the filmmakers.)	Sriram Raghavan	Katrina Kaif; Vijay Sethupathi	Tips Industries, Matchbox Pictures	
J A N	19	Main Atal Hoon	Ravi Jadhav	Pankaj Tripathi	Bhanushali Studios, Legend Studios	
J A N	25	Fighter	Siddharth Anand	Hrithik Roshan; Deepika Padukone; Anil Kapoor; Karan Singh Grover; Akshay Oberoi; Sanjeeda Sheikh	Viacom18 Studios, Marflix Pictures	
F E B
F E B	9	Teri Baaton Mein Aisa Uljha Jiya	Amit Joshi; Aradhana Sah	Shahid Kapoor; Kriti Sanon; Dharmendra; Dimple Kapadia	Jio Studios, Maddock Films	
F E B	9	Bhakshak	Pulkit	Bhumi Pednekar; Sanjay Mishra; Sai Tamhankar; Aditya Srivastava	Red Chillies Entertainment, Netflix	
F E B	9	Lantrani	Gurvinder Singh; Kaushik Ganguly; Bhaskar Hazarika	Jitendra Kumar; Jisshu Sengupta; Johnny Lever; Nimisha Sajayan; Sanjay Mahanand; Boloram Das	Neeljai Films, Tyche Films Media Solutions, ZEE5	
F E B	9	Mirg	Tarun Sharma	Satish Kaushik; Anup Soni; Shwetaabh Singh; Raj Babbar	Studio RA, NaMA Productions, OneShot Films	
F E B	16	Dashmi	Shantanu Anant Tambe	Vardhan Puri; Gaurav Sareen; Sanjay Pandey; Rajesh Jais	3S Movies	
F E B	16	Kuch Khattaa Ho Jaay	G. Ashok	Guru Randhawa; Saiee Manjrekar; Anupam Kher; Ila Arun	Mach Films	
F E B	23	Crakk	Aditya Datt	Vidyut Jammwal; Nora Fatehi; Arjun Rampal; Amy Jackson	Action Hero Films	
F E B	23	Article 370	Aditya Suhas Jambhale	Yami Gautam; Priyamani; Skand Thakur; Ashwini Kaul; Vaibhav Tatwawadi; Arun Govil; Kiran Karmarkar	Jio Studios, B62 Studios	
F E B	23	All India Rank	Varun Grover	Bodhisattva Sharma; Samta Sudiksha; Sheeba Chaddha; Geeta Agrawal; Neeraj Ayush Pandey; Saadat Khan	Karmic Films, Matchbox Shots, Clocktower Pictures & Co.	
F E B	23	Chote Nawab	Kumud Chaudhary	Akshay Oberoi; Plabita Borthakur; Svar Kamble; Shataf Figar; Ekavali Khanna; Rajshri Deshpande; Falaq Naaz; Sadiya Siddiqui; Lalit Tiwari; Sohaila Kapur; Ayush Tandon; Neeraj Sood	Yoodlee Films	
M A R	1	Laapataa Ladies	Kiran Rao	Ravi Kishan; Nitanshi Goel; Pratibha Ranta; Sparsh Srivastav; Chhaya Kadam	Jio Studios, Aamir Khan Productions, Kindling Pictures	
M A R	1	Dange	Bejoy Nambiar	Harshvardhan Rane; Ehan Bhat; Nikita Dutta; TJ Bhanu	T-Series Films, Roox Media, Getaway Pictures	
M A R	1	Operation Valentine (Note: The film was produced in both the Hindi and Telugu languages, according to the filmmakers.)	Shakti Pratap Singh Hada	Varun Tej; Manushi Chhillar	Sony Pictures India, Renaissance Pictures, God Bless Entertainment	
M A R	1	Kaagaz 2	V. K. Prakash	Anupam Kher; Darshan Kumar; Smiriti Kalra; Satish Kaushik; Neena Gupta	Satish Kaushik Entertainment, Venus Worldwide Entertainment	
M A R	1	Fairy Folk	Karan Gour	Rasika Duggal; Mukul Chadda; Chandrachoor Rai	Empatheia Films, Bala Wala Cinema, Awe Studios and Timbuktu Triforce Cinema & Entertainment	
M A R	8	Shaitaan	Vikas Bahl	Ajay Devgn; R. Madhavan; Jyothika	Jio Studios, Devgn Films, Panorama Studios, Good Co.	
M A R	8	Tera Kya Hoga Lovely	Balwinder Singh Janjua	Randeep Hooda; Ileana D'Cruz; Karan Kundrra	Sony Pictures India, Movie Tunnel Productions	
M A R	8	Alpha Beta Gamma	Shankar Srikumar	Nishan; Amit Kumar Vashisth; Reena Aggarwal	Choti Film Productions, Knownsense Entertainment	
M A R	15	Yodha	Sagar Ambre; Pushkar Ojha	Sidharth Malhotra; Raashii Khanna; Disha Patani	Amazon MGM Studios, Dharma Productions, Mentor Disciple Entertainment	
M A R	15	Bastar: The Naxal Story	Sudipto Sen	Adah Sharma; Shilpa Shukla; Yashpal Sharma; Subrat Dutta; Raima Sen	Sunshine Pictures	
M A R	15	Murder Mubarak	Homi Adajania	Sara Ali Khan; Pankaj Tripathi; Vijay Varma; Dimple Kapadia; Karisma Kapoor; Sanjay Kapoor; Tisca Chopra; Suhail Nayyar	Maddock Films, Netflix	
M A R	21	Ae Watan Mere Watan	Kannan Iyer	Sara Ali Khan; Sparsh Srivastav; Anand Tiwari; Benedict Garrett; Alexx O'Nell; Abhay Verma	Dharmatic Entertainment, Amazon Prime Video	
M A R	22	Madgaon Express	Kunal Khemu	Divyenndu; Pratik Gandhi; Avinash Tiwary; Nora Fatehi; Upendra Limaye; Chhaya Kadam	Excel Entertainment	
M A R	22	Swatantrya Veer Savarkar	Randeep Hooda	Randeep Hooda; Ankita Lokhande; Amit Sial	Zee Studios, Randeep Hooda Films, Anand Pandit Motion Pictures, Legend Studios, Avak Films	
M A R	29	Crew	Rajesh A Krishnan	Tabu; Kareena Kapoor Khan; Kriti Sanon; Diljit Dosanjh	Balaji Motion Pictures, Anil Kapoor Films & Communication Network	
M A R	29	Woh Bhi Din The	Sajid Ali	Rohit Saraf; Adarsh Gourav; Sanjana Sanghi	Rising Sun Films, Kino Works, ZEE5	
M A R	29	Patna Shuklla	Vivek Budakoti	Raveena Tandon; Manav Vij	Arbaaz Khan Production, Disney+ Hotstar	
M A R	29	Bengal 1947	Akashaditya Lama	Devoleena Bhattacharjee; Omkar Das Manikpuri; Aditya Lakhia; Sohaila Kapur	COMFED Productions, Think Tank Global	

== April–June ==
Opening		Title	Director	Cast	Studio (production house)	Ref.
A P R	5	Dukaan	Siddharth–Garima	Monika Panwar; Sikandar Kher; Monali Thakur	Waveband Productions, Kalamkaar Picture Productions	
A P R	11	Bade Miyan Chote Miyan	Ali Abbas Zafar	Akshay Kumar; Tiger Shroff; Prithviraj Sukumaran; Manushi Chhillar; Alaya F; Sonakshi Sinha; Ronit Bose Roy	Pooja Entertainment, AAZ Films	
A P R	11	Maidaan	Amit Sharma	Ajay Devgn; Priyamani; Gajraj Rao	Zee Studios, Bayview Projects, Fresh Lime Films	
A P R	12	Amar Singh Chamkila	Imtiaz Ali	Diljit Dosanjh; Parineeti Chopra	Window Seat Films, Select Media Holdings, Saregama, Netflix	
A P R	12	Ameena	Kumar Raj	Rekha Rana; Anant Mahadevan	Kumar Raj Productions	
A P R	12	Gauraiya Live	Gabriel Vats	Ada Singh; Randhir Singh Thakur; Omkar Das Manikpuri; Shagufta Ali; Pankaj Jha; Seema Saini	Rare Films, Tea and Poetry Films	
A P R	16	Silence 2: The Night Owl Bar Shootout	Aban Bharucha Deohans	Manoj Bajpayee; Prachi Desai; Sahil Vaid; Parul Gulati; Shruti Bapna	Zee Studios, Candid Creations, ZEE5	
A P R	19	Love Sex Aur Dhokha 2	Dibakar Banerjee	Mouni Roy; Nimrit Kaur Ahluwalia; Tusshar Kapoor; Urfi Javed; Sophie Choudry	Balaji Telefilms, Cult Movies, DBP	
A P R	19	Do Aur Do Pyaar	Shirsha Guha Thakurta	Vidya Balan; Pratik Gandhi; Ileana D'Cruz; Sendhil Ramamurthy	Applause Entertainment, Ellipsis Entertainment	
A P R	19	Kaam Chalu Hai	Palash Muchhal	Rajpal Yadav; Giaa Manek; Kurangi Nagraj	Baseline Studios, Pal Music & Films, ZEE5	
A P R	19	Appu	Prosenjit Ganguly	Arjun Bajwa; Rupa Bhimani; Abhijit Bhunia	Appu Series	
A P R	19	Luv You Shankar	Rajiv S. Ruia	Shreyas Talpade; Tanishaa Mukerji; Abhimanyu Singh; Hemant Pandey	SD World Film Production	
A P R	19	The Legacy of Jineshwar	Pradeep P. Jadhav; Vivek Iyer	Shubham Vyas; Surendra Pal; Anil Lalwani; Manish Bishla	Mahaveer Talkies, Shri Khartargachha Sahastrabdi Mahotsava Samiti presentation	
A P R	26	Ruslaan	Karan Butani	Aayush Sharma; Sushrii Shreya Mishraa; Jagapathi Babu; Vidya Malvade	Sri Sathya Sai Arts	
A P R	26	Main Ladega	Gaurav Rana	Akash Pratap Singh	Kathakaar Films	
M A Y	10	Srikanth	Tushar Hiranandani	Rajkummar Rao; Jyothika; Alaya F; Sharad Kelkar	T-Series Films, Chalk N Cheese Films	
M A Y	10	Tipppsy	Deepak Tijori	Deepak Tijori; Natasha Suri; Kainaat Arora; Nazia Hussain; Alankrita Sahai; Sonia Birje	Raju Chaddha Wave Cinemas, Alliance Productions India, Black Canvas	
M A Y	17	Kartam Bhugtam	Soham P. Shah	Shreyas Talpade; Vijay Raaz; Madhoo; Aksha Pardasany	Gandhar Films & Studio	
M A Y	24	Bhaiyya Ji	Apoorva Singh Karki	Manoj Bajpayee; Suvinder Vicky; Jatin Goswami; Vipin Sharma; Zoya Hussain	Bhanushali Studios, SSO Productions, Aurega Studios	
M A Y	31	Mr. & Mrs. Mahi	Sharan Sharma	Rajkummar Rao; Janhvi Kapoor	Zee Studios, Dharma Productions	
M A Y	31	Savi	Abhinay Deo	Anil Kapoor; Divya Khosla Kumar; Harshvardhan Rane	T-Series Films, Vishesh Entertainment, HWY 61	
M A Y	31	Chhota Bheem and the Curse of Damyaan	Rajiv Chilaka	Anupam Kher; Makrand Deshpande; Sanjay Bishnoi; Surbhi Tiwari; Yagya Bhasin	Green Gold Animation	
M A Y	31	Dedh Bigha Zameen	Pulkit	Pratik Gandhi; Khushalii Kumar	Karma Media and Entertainment, JioCinema	
M A Y	31	House of Lies	Saumitra Singh	Sanjay Kapoor; Ssmilley Suri; Simran Kaur Suri; Hiten Paintal	Sebhariya Pictures, Kaali Movies PVT. LTD, ZEE5	
J U N	7	Malhar (Note: The film was produced in both the Hindi and Marathi languages, according to the filmmakers.)	Vishal Kumbhar	Sharib Hashmi; Anjali Patil; Rishi Saxena; Mohammad Samad; Shrinivas Pokale	V Motion Pictures	
J U N	7	Bajrang Aur Ali	Jaiveer	Sachin Parikh; Gaurav Shankar	UtterUp Films	
J U N	7	Blackout	Devang Shashin Bhavsar	Vikrant Massey; Mouni Roy; Sunil Grover	Jio Studios, 11:11 Productions	
J U N	7	Munjya	Aditya Sarpotdar	Sharvari; Abhay Verma; Mona Singh	Maddock Films	
J U N	7	Phooli	Avinash Dhyani	Avinash Dhyani; Suruchi Saklani; Riya Baluni	Padma Siddhi Films, Dream Sky Creations	
J U N	14	Chandu Champion	Kabir Khan	Kartik Aaryan	Nadiadwala Grandson Entertainment, Kabir Khan Films	
J U N	14	Manihar	Sanjeev Kumar Rajput	Badrul Islam; Pankaj Berry	Jai Shree Movie Production	
J U N	14	Luv Ki Arrange Marriage	Ishrat R. Khan	Sunny Singh; Avneet Kaur; Annu Kapoor; Supriya Pathak; Rajpal Yadav	Bhanushali Studios Limited, Thinkink Picturez, ZEE5	
J U N	21	Ishq Vishk Rebound	Nipun Dharmadhikari	Rohit Saraf; Pashmina Roshan; Jibraan Khan; Naila Grrewal	Tips Industries	
J U N	21	Maharaj	Siddharth P. Malhotra	Junaid Khan; Jaideep Ahlawat; Shalini Pandey; Sharvari	YRF Entertainment, Netflix	
J U N	21	Hamare Baarah	Kamal Chandra	Annu Kapoor; Parth Samthaan; Manoj Joshi	Radhika G Film, Newtech Media Entertainment	
J U N	21	Pushtaini	Vinod Rawat	Vinod Rawat; Hemant Pandey; Shashi Bhushan	Lotus Dust Pictures	
J U N	21	Jahangir National University	Vinay Sharma	Siddharth Bodke; Urvashi Rautela; Rashami Desai; Piyush Mishra; Ravi Kishan	Mahakaal Movies	
J U N	28	Rautu Ka Raaz	Anand Surapur	Nawazuddin Siddiqui; Rajesh Kumar; Narayani Shastri; Atul Tiwari	Zee Studios, Phat Phish Records, ZEE5	
J U N	28	Sharmajee Ki Beti	Tahira Kashyap Khurana	Divya Dutta; Sakshi Tanwar; Saiyami Kher; Sharib Hashmi	Applause Entertainment, Ellipsis Entertainment, Amazon Prime Video	
J U N	28	Kooki	Pranab J Deka	Ritisha Khaund; Rajesh Tailang; Rina Rani; Dipannita Sharma; Devoleena Bhattacharjee	Niri Media Opc Private Limited, Jai Viratra Entertainment Limited	

== July–September ==
Opening		Title	Director	Cast	Studio (production house)	Ref.
J U L	5	Kill	Nikhil Nagesh Bhat	Lakshya; Raghav Juyal; Tanya Maniktala	Lionsgate, Roadside Attractions, Dharma Productions, Sikhya Entertainment	
J U L	10	Wild Wild Punjab	Simarpreet Singh	Varun Sharma; Sunny Singh; Manjot Singh; Jassie Gill; Patralekha Paul; Ishita Raj Sharma	T-Series Films, Luv Films, Netflix	
J U L	12	Sarfira	Sudha Kongara	Akshay Kumar; Paresh Rawal; Radhika Madan	Cape of Good Films, 2D Entertainment, Abundantia Entertainment	
J U L	12	Kakuda	Aditya Sarpotdar	Riteish Deshmukh; Sonakshi Sinha; Saqib Saleem	RSVP Movies, ZEE5	
J U L	19	Bad Newz	Anand Tiwari	Vicky Kaushal; Triptii Dimri; Ammy Virk; Neha Dhupia	Amazon MGM Studios, Dharma Productions, Leo Media Collective	
J U L	19	Accident or Conspiracy: Godhra	M.K Shivaaksh	Ranvir Shorey; Manoj Joshi	Om Trinetra Films, Artverse Studios	
J U L	26	Bloody Ishq	Vikram Bhatt	Avika Gor; Vardhan Puri	Hare Krishna Media Tech, Houseful Motion Pictures, Disney+ Hotstar	
J U L	26	Pride	Pankaj Kr Virat	Mimoh Chakraborty; Aishwarya Raj Bhakuni; Arif Zakaria	Omaks Productions	
A U G	2	Auron Mein Kahan Dum Tha	Neeraj Pandey	Ajay Devgn; Tabu; Jimmy Sheirgill; Shantanu Maheshwari; Saiee Manjrekar	Friday Filmworks, Panorama Studios, NH Studioz	
A U G	2	Ulajh	Sudhanshu Saria	Janhvi Kapoor; Gulshan Devaiah; Rajesh Tailang; Meiyang Chang; Roshan Mathew	Junglee Pictures	
A U G	9	Aliya Basu Gayab Hai	Preeti Singh	Vinay Pathak; Raima Sen; Salim Diwan	Rehab Pictures, Cinepolis India	
A U G	9	Phir Aayi Hasseen Dillruba	Jayprad Desai	Taapsee Pannu; Vikrant Massey; Sunny Kaushal; Jimmy Sheirgill	T-Series Films, Colour Yellow Productions	
A U G	9	Ghudchadi	Binoy Gandhi	Sanjay Dutt; Raveena Tandon; Parth Samthaan; Khushalii Kumar	T-Series Films, Keep Dreaming Pictures	
A U G	9	Ghuspaithiya	Susi Ganeshan	Urvashi Rautela; Vineet Kumar Singh; Akshay Oberoi	Suraj Production, 4V Entertainment, JDS Enterprises	
A U G	15	Khel Khel Mein	Mudassar Aziz	Akshay Kumar; Taapsee Pannu; Fardeen Khan; Vaani Kapoor; Ammy Virk; Pragya Jaiswal; Aditya Seal	T-Series Films, Wakaoo Films, White World Production	
A U G	15	Vedaa	Nikkhil Advani	John Abraham; Sharvari; Abhishek Banerjee; Ashish Vidyarthi	Zee Studios, Emmay Entertainment, JA Entertainment	
A U G	15	Stree 2	Amar Kaushik	Shraddha Kapoor; Rajkummar Rao; Aparshakti Khurana; Pankaj Tripathi; Abhishek Banerjee; |Tamannaah Bhatia| Maddock Films, Jio Studios		
A U G	23	Tikdam	Vivek Anchalia	Amit Sial; Arisht Jain; Aarohi Saud; Divyansh Dwivedi; Nayan Bhatt	Jio Studios, JioCinema	
A U G	30	A Wedding Story	Abhinav Pareek	Vaibhav Tatwawadi; Mukti Mohan; Lakshvir Singh Saran; Monica Chaudhary; Akshay Anand	Boundless Blackbuck Films Productions,1 Film Studio	
A U G	30	Pad Gaye Pange	Santosh Kumar	Samarpan Singh; Rajpal Yadav; Rajesh Sharma; Faisal Malik; Varsha Rekhate; Rrajesh Yadav	Prachi Films & Utter Action, Bright Outdoor Media	
S E P	6	Visfot	Kookie Gulati	Riteish Deshmukh; Fardeen Khan; Priya Bapat; Krystle D'Souza	White Feather Films, JioCinema	
S E P	13	The Buckingham Murders	Hansal Mehta	Kareena Kapoor Khan; Ash Tandon; Ranveer Brar; Keith Allen	Balaji Motion Pictures, Mahana Films	
S E P	13	Sector 36	Aditya Nimbalkar	Vikrant Massey; Deepak Dobriyal	Jio Studios, Maddock Films, Netflix	
S E P	13	Berlin	Atul Sabharwal	Ishwak Singh; Aparshakti Khurana; Rahul Bose; Anupriya Goenka; Kabir Bedi	Zee Studios, Yippee Ki Yay Motion Pictures, ZEE5	
S E P	15	Adbhut	Sabbir Khan	Nawazuddin Siddiqui; Diana Penty; Shreya Dhanwanthary; Rohan Mehra	Sony Pictures India, Sabbir Khan Films, Sony Max	
S E P	20	Kahan Shuru Kahan Khatam	Saurabh Dasgupta	Dhvani Bhanushali; Aashim Gulati; Supriya Pilgaonkar; Rakesh Bedi; Sonali Sachdev; Rajesh Sharma; Akhilendra Mishra; Chittranjan Tripathy; Vikram Kochhar; Himansh Kohli; Vikas Verma	Bhanushali Studios, Kathputli Creations	
S E P	20	Yudhra	Ravi Udyawar	Siddhant Chaturvedi; Malavika Mohanan; Raghav Juyal; Gajraj Rao; Ram Kapoor	Excel Entertainment	
S E P	20	Nasha Jurm Aur Gangsters	Rajkumar Patra	Rajkumar Patra; Rocky Rupkumar Patra; Yudi; Munni Pankaj; Abhijit Acharjee	Patras Glam Entertainment	
S E P	20	Jo Tera Hai Woh Mera Hai	Raj Trivedi	Paresh Rawal; Amit Sial; Faisal Malik; Sonali Kulkarni; Sonnalli Seygall	Jio Studios, JAR Pictures, JioCinema	
S E P	27	Love, Sitara	Vandana Kataria	Sobhita Dhulipala; Rajeev Siddhartha; Sonali Kulkarni; B. Jayashree; Virginia Rodrigues; Sanjay Bhutiani; Tamara D’Souza; Rijul Ray	RSVP Movies, ZEE5	
S E P	27	Binny And Family	Ssanjay Tripaathy	Anjini Dhawan; Pankaj Kapur; Rajesh Kumar; Charu Shankar; Himani Shivpuri; Naman Tripathy	Balaji Motion Pictures, Mahaveer Jain Films, Wave Band Productions	

== October–December ==
Opening		Title	Director	Cast	Studio (production house)	Ref.
O C T	4	CTRL	Vikramaditya Motwane	Ananya Panday; Vihaan Samat	Saffron Magicworks, Andolan Films, Travelin' Bone Entertainment, Netflix	
O C T	4	Amar Prem Ki Prem Kahani	Hardik Gajjar	Sunny Singh; Aditya Seal; Pranutan Bahl	Jio Studios, Hardik Gajjar Films, Backbenchers Pictures, JioCinema	
O C T	4	The Signature	Gajendra Ahire	Anupam Kher; Mahima Chaudhry; Neena Kulkarni; Annu Kapoor; Ranvir Shorey	Anupam Kher Studio, ZEE5	
O C T	11	Jigra	Vasan Bala	Alia Bhatt; Vedang Raina	Viacom18 Studios, Dharma Productions, Eternal Sunshine Productions	
O C T	11	Vicky Vidya Ka Woh Wala Video	Raaj Shaandilyaa	Rajkummar Rao; Triptii Dimri	T-Series Films, Balaji Motion Pictures, Wakaoo Films, Kathavachak Films, Thinkink Picturez	
O C T	18	Aayushmati Geeta Matric Pass	Prradip Khairwar	Kashika Kapoor; Anuj Saini; Atul Srivastav; Alka Amin	Good Idea Films, Spunk Productions	
O C T	25	Do Patti	Shashanka Chaturvedi	Kajol; Kriti Sanon; Shaheer Sheikh; Tanvi Azmi; Brijendra Kala; Vivek Mushran; Prachi Shah	Kathha Pictures, Blue Butterfly Films, Netflix	
O C T	25	Bandaa Singh Chaudhary	Abhishek Saxena	Arshad Warsi; Meher Vij	Arbaaz Khan Production, Seamless Productions LLP, 8 Aks Movies & Entertainment, Cinekorn Entertainment	
O C T	25	The Miranda Brothers	Sanjay Gupta	Harshvardhan Rane; Meezaan Jafri	White Feather Films, JioCinema	
O C T	25	Navras Katha Collage	Praveen Hingonia	Praveen Hingonia; Sheeba Chaddha; Rajesh Sharma; Alka Amin; Revathi Pillai	Swardhrupad Productions	
N O V	1	Bhool Bhulaiyaa 3	Anees Bazmee	Kartik Aaryan; Vidya Balan; Madhuri Dixit; Triptii Dimri	T-Series Films, Cine1 Studios	
N O V	1	Singham Again	Rohit Shetty	Ajay Devgn; Akshay Kumar; Ranveer Singh; Tiger Shroff; Kareena Kapoor Khan; Deepika Padukone; Arjun Kapoor; Jackie Shroff	Jio Studios, Reliance Entertainment, Cinergy, Devgn Films, Rohit Shetty Picturez	
N O V	8	Vijay 69	Akshay Roy	Anupam Kher; Chunky Panday; Mihir Ahuja	YRF Entertainment, Netflix	
N O V	8	Ella	Roshan Fernandes	Isha Talwar; Makarand Deshpande; Saranya Sharma	Prashu Land Films	
N O V	8	Khwaabon Ka Jhamela	Danish Aslam	Prateik Babbar; Sayani Gupta; Kubbra Sait	Jio Studios, Baweja Studios, JioCinema	
N O V	15	The Sabarmati Report	Dheeraj Sarna	Vikrant Massey; Raashii Khanna; Riddhi Dogra	Balaji Motion Pictures, Vikir Films	
N O V	22	Naam	Anees Bazmee	Ajay Devgn; Sameera Reddy; Bhumika Chawla; Rahul Dev	Snigdha Movies Pvt Ltd, Roongta Entertainment	
N O V	22	I Want to Talk	Shoojit Sircar	Abhishek Bachchan; Ahilya Bamroo; Johny Lever	Rising Sun Films, Kino Works	
N O V	29	Sikandar Ka Muqaddar	Neeraj Pandey	Jimmy Shergill; Tamannaah Bhatia; Avinash Tiwary	Friday Storytellers, Netflix	
D E C	6	Agni	Rahul Dholakia	Pratik Gandhi; Divyenndu; Saiyami Kher; Jitendra Joshi; Sai Tamhankar	Amazon MGM Studios, Excel Entertainment	
D E C	13	Zero Se Restart	Vidhu Vinod Chopra	Vikrant Massey; Medha Shankar; Anant V Joshi	Vinod Chopra Films	
D E C	13	Despatch	Kanu Behl	Manoj Bajpayee; Shahana Goswami	RSVP Movies, ZEE5	
D E C	20	Vanvaas	Anil Sharma	Nana Patekar; Utkarsh Sharma; Simrat Kaur; Rajpal Yadav	Zee Studios, Anil Sharma Productions	
D E C	20	OutHouse	Sunil Sukthankar	Sunil Abhyankar; Sharmila Tagore; Sonali Kulkarni; Mohan Agashe; Jihan Jeetendra Hodar	Dr. Mohan Agashe Studios	
D E C	25	Baby John	Kalees	Varun Dhawan; Keerthy Suresh; Wamiqa Gabbi; Jackie Shroff; Sanya Malhotra	Jio Studios, Cine1 Studios, A for Apple Productions	
D E C	25	Kisko Tha Pata	Ratnaa Sinha	Ashnoor Kaur; Akshay Oberoi; Aadil Khan	Zee Music Company	

== See also ==
- List of Hindi films
- List of Hindi films of 2023
- List of Hindi films of 2025
