= Tailang =

Tailang is a surname. Notable people with the surname include:

- Rajesh Tailang (born 1973), Indian actor
- Sudhir Tailang (1960–2016), Indian cartoonist
