= Vardhan Puri =

Indian actor

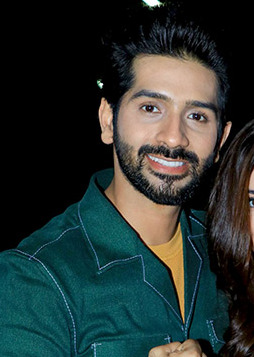
- Puri in 2019
- Born: 2 May 1990 (age 36); Mumbai, Maharashtra, India
- Occupation: Actor
- Years active: 2019–present
- Relatives: Amrish Puri (grandfather)

Vardhan Puri (born 2 May 1990) is an Indian actor who works in Hindi films. The grandson of actor Amrish Puri, he made his first screen appearance as an actor in the 2019 film Yeh Saali Aashiqui.

== Early life and background ==
Puri is the son of Rajeev Amrish Puri and Meena Rajeev Puri. He is the grandson of actor Amrish Puri. He completed his graduation from Narsee Monjee College of Commerce and Economics in 2011. He made his acting debut in the 2019 film Yeh Saali Aashiqui, starring Shivaleeka Oberoi. Puri worked as an assistant director for the films Daawat-e-Ishq, Shuddh Desi Romance and Ishaqzaade.

== Career ==
Puri made his acting debut with Yeh Saali Aashiqui in 2019, co-starring Shivaleeka Oberoi. Puri played dual roles of brothers Sahil Mehra and Surya Mehra. Nandini Ramnath of Scroll.in noted, "Vardhan Puri overtips his hand on occasion, but he is very convincing as the gullible trainee who is forced to confront the dark depths of the human soul." Devesh Sharma from Filmfare stated that Puri has potential to shine further as more projects come. For his performance in the film, Puri received Filmfare Award for Best Male Debut nomination.

After four years, Puri played Ronnie in Aseq alongside Sonnalli Seygall. Archika Khurana from Times of India opined that Puri plays his part well, but has an underdeveloped character.

== Filmography ==
=== Films ===
†	Denotes films that have not yet been released

Year	Title	Role	Notes	Ref.
2012	Ishaqzaade	—N/a	Assistant director	
2013	Shuddh Desi Romance	—N/a	Assistant director	
2014	Daawat-e-Ishq	—N/a	Assistant director	
2019	Yeh Saali Aashiqui	Sahil Mehra / Surya Mehra (Note: Puri played dual roles in the film.)	Also writer	
2023	Aseq	Ronnie		
2024	Dashmi	Sohail		
2024	Bloody Ishq	Romesh		
2025	Bobby Aur Rishi Ki Love Story	Rishi		
TBA	Nautanki †	TBA	Completed	

=== Music video appearances ===
Year	Title	Singer(s)	Ref.
2022	"O Raano Bura Na Mano"	Aditya Narayan	
2022	"Na Jaana Kahin Door"	Sonu Nigam	

== Awards and nominations ==
Year	Award	Category	Work	Result	Ref.
2020	Filmfare Awards	Best Male Debut	Yeh Saali Aashiqui	Nominated	
2020	Zee Cine Awards	Best Male Debut	Yeh Saali Aashiqui	Nominated	
