= Andaman =

Andaman may refer to:

- Andaman Islands, an island group in the Bay of Bengal
- Andaman Island, Penang, an artificial island in George Town, Penang
- Andaman Sea, a sea of the eastern Indian Ocean
- Andaman (1998 film), an Indian Kannada-language film
- Andaman (2016 film), an Indian Tamil-language romantic-comedy film
- Andaman (2021 film), an Indian Hindi-language film

== See also ==
- Andaman and Nicobar Islands, union territory of India
- Andamanese (disambiguation)
- Andaman Discoveries, a social enterprise in Thailand
