= Khuda Haafiz: Chapter 2 – Agni Pariksha =

2022 Indian film by Faruk Kabir

- Theatrical release poster
- Directed by: Faruk Kabir
- Written by: Faruk Kabir
- Produced by: Kumar Mangat Pathak; Abhishek Pathak; Sneha Bimal Parekh; Ram Mirchandani
- Starring: Vidyut Jammwal; Shivaleeka Oberoi; Sheeba Chaddha
- Cinematography: Jitan Harmeet Singh
- Edited by: Sandeep Francis
- Music by: Songs: Mithoon; Vishal Mishra; Shabbir Ahmed; Background Score: Amar Mohile
- Production companies: Panorama Studios; Action Hero Films; Cinergy
- Distributed by: Zee Studios
- Release date: 8 July 2022
- Running time: 149 minutes
- Country: India
- Language: Hindi
- Box office: ₹20.33 crore

Khuda Haafiz: Chapter 2 – Agni Pariksha (transl. May God be your protector: Chapter 2 – Trial by Fire), also known as Khuda Haafiz 2, is a 2022 Indian Hindi-language action thriller film directed by Faruk Kabir and produced under Panorama Studios, Action Hero Films and Cinergy. A sequel to the 2020 film Khuda Haafiz, Vidyut Jammwal and Shivaleeka Oberoi reprise their roles from the original film, while Rukhsar Rehman, Dibyendu Bhattacharya, Sheeba Chaddha, Riddhi Sharma, Bodhisattva Sharma, Anushka Marchande, Deepak Tokas, Asrar Khan and Mohammed Saud Mansuri appear in pivotal supporting roles.

Khuda Haafiz: Chapter 2 – Agni Pariksha was released theatrically on 8 July 2022 to mixed-to-positive reviews from critics.

== Plot ==
After busting down the flesh traders in Noman (Note: As shown in Khuda Haafiz), Sameer Chaudhary returns to India with his wife Nargis, who battles depression and PTSD after the Noman incident. One year later, the couple tries to find their new normal life, but are seen to be struggling despite therapy and medicines. Sameer's best friend Deepak loses his brother and sister-in-law in a car accident, leaving their 5-year-old daughter Nandini as the lone survivor. Due to his travelling sales job, Deepak decides to put Nandini in an adoption home as he would not be able to care for her.

Sameer suggests that he and Nargis take Nandini in for a week before Deepak decides anything as he hoped that Nargis would bond with Nandini and finally be able to come out of her depression. Nargis is unhappy with the new addition at first, but with the help of her therapist, takes the first step towards Nandini soon after. An accident with a dog bite causes Nargis to react and put herself into harm's way to save Nandini. She soon starts to form a bond with the little girl and some time later, the couple officially adopt Nandini. However, their happiness is short-lived as Basheshwar "Bacchu" Thakur, who is the grandson of a powerful lady Sheela Thakur, forces his crush and Nandini's friend Seema to accept his feelings for her, but Seema rejects him.

Enraged, Bacchu, along with his two friends Shailendra and Abhinav kidnaps Seema and Nandini, who tried to help the elder girl. Sameer and Seema's family reaches out to the police for help, but the police doesn't write down their FIR as Sheela is too powerful in the region. After an entire day of searching with the help of the ice-cream vendor, Sameer finally reaches the area, where Bacchu and his friends had lit the kidnapping van on fire. Searching nearby in the fields reveals the two girls – brutally injured. They're rushed to the hospital and everyone realize that both have been assaulted. Nandini is unable to survive her injuries and this shatters Sameer and Nargis, who gets angry and leaves Sameer after telling him to meet her after avenging Nandini's death.

Sameer thrashes Inspector Tyagi for not helping to find Nandini, where he is sentenced to prison for 60 days. At the prison, Talha Ansari's informer informs him that Rashid Qasai send Jaiswal and his goons to kill Sameer. At night, Talha provides weapons for Sameer and reveals about Jaiswal's plans to kill him. In the morning, Sameer kills Jaiswal and his goons with the help of Talha. In the hospital, Seema gains consciousness and reveals about Bachchu and his friends for abusing Seema and Nandini to the news channels. Sheela Thakur warns Nargis to stay away from Bachchu for Sameer after trying to scare her by repeating Nargis' own scary experiences. Despite her fears, Nargis remains cool and collected in front of Sheela and tells her that even if something does happen to Sameer in his quest for vengeance, then she would be still alive.

Talha asks for help from his uncle to release Sameer and Sameer gets released from prison. Khalu tells Sameer that Rashid knows where Bachchu two's friends are hidden. Sameer joins hands with Khalu and Saaharsh to eliminate Rashid and his men in the alleyway and they find Bachchu's friends Shailendra and Abhinav. Shailendra is scared and immediately reveals everything requesting amnesty. He tells the gang that how Bachchu and Shardul abused Seema repeatedly, while Abhinav was the one who abused the little Nandini. The boys then took the girls into the very field and hunted them around, hitting them repeatedly with a cricket bat until they collapsed.

Shailendra also revealed that the murder was actually Sheela's plan, where she ordered the butcher to hide everyone and sent Bachchu abroad with his father Kamlesh. Sameer and Seema's brother Saaharsh learn about the crimes against the girls and get enraged, where Sameer brutally thrashes Abhinav to death. The police and media find Abhinav's naked body hanging from a tree in the morning. SSP Avinash Thakur, who is hired for the case due to media attention, takes Shailendra into custody and gives information about Bachchu to Sameer. Avinash explains that Bachchu and his father are in Egypt and India doesn't have an extradition treaty in place. While a request has been raised with the Foreign Ministry, everything would take months due to bureaucracy.

However, Avinash points out that there were no such restrictions on Sameer and Saaharsh. Sameer and Saaharsh board to Egypt and locate Kamlesh and Bachchu's location with the help of Hasnain, an arms dealer in a local market. The three attack and eliminate Kamlesh's henchmen's and chase them in a desert road of Pyramid, which leads to the car chase. After crashing Bachchu's car, Sameer drags Bachchu out of the burning car and starts thrashing him brutally. Kamlesh tries to intervene, where Saaharsh starts fighting with Bachchu and Sameer puts Kamlesh down. Sameer finally kills Bachchu, while Saaharsh shoots Kamlesh, thus avenging Nandini's death and Seema's assault.

Sheela Thakur mourns the death of Bachchu, while her henchmen tries to keep the police from getting arrested. Sheela Thakur then grabs a hold of the woman she kept captive in her home and sexually abused. The woman finally gathers her courage and stabs Sheela to death with her hairpin. Sameer wakes up at home and Nargis is revealed to be pregnant, much to Sameer's surprise. Everyone from outside the house praises Sameer as their leader. Sameer sees Nandini in the crowd and they both wave at each other.

== Cast ==
- Vidyut Jammwal as Sameer Chaudhary
- Shivaleeka Oberoi as Nargis Chaudhary
- Dibyendu Bhattacharya as Rashid Qasai
- Sheeba Chaddha as Thakur Ji a.k.a. Sheela Thakurji, Bachchu's grandmother
- Rajesh Tailang as Ravi Kumar, a reporter
- Rukhsar Rehman as Dr. Roshni Acharya
- Riddhi Sharma as Nandini Chaudhary: Sameer and Nargis adopted daughter
- Bodhisattva Sharma as Basheshwar "Bachchu" Thakur, Sheela Thakurji's grandson
- Anushka Marchande as Seema
- Deepak Tokas as Deepak, Sameer's best friend
- Mohammed Saud Mansuri as Abhinav, Bachchu's friend
- Pawan Chopra as SSP Avinash Thakur
- Abhishek Andrews as Sanu
- Danish Husain as Talha Ansari
- Monica Sharma as Kalki
- Anurekha Bhagat as maid of Sameer and Nargis
- Sidharth Bhardwaj as Khalu
- Asrar Khan as Yadav Ji "Thakur Ji's Secretary"
- Maira Khan as Nandini's friend
- Ritik Ghanshani as Saaharsh, Seema's Brother

== Production ==
Principal photography began on 22 July 2021 in Lucknow.

== Soundtrack ==
Khuda Haafiz – Chapter 2 Agni Pariksha

Soundtrack album by Mithoon, Vishal Mishra and Shabbir Ahmed
- Released: 29 June 2022
- Recorded: 2021–2022
- Genre: Feature film soundtrack
- Length: 16:50
- Language: Hindi
- Label: Zee Music Company

Official audio
- Khuda Haafiz 2 – Full Album on YouTube

The film's music the film is composed by Mithoon, Vishal Mishra and Shabbir Ahmed, while the lyrics are written by Manoj Muntashir, Mithoon, Vishal Mishra, Kaushal Kishore, Faruk Kabir, Shabbir Ahmed and Ayaz Kohli. The background score is composed by Amar Mohile.

The song "Junoon Hai" is dedicated to Hussain ibn Ali, the son of Ali and grandson of the Islamic prophet Muhammad who was martyred at the battle of Karbala, and is based on marsiya poems which commemorate the event. It was initially titled "Haq Hussain" and objections were raised by Shia Muslims over its title and use in the film during violent action scenes which also depict the mourning of Muharram (Shia rituals on Ashura – the tenth day of the month of Muharram commemorating the martyrdom of Hussain). Panorama Studio, the producers of the film, subsequently issued an apology and changed the title of the song and associated lyrics, which nonetheless retains references to Ali.

Track listing
No.	Title	Lyrics	Music	Singer(s)	Length
1.	"Chaiyaan Mein Saiyaan Ki"	Mithoon	Mithoon	Jubin Nautiyal, Asees Kaur, Keshav Anand	4:05
2.	"Rubaru"	Manoj Muntashir	Vishal Mishra	Vishal Mishra, Asees Kaur, Niazi Nizami Brothers	4:21
3.	"Junoon Hai"	Shabbir Ahmed, Ayaz Kohli	Shabbir Ahmed	Saaj Bhatt, Brijesh Shandilya, Anis Ali Sabri,	4:44
4.	"Aaja Ve"	Vishal Mishra, Kaushal Kishore, Faruk Kabir	Vishal Mishra	Vishal Mishra	3:40
Total length:					16:50

== Release ==
The film was initially scheduled to release on 17 June 2022, but was postponed. The film was theatrically released on 8 July 2022.

=== Home media ===
The film premiered on ZEE5 on 2 September 2022.

== Reception ==
Khuda Haafiz: Chapter 2 – Agni Pariksha received mixed-to-positive reviews from critics.

=== Critical response ===
On the review aggregator website Rotten Tomatoes, 17% of 6 critics' reviews are positive, with an average rating of 4.5/10.

Dhaval Roy of The Times of India gave 3.5/5 stars and wrote "Khuda Haafiz 2 is worth a watch for the heavy-duty action and the story that's high on emotion." Zinia Bandyopadhyay of News18 gave 3.5/5 stars and wrote "If you have loved Khuda Haafiz and want to see Vidyut the actor, this film is for you."

Shaheen Irani of OTTplay gave 3.5/5 stars and wrote "It is a commercial entertainer with all real elements that make you uncomfortable but need to be spoken about." Grace Cyril of India Today gave 3/5 stars and wrote "Khuda Haafiz — literally means May God be your Guardian — does not have the most innovative script but it will still touch your heart."

Bollywood Hungama gave 2/5 stars and wrote "Khuda Haafiz: Chapter 2 – Agni Pariksha fails to reach the level of the first part and disappoints due to the predictable storyline and disturbing action scenes." Namrata Thakker of Rediff gave 2/5 stars and wrote "Khuda Haafiz 2 comes across as an unnecessary sequel that has been made just to showcase Vidyut in action mode."

Anuj Kumar of The Hindu wrote "Faruk Kabir's sequel to his 2020 actioner is gripping, and not divorced from socio-political realities." Anupama Chopra of Film Companion wrote "Khuda Haafiz 2 – Agni Pariksha functions most effectively as a gore test — meaning the film serves as a barometer of how much brutality you can watch without flinching."
