= Yeh Saali Aashiqui =

2019 Indian film by Cherag Ruparel

- Theatrical release poster
- Directed by: Cherag Ruparel
- Written by: Vardhan-Cherag
- Produced by: Rajeev Amrish Puri; Dr. Meena Rajeev Puri; Dhaval Jayantilal Gada; Akshay Jayantilal Gada
- Starring: Vardhan Puri; Shivaleeka Oberoi
- Cinematography: Pratik Shah
- Edited by: Anirban Dutta
- Music by: Hitesh Modak
- Production companies: Amrish Puri Films; Pen Studios
- Distributed by: Pen Marudhar Entertainment
- Release date: 29 November 2019
- Running time: 127 minutes
- Country: India
- Language: Hindi

Yeh Saali Aashiqui (transl. Damn this love) is an Indian Hindi-language romantic thriller film. The film is directed by Cherag Ruparel and produced by Jayantilal Gada & Amrish Puri Films. The film stars debutantes Vardhan Puri, grandson of Amrish Puri, and Shivaleeka Oberoi. The film was initially scheduled to be released on 22 November 2019. but later postponed by one week to 29 November 2019.

== Plot ==
Three years ago, Sahil Mehra and Mittee Deora met at a hotel management college in Shimla and fell in love. Due to Sahil's broken trust, they break up. He finds Mittee cheating in exams and complains about it. Mittee's friend told her that Sahil complained about it. Mittee asks Sahil for a last chance after she fakes fainting in her room. Sahil develops a cold shoulder and forgives her. Mittee hurts herself and then makes a scenario as if Sahil tried to rape her and tells this to her professor. Sahil is proven mentally ill and is sent to a mental hospital. when he was mentally fit.

In the present, Sahil has shown improvement and wants to get out but cannot. His identical twin (killer) brother, Surya Mehra, comes in to get some signatures from him. Sahil knocks down Surya and gets out. he starts searching for Mittee for Revenge. Mittee is now in a relationship with Anuj Mathur. Then Sahil attacks her multiple times to scare her with the help of Mittee's friend Kavita. Anuj listens to her they go to the mental asylum to find Surya in it but they mistake Surya for Sahil. Anuj gets angry because of repeated Sahil's words from Mittee and warns her to take his name again. Sahil gets to know that Mittee and Anuj are getting engaged and will soon marry each other. He makes a video and projects it on the engagement day. That video showcased how many more she cheated and their stories in their voices. Everyone gets to know about her real character and Anuj calls off the Engagement. Mittee's father gets an attack and her mother tells Mittee to go away from their life.

Sahil calls Mittee to the hospital where her parents are. they both have a huge tiff and Mittee runs around trying to shoot Sahil but misses every time. She finally shoots Sahil in her parents' room with the last bullet. Sahil was still breathing and Mittee took a huge cylinder and hit Sahil multiple times to kill him on the spot. Mittee's parents watch her kill Sahil. Police arrested Mittee and Sahil was pronounced dead. Mittee was given a life sentence.

Surya comes to meet Mittee to thank her for killing Sahil. On the way back she heard the sound of a whistle which she knew that only Sahil could play. She realized that the one who died was Surya. Sahil got Surya out of mental asylum and told him to wait in Mittee's Parent's room. The one who came to meet Mittee was Sahil who hid after getting Mittee to chase him to her parents' room and Mittee killed Surya thinking it was Sahil.

== Cast ==
- Vardhan Puri in a dual role as Sahil Mehra and Surya Mehra
- Shivaleeka Oberoi as Mitee Deora
- Ruslaan Mumtaz as Anuj Mathur
- Ashok Chhabra as Chacha
- Amit Arora as Priyank Sharma
- Jesse Lever as Venu
- Pulkit Bangia as Jehan Vevaina
- Deepansha Dhingra as Kavita Malhotra, Mitee's friend
- Jasvant Singh as Nanu
- Sanjeev Johri as Doctor Irani
- Pankaj kumar as Student
- Yudhvir Dahiya as Doctor Jha
- Satish Kaushik as Chenu Babu (Cameo appearance)

== Release ==
The official trailer of the film was unveiled by Pen India Limited on 5 November 2019. It was originally titled Paagal (Mad), but the title was changed as demanded by the Central Board of Film Certification, likely due negative associations of the term in the context of mental health issues; following in the heels of Mental Hai Kya, whose title change was demanded by the Indian Psychiatric Society.

== Soundtrack ==
Yeh Saali Aashiqui

Soundtrack album by Hitesh Modak
- Released: 16 November 2019
- Genre: Feature film soundtrack
- Length: 11:18
- Language: Hindi
- Label: Sony Music India

This music of the film is composed by Hitesh Modak with lyrics written by Tanveer Ghazi.

Track listening
No.	Title	Singer	Length
1.	"Havaa Banke"	Armaan Malik	4:32
2.	"Sanki"	Arun HK	3:23
3.	"Bewaqoofi"	Armaan Malik, Hitesh Modak	3:23
4.	"Sanki (Rap)"	Parry G	2:08
Total length:			11:18

== Accolades ==
Year	Award	Category	Recipient(s)	Result
2020	Filmfare Awards	Best Male Debut	Vardhan Puri	Nominated
2020	Filmfare Awards	Best Female Debut	Shivaleeka Oberoi	Nominated
