= Siddharth (2013 film) =

2013 film

- Film poster
- Directed by: Richie Mehta
- Written by: Maureen Dorey; Rajesh Tailang; Richie Mehta
- Produced by: Stephen N. Bray; Richie Mehta; David Miller
- Starring: Rajesh Tailang; Tannishtha Chatterjee
- Cinematography: Bob Gundu
- Edited by: Stuart McIntyre; Richie Mehta
- Music by: Andrew Lockington
- Production companies: Poor Man's Productions; Wonderland India
- Distributed by: Zeitgeist Films; Pinnacle Films
- Release date: 10 September 2013 (TIFF)
- Running time: 96 minutes
- Countries: India; Canada
- Language: Hindi

Siddharth is a 2013 Indian-Canadian drama film directed by Richie Mehta. It was screened in the Contemporary World Cinema section at the 2013 Toronto International Film Festival. It depicts the story of a man who sends his son to work in a distant land for money who later goes missing.

It was notably screened under the "Informative Screening (Feature)" film category at the 2014 Pyongyang International Film Festival in North Korea.

== Plot ==
A man from Delhi goes out to find his missing son and expects that whoever took him will return him unharmed.

== Cast ==
- Rajesh Tailang as Mahendra Saini
- Tannishtha Chatterjee as Suman Saini
- Anurag Arora as Ranjit Gahlot
- Shobha Sharma Jassi as Meena Gahlot
- Geeta Agarwal Sharma as Roshni
- Amitabh Srivasta as Om Prakash
- Mukesh Chhabra as Mukesh Bhai
- Khushi Mathur as Pinky Saini
- Irfan Khan as Siddharth / Chai Kid / Kamathipura Child
- Salony Luthra as Train Enquiry Lady
