= Aseq =

2023 film directed by Sarim Momin

- Official release poster
- Directed by: Sarim Momin
- Written by: Gauri Karnik; Sarim Momin
- Produced by: Jyoti Deshpande; Mohaan Nadaar
- Starring: Vardhan Puri; Sonnalli Seygall; Siddhanth Kapoor
- Cinematography: Naren Gediaa
- Edited by: Shaju Chandran
- Music by: Yug Bhusal
- Production companies: Jio Studios; Stone Circle Productions; The Production Headquarters
- Distributed by: JioCinema
- Release date: 23 June 2023
- Running time: 107 minutes
- Country: India
- Language: Hindi

Aseq is a 2023 Indian Hindi-language horror thriller written and directed by Sarim Momin. Produced under the banner of Jio Studios, it features Vardhan Puri, Sonnalli Seygall and Siddhanth Kapoor. It was released for streaming on 23 June 2023, on JioCinema.

== Cast ==
- Vardhan Puri as Ronnie
- Sonnalli Seygall as Lail
- Siddhanth Kapoor as Sarim
- Elena Fernandes as Priyanka
- Adi Chugh as Aadi
- Emma Kaler
- Julian Gillard

== Production ==
The film was announced by Jio Studios featuring Vardhan Puri, Sonnalli Seygall and Siddhanth Kapoor. The principal photography of the film started in 2022 and was wrapped in 2023.

== Soundtrack ==
Aseq

Soundtrack album by Veer Pandya and Yug Bhusal
- Released: 2023
- Genre: Feature film soundtrack
- Length: 9:02
- Language: Hindi
- Label: Times Music

The film's music is composed by Veer Pandya and Yug Bhusal.

Track listing
| No. | Title | Music | Singer(s) | Length |
|---|---|---|---|---|
| 1. | "Alvida" | Veer Pandya | Veer Pandya | 3:01 |
| 2. | "Friendship" | Yug Bhusal | Himanshu Kohli | 2:59 |
| 3. | "Tu Mila Hai" | Yug Bhusal | Himanshu Kohli | 3:02 |
| Total length: | | | | 9:02 |

== Reception ==
Pooja Darade of Leisure Byte rated the film 1/5 stars. Archika Khurana of Times of india gave the film 2/5 stars.
