= Abhishek Pathak =

Indian filmmaker (born 1987)

- Born: Abhishek Pathak; 1 July 1987 (age 39); Mumbai, Maharashtra, India
- Occupations: Film producer; director; screenwriter
- Spouse: Shivaleeka Oberoi Pathak (m. 2023)
- Parents: Kumar Mangat Pathak (father); Neelam Pathak (mother)
- Family: Amita Pathak (sister)

Abhishek Pathak (born July 1, 1987) is an Indian filmmaker who works in Hindi films. He has directed films such as Drishyam 2 and Ujda Chaman. He has also produced films such as Pyaar Ka Punchnama, Pyaar Ka Punchnama 2, Section 375 and Khuda Haafiz.

== Early and personal life ==
Pathak is the son of film producer Kumar Mangat Pathak, who has long been associated as a talent manager with actor and producer Ajay Devgn, and has co-produced each of Devgn's production ventures. He completed his schooling at Mithibai College, Mumbai and studied filmmaking at the New York Film Academy. He has produced several films under his father's production company Panorama Studios, beginning with the sleeper hit Pyaar Ka Punchnama (2011). In 2019, he made his directorial debut with the comedy Ujda Chaman. In 2022, he directed Drishyam 2, a sequel to Drishyam (2015). He married actress Shivaleeka Oberoi Pathak in February 2023, having produced her films Khuda Haafiz (2020) and its sequel Khuda Haafiz: Chapter 2 – Agni Pariksha (2022).

== Filmography ==
=== Director ===
Year	Film
2019	Ujda Chaman
2022	Drishyam 2
2026	Drishyam: The Conclusion

=== Writer ===
Year	Film
2022	Drishyam 2
2026	Drishyam: The Conclusion

=== Producer ===
Year	Film
2011	Pyaar Ka Punchnama
2012	Bittoo Boss
2013	Aatma
2013	Akaash Vani
2015	Pyaar Ka Punchnama 2
2015	Drishyam
2015	Alone
2017	Guest in London
2018	Raid
2019	Pagalpanti
2019	Ujda Chaman
2019	Section 375
2019	Singham
2020	Khuda Haafiz
2021	Dybbuk
2022	Drishyam 2
2022	Daman
2022	Khuda Haafiz: Chapter 2 – Agni Pariksha
2023	Hu ane Tu
2024	Phullwanti
2024	Shaitaan
2025	Maharani
2025	Raid 2
2026	Drishyam: The Conclusion
