= Dahan (TV series) =

Indian Supernatural thriller television series

- Also known as: Bhay
- Genre: Supernatural; Horror
- Written by: Jai Sharma; Nikhil Nair; Shiva Bajpai
- Directed by: Mohit Shandilya
- Starring: Tisca Chopra; Saurabh Shukla; Ankur Nayyar; Rajesh Tailang; Rohan Joshi; Mukesh Tiwari
- Country of origin: India
- Original language: Hindi
- No. of seasons: 1
- No. of episodes: 9 (18)

Production
- Producers: Mahesh Korade; Deepak Dhar; Rishi Negi
- Cinematography: Arkodeb Mukherjee
- Production company: Banijay Asia

Original release
- Network: Disney+ Hotstar
- Release: 16 September 2022

Dahan: Raakan Ka Rahasya (also known as Bhay) is an Indian Hindi-language supernatural horror television series directed by Vikranth Pawar, it stars Tisca Chopra, Saurabh Shukla, Rohan Joshi, Rajesh Tailang in an ensemble cast of actors. The series premiered on Disney+Hotstar on 16 September 2022. It became the most watched series on OTT by October 2022.

The series started re-airing on Disney+ Hotstar in November 2023 as Bhay with each episode releasing on a daily basis at 2am.

== Cast ==
- Tisca Chopra as Avni Raut
- Saurabh Shukla as Swaroop (Pramukh Ji)
- Pankaj Sharma as Sachet
- Rohan Joshi as Anay Raut
- Ankur Nayyar as Sandeep
- Rajesh Tailang as Parimal Singh
- Mukesh Tiwari as CI Bhairon Singh
- Hima Singh
- Siddharth Bhardwaj
- Lehar Khan as Rani

== Series overview ==
Season	No. of episodes	Broadcast on (India)	
Season	No. of episodes	First aired	Last aired
1	9	16 September 2022	
1	18	6 November 2023	29 November 2023
