= Nirmal Pathak Ki Ghar Wapsi =

Indian drama series

- Genre: Drama
- Created by: Naren Kumar
- Written by: Rahul Pandey
- Directed by: Rahul Pandey & Satish Nair
- Starring: Vaibhav Tatwawadi; Alka Amin; Vineet Kumar
- Country of origin: India
- Original language: Hindi
- No. of seasons: 1
- No. of episodes: 5

Production
- Producers: Naren Kumar & Mahesh Korade
- Cinematography: Girish
- Editor: Kunal Walve
- Running time: 30-45 minutes
- Production company: Kyra Kumar Kreations

Original release
- Network: SonyLIV
- Release: 27 May 2022

Nirmal Pathak Ki Ghar Wapsi is an Indian family-drama web series on SonyLIV. It revolves around the lead character Nirmal Pathak who visits his home for the first time after many years and witnesses a whirlwind of emotions. This is a story of a young man who is on a journey to find his roots. Written by Rahul Pandey and created by Naren Kumar. The series stars Vaibhav Tatwawadi, Alka Amin, and Vineet Kumar in lead roles and is produced by Naren Kumar and Mahesh Korade.

== Plot ==
When Nirmal Pathak was three years old, his father left the village and moved to New Delhi with him. Nirmal returns to his roots 24 years later, now as an adult. He falls in love with his village but unfortunately, within a few days, he is confronted with the harsh reality of village life. He realizes why his father, Mohan Pathak, had left 24 years before.

== Cast ==
- Vaibhav Tatwawadi as Nirmal Pathak
- Alka Amin as Santoshi Pathak (Nirmal's birth mother)
- Vineet Kumar as Netaji
- Garima Vikrant Singh as Genda Bua
- Ishita Ganguly as Geetanjali
- Pankaj Jha as Makhanlal Chacha
- Akash Makhija as Aatish
- Kumar Saurabh as Lablabiya
- Meenakshi Chugh as Arti Devi Dubey ( Netaji's Wife)
- Aaradhya Tiwari as Kanya Pathak (Genda Bua Daughter)
- Avyaan Tiwari as Kittu

== Episodes ==
Episode 1

Nirmal Pathak, who was born in Bihar and raised in New Delhi, returns to his hometown after 24 years. His family, eagerly anticipating his return, believes Nirmal has returned to join them for his cousin Aatish's wedding.

Episode 2

Nirmal falls in love with his village and begins journaling his adventures, but his mother's questions about her husband make him uneasy. Nirmal ends up promising to the entire family that in the morning, and he will make everyone speak to his father.

Episode 3

Slowly, the dirty layers of village life start peeling off and Nirmal starts noticing the stark realities of his village. He begins to understand why his father Mohan Pathak had left the village 24 years back. Now, he finds himself in the same situation.

Episode 4

In the midst of doing the right thing, Nirmal's relationships get strained. Nirmal has already had a spat with his uncle, but his actions are also making Aatish uncomfortable.

Episode 5

Nirmal becomes so engrossed in the fight for the right thing that the entire family becomes divided, either being Netaji, Aatish, or his uncle.

== Release ==
The web series was released on 27 May 2022, exclusively on SonyLIV.

== Reception ==
The Times Of India wrote, "A delightful and heart-warming series that captures the essence of rural India."

Sunidhi Prajapat of OTTPlay wrote, "Vaibhav Tatwawaadi has shone in the titular character. From his dialogue delivery to making the audience feel the emotion of his character, he actually seems more like Nirmal than himself."

Firstpost wrote "Nirmal Pathak ki Ghar Wapsi is not a slice-of-life narrative by any stretch - it’s possibly the very opposite of what we deem as a ‘comfort watch’ these days, and that's where the comparisons with Panchayat end."

Shubham Kulkarni of Koimoi wrote, "There is enough heart, soul and awareness in here to make you feel warm and aware at the same time."

The series was recognized at the 2022 Dallas Fort Worth South Asian Film Festival (DFWSAFF), where it won Best Television Series, and lead actor Vaibhav Tatwawadi was awarded Best Actor.
