= Badtameez Gill =

Hindi comedy movie

- Directed by: Navjot Gulati
- Produced by: Saga Films
- Starring: Vaani Kapoor; Aparshakti Khurana; Paresh Rawal; Sheeba Chaddha; Monica Chaudhary
- Cinematography: Piyush Puty
- Production company: Saga Films
- Country: India
- Language: Hindi

Badtameez Gill is an unreleased Indian Hindi-language comedy drama film directed by Navjot Gulati. Produced under Saga Films, it stars Vaani Kapoor, Aparshakti Khurana, Paresh Rawal, Sheeba Chaddha, Richard Bhakti Klein, and Monica Chaudhary.

== Cast ==
- Vaani Kapoor
- Aparshakti Khurana
- Paresh Rawal
- Sheeba Chaddha
- Monica Chaudhary
- Ishita Raj
- Richard Bhakti Klein

== Production ==
The film was announced in May 2024. Principal photography commenced the same month. The film was mainly shot in Bareilly and London before wrapping in July 2024.
