= Andamanese (disambiguation) =

Andamanese may refer to:

- anything from, or related to, the Andaman Islands, an archipelago in the Indian Ocean
- Andamanese people, the various indigenous people of the islands
- Andamanese languages, several indigenous language families of the islands

== See also ==
- Andaman (disambiguation)
- Great Andamanese, ethnic group in the Andaman Islands
