= Ujda Chaman =

- Theatrical release poster
- Directed by: Abhishek Pathak
- Written by: Danish J. Singh
- Based on: Ondu Motteya Kathe by Raj B. Shetty
- Produced by: Kumar Mangat Pathak; Abhishek Pathak
- Starring: Sunny Singh; Maanvi Gagroo; Saurabh Shukla; Karishma Sharma
- Cinematography: Sudhir K. Chaudhary
- Edited by: Ritesh Soni
- Music by: Songs: Gourov - Roshin; Guru Randhawa; Score: Hitesh Sonik; Amar Mohile
- Production company: Panorama Studios
- Distributed by: Panorama Studios; PVR Pictures; Glamour Eyes Films; Anand Pandit Motion Pictures
- Release date: 1 November 2019
- Running time: 120 minutes
- Country: India
- Language: Hindi
- Budget: ₹12 crore
- Box office: est. ₹12.61 crore

Ujda Chaman (transl. Destroyed Garden) is a 2019 Indian Hindi-language comedy-drama film directed and produced by Abhishek Pathak along with produced by Kumar Mangat Pathak under the Panorama Studios banner. Starring Sunny Singh, Maanvi Gagroo, Saurabh Shukla, Karishma Sharma and Aishwarya Sakhuja, it is an official remake of the 2017 Kannada dramedy film Ondu Motteya Kathe. It was theatrically released in India on 1 November 2019.

The film is about a balding 30-year-old bachelor who is in search of a wife and is given a deadline to find one or remain celibate forever.

== Plot ==
A 30-year balding Hindi lecturer, Chaman Kohli searches desperately for a suitable girl to marry after his family astrologer warns him that if he doesn't get married before his 31st birthday, then he'll have to spend his whole life in celibacy. He confides in his friend who also happens to be the clerk of the college. He advises him to go and search for a bridesmaid at a wedding as that's where many relationships are formed. Chaman tries to woo a girl at his friend's wedding but later discovers her making out with his brother Goldie. He tries to ask his colleagues out on the clerk's advice but they also deny saying they've got their respective boyfriends.

Chaman tries to solve the problem by using a wig, but when his bluff is exposed, he leaves in disgust. A first year student, Aaina, comes to him and consoles him for his mockery by other students. She befriends him and hangs out with him only to get hold of the exam questions. Goldie sees Aaina and Chaman together and tells the family about them making them very happy. She later becomes very indifferent towards him and refuses to even talk. Chaman finds solace on Tinder and meets Apsara, a make up artist but oversized girl. Both of them instantly dislike each other because of their looks and the edited pictures they uploaded but agree on being friends as an excuse to leave the date. Later Chaman offers to drop Apsara and both end up having an accident. In hospital their families bond well and assume them a couple. They set their Roka ceremony much to Chaman's chagrin, but Apsara starts falling for him. She posts their picture on Facebook which becomes a laughing stock for students who post hate comments, making Chaman really upset. He asks Apsara to delete it when she tries hard to explain to him that people will say some or the other thing but he shouldn't react on everything and accept himself the way he is.

On their engagement, Chaman texts Apsara that he is not happy with this union and she takes the blame on herself calling off the ceremony. Chaman sulks in private and the clerk notices this and takes him to dinner at his place. He introduces him to his wife who is mute and yet how happy they are as a couple. Later Chaman starts dating a colleague who earlier rejected him. She asks him to meet his parents by wearing his wig. This gives Chaman an epiphany of how honest and pure Apsara was, as she accepted him for his inner beauty and not his debonair looks. He goes and apologises to her and they are seen living happily together.

== Cast ==
- Sunny Singh as Chaman Kohli
- Maanvi Gagroo as Apsara Batra
- Saurabh Shukla as Guru Ji
- Atul Kumar as Shashi Kohli
- Grusha Kapoor as Sushma Kohli
- Gagan Arora as Goldy Kohli
- Rajendra Chawla as Mr. Batra
- Suparna Marwah as Mrs. Batra
- Karishma Sharma as Aaina
- Abhilash Chaudhary as Rathi
- Pankhuri Gidwani as Reema
- Aishwarya Sakhuja as Ekta
- Sharib Hashmi as Raj Kumar
- Anushka Kaushik as Apsara's sister (uncredited)

== Production ==
Ujda Chaman has been shot in New Delhi, Noida & Ghaziabad. Hansraj College (University of Delhi), Red Fort (Lal Quila), India Gate, Gali Lalten Wali (Azad Market), Vinobapuri, Central Market (Lajpat Nagar), Dilli Haat, Mehrauli, Hauz Khas Village, Sector 30 (Noida) & Yashoda Hospital Ghaziabad.

== Marketing and release ==
The first look poster of the film was released on 1 October and, on the same day, the trailer was also released by Panorama Studios. The film was released on 1 November 2019.

== Reception ==
=== Critical response ===
Ujda Chaman received generally mixed to positive reviews from critics;

Filmfare gave 2.5 stars out of 5 and said, 'Overall, while the film does raise some important issues, it suffers from faulty execution. It comes across as a missed opportunity at best...' Komal Nahta of Film Information said, 'Ujda Chaman is definitely not the laugh riot it ought to have been and is, in that sense, a very disappointing fare.' Bollywood Hungama gave 2 stars out of 5 and said 'Ujda Chaman has a promising and relatable story but the inconsistent execution and predictable narrative spoils the show.'

=== Box office ===
Ujda Chaman's opening day domestic collection was ₹2.35 crore. On the second day, the film collected ₹3.30 crore. On the third day, the film collected ₹3.61 crore, taking total opening weekend collection to ₹9.29 crore.

As of 9 November 2019, with a gross of ₹12.07 crore in India and ₹91 lacs overseas, the film has a worldwide gross collection of ₹12.98 crore.

== Soundtrack ==
Ujda Chaman

Soundtrack album by Gourov - Roshin and Guru Randhawa
- Released: 1 November 2019
- Recorded: 2019
- Studio: GnR Studios
- Genre: Feature film soundtrack
- Length: 15:42
- Language: Hindi
- Label: T-Series
- Producer: Roshin Balu
External audio
- Official Audio Jukebox on YouTube

The music is composed by Gourov - Roshin and lyrics written by Devshi Khanduri. Originally song "Outfit" was sung by Guru Randhawa composed by Preet Hundal and lyrics by Guru Randhawa and Ikka.

Track list
No.	Title	Singer(s)	Length
1.	"Chand Nikla"	Divya Kumar	4:37
2.	"Twinkle Twinkle"	Tochi Raina	3:22
3.	"Outfit" (Music and lyrics by Guru Randhawa)	Guru Randhawa	2:41
4.	"Oh Bandeya"	Yasser Desai	5:02
Total length:			15:42

== See also ==
- Bala (2019 film), based on the same issue
