= Bobby Aur Rishi Ki Love Story =

Hindi romantic comedy film

- Promotional release poster
- Directed by: Kunal Kohli
- Written by: Kunal Kohli; Hardik Gajjar
- Produced by: Mohaan Nadaar; Jyoti Deshpande
- Starring: Vardhan Puri; Kaveri Kapur
- Cinematography: Andrew Hall
- Music by: A. R. Rahman
- Production companies: The Indian Scion Production; The Production Headquarters
- Distributed by: Disney+ Hotstar
- Release date: 11 February 2025
- Running time: 97 minutes
- Country: India
- Language: Hindi

Bobby Aur Rishi Ki Love Story is a 2025 Indian Hindi-language romantic comedy film directed by Kunal Kohli. It stars Vardhan Puri and Kaveri Kapur in lead roles, alongside Nisha Aaliya and Lillete Dubey in supporting roles. The film premiered on Disney+ Hotstar on 11 February 2025.

== Plot summary ==
Bobby, a young woman traveling from Glasgow to Cardiff, has her flight diverted to London due to a volcanic ash cloud. Stranded at Heathrow Airport, she crosses paths with Rishi, an eager stranger who instantly falls for her. Rishi follows Bobby to Cambridge, where they spend a day exploring the city, sharing stories and bonding. Despite initial resistance, Bobby slowly warms up to Rishi, though she remains hesitant due to a recent heartbreak.

Two years later, the two unexpectedly meet again at a couples therapy session. Now married but facing issues, they revisit their past, confront their insecurities, and try to rediscover the spark in their relationship. Whether they reconcile or part ways forms the crux of the story.

== Cast and characters ==
- Vardhan Puri as Rishi
- Kaveri Kapur as Bobby
- Nisha Aaliya as Riya, Bobby's sister
- Lillete Dubey as Dr. Shenaya Kharody, therapist
- Seema Bowri as Bobby's mother
- Sameer Suri as Bobby's father
- Raj Zutshi as Rishi's father
- Sonam Nanwani as Anjali

== Production ==
The film was directed by Kunal Kohli, known for his previous work Hum Tum. It was produced by The Indian Scion Production Ltd (UK) and The Production Headquarters Ltd, and Jio Studios. Filming took place across various locations in the United Kingdom, especially in Cambridge.

The film pays homage to classics such as Hum Tum and Before Sunrise, with a large part of the narrative involving long conversations across scenic locations. Music for the film was composed by A. R. Rahman and others.

== Release ==
Bobby Aur Rishi Ki Love Story was released on 11 February 2025 on Disney+ Hotstar, bypassing theatrical release.

== Reception ==
The film received mixed to negative reviews from critics. Archika Khurana of The Times of India gave the film 2 out of 5 stars, writing, "Ultimately, Bobby Aur Rishi Ki Love Story feels like a rushed homage to Hum Tum but lacks the charm, depth, and memorable moments that made Kohli’s previous work so successful." Rishabh Suri of Hindustan Times criticized the film's writing and performances, stating that "it exemplifies how not to create a compelling love story in Hindi cinema."

Aishwarya Vasudevan of OTTplay rated the film 1.5 out of 5 stars, commenting that "Vardhan Puri and Kaveri Kapur's rom-com has neither romance nor comedy." Devesh Sharma of Filmfare gave it 2.5 stars, noting that it had "a nice meet-cute, beautiful locations and actors who are nothing but sincere," but that the film failed in execution. Bollywood Hungama stated, "On the whole, Bobby Aur Rishi Ki Love Story pays a nice homage to Hum Tum and Before Sunrise but it falters due to the absence of a strong conflict in the narrative."

Sushmita Dey of Times Now gave 2 stars, writing that the film "falls short of expectations with flat performances, forced dialogue, and an underwhelming soundtrack."
