= Khuda Haafiz =

2020 Indian film by Faruk Kabir

- Release poster
- Directed by: Faruk Kabir
- Written by: Faruk Kabir
- Produced by: Kumar Mangat Pathak; Abhishek Pathak
- Starring: Vidyut Jammwal; Shivaleeka Oberoi; Annu Kapoor; Shiv Panditt; Aahana Kumra; Sougata Ghosh
- Cinematography: Jitan Harmeet Singh
- Edited by: Sandeep Francis
- Music by: Songs: Mithoon; Background Score: Amar Mohile
- Production company: Panorama Studios
- Distributed by: Disney+ Hotstar
- Release date: 14 August 2020
- Running time: 134 minutes
- Country: India
- Language: Hindi

Khuda Haafiz (transl. May God be your protector) (Note: The term is also a common parting phrase in the Indian subcontinent.) is a 2020 Indian Hindi-language action thriller film written and directed by Faruk Kabir and produced by Panorama Studios. It stars Vidyut Jammwal and Shivaleeka Oberoi, alongside Annu Kapoor, Aahana Kumra and Shiv Panditt. Set during the 2008 financial crisis, Sameer Chaudhary arrives at a fictional Middle east country Noman in order to rescue his kidnapped wife Nargis from flesh traders.

Khuda Haafiz premiered on Disney+ Hotstar in 14 August 2020, where it received mixed reviews from critics and became a success in Disney+ Hotstar.

== Plot ==
In 2007, Sameer Chowdhary, a software engineer, falls in love with Nargis through an alliance, and the two get married. The 2008 financial crisis leaves Sameer and Nargis jobless. Three months later, they get jobs in Noman, a fictional Middle East country, with the help of Nadeem, an employee at an overseas recruitment company. Nargis leaves for Noman, while Sameer stays to wait for his documents to arrive. After her arrival in Noman, Nargis calls Sameer in a panic state where she tells that someone is kidnapping her. Sameer travels to Noman, where he meets Usman Hamid Ali Murad, a taxi driver. Sameer asks Usman to take him to the address given by Nadeem, but he learns that there is no such address.

Usman takes Sameer to the police station, where he learns that Nadeem has gone missing. Fallen out of help with the police due to his restless nature, Sameer approaches the Indian embassy, where he poses as an employee of a telecom company and acquires the address of the person from whose phone Nargis contacted him, which turns out to be a person named Shirazi. Sameer and Usman learn about Shirazi's involvement in human trafficking. Sameer visits brothels with Usman in search of Nargis and finds her, but he is attacked by the owners, and Sameer turns violent, killing the men, and a car chase ensues, which results in Sameer getting arrested by the Indian Embassy cops.

Sameer narrates the incident to the cops, where he is approached by Faiz Abu Malik, a Nomani cop, who decides to help him, with officer Tamena joining along (assigned by Commander Ali Azam Ghazi). They view the CCTV footage of the Noman airport, where they see Nargis entering a van with a man revealed to be Itzak Regini, an Algerian modelling coordinator. Itzak orders that Nargis be killed. Faiz and Tamena come across a burnt corpse and believe it to be Nargis. Sameer sees her pendant and is shattered. Following her funeral, Sameer is given compensation and tickets to India. Tamena learns Nargis is alive, and the corpse they found was of a different woman. Tamena and Faiz try to find Sameer, only to find that Sameer never boarded the flight.

Baying for revenge, Sameer arrives at Itzak's house and thrashes him before Itzak reveals that Nargis is alive. Faiz and Tamena arrive, and Faiz is revealed to be Itzak's ally. Tamena subdues Faiz long enough to buy Sameer and Usman time to escape, using the black truck trailer where Nargis is inside. Faiz kills Tamena and frames Sameer. An ensuing truck chase leaves Itzak dead. Faiz meets his crime partner and Itzak's boss, named Hakkan Rabbani, who is photographed by an undercover cop. Sameer arrives at the Indian Embassy, but is captured by Faiz, and planned to kill him, saying, "You're Dead!", until the guard stops him by using his gun, including the betrayal by Ghazi that Faiz is part of a child trafficking organization (using photos as evidence photographed by an undercover cop). Enraged, Sameer engaged in a bloodied fistfight with Faiz and thrashes him. For Sameer's heroic survival, one guard opens the back of the truck, freeing Nargis and other women.

Three days later, Sameer attends the state funeral where Tamena is laid, while Faiz gets killed by the firing squad in the middle of the desert for his crimes and kidnapping women. At the airport, as Sameer and Nargis prepare to leave for India, Usman makes its last meeting with the two. Sameer invites Usman to arrive and meet them in India, as they greet him one day before returning to India.

== Cast ==
- Vidyut Jammwal as Sameer Choudhary, Nargis' husband
- Shivaleeka Oberoi as Nargis Choudhary (née Rajput), Sameer's wife
- Annu Kapoor as Usman Hamid Ali Murad, a taxi driver in Noman
- Shiv Panditt as Faiz Abu Malik, Itzak's ally in the ISA
- Aahana Kumra as Tamena Hamid, ISA
- Vipin Sharma as Nadeem, an agent and employee at Ansaar Overseas Recruitment
- Nawab Shah as Itzak Regini
- Siddhant Ghegadmal as Karim
- Rio Kapadia as Commander Ali Azam Ghazi, Faiz's and Tamena's boss
- Ikhlaque Khan as I.K. Mishra, Deputy Council of Affairs at the Indian Embassy in Noman
- Arradhya Maan as an employee
- Suparna Marwah as Nagma Rajput, Nargis' mother
- Mohit Chauhan as Harsh Rajput, Nargis' father
- Mömin Rizo as I.K. Mishra's assistant
- Shahnawaz Pradhan as Suraj Pradhan Chaudhary, Sameer’s father
- Gargi Patel as Nandini Chaudhary, Sameer’s mother
- Nithish as Sahir
- Asrar Khan as police officer (LKO)
- Alif Chowdhury as police officer
- Sougata Ghosh

== Production ==
Following official announcement in April 2019, shooting commenced at Uzbekistan on 14 October 2019.

== Soundtrack ==
Khuda Haafiz

Soundtrack album by Mithoon
- Released: 11 August 2020
- Recorded: 2019
- Genre: Feature film soundtrack
- Length: 20:53
- Language: Hindi
- Label: Zee Music Company

Mithoon chronology
Malang (2020)	Khuda Haafiz (2020)	Shamshera (2020)
External audio
- Official Juekbox on YouTube

The music for the film was composed by Mithoon who also wrote lyrics for four of the tracks, with Sayeed Quadri penning two songs in the soundtrack album.

Track listing
No.	Title	Lyrics	Singer(s)	Length
1.	"Jaan Ban Gaye"	Mithoon	Mithoon, Vishal Mishra, Asees Kaur	3:31
2.	"Khuda Haafiz – Title Track"	Sayeed Quadri	Vishal Dadlani	3:38
3.	"Mera Intezaar Karna"	Mithoon	Armaan Malik	4:25
4.	"Aakhri Kadam Tak"	Mithoon	Sonu Nigam	4:17
5.	"Jaan Ban Gaye" (Reprise)	Mithoon	Asees Kaur	1:40
6.	"Khuda Haafiz" (Unplugged)	Sayeed Quadri	Javed Ali	3:22
Total length:				20:53

== Marketing and release ==
On 29 June 2020, Disney+ Hotstar conducted a virtual press conference where Uday Shankar announced the film's digital release on the platform on 14 August 2020, exclusively as part of the Disney+ Hotstar Multiplex initiative which was a result of cinemas being shut down due to COVID-19 pandemic. However, Vidyut Jammwal was not invited for the social media announcement, along with Kunal Khemu, whose film Lootcase also released on the same digital streaming platform. Disney+ Hotstar released and promoted the film's trailer first, through the streaming application on 24 July 2020, along with the much anticipated premiere of Sushant Singh Rajput's last film Dil Bechara. The trailer was launched through YouTube, the following day.

== Reception ==
On the review aggregator website Rotten Tomatoes, 25% of 8 critics' reviews are positive, with an average rating of 4.5/10.

Bollywood Hungama gave 3/5 stars and wrote "Khuda Haafiz is a well-paced action thriller that works chiefly due to the script, direction and performances of Vidyut Jammwal and Annu Kapoor." Vibha Maru of India Today gave 3/5 stars and wrote "Khuda Haafiz makes for a good one-time watch. From action to drama, the film has it all. You might want to pick this over the weekend." Pallabi Dey Purkayastha of The Times of India gave 2.5/5 stars and wrote "Khuda Haafiz’ — literal meaning ‘May God be your Guardian’ — does not have the most innovative script on the planet but it still could have worked had it not been for the randomness in the second half and the outrageously sham Arabic accents." Devesh Sharma of Filmfare gave 2.5/5 stars and wrote "Khuda Haafiz truly had the potential to be a cracker of an action-filled romance. But patchy writing has diluted its impact. The only thing that works here, as said earlier, is Vidyut’s virtuosity as an action star. Watch the film for some well-crafted set pieces and you won’t get disappointed."

== Sequel ==
A sequel titled Khuda Haafiz Chapter II Agni Pariksha was announced in September 2020 after the success of the first part with Kumar Mangat and Abhishek Pathak as the producers and Faruk Kabir as the director. Vidyut Jammwal and Shivaleeka Oberoi will reprise their roles. The film released in 2022.
