= Bakaiti =

2025 Indian TV series

- Promotional poster
- Genre: Slice Of Life; Family Dramedy
- Created by: Aditi Shrivastava
- Written by: Abhinav Vaidya; Gunjan Saxena; Neha Pawar
- Screenplay by: Abhinav Vaidya; Gunjan Saxena; Neha Pawar
- Directed by: Ameet Guptha; Samar Iqbal
- Starring: Sheeba Chaddha; Rajesh Tailang; Tanya Sharma; Aaditya Shukla
- Music by: Abhijeet Hegdepatil (S1) Shubham Shah (S2)
- Country of origin: India
- Original language: Hindi
- No. of seasons: 2
- No. of episodes: 14

Production
- Producers: Aditi Shrivastava; Vinay Pillai
- Cinematography: Deep Metkar
- Editors: Vinay Mandal; Karan Varia
- Production companies: Pocket Aces; Dice Media

Original release
- Network: ZEE5
- Release: August 1, 2025 – present

Bakaiti is an Indian Hindi-language comedy-drama web series produced by Dice Media for ZEE5. Set in old Ghaziabad, it follows the middle-class Kataria family as they deal with financial pressure and domestic conflict. It stars Sheeba Chaddha and Rajesh Tailang, with Tanya Sharma and Aaditya Shukla in the other lead roles. The first season, directed by Ameet Guptha, was released on 1 August 2025. A second season, directed by Samar Iqbal, premiered on 25 September 2026.

== Premise ==
=== Season 1 ===
The story follows the five-member Kataria family during a period of financial difficulty. To bring in additional income, the family patriarch, Sanjay, decides to rent out a room in their home, which requires his 21-year-old daughter Naina to move in with her younger brother Bharat. Naina resents the change, and Bharat resents sharing his space. At the same time, Sanjay and his wife Sushma come under pressure from Sanjay's younger brother to sell the ancestral home after the recent death of their father. The arrival of a new tenant tests the family's relationships and generational differences.

=== Season 2 ===
Season 2 is set about a year after the first. Struggling lawyer Sanjay faces mounting financial pressure and accepts an unethical eviction case, and a bribe, from a local gangster, Pushpendra Tyagi, while his brother Ajay pushes to redevelop the family's ancestral home. Sushma starts a home boutique to find her own footing, Naina contends with the pressures of academic and city life in Mumbai alongside a growing relationship with her classmate Kevin, and Bunty pursues a place in a cricket league. A family confrontation and a health crisis affecting the household's grandfather bring the Katarias' accumulated tensions to a head before the family reconciles and unites against Tyagi.

== Cast and characters ==
=== Main ===
- Rajesh Tailang as Sanjay Kataria
- Sheeba Chaddha as Sushma Kataria, Sanjay's wife, Naina and Bharat's mother
- Tanya Sharma as Naina "Nonu" Kataria, Sanjay and Sushma's elder daughter, Bharat's sister
- Aaditya Shukla as Bharat "Bunty" Kataria, Sanjay and Sushma's younger son, Naina's brother

=== Recurring ===
- Parvinder Jit Singh as Ajay Kataria, Sanjay's brother
- Poonam Jangra as Alka Kataria, Ajay's wife and Sanjay's sister-in-law
- Shashwat Chaturvedi as Aman Kataria, Ajay and Alka's son
- Ramesh Rai as Nanaji, Sushma's father and Sanjay's father-in-law
- Keshav Sadhna as Chirag, Sanjay's tenant
- Devishi Madaan as Ishita, Sushma's assistant
- Rtwik Nambiar as Kevin Joseph, Naina's friend (S2)
- Abhijeet Chavan as Pushpendra Tyagi, Sanjay's client, owner of Lovely Properties (S2)

== Episodes ==
=== Season 1 (2025) ===
No.	Title	Directed by	Original release date
1	"Paani Ki Tanki Bhar Gayi Hai"	Ameet Guptha	1 August 2025
Sanjay Kataria informs his family about his plan to rent out a room in their ancestral home. His father disapproves and rebukes him, while the Kataria children start coming up with ideas to make some extra income.
2	"Tervi Mein Teekhi Baat"	Ameet Guptha	1 August 2025
Following Dadaji’s passing, the family gathers at Ajay’s home. While everyone navigates various family matters, Naina and Bharat scheme to drive away interested tenants. Sanjay learns of their actions and confronts them with a firm ultimatum.
3	"Naya Mehmaan"	Ameet Guptha	1 August 2025
A visit from a neighbour sparks the Kataria siblings’ idea to launch a home-based business, but their venture quickly falls apart. Soon after, the charismatic Chirag moves in as a tenant, leaving Naina instantly smitten.
4	"Result Kahaan Hai"	Ameet Guptha	1 August 2025
Naina and Bharat sharing a room leads to increased chaos in the Kataria household. Naina shares a sweet moment with Chirag, while Sanjay heads to Ajay’s furniture store to resolve the disagreement over the house.
5	"Rakhi Ya Friendship"	Ameet Guptha	1 August 2025
The Katarias’ Raksha Bandhan celebration takes an unpleasant turn when a quarrel prompts Ajay and his family to leave. Naina tries to get closer to Chirag, while Bharat overhears his parents arguing and is confronted with a painful truth.
6	"Dil Ka Kamra"	Ameet Guptha	1 August 2025
Bharat is thrilled about his upcoming cricket trials, while Naina struggles with uncertainty about her future and the pain of heartbreak. On the night before her birthday, she pours her feelings into a heartfelt letter.
7	"Birthday aur Bakaiti"	Ameet Guptha	1 August 2025
On Naina’s birthday, she is nowhere to be seen. As Ajay and his family arrive to celebrate, an argument breaks out between the elder Kataria siblings. Meanwhile, Bharat figures out where Naina might be.

== Production ==
Bakaiti was created and produced by Dice Media, the digital content division of Pocket Aces Pictures. The series is produced by Aditi Shrivastava and written by Gunjan Saxena, Neha Pawar, and Sheetal Kapoor.

The second season was directed by Samar Iqbal for Dice Media, with a screenplay by Gunjan Saxena, Abhinav Vaidya and Neha Pawar. Iqbal said that where the first season had observed the Katarias, he wanted the second to "breathe with them", adding that the show retains its humour while spending more time on the characters' relationships.

== Release ==
The first season, comprising seven episodes, was released on ZEE5 on 1 August 2025. The second season's trailer was released on 18 September 2026, and the season premiered on ZEE5 on 25 September 2026.

== Reception ==
=== Season 1 ===
Bakaiti received mixed-to-positive reviews from critics.

Archika Khurana of The Times of India rated the series 3 out of 5 stars, describing it as a modest and heartfelt portrayal of Indian family life that may appeal to viewers seeking comfort and familiarity, though it avoids high‑stakes drama and may feel too safe for some audiences." Shweta Keshri of India Today, also giving a score of 3/5, noted that "noted that while the premise feels familiar, the warmth and genuineness of the storytelling make it an easy and pleasant watch, especially as a short weekend binge."

In a less favourable review, Shubhra Gupta of The Indian Express rated it 2/5, calling it "a patchy drama that fails to rise above its noisy family conflicts." Nandini Ramnath of Scroll.in commented that "A cash-strapped family gets on each other’s nerves – and yours too at times." Lachmi Deb Roy of Firstpost rated the series 3/5, noting that "No out-of-the-box storyline, but it will touch your heart for its simplicity." Nirali Kanabar of Times Now rated 3/5 calling it "a relatable slice‑of‑life drama suited for those seeking a light‑hearted watch."

Anindita Mukherjee of News18 gave the show 3/5 and wrote "Bakaiti has its loopholes, though they’re easy to overlook. At times, certain segments feel stretched. Multiple episodes revolving around the same ‘to rent or not to rent’ storyline come across as repetitive." Arpita Sarkar of OTT Play rated it 3.5/5 describing it as "a warm, lively portrayal of everyday family chaos and relationships, capturing both affection and generational differences." Divya Raje Bhonsale of Mathrubhumi awarded it 3.5/5 praising the performances of Rajesh Tailang and Sheeba Chaddha as parents facing financial struggles while navigating their children’s aspirations."
