= Rabia & Olivia =

Rabia and Olivia
- Poster of movie Rabia & Olivia
- Directed by: Shadab Khan
- Screenplay by: Shadab Khan
- Story by: Shadab Khan
- Produced by: Yousef Sheikh
- Starring: Sheeba Chadha; Helena Prizen Klague; Mustafa Sheikh; Shadab Khan
- Cinematography: Lenod Kogan; Pankaj Kachua
- Edited by: Prashant Panda
- Music by: Ripul Sharma
- Production company: Synchron Entertainment
- Distributed by: Disney+ Hotstar
- Release date: 24 February 2023
- Running time: 124 minutes
- Country: India
- Language: Hindi

Rabia and Olivia is a 2023 Indian Hinglish-language drama film written and directed by Shadab Khan. The film starring Sheeba Chaddha, Nayab Khan, Helena Prizen Klague, Mustafa Sheikh, Shadab Khan.

== Plot ==
Rabia and Olivia is a story of how the bond between a child and her care-taker grows into a bond of mother and daughter and how there is drastic change in the behaviour of Olivia under the Rabiya's care. But due to some unthoughtful events, Rabiya was arrested and there start an online campaign in the justice of Rabiya.

Due to the intensity and fire in their efforts, more and more people join them in support of their noble mission. Ultimately, on the grounds of humanity, media, politicians and common people join in the form of a humanity and made Rabiya meet Olivia.

== Cast ==
- Nayab Khan as Rabia
- Helena Prinzen Klague as Olivia
- Sheeba Chaddha as Rabiya's Mother
- Mustafa Sheikh as Moosa
- Afroz Khan as Naser Bhai
- Shadab Khan as Ishaan
- Nathan Bragg as Mark

== Production ==
The drama film is produced under the banner of Synchron Entertainment, produced by Yousef Sheikh, co-produced by Tamara Gazzaz. The film is directed, story, screenplay and dialogue by Shadab Khan. The producer Yousef Sheikh has also given the screenplay and dialogue in the film. Music and lyrics are given by Ripul Sharma and background score by Jeorge Joseph. The film has been shot in Toronto, Mumbai and Aurangabad.

== Reception ==
Ronak Kotecha of The Times of India has given three star and quoted it as universal story. Subuddhi Prajapti of OTT Play has also given three star and written that it is a beautiful story.
