= Alka Amin =

Indian actress

- Born: Alka Saxena; 2 November 1960 (age 66); Delhi, India
- Occupation: Actress
- Years active: 1988–present

Alka Amin is an Indian film, television, and theatre actress. She graduated from the National School of Drama. She is known for her performance in Bollywood movies like Dum Laga Ke Haisha, Shaadi Mein Zaroor Aana, Luka Chuppi, Kedarnath, Romeo Akbar Walter, Badhaai Ho, Amazon exclusive web series Chacha Vidhayak Hain Humare, award-winning short film Maya and Sex Chat With Pappu and Papa. Her notable performances include playing 'Veena Chopra' in Parichay.

== Filmography ==
=== Television ===
Year	Show	Role	Notes
1988-1989	Dil Dariya		
2008	Anaro	Anaro	
2009-2010	12/24 Karol Bagh	Manju Sethi	
2011-2013	Parichay	Veena Raj Chopra	
2012-2013	Kya Huaa Tera Vaada	Kanwal Chopra	
2014-2015	Ajeeb Dastaan Hai Yeh	Sharda Sachdev	
2015-2017	Kalash	Manju Grewaal	
2016-2017	Pardes Mein Hai Mera Dil	Asha Batra	
2018	Yeh Pyaar Nahi Toh Kya Hai	Gayatri Sinha	
2019	Kasautii Zindagii Kay	Sharda	

=== Films ===
Year	Film	Role	Notes
2003	Swaraj	Leelavathi	
2015	Dum Laga Ke Haisha	Shashi Tiwari	
2017	Shaadi Mein Zaroor Aana	Shanti Mishra	
2018	Khajoor Pe Atke	Kadambari	
2018	Badhaai Ho	Jeetu's sister-in-law	
2018	Kedarnath	Mrs. Khan	
2018	Maya	Mother	Short film
2019	72 Hours: Martyr Who Never Died	Leela Rawat	
2019	Luka Chuppi	Shakuntala Shukla	
2019	Romeo Akbar Walter	Waheeda	
2019	Aadhaar	Rani's Mother	
2021	Lahore Confidential	Ananya's Mother	
2023	Kanjoos Makhichoos	Jamuna Prasad Pandey's Mother	
2023	The Great Indian Family	Sushila Kumari	
2023	Ajmer 92	Sumitra, Madhav's mother	
2024	Aayushmati Geeta Matric Pass	Malti	
2024	Navras Katha Collage	Punjabi mother	
2026	The Kerala Story 2	Hafsa Begum	
2026	Aryabhatt Ka Zero	Manju	

=== Web series ===
Year	Series	Role	Notes
2016	Sex Chat with Pappu and Papa	Usha Watsa (Dadi)	YRF
2018–present	Mirzapur	Geeta Tyagi	Amazon Prime Video
2018–present	Chacha Vidhayak Hain Humare	Amrita Pathak	Amazon Prime Video
2022	Nirmal Pathak Ki Ghar Wapsi	Santoshi Pathak	SonyLIV
2025	Bada Naam Karenge	Kusum Rathi	SonyLIV
