= Navras Katha Collage =

- Official poster
- Directed by: Praveen Hingonia
- Written by: Praveen Hingonia
- Produced by: SKH Patel; Praveen Hingonia
- Starring: Praveen Hingonia; Alka Amin; Sheeba Chaddha; Atul Shrivastava; Sunita Rajwar; Paritosh Tripathi; Shaji Chaudhary; Dayanand Shetty; Rajesh Sharma; Nilu Kohli; Revathi Pillai; Amardeep Jha; Swar Hingonia
- Edited by: Ajay Varma
- Music by: Asif Chandwani
- Production company: Swardhrupad Production
- Release date: 25 October 2024
- Country: India
- Language: Hindi

Navras Katha Collage is a 2024 Indian Hindi-language drama film written and directed by Praveen Hingonia. It is produced by Praveen Hingonia, SKH Patel and co produced by Abhishek Mishra. It stars Praveen Hingonia, Alka Amin, Sheeba Chaddha, Atul Shrivastava, Sunita Rajwar, Paritosh Tripathi, Dayanand Shetty, Rajesh Sharma and Shaji Chaudhary. Before its release the film screened and awarded in various film festivals. The film is set to release in theaters on 25 October 2024.

== Cast ==
Praveen Hingonia in various roles; a eunuch, lover, rapist, patriot, struggling actor, amorous husband, caring spouse, and a father seeking his son’s approval.

- Alka Amin as Punjabi mother
- Sheeba Chaddha as office boss
- Atul Shrivastava
- Sunita Rajwar
- Paritosh Tripathi as Koyal’s husband
- Shaji Chaudhary
- Dayanand Shetty as Pakistani army officer
- Rajesh Sharma as a superstar
- Neelu Kohli
- Revathi Pillai as Koyal
- Ruhana Khanna as Ruhana
- Amardeep Jha
- Swar Hingonia

== Plot ==
Navras Katha Collage explores the nine core emotions, known as Navras, that shape the human experience. Through a series of interconnected stories, the film portrays the spectrum of emotions, including joy, sorrow, anger, and wonder. Each narrative reflects the various highs and lows of life, with a single actor portraying multiple characters to bring these emotions to life. The film captures the essence of humanity, offering a profound reflection on the emotional complexities that define human existence.

== Screening and awards ==
- India International Film Festival of Boston (Best Social Film)
- Rajasthan International Film Festival (Best Hindi Feature Film)
- Chambal International Film Festival (Best Feature Film)

== Reception ==
Navras Katha Collage received mixed reviews from critics. Times Now Navbharat praised Praveen Hingonia’s portrayal of nine characters and the film’s presentation of nine stories. The Times of India rated the film 2.5 out of 5, praising aspects of its concept while criticising its execution, predictable narratives and inconsistent performances. Patrika also published a review of the film, discussing its narrative and performances.
