= Bajrang Aur Ali =

2024 Indian Hindi language film

- Directed by: Jaiveer
- Written by: Jaiveer; Amit Mishra
- Produced by: Suresh Sharma
- Starring: Sachin Parikh; Gauri Shankar; Jaiveer
- Cinematography: Ravi Bhatt
- Edited by: Bharat Singh
- Music by: Songs: Yug Bhusal; Score: Sameer Phatepekar
- Production company: UtterUp Films
- Release date: 7 June 2024
- Running time: 121 Minutes
- Country: India
- Language: Hindi

Bajrang Aur Ali is a 2024 Indian Hindi-language Social Drama film written and directed by Jaiveer and produced by Suresh Sharma under UtterUp Films. It stars Sachin Parikh and Gauri Shankar. The film promotes religious harmony between Hindus and Muslims, focusing on how the nation belongs to all Indians, irrespective of caste, creed, or religion.

== Premise ==
The film tells the story of Bajrang and Ali, two friends from different communities. As they navigate life, they face many challenges that threaten to tear their friendship apart. Despite the odds, they go to great lengths to keep their bond alive.

== Cast ==
- Jaiveer Sharma as Bajrang
- Sachin Parikh as Ali
- Gauri Shankar as Shoaib
- Riddhi Gupta as Divya

== Production ==
The principal photography for the film was completed in 2019, but it was halted for release.

== Release ==
The film was theatrically released on 7 June 2024. A two-minute trailer was released on 24 May 2024.
