= Sudhir Tailang =

Indian cartoonist (1960–2016)

- Born: 26 February 1960; Bikaner, Rajasthan, India
- Died: 6 February 2016 (aged 55)
- Occupation: cartoonist
- Spouse: Vibha Tailang
- Children: Aditi Tailang
- Relatives: Rajesh Tailang (Brother)
- Writing career
- Notable awards: Padma Shri (Literature & Education : 2004)

Sudhir Tailang (26 February 1960 – 6 February 2016) was an Indian cartoonist.

== Career ==
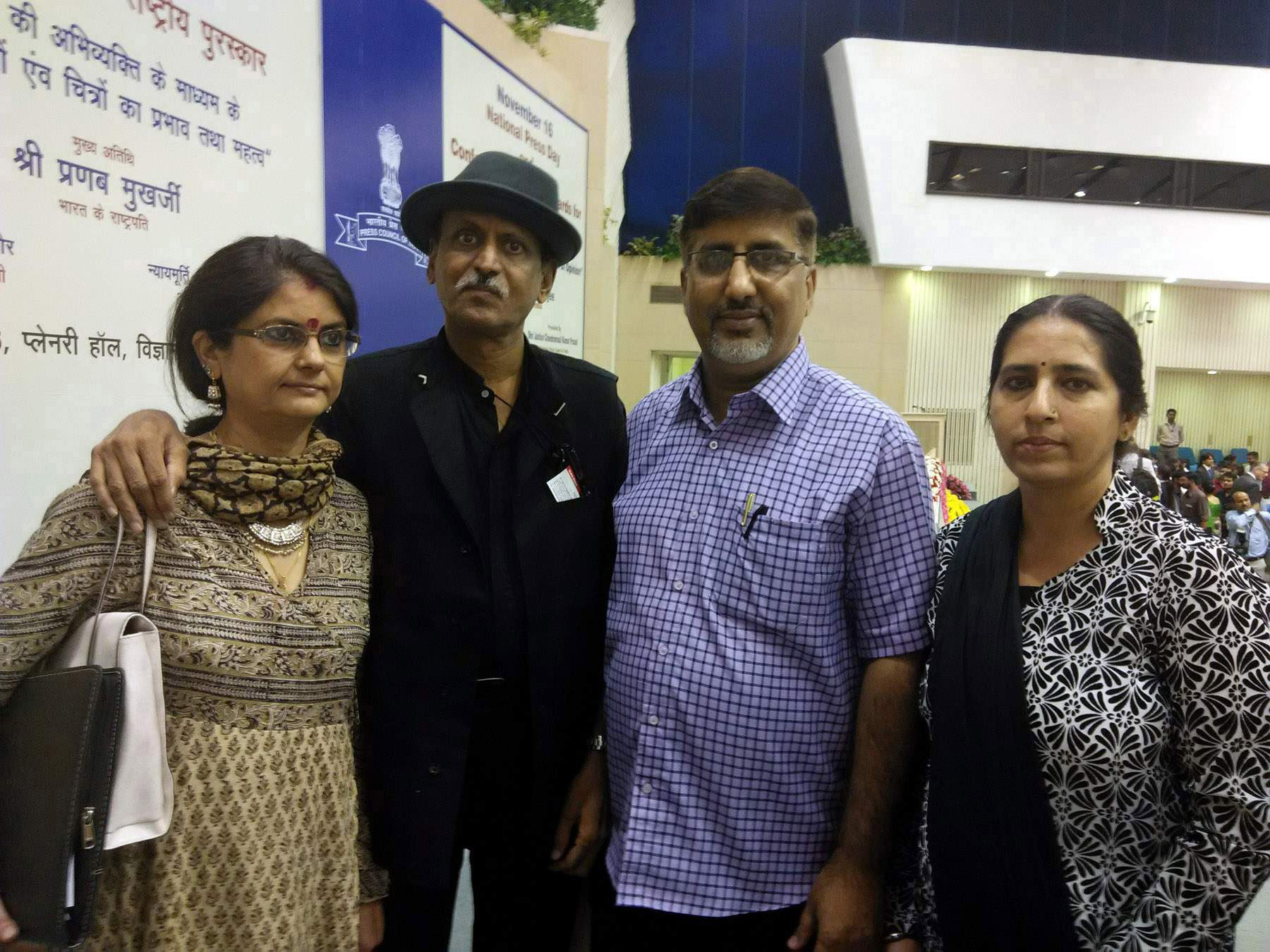
Two leading cartoonists from Indian media Sudhir Tailang and Shekhar Gurera with the women behind them Vibha Tailang and Rekha Gurera respectively at The Vigyan Bhawan, New Delhi, at the occasion of National Press day 2015 on 16 Nov 2015

Tailang was born in Bikaner, Rajasthan, on 26 February 1960. Tailang, who made his first cartoon in 1970, started his career with the Illustrated Weekly of India, Mumbai, in 1982. In 1983, he joined the Navbharat Times in Delhi. For several years he was with the Hindustan Times, while also doing short stints with the Indian Express and The Times of India. His last assignment was with the Asian Age. In 2004 he was awarded Padma Shri in the field of Literature & Education. He launched a book of cartoons titled No, Prime Minister in 2009, a set of cartoons on the former Prime Minister of India Manmohan Singh. He died on 6 February 2016 of brain cancer.
