= Nasha Jurm Aur Gangsters =

2024 Indian film

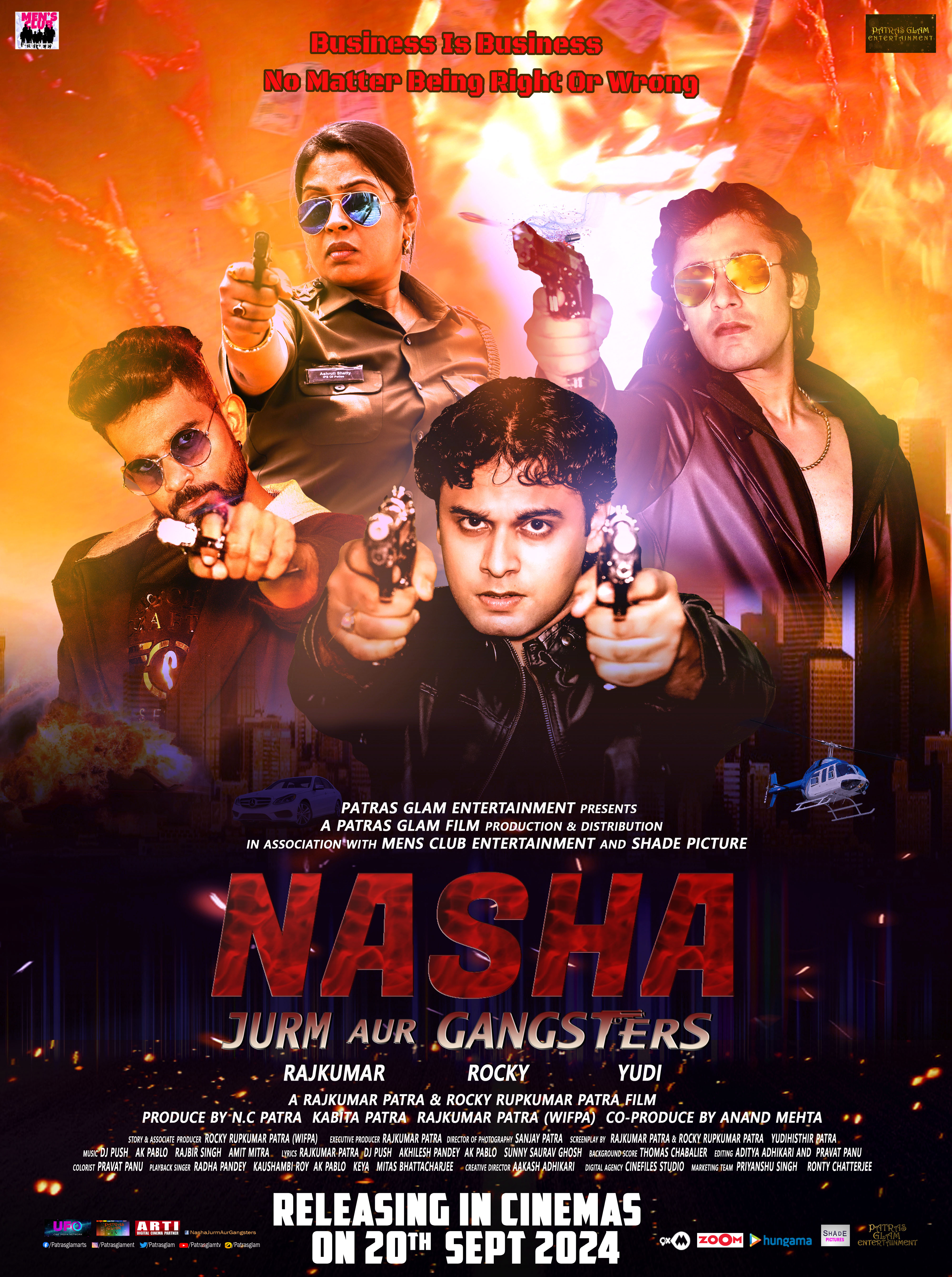
- Nasha Jurm Aur Gangsters Poster
- Directed by: Rajkumar Patra; Rocky Rupkumar Patra
- Written by: Rajkumar Patra; Rocky Rupkumar Patra; Yudhisthir Patra
- Produced by: N. C Patra; Kabita Patra; Rajkumar Patra; Anand Mehta
- Starring: Rajkumar Patra; Rocky Rupkumar Patra; Yudhisthir Patra; Munni Pankaj
- Cinematography: Sanjay Patra
- Music by: Thomas Chabalier; DJ Push; Amit Mitra
- Production companies: Patras Glam Entertainment; Mens Club Entertainment
- Release date: 20 September 2024
- Running time: 137 minutes
- Country: India
- Language: Hindi

Nasha Jurm Aur Gangsters is an Indian Hindi-language action thriller film directed and stars by Rajkumar Patra and Rocky Rupkumar Patra. produced by N C Patra, Kabita Patra, Rajkumar Patra and Anand Mehta.

== Plot ==
Jeet is a gangster of crime world along with his friends Munna and Basu. Officer Vikram investigates the ring of smugglers & soon he catch basu's friend dinu, Sahil Pathan who is involved in drug smuggling business behind the politician face, his nephew Jaggu works under him and supplies drugs.

Jeet and Munna are accused of murdering Officer Vikram Singh, but the murder is committed by Jagga Khan. Which is the reason Jeet becomes irritated and begins to dislike everything, Jeet also has a disliking to Nisha and starts arguing with her. On the other hand, Jackie Singhania who is a smart gangster from Mumbai, is about to deal a contract of ₹20 crore (US$2.1 million)with Jeet. When new IPS officer Shruti Shetty arrives in city and faces all the criminals, Jeet's deadly activities make himself prone to target and everything goes haywire.

== Cast ==
- Rocky Rupkumar Patra as Jeet Roy
- Rajkumar Patra as Jacky Singhaniya
- Munni Pankaj as Ashruti Shetty
- Yudhisthir Patra as Basu Bhai
- Feroz Khan as Munna

== Soundtrack ==
- "Bad Boy" - Kaushambi Roy and DJ Push
- "Don't Touch Me" - Radha Pandey
- "Back To Back" - AK Pablo
- "Tera Kasoor" - Mitash Bhattacharjee
- "Bad Boy" - Keya Das and Kaushambi Roy
- "Tera Kasoor (Instrumental)" - Amit Mitra
- "Gang Chaos" - Thomas Chabalier

== Production ==
Raj kumar patra also join the cast who is director & producer of the film. Rup kumar patra who already on the lead cast, he also join the direction part.

== Release ==
The film was released on 20 September 2024 in cinemas.

== Reception ==
Amit Bhatia from ABP News gave this movie 2 stars out of 5, praising it as a good effort to showcase the world of crime on a low budget, and that its approach to the making and acting is of a good level. He stated that the Bengali audience may like this film but it probably won't be a fit for the pan-India level for this reason. Vaartha noted that limited budget affected production quality and scale. Dainik_Bhaskar Hindi rated the film 2.5/5 described the film as a crime-drama about drugs, ambition and the underworld focusing on three gangsters in Mumbai, made in an inependent style with local crew from Jhargram. Shot in Jhargram, Kalaikunda and Mumbai
