= Monica Chaudhary =

Indian actress (born 1996

- Occupation: Actress
- Years active: 2018–present

Monica Chaudhary is an Indian actress who mainly works in Hindi films and series. She is known for her work in Apharan (2018), which was her acting debut and Tu Jhoothi Main Makkaar (2023), which marked her film debut.

== Early life ==
Chaudhary belongs to Rajasthan, but was bought up in Delhi. Her father is a retired police officer.

== Filmography ==
Key
†	Denotes films that have not yet been released

=== Films ===
Year	Title	Role	Notes	Ref.
2023	Tu Jhoothi Main Makkaar	Kinchi Dabas		
2024	Dashmi	Shrishti		
2024	A Wedding Story	Neha		
TBA	Badtameez Gill †	TBA	Completed	
TBA	Risky Romeo †	TBA	Completed	

=== Television ===
Year	Title	Role	Notes	Ref.
2018	Apharan	Anusha Tyagi	Season 1; released on ALTT	
2020	Dark 7 White	Neelu	Released on ZEE5	
2021	Rudrakaal	Sheena	Released on StarPlus	
2022	Good Bad Girl	Heena	Released on SonyLIV	
2022	Salt City	Ela Bajpai	Released on SonyLIV	
2025	Mandala Murders	Kavita Bhardwaj	Released on Netflix	
