= Bloody Ishq =

- Official release poster
- Directed by: Vikram Bhatt
- Written by: Mahesh Bhatt; Suhrita Das
- Produced by: Rakesh Juneja
- Starring: Avika Gor; Vardhan Puri
- Cinematography: Naren Gedia
- Edited by: Kuldip Mehan
- Music by: Shamir Tandon; Prateek Walia
- Production companies: Hare Krishna Media Tech; Houseful Motion Pictures
- Distributed by: Disney+ Hotstar
- Release date: 26 July 2024
- Country: India
- Language: Hindi

Bloody Ishq (transl. Bloody Love) is a 2024 Indian Hindi-language horror thriller film directed by Vikram Bhatt and written by Mahesh Bhatt. The film stars Avika Gor and Vardhan Puri. The film premiered on 26 July 2024 on Disney+ Hotstar.

== Plot ==
An Indian couple residing on a remote Scottish island encounters unsettling paranormal disturbances in their home. At the film's start, Neha is found drowning and is rescued, but she loses her memory.

Her husband, Romesh, the heir to the island, informs her that they had planned to convert their mansion into a hotel before her accident. As they resume the hotel's renovations, Romesh reassures Neha that her memory will return in time.

Despite his dismissals, Neha continues to experience supernatural events. These occurrences lead her to uncover secrets, including the mysterious death of Romesh's father, played by Rahul Dev. While grappling with amnesia, Neha meets various new characters who reveal clues about her past suspicions that Romesh is involved in the strange happenings and possibly an accomplaise in her father-in-law's death.

The film captures Neha's journey to solve the unexplained phenomena while navigating her mistrust of Romesh and her conflicted feelings of love and constant bodily desire for him.

== Cast ==
- Avika Gor as Neha
- Vardhan Puri as Romesh
- Jeniffer Piccinato as Kimaya Tandon
- Rahul Dev as Romesh's father
- Shyam Kishore as Devdutt Sinha
- Coral Bhamra
- Arshin Mehta as Tanisha Joseph (Paranormal Investigator)
- Gautam Sharma as Abhay Chandok (Paranormal Investigator)

== Production ==
The film was announced in January 2024. It marks the second collaboration between Bhatt and Gor after 1920: Horrors of the Heart (2023). The principal photography of the film started in mid-January 2024. The filming was wrapped up in March 2024. The trailer was released on 16 July 2024.

== Release ==
The film was initially scheduled to release in theatres, but the team planned to go for a streaming release on an OTT platform.

== Reception ==
Deepa Gahlot of Rediff.com rated the film 1/5, writing. "Bloody Ishq comes off looking even more shoddy and ill-conceived when there is so much superior content to entertain the horror buff.". Shubhra Gupta of The Indian Express gave the film half stars out of five, writing. "Just the name should have been enough warning -- the director who gave us Ghulam and the Raaz franchise, has been on a downward spiral for a while now."
