= A Wedding Story =

- Official release poster
- Directed by: Abhinav Pareek
- Written by: Shubho Shekhar Bhattacharjee
- Produced by: Shubho Shekhar Bhattacharjee
- Starring: Vaibhav Tatwawadi; Mukti Mohan; Akshay Anand; Monica Chaudhary; Lakshvir Singh Saran; Piloo Vidyarthi; Krishnakant Singh Bundela
- Cinematography: Supratim Bhol
- Edited by: Ranendu Ranjan
- Music by: Rahi Sayed; Tallz & Sucheta Bhattacharjee
- Production company: Boundless Blackbuck Films
- Release date: 30 August 2024
- Country: India
- Language: Hindi

A Wedding Story is an Indian Hindi-language supernatural horror film directed by Abhnav Pareek. It is written and produced by Shubho Shekhar Bhattacharjee. it stars Vaibhav Tatwawadi, Mukti Mohan, Akshay Anand and Monica Chaudhary. The film is released on 30 August 2024.

== Cast ==
- Vaibhav Tatwawadi as Vikram
- Mukti Mohan as Preeti Bharadwaj
- Akshay Anand as Vikram's father
- Monica Chaudhary as Neha
- Lakshvir Singh Saran as Tarun Nain
- Piloo Vidyarthi
- Krishnakant Singh Bundela

== Release ==
It is released on 30 August 2024.

== Music ==
A wedding Story

Soundtrack album by Rahi Sayed
- Released: August 27, 2024
- Genre: Feature film soundtrack
- Language: Hindi
- Label: Times Music

The film's music was composed by Rahi Sayed, with lyrics written by Tripurari Kumar Sharma, and the background score by Rahi Sayed, Tallz and Sucheta Bhattacharya.

Track listing
No.	Title	Singer(s)	Length
1.	"Arzi"	Rahi Sayed & Nikhita Gandhi	2:39
Total length:			2:39

== Reception ==
Dhaval Roy of The Times of India gave 3 stars out of 5, and stated in his review that "A Wedding Story is a decent watch with a strong concept, promising premise, and atmospheric visuals. But, a more focused narrative and seamless screenplay would have elevated it to a more haunting experience." Sana Farzeen of India Today also gave 3 stars and said that "The film’s intriguing premise, combined with a spooky background score and impactful performances, keep you glued to your seats." Tanmayi Savadi of Times Now criticizes the film saying "If a book had to be written on how to not make a horror film in 2024, A Wedding Story could open the first chapter. This film is a PG-level spook fest and doesn’t live up to the expectations." Pankaj Shukla from Amar Ujala rated the movie out of 5, calling it a potential trendsetter in Hindi horror cinema. Inspired by a shloka from the Garud Purana, the film blends mythology with modern horror. While the trailer reveals the initial premise, the full story unfolds uniquely, rooted in the concept of Panchak kaal and unresolved souls. Shukla praises the film's fresh approach and considers it a step forward for the genre.
