= Shivaleeka Oberoi =

Indian film actress (born 1996)

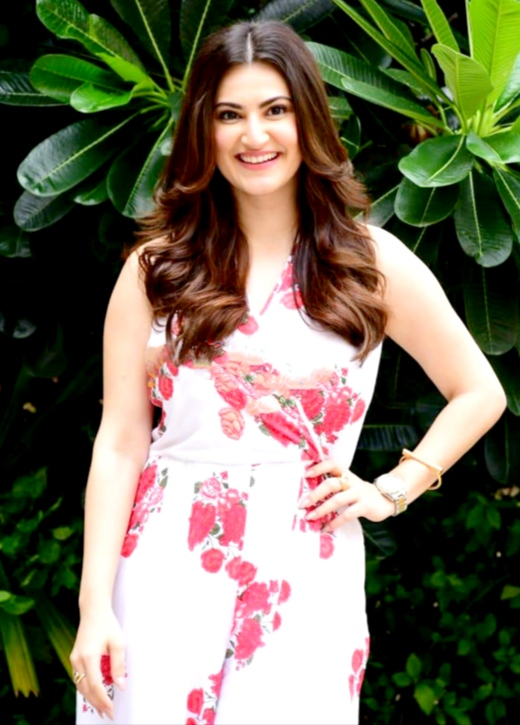
- Oberoi in 2022
- Born: 24 July 1995 (age 30); Mumbai, Maharashtra, India
- Occupations: Actress; model
- Years active: 2014–present
- Spouse: Abhishek Pathak (m. 2023)

Shivaleeka Oberoi (born 24 July 1995) is an Indian actress who appears in Hindi films. Her early acting work includes Yeh Saali Aashiqui (2019) and Khuda Haafiz (2020).

== Early life and education ==
Oberoi's mother, Sarina Oberoi, was a teacher. Her grandfather Mahavir Oberoi, who died when her father was very young, had produced a Bollywood film Sheba and Hercules in 1967.

Oberoi was educated at Arya Vidya Mandir School and Jamnabai Narsee School in Mumbai. She graduated from Mumbai University where she studied Majors in English and Psychology. While she was graduating she did a 3-month diploma course from Anupam Kher's Actor Prepares acting institute.

== Career ==
Soon after graduation, she started working at Nadiadwala Grandson Entertainment and became an assistant director on Kick (2014) and Housefull 3 (2016). After that, she started auditioning for films and took up ads and modelling assignments before she got her debut film.

Before venturing into acting, Oberoi worked as an assistant director at the Nadiadwala Grandson Entertainment productions for Kick (2014) and Housefull 3 (2016). She made her acting debut in 2019 with the romantic thriller film Yeh Saali Aashiqui, co-starring Vardhan Puri, grandson of Amrish Puri. The film was directed by Cherag Ruparel and produced by Pen India Limited and Amrish Puri Films. Her second film Khuda Hafiz with Vidyut Jammwal, directed by Faruk Kabir released on 14 August 2020.

== Personal life ==
It was reported that Oberoi got engaged to her long-term boyfriend actor Karam Rajpal on 15 January 2018. In November 2019, she denied the reports of engagement and called these reports false.

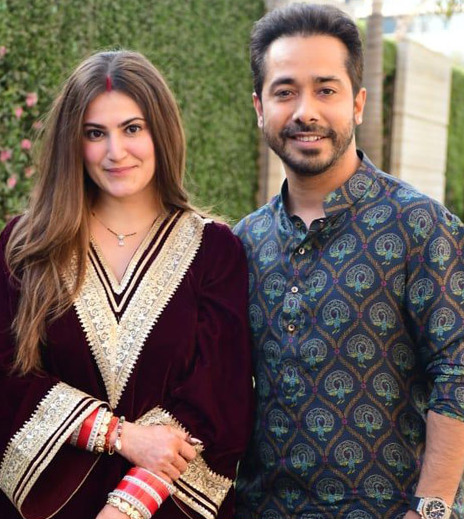
Oberoi with husband Abhishek Pathak in 2023

On 24 July 2022, Oberoi got engaged to filmmaker Abhishek Pathak. In February 2023, they married in Goa.

== Filmography ==
=== Films ===
Year	Title	Role	Notes	Ref.
2014	Kick	—N/a	Assistant director	
2016	Housefull 3	—N/a	Assistant director	
2019	Yeh Saali Aashiqui	Mitali "Mitee" Deora	Nominated - Filmfare Award for Best Female Debut	
2020	Khuda Haafiz	Nargis Rajput Choudary		
2022	Khuda Haafiz: Chapter 2	Nargis Rajput Choudary		

=== Music video appearances ===
Year	Title	Singer(s)	Ref.
2021	"Saiyyonee"	Yasser Desai, Rashmeet Kaur	
2021	"Soulmate"	Akull, Aastha Gill	
2022	"Choti Choti Galtiyan"	Papon	
2022	"Rehna Tere Paas"	Armaan Malik	

== Awards and nominations ==
Year	Award	Category	Work	Result	Ref.
2020	Filmfare Awards	Best Female Debut	Yeh Saali Aashiqui	Nominated	
