= Sheeba Chaddha =

Indian actress (born 1972)

- Chaddha in 2023
- Born: 24 April 1972 (age 54); Saharanpur, Uttar Pradesh, India
- Education: Hansraj College
- Occupation: Actress
- Years active: 1996–present
- Children: 1 (Noor Chaddha)

Sheeba Chaddha (born 24 April 1972) is an Indian film, stage and television actress. She received nominations for the Filmfare Award for Best Supporting Actress for her performances in the 2022 films Badhaai Do and Doctor G, winning for the former.

== Early life and education ==
Chaddha was born in Saharanpur, Uttar Pradesh, and was brought up in Delhi's New Rajinder Nagar neighbourhood in a business family. In an interview, she shared that became involved in acting through inter-school theatre competitions. After completing Class 12, she was inspired to pursue theatre after watching Sheila Bhatia's musical Main Ladli Maina Teri at Delhi's Shriram Theatre. Soon, she developed interest in theatre and started taking theatre workshops.

She majored in English literature from Hans Raj College (University of Delhi). She was a classmate with Anurag Kashyap. Gradually, she participated in full-length college productions and later became associated with the Delhi-based theatre group, Chingari.

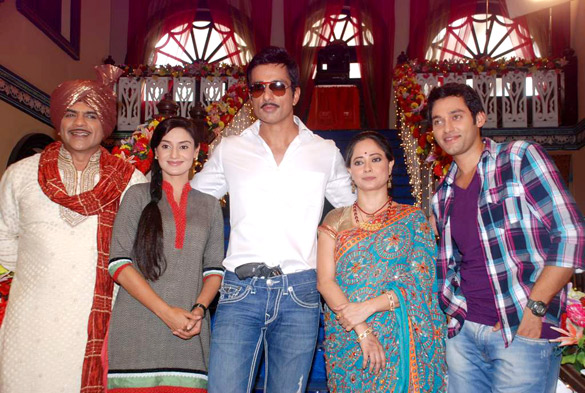
(from right) Rituraj Singh, Rati Pandey, Sonu Sood, Sheeba Chaddha and Sumit Vats, on the sets of Hitler Didi during the promotion of film Maximum (2012)

== Career ==
Chaddha has acted as a character actor in films like Hum Dil De Chuke Sanam (1999), Parzania (2007), Delhi 6 (2009), Luck by Chance (2009) and Talaash (2012). In 2011, she also appeared in short film, Prakata Het Yad in gibberish, with actor Rituraj Singh. The film won he Audience Choice award in the Short Films category at River to River. Florence Indian Film Festival. She appeared in the 2012 film Talaash: The Answer Lies Within as Nirmala, a sex worker. The year 2015 saw her triumph with a quirky turn as Nain Tara Tiwary (Buaji) in Sharat Katariya's Dum Laga Ke Haisha.

Her early appearance on television, was on Love Marriage (2002), thereafter, she made a comeback in television in 2007 playing a business tycoon in Kasturi. This was followed by series like Na Aana Is Des Laado (2009–2012), Kitani Mohabbat Hai (2009), Kahani Saat Pheron Ki (2007), Kuch Toh Log Kahenge (2001–2013) and Lakhon Mein Ek (2012).

In June 2012, she joined the cast of popular television series, Hitler Didi on Zee TV.

She has also acted in stage plays, Rajat Kapoor's C for Clown (2007), Atul Kumar's The Blue Mug (2010) with Kapoor, Munish Bhardwaj, and Vinay Pathak, Konkona Sen Sharma and Ranvir Shorey, played Desdimona in Roysten Abel's Othello in Black& White and a 2012 production of Henrik Ibsen's play Hedda Gabler, where she played the lead role of Hedda. She is also involved in running a theatre group, "The Company Theatre" in Mumbai. She is currently involved with an internet television series, Permanent Roommates, which is under the banner of The Viral Fever (TVF).

== Personal life ==
She was formerly married to theatre artist Atul Kumar, with whom she later separated. Later she claimed to have been in some long term relationship.

== Filmography ==
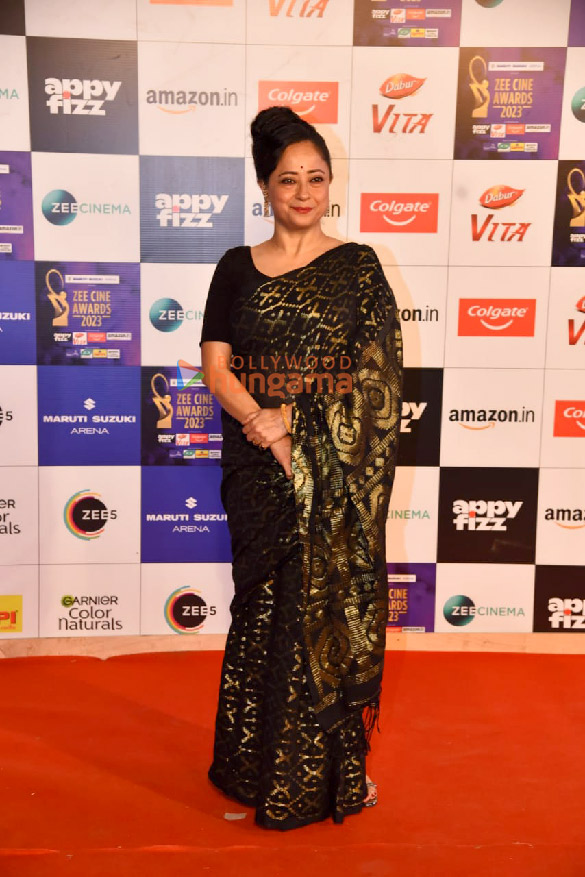
Sheeba Chaddha at Zee Cinema Awards, 2023.

Key
†	Denotes films/shows/series that have not yet been released

=== Films ===
Year	Film	Role	Ref
1998	Dil Se..	Moina's sister	
1999	Hum Dil De Chuke Sanam	Anupama Tripathi	
2000	Phir Bhi Dil Hai Hindustani	Juhi Anand	
2002	Kali Salwar	Rukhsana	
2003	Jism	Sheeba	
2003	In Othello	Kareena	
2004	Ek Hasina Thi	Shilpa Sharma	
2004	Murder	Nargis	
2007	Parzania	Anamika	
2009	Delhi-6	Rajjo	
2009	Luck by Chance	Kavita	
2010	West Is West	Rehana Khan	
2011	Zokkomon	Rajrani	
2012	Love You to Death	Maya Kumari	
2012	Talaash	Nirmala	
2015	Dum Laga Ke Haisha	Nayantara	
2017	Raees	Amina Alam	
2017	Indu Sarkar	Mekhla	
2017	What Will People Say	Archana Bhosle	
2018	Rajma Chawal	Neetu	
2018	Raid	Prabha Devi	
2018	Badhaai Ho	Sangeeta Sharma	
2018	Zero	Beena Singh	
2019	Gully Boy	Zoya Firdausi	
2019	Jabariya Jodi	Beena Singh	
2019	Bebaak	Sheela	
2020	Shakuntala Devi	Tarabai	
2021	Haathi Mere Saathi	Judge Imarti	
2021	Pagglait	Usha	
2022	Badhaai Do	Meenakshi	
2022	Maja Ma	Pammi Hansraj	
2022	Sharmaji Namkeen	Aarti Sharma	
2022	Phone Bhoot	Chikni Chudail	
2022	Khuda Haafiz 2	Sheela Thakur	
2022	Doctor G	Shobha Gupta	
2023	Rabia & Olivia	Rabia's mother	
2023	Trial Period	Mamiji	
2023	The Tenant	Mrs. Mishra	
2024	All India Rank	Kalpana Bundela	
2024	Bad Newz	Vishni Chadha	
2024	Visfot	Roshan	
2024	Navras Katha Collage	Office boss	
2024	Baby John	Madhavi Verma, Satya's mother	
2025	Kaushaljis vs Kaushal	Sangita Kaushal	
2025	Songs of Paradise	Hameeda	
2025	Haq	Bela Jain	
2025	The Great Shamsuddin Family	Saafiya	
2025	Hamlet	Gertrude	
2026	Mirzapur	Vasudha Pandit	
2026	Badtameez Gill †	Filming	
2026	Ramayana: Part 1	Manthara	

=== Television ===
Year	Title	Role	Ref
1999	Star Bestsellers	Episodic	
1998–2001	Hip Hip Hurray	Karuna Madam	
1999–2000	Gubbare	Anu	
2002	Love Marriage	Sonali	
2003	Jassi Jaissi Koi Nahin	Cameo as a reporter	
2007	Kasturi	Devika (Robbie's mother)	
2009	Na Aana Is Des Laado	Bajri Pratapsingh	
2009	Kitani Mohabbat Hai		
2009	Kahani Saat Pheron Ki		
2011–2013	Kuch Toh Log Kahenge	Sanjeevani Garg	
2012	Hitler Didi	Dulari Bua	
2012	Lakhon Mein Ek		
2013–2014	Pavitra Rishta	Rushali Karmarkar	
2015	Hello Pratibha	Pushpa Chachi	
2017	Chandra Nandni	Apama	

=== Web series ===
Year	Title	Role	Ref
2014–present	Permanent Roommates	Lata Chaudhary	
2017	Tanhaiyan	Raza's mother (khala)	
2018	FilterCopy		
2018–2022	Adulting	Nikhat's mother	
2018–present	Mirzapur	Vasudha Pandit	
2018	What's Your Status	Bharat's mother	
2019	Hey Prabhu!	Tarun's Mom	
2020	Bandish Bandits	Mohini	
2020	Taj Mahal 1989	Mumtaz	
2021	Aisa Waisa Pyaar	Sunita	
	Special Day	Malti Mehra	
2022	Good Bad Girl	Nimmi Ahuja	
2023–present	The Trial	Malini Khanna	
2024	The Signal	Indian billionaire Benisha Mudhi	
2025	Bakaiti	Sushma Kataria	
2025	Rangeen	Sitara	
2025	Bindiya Ke Bahubali	Dharavi	
2026	Bait	Tahira Latif	
2026	Bindiya Ke Bahubali Season 2	Dharavi	
2026	Bakaiti Season 2	Sushma Kataria	

== Awards ==
Year	Award	Work	Category	Result	Ref.
2023	Filmfare Awards	Badhaai Ho	Best Supporting Actress	Won	
2023	Filmfare Awards	Doctor G	Best Supporting Actress	Nominated	
