= Andaman (2021 film) =

- Directed by: Smita Singh
- Written by: Anand Raaj
- Screenplay by: Anand Raaj
- Based on: Covid crisis
- Produced by: 8 Pillar Motion Pictures
- Starring: Sanjay Mishra; Rajesh Tailang; Anand Raaj; Anamika Kadamb; Jay shanker Pandey; Rakesh Pandey; Ambrish Bobby; Vishal Agiran
- Cinematography: lndrajeet Singh
- Edited by: Akshay Kumar
- Music by: Firoz Khan; Rishabh Panchal
- Production company: 8 Pillars Motion Pictures
- Release date: 20 November 2021
- Running time: 120 minutes
- Country: India
- Language: Hindi

Andaman is a 2020 Indian Hindi-language drama film directed by Smita Singh. The film is based on COVID crisis. It's starring Sanjay Mishra, Rajesh Tailang, Anand Raaj, Anamica Kadamb, Jay shanker Pandey, Rakesh Pandey, Ambrish Bobby and Saurabh Dwivedi. The film is produced by 8 Pillar Motion Pictures. It was released on 20 November 2021 on OTT platforms.

== Cast ==
- Sanjay Mishra as a boatman (cameo appearance)
- Rajesh Tailang as UPSC Interview panel chairman (cameo appearance)
- Anand Raaj as Abhimanyu Pratap, Panchayat Secretary of Bhullanpur
- Anamica Kadamb
- Jay shanker Pandey
- Rakesh Pandey
- Ambrish Bobby
- Saurabh Dwivedi
- Amrita Pal
- Shreya Awasthi
- Anshul Shukla
- Arav Aryawanshi as Rahul, Ranvijay Singh's brother
- Vishal Agiran
- Piyush Verma
- Sandeep Kumar
- Vinay Kumar Mishra
- Dinesh Awasthi
- Amitabh Mishra

== Plot ==
Andaman is an inspirational social drama about a quarantine centre in an unprivileged village. It unfolds the difficulties encountered by the villagers in the quarantine centre and is rooted in the daily life challenges of common people in rural areas.

== Production ==
The pre-production of the film was started in September 2020 and the production completed in November 2020. The film is extensively shot in Uttar Pradesh.
