= Dashmi =

2024 film directed by Shantanu Anant Tambe

- Theatrical Release Poster
- Directed by: Shantanu Anant Tambe
- Written by: Shantanu Anant Tambe
- Produced by: Sarika Vinod Tambe; Bharani Rang; Sanjana Vinod Tambe
- Starring: Vardhan Puri; Rajesh Jais; Monica Chaudhary
- Cinematography: M. Ravichandran Thevar
- Edited by: Mukesh Thakur
- Music by: Shabbir Ahmed; Prasad Sashte
- Production company: 3S Movies
- Release date: 16 February 2024 (India)
- Running time: 136 Minutes
- Country: India
- Language: Hindi

Dashmi is 2024 Indian Hindi-language drama thriller film written and directed by Shantanu Anant Tambe and produced by Sarika Vinod Tambe, Bharani Rang, Sanjana Vinod Tambe. The film features Vardhan Puri, Rajesh Jais, Monica Chaudhary, and Daljeet Kaur as lead characters.

== Cast ==
- Aadil Khan as ACP Krishna Kant
- Vardhan Puri as Sohail
- Gaurav Sareen as Sachin
- Monica Chaudhary as Shrishti
- Rajesh Jais as Commissioner
- Daljeet Kaur as Patel
- Sanjay Pandey as M.P. Tripathi
- Manoj Tiger as Pandey
- Aisshwarya Anishka as Monu
- Shabaaz Abdullah Badi as Shivam
- Tirth Bhanushali as Tejas
- Ram Naresh Diwakar as Kanaujia
- Khushi Hajare as Dashmi
- Midhat Khan as Chief Minister
- Vinod Nair
- Kailash Pal as Maulana Rizvi
- Vidhaan Sharma as Devensh
- Rekha Singh
- Tanuj Vyas as Baba Cheteshwar

== Release ==
Dashmi was theatrically released on 16 February 2024.

== Reception ==
Archika Khurana from The Times of India rated the film three out of five stars and said "Overall, Dashmi transcends the confines of conventional cinema, emerging as a poignant statement on the imperative need for moral introspection and societal change. It prompts viewers to reflect on the pressing issues it addresses and inspires a call to action in the face of injustice".

A critic from Times Now rated the film three out of five stars and said "In conclusion, Dashmi is more than a movie; it's a statement on the need for moral awakening in contemporary society. It encourages viewers to reflect on the prevalent issues it addresses and ignites a call to action". A critic from Outlook India rated the film four out of five stars and said "A thought-provoking film, 'Dashmi' should not be ignored. It propagates the idea of a justice- and morality-driven society that needs to be experienced on the big screen. Don't miss this one!"
