= Sonnalli Seygall =

Indian actress (born 1989)

Sonnalli Sajnani
- Seygall in 2026
- Born: Sonnalli Seygall; 1 May 1989 (age 37); Calcutta, West Bengal, India
- Occupation: Actress
- Years active: 2011–present
- Spouse: Ashesh L Sajnani (m. 2023)

Sonnalli Sajnani (née Seygall; born 1 May 1989) is an Indian actress and beauty pageant titleholder who represented India at Miss International 2006 and placed Top 12. Her first film was 2011's Pyaar Ka Punchnama, directed by Luv Ranjan. She played Rhea opposite Raayo S. Bakhirta playing Vikrant Chaudhary. Sonnalli was also seen in Pyaar Ka Punchnama 2 and Wedding Pullav, both releasing on the same day (16 October). She was recently seen in an advertisement with Salman Khan for Thums Up.

She was a ramp model before she decided to try her luck at the Miss India Worldwide competition. She has featured in music videos for Prem, a Canadian singer (Times) and Dr. Zeus (Studio One). Having done anchoring at live events for Reebok, Castrol, Indiatimes, Filmfare, Times of India and Dadagiri (reality show), she has also performed at the Indian Embassy in Russia.

Sonnalli also played lead role in Jai Mummy Di, a romantic comedy starring Sunny Singh, Supriya Pathak and Poonam Dillon, directed by Navjot Gulati. The film was released on 17 January 2020.

== Personal life ==
In June 2023, she married restaurateur Ashesh L Sajnani.

== Filmography ==
=== Films ===
Year	Title	Role	Notes	Ref.
2011	Pyaar Ka Punchnama	Rhea		
2015	Wedding Pullav	Rhea		
2015	Pyaar Ka Punchnama 2	Supriya		
2018	Sonu Ke Titu Ki Sweety	Sonu's girlfriend	Cameo	
2018	High Jack	Dilshaad		
2019	Setters	Isha		
2020	Jai Mummy Di	Saanjh Bhalla		
2023	Aseq	Lail		
2024	JNU: Jahangir National University	Jahanvi Ojha		
2024	Jo Tera Hai Woh Mera Hai	Preeti		
2026	Aryabhatt Ka Zero	Rinku		
TBA	Noorani Chehra †	Anam	Completed	
TBA	Black Currency: The Fake Currency Truth Unfolds †	TBA	Completed	

=== Web series ===
Year	Title	Role	Ref.
2017	Salute Siachen	Herself	
2021	Illegal - Justice, Out of Order	Simone Kalra	
2022	Anamika	DCA Agent Rhea	

=== Music video appearances ===
Year	Title	Singer(s)	Ref.
2020	"Jab Hum Padheya Karte The"	Parmish Verma	
2021	"Dholna"	Sona Mohapatra	
2021	"Churi"	Khan Bhaini, Shipra Goyal	
2021	"Ishq Da Rog"	Stebin Ben	

Awards and achievements
Preceded by Vaishali Desai	Miss International India; 2006	Succeeded by Esha Gupta
