= Rajesh Tailang =

Indian actor (born 1973)

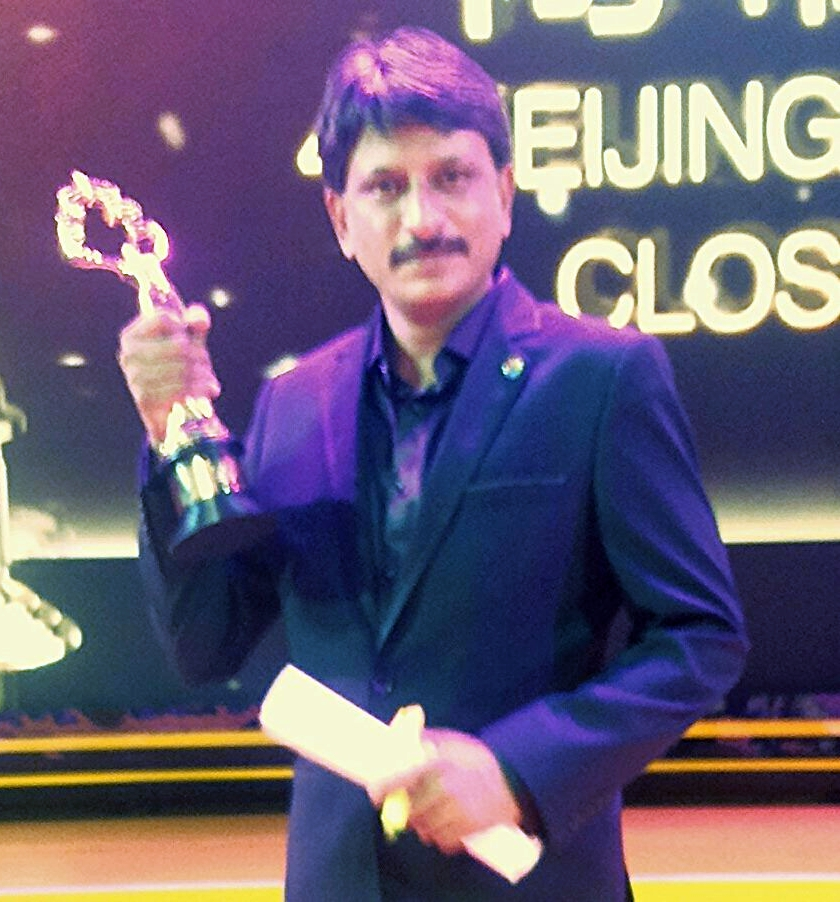
- Rajesh Tailang with Best Film Award for Siddharth at Beijing Film Festival 2014
- Born: 10 October 1973 (age 52); Bikaner, Rajasthan, India
- Occupation: Actor
- Notable work: Siddharth
- Spouse: Shalini Yadav (m. 2000; div. 2016)
- Relatives: Sudhir Tailang (Brother)

Rajesh Tailang (born 10 October 1973) is an Indian actor known for his work in films and web series. He received a nomination for Best Actor at the 2nd Canadian Screen Awards for his performance in the film Siddharth.

In addition to acting, Tailang is also a poet. He is the brother of the late cartoonist Sudhir Tailang.

== Early and personal life ==
Tailang was born in Bikaner, Rajasthan, to Shrikrishna Tailang. His brother, the late Sudhir Tailang, was a noted political cartoonist and a recipient of the Padma Shri. Tailang is an alumnus of the National School of Drama. Tailang married Shalini Yadav in 2000. The couple later divorced in 2016. They have one son.

== Career ==
=== Early work (1994–2007) ===
Tailang began his acting career in 1994 with DD National's first daily soap, Shanti – Ek Ghar Ki Kahani. His first film appearance was in Govind Nihalani's Hazaar Chaurasi Ki Maa. He went on to appear in films such as Jayate, Thakshak, Dev, Mangal Pandey, and Amal, along with several television serials and telefilms.

=== Mainstream success (2013–present) ===
In 2013, Tailang gained mainstream recognition with the film Siddharth, directed by Richie Mehta, for which he received a nomination for Best Actor at the Canadian Screen Awards. The film received positive reviews from international critics, who particularly praised Tailang's performance.

In 2015, he appeared in several notable projects, including Umrika, The Second Best Exotic Marigold Hotel, and Phantom.

He further expanded his filmography with roles in Omerta, Mukkabaaz, Haseena Parkar, and Aiyaari. His portrayal of Ramakant Pandit in the web series Mirzapur, Mohan Kumar in Selection Day, Bhupendra Singh in Delhi Crime, and Rajendra Rathore in Bandish Bandits brought him wide recognition in the OTT space.

He later appeared in films such as Commando 3, Panga, Comedy Couple, Pagglait, Khuda Haafiz: Chapter 2 – Agni Pariksha, Chhatriwali, and Ulajh.

Tailang has also featured in several web series, including Rangbaaz, Dahan, Crackdown, and Trial by Fire.

=== Book ===
Tailang authored the poetry collection Chaand Pe Chai, published by Vani Prakashan in 2022.

== Filmography ==
Key
†	Denotes films that have not yet been released

=== Films ===
Year	Title	Role	Notes
1997	…Jayate	Advocate Nayyer	
1998	Hazaar Chaurasi Ki Maa	Somu's Father	
1999	Thakshak	Randheer	
2004	Dev	ACP Waman Bhonsle	
2005	Mangal Pandey: The Rising	Brahmin Sepoy of India	
2007	Amal	Dhaba Owner	
2013	Siddharth	Mahendra Saini	
2015	Umrika	Postman	
2015	The Second Best Exotic Marigold Hotel	Babul	
2015	Phantom	Raw Agent Alok	
2017	Haseena Parkar	Advocate Shyam Keswani	
2018	Omerta	General Mahmood	
2018	Mukkabaaz	Shravan's Father	
2018	Aiyaary	Brigadier K Srinivas	
2019	Commando 3	Roy	
2020	Panga	National Coach Sinha	
2020	Comedy Couple	Mukesh	
2021	Pagglait	Tarun	Netflix Release
2021	Andaman	UPSC Interview panel chairman	Open Theater
2022	Khuda Haafiz: Chapter 2 – Agni Pariksha	TV News Reporter Ravi Kumar	
2023	Chhatriwali	Rajan Kalra	
2024	Kooki	Dhanajay Mishra	
2024	Ulajh	Salim Sayeed	
2026	Mirzapur	Ramakant Pandit	

=== Short films ===
Year	Films	Role	Director
2015	Mast Qalandar	Master	Divij Roopchand
2016	Zoya (Short)	Zoologist	Sahirr Sethhi
2024	Ek Kadam	Mahendra Solanki	Rajeev Upadhyay

=== Web series ===
Year	Title	Role	Platform
1995	Shanti	Manu	Doordarshan
2018–present	Mirzapur	Ramakant Pandit	Amazon Prime Video
2018	Selection Day	Mohan Kumar	Netflix
2019–present	Delhi Crime	Bhupender Singh	Netflix
2020	Crackdown	Ashvini Rao	Voot
2020	Bandish Bandits	Rajendra	Amazon Prime Video
2021	Dhindora	Parshad	YouTube
2022	Dahan: Raakan Ka Rahasya	Parimal Singh	Disney+ Hotstar
2022	Rangbaaz	Mukul Kumar	Zee5
2023	Trial By Fire	Veer Singh	Netflix
2024	Gaanth Chapter 1 - Jamnaa Paar	Trilok Mishra	JioCinema
2025	Bada Naam Karenge	Rajesh Jaiswal	SonyLiv
2025	Crime Beat	DCP Uday Kumar	ZEE5
2025	Bakaiti	Sanjay Kataria	ZEE5
2026	Bakaiti Season 2	Sanjay Kataria	ZEE5

== Awards and nominations ==
Year	Award	Film/web	Category	Result	Ref.
2014	Canadian Screen Awards	Siddharth	Actor in a Leading Role	Nominated	
2022	Filmfare OTT Awards	Rangbaaz	Best Supporting Actor (Drama)	Nominated	
