= List of Hindi films of 2019 =

This is a list of Bollywood films that were released in 2019.

== Box office collection ==
The highest-grossing Bollywood films released in 2019, by worldwide box office gross revenue, are as follows.

#	Implies that the film is multilingual and the gross collection figure includes the worldwide collection of the other simultaneously filmed version.

Highest worldwide gross of 2019
Rank	Title	Production company	Distributor	Worldwide gross	Ref.
1	War	Yash Raj Films		₹475.62 crore (US$67.54 million)	
2	Saaho	T-Series Films; UV Creations	AA Films	₹407.65—439 crore #	
3	Kabir Singh	T-Series Films; Cine1 Studios	AA Films	₹379.02 crore (US$53.82 million)	
4	Uri: The Surgical Strike	RSVP Movies	RSVP Movies	₹342.06 crore (US$48.57 million)	
5	Bharat	T-Series Films; Salman Khan Films; Reel Life Production	AA Films	₹325.58 crore (US$46.23 million)	
6	Good Newwz	Zee Studios; Dharma Productions; Cape of Good Films	Zee Studios	₹318.57 crore (US$34 million)	
7	Housefull 4	Nadiadwala Grandson Entertainment	Fox Star Studios	₹280.27 crore (US$39.8 million)	
8	Mission Mangal	Cape of Good Films; Hope Productions	Fox Star Studios	₹290.59 crore (US$31 million)	
9	Gully Boy	Excel Entertainment; Tiger Baby Films	AA Films	₹238.16 crore (US$33.82 million)	
10	Dabangg 3	Salman Khan Films; Arbaaz Khan Productions; Saffron Broadcast & Media	Salman Khan Films	₹230.93 crore (US$32.79 million)	

== January–March ==
Opening		Title	Director	Cast	Studio (production house)	Ref.
J A N	4	Salt Bridge	Abhijit Deonath	Rajeev Khandelwal; Chelsie Preston Crayford; Usha Jadhav	Fillearth	
J A N	9	Cabaret	Kaustav Narayan Niyogi	Richa Chadda; Gulshan Devaiah; S. Sreesanth	T-Series Films, Fisheye Network	
J A N	11	706 (film)	Shravan Tiwari	Atul Kulkarni, Divya Dutta,Raayo S. Bakhirta	Sandip Patel, Panorama Studios	
J A N	11	Uri: The Surgical Strike	Aditya Dhar	Vicky Kaushal; Mohit Raina; Paresh Rawal; Yami Gautam	RSVP Movies, B62 Studios	
J A N	11	Battalion 609	Brijesh Batuknath Tripathi	Shoaib Ibrahim; Elena Kazan; Farnaz Shetty; Vishwas Kini; Vicky Ahuja; Vikas Srivastava; Chandraprakash Thakur	N.J Lalwani Films	
J A N	11	The Accidental Prime Minister	Vijay Ratnakar Gutte	Anupam Kher; Akshaye Khanna; Suzanne Bernert; Aahana Kumra; Arjun Mathur	Pen Studios, Rudra Productions, Bohra Bros.	
J A N	11	Evening Shadows	Sridhar Rangayan	Mona Ambegaonkar; Ananth Narayan Mahadevan; Devansh Doshi; Arpit Chaudhary	Solaris Pictures	
J A N	18	Why Cheat India	Soumik Sen	Emraan Hashmi; Shreya Dhanwanthary	T-Series Films, Ellipsis Entertainment, Emraan Hashmi Films	
J A N	18	SP Chauhan	Manoj K Jha	Jimmy Shergill; Yuvika Chaudhary; Yashpal Sharma	Navchetna Productions, T-Series	
J A N	18	Fraud Saiyaan	Sourabh Shrivastava	Arshad Warsi; Sara Loren; Saurabh Shukla	Prakash Jha Productions, Drama King Entertainment	
J A N	18	Soni	Ivan Ayr	Geetika Vidhya Olyan; Saloni Batra	Jabberwockee Talkies, The Film Cafe, Netflix	
J A N	18	72 Hours: Martyr Who Never Died	Avinash Dhyani	Avinash Dhyani; Mukesh Tiwari; Virendra Saxena; Alka Amin Shishir Sharma; Gireesh Sahdev; Prashil Rawat	JSR Production House	
J A N	18	Bombairiya	Pia Sukanya	Radhika Apte; Siddhanth Kapoor; Akshay Oberoi; Shilpa Shukla; Adil Hussain; Amit Sial; Ravi Kishan	TriStar Pictures, Zee Studios, Beautiful Bay Entertainment, Krio Films FZ	
J A N	18	Rangeela Raja	Sikander Bharti	Govinda; Shakti Kapoor; Prem Chopra; Govind Namdev; Shyamlal Yadav; Mishika Chourasia; Anupama Agnihotri; Digangana Suryavanshi; Karishma Harshada; Arti Gupta	Chitradeep International	
J A N	25	Thackeray	Abhijit Panse	Nawazuddin Siddiqui; Amrita Rao	Viacom18 Motion Pictures, Carnival Motion Pictures, Raut'ers Entertainment	
J A N	25	Manikarnika: The Queen of Jhansi	Radha Krishna Jagarlamudi; Kangana Ranaut	Kangana Ranaut; Jisshu Sengupta; Suresh Oberoi; Ankita Lokhande; Danny Denzongappa; Atul Kulkarni; Mohammed Zeeshan Ayyub	Zee Studios, Kairos Kontent, EaseMyTrip	
F E B	1	Ek Ladki Ko Dekha Toh Aisa Laga	Shelly Chopra Dhar	Anil Kapoor; Sonam Kapoor; Juhi Chawla; Rajkummar Rao	Fox Star Studios, Vinod Chopra Films	
F E B	8	The Fakir of Venice	Anand Surapur	Farhan Akhtar; Annu Kapoor	October Films, Phat Phish Motion Pictures	
F E B	8	Dosti Ke Side Effects	Hadi Ali Abrar	Sapna Choudhry; Vikrant Anand; Neel Motwani; Zuber K. Khan; Anju Jadhav	Share Happiness Films	
F E B	8	Amavas	Bhushan Patel	Sachiin Joshi; Vivan Bhatena; Nargis Fakhri	Weeping Grave	
F E B	14	Gully Boy	Zoya Akhtar	Ranveer Singh; Alia Bhatt	Excel Entertainment, Tiger Baby	
F E B	15	Hum Chaar	Abhishek Dixit	Prit Kamani; Simran Sharma; Anshuman Malhotra; Tushar Pandey	Rajshri Productions	
F E B	22	Total Dhamaal	Indra Kumar	Ajay Devgn; Madhuri Dixit; Arshad Warsi; Javed Jaffrey; Anil Kapoor; Riteish Deshmukh; Sanjay Mishra; Esha Gupta	Fox Star Studios, Ajay Devgn FFilms, Maruti International, Sri Adhikari Brothers Motion Pictures, Anand Pandit Motion Pictures	
M A R	1	Goopi Gawaiya Bagha Bajaiya	Shilpa Ranade	Manish Bhawan; Rajeev Raj; Shailendra Pande	Paperboat Animation Studios, Children's Film Society, Karadi Tales	
M A R	1	Luka Chuppi	Laxman Utekar	Kartik Aaryan; Kriti Sanon; Aparshakti Khurana; Pankaj Tripathi; Vinay Pathak	Maddock Films, Jio Studios	
M A R	1	Sonchiriya	Abhishek Chaubey	Sushant Singh Rajput; Bhumi Pednekar; Manoj Bajpayee; Ranvir Shorey; Ashutosh Rana	RSVP Movies, MacGuffin Pictures	
M A R	8	Badla	Sujoy Ghosh	Amitabh Bachchan; Taapsee Pannu	Red Chillies Entertainment, Azure Entertainment, Ael One	
M A R	8	The Sholay Girl	Aditya Sarpotdar	Bidita Bag; Chandan Roy Sanyal	Purple Morning Pictures, ZEE5	
M A R	15	Hamid	Aijaz Khan	Talha Arshad Reshi; Rasika Dugal; Vikas Kumar; Sumit Kaul	Yoodlee Films	
M A R	15	Photograph	Ritesh Batra	Nawazuddin Siddiqui; Sanya Malhotra	Amazon Studios, The Match Factory, Poetic License Motion Pictures, FilmScience, Pola Pandora, KNM, Medienboard BerlinBrandenBurg, FFA	
M A R	15	Milan Talkies	Tigmanshu Dhulia	Ali Fazal; Shraddha Srinath; Reecha Sinha; Ashutosh Rana; Sanjay Mishra; Sikandar Kher	Filmy Keeda Productions Pvt Ltd	
M A R	15	Risknamaa	Aarun Nagar	Sachin Khari; Aarun Nagar; Shahbaz Khan; Pramod Moutho; Ravi Verma	Kirti Motion Pictures, CSK Production	
M A R	15	Mere Pyare Prime Minister	Rakeysh Omprakash Mehra	Anjali Patil; Makarand Deshpande; Rasika Aagashe; Sonia Albizuri; Syna Anand; Adarsh Bharti; Om Kanojiya	Pen Studios, ROMP Pictures	
M A R	15	22 Yards	Mitali Ghoshal	Barun Sobti; Amartya Ray; Panchi Bora; Rajit Kapur; Rajesh Sharma; Chaiti Ghoshal; Geetika Tyagi	MS Productions	
M A R	19	377 Ab Normal	Faruk Kabir	Shashank Arora; Mohammed Zeeshan Ayyub; Tanvi Azmi; Maanvi Gagroo	Spiders Web Productions, ZEE5	
M A R	21	Kesari	Anurag Singh	Akshay Kumar; Parineeti Chopra; Mir Sarwar; Ashwath Bhatt	Zee Studios, Dharma Productions, Cape of Good Films, Azure Entertainment	
M A R	21	Mard Ko Dard Nahi Hota	Vasan Bala	Abhimanyu Dassani; Radhika Madan; Gulshan Devaiah; Mahesh Manjrekar; Jimit Trivedi; Shweta Basu Prasad	RSVP Movies	
M A R	29	Ram Ki Janmabhoomi	Sanoj Mishra	Govind Namdeo; Manoj Joshi; Najneen Patni; Rajveer Singh	Cine Craft Productions	
M A R	29	Notebook	Nitin Kakkar	Zaheer Iqbal; Pranutan Bahl	Salman Khan Films, Cine1 Studios	
M A R	29	Junglee	Chuck Russell	Vidyut Jammwal; Pooja Sawant; Asha Bhat; Atul Kulkarni	Junglee Pictures	
M A R	29	Gone Kesh	Qasim Khallow	Shweta Tripathi; Jitendra Kumar; Vipin Sharma; Deepika Amin; Brijendra Kala	Eros International, Dhirendra Nath Ghosh Films	

== April–June ==
Opening		Title	Director	Cast	Studio (production house)	Ref.
A P R	5	Romeo Akbar Walter	Robbie Garewal	John Abraham; Mouni Roy; Jackie Shroff; Sikander Kher; Suchitra Krishnamoorthi	Viacom18 Motion Pictures, Kyta Productions, VA Film Company, Red Ice Productions	
A P R	5	Jai Chhathi Maa	Murari Sinha	Ravi Kishan, Gurleen Chopra, Preeti Jhangiani	Shining Screens	
A P R	12	Albert Pinto Ko Gussa Kyun Aata Hai?	Soumitra Ranade	Manav Kaul; Nandita Das; Saurabh Shukla; Kishor Kadam	Soumitra Ranade Productions, Templetree Motion Pictures, No Guts No Glory Films, Parashuram Productions, Paperboat Studios Pvt. Ltd.	
A P R	12	The Tashkent Files	Vivek Agnihotri	Mithun Chakraborty; Naseeruddin Shah; Shweta Basu Prasad; Pankaj Tripathi; Vinay Pathak; Mandira Bedi; Pallavi Joshi; Ankur Rathee; Prakash Belawadi	SP CineCorp	
A P R	12	Blackboard vs Whiteboard	Tarun S. Bisht	Raghubir Yadav, Ashok Samarth, Akhilendra Mishra		
A P R	17	Kalank	Abhishek Varman	Madhuri Dixit; Sonakshi Sinha; Alia Bhatt; Varun Dhawan; Aditya Roy Kapur; Sanjay Dutt	Fox Star Studios, Dharma Productions, Nadiadwala Grandson Entertainment	
A P R	19	Music Teacher	Sarthak Dasgupta	Manav Kaul; Divya Dutta; Neena Gupta	Saregama, Yoodlee Films, Netflix	
M A Y	3	Blank	Behzad Khambata	Sunny Deol; Karan Kapadia; Ishita Dutta	Echelon Productions	
M A Y	3	Setters	Ashwini Chaudhary	Aftab Shivdasani; Shreyas Talpade; Sonnalli Seygall; Ishita Dutta; Pavan Malhotra; Vijay Raaz; Jameel Khan; Manu Rishi	Lovely Films Production House (P) Ltd., NH Studioz	
M A Y	3	Yours Truly	Sanjoy Nag	Soni Razdan; Aahana Kumra; Pankaj Tripathi	ZEE5	
M A Y	10	Badnaam Gali	Ashwin Shetty	Patralekha Paul; Divyendu Sharma	Finnca Films, ZEE5	
M A Y	10	Chhota Bheem Kung Fu Dhamaka (Note: Bilingual film, also released in English)	Rajiv Chilaka	Parigna Pandya Shah; Julie Tejwani; Pinky Rajput; Rajesh Kava	Green Gold Animations	
M A Y	10	Student of the Year 2	Punit Malhotra	Tiger Shroff; Tara Sutaria; Ananya Panday	Fox Star Studios, Dharma Productions	
M A Y	17	Chhoriyan Chhoron Se Kam Nahi Hoti	Rajesh Amarlal Babbar	Satish Kaushik; Rashmi Somvanshi	Zee Studios, The Satish Kaushik Entertainment	
M A Y	17	Gunwali Dulhaniya	Shantanu Anant Tambe	Kanchan Awasthi; Mayur Kumar; Elvis Chaturvedi; Govind Namdev; Brijendra Kala	Passionwoald Entertainments	
M A Y	17	De De Pyaar De	Akiv Ali	Ajay Devgn; Tabu; Rakul Preet Singh; Jimmy Sheirgill	T-Series Films, Luv Films	
M A Y	24	India's Most Wanted	Rajkumar Gupta	Arjun Kapoor; Sudev Nair; Rajesh Sharma; Prashanth Alexander; Shantilal Mukherjee	Fox Star Studios, Raapchik Films	
M A Y	24	PM Narendra Modi	Omung Kumar	Vivek Oberoi; Boman Irani; Manoj Joshi; Barkha Sengupta; Aanjjan Srivastav; Zarina Wahab; Suresh Oberoi	Legend Global Studio, Anand Pandit Motion Pictures, Panorama Studios	
M A Y	24	Yeh Hai India	Lomharsh	Gavie Chahal; Mohan Aghashe; Mohan Joshi	DLB Films	
M A Y	31	Chopsticks	Sachin Yardi	Abhay Deol; Mithila Palkar; Vijay Raaz	Viniyard Productions, Netflix	
J U N	5	Bharat	Ali Abbas Zafar	Salman Khan; Tabu; Katrina Kaif; Sunil Grover; Disha Patani; Aasif Sheikh	T-Series Films, Salman Khan Films, Reel Life Productions	
J U N	14	Khamoshi	Chakri Toleti	Prabhu Deva; Tamannaah; Bhumika Chawla	Pooja Entertainment	
J U N	14	Kissebaaz	Annant Jaaitpaal	Pankaj Tripathi; Anupriya Goenka; Evelyn Sharma; Rahul Bagga; Mouli Ganguly; Zakir Hussain; Rajesh Sharma	Experion Moviez, PVR Pictures	
J U N	21	Jaoon Kahan Bata Ae Dil	Aadish Keluskar	Khushboo Upadhyay; Rohit Kokate	Humara Movie, Netflix	
J U N	21	Kabir Singh	Sandeep Vanga	Shahid Kapoor; Kiara Advani; Soham Majumdar; Arjan Bajwa; Kamini Kaushal; Nikita Dutta; Amit Sharma; Kunal Thakur; Swati Seth; Anusha Sampath; Suresh Oberoi	T-Series Films, Cine1 Studios	
J U N	28	Article 15	Anubhav Sinha	Ayushmann Khurrana; Isha Talwar; Nassar; Manoj Pahwa; Sayani Gupta; Kumud Mishra; Mohammed Zeeshan Ayyub	Zee Studios, Benaras Media Works	

== July–September ==
Opening		Title	Director	Cast	Studio (production house)	Ref.
J U L	5	Malaal	Mangesh Hadawale	Meezaan Jaffery; Sharmin Segal	T-Series Films, Bhansali Productions	
J U L	5	One Day: Justice Delivered	Ashok Nanda	Anupam Kher; Esha Gupta; Kumud Mishra	A Cinema Friday International Production	
J U L	5	Hume Tumse Pyaar Kitna	Lalit Mohan	Karanvir Bohra; Priya Banerjee; Samir Kochhar; Mahesh Balraj	Belvie Productions	
J U L	5	Marudhar Express	Vishal Mishra	Kunaal Roy Kapur; Tara Alisha Berry; Rajesh Sharma	Raywings Entertainment, Atharva Motion Pictures	
J U L	12	Super 30	Vikas Bahl	Hrithik Roshan; Mrunal Thakur; Amit Sadh; Pankaj Tripathi	Reliance Entertainment, HRX Films, Nadiadwala Grandson Entertainment, Phantom Films	
J U L	19	Family of Thakurganj	Manoj K. Jha	Jimmy Sheirgill; Mahie Gill; Saurabh Shukla; Sudhir Pandey; Supriya Pilgaonkar; Pavan Malhotra; Mukesh Tiwari; Nandish Singh; Yashpal Sharma; Pranati Rai Prakash; Raj Zutshi; Salil Acharya; Manoj Pahwa	Lovely World Entertainment	
J U L	19	Jhootha Kahin Ka	Smeep Kang	Rishi Kapoor; Omkar Kapoor; Sunny Singh; Jimmy Sheirgill; Lillete Dubey; Manoj Joshi	Soham Rockstar Entertainment	
J U L	26	Judgementall Hai Kya	Prakash Kovelamudi	Kangana Ranaut; Rajkummar Rao; Jimmy Sheirgill; Amyra Dastur; Amrita Puri	Balaji Motion Pictures	
J U L	26	Arjun Patiala	Rohit Jugraj	Diljit Dosanjh; Kriti Sanon; Varun Sharma; Ronit Roy	T-Series Films, Maddock Films, Bake My Cake Films	
A U G	2	Khandaani Shafakhana	Shilpi Dasgupta	Sonakshi Sinha; Varun Sharma; Annu Kapoor; Badshah	T-Series Films, Sundial Studios, Anand Pandit Motion Pictures	
A U G	7	Barot House	Bugs Bhargava	Amit Sadh; Manjari Fadnis	Dhirajj Walks Of Art, Faizee Productions, Ten Years Younger Productions, ZEE5	
A U G	9	Jabariya Jodi	Prashant Singh	Sidharth Malhotra; Parineeti Chopra	Balaji Motion Pictures, Karma Media & Entertainment	
A U G	9	Chicken Curry Law	Shekhar Sirrinn	Ashutosh Rana; Nivedita Bhattacharya; Makrand Deshpande; Zakir Hussain; Aman Verma; Natalia Janoszek	Panorama Studios	
A U G	9	Pranaam	Sanjiv Jaiswal	Rajeev Khandelwal; Sameksha; Shaji Chaudhary; Atul Kulkarni; Abhimanyu Singh; Vikram Gokhale	Rudraksh Adventures Pvt. Ltd, Woodside Infrastructure Pvt. Ltd, Reel & Motion Pictures LLP.	
A U G	15	Batla House	Nikhil Advani	John Abraham; Mrunal Thakur	T-Series Films, Emmay Entertainment	
A U G	15	Mission Mangal	Jagan Shakti	Akshay Kumar; Vidya Balan; Sharman Joshi; Sonakshi Sinha; Taapsee Pannu; Kirti Kulhari; Nithya Menen	Fox Star Studios, Cape of Good Films, Hope Productions	
A U G	23	Posham Pa	Suman Mukhopadhyay	Mahie Gill; Sayani Gupta; Ragini Khanna	Dhirajj Walks Of Art, Faizee Productions, Ten Years Younger Productions, ZEE5	
A U G	30	Saaho (Note: Bilingual film, also made in Telugu)	Sujeeth	Prabhas; Neil Nitin Mukesh; Shraddha Kapoor; Jackie Shroff	T-Series Films, UV Creations	
S E P	6	Chhichhore	Nitesh Tiwari	Sushant Singh Rajput; Shraddha Kapoor; Varun Sharma; Prateik Babbar; Tahir Raj Bhasin; Naveen Polishetty; Tushar Pandey; Saharsh Shukla	Fox Star Studios, Nadiadwala Grandson Entertainment, Earthsky Pictures	
S E P	13	Dream Girl	Raaj Shaandilyaa	Ayushmann Khurrana; Nushrat Bharucha	Balaji Motion Pictures	
S E P	13	Section 375	Ajay Bahl	Akshaye Khanna; Richa Chadha; Rahul Bhat; Meera Chopra	T-Series Films, Panorama Studios	
S E P	19	Main Zaroor Aaunga	Chandrakant Singh	Arbaaz Khan, Aindrita Ray, Vikas Verma, Govind Namdev	AShirwad CineVision Pvt Ltd	
S E P	20	The Zoya Factor	Abhishek Sharma	Sonam Kapoor; Dulquer Salmaan; Sanjay Kapoor	Fox Star Studios, Adlabs Films	
S E P	20	Pal Pal Dil Ke Paas	Sunny Deol	Karan Deol; Sahher Bambba	Zee Studios, Sunny Sounds	
S E P	20	Prassthanam	Deva Katta	Sanjay Dutt; Manisha Koirala; Jackie Shroff; Chunky Pandey; Ali Fazal; Amyra Dastur; Satyajeet Dubey	NH Studioz, Sanjay Dutt Productions	

== October–December ==
Opening		Title	Director	Cast	Studio (production house)	Ref.
O C T	2	War	Siddharth Anand	Hrithik Roshan; Tiger Shroff; Vaani Kapoor	Yash Raj Films	
O C T	11	The Sky Is Pink	Shonali Bose	Priyanka Chopra; Farhan Akhtar; Zaira Wasim; Rohit Suresh Saraf	RSVP Movies, Roy Kapur Films, SK Global Entertainment, Purple Pebble Pictures	
O C T	18	Chappad Phaad Ke	Sameer Hemant Joshi	Vinay Pathak; Siddharth Menon; Ayesha Raza Mishra; Sheetal Thakur	Yoodlee Films, Hotstar	
O C T	18	Ghost	Vikram Bhatt	Sanaya Irani; Shivam Bhaargava	Pooja Entertainment	
O C T	18	Laal Kaptaan	Navdeep Singh	Saif Ali Khan; Manav Vij; Zoya Hussain; Deepak Dobriyal; Simone Singh	Eros International, Colour Yellow Productions	
O C T	18	P Se Pyaar F Se Faraar	Manoj Tiwari	Jimmy Sheirgill; Kumud Mishra; Bhavesh Kumar	OK Movies, PVR Pictures,	
O C T	18	Upstarts	Udai Singh Pawar	Priyanshu Painyuli; Chandrachoor Rai; Shadab Kamal; Sheetal Thakur	Bandra West Pictures, Netflix	
O C T	18	Yaaram	Ovais Khan	Prateik Babbar; Siddhanth Kapoor; Ishita Raj Sharma	Yashavvi Films	
O C T	18	Officer Arjun Singh IPS Batch 2000	Arshad Siddiqui	Priyanshu Chatterjee; Raai Laxmi	Shreya Films International	
O C T	18	Jacqueline I Am Coming	Banty Dubey	Raghubir Yadav, Diiva Dhanoya, Shakti Kumar	MD Production	
O C T	25	Housefull 4	Farhad Samji	Akshay Kumar; Ritesh Deshmukh; Bobby Deol; Kriti Sanon; Pooja Hegde; Kriti Kharbanda; Chunky Pandey; Ranjeet; Rana Daggubati	Fox Star Studios, Nadiadwala Grandson Entertainment	
O C T	25	Kanpuriye	Ashish Aryan	Aparshakti Khurana; Divyenndu; Harsh Mayar; Vijay Raaz; Rajshri Deshpande; Harshita Gaur	Yoodlee Films, Hotstar	
O C T	25	Made in China	Mikhil Musale	Rajkummar Rao; Mouni Roy; Boman Irani; Gajraj Rao; Sumeet Vyas; Amyra Dastur; Paresh Rawal	Jio Studios, Maddock Films	
O C T	25	Saand Ki Aankh	Tushar Hiranandani	Bhumi Pednekar; Taapsee Pannu; Prakash Jha; Vineet Kumar Singh	Reliance Entertainment, Chalk 'N' Cheese Film Productions	
N O V	1	Drive	Tarun Mansukhani	Sushant Singh Rajput; Jacqueline Fernandez; Vikramjeet Virk; Sapna Pabbi; Boman Irani; Pankaj Tripathi	Dharma Productions, Netflix	
N O V	1	Ujda Chaman	Abhishek Pathak	Sunny Singh; Maanvi Gagroo; Karishma Sharma; Aishwarya Sakhuja	Panorama Studios, PVR Pictures	
N O V	8	Bala	Amar Kaushik	Ayushmann Khurrana; Bhumi Pednekar; Yami Gautam; Saurabh Shukla; Javed Jaffrey; Seema Pahwa	Maddock Films, Jio Studios	
N O V	8	Bypass Road	Naman Nitin Mukesh	Neil Nitin Mukesh; Adah Sharma; Shama Sikander; Gul Panag; Rajit Kapur; Sudhanshu Pandey	Miraj Creations, NNM Films	
N O V	8	Moothon (Note: Bilingual film, also released in Malayalam)	Geetu Mohandas	Nivin Pauly; Sanjana Dipu; Shashank Arora; Sobhita Dhulipala; Dileesh Pothan; Jim Sarbh; Roshan Mathew	Mini Studio, JAR Pictures	
N O V	8	Satellite Shankar	Irfan Kamal	Sooraj Pancholi; Megha Akash	T-Series Films, Cine1 Studios	
N O V	14	Jhalki	Brahmanand S. Siingh	Boman Irani; Tannishtha Chatterjee; Divya Dutta; Sanjay Suri; Yatin Karyekar; Akhilendra Mishra; Govind Namdev; Joy Sengupta	Mobius Films	
N O V	15	House Arrest	Shashanka Ghosh and Samit Basu	Ali Fazal; Shriya Pilgaonkar; Jim Sarbh	India Stories Media & Entertainment, Netflix	
N O V	15	Keep Safe Distance	Raama Mehra	Kiran Kumar; Shahbaz Khan	Rama Dhanraj Production	
N O V	15	Marjaavaan	Milap Milan Zaveri	Sidharth Malhotra; Riteish Deshmukh; Tara Sutaria; Rakul Preet Singh	T-Series Films, Emmay Entertainment	
N O V	15	Motichoor Chaknachoor	Debamitra Biswal	Nawazuddin Siddiqui; Athiya Shetty	Viacom18 Motion Pictures, Woodpecker Movies	
N O V	15	Marne Bhi Do Yaaron	Kashmera Shah	Krishna Abhishek; Kashmera Shah; Rishaab Chauhaan	Boo Filmz	
N O V	22	Pagalpanti	Anees Bazmee	Anil Kapoor; John Abraham; Ileana D'Cruz; Arshad Warsi; Pulkit Samrat; Kriti Kharbanda; Urvashi Rautela; Saurabh Shukla	T-Series Films, Panorama Studios	
N O V	29	Commando 3	Aditya Datt	Vidyut Jammwal; Adah Sharma; Angira Dhar; Gulshan Devaiah	Motion Pictures Capital, Reliance Entertainment	
N O V	29	Yeh Saali Aashiqui	Cherag Ruparel	Vardhan Puri; Shivaleeka Oberoi	Pen Studios, Amrish Puri Films	
D E C	6	Panipat	Ashutosh Gowariker	Sanjay Dutt; Arjun Kapoor; Kriti Sanon; Mohnish Bahl	Ashutosh Gowariker Productions, Vision World Films	
D E C	6	Pati Patni Aur Woh	Mudassar Aziz	Kartik Aaryan; Bhumi Pednekar; Ananya Panday	T-Series Films, B.R. Studios	
D E C	13	Mardaani 2	Gopi Puthran	Rani Mukerji; Vishal Jethwa; Jisshu Sengupta	Yash Raj Films	
D E C	13	The Body	Jeethu Joseph	Emraan Hashmi; Rishi Kapoor; Vedhika; Sobhita Dhulipala	Viacom18 Motion Pictures, Azure Entertainment	
D E C	20	Dabangg 3	Prabhu Deva	Salman Khan; Sonakshi Sinha; Sudeep; Saiee Manjrekar; Arbaaz Khan	Salman Khan Films, Arbaaz Khan Production, Saffron Broadcast & Media	
D E C	20	Line of Descent (Note: Bilingual film, also released in English)	Rohit Karn Batra	Brendan Fraser; Abhay Deol; Ronit Roy; Neeraj Kabi; Prem Chopra; Ali Haji	Brillstein Entertainment Partners, Invisible Man Pictures, Level Street Pictures	
D E C	25	Happi	Bhavna Talwar	Pankaj Kapoor; Supriya Pathak; Hrishitaa Bhatt	Vistaar Religare Film Fund, WSG Pictures	
D E C	27	Good Newwz	Raj Mehta	Akshay Kumar; Kareena Kapoor; Diljit Dosanjh; Kiara Advani	Zee Studios, Dharma Productions, Cape of Good Films	

== See also ==
- List of Bollywood films of 2020
- List of Bollywood films of 2018
