= Offline (2026 film) =

- Directed by: Vijay Suthar
- Written by: Vijay Suthar
- Produced by: Yunas Ali Khan; Nikhil Takle; VijaySuthar
- Cinematography: Raj Ashiwal
- Music by: D.J. Bharali; Ankita Chauhan; Raja Hasan
- Release date: 3 April 2026
- Running time: 113 Minutes
- Country: India
- Language: Rajasthani

Offline is an Indian Rajasthani film written and directed by Vijay Suthar and released on 3 April 2026. Actor Sudesh Berry worked in the Bagri dialect for the film. It was screened in Noida. The film features Javed Khan, Sudesh Berry, Neelu Vaghela, Karan Maan, Gulshan Pandey and Vikram O Singh.

== Plot ==
Kidnapped by her cab driver, Diksha has to fight to survive capture by a gang. Her defense coach, Arshad, tracks her down and sets out on a mission to rescue her and dismantle the entire gang.

== Soundtrack ==
DJ Bharali, Ankita Chauhan & Raja Hasan composed Offline's soundtrack and the lyrics were written by Vijay Suthar. The vocals were performed by Mudasir Ali, Ankita Chauhan, Raja Hasan , Rituraj Mohanty, Shahzad Ali , Kashish Sinha and Rocktim Jazz.

== Cast ==
- Javed Khan
- Sudesh Berry
- Neelu Vaghela
- Gulshan Pandey
- Karan Maan
- Altaf Hussain
- Ashish Jain
- Vikram O Singh
- Aishmita Meena
- Riya Saini
- Heena Thakur
