= The Pushkar Lodge =

2019 Indian film directed by Vijay Suthar

- Directed by: Vijay Suthar
- Written by: Vijay Suthar
- Produced by: Parvin Dabase; Inder Kumar Suthar; Vijay Suthar
- Cinematography: Pappu k Shetty
- Music by: D.J. Bharali; Vijay Suthar
- Release date: 2019
- Country: India
- Language: Hindi

The Pushkar Lodge is a 2019 Indian Hindi-language crime thriller film, that deals with the problem of drugs and child-trafficking in India, directed by Vijay Suthar and produced by Inder Kumar Suthar. The film stars Preeti Jhangiani with Pradeep Kabra, Gulshan Pandey and Rituraj Mohanty in supporting roles. Disco king Bappi Lahiri lauds the Trailer of film and it received positive reviews. The film released on 15 March 2019.

== Plot ==
The pushkar lodge is story of a lost child who want to go home back but he forgot everything, a girl tourist comes from mumbai and try to get reach him home but she also get stuck with some powerful drug suppliers.

== Soundtrack ==
There is 5 music tracks in movie composed by DJ Bharali & written by Vijay Suthar, release on Zee Music Company

Song	Singers	Composer	Lyricist
Zindagi Lena Zara	Baljinder Singh & Veda Nerurkar	DJ Bharali	Vijay Suthar
Mhara Dholna	Rituraj Mohanty	Vijay Suthar	Vijay Suthar
Padharo Rajasthan	Raja Hasan	DJ Bharali	Vijay Suthar
Lamhe	Mudasir Ali & Antara Chakraborty	DJ Bharali	Vijay Suthar
Tu Bhar Udaan	Devesh Siwal	DJ Bharali	Vijay Suthar

== Cast ==
- Preeti Jhangiani - Papal
- Anil Chahar - Paagal
- Athar Siddiqui- Paagal brother
- Pradeep Kabra - Bhaagchand
- Vijay Suthar
- Gulshan Pandey - Iqbaal Bhai
- Riney Aryaa
- Sachin Choudhary - Young Paagal
- Rituraj Mohanty - Band Singer
- Raghav Tiwari
