= Bhulan the Maze =

2022 Chhattisgarhi-language drama film

- Directed by: Manoj Verma
- Written by: Manoj Verma
- Based on: Bhulan Kunda by Sanjeev Bakshi
- Produced by: Manoj Verma
- Starring: Omkar Das Manikpuri; Rajendra Gupta; Mukesh Tiwari; Ashok Mishra; Pushpendra Singh; Anuradha Dubey; Ashish Shendre; Anima Pagare; Usha Vishvakarma; Salim Ansari
- Cinematography: Sandeep Sen
- Edited by: Manoj Verma; Tulendra Verma
- Music by: Sunil Soni
- Production company: Swapnil Film Productions
- Release date: 27 May 2022
- Running time: 145 minutes
- Country: India
- Language: Chhattisgarhi

Bhulan the Maze is an Indian Chhattisgarhi language drama film written and directed by Manoj Verma and produced by Swapnil Film Productions. The film is based on Sanjeev Bakshi's novel Bhulan Kanda (Note: There is a plant in Chhattisgarh called “bhulan kaanda”, according to native myth, if you step on that you will forget the way you are going to, and will not recover the situations unless someone touches you.). The film stars Omkar Das Manikpuri, Rajendra Gupta, Mukesh Tiwari, Ashok Mishra and Anima Pagare. It focuses on social justice in the Bhujiya community, a tribal community indigenous to Chhattisgarh state.

== Plot ==
The story presents Bhakla and Birju, who are residents of Mahuabhata. As they are fighting over land one day, Birju dies after accidentally falling on a plough. Bhakla has a family so the villagers are not inclined to send him to jail. Instead they request that Ganjha, a lonely old man from the same village, confess to the murder. Ganjha gets life imprisonment. In the jail the jailor observes Ganjha's noble behaviour that leads him to believe that he cannot be a murderer. The jailor appeals to the high court and the truth is revealed. Ganjha is released, and the villagers are sent to jail for hiding the truth. On their way to jail they realise that the people from the big cities are under the influence of the plant “bhulan”, and they are amazed that these people are not awake. Bhakla had a habit of saying “hao” (yes) before every sentence. When he is presented before the court the prosecutor proves Bhakla guilty of misusing his habit of saying “hao”. Bhakla gets the death penalty. He is later acquitted.

== Cast ==
- Omkar Das Manikpuri as Bhakla
- Rajendra Gupta as Adavocate Tripathi
- Mukesh Tiwari as Public Prosecutor Pandey
- Ashok Mishra as Masterji
- Aanima Pagare as Bhakla wife
- Sanjay Mahanand as Kotwar
- Ashish Shendre as Mukhiya(Head of Village)
- Pushpendra Singh as Thanedaar(Head of Police Station)

== Soundtrack ==
All music is composed by Sunil Soni.

Track listing
No.	Title	Lyrics	Singer(s)	Length
1.	"Jhoomar Jaa Re Padki"	Traditional Song	Manoj Verma, Sanjay Mahanand, Sumit Soni, Tanu Verma, Meenakshi Raut, Kiran Sahu	2:42
2.	"Nanda Jahi Ka Re"	Meer ali Meer	Manoj Verma, Mahadev Hirwani	3:24
3.	"Bhulan Kanda"	Praveen Pravah, Manoj Verma	Kailash Kher	4:47
4.	"Chalo Chalo Jur Mil Jabo Sathi Re"	Sube Singh Chauhan	Sunil Soni	3:45
5.	"Amavas Ki Dehari Maa"	Meer Ali Meer	Sunil Soni	3:46
Total length:				18:25

== Accolades ==
- National Film Awards for Best Feature Film in Chhattisgarhi (2019).
