= Teraa Surroor =

2016 Indian film by Shawn Arranha

- Poster
- Directed by: Shawn Arranha
- Produced by: Vipin Reshammiya; Sonia Kapoor; Rakesh Upadhyay; Bhushan Kumar; Krishan Kumar
- Starring: Himesh Reshammiya; Farah Karimae; Naseeruddin Shah; Shekhar Kapur; Kabir Bedi
- Cinematography: Maneesh Chandra Bhatt
- Edited by: Ashish Gaikar
- Music by: Himesh Reshammiya
- Production companies: HR Musik Limited; T-Series
- Distributed by: T-Series
- Release date: 11 March 2016 (India)
- Running time: 106 minutes
- Country: India
- Language: Hindi
- Box office: ₹20.21 crore

Teraa Surroor (transl. Your Joy) is a 2016 Indian Hindi-language romantic action thriller film directed by Shawn Arranha and produced by Vipin Reshammiya and Sonia Kapoor. It is the sequel to the 2007 film Aap Kaa Surroor. The film was a joint production of T-Series and HR Musik Limited. The film stars Himesh Reshammiya and Farah Karimae. Naseeruddin Shah, Shekhar Kapur, Kabir Bedi, and Monica Dogra play the supporting roles. Teraa Surroor was released on 11 March 2016.

== Plot ==
The film begins with the murder of two Indian origin men in Ireland being killed by a masked man. The story then shifts to Tara Wadia, a singer and the girlfriend of a businessman-cum-gangster Raghu, who lives with her mother. Raghu, it is revealed, is under suspicion from the legal system.

One day, Raghu confesses to Tara that he had spent a night with a prostitute unintentionally. Disappointed, Tara breaks up with him and decides to leave for Ireland, despite her mother trying to convince her of Raghu's goodwill. However, the moment she lands in Dublin, she gets detained after being caught with drugs. Tara calls Raghu for help. Now he must help her and find Anirudh Brahman, the stranger who befriended Tara on Facebook and invited her to Ireland.

Raghu hires a lawyer, Elle Jordan, to rescue Tara and tries to get her bailed out, but the plea is rejected by the judiciary. Fearing a supposedly insurmountable life sentence, Raghu decides to help Tara, during which time, it is revealed that in childhood, he used to work for a gangster, Aurangzeb, who was badly wanted by the law, simply because Aurangzeb had held his mother a slave and she was in need of an operation, for which Raghu wanted money. A man named Anthony, instead, promised to give money for his mother's operation, and Raghu was trained in using a pistol to shoot Aurangzeb. When he proceeded with the task, he initially hesitated to shoot the gangster, but when Aurangzeb insulted his mother, Raghu shot him multiple times without a second thought.

Raghu consults Robin Dharamraj Santino, an infamous convict who has escaped 14 times from prison. Robin says that he would charge him 20 mins each to help him, and Raghu agrees. Robin briefs him all plans and procedures and warns him that he must get Tara out of jail just within 20 minutes before the entire city would lock down by an automatic system. Succeeding in helping Tara escape, Raghu stays back to fight the cops and buy her time.

After a successful escape, Raghu reconciles with Tara after revealing to her that his act of sleeping with the prostitute was actually part of a plan, and that he is actually an undercover assassin who has previously killed many criminals on behalf of Commissioner Afzal A. Khan. Seconds later, he is informed of Anirudh Brahman's location, and upon reaching there, is shocked to find Haider, Tara's close friend and associate, who confesses that he wanted to trap Raghu out of revenge for having killed Aurangzeb, who, it turns out, was his father. Raghu kills him and reunites with Tara. After being freed from prison, Tara reunited with her mother, along with Raghu, in her home.

== Cast ==
- Himesh Reshammiya as Raghu, a gangster and boyfriend of Tara
- Farah Karimaee as Tara Wadia, Raghu's girlfriend
- Naseeruddin Shah as Robin "Bird" Dharamraj Santino, a criminal who helps Raghu
- Shekhar Kapur as Rajeev Kaul, India's Ambassador in Ireland
- Monica Dogra as Elle Jordan, Tara's lawyer
- Kabir Bedi as Afzal A. Khan, Indian Police Commissioner
- Shernaz Patel as Tara's mother
- Suneel Dutt as Drug trafficker
- Myles Molloy as Police Officer Graham Molloy
- Ann Marie O'Connor as Policewoman
- Richard O'Leary as Policeman
- Warren Renwick as Policeman
- Maneesh Chandra Bhatt as Anthony
- Niraj Singh as Farooq Ansari
- Ravi Singh as Indian Man
- Tereza as Neon, a call girl
- Naresh Suri as Indian Police Officer
- Degnan Geraghty as Col. Trueman Head of Irish Intelligence
- Abhishek Duhan as Haider / Anirudh Brahman

== Production ==
=== Marketing ===
The film was made on a budget of ₹110 million (US$1.1 million) from which ₹65 million (US$670,000) was used on the production of the film and the remaining ₹45 million (US$470,000) was spent on marketing. The details about the film were unveiled in December 2015. On 27 January 2016, T-Series released the trailer on YouTube and also unveiled the first look poster through Twitter.

=== Development ===
Reshammiya also did tours before release of the film. He performed in Amsterdam and in different cities of India including Pune, Surat, Hyderabad, Kolkata and New Delhi. Reshammiya also visited Ajmer Sharif Dargah on 8 March 2016 with Farah Karimaee to offer prayers for the success of Teraa Surroor. The director Shawan Arranha has told that the budget of the film was recovered through the music even before the release of film. Arranha said: "The producers have already recovered the film's cost through sale of music, satellite and other rights".

=== Filming ===
The shooting began in the end of 2015. The film was mostly shot in Dublin, Ireland and a small part was also filmed in India.

== Soundtrack ==
Teraa Surroor

Soundtrack album by Himesh Reshammiya
- Released: 2016
- Recorded: 2016
- Venue: Mumbai
- Genre: Feature film soundtrack
- Length: 35:44
- Label: HR Musik Limited
- Producer: Himesh Reshammiya

Himesh Reshammiya chronology
Sanam Teri Kasam (2016)	Teraa Surroor (2016)	Final Cut of Director (2016)

Singles from Teraa Surroor
- 1. "Main Woh Chaand" Released: 29 January 2016

The soundtrack of Teraa Surroor was composed by Reshammiya. The first track of the soundtrack, titled Main Woh Chaand was released on 29 January 2016. It was sung by Darshan Raval. The soundtrack received positive reviews. Mohar Basu of The Times of India rated the music 3 out of 5.

=== Track listing ===
No.	Title	Lyrics	Music	Singer(s)	Length
1.	"Main Woh Chaand"	Sameer	Himesh Reshammiya	Darshan Raval	05:22
2.	"Bekhudi"	Sameer	Himesh Reshammiya	Darshan Raval, Aditi Singh Sharma	05:48
3.	"Wafa Ne Bewafai"	Sameer	Himesh Reshammiya	Arijit Singh, Neeti Mohan, Suzanne D'Mello	05:20
4.	"Teri Yaad"	Shabbir Ahmed	Himesh Reshammiya	Himesh Reshammiya, Badshah	03:54
5.	"Adhuri Zindagi"	Rituraj Mohanty	Himesh Reshammiya	Rituraj Mohanty	06:53
6.	"Ishq Samundar (Reloaded) (Originally composed by Anand Raj Anand)"	Anand Raj Anand	Himesh Reshammiya	Himesh Reshammiya, Kanika Kapoor	03:10
7.	"Teri Yaad" (Reprise)	Shabbir Ahmed	Himesh Reshammiya	Himesh Reshammiya	05:07
8.	"Teraa Surroor" (Mashup)		DJ Kiran Kamath		03:53
Total length:					35:44

== Release ==
The official trailer of the film was released on 27 January 2016. The film was released on 11 March 2016. It was released in more than 1,700 cinemas across India, with over 5,800 shows per day.

== Reception ==
=== Box office ===
On the first weekend, film grossed ₹64.6 million (US$670,000).

=== Soundtrack reception ===
Professional ratings
Review scores
Source	Rating
Bollywood Hungama	4/5 stars
Times of India	3/5 stars

The soundtrack received positive reviews from Bollywood Hungama.

=== Critical reception ===
Professional ratings
Review scores
Source	Rating
Bollywood Hungama	3/5 stars
Hindustan Times	1.5/5 stars
India Today	0.5/5 stars
The Indian Express	0.5/5 stars
NDTV Movies	1.5/5 stars

Shubhra Gupta of The Indian Express said that Himesh Reshammiya's film is a mess. She also said: "The focus stays firmly on Himesh, who remains blank-faced through it all, never cracking a single smile, not even when he is with his girl. All in tons of slo mo, alternating with dizzying camera angles. All drowned in loud background music". Gupta rated the film with a half star.

Saibal Chatterjee of NDTV Movies said: "Teraa Surroor dives deep into a sea of mothballed ideas. No wonders the exercise yields no pearls". He rated the film 1.5 out of 5.
