= Mistake (2013 film) =

- Directed by: S.K Bangalore
- Starring: Vikram Chatterjee; Preeti Jhangiani
- Release date: 31 May 2013
- Country: India
- Language: Bengali

Mistake (Bengali: মিসটেক) is a 2013 Bengali drama film directed by S.K. Bangalore

== Plot ==
Mistake is a story which hovers around the life of five friends. The story explores the problems faced by students during their college and university periods. It shows that if the right time for right work is not used, then it can lead to serious problems. Preeti Jhangiani, Vikram Chatterjee, Malabika, Sourav and Clio are seen in the shoes of five friends while actress Indrani Halder essays a key character. Other actors like Kunal Padhy, Biswajit Chakraborty, Dulal Lahiri and Barun Chatterjee are also in the movie.

== Cast ==
- Vikram Chatterjee
- Preeti Jhangiani
- Malabika
- Sourav
- Clio
- Indrani Halder
- Kunal Padhy
- Biswajit Chakraborty
- Dulal Lahiri
- Barun Chatterjee
