= Rituraj Mohanty =

Indian singer (born 1988)

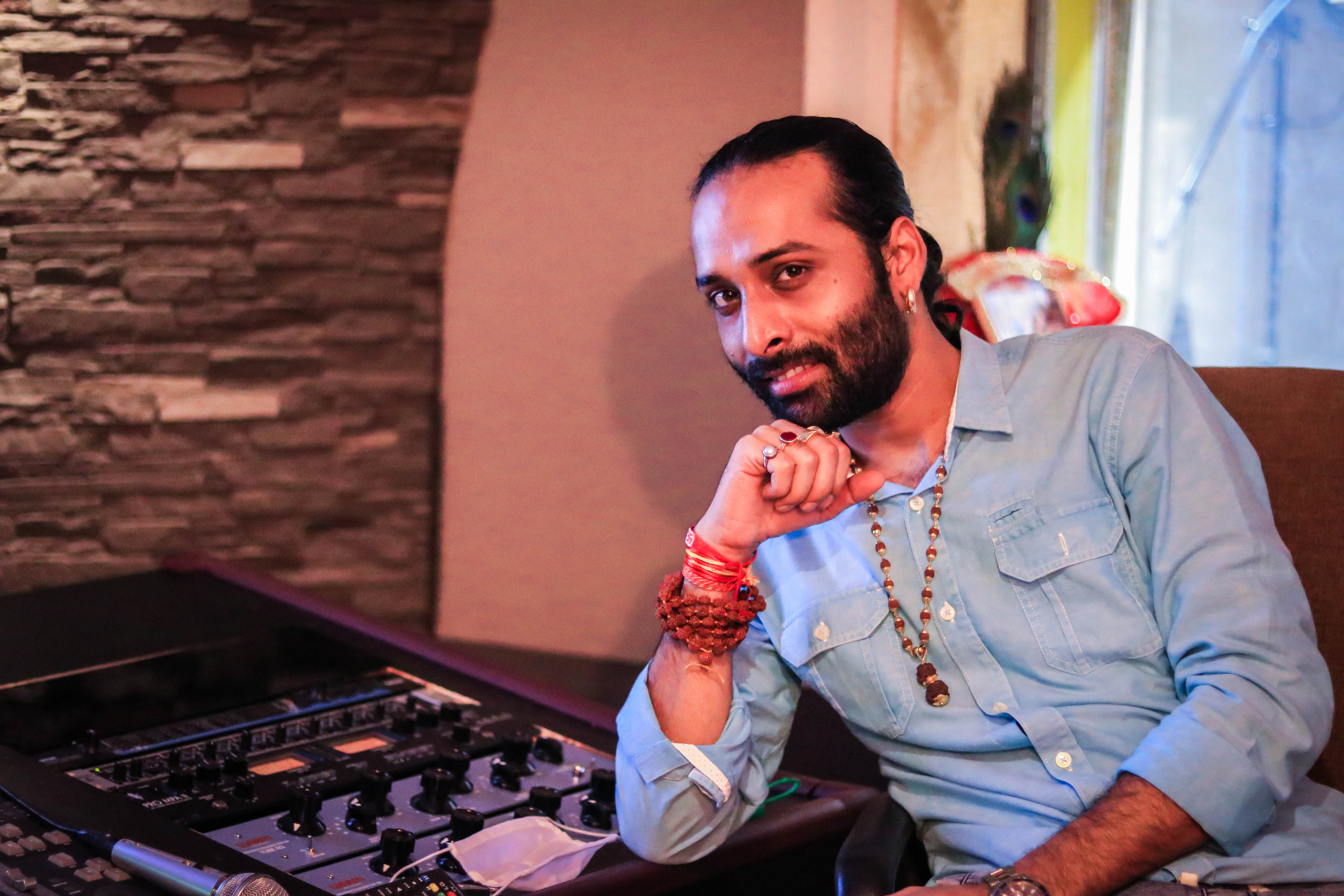
- Born: Nimapada,Puri, Odisha, India
- Occupations: Singer, songwriter
- Years active: 2011–present
- Musical career
- Genres: pop; Sufi; rock
- Instruments: Vocals; drums; guitar
- Labels: T-Series; Viya Music India

Rituraj Mohanty better known by his stage name Rituraj, is an Indian singer. Mohanty is the winner of a singing competition-show India's Raw Star.

== Life and career ==
=== 1988–2011: Early life and career ===
Rituraj Mohanty was born in Nimapada town of Puri district of Odisha. He is the elder son of Sri Chakradhar Mohanty and Pravati Mohanty. Sri Chakradhar Mohanty is a musician (Tabla) by profession and singer in small-time jatra dunia. The cousin elder brother Sri Sumanta Mohanty was a reputed music director in oriya classical music industry. He learnt Odissi music at Utkal Sangeet Mahavidyalaya, Bhubaneswar. He left singing after meeting an accident. He then left for Mumbai seeking for a job and met his family during the show.

=== 2011: Early career and the Raw Star ===
Mohanty was trying to get a break as a professional singer. In 2014, he sang the song "Sahib" in Bollywood movie Bhoothnath Returns. He won as one of the three contestants of the "India's Raw Star" and won the competition. Before that he also sang a song named Aam Ke Aam Honge on Satyamev Jayate (Season 2), then he also got some break in Bollywood industry., recently he sung a song for upcoming movie The Pushkar Lodge and also acted in the movie as a leading singer of a rock band.

=== Hindi songs ===
Key
†	Denotes films that have not yet been released

Film/Album	Song	Composer(s)	Writer(s)	Co-singer(s)	Music label	Year	Ref.				
Made in Heaven	Jiya Jaye		Amanda Sodhi		Amazon Prime Video	2019					
P se Pyaar F se Farraar	Parindey	Ripul Sharma	Ripul Sharma		Zee Music Co	2019					
Sherdil:The Pilibhit Saga	Dhoop Paani Bahne De	Shantanu Moitra	Gulzar	KK (singer)	T-Series	2022					
Ministry Of Finance	Dhanyabaad Odia	Salim-Sulaiman		Antara Nandy	Ministry Of Finance, Govt. Of India	2022					
Main Kaun Hoon	Main Kaun Hoon	Anurag Mahapatra	Sameet Pattnaik	Harirar Dash	Aura Originals	2022					
Imtehaan	Mohabbat Imtehaan Mange	Sushil Dalai			Raado Creation	2022					
The Pushkar Lodge	Mhara Dholna	Vijay Suthar	Vijay Suthar		Zee Music Company	2021					
Gujjubhai Most Wanted	Le Le Meri Jaan	Sagar Desai	Niren Bhatt		Saregama Gujarati	2021					
IPML Soundtracks-Season 1	Mere Shona	Sachin-Jigar		Nikhita Gandhi	Zee Music Company	2021					
Haathi Mere Saathi	Shukriya	Shantanu Moitra			EROS	2021					
Aadhaar	Chanda				Jio Studios	2021					
Made in Heaven	Baraat Company				Sony Music	2021					
Tenu Takeya Bina	Tenu Takeya Bina	Sunil Rajat	Sunil Rajat & Dipanjan		Aura Transmedia	2020					
Budhia Singh – Born to Run	Suna Pua Daud Daud	Sidhant Mathur	Gopal Dutt			2016					
Teraa Surroor	Adhuri Zindagi Hai	Himesh Reshammiya	Himesh Reshammiya	Himesh Reshammiya		2016					
Sunle Maula	Sunle Maula	Sameet Pattnaik, Sudeep Prabhu, Biswajit Mohapatra	Sameet Pattnaik		Viya Music India	2016					
Bangistan	Ishwar Maula	Ram Sampath	Puneet Krishna	Ram Sampath		2015					
Saraaab	Laawaris	Sourabh Shrivastava	Sourabh Shrivastava			2015					
Saraaab	Sajni	Sourabh Shrivastava	Sourabh Shrivastava			2015					
Saraaab	Bharam Hai	Sourabh Shrivastava	Sourabh Shrivastava			2015					
Bhoothnath Returns	Sahib	Ram Sampath	Munna Dhiman	Ram Sampath		2013		2012	Satyamev Jayate 2	Ram Sampath	Suresh Bhatia
Room - The Mystery	Jhalli Jawani	Ajay, Din Mohd	Ronkini Gupta			2013					
Jag Mein Sabse Pyara Naam Sai Ram	Rubaroo Ho Ja Re bande	Krishnakant Sharma	Krishnakant Sharma, Vijay Pratap Sharma			2013					
Jag Mein Sabse Pyara Naam Sai Ram	Jag Mein Sabse Pyara Naam Sai Ram	Krishnakant Sharma	Krishnakant Sharma, Vijay Pratap Sharma			2013					
Malang	Malang	Robin Tamu, Rituraj Mohanty	Shahabuddin Alvi		AMERIMARC, LLC	2023					
Yaadein Teri Yaadein	Yaadein Teri Yaadein	Robin Tamu, Palash Dasgupta, Rituraj Mohanty	Palash Dasgupta		AMERIMARC, LLC	2023					
Dheeme Dheeme	Dheeme Dheeme	Ajay Vas	Ronkini Gupta	Ronkini Gupta, Rituraj Mohanty	Shemaroo	2024					

=== Odia songs ===
Film/Album	Song	Composer(s)	Writer(s)	Co-singer(s)	Year	Ref.
Daman	"Daman - Title Song"	Gaurav Anand			2022	
Bhuli Jibi Tote	"Jebethu Dekhili"	Ritu Raj	Kiran Kishore		2015	
Bhuli Jibi Tote	"Tu Asile College"	Ritu Raj			2015	
Sister Sridevi	"Oh Sunayana"	Abhijit Majumdar	Nirmal Nayak		2017	
Kuhudi	"Satyamev Jayate"	Somesh Satpathy	Sthita Pattnaik		2024	
