= Omkar Das Manikpuri =

Indian stage and film actor (born 1970)

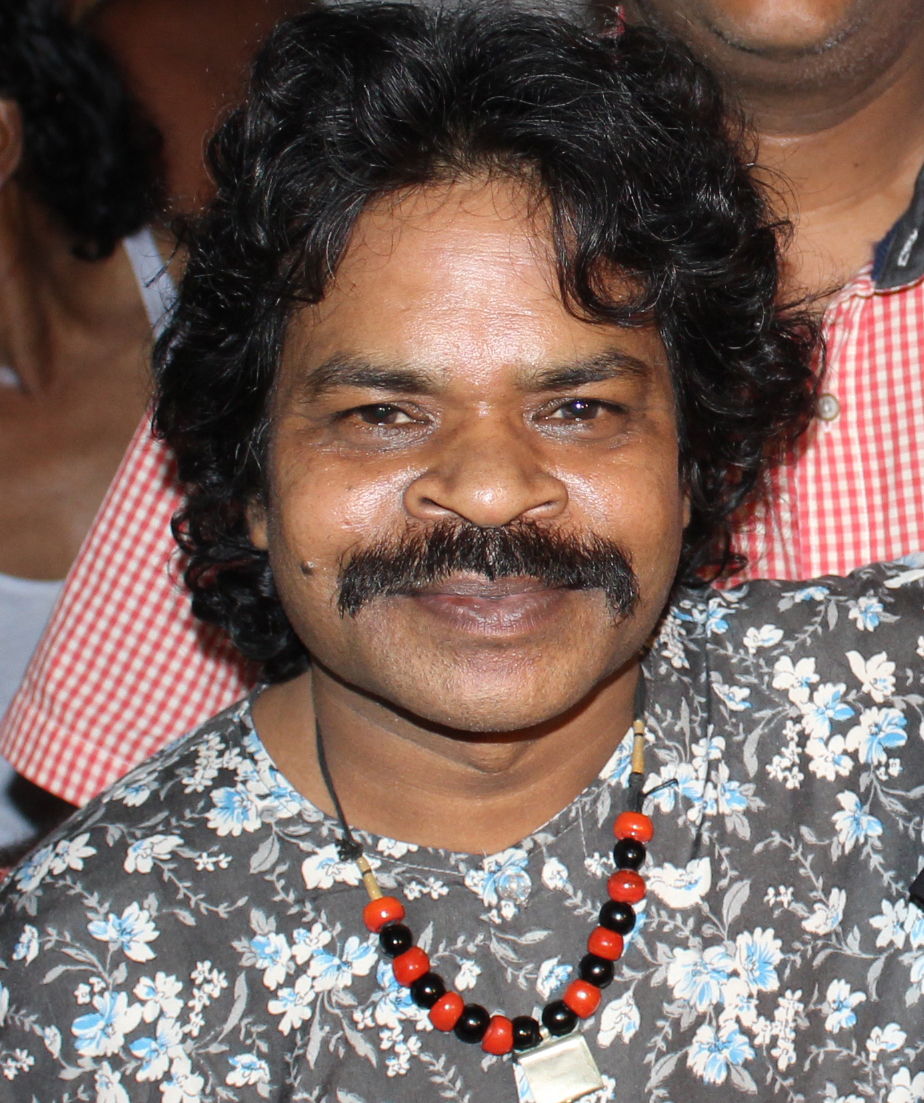
- Born: 5 August 1970 (age 56); Brindanagar, Bhilai, Chhattisgarh,
- Occupation: Actor
- Years active: 2010–present

Omkar Das Manikpuri is an Indian stage and film actor. He is a member of folk-theatre doyen Habib Tanvir's, Naya Theatre company. Manikpuri made his Hindi film debut as a lead in Peepli Live in 2010.

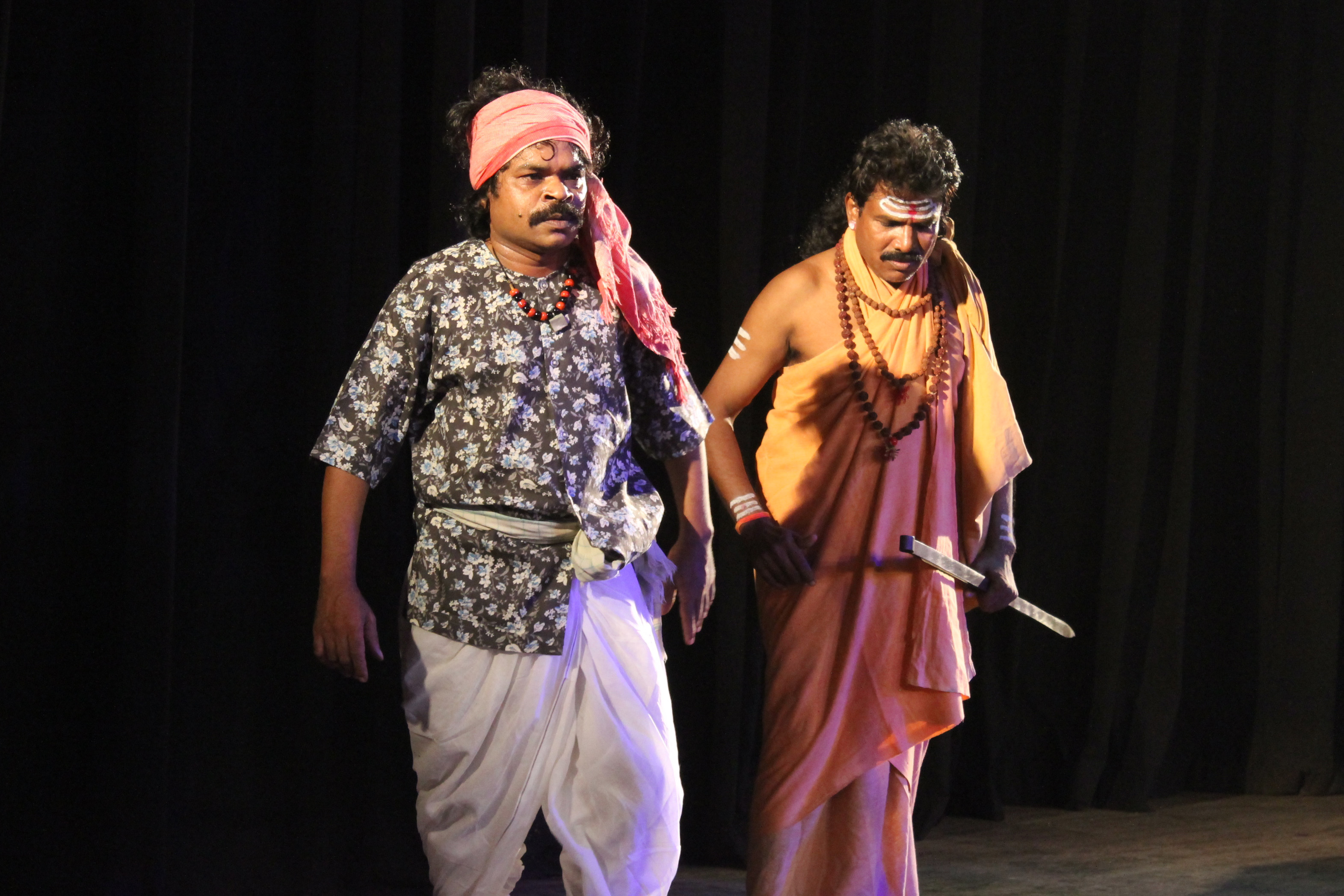
Charandas Chor Play at Bharat Bhavan Bhopal

== Early life ==
Manikpuri was born in Bhilai, Chhattisgarh where he attended school until fifth grade when the death of his father forced him to join a village folk-theatre troupe, Mandali. He shifted to Brindanagar (Ward No. 20) in Bhilai in 1981.

== Career ==
Manikpuri started his career at the age of 17, as a performer in the local form of folk theatre called Nacha and joined an itinerant village theatre group. Performing often in makeshift and open air stages, he performed as a singer, dancer, mimic and a stand-up comic. Later he joined Naya Theatre which was founded by Habib Tanvir in Bhopal. With the Naya Theatre he has performed, in India and abroad, classics such as Agra Bazaar, Charandas Chor, Kamdev ka Apna Basant Ritu ka Sapna and Sadak. It was during a performance of the popular play Charandas Chor in Bhopal, that he was noticed by Anusha Rizvi and Mahmood Farooqui, the co-directors of the film, which led to him auditioning for the film in Bhopal.

In 2010, Manikpuri made his film debut in Bollywood with Aamir Khan productions' Peepli Live, in which he played the lead. Initially he had auditioned for the minor role of Machua, but later was given the lead of Natha, which was till then reportedly to be played by Aamir Khan. In 2014, he performed in Ebn-E-Batuta, directed by Varun Middha. Beginning in 2015, he played Jagannath in the television series Santoshi Maa. In 2017, he performed in the Rajasthani language film Taawdo The Sunlight, he also acted in bollywood film Newton. In 2019, he acted in the Malayalam film Unda alongside Mammootty.

In 2023 released Red Chillies Entertainments' (Atlee directorial and Shah Rukh Khan starrer) Jawan, Manikpuri played Leher Khan's father, a Dalit farmer and a loving father who is unable to repay a loan and ultimately hangs himself to aid his daughter's education through the suicide-compensation amount provided by the government, similar to his character from Peepli Live.

== Personal life ==
Manikpuri's seven-member family lives in Bhilai's Brindanagar area (Ward no. 20).

== Filmography ==
Year	Film	Role	Notes
2024	Gauraiya Live	Rampal	
2024	Bengal 1947		
2023	Mission Raniganj	Bishu	
2023	Tumse Na Ho Payega	Birju Chaiwala	
2023	Jawan	Kalki's father	
2023	Bheed		
2022	Bhulan the Maze		
2022	Srinagar		
2021	Sweeper: Service to Humanity	Peon	
2021	Three Sisters and A Dream		
2021	Aao Khelein Gilli Danda		
2021	Safaibaaz - The Scavenger	Lalan	
2020	Pakshi	Shepherd	
2020	13 Tribute of Love	Amerika	
2020	Pyar Mein Thoda Twist	Dhaniram	
2019	The Wayfarers		
2019	Unda	Kunalchand	Malayalam film
2019	Chaturnath	Chaturnath	
2019	Albert Pinto Ko Gussa Kyun Aata Hai?	Village man	
2019	Hu Narendra Modi Banva Mangu Chu		
2018	Lakshksha	Lakshksha	Short film
2018	Task		
2018	Gaon	Shambhu	
2017	Phir Aaya Satte Pe Satta	Kalya	
2017	Taawdo the Sunlight	Ganglo Naai	
2017	Newton	Lakhma	
2015	India's Daughter		Documentary film
2015	Bumper Draw	Sunderlal	
2014	Pizza	Sadhu	
2014	Munna Mange Memsaab	Munna	
2013	Monsoon Shootout	Taxi driver	
2012	Aalaap		
2012	Qasam Se Qasam Se		
2012	Ab Hoga Dharna Unlimited		
2010	Peepli Live	Nathadas Manikpuri	
