= Pankaj Jha =

Indian actor and painter

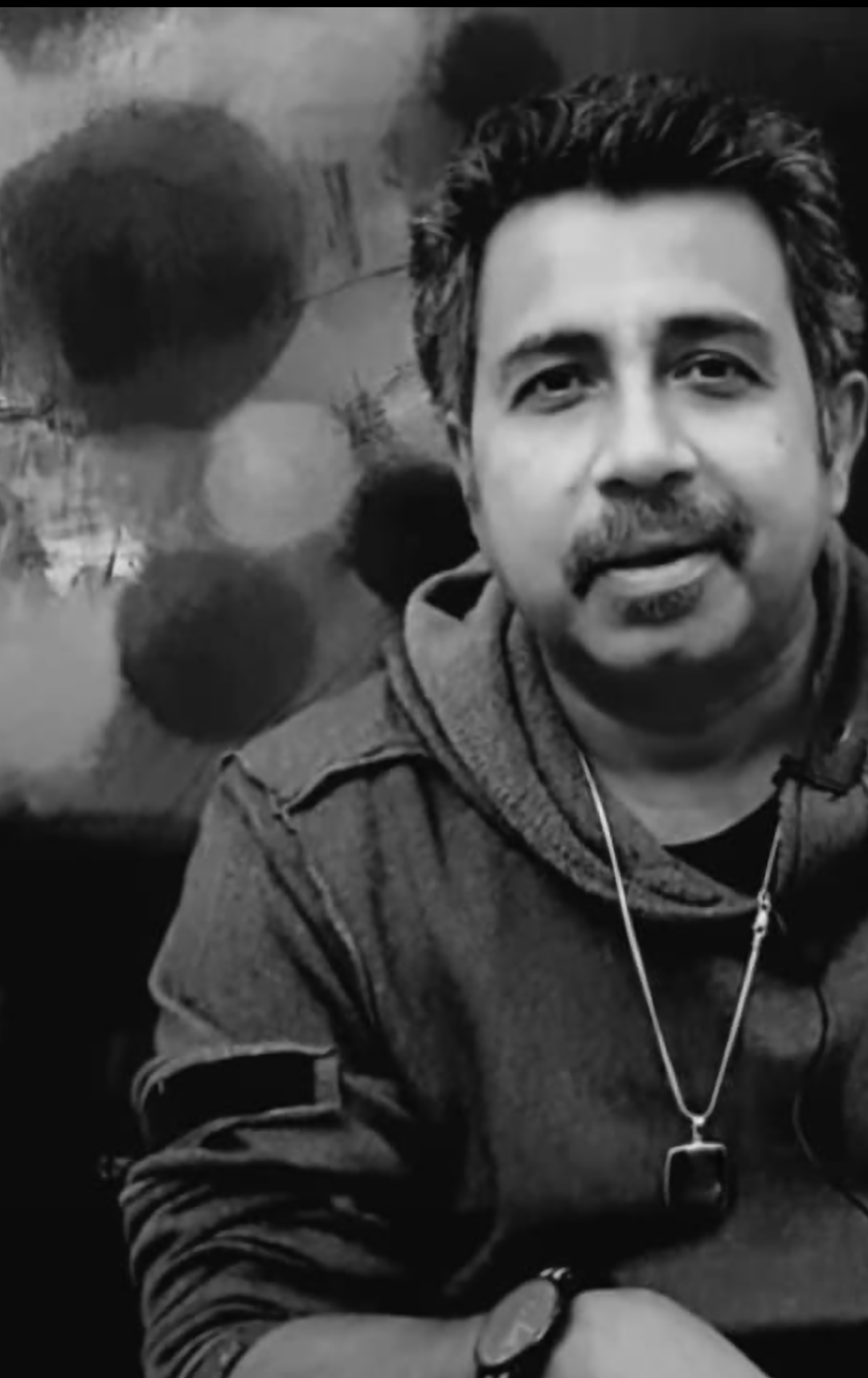
- 2023
- Born: 2 February 1970 (age 56); Saharsa, Bihar, India
- Occupations: Actor, Writer, Painter, Director
- Years active: 2001- Present
- Known for: Panchayat, Gulaal, Monsoon Wedding

Pankaj Jha (born 2 February 1970) is an Indian actor, painter, writer and director. His filmography includes Black Friday, 23rd March 1931: Shaheed, Gulaal, Chameli, Anwar and Matrubhoomi. He is known for his role as Vidhayak ji in Panchayat.

== Background ==
Jha studied acting at the National School of Drama (N.S.D) in Delhi. Upon finishing his training, he relocated to Mumbai to work in the film and television industry.

== Other work ==
Jha has held six solo painting exhibitions. He owns an art studio in Pune, Maharashtra.

== Filmography ==
=== Films ===
Year	Title	Role	Ref.
2001	Choo Lenge Akash		
2001	A Very Very Silent Film		
2001	Monsoon Wedding	Yadav	
2002	Company 23rd March 1931: Shaheed	Anees SukhdevRaj	
2003	Haasil	Naate	
2003	Matrubhoomi	Rakesh	
2005	Hazaaron Khwaishein Aisi		
2007	Black Friday	Anwar Theba	
2007	Anwar	Pandey	
2007	Aap Kaa Surroor	Ghulam Sayyed	
2009	Gulaal	Jadhwal	
2010	Teen Patti		
2015	Baankey Ki Crazy Baraat		
2017	Running Shaadi		
2019	Setters	Kesariya	
2019	Gun Pe Done		
2019	Blackboard vs Whiteboard	Mishri	
2019	Ferrous	Matin Khan	
2020	Mithila Makhaan	Brahmha	
2021	Atrangi Re	Rinki's Uncle	
2021	Mimi	Dilshad Ahmed	
2024	Gauraiya Live	Army Officer	

=== Television ===
Year	Show	Role	Ref.
2012-2013	2612	Mastana	
2013	SuperCops Vs Super Villains	Jogi	

== Web series ==
Year	Title	Role	Ref
2022	Nirmal Pathak Ki Ghar Wapsi	Makhanlal Pathak	
2022–present	Panchayat	MLA Chandrakishore "Chandu" Singh Vidhayak Ji	
2023	SSC	Khanna	
2018	Mirzapur Season 1	Gajjumal College Principal "Master saab"	
