= Plot Number 302 =

- Directed by: Vijay Suthar
- Written by: Vijay Suthar
- Produced by: Vijay Suthar; Vikram O Singh
- Cinematography: Raj Ashiwal
- Music by: D.J. Bharali
- Release date: 7 February 2025
- Running time: 93 Minutes
- Country: India
- Language: Rajasthani

'Plot Number 302' is Indian Rajasthani film released on 7 February 2025. The film features Altaf Hussain, Alisha Soni, Seema Dinodiya and Anjali Sharma. It was written and directed by Vijay Suthar. The film was screened at Rajasthan International Film Festival in February 2025 and received two awards including Best Rajasthani Feature Film and Best Actor male for Altaf Hussain. For the first time in the history of Cinema of Rajasthan, a film has been made in bagri dialect and has been screened in Mumbai and Bengaluru for the first time.

== Plot ==
Shiksha, a young girl, is found hanging, and her postmortem reveals she was HIV positive and a victim of murder. Judged unfairly by society and labeled characterless without understanding her condition, she silently endured immense struggles. Now, it is up to the police to uncover the truth and bring her killer to justice.

== Soundtrack ==
DJ Bharali composed Plot Number 302's soundtrack and the lyrics were written by Vijay Suthar. The vocals were performed by Mudasir Ali, Ankita Chauhan, Pallav Singh and Shivanya Singh.

== Cast ==
- Altaf Hussain
- Alisha Soni
- Seema Dinodiya
- Anjali Sharma
- Saubhagya Pratihar
- Ghanshyam Beniwal
- Abhishek Jangid
- Rudra Khatri
- Aishmita Meena
- Ramkesh Meena
- Deepak Kathuria
