= Mazhavillu =

- Directed by: Dinesh Baboo
- Written by: Dinesh Baboo
- Produced by: Cheriyan Paul; Xavi Manio Mathew
- Starring: Kunchacko Boban; Preeti Jhangiani; Vineeth; Lalu Alex
- Cinematography: Dinesh Baboo
- Edited by: B. S. Kemparaju
- Music by: Mohan Sitara
- Release date: 16 October 1999
- Country: India
- Language: Malayalam

Mazhavillu (transl. Rainbow) is a 1999 Indian Malayalam-language romantic thriller film directed by Dinesh Baboo. It is a remake of director's own 1997 Kannada movie Amruthavarshini. It stars Kunchacko Boban, Preeti Jhangiani and Vineeth in the lead roles, with Lalu Alex, Chithra, and Praveena in other pivotal roles.

== Plot ==
Mahesh and Veena are a happily married couple living in Germany (Duesseldorf and Frankfurt) with Mahesh working for an amusement park called Prater. One day, Vijay Krishnan, a poet and Mahesh's childhood friend, visits them. Vijay is depressed as his girlfriend Neena died due to cancer. Neena had made Vijay promise that he will marry another girl after her death. Vijay becomes obsessed with Veena as she has a strong resemblance with Neena. Mahesh learns of this but doesn't reveal this to Veena. Mahesh takes Vijay to a cliff and asks him to change his mind and go back home. Vijay tries to kill Mahesh who slips and dies falling from the cliff. Vijay does not try to save him even though he could have. Mahesh's automatic camera captures the whole episode. When Veena accidentally sees those pictures, she understands what really happened on that day. She pretends to have moved on and suggests that she is ready to share her life with Vijay. She asks him to take her to the cliff where Mahesh died as it was Mahesh's long-cherished dream to take photos from the cliff. She then confronts Vijay and commits suicide from that cliff, in front of Vijay, as revenge.

== Cast ==
- Vineeth as Vijay Krishnan
- Kunchacko Boban as Mahesh Menon
- Preeti Jhangiani as Veena Mahesh
- Lalu Alex as Varkeychan
- Chithra as Kathreena
- Praveena as Neena
- Kottayam Nazeer

== Music ==
The film features a composed score and soundtrack by Mohan Sitara. The lyrics were penned by Kaithapram Damodaran Namboothiri. The soundtrack of Mazhavillu especially the songs "Ponnolathumbil" and "Raavin Nilakkayal" were well received.

1. "Kilivathil" - K. S. Chithra
2. "Kilivathil" - K. J. Yesudas
3. "Ponnolathumbil" - K. S. Chithra, K. J. Yesudas
4. "Pulliman Kidave" - K. J. Yesudas, K.S.Chithra
5. "Pulliman Kidave" - Srinivas, K.S. Chithra
6. "Raavin Nilakkayal" - K. S. Chithra, K. J. Yesudas
7. "Sivadham" - K. S. Chithra, K. J. Yesudas
8. "Sivadham Version II" - K. S. Chithra, M. G. Sreekumar

== Reception ==
A critic rated the film 3/5 and wrote that "This movie is like Talented Mr. Ripley even though this came out before Talented Mr. Ripley". But the film ended up as a huge disaster in box office.
