= Four Pillars of Basement =

- फोर पिलर्स ऑफ बेसमेंट
- Directed by: Giresh Naik K
- Written by: Rajan Safri
- Produced by: Gautam Bafana; Pravin Chudasama
- Starring: Dilzan Wadia; Bruna Abdullah; Alia Singh; Shawar Ali; Zakir Hussain
- Cinematography: Arvind Singh Phunwar
- Edited by: Vinod Prajapati
- Music by: Mudasir Ali; Anurag Mohan
- Production companies: Kora Productions; Pravin Chudasama Films; Fair Deal Studios
- Release date: 6 November 2015
- Running time: 116 minutes
- Country: India
- Language: Hindi
- Box office: ₹0.15 crore

Four Pillars of Basement is a 2015 Indian Hindi psychological thriller film directed by Girish Naik and produced by Gautam Bafana & Pravin Chudasama. The film stars Dilzan Wadia, Bruna Abdullah, Alia Singh and Shawar Ali in leading roles and was released on 6 November 2015.

== Plot ==
On the night of Diwali, Riya (Aliya Singh) gets locked down in the basement of her office. She finds help in the form of Samir (Dilzan Wadia) who works as a security guard there, but soon comes to realize that Samir is not there to help her find a way out.

== Production ==
Fair Deal Studios is producing the film. Song performances were filmed in Goa with the lead actors of the film. "Rehamo Karam" is a song shot in Goa and over a schedule of 15 days. "Tu Hai Gazab Soniye", starring Dilzan and Bruna, was shot in Baroda at the Dynamite lounges. Another major shooting schedule of the film was held in Surat at Rahul Raj mall, Baroda at K10 mall. Dilzan Wadia will launch 11-year-old singer Jayalakshmi.

Four Pillars of Basement is written by Rajan Safri (US), directed by Giresh Naik K and produced by Gautam Bafana and Pravin Chudasama. Javed Ali and Mudassir Ali have sung songs for the film and music is composed by Anurag Mohn.

== Cast ==
- Dillzan wadia as Samir
- Bruna Abdullah as Bruna
- Aliya Singh as Riya
- Zakir Hussain as DSP
- Shawar Ali as Jiju
- Imran Khan as Bhai
- Anant Jao as Sir
- Ehasan Khan as Rodrigues
- Ravi Gadariya as Kal

== Soundtrack ==
Four Pillars of Basement

Soundtrack album by Mudasir Ali & Anurag Mohn
- Released: 12 August 2015
- Genre: Feature film soundtrack
- Length: 18:03
- Language: Hindi
- Label: Zee Music Company

The soundtrack of Four Pillars of Basement consists of four songs composed by Mudasir Ali and Anurag Mohn, the lyrics of which have been written by Avinash Jaiswar, Pratyush Prakash and Shailey Bidwaiker.

Tracklist
No.	Title	Lyrics	Music	Singer(s)	Length
1.	"Tu Hai Gazab Sohniye"	Avinash Jaiswar	Mudasir Ali	Brijesh Shandilya, Deepadhrita Poddar & DJ Czar	02:46
2.	"Udne Lagaa"	Pratyush Prakash	Anurag Mohn	Javed Ali	04:29
3.	"Rehmo Karem"	Shailey Bidwaiker	Mudasir Ali	Mudasir Ali & Shailey Bidwaiker	05:10
4.	"Rooh Yeh Qaid Hai"	Shailey Bidwaiker	Mudasir Ali	Mudasir Ali & Shailey Bidwaiker	05:44
Total length:					18:03

== Critical reception ==
Renuka Vyavahare of The Times of India gave the film a rating of 0.5 out of 5 and said that, "The film is a blatant scene-to-scene copy of Hollywood thriller P2 (2007). While the original film was mediocre itself, it seems remarkable compared to this one." Johnson Thomas of The Free Press Journal criticized the film saying that, "There’s little logic in the interplay and much less in the premeditated convolutions in the story telling that leads up to a suspect ending." Rajesh Kumar Singh of Bollywood Trade gave the film a rating of 0 out of 5 and said that, "The film seems to have been made to showcase the histrionic prowess of Dillzan Wadia who hams all the way to ignominy and ridicule. It’s an unimaginatively directed, written, photographed and edited film."
