= Mudasir Ali =

Indian composer

- Born: Mudasir Ali; Kashmir,
- Genres: Orchestral, Electronic, Soundtrack
- Occupation: Singer
- Instruments: Guitar, Piano, Vocals
- Years active: 2013–present
- Website: http://mudasir.net/

Mudasir Ali (born 21 November 1987) is an Indian composer. He debuted as a film composer in 2015 by composing songs and film score for the movie Bumper Draw. He later scored music for an action-thriller Four Pillars of Basement.

== Career ==
=== Original scores and songs ===
In 2014, Mudasir Ali rendered vocals for the title song of Girish Malik's Jal along with veteran Shubha Mudgal. The film was selected for the Panorama Selection of International Film Festival of India. His Indo Pak album Dil ki Udan Sarhad ke paar hai was launched by Mahesh Bhatt. He has also performed duets with Shubha Mudgal in a Bikram Ghosh project. He has recorded a song with Asha Bhosle for the film Lucknow Times.

== Discography ==
Year	Title	Director	Studio/Publisher/Producer	Notes
2013	Lucknow Times	Sudipto Sen	Blackk Stone Entertainment	Feature film
2015	Bumper Draw	Irshad Khan	Blackk Stone Entertainment	Feature film
2015	Dunno Y2... Life Is a Moment	Tonje Gjevjon and Sanjay Sharma,	Yuvraaj Parashar	Feature film
2015	Four Pillars of Basement	Gautam Bafana	Kora Productions	Feature film
2017	Taawdo The Sunlight	Vijay Suthar	D. Infotainment	Feature film
2019	The Pushkar Lodge	Vijay Suthar	Super Suthar Film Production	Feature Film
2025	Plot Number 302	Vijay Suthar	Super Suthar Film Production	Feature Film
2026	Offline	Vijay Suthar	Super Suthar Film Production	Feature Film
2026	Rukhsana		Mansi Jataniya, RJ Production, MJ Music Label	Music Video

== Awards ==
Mudasir Ali was nominated for 'Upcoming Music composer of the year' for his song in Lucknow Times at the San Francisco International Film Festival.
