= Raja Hasan =

Indian Playback Singer (born 1982)

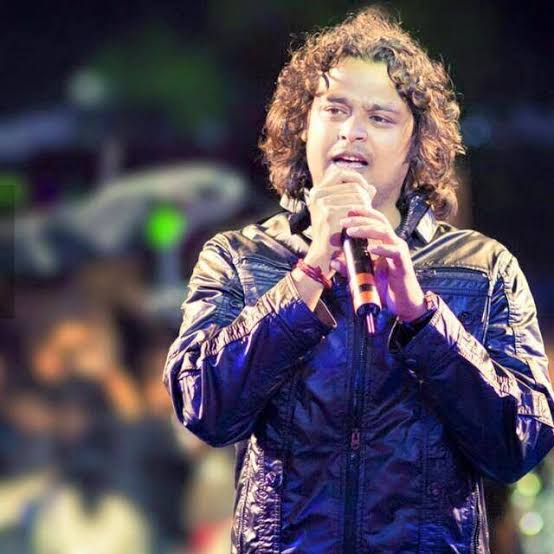

Background information
- Born: Raja Hasan Sagar; 25 December 1982 (age 43)
- Origin: Bikaner, Rajasthan, India
- Genres: Filmi, Indian classical music, sufi, bollywood
- Occupations: Entertainer, playback singer, sa re ga ma pa challenge 2007 finalist
- Instrument: Vocals
- Label: T-Series

Raja Hasan Sagar (born 25 December 1982) is an Indian playback singer from Bikaner, Rajasthan. He was a finalist on Sa Re Ga Ma Pa Challenge 2007, in which he finished as runner-up to Aneek Dhar. He was a judge in the singing competition show "Voice of Shekhawati". He has won multiple awards including, the Filmfare OTT Awards in 2024 and the 12th Mirchi Music Awards in 2020.

== Early career ==
Raja Hasan comes from the desert city of Bikaner, Rajasthan. He considers his father, Rafik Sagar (singer and music composer) and his grandfather Allah Rakha Khan as his gurus in singing.

Raja Hasan was a runner-up in the reality TV show Sa Re Ga Ma Pa Challenge 2007 and winner of Ek Se Badhkar Ek on Zee TV, Music Ka Maha Muqqabla on StarPlus, Ustaadon Ka Ustaad on Sony and, IPL Rockstar on the Colors channel. He also done guest appearances in many TV shows (fiction and non-fiction and reality shows). He and Arijit Singh Debuted Together in Aaja Nachle Song in High School Musical 2. His First Single Song was given by his Sa Re Ga Ma Pa Challenge 2007 Mentor Vishal–Shekhar in De Taali Song was Maari Teetri

== Playback singing ==
He has recorded many songs for Bollywood films.

- Heeramandi:"Sakal Ban"
- Mridang - An Unexpected Journey: "Title track" mridang baaje jab kismat ka
- Gurjar Aandolan: "Gurjar Aandolan sare aam karenge"
- Dostana:"Khabar Nahi"
- De Taali: "Maari Teetri"
- Jai Veeru: "Dhun Lagi" and "Agre Ka Ghagra"
- 99: "Delhi Destiny"
- Tees Maar Khan: "Wallah Re Wallah"
- Sadiyaan: "Sargoshiyo"
- No One Killed Jessica: "Aali Re"
- Well Done Abba: "Rahiman Ishq Ka Dhaga Re" and "Pani Ko Taraste"
- A Flat: "Chal Halke" and "Dil Kashi"
- Me Mamu and 7: "Billo Rani"
- Bachna Ae Haseeno: "Lucky Boy"
- MadhoLal-Keep Walking: "MadhoLal-Keep Walking"
- Chalo Dilli: "Chalo Dilli"
- Dreamz unlimited/Kaala khatta: "Maula"
- Ishq: "Chinnadana Neekosam"
- High School Musical 2: "Varri Varri"
- Shanghai: "Khuadaaya" and "Morcha"
- Teree Sang: "Tere Bin"
- Pyaar Ka Punchnama 2: "Sharabi"
- Shubh Mangal Savdhan: "Kankad"
- JD: "Naya Safar"
- Ram Ratan: "Nagada Nagada"
- Mitron: "Sanedo"
- Loveyatri: "Rangtaari" and "Dholida"
- Kanudo: "Thane Raat Din" and "Ghunghat me Na Chand"
- Kathor: "Antar Man Ki kalah"
- My friend ganesha 2: "Yaara Ruth Gaya"
- Bhuj: The Pride of India: "Zaalima Coca Cola"
- The Pushkar Lodge: "Padharo Rajasthan"
- Ebn-E-Batuta: Ishq Ka Sutta
- Time to Dance: Hathon Se Yoon
- Chahat Ya Nasha: Fanah Kar
- Jabariya Jodi:Jilla Hillela (2019)
- Mission Mangal: Tota Udd (2019)
- Vande Mataram Song (2019)
- Mere Angne Mein (2020)

=== Gujarati movies ===
- Satti Par Satto: Saathi and Bol Bilaadi Bol (2018)

=== Odia movies ===
- Daha Balunga
- Lekhi Chi Na Tara

=== Telugu movies ===
- Pula Rangadu
- Ishq
- Chinnadana Nee Kosam
- Loukyam
- Bhimavaram Bullodu

=== Malayalam movies ===
- The Goat Life

=== Bengali movies ===
- Buno Haansh

=== Rajasthani movies ===
- Vishesh

=== Bhojpuri movies ===
- "Mat Der Kara": Sajan Chale Sasural (2011 Film)
- EE Kaisan Bidaa: "E Kaisan Bidaai"

=== Album ===
- Yaar Mila De Re
- Mere Angne Mein
- Dil Janiya
- Gota Hi Gota
- Gallan Mahiya Diyan
- Deewana
- Hayo Rabba
- Welcome To Haryana Ji
- Khoto Sikko
- Banna Jad Chaale
- Tharo Bhai
- Raj Banna Sa
- Khoon Di Fitrat
- Holi Ka Rang
- Udta Teer
- Bewafa Hum Na The

== As actor ==
He played a side role in Rajma Chawal Movie. The character name Is Jacky Jam.

== As producer ==
He produced his first Rajasthani film Marudhar Mharo Ghar; also he acted in the movie as a lead.

== Accolades ==
Year	Award Ceremony	Category	Film/Series	Song	Result	Reference(s)
2009.	Mirchi Music Awards	Upcoming Male Vocalist of The Year	Jai Veeru	"Dhun Lagi"	Won	
2011	Guinness World Records	Largest Helium Essemble	Colors TV Show		Won	
2015	Rajasthan International Film Festival	Best Debut Actor	Marudhar Mharo Ghar		Won	
2015	Rajasthan International Film Festival	Best Singer	Marudhar Mharo Ghar		Won	
2016	KAF Business and Entertainment Awards	Best Singer			Won	
2018	Indian Television Academy Awards	Face Of The Year			Won	
2018	Cinema AajTak	Best Playback Singer	Loveyatri	"Dholida"	Won	
2020	12th Mirchi Music Awards	Best Raag Inspired Song Of The Year	Yeh Hai India	"Dhola"	Won	
2024	Asia Contents Awards & Global OTT Awards	Best Original Song	Heeramandi: The Diamond Bazaar	"Sakal Ban"	Nominated	
2024	Filmfare OTT Awards	Best Original Sound Track	Heeramandi: The Diamond Bazaar	"Sakal Ban"	Won	
