= Qasam Se Qasam Se =

Qasam Se Qasam Se is a 2012 Indian Hindi language romance film. The movie was directed by Ashfaq Makrani, starring Faith Mehra, Farhan and Satish Kaushik. The film is a love story between Rohan (Azim Rizvi) and Faith (Faith Mehra). The film is set in a college.

== Cast ==
- Faith Mehra as Faith
- Farhan
- Satish Kaushik
- Sandeep Kochar as Professor Tripati
- Omkar Das Manikpuri
- Azim Rizvi as Rohan
- Akbar Sami
- Rakhi Sawant as Delnaz Doodhwala
- Latesh Sharma as Vicky
- Mukesh Tiwari

== Soundtrack ==
- Bolne Main Kya Jaata - Mika Singh, Shailendra Kumar
- Har Varak - Shaan
- Mumkin Nahi - Kunal Ganjawala, Monali Thakur
- Rokade Ki Maya - Neeraj Shridhar
- Tujhe Paya To - Mohit Chauhan
- Tum Kaha Ho - KK
- Zindagi Kah Rahi Hai - Mohit Chauhan
