= Chand Ke Paar Chalo (film) =

- Directed by: Mustafa Engineer
- Written by: Khawar Jalees
- Produced by: Babar Chopra
- Starring: Sahib Chopra; Preeti Jhangiani; Sanjay Narvekar; Shakti Kapoor; Himani Shivpuri; Alok Nath; Sanjay Narvekar; Razzak Khan; Kannu Gill; Tej Sapru
- Music by: Saregama
- Production company: Creative channel
- Release date: 31 March 2006
- Country: India
- Language: Hindi

Chaand Ke Paar Chalo (lit. 'Go to the other side of the Moon') is a 2006 Bollywood film directed by Mustafa Engineer released in 2006. This was Engineer's first film.

== Synopsis ==
The main protagonist is Chander, a tourist photographer in the Indian city of Nainital living with his parents and best friend Johnny. While on his way to work, he meets a stage dancer (a banjaran) named Nirmala [played by Preeti Jhangiani] and is seduced by her beauty. He takes photographs of her and later befriends her, serenading her with sweet nothings about "taking her across the moon and stars" and promising to take her to the city of dreams, Mumbai. She agrees to be with him, despite objections from her guardians, her uncle, and her aunt, who had other plans for her. From there, her career as a star begins under a new name, Garima.

Chander sells his camera to Johnny as well as his studio to raise money for the realization of their dreams. A film director named Arman Khan discovers Garima and gives her the lead role in his film. Garima attains fame and wealth and eventually starts to cold-shoulder Chander. Her assistant Kapoor dislikes Chander and plots to get rid of him. He succeeds in getting Chander thrown out of Garima's house. Chander's friend advises him to return to Nainital. Upon his return, Chander learns that his father has died and that his mother is staying with his old friend Johnny. Johnny advises Chander to start fresh and returns his camera. Chander returns to his old job. Eventually, he runs into Garima and pleads with her to take him back. She eventually agrees, and they get back together.

== Cast ==
- Sahib Chopra as Chander
- Preeti Jhangiani as Nirmala a.k.a. Garima
- Shakti Kapoor as Kapoor
- Himani Shivpuri as Nirmala's aunt
- Alok Nath as Chander's father
- Sanjay Narvekar as Johny
- Razzak Khan as Mulla
- Kannu Gill as Chander's mother
- Tej Sapru as Nirmala's uncle
- Raja Awasthi as Pandit
- Upasna Singh as Lag
- Navin Bawa as Deepak
- Yusuf Hussain as Armaan Khan

== Soundtrack ==
Chand Ke Paar Chalo

Soundtrack album by Vishnu Narayan
- Released: 2006
- Genre: Feature film soundtrack
- Length: 37:26
- Language: Hindi
- Label: Saregama
- Director: Mustafa Engineer
- Producer: Babbar Chopra

Vishnu Narayan chronology
Love U Family	Chand Ke Paar Chalo

The music of the film is composed Vishnu Narayan & Lyrics penned by Rishi Azad. The soundtrack was released 2006 Saregama Music by which consists of 8 songs.

The full album is recorded by Kumar Sanu, Udit Narayan, Alka Yagnik, Shreya Ghosal, Jaspinder Narula, Kalpana, Karsan Sagathia & Aftab Hasmi Sabri

#	Title	Singer(s)	#	Lyrics By	Duration
1	"Chand Ke Paar Chalo"	Udit Narayan, Alka Yagnik		Rishi Azad	5min 320sec
2	"Kinna Sona Pal"	Jaspinder Narula		Rishi Azad	6min 22Sec
3	"Dhin Chak Lad Gayee"	Kalpana Patowary, Karan Sagathia		Rishi Azad	05min 07sec
4	"Deewana Pooch Lega"	Udit Narayan		Rishi Azad	05min 10sec
5	"Chand Ke Paar Chalo Part 2"	Udit Narayan, Alka Yagnik		Rishi Azad	01min 19sec
6	"Chand Ke Paar Chalo (sad)"	Udit Narayan, Alka Yagnik		Rishi Azad	02min 13sec
7	"Is Dil Ka Bharosha Kya"	Aftab Hasmi Sabri, Kumar Sanu, Shreya Ghoshal		Rishi Azad	07min 19sec
8	"Dhin Chak Lad Gayee"	Kalpna Potawary, Karan Sagathia		Rishi Azad	04min 42sec
