= Bumper Draw =

- Theatrical release poster
- Directed by: Irshad Khan
- Written by: Rashid Khan
- Starring: Rajpal Yadav; Omkar Das Manikpuri; Zakir Hussain; Rushad Rana
- Cinematography: S. Kannan
- Edited by: Rohit Dhiman
- Music by: Rahul Mishra
- Production companies: Blackk Stone Entertainment; Black Pearl Movies Pvt. Ltd.
- Release date: 16 October 2015
- Country: India
- Language: Hindi

Bumper Draw ( Hindi: बंपर ड्रा ) is a Bollywood Hindi comedy film starring Rajpal Yadav, Omkar Das Manikpuri (Natha), Zakir Hussain and Rushad Rana. Directed & produced by Irshad Khan Co. and produced by Dinesh Kumar, the film was released to cinemas on 16 October 2015.

== Synopsis ==
Bumper Draw is a hilarious film about two characters – Sunderlal & Farooq who befriend each other in a strange situation. After which, they both encounter Pestonji, an old Parsi man who adds to their existing list of problems. However at the end, Pestonji is the one who turns out to be a reward for both of them.

== Marketing and promotion ==
Director-producer Irshad Khan threw a party to celebrate the completion of his upcoming Hindi comedy movie Bumper Draw. The entire team was present to be a part of this celebration. Leading actors Rajpal Yadav, Rajesh Desai, Narendra Bedi, Singer Mudasir Ali and Co-producer Reshma Khan were seen at this do. Irshad Khan's close friends actor Irrfan Khan and filmmaker Tigmanshu Dhulia joined the celebrations held at Levo Lounge, Andheri.

After this completion party, the team launched the first look of the film at Wilson College's annual fest Adorea 2015 on 23 August. Bumper Draw is scheduled to release on 16 October.

The trailer of the movie was launched amidst much fanfare at Carnival Cinemas in Andheri on 14 Sep. 2015. The film's lead actors were Rajpal Yadav, Zakir Hussain, Rina Charinya, T.P. Aggarwal, Raj Patel, Reshma Khan and Dinesh Kumar among others.

== Cast ==
- Rajpal Yadav As Farooq
- Zakir Hussain as Gali Babba
- Subrat Dutta as Villium
- Rushad Rana as Nariman
- Bomi Dotiwala as Pestonjee
- Omkar Das Manikpuri as Sunderlal
- Meera as Item Song Girl
- Seema Azami as Komal Bai
- Abhishek Ingale as Rafiq
- Deepa Sethi as Priya
- Reena Charnya as Sharmila
- Narendra Bedi as Dr. Y I M Bedi
- Harish Kumaar as Haricharan
- Sitaram Panchal as Vaman Bhalerao
- Hrishikesh Joshi as Inspector Parab

== Soundtrack ==
The soundtrack for the movie was composed by Rahul Mishra and the lyrics were penned by Irshad Khan.

No.	Title	Singer(s)	Length
1.	"Lukkhe Bade Aate Hain"	Mohammed Irfan	3:18
2.	"Jod Jod"	Mamta Sharma & Altamash Faridi	3:41
3.	"Khamakhan"	Mudasir Ali	4:48
Total length:			11:47

== Sequel ==
A sequel of the film titled Phir Se Bumper draw’ was announced on 26 July 2024 with the shoot beginning on 20 September 2024 in Mumbai and Dubai.
