= Waah! Tera Kya Kehna =

Waah..! Tera Kya Kehna
- Directed by: Manoj Agrawal
- Written by: Anwar Khan (dialogues)
- Screenplay by: Rajeev Kaul; Praful Parekh
- Produced by: Sibte Hasan Rizvi
- Starring: Govinda; Raveena Tandon; Preeti Jhangiani
- Cinematography: Peter Pereira
- Edited by: R. Rajendran
- Music by: Jatin–Lalit
- Production companies: Asia Vision Entertainment; New World Enterprises
- Release date: 1 November 2002
- Running time: 142 minutes
- Country: India
- Language: Hindi
- Box office: ₹ 2.69 cr.

Waah! Tera Kya Kehna (English: Wow! You're Amazing) is a 2002 Indian Hindi-language comedy film directed by Manoj Agrawal starring Govinda and Raveena Tandon.

== Plot ==
Krishna Oberoi, a distinguished businessman, has two sons, Dilip and Ashish, who he suspects are primarily interested in his wealth. He prefers his devoted grandson, Raj, whom he plans to entrust with his estate. Raj, deeply loved by Krishna, is also enamored with Meena. Their relationship culminates in an engagement, but a tragic accident leaves Raj with brain damage, exhibiting childlike behavior, and ultimately leading to the engagement being called off.

Amidst these troubles, a conspiracy by Dilip's son Vikram forces Raj to separate from his grandfather, taking refuge with Murari. Heartbroken by Meena’s decision not to visit him, Raj disappears into a sandstorm. During this chaos, Dilip, Ashish, Vikram, and their accomplice Charles orchestrate Krishna’s murder, drugging him and then throwing him from a building.

In a twist of fate, Murari encounters Banne Khan, a striking doppelganger of Raj, along with his wife, Salma Khan, and their assistant. Murari convinces Banne to impersonate Raj to claim his inheritance and exact revenge. As Banne steps into his role, the real Raj unexpectedly returns; the two lookalikes confront and defeat Raj's uncles and Charles, restoring justice and order to their lives.

== Cast ==
- Govinda as Raj Oberoi / Inspector Banne Khan
- Raveena Tandon as Inspector Salma Khan
- Preeti Jhangiani as Meena
- Shammi Kapoor as Krishna Oberoi
- Kader Khan as Murari
- Shakti Kapoor as Dilip Oberoi
- Mohnish Bahl as Vikram “Vicky” Oberoi
- Ashish Vidyarthi as Charles
- Rana Jung Bahadur as Ashish Oberoi
- Navneet Nishan as Anju Oberoi
- Supriya Karnik as Madhu Oberoi
- Tej Sapru as Lawyer Anand Verma
- Rajat Bedi as Arshad, Meena's brother
- Rakesh Bedi as Kaushik, Murari's neighbour
- Anil Dhawan as Naresh, Meena's father
- Anju Mahendru as Anita, Meena's mother
- Viju Khote as Damodar, Manager of Raj Oberoi
- Raju Srivastava as Ahmed, Banne Khan's assistant
- Razzak Khan as Goon Godbole
- Rakhi Sawant as Dancer

== Soundtrack ==
Music composed by Jatin-Lalit.

#	Title	Singer(s)
1	"Waah Tera Kya Kehna"	Roop Kumar Rathod, Kavita Krishnamurthy
2	"I Want Money"	Govinda, Shweta Pandit
3	"Karele Ki Shaadi"	Abhijeet
4	"Yeh Mujhe Kya Hua"	Udit Narayan, Alka Yagnik
5	"Hallo Hallo"	Sudesh Bhosle, Anuradha Sriram
6	"Mujhe Teri Nazar"	Udit Narayan, Alka Yagnik

== Awards and nominations ==
- Nominated – Zee Cine Award for Best Actor in a Comic Role - Govinda
