= Gauraiya Live =

- Theatrical release poster
- Directed by: Gabriel Vats
- Screenplay by: Gabriel Vats; Seema Saini
- Story by: Gabriel Vats
- Produced by: Rahul Rangare; Nishant Jain; Rohit Raj Singh Chouhan; Rajeev Jain
- Starring: Ada Singh; Omkar Das Manikpuri; Pankaj Jha; Narendra Khatri; Shagufta Ali; Seema Saini; Vinay Jha
- Cinematography: Mahesh Sarojini Rajan
- Edited by: Som Chavan
- Music by: Sunjoy Bose; Seema Saini
- Production companies: Rare films; Tea and poetry films
- Distributed by: Mysticat Films
- Release date: 12 April 2024
- Country: India
- Language: Hindi

Gauraiya Live is a 2024 Hindi-language drama film directed by Gabriel Vats and produced by Rahul Rangare, Dr. Nishant Jain, Rohit Raj Singh Chouhan and Rajeev Jain under the banner of Rare Films and Tea and Poetry Films. The film stars Ada Singh, Omkar Das Manikpuri, Pankaj Jha. It is based on true events and is set against the backdrop of Bhopal.

== Synopsis ==
A tragic twist of fate, as Gauraiya falls into a borewell, intertwines her story with that of her parents. They had their hopes and aspirations shattered, but found solace in Gauraiya's unwavering spirit.

== Cast ==
- Ada Singh as Gauraiya
- Omkar Das Manikpuri as Rampal
- Shagufta Ali as Dukari
- Seema Saini as Phoolwati
- Pankaj Jha as Army Officer
- Narendra Khatri as Devnaryan
- Ganesh Singham as Shiv
- Balram Ojha as Sarju
- Alok Chatterji as Builder
- Vinay Jha as Amit

== Music ==
Seema Saini is the lyricist and background score is composed by Sunjoy Bose, Shashi Mekal and Sekhar Bagchi.
