= Bikkar Bai Sentimental =

2013 film

- Directed by: Gautam Anil Nagrath
- Screenplay by: Bobby Sandhu and Baljinder S Mahant
- Story by: Baljinder S Mahant
- Produced by: Sandeep Bansal and Kamaljit Kaur
- Starring: Jassi Jasraj, Preeti Jhangiani, Shahbaz Khan, Sardar Sohi and Bobby Sandhu
- Cinematography: Pankaj Kachhawa
- Edited by: Prashant Singh Rathore
- Music by: JSL Singh
- Release date: 19 April 2013
- Country: India
- Language: Punjabi

Bikkar Bai Sentimental is a 2013 Indian Punjabi-language action film directed by Gautam Anil Nagrath. It centers on the character of Jassi Jasraj (Karan Jasbir), a singer and music composer, who is better known for his rebellious attitude. The film is directed by Gautam Anil Nagrath. It was produced by Sandeep Bansal and Kamaljit Kaur. Screenplay and dialogues of the movie were written by Bobby Sandhu & Bajinder S Mahant.

== Cast ==
- Jassi Jasraj Longia
- Preeti Jhangiani
- Ritika Singh
- Shahbaz Khan
- Rana Ranbir
- Diljit Dosanjh
- Baljinder Darapuri
- Kawalpreet Singh
- Bobby Sandhu
