= Munna Mange Memsaab =

- Theatrical release poster
- Directed by: Shareeph Mansuri Saranawala
- Written by: Shareeph Mansuri Saranawala; Andaaz Khan
- Produced by: Ajay Gupta; Jayshree Bothra
- Starring: Omkar Das Manikpuri, Razzak Khan Jordiya Anna; Himani Shivpuri
- Cinematography: Gopal Dey
- Edited by: Pramod Mourya
- Music by: Nizam Khan
- Production company: Vinay Arts
- Distributed by: Manoj Nandwana (Jai Viratra Entertainment Limited)
- Release date: 11 July 2014
- Country: India
- Language: Hindi

Munna Mange Memsaab (Hindi: मुन्ना मांगे मेमसाब) is a 2014 Hindi movie. The film stars Omkar Das Manikpuri of Peepli Live fame amongst others.

== Cast ==
- Omkar Das Manikpuri as Munna
- Razak Khan
- Jordiya Anna
- Himani Shivpuri
- Mushtak Khan
- Chandu Nangaliya

== Production ==
Munna Mange Memsaab has been in the making for some time now. This film is directed by Shareeph Mansuri Saranawala while Ajay Gupta and Jayshree Bothra are the producers. The film will be distributed by Jai Viratra Entertainment Limited.
