= Deana Uppal =

English actress, business woman and director

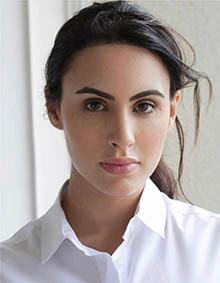
- Uppal in 2018
- Born: Deana Kaur Uppal; 30 January 1989 (age 37); Middlesbrough, England
- Occupations: Filmmaker, Philanthropist and Entrepreneur
- Height: 1.74
- Beauty pageant titleholder
- Hair color: Brown
- Eye color: Brown
- Major competition: Point Of Light award - from PM of UK Rishi Sunak

Deana Kaur Uppal (born 30 January 1989) is an English beauty pageant titleholder, actress and business entrepreneur. She was the winner of Miss India UK 2012. She was also one of the housemates in the Big Brother (British series 13), one of the contestants in Fear Factor, Khatron ke Khiladi 5, and has featured in various movies.

== Personal life ==
Uppal was born in Middlesbrough. Her father died from cancer when she was a child, and she moved to the Midlands when she was 12. Uppal currently lives between London and India.

== Big Brother 13 ==
Uppal participated in Big Brother 13 in 2012.

On Day 1, Uppal entered the house along with fifteen other housemates. She was randomly selected by Big Brother to be the first housemate to enter the house, and had to nominate three of the other housemates in front of her in exchange for immunity from the public eviction. On Day 70, Uppal left the house in third place. She received the most nominations of the entire series and survived the highest number of evictions.

== Filmography ==
Year	Film	Role	Source
2011	Billo Nach	Model	Music Video
2024	Love Guru	Producer	Movie
2012	Born to Be King	Sheeba	
2016	Yeh Hai India	Jenny	
2016	Sardaarji	Casting Director	
2017	Main Kosa Rabb Nu	Director	
2017	Parking	Meera	
2017	Taste of Asia	Herself	
2017	Hard Kaur	Sirat Kaur	
2018	Curly Curly Vaal	Director	Music Video
2018	Levelz	Assistant Director	Music Video
2020	India's nomads: The forgotten world of the Gadia Lohar	Director and Host	Documentary
2021	Jind Mahi	Executive Producer	Film
2022	Sidhus Of Southall	Executive Producer	Film
