= Taawdo the Sunlight =

2017 Indian film directed by Vijay Suthar

Taawdo The Sunlight
- Directed by: Vijay Suthar
- Written by: Vijay Suthar
- Starring: Preeti Jhangiani; Omkar Das Manikpuri; Santosh Saini; Pradeep Kabra; Sachin Choudhary; Vijay Suthar
- Cinematography: Pappu K. Shetty
- Music by: Lalit Pandit; D.J. Bharali
- Release date: 31 March 2017
- Running time: 98 mins
- Country: India
- Language: Rajasthani

Taawdo the Sunlight is an Indian Rajasthani film released on 31 March 2017. The film features Preeti Jhangiani, Pradeep Kabra, Omkar Das Manikpuri and Sachin Choudhary and was written and directed by Vijay Suthar.

The film was screened at Rajasthan International Film Festival in January 2017 and received three awards including Best Actress for Preeti Jhangiani and Best Music for Lalit Pandit. It was also screened at Masala Chawk in association with JDA and RIFF Club on 15 July 2018.

== Plot ==
After two children belonging to an Indian upper caste are lost in the desert, a lower caste woman spots them. However, she is torn between a mother's heart that aches to save the children and norms of the society that forbid her to form any relationship with the upper caste.

== Cast ==
- Preeti Jhangiani
- Pradeep Kabra
- Satyendra Singh Naruka
- Omkar Das Manikpuri
- Sachin Choudhary
- Taifur Gujrati
- Shilpa Kularia
- Vijay Suthar
- Santosh Saini

== Soundtrack ==
Song	Singers	Music director
Taawdo Title Song	Divya Kumar	Lalit Pandit
Aaya Paachha	Shaan (singer)	Lalit Pandit
Thode Kasht	Lalit Pandit	Lalit Pandit
Khel Khel	Pragya Sodhani, Smita Bhatkar	Lalit Pandit
Jhar Jhar Barse	Mudasir Ali	D. J. Bharali
