= Setters (film) =

2019 Indian Hindi-language crime thriller film

- Theatrical release poster
- Directed by: Ashwini Chaudhary
- Written by: Siraj Ahmed
- Story by: Vikash Mani; Ashwini Chaudhary
- Produced by: Vikash Mani
- Starring: Aftab Shivdasani; Shreyas Talpade; Sonnalli Seygall; Vijay Raaz; Ishita Dutta; Pavan Malhotra; Jameel Khan; Pankaj Jha
- Cinematography: Santosh Thundiyil
- Edited by: Manik Dawar
- Music by: Songs: Enbee; Salim–Sulaiman; Background score: John Stewart Eduri
- Production companies: Lovely Films Production House (P) Ltd.; NH Studioz LLP
- Distributed by: NH Studioz
- Release date: 3 May 2019
- Running time: 126 minutes
- Country: India
- Language: Hindi
- Box office: ₹58 lakh

Setters is a 2019 Indian Hindi-language crime thriller film directed by Ashwini Chaudhary and produced by Vikash Mani. Based on the examination of cheating rackets present in India, the film stars Aftab Shivdasani, Shreyas Talpade, Sonnalli Seygall, Vijay Raaz, Ishita Dutta, Pavan Malhotra, Jameel Khan and Pankaj Jha. The film is about an eponymous racket which arranges brilliant student in place of weak student to appear in examination for money.

Principal photography began on 10 October 2018 and was held at various locations in New Delhi, Varanasi, Jaipur and Mumbai. Set in Banaras, Jaipur, Mumbai and Delhi, the film was released on 3 May 2019.

== Plot ==
Apurva Chaudhary is the head of an examination cheating racket "Setters", which specializes in conning the examination, which includes banking, medical and engineering entrance exams. They leak the papers using their extensive network, also providing proxy candidates and latest technology-based cheating. The team makes profit worth crores from students who have paid money. Apurva is controlled by Bhaiyyaji, who manages the trade from Varanasi.

To find a solution, a special police taskforce headed by Inspector Aditya Singh is set up. Aditya is one of Apurva's former best friends, and they are now on opposite sides of the law. The team tries everything, but Apurva and gang come up with new ideas every time. After he successfully cons the banking examination for one in Mumbai, Bhaiyyaji gives him the next task of engineering examination. But the cops are close, and they arrest three members of Apurva's gang. They do not reveal anything under torture.

Apurva asks Bhaiyyaji for help, but he now wants to join a party and, in line with his political aspirations, he doesn't help them. Apurva and Bhaiyyaji hence clash and they set up individual operations now. Aditya is almost on the verge of catching Apurva red-handed, but his plan is again foiled as Apurva and gang, along with Bhaiyyaji's daughter Prerana, who loves Apurva, are shown going to the other end of the India–Nepal border masquerading as police officers.

== Cast ==
- Aftab Shivdasani as Inspector Aditya Singh
- Shreyas Talpade as Apurva Chaudhary
- Sonnalli Seygall as Isha
- Vijay Raaz as Nizam
- Pavan Malhotra as Bhaiyyaji
- Zeishan Quadri as Nihal
- Sharat Saxena as Salim Bhai
- Mahesh Manjrekar as Choudhry Ji
- Ishita Dutta as Prerana, Bhaiya Ji's daughter
- Jameel Khan as Ansari
- Neeraj Sood as Bhanu
- Pankaj Jha as Kesariya
- Venus Singh as Aarushi
- Manu Rishi as Balam
- Anil Mange as Dibakar
- Diksha Singh as Divya Singh, Aditya's wife
- Umesh Bhatia as Bank Manager

== Soundtrack ==
Setters

Soundtrack album by Salim–Sulaiman and Enbee
- Recorded: 2018
- Genre: Feature film soundtrack
- Label: Zee Music Company

Salim–Sulaiman chronology
| 102 Not Out (2018) | Setters (2019) |

The film's soundtrack is composed by Salim–Sulaiman and Enbee while the lyrics are written by Dr. Sagar, Raftaar and Enbee.

Track listing
| No. | Title | Lyrics | Singer(s) | Length |
|---|---|---|---|---|
| 1. | "Kartootein" | Dr. Sagar, Raftaar | Sukhwinder Singh, Raftaar | 4:26 |
| 2. | "Boom Jawani" (music by Enbee) | Enbee | Raahi, Enbee | 2:35 |

== Release ==
The film was released on 3 May 2019.

== Reception ==
=== Box office ===
Setters has earned ₹58 lakh in India.

== See also ==
- Vyapam scam
