= Mini Studio =

Lebanese children's television program

- Genre: Children Entertainment
- Created by: Ghazy Feghaly
- Creative director: Ghazy Feghaly
- Presented by: Marie Christine Naim (Kikky), Youmna Chamcham, Reem Naoum
- Theme music composer: Ghazy Feghaly, Kamal Saikaly
- Country of origin: Lebanon
- Original languages: French, English, Arabic
- No. of seasons: 25
- No. of episodes: Daily

Production
- Executive producer: Marie-Christine Naim
- Producers: Ghazy Feghaly, Marie-Christine Naim
- Production location: Lebanon
- Running time: Daily at 4 pm on MTV
- Production company: La Grande Famille

Original release
- Network: Murr Television
- Release: November 9, 1992 – 2016

Mini Studio is a Lebanese TV show for kids and preteens in the Middle East and North Africa. It was created by Ghazy Feghaly and first aired in 1992 on MTV. The show celebrated its 25th anniversary of being on air in 2016. The show has 350 original characters, and contains multilingual songs in the languages of French, English and Arabic. The show has created and had theatrical plays, tours, concerts, albums, DVDs, products and merchandise.

Logo of Mini Studio

== Notable characters & songs ==
Kikky (Marie-Christine Naim) is the show's lead since its beginning. She is often compared to Chantal Goya, or Dorothee. She is accompanied by many characters including Glagla Le Clown, Woonie Le Marin, Sucette, Papouf, Mamouf, Patitoupata, Fanfan L'Elephant, and the show's original witch Ambrosia plus her crow Cornefer. All character names and songs were conceived and composed by Ghazy Feghaly. He drew inspiration from his niece's Youmna Chamcham imaginary friends. They wrote many of the songs while playing together at home. Monsieur Le Livre, once Youmna's lullaby, is now a song taught in nurseries and schools. Mini Studio was the first show to ever record the Alphabet song in Arabic in 1996. Once per year the show releases a new album and a Holiday special for Christmas & Easter.

== Musical theater ==
Once per year, Mini Studio produced one original Musical Theater bridging their TV characters and storylines to make fantasy worlds come to life onstage. They attracted audiences of 60,000 a year. Ghazy Feghaly wrote and directed a total of 22 original plays. Most of the content was originally in French. English and Arabic began to be introduced in 2000, when the show started being broadcast through satellite TV and the internet.

- A la recherche de l'étoile perdue (1992)
- Voyage au pays d'Amareddine (1993)
- La légende du fantôme prisonnier (1995)
- Le secret de Chiffon La Poupée (1996)
- Pierrot au pays des chansons (1997)
- Les pirates de l'île aux bonbons (1998)
- Kikky et le Père Noël (1999)
- Oursoudoux City (1999)
- Cartoon Town (2000)
- Happy Birthday Lou (2001)
- Christmas Wonderland (2002)
- Summer Camp (2002)
- It's Christmas (2003)
- Le secret de Chiffon La Poupée (2003)
- Mini Studio Forever (2003)
- Bonjour l'école (2005)
- Easter in Bonny Bunny Land (2008)
- L'étoile de Fifi (2008)
- Les Aventures de Peter Cottontail (2009)
- Hey! Ambrosia it's Christmas (2009)
- J'ai perdu le Do (2010)
- Hikayat Amareddine (2011)

== Album releases ==
Since 1995, Mini Studio issued one album per year. The albums were sold at the musical theater performances, while on tour, as well as at Virgin Megastore.
