= Yeh Hai India =

2019 Indian Hindi-language drama film

- Directed by: Lom Harsh
- Written by: Lom Harsh
- Produced by: Sandeep Choudhary; Abhinav Jain
- Starring: Gavie Chahal; Deana Uppal
- Cinematography: Balaji V. Rangha
- Edited by: Vinay Pal
- Music by: Raja Hassan
- Production company: DLB Films Pvt. Ltd.
- Release dates: August 2017 (FOG Film Festival); 24 May 2019
- Country: India
- Languages: Hindi; English

Yeh Hai India (transl. This is India) is a 2017 Indian Hindi-language drama film written and directed by Lomharsh. Produced by Sandeep Choudhary under the banner of DLB Films Pvt. Ltd. The film is based on its writer's real life journey to several countries and his observations on the thoughts and views of other people about India. It features Gavie Chahal, Deana Uppal in the lead roles. Music by Raja Hassan.

== Plot ==
Yeh Hai India, follows the story of a 25-year-old NRI, who is born and raised in United Kingdom and shares the same stereotype views of India, which is known for its vast population, pollution and poverty. However, protagonist finds new development in media or probably an "other side of same coin" of India, which is also known for successful mars mission in first attempt, a nation which proudly holds title "God of Cricket" for Sachin Tendulkar, who is again an Indian and a nation which is known for its holy generosity with icons like Mother Teresa". The film was shot in Rajasthan, Bihar, Mumbai, Uttar Pradesh, Madhya Pradesh and Gujarat. The official motion poster of Yeh Hai India released in Jaipur.

== Cast ==
- Gavie Chahal as NRI
- Deana Uppal as British Girl
- Mohan Agashe as PM
- Mohan Joshi as Tourism Minister
- Surendra Pal
- Ashutosh Kaushik
- Antara Banerjee
- Bikramjeet Kanwarpal
- karmveer Choudhary as Darshan Singh

== Soundtrack ==
The title track video song voiced by Shahid Mallya was released online on April 30, 2019. The mp3 album of the film was unveiled on April 30, 2019 which consists of 5 songs.

=== Track listing ===
No.	Title	Lyrics	Singer(s)	Length
1.	"Title Track"	Tapesh R Panwar	Shahid Mallya	4:46
2.	"Saiyan"	Manthan	Javed Ali	3:43
3.	"Piya Bin (Male)"	Tapesh R Panwar	Javed Ali	6:01
4.	"Piya Bin (Female)"	Tapesh R Panwar	Madhushree	4:59
5.	"Dhola"	Riaz Urehman Sagar	Raja Hasan	1:55

== Controversies ==
A concern has been raised by some of the dialogues in the movie by Saba Sikander, one of them being "Lekin humain sirf ye kehna hai ki wakai main agar kanoon aur vyavastha sabke liye ek samaan nahi hai toh bana dijiye ek naya Pakistan"(transl. If law and order is not the same for everyone, then create a new Pakistan).She said that "(...) Pakistan does have objections on this film.", to which Lom said that the comment doesn't hold ground due to freedom of expression given to artists.

== Promotion ==
Producer Sandeep Choudhary met PM Narendra Modi during his visit to Japan and discuss about the film. Team also invited PM to watch the film. Gavie Chahal drove a scooter painted with Yeh Hai India in Jaipur during the promotions. It is first time in Bollywood history that Baba Ramdev supported a film.

== Awards ==
- Best Film Award to Yeh Hai India at FOG Film Festival, USA 2017
- Best Director Award to Lomharsh at FOG Film Festival, USA 2017
- Special Jury Mention Award at JIFF, India
