= Mridang (film) =

Indian drama film

- Directed by: Ritesh S Kumar
- Screenplay by: Ritesh S Kumar
- Starring: Manoj Kumar Rao, Rose Laskar
- Cinematography: Navin V Mishra
- Edited by: Aanand A Ram
- Music by: Manoj Negi
- Production company: The Directors Cut
- Release date: 27 July 2018
- Country: India
- Language: Hindi

Mridang is an Indian Hindi drama film released in 2018. The director of this movie is Ritesh S Kumar and actor is Manoj Kumar Rao, Rose Laskar, Aaditya Singh.

== Plot ==
The story of this film is based on the journey of a naked man from Sultanganj to Deoghar.
