= Preeti Jhangiani =

Indian actress and model (born 1980)

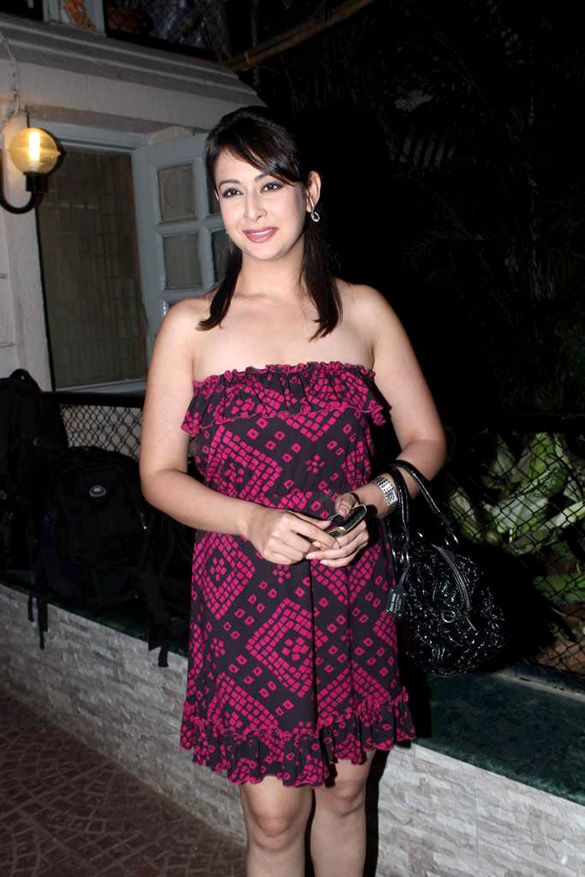
- Jhangiani in 2012
- Born: 18 August 1980 (age 46); Mumbai Maharashtra, India
- Occupations: Actress; model
- Years active: 1997-present
- Spouse: Parvin Dabbas (m. 2008)
- Children: 2

Preeti Jhangiani (born 18 August 1980) is an Indian actress who primarily works in Hindi and Telugu films. She made her acting debut with the Malayalam film Mazhavillu (1999) and her Hindi debut with the multi-starrer romantic film Mohabbatein (2000), for which she earned the IIFA Award for Star Debut of the Year – Female.

After appearing in Rajshri Productions music album Yeh Hai Prem in 1997, Jhangiani went on to work in various languages. She is known for her work in the Telugu films Thammudu (1999), Narasimha Naidu (2001) and the Hindi films Awara Paagal Deewana (2002), LOC: Kargil (2003) and Aan: Men at Work (2004). For her portrayal of a lower caste woman in Taawdo the Sunlight (2017), she won the Best Actress award at the Rajasthan Film Festival.

== Early life ==
Jhangiani was born on 18 August 1980, in Mumbai, into a Sindhi Hindu family. She completed her schooling from G D Somani Memorial School, Mumbai and partially attended Jai Hind College, Mumbai but never graduated.

== Career ==
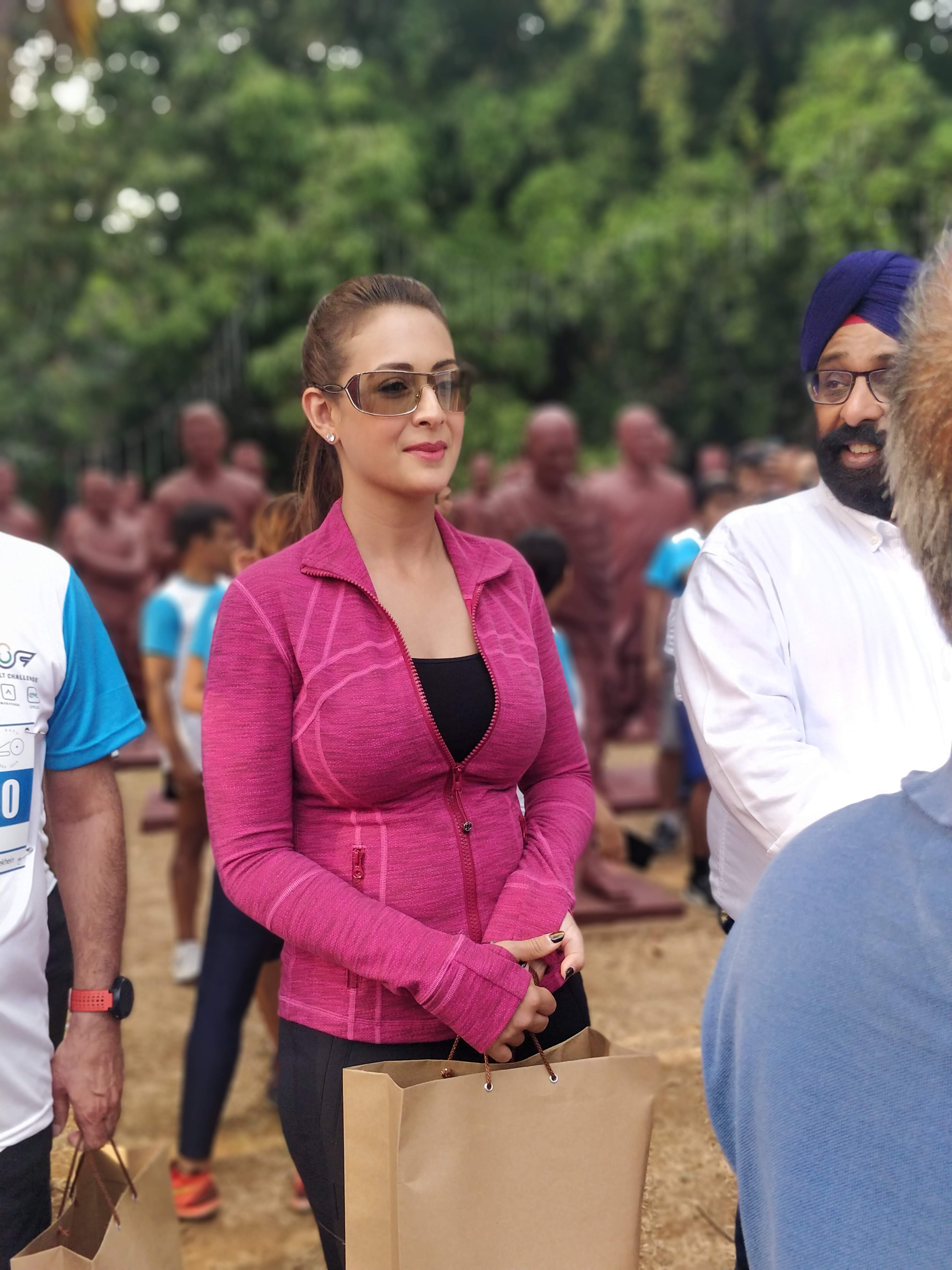
Jhangiani in 2018

Jhangiani first appeared in a Rajshri Productions music album Yeh Hai Prem opposite Abbas. This made them—as well as the Koala symbol used in the album—famous. Thereafter, she appeared in Nima Sandal soap ads and also various other ads

Her first film was in Malayalam alongside Malayalam star Kunchacko Boban which was called Mazhavillu (1999). She then acted in two Telugu films, Thammudu (1999) opposite Pawan Kalyan and Narasimha Naidu (2001) opposite Balakrishna. Thammudu released before Mazhavillu. She made her Bollywood debut in 2000 with Mohabbatein. Her next film was the comedy Awara Paagal Deewana (2002). She also acted in Punjabi films such as Sajna ve Sajna and Bikkar Bai Sentimental (2013).

Her latest release was the Rajasthani film (Rajjywood), Taawdo the Sunlight (2017) for which she won the Best Actress award at the Rajasthan International Film Festival (RIFF), and won special jury award for best actress in Rajasthan Film Festival 2017, Film was successful at boxoffice, Recently she appeared in The Pushkar Lodge.

Her latest release was the Bengali Movie Mistake directed by S.K Bangalore in the year 2013 and it was based on mistakes of our society which effect the student career. It was released globally.

Preeti stated in 2012 that she'd be making a comeback in the film industry after matrimony and motherhood.

== Personal life ==
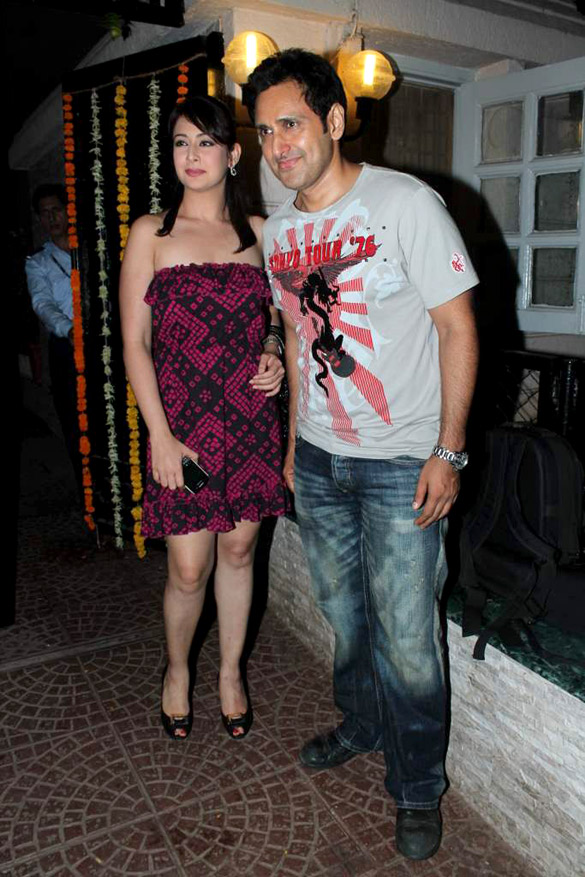
Jhangiani with husband Parvin Dabas

Jhangiani and actor Parvin Dabas met on the sets of With Love Tumhara in 2006. She and Dabas got married on 23 March 2008. Their first child, a son Jaiveer, was born on 11 April 2011. She gave birth to her second son Dev on 27 September 2016. She lives in Bandra with her family.

== Filmography ==
=== Films ===
Year	Title	Role	Language	Notes
1999	Thammudu	Janaki / Jaanu	Telugu	credited as Preeti Zingania
1999	Mazhavillu	Veena	Malayalam	
1999	Hello	Swetha	Tamil	
2000	Mohabbatein	Kiran Khanna	Hindi	
2001	Narasimha Naidu	Anjali	Telugu	
2001	Adhipathi	Anuradha	Telugu	
2002	Na Tum Jaano Na Hum		Hindi	Special appearance
2002	Awara Paagal Deewana	Preeti	Hindi	
2002	Waah! Tera Kya Kehna	Meena	Hindi	
2002	Annarth	Preeti	Hindi	
2003	Baaz: A Bird in Danger	Preeti Rastogi	Hindi	
2003	LOC Kargil	Balwan Singh's girlfriend	Hindi	
2004	Apparao Driving School	Anjali	Telugu	
2004	Aan: Men at Work	Janki	Hindi	
2004	Anandamanandamaye	Maheshwari	Telugu	
2004	Omkara	Divya	Kannada	
2005	Sauda -The Deal	Devika	Hindi	
2005	Ssukh	Sushila Chandraprakash Sharma	Hindi	
2005	Chehraa	Dr. Reena	Hindi	
2005	Chaahat – Ek Nasha	Rashmi S. Jaitly	Hindi	
2006	With Love Tumhara	Anuradha B. Singh	Hindi	
2006	Jaane Hoga Kya	Suchitra	Hindi	
2006	Chand Ke Paar Chalo	Nirmala / Garima	Hindi	
2007	Sajna Ve Sajna		Punjabi	
2007	Godfather: The Legend Continues	Naheed	Urdu	Pakistani film
2007	Pyar Kare Dis		Sindhi	
2007	Victoria No. 203	Devyani / Mona	Hindi	
2007	Yamadonga	Urvashi	Telugu	Special appearance
2008	Visakha Express	Suchitra	Telugu	
2009	Haseena: Smart, Sexy, Dangerous	Tina	Hindi	
2010	Tejam		Telugu	Item number
2010	As The River Flows		Hindi	
2011	The Masterpiece	Preeti	Hindi	Short Film
2011	Sahi Dhandhe Galat Bande	Shalini Mehta	Hindi	Also producer
2013	Dekho Ye Hai Mumbai Real Life		Hindi	
2013	Tony		Kannada	
2013	Kash Tum Hote		Hindi	
2013	Mistake		Bengali	
2013	Bikkar Bai Sentimental		Punjabi	
2017	Taawdo The Sunlight	Paalki	Rajasthani	
2025	Udaipur Files	Anjana Singh	Hindi	

=== Web series ===
Year	Title	Role	Language	Notes
2023	Kafas	Tanya Bajaj	Hindi	SonyLIV series

=== Music video appearance ===
Year	Album	Singer	Notes
1997	Yeh Hai Prem	Milind Ingle	Trilogy

== Accolades ==
Year	Award	Category	Work	Result	Ref.
2001	2nd IIFA Awards	Star Debut of the Year – Female	Mohabbatein	Won	
2001	Zee Cine Awards	Best Female Debut	Mohabbatein	Nominated	
2001	Sansui Viewers' Choice Movie Awards	Most Promising Debut Actress	Mohabbatein	Nominated	
2001	People's Choice Awards India	Favourite Debut Actor – Female	Mohabbatein	Nominated	
2017	5th Rajasthan International Film Festival	Best Actress	Taawdo the Sunlight	Won	

== See also ==
- List of Indian film actresses
