= Jacqueline I Am Coming =

2019 Indian Hindi-language drama film by Banty Dubey

- Film poster
- Directed by: Banty Dubey
- Written by: Pinku Dubey
- Produced by: Manjesh Giri
- Starring: Raghubir Yadav; Diiva Dhanoya; Shakti Kumar; Kiran Patil
- Cinematography: Saravanan Elavarasu
- Edited by: Sachin Kunal
- Music by: Vipin Patwa
- Production company: MD Production
- Distributed by: Platoon One Films
- Release date: 18 October 2019
- Country: India
- Language: Hindi

Jacqueline I Am Coming is a 2019 Indian Hindi-language drama film directed by Banty Dubey and produced by Manjesh Giri under the banner MD Production. The film stars Raghubir Yadav, Diiva Dhanoya, Shakti Kumar, and Kiran Patil.

The film premiered at the 2019 Rajasthan International Film Festival and was released on 18 October 2019.

== Cast ==
- Raghubir Yadav as a Kashi Tiwary
- Diiva Dhanoya as Jacqueline
- Shakti Kumar as Dr. Arjun
- Kiran Patil as Keshav
