= Blackboard vs Whiteboard =

- Directed by: Tarun s Bisht
- Written by: Gireesh Tiwary
- Produced by: Ashutosh Singh Ratan; Nupur Shrivastava; Gireesh Tiwary
- Starring: Raghuvir Yadav; Ashok Samarth; Akhilendra Mishra
- Cinematography: Dharmendra Singh Sisodiya
- Edited by: Birju Rajak
- Music by: Jayant Aryan
- Production companies: Milestone Creations; Ratan Shree Entertainment
- Release date: 12 April 2019
- Running time: 152 minutes
- Country: India
- Language: Hindi

Blackboard vs Whiteboard is a 2019 Indian Hindi-language film, which is directed by Tarun s Bisht and produced by Nupur Shrivastava, Gireesh Tiwary and Ashutosh Singh Ratan. The film stars Raghuvir Yadav, Ashok Samarth, Dharmendra Singh, Alismita Goswami, Akhilendra Mishra and Pankaj Jha in lead roles. The story of this film is based the education system. It is set to release on 12 April 2019.

== Cast ==
- Raghuvir Yadav as Dinanath
- Ashok Samarth as Mukhiya Gajraj Singh
- Akhilendra Mishra as Lawyer Tripathi
- Abhavya Sharma as Pinky
- Pankaj Jha as Mishri
- Alismita Goswami as Rashmi
- Dharmendra Singh as Amit
- Ashutosh Singh Ratan
- Dharmendra
- Madhu Roy as Punita
- Ashish Mishra as Gopal
- Manu Krishna as Hemraj Singh Hemu

== Soundtrack ==
Blackboard vs Whiteboard

Soundtrack album by Jayant Aryann
- Released: 28 January 2019
- Recorded: 2019
- Genre: Feature Film Soundtrack
- Length: 22:23
- Label: Zee Music Company

The music of the film was composed by Jayant Aryan with lyrics written by Surya Sharma Samudra, Roop Agarwal and Gireesh Tiwary.

Track listing
No.	Title	Singer(s)	Length
1.	"School Chalo Tum"	Raghubir Yadav	04:2
2.	"Kuchh Ankahi Si"	Nazim K Ali, Sarodee Borah	4:21
3.	"Lalan Mora"	Raghubir Yadav	4:56
4.	"Dhoop Bane Hum"	Amit Mutreja	4:13
5.	"Bahte Pani Sa"	Vikrant Bhartiya	5:31
