= Jaoon Kahan Bata Ae Dil =

Indian Hindi-language comedy drama on Netflix

- Directed by: Aadish Keluskar
- Written by: Aadish Keluskar
- Produced by: Vinay Mishra; Pallavi Rohatgi; Preety Ali; Raghavan Bharadwaj
- Starring: Khushboo Upadhyay; Rohit Kokate; Himanshu Kohli; Mohammed Shakir
- Cinematography: Amey V Chavan
- Edited by: Anvay Shinde
- Music by: Aishwarya Malgave
- Production company: Humaramovie
- Distributed by: Netflix
- Release dates: October 2018 (Mumbai Film Festival); 21 June 2019
- Running time: 106 minutes
- Country: India
- Languages: Hindi; English

Jaoon Kahan Bata Ae Dil or Lovefucked is an Indian Hindi-language romantic drama film directed by Aadish Keluskar.

== Cast ==
- Khushboo Upadhyay
- Rohit Kokate
- Himanshu Kohli

== Release ==
It was released on August 9, 2019 on Netflix streaming.

== Reception ==
=== Critical response ===
Udita Jhunjhunwala of Firstpost gave the film 3 out of 5 stars stating that the lead actors threw themselves into their parts in a film that is an absorbing take on modern-day love with Mumbai at its center. Sankhyan Ghosh writing for Film Companion also gives the film 3 stars out of 5 calling it a provocative anti-romance set in Mumbai.
