= Vijay Suthar =

Indian film director, producer, and screenwriter (born 1987)

- Vijay on the set of Mangiyo
- Born: 25 November 1987 (age 38); Rajasthan, India
- Occupations: Film director, producer, screenwriter
- Years active: 2017–present

Vijay Suthar (born 25 November 1987) is an Indian film director, producer, and screenwriter from Sri Ganganagar , Rajasthan prominently working in Hindi and Rajasthani cinema.

== Career ==
Suthar made his directorial debut with rajasthani filmTaawdo the Sunlight, which was screened at the Rajasthan International Film Festival (RIFF) and won multiple awards, including Best Rajasthani Film. He later directed the Hindi film The Pushkar Lodge (2019).

Suthar also directed web series including Karj Ro Ghunghat (2022) and Chaudhary Saab Ri Chatur Family (2023).

In 2025, he directed Plot Number 302, which won the Best Film award at RIFF.

In 2026, Suthar directed Offline, a Rajasthani action-thriller film based on urban crime and safety issues. The film features actors including Javed Khan, Sudesh Berry, and Neelu Vaghela, and was released on 27 March 2026. It received media attention for its trailer launch and promotional events in Jaipur. recently he written and directed a Ounjabi film Saintali based on partition starring vetern actress Seema Kaushal & Yogesh Chhabra

== Filmography ==
Year	Title	Role	Notes
2017	Taawdo the Sunlight	Writer & Director	Best Rajasthani Film at RIFF
2019	The Pushkar Lodge	Writer & Director	Hindi film
2022	Karj Ro Ghunghat	Writer & Director	Web series
2023	Chaudhary Saab Ri Chatur Family	Writer & Director	Web series
2025	Plot Number 302	Writer & Director	Best Film at RIFF
2026	Offline	Writer & Director	Rajasthani film
2026	Saintali	Writer & Director	Punjabi Film
