= List of Rajasthani-language films =

List of films in the Rajasthani language

This is a list of films that are partly or entirely in Rajasthani.

== 1940 to 1949 ==
Movie name	Rajasthani	Year	Notes
Nazrana	नजराना	1942	First movie made in Rajasthani language

== 1960 to 1969 ==
Movie name	Rajasthani	Year	Notes
Babasa Ri Ladli	बाबासा री लाडली	1961	First Rajasthani movie with songs filmed in colour. First blockbuster Rajasthani movie
Nani Bai Mayaro	नानी बाई को मायरो	1962	
Baba Ramdev	बाबा रामदेव	1963	
Baba Ramdevpir	बाबा रामदेव पीर	1963	
Gangaur	गणगौर	1964	
Dhani-Lugayi	धणी-लुगाई	1964	
Dhola-Marvan	ढोला-मरवण	1964	
Gopichand Bhartar hari	गोपीचंद भरथ री	1965	Original Gujarati, dubbed in Rajasthani
Gogaji Pir	गोगाजी पीर	1969	

== 1970 to 1979 ==
Movie name	Rajasthani	Year	Notes
Laaj Rakho Rani Sati	लाज राखो राणी सती	1973	

== 1980 to 1989 ==
Movie name	Rajasthani	Year	Notes
Supattar Binani	सुपातर बिनणी	1981	
Veer Tejaji	वीर तेजाजी	1982	
Gangaur	गणगौर	1982	
Sati Suhagan	सती सुहागण	1982	
Mhari Pyari Chanana	म्हारी प्यारी चनणा	1983	
Suhag Ro Singar	सुहाग रो सिणगार	1983	
Piya Milan Ri Aas	पिया मिलण री आस	1983	
Chokho Lage Sasariyo	चोखो लागे सासरियो	1983	
Sawan Ri Teej	सावण री तीज	1984	
Ramu-Chanana	रामू-चनणा	1984	
Derani-Jethani	देराणी-जेठाणी	1985	
Doongar Ro Bhed	डूंगर रो भेद	1985	
Nanand-Bhojai	नणद-भोजाई	1985	
Thari-Mhari	थारी-म्हारी	1987	
Dharam Bhai	धरम भाई	1987	Original Gujarati, dubbed in Rajasthani
Jai Baba Ramdev	जय बाबा रामदेव	1987	Original Gujarati, dubbed in Rajasthani
Aachyo Jayo Gigalo	आच्छो जायो गीगलो	1987	
Karmabai	करमा बाई	1988	
Dhola-Maru	ढोला-मारु	1988	Original Gujarati, dubbed in Rajasthani
Nanibai Ro Mayaro	नानीबाई रो मायरो	1988	
Bai Chali Sasariye	बाई चाली सासरीये	1988	Remade in Marathi as Maherchi Sadi (1991) and in Hindi as Saajan Ka Ghar (1994).
Bai Ra Bhag	बाई रा भाग	1988	Original Gujarati, dubbed in Rajasthani
Ramayan	रामायण	1988	
Baisa Ra Jatan Karo	बाईसा रा जतन करो	1989	
Satwadi Raja Harishchandra	सतवादी राजा हरिश्चंद्र	1989	Original Gujarati, dubbed in Rajasthani
Ramkudi-Jhamkudie	रमकुड़ी-झमकुड़ी	1989	
Ghar Me Raaj Lugayan Ko	घर में राज लुगायां को	1989	
Beti Rajasthan Ri	बेटी राजस्थान री	1989	
Chanda Thare Chandane	चांदा थारे चांदणै	1989	
Ma Mhane Kyu Parnayi	मां म्हाने क्यूं परणाई	1989	

== 1990 to 1999 ==
Movie name	Rajasthani	Year	Notes
Binani Bot denane Chali	बिनणी बोट देणने चाली	1990	
Vari Jaun Balaji	वारी जाऊं बालाजी	1990	
Dadosa Ri Ladli	दादोसा री लाडली	1990	
Suhag Ri Aas	सुहाग री आस	1990	
Mati Ri Aan	माटी री आण	1990	
Bhomli	भोमली	1991	
Bhai Dooj	भाई दूज	1991	
Bandhan Vachana Ro	बंधन वचनां रो	1991	
Ma Rakho Laaj Mhari	मां राखो लाज म्हारी	1991	
Jai Karni Mata	जय करणी माता	1991	
Chunadi	चूनड़ी	1992	
Lichhami Aayi Aangane	लिछमी आयी आंगणै	1992	
Binani	बिनणी	1992	
Raamgarh Ri Raamli	रामगढ़ री रामली	1993	
Khun Ro Tiko	खुन रौ टीको	1993	
Jaatani	जाटणी	1993	
Beera Bego Aayije Re	बीरा बेगो आईजे रे	1993	
Gauri	गौरी	1993	
Diggipuri Ka Raaja	डिग्गीपुरी का राजा	1993	
Baba Ramdev	बाबा रामदेव	1994	
Baalam Thari Chunadi	बालम थारी चूनड़ी	1994	Producer: Jagdish Chandra Joshi
Beti Huyi Parayi Re	बेटी हुयी परई रे	1994	
Dudh Ro Karaj	दूध रो करज	1995	Dubbed in Rajasthani
Binani Huve To Iso	बिनणी हुवे तो इसी	1995	Starring: Prithvi Vazir, Farha Naaz
Bapuji Ne Chaye Binani	बापूजी ने चाये बिनणी	1995	
Radhu Ki Lichhami	राधू की लिछमी	1996	
Chhammak Chhallo	छमक छल्लो	1996	
Mata Rani Bhatiyani	माता राणी भटियाणी	1996	
Lachha Gujari	लाछा गूजरी	1997	
Jiyo Mhara Laal	जीयो म्हारा लाल	1997	
Dev	देव	1998	
Jai Nakoda Bhairav	जय नाकोड़ा भैरव	1998	
Suhag Ri Mehandi	सुहाग री मेहंदी	1998	
Sasroop Baisa	सरुप बाईसा	1999	

== 2000 to 2009 ==
Movie name	Rajasthani	Year	Notes
Jai Salasar Hanuman	जय सालासर हनुमान	2000	
Koyaladi	कोयलड़ी	2000	
Gori Ro Pallo Latake	गोरी रो पल्लो लटके	2000	
Mhari Ma Santoshi	म्हारी मां संतोषी	2000	
Chhail-Chhabili Chhori	छैल-छबीली छोरी	2001	
Ma Rajasthan Ri	मां राजस्थान री	2002	
Jai Jeen Mata	जय जीण माता	2003	
Chokhi Aayi Binani	चोखी आई बीनणी	2004	
Mehandi Rachya Hath	मेहंदी राच्या हाथ	2004	
Khamma-Khamma Veer Teja	खम्मा-खम्मा वीर तेजा	2004	
Maa-Baap Ne Bhulajo Mati	मां-बाप ने भूलजो मती	2004	
O Jee Re Deewana	ओ जी रे दीवाना	2004	
Laadki	लाड़की	2005	
Laadlo	लाड़लौ	2005	
Jai shree Aai Mata	जय श्री आई माता	2006	
Parayi Beti	पराई बेटी	2006	Starring Karmveer Choudhary
Mharo Beero H Ghanshyam	म्हारो बीरो हैं घनश्याम	2007	Starring Shravan Sagar
Preet Na Jane Reet	प्रीत ना जाणै रीत	2006	
Mhaara Shyam Dhani Datar	म्हारा श्याम धणी दातार	2007	
Maa Thari Olu Ghani Aave	मां थारी ओळू घणी आवे	2007	
Jai Maa Joganiya	जै मां जोगणिया	2007	
Kanhaiyo	कन्हैयो	2007	Directed by Anil Kulchainiya; stars Arun Govil
Thaaro-Mharo Rajasthan	थारो-म्हारो राजस्थान	2008	
Ma Bhatiyani Ro Ratijogo	मां भटियाणी रो रातीजोगो	2008	Starring Karmveer Choudhary
Hivade Su Door Mat Jaa	हिवडे सूं दूर मत जा	2008	Starring Karmveer Choudhary
Odhali Chunariya	ओढली चूनरिया	2008	Starring Karmveer Choudhary
Ranuja Ke Raja		2009	Produced by Dr. Dinesh Ojha & Dr. Bhanunjay Dhawar
Kirpa Karo Shri Sundha Mata	किरपा करो श्री सुंधा माता	2009	
Beero Bhat Bharan Ne Aayo	बीरो भात भरण ने आयो	2009	Directed by Anil Kulchainiya
Supatar Beti	सुपातर बेटी	2009	
Thane Naina Me Basalu	थांने नैणां में बसालूं	2009	Starring Karmveer Choudhary

== 2010 to 2019 ==
Movie name	Rajasthani	Year	Notes
Khoto Sikko	खोटो सिक्को	2010	First film since 1942 certified as "Marwari"
Baisa Ranaraj	बाईसा राणाराज	2010	
Jai Aavri Mata	जय आवरी माता	2010	
Haat	हाट	2010	
Maati Ka Laal Meena Gurjar	माटी का लाल मीणा गुर्जर	2011	Director: Lakhvinder Singh
Mehar Karo Paplaj Mata	महर करो पपलाज माता	2011	Director: Lakhvinder Singh
Laado Marudhara ri Shan	लाड़ो मरुधरा री शान	2011	
Patelan	पटेलण	2011	Starring Shravan Sagar
Fauji Ki Family	फौजी की फेमिली	2011	Release: 18 February 2011
Chundri Odhasi Mahro Bir	चूंदड़ी ओढासी म्हारो वीर	2012	Winner of multiple Rajasthan Film Awards
Bhobhar	भोभर	2012	Drama film
Bhawari	भंवरी	2012	Director: Lakhvinder Singh
Dangal	दंगल	2013	Starring Shravan Sagar and Karmveer Choudhary
Educated Binani	एजुकेटेड बीनणी	2013	
Fauji Ki Family-2	फौजी की फेमिली-2	2013	Release: 22 February 2013
Hukum	हुकुम	2014	Director: Lakhvinder Singh
Marudhar Mharo Ghar	मरुधर म्हारो घऱ	2014	Written by Tauqueer Alam
Mahari Supatar Beendani	सुपातर बिनणी	2014	Directed by Sanjay Saksena
Taanko Bhid Gayo	टांको भ़ीड गयाे	2014	
Tandav	तांडव	2014	Director: Lakhvinder Singh
Raju Rathod	राजू राठोड	2014	Starring Shravan Sagar
Birani Sardar	बिरानी सरदार	2015	Prakash Gandhi project
Student Life	स्टूडेंट लाइफ	2015	Dinesh Rajpurohit
Fear Face	फियर फेश	2016	Dinesh Rajpurohit
Mero Badloo		2015	
Pagdi	पगड़ी	2016	Starring Shravan Sagar and Ruhi Chaturvedi
Kajrali Nakhrali	कजराली नख़राली	2016	Director: Lakhvinder Singh
Laadli	लाडली	2016	Director: Vipin Tiwari
Gauru Journey of Courage	गौरू जर्नी ऑफ कॉर्ज	2016	
Rukna rajasthani	रुकमा राजस्थानी	2016	Meena parbhu jorwal
Nani Bai Ro Mayro	नानी बाई रो मायरो	2017	Editor: Himanshu Tiwari
Taawdo the Sunlight	तावड़ो द सनलाइट	2017	Director: Vijay Suthar
Mhari Mayad	म्हारी मायड़	2019	Directed by Dinesh Rajpurohit
Shankhnaad	शंखनाद	2019	Director: Santosh Kranti Mishra

== 2020 to 2026 ==
Movie name	Rajasthani	Year	Notes
Riti Rivaj	रीति रिवाज	2020	Directed by Dinesh Rajpurohit
Vachan	वचन	2020	Director: Hemanth Seervi
Aulaad Ro Rang	औलाद रो रंग	2020	Director: Anil Saini
Naanera	नानेरा	2021	Director: Deepankar Prakash
Aata Sata	आटा साटा	2022	Starring Shravan Sagar
Majo Aa Gayo	मजो आ गयो	2022	Director: Lakhvinder Singh
Sarpanch	सरपंच	2023	Rajasthan's First Web Series; Dir: Pankaz Singh Tanwar
Nuchwana	नुचवाणा	2023	First Rajasthani Horror Comedy; Dir: Dhruv Sankhala
Rees	रीस	2024	Director: Pankaz Singh Tanwar
Bharkhama	भरखमा	2024	Starring Shravan Sagar and Anjali Raghav
Taandav Dujo	तांडव दूजो	2024	Director: Lakhvinder Singh. First Rajasthani film in Rajmandir Housefull show.
Plot Number 302	प्लॉट नंबर 302	2025	Director: Vijay Suthar
Aavakara		2025	Horror film; Dir. Dinesh Rajpurohit
Offline	ऑफलाइन	2026	Director: Vijay Suthar
Dhood	धूड़	2026	Directed by- Anand Singh Chouhan, Starring- Yashpal Sharma (actor), Alka Amin
