= Rajasthan Film Festival 2013 =

Indian Film Festival

1st RFF
Date	28 September 2013
Site	Deep SmritiMansarover
Host	Kabeer, Man and Moniya
Highlights
Best PictureRajasthani Best Picture Hindi Us Disha me	Bhobhar

An awards ceremony where the Cinema of Rajasthani was honored at the Rajasthan Film Festival.

Kanchan Cassette and Series organized the first Rajasthan Film Festival Award Ceremony to honor Rajasthan Cinema (Rajjywood), Art, Culture, and Artists at Deep Smriti Auditorium in Jaipur, India.

The ceremony began with a documentary of 70 years of Cinema of Rajasthani. The artists, producers, directors and others associated with cinema, saluted and applauded the roots and significance of Rajasthan. Attendees expressed their heartfelt feelings and progressed to the development of film industry.

Artists of Hindi and Rajasthani Cinema in all categories were given awards. In addition O.P. Vyas, Gulabo Sapera, Mohan Singh Rathore, Veena Cassettes, Modern Videos, Neelu Wagela, Khistiz Kumar, and Ramesh Tiwari were awarded with " Life Time Achievement " Awards. Mahesh Joshi presided the function.
