= Priyanka Khimani =

Indian intellectual property lawyer

Priyanka Mohammed Hussain Khimani is an Indian intellectual property lawyer and former screenwriter from Mumbai. Her clients have included AP Dhillon, A.R Rahman, Prateek Kuhad, Divine (rapper), Badshah (rapper), Anurag Kashyap, Sameer Saxena, Arijit Singh, Shreya Ghoshal, Shankar Ehsaan Loy, Sushmita Sen, Sushant Singh Rajput, Sonu Nigam and Lata Mangeshkar.

Khimani was included in Billboard magazine's 2023 Billboard Women in Music list, and is the only Indian executive to have been included in the list.

== Early life ==
Khimani grew up in a chawl with her parents in Mahim in Mumbai. While going to college, she worked as a screenwriter for Tamanna House at the age of 15.

== Career ==
Khiman's law firm Khimani & Associates has its office in Nariman Point. She was also announced as a board of member alongside Alex Rigopulos for Songtradr in June 2024. Her first legal case was for Indian singer Lata Mangeshkar. She represented Bollywood director Anurag Kashyap on #MeToo allegations. She also handled rapper Badshah case which was interrogated by Mumbai Police related to fake social media followers. Khimani also negotiated singer AP Dhillon deal for Lollapalooza's Indian debut.
