= Upasana Singh =

Indian actress and stand-up comedian (born 1966)

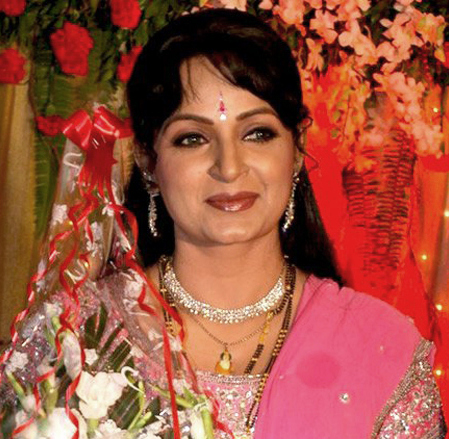
- Singh in 2009
- Born: 29 June 1975 (age 51); Hoshiarpur, Punjab, India
- Occupation: Actress
- Years active: 1986–present
- Notable work: Comedy Nights with Kapil (2013–2016)
- Spouse: Neeraj Bharadwaj (m. 2009)

Upasana Singh (born 29 June 1975) is an Indian actress who works in Hindi, Punjabi, and Rajasthani language films.

Singh played the role of a deaf-mute in the 1997 film Judaai. She appeared on television in Son Pari as Cruella/Kalipari, a dark fairy, in the sitcom on Doordarshan's Phir Bhi Dil Hai Hindustani and the Zee thriller show Tamanna House. She also played small roles in Priyadarshan's and David Dhawan's films as a regular cast.

She played the character of "Bua" (paternal aunt) in the TV show Comedy Nights with Kapil, which got her widespread critical acclaim. She has appeared in Bollywood films as well as regional cinema such as Punjabi, Bhojpuri, Rajasthani, and Gujarati.

== Career ==
She appeared in the 1988 film Bai Chali Sasariye. Since then, she has acted in many regional films and is a known face in the Punjabi, Gujarati, and Hindi film industries. She has also played supporting roles for the films Darr, Jawani Zindabad, Loafer, Judaai, Main Prem Ki Diwani Hoon, Mujhse Shaadi Karogi, Aitraaz, Old Is Gold, My Friend Ganesha, Golmaal Returns, and Hungama.

Singh has appeared in series like Raja Ki Aayegi Baraat, Pari Hoon Main, Maayka, Ye Meri Life Hai, Bani - Ishq Da Kalma and Sonpari. Singh became a household name with her stint as Tarawanti on Nadaniyaan and the desperate "Bua" (paternal aunt) in the TV show Comedy Nights with Kapil, particularly for her catch-phrase "Bittu, Kaun hai ye aadmi?" (Bittu, who is this man?). Singh has also acted in Bollywood comedy movies such as Mujhse Shaadi Karogi and Golmaal Returns. In 2015, she played the role of Manjeet in Chalk N Duster, alongside Juhi Chawla, Shabana Azmi and Girish Karnad.

In 2017, Singh bagged a role in Judwaa 2, alongside Varun Dhawan, Jacqueline Fernandez and Taapsee Pannu.

She has also been a part of the sequel of the Punjabi film Carry On Jatta, which was one of the highest grossing Punjabi films in India. The movie stars Gippy Grewal, Sonam Bajwa and Jaswinder Bhalla. She plays the role of Panchami (Bebe), Pancham's mother SAB TV's comedy serial Jijaji Chhat Per Hain. She returned to television in Gangs of Filmistan.

== Filmography ==
=== Films ===
Year	Film	Role	Language	Note
1988	Bai Chali Sasariye	Laxmi	Rajasthani	
1989	Paap Ki Saza		Hindi	
1990	Jawani Zindabad	Rosie	Hindi	
1991	Subedaar		Punjabi	
1991	Badla Jatti Da	Laali	Punjabi	
1992	Main Hoon Geeta	Geeta	Hindi	Lead role
1992	Ganga Ki Vachan	Ganga	Hindi	Lead role
1992	Ramwati	Ramwati	Hindi	Lead role
1992	Sanam Tere Hain Hum		Hindi	
1992	Insaaf Ki Devi	Chandramukhi	Hindi	
1993	Aaj Ki Taaqat		Hindi	Lead role
1993	Dosti Ki Saugandh		Hindi	
1993	Bedardi	Mane sote diya jagay	Hindi	Cameo
1993	Khoon Ka Sindoor	Police Inspector Asha Sharma	Hindi	Lead role
1993	Darr	Dancer at Marriage ceremony	Hindi	
1995	Ab To Jeene Do		Hindi	
1995	Ashique Mastana	Esha	Hindi	
1996	Loafer	Woman flirted with Bhiku	Hindi	
1996	Bhishma	Bharti Verma	Hindi	
1997	Ganga Maange Khoon		Hindi	
1997	Judaai	Vaani	Hindi	
1997	Krishna Arjun	Meera	Hindi	
1997	Deewana Mastana	Neha's Aunt	Hindi	
1997	Mr. and Mrs. Khiladi	Pratap's Girlfriend	Hindi	
1998	Sarbans Dani Guru Gobind Singh		Punjabi	
1999	Sarfarosh	Mala	Hindi	
2000	Kothewali		Hindi	
2000	Bhai Thakur	Janki	Hindi	
2000	Badal	Guler Mehndi's Wife	Hindi	
2000	Bidhatar Khela	Shikha	Bengali	Special appearance
2000	Hamara Dil Aapke Paas Hai		Hindi	
2002	Ek Aur Visphot	Mala	Hindi	
2002	Haan Maine Bhi Pyaar Kiya	Kismis Khajoora	Hindi	
2002	Angaar -The Fire		Hindi	
2002	Jaani Dushman: Ek Anokhi Kahani	Nikki	Hindi	
2003	Talaash: The Hunt Begins...	Herself	Hindi	Cameo
2003	Hum Hain Pyar Mein	Herself	Hindi	
2003	Ishq Vishk	Kamlabai	Hindi	
2003	Main Prem Ki Diwani Hoon	Secretary	Hindi	
2003	Hungama	Dulari	Hindi	
2004	Mujhse Shaadi Karogi	Mrs. Surya Prakash	Hindi	
2004	Mysteries Shaque	Paramjeet	Hindi	
2004	Aitraaz	Kanchan	Hindi	
2004	Hulchul	Mrs. Surya	Hindi	
2005	Naari Ek Khilona?	Janki Madam	Hindi	
2005	Model - The Beauty		Hindi	
2005	Mahiya - Call of Love		Hindi	
2005	Jalwa - Fun In Love	Manjit Kaur 'Munnu'	Hindi	
2005	Raja Bhai Lagey Raho	Herself	Hindi	Cameo
2005	Vaah! Life Ho Toh Aisi!	Mrs. Vishal Sharma	Hindi	
2006	Love In Japan	Barkha Rani	Hindi	
2006	Chand Ke Paar Chalo	Lajjo	Hindi	
2006	Humko Deewana Kar Gaye	Paramjeet G. Ghuggi	Hindi	
2006	Aatma	Shanta	Hindi	
2006	Iqraar by Chance	Kalawati 'Kal' Talwar	Hindi	
2006	Hota Hai Dil Pyaar Mein Paagal		Hindi	
2007	Old Is Gold	Neha	Hindi	
2007	My Friend Ganesha	Gangu Tai	Hindi	
2008	Mr. Black Mr. White	Sardar's wife	Hindi	
2008	Don Muthu Swami	Barkha	Hindi	
2008	Hastey Hastey	Mrs. Malhotra	Hindi	
2008	Good Luck!	Anjali M. Khurana	Hindi	
2008	God Tussi Great Ho	Maid	Hindi	
2008	My Friend Ganesha 2	Gangu Tai	Hindi	
2008	Golmaal Returns	Lucky's customer	Hindi	Cameo
2008	Chak De Phatte	Don Shamsher	Punjabi	
2008	Wattanaan Ton Door		Punjabi	
2009	Chal Chala Chal	Chhaya U. Upadhyay	Hindi	
2009	Ek: The Power of One	Manjeet bua	Hindi	
2010	Idiot Box	T.V. Mirchandani	Hindi	
2011	Who Is There Kaun Hain Wahan		Hindi	
2012	Jatt & Juliet	Chhanno Kaur	Punjabi	
2012	Tension Mat Le yaar	Inspector	Hindi	
2012	Bhanvari Ka Jaal	Aunty	Hindi	
2012	Love Recipe		Hindi	
2013	Daddy Cool Munde Fool	Mrs Pappy	Punjabi	
2014	Disco Singh	Pammi	Punjabi	
2014	Taanko Bhid Gayo	PG Aunty	Rajasthani	
2015	Wedding Pullav	Adi's mother	Hindi	
2015	Control Bhaji Control	Nikki ji	Punjabi	
2015	P Se PM Tak		Hindi	
2015	Hum Sab Ullu Hain	Kamla Kalyani	Hindi	
2015	22g Tussi Ghaint Ho	Gulabo	Punjabi	
2015	Myself Pendu	MummyJi	Punjabi	
2016	Chalk n Duster	Manjeet	Hindi	
2017	Judwaa 2	Manmeet Jain(Samara's Mother)	Hindi	
2018	Carry on Jatta 2	Channo	Punjabi	
2019	Ardab Mutiyaran		Punjabi	
2019	Jind Jaan	Bhuaa	Punjabi	
2019	Naukar Vahuti Da	Simran Sidhu	Punjabi	
2020	Street Dancer 3D	Jasleen Kaur Chaddha	Hindi	
2020	Sayonee	Raj's Mother	Hindi	
2022	Babli Bouncer	Dolly Chaddha	Hindi	
2022	Bai Ji Kuttange		Punjabi	Also producer
2023	Hume Toh Loot Liya		Hindi	MX Player film
2025	Tomchi		Hindi	
2025	Badaa Karara Pudna	Angrez Kaur	Punjabi	

=== Television ===
Year	Title	Role	Notes
1997–2000	Jai Hanuman	Mohini	
1997	Om Namah Shivay	Mohini	
2000–2004	Sonpari	Kaali Pari/Cruella aunty	
2003	Lady Inspector: Thrills and spills	Lady Inspector	
2003–2006	Phir Bhi Dil Hai Hindustani	Ganga Om Bhushan	
2004–2005	Ye Meri Life Hai		
2004	Tamanna House		
2007–2009	Maayka	Lovely Bua	
2007–2010	Dill Mill Gayye	Sid's mom	
2008–2010	Raja Ki Aayegi Baraat	Bhanumati	
2008	Pari Hoon Main	Mamiji	
2009	Aashiq Biwi Ka	Radha Devi/Ghost Mother	
2011–2013	Mrs. Kaushik Ki Paanch Bahuein		
2012	Yeh Zindagi Hai Gulshan		
2013–2014	Bani - Ishq Da Kalma	Buaji	
2013–2016	Comedy Nights with Kapil	Pinky Sharma	
2013–2017	Nadaniyaan	Taravanti Verma, Nandu and Pappu's mother	Lead role
2015–2017	Santoshi Maa	Madhu Pratap Singh	
2016	Comedy Nights Live	Pinky Sharma	
2016–2017	The Kapil Sharma Show	Twinkle	
2017	Nach Baliye 8	Host	
2017–2018	The Drama Company	Various characters	
2018–2019	Jijaji Chhat Per Hain	Panchami	
2018–2019	Chalo Saaf Karein		Episodic role
2018–2019	Kanpur Wale Khuranas	Pramod's sister in law	
2020	Gangs of Filmistan	Various characters	
2022	Masoom		
