= Bhobhar =

- film poster
- Directed by: Gajendra S. Shrotriya
- Written by: Gajendra S. Shrotriya
- Story by: Ramkumar Singh
- Produced by: Gajendra S. Shrotriya; Sanjay Harpavat; Sanjay Yadav
- Starring: Amit Saxena; Uttaranshy; Vikas Pareek; Vinod Aacharya
- Cinematography: Yogesh Sharma
- Edited by: Gajendra S. Shrotriya
- Music by: Daan Singh; Rajiv Thanvi; J N Tripathi
- Production company: Harbinger Creations
- Distributed by: Harbinger Creations
- Release date: 17 February 2012
- Running time: 100 minutes
- Country: India
- Language: Rajasthani

Bhobhar (English: The Live Ash) is a 2012 Rajasthani-language drama film written and directed by Gajendra S. Shrotriya. Besides some senior theatre artists like S N Purohit, Harinarayan Sharma, Anil Marwari, Sanjay Vidrohi, and Vasudev Bhatt in the supporting roles, the lead cast of Amit Saxena, Uttaranshy Pareek and Vikas Pareek are all from Jaipur. The film also highlights the culture and lifestyle of Rajasthan.

== Plot ==
Bhobhar explores the life and relationship of a small farmer Rawat in rural Rajasthan, India. It is the story of a small village farmer Rewat who despite being an alcoholic is hardworking and warm-hearted. His life gets shattered one night when he catches his close friend Puran sneaking out of his room. Beaten up Puran accuses that an alcoholic's wife is no more than a whore. Rewat stops communicating with his wife Sohni since that day. One day when Sohni and his youngest son Ganesh beat up his other son Shanker for marrying a girl from another cast, inebriated Rewat calls Sohni a whore. Ganesh slaps his father for insulting his mother. Dismayed Rewat leaves his house and family until Puran finds him in the hospital. Puran meets Sohni and tells her about Rewat. The feelings of Sohni for Rewat gets rekindled alike Bhobhar (the live ash). Also begins the redemption of Puran and the story unfolds.

== Cast ==
- Amit Saxena as Rewat
- Uttaranshy Pareek as Sohni
- Vikas Pareek as Puran
- Ajay Jain as Mahaveer
- Nidhi Jain as Mahaveer's wife
- Anil Marwari as Ganesh
- Sanjay Vidrohi as MLA
- Vishal Bhatt as Jagdeesh
- Vinod Acharya as Sankar
- Vasudev Bhatt as Panch
- Babita Madaan as Singaari Tai
- Hari Narayan Sharma as Master
- Satya Narayan Purohit as Old man in field

== Production ==
Shooting of the film Bhobhar was completed in October 2010. After two and a half months of post-production, the film was sent to several national and international film festivals with subtitles in English. The film is majorly in Rajasthani language to suit the milieu of the story. This is a Harbinger Creations production directed by Gajendra S. Shrotriya.

== Music ==
Ramkumar Singh created the lyrics and Amit Ojha, the background score.

Bhobhar

Soundtrack album by Rajeev Thanvi, Daan Singh & Jai Narayan Tripathi
- Released: 10 February 2012
- Genre: Feature film soundtrack
- Length: 19:40
- Language: Rajasthani
- Label: Harbinger Creations
- Producer: Harbinger Creations

| No. | Title | Music | Singer(s) | Length |
|---|---|---|---|---|
| 1. | "Pihu Pihu" | Rajeev Thanvi | Shikha Mathur & Rajeev Thanvi | 4:20 |
| 2. | "Jadu Mantar Hai" | Jai Narayan Tripathi | Rajeev Thanvi | 4:19 |
| 3. | "Ugh Mhara Sooraj" | Daan Singh | Suman Yadav | 4:39 |
| 4. | "Hiwade Gaanth Lagi" | Rajeev Thanvi | Rajeev Thanvi | 4:01 |
| 5. | "Bhobhar Theme" | Amit Ojha | Amit Ojha | 2:19 |
| Total length: | | | | 19:40 |

== See also ==
- Rajasthani cinema
- List of Rajasthani-language films
