= Bharkhama =

Rajasthani Film

- Directed by: S Sagar
- Written by: Jitendra Kumar Soni
- Based on: Bharkhama (Book)
- Produced by: Soni Sanwata Entertainment, PK Soni
- Starring: Anjali Raghav; Shravan Sagar; Rajveer Gurjar Bassi; Garima Kapoor; Sahil Chandel
- Cinematography: Abhay Annand
- Production company: Soni Sanwata Entertainment
- Release date: 6 September 2024 (India)
- Country: India
- Language: Rajasthani

Bharkhama is an Indian drama thriller film directed by S Sagar. It features an ensemble cast, including Shravan Sagar, Anjali Raghav, Rajveer Gurjar Bassi, Garima Kapoor, Sahil Chandel and Jitendra Chawdi.

The writer of the Rajasthani film 'Bharkhama', based on the Sahitya Akademi-awarded book 'Bharakhma' is Dr Jitendra Kumar Soni and he has received the Sahitya Akademi Yuva Puraskar.

This film based on the struggle of love was (previously) to be released on 5 July in 60 theatres across the country, was postponed till 6 September.

Also 'Bharkhama' received Special jury mention award at the Jaipur International Film Festival (JIFF).

== Cast ==
- Shravan Sagar Kalyan as Sagar
- Anjali Raghav as Nilofer
- Rajveer Gurjar Bassi as Sagar's Friend
- Sahil Chandel as Villain
- Garima Kapoor
- Jitendra Chawdi

== Awards and nominations ==
List of Awards and Nominations
Year	Award/Festival	Category	Recipient/Status	Details	Ref
2025	Rajasthan Film Festival (13th Edition)	Best Actor	Shravan Sagar (Winner)	Honored for his outstanding performance in the film.	
2025	Rajasthan Film Festival (13th Edition)	Best Writer	Dr. Jitendra Kumar Soni (Winner)	Recognized for the screenplay and story adaptation.	
2025	Jaipur International Film Festival	Special Jury Mention	Bharkhama (Winner)	Acknowledged for its cultural depth and contribution to Rajasthani cinema.	
2024	Rajasthan Cine Awards	Multiple	Nominated		

== Music ==
=== Rajasthani ===
Track listing
No.	Title	Lyrics	Singer(s)	Length
1.	"Manne Ho Gayo Hai Pyar"	Dhanraj Dadhich	Rini Chandra, Gourav Mali	03:11
2.	"Dil Disko Kare"	Dhanraj Dadhich	Ravindra Upadhyay	03:11
