= Shankhnaad =

Rajasthani Movie (2019)

- Directed by: Santosh Kranti Mishra
- Produced by: Ru-Aryan Entertainment; CA Anil Yadav; Promod Soni
- Starring: Kshitij Kumar; Shravan Sagar; Sanjana Sen; Sajal Goyal; Atharv Shrivastava
- Release date: 23 August 2019
- Country: India
- Language: Rajasthani

Shankhnaad is a 2019 Rajasthani languages Drama movie produced by CA Anil Yadav under Ru-Aryan Entertainment. The movie was directed by Santosh Kranti Mishra and Stars Kshitij Kumar, Sanjana Sen, Shravan Sagar, Sajal Goyal and Atharv Shrivastava as lead characters.

The film is inspired by the true events of Rajasthan, which is related to the struggle of shepherd blacksmiths. Muhurat short of 'Shankhnaad' was shot in Mansarovar, Jaipur.

During Rajasthan Film Festival 2022 in the Rajasthani cinema category, 'Shankhnaad' won the Best Film, the main hero of the film, Shravan Sagar, the Best Actor and Santosh K. Mishra was given the Best Writer Award.
