= Shivani Tanksale =

Indian actress

- Born: 29 October 1984 (age 41)
- Education: Green Lawns High School
- Occupation: Actress
- Years active: 2003-2020
- Spouse: Sumeet Vyas (m. 2010; div. 2017)
- Relatives: Vasant Sathe

Shivani Tanksale is a Mumbai-based actress who appears in Hindi films and advertisements.

== Personal life ==
She has been acting in plays since her school days at Green Lawns High School in Mumbai. She won several state and national level competitions. She is the granddaughter of politician Vasant Sathe. She was married to actor Sumeet Vyas. The couple later divorced in 2017.

== Career ==
=== Theatre ===
She was noticed by a theatre group called 'Ekjute' while acting in a college play. People thought of her as a vixen in college as she is insanely beautiful. She then formally started working with this Nadira Zaheer Babbar's group. Then 'Q Theatre Productions' called her and she did her first professional play,"The Lucky Ones".Some of her major plays are The President is Coming, "Love on the Brink", The Vagina Monologues, Ji Jaisi Aapki Marzi, Aisa Kehte Hain, All About Women, Bade Miyan Deewane, Abhi Na Jaao Chhod Kar and A Funny Thing Called Love. Apart from acting, she even directs plays and wants to be a full-time director one day. She has directed Namak Mirch and The Shehenshah of Azeemo with Sumeet Vyas, both produced by Akarsh Khurana's Akvarious. Namak Mirch was based on stories by Pakistani satirist Shaukat Thanvi, while the other one is an adaptation of The Wonderful Wizard of Oz. She also co-wrote Abhi Na Jaao Chhod Kar with Amal Uppal, which was adapted from It Had to Be You.

=== Film career ===
After working in various plays and advertisements, she acted in many Bollywood films. Her debut film was Escape From Taliban in 2003. Later on, she appeared in successful films, including Dil Kabaddi (2008), The President Is Coming (2009), The Dirty Picture (2011) and Talaash: The Answer Lies Within (2012). She was critically acclaimed for films like Inkaar (2013), Happy Ending (2014) and Zed Plus (2014). She was last seen in Ek Paheli Leela, which was released in April 2015.

=== Advertisements ===
She had a fascination for advertising and had even majored in the vocational subject at college. She has featured in over 40 commercials. Her first ad was with White Light Films for Annapurna Aromax in 2003. This was followed by an ad for Airtel Blackberry. Her big break arrived when White Light called her to audition for Cipla's emergency contraceptive 'i-pill' commercial, which was a huge success. This 2007 television advertisement of 38 seconds was part of a campaign that created awareness about the morning-after pills. It also made her a popular face in television commercials (TVCs). Max New York Life 'Sanju' advertisement is another noted work. She has worked with most of the leading production houses across brands.

== Filmography ==
=== Films ===
Year	Film	Role
2008	The Other End of the Line	Priya's Colleague
2008	Dil Kabaddi	Sush
2009	The President Is Coming	Ritu Johnson
2011	Shaitaan	Amy's Mother
2011	The Dirty Picture	Raadhika
2012	Talaash: The Answer Lies Within	Mira
2012	Rush	
2013	Inkaar	Nimmi
2013	Shree	Sheena
2014	Happy Ending	Gauri
2014	Zed Plus	Fauziya (Habib's Wife)
2015	Ek Paheli Leela	Radhika
2017	Manjha	Veena

=== Short film ===
Year	Short film	Director	Co-actor(s)
2009	Signalwaala Ladka	Pramod Pathak	
2012	Neighbours	Anand Tiwari	Ratnabali Bhattacharjee, Imraan Rasheed, Sumeet Vyas
2013	Neighbours: Part 1	Anand Tiwari	Sumeet Vyas
2013	Neighbours: Part 2	Kapil Chandela	Sumeet Vyas
2013	Oye Teri	Anand Tiwari	Sumeet Vyas
2014	Haircut	Anand Tiwari and Sumeet Vyas	Imran Rasheed

=== Television ===
Year	TV Serial	Role	Channel
1999-2000	Gubbare		Zee TV
2005	Time Bomb 9/11		Zee TV
2007	Sansani		Sahara Manoranjan
2013	24 (Indian TV series)	Divya Singhania Maurya	Colors TV

=== Web series ===
Year	Title	Role	Platform	Notes
2020	Marzi	Isha Chauhan	Voot	
2023	Taj: Divided by Blood	Bakht-Un-Nissa	ZEE5	
