= Ramkumar Singh =

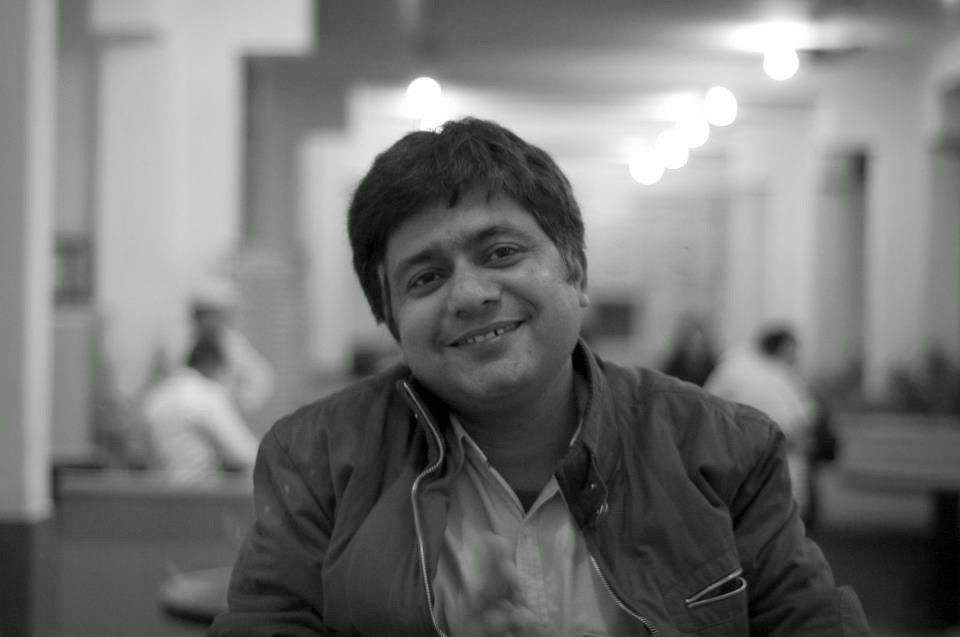
Ramkumar Singh

Ramkumar Singh is an Indian screenwriter, Hindi fiction writer, film lyricist, film critic and a columnist.

== Early life ==
He was born at Birania, Fatehpur Shekhawati (Rajasthan) in 1975.

== Career ==
His short stories have appeared in literary journals and translated into some other Indian languages. His short story collection Bhobhar tatha anya kahaniyaṅ was published by Lokayat Prakashan, Jaipur in 2012. For this book, he won the Rangey Rraghav Katha Samman, the highest award for fiction by Rajasthan Sahitya Academy.

His debut novel, the political satire Zed Plus, was published by Rajkamal Prakashan in 2015. He wrote the screenplay for the subsequent film Zed Plus by Chandraprakash Dwivedi that was based this novel. The Rajasthani Film Bhobhar, based on his story, was screened at various Indian and international film festivals.

He was nominated for best story in 21st LifeOk screen awards (for Zed Plus) and 1st Indo-Arab Bollywood Awards (AIBA2015).

He wrote dialogue for the film Sarkar 3.

He has written the lyrics for highly acclaimed film Anarkali of Arrah. His song ‘Dunaliya mein Jung’ was among the chartbusters of year 2017.
