= Nikita Rawal =

Indian actress

- Born: Mumbai, Maharashtra, India
- Education: Mithibai College
- Occupations: Dancer, actress, producer
- Years active: 2010–present

Nikita Rawal is an Indian dancer and actress.

Born and brought up in Mumbai, Maharashtra, she is known as an organizer and a performer in Bollywood and South Indian movies. Rawal has worked in movies such as Black & White with Anil Kapoor and Shefali Shah, Mr Hot Mr Kool and The Hero – Abhimanyu.

Ammaa Ki Boli, Garam Masala, starring Akshay Kumar and John Abhraham, Cute Kamina etc. She has also worked in Tollywood since 2012, and has received 8 awards. She has undertaken a government project depicting social issues, produced by Innocent Virus Films on NDTV. The video is based on spreading awareness about making the country drug free. In her upcoming film Roti Kapda and Romance, she plays the lead role alongside Arshad Warsi and Chunky Pandey.

== Filmography ==
Year	Title	Role	Language	Notes
2007	Mr. Hot Mr. Kool	Actress	Hindi	
2008	Black & White		Hindi	
2009	The Hero - Abhimanyu	Maria	Hindi	
2013	Ammaa Ki Boli	Item Song	Hindi	
