= Mukund Purohit =

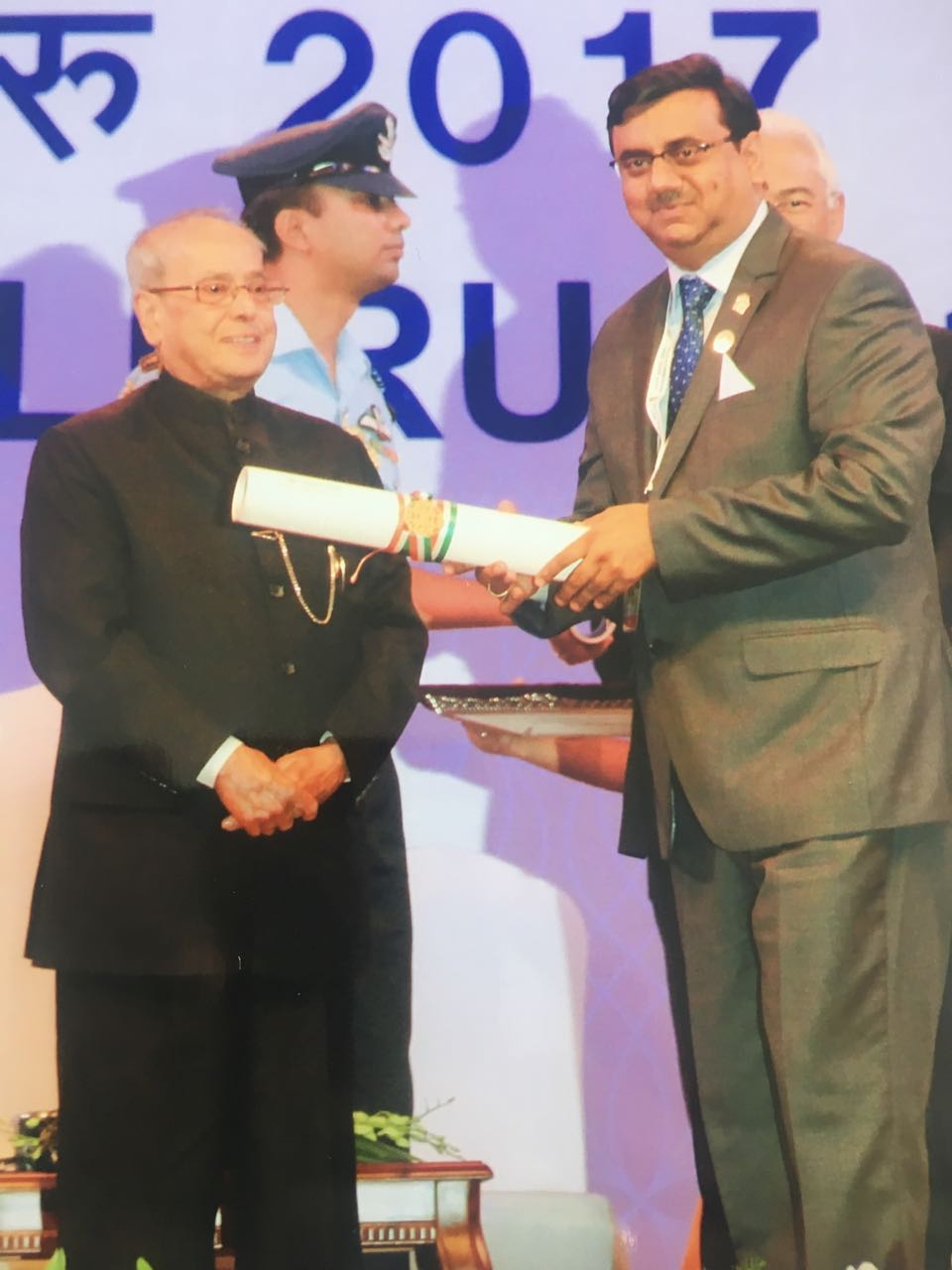
- Recipient of the Pravasi Bhartiya Samman Award

Personal details
- Born: 6 April 1971 (age 55)
- Awards: Pravasi Bharatiya Samman

Mukund Purohit is an Indo-Canadian entrepreneur. He is chairman and managing director of Neapolitan Pizza Limited.

== Career ==
He was President of the Gujarati Business Association Canada (GBA) 2003 to 2007. He worked as an advisor/consultant to the Ministry of Economy for the Government of Saskatchewan from 2011 to 2014, and as advisor/consultant to the Government of New Brunswick in 2014.

Purohit works towards developing bilateral relationship between India and Canada. He was the person because of whom the Canadian business delegation of Canadian politicians went to Gujarat for the first time and attended the Vibrant Gujarat Investor's summit beginning in 2009.

Purohit is the Director of Vcare Project Management Consultant Inc. (Canada). He is the Director of Panorama India, a non-profit umbrella organization working to unite Indo-Canadian cultural associations and groups.

He is a member of the Indo Canadian Business Chamber, Gujarat Council (India) and Indo Canada Chamber of Commerce (Canada). He is an Executive Fellow of the Asia Pacific Foundation of Canada and Vice President of My Home India. He is Co Chair of the Canada India Foundation, and International Commissioner of Hindustan Scouts and Guides.

Purohit is recipient of the Pravasi Bharatiya Samman from Pranab Mukherjee, then president of India.

The Government of Canada recognized Purohit's services by awarding him with the Queen Elizabeth II Diamond Jubilee Medal 2012. He received the Canada India Foundation's 2010 Gauravanto Gujarati Award, and Canada-India Friendship Medal from the House of Commons and Canada-India Parliamentary Friendship Group's 2012.

He was a producer of the Bollywood movie Zed Plus. Purohit is a social activist who raises funds for Kanya Kelvin Yojana, a literacy campaign for young girls deprived of basic education in Gujarat and other charities.
