= Shravan Sagar =

Rajasthani actor

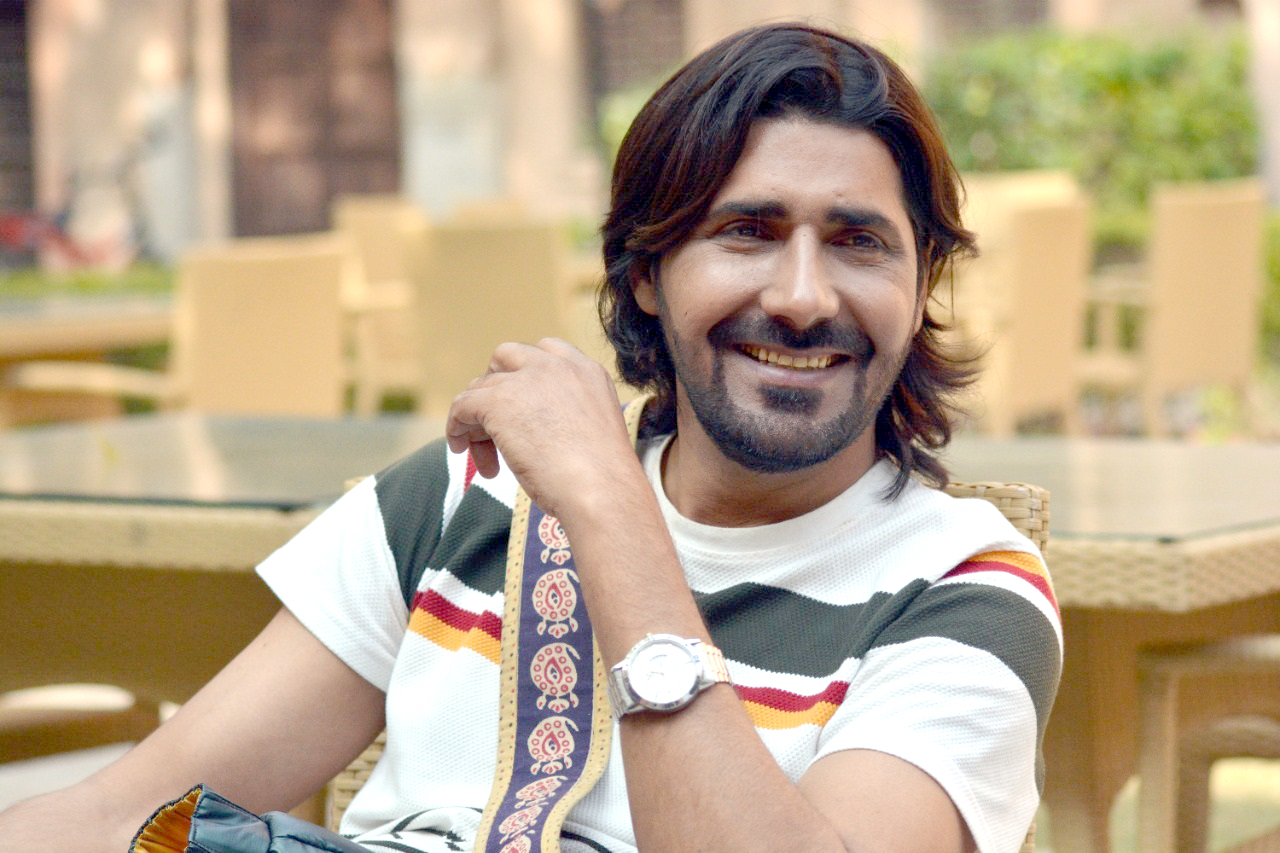
- Born: Jaipur, Rajasthan
- Occupation: actor
- Years active: 2007–present
- Known for: The Hero - Abhimanyu, Shankhnaad and Pagadi

Shravan Sagar aka Shravan Sagar Kalyan is an Indian film actor. He made his acting debut in the Rajasthani languages film Mharo Biro Hai Ghanshyam. He made his Bollywood debut with the film The Hero - Abhimanyu, in which he played the role of Inspector Abhimanyu. Sagar has received recognition for his contributions to the Rajasthani film industry.

At the Rajasthan Film Festival, Shravan Sagar received the award for Best Actor for his role in the film Shankhnaad. The film was also awarded Best Rajasthani Film. Additionally, the Rajasthani film Atta Sata, in which he played the role of Sagar, was recently released on the OTT platform Stage.

== Filmography ==
Year	Film	Character	Comments
2007	Mharo Biro Hai Ghanshyam	Shyam	
2009	The Hero - Abhimanyu	Inspector Abhimanyu	Bollywood Movie
2011	Patelan	Bhola	
2013	Dangal		
2014	Raju Rathod		
2016	Pagdi	Sagar	
2019	Shankhnaad	Birju	Best Rajasthani Film Award in RFF 2022
2022	Aata Sata	Sagar	Released on OTT
2023	Bahubali (Rajasthani)	Cameo as Maharana Pratap	
2023	Kesar Kasturi		Upcoming (2023)
2024	Bharkhamma	Police Officer Sagar	Released on 6 September

== Awards and nominations ==
=== Rajasthan Film Festival ===
- 2022 – Shankhnaad – Best Actor (Winner)
- 2025 – Bharkhama – Best Actor (Winner)
