= The Hero - Abhimanyu =

Indian crime thriller movie

- Directed by: Santosh Mishra
- Written by: Santosh Mishra; Santosh Nirmal
- Produced by: S.R. Choudhary
- Starring: Shravan Sagar; Hrishitaa Bhatt; Simran; Nikita Rawal; Raza Murad; Shakti Kapoor; Milind Gunaji; Razak Khan
- Cinematography: Thomas Xavier
- Edited by: Dilip Darak
- Production company: Ru-Aryans Film
- Release date: 12 December 2011
- Country: India
- Language: Hindi

The Hero - Abhimanyu is a 2009 Indian crime thriller movie directed by Santosh Mishra. It features an ensemble cast, including Shravan Sagar, Hrishitaa Bhatt, Simran, Nikita Rawal, Raza Murad, Shakti Kapoor, Milind Gunaji, Razak Khan, Santosh Mishra, and more.

The Hero - Abhimanyua focuses on the dangers that police officers face in the line of duty.
