= Zed Plus =

- Theatrical release poster
- Directed by: Chandraprakash Dwivedi
- Screenplay by: Chandraprakash Dwivedi; Ramkumar Singh
- Story by: Ramkumar Singh
- Produced by: Mukund Purohit; Mandira Kashyap
- Starring: Adil Hussain; Mona Singh; Mukesh Tiwari; Kulbhushan Kharbanda; Sanjay Mishra; Rahul Singh; Shivani Tanksale; K. K. Raina; Ekavali Khanna; Sanjeev Rathore; Dr. Anil Rastogi; Vinod Aacharya
- Cinematography: H.M. Ramchandran; Manoj Muntashir
- Music by: Sukhwinder Singh; Nayab
- Release date: 26 December 2014
- Country: India
- Language: Hindi

Zed Plus is a 2014 comedy-drama film directed by Chandraprakash Dwivedi. The film features Adil Hussain as one of many lead characters, including Rahul Singh, Mona Singh, Mukesh Tiwari, Kulbhushan Kharbanda, Sanjay Mishra, Shivani Tanksale, Vinod Aacharya, and Ekavali Khanna. The film was released on 26 December 2014

== Cast ==
- Aslam Puncturewala: Adil Hussain
- Hameeda (Aslam's Wife): Mona Singh
- Habib (Aslam's Neighbor): Mukesh Tiwari
- Hidayatulla: Sanjay Mishra
- Prime Minister : Kulbhushan Kharbanda
- Inspector Rajesh (Head of Zed Security): Rahul Singh
- Fauziya (Habib's Wife): Shivani Tanksale
- J Dixit (OSD to Prime Minister): K. K. Raina
- Saeeda (Aslam's love interest): Ekavali Khanna
- News Reporter: Sanjeev Rathore
- Chief Minister of Rajasthan: Dr. Anil Rastogi
- Assistant of Hidayatulla : Vinod Aacharya

== Soundtrack ==
Soundtrack
Song name	Singer	Composer	Lyricist
Fislan Hai	Sukhwinder Singh & Madhvi Srivastav	Sukhwinder Singh & Nayab	Manoj Muntashir
Ishq Ishq	Sukhwinder Singh & Madhvi Srivastav	Sukhwinder Singh & Nayab	Manoj Muntashir
Maula Pal Mein Palat De Baazi	Sukhwinder Singh	Sukhwinder Singh & Nayab	Manoj Muntashir
