= Bai Chali Sasariye =

- Directed by: Mohan Singh Rathod
- Produced by: Bharat Nahta
- Starring: Jagdeep; Lalita Pawar; Neelu Vaghela; Alankar; Upasana Singh
- Cinematography: Chandrakant N Desai
- Music by: O. P. Vyas
- Production company: Sundar Films
- Release date: 1988
- Running time: 151 minutes
- Country: India
- Language: Rajasthani

Bai Chali Sasariye (lit. 'Woman Goes to Her In-Laws') is a 1988 Indian Rajasthani-language drama film directed by Mohan Singh Rathod and produced by Bharat Nahta under Sundar Films. The film ran for 100 days and thus created a history in Rajasthan cinema. It was reported in 2004 that the film helped revive interest in films made in the Rajasthani language. It was remade in Telugu as Puttinti Pattu Cheera (1990), in Marathi as Maherchi Sadi (1991), in Kannada as Thavarumane Udugore (1991) and later in Hindi as Saajan Ka Ghar (1994) starring Juhi Chawla and Rishi Kapoor.

== Cast ==
- Upasana Singh as Lakshmi
- Gyan Shivpuri as Amar, Lakshmi's husband
- Lalita Pawar as Amar's mother and Lakshmi's mother-in-law
- Neelu Vaghela as Bhomlee
- Alankar Joshi as Suraj, Lakshmi's brother and Bhomlee's love interest
- Ramesh Tiwari as Seth Umed Ram, Lakshmi and Suraj's father
- Devyani Thakkar as Lakshmi's stepmother and Suraj's mother
- Manik Irani as Kaaliya
- Jagdeep as Comedian

== Songs ==
All songs of this film were composed by O. P. Vyas. They were very popular, the title song "Choti See Umar"/"Bai Chali Sasariye" is based on the Rajasthani folk song "Chhoti Si Umar" (lit. 'Tender Age') which has previously been recorded by classical singers such as Shobha Gurtu, the folk song was also later used as the opening theme of the popular Indian TV serial Balika Vadhu (2008-2016) on Colors TV. Songs of the film include:

All lyrics are written by Diwakar and Kundan Kishore.

No.	Title	Singer(s)	Length
1.	"Roopiyo To Le Main"	Mahendra Kapoor, Anupama Deshpande, Jaspal Singh	3:53
2.	"Banna Re Bagan Mein"	Alka Yagnik, Suresh Wadkar, Saraswati Devi Dhandhra	4:23
3.	"Rang Rasiya Re"	Jaspal Singh, Suresh Wadkar, Anupama Deshpande, Alka Yagnik	4:59
4.	"Choti See Umar/Bai Chali Sasariye" (title track)	Saraswati Devi Dhandra, Anuradha Paudwal, Suresh Wadkar, Shabbir Kumar, Saathi	7:15
5.	"Beera Re"	Alka Yagnik, Anuradha Paudwal, Suresh Wadkar	5:36
6.	"Helo Maaro Sunle"	Anuradha Paudwal, Jayshree Shivram, Shabbir Kumar	3:12
7.	"Talriya Maagriya Re"	Anuradha Paudwal	5:03
8.	"Lyade Re Lyade"	Anuradha Paudwal, Mahendra Kapoor, Jaspal Singh	3:12
9.	"Ooncho Ooncho Ghaghro"	Anuradha Paudwal, Alka Yagnik	4:40

== See also ==
- List of Rajasthani-language films
