= Pagdi =

Rajasthani Movie

Pagdi is a 2016 Rajasthani-language movie directed by Nishant Bhardwaj, featuring Shravan Sagar and Ruhi Chaturvedi in lead roles.

== Details ==
The film revolves around the issue of human trafficking and aims to raise public awareness about it.

Former Jhunjhunu MP Santosh Ahlawat plays the lead character in the film. Shravan Sagar is the film's producer, and Union Road and Transport Minister Nitin Gadkari recently released the film's trailer.

The movie was shot in the Neem-Ka-Thana area of Sikar district, and Yudhishthir Bhati from Bikaner has played the role of the villain in the film.
