= O. P. Vyas =

O.P.Vyas
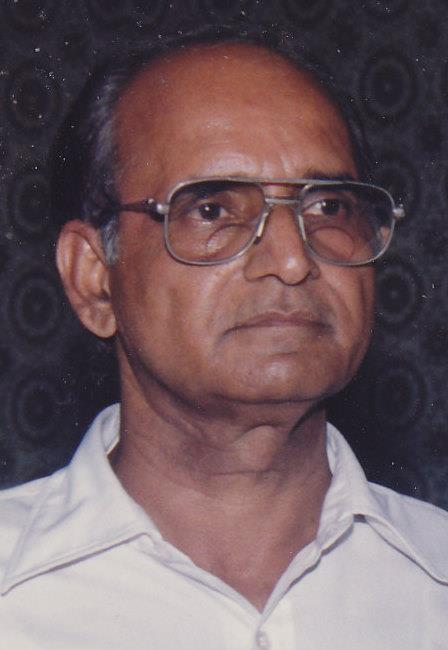

Background information
- Born: Om Prakash Vyas; 4 January 1938; Jodhpur, Rajputana Agency, British India
- Died: 5 June 2015 (aged 77) Jodhpur, Rajasthan, India
- Occupations: Composer, music director, lyricist, musician, singer, poet
- Years active: 1965–2015

Om Prakash Vyas (4 January 1938 – 5 June 2015) was an Indian lyricist, musician, singer and poet from Rajasthan. He wrote primarily in the Rajasthani language and focused on themes of Rajasthani culture.

He received the Sangeet Purodha Award from the Rajasthan Sangeet Natak Academy for his incorporation of folk music into his compositions.

== Early life ==
Vyas was born on 4 January 1938 to Amarkunwar and Ramchandra Vyas in Jodhpur, Rajasthan State, the second of five children. His father exposed him to the traditional music of Rajasthan. He studied at Sumer Pushtikar High School before becoming a teacher for the Rajasthan Educational Department.

While working as a teacher he pursued a Bachelor of Arts from Rajputana University. He also participated in state and national level youth festivals, preferring to perform patriotic songs and folk songs from Rajasthan. After graduating, he moved to Mumbai to pursue a further education in the arts at the J. J. School of Arts. He returned to Jodhpur in 1965 and resumed work as a teacher.

In 1972 he staged a musical show in Jodhpur called O. P. Vyas Nite, which featured local musicians and singers. He began composing music for films in 1973; films on which he worked include Meera Bai (1973), Trishla Ka Lal (1974), Filmi Duniya Filmy Log (1974), Veer Tejaji (1982), Savaniye Ree Teej (1984), and Bai Chali Sasariye.

He made recordings of several of his songs in 1975 for His Master's Voice. In 1977 he launched his own production company, Sunrise Records, working with singers such as A. K. Vyas and Sumitra Laheri. He also worked with Usha Mangeshkar, Alka Yagnik, Kavita Krishnamurty, Sadhna Sargam and Udit Narayan.

In 1993 he recorded sixteen albums of Rajasthani folk songs for Gulshan Kumar, the owner of Super Cassettes Industries T-Series. Anuradha Paudwal, Sonu Nigam, Agam Nigam, Utra Kelkar and Kavita Paudwal sang on the albums.

== Discography ==
| Year | Album title |
|---|---|
| 1993 | Bahah Masa (in three parts) |
| 1994 | Bhakti Ro Maarg |
| 1995 | Piya Ghar Aa Re |
| 1995 | Banna Banni |
| 1996 | Jai Shree Nath |
| 1996 | Sanwariya Ji |
| 1997 | Kela Devi |
| 1998 | Gangor |
| 1998 | Santoshi Mata |
| 1998 | Geeto Ro Helo |
