= Mero Badloo =

- Mero Badloo Poster
- Directed by: Mahendra Gaur
- Produced by: Mahendra Gaur
- Starring: Mahendra Gaur Gaurav Pareek; Teena Rathore; Swati Jaiswal; Murarilal Pareek
- Release date: 19 June 2015
- Countries: Rajasthan, India
- Language: Rajasthani

Mero Badloo (English: My Revenge) is a Rajasthani action/drama film produced and directed by Mahendra Gaur. The film was released on 19 June 2015. The film stars Mahendra Gaur with Teena Rathore, Swati Jaiswal and Murarilal Pareek, Gaurav Pareek in supporting roles.

== Summary ==
Mero Badloo film is based on portrays a drug mafia in Rajasthan. in this movie, Mahendra Gaur Is the lead actor and director. this movie was launched only in Rajasthan cinemas.

== Cast ==
- Mahendra Gaur – Shiva
- Murari Lal Pareek – Parvati
- Gaurav Pareek – Guri
- Swati Jaiswal – Gauri
- HISAM KHAN – TM
- Pankai Punia – Bhinvraj
- Rudra Gaur – Child Artist
- Murari Lal Pareek – chattur
- Gopal Prasad – Balveer

== Soundtrack ==
#	Title	Singer(s)
1	"Naina Ri Boli "	Goldie Sohel, Arpita Chakraborty, Raju Ugani
2	"Jash Hai Jeet Ko "	Goldie Sohel, Gaurav Pareek
3	"Paap Ri Aandhi Re "	Mainak M-Sonic
4	"Dekha to na Jane (Bihu Song) "	Zublee Baruah, Goldie Sohel
5	"Mero Badlo (Title Song)"	Mahendra Gaur, Gaurav Pareek
