= Jitendra Kumar Soni =

Indian civil servant (born 1981)

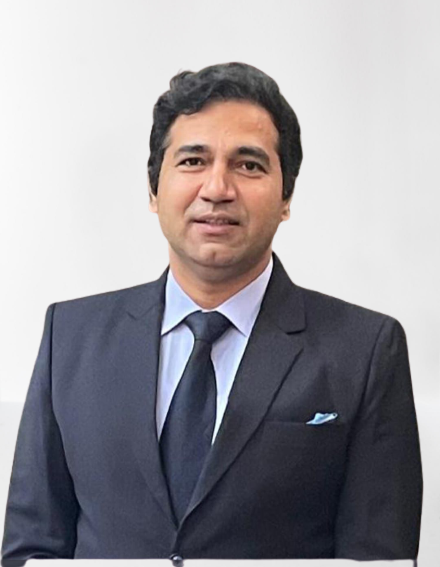
- Born: 29 November 1981 (age 44); Hanumangarh, India
- Education: PhD, MA political science
- Occupations: IAS, author, novelist
- Spouse: Anjali Soni
- Writing career
- Period: 2010 to present
- Genres: Short stories, Travelogue, Poetry
- Notable works: Yadavri, Rankhaar, ADIOS, Regmal, Bharkhama, Okuhepa
- Notable awards: Sahitya Akademi Award 2025, Sahitya Akademi Yuva Puraskar 2016 Jeevan Raksha Padak, Rashtrapati Nagrik Raksha Padak

Jitendra Kumar Soni (29 November 1981) is an Indian civil servant born in Dhannasar village of Hanumangarh District in Rajasthan .He is a Rajasthani and Hindi writer and translator.

== Life and career ==
=== Life ===
Soni obtained an M.A. in political science, philosophy and public policy and obtained his PhD in political science from Rajasthan University, Jaipur.

He writes in multiple languages including Hindi, Punjabi, and Rajasthani. He has published more than 10 novels, short stories, and other collections. He was awarded the Sahitya Akademi Award 2025" for his Rajasthani short story collection Bharkhama announced by Sahitya Akademi and Sahitya Academy Yuva Puruskar in 2016 for his work Rankhaar. He received the civilian lifesaving award Jeevan Raksha Padak for saving 8 lives. He has been selected in top 10 IAS officers by The Better India.

=== Career/ Posting ===
- Collector Jalore, Dr. Soni was district collector for Jalore district in Rajasthan in 2014, and initiated a programme for sanitation, education and health in the district through community involvement.
- By 2016, Dr. Soni had moved to Jhalawar district, where he served as collector and district magistrate until December 2018. Soni initiated a campaign to improve access for disabled people in Jhalawar district; ramps and railings were made mandatory in new government buildings; in December 2016, he said that the district planned to start kiosks for disabled people in old government buildings where there was insufficient space for improving disabled access.
- In December 2018, Dr. Soni was appointed project director for the Rajasthan Urban Infrastructure Development Project (RUIDP) of the Government of Rajasthan.
- It was announced on 4 July 2020, that he had been appointed the next collector of Nagaur district in Rajasthan. After posting as Nagaur district District collector, Dr. Soni initiated ‘Abhiyaan Ujaas’ to electrify nearly 1000 non-electrified government schools with help of local donators and CSR funds. This model is being replicated in whole Rajasthan as per directions of Chief Minister, Rajasthan to electrify 11,154 government schools of Rajasthan. Dr. Soni took an initiative "Rasta Kholo Abhiyaan" to remove encroachments and provide ways to farmers to access their agricultural lands. More than four thousands such ways or Rasta were made accessible, encroachment free and recorded. Dr. Soni started special campaign to make educational institutes tobacco free. This was appreciated by the Chief Minister and decision was made to roll it out in the whole state.
- On 7 January 2022, Abhiyaan Silicosis Care of Nagaur district has been awarded the 24th National e-Governance Award in the category of 'Excellence in Government Process Re-engineering for Digital Transformation'. This award was presented to District Collector Dr. Jitendra Kumar Soni and his team in the 24th National Conference held in Hyderabad.
- It was announced on 16 January 2022, that he had been appointed as Mission Director, National Health Mission (NHM) and Ex-Officio Joint Secretary to Government, Medical, Health and Family Welfare Department, Rajasthan.
- It was announced on 4 July 2022, that he had been appointed the next collector of Alwar district in Rajasthan.
- It was announced on 15 May 2023, that he had been appointed Mission Director National Health Mission in Rajasthan along with Ex-Officio Special Secretary to Government, Medical, Health and Family Welfare Department, Rajasthan and Ex-Officio Trauma Commissioner, Rajasthan, Jaipur
- Dr. Jitendra Kumar Soni, a 2010-batch IAS officer, was appointed as the Collector and District Magistrate of Jaipur on 5 September 2024. He took charge the following day, after a successful tenure as Mission Director of the National Health Mission in Rajasthan. Known for his efficient and people-centric administrative style, his new role places him in charge of the state capital, where he aims to strengthen good governance, improve public services, and enhance citizen engagement through active fieldwork and technology-driven initiatives.
- Dr. Jitendra Kumar Soni, served as the District Collector of Jaipur until March 2026. Following the state government's transfer order issued on 31 March 2026, he was appointed as Secretary to the Chief Minister.

== Awards / Achievements ==
=== Awards ===
- Dr. Soni has been awarded with "Rastrapati Nagrik Suraksha Padak" on August 15, 2022.
- Dr. Soni has been awarded with "Uttam Jeevan Raksha Padak" announced by Hon'ble President of India for saving 8 lives.
- Dr. Soni has been awarded with "Sahitya Academy Yuva Puruskar 2016" announced by Sahitya Academy. Press Information Bureau JagranJosh News Sify News
- Dr. Soni has been awarded with "Sahitya Akademi Award 2025" for his Rajasthani short story collection Bharkhama announced by Sahitya Akademi.

== Literary works ==
=== Books ===
- Lagmat- Rajasthani Diary (ISBN 93-6719-438-2), National Book Trust, INDIA
- Okuhepa (ISBN 9789357437318 OKHUEPA), Travelogue
- Bharkhama (ISBN 9789355360229), Rajasthani Kahani Sangrah
- Regmal (ISBN 9789388820356 Regmal (रेगमाल)), Hindi Poetry Collection
- Rankhaar (ISBN 9789384979867), Rajasthani Poetry
- ADIOS (ISBN 9789388820110), Dhai Aakhar Ki Dhai Kahaniyan, Hindi Short stories]
- Yadavri (ISBN 9789381480885), Diary
- Umeedon Ke Chirag (ISBN 8188761184) Hindi Poetry Collection

=== Books edited ===
- 48 Kadam
- Bhanai Ro Marag: Gandhi Ji Ra Bhashan Ar Lekh
- Kavita Paraspar (ISBN 9789388820004), poetry collection
- Shabdon Ki Seep, poetry collection

=== Books translated ===
- म्हारे पांति रा पाना (ISBN 9789382452447), Rajasthani translation of Punjabi book by Haribhajan Singh Renu
- देहरा माय आज ही उगै है आपन रूंख (ISBN 9788126046911), Rajasthani translation of English short stories by Ruskin Bond
- Nirwana (ISBN 9788126053780), Hindi translation of Punjabi novel written by Manmohan Singh

== See also ==
- Saini, Sachin (2 August 2017). "Mobile schools for nomadic tribes in Rajasthan's Jhalawar". Hindustan Times.
