= Tamanna House =

- Created by: Meteror Films
- Written by: Mohan Azaad
- Directed by: Mohan Azaad
- Starring: see below
- Opening theme: "Tamanna House" by ??
- Country of origin: India
- Original language: Hindi

Production
- Producer: Dinesh Bansal
- Running time: approx. 23 minutes

Original release
- Network: Zee TV
- Release: 27 June 2004

Tamanna House is a thriller television series that aired on Zee TV channel, every Sunday to Wednesday at 10pm IST. The series is a similar version of the popular mysteries of Agatha Christie's novels.

== Synopsis ==
The story revolves around the life of a couple: Tamanna & Dilip, who decide to throw a bizarre party to celebrate their impending divorce. Hence, the couple organizes a game for the guests to play, and whoever wins the game will get 5 crore (50 million rupees) from the person who loses the divorce case. The conflict arises, when Tamanna sets up some rules for the party, such as the number of guests allowed in the party would be 10, Dilip can only invite one person, and that person will invite someone else, & so on, and if Dilip happens to invite a female than that female has to invite a male. At first Dilip doesn't like his wife's idea, but he decides to cope with her rules, since the bet is worth 5 crore rupees.

After going through all the rules & regulations, the time for the party arrives at 10pm. The couple gets excited, when they see their guests, but get upset because they invited rich, high class guests, and the guests that arrived at the party happens to be low class people, such as one of the guest is a thief & the other one is bar dancer. But they decide to go with the gang, but than there is another problem arises, as according to the bet the number of guest's Tamanna & Dilip invited was 10, but 11 guests showed up. Henceforth, one of the guest's has to go. On the other hand, while the game begins, a murder is committed and the party gets transformed into a murder mystery. Now, the guests are desperate to know who committed the murder?

== Cast ==
- Ruby Bhatia ... Tamanna
- Jas Arora ... Dilip
- Virendra Saxena
- Donny Kapoor
- Upasana Singh
- Satya
- Pooja Garg
- Shivam Shetty
- Harjeet Walia
- Vaishali Nazarath
- Hemant Pandey
- Phalguni Parikh
- Vinay Pathak
