= Dhood =

2026 Rajasthani-language psychological thriller film

- Directed by: Anand Singh Chouhan
- Written by: Anand Singh Chouhan
- Starring: Yashpal Sharma; Alka Amin; Bhawani Singh Chouhan; Vivek Pareek; Praveen Choudhary; Vanikki Tyagi
- Music by: Mehul Surti
- Production company: Soul of Desert Productions
- Distributed by: Miraj Cinemas
- Release date: 23 October 2026
- Country: India
- Language: Rajasthani

Dhood (also known as Dhood (SandStorm)) is an Indian Rajasthani-language psychological thriller film written and directed by Anand Singh Chouhan. Set in Rajasthan during the early 1990s, the film stars Yashpal Sharma, Alka Amin, Bhawani Singh Chouhan, Vivek Pareek, Praveen Choudhary and Vanikki Tyagi. The film was released on 23 October 2026.

== Plot ==
Set in Rajasthan in the 1990s, the film follows an isolated family living in the Thar Desert. Conflicts within the family develop into a tense domestic situation, with the story exploring themes of greed, power, family lineage and desperation.

== Cast ==
- Yashpal Sharma
- Alka Amin
- Bhawani Singh Chouhan
- Vivek Pareek
- Praveen Choudhary
- Vanikki Tyagi

== Production ==
Dhood is written and directed by Anand Singh Chouhan. The film was produced by Soul of Desert Productions in association with Studio Ainak. It is presented by Kalam Academy and Samar Jain.

The film's narrative draws on the cultural landscape of Rajasthan and combines family drama with psychological thriller elements. According to published reports, the project was conceived to bring a story rooted in Rajasthan to a wider audience.

== Music ==
The film's music is composed by Mehul Surti.

== Release ==
It was released theatrically across India on 23 October 2026, with Miraj Cinemas handling distribution.
