= Rajasthan Film Festival =

Indian film festival

Rajasthan Film Festival - RFF
- Current: 13th RFF Awards
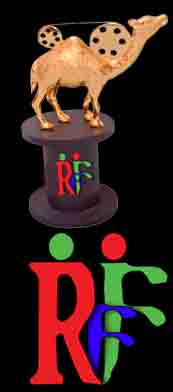
- The Official RFF Trophy
- Awarded for: Award for Excellence in Cinematic Achievements for Regional Cinema of India
- Country: India
- First award: 2013
- Website: https://www.rajasthanfilmfestival.com/

Television/radio coverage
- Produced by: Kseries

The Rajasthan Film Festival Award ceremony (also known as the RFF Awards) is a set of awards presented annually to honour both artistic and technical excellence of artistes in Rajasthani cinema as well as in other Regional Cinema of India. 12th Edition of Rajasthan film festival award ceremony was held on 28th September, 2024 at Deep Smriti Auditorium, Jaipur. Arbaaz Khan and Smita Bansal hosted the award ceremony. The theme for the festival was Unity in diversity and 24 awards were awarded in 2 broad categories: for films produced in Rajasthan and for films produced in other regions of India (except Rajasthan). In order to honour people who have been dedicated to the industry, a Lifetime Achievement Award is also presented at the ceremony.

== History ==
The 12th edition of the regional award ceremony took place on September 28, 2024, at the Deep Smriti Auditorium in Jaipur. The event was hosted by Arbaaz Khan and Smita Bansal. Notably, the Lifetime Achievement Award was presented to Ahmed and Mohammed Hussain. Director and actor Puneet Issar also graced the ceremony with his presence.

The awards were instituted in 2013. The 11th award ceremony was held on 30 September 2023 at Deep Smriti Auditorium. Aftab Shivdasani and Neha Dhupia did the hosting at the award night and Lifetime Achievement Award was given to Gulshan Grover. Govinda attended the festival as the chief guest.

The 10th edition of the RFF award ceremony was held from 22 September 2022 to 24 September 2022 at Maan Place, Jaipur. Tusshar Kapoor and Mahima Chaudhry were the hosts of the evening with Film Critic Komal Nahta and lifetime Achievement Award was given to Sanjay Mishra.

The 9th and 8th edition of Rajasthan Film Festival was not held due to global pandemic of COVID 19.

The 7th edition of the award ceremony was organized for 3 Days (26 September to 28 September 2019) at Maan Palace, in Jaipur. Shreyas Talpade was the host of the award night. Other prominent celebrities at the ceremony included Shakti Kapoor, Satish Kaushik, Rajesh Puri, Komal Nahta, Aniruddh Dave, Neha Shree, Aniruddh Singh among others. The eighth and ninth edition of the award ceremony were cancelled due to government-imposed covid restrictions.

The 2018 event was organized for 5 Days (25 to 29 September 2018) at Maan Palace, in Jaipur. Vatsal Seth was the host of the award night and the celebrities Jeetendra Kapoor, Mithoon Sharma, Neelu Vaghela, Gajendra Chauhan, Anirudh Dave and Sara Khan made their presence. In 2017, the ceremony was held at Deep Smriti Auditorium, on 14 to 16 September 2017.

The first awards were presented in 2013 at Rajasthan, India. From then onwards, the awards are held at various locations of Jaipur.

Sanjana Sharma is the founder of Rajasthan Film Festival. In its 6th edition (2018), the RRF has organized this event for 5 days. The event was started with theater competition held on 25–27 September. On 28 September, inter college dance competition was organize where several people from Rajasthani Film Industry shared their thoughts about Rajasthan cinema and on the last day of event (29 September), awards were given to the various categories by RFF.

== Award ceremonies ==
The following is a listing of all Rajasthan Film Festival Awards ceremonies since 2013

Year	Date	Best Film	Host	Venue	City	Lifetime Achievement Award	Chief Guest
2013	28 September 2013	Bhobhar (Rajasthani); Us Disha Mai (Hindi)	RJ Moniya; Anchor Kabeer; Anchor Mann	Deep Smriti Auditorium Jaipur	Jaipur	MohanSingh Rathore; Kshitiz Kumar; Ramesh Tiwari; Neelu Vaghela; Gulabo Sapera O.P. Vyas; Veena Cassettes; Modern Cassettes	Dr.Mahesh Joshi
2014	20 September 2014	Kahani Ek Devi Ki	Ashok Banthia Anchor Kabeer	Deep Smriti Auditorium Jaipur	Jaipur	Komal Nahta ( Nahta Family ) Shyam Sunder Jalani	T. P. Aggarwal
2015	26 September 2015	Raju Rathod	Anup Soni Arun Bakshi Meena Nahta RJ Mohit Ravinder Upadhyay	Jaipur Bagh	Jaipur	Mohan Kataria	Subhash Ghai Rajyavardhan Singh Rathore
2016	24 September 2016	Hivade Me Fute Laadu	Aman Verma RJ Mohit	Maan Palace	Jaipur	Ikram Rajasthani	Javed Akhtar
2017	16 September 2017	Nani Bai Ro Mayro	Aman Verma Mahendra Gaur Anirudh Dave Rohit Purohit Himanshu Soni RJ Mohit	Deep Smriti Auditorium Jaipur	Jaipur	Pandit Vishwa Mohan Bhatt	Jaiprakash Chouksey
2018	25 to 29 September 2018	Birani Sardar	Vatsal Seth	Maan Palace	Jaipur	Bharat Nahta	Jeetendra Kapoor Mithun Sharma Neelu Vaghela
2019	28 September 2019	Veerangana (In Rajasthani Cinema) Qismat (In Other Regional Cinema)	Shreyas Talpade	Maan Palace	Jaipur	Shakti Kapoor	Komal Nahta Satish Kaushik Rajesh Puri Aniruddh Dave
2020	Not held		The Ceremonies Cancelled due to COVID-19 pandemic.				
2021	Not held		The Ceremonies Cancelled due to COVID-19 pandemic.				
2022	24 September 2022	Shankhnaad (In Rajasthani Films) Hellaro (In Other Regional Films)	Tusshar Kapoor Komal Nahta Mahima Chaudhry	Maan Palace	Jaipur	Sanjay Mishra (actor)	
2023	30 September 2023	Subhagi (In Rajasthani Films) Ayothi (In Other Regional Films)	Aftab Shivdasani & Neha Dhupia	Deep Smriti Auditorium Jaipur	Jaipur	Gulshan Grover	Govinda
2024	28 September 2024	Bhawani (In Rajasthani Films) Aattam (In Other Regional Films)	Arbaaz Khan, Smita Bansal & Mahendra Gaur	Deep Smriti Auditorium Jaipur	Jaipur	Ahmed and Mohammed Hussain	
2025	20 September 2025	Hukum (In Rajasthani Films) Saala (film) (In Other Regional Films)	Chunky Panday, Pooja Hegde, Sumit Vyas	Deep Smriti Auditorium Jaipur	Jaipur	Raza Murad and Dilip Sen	

== Awards ==
=== Rajasthani Film ( Category-A) ===
- Best Director
- Best Writer
- Best Cinematographer
- Best Actor in Leading Role
- Best Actress in Leading Role
- Best Negative Performance
- Best Supporting Performance
- Best Music Director
- Best lyrics Writer
- Best Singer (Male)
- Best Singer (Female)
- Best Movie

=== Other Regional Film ( Category-B) ===
- Best Director
- Best Writer
- Best Cinematographer
- Best Actor in Leading Role
- Best Actress in Leading Role
- Best Negative Performance
- Best Supporting Performance
- Best Music Director
- Best lyrics Writer
- Best Singer (Male)
- Best Singer (Female)
- Best Movie

=== Special Award ===
- Life Time Achievement

=== Jury Members ===
S. No.	Name of Jury	Industry
1	Naresh Malhotra	Film Director
2	Indrajit Bansal	DOP
3	Pt. Vishwa Mohan Bhatt	Music
4	Deepak Tijori	Actor & Director
5	Sanjay Puran Singh	Director

== See also ==
- 1st Award Show (Rajasthan Film Festival)
