= Cinema of Rajasthan =

The cinema of Rajasthan refers to films produced in Rajasthan in north-western India. These films are produced in various regional and tribal languages including Rajasthani and its varieties such as Mewari, Marwari, Hadoti etc.

== Overview ==
The first Rajasthani movie was Nazrana, a Marwari film directed by G. P. Kapoor and released in 1942. Babasa Ri Ladli, produced by B. K. Adarsh, was released in 1961 and has been described as the first hit Rajasthani movie.

The 1983 film Mhari Pyri Channana by producer and director Jatinkumar Agarrwal was the first Silver jubilee film in Rajasthani.

Between 1987 and 1995 a number of Rajasthani films [Rajjywood] were produced, including the musical Bai Chali Sasariye from 1988, which was reported to be the only successful Rajasthani-language film production in the 1980s and 1990s.

Since the mid-1990s, the number of films produced in Rajasthan has been low, for reasons including lack of promotion and poor production quality.

Film producers in Rajasthani cinema [Rajjywood] include B. K. Adarsh, Ram Raj Nahta, Bharat Nahta, Bhanu Prakash Rathi, and Ajai Chowdhary, and directors include Nawal Mathur of Jodhpur, Mohan Singh Rathor, Mohan Kataria, Ajit Singh, and Bhanu Prakash Rathi. Neelu Vaghela, Gajendra S. Shrotriya, and Jatinkumar Agarrwal have been both producers and directors.

To encourage the production of Rajasthani movies, a tax holiday for cinemas in towns and cities with fewer than 100,000 inhabitants was announced in the 2008 budget of the Rajasthani Government, and the entertainment tax was lowered.

== See also ==
- List of Rajasthani language films
- List of films shot in Rajasthan
