= Aashiqui 2 (soundtrack) =

- Soundtrack cover

Soundtrack album by Jeet Gannguli, Mithoon and Ankit Tiwari
- Released: 3 April 2013
- Recorded: 2013
- Genre: Filmi
- Length: 50:40
- Language: Hindi
- Label: T-Series
- Producer: Bhushan Kumar

Jeet Gannguli chronology
Rocky (2013)	Aashiqui 2 (2013)	Boss: Born to Rule (2013)

Mithoon chronology
3G (2013)	Aashiqui 2 (2013)	Yaariyan (2014)

Ankit Tiwari chronology
Saheb Biwi Aur Gangster (2011)	Aashiqui 2 (2013)	Samrat & Co. (2014)

Singles from Aashiqui 2
- 1. "Tum Hi Ho" Released: 23 March 2013

Aashiqui 2 is the soundtrack to the 2013 Indian Hindi-language romantic musical drama film of the same name, directed by Mohit Suri and starring Aditya Roy Kapoor and Shraddha Kapoor in the lead roles. The album was produced by Bhushan Kumar under the T-Series label. The enormous success of multi composer setup has been followed in many films.

The songs of the film were mostly composed by Jeet Gannguli, although Mithoon and Ankit Tiwari composed two songs each (including both versions) as guest composers. Irshad Kamil wrote lyrics for most of songs on the album. Sandeep Nath wrote both versions of "Sunn Raha Hai", while Mithoon wrote "Tum Hi Ho" and Sanjay Masoom wrote "Bhula Dena". Arijit Singh sang six of the songs on the album. Jeet Gannguli reused the tune from his own Bengali composition "Mon Hariye Beghorey" for "Milne Hai Mujhse Aayi" and "Aaj Tomai Niye Shuru Holo Notun Jibon" for "Hum Mar Jayenge".

== Creation ==
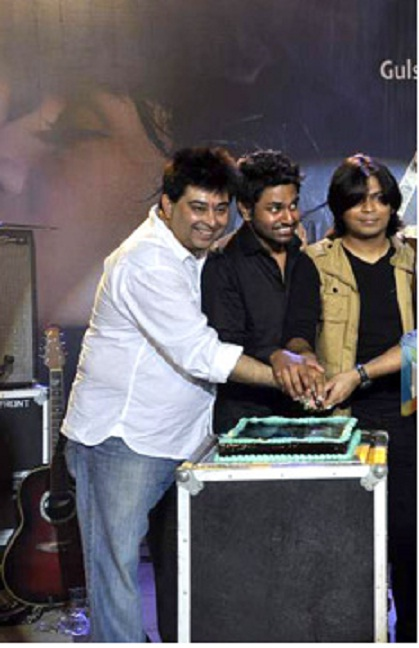
Jeet Gannguli (left) at an event for Aashiqui 2 music concert

Mohit Suri revealed that the soundtrack for Aashiqui 2 was specifically made for the film, as opposed to Aashiqui, where T-Series already had pre-existing music by Nadeem–Shravan, which they then incorporated in the film.

The song Tum Hi Ho had already been recorded by Mithoon two years before its original release through Arijit's voice. The song became the most popular listener's choice song of the year 2013 and an ever-chanting love anthem for everyone.

The song "Sunn Raha Hai" was rendered in two different (electric rock and semi -classical) styles as per the demand of the film where a rich and popular singer sings with modern and sophisticated instruments and a poor bar singer sings with normal instruments. The composer Ankit Tiwari was appreciated for recruiting Shreya Ghoshal's voice for the female version of the song.

The song "Hum Mar Jayenge" uses flute, which Bollywood Hungama in their review appreciated."Chahun Main Yaa Na" is a "coming-up love" romantic song which not only remarked the two persons, composer Jeet Gannguli and singer Palak Muchhal who come into the limelight but also became quite contagious amongst the youngsters of those time. The song "Milne Hai Mujhse Aayi" has used guitars that lean towards heavy rock genre. The song "Aashan Nahi Yahaan" has a universal message of love in its lyrics. "Bhula Dena" depicted the practical ending of the two lovers but which would start once again in the coming births as their love was unknowingly infinite in its cause.

The whole album though was based on love except for the youth-appealing song "Sunn Raha Hai", the quality and freshness was splendidly unmatchable from other hit albums like Yeh Jawaani Hai Deewani, Chennai Express, Kai Po Che, Bhaag Milkha Bhaag, Phata Poster Nikla Hero, Raanjhanaa, Dhoom 3 and Goliyon Ki Raasleela Ram-Leela, of that year.

== Critical reception ==
Aashiqui 2's soundtrack received acclaim from music critics, who praised the songs "Tum Hi Ho" and both versions of "Sunn Raha Hai". The Times of India rated the album 5 out of 5 stars, and wrote, "Aashiqui 2 tries, and succeeds to some extent in matching the repeat-values freshness and allure of the original. And while it is unfair to compare a sequel to the original, it needs to be said that each should be seen for its own merit."

Koimoi rated the album 3 out of 5, and said, "Aashiqui 2 is an album that had set its heart in the right place and wanted to accomplish what Aashiqui did musically. It has the ingredients in place though at times one gets an impression that the recipe could have been a tad better. One waits to see if the soundtrack would indeed turn out to be memorable for a lifetime, more so since Bhatts had musically created a high standard with Aashiqui."

== Track listing ==
Track listing
No.	Title	Lyrics	Music	Singer(s)	Length
1.	"Tum Hi Ho"	Mithoon	Mithoon	Arijit Singh	4:22
2.	"Sunn Raha Hai" (Male Version)	Sandeep Nath	Ankit Tiwari	Ankit Tiwari	6:30
3.	"Chahun Main Ya Naa"	Irshad Kamil	Jeet Gannguli	Arijit Singh, Palak Muchhal	5:04
4.	"Hum Mar Jayenge"	Irshad Kamil	Jeet Gannguli	Arijit Singh, Tulsi Kumar	5:07
5.	"Meri Aashiqui"	Irshad Kamil	Mithoon	Palak Muchhal, Arijit Singh	4:26
6.	"Piya Aaye Na"	Irshad Kamil	Jeet Gannguli	K.K, Tulsi Kumar	4:46
7.	"Aasan Nahin Yahan"	Irshad Kamil	Jeet Gannguli	Arijit Singh	3:34
8.	"Sunn Raha Hai" (Female Version)	Sandeep Nath	Ankit Tiwari	Shreya Ghoshal	5:14
9.	"Bhula Dena"	Sanjay Masoomm	Jeet Gannguli	Mustafa Zahid	4:00
10.	"Milne Hai Mujhse Aayi"	Irshad Kamil	Jeet Gannguli	Arijit Singh	4:55
11.	"Aashiqui" (The Love Theme)		Mithoon		2:42
Total length:					50:40

== Awards and nominations ==
Year	Nominee	Award	Category	Result	Ref.
2013	Ankit Tiwari, Mithoon and Jeet Gannguli	Filmfare Awards	Filmfare Award for Best Music Director	Won	
2013	Arijit Singh	Filmfare Awards	Best Playback Singer (Male)	Won	
2013	Ankit Tiwari	Filmfare Awards	Best Playback Singer (Male)	Nominated	
2013	Shreya Ghoshal	Filmfare Awards	Best Playback Singer (Female)	Nominated	
2013	Mithoon	Filmfare Awards	Best Lyrics for "Tum Hi Ho"	Nominated	
2013	Arijit Singh	Screen Awards	Best Playback Singer (Male)	Won	
2013	Shreya Ghoshal	Screen Awards	Best Playback Singer (Female)	Won	
2013	Ankit Tiwari, Mithoon and Jeet Gannguli	Screen Awards	Best Music Director	Nominated	
2014	Shreya Ghoshal	Filmfare Awards	Best Female Playback Singer	Nominated	
2014	Shreya Ghoshal	IIFA Awards	Best Female Playback Singer	Won	
2014	Shreya Ghoshal	Zee Cine Awards	Best Playback Singer – Female	Won	
2014	Shreya Ghoshal	Screen Awards	Best Female Playback Singer	Won	
2014	Shreya Ghoshal	Mirchi Music Awards	Vocalist (Female) of the Year	Nominated	
2014	Shreya Ghoshal	Gaana Awards	Most Popular Singer (female)	Won	
2014	Shreya Ghoshal	GiMA Awards	Best Playback Singer − Female	Won	
2014	Ankit Tiwari	Filmfare Awards	Best Playback Singer (Male)	Nominated	
2014	Ankit Tiwari	Mirchi Music Awards	Upcoming Music Composer of the Year	Won	
2014	Ankit Tiwari	Mirchi Music Awards	Upcoming Male Vocalist of the Year	Won	
2014	Ankit Tiwari	Mirchi Music Awards	Best Song (Listeners' Choice Award)	Won	
2014	Ankit Tiwari	GiMA Awards	Best Music Debut	Won	
2014	Ankit Tiwari	GiMA Awards	Best Male Playback Singer	Nominated	
2014	Ankit Tiwari	IIFA Awards	Best Male Playback Singer	Nominated	
2014	Ankit Tiwari	Star Guild Awards	Best Male Playback Singer	Nominated	
2015	Sandeep Nath	Zee Cine Awards	Best Lyrics	Nominated	

== Additionals ==
A mashup was later released as a single on 29 May 2013.
