= 6th Mirchi Music Awards =

Indian film music awards in 2014

- Sponsored by: Royal Stag
- Date: February 27, 2014
- Country: India
- Presented by: Radio Mirchi
- Hosted by: Sonu Nigam

Highlights
- Most awards: Aashiqui 2 (8)
- Song of the Year: "Tum Hi Ho" - Aashiqui 2
- Album of the Year: Aashiqui 2

Television/radio coverage
- Network: Colors

The 6th Mirchi Music Awards, presented by the Radio Mirchi, honoured the best of Hindi music from the year 2013. The ceremony was held on 27 February 2014 and was hosted by Sonu Nigam. There were many performances, including those by Sunidhi Chauhan, Arijit Singh, Ankit Tiwari and Mika Singh, who gave a tribute to R. D. Burman for his 75th birth anniversary. Aashiqui 2 won a leading eight awards including Album of the Year and Song of the Year for "Tum Hi Ho".

== Winners and nominees ==
The winners were selected by the members of jury, chaired by Javed Akhtar. The following are the names of winners.

=== Film awards ===
Category	Recipient	Song	Film
Song of the Year	-	"Tum Hi Ho"	Aashiqui 2
Album of the Year	Mithoon, Jeet Gannguli, Ankit Tiwari, Sandeep Nath, Irshad Kamil, Sanjay Masoomm	-	Aashiqui 2
Male Vocalist of the Year	Arijit Singh	"Tum Hi Ho"	Aashiqui 2
Female Vocalist of the Year	Chinmayi	"Titli"	Chennai Express
Music Composer of the Year	Mithoon	"Tum Hi Ho"	Aashiqui 2
Lyricist of the Year	Prasoon Joshi	"Maston Ka Jhund"	Bhaag Milkha Bhaag
Upcoming Male Vocalist of the Year	Ankit Tiwari	"Sunn Raha Hai"	Aashiqui 2
Upcoming Female Vocalist of the Year	Bhoomi Trivedi	"Ram Chahe Leela"	Goliyon Ki Rasleela Ram-Leela
Upcoming Music Composer of The Year	Ankit Tiwari	"Sunn Raha Hai"	Aashiqui 2
Upcoming Lyricist of The Year	Siddharth-Garima	"Laal Ishq"	Goliyon Ki Rasleela Ram-Leela
Song representing Sufi tradition	-	"Mera Yaar"	Bhaag Milkha Bhaag
Raag-Inspired Song of the Year	-	"Ek Ghadi"	D-Day

=== Technical awards ===
Category	Recipient	Song	Film
Programmer & Arranger of the Year	Hyacinth D’Souza, DJ Phukan, Sunny M.R. and Nikhil Paul George	"Badtameez Dil"	Yeh Jawaani Hai Deewani
Song Recording/Sound Engineering of the Year	Shekhar Ravjiani	"Titli"	Chennai Express
Background Score of the Year	Shantanu Moitra	-	Madras Cafe

=== Non-film awards ===
Indie Pop Song of the Year	"Cheene Re Mora Chain" sung by Salim–Sulaiman and Rashid Khan

=== Special awards ===
Lifetime Achievement Award	Anandji
Royal Stag Make It Large Award	Farhan Akhtar
Face of Romantic Songs	Shah Rukh Khan

=== Listeners' Choice awards ===
Listeners' Choice Song of the Year	"Sunn Raha Hai" - Aashiqui 2
Listeners' Choice Album of the Year	Aashiqui 2

=== Jury awards ===
Outstanding Contribution to Hindi Film Music	Sumit Mitra
Best Album of Golden Era (1953)	Anarkali
Special Jury Award	Vanraj Bhatia

=== Films with multiple wins ===
Films that received multiple awards
Wins	Film
8	Aashiqui 2‡
2	Bhaag Milkha Bhaag
2	Chennai Express
2	Goliyon Ki Rasleela Ram-Leela

‡ Won two Listeners' Choice awards

== Jury ==
The jury was chaired by Javed Akhtar. Other members were:

- Aadesh Shrivastava - music composer and singer
- Alka Yagnik - playback singer
- Anu Malik - music director
- Anurag Basu - director, producer and screenwriter
- Ila Arun - actress and folk singer
- Irshad Kamil - lyricist
- Lalit Pandit - composer
- Kavita Krishnamurthy - playback singer
- Louis Banks - composer, record producer and singer
- Prasoon Joshi - lyricist and screenwriter
- Ramesh Sippy - director and producer
- Sadhana Sargam - playback singer
- Sameer - lyricist
- Sapna Mukherjee - playback singer
- Shailendra Singh - playback singer
- Shankar Mahadevan - composer and playback singer
- Sooraj Barjatya - director, producer and screenwriter
- Subhash Ghai- director, producer and screenwriter
- Sudhir Mishra - director and screenwriter
- Suresh Wadkar - playback singer
- Swanand Kirkire - lyricist
- Talat Aziz - singer

== See also ==
- Mirchi Music Awards
