= Malang (film) =

2020 Indian film by Mohit Suri

- Theatrical release poster
- Directed by: Mohit Suri
- Screenplay by: Aniruddha Guha
- Dialogues by: Aseem Arrora
- Story by: Mohit Suri
- Produced by: Bhushan Kumar; Krishan Kumar; Luv Ranjan; Ankur Garg; Jay Shewakramani Ramana Rudrapati
- Starring: Anil Kapoor; Aditya Roy Kapur; Disha Patani; Kunal Khemu
- Cinematography: Vikas Sivaraman
- Edited by: Devendra Murdeshwar
- Music by: Score: Raju Singh; Songs: Mithoon; Ankit Tiwari; Ved Sharma; The Fusion Project; Adnan Dhool; Rabi Ahmed
- Production companies: T-Series Films; Luv Films; Northern Lights Films
- Distributed by: Yash Raj Films
- Release date: 7 February 2020
- Running time: 135 minutes
- Country: India
- Language: Hindi
- Box office: est. ₹84.5 crores

Malang (transl. Vagrant or Wanderer) is a 2020 Indian Hindi-language romantic action thriller film directed by Mohit Suri, produced by Luv Films, T-Series & Northern Lights Entertainment and distributed by Yash Raj Films. It stars Anil Kapoor, Aditya Roy Kapur, Disha Patani, and Kunal Khemu. Malang was released on 7 February 2020.

== Plot ==
Anjaney Agashe, a rugged drug-addicted Inspector, gets rid of known criminals by killing them and staging their deaths as an encounter.

Meanwhile, Advait Thakur, a released convict, immediately calls Agashe and informs him of an upcoming murder of a cop and wishes him Happy Solstice. Michael Rodrigues is Agashe's colleague and a plays-by-the-rules cop whose personal life is breaking down as his wife Teresa is frustrated by his lack and fear of intimacy. Later, Michael learns that his friend and co-worker Victor has been brutally murdered. At the crime scene, Michael meets Agashe and the two are instantly at odds with each other.

Agashe wants to kill the killer, while Michael wants the killer to be imprisoned. It is implied that Advait is behind Victor's death. Advait soon kills Michael's colleagues Nitin and Deven, where Michael becomes suspicious of Jessie, a drug-addicted prostitute and Advait's friend. It is implied that Jessie has been helping Advait with the murders. Michael notices her in the room and follows her to her presiding place. On knowing that Michael is following her, Jessie tries to burn down the evidence at her place, but Michael enters and learns that he is also one of the targets on Advait's hitlist. Advait surrenders himself to Agashe and Michael's past with Advait is revealed.

Past: Advait, a cheerful and happy-go-lucky guy, meets Sara Nambiar at a rave party in Goa. The two fall in love and decide to travel and party together as vagrants. One day, Sara finds out that she is pregnant with Advait's child. The two initially decide to mutually abort the child. At another rave party, Agashe gatecrashes the same party to capture drug dealers and a shootout ensues, where Vaani, Agahse's daughter, is killed in the crossfire. Sara witnesses Agashe's breakdown at Vaani's death and changes her mind. Vaani's death also leads to Agashe's alcoholism, drug addiction and his change in personality. Sara tells Advait of her decision and that she does not need a nomadic life. Having a fear of commitment, Advait leaves Sara and goes towards the northern mountains to stay with a friend, but he tells Advait that while he may loose the freedom he enjoyed and will face plenty of other struggles, settling down with Sara and his child will also bring a satisfaction and life he could never find as a vagrant, which his friend found after settling down with his own girlfriend. Encouraged, Adavit heads back to Goa.

Meanwhile, Michael is about to marry Teresa, but is uncomfortable with sex and intimacy. Fearing that his lack of sexual experience will make him "less than a man", Michael goes to Jessie to lose his virginity. Sara has been living with Jessie after Advait left her. When Jessie was away at the market, Michael arrives and mistakes Sara for Jessie. Advait arrives at Jessie's house and finds Michael trying to strangle Sara, where he intervenes and calls the cops. Nitin, Deven and Victor arrive to take Sara and Advait to the station. However, the police instead take Advait and Sara to a bridge, where they plan to frame them for drug peddling to avoid Michael's scandal of visiting a prostitute. Michael injects a lethal drug into the couple before throwing Sara off the bridge, while Advait is sentenced to five years in prison.

Present: Michael reveals to Advait at the station that he strangled Jessie to death after the house burnt, where he leaves so that Agashe can kill him in an encounter. Agashe takes Advait to the same bridge, where Advait tells him that Michael and his friends killed Sara. At the same time, Michael goes home and sees that Teresa is about to leave him. Michael suffers a psychotic breakdown and attempts to strangle her, but he gets injected and killed with a drug by Sara, who is still alive.

It is revealed that Jessie had saved Sara, who lost her baby. Over the course of five years, Sara and Advait had been planning to exact vengeance together. Agashe's assistant receives a call informing him that Michael has been killed in his own home. A shocked Agashe wonders and reluctantly releases Advait due to lack of evidence and Teresa protects Sara by telling a fake testimony. Advait and Sara find peace and start a new life, while Agashe receives a phone call from an unknown female caller who similarly informs him about an upcoming murder like Advait.

== Cast ==
- Anil Kapoor as Inspector Anjaney Agashe
- Aditya Roy Kapur as Advait Thakur
- Disha Patani as Sara Nambiar
- Kunal Khemu as Michael Rodrigues
- Amruta Khanvilkar as Teresa Rodrigues
- Vatsal Sheth as Victor Ferns
- Makarand Deshpande as Tony
- Elli AvrRam as Jessabelle alias Jessie
- Keith Sequeira as Nitin Salgaonkar
- Prasad Jawade as Deven Shivaji Jadhav
- Sanjeev Dhuri as Borkar
- Siddharth Narayanan as Mady
- Devika Vatsa as Vaani Agashe
- Vansh Sayani as Nitin Salgaonkar's son
- Shaad Randhawa as Advait's friend
- Shraddha Kapoor as an unknown caller(voice over)

== Production ==
Malang was initially offered to Shraddha Kapoor who could not fit the film into her busy schedule, but she agreed to do voiceover in the climax. The filming began on 16 March 2019. The principal photography began on 22 March in Goa. The Mauritius schedule was shot in the first week of May. The film was wrapped up on 7 October 2019.

== Soundtrack ==
Malang – Unleash the Madness

Soundtrack album by Mithoon, Ankit Tiwari, Ved Sharma, Asim Azhar, Adnan Dhool and Rabi Ahmed
- Released: 13 March 2020
- Recorded: 2019
- Genre: Feature film soundtrack
- Length: 30:06
- Language: Hindi
- Label: T-Series
External audio
- Official Audio Jukebox on YouTube

The film's music was composed by with Mithoon, Ankit Tiwari, Ved Sharma, Asim Azhar, Adnan Dhool and Rabi Ahmed with lyrics written by Sayeed Quadri, Kunaal Vermaa, Prince Dubey, Haarsh Limbachiyaa and Adnan Dhool (for "Ho Ja Mast Malang Tu", a version of his band Soch's earlier single "Bol Hu" - released by Nescafé Basement).

Pakistani singer and composer Asim Azhar originally composed and performed the song "Humraah", collaborating with Indian lyricist and poet Kunaal Vermaa. Director Mohit Suri selected the track for the film, but due to India–Pakistan tensions, T-Series re-recorded the song with Indian singer Sachet Tandon and removed Asim Azhar's name from the composer credits, instead attributing it to "The Fusion Project". However, Asim Azhar was still credited in the film's opening credits. He later released his original version of "Humraah" independently on his own YouTube channel.

"Ho Ja Mast Malang Tu" was also initially planned to be replaced by a track titled "Bande Elahi", written and composed by Mithoon and sung by Shadab Faridi and Richa Sharma. However, the censor board surprisingly insisted that the original song be retained. "Bande Elahi" remained unreleased, though it was mistakenly listed in the film's end credits.

Track listing
| No. | Title | Lyrics | Music | Singer(s) | Length |
|---|---|---|---|---|---|
| 1. | "Chal Ghar Chalen" | Sayeed Quadri | Mithoon | Arijit Singh, Ali Zaidi | 5:40 |
| 2. | "Malang – Title Track" | Kunaal Vermaa, Haarsh Limbachiyaa | Ved Sharma | Ved Sharma | 4:47 |
| 3. | "Humraah" | Kunaal Vermaa | The Fusion Project | Sachet Tandon | 4:59 |
| 4. | "Phir Na Milen Kabhi" | Prince Dubey | Ankit Tiwari | Ankit Tiwari | 4:59 |
| 5. | "Hui Malang" | Kunaal Vermaa, Haarsh Limbachiyaa | Ved Sharma | Asees Kaur | 3:12 |
| 6. | "Ho Ja Mast Malang Tu" | Adnan Dhool | Adnan Dhool, Rabi Ahmed | Adnan Dhool, Hadiya Hashmi | 6:29 |
| 7. | "Humraah (Asim Azhar Version)" | Kunaal Vermaa | The Fusion Project | Asim Azhar | 5:15 |
| 8. | "Bande Elahi (unreleased)" | Mithoon | Mithoon | Shadab Faridi, Richa Sharma |
| Total length: | | | | | 35:21 |

== Release ==
The film was initially scheduled to be released on 14 February 2020; later on 26 December 2019, it was moved earlier by a week to 7 February 2020. The movie was made available in Netflix on 15 May.

== Reception ==
On the review aggregator website Rotten Tomatoes, 44% of 9 critics' reviews are positive, with an average rating of 4.7/10.

Harshada Rege of The Times of India gave 3.5/5 stars and wrote "In this film, none of the characters are uni-dimensional, which makes them interesting. Malang begins well with a power-packed action scene, and dives straight into the drama." Madhuri V of Filmibeat gave 3.5/5 stars and wrote "After the lacklustre Half Girlfriend, Mohit Suri returns to his favourite genre- thrillers, and we must say, the man pulls it off quite well when it comes to calling the shots. Mohit Suri offers you doses of thrills and twists in regular intervals in his latest film."

Bollywood Hungama gave 3.5/5 stars and wrote "Malang is high on style with good performances and thrilling moments but has an average storyline. Rajeev Masand of News18 gave 2/5 stars and wrote "The world of Malang is dark and twisted, and Mohit Suri depicts the beach state as a Wasseypur-like badlands with rampant drug use."

Devesh Sharma of Filmfare gave 2.5/5 stars and wrote "Malang is a flawed but entertaining product and would be especially liked by those who are fans of slasher flicks." Shubhra Gupta of The Indian Express gave 1.5/5 stars and wrote "Malang is a tepid thriller and its twists don't really take you aback".

Kennith Rosario of The Hindu wrote "The high-pitched aesthetics of this film can be overlooked, but not the unsubstantiated violence that rises from strange notions of misogyny and masculinity." Monika Rawal Kukreja of Hindustan Times wrote "Watch Malang if you really must. It rides on the thrill quotient, has some good performances and a good looking pair at its centre but that’s about it. The plot ends up looking like a mockery of a subject that needed a better storytelling."

=== Box office ===
Malang earned ₹6.71 crore net at the domestic box office on its opening day. On the second day, the film collected ₹8.89 crore net and 9.76 crores on its third day, taking the total opening weekend collection to ₹25.36 crores.

As of 19 March 2020, with a gross of ₹70.23 crore in India and ₹14.27 crore overseas, the film has a worldwide gross collection of ₹84.50 crore.

== Sequel ==
A sequel, Malang 2, was officially announced on 31 May 2020. Starring Shraddha Kapoor, Sidharth Malhotra and Anil Kapoor.
