= Nee Jathaga Nenundali =

2014 Telugu romantic film

- Poster
- Directed by: Jaya Ravindra
- Written by: Shagufta Rafique
- Produced by: Bandla Ganesh
- Starring: Sachiin J Joshi; Nazia Hussain
- Cinematography: A. Vasanth
- Edited by: M. R. Varma
- Music by: Mithoon; Jeet Gannguli; Ankit Tiwari
- Production company: Parameswara Art Productions
- Release date: 22 August 2014
- Country: India
- Language: Telugu

Nee Jathaga Nenundali (transl. I Want to Be Your Companion) is a 2014 Indian Telugu-language musical romantic drama film directed by Jaya Ravindra. Sachiin J. Joshi and Nazia Hussain star in lead roles. It is an official remake of 2013 film Aashiqui 2, which was an adaptation of both the original 1937 version and the 1976 remake of A Star is Born films. (Note: The 1937 film is in the public domain and was based on the film What Price Hollywood? (1932), itself adapted from a story by Adela Rogers St. Johns, who loosely based her plot on the experiences of actress Colleen Moore and her husband, alcoholic producer John McCormick, and the life and death of director Tom Forman, who committed suicide following a nervous breakdown.) The name of the film is taken from the song of the same name from the 2014 film Yevadu.

== Plot ==
Raghava Jairam – a successful singer and musician whose career is waning because of his alcohol addiction – is on stage in Goa when his performance is interrupted by his rival Varun (Aadarsh Balakrishna). After a fight, Raghav leaves the venue and drives to a local bar, where he meets Gayathri Nandan (Nazia), a bar singer who idolises him. Seeing her looking at a photograph of Lata Mangeshkar in the bar, and impressed by her voice, Raghava promises to transform her into a singing sensation, and asks her never to perform again in bars.

Gayathri leaves her job and returns to Hyderabad with Raghav, who convinces record producer Sravan (Rao Ramesh) to meet her. Raghav is attacked and injured by some thugs, and his manager Vivek (Shashank) prevents the news being leaked to the media; instead he spreads the story that Raghav has left the country to perform abroad. After two months of unsuccessfully attempting to contact Raghav, a broken Gayathri is forced to sing in bars again.

Meanwhile, Raghav recovers from his injuries and starts searching for Gayathri. He learns that Vivek had ignored her calls without informing him. Raghav apologizes to Gayathri and fires Vivek, and they meet Sravan to sign a recording agreement. Raghav begins to train Gayathri, who becomes a successful playback singer. When gossip spreads that Raghav is using her as a servant, he relapses into alcohol addiction. Gayathri comforts him and they spend the night together. Despite her mother's disapproval, she moves in with Raghav and things go well until his addiction worsens, causing him to become aggressive and violent. Gayathri attempts to rehabilitate Raghav, sacrificing her singing career in doing so.

After Sravan reminds them about their dream of Gayathri becoming a successful singer, Raghav tells her to focus on her work. During Gayathri's stage show, Raghav meets a journalist who accuses him of using Gayathri for pleasure and money. Raghav beats up the journalist and starts drinking. He ends up in jail, and Gayathri comes to bail him out. Raghav overhears Gayathri telling Sravan that she is going to give up her career because Raghav is more important to her. He sees that he has become a burden and that leaving her is his only option to save her. The next day, he bids her farewell by assuring her that he will change his lifestyle. He drives off to a bridge and dies by jumping off.

Distraught by Raghav's death, Gayathri decides to give up her career but Vivek persuades her to stay, reminding her that Raghav wanted her to become a successful singer and killed himself because he did not want to be an obstacle in the path of her success. Gayathri agrees, and returns to singing. After four years, she is shown with her son, who is also Raghav's son.

== Cast ==
- Sachiin J Joshi as Raghav Jayaram a.k.a. R. Jay
- Nazia Hussain as Gayatri Nandana
- Rao Ramesh as Sravan
- Shashank as Vivek
- Aadarsh Balakrishna as Archrival from the Spectators
- Posani Krishna Murali as Bar owner
- Shubhangi Latkar as Gayatri's mother

== Production ==
A song was shot at the Anata River in Thailand.

== Soundtrack ==
The songs were reused from the original.

No.	Title	Lyrics	Music	Singer(s)	Length
1.	"Premante Emito" (Aasan Nahi Yahan)	Chandra Bose	Jeet Gannguli	Sharib Sabri
2.	"Kshaminchave Cheli" (Bhula Dena)	Chandra Bose	Jeet Gannguli	Sreerama Chandra Mynampati
3.	"Nijamaa Kaada" (Chahun Main Ya Naa)	Chandra Bose	Jeet Gannguli	Abhay Jodhpurkar, Palak Muchhal
4.	"Ee Pichchey Premani" (Hum Mar Jayenge)	Chandra Bose	Jeet Gannguli	Palak Muchhal, Mynampati Sreerama Chandra
5.	"Kanabadunaa" (Piya Aayena)	Chandra Bose	Jeet Gannguli	KK, Arpita Chakraborty
6.	"Pranama Naa Pranama" (Tum Hi Ho)	Chandra Bose	Mithoon	Arijit Singh
7.	"Manase Pedavina" (Meri Aashiqui)	Chandra Bose	Mithoon	Arpita Chakraborty, Arijit Singh
8.	"Vintunnavva Nestham" (Male) (Sunn Raha Hai)	Chandra Bose	Ankit Tiwari	Ankit Tiwari
9.	"Vintunnavva Nestham" (Female) (Sunn Raha Hai)	Chandra Bose	Ankit Tiwari	Shreya Ghoshal
