= Tum Hi Ho =

2013 song by Arijit Singh

- Soundtrack cover

Single by Arijit Singh

from the album Aashiqui 2
- Language: Hindi
- Released: 23 March 2013
- Genre: Acoustic music, Filmi, Indian pop
- Length: 4:22
- Label: T-Series
- Songwriter: Mithoon
- Producers: Bhushan Kumar; Krishan Kumar; Mukesh Bhatt

Aashiqui 2 track listing
- 1. "Tum Hi Ho"; 2. "Sunn Raha Hai"; 3. "Chahun Main Ya Naa"; 4. "Hum Mar Jaayenge"; 5. "Meri Aashiqui"; 6. "Piya Aaye Na"; 7. "Aasan Nahin Yahan"; 8. "Sunn Raha Hai" (Female Version); 9. "Bhula Dena"; 10. "Milne Hai Mujhse Aayi"; 11. "Aashiqui (The Love Theme)

Music video
- "Tum Hi Ho" on YouTube

"Tum Hi Ho" (transl. You are the one) is an Indian Hindi-language romantic song from the 2013 Indian film Aashiqui 2, sung by Arijit Singh. It was composed and written by Mithoon. Picturised on Aditya Roy Kapur and Shraddha Kapoor, it was released by Bhushan Kumar under T-Series, and was in the top 10 of Planet Bollywood for eight weeks and capturing the first spot on the Top 20 of MTV India for seven weeks.

== Background and composition ==
The song had been recorded by Mithoon two years before its release with Arijit Singh's vocals. Mithoon recalls,

"It all started when the director Mohit Suri called me up to make the title track for the film Aashiqui 2. Mohit Suri happens to be a very vocal director, so for an hour he spoke about what he expects from the song. And then I asked him to describe the song in one line and he said, 'Tum hi ho bas tum hi ho' so this is how it all started,"

Mithoon described how the Aashiqui 2 team was conducting a public search to find the right voice for the film’s protagonist (played by Aditya Roy Kapur), but he was convinced that Arijit Singh was the ideal choice for "Tum Hi Ho." He recalled: "When I played the ‘Tum Hi Ho’ track to Mohit Suri, it was already recorded in Arijit’s voice. The first thing he asked me was, ‘Who is the singer?’ I said the singer’s name is Arijit Singh, and Mohit said, ‘This is bang on. I want him for all the songs in the soundtrack.’ And that was a very fulfilling moment for me because creativity won at that moment."

Mithoon chose Arijit Singh for the vocals at a time when Singh was still in search of a major breakthrough. He said that it was Singh’s voice and singing style that impressed him: “I always look for voice and not names. Singers like Shilpa Rao and Mohammed Irfan were just names when they started working and they have reached places.”

While recording the song, Mithoon asked Singh to keep the delivery emotionally restrained: “I never wanted the emotion to be exaggerated. Despite the word ‘Aashiqui’ being repeated quite often, the notes are extremely simple.”

Describing his creative process, Mithoon said he typically composes in parallel with songwriting, beginning with scene narration from the director to ensure the song fits the story. He emphasized that his aim was never to create a hit track, stating, “My approach for ‘Tum Hi Ho’ was never to create a title track… The song holds more values than these numbers.” He reiterated this point with PTI via NDTV that he aims to create "soulful tracks without bothering about any hype or trend," stating, "As a film music director, I only aim at conveying the story through my music." He emphasized keeping the composition for “Tum Hi Ho” simple, noting that the song "does not have much except sincere lyrics and a single melody."

Regarding the lyrics, Mithoon explained that the lyrics for “Tum Hi Ho” emerged organically while developing the melody, despite not being initially assigned to write the song. He said, “When Mohit Suri briefed me, and I was surrounded by those thoughts, I just came up with those lines—‘Hum tere bin ab reh nahi sakte, tere bina kya wajood mera…’. I think it just came very naturally to me.” He added that the positive audience response to the song encouraged him to continue writing lyrics for his compositions on future projects.

== Release ==
The song was released on 23 March 2013, along with the teaser of the music video by T-Series, followed by its release the next day. It garnered over 1,852,947 views within 10 days of launch.

== Critical reception ==
The song received acclaim from critics. Glamsham gave a rating of 5 stars out of 5 and said, "It is indeed an exhilarating experience listening to the songs of Aashiqui 2 and in this age of mundane and average/repetitive musical fares that are being churned out, the audio of Aashiqui 2 is surely a treat for all music buffs. "Tum Hi Ho" and "Sunn Raha Hai" (both versions) are our favourites, but "Chahun Main Ya Naa" and "Piya Aaye Na" end up as a close second. A chartbusting musical experience indeed."

Planet Bollywood commented "The song has all the hallmarks of a Mithoon creation; it's soulful, extremely touching and of course it's dripping with melody. The piano, strings, and beats are very effective in creating an eerie romantic atmosphere for the singer to transform the song and Arijit Singh does that magnificently."

Koimoi commented, "Album opens with a heavy and deep voice of Arijit Singh crooning "Tum Hi Ho". Composer Mithoon has penned the lyrics for this passionate ballad which might remind one of the rest of the Bhatt music that has been heard in abundance in recent times, right from Raaz 3 to Jism 2. Arijit's voice does touch the listener's heart and lyrics support the passion as well." IANS wrote, "The album opens with "Tum Hi Ho". Sung by Arijit Singh, it starts slowly but gradually picks up the pace. Melodious and rhythmic, it has meaningful lyrics. A romantic number that reflects both the joy and the emotional struggle of a lover.

== Success and impact ==
The song garnered approximately 5 million views on YouTube within 10 days of release, which helped in the marketing of the film. Aashiqui 2 had less than 3 weeks for the promotion. The movie upon release earned ₹132 crores in an 11-week run worldwide. The song won Most Entertaining Song of the year at the Big Star Entertainment Awards 2013. The music video on YouTube has garnered 281 million views as in March 2021. The song catapulted singer Arijit Singh to overnight fame, and he emerged as one of the top Indian singers of the 2010s.

== Awards and nominations ==
Year	Award	Category	Nominee	Result	Notes	Ref.
2013	BIG Star Entertainment Awards	BIG Star Most Entertaining Song	"Tum Hi Ho"	Won		
2013	BIG Star Entertainment Awards	BIG Star Most Entertaining Singer (Male)	Arijit Singh	Nominated		
2014	20th Screen Awards	Screen Award for Best Male Playback	Arijit Singh	Won		
2014	Producers Guild Film Awards	Guild Award for Best Male Playback Singer	Arijit Singh	Won		
2014	Producers Guild Film Awards	Guild Award for Best Lyricist	Mithoon	Won		
2014	GiMA Awards	GiMA Award for Best Male Playback Singer	Arijit Singh	Won		
2014	GiMA Awards	GiMA Award for Best Film Song	"Tum Hi Ho"	Won		
2014	Bollywood Hungama Surfers Choice Music Awards	Best Playback Singer - Male	Arijit Singh	Won		
2014	Bollywood Hungama Surfers Choice Music Awards	Best Lyricist	Mithoon	Won		
2014	59th Filmfare Awards	Filmfare Award for Best Male Playback Singer	Arijit Singh	Won		
2014	59th Filmfare Awards	Filmfare Award for Best Lyricist	Mithoon	Nominated		
2014	6th Mirchi Music Awards	Mirchi Music Award for Song of The Year	"Tum Hi Ho"	Won		
2014	6th Mirchi Music Awards	Mirchi Music Award for Male Vocalist of The Year	Arijit Singh	Won		
2014	6th Mirchi Music Awards	Mirchi Music Award for Music Composer of The Year	Mithoon	Won		
2014	Gaana Awards	Gaana Awards for Most Popular Singer (Male)	Arijit Singh	Won		
2014	Zee Cine Awards	Zee Cine Award for Song of The Year	"Tum Hi Ho"	Won		
2014	Zee Cine Awards	Zee Cine Award for Best Playback Singer (Male)	Arijit Singh	Won		
2014	Zee Cine Awards	Zee Cine Award for Best Lyrics	Mithoon	Won		
2014	15th IIFA Awards	IIFA Award for Best Male Playback Singer	Arijit Singh	Won		
2014	15th IIFA Awards	IIFA Award for Best Lyricist	Mithoon	Won		
2021	13th Mirchi Music Awards	Mirchi Music Award for Song of the Decade	"Tum Hi Ho"	Nominated	along with Mithoon	
2021	13th Mirchi Music Awards	Mirchi Music Award for Male Vocalist of the Decade	Arijit Singh	Nominated		

== Certifications ==
Certifications for Tum Hi Ho
Region	Certification	Certified units/sales
United Kingdom (BPI)	Silver	200,000^{‡}
^{‡} Sales+streaming figures based on certification alone.

== Meri Aashiqui ==
"Meri Aashiqui"

Song by Palak Muchhal & Arijit Singh

from the album Aashiqui 2
- Language: Hindi
- Released: 29 March 2013
- Genre: Acoustic Music, Filmi, Indian pop
- Length: 4:26
- Label: T-Series
- Songwriter: Mithoon
- Producers: Bhushan Kumar; Krishan Kumar; Mukesh Bhatt

Music video
- "Meri Aashiqui" on YouTube

A duet version of the song, "Meri Aashiqui" was also released in the soundtrack album and later featured in the film itself. Composed and written by Mithoon, it is sung by Palak Muchhal, along with Arijit Singh reprising his vocals.

=== Background ===
Palak Muchhal had already recorded vocals for the song "Chahun Main Yaa Naa" with Jeet Gannguli for the film when she received a call from Mithoon two days later to record "Meri Aashiqui". She notes, "It was such a divine composition with beautiful lyrics".

=== Critical reception ===
The song had mostly positive reviews, praising Muchhal's vocals along with Singh's. Koimoi comments, "Palak Muchhal opens the title track Meri Aashiqui slowly and deeply. Arijit adds the base with his voice. It’s a voice-dominated song with slow beats at the background. It should work with the listeners and also climb charts." Planet Bollywood comments, "There’s a reprise version of this song later in the album called “Meri Aashiqui” where Arijit is joined by Palak Muchal who sounds incredibly like Shreya Ghoshal which is high praise indeed. Nevertheless it’s super hit material just like the original." IANS writes, "The song has everything in sync - from lyrics, singers to the music. Go for this one."

=== Accolades ===
Year	Award	Category	Nominee	Result	Ref.	Note
2014	Zee Cine Awards	Zee Cine Award for Sa Re Ga Ma Pa Fresh Singing Talent	Palak Muchhal	Won		
2014	Zee Cine Awards	Zee Cine Award for Best Playback Singer (Female)	Palak Muchhal	Nominated		

== Other versions ==
"Tum Hi Ho" and "Meri Aashiqui" were remade in Telugu as "Pranamaa Naa Pranamaa" and "Manase Pedavina" respectively, for the 2014 film Nee Jathaga Nenundali; which is an official Telugu remake of Aashiqui 2. The lyrics were penned by Chandrabose. Arijit Singh reprises his vocals for both songs in Telugu, with Arpita Chakraborty replacing Palak Muchhal for the duet version.

Shreya Ghoshal and Armaan Malik performed the mixtape version of this song on T-Series Mixtape as "Tum Hi Ho/Rehnuma", a medley of "Tum Hi Ho" and "Rehnuma" from the film Rocky Handsome, which was also sung by Shreya Ghoshal along with Inder Bawra and composed by Sunny and Inder Bawra. The music of this version was directed by Abhijit Vaghani.

In December 2018, American rapper T-Pain was accused of plagiarizing the composition on his single called "That's Yo Money". However the music video has been taken down.
