= Saawariya =

2007 film by Sanjay Leela Bhansali

- Theatrical release poster
- Directed by: Sanjay Leela Bhansali
- Written by: Sanjay Leela Bhansali; Prakash Kapadia
- Based on: White Nights by Fyodor Dostoevsky
- Produced by: Sanjay Leela Bhansali
- Starring: Ranbir Kapoor; Sonam Kapoor; Rani Mukerji; Salman Khan; Zohra Sehgal
- Narrated by: Rani Mukerji
- Cinematography: Ravi K. Chandran
- Edited by: Sanjay Leela Bhansali
- Music by: Monty Sharma
- Production companies: SPE Films India Private Limited; Sanjay Leela Bhansali Films
- Distributed by: SPE Films India Private Limited (Note: Released through the Columbia Pictures label.)
- Release date: 9 November 2007 (India)
- Running time: 138 minutes
- Country: India
- Language: Hindi
- Budget: ₹45 crore
- Box office: ₹39.22 crore

Saawariya (transl. Beloved) is a 2007 Indian Hindi-language musical romance film directed and produced by Sanjay Leela Bhansali, based on Fyodor Dostoevsky's 1848 short story White Nights. The film marked the debuts of Ranbir Kapoor and Sonam Kapoor. It was the last film appearance of both Zohra Sehgal and Begum Para before their deaths. Co-produced by Sony Pictures Entertainment, it is the first Indian film to receive a North American release by a Hollywood studio and is one of the first Indian films to be released on Blu-ray Disc.

Saawariya was released on 9 November 2007 and received mixed-to-negative reviews upon release, with praise towards its soundtrack, production design, grand artistic approach and performances of the cast; however criticism towards its story, screenplay and pacing, and emerged as a box office under performer. Despite the film's underperformance, it has become a cult classic over the years.

At the 53rd Filmfare Awards, Saawariya received 6 nominations, including Best Supporting Actress (Rani Mukerji) and Best Music Director (Monty Sharma), and won Best Male Debut (Ranbir Kapoor) and Best Male Playback Singer (Shaan for "Jab Se Tere Naina").

== Plot ==
The narrative is framed through the recollections of Gulabji, a courtesan who frequents the town’s primary nightclub, the RK Bar. The establishment's lead singer, Ranbir Raj, whom Gulabji affectionately nicknames "Saawariya" ("beloved"), is an idealistic and kindhearted man who treats the local sex workers with genuine respect. When Raj mentions he needs employment and lodging, Gulabji directs him to Lillian, a stern but lonely landlady. Lillian agrees to rent a room to Raj because his gentle demeanor reminds her of her own son, who left years prior to join the army and never returned.

On his way home one night, Raj notices a mysterious young woman standing alone on a footbridge. He tries to strike up a conversation, but she initially reacts with suspicion and dismisses him. However, after Raj intervenes and protects her from a nearby drunkard, she allows him to escort her home safely. Raj discovers her name is Sakina and quickly falls in love with her.

Determined to express his feelings, Raj meets Sakina the following evening and takes her to his favorite spot atop the town's clock tower. Before he can confess, Sakina reveals that her heart already belongs to a man named Imaan. She explains that Imaan had rented a room in her house a year ago and, upon departing for an unspecified journey, promised to return and reunite with her on the night of Eid. Despite his prolonged absence, she continues to wait for him faithfully. Devastated by the revelation but skeptical of Imaan's existence, Raj seeks counsel from Gulabji. Secretly harboring her own unrequited love for Raj, Gulabji suppresses her pain and encourages him to confess his feelings to Sakina.

On the night of Eid, with the local neighborhood supporting him, Raj takes Sakina back to the RK Bar and dedicates a romantic song to her. Midway through the performance, Sakina realizes it is time to meet Imaan and abruptly rushes out to the footbridge. Raj follows her and tries to convince her that Imaan is a figment of her imagination, causing an upset Sakina to ask him to leave her alone. Heartbroken and disillusioned, Raj returns to Gulabji and asks to spend the night with her. Offended and deeply hurt that Raj views her only as a transactional escape, Gulabji has him thrown out into the street, where her guards beat him.

A bruised and remorseful Raj returns to the bridge, where Sakina is still waiting in vain. As midnight passes and Imaan fails to appear, a heartbroken Sakina accepts that he will not return and decides to move on with Raj. Raj successfully cheers her up, and the two happily plan their future together. However, as they walk back across the same footbridge, they notice a silhouette waiting in the shadows—revealed to be Imaan.

Sakina hesitates, torn between her developing bond with Raj and her long-standing devotion to Imaan. Sensing her internal conflict, Raj selflessly steps aside and urges her to choose her original love without guilt. Sakina reunites with Imaan, and the two walk away together into the night. The film concludes with Raj walking away alone into the snow, looking back on his brief time with Sakina with a resilient smile.

== Cast ==
- Ranbir Kapoor as Ranbir Raj Malhotra
- Sonam Kapoor as Sakina Khan
- Rani Mukerji as Gulabji
- Salman Khan as Imaan Pirzada
- Zohra Sehgal as Lillian "Lillipop"
- Begum Para as Nabila / Badi Ammi
- Vibha Chibber as Naseeban
- Atheya Chaudhri as Jhumri Aapa
- Kenny Desai as Mr. D' Costa

== Production ==
Bhansali initially wanted Rani Mukerji and Salman Khan's extended guest appearances to be hidden from the public, but later announced that they would appear in the film in supporting roles.

Elaborate sets for the film's imaginary city, complete with lakes, streets, shops, signages and a clock tower, were designed by the production designer Omung Kumar, who had previously worked with Bhansali on Black (2005).

== Release ==
The first official teaser of the film was accessed by New York Times on 25 August 2007. The first screening was held on 28 October 2007, though only for those associated with the film.

This film was released on 9 November 2007, clashing with Om Shanti Om, starring Shahrukh Khan, and Deepika Padukone.

== Soundtrack ==
Saawariya

Soundtrack album by Monty Sharma
- Released: 19 September 2007 (India)
- Genre: Feature film soundtrack
- Length: 47:44
- Label: Sony BMG
- Producer: Sanjay Leela Bhansali

Monty Sharma chronology
Black (2005)	Saawariya (2007)	TBA (2009)

The soundtrack album of the film is composed by Monty Sharma with lyrics written by Sameer. The soundtrack was released to mixed reviews on 19 September 2007. Indiafm gave the album 3 out of 5 stars, saying, "The title song would be remembered for months to come, if not years, the others do not really go that extra distance." According to the Indian trade website Box Office India, with around 10,00,000 units sold, the film's soundtrack album was the year's fourteenth highest-selling.

Saawariya Soundtrack
No.	Title	Lyrics	Singer(s)	Length
1.	"Saawariya"	Sameer	Shail Hada	2:45
2.	"Jab Se Tere Naina"	Sameer	Shaan	4:44
3.	"Masha-Allah"	Sameer	Kunal Ganjawala, Shreya Ghoshal	5:28
4.	"Thode Badmaash"	Nusrat Badr (Composed by Sanjay Leela Bhansali)	Shreya Ghoshal	3:19
5.	"Yun Shabnami"	Sandeep Nath	Parthiv Gohil	5:15
6.	"Daras Bina Nahin Chain"	Sameer	Richa Sharma, Shail Hada, Parthiv Gohil	4:45
7.	"Sawar Gayi"	Sameer	Shreya Ghoshal	3:42
8.	"Jaan-E-Jaan"	Sameer	Kunal Ganjawala, Shreya Ghoshal	5:59
9.	"Pari"	Sameer	Kunal Ganjawala	5:19
10.	"Chhabeela"	Sameer	Alka Yagnik	5:23
11.	"Saawariya (Reprise)"	Sameer	Shail Hada	3:06
Total length:				44:43

== Reception ==
On the review aggregator website Rotten Tomatoes, 38% of 21 critics' reviews are positive, with an average rating of 5/10. The website's consensus reads: "It's pleasing to the eye, but Saawariya struggles to fill its runtime with a story whose clichés unfortunately outnumber its points of interest." Metacritic, which uses a weighted average, assigned the film a score of 44 out of 100, based on 6 critics, indicating "mixed or average" reviews.

Shubhra Gupta of The Indian Express criticized the screenplay of the film calling it "static", adding that "Saawariya is an act of supreme self-indulgence". Jaspreet Pandohar of BBC rated the film 2 out of 5 writing, "It's a clear case of self-indulgence and theatrical style over substance; with the director paying little attention to fleshing out the skeletal screenplay, preferring instead to focus on coaxing 'good-looking' performances from his young muses."

== Accolades ==
Award (Note: Awards, festivals and organizations are in alphabetical order.)	Date of ceremony (Note: Date is linked to the article about the awards held that year, wherever possible.)	Category	Recipient(s)	Result	Ref.
Filmfare Awards	16 February 2008	Best Supporting Actress	Rani Mukerji	Nominated	
Filmfare Awards	16 February 2008	Best Male Debut	Ranbir Kapoor	Won	
Filmfare Awards	16 February 2008	Best Female Debut	Sonam Kapoor	Nominated	
Filmfare Awards	16 February 2008	Best Music Director	Monty Sharma	Nominated	
Filmfare Awards	16 February 2008	Best Lyricist	Sameer Anjaan – ("Jab Se Tere Naina")	Nominated	
Filmfare Awards	16 February 2008	Best Male Playback Singer	Shaan – ("Jab Se Tere Naina")	Won	
International Indian Film Academy Awards	6–8 June 2008	Best Supporting Actress	Rani Mukerji	Nominated	
International Indian Film Academy Awards	6–8 June 2008	Best Male Debut	Ranbir Kapoor	Won	
International Indian Film Academy Awards	6–8 June 2008	Best Music Director	Monty Sharma	Nominated	
International Indian Film Academy Awards	6–8 June 2008	Best Lyricist	Sameer Anjaan – ("Jab Se Tere Naina")	Nominated	
International Indian Film Academy Awards	6–8 June 2008	Best Male Playback Singer	Shaan – ("Jab Se Tere Naina")	Won	
International Indian Film Academy Awards	6–8 June 2008	Best Female Playback Singer	Shreya Ghoshal – ("Thode Badmash")	Nominated	
Producers Guild Film Awards	30 March 2008	Best Male Debut	Ranbir Kapoor	Won	
Producers Guild Film Awards	30 March 2008	Best Music Director	Monty Sharma	Nominated	
Producers Guild Film Awards	30 March 2008	Best Lyricist	Sameer Anjaan – ("Jab Se Tere Naina")	Nominated	
Producers Guild Film Awards	30 March 2008	Best Lyricist	Sandeep Nath – ("Yun Shabnami")	Nominated	
Producers Guild Film Awards	30 March 2008	Best Male Playback Singer	Shaan – ("Jab Se Tere Naina")	Won	
Producers Guild Film Awards	30 March 2008	Best Art Direction	Omung Kumar, Vanita Omung Kumar	Nominated	
Producers Guild Film Awards	30 March 2008	Best Choreography	Ganesh Hegde & Pappu Mallu – ("Yun Shabnami")	Nominated	
Producers Guild Film Awards	30 March 2008	Best Sound Recording	Resul Pookutty	Nominated	
Screen Awards	10 January 2008	Best Male Debut	Ranbir Kapoor	Won	
Screen Awards	10 January 2008	Best Female Debut	Sonam Kapoor	Nominated	
Screen Awards	10 January 2008	Best Music Director	Monty Sharma	Nominated	
Screen Awards	10 January 2008	Best Lyricist	Sameer Anjaan – ("Jab Se Tere Naina")	Nominated	
Screen Awards	10 January 2008	Best Male Playback Singer	Shaan – ("Jab Se Tere Naina")	Nominated	
Screen Awards	10 January 2008	Best Cinematography	Ravi K. Chandran	Nominated	
Screen Awards	10 January 2008	Best Art Direction	Omung Kumar	Nominated	
Screen Awards	10 January 2008	Best Choreography	Ganesh Hegde & Pappu Mallu – ("Yun Shabnami")	Nominated	
Stardust Awards	25 January 2008	Dream Director	Sanjay Leela Bhansali	Nominated	
Stardust Awards	25 January 2008	Best Supporting Actress	Rani Mukerji	Nominated	
Stardust Awards	25 January 2008	Superstar of Tomorrow – Male	Ranbir Kapoor	Won	
Stardust Awards	25 January 2008	Superstar of Tomorrow – Female	Sonam Kapoor	Won	
Stardust Awards	25 January 2008	Standout Performance by a Music Director	Monty Sharma	Won	
Stardust Awards	25 January 2008	Standout Performance by a Music Director	Sanjay Leela Bhansali	Nominated	
Stardust Awards	25 January 2008	Standout Performance by a Lyricist	Sandeep Nath – ("Yun Shabnami")	Won	
Stardust Awards	25 January 2008	New Musical Sensation – Male	Shail Hada – ("Saawariya")	Nominated	
Zee Cine Awards	26 April 2008	Best Male Debut	Ranbir Kapoor	Won	
Zee Cine Awards	26 April 2008	Best Female Debut	Sonam Kapoor	Nominated	
Zee Cine Awards	26 April 2008	Best Lyricist	Sameer Anjaan – ("Jab Se Tere Naina")	Nominated	
Zee Cine Awards	26 April 2008	Best Male Playback Singer	Shaan – ("Jab Se Tere Naina")	Won	
