= 15th IIFA Awards =

Indian film award ceremony in 2014

- Date: 23 April 2014– 26 April 2014
- Site: Raymond James Stadium; Tampa, Florida, USA
- Hosted by: Shahid Kapoor; Farhan Akhtar

Highlights
- Best Picture: Bhaag Milkha Bhaag
- Best Direction: Rakeysh Omprakash Mehra (Bhaag Milkha Bhaag)
- Best Actor: Farhan Akhtar (Bhaag Milkha Bhaag)
- Best Actress: Deepika Padukone (Chennai Express)
- Most awards: Bhaag Milkha Bhaag (14)
- Most nominations: Bhaag Milkha Bhaag (19)

Television coverage
- Channel: Star Plus
- Network: STAR TV

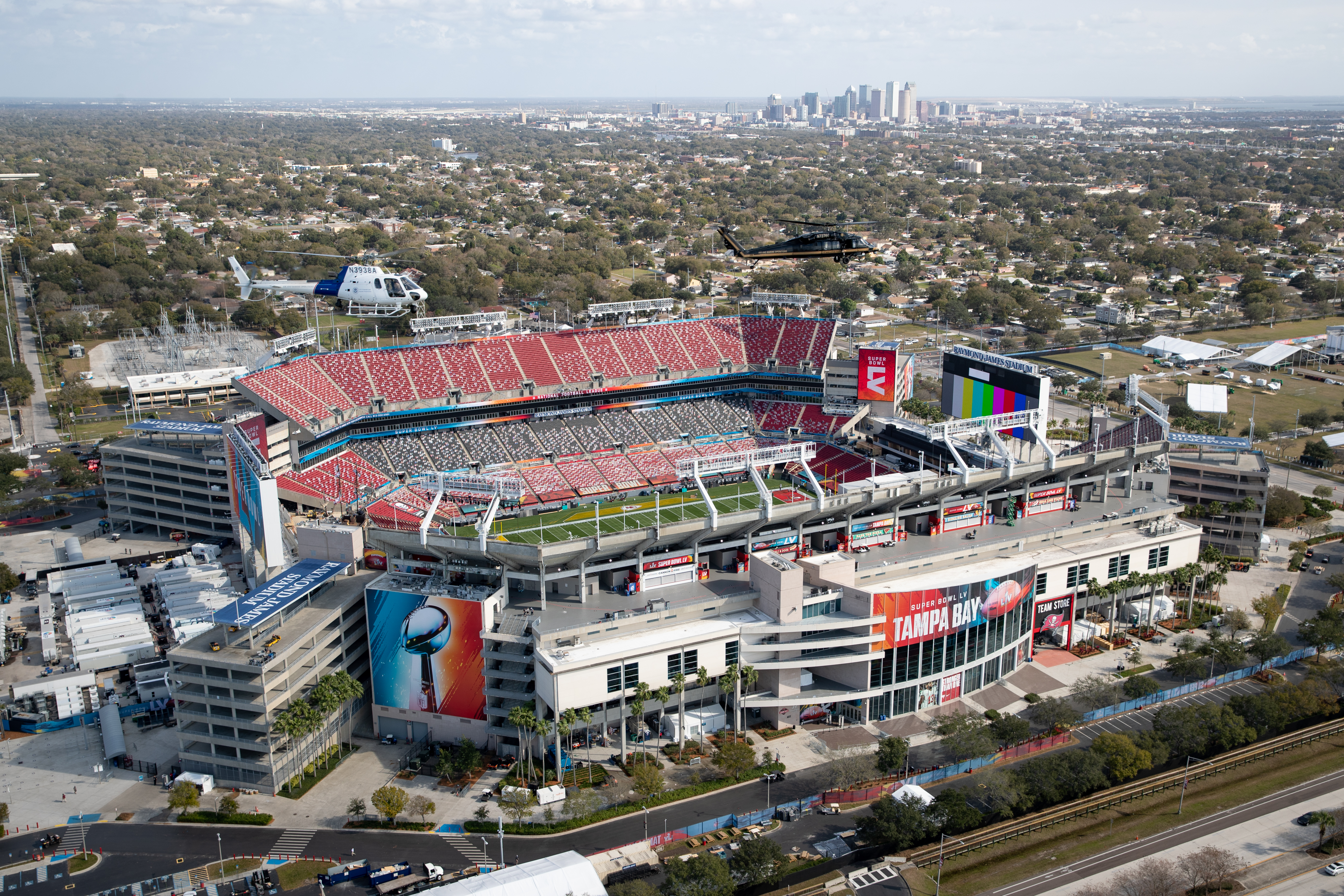
The event was held at Raymond James Stadium in Tampa, Florida, United States.

The 2014 IIFA Awards, officially known as the 15th International Indian Film Academy Awards ceremony, presented by the International Indian Film Academy honouring the best Hindi films of 2014, took place between 23 and 26 April 2014. The official ceremony took place on 26 April 2014 at the Raymond James Stadium in Tampa, Florida, in the United States for the first time. The ceremony was televised in India and internationally on Star Plus for the tenth & last consecutive year. The ceremony was co-hosted by actors Shahid Kapoor and Farhan Akhtar, returning as hosts for the third and second time respectively.

IIFA Rocks, otherwise known as the IIFA Music and Fashion Extravaganza took place on 25 April 2014. During the event, the technical awards were presented by actor Saif Ali Khan.

Bhaag Milkha Bhaag led the ceremony with 10 nominations, followed by Aashiqui 2, Goliyon Ki Raasleela Ram-Leela, and Yeh Jawaani Hai Deewani with 7 nominations each, and Krrish 3 with 5 nominations each.

Bhaag Milkha Bhaag won 14 awards, including Best Film, Best Director (for Rakeysh Omprakash Mehra), Best Actor (for Farhan Akhtar) and Best Supporting Actress (for Divya Dutta), thus becoming the most-awarded film at the ceremony.

Deepika Padukone received triple nominations for Best Actress for her performances in Chennai Express, Goliyon Ki Raasleela Ram-Leela and Yeh Jawaani Hai Deewani, winning for Chennai Express.

== Winners and nominees ==
=== Popular awards ===
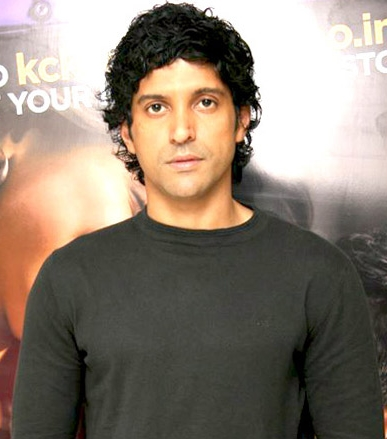
Farhan Akhtar (Best Actor)

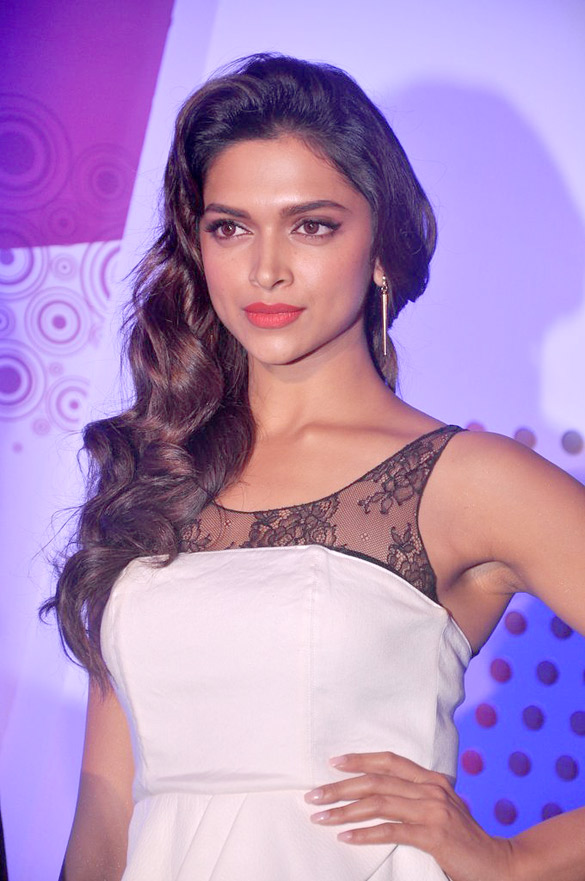
Deepika Padukone (Best Actress)

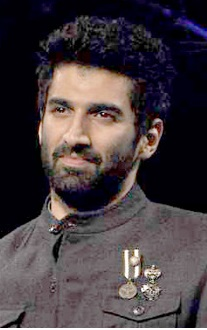
Aditya Roy Kapur (Best Supporting Actor)

Best Picture	Best Director
Bhaag Milkha Bhaag – Reliance Entertainment; Dhoom 3 – Yash Raj Films; Yeh Jawaani Hai Deewani – UTV Motion Pictures; Goliyon Ki Raasleela Ram-Leela – Eros International; Krrish 3 – Filmkraft Productions Pvt. Ltd; Kai Po Che! – UTV Motion Pictures; Chennai Express – UTV Motion Pictures	Rakeysh Omprakash Mehra – Bhaag Milkha Bhaag; Abhishek Kapoor – Kai Po Che!; Ayan Mukerji – Yeh Jawaani Hai Deewani; Rakesh Roshan – Krrish 3; Rohit Shetty – Chennai Express; Sanjay Leela Bhansali – Goliyon Ki Raasleela Ram-Leela
Best Actor in a Leading Role	Best Actress in a Leading Role
Farhan Akhtar – Bhaag Milkha Bhaag as Milkha Singh; Hrithik Roshan – Krrish 3 as Rohit Mehra / Krishna Mehra (Krrish); Ranbir Kapoor – Yeh Jawaani Hai Deewani as Kabir "Bunny" Thapar; Ranveer Singh – Goliyon Ki Raasleela Ram-Leela as Ram Rajari; Shahrukh Khan – Chennai Express as Rahul Mithaiwala; Sushant Singh Rajput – Kai Po Che! as Ishaan Bhatt	Deepika Padukone – Chennai Express as Meenalochni Azhagusundaram; Deepika Padukone – Goliyon Ki Raasleela Ram-Leela as Leela Sanera; Deepika Padukone – Yeh Jawaani Hai Deewani as Naina Talwar; Nimrat Kaur – The Lunchbox as Ila; Shraddha Kapoor – Aashiqui 2 as Aarohi Keshav Shirke; Sonakshi Sinha – Lootera as Pakhi Roy Chaudhary
Best Actor in a Supporting Role	Best Actress in a Supporting Role
Aditya Roy Kapur – Yeh Jawaani Hai Deewani as Avinash "Avi" Arora; Anupam Kher – Special 26 as P. K. Sharma; Nawazuddin Siddiqui – The Lunchbox as Shaikh; Pawan Malhotra – Bhaag Milkha Bhaag as Hawaldar (Constable) Gurudev Singh; Saurabh Shukla – Jolly LLB as Justice Tripathi	Divya Dutta – Bhaag Milkha Bhaag as Ishri Kaur; Kalki Koechlin – Yeh Jawaani Hai Deewani as Aditi Mehra; Kangana Ranaut – Krrish 3 as Kaya; Richa Chadda – Goliyon Ki Raasleela Ram-Leela as Rasila; Shruti Haasan – D-Day as Suraiya; Swara Bhaskar – Raanjhanaa as Bindiya
Male Debutant Star	Female Debutant Star
Dhanush – Raanjhanaa as Kundan	Vaani Kapoor – Shuddh Desi Romance as Tara
Best Performance in a Comic Role	Best Performance in a Negative Role
Arshad Warsi – Jolly LLB as Jagdish Tyagi (Jolly); Ritesh Deshmukh – Grand Masti as Amar Saxena; Varun Sharma – Fukrey as Choocha (Dilip Singh)	Rishi Kapoor – Aurangzeb as DCP Ravikant, HPS; Rishi Kapoor – D-Day as Iqbal Seth alias Goldman; Supriya Pathak – Goliyon Ki Raasleela Ram-Leela as Dhankor Baa Sanera; Vivek Oberoi – Krrish 3 as Kaal
Best Story	Debutant Director
Prasoon Joshi – Bhaag Milkha Bhaag; Pubali Chaudhari, Supratik Sen, Abhishek Kapoor, Chetan Bhagat – Kai Po Che!; Ritesh Batra – The Lunchbox	

=== Special awards ===
Category	Recipient(s)
IIFA Award for Outstanding Contribution to Indian Cinema	Shatrughan Sinha
IIFA Award for Outstanding Achievement in International Cinema	John Travolta
IIFA Award for Entertainer of the Year	Deepika Padukone

=== Musical awards ===
Best Music Direction	Best Lyrics
Aashiqui 2 – Mithoon, Ankit Tiwari, Jeet Ganguly; Bhaag Milkha Bhaag – Shankar–Ehsaan–Loy; Yeh Jawaani Hai Deewani – Pritam Chakraborty	Tum Hi Ho from Aashiqui 2 – Mithoon; "O Rangrez" from Bhaag Milkha Bhaag – Prasoon Joshi; "Sunn Raha Hai" from Aashiqui 2 – Sandeep Nath
Best Male Playback Singer	Best Female Playback Singer
Arijit Singh for Tum Hi Ho – Aashiqui 2; Ankit Tiwari for "Sunn Raha Hai" – Aashiqui 2; Siddharth Mahadevan for "Zinda" – Bhaag Milkha Bhaag	Shreya Ghoshal for Sunn Raha Hai – Aashiqui 2; Bhoomi Trivedi for "Ram Chahe Leela" – Goliyon Ki Raasleela Ram-Leela; Monali Thakur for "Sawar Loon" – Lootera; Shreya Ghoshal for "O Rangrez" – Bhaag Milkha Bhaag
Best Sound Design	Best Background Score
Nakul Kamte – Bhaag Milkha Bhaag	Shankar–Ehsaan–Loy – Bhaag Milkha Bhaag

=== Technical awards ===
Best Action	Best Special Effects
Sham Kaushal & Tony Ching Siu Tung – Krrish 3	Keitan Yadav & Haresh Hingorani (Red Chillies VFX) – Krrish 3
Best Choreography	Best Cinematography
Remo D'Souza – Yeh Jawaani Hai Deewani	Binod Pradhan – Bhaag Milkha Bhaag
Best Costume Design	Best Dialogue
Dolly Ahluwalia – Bhaag Milkha Bhaag	Prasoon Joshi – Bhaag Milkha Bhaag
Best Editing	Best Makeup
P. S. Bharti – Bhaag Milkha Bhaag	Vikram Gaikwad – Bhaag Milkha Bhaag
Best Production Design	Best Screenplay
Wasiq Khan – Goliyon Ki Raasleela Ram-Leela	Prasoon Joshi – Bhaag Milkha Bhaag
Best Sound Mixing	Best Sound Recording
Anup Dev – Chennai Express, Debajit Changmai – Bhaag Milkha Bhaag	Vinod Verma for "Lungi Dance" – Chennai Express

== Hindi Films with multiple nominations ==
- 19: Bhaag Milkha Bhaag
- 8: Goliyon Ki Raasleela Ram-Leela
- 7: Yeh Jawaani Hai Deewani, Krrish 3 and Aashiqui 2
- 6: Chennai Express
- 4: Kai Po Che!
- 3: The Lunchbox
- 2: D-Day, Lootera and Jolly LLB

Films with multiple nominations
Nominations	Film
10	Bhaag Milkha Bhaag
7	Aashiqui 2
7	Goliyon Ki Raasleela Ram-Leela
7	Yeh Jawaani Hai Deewani
5	Krrish 3
4	Chennai Express
4	Kai Po Che!
3	The Lunchbox
2	D-Day
2	Jolly LLB
2	Lootera

Films with multiple awards
Awards	Film
14	Bhaag Milkha Bhaag
4	Aashiqui 2
3	Chennai Express
2	Krrish 3
2	Yeh Jawaani Hai Deewani

== Hindi Films with multiple awards ==
- 14: Bhaag Milkha Bhaag
- 4: Aashiqui 2
- 3: Chennai Express
- 2: Yeh Jawaani Hai Deewani, Krrish 3

== See also ==
- International Indian Film Academy Awards
- Bollywood
- Cinema of India
