= Producers Guild Film Award for Best Male Playback Singer =

Annual Indian film award

The Producers Guild Film Award for Best Male Playback Singer (previously known as the Apsara Award for Best Male Playback Singer) is given by the producers of the film and television guild as part of its annual award ceremony to recognise the best Indian film of the year. Following its inception in 2004, no one was awarded in 2005 and 2007.

== Superlatives ==
Superlatives	Best Female Playback Singer	
Most awards	Mohit Chauhan; Arijit Singh	2
Most nominations	Arijit Singh	7
Most nominations in a single year	Arijit Singh (2015, 2016)	3
Most consecutive awards		

== Winners and Nominees ==
=== 2000s ===
- 2004 Sonu Nigam - Kal Ho Naa Ho Kal Ho Naa Ho
  - Abhijeet- Tauba Chalte Chalte
  - Udit Narayan - Idhar Chala Koi... Mil Gaya
  - Adnan Sami - Ishq Hota Nahi Joggers Park
  - Kailash Kher - Allah Ke Bande Waisa Bhi Hota Hai Part II
- 2005 - no award
- 2006 Kunal Ganjawala - Bheegey Honth Tere Murder
  - Udit Narayan - Main Yahan Hoon Veer-Zaara
  - Atif Aslam - Woh Lamhe Zeher
  - Rahat Nusrat Fateh Ali Khan - Jiya Dhadhak Kalyug
  - Shaan - Main Aisa Kyon Hoon Lakshya
- 2007 – No award
- 2008 Shaan - Jab Se Tere Naina Saawariya
  - KK - Ankhon Mein Teri Om Shanti Om
  - Sonu Nigam - Tainu Leke Salaam-E-Ishq
  - Soham - In Dino Life in a... Metro
  - Sukhvinder Singh - Chak De India Chak De! India
- 2009 Shankar Mahadevan – Maa Taare Zameen Par
  - Atif Aslam – Pehli Nazar Mein Race
  - Rashid Ali – Kabhi Kabhi Aditi Jaane Tu Ya Jaane Na
  - KK – Khuda Jaane Bachna Ae Haseeno
  - A.R. Rahman – Khwaja Jodhaa Akbar

=== 2010s ===
- 2010 Mohit Chauhan – Ye Dooriyan Love Aaj Kal
  - Javed Ali & Sonu Nigam – Guzarish Ghajini
  - Roop Kumar Rathod – Tujh Men Rab Dikhta Hai Rab Ne Bana Di Jodi
  - Sukhwinder Singh & Vishal Dadlani – Dhan Te Nan Kaminey
  - Shankar Mahadevan – Wake Up Sid Wake Up Sid
- 2011 Rahat Fateh Ali Khan - Dil Toh Bachcha Hai Ji' - Ishqiya
  - Mohit Chauhan - Pee Loon - Once Upon a Time in Mumbai
  - Rahat Fateh Ali Khan - Tere Mast Mast Do Nain Dabangg
  - KK - 'Sajde Kiye' Khatta Meetha
  - Aadesh Shrivastava - Mora Piya Raajneeti
  - Shafqat Amanat Ali - 'Tere Naina' - My Name Is Khan
- 2012 Mohit Chauhan - Sadda Haq Rockstar
  - Rahat Fateh Ali Khan - Teri Meri Bodyguard
  - Muhammad Irfaan - Phir Mohabbat Murder 2
  - Akon - Chammak Challo Ra.One
  - Mohit Chauhan - Naadan Parindey Rockstar
  - Tochi Raina - Saibo Shor in the City
- 2013 Ayushmann Khurrana - "Paani Da Rang" - Vicky Donor
  - Amitabh Bachchan - "Ekla Chalo Re" - Kahaani 2
  - Mika Singh & Wajid - "Chinta Ta Ta Chita Chita" - Rowdy Rathore
  - Mohit Chauhan - "Ala Barfi" - Barfi!
  - Neeraj Shridhar - "Tumhi Ho Bandhu" - Cocktail
  - Nikhil Paul George - "Main Kya Karoon" - Barfi!
- 2014 Arijit Singh - "Tum Hi Ho" - Aashiqui 2
  - Ankit Tiwari - "Sunn Raha Hai" - Aashiqui 2
  - Atif Aslam - "Jeene Laga Hoon" - Ramaiya Vastavaiya
  - Amit Trivedi & Mohan Kanan - "Manjha" - Kai Po Che!
  - Aditya Narayan - "Tattad Tattad" & "Ishqyaun Dhishqyuan" - Goliyon Ki Raasleela Ram-Leela
  - Siddharth Mahadevan - "Malang" - Dhoom 3
- 2015 Ankit Tiwari - "Galliyan" - Ek Villain
  - Labh Janjua - "London Thumakda" - Queen
  - Arijit Singh - "Aa Raat Bhar" - Heropanti
  - Arijit Singh - "Samjhawan" - Humpty Sharma Ki Dulhania
  - Sukhwinder Singh - "Bismil" - Haider
  - Arijit Singh - "Humdard" - Ek Villain
  - Shaan - "Chaar Kadam" - PK
- 2016 Arijit Singh - "Hamari Adhuri Kahani" - Hamari Adhuri Kahani
  - Arijit Singh - "Khamoshiyan" - Khamoshiyan
  - Arijit Singh - "Sooraj Dooba Hain" - Roy
