= Sunn Raha Hai =

2013 Hindi song

Song by Ankit Tiwari

from the album Aashiqui 2
- Language: Hindi
- Released: 29 March 2013
- Studio: Phat Box, Andheri, Mumbai
- Genre: Pop; rock; filmi
- Length: 6:30
- Label: T-Series
- Composer: Ankit Tiwari
- Lyricist: Sandeep Nath
- Producers: Bhushan Kumar; Krishan Kumar

Aashiqui 2 track listing
- 1. "Tum Hi Ho"; 2. "Sunn Raha Hai"; 3. "Chahun Main Ya Naa"; 4. "Hum Mar Jaayenge"; 5. "Meri Aashiqui"; 6. "Piya Aaye Na"; 7. "Aasan Nahin Yahan"; 8. "Sunn Raha Hai" (Female Version); 9. "Bhula Dena"; 10. "Milne Hai Mujhse Aayi"; 11. "Aashiqui (The Love Theme)

Music video
- "Sunn Raha Hai" on YouTube

Sunn Raha Hai (transl. Are you listening?) is a song from the 2013 Hindi film Aashiqui 2. Composed by Ankit Tiwari, the song is sung by Tiwari, with lyrics penned by Sandeep Nath. This song along with "Tum Hi Ho" became very popular and was a chartbuster all over India. The song is picturised on Rahul Jaykar (Aditya Roy Kapoor) performing at a music concert, while the female version of the song is picturised on Aarohi Keshav Shirke (Shraddha Kapoor) performing at a local bar.

== Development ==
The song was recorded by Ankit Tiwari at the Phat Box Studios, Andheri (West), Mumbai. Pankaj Borah is the recording engineer of this track. There is also a female version of this track sung by Shreya Ghoshal which was also well received. Though the female version of the song uses the same lyrics and music as that of the male version, the difference lies in the instruments used. While the female version is supported by instruments like ghatam, flute, santoor and acoustic guitar, the male version features electronic distortion guitar, bass guitar, zitar and drums. Ankit wanted late KK to sing the song, but Mahesh Bhatt insisted that removing Ankit's voice would diminish its essence. Following Bhatt's advice, they decided to proceed with Tiwari's vocals.

== Critical reception ==
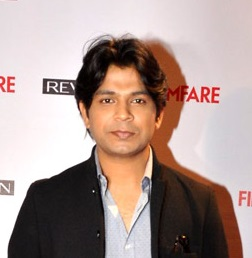
Tiwari's voice and composition was critically acclaimed.

Sunn Raha Hai generally received positive reviews from critics. Times of India wrote− Singer Ankit Tiwari has done a fine job with Sunn raha hai. He maintains the standard created by Shreya in the female version. Ankit's voice suits the lyrics, but it is too lengthy to keep you hooked.

== Awards and nominations ==
| Year | Nominee | Award | Category | Result | Ref. |
|---|---|---|---|---|---|
| 2014 | Ankit Tiwari | Mirchi Music Awards | Upcoming Music Composer of the Year | Won | |
| 2014 | Ankit Tiwari | Mirchi Music Awards | Upcoming Male Vocalist of the Year | Won | |
| 2014 | Ankit Tiwari | Mirchi Music Awards | Best Song (Listeners' Choice Award) | Won | |
| 2014 | Ankit Tiwari | GiMA Awards | Best Music Debut | Won | |
| 2014 | Ankit Tiwari | GiMA Awards | Best Male Playback Singer | Nominated | |
| 2014 | Ankit Tiwari | IIFA Awards | Best Male Playback Singer | Nominated | |
| 2014 | Ankit Tiwari | Star Guild Awards | Best Male Playback Singer | Nominated | |
| 2014 | Sandeep Nath | Zee Cine Awards | Best Lyrics | Nominated | |

== Female version ==
"Sunn Raha Hai (Female Version)"

Song by Shreya Ghoshal

from the album Aashiqui 2
- Released: 29 March 2013
- Studio: Phat Box, Andheri, Mumbai
- Genre: Filmi
- Length: 5:14
- Label: T-Series
- Composer: Ankit Tiwari
- Lyricist: Sandeep Nath
- Producers: Bhushan Kumar; Krishan Kumar

Music video
- "Sunn Raha Hai (Female Version)" on YouTube

Sunn Raha Hai (Female Version) (transl. Are you listening?) is a Hindi song from the 2013 super-hit Bollywood film, Aashiqui 2. Composed by Ankit Tiwari, the song is sung by Shreya Ghoshal, with lyrics penned by Sandeep Nath.

=== Development ===
The female version of "Sunn Raha Hai" was recorded by Shreya Ghoshal at the Phat Box Studios, Andheri (West), Mumbai. Pankaj Borah is the recording engineer of this track. Though the female version of the song uses the same lyrics and music as that of the male version, the difference lies in the instruments used. While the female version is supported by instruments like ghatam, flute, santoor and acoustic guitar, the male version features electronic distortion guitar, zitar and drums.

=== Critical reception ===
The female version of "Sunn Raha Hai" was acclaimed by critics, though it even got some average comments. Besides the music and lyrics, Ghoshal's rendition was also acclaimed.

Reviewers of The Times of India wrote− Shreya has sung "Sun Raha Hai" effortlessly. However, except for the singer, there is nothing interesting to write about it. The lyrics are unimpressive, while the music is dull. Rajiv Vijayakar of Bollywood Hungama remarked− It is Shreya who comes up trumps with her more Indian version, where we even have brief aalaaps. The flute, the santoor and even the ghatam pervade the lovely number while keeping the rhythm intact. And Sandeep Nath's lines are truly ingenious! Shresht Poddar of High on Score remarked− Shreya has added yet another notch in her ever growing belt with this track. No wonder she is called the modern nightingale of India! Critics of Bollymeaning.com wrote− And now, when we needed a girl to sing "Sunn Raha Hai Na Tu", they finally bring in Shreya Ghoshal. Really, the song that was in rock mood, Shreya is made to sing in all typical Indian girl style with sounds of bangles, ghatam, and lot of what-was-that-'90s-instrument-really. Very well sung, but I still like the guy version a lot more. And guys, it's ataayein. Karam ki adaayein would mean styles of grace. Seriously, lyrics fail! Reviewers of In.com said− Shreya Ghoshal takes her turn with Ankit Tiwari's 'Sunn Raha Hai', and flutes and santoor are added to the mix. Ghoshal makes no mistakes, but Ankit's original has a stronger impact than this softer version.

=== Accolades ===
| Year | Nominee | Award | Category | Result |
|---|---|---|---|---|
| 2014 | Shreya Ghoshal | Filmfare Awards | Best Female Playback Singer | Nominated |
| 2014 | Shreya Ghoshal | IIFA Awards | Best Female Playback Singer | Won |
| 2014 | Shreya Ghoshal | Zee Cine Awards | Best Playback Singer – Female | Won |
| 2014 | Shreya Ghoshal | Screen Awards | Best Female Playback Singer | Won |
| 2014 | Shreya Ghoshal | Mirchi Music Awards | Vocalist (Female) of the Year | Nominated |
| 2014 | Shreya Ghoshal | Gaana Awards | Most Popular Singer (female) | Won |
| 2014 | Shreya Ghoshal | Global Indian Music Awards (GiMA) | Best Playback Singer − Female | Won |

== Other versions ==
"Sunn Raha Hai" (both male and female versions) was remade in Telugu as "Vintunnavva Nestham", for the 2014 film Nee Jathaga Nenundali; which is an official Telugu remake of Aashiqui 2. The lyrics were penned by Chandra Bose. Both Ankit Tiwari and Shreya Ghoshal return to sing their respective versions of the song in Telugu.

Tiwari sang a new version of this song as "Sunn Raha Hai - Reloaded" which was released as a single in 2015, the music video of which can be found on the T-Series YouTube channel.

Ghoshal sang a medley of two of her songs "Sunn Raha Hai" and "Rozana" which was composed by Rochak Kohli from the film Naam Shabana, as "Sunn Raha Hai - Rozana" on T-Series Mixtape in 2017. The music of the medley was directed by Abhijit Vaghani.
