= IIFA Award for Best Male Playback Singer =

International Indian Film Academy Award

IIFA Award for Best Playback Singer – Male
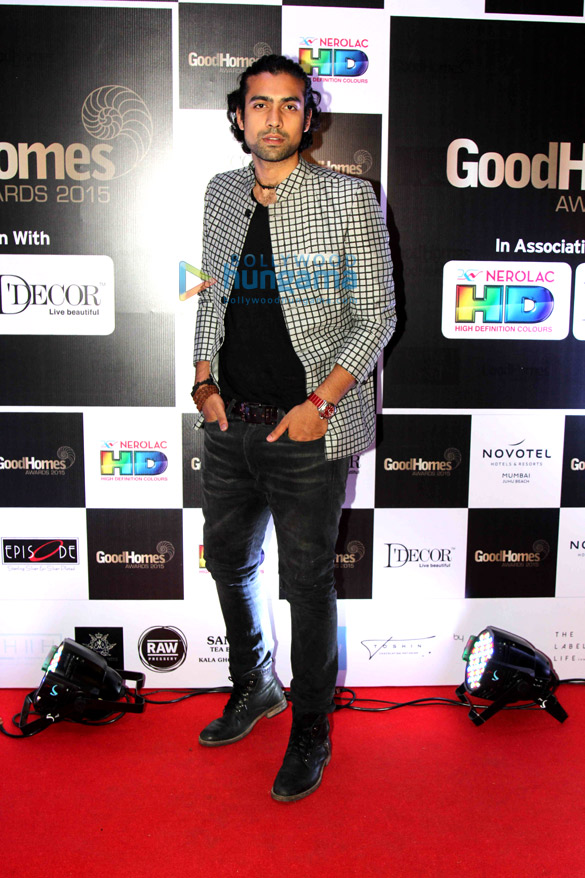
- The 2025 Recipient: Jubin Nautiyal
- Awarded for: Best Performance by a Male Playback Singer
- Country: India
- Presented by: International Indian Film Academy
- First award: Udit Narayan for "Chand Chhupa", Hum Dil De Chuke Sanam (2000)
- Currently held by: Jubin Nautiyal for "Dua", Article 370 (2025)
- Website: http://www.iifa.com

The IIFA Award for Best Male Playback Singer is chosen by the viewers and the winner is announced at the ceremony. Arijit Singh holds the record for most wins in this category (5). Singh also holds the record for most nominations (18). Udit Narayan was first ever winner of the award in first edition of the award ceremony in 2000.

== Superlatives ==
=== Multiple winners ===
- 5 Wins: Arijit Singh
- 4 Wins: Sonu Nigam
- 3 Wins: Shaan
- 2 Wins: Jubin Nautiyal

=== Multiple nominees ===
- 18 Nominations: Arijit Singh
- 11 Nominations: Udit Narayan
- 11 Nominations: Sonu Nigam
- 6 Nominations: KK
- 5 Nominations: Rahat Fateh Ali Khan, Sukhwinder Singh
- 4 Nominations: Mohit Chauhan, Shaan
- 3 Nominations: Atif Aslam, Mika Singh, Diljit Dosanjh
- 2 Nominations: B Praak, Jubin Nautiyal, Ankit Trivedi, Vishal Dadlani

Superlative	Artist	Record
Most awards	Arijit Singh	5
Most nominations	Arijit Singh	18
Most nominations without ever winning	KK	6
Most consecutive wins	Sonu Nigam (2002-2004) Arijit Singh (2018-2020)	3
Most consecutive nominations	Arijit Singh (2014-2025)	18
Most nominations in a single year	Udit Narayan (2002) Arijit Singh (2022)	3

== List of winners ==
† - indicates the performance also won the Filmfare Award
‡ - indicates the performance was also nominated for the Filmfare Award

=== 2000s ===
Year	Singer	Song	Movie
2000 (1st)
2000 (1st)	Udit Narayan†	Chand Chupa Badal Mein	Hum Dil De Chuke Sanam
2000 (1st)	KK	"Tadap Tadap"	Hum Dil De Chuke Sanam
2000 (1st)	Kumar Sanu	"Aankhon Ki Gustakhiyan"	Hum Dil De Chuke Sanam
2000 (1st)	Sonu Nigam	"Ishq Bina"	Taal
2000 (1st)	Sukhwinder Singh	"Ramta Jogi"	Taal
2001 (2nd)
2001 (2nd)	Lucky Ali	Ek Pal Ka Jeena	Kaho Naa... Pyaar Hai
2001 (2nd)	Abhijeet	"Tum Dil Ki Dhadkan Mein"	Dhadkan
2001 (2nd)	Sonu Nigam	"Panchhi Nadiyan Pawan Ke Jhoken"	Refugee
2001 (2nd)	Udit Narayan	"Aaja Mahiya"	Fiza
2001 (2nd)	Udit Narayan	"Kaho Naa... Pyaar Hai"	Kaho Naa... Pyaar Hai
2002 (3rd)
2002 (3rd)	Sonu Nigam	Suraj Hua Maddham	Kabhi Khushi Kabhie Gham ‡
2002 (3rd)	Sonu Nigam	"You Are My Soniya"	Kabhi Khushi Kabhie Gham
2002 (3rd)	Srinivas	"Kaisi Hai Yeh Rut"	Dil Chahta Hai
2002 (3rd)	Udit Narayan	"Udja Kale Kawan - Folk"	Gadar: Ek Prem Katha ‡
2002 (3rd)	Udit Narayan	"Bole Chudiyan"	Kabhi Khushi Kabhie Gham
2002 (3rd)	Udit Narayan	"Mitwa"	Lagaan †
2003 (4th)
2003 (4th)	Sonu Nigam	Saathiya	Saathiya †
2003 (4th)	KK	"Bardaasht Nahi Kar Sakta"	Humraaz
2003 (4th)	Kumar Sanu	"Sanam Mere Humraaz"	Humraaz
2003 (4th)	Lucky Ali	"Aa Bhi Jaa Aa Bhi Jaa"	Sur – The Melody of Life
2003 (4th)	Udit Narayan	"Woh Chand Jaisi Ladki"	Devdas
2004 (5th)
2004 (5th)	Sonu Nigam	Kal Ho Naa Ho	Kal Ho Naa Ho †
2004 (5th)	Amitabh Bachchan	"Main Yahan Tu Wahan"	Baghban
2004 (5th)	KK	"Tu Aashiqui Hai"	Jhankaar Beats
2004 (5th)	Udit Narayan	"Koi Mil Gaya"	Koi... Mil Gaya
2004 (5th)	Udit Narayan	"Tere Naam"	Tere Naam ‡
2005 (6th)
2005 (6th)	Kunal Ganjawala	Bheegay Hooth Tere	Murder †
2005 (6th)	Sonu Nigam	"Main Hoon Na"	Main Hoon Na ‡
2005 (6th)	Udit Narayan	"Aakhe Bandh Karke"	Aitraaz
2005 (6th)	Udit Narayan	"Lal Dupatta"	Mujhse Shaadi Karogi
2005 (6th)	Udit Narayan	"Yeh Tara Woh Tara"	Swades
2006 (7th)
2006 (7th)	Himesh Reshammiya	Aashiq Banaya Apne	Aashiq Banaya Apne †
2006 (7th)	Atif Aslam	"Woh Lamhe Woh Baatein"	Zeher ‡
2006 (7th)	Rahat Fateh Ali Khan	"Jiya Dhadak Dhadak Jaye"	Kalyug
2006 (7th)	Shaan and KK	"Dus Bahane"	Dus
2006 (7th)	Sonu Nigam	"Piya Bole"	Parineeta
2007 (8th)
2007 (8th)	Shaan	Chand Sifarish	Fanaa †
2007 (8th)	A. R. Rahman and Naresh Iyer	"Ru Baroo"	Rang De Basanti
2007 (8th)	KK	"Tu Hi Meri Shab Hai"	Gangster
2007 (8th)	Sonu Nigam	"Kabhi Alvida Naa Kehna"	Kabhi Alvida Naa Kehna
2007 (8th)	Zubeen Garg	"Ya Ali"	Gangster ‡
2008 (9th)
2008 (9th)	Shaan	Jab Se Tere Naina	Saawariya †
2008 (9th)	Neeraj Shridhar	"Bhool Bhulaiyaa"	Bhool Bhulaiyaa
2008 (9th)	KK	"Ajab Si"	Om Shanti Om ‡
2008 (9th)	Sukhwinder Singh	"Chak De! India	Chak De! India ‡
2008 (9th)	Wajid Ali	"Soni De Nakhre"	Partner
2009 (10th)
2009 (10th)	Javed Ali	Jashan-e-Baharaa	Jodhaa Akbar
2009 (10th)	Atif Aslam	"Pehli Nazar Mein"	Race
2009 (10th)	Farhan Akhtar	"Socha Hai"	Rock On!! ‡
2009 (10th)	KK	"Khuda Jaane"	Bachna Ae Haseeno ‡
2009 (10th)	Sukhwinder Singh	"Haule Haule"	Rab Ne Bana Di Jodi †

=== 2010s ===
Year	Singer	Song	Movie
2010 (11th)
2010 (11th)	Shaan	"Behti Hawa Sa Tha Woh"	3 Idiots
2010 (11th)	Atif Aslam	"Tu Jaane Na"	Ajab Prem Ki Ghazab Kahani ‡
2010 (11th)	Mohit Chauhan	"Masakali"	Delhi-6 †
2010 (11th)	Rahat Fateh Ali Khan	"Ajj Din Chadheya"	Love Aaj Kal ‡
2010 (11th)	Sonu Nigam	"All Izz Well"	3 Idiots
2010 (11th)	Vishal Dadlani & Sukhwinder Singh	"Dhan Te Nan"	Kaminey ‡
2011 (12th)
2011 (12th)	Rahat Fateh Ali Khan	"Tere Mast Mast Do Nain"	Dabangg
2011 (12th)	Mohit Chauhan	"Pee Loon"	Once Upon A Time In Mumbaai ‡
2011 (12th)	Rahat Fateh Ali Khan	"Dil To Bachcha Hai"	Ishqiya †
2011 (12th)	Shafqat Amanat Ali	"Bin Tere"	I Hate Luv Storys ‡
2011 (12th)	Shankar Mahadevan	"Uff Teri Adaa"	Karthik Calling Karthik
2011 (12th)	Vishal Dadlani	"Adhoore"	Break Ke Baad
2012 (13th)
2012 (13th)	Mohit Chauhan	Nadaan Parindey"	Rockstar
2012 (13th)	Ash King	"I Love You"	Bodyguard
2012 (13th)	Mika Singh	"Subha Hone Na De"	Desi Boyz
2012 (13th)	Kamal Khan	"Ishq Sufiana"	The Dirty Picture
2012 (13th)	Rahat Fateh Ali Khan	"Teri Meri"	Bodyguard ‡
2013 (14th)
2013 (14th)	Sonu Nigam	"Abhi Mujh Mein Kahin"	Agneepath
2013 (14th)	Ajay Gogavale	"Deva Shree Ganesha"	Agneepath
2013 (14th)	Ayushmann Khurrana	"Pani Da Rang"	Vicky Donor †
2013 (14th)	Mika Singh	"Pungi"	Agent Vinod
2013 (14th)	Nikhil Paul George	"Main Kya Karoon" ‡, "Aashiyan"	Barfi!
2014 (15th)
2014 (15th)	Arijit Singh	"Tum Hi Ho"	Aashiqui 2 †
2014 (15th)	Ankit Tiwari	"Sunn Raha Hai"	Aashiqui 2 ‡
2014 (15th)	Siddharth Mahadevan	"Zinda"	Bhaag Milkha Bhaag ‡
2015 (16th)
2015 (16th)	Ankit Tiwari	"Galliyan"	Ek Villain †
2015 (16th)	Arijit Singh	"Muskurane"	CityLights
2015 (16th)	Mika Singh	"Jumme Ki Raat"	Kick
2015 (16th)	Sukhwinder Singh	"Bismil"	Haider
2016 (17th)
2016 (17th)	Papon	"Moh Moh Ke Dhaage"	Dum Laga Ke Haisha ‡
2016 (17th)	Arijit Singh	"Hamari Adhuri Kahani"	Hamari Adhuri Kahani
2016 (17th)	Arijit Singh	"Sooraj Dooba Hain"	Roy †
2017 (18th)
2017 (18th)	Amit Mishra	"Bulleya"	Ae Dil Hai Mushkil ‡
2017 (18th)	Armaan Malik	"Besabriyaan"	M.S. Dhoni: The Untold Story
2017 (18th)	Arijit Singh	"Channa Mereya"	Ae Dil Hai Mushkil ‡
2017 (18th)	Diljit Dosanjh	"Ikk Kudi"	Udta Punjab
2018 (19th)
2018 (19th)	Arijit Singh	"Hawayein"	Jab Harry Met Sejal
2019 (20th)
2019 (20th)	Arijit Singh	"Ae Watan"	Raazi †
2019 (20th)	Abhay Jodhpurkar	"Mera Naam Tu"	Zero ‡
2019 (20th)	Amit Trivedi	"Nina Da Kya Kasoor"	Andhadhun
2019 (20th)	Arijit Singh	"Tera Yaar Hoon Main"	Sonu Ke Titu Ki Sweety ‡
2019 (20th)	Sukhwinder Singh	"Kar Har Maidan Fateh"	Sanju

=== 2020s ===
Year	Singer	Song	Movie
2020 (21st)
2020 (21st)	Arijit Singh	"Ghungroo"	War
2020 (21st)	Arijit Singh	"Dil Hi Toh Hai"	The Sky Is Pink
2020 (21st)	B Praak	"Teri Mitti"	Kesari ‡
2020 (21st)	Divine, Naezy and Ranveer Singh	"Mere Gully Mein"	Gully Boy
2020 (21st)	Sachet Tandon	"Bekhayali"	Kabir Singh ‡
2021	AWARDS NOT HELD DUE TO COVID-19 PANDEMIC		
2022 (22nd)
2022 (22nd)	Jubin Nautiyal	"Raatan Lambiyan"	Shershaah
2022 (22nd)	Arijit Singh	"Lehra Do"	83
2022 (22nd)	Arijit Singh	"Rait Zara Si"	Atrangi Re
2022 (22nd)	Arijit Singh	"Aabaad Barbaad"	Ludo
2022 (22nd)	B Praak	"Mann Bharya"	Shershaah
2023 (23rd)
2023 (23rd)	Arijit Singh	"Kesariya"	Brahmāstra: Part One – Shiva
2023 (23rd)	Aditya Rao	"Behene Do"	Rocketry: The Nambi Effect
2023 (23rd)	Arijit Singh	"Deva Deva"	Brahmāstra: Part One – Shiva
2023 (23rd)	Mohit Chauhan	"Gehraiyaan (Reprise)"	Gehraiyaan
2023 (23rd)	Kanish Seth	"Rangisari"	Jugjugg Jeeyo
2024 (24th)
2024 (24th)	Bhupinder Babbal	"Arjan Vailly"	Animal †
2024 (24th)	Arijit Singh	"Satranga"	Animal ‡
2024 (24th)	Arijit Singh	"Jhoome Jo Pathaan"	Pathaan
2024 (24th)	Diljit Dosanjh	"Banda"	Dunki
2024 (24th)	Vishal Mishra	"Pehle Bhi Main"	Animal
2025 (25th)
2025 (25th)	Jubin Nautiyal	"Dua"	Article 370
2025 (25th)	Arijit Singh	"Sajni"	Laapataa Ladies
2025 (25th)	Diljit Dosanjh, Badshah	"Naina"	Crew
2025 (25th)	Karan Aujla	"Tauba Tauba"	Bad Newz
2025 (25th)	Mitraz	"Akhiyaan Gulaab"	Teri Baaton Mein Aisa Uljha Jiya

== See also ==
- IIFA Awards
