= Sandeep Nath =

Indian lyricist, screenwriter, composer, director, singer, and producer

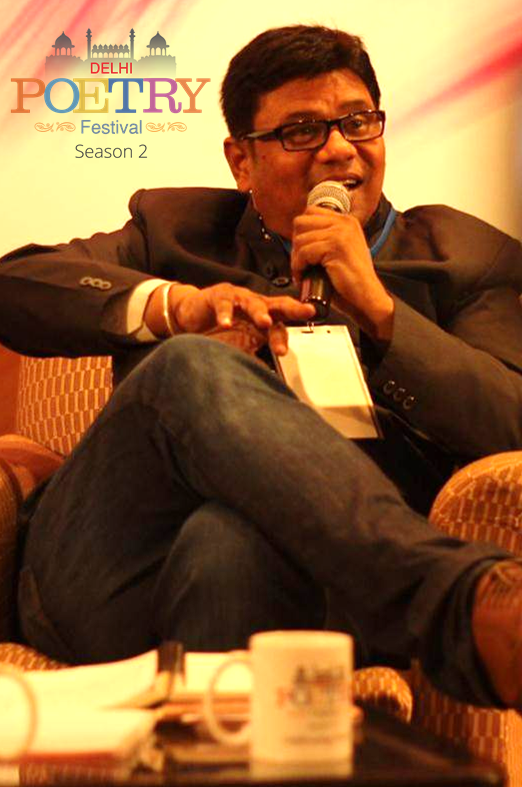
- Sandeep Nath at Delhi Poetry Festival - Season II on 12 January 2014 New Delhi
- Born: Uttar Pradesh, India
- Occupations: Lyricist, screenwriter, composer, director, singer, and producer.
- Website: http://www.sandeepnath.in/

Sandeep Nath is a Bollywood lyricist, screenwriter, composer, director, singer, and producer.

He started his literary career as a poet and singer at the age of eighteen. He has completed two books, Mujhko Kuch Bhi Naam Doh (a collection of Hindi poetry) and Darpan Ab Bhi Andha Hai (a collection of Ghazals). His poetry has been selected in Kabita Parabasey, an anthology of Bengali poems written by the poets from outside Bengal and published by Bangiya Maitri Samiti Mumbai.

During his Indian film career, he wrote lyrics for more than eighty well known Bollywood films, he is most known for his work in films like Madhur Bhandarkar's Page 3 (2005) and Corporate (2006), Sanjay Leela Bhansali's Saawariya (2007), Tigmanshu Dhulia's Paan Singh Tomar (film) (2012) and Bullet Raja, Mohit Suri's Aashiqui 2 (2013), Rohit Shetty's Singham Returns (2014), Bhushan Patel's ALONE (2015), Vikramjit Singh's Roy (2015), Deepak Tijori's Do lafzon ki kahani (2016), Tigmanshu Dhulia's Raag Desh (2017), and Saheb, Biwi Aur Gangster 3 (2018), Bhushan Patel's Amavas (2019), and Rajiv Ruia's Ghunghat (2026).

== Early life and education ==
Sandeep Nath was born and brought up in a Bengali family in Uttar Pradesh. Sandeep Nath is a Law graduate. He studied in different cities of Uttar Pradesh India as Prayagraj, Kanpur, Moradabad, Dhampur, and Chandpur. He worked as guest faculty for master classes in filmmaking at PDFTI.

== Screenwriting ==
He began his screenwriting career with television dramas such as Afsar Bitiya (Zee TV) and Ek Ghar Banaunga (Star Plus). In 2025, he expanded his portfolio with the films Love Karu Yaaa Shaadi and Vijeyta, serving as both screenwriter and music director for both projects.

== Books ==
Mujhko Kuch Bhi Naam Do – A collection of Hindi poetries (1997)
Darpan Ab Bhi Andha Hai – A collection of Hindi ghazals (1998)
Musings: Mosaic – Featured 53 poets in total.
Inklinks – Featured 153 poets in total.

== Selected filmography ==
- Bhoot (2003)
- Paisa Vasool (2004)
- Ek Hasina Thi (2004)
- Rakht (2004)
- Agnipankh (2004)
- James (2005)
- Page 3 (2005)
- Sarkar (2005)
- Corporate (2006)
- Game (2006)
- Katputtli (2006)
- Risk (2007)
- Undertrial (2007)
- Saawariya (2007)
- Sarkar Raj (2008) - 7 songs
- Phoonk (2008)
- Fashion (2008)
- Zor Lagaa Ke...Haiya (2009)
- Jail (2009)
- Fox (2009)
- Accident on Hill Road (2009)
- Kandahar (2010)
- Saheb Biwi Aur Gangster (2011)
- I am Singh (2011)
- Naughty @ 40 (2011)
- Ghost (2012)
- Ata Pata Laapata (2012)
- Sadda Adda (2012)
- Paan Singh Tomar (2012)
- Dee Saturday Night (2013)
- Saheb, Biwi Aur Gangster Returns (2013)
- Aashiqui 2 (2013)
- Bullet Raja (2013)
- Samrat & Co. (2014)
- Singham Returns (2014)
- Ekkees Toppon Ki Salaami (2014)
- Spark
- Alone (2015)
- Roy (2015)
- Charlie Kay Chakkar Mein (2015)
- Yaara Silly Silly (2015)
- Do Lafzon Ki Kahani (2016)
- Nawabzaade (2018)
- Amavas (2019)
- The Purvanchal Files (2023)
- Gabru Gang (2024)
- Love Karu Yaaa Shaadi (2025)
- Vijeyta (2025)
- Ghunghat (2026)
- Misaal (2026)

== Awards and nominations ==
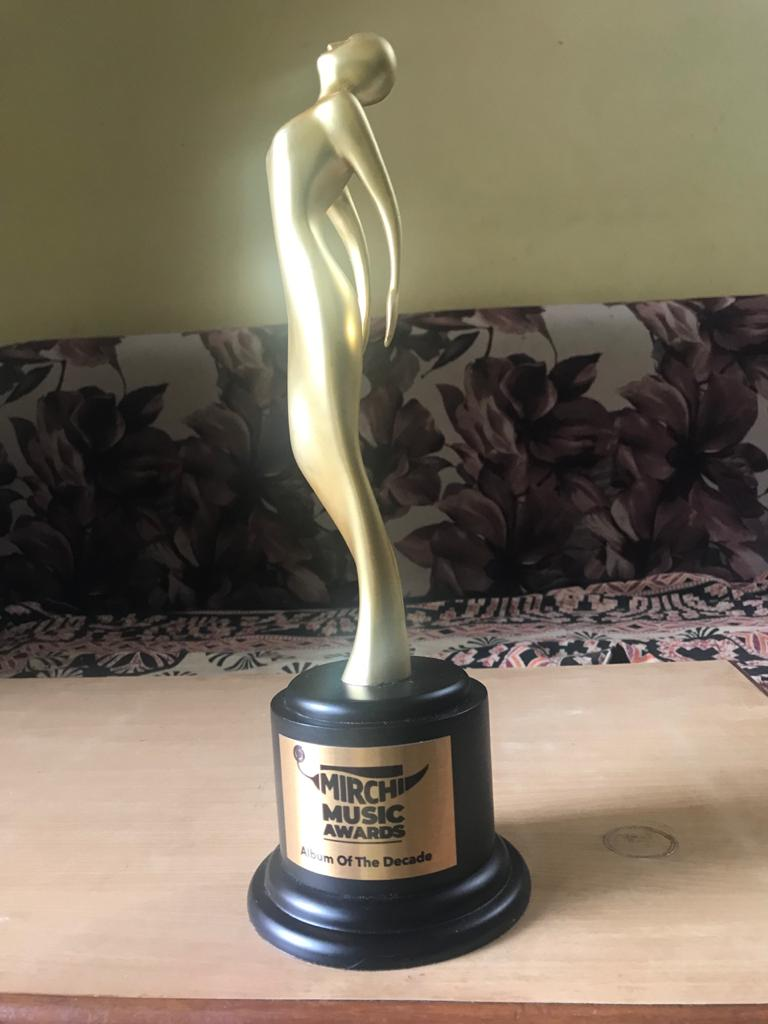

Year	Film	Award	Category	Result
2006	Page 3	Stardust Awards	Standout Performance By Lyricist	Nominated
2008	Saawariya	Stardust Awards	Standout Performance By Lyricist	Won
2008	Saawariya	Apsara Awards	Best Lyrics	Nominated
2014	Aashiqui 2	Zee Cine Awards	Best Lyrics	Nominated
2014	Aashiqui 2	Mirchi Music Awards	Lyricist of the Year	Nominated
2014	Aashiqui 2	Mirchi Music Awards	Listeners choice song of the year	Won
2014	Aashiqui 2	Mirchi Music Awards	Listeners choice album of the year	Won
2014	Aashiqui 2	Mirchi Music Awards	Album of the year	Won
2014	Aashiqui 2	15th IIFA Awards	Lyrics	Nominated
2014	Sunn Raha Hai' – Aashiqui 2	GiMA Award for Best Film Song	Best Film Song	Nominated
2016	Roy	Mirchi Music Awards	Album of The Year	Nominated
2016	Roy	Mirchi Music Awards	Listener's Choice Album of The Year	Won
2021	Aashiqui 2	Winners Hindi 2021 - Mirchi Music Awards	Listener's Choice - Album of the decade	Won
