= Ankit Tiwari =

Indian singer

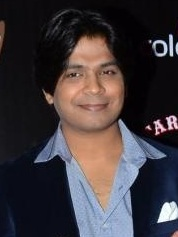
- Ankit Tiwari during Dussera celebration at Andheri Durgautsav

Background information
- Born: 6 March 1986 (age 40); Kanpur, Uttar Pradesh, India
- Genres: Film Score, Playback Singing, R&B/Soul
- Occupations: Playback singer, music composer, music director
- Years active: 2010–present

Ankit Tiwari is an Indian playback singer, live performer, music director, and composer. His career began upon meeting Pradeep Sarkar where he got a chance to work on jingles and started composing background music for television programmes. Subsequently, he was offered to compose music for Do Dooni Chaar (2010) and Saheb, Biwi Aur Gangster (2011), where he started his singing career with the song he composed for the latter.

In 2014, he collaborated with Mohit Suri for Ek Villain, where he composed and sang the song "Galliyan" for which he received two nominations in Filmfare Awards, winning Best Male Playback Singer, which is the only Filmfare Award won by someone other than Arijit Singh from 2014 to 2020. He also recorded the song "O Yara" for the Pakistani film, Bin Roye.

== Life and career ==
=== 1986–2007: Early life ===
Tiwari was born in Kanpur, Uttar Pradesh. His parents own a music troupe in Kanpur called "Raju Suman and Party" which performs at religious convocations. His mother is a devotional singer. Though his parents wanted him to complete his studies first, his inclination towards music led them to decide on training him professionally. He trained in classical music from Vinod Kumar Dwivedi before training in piano, Dhrupad and Western vocals. He instituted at and won several local music competitions during the time. He used to work as a production head at a radio station in Gwalior, before he moved to Mumbai in December 2007 along with his brother Ankur Tiwari.

=== 2008–11: Beginnings and early releases ===
In Mumbai, Tiwari met Pradeep Sarkar who was working on a film at that time. Though the film got shelved, Sarkar gave him, along with other musicians, a chance to work on jingles. It was then he composed a couple of background scores for the television programmes. Tiwari met Habib Faisal, who offered him to compose the music for his directorial debut film Do Dooni Chaar which was then released in 2010. Later for producer Tigmanshu Dhulia he composed the theme song of Saheb, Biwi Aur Gangster (2011). With this film, Ankit Tiwari made his singing debut where he rendered the song "Saheb Bada Hathila" along with Vipin Aneja.

=== 2012-2022 ===
In 2012, Ankit Tiwari narrated the song "Sunn Raha Hai" to Mahesh Bhatt and Mohit Suri, the director of the film Aashiqui 2. The song was also recorded in his voice and the female-version was rendered by Shreya Ghoshal. Apart from receiving critical acclaim, the song fetched Tiwari with multiple awards and nominations. He shared his first Filmfare Award as the Best Music Director along with Mithoon and Jeet Gannguli. The team received the Best Music Director Award from other ceremonies including IIFA Awards and Zee Cine Awards. Apart from music direction, Tiwari received his second nomination in Filmfare Awards as the Best Male Playback Singer. As his second release of the year, Tiwari collaborated with Sachin Gupta—marking first song to the tunes of another composer—for the song "Aag Ka Dariya" from Issaq.

2014 began with the film Dee Saturday Night, where two of his songs, "Falsafa Mera Falsafa" and "Jhatak Ke Nacho" went mostly unnoticed with the music listeners. He then performed the track "Kaisa Hai Dard Mera" which was composed by Ismail Darbar for Subhash Ghai's Kaanchi. Ankit Tiwari composed two tracks for the film Samrat & Co., titled "Sawaalon Mein" and a party song "Tequila Wakila" where both are rendered by Shreya Ghoshal. During the year, he performed three tracks for two of Himesh Reshammiya's films, The Xposé and Action Jackson. His rendition for the song "Sheeshe Ka Samundar" from the former received critical acclaim, while "Punjabi Mast" and "Dhoom Dhaam" from the latter received negative response from critics. In July 2014, a duet with Tulsi Kumar titled "Kuch Toh Hua Hai" was released included in the film Singham Returns. The year ended with "Dil Darbadar" from PK. Apart from all the songs released during the year, the most successful track was "Galliyan" from Ek Villain. The song was a critical and commercial success; Mohar Basu from Koimoi described the song as "the most attractive song of the album" stating "Tiwari's music and voice adds the required finesse in this song and what he has made darn great!". The song fetched him several awards for the Best Male Playback Singer including from Filmfare, Star Guild and Stardust Awards. Subsequently, he received his fourth nomination in Filmfare as the Best Music Director Award at 60th Britannia Filmfare Awards. In the year, Ankit Tiwari made his debut in a Kannada film with the song "Nillu Nillu" from Dil Rangeela composed by Arjun Janya.

Tiwari composed and sung the song "Katra Katra" along with Prakriti Kakar for the film Alone (2015). They again collaborated for the song "Bheegh Loon" from Khamoshiyan. He then composed three tracks for the film Roy, "Tu Hai Ki Nahi", "Yaara Re" which is rendered by KK and "Boond Boond" performed by Tiwari himself. The unplugged version of "Tu Hai Ki Nahi" was performed by Tulsi Kumar, along with the original received mixed reactions from critics though infusion of the whistle's tune was appreciated.

In February 2022, he was a contestant in StarPlus's Smart Jodi with his wife, Pallavi Tiwari.

=== 2023 - 2024 ===
In January 2023, he released a romantic single titled 'Banda Tera Ashiq Ho Gaya', the music video of which was shot in Thailand.

In December 2024, he released an EP titled "Underrated". As part of this project he collaborated with noted Bollywood playback singer Arijit Singh on his first single "Tum Kya Ho". The music video for this single featured Bollywood actor and producer John Abraham as well as Sanjeeda Sheikh. The EP also has collaborations with other singers such as Payal Dev and Agsy.

== Artistry ==
=== Composition ===
Tiwari stated that he wants to explore different genres given the right opportunity, though it shouldn't be vulgar and should hold meaning. Satyajit from Glamsham called his second composed song "Saheb Bada Hatila" from Saheb, Biwi Aur Gangster a "rock-musical" arrangement. In his next composition "Sunn Raha Hai", the male version features electronic distortion guitar, zitar and drums while the female version is supported by instruments like ghatam, flute, santoor and acoustic guitar. The variance in composition was particularly applauded by critics.

Rajiv Vijayakar from Bollywood Hungama mentioned that Tiwari seems to be "evolving into a composer with a decent range". In the composition of the song "Galliyan" it transforms from "being slow-paced, to quickly accelerating into heavy rock music and then settling into soothing traditional Indian-themed sounds", while the unplugged version dominantly uses the acoustic guitar alongside piano. However, for his next song "Kuch Toh Hua Hai", Surabhi Redkar for Koimoi commented; "Experimentation wise, the song shows no novelty as the musical arrangements are not peculiarly impressive". According to reviewers, his last song released in 2014, "Dil Darbadar" has a huge "Galliyan" hangover and "doesn't actually fit into the scheme of things". In September 2014, Tiwari said; "People usually call me for love songs or songs of separation, which I love composing. But I don't want to restrict myself to a particular genre".

"Katra Katra" from 2015 had a similar faith with "Dil Darbadar" as the musical arrangements of both the song are similar to his earlier ventures. Redkar noted; "If only Tiwari could come up with something new [...] the only problem is that it all sounds the same". His next was a passionate and intense composition, "Bheegh Loon" which fits with the erotic thriller mood of the film. In "Tu Hai Ki Nahin" from Roy Tiwari used minimal musical arrangements mainly focusing on vocals and incorporate a whistle—first time he has used whistle as an instrument—which according to music listeners "sounds brilliant and has high recall value", while the next two tracks "Boond Boond" and "Yaara Re" were called "experimental" in terms of arrangement.

=== Influences ===
Tiwari named the singers like KK, Puerto Rican and Ricky Martin as his idols. He picked Nusrat Fateh Ali Khan as one of his inspiration and dedicated a song to him from one of his composition at MTV Unplugged 4 – Episode 06. Among the actors, Tiwari expressed his desire to dub for Shah Rukh Khan and Ranbir Kapoor.

Popular singer Rahat Fateh Ali Khan mentioned that he likes Tiwari's singing along with Arijit Singh's.

=== Voice and rendition ===
Tiwari's early two releases "Sunn Raha Hai" and "Aag Ka Dariya" represent his "young energetic and strong vocals" which was well received by the critics. "Kaisa Hai Dard Mera", despite with the similar pattern has a semi classical touch in his rendition. His one of the most successful venture "Galliyan" provided Tiwari with a high vocal range which was particularly appraised in the song though Bollywood Hungama wrote that he sings the track in a "gimmicky tenor that sounds fake". His voice and rendition was criticised in "Dil Darbadar" where IBNLive wrote; "Tiwari's choice to distort vocals using the Auto-tune software takes away the charm and rawness of a plaintive melody like "Dil Darbadar".

== Controversies ==
In May 2014, Tiwari was arrested by the Mumbai Police on a rape complaint filed by a woman, and his brother Ankur was charged with intimidating her. However, the complainant failed to support the prosecution version during the trial due to lack of evidence against him and his brother. In April 2017, both Tiwari and his brother were acquitted from all charges by the Mumbai Sessions Court.

== Personal life ==
Tiwari married Pallavi Shukla as per Hindu rituals in Kanpur on 23 February 2018. Tiwari and Pallavi had an arranged marriage as both first met on the recommendation of Ankit's grandmother. They have a daughter born on 28 December 2018.

== Television ==
Year	Show	Role	Notes
2022	Smart Jodi	Contestant	

== Awards and nominations ==
Year	Award	Category	Nominated Work	Result	Ref.
2014	Guild Awards	Best Male Playback Singer	Aashiqui 2 – "Sunn Raha Hai"	Nominated	
2015	Guild Awards	Best Male Playback Singer	Ek Villain – "Galliyan"	Won	
2015	Guild Awards	Best Music Director	Ek Villain – "Galliyan"	Won	
2013	BIG Star Entertainment Awards	Most Entertaining Music	Aashiqui 2 (shared with Mithoon, Jeet Gannguli)	Won	
2014	BIG Star Entertainment Awards	Most Entertaining Music	Ek Villain (shared with Mithoon, Rabbi Ahmed, Adnan Dhool)	Nominated	
2014	BIG Star Entertainment Awards	Most Entertaining Song	Ek Villain – "Galliyan"	Nominated	
2014	BIG Star Entertainment Awards	Most Entertaining Singer (Male)	Ek Villain – "Galliyan"	Nominated	
2014	Filmfare Awards	Best Music Director	Aashiqui 2 (shared with Mithoon, Jeet Gannguli)	Won	
2014	Filmfare Awards	Best Male Playback Singer	Aashiqui 2 – "Sunn Raha Hai"	Nominated	
2015	Filmfare Awards	Best Music Director	Ek Villain (shared with Mithoon, Soch)	Nominated	
2015	Filmfare Awards	Best Male Playback Singer	Ek Villain – "Galliyan"	Won	
2014	GiMA Awards	Best Music Debut	Aashiqui 2 – "Sunn Raha Hai"	Won	
2014	GiMA Awards	Best Film Album	Aashiqui 2 (shared with Mithoon, Jeet Gannguli)	Won	
2014	GiMA Awards	Best Music Director	Aashiqui 2 (shared with Mithoon, Jeet Gannguli)	Nominated	
2014	GiMA Awards	Best Male Playback Singer	Aashiqui 2 – "Sunn Raha Hai"	Nominated	
2014	GiMA Awards	Best Film Song		Nominated	
2015	GiMA Awards	Best Film Song	Ek Villain – "Galliyan"	Won	
2015	GiMA Awards	Best Male Playback Singer	Ek Villain – "Galliyan"	Nominated	
2015	GiMA Awards	Best Music Director	Ek Villain (shared with Mithoon)	Nominated	
2014	IIFA Awards	Best Music Director	Aashiqui 2 (shared with Mithoon, Jeet Gannguli)	Won	
2014	IIFA Awards	Best Male Playback Singer	Aashiqui 2 – "Sunn Raha Hai"	Nominated	
2013	Mirchi Music Awards	Upcoming Male Vocalist of the Year	Aashiqui 2 – "Sunn Raha Hai"	Won	
2013	Mirchi Music Awards	Upcoming Music Composer of the Year	Aashiqui 2 – "Sunn Raha Hai"	Won	
2013	Mirchi Music Awards	Best Song (Listeners' Choice Award)	Aashiqui 2 – "Sunn Raha Hai"	Won	
2013	Mirchi Music Awards	Album of the Year	Aashiqui 2 (shared with Mithoon, Jeet Gannguli)	Won	
2014	Mirchi Music Awards	Male Vocalist of the Year	Ek Villain – "Galliyan"	Nominated	
2014	Mirchi Music Awards	Music Composer of the Year	Ek Villain – "Galliyan"	Nominated	
2014	Mirchi Music Awards	Song of the Year	Ek Villain – "Galliyan"	Nominated	
2014	Mirchi Music Awards	Album of the Year	Ek Villain (shared with Mithoon, Rabbi Ahmad, Adnaan Dhool)	Nominated	
2014	Mirchi Music Awards	Album of the Year (Listener's Choice)	Ek Villain (shared with Mithoon, Rabbi Ahmad, Adnaan Dhool)	Won	
2015	Mirchi Music Awards	Album of the Year	Roy (shared with Amaal Mallik, Meet Bros, Kumaar, Abhendra Kumar Upadhyay, Sandeep Nath)	Nominated	
2015	Mirchi Music Awards	Album of the Year (Listener's Choice)	Roy (shared with Amaal Mallik, Meet Bros, Kumaar, Abhendra Kumar Upadhyay, Sandeep Nath)	Won	
2014	Screen Awards	Best Music Director	Aashiqui 2 (shared with Mithoon, Jeet Gannguli)	Nominated	
2015	Screen Awards	Best Music Director	Ek Villain (shared with Mithoon)	Won	
2015	Screen Awards	Best Male Playback Singer	Ek Villain – "Galliyan"	Nominated	
2015	Stardust Awards	Best Male Playback Singer	Ek Villain – "Galliyan"	Won	
2015	Stardust Awards	Best Music Director	Ek Villain (shared with Mithoon)	Nominated	
2014	Zee Cine Awards	Best Music Director	Aashiqui 2 (shared with Mithoon, Jeet Gannguli)	Won	
