= Aashiqui 2 =

2013 Indian film by Mohit Suri

- Theatrical release poster
- Directed by: Mohit Suri
- Written by: Shagufta Rafique
- Produced by: Bhushan Kumar; Mukesh Bhatt; Krishan Kumar
- Starring: Aditya Roy Kapur; Shraddha Kapoor; Shaad Randhawa; Mahesh Thakur
- Cinematography: Vishnu Rao
- Edited by: Devendra A. Murdeshwar
- Music by: Songs: Jeet Gannguli; Mithoon; Ankit Tiwari; Score: Raju Singh
- Production companies: T-Series Films; Vishesh Films
- Distributed by: AA Films
- Release date: 26 April 2013
- Running time: 134 minutes
- Country: India
- Language: Hindi
- Box office: ₹109 crore

Aashiqui 2 (transl. Romance 2) is a 2013 Indian Hindi-language musical romantic drama film directed by Mohit Suri, and jointly produced by Bhushan Kumar and Mukesh Bhatt under the T-Series Films and Vishesh Films production banners. It is a spiritual successor to the 1990 musical film Aashiqui. The film stars Aditya Roy Kapur and Shraddha Kapoor, with Shaad Randhawa and Mahesh Thakur in supporting roles. The film centers on a turbulent romantic relationship between a failing singer, Rahul Jaykar, and his protege, aspiring singer Aarohi Keshav Shirke, which is affected by Rahul's issues with alcohol abuse and temperament.

It is an adaptation of both the original 1937 version and the 1976 remake of A Star is Born. (Note: The 1937 film is in the public domain and was based on the film What Price Hollywood? (1932), itself adapted from a story by Adela Rogers St. Johns, who loosely based her plot on the experiences of actress Colleen Moore and her husband, alcoholic producer John McCormick, and the life and death of director Tom Forman, who committed suicide following a nervous breakdown.) There were initially several concerns in the Indian media that it could not live up to the high standards and success of the original. Production of the film began in 2011, with the principal photography taking place in Cape Town, Goa and Mumbai on a budget of ₹15 crore (US$1.6 million).

Aashiqui 2 was released on 26 April 2013 in India, and became a commercial success at the box-office despite featuring newcomers, and was one of the highest-grossing Hindi films of 2013, earning over ₹100 crore (US$11 million) and within the first four weeks, ending both Kapur's and Kapoor's early years of struggle for recognition. Eventually, it became the highest grossing production for the Bhatt brothers and the Vishesh Films banner, until it was surpassed by Awarapan 2 in 2026. Since its release in 2013, it has gained cult status among audiences, with its soundtrack album topping the charts and proving to be a phenomenal success, marking a career breakthrough for Arijit Singh as a leading singer.

The film was remade in Telugu as Nee Jathaga Nenundali (2014).

== Plot ==
The film opens by showing a large crowd waiting for Rahul Jaykar, a successful singer and musician whose career is waning because of his alcohol addiction – to perform at a stage show in Goa. After nearly completing a song, he is unexpectedly interrupted by an artist, Aryan, who was losing his career due to Rahul's, during his performance. Rahul fights him, stops his performance, and drives to a local bar. He meets Aarohi Keshav Shirke, a bar singer who idolises Rahul. After noticing Aarohi looking at a photograph of Lata Mangeshkar in the bar, he assumes that she wants to become a singer. Impressed by her simplicity and voice, Rahul promises to transform her into a singing sensation and asks her to never perform again in bars. Due to his assurance, Aarohi leaves her job and returns to Mumbai with Rahul, who convinces record producer Saigal to meet her. When Aarohi calls Rahul, he is attacked and injured by some thugs, and is unable to receive her call. His friend and manager Vivek decides that news of the assault on Rahul should not be leaked to the media, and instead publicises a false story that Rahul has left the country to participate in stage shows. When Aarohi attempts to contact Rahul again, Vivek ignores the calls. After two months of futilely attempting to contact Rahul, a broken Aarohi is forced to sing in bars again because of her family problems.

Meanwhile, Rahul recovers from his injuries and again starts the search for Aarohi. He learns that Aarohi is working in a bar again and that Vivek had ignored her calls without informing him. Rahul apologizes to Aarohi and fires Vivek, and they meet with Saigal for the recording agreement. Rahul begins to train Aarohi, who signs a music contract to sing in films and becomes a successful playback singer. Her family and Rahul are happy, but when people begin to gossip that Rahul is using her as a servant, he relapses into alcohol addiction. Aarohi, who loves Rahul more than her career, comforts him and they end up making love. Despite Aarohi's mother Subhadra's disapproval, Aarohi moves in with Rahul and things go well until Rahul's addiction worsens, causing him to become aggressive and violent.

Aarohi attempts to rehabilitate Rahul, sacrificing her singing career in doing so. After Saigal reminds them about their dream of Aarohi becoming a successful singer, Rahul orders her to focus on her work. During Aarohi's stage show, Rahul meets Kunal Basu, a journalist, backstage, where Kunal accuses him of using Aarohi for pleasure and money. Furious, Rahul beats up Kunal and starts drinking. He ends up in jail, and Aarohi comes to bail him out. Rahul overhears Aarohi telling Saigal that she is going to leave her career for him and is ready to give up her celebrity status because Rahul is more important to her. Rahul understands that he has become a burden in her life, and that leaving her is his only option to save her. The next day, he assures her that he will change his lifestyle, but little does she know that he actually intends to commit suicide, which he does by jumping off a bridge. His death pains a number of people, including Saigal, who was otherwise insistent, just like Rahul, on Aarohi moving ahead in her career.

Distraught by Rahul's death, Aarohi decides to leave her career but Vivek persuades her to stay. He reminds her that Rahul wanted her to become a successful singer and killed himself as he did not want to be a burden on her and remain an obstacle in the path of her success. Aarohi agrees, and returns to singing. Later, she signs her name as "Aarohi Rahul Jaykar" in a fan's handbook as a tribute to Rahul and her unsung desire to marry him. As it starts raining, she watches the couple who took her autograph sharing a romantic moment under a jacket as she and Rahul had once done.

== Cast ==
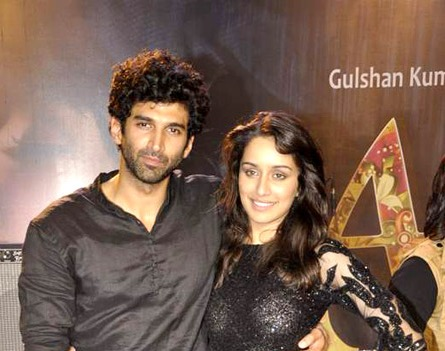
Aditya Roy Kapur and Shraddha Kapoor (from left)

- Aditya Roy Kapur as Rahul Jaykar
- Shraddha Kapoor as Aarohi Keshav Shirke / Aarohi Rahul Jaykar (voiceover by Mona Ghosh Shetty)
- Shaad Randhawa as Vivek, Rahul's friend
- Mahesh Thakur as Saigal
- Shubhangi Latkar as Subhadra Shirke, Aarohi's mother
- Milind Pathak as Keshav Shirke, Aarohi's father
- Mahesh Bhatt as Vikram Jaykar, Rahul's father (voiceover)
- Vineet Sharma as a man drinking in bar

== Production ==
=== Development ===
In September 2011, the Indian media reported that Mahesh Bhatt and Bhushan Kumar were keen to remake the 1990 musical blockbuster Aashiqui. Kumar approached Bhatt for a possible sequel, although it was Shagufta Rafique's melodramatic romantic script which persuaded him that the film had potential as a sequel and decided to proceed with the project. Given Aashiqui's status in Hindi cinematic history as one of the finest Indian musicals of all time, many expressed concerns towards the decision to remake the film, dubious that the producers could come up with a soundtrack on par with the quality of the 1990 film. Bhatt stated that they completely resisted the temptation to use the soundtrack of the earlier film, and promised that Aashiqui 2 would revive the era of melodious film music, as Aashiqui had done 22 years ago.

It was reported that Madhur Bhandarkar had been approached to direct the film, but later turned down the offer because of other working commitments. It was confirmed in November 2011 that Vishal Mahadkar, director of Blood Money, was to direct the picture, but the following month it was announced that Mohit Suri had replaced Mahadkar as director at the last minute. Bhatt confirmed the development, saying "Earlier we had finalised Vishal for the project. But now we have scrapped that idea and found a fresh one. We got Mohit to direct the film".

=== Casting ===
The film's producers launched a nationwide talent hunt to discover new faces for the film, initially refusing to employ established actors. However, the actors who came to audition were not promising enough for the roles, and the idea was scrapped. Mahesh Bhatt said, "It was a disastrous talent hunt. We discovered that people lacked the courage to audition. Those who are amateurs went for audition ...and people with certain talent were like why should we risk public rejection." When Suri saw some pictures of Aditya Roy Kapur and met him, he found Kapur perfect for the role and cast him to play the male lead.

In June 2012, Shraddha Kapoor was signed to play the female lead. Bhatt confirmed his choice citing her talent for the challenging part. When asked about replacing new actors with known ones, Suri said "People said I couldn't make a film with new actors and expect an audience to come in. But I was pretty sure I wanted Aditya and Shraddha to play my protagonists. My writer Shagufta Rafique and I saw them as the protagonists. See, Aditya and Shraddha may have had unsuccessful films before. But that never took away from their talent."

=== Filming ===
Principal photography for the film began in late 2012 with film's lead cast. The film was shot in Goa, Mumbai and Cape Town. During the filming in South Africa, Shraddha Kapoor needed medical attention after kneeling on broken glass fragments during the scene in which she had to kneel on the floor and talk to her co-star Aditya Roy Kapur. Aditya Roy Kapur also received burns to his hand during the filming of the scene in which they light some Chinese lanterns in Cape Town.

== Marketing ==
The first look was released on 22 March 2013, and was well received by critics and audiences. Unlike other films whose theatrical trailers are released first, the makers of the film chose to release the songs before the trailer. The first song, "Tum Hi Ho", was released on 16 March 2013 to unanimous critical reception from critics and became very popular among audiences. The song became an instant hit with approximately 2 million views on YouTube within 10 days of release, which helped in the marketing of the film. It trended on Twitter and YouTube on its launch.

The film's preview poster showing Aditya and Shraddha under a jacket in a rain-drenched street with the streetlight casting a glow was released along with music on 3 April 2013. At the music release event, Aditya and Shraddha recreated the scene from Aashiqui from under a jacket (much like the poster) on the stage. The theatrical trailer was released in mid-April 2013, two weeks before the film's release, and was well received by critics and audiences.

Unlike most Bollywood films which indulge in months of promotion before the release, Aashiqui 2 had less than three weeks for promotion before its release. A music concert where singers (who sang songs in the soundtrack album) performed their respective songs was organised to promote the film. The makers of the film launched the Aashiqui 2 jackets, as seen in the film's poster. Statues resembling the signature image of the couple hiding under the jacket were placed inside various theatres.

== Release ==
Due to the romantic theme of the film, it was originally planned for a Valentine's Day release on 14 February 2013, but this was postponed because of production delays. The film was released on 26 April 2013 in over 1100 screens across India. The film was not released in key markets such as UK, US, Canada, Australia and New Zealand.

== Reception ==
=== Box office ===
On its opening day, Aashiqui 2 collected about ₹52.5 million (US$560,000) and collected ₹179 million (US$1.9 million) during its first weekend. The film collected ₹347 million (US$3.7 million) in its first week. In the second week, despite new releases, it collected ₹174 million (US$1.9 million), which took its two-week box-office collections to ₹470 million (US$5.0 million). It remained steady on weekdays and collected ₹165 million (US$1.8 million) in its third week and total collections rose to ₹635 million (US$6.8 million). The film had the highest third week collections of 2013 to that date. The film's revenues remained consistent in its fourth weekend and took its total to ₹710 million (US$7.6 million). Box Office India called the film a success after its three-week box office run. As of 20 May, it was the second-highest grossing Hindi film of 2013 and the highest-grossing film produced by Vishesh Films. According to Box Office India, Aashiqui 2 is the best trending film at the box office since 3 Idiots as the fourth week's collections were nearly ₹75 million (US$800,000) nett, which was more than every film released in the last ten years apart from 3 Idiots. The fourth week collections were the third highest of all time. The film collected ₹57.5 million (US$610,000) nett approx in its fifth week. The film went on to gross approximately ₹780 million (US$8.3 million) in its sixth week at the domestic box-office.

Internationally, Aashiqui 2 collected around US$150,000 over the first weekend because its limited release meant it was only released in UAE and Pakistan. The film collected ₹1 billion (US$11 million) worldwide in its fourth week.

During its entire theatrical run, the film earned ₹1.09 billion (US$12 million).

=== Critical response ===
Critics praised the film's performances, chemistry between the lead pair, and the music. Taran Adarsh of Bollywood Hungama rated the film 4 out of 5 stars, stating that it "brings romance back on the Hindi screen – intense, pure, selfless and heart wrenching. A stirring account with brilliant moments, bravura performances, strong emotional quotient and addictive music, this one's an absolute must watch for the romantics." He praised the lead cast's performances, writing that "...Aditya Roy Kapur's depiction of the intense character is outstanding... [which] clearly demonstrates his potency as an artist of caliber and competence. Shraddha also gets to sink her challenging character and the attractive youngster is simply amazing, more so towards the demanding moments in the second hour. Furthermore, the chemistry between Aditya and Shraddha is incredible." Indiatimes gave the film a rating of 3.5 out of 5 and said, "Suri pitches the story with old-world romance, high-drama and well-crafted heart-breaking moments." Indo-Asian News Service rated the film 3.5 out of 5 and wrote, "Director Mohit Suri traverses the angst-soaked territory with a sincere and deep understanding of the dynamics that destroy love and trust between couples in the glamorous and competitive profession", and that, "Aashiqui 2 makes us grateful for the movement of the love story away from the standard Romeo & Juliet format into the dark destructive domain of A Star Is Born."

The film also received some mixed reactions from critics. Writing for Hindustan Times, Anupama Chopra rated the film 2.5 out of 5 and believed that the film did not fulfill its potential, but said, "It's an interesting scenario and Suri and his actors set it up well. Aditya gives Rahul's angst a certain charm. He is earnest and broken. And the real triumph here is Shraddha, whose porcelain face has a haunting vulnerability. She's very good as the woman in the throes of a grand passion who believes that love will show the way."

=== Accolades ===
Filmfare Awards

- Best Music Director : Ankit Tiwari, Mithoon and Jeet Ganguly
- Best Playback Singer (Male) : Arijit Singh ("Tum Hi Ho")
- Nominated, Best Actress : Shraddha Kapoor
- Nominated, Best Playback Singer (Female) : Shreya Ghoshal ("Sunn Raha Hai")

IIFA Awards

- Best Music Director : Mithoon, Ankit Tiwari, Jeet Ganguly
- Best Lyricist : Mithoon ("Tum Hi Ho")
- Best Male Playback : Arijit Singh ("Tum Hi Ho")
- Best Female Playback : Shreya Ghoshal ("Sunn Raha Hai")
- Nominated, Best Actress : Shraddha Kapoor
- Nominated, Best Lyricist : Sandeep Nath ("Sunn Raha Hai")
- Nominated, Best Male Playback : Ankit Tiwari ("Sunn Raha Hai")

Screen Awards

- Best Playback Singer (Male) : Arijit Singh ("Tum Hi Ho")
- Best Playback Singer (Female) : Shreya Ghoshal ("Sunn Raha Hai")
- Screen Award for Jodi No. 1 : Aditya Roy Kapur & Shraddha Kapoor
- Nominated, Best Music Director : Ankit Tiwari, Mithoon and Jeet Ganguly
- Nominated, Best Actress Female : Shraddha Kapoor
- Nominated, Most Popular Actor Male : Aditya Roy Kapur
- Nominated, Most Popular Actress Female : Shraddha Kapoor

Mirchi Music Awards

- Song of The Year : "Tum Hi Ho"
- Album of The Year : Mithoon, Jeet Gannguli, Ankit Tiwari, Sandeep Nath, Irshad Kamil, Sanjay Masoomm
- Male Vocalist of The Year : Arijit Singh ("Tum Hi Ho")
- Music Composer of The Year : Mithoon ("Tum Hi Ho")
- Upcoming Male Vocalist of The Year : Ankit Tiwari ("Sunn Raha Hai")
- Upcoming Music Composer of The Year : Ankit Tiwari ("Sunn Raha Hai")
- Listeners' Choice Song of the Year : "Sunn Raha Hai"
- Listeners' Choice Album of the Year : Mithoon, Jeet Gannguli, Ankit Tiwari, Sandeep Nath, Irshad Kamil, Sanjay Masoomm
