= Aditya Roy Kapur =

Indian actor (born 1985)

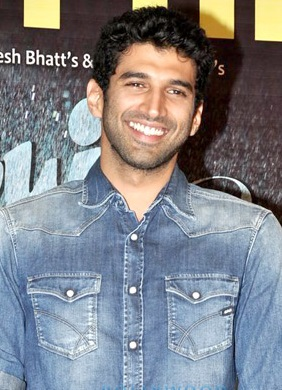
- Aditya Roy Kapur at the Aashiqui 2 success bash
- Born: 16 November 1985 (age 40); Bombay, Maharashtra, India
- Education: St. Xavier's College, Mumbai
- Occupation: Actor
- Years active: 2009–present
- Family: Roy Kapur family

Aditya Roy Kapur (born 16 November 1985) is an Indian actor who works in Hindi films. After working as a VJ, he made his acting debut with the musical drama London Dreams (2009). Kapur had his first commercial success with the romance Aashiqui 2 (2013). In the same year, the romantic comedy Yeh Jawaani Hai Deewani emerged as his highest-grossing release, and won him the IIFA Award for Best Supporting Actor in addition to a nomination for the Filmfare Award for Best Supporting Actor.

Following a career downturn, with critical and commercial failures such as Daawat-e-Ishq (2014), Fitoor (2016), Ok Jaanu (2017) and Kalank (2019), Kapur made a resurgence with the critically and commercially successful films Malang (2020) and Metro... In Dino. During the same period, he also gained critical success in the streaming projects Ludo (2020) and the thriller series The Night Manager (2023).

== Early life and family ==
Kapur was born in Bombay on 16 November 1985 to a Punjabi Hindu father, Kumud Roy Kapur, and a Jewish mother Salome Aaron. His paternal grandfather, Raghupat Roy Kapur, was a film producer in the early 1940s. Kapur is the youngest of the three siblings; his eldest brother, Siddharth Roy Kapur, was the chief executive officer of UTV Motion Pictures and is married to actress Vidya Balan. His second elder brother, Kunaal Roy Kapur, is also an actor.

His maternal grandparents, Sam and Ruby Aaron, were qualified dance teachers who introduced the Samba dance to India. He did his schooling from G.D. Somani Memorial School in Cuffe Parade, where both his siblings studied and his mother directed school plays.

Kapur enrolled in St. Xavier's in Class XI, but failed. He had to enroll in St. Andrew's College to avoid losing a year. Subsequently, he graduated from St. Xavier's College, affiliated to the University of Mumbai. During his school years, he wanted to be a cricketer but he quit cricket coaching after sixth standard.

== Career ==
=== Early work and acting debut (2009–2012) ===
Kapur was initially a VJ on the music channel Channel V India, where his comic timing and "unique style of hosting" was appreciated. He starred in a show titled Pakao and also hosted the popular show, India's Hottest with VJ Bruna Abdullah till 2008.

Kapur made his acting debut with a supporting role in the musical drama London Dreams (2009) starring Salman Khan, Ajay Devgn and Asin Thottumkal in lead roles. The film opened to mixed reviews from critics upon release, and emerged as a below-average grosser at the box-office. The series of supporting roles continued with his two releases in 2010–the Akshay Kumar-Aishwarya Rai-starrer science-fiction romantic comedy Action Replayy and the Hrithik Roshan-Rai-starrer drama Guzaarish. However, none of these films performed well at the box office but gained Kapur notice among the audience. For his performance in Guzaarish, Khaleej Times stated, "Kapur is natural and vivacious and in-sync with the film’s spirit of celebrating life."

=== Breakthrough and career fluctuations (2013–present) ===
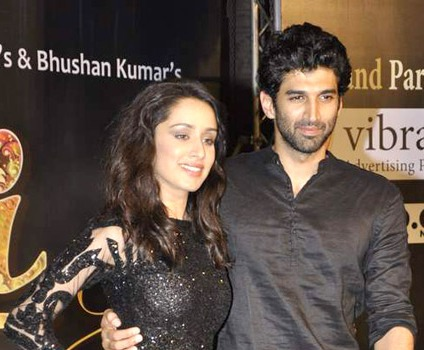
Kapur with Shraddha Kapoor promoting their film 'Aashiqui 2' in 2013.

Kapur achieved his breakthrough with the musical romance Aashiqui 2 (2013) co-starring Shraddha Kapoor. Premiering on 26 April 2013, Aashiqui 2 emerged as a commercial success at the box-office and was one of the highest-grossing Bollywood films of 2013, earning ₹1.45 billion (US$15 million) worldwide within the first four weeks. Taran Adarsh of Bollywood Hungama praised his performance, writing that "...Aditya Roy Kapur's depiction of the intense character is outstanding... [which] clearly demonstrates his potency as an artist of caliber and competence." Hindustan Times critic Anupama Chopra noted that Kapur "gives Rahul's angst a certain charm... He is earnest and broken."

The same year, Kapur played Avinash Arora in the romantic comedy Yeh Jawaani Hai Deewani, which not only became one of the highest grossing Indian films but also the highest grossing film of his career. Praising him, Rajeev Masand of CNN-IBN stated, "Aditya Roy Kapur is entirely likeable as the goofy Avi." While Rachit Gupta of Filmfare opined, "Aditya seems to be picking up where he left off in Aashiqui 2 and it works for him."

In 2014, he played Tariq Haider in the romantic comedy Daawat-e-Ishq alongside Parineeti Chopra. The film released to average reviews by critics, and was financially unsuccessful. Sarita A. Tanwar of Daily News and Analysis stated, "Aditya play his part well and manages to hold his own but the film belongs to the leading lady." In 2016, Kapur starred as Noor Nizami in the romantic drama film Fitoor alongside Tabu and Katrina Kaif based on Charles Dickens' 1861 novel Great Expectations. Sweta Kaushal of Hindustan Times found Tabu and Aditya as "undoubtedly the best bets" in Fitoor. Kapur also made cameo appearances in films Dear Zindagi and Welcome To New York.

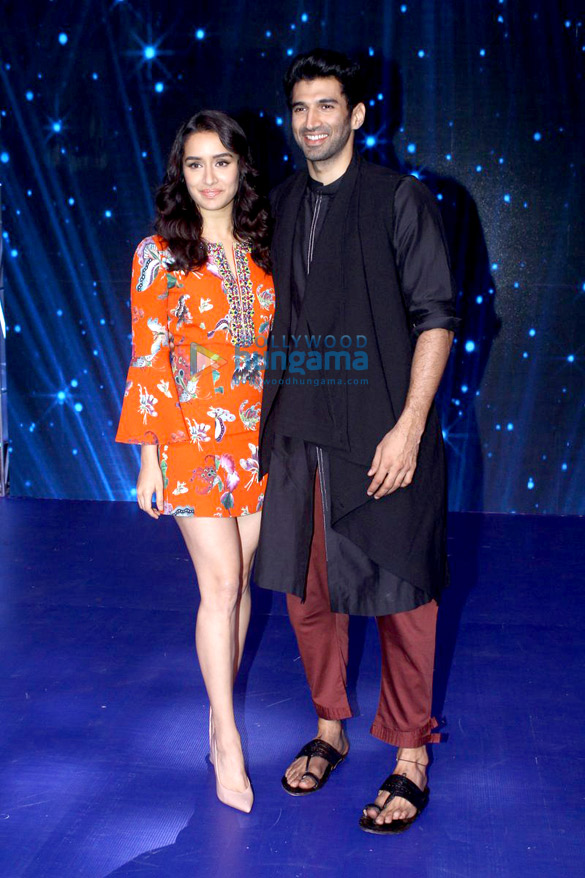
Aditya Roy Kapur & Shraddha Kapoor promote ‘Ok Jaanu’ on the sets of Indian Idol

In 2017, Kapur starred as Aditya Gunjal in the romantic drama film Ok Jaanu alongside Shraddha Kapoor which received mixed reviews from critics, Bollywood Hungama wrote, "Aditya Roy Kapur plays his part well, though he struggles with the emotional scenes. His portrayal of an urban career oriented boy is very believable." In 2019, he starred as Dev Chaudhry in the romantic drama film Kalank alongside Alia Bhatt, Varun Dhawan and Sonakshi Sinha. The film received mixed reviews upon release, and was unsuccessful at the box office. Shomini Sen of WION wrote, "Aditya, is pitch perfect as the righteous, lonesome Dev who is stuck between his two wives."

Kapur had three releases in 2020. He first starred as Adavit Thakur in the romantic action thriller Malang alongside Disha Patani. Kapur's performance got positive reviews from critics. Harshada Rege of The Times of India wrote, "Aditya impresses in the role of a guy whose life goes through a major upheaval. He shows restraint and finesses in his performance. The actor's physical transformation adds weight to all the kicks and punches he pulls in the film." Bollywood Hungama called his performance as "very convincing as a fearless man with a vengeance who can take on dozens of goons.

He then starred as Vishal Agnihotri in the road film Sadak 2 alongside Sanjay Dutt and Alia Bhatt, which released on the streaming platform Disney+ Hotstar. The film was universally panned by critics, with criticism for its performance, script, dialogues and use of clichés. Anupama Chopra of Film Companion wrote, "The storytelling, performances dialogue, cinematography, songs, background music – all seem to belong to the 90's". He starred in the black comedy crime film Ludo as Aakash Chauhan alongside Sanya Malhotra which released on Netflix as his last film of the year. Tanul Thakur of The Wire noted, "Kapur is easily the best of the lot, assured, funny, relaxed, lending Ludo the breeziness it badly needs."

Kapur and Sanjana Sanghi starred in the action thriller film Rashtra Kavach Om. It released theatrically in 2022 with received negative response from critics towards the storyline eventually became Box office bomb. Nairita Mukherjee of India Today wrote "Aditya Roy Kapur's glistening biceps, though impressive, may not be strong enough to hold the weight of this strictly average actioner".

In 2023, Kapur starred in The Night Manager, a remake of the British television series of the same name, playing the part originally played by Tom Hiddleston. Saibal Chatterjee of NDTV opined, "Kapur's performance isn't a patch on Hiddleston's. But the adaptation allows him to be himself. That works to his advantage." In April 2023 he starred in Gumraah alongside Mrunal Thakur, which was the Hindi remake of the 2019 Tamil film Thadam. Zinia Bandyopadhyay of India Today noted, "Aditya Roy Kapur is earnest in playing both the characters and tries to make you feel how they are starkly different from each other with his performance." The film underperformed commercially, becoming a box-office disaster.

Kapur played the lead in Anurag Basu's film Metro... In Dino in 2025 alongside Sara Ali Khan.

== Other work and media image ==
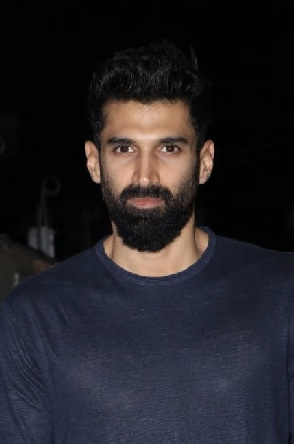
Kapur in 2021

In addition to acting, Kapur is a football enthusiast and supports charities and organisations. He has often participated in football matches for charity. Kapur has also been involved with the "Pillars Of Humanity" initiative by the Ankibai Ghamandiram Gowani Trust, and has also contributed to the environment, with planting 150 trees with Pragya Kapoor. Kapur performed in various cities in the United States for the "Dream Team" tour in August 2016, alongside Karan Johar, Varun Dhawan, Sidharth Malhotra, Parineeti Chopra, Katrina Kaif, Alia Bhatt and Badshah.

Kapur is frequently featured in the Times 50 Most Desirable Men list. He was ranked 28th in 2018, 11th in 2019 and 3rd in 2020 Kapur is a celebrity endorser for brands and products, including Nautica, Diesel, Oppo and Slice among others. In 2019, Kapur launched his own fashion label named Single, in partnership with Universal Sportsbiz. Kapur was included in Femina India's list of "Beautiful Indians 2022". He won the Standout Performer Of The Year - Male, at the ceremony for winning hearts on-screen and making the world a better place off-screen. GQ India placed Kapur in their list of "Best Dressed Indians" of 2021.

== Filmography ==
=== Films ===
Key
†	Denotes films that have not yet been released

Year	Title	Role	Notes	Ref
2009	London Dreams	Wasim Afroz Khan		
2010	Action Replayy	Bunty Saigal Chopra		
2010	Guzaarish	Omar Siddiqui		
2013	Aashiqui 2	Rahul Jaykar		
2013	Yeh Jawaani Hai Deewani	Avinash "Avi" Arora		
2014	Daawat-e-Ishq	Tariq "Taru" Haidar		
2016	Fitoor	Noor Nizami		
2016	Dear Zindagi	Daljeet Sharma	Cameo appearance	
2017	Ok Jaanu	Aditya "Adi" Gunjal		
2018	Welcome To New York	Himself	Cameo appearance	
2019	Kalank	Dev Chaudhary		
2020	Malang	Advait Thakur		
2020	Sadak 2	Vishal Agnihotri / Munna Chavan		
2020	Ludo	Aakash Chauhan		
2022	Rashtra Kavach Om	Om Singh Rathore / Rishi Singh Rathore		
2023	Gumraah	Arjun Sehgal / Sooraj Rana / Ronnie		
2025	Metro... In Dino	Parth Nakul Sahadev		

=== Television ===
Year	Title	Role	Notes	Ref
2018	Side Hero	Himself	Episode: "Bodyguard"	
2023	The Night Manager	Shantanu "Shaan" Sengupta / Joaquim Sequeira / Abhimanyu Mathur		
2026	Rakt Brahmand: The Bloody Kingdom †	Rahul / Prince Vithal	Filming	

== Awards and nominations ==
Year	Award	Category	Work	Result	Ref.
2011	Stardust Awards	Superstar of Tomorrow – Male	Action Replayy & Guzaarish	Nominated	
2011	Zee Cine Awards	Best Male Debut	Action Replayy & Guzaarish	Nominated	
2013	BIG Star Entertainment Awards	Best Actor in a Romantic Role	Aashiqui 2	Won	
2013	BIG Star Entertainment Awards	Most Romantic Jodi (With Shraddha Kapoor)	Aashiqui 2	Won	
2014	Screen Awards	Best Actor (Popular Choice)	Aashiqui 2	Nominated	
2014	Screen Awards	Jodi No. 1 (With Shraddha Kapoor)	Aashiqui 2	Won	
2014	Producers Guild Film Awards	Jodi of the Year (With Shraddha Kapoor)	Aashiqui 2	Won	
2014	Zee Cine Awards	Best Actor – Male	Aashiqui 2	Nominated	
2014	Filmfare Awards	Best Supporting Actor	Yeh Jawaani Hai Deewani	Nominated	
2014	Producers Guild Film Awards	Best Actor in a Supporting Role	Yeh Jawaani Hai Deewani	Nominated	
2014	IIFA Awards	Best Supporting Actor	Yeh Jawaani Hai Deewani	Won	
2014	Zee Cine Awards	Best Actor in a Supporting Role – Male	Yeh Jawaani Hai Deewani	Nominated	
2015	Stardust Awards	Best Actor in a Comedy or Romance	Daawat-e-Ishq	Nominated	
2023	Bollywood Hungama Style Icons	Most Stylish Actor People's Choice – Male	—N/a	Won	
2023	2023 Filmfare OTT Awards	Best Actor in Drama Series	The Night Manager	Nominated	

== See also ==
- List of Indian film actors
