= List of songs recorded by Ankit Tiwari =

Ankit Tiwari Songs

Ankit Tiwari discography
- Hindi films: 55
- Hindi non-films: 12
- Telugu songs: 3
- Kannada Songs: 4
- Urdu & Bengal: 2
- As music director: 60
- Total: 136

Indian singer and music director Ankit Tiwari started his singing career in 2011 with the release of the film Saheb, Biwi Aur Gangster, where he composed and rendered the song "Saheb Bada Hatila". Though the song did not get much recognition in the musical platforms, his next release "Sunn Raha Hai" from Aashiqui 2 (2013) has attained general acclaim from music critics. Tiwari received his first nomination of Filmfare Award for Best Male Playback Singer for the film. He also won Filmfare Award for Best Music Director along with Mithoon & Jeet Gannguli for the same film. He received nomination from IIFA and Star Guild Awards and won the Mirchi's "Upcoming Male Vocalist of the Year" award for the song. It also fetched him several other awards for Best Music Director category. During the year he also did playback for a song titled "Aag Ka Dariya" from Issaq.

In 2014, Tiwari had eleven songs released and collaborated with different music directors; Shamir Tandon for Dee Saturday Night, Ismail Darbar for Kaanchi..., Ram Sampath for Purani Jeans and Himesh Reshammiya for two of his films, The Xposé and Action Jackson. He also sang a duet with Shreya Ghoshal–who had earlier worked with him in the female version of "Sunn Raha Hai"–for the song "Tequila Wakila" in Samrat & Co.. The year marks the first time, Tiwari dubbed for Aamir Khan, in the song "Dil Darbadar" from PK. He also composed a song for Singham Returns. Out of all the releases during the year, the most successful song happened to be "Galliyan" from Ek Villain, for which he received Filmfare Award for Best Male Playback Singer and received a nomination of Filmfare Award for Best Music Director along with Mithoon & Soch. He also won Stardust Awards, BIG Star Entertainment Awards and Star Guild Awards. In 2015, he composed or sang for Alone, Khamoshiyan, Roy, Badmashiyaan, Mr. X, All Is Well (film), Bhaag Johnny, Kuch Kuch Locha Hai, Ishqedarriyaan, Tanu Weds Manu Returns. He won again Filmfare Award for Best Music Director for Roy along with Amaal Mallik & Meet Bros. He also received a nomination of Filmfare Award for Best Male Playback Singer for the same film. In 2016, Tiwari sang or composed for Wazir, Airlift, Sanam Teri Kasam, Sanam Re, Baaghi, Tum Bin II, Junooniyat, Rustom, Rocky Handsome, Ishq Junoon, Beiimaan Love. He received another nomination of Filmfare Award for Best Music Director along with Amaal Mallik, Meet Bros & Manj Musik for Baaghi. In 2017, he only composed a song for Baadshaho. In 2018, he composed & sang a song with Palak Muchhal for Aiyaary. He also sang a song for Baaghi 2 with shruti pathak.

== Hindi film songs ==
Key
•	Indicates songs composed solely by Tiwari

=== 2010 ===
Film	Song	Composer(s)	Writer(s)	Co-singer(s)	Ref.
Do Dooni Char	"Do Dooni Char"	Ankit Tiwari, Meet Bros Anjjan		Shankar Mahadevan, Vishal Dadlani	
Do Dooni Char	"Maange Ki Ghodi"	Ankit Tiwari, Meet Bros Anjjan		Rakesh Pandit, Krishna	
Do Dooni Char	"Baaja Bajya"	Ankit Tiwari, Meet Bros Anjjan		Sunidhi Chauhan, Meet Bros Anjjan	
Do Dooni Char	"Ek Haath De"	Ankit Tiwari, Meet Bros Anjjan		Meet Bros Anjjan	

=== 2011 ===
Film	Song	Composer(s)	Writer(s)	Co-singer(s)	Ref.
Saheb, Biwi Aur Gangster	"Saheb Bada Hatila"	Ankit tiwari	Sandeep Nath	Vipin Aneja	

=== 2013 ===
Film	Song	Composer(s)	Writer(s)	Co-singer(s)	Ref.
Aashiqui 2	"Sunn Raha Hai" (Male Version)	Ankit Tiwari	Sandeep Nath		
Aashiqui 2	"Sun Raha Hai (Female)	Ankit Tiwari	Sandeep Nath	Shreya Ghoshal	
Issaq	"Aag Ka Dariya"	Sachin Gupta	Anil Pandey		

=== 2014 ===
Film	Song	Composer(s)	Writer(s)	Co-singer(s)	Ref.
Dee Saturday Night	"Falsafa Mera Falsafa"	Ankit Tiwari	Sandeep Nath	Debolina Bose	
Dee Saturday Night	"Jhatak Ke Nacho"	Shamir Tandon	Sandeep Nath	Akriti Kakar, Suzanne D'Mello, Shivi Singh	
Kaanchi...	"Kaisa Hai Dard Mera"	Ismail Darbar	Irshad Kamil		
Samrat & Co.	"Tequila Wakila"	Ankit Tiwari	Sanjay Masoom	Shreya Ghoshal	
Samrat & Co.	"Sawaloon Mein"	Ankit Tiwari	Sandeep Nath	Shreya Ghoshal	
Purani Jeans	"Yeh Dosti"	Ram Sampath	Munna Dhiman		
The Xposé	"Sheeshe Ka Samundar"	Himesh Reshammiya	Sameer		
The Xposé	"Sheeshe Ka Samundar" (Remix Version)	Himesh Reshammiya	Sameer		
Ek Villain	"Galliyan"	Ankit Tiwari	Manoj Muntashir		
Ek Villain	"Galliyan" (Unplugged Version)	Ankit Tiwari	Manoj Muntashir	Shraddha Kapoor	
Singham Returns	"Kuch Toh Hua Hai"	Ankit Tiwari	Sandeep Nath, Abhendra Kumar Upadhyay	Tulsi Kumar	
Action Jackson	"Punjabi Mast"	Himesh Reshammiya	Sameer	Himesh Reshammiya, Neeti Mohan, Arya Acharya, Alam Gir Khan, Vineet Singh	
Action Jackson	"Punjabi Mast" (Remix Version)	Himesh Reshammiya	Sameer	Himesh Reshammiya, Neeti Mohan, Arya Acharya, Alam Gir Khan, Vineet Singh	
Action Jackson	"Dhoom Dhaam"	Himesh Reshammiya	Sameer	Palak Muchhal	
PK	"Dil Darbadar"	Ankit Tiwari	Manoj Muntashir		

=== 2015 ===
Film	Song	Composer(s)	Writer(s)	Co-singer(s)	Ref.
Alone	"Katra Katra"	Ankit Tiwari	Abhay Upadhyay	Prakriti Kakar	
Khamoshiyan	"Bheegh Loon"	Ankit Tiwari	Abhay Upadhyay	Prakriti Kakar	
Khamoshiyan	"Bheegh Loon (Remix)	Ankit Tiwari	Abhay Upadhyay	Prakriti Kakar	
Khamoshiyan	"Bheegh Loon" (Male Version)	Ankit Tiwari	Abhay Upadhyay		
Roy	"Tu Hai Ki Nahin"	Ankit Tiwari	Abhay Upadhyay		
Roy	"Tu Hai Ki Nahin (Unplugged)"	Ankit Tiwari	Abhay Upadhyay	Tulsi Kumar	
Roy	"Boond Boond"	Ankit Tiwari	Abhay Upadhyay		
Roy	"Yaara Re"	Ankit Tiwari	Sandeep Nath	KK	
Badmashiyaan	"Shaitaaniyan"	Bobby–Imran	Shabbir Ahmed		
Mr. X	"Tu Jo Hai"	Ankit Tiwari	Mohnish Raza		
Mr. X	"Shukraana"	Ankit Tiwari	Mohnish Raza		
Mr. X	"Aalif Se"	Ankit Tiwari	Mohnish Raza	Neeti Mohan	
Ishqedarriyaan	"Ishqedarriyaan" (Title Track)	Jeet Gannguli	Kausar Munir		
Tanu Weds Manu Returns	"Mat Ja Re"	Krsna Solo	Raj Shekhar		
All Is Well	"Tu Milade"	Himesh Reshammiya	Mayur Puri		
Bhaag Johnny	"Iss Qadar Pyar Hai"	Arko Pravo Mukherjee	Faaiz Anwar		
Yaara Silly Silly	"Sathia (Solo)"	Ankit Tiwari	Sandeep Nath		
Yaara Silly Silly	"Sathia (Duet)	Ankit Tiwari	Sandeep Nath	Mehak Suri	
Yaara Silly Silly	"Sathia (Unplugged)	Ankit Tiwari	Sandeep Nath	Mehak Suri	
Yaara Silly Silly	"Behki"	Ankit Tiwari	Sandeep Nath	Shadaab Faridi, Mehak Suri	
Yaara Silly Silly	"Yun Hai"	Ankit Tiwari	Sandeep Nath	Neeti Mohan	
Yaara Silly Silly	"Tuk Tuk"	Ankit Tiwari	Sandeep Nath	Nandini Srikar	

=== 2016 ===
Film	Song	Composer(s)	Writer(s)	Co-singer(s)	Ref.
Wazir	"Tu Mere Paas"	Ankit Tiwari	Manoj Muntashir		
Airlift	"Dil Cheez Tujhe Dedi"	Ankit Tiwari	Kumaar	Arijit Singh	
Sanam Teri Kasam	"Sanam Teri Kasam" (Title Track)	Himesh Reshammiya	Sameer	Palak Muchhal	
Sanam Re	"Tere Liye"	Mithoon	Mithoon	Mithoon	
Ishq Junoon	"Tu Hi Mera Rab Hai"	Ankit Tiwari	Sanjeev Chaturvedi	Sukriti Kakkar	
Rocky Handsome	"Alfazon Ki Tarah"	Ankit Tiwari	Abhnendra Kumar Upadhyay		
Rocky Handsome	"Alfazon Ki Tarah" (Unplugged)	Ankit Tiwari	Abhnendra Kumar Upadhyay	Shreya Ghoshal, John Abraham	
Baaghi	"Agar Tu Hota"	Ankit Tiwari	Abhnendra Kumar Upadhyay		
Junooniyat	"Ishqe Di Lat Tadpave"	Ankit Tiwari	Manoj Muntashir	Tulsi Kumar	
Rustom	"Tay Hain"	Ankit Tiwari	Manoj Muntashir		
Rustom	"Jab Tum Hote Ho"	Ankit Tiwari	Manoj Muntashir	Shreya Ghoshal	
Beiimaan Love	"Pyaar De"	Ankit Tiwari	Abhnendra Kumar Upadhyay		
Tum Bin II	"Teri Fariyaad"	Ankit Tiwari	Shakeel Azmi, Faaiz Anwar	Jagjit Singh, Rekha Bhardwaj	
Tum Bin II	"Teri Fariyaad (Extended Version)"	Ankit Tiwari	Shakeel Azmi, Faaiz Anwar	Jagjit Singh, Rekha Bhardwaj	
Tum Bin II	"Ishq Mubarak"	Ankit Tiwari	Manoj Muntashir	Arijit Singh	
Tum Bin II	"Ishq Mubarak (Redux)"	Ankit Tiwari	Manoj Muntashir	Arijit Singh, Zack Knight	
Tum Bin II	"Dekh Lena"	Ankit Tiwari	Manoj Muntashir	Arijit Singh, Tulsi Kumar	
Tum Bin II	"Dekh Lena (Unplugged)"	Ankit Tiwari	Manoj Muntashir	Tulsi Kumar	
Tum Bin II	"Tum Bin" (Title Track)	Ankit Tiwari	Manoj Muntashir		
Tum Bin II	"Dil Nawaziyaan"	Ankit Tiwari	Manoj Muntashir	Arko Pravo Mukherjee, Payal Dev	
Tum Bin II	"Masta"	Ankit Tiwari	Manoj Muntashir	Vishal Dadlani, Neeti Mohan	
Tum Bin II	"Jager Bomb"	Ankit Tiwari	Manoj Muntashir	Dwayne Bravo, Harshi Mad	

=== 2017 ===
Film	Song	Composer(s)	Writer(s)	Co-singer(s)	Ref.
Laali Ki Shaadi Mein Laaddoo Deewana	"Rishta"	Arko Pravo Mukherjee	Ghulam Mohd Khabar	Arko Pravo Mukherjee	
Baadshaho	"Piya More"	Ankit Tiwari	Manoj Muntashir	Mika Singh, Neeti Mohan	

=== 2018 ===
Film	Song	Composer(s)	Writer(s)	Co-singer(s)	Ref.
Aiyaary	''Yaad Hai''	Ankit Tiwari	Manoj Muntashir	Palak Muchhal	
Baaghi 2	''Soniye Dil Nayi''	Gourov-Roshin	Kumaar	Shruti Pathak	
FryDay	''Chotey Bade''	Ankit Tiwari	Anurag Bhomia	Mika Singh	
22 Days	''Mehfooz''	Parivesh singh	Sagar Lahauri		
Kaashi in Search of Ganga	''Wo Rishta''	Ankit Tiwari	Abhyendra Kumar Upadhyay	Deepali Sathe	
Kaashi in Search of Ganga	"Wo Rishta" (Reprise)	Ankit Tiwari	Abhyendra Kumar Upadhyay	Deepali Sathe	
Kaashi in Search of Ganga	"Betahasha"	Ankit Tiwari	Abhyendra Kumar Upadhyay	Sonu Nigam, Palak Mucchal	

=== 2019 ===
Key
†	Denotes songs from unreleased/upcoming films

Film	Song	Composer(s)	Writer(s)	Co-singer(s)	Ref.
Amavas	''Bheege Bheege''	Ankit Tiwari	Anurag Bhomia	Sunidhi Chauhan	
Prassthanam	''Dil Dariyan''	Ankit Tiwari	Anurag Bhomia	Deepali Sathe	
RAW - Romeo Akbar Walter	''Maa''	Ankit Tiwari	Prince Dubey	Solo	
Batla House	''Rula Diya''	Ankit Tiwari	Prince Dubey	Dhvani Bhanushali	
Pranaam	''Zindagi''	Vishal Mishra	Manoj Muntashir	Solo	
Commando 3	''Main Wo Raat Hoon''	Mannan Shaah	Abhendra Kumar Upadhyay	Solo	
Luv U Turn	''Aadat Ban Gaye Ho''	Puneet Dixit	Abhendra Kumar Upadhyay	Solo	

=== 2020 ===
Film	Song	Composer(s)	Writer(s)	Co-singer(s)
Malang	"Phir Na Mile"	Ankit Tiwari	Prince Dubey	
Sadak 2	"Tum Se Hi"	Ankit Tiwari	Shabbir Ahmed	Leena Bose
Sadak 2	"Tum Se Hi" (Reprise)	Ankit Tiwari	Shabbir Ahmed	Alia Bhatt
Yaara	"Bhedi"	Ankit Tiwari	Manoj Muntashir	Aishwarya Majumder

=== 2021 ===
Film	Song	Composer(s)	Writer(s)	Co-singer(s)	Ref.
Big Bull	"Ishq Namazaa"	Gourov Dasgupta	Kunwar Juneja	Solo	
Shiddat	"Hum Dum"	Gourov Dasgupta	Kunwar Juneja	Solo	

=== 2022 ===
Film	Song	Composer(s)	Writer(s)	Co-singer(s)
Badhaai Do	"Bandi Tot"	Ankit Tiwari	Anurag Bhomia	Nikhita Gandhi
Judaa Hoke Bhi	"Aye Mere Dil Bata"	Harish Sagane	Shweta Bothra	
Ek Villain Returns	"Galiyaan Returns"	Ankit Tiwari	Manoj Muntashir	
Ek Villain Returns	"Galliyan" (Female)	Ankit Tiwari	Manoj Muntashir	Tara Sutaria
Ek Villain Returns	"Shaamat"	Ankit Tiwari	Prince Dubey	Tara Sutaria
Ek Villain Returns	"Shaamat" (Ankit Version)	Ankit Tiwari	Prince Dubey	
Prem Geet 3	"Tum Pyaar Ho"	Aslam Keyi	Kumaar	Palak Muchhal
Atithi Bhooto Bhava	"Iss Dil Mein"	Prasad S	Kunaal Vermaa, Priyanka R Bala	

== Non-film Hindi and Non-Hindi songs ==
Year	Film	Language	Song	Composer(s)	Writer(s)	Co-singer(s)	Note
2014	Dil Rangeela	Kannada	"Nillu Nillu"	Arjun Janya	Jayanth Kaikini		
2014	Khushi Khushiyagi	Kannada	"Athiyayithu"	Anoop Rubens	Jayanth Kaikini	Shreya Ghoshal	
2014	Jai Lalitha	Kannada	"Dilge Dilge"	Sridhar V Sambhram	Lokesh Krishna	Supriya Lohith	
2014	Nee Jathaga Nenundali	Telugu	"Vintunnava Nestham" (Male Version)	Ankit Tiwari	Chandrabose		Telugu remake of "Sunn Raha Hai" from Aashiqui 2
2014	Oka Laila Kosam	Telugu	"Teluse Nuvvu Ravani"	Anoop Rubens	Anantha Sreeram		
2015	Bin Roye	Urdu	"O Yara"	Waqar Ali	Sabir Zafar		
2016	Badtameez	Hindi	Badtameez	Ankit Tiwari	Manoj Muntashir		
2017	Keshar	Nepali	"Keshar"	Ankit Tiwari			
2017	Nabab	Bengali	"Jabo Niye"	Savvy Gupta	Prasen	Madhura Bhattacharya	
2017	Tum Hardafa Ho	Hindi	Tum Hardafa Ho	Ankit Tiwari	Abhendra Kumar Upadhyay		
2017	Aevuj rahese	Hindi	Anjani Koi Rah Par	Ankit Tiwari	Deep Bhatt		
2017	Tere Jaane se	Hindi	Tere Jaane se	Ankit Tiwari	Anurag Bhomia		
2018	Tere Ishq Ki Baarish Mein	Hindi	Tere Ishq Ki Baarish Mein	Ankit Tiwari	Laado Suwalka	Shivangi Bhayana	
2019	Mehbooba	Hindi	Mehbooba	Ankit Tiwari	Anurag Bhomia		
2019	Lover	Telugu	Anthe Kada Mari	Ankit Tiwari	Sirivennela Sitaramasastry	Jonita Gandhi	
2019	Lover	Telugu	Yevaipuga Naa Choopu Saagali (Sad Song)	Ankit Tiwari	Srimani		
2019	Bey pinjara	Hindi	Bey Pinjara	Ankit Tiwari	Anurag Bhomia		
2019	Naina	Hindi	Naina	Ankit Tiwari	Monish Raza & Sahas Pareek		
2019	Jhooth Bolna Paap Hai	Hindi	Jhooth Bolna Paap Hai	Ankit Tiwari & Meet Bros	Sahas Pareek	Meet Bros	
2019	Tere Do Naina		Tere Do Naina	Gourav & Roshin	Danish Sabri		
	Dard-E-Dill	Hindi	Amazon Prime	Arko	Laxmikant- Pyarelal	Priyanka Negi	
	Baashinda	Hindi	Baashinda	Arko	Arko	Arko	
2020	Single	Hindi	Taake Naina	Abhishek - Amol	Abhishek Talented	Jyotica Tangri	
	Taarifein	Hindi	Taarifein	Sanjeev-Ajay	Sanjeev Chaturvedi		
2021	H34 Pallavi Talkies	Kannada	Bareve Bareve Olava Kavana	B. Ajaneesh Loknath	Srinivas Chikkanna(SeeNi)		
2021	Non-album single	Hindi	Hum Hindustani	Dilshaad Shabbir Shaikh	Kashish Kumar	Various	
2021	Non-album single	Hindi	Love To You	Ankit Tiwari	Rika, Arko Pravo Mukherjee	Rika	
