= Ek Villain (soundtrack) =

Soundtrack album by Mithoon, Ankit Tiwari, Adnan Dhool and Rabbi Ahmed
- Released: 28 May 2014
- Recorded: 2013
- Genre: Feature film soundtrack
- Length: 31:20
- Language: Hindi
- Label: T-Series
- Producer: Ekta Kapoor
External audio
- Audio Jukebox on YouTube

Mithoon chronology
| Samrat & Co (2014) | Ek Villain (2014) | Creature 3D (2014) |

Ankit Tiwari chronology
| Samrat & Co (2014) | Ek Villain (2014) | Singham Returns (2014) |

Adnan Dhool and Rabbi Ahmed chronology
| Ek Villain (2014) | Dekh Magar Pyaar Say (2015) |

Ek Villain is the soundtrack to the 2014 film of the same name directed by Mohit Suri starring Riteish Deshmukh, Sidharth Malhotra and Shraddha Kapoor. Mithoon composed and wrote three songs for the film, while Ankit Tiwari contributed music for one song "Galliyan" with lyrics by Manoj Muntashir which also features an unplugged version. The track "Awari" is composed and penned by Adnan Dhool and Rabbi Ahmed of the Pakistani pop and Sufi band Soch. The soundtrack which consisted six songs, released on 28 May 2014 under the T-Series label, to positive reviews.

== Release ==
The soundtrack was preceded with two singles: "Galliyan" and "Banjaara" released on 9 and 14 May 2014. The remainder of the songs were released along with the album on 28 May 2014 through digital music platforms. The music video for "Awari" featuring Prachi Desai in an item number released on 11 June 2014.

== Reception ==
In his four-star review for Koimoi, Mohar Basu said "the album as a whole has a bunch of brilliant tracks which must not be missed [...] a few songs do have hiccups but Ek Villain‘s music has something canorous about it. Don't miss this one, it will emerge as one of the best albums this year." Devesh Sharma of Filmfare wrote "The OST of Ek Villain is another winner for Mohit Suri who has a knack for bringing out the best in his music directors. Go for it if you like soulful romantic tracks with loads of fusion thrown in." Joginder Tuteja rated four-stars for the soundtrack in his review for Rediff.com adding that "The music of Ek Villain meets the high expectations that one had from it."

Sankhayan Ghosh of The Indian Express wrote "Although it does have a similar melancholic vibe it's never a problem. Suri manages to pull off a balanced, melodious album for his Aashiqui 2 follow up with his assemblage of composers." Music Aloud gave 7.5 out of 10 saying it as "Another soundtrack high on the déjà vu quotient with pretty much the same people involved, but Ankit Tiwari emerges the better one this time." Kasmin Fernandes of The Times of India called it as "A soundtrack that proves the worth of harmony, melody and emotions in today's films." Karthik Srinivasan of Miliblog ranked "Galliyan" as his pick of the album, stating "Ankit Tiwari rules over this typical Mohit Suri soundtrack". In a mixed review for Bollywood Hungama, Rajiv Vijayakar wrote "The music attempts to tread Aashiqui 2's terrain. However, while most of the songs are melodious, a comparable level of lyrical depth is missing- and therein lies the vital difference."

"Galliyan" topped the list of "Bollywood music report Jan–Sept 2014" presented by The Times of India, and was further included in "The Top 10 Most Popular Songs of 2014" which was announced in the report of "Hungama.com Chart-toppers 2014". The song was placed in the fourth position of the "Top 10 songs of 2014" published by The Indian Express.

== Track listing ==
| No. | Title | Lyrics | Music | Singer(s) | Length |
|---|---|---|---|---|---|
| 1. | "Galliyan" | Manoj Muntashir | Ankit Tiwari | Ankit Tiwari | 5:41 |
| 2. | "Banjaara" | Mithoon | Mithoon | Mithoon, Mohd. Irfan | 5:36 |
| 3. | "Zaroorat" | Mithoon | Mithoon | Mithoon, Mustafa Zahid | 6:09 |
| 4. | "Awari" | Adnan Dhool, Rabbi Ahmed | Adnan Dhool, Rabbi Ahmed | Adnan Dhool, Momina Mustehsan | 5:20 |
| 5. | "Hamdard" | Mithoon | Mithoon | Arijit Singh | 4:20 |
| 6. | "Galliyan" (Unplugged) | Manoj Muntashir | Ankit Tiwari | Shraddha Kapoor, Ankit Tiwari | 4:14 |
| Total length: | | | | | 31:20 |

== Accolades ==
| Award | Date of ceremony (Note: Date is linked to the article about the awards held that year, wherever possible.) | Category | Recipients | Result | Ref. |
|---|---|---|---|---|---|
| BIG Star Entertainment Awards | 18 December 2014 | Most Entertaining Song | "Galliyan" | Nominated | |
| BIG Star Entertainment Awards | 18 December 2014 | Most Entertaining Singer | Ankit Tiwari – "Galliyan" | Won | |
| BIG Star Entertainment Awards | 18 December 2014 | Most Entertaining Music | Ankit Tiwari, Mithoon, Rabbi Ahmed and Adnan Dhool | Nominated | |
| Filmfare Awards | 31 January 2015 | Best Music Director | Ankit Tiwari, Mithoon, Rabbi Ahmed and Adnan Dhool | Nominated | |
| Filmfare Awards | 31 January 2015 | Best Playback Singer (Male) | Ankit Tiwari – "Galliyan" | Won | |
| Global Indian Music Academy Awards | 24 February 2015 | Best Music Director | Ankit Tiwari, Mithoon, Rabbi Ahmed and Adnan Dhool | Nominated | |
| Global Indian Music Academy Awards | 24 February 2015 | Best Lyricist | Manoj Muntashir – "Galliyan" | Nominated | |
| Global Indian Music Academy Awards | 24 February 2015 | Best Playback Singer (Male) | Ankit Tiwari – "Galliyan" | Nominated | |
| Global Indian Music Academy Awards | 24 February 2015 | Celebrity Singer of the Year | Shraddha Kapoor – "Galliyan" (Unplugged) | Won | |
| Global Indian Music Academy Awards | 24 February 2015 | Most Popular Song of the Year | "Galliyan" | Won | |
| Global Indian Music Academy Awards | 24 February 2015 | Best Music Debut | Shraddha Kapoor – "Galliyan" (Unplugged) | Nominated | |
| Global Indian Music Academy Awards | 24 February 2015 | Most Popular Singer of the Year | Ankit Tiwari – "Galliyan" | Won | |
| Global Indian Music Academy Awards | 24 February 2015 | Best Music Arranger and Programmer | Dhrubajyoti Phukan – "Awari" | Nominated | |
| Global Indian Music Academy Awards | 24 February 2015 | Best Engineer – Film Album | Eric Pillai | Won | |
| Global Indian Music Academy Awards | 24 February 2015 | Best Film Song | "Galliyan" | Nominated | |
| International Indian Film Academy Awards | 5–7 June 2015 | Best Music Director | Ankit Tiwari, Mithoon, Rabbi Ahmed and Adnan Dhool | Nominated | |
| International Indian Film Academy Awards | 5–7 June 2015 | Best Lyricist | Manoj Muntashir – "Galliyan" | Won | |
| International Indian Film Academy Awards | 5–7 June 2015 | Best Playback Singer (Male) | Ankit Tiwari – "Galliyan" | Won | |
| International Indian Film Academy Awards | 5–7 June 2015 | Best Sound Recording | Eric Pillai | Won | |
| Mirchi Music Awards | 27 February 2015 | Song of The Year | "Galliyan" | Nominated | |
| Mirchi Music Awards | 27 February 2015 | Album of The Year | Ankit Tiwari, Mithoon, Rabbi Ahmed, Adnan Dhool and Manoj Muntashir | Nominated | |
| Mirchi Music Awards | 27 February 2015 | Male Vocalist of The Year | Ankit Tiwari – "Galliyan" | Nominated | |
| Mirchi Music Awards | 27 February 2015 | Music Composer of The Year | Ankit Tiwari – "Galliyan" | Nominated | |
| Mirchi Music Awards | 27 February 2015 | Lyricist of The Year | Manoj Muntashir – "Galliyan" | Nominated | |
| Mirchi Music Awards | 27 February 2015 | Upcoming Female Vocalist of The Year | Shraddha Kapoor – "Galliyan" (Unplugged) | Nominated | |
| Mirchi Music Awards | 27 February 2015 | Upcoming Music Composer of The Year | Rabbi Ahmad and Adnan Dhool – "Awari" | Nominated | |
| Mirchi Music Awards | 27 February 2015 | Upcoming Lyricist of The Year | Rabbi Ahmad and Adnan Dhool – "Awari" | Nominated | |
| Mirchi Music Awards | 27 February 2015 | Listeners' Choice Album of the Year | Ankit Tiwari, Mithoon, Rabbi Ahmed, Adnan Dhool and Manoj Muntashir | Won | |
| Screen Awards | 14 January 2015 | Best Music Director | Ankit Tiwari, Mithoon, Rabbi Ahmed and Adnan Dhool | Won | |
| Screen Awards | 14 January 2015 | Best Lyricist | Mithoon – "Banjaara" | Nominated | |
| Screen Awards | 14 January 2015 | Best Playback Singer (Male) | Ankit Tiwari – "Galliyan" | Nominated | |
| Star Guild Awards (Note: Also known as Apsara Film & Television Producers Guild Awards.) | 12 January 2015 | Best Music Director | Ankit Tiwari – "Galliyan" | Won | |
| Star Guild Awards | 12 January 2015 | Best Lyricist | Manoj Muntashir – "Galliyan" | Nominated | |
| Star Guild Awards | 12 January 2015 | Best Playback Singer (Male) | Ankit Tiwari – "Galliyan" | Won | |
| Star Guild Awards | 12 January 2015 | Best Playback Singer (Male) | Arijit Singh – "Hamdard" | Nominated | |
| Stardust Awards | 15 December 2014 | Best Music Director | Ankit Tiwari, Mithoon, Rabbi Ahmed and Adnan Dhool | Nominated | |
| Stardust Awards | 15 December 2014 | Best Lyricist | Mithoon – "Banjaara" | Won | |
| Stardust Awards | 15 December 2014 | Best Playback Singer (Male) | Ankit Tiwari – "Galliyan" | Nominated | |
| Stardust Awards | 15 December 2014 | Best Playback Singer (Male) | Mohammed Irfan – "Banjaara" | Nominated | |
