= Roxen (band) =

Pakistani rock band

- Origin: Lahore, Punjab, Pakistan
- Genres: Alternative rock; pop rock
- Years active: 2004 - present
- Labels: T-Series, Sony BMG, Universal Music India, Saregama, Zee Music; Fire Records
- Members: Mustafa Zahid; Haider Halim; Shahan Khan
- Past members: Jawad (Jodi); Omar Halim
- Website: www.mustafazahid.com

Roxen (Urdu: روزن transl. Hope) is a Pakistani rock band from Lahore, Punjab, Pakistan. The band had a debut studio album Rozen-e-Deewar, released in 2006. Following this, the band had singles "Toh Phir Aao" and "Tera Mera Rishta" which featured as soundtracks for the Bollywood movie Awarapan in 2007.

== Music ==
Roxen was formed back in September 2004 with initial line up of Mustafa "Musti" Zahid, Jawad, known onstage as Jodi, and Omar. Their debut song was "Yaadein". After a couple of months they came out with web release of the demo song, "Toh Phir Aao", composed by Zahid, citing it as his first ever composition. The song registered over 65000 downloads in one month. The song was subsequently featured in the 2007 film Awarapan.

Roxen's debut album, Rozen-E-Deewar, was released on 31 August 2006, on Fire Records in Pakistan, Hom Records in India, and Sangeet Records in the United States, Canada, and the Middle East.

The release date for Roxen's second album, Bhoola Samundar, has not been announced. The album is scheduled to be released by Universal Music.

In 2015, Roxen released their single "Anjanay Raaston" for the drama series Mere Khwaab Lauta Do.

== Discography ==
=== Albums ===
Year	Title	Label
2006	Rozen-e-Deewar	Fire Records
2009	Bujh Hai Gaya	Fire Records
Cancelled	Bhoola Samundar	

=== Bollywood ===
Year	Song	Film
2007	"Toh Phir Aao"	Awarapan
2007	"Tera Mera Rishta"	Awarapan
2009	"Khuda Kay Liye"	Runway
2012	"Gunaah"	Blood Money
2012	"Teri Yaadon Se"	Blood Money
2012	"Jo Tere Sang"	Blood Money
2013	"Hum Jee Lenge"	Murder 3
2013	"Yeh Junoon Mera"	Shootout at Wadala
2013	"Bhula Dena"	Aashiqui 2
2014	"Mainay Khudko"	Ragini MMS 2
2014	"Teray Bina"	Heropanti
2014	"Zaroorat"	Ek Villain
2014	"Maula Mere"	Dr. Cabbie
2014	"Teri Adaaon Mein"	3 A.M.

=== Pakistani drama soundtrack ===
Year	Song	Drama Serial	TV Channel
2010	"Tere Liye"	Tere Liye	ARY Digital
2015	"Anjaane Raaston Mein"	Mere Khwaab Lauta Do	ARY Zindagi

=== Singles ===
- "Bujh Hay Gaya"
- "Meray Saathiya"
- "Kaisay Jiyein" - Also used in the Bollywood film Murder 3 as "Hum Jee Lenge"
- "Dil Main Tum" - Revised with Bunny
- "Na Kar Deewana" - Also used in the Bollywood film Awarapan as "Tera Mera Rishta"
- "Meray Saathiya" (2018)
- "Yeh Meri Zindagi Hai" (2026)

== Band members ==
=== Current members ===
As of 2026, the band has 3 members:

- Mustafa Zahid - Vocals, lyrics and compositions
- Haider Halim - guitars, backing vocals and compositions
- Shahan Khan - guitar backing Vocal

Bassist & Drummer are session player

== See also ==
- List of Pakistani music bands
