= 16th IIFA Awards =

Hindi film awards presented in 2015

- Date: 5 June 2015– 7 June 2015
- Site: Putra Indoor Stadium Kuala Lumpur, Malaysia
- Hosted by: Arjun Kapoor; Ranveer Singh

Highlights
- Best Picture: Queen
- Best Direction: Rajkumar Hirani (PK)
- Best Actor: Shahid Kapoor (Haider)
- Best Actress: Kangana Ranaut (Queen)
- Most awards: Haider (9)
- Most nominations: Haider (14)

Television coverage
- Channel: Colors TV
- Network: Colors TV

The 2015 IIFA Awards, officially known as the 16th International Indian Film Academy Awards ceremony, presented by the International Indian Film Academy honouring the best Hindi films of 2014, took place on 5 June 2015. The official ceremony took place on 7 June 2015 in Ritz Carlton Kuala Lumpur, Malaysia. The ceremony was televised in India and internationally on Colors for the first time. The ceremony was co–hosted by actors Arjun Kapoor and Ranveer Singh, for the first time as hosts. This show was telecasted on colors on Sunday 5 July 2015, 8pm.

IIFA Rocks, otherwise known as the IIFA Music and Fashion Extravaganza took place on 5 June 2015.

2 States led the ceremony with 9 nominations, followed by Haider with 8 nominations, PK with 6 nominations, and Ek Villain and Queen with 5 nominations each.

Haider won 9 awards, including Best Actor (for Shahid Kapoor), Best Supporting Actress (for Tabu), and Best Villain (Kay Kay Menon), thus becoming the most-awarded film at the ceremony.

== Winners and nominees ==
=== Popular awards ===
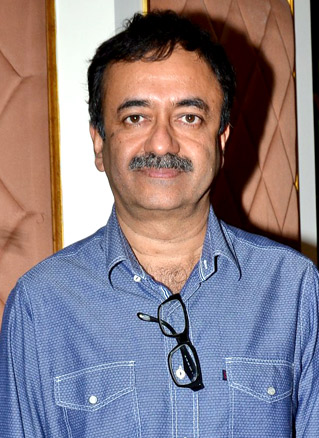
Rajkumar Hirani (Best Director)

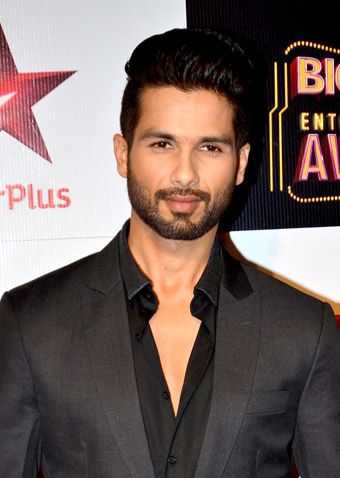
Shahid Kapoor (Best Actor)

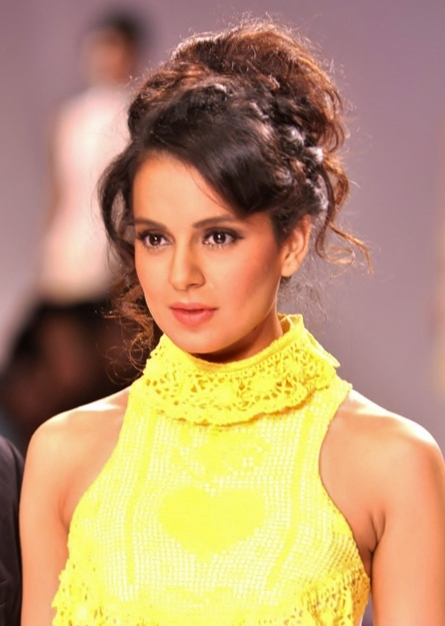
Kangana Ranaut (Best Actress)

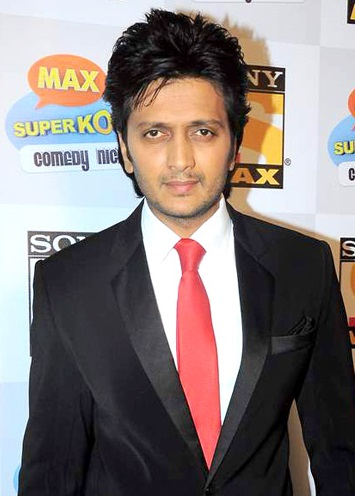
Riteish Deshmukh (Best Supporting Actor)

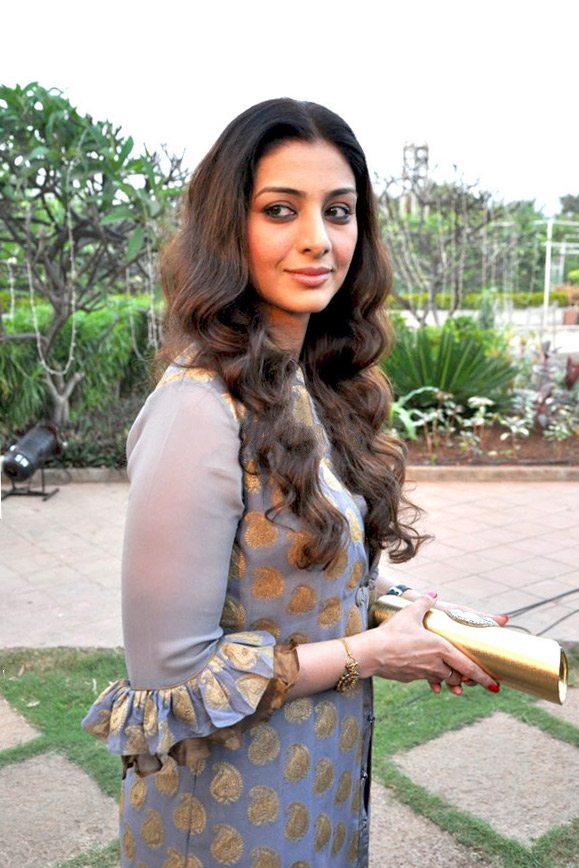
Tabu (Best Supporting Actress)

Best Film	Best Director
Queen – Phantom Films; 2 States – Dharma Productions, Nadiadwala Grandson Entertainment; Haider – UTV Motion Pictures, VB Pictures; Highway – Window Seat Films, Nadiadwala Grandson Entertainment; Mary Kom – Bhansali Productions; PK – Vinod Chopra Films, Rajkumar Hirani Films	Rajkumar Hirani – PK; Abhishek Varman – 2 States; Imtiaz Ali – Highway; Vikas Bahl – Queen; Vishal Bhardwaj – Haider
Best Actor	Best Actress
Shahid Kapoor – Haider as Haider Meer; Aamir Khan – PK as PK; Arjun Kapoor – 2 States as Krish Malhotra; Hrithik Roshan – Bang Bang as Rajveer / Jai Nanda; Randeep Hooda – Highway as Mahabir Bhati; Shah Rukh Khan – Happy New Year as Chandramohan Manohar Sharma a.k.a. Charlie	Kangana Ranaut – Queen as Rani Mehra; Alia Bhatt – 2 States as Ananya Swaminathan; Anushka Sharma – PK as Jagat "Jaggu" Janani Sahni; Deepika Padukone – Happy New Year as Mohini Joshi; Priyanka Chopra – Mary Kom as Mary Kom; Rani Mukerji – Mardaani as Shivani Shivaji Roy
Best Supporting Actor	Best Supporting Actress
Riteish Deshmukh – Ek Villain as Rakesh Mahadkar; Inaamulhaq – Filmistaan as Aftaab; Kay Kay Menon – Haider as Khurram Meer; Naseeruddin Shah – Finding Fanny as Ferdinand "Ferdie" Pinto; Randeep Hooda – Kick as Himanshu Tyagi; Ronit Roy – 2 States as Vikram Malhotra (Krish's father)	Tabu – Haider as Ghazala Meer; Amrita Singh – 2 States as Kavita Malhotra (Krish's mother); Huma Qureshi – Dedh Ishqiya as Muniya; Juhi Chawla – Gulaab Gang as Sumitra Devi; Lisa Haydon – Queen as Vijayalakshmi
Best Male Debut	Best Female Debut
Tiger Shroff – Heropanti as Bablu	Kriti Sanon – Heropanti as Dimpy
Best Performance In A Comic Role	Best Performance In A Negative Role
Varun Dhawan – Main Tera Hero as Seenu; Govinda – Happy Ending as Armaan; Sanjay Dutt – PK as Bhairon Singh; Sharib Hashmi – Filmistaan as Sunny	Kay Kay Menon – Haider as Khurram Meer; Nawazuddin Siddiqui – Kick as Shiv Gajra; Ritesh Deshmukh – Ek Villain as Rakesh Mahadkar
Best Story	Debutant Director
Vikas Bahl, Chaitally Parmar, Parveez Shaikh – Queen; Abhijat Joshi & Rajkumar Hirani – PK; Chetan Bhagat – 2 States	Abhishek Varman – 2 States; Omung Kumar – Mary Kom

=== Special awards ===
IIFA Award for Outstanding Achievement in International Cinema
- Subhash Ghai

IIFA Award for Woman of the Year
- Deepika Padukone

=== Musical awards ===
Best Music Direction	Best Lyrics
2 States – Shankar–Ehsaan–Loy; Ek Villain – Mithoon, Ankit Tiwari and Soch; Haider – Vishal Bhardwaj; Yaariyan – Pritam Chakraborty, Yo Yo Honey Singh, Mithoon, Arko Pravo Mukherjee	Manoj Muntashir – "Galliyan" – Ek Villain; Amitabh Bhattacharya – "Mast Magan" – 2 States; Rashmi Singh – "Muskurane" – CityLights
Best Male Playback Singer	Best Female Playback Singer
Ankit Tiwari – Galliyan" – Ek Villain; Arijit Singh – "Muskurane" – CityLights; Mika Singh – "Jumme Ki Raat" – Kick; Sukhwinder Singh – "Bismil" – Haider	Kanika Kapoor – "Baby Doll" – Ragini MMS 2; Nooran Sisters – "Patakha Guddi" – Highway; Shreya Ghoshal – "Samjhawan" – Humpty Sharma Ki Dulhania
Best Sound Design	Best Background Score
Shajith Koyeri – Haider	Vishal Bhardwaj – Haider

=== Technical awards ===
Best Action	Best Special Effects
Parvez Shaikh & Andy Armstrong – Bang Bang	Reupal Rawal (Prime Focus) – Kick
Best Choreography	Best Cinematography
Ahmed Khan – Kick	Binod Pradhan – 2 States
Best Costume Design	Best Dialogue
Dolly Ahluwalia – Haider	Abhijat Joshi & Rajkumar Hirani – PK
Best Editing	Best Makeup
Anurag Kashyap & Abhijit Kokate – Queen	Preetisheel Singh & Clover Wootton – Haider
Best Production Design	Best Screenplay
Subrata Chakraborty & Amit Ray – Haider	Vikas Bahl, Chaitally Parmar & Parveez Shaikh – Queen
Best Sound Mixing	Best Sound Recording
Debajit Changmai – Haider	Eric Pillai – "Galliyan" – Ek Villain

== Superlatives ==
Films with multiple nominations
Nominations	Film
9	2 States
8	Haider
6	PK
5	Ek Villain
5	Queen
4	Highway
4	Kick
3	Mary Kom
2	CityLights
2	Filmistaan
2	Happy New Year

Films with multiple awards
Awards	Film
9	Haider
5	Queen
4	Ek Villain
3	Kick
2	2 States
2	Heropanti
2	PK

== See also ==
- International Indian Film Academy Awards
- Bollywood
- Cinema of India
