= Mustafa Zahid =

Pakistani music composer and cricketer (born 1984)

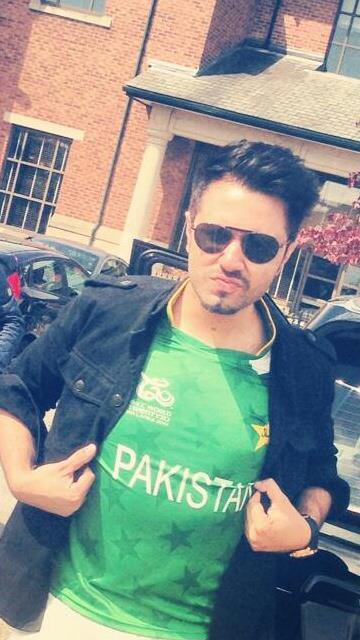

Background information
- Born: Mustafa Zahid; 18 December 1984 (age 41)
- Origin: Lahore, Punjab, Pakistan
- Genres: Filmi; pop; rock
- Occupations: Playback singer; musician; cricketer
- Instruments: Vocals; guitar
- Years active: 2004–present
- Labels: Fire Records, Saregama, Sony Music, T-Series
- Member of: Roxen

Mustafa Zahid (born 18 December 1984) is a Pakistani music composer and singer-songwriter who gained success with his 2007 singles "Toh Phir Aao" and "Tera Mera Rishta." He has sung several hit songs for Bollywood films and is also the lead vocalist of Roxen, a rock band formed in 2004.

== Early life and education ==
Mustafa was born in Lahore. He is the Nephew of Ali Azmat, the former lead vocalist of the famous rock band Roxen, and is also related to the late Sufi kalam singer, actor, director, and producer Inayat Hussain Bhatti. As a child, he never thought he would become a singer. He once hosted a college event where his professors asked him to sing. Hesitantly, he sang a few lines of "Bheegi Bheegi Raaton Mein," and this experience motivated him to pursue a career in singing.

He graduated from University of Central Punjab's Punjab College of Business Administration (PCBA) and later did his Master's from the National College of Arts (NCA), Lahore.

== Music career ==
=== Roxen ===
He formed the rock band Roxen in 2004; "Roxen" comes from the Persian language, and means as per Mustafa "a small window or a hole in a criminal cell from which the light gets in and provides hope and freshness." Their debut album, Rozen-E-Deewar, was released in late 2006 and topped charts across South Asia for nearly six weeks. The album's Indian release took place in mid-December 2008. Universal Music had signed Mustafa Zahid and Roxen for the worldwide release of their upcoming album.

=== Bollywood ===
In mid-2007, two of Mustafa Zahid's songs were featured in the Bollywood movie Awarapan. He has since sung over a dozen Bollywood songs, including major hits in films such as Aashiqui 2 and Ek Villain.

== Discography ==
=== Albums ===
Year	Song	Note
2006	Rozen-E-Deewar	Fire Records
2009	Bujh Hai Gaya	Fire Records

=== Singles ===
Year	Song	Note
2008	Bujh Hai Gaya	Official Music Video (Song from Roxen's Album Bujh Hai Gaya)
2010	Karam Ker Day	Various Artist Song
2011	Dil Mein Tum	Revised with Bunny
2012	Na Kar Deewana	Official Music Video (Song from Roxen's Album Bujh Hai Gaya)
2013	Diye Se Diya Jalao	Various Artist Song (Music Video)
2015	Yeh Banday Mitti Kay Banday	Tribute
2018	Meray Saathiya	Single
2020	Ranjhna Ve	In The Box by Saad Sultan
2021	Kaisay Jiyein	Official Music Video (Song from Roxen's Unreleased Album Bhoola Samundar)
2022	Mela Sajan Hai	Official anthem for the Mega Stars League (MSL)
2023	Chupke Se	Single
2023	Bekhudi	Single
2023	To Phir Aao	Reprise from film Awarapan
2023	Mera Pakistan	
2024	Tamasha (ft. Yashal Shahid)	The Artist Season 1
2024	Baarish	Single
2025	Phir Se Baarish	Single
2026	Yeh Meri Zindagi Hai	Single
2026	Tera Mera Rishta 2.0	Single

=== Bollywood ===
Year	Song	Film	Music director(s)	Lyrics
2007	"Toh Phir Aao"	Awarapan	Pritam	Sayeed Quadri
2007	"Tera Mera Rishta"	Awarapan	Pritam	Sayeed Quadri
2007	"Tera Mera Rishta" (Remix)	Awarapan	Pritam	Sayeed Quadri
2007	"Toh Phir Aao" (Remix)	Awarapan	Pritam	Sayeed Quadri
2007	"Toh Phir Aao" (Lounge Version)	Awarapan	Pritam	Sayeed Quadri
2009	"Khuda Ke Liye"	Runway	Shamir Tandon	Shabbir Ahmed
2012	"Gunaah"	Blood Money	Jeet Gannguli	Sayeed Quadri
2012	"Jo Tere Sang"	Blood Money	Jeet Gannguli	Sayeed Quadri
2012	"Teri Yaadon Se"	Blood Money	Pranay Rijia	Sayeed Quadri
2013	"Hum Jee Lenge"	Murder 3	Roxen	Sayeed Quadri
2013	"Yeh Junoon Mera"	Shootout at Wadala	Mustafa Zahid	Kumaar
2013	"Bhula Dena"	Aashiqui 2	Jeet Gannguli	Sanjay Masoomm
2014	"Maine Khud Ko"	Ragini MMS 2	Pranay Rijia	Kumaar
2014	"Tere Binaa"	Heropanti	Mustafa Zahid	
2014	"Zaroorat"	Ek Villain	Mithoon	
2014	"Maula Mere"	Dr. Cabbie	Siddharth Suhaas	Kumaar
2014	"Teri Adaaon Mein"	3 A.M.	Pranay Rijia	

=== Replaced Bollywood Songs ===
Year	Song	Film	Music director(s)	Replaced Singer(s)
2019	"Intezaari"	Article 15	Anurag Saikia	Armaan Malik
2019	"Ki Honda Pyar"	Jabariya Jodi	Vishal Mishra	Arijit Singh
2019	"Ek Mulaqat"	Dream Girl	Meet Bros	Altamash Faridi
2019	"Main Janta Hoon"	The Body	Shamir Tandon	Jubin Nautiyal
2020	"Mujhse Door"	N/A	DJ AKS and DJ Suketu	N/A

=== Lollywood ===
Year	Song	Film	Music director(s)
2016	"Udasiyaan"	Zindagi Kitni Haseen Hay	Soch, Udan Khatola, and Sohail Haider
2016	"Udasiyan" (Slow Version)	Zindagi Kitni Haseen Hay	Soch, Udan Khatola, and Sohail Haider

=== Drama Soundtrack ===
Year	Song	Drama Serial	TV Channel
2010	"Tere Liye"	Tere Liye	ARY Digital
2015	"Anjaane Raaston Mein"	Mere Khwaab Lauta Do	ARY Digital
2019	"Dil Kiya Karay"	Dil Kiya Karay	GEO Entertainment

=== International ===
Year	Single	Artists	Record label
2013	Turn the Night Up (DJ AKS Remix)	Enrique Iglesias, DJ AKS, Mustafa Zahid	
