= IIFA Award for Best Art Direction =

Annual film award in India

The IIFA Award for Best Art Direction is a technical award chosen ahead of the ceremonies.

== Multiple wins ==
Wins	Recipient
4	Sabu Cyril

== Awards ==
The winners are listed below:-

Year	Winner	Film
2017	Apara Sud & Ananya Ipe	Neerja
2016	Saloni Dhatrak, Sriram Iyengar & Sujeet Sawant	Bajirao Mastani
2015	Subrata Chakraborty & Amit Ray	Haider
2014	Wasiq Khan	Goliyon Ki Raasleela Ram-Leela
2013	Rajat Poddar	Barfi!
2012	Sabu Cyril	Ra.One
2011	Sabu Cyril	Robot
2010	Sabu Cyril	Aladin
2009	Nitin Chandrakant Desai	Jodhaa Akbar
2008	Sabu Cyril	Om Shanti Om

== See also ==
- IIFA Awards
- Bollywood
- Cinema of India
