= Awarapan =

2007 Indian film by Mohit Suri

- Theatrical release poster
- Directed by: Mohit Suri
- Written by: Shagufta Rafique
- Story by: Honey Irani; Mahesh Bhatt
- Produced by: Mukesh Bhatt
- Starring: Emraan Hashmi; Shriya Saran; Mrinalini Sharma; Ashutosh Rana; Shaad Randhawa
- Cinematography: Raaj Chakravarti
- Edited by: Aditya Joshi
- Music by: Songs: Pritam; Mustafa Zahid; Score: Raju Singh
- Production company: Vishesh Films
- Release date: 29 June 2007 (India)
- Running time: 133 minutes
- Country: India
- Language: Hindi
- Budget: ₹18 crore
- Box office: ₹12–12.25 crore

Awarapan (transl. Vagrancy) is a 2007 Indian Hindi-language romantic crime action film directed by Mohit Suri, written by Shagufta Rafique, and produced by Mukesh Bhatt. An uncredited remake of the South Korean film A Bittersweet Life, it stars Emraan Hashmi, Shriya Saran, Mrinalini Sharma, and Ashutosh Rana. In the film, gangster Shivam Pandit (Hashmi) is ordered by his boss Bharat Malik (Rana) to watch over Reema (Sharma), Malik's secret Pakistani mistress.

Awarapan was theatrically released on 29 June 2007. Despite receiving positive reviews from critics, the film emerged as a box-office bomb, but later gained cult status, eventually being regarded as one of Hashmi and Suri's best works.

A sequel, Awarapan 2, was released in 2026.

== Plot ==
Shivam is a heartbroken and introverted atheist, gangster, and right-hand man of Bharat Malik, a criminal gangster and businessman who runs a chain of hotels in Hong Kong. Shivam is given responsibility for one of the hotels, which he bears capably, making it more successful than Malik's other hotels. Malik holds Shivam in the highest esteem due to Shivam's loyalty, reliability, and business acumen. He treats him like an adored son, entrusting him with almost everything. This causes jealousy in Bharat's biological son, Ronnie, against Shivam, but because of Malik's outspoken support for Shivam, Ronnie does not dare to oppose him openly. Shivam has a very close childhood friend, Kabir, who assists him with everything. Meanwhile, Malik's brother Rajan and Rajan's spoiled son Munna hold a grudge against Shivam because of Shivam's repeated conflicts with Munna.

One day, Malik asks Shivam to keep an eye on his young mistress Reema, whom he suspects of having an affair with someone else, while he is away on a brief business trip. Reema is a young Pakistani girl, devout Muslim, and a victim of sex trafficking, whom Malik had "bought" in the Bangkok flesh market. If Reema is found cheating on Malik, Shivam must inform him immediately.

In his interactions with Reema, Shivam recalls his lost love, Aliyah, in a series of flashbacks. Aliyah was a devout Muslim whom Shivam had once met by chance in the marketplace. The duo eventually fell in love, but when her father saw them together, he confronted them and physically reprimanded Aliyah. He also exposed Shivam's gangster background to a shocked Aliyah, leading to Shivam instantly offering her father his gun, saying that he was willing to let go of everything, start anew, and legitimately provide for Aliyah if he was allowed to be with her. Aliyah's father shoots at Shivam with the gun, who ducks to avoid the bullet. However, it ends up hitting and killing Aliyah, which temporarily drives Shivam over the edge and permanently gives him a feeling of guilt and sorrow at Aliyah having died because he tried to save himself. Aliyah's father instantly commits suicide when he realizes what he has done.

One night, Shivam discovers that Reema has a secret boyfriend named Bilal, who convinces her to run away with him back to Pakistan. Shivam informs Malik, who orders Reema's elimination. However, when he confronts the couple to eliminate them, she dares him to shoot her, claiming that freedom is her right, requesting mercy "for God's sake". Shivam is reminded of Aliyah's religious mannerisms, which bear a strong resemblance to Reema's, and is unable to shoot her, leaving her alive. Malik tries to reach Shivam, who severs contact with him, leading Malik to learn about his disobedience.

Shivam plans to quickly run back to India from Hong Kong with Kabir, who is extremely unwilling to do so. Eventually, he betrays Shivam to Malik, whose regard for Kabir increases. Malik has Shivam captured and orders Ronnie to torture Shivam until he agrees to kill Reema when Shivam refuses to do so even after Malik offers him a second chance. Malik is now genuinely hurt and sorrowful at what he perceives as Shivam's betrayal, and he hands over Shivam's responsibilities in the business to Kabir. Malik makes up the old feud with Rajan and Munna and merges their gangs and businesses, with Malik demanding that Shivam be brought before him alive so that Malik can kill him personally. This occurs in the presence of Kabir, who is now bitterly penitent to the point of not wishing to live any more over his betrayal of Shivam.

Shivam manages to escape Ronnie and seeks refuge in the monastery of Siddharth Sood, a Buddhist monk whom he had once set free from certain death. He recovers from his injuries, and, reminded of Aliyah and her belief in freedom, decides not to continue running all his life to save his own skin, but to "fulfill someone else's dreams" (unite Bilal and Reema and send them to Pakistan). He manages to save Bilal from Malik's henchmen, led by Kabir, whom Shivam still trusts and regards as his best friend, who tearfully reiterates that he is ready to die for Shivam, as he always was. Kabir takes Bilal to the monastery, where arrangements are made to ship Bilal and Reema to Lahore.

Shivam tracks Reema and kills Rajan. He then tricks Munna into revealing Malik's plans for Reema: to sell her to the person who "enjoys" her the most. Munna tells Shivam everything about it, including the location, believing him to be crippled by his wounds, and is immediately killed by Shivam upon realizing that is not the case. Shivam finds Reema and Malik, who is enraged at his standing against Malik, when he had cared for Shivam so much, deriding Shivam's new belief in God and freedom. Shivam kills Malik and escapes with Reema to the shipping docks, where Bilal is waiting. Kabir shows up to fight Malik's men and buy Shivam time, and he is brutally murdered in the process. Bilal manages to force a reluctant Reema to escape to the ship, who is hesitant to leave Shivam behind. Ronnie and his men arrive, and a gunfight follows, killing everyone, including Ronnie. Gravely injured and apparently breathing his final moments, Shivam dreams of finally reuniting with Aliyah in heaven. The film ends with Reema in a conference in Pakistan, where she tells her story of the man who sacrificed his life to save her, and incites those present to stand up for victims of trafficking.

== Cast ==
- Emraan Hashmi as Shivam Pandit
- Shriya Saran as Aaliyah Hamid
- Mrinalini Sharma as Reema Zaidi
- Ashutosh Rana as Bharat Malik
- Ashish Vidyarthi as Rajan Malik
- Shaad Randhawa as Kabir Bahl
- Salil Acharya as Ronnie Malik
- Purab Kohli as Manoj “Munna” Malik
- Atul Parchure as Siddharth Sood
- Rehan Khan as Bilal

== Production ==
Some scenes were shot in Lahore, making it one of the few Indian films to have been filmed in Pakistan. Other scenes were filmed in Rajasthan, Hong Kong and Bangkok.

== Soundtrack ==
Awarapan

Soundtrack album by Pritam Chakraborty
- Released: 3 June 2007
- Genre: Feature Film soundtrack
- Length: 42:33
- Labels: Vishesh Films and Sony Music India
- Producer: Pritam Chakraborty

Pritam Chakraborty chronology
Dhol (2007)	Awarapan (2007)	Raqeeb (2007)

The soundtrack was composed by Pritam. The vocals were provided by Mustafa Zahid, Suzanne D'Mello, Rafaqat Ali Khan and Annie Khalid. The lyrics were written by Sayeed Quadri, Asif Ali Baig and Annie Khalid. All the remix versions were produced by DJ Suketu and arranged by Aks. The soundtrack was highly appreciated by the audiences and critics and was one of the top albums of 2007.

The songs "Toh Phir Aao" and "Tera Mera Rishta" were adapted from songs originally composed by the band Roxen, from their album Rozen-e-Deewar with Mustafa Zahid later stating that former song was his first ever composition. "Tera Mera Rishta" was based on the song "Lams" from the same album, which featured the lines "aana jaana, na kar deewana". According to Zahid, Mohit Suri requested that the lyrics be changed to better suit the sequence in the film in which Shivam turns to God following Aaliyah's demise. Sayeed Quadri subsequently rewrote and expanded the song's lyrics, with the revised song being released as "Tera Mera Rishta".

=== Track listing ===
No.	Title	Lyrics	Music	Singer(s)	Length
1.	"Tera Mera Rishta"	Sayeed Quadri	Pritam Chakraborty	Mustafa Zahid	5:47
2.	"Toh Phir Aao"	Sayeed Quadri	Pritam Chakraborty	Mustafa Zahid	5:48
3.	"Mahiya"	Sayeed Quadri	Pritam Chakraborty	Suzanne D'Mello	4:24
4.	"Maula Maula (Note: Lyrics by Baba Farid.)"	Sayeed Quadri, Baba Farid	Pritam Chakraborty	Rafaqat Ali Khan	5:24
5.	"Tera Mera Rishta" (Remix)	Sayeed Quadri	Pritam Chakraborty	Mustafa Zahid	4:54
6.	"Toh Phir Aao" (Remix)	Sayeed Quadri	Pritam Chakraborty	Mustafa Zahid	5:09
7.	"Toh Phir Aao" (Lounge Version)	Sayeed Quadri	Pritam Chakraborty	Mustafa Zahid	5:55
8.	"Mahiya" (Remix)	Sayeed Quadri, Annie Khalid	DJ Suketu & Annie Khalid	Annie Khalid	5:12
Total length:					42:33

== Reception ==
Taran Adarsh from Bollywood Hungama gave the film 3.5 stars out of 5 and praised the direction, music, dialogue and performances, while noting the film's excessive violence could act as a deterrent for several viewers. Rajeev Masand gave the film 3 stars out of 5 and felt the film had an "international look" owing to its action scenes and the Hong Kong skyline; he also praised the music and found the carnage sequences to have a "strange beauty". However, he criticized the slow pace, violence content and felt the film did not get to the characters' emotional core. Jaspreet Pandohar from BBC similarly gave the film 3 stars, describing it as an "engaging, albeit violent, drama" and praising Hashmi's performance, while feeling disappointed that more was not made of the issue of human trafficking.

Khalid Mohamed from Hindustan Times gave the film 2 stars out of 5 and criticized the slow pacing, violence, while praising Hashmi's performance and Pritam's music. Ajit N. from Rediff.com gave the film 1.5 stars out of 5 and felt Rana and Saran were wasted.

== Sequel ==
A sequel, Awarapan 2 directed by Nitin Kakkar was released on 14 August 2026. Emraan Hashmi reprised his role alongside Disha Patani and Shabana Azmi in pivotal roles.
