= Oye Jassie =

- Genre: Sitcom
- Based on: Jessie by Pamela Eells O'Connell
- Creative director: Seher Bedi
- Theme music composer: Toby Gad; Lindy Robbins
- Country of origin: India
- Original language: Hindi
- No. of seasons: 1
- No. of episodes: 26

Production
- Production company: Magic Works Entertainment

Original release
- Network: Disney Channel
- Release: 13 October 2013 – 6 April 2014

Related
- Jessie

Oye Jassie is an Indian television sitcom that premiered on Disney Channel India on 13 October 2013. It is an Indian adaptation of the American Disney Channel sitcom Jessie. The show stars Tara Sutaria in the title role of Jassie aka Jaspreet Singh. It premiered with the episode "Mumbai, New Nanny".

== Plot ==
The series follows Jassie Singh, a young woman from a small town with big dreams who, rebelling against her strict father, decides to leave the military base in Karnal where she grew up and moves to Mumbai. She accepts a job as a nanny and moves into a multimillion-dollar penthouse with the wealthy Malhotra family which includes jet-setting parents Rahul and Riesha Malhotra and their four rambunctious kids: Ayesha, Rocky, Subbu, and Tia, along with the family pet, Shri Premchand, a seven-foot Asian water monitor lizard, that was later revealed to be a female. With a whole new world of experiences open to her, Jassie embarks on new adventures in the big city as she grows to rely on the love and support of the family in her care. Assisting her are Tony (Kenneth Desai), the family's lazy and sarcastic butler, and Lucky (Devansh Doshi), the building's 20-year-old receptionist.

== Cast ==
=== Main ===
- Tara Sutaria as Jaspreet "Jassie" Singh, an idealistic and resourceful girl from a military base in Karnal. As a recent high school graduate rebelling against her strict father who wanted her to join the army, Jassie moved to Mumbai to realize her dreams of stardom but, due to an unexpected turn of events, ends up becoming a nanny to the four Malhotra children. Even though at times both Jassie and the kids annoy each other, they all deeply care for one another and Jassie is even shown to be sometimes overprotective. Jassie is equivalent to Jessie Prescott, played by Debby Ryan.
- Mohit Bagri as Rocky Malhothra, a laid back, flirty, crafty boy who was born in West Bengal and has a passion for video games, break-dancing, and causing mischief around the penthouse while also being sarcastic at times. He considers himself a "ladies' man", having taken a liking to Jassie in particular. Rocky even tried to date her in the first few episodes. Rocky is the second oldest of the Malhotra children. He spends a lot of time with his brother, Subbu, and has a close bond with Tony as well. Rocky is equivalent to Luke Ross, played by Cameron Boyce.
- Ahsaas Channa as Ayesha Malhotra, an arrogant, somewhat ditsy, cynical girl, eager to reorder the world to the way she wants it. Ayesha is the oldest child of the Malhotra family, and Rahul and Reisha's only biological child. She spends most of her time with Tiya and doesn't appreciate her brother Rocky. Ayesha is equivalent to Emma Ross, played by Peyton List.
- Diya Chalwad as Tiya Malhotra, a sassy, strong-willed, quick-witted and talkative girl. She is highly creative with a penchant for rainbows, unicorns, mermaids, and country music, and has many stuffed animals and imaginary friends. She is the youngest of the Malhotra children. She has close bonds with Jassie, Ayesha, and her imaginary friends. Tiya is equivalent to Zuri Ross, played by Skai Jackson.
- Ved Tarde as Subbramaniam "Subbu" Malhotra, a gentle, intelligent and courteous boy, born and raised for ten and a half years in Sri Lanka, and the newest addition to the Malhotra family. He is imbued with the culture of his beloved homeland, but is thrilled with his new life in Mumbai. He is the third oldest of the Malhotra children and also the most intelligent. He spends most of his time with Rocky, but appreciates his sisters all the same. He also spends time with his lizard, Shri Premchand, which he brought from Sri Lanka. Subbu is equivalent to Ravi Ross played by Karan Brar, and Shri Premchand is equivalent to Mrs. Kipling.
- Kenneth Desai as Tony, the Malhotra family's butler. He is grouchy and often very lazy, though begrudgingly helps Jassie navigate her job as nanny to the four Malhotra children. He also has a passion for opera music and boy bands. Even though the Malhotra kids, as well as Jassie, get on his nerves sometimes, he deeply cares about them. Tony is equivalent to Bertram played by Kevin Chamberlin.

=== Recurring ===
- Devansh Doshi as Lucky Luckendra Singh, Apartment Receptionist and Jassie's Boyfriend and helps her navigate her adventures in the big city. He is equivalent to Tony the doorman played by Chris Galya.
- Jhumma Mitra as Mrs. Raheja, neighbor having a crush on Tony. She is equivalent to Mrs Chesterfield, who is played by Carolyn Hennesy.
- Simple Kaul as Reisha Malhotra, Rahul's wife, is the mother of the four Malhotra children and a former supermodel turned business magnate. She is equivalent to Christina Ross, played by Christina Moore.
- Harsh Vashisht as Rahul Malhotra, is the father of the four Malhotra children and a famous movie director. He is equivalent to Morgan Ross played by Charles Esten.

=== Guest ===
- Shilpa Dhar as Sundari and Shoma. Sundari is a nanny trying to exploit Jassie and Shoma is Sundari's twin sister who was also evil of Jassie
- Ankit Gupta as Rodney Kapoor, a young superstar starred in Rahul's film
- Rajen Vyas as Ronie G
- Simran Natekar as Minnie Roy
- Vishal Jethwa as Vivek
- Raj Anadkat as Don Patel
- Kajol Srivastav as Neena
- Gautam Ahuja as Manuj

== Production ==
Oye Jassie was developed as the Indian adaptation of the American Disney Channel sitcom Jessie. Produced by Magic Works Entertainment for Disney Channel India, the series localized the original program by relocating the setting from New York City to Mumbai and adapting the characters and storylines to reflect Indian culture while preserving the premise of a young woman from a small town becoming the nanny to four children of a wealthy family.
