= S. B. John =

Pakistani singer (1934–2021)

Sunny Benjamin John PP
- Born: October 1930; Karachi, Bombay Presidency, British India
- Died: 5 June 2021 (aged 90); Karachi, Sindh, Pakistan
- Other name: S. B. John
- Occupation: Singer
- Years active: 1950 – 2010
- Employer: Radio Pakistan
- Notable work: song in the 1959 film Savera (1959)
- Awards: Pride of Performance Award by the President of Pakistan in 2011

Sunny Benjamin John (Urdu: سنی بَینجمن جان; 1930 – 5 June 2021), popularly known as S. B. John (Urdu: ایس بی جان), was a singer from Karachi, Pakistan.

== Personal life ==
He was educated at St Paul's English High School, Karachi. He was married in 1957. He has four sons and a daughter. Accompanied by his wife and two sons namely Robin and Glenn John, John used to sing gospel on Christmas Eve, on PTV. Two of his sons are musicians and one a singer. His son, Glenn John was part of Pakistani pop music band - Guru's Trilogy. Indian film producer Mahesh Bhatt re-recorded John's 1959 song 'Tu Jo Nahin Hai' in the voice of his son, Glenn John. Bhatt also used this song in his 2006 film Woh Lamhe....

== Career ==
He was born in Karachi and he started his singing career from Radio Pakistan in 1950. His inspiration was his grandfather who was also a singer. His first music teacher was Pandit Ram Chandar Trivedi at the Kalyan Sangeet Vidyala. When television was introduced in Karachi in 1967, John began singing gospel music on Christmas Eve on Pakistan Television. He also performed in stage shows in Karachi. S. B. John rose to fame by recording popular Urdu poetry known as ghazals in his vocals and music.

His best known song was for the 1959 film Savera "Tu Jo Nahin Hai, Tau Kuchh Bhi Naheen Hai". The composer was Master Manzoor Hussain, and lyrics were written by a renowned poet of Pakistan, Fayyaz Hashmi. This song also started the career as a music director of M. Ashraf who went on to become a popular music director in the Pakistani film industry.

John almost missed out when he caught flu on the day of the recording. Fortunately Manzoor Hussain insisted he perform and was wowed by the result.

== Awards and recognition ==
- Pride of Performance Award by the President of Pakistan in 2011 for his services in the field of music.

John has been listed among the 20 best Pakistani ghazal singers of all time.

== Recent activity ==
In November 2019, he served as one of the judges on a panel of judges consisting of veteran musicians on Obhartay Sitaray (Budding Stars) – an annual inter-school singing competition for students sponsored by The Citizens Foundation of Pakistan annually.

John led a retired life in Karachi until his death on 5 June 2021.
