= Shaad Randhawa =

Indian film actor

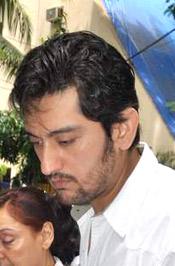
- Randhawa in 2011
- Born: 21 November 1978 (age 47); Mumbai, Maharashtra, India
- Occupation: Actor
- Years active: 2006–present
- Parent(s): Randhawa (father); Malika (mother)
- Family: Randhawa family

Shaad Randhawa (born 21 November 1978) is an Indian actor. In 2006, Shaad made his film debut with Mohit Suri's Woh Lamhe.... He is the son of Indian wrestler and actor Randhawa and Malika (sister of actress Mumtaz).

== Career ==
Shaad started his career with the film Woh Lamhe as Nikhil Rai. After that he played roles in Awarapan, Dhoom Dadakaa, Rokkk and Aashiqui 2. Shashi Ranjan's Dhoom Dadakka was Shaad's first film where he played the lead role. Shaad made his TV debut with Ekta Kapoor's Chandrakanta, where he played the role of Swayam.

== Filmography ==
Key
†	Denotes films that have not yet been released

Year	Film	Role	Notes	Ref.
2006	Woh Lamhe	Nikhil Rai		
2007	Awarapan	Kabir		
2008	Dhoom Dadakka	Rahul / Kamal		
2010	Rokkk	Ranvir		
2013	Aashiqui 2	Vivek		
2014	Ek Villain	CBI Officer Aditya Rathore		
2016	Mastizaade	DeshPremi / DeshDrohi		
2018	Hate Story 4	Ashwin		
2019	Saand Ki Aankh	Rambir Tomar		
2019	Marjaavaan	Mazhar		
2020	Malang	Advait's friend		
2021	Mumbai Saga	Jagannath		
2021	Satyameva Jayate 2	Sardara Singh		
2022	Ek Villain Returns	CBI Officer Aditya Rathore		
2025	Saiyaara	Prince		
2025	Ek Deewane Ki Deewaniyat	Sawant		
2025	Mastiii 4	Virat		
2026	Awarapan 2	Kabir	Cameo appearance	

=== Television ===
Year	Serial	Role
2017–2018	Chandrakanta	Prince Swayam of Vijaygarh/ Beast
2018–2019	Kumkum Bhagya	Nikhil Sood
2023	Scam 2003	Fahim Sheikh
