= Rokkk =

- Film poster
- Directed by: Rajesh Ranshinge
- Story by: Rajesh Ranshinge
- Produced by: Sumeet Saigal; Krishnan Choudhary; Vipin Jain
- Starring: Tanushree Dutta; Udita Goswami; Sachin Khedekar; Shaad Randhawa; Murli Sharma; Ashwini Kalsekar; Nishigandha Wad; Arif Zakaria
- Cinematography: Shakeel Khan
- Music by: Sunil Singh
- Release date: 5 March 2010 (India)
- Running time: 115 minutes
- Country: India
- Language: Hindi
- Budget: ₹5.25 crore
- Box office: ₹1.05 crore

Rokkk (transl. Stoppage) is a 2010 Indian Hindi-language supernatural horror film directed by Rajesh Ranshinge, starring Tanushree Dutta and Udita Goswami as sisters. The film was released on 5 March 2010, and became a box-office bomb.

== Plot ==
Anushka and Ahana are sisters; Anushka is married to an elderly man and widower named Ravi, who ties the knot with her after his first wife, Pooja's unknown and untimely death. Anushka's mother refuses to accept their marriage. The couple begin their journey in a new home purchased by Ravi 2 years ago. Anushka's life takes an unexpected twist. She tells this to her husband who thinks that she is only hallucinating and they decide to go back to their previous home, but the horror does not seem to stop in this house either. Anushka suspects that Pooja (Ravi's first wife) is behind all of these nerve-wracking incidents.

She seeks advice from a healer who tells her about the cursed house and that whoever will pass from the shadow of that house will be cursed and die a painful death. He gives her a Yantra which can only protect her and will not free her from the curse. When Ahana tries to discover the story behind the incidents her husband and sister-in-law get murdered; she is charged with the murders and taken to an asylum. She tries to reach her sister but she is unable to. By sensing a problem, Ahana starts a journey to reach her sister. In hotel where Ahana was staying she meets Ranvir a CBI officer who is in charge of this case.

Ranvir informs her about the charge levied on Anushka and her escape in asylum. Ranvir and Ahana together refuse to follow the same path but their destination is Anushka. Now they are cursed by the shadow of the house in the journey. As they move further they also meet the same healer who helps them to unfold the mysteries behind the house. The story continues with thrill and excitement. It slowly reveals the secret behind the cursed house.

== Cast ==
- Tanushree Dutta as Anushka
- Sachin Khedekar as Ravi
- Udita Goswami as Ahana Sharma
- Shaad Randhawa as Ranvir
- Nishigandha Wad as Mrs. Sharma (Anushka and Ahana’s mother)
- Vinod Kapoor
- Murli Sharma as Steve
- Arif Zakaria as Healer
- Ashwini Kalsekar as Yashoda Puri

== Release ==
The film was released in cinemas on 5 March 2010. It was later dubbed and released in Tamil as Antha Vettula Ennamo Nadakkuthu (transl. Something is happening in that house).

== Reception ==
A reviewer from Times of India gave the film 3 stars out of 5, labeling it desi Grudge which managed to bring out the chills, here and there. On the contrary, Taran Adarsh from Bollywood Hungama gave the film 2 stars out of 5, labeling the writing patchy, the effects tacky and the background score, reliant on the same sounds that one has come to expect from horror films. However, he praised the performances.
