= Woh Lamhe... =

2006 Indian film by Mohit Suri

- Poster
- Directed by: Mohit Suri
- Written by: Shagufta Rafique
- Story by: Mahesh Bhatt
- Produced by: Mahesh Bhatt; Mukesh Bhatt
- Starring: Kangana Ranaut; Shiney Ahuja; Shaad Randhawa; Purab Kohli
- Cinematography: Bobby Singh
- Edited by: Akiv Ali
- Music by: Songs: Pritam; Noah; Jawad Ahmed; Roop Kumar Rathod; Background Score: Raju Singh
- Production company: Vishesh Films
- Distributed by: Sony Films
- Release date: September 29, 2006
- Running time: 148 minutes
- Country: India
- Language: Hindi
- Box office: ₹14.98 crores

Woh Lamhe... (transl. Those Moments...) is a 2006 Indian Hindi-language romantic drama film directed by Mohit Suri and produced by Mahesh Bhatt and Mukesh Bhatt under Vishesh Films. It stars Kangana Ranaut and Shiney Ahuja. The film is supposedly based on Parveen Babi's life, her battle with schizophrenia and her relationship with Mahesh Bhatt to whom she was a lover as well as a mentor in his struggling days.

Bhatt said that it is his tribute to the actress and the time he spent with her, hence the name Woh Lamhe... ("Those Moments"). Parveen Babi's character is played by Ranaut who is named Sana Azim in the film to avoid a direct reference to the actress. The film was critically acclaimed for its screenplay, direction, and a noteworthy performance of Ranaut. Ranaut’s acting performance in the film, is considered one of her best.

Despite the film receiving praise, it could not recover its budget in the box office leading to it being considered a flop. However, the movie recovered most of its cost from DVD and satellite television revenue. For her performance in the film, Ranaut won the Filmfare Award for Best Female Debut at the 52nd Filmfare Awards.

== Plot ==
The film begins with a woman in a hotel room. She goes to the bathroom and slits her wrists in an attempt to kill herself. That woman is later revealed to be Sana Azim (Kangana Ranaut), a famous Bollywood actress. When this news reaches filmmaker Aditya Pankaj Garewal (Shiney Ahuja), he is devastated. Aditya has been searching for Sana, who was intensely involved with him and who had mysteriously disappeared from his life without any explanation three years ago, only to surface now in what could be the last moments of her life.

As Aditya waits outside the ICU alongside his friend Sam (Purab Kohli), praying to be reunited with her, he has a flashback of moments spent with her three years ago.

Sana had achieved stardom while Aditya was a struggling film director. He spots Sana at a fashion show, where he rebukes her for being ugly inside-out. He insults her to the point where she throws her underwear at him, thus garnering media attention. Nikhil (Shaad Randhawa), her abusive boyfriend, scolds her and rapes her. Sana's mother also scolds her for this act.

Sana agrees at first to work with Aditya for his film, but later she declines as she is bound by a contract. However, she breaks free from Nikhil's misery and agrees to work with Aditya.

Aditya starts shooting his film. During the shoot, both become close to each other. During the last day of the shoot, Sana tearfully says that she will miss him and the memories spent during the shoot. Aditya compares those memories to the sand castles on the beach by saying that those sand castles remain in our memories forever even though they are knocked down by the waves. During the film premiere, both fall in love with each other.

One day, Sana spots a girl forcefully entering her hotel room. She tells Aditya that a girl named Rani (Masumeh) entered the room. However, through the CCTV footage, there was no girl who entered. It later revealed that Sana is a patient with schizophrenia who has excessive hallucinations of Rani, who doesn't even exist, which gradually ruins both Sana's life and career. When Aditya realizes that the only way he can save Sana from total devastation is to take her away from Bollywood and the vested interests that threaten to destroy her completely, he kidnaps her from the hospital, thus putting his career on the line.

Aditya tries his best to bring Sana back on track, but in vain. She secretly stops taking her medication. During her birthday party, she faces her hallucinations once again and stabs Aditya.

One day, suddenly, she disappears, leaving him with unanswered questions. Aditya is shocked. Meanwhile, Nikhil and the police reach the place and take Aditya. Nikhil asks him in anger about Sana's whereabouts, to which Aditya repeatedly answers that he doesn't know.

Back in the present, Aditya is told that Sana has very little time and wants to meet him. They both profess their love for each other, and she breathes her last. Nikhil asks him what he will do next, to which Aditya replies that he doesn't know.

The film ends with Aditya reminiscing about her on a beach. He spots some children making sand castles and remembers his metaphor. He goes and makes castles with them.

== Cast ==
- Kangana Ranaut as Sana Azim (Based on Parveen Babi)
- Shiney Ahuja as Aditya Pankaj Garewal
- Shaad Randhawa as Nikhil Roy
- Masumeh as Rani Mukherjee
- Purab Kohli as Sam aka Sammy
- Chandrachur Singh as Shaan Awasthi

== Soundtrack ==
Woh Lamhe

Soundtrack album by Pritam Chakraborty, Noah, Jawad Ahmed and Roop Kumar Rathod
- Released: 17 August 2006
- Genre: Feature Film soundtrack
- Label: T-Series

The soundtrack was composed by Pritam while the score was composed by Raju Singh. The lyrics were written by Sayeed Quadri. Pritam was accused of plagiarism by copying the tunes "Kya Mujhe Pyaar Hai" which was allegedly lifted from "Tak Bisakah " by Noah, and "Tu Jo Nahin" from a ghazal by Pakistani singer S. B. John sung in 1959 Pakistani film - Savera; however, later the credits were given to the original artists and some of the tunes were recreated in musical arrangements. KK, Shreya Ghoshal, Jawad Ahmed, Kunal Ganjawala, and Glenn John lent their voices for the album. Planet Bollywood gave a rating of 8/10 to the soundtrack.

| Track No | Song | Singer | Composer |
|---|---|---|---|
| 1 | "Kya Mujhe Pyar Hai" | KK | Pritam |
| 2 | "Chal Chale Apne Ghar" | James | Pritam |
| 3 | "Tu Jo Nahin" I | Glenn John | Pritam |
| 4 | "So Jaoon Main" (Female) | Shreya Ghoshal | Roop Kumar Rathod |
| 5 | "Tu Jo Nahin" II | Glenn John | Pritam |
| 6 | "So Jaoon Main" (Male) | Kunal Ganjawala | Roop Kumar Rathod |
| 7 | "Bin Tere Kya Hai Jeena" | Jawad Ahmed | Jawad Ahmed (tune recreated by Pritam) |
| 8 | "Kya Mujhe Pyar Hai" (Qawwali) | KK | Pritam; Sabri Brothers |

== Reception ==
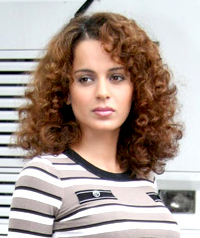
Ranaut's performance in Woh Lamhe... received praise from the film critics.

Subhash K. Jha of Sify stated, ‘‘Woh Lamhe shows love at its painful best’’. Praising Ranaut's performance he wrote, ‘‘Kangana makes the story of the tormented actress cross the borders of brilliancy; Ranaut keeps a tight control over overt articulations of expressions, so that when the outbursts happen they've a whiplash effect on the audience. She is a hugely expressive actress with a phemomenal ability to convey torment, hurt and incredulity through the eyes, Kangana is the first female performer of Bollywood since Smita Patil and Shabana Azmi who isn't scared to strip her soul naked for the camera’’. Taran Adarsh of Bollywood Hungama gave the film a rating of 3.5 (out of 5) and called it a ‘‘cinematic experience’’. He wrote, ‘‘Woh Lamhe is a well-made emotional film that lingers in your memory even after it's over’’. Praising Ranaut's performance he further wrote, ‘‘Kangana gets the role of a lifetime in her second film itself and the actor sinks her teeth into it and delivers an astounding performance. If you've ever interacted with Parveen Babi, even briefly, you'd see a replica of the glamorous star in Kangana’’. Gullu Singh of Rediff awarded the film 3.5 stars (out of 5) and wrote, ‘‘The film works because the protagonist, Sana (Kangana Ranaut) has acted so brilliantly that you feel the presence of Parveen Babi from the 1970s. If there is one reason you need to watch Woh Lamhe, it is Kangana Ranaut. She is a brilliant, outstanding actress’’.

Rajeev Masand in his review wrote, ‘‘Woh Lamhe is impressive in the manner in which it straddles a mainstream sensibility with such rare understanding; Remember to carry a handkerchief, or you’ll embarrass yourself with your tears’’. Praising the performances of the lead actors he further wrote, ‘‘Ranaut is remarkable as she attacks a complex role with all the right moves and Ahuja makes his presence felt in every single scene that he’s in, his performance is delectable to say the least. These actors pump life into their roles and together with Pritam’s soothing score they make Woh Lamhe an experience that’s hard to forget’’. Anupama Chopra of India Today wrote, ‘‘Woh Lamhe holds interest because it has a taut script and fine performances’’. Praising the performances of Ahuja and Ranaut she further wrote, ‘‘Ahuja is superbly restrained, his eyes convey the doom built into this relationship and Ranaut's performance has attitude; she is not afraid to be ugly or emotionally naked. Suri uses both ably to retell a familiar story persuasively’’. In a 2021 interview, film critic Baradwaj Rangan of Film Companion called Ranaut's performance in the film ‘‘excellent’’ and stated, ‘‘In Woh Lamhe, Ranaut takes a piece of her soul and gives it to the audience’’.

Filmfare listed Woh Lamhe... as one of the ten movies of Ranaut that showcased her class as an actor. They wrote, ‘‘Playing a schizophrenic, Kangana accurately depicted the trauma of the actress as her personal life went down the dumps along with her career’’. The New Indian Express listed the film as one of the ten must-watch films of Ranaut. Koimoi listed Woh Lamhe... as one of the ten film which will lose their charm without Ranaut's presence. CNN-IBN listed Ranaut's performance in Woh Lamhe... as one of her seven best performances and a film which made her the star that she is today.

== Awards ==
Filmfare Awards

- Filmfare Award for Best Female Debut – Kangana Ranaut

10th Zee Cine Awards

- Best Debut – Kangana Ranaut
