= Rozen-e-Deewar =

Studio album by Roxen
- Released: August 31, 2006
- Recorded: 2004–2006
- Studios: Xth Harmonic Studio, Lahore, Pakistan
- Genres: Pop rock, Alternative rock
- Language: Urdu
- Labels: Fire Records, Hom Records, Sangeet Records
- Producer: Zulfiqar Jabbar Khan

Professional ratings
Review scores
Source	Rating
Pakistani Music Channel	4.5/5 stars

Professional ratings
Review scores
Source	Rating
iTunes	5/5 stars

Rozen-e-Deewar is the first album recorded by Pakistani music band Roxen. Blending pop and rock, Roxen's debut album was released on August 31, 2006.

Rozen-e-Deewar was released under Fire Records (Pakistan), HOM Records (India), Sangeet Records (United States, Canada, North America, and across the world).

== Etymology ==
"Rozen-e-Deewar" is an Urdu word that means "A hole in a wall (of a prison cell) from which a ray of light emerges which gives hope and freshness". The name of the band is also a corruption of the same word (Roxen) and was suggested by Kashaan, a friend of Mustafa Zahid.

== Track listing ==
The album consists of ten songs.

No.	Title	Length
1.	"Sapnay"	4:15
2.	"Chaltay Rahay"	4:42
3.	"Tau Phir Aao"	5:48
4.	"Aaj"	3:26
5.	"Lams"	5:05
6.	"Rozen-e-Deewar"	4:12
7.	"Jag Chor Dia"	4:34
8.	"Yaadein"	4:35
9.	"Mujhko Satao"	4:10
10.	"Malangi"	5:20
Total length:		45:46

== Critical reception ==
Rozen-e-Deewar has received positive reviews and enabled the band to garner a cult following. Rizwana Malik of PakManzil called it worth the wait. Shahzeb Sheikh of Instep Magazine also gave a positive review and said, "Rozen-e-Deewar is a complete album in the sense that it caters to both rock freaks as well as listeners who like soft songs..."

== Awards and nominations ==
Rozen-e-Deewar was nominated for Best Album at the 7th Lux Style Awards.
