= Dr. Cabbie =

2014 film by Jean-François Pouliot

- Poster
- Directed by: Jean-François Pouliot
- Written by: Manu Chopra; Ron Kennell
- Story by: Vinay Virmani
- Produced by: Salman Khan; Pauline Dhillon; Ajay Virmani; André Rouleau
- Starring: Vinay Virmani; Kunal Nayyar; Adrianne Palicki
- Edited by: Dominique Fortin
- Music by: Yann Simhon; Igor Vrabac; Ken Worth
- Production companies: Seville Pictures; Eros International; Telefilm Canada; Salman Khan Films; First Take Entertainment; Caramel Films
- Distributed by: Eros International
- Release dates: September 14, 2014 (Cinefest Sudbury International Film Festival); September 19, 2014
- Running time: 98 minutes
- Countries: Canada; United States; India
- Languages: English; Hindi

Dr. Cabbie is a 2014 Canadian-Indian English-language romantic comedy film directed by Jean-François Pouliot and co-produced by Salman Khan. The film stars Kunal Nayyar, Vinay Virmani, and Adrianne Palicki. The story revolves around a newly arrived immigrant doctor in Canada who cannot get a job and is forced to become a taxi driver. He becomes a local hero when he converts his taxi into a mobile medical clinic. The film was released on DVD and Blu-ray from 23 December 2014.

== Plot ==
Deepak Veer Chopra is an Indian doctor who immigrates to Canada in the hope of starting a new life, but cannot find employment in medicine. He meets Tony, a taxi driver and becomes one himself. After delivering a baby in his taxi, he starts treating other passengers and practising medicine illegally, even though he has a medical degree and he is certified. He also falls in love with Natalie Wilman, the woman whose baby he delivered and she uses her training as a (non-practising) lawyer to help him achieve his dreams. Natalie names her son Ganesh at Deepak's suggestion. The baby's father is revealed to be Colin, a playboy who is running for election. Evidence found by the Canadian police leads to Deepak being arrested for illegal distribution of drugs. Natalie agrees to give him legal advice. At the trial, his patients defend Deepak furiously. He is found not guilty of the crimes he committed by acting as a taxi driver doctor, but is charged for possessing and distribution of drugs. Natalie, who has fallen in love with Deepak, asks him to marry her. He refuses, then immediately proposes saying that he wants to marry her on his terms. The authorities now take into account Deepak's family members (who in this case consist of a wife and baby), and clear him of all charges and got 500 hours community service prescribing medicine without a license to avoid jail time and deportation. After the trial concludes, Colin is standing near the exit and responsible for Deepak arrest, drunk, and teases Natalie about marrying Deepak. Deepak hits Colin; Natalie asks Colin if he is okay, and then hits him again. Deepak proposes having their honeymoon in India and Natalie agrees, saying that she would love to see the Taj Mahal with him. Two years later, they are still married and Natalie is pregnant with Deepak's baby. Deepak is a full-fledged licensed doctor in Toronto and working in the hospital. Natalie requests to Deepak that this time she prefers to have the baby in the hospital rather than in the taxi and may marry the taxi driver. Deepak shares as long as the taxi driver is a doctor!

== Cast ==
- Vinay Virmani as Dr. Deepak Veer Chopra
- Adrianne Palicki as Natalie Wilman
- Kunal Nayyar as Tony
- Lillete Dubey as Nellie
- Mircea Monroe as Rani
- Chris Diamantopoulos as Colin Hill
- Rizwan Manji as Vijay Sharma
- Stephen McHattie as Pete
- Judah Katz as James Whilcher
- Isabel Kaif as Simone

In addition, special credits are given for appearances by Lilly Singh as Lily, Tia Bhatia as Zarah and onscreen singers and musicians Kardinal Offishall, DJ Mocha, Manj Musik (credited by his birth name, Manjeet Ral) and Selena Dhillon as themselves.

== Reception ==
=== Box office ===
In the US, the film earned only $225,490.

== Soundtrack ==
Track listing
No.	Title	Artist(s)	Length
1.	"Dal Makhani"	Manj Musik & Raftaar	3:43
2.	"All I Need Is You"	Raghav & Selena Dhillon	3:45
3.	"Maula Mere"	Mustafa Zahid	4:34
4.	"All I Need Is You (Hindi)"	Raghav	2:43
5.	"Dr Cabbie"	Deesha Sarai	3:20
6.	"Don't Be Shy"	Selena Dhillon & Jus Reign	3:22
7.	"Dal Makhani (Punjabi Remix)"	Manak-E	3:34
8.	"Don't Be Shy"	Selena Dhillon	2:47
