= Ek Villain Returns =

2022 Indian film by Mohit Suri

- Theatrical release poster
- Directed by: Mohit Suri
- Written by: Mohit Suri; Aseem Arrora; Kanika Dhillon
- Story by: Mohit Suri
- Produced by: Shobha Kapoor; Ekta Kapoor; Bhushan Kumar; Krishan Kumar
- Starring: John Abraham; Arjun Kapoor; Disha Patani; Tara Sutaria
- Cinematography: Vikas Sivaraman
- Edited by: Devendera Murdeshwar
- Music by: Score: Raju Singh; Songs: Ankit Tiwari; Tanishk Bagchi; Kaushik-Guddu
- Production companies: T-Series; Balaji Motion Pictures
- Distributed by: AA Films
- Release date: 29 July 2022
- Running time: 128 minutes
- Country: India
- Language: Hindi
- Budget: ₹62–₹80 crore
- Box office: est. ₹68.64 crore

Ek Villain Returns (transl. A Villain Returns) is a 2022 Indian Hindi-language psychological action thriller film directed by Mohit Suri and produced by T-Series and Balaji Motion Pictures. The film, a sequel to the 2014 film Ek Villain, stars John Abraham, Arjun Kapoor, Disha Patani and Tara Sutaria. The soundtrack was composed by Ankit Tiwari, Tanishk Bagchi and Kaushik-Guddu, while the musical score was composed by Raju Singh. The cinematography and editing were handled by Vikas Sivaraman and Devendera Murdeshwar respectively. The film follows a singer's murder that leads to a twisted investigation involving a wronged lover, a schizophrenic killer, and buried secrets resurfacing.

Ek Villain Returns was released theatrically on 29 July 2022 to mixed reviews from critics and was a box office bomb.

== Plot ==
A masked intruder barges into an apartment complex, where he attacks and kills a singer named Aarvi Malhotra. The cops, headed by ex-CBI officer and DCP Aditya Rathore, deduce that the attack was orchestrated by Gautam Mehra, who is the son of businessman Divesh Mehra, but his teammate, ACP V.K. Ganesan, a criminal psychology expert who has previously studied Aditya's last big case involving psychopath Rakesh Mahadkar, refuses to believe the matter is this simple, as the story goes into a flashback with an introduction to Gautam.

Past: Gautam is a rich spoilt brat, who is berated by Divesh for having created a commotion at his ex-girlfriend Siya's wedding. The commotion video has been made into a rap song by singer Aarvi. Gautam is ousted from the business and his house. Pretending to be in love with her, Gautam helps Aarvi scare away her rival Q/Kiran. Aarvi falls for Gautam and reveals that her biological father Balkrishnan Shastri, a popular singer, had an extramarital affair with her mother, but never accepted either of them. Her main goal is to make her father accept her as his daughter by becoming a famous singer and later reject him. Gautam leaks Aarvi's childhood photos, implying that he was out to get even with her for humiliating him. Shastri publicly rejects his daughter, where Aarvi gets heartbroken. Three months later, Gautam gets attacked by Siya's husband Aditya and Aarvi takes care of him, where he realizes his love for her. Gautam pleads with her to give him a second chance, but Aarvi leaves him with a heavy heart.

Present: Gautam gets arrested, but manages to escape from the cops. Ganesan surmises that Gautam hasn't killed Aarvi. The cops interrogate Bhairav Purohit, whom Aarvi had called on the day she was murdered, but he denies committing the crime and there is no evidence either. Ganesan determines a pattern that the killer only targets young girls with one-sided lovers after discovering that 18 girls have been murdered with a similar modus operandi in the past 6 months. The ensuing circumstances motivate Ganesan to conclude that Gautam is not the serial killer, where it is later revealed that the serial killer is actually Bhairav; Gautam fights him but is unable to see his face, which allows Bhairav to escape.

Past: Bhairav is a cab driver who works part-time as a zookeeper along with his widower friend Keshav, who has a son Yash, but ignores him for random girls which he brings to the zoo. Bhairav meets Rasika Mapuskar, a retail salesgirl at a mall, falls deeply in love with her and harbors plans for marriage. One day, Rasika injures a group of rogues that were eve-teasing her, which reveals her dark side to Bhairav. Bhairav decides to propose to Rasika, but he witnesses her getting intimate with her married manager Atul and gets heartbroken. Rasika subsequently instigates him to kill girls who don't reciprocate the feelings of their respective boyfriends. Bhairav is mentally tormented and starts murdering dozens of girls. On the day Aarvi leaves Gautam, she turns out to be traveling in Bhairav's cab, where Bhairav misunderstands that she has dumped Gautam and attacks her.

Present: Gautam learns about Bhairav's zoo address and leaves to confront him. Ganesan is killed by Bhairav, who reveals that Aarvi is alive. Aarvi tries to escape the zoo where she had been kept by Bhairav, but he catches her and locks her in an underground cage. Just as Gautam and Bhairav are about to fight, the police come and detain Bhairav. They interrogate Yash, who frames Keshav in an attempt to defend Bhairav. The police also investigate the crime scene, where a girl's dead body is found inside the freezer, though it is not Aarvi. Outside the station, Gautam sees Bhairav and Rasika hugging.

Later that evening, Bhairav and Rasika return to the zoo and attend to Aarvi's cage, where Aarvi regains consciousness and stabs Bhairav with a glass shard that she found there. Rasika bursts into laughter while Bhairav attacks Aarvi. Gautam arrives to save her and a fight ensues between the guys. Bhairav hits Gautam and demands Rasika's reaction, but Gautam begins laughing and asks where "Rasika" is. It is revealed that Bhairav actually has schizophrenia and was hallucinating Rasika all along. Bhairav then reminisces that Rasika told him how Atul was planning to ditch his family for her. Bhairav inadvertently killed Rasika by breaking her back while begging her not to leave him. The body, which the cops found in the freezer, is revealed to be Rasika which Bhairav kept for himself. Realizing his mistake, Bhairav walks inside the cage of the tiger only to meet the same fate as his victims. Aarvi reunites with Gautam and is seen singing at her concert with the support of her fans and Gautam.

During a mid-credits scene, at a mental asylum, Rakesh, who has survived the accident and became paraplegic meets Bhairav, who has severe wounds on his body due to the tiger attack. Rakesh recites his promise from the prequel as Bhairav wakes up just before the screen cuts to black.

== Cast ==
- John Abraham as Bhairav Purohit
- Arjun Kapoor as Gautam Mehra
- Disha Patani as Rasika Mapuskar
- Tara Sutaria as Aarvi Malhotra
- J. D. Chakravarthy as ACP V. K. Ganesan
- Karishma Sharma as Siya, Gautam's ex-girlfriend
- Kaizaad Kotwal as Siya's Father
- Aditya Roy Kapur as Police Informer (Cameo)
- Shaad Randhawa as ex-CBI officer DCP Aditya Rathore
- Prasad Jawade as Ashu Bhoire
- Bharat Dabholkar as Divesh Mehra, Gautam's father
- Ivan Rodrigues as Thapar
- Digvijay Rohildas as Keshav Rane, Bhairav's friend
- Neha Shitole as Chetna
- Satish Nakyodi as Satish
- Riteish Deshmukh as Rakesh Mahadkar (archive footage and cameo in mid-credits scene)
- Badshah as himself in a cameo appearance in the song "Shaamat"

== Production ==
=== Casting ===
Aditya Roy Kapur was originally signed for the role portrayed by Arjun Kapoor, but later backed out due to creative differences with director Mohit Suri. Then, Kartik Aaryan was approached but he could not accept the offer due to date clashes with his Dhamaka.

=== Filming ===
Principal photography began on 1 March 2021. Abraham finished shooting in October 2021. The entire film was wrapped up on 24 March 2022.

== Soundtrack ==
Ek Villain Returns

Soundtrack album by Ankit Tiwari, Tanishk Bagchi and Kaushik-Guddu
- Released: 30 June 2022
- Recorded: 2021–2022
- Genre: Feature film soundtrack
- Length: 33:28
- Language: Hindi
- Label: T-Series
- Producer: Bhushan Kumar

The songs are composed by Ankit Tiwari, Tanishk Bagchi, and Kaushik-Guddu. The lyrics are written by Manoj Muntashir, Kunaal Vermaa, Tanishk Bagchi and Prince Dubey. The film score is composed by Raju Singh.

The first song "Galliyan Returns" was recreated from the track Galliyan for the 2014 film Ek Villain which was sung by Ankit Tiwari and written by Manoj Muntashir. The second single named "Dil" was released on 8 July 2022. The third single titled "Shaamat" was released on 16 July 2022 with Tara Sutaria making her singing debut. The fourth single titled "Naa Tere Bin" was released on 22 July 2022.

Track listing
No.	Title	Lyrics	Music	Singer(s)	Length
1.	"Galliyan Returns"	Manoj Muntashir	Ankit Tiwari	Ankit Tiwari	5:50
2.	"Dil"	Kunaal Vermaa	Kaushik-Guddu	Raghav Chaitanya	5:09
3.	"Shaamat"	Prince Dubey	Ankit Tiwari	Ankit Tiwari, Tara Sutaria	5:34
4.	"Naa Tere Bin"	Tanishk Bagchi	Tanishk Bagchi	Altamash Faridi	6:11
5.	"Dil" (Shreya's Version)	Kunaal Vermaa	Kaushik-Guddu	Shreya Ghoshal	5:10
6.	"Shaamat" (Ankit Tiwari's Version)	Prince Dubey	Ankit Tiwari	Ankit Tiwari	5:34
Total length:					33:28

== Reception ==
=== Box office ===
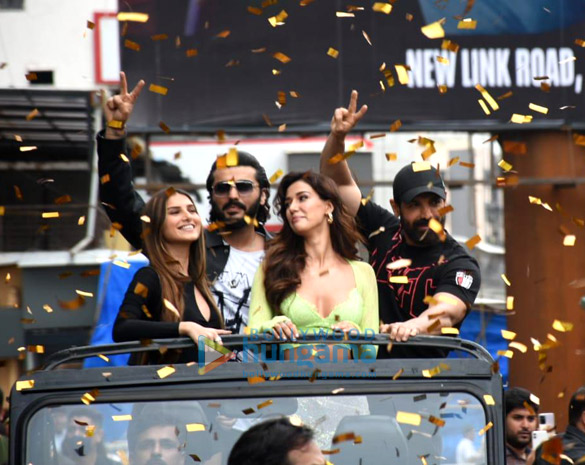
Kapoor, Abraham, Patani and Sutaria at a promotional event for the film

Ek Villain Returns earned ₹7.05 crores at the domestic box office on its opening day. On the second day, the film collected ₹7.47 crore. On the third day, the film collected ₹9.02 crore, taking a total domestic weekend collection to ₹23.54 crore.

As of 18 August 2022, the film grossed ₹49.63 crore (US$5.2 million) in India and ₹19.01 crore (US$2.0 million) overseas, for a worldwide gross collection of ₹68.64 crore (US$7.1 million) .

=== Critical response ===
On the review aggregator website Rotten Tomatoes, 0% of 6 critics' reviews are positive, with an average rating of 1.7/10.

Ek Villain Returns received mixed reviews from critics. A critic for Bollywood Hungama rated the film 4 out of 5 stars and wrote "EK VILLAIN RETURNS is the epitome of supreme music, amazing visuals and thrilling moments". Shweta Keshri of India Today rated the film 3 out of 5 stars and wrote "The gripping plot of Ek Villain Returns is the winner with an engaging storyline. Mohit Suri, who did a good job with the first film of the Ek Villain franchise, brings a masala entertainer with massy dialogues, thrilling moments and good performances in the sequel". Rohit Bhatnagar of The Free Press Journal rated the film 3 out of 5 stars and wrote "Ek Villain Returns has surely returned but not with the vibe of the earlier one. Enjoy this film to experience a stylish thriller that copes well with the mass appeal".

== Release ==
=== Theatrical ===
The film was released in theatres worldwide on 29 July 2022.

=== Home media ===
The digital streaming rights of the film was sold to Netflix. The film started streaming digitally on Netflix from 9 September 2022.
