= Amit Ray =

Indian author

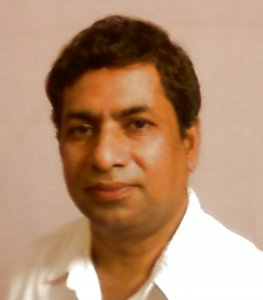
- Born: 12 August 1960 (age 66); India
- Education: University of Calcutta; Indian Institute of Technology, Kharagpur; Indian Institute of Engineering Science and Technology, Shibpur
- Occupations: Author, spiritual master
- Spouse: Banani Ray

Amit Ray (born 12 August 1960) is an Indian author and "spiritual master". He is known for his teachings on meditation, yoga, peace and compassion. He is best known for his 114 chakra system, Om meditation, and integrated yoga and vipassana meditation techniques. He is author of several books on meditation and other spiritual topics. He was one of the pioneers in proposing compassionate artificial intelligence.

== Early life and education ==
Amit Ray was born on 12 August 1960. He earned a B.E. in engineering at Bengal Engineering College, Shibpur, then affiliated with the University of Calcutta. Ray completed his M.Tech and PhD in 1993 from Indian Institute of Technology Kharagpur.

== Career ==
=== Teachings ===
He teaches a 114 Chakra system, the importance of integrating yoga, mindfulness and positive approach towards life. He emphasizes the value of family. He underlines the value of beautification of inner dialog and the inner world with love light and compassion to make life beautiful.

=== Compassionate AI ===
He is one of the pioneers of compassionate artificial intelligence movement. He introduced the concept of Deep Compassion algorithms and frameworks to solve humanitarian needs such as compassionate care-giving, helping physically and mentally challenged people. Ray argues the importance of compassion, kindness and emotional intelligence in the age of automation, AI and social robots. He said "As more and more artificial intelligence is entering into the world, more and more emotional intelligence must enter into leadership." Ray has used the term "compassionate social robot", which he defined as an autonomous physical agent that interacts with humans in social context like a human, on all fronts of emotions, intelligence, compassion and creativity.

=== Peace and humanitarian work ===
He believes greater collaboration among international organisations is essential. He said, collaboration is the essence of life as the wind, bees and flowers work together, to spread the pollen. Ray advocates planting more trees, to give our children and the future generation a cleaner and safe environment. He stated that we may not plant millions of trees, but we can take care of one single tree with love and care that will make us great. Ray is the founding president of IISCIM, which is dedicated to remove the sufferings of humanity through yoga, meditation, Ayurveda, pollution-free environment, scientific research, and social welfare.

== Books ==
- Om Chanting and Meditation
- OM Sutra: The Pathway to Enlightenment
- Yoga and Vipassana: An Integrated Lifestyle
- Awakening Inner Guru: The Path of Realizing the God Within
- World Peace: The Voice of a Mountain Bird
- Meditation: Insights and Inspirations
- Compassionate Artificial Intelligence: Frameworks and Algorithms
- The Science of 114 Chakras in Human Body
