= Galliyan =

2014 Hindi song

- Cover of the song, featuring actors Sidharth Malhotra and Shraddha Kapoor

Single by Ankit Tiwari

from the album Ek Villain
- Released: 9 May 2014
- Recorded: Suburban Studio in Mumbai
- Genre: Filmi . Acoustic pop . R&B
- Length: 5:40
- Label: T-Series
- Composer: Ankit Tiwari
- Lyricist: Manoj Muntashir
- Producer: Ekta Kapoor

Galliyan (transl. Lanes/Streets) is a romantic Hindi song from the Hindi film, Ek Villain. Composed by Ankit Tiwari, the song is sung by Tiwari himself, with lyrics penned by Manoj Muntashir. The music video of the track features actors Sidharth Malhotra and Shraddha Kapoor. A revised version of the song is created for its spiritual sequel for the 2022 film, Ek Villain Returns titled "Galliyan Returns". The music video of the track is picturised on lead couples John Abraham and Disha Patani also Arjun Kapoor and Tara Sutaria. Ankit Tiwari again sang and composed for the revised version and lyrics was written by Manoj Muntashir.

== Background ==
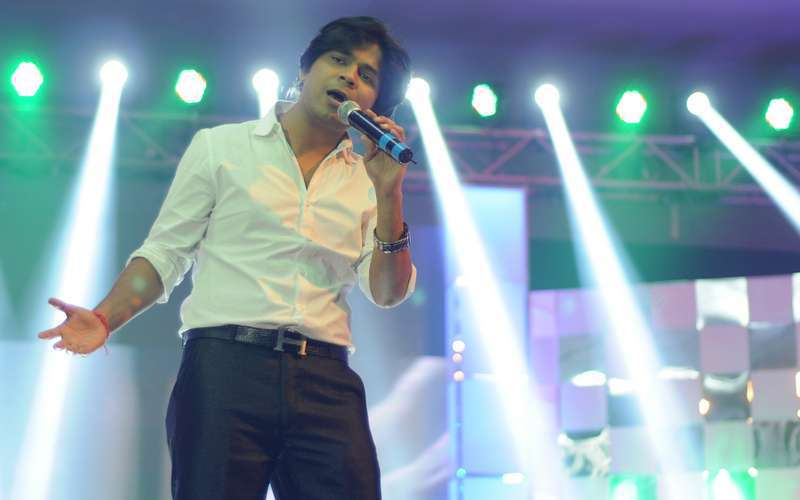
The song is composed and sung by Ankit Tiwari

Mohit Suri outlined a situation to Ankit Tiwari stating about the picturisation they had been planning, including the butterflies and the underwater shot. Suri told Tiwari that song does not have an element of sadness. During an 'evening stroll' Tiwari was thinking about it, when the introductory verse penned by Manoj Muntashir 'floated' into his mind, which he stated "The words are simple, direct and straight from the heart, the thoughts so pure. I found myself humming the verse as I walked around my building's compound. For me the toughest part is composing the mukhda and the punchline. Once that's done, the antaras flow. By the time I went up to my apartment, I had the song playing in my mind".

Back home, Tiwari 'fine-tuned' the composition and arranged it on his keyboard. The next day, he sent it across to Suri, which he liked instantly. On recording the composition, Tiwari was selected to playback for the song. Tiwari stated that the emotion expressed in the song is young, immature love, and felt it easy to express as everyone has gone through that phase. Though he found it difficult to compose since it is a 'soothing song in a film which was the love story of a villain'. The song was recorded in February 2014.

In composition of the song, it starts off on an unplugged note but gets dominated by electric guitar with some soft orchestra. The song shifts gears towards the latter part where the flute and violin are used. The song mostly shows beautiful landscapes and focuses on the scenic beauty. While shooting the track, Sidharth Malhotra and Shraddha Kapoor had to camp on the top of a hill for hours to capture a shot with a moodypeacock, which took long to open its wings.

Picturization for the song was proceeded a month after the recording of the song. The song was shot in Goa and Mauritius. The underwater shot of the song was completed in seven hours. The production team sent French divers to carry oxygen cylinders for Kapoor and Malhotra. Both Kapoor and Malhotra took special training in Scuba diving from Anees Adenwala, who was their chief scuba diving instructor. The song was choreographed by Raju Singh. Talking about the picturisation of the song, Suri stated "The song is about everything a man would do for a woman whom he's hopelessly in love with. He fulfills all her wishes – dancing with butterflies, holding stars in her palms, going underwater, touching the first snow and more". The song has a sequence of snowfall which was actually shot at a bungalow on the outskirts of Mumbai, on one of the hottest days of the schedule. In the video, Kapoor is seen riding a Royal Enfield.

== Release and response ==
The first look of the song was revealed on 5 May 2014. A teaser of the song was released on 7 May 2014. The music video of the song was officially released on 8 May 2014, through the YouTube channel of T-Series. Full audio of the song was released the following day as a single.

The video of the song received over a half million views within 2 days of release, and crossed one million hits on YouTube in the next day. The song topped the list of "Bollywood music report Jan–Sept 2014" presented by The Times of India. The song was included in the list of "The Top 10 Most Popular Songs of 2014" which was announced in the report of "Hungama.com Chart-toppers 2014". According to Bollywood Life's "Chartbusters of 2014", the song "Galliyan" is placed at the second position after "Baby Doll" from Ragini MMS 2. The song also made its entry at position 4 in the "Top 10 songs of 2014" published by The Indian Express.

== Critical reception ==
Mohar Basu from Koimoi described the song as 'the most attractive song of the album' stating "Ankit Tiwari's music and voice adds the required finesse in this song and what he has made darn great!". Joginder Toteja reviewing for Rediff.com complimented the work by Tiwari for bringing a 'good twist to Muntashir's lyrics' and felt the song is 'the anthem of the season'.

Rajiv Vijayakar from Bollywood Hungama praised Muntashir's 'heart-to-heart lyrics' though criticed Tiwari's singing commenting "Ankit's vocals tend to be too harsh for a song in such a placid mood".

== Unplugged Version ==
An unplugged version of the song was included in the soundtrack, composed and written by Ankit Tiwari and Manoj Muntashir respectively. The song is sung by the actress of the film Shraddha Kapoor alongside Tiwari. The song was released along with other tracks in the soundtrack of the album on 28 May 2014. This version of the song was included in the official trailer of the film.

The song topped iTunes Motswana Chart and iTunes Omani Chart and was ranked 2 at peak position in iTunes Indian Chart. The song was appreciated by many of her contemporaries and others in the industry.

=== Background ===
Mohit Suri wanted to incorporate an unplugged version of the same song towards the end of the film. He wanted to have an innocent voice which will be used as a background and the scenes in the foreground will be violent. Then he suggested Kapoor's name to render the version who was shooting in Pune. Tiwari had heard her humming on the sets of Aashiqui 2. Talking about the recording Kapoor stated "Having never done playback before, I was nervous. But it went pretty smooth". In an interview Tiwari commented "We called Shraddha with the intent of trying out her voice. If it hadn't worked we would have re-recorded her voice. But when she sang 'Galliyan', I immediately knew she owned it. There was a purity in her voice".

Suri insisted Tiwari to sing the second antara in the version along with Kapoor. The unplugged version took three hours to be completed. The unplugged version was recorded at a suburban studio in Mumbai. The song dominantly uses, acoustic guitar alongside piano in composition in the starting verses but changes to use of soft drum beats and violin during the part where Tiwari joins the microphone.

=== Critical reception ===
Rajiv Vijayakar from Bollywood Hungama picked the unplugged version over the original and stated "Kapoor is a revelation in both, her vocal texture and expressiveness, never mind the technical processing a singer's voice gets today". Mohar Basu from Koimoi praised Tiwari for bringing out the best from Kapoor and stated "Kapoor's voice has more depth than perfection, and probable it is she who makes it sound so volatile". Joginder Toteja reviewing for Rediff.com in praise for Kapoor's rendition stated "Her voice sounds as polished as that of a professional singer and she makes sure to add an edge to Teri Galliyan".

== Track listing and formats ==
- Digital single
1. "Galliyan" – 5:40
- Original Motion Picture Soundtrack
1. "Galliyan" – 5:40
2. "Galliyan" (Unplugged) – 4:14
- Remix Single
1. "Galliyan" (Remix) – 3:28
2. "You and Me / Teri Galliyan" Official International Remake from T-Series (By Vaibhav Saxena) – 3:15
- Cover Version Single
1. "You and Me (Teri Galliyan)" Official International Remake from T-Series (By Vaibhav Saxena) – 3:15
2. "Galliyan" (Cover by Natalie Di Luccio) – 2:50
3. "Galliyan" (English Version by Ariyah & DJ AKS) – 3:17

== Recreation ==
The song was recreated for the spiritual sequel 2022 film Ek Villain Returns titled "Galliyan Returns" by Tiwari who also sang the song and lyrics was written by Manoj Muntashir. The lyrics is completely different only retaining the hook line. The song features the lead characters John Abraham, Disha Patani, Arjun Kapoor and Tara Sutaria. The film is directed by Mohit Suri who also directed the prequel.

== By Popular Culture ==
- The song was mentioned in 2016 film Kyaa Kool Hain Hum 3 also produced by Ekta Kapoor and Shobha Kapoor who produced Ek Villain.
- In 2019 film Marjaavaan which also features Siddharth Malhotra as lead role and Ritesh Deshmukh as main antagonist, the song was hummed by Ritesh.

== Accolades ==
| Year | Award | Category | Nominee | Result | Ref |
|---|---|---|---|---|---|
| 2014 | Stardust Awards | Best Male Playback Singer | Ankit Tiwari | Won | |
| 2014 | Stardust Awards | Best Music Director (along with Mithoon) | Ankit Tiwari | Nominated | |
| 2014 | BIG Star Entertainment Awards | Most Entertaining Singer (Male) | Ankit Tiwari | Won | |
| 2014 | BIG Star Entertainment Awards | Most Entertaining Song | Ankit Tiwari | Nominated | |
| 2015 | 10th Renault Star Guild Awards | Best Male Playback Singer | Ankit Tiwari | Won | |
| 2015 | 10th Renault Star Guild Awards | Best Music | Ankit Tiwari | Won | |
| 2015 | 10th Renault Star Guild Awards | Best Lyricist | Manoj Muntashir | Won | |
| 2015 | 21st Annual Life OK Screen Awards | Best Male Playback Singer | Ankit Tiwari | Nominated | |
| 2015 | 21st Annual Life OK Screen Awards | Best Music Director (along with Mithoon) | Ankit Tiwari | Won | |
| 2015 | 60th Filmfare Awards | Best Male Playback Singer | Ankit Tiwari | Won | |
| 2015 | Global Indian Music Academy Awards | Best Film Song | Ankit Tiwari | Won | |
| 2015 | Global Indian Music Academy Awards | Best Male Playback Singer | Ankit Tiwari | Nominated | |
| 2015 | Global Indian Music Academy Awards | Best Lyricist | Manoj Muntashir | Nominated | |
| 2015 | Global Indian Music Academy Awards | Best Music Debut | Shraddha Kapoor (as singer) | Nominated | |
| 2015 | 7th Mirchi Music Awards | Song of the Year | Ankit Tiwari | Nominated | |
| 2015 | 7th Mirchi Music Awards | Male Vocalist of the Year | Ankit Tiwari | Nominated | |
| 2015 | 7th Mirchi Music Awards | Music Composer of the Year | Ankit Tiwari | Nominated | |
| 2015 | 7th Mirchi Music Awards | Lyricist of the Year | Manoj Muntashir | Nominated | |
| 2015 | 7th Mirchi Music Awards | Upcoming Female Vocalist of the Year | Shraddha Kapoor | Nominated | |
