= Ek Villain =

2014 Indian film by Mohit Suri

EK Villain
- Theatrical release poster
- Directed by: Mohit Suri
- Written by: Tushar Hiranandani
- Dialogues by: Milap Zaveri
- Produced by: Ekta Kapoor; Shobha Kapoor
- Starring: Riteish Deshmukh; Sidharth Malhotra; Shraddha Kapoor; Shaad Randhawa
- Cinematography: Vishnu Rao
- Edited by: Devendra Murdeshwar
- Music by: Songs: Ankit Tiwari; Mithoon; Soch - The Band; Score: Raju Singh
- Production company: Balaji Motion Pictures
- Distributed by: AA Films
- Release date: 27 June 2014; (India)
- Running time: 129 minutes
- Country: India
- Language: Hindi
- Budget: ₹39 crore
- Box office: est. ₹169.62 crore

Ek Villain: There's One in Every Love Story (transl. A Villain) is a 2014 Indian Hindi-language romantic psychological action thriller film directed by Mohit Suri and jointly produced by Shobha Kapoor and Ekta Kapoor under Balaji Motion Pictures. Based on a script written by Tushar Hiranandani and Milap Zaveri, and reported to be loosely inspired by the 2010 South Korean action-thriller film I Saw the Devil, it stars Riteish Deshmukh, Sidharth Malhotra and Shraddha Kapoor in lead roles. The narrative follows a reformed criminal who is once again set on a warpath when his wife dies at the hands of a serial killer, all the while grappling with his disturbing past and reminiscing his romantic journey with his wife.

Ek Villain was released worldwide on 27 June 2014 and received positive reviews from critics, garnering praise for its theme, direction, screenwriting and action sequences with Deshmukh receiving particular praise in his first ever negative role. Made on a budget of ₹39 crore, the film was a major box-office success with earnings of over ₹100 crore domestically and a worldwide gross of ₹170 crore, becoming Malhotra's highest-grossing release. The songs "Galliyan", "Zaroorat" and "Hamdard" became huge hits.

Malhotra and Deshmukh later reunited for the 2019 masala actioner Marjaavaan, in which Deshmukh's entry as the antagonist was accompanied by him singing the award-winning song "Galliyan" from the Ek Villain soundtrack. A sequel titled Ek Villain Returns, starring John Abraham and Arjun Kapoor, along with Disha Patani and Tara Sutaria, was released in July 2022; Deshmukh reprises his role in the sequel both as part of archive footage and for a mid-credits appearance.

== Plot ==
A young woman, Aisha Verma, tries to leave a message for her husband, Guru Divekar, when a masked man who has entered her house kills her by defenestration. At her funeral, CBI officer Aditya Rathore points out that it is vital to track down the murderer or else Guru will go on a killing spree.

Past: Guru was a ruthless hitman working for mob boss Caesar, who raised and trained him to murder the goons who killed his parents. When Guru is arrested for killing Debu, Debu's mother refuses to testify against him and warns him that one day God will make him pay for his crimes by making him lose his loved one. Guru soon falls in love with Aisha, an optimistic girl dying from a terminal illness, and they get married. Guru gives up his old life and gets a job while Aisha receives treatment in Mumbai and recovers. She discovers she is pregnant and decides to tell Guru in person when he returns from his interview, but is murdered before she could.

Present: Rakesh Mahadkar is an unsuccessful man who is constantly insulted and ridiculed by his wife, Sulochana "Sulu" Mahadkar, for his shortcomings. While he dearly loves his wife, he vents his frustration by murdering other women who speak rudely to him, and Aisha turns out to be one of them. Guru hunts down Rakesh and brutally beats angrily him up, then admits him to a hospital and pays for the expenses, intending to punish him by repeatedly bringing him to the brink of death, saving him, and doing it all over again.

At the hospital, when Guru learns that Aisha was pregnant, he is devastated. While assaulting a nurse, Rakesh is again interrupted by Guru. Rakesh realizes that Guru is Aisha's husband and is seeking vengeance. Upon the suggestion of his friend Brijesh, he taunts Guru over the phone and then kills Aisha's father. Rakesh expects Guru to kill angered him so that he can die as a hero in the eyes of Sulochana and everyone else, while Guru will be tarnished.

However, Caesar calls Guru and says that he has killed Sulochana to avenge Aisha for Guru and left Rakesh's little son Manish for Guru to kill. Enraged, Rakesh stabs Guru with a screwdriver and takes up a boulder to kill him, but is hit by a car and it seems that he dies from his injuries. (Note: A mid-credits scene in the sequel Ek Villain Returns reveals he survived the accident but has since been paralyzed from the waist down and uses a wheelchair.) Guru adopts Manish and completes the wishes on Aisha's bucket list.

== Cast ==
- Riteish Deshmukh as Rakesh Mahadkar: an electrician; a serial killer
- Siddharth Malhotra as Guru Divakar: a hitman
- Shraddha Kapoor as Aisha Divakar/Verma: Guru's wife; Aadesh's daughter
- Aamna Sharif as Sulochana "Sulu" Mahadkar: Rakesh's wife; Manish's mother
- Remo Fernandes as Caesar
- Shaad Randhawa as ACP Aditya Rathore
- Asif Basra as Aadesh Verma: Aisha's father
- Rishina Kandhari as Jia Shinde
- Prachi Desai as Herself in the song "Awari" (special appearance)
- Kamaal R. Khan as Brijesh Yadav: Rakesh's friend (special appearance)
- Al Mamun Al Siyam as Aisha's friend
- Vidyadhar Karmakar as Chotu
- Rumana Molla as Nidhi Sharma
- Nihar Gite as Manish Mahadkar: Rakesh & Sulu's son
- Praveena Deshpande as Dipu's Mother
- Vikas Shrivastav as Wagle

== Production ==
=== Development ===
Ekta Kapoor signed Mohit Suri to direct a romantic thriller. Ek Villain had been reported to be a remake of the Korean film I Saw the Devil, though Suri refuted the claim.

Suri has stated that every character in the film comes with grey shades.

== Marketing ==
The Central Board of Film Certification (CBFC) cleared the film with a U/A certificate after a total of eight cuts designed to tone down the action sequences and mute a particular word. Tanuj Garg, representative of Balaji Motion Pictures stated the cuts were less than a minute of screen time.

The movie's official teaser which was released on 4 April 2014 with the film Main Tera Hero, got 1 million views on YouTube within three days of release. The official trailer of 2 minutes 18 secs was launched later and was well received by critics, as well as garnered praise from around the industry, including Karan Johar, Ranbir Kapoor, Katrina Kaif among others.

Sidharth Malhotra, Shraddha Kapoor, Riteish Deshmukh, Mohit Suri and the film's music directors attended a musical event in Mumbai to promote the soundtrack of the film. Further, Malhotra and Kapoor promoted the movie at the IPL semi-finals as well as on reality shows like Jhalak Dikhhla Jaa. Promotion campaigns were also organized across the country in cities like Jaipur, Kolkata and Delhi. As a part of the promotional strategy, a television show based on Bollywood villains was hosted by Malhotra.

== Soundtrack ==
The songs are composed by Mithoon, Ankit Tiwari and the band Soch. The lyrics are written by Manoj Muntashir, Mithoon and members of Soch. The album consists of six songs with Tiwari composing "Galliyan", Mithoon composing "Zaroorat", "Humdard," and "Banjaara" while the remaining track "Awari" is composed by Soch.

The film score was composed by Raju Singh.

== Release ==
Ek Villain was released theatrically on 27 June 2014, in 2539 screens in the domestic market.

=== Critical reception ===
Ek Villain received positive reviews from critics with praise for the performances of Deshmukh in particular.

Taran Adarsh of Bollywood Hungama awarded the movie 4/5 stars and wrote that, "On the whole, Ek Villain is a stylish, spellbinding and terrifying edge-of-the-seat thriller. It's a step forward in this genre, without a doubt. A sure-shot winner!" Raedita Tandon from Filmfare gave the film 4/5 stars and stated that, "Though indulgent in parts, Ek Villain packs in a punch. Copy of a Korean film or not, it's 'good' paisa vasool entertainment." Meena Iyer of The Times of India gave the film 3 stars in a scale of 5, stating that "You cannot fault the scale of Ek Villain or berate its lead star cast. But you wish you could celebrate this thriller like you did Suri's last movie outing Aashiqui 2. This one lacks soul."

Aparna Mudi of Zee News gave the film a rating of 2.5/5 stars, concluding her review that "The unveiling of the visceral saga has a lot of strong characters and Mohit has done a good job in adapting a foreign film and complementing it with the drama that the Indian audience is used to. But he has gone a tad over in making a thriller. Maybe, filmmakers should step out of this trap more often and we wouldn`t be too far from making beacons of world cinema." Rajeev Masand of CNN-IBN stated that "I'm going with two-and-a-half out of five for 'Ek Villain'. If you're still wondering, the real villain here is the lousy script".

Shubhra Gupta of The Indian Express gave the film 2 stars, commenting that "Suri is an innate storyteller, and can keep things moving. All he needs is a strong, all-the-way credible, original plot." Saibal Chatterjee of NDTV rated the film 2/5 and wrote that "As a whole, this film, besides its surface flair, does not have too much to fall back upon. Watch it only if that is good enough for you." Raja Sen of Rediff gave the film 1.5 stars out of 5, stating that "Given free tickets, sure, you could escape Humshakals in theatres this weekend with this mediocre effort, but I say do yourself a favour and seek out the Korean DVD. (Uncover it, even.) Now that's bloody special."

=== Box office ===
Ek Villain had what Box Office India called "very good" opening, with occupancies at around 55–60%. The film earned around ₹167 million (US$1.7 million) in its first day and around ₹507 million (US$5.3 million) in its first weekend, collecting around ₹165 million (US$1.7 million) and ₹174 million (US$1.8 million) in its second and third days respectively. The film collected ₹1.013 billion (US$11 million) in two weeks. Box Office India reported that it will earn around ₹1.08 billion (US$11 million) in India alone. The film earned a distributor share of around ₹510 million (US$5.3 million) (Share).

Ek Villain collected ₹132 million (US$1.4 million) outside India in its first weekend.

== Sequel ==
A standalone sequel, Ek Villain 2, which was later renamed as Ek Villain Returns, was officially announced on 30 January 2020. The film shows a face-off between two villains played by Arjun Kapoor & John Abraham while Disha Patani & Tara Sutaria play female leads, and was released on 29 July 2022. The song "Galliyan" was recreated for the film titled "Galliyan Returns" sung and composed by Tiwari and written by Muntashir.

Shaad Randhawa and Riteish Deshmukh reprise their roles as ACP Aditya Rathore and Rakesh Mahadkar from the first film, respectively; with Deshmukh appearing in archived footage and later physically as a cameo in the mid-credits scene, revealing that he survived his fate from the first film.

== In popular culture ==
- Deshmukh appeared in a cameo in the 2016 film Kyaa Kool Hain Hum 3 where, disguised as Rakesh, he is seen reciting his trademark promise. The film, also produced by Shobha and Ekta Kapoor, mentioned the song "Galliyan".
- Deshmukh's other cameo in the 2016 film Mastizaade in the title track features him once again reprising his role as Rakesh. The film was written and directed by Milap Zaveri who wrote the dialogues for Ek Villain.
- Zaveri's 2019 film Marjaavaan, which marks Malhotra's and Deshmukh's reunion after Ek Villain, has the latter's entry scene set to the song "Galliyan".
- Characters in The Half of It watch, and then imitate, the scene of Guru chasing Aisha's train.

== Awards and nominations ==
Award	Category	Recipients and nominees	Result	Ref.
BIG Star Entertainment Awards	Most Entertaining Actor in a Thriller Film	Riteish Deshmukh	Won	
BIG Star Entertainment Awards	Most Entertaining Thriller Film	Ekta Kapoor, Shobha Kapoor	Won	
BIG Star Entertainment Awards	Most Entertaining Singer (Male)	Ankit Tiwari – "Galliyan"	Won	
BIG Star Entertainment Awards	Most Entertaining Actress in a Thriller Film	Shraddha Kapoor	Nominated	
BIG Star Entertainment Awards	Most Entertaining Actress in a Lead Role	Shraddha Kapoor	Nominated	
BIG Star Entertainment Awards	Most Entertaining Director	Mohit Suri	Nominated	
BIG Star Entertainment Awards	Most Entertaining Film of the Year	Ekta Kapoor, Shobha Kapoor	Nominated	
BIG Star Entertainment Awards	Most Entertaining Song	Ankit Tiwari – "Galliyan"	Nominated	
BIG Star Entertainment Awards	Most Entertaining Music	Ankit Tiwari, Mithoon, Rabbi Ahmed, Adnan Dhool, DJ Shadow	Nominated	
7th Mirchi Music Awards	Song of The Year	"Galliyan"	Nominated	
7th Mirchi Music Awards	Album of The Year	Mithoon, Ankit Tiwari, Rabbi Ahmad, Adnaan Dhool, Manoj Muntashir	Nominated	
7th Mirchi Music Awards	Male Vocalist of The Year	Ankit Tiwari – "Galliyan"	Nominated	
7th Mirchi Music Awards	Music Composer of The Year	Ankit Tiwari – "Galliyan"	Nominated	
7th Mirchi Music Awards	Lyricist of The Year	Manoj Muntashir – "Galliyan"	Nominated	
7th Mirchi Music Awards	Upcoming Female Vocalist of The Year	Shraddha Kapoor – "Galliyan" (Unplugged)	Nominated	
7th Mirchi Music Awards	Upcoming Music Composer of The Year	Rabbi Ahmad & Adnan Dhool (Soch) – "Awari"	Nominated	
7th Mirchi Music Awards	Upcoming Lyricist of The Year	Rabbi Ahmad & Adnan Dhool (Soch) – "Awari"	Nominated	
7th Mirchi Music Awards	Listeners' Choice Album of the Year	Mithoon, Ankit Tiwari, Rabbi Ahmad, Adnaan Dhool, Manoj Muntashir	Won	
60th Filmfare Awards	Best Supporting Actor	Riteish Deshmukh	Nominated	
60th Filmfare Awards	Best Music Director	Mithoon, Ankit Tiwari, Soch	Nominated	
60th Filmfare Awards	Best Playback Singer (Male)	Ankit Tiwari – "Galliyan"	Won	
Global Indian Music Academy Awards	Best Engineer – Film Album	Eric Pillai	Won	
Global Indian Music Academy Awards	Most Popular Singer of the Year	Ankit Tiwari – "Galliyan"	Won	
Global Indian Music Academy Awards	Celebrity Singer of the Year	Shraddha Kapoor – "Galliyan"	Won	
Global Indian Music Academy Awards	Most Popular Song of the Year	Ankit Tiwari – "Galliyan"	Won	
Global Indian Music Academy Awards	Best Music Arranger and Programmer	Dhrubajyoti Phukan – "Awari"	Nominated	
Global Indian Music Academy Awards	Best Music Debut	Shraddha Kapoor – "Galliyan"	Nominated	
Global Indian Music Academy Awards	Best Playback Singer (Male)	Ankit Tiwari – "Galliyan"	Nominated	
Global Indian Music Academy Awards	Best Lyricist	Manoj Muntashir – "Galliyan"	Nominated	
Global Indian Music Academy Awards	Best Music Director	Mithoon, Ankit Tiwari, Soch	Nominated	
16th IIFA Awards	Best Supporting Actor	Riteish Deshmukh	Won	
16th IIFA Awards	Best Lyricist	Manoj Muntashir – "Galliyan"	Won	
16th IIFA Awards	Best Playback Singer (Male)	Ankit Tiwari – "Galliyan"	Won	
16th IIFA Awards	Best Sound Recording	Eric Pillai	Won	
16th IIFA Awards	Best Performance in a Negative Role	Riteish Deshmukh	Nominated	
16th IIFA Awards	Best Music Director	Mithoon, Ankit Tiwari, Soch	Nominated	
21st Screen Awards	Best Music Director	Mithoon, Ankit Tiwari, Soch	Won	
21st Screen Awards	Best Lyricist	Mithoon – "Banjaara"	Nominated	
21st Screen Awards	Best Playback Singer (Male)	Ankit Tiwari – "Galliyan"	Nominated	
