= Tara Sutaria =

Indian actress and singer (born 1995)

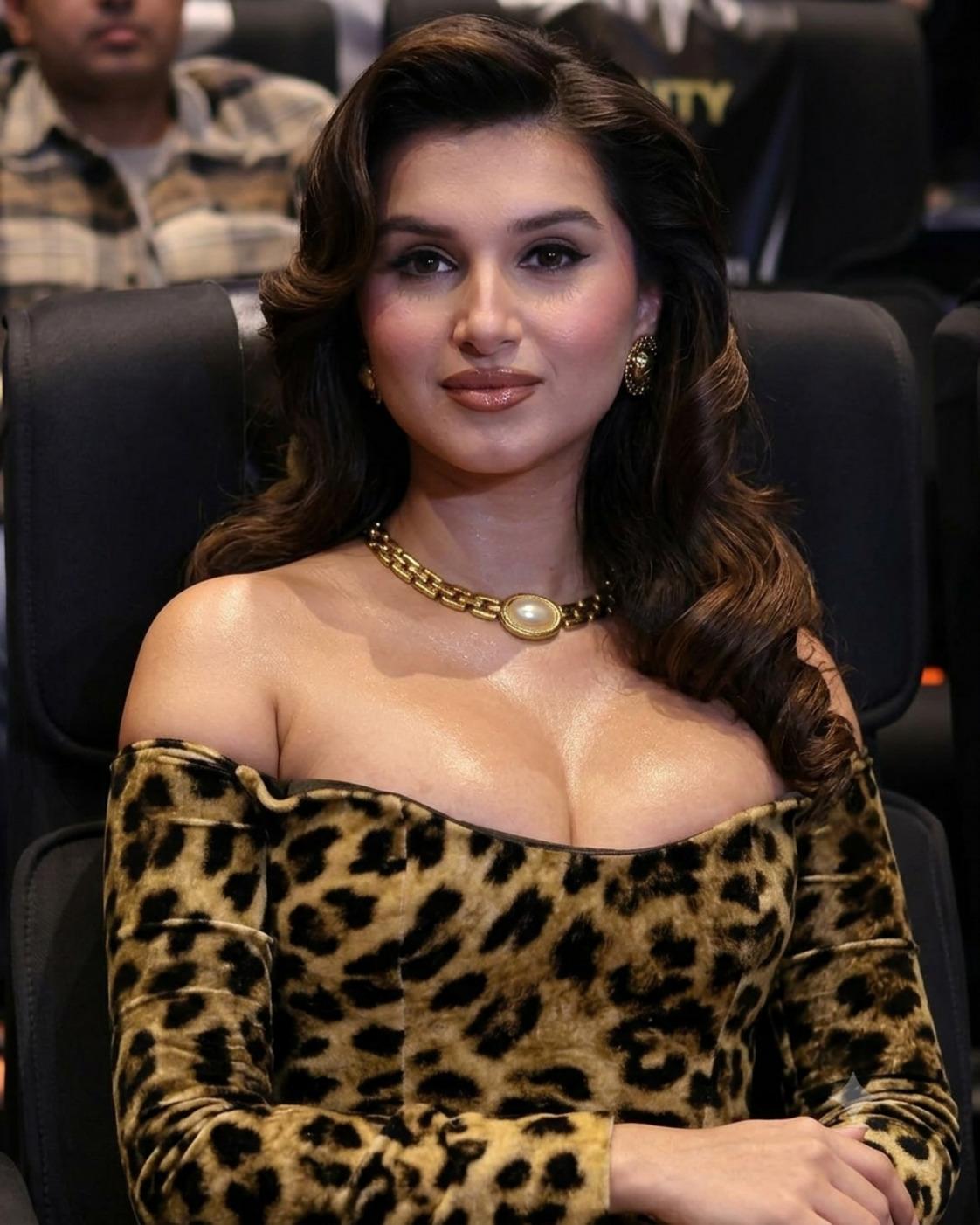
- Sutaria in 2026
- Born: 19 November 1995 (age 30); Mumbai, Maharashtra, India
- Education: St. Andrew's College
- Occupations: Actress; singer; Music composer
- Years active: 2019–present

Tara Sutaria (born 19 November 1995) is an Indian actress and singer who works in Hindi films. She began her career as a singer in Disney India's reality show Big Bada Boom (2010) and transitioned to acting with the channel's sitcoms The Suite Life of Karan and Kabir (2012) and Oye Jassie (2013).

Sutaria made her film debut in 2019 with Student of the Year 2, for which she won the Zee Cine Award for Best Female Debut. She then played the leading lady in the androcentric action films Marjaavaan (2019) and Ek Villain Returns (2022). An against-type performance for Sutaria came in the survival thriller Apurva (2023) and she has since starred in the Kannada action film Toxic (2026).

== Early life and education ==
Tara Sutaria was born on 19 November 1995 in Mumbai. Her father, Himanshu Sutaria, is a Hindu, and her mother, Tina Sutaria, is a Zoroastrian belonging to the Parsi community. Her name means "star" in Sanskrit. She has a twin sister named Pia. Both trained in classical ballet, modern dance and Latin American dances at the School of Classical Ballet and Western Dance, Royal Academy of Dance, United Kingdom and the Imperial Society for Teachers of Dancing, United Kingdom. She has been a professional singer since she was seven years old, having sung in operas and competitions since then. She received bachelor's degree in Mass Media from St. Andrew's College of Arts, Science and Commerce.

== Career ==
=== Early television career (2010–2013) ===
Sutaria started her association with Disney Channel India as a video jockey and continued to be associated with them, having two successful sitcoms to her credit. She has also been recording music in India and abroad for films, advertisements, and her own original work. Her song "Slippin' Through My Fingers" is part of the Ashwin Gidwani Production of Bharat Dhabholkar's Blame It On Yashraj. She has also played the lead role of Sandy in Raell Padamsee's production of the musical Grease.

She has recorded and performed solo concerts in London, Tokyo, Lavasa and Mumbai. She has performed with Louiz Banks and Mikey McCleary and has also been a soloist for the Stop-Gaps Choral Ensemble, singing at the NCPA for over a decade. She was one of the top seven finalists of the 2008 "Pogo Amazing Kids Awards" in the singer category. She received recognition for her roles of Vinnie in The Suite Life of Karan & Kabir and Jassie in Oye Jassie.

=== Film expansion and career downturn (2019–present) ===
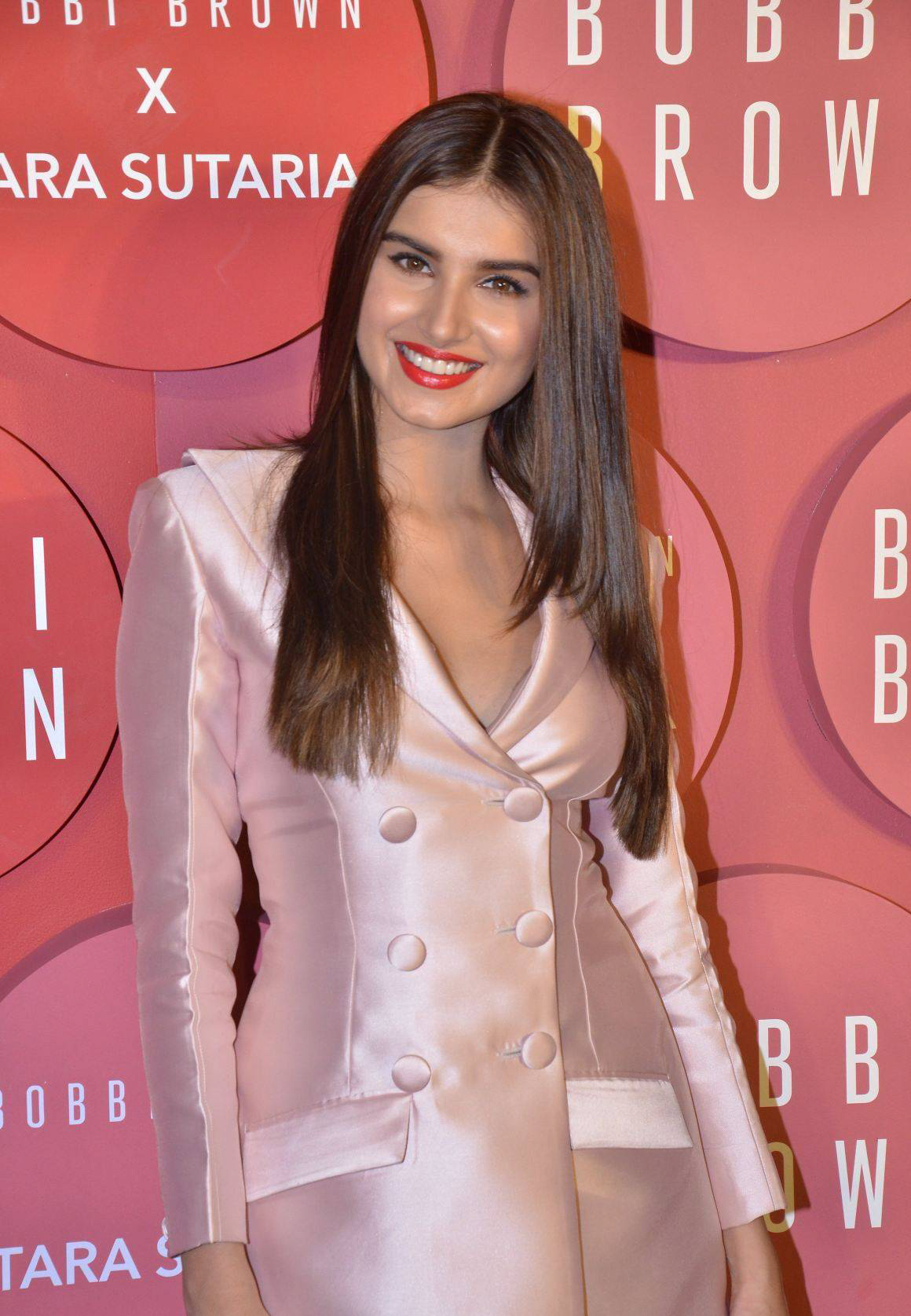
Sutaria in 2019

Sutaria was among two actresses selected for the part of Princess Jasmine in the American fantasy film Aladdin (2019), but lost the role to Naomi Scott. She made her film debut later that year with Punit Malhotra's coming-of-age teen film Student of the Year 2 alongside Tiger Shroff and Ananya Panday. Produced by Karan Johar, it served as a standalone sequel to Student of the Year (2012) and narrates the story of a college student (portrayed by Shroff) who competes to win an annual school championship. Reviewing the film for The Indian Express, Shubhra Gupta wrote, "Tara Sutaria is perfectly put together and yet looks assembly-line produced". She received a nomination for the Filmfare Award for Best Female Debut. It did not perform well commercially.

Later in 2019, Sutaria played the role of Zoya, a mute music teacher, alongside Sidharth Malhotra, Riteish Deshmukh and Rakul Preet Singh, in Milap Zaveri's action film Marjaavaan. The film had a worldwide gross of ₹65.35 crores. In a scathing review for The Hindu, Namrata Joshi found the film to be "loud, overcooked and overdone" and wrote that Sutaria was reduced to "smiling and weeping alternately". In 2021 Sutaria and debutante Ahan Shetty starred in the Milan Luthria directed romantic thriller Tadap, a remake of Telugu film RX 100 (2018). It received mixed reviews from critics. Rachana Dubey of Times of India wrote, "Tadap unabashedly plays to the gallery with action, music, and well-shot visuals, she further praised the performances of Shetty, Sutaria and Shukla. The film underperformed at the box office.

"The films I've done or the way I've been presented have been a reason for people to believe that I'm just a one or two-dimensional actress and that I can't do other stuff, which has been extremely infuriating."

— Sutaria, 2023

In her first release of 2022, she reunited with Shroff in Ahmed Khan's actioner Heropanti 2 which received negative reviews from critics with Saibal Chaterjee from NDTV stating, "Tara Sutaria is as clueless as the screenplay writer about the manner in which the character should be projected." It was a major commercial failure at the box office. In her second release of the year, she starred as Aarvi Malhotra opposite Arjun Kapoor in Mohit Suri's action thriller Ek Villain Returns, which also starred John Abraham and Disha Patani. The film received mixed reviews from critics with Sutaria experiencing her third consecutive commercial disappointment. Sukanya Verma of Rediff.com opined that "Tara Sutaria is exactly how she was in her first, second, third and fourth film". Critics found her roles to be limited to androcentric films in which she performed poorly.

Keen to showcase her acting skills, Sutaria played the eponymous role in the crime thriller Apurva (2023), which released on Disney+ Hotstar to mixed reviews from critics. Despite disliking the film, Deepa Gahlot wrote, "If at all the film does anything, it is to offer Tara Sutaria a role that allows her to act, rather than just dress up and play pretty love interest to the leading man".

Following a three-year hiatus, Sutaria featured opposite Yash in Geetu Mohandas' Kannada action film Toxic (2026), which was panned by critics. Despite becoming the fourth highest-grossing Kannada film of all-time, the film failed at the box-office.

Sutaria will next appear opposite Aditya Roy Kapur in a musical love story.

== Media image ==
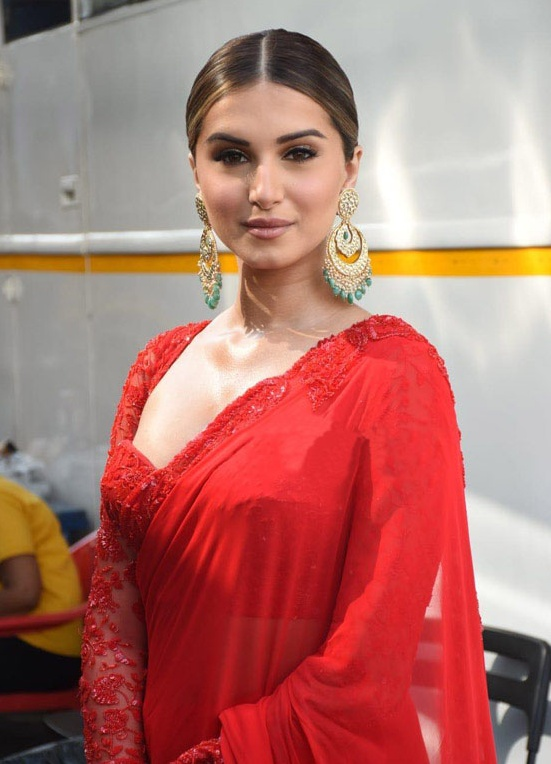
Sutaria in 2022

Sutaria became the eighth highest trending personality on Google in India, in 2019. In Times' 50 Most Desirable Women list, Sutaria was placed 13th in 2019 and 12th in 2020. In May 2026, Sutaria was named among the six honorees for the Women in Cinema Gala hosted by the Red Sea Film Foundation during the 2026 Cannes Film Festival.

Sutaria supports a number of causes such as animal welfare and feminism. She has ramp walked at the Lakme Fashion Week and has been cover model for various magazines. Sutaria is a celebrity endorser for several brands and products including Bobbi Brown Cosmetics, Hazoorilal Legacy Jewellers and Nature 4 Nature. For the latter's adfilm, she featured alongside Ishaan Khattar.

== Filmography ==
Key
†	Denotes films that have not yet been released

=== Films ===
- All films are in Hindi unless otherwise noted.

Year	Title	Role	Notes	Refs
2019	Student of the Year 2	Mridula "Mia" Chawla		
2019	Marjaavaan	Zoya Ahmed		
2021	Tadap	Ramisa Nautiyal		
2022	Heropanti 2	Inaaya Saran		
2022	Ek Villain Returns	Aarvi Malhotra		
2023	Apurva	Apurva Kashyap		
2026	Toxic	Rebecca Almeida	Kannada-English bilingual film	
2027	Parwana †	TBA	Filming	

=== Television ===
Year	Title	Role	Notes	Ref.
2010	Big Bada Boom	Herself		
2011	Entertainment Ke Liye Kuch Bhi Karega	Contestant	Season 4	
2012	Best of Luck Nikki	Nina / Tina	Cameo appearance	
2012–2013	The Suite Life of Karan & Kabir	Vinita "Vinnie" Mishra		
2013–2014	Oye Jassie	Jaspreet "Jassie" Singh		
2013	Shake It Up	Herself	Cameo appearance	

=== Music video appearances ===
Year	Title	Singer(s)	Ref.
2020	"Masakali 2.0"	Tulsi Kumar, Sachet Tandon	
2023	"Mulaqat"	Prateek Kuhad	
2025	"Pyaar Aata Hai"	Shreya Ghoshal, Rito Riba	
2025	"Thodi Si Daaru"	AP Dhillon, Shreya Ghoshal	

== Discography ==
Year	Album	Song	Co-singer(s)	Ref.
2021	Non-album single	"Hum Hindustani"	Various	
2022	Ek Villain Returns	"Shaamat"	Ankit Tiwari	

== Awards and nominations ==
Year	Award	Category	Work	Result	Ref.
2019	Screen Awards	Best Female Debut	Student of the Year 2	Nominated	
2020	Filmfare Awards	Best Female Debut	Student of the Year 2	Nominated	
2020	Zee Cine Awards	Best Female Debut	Student of the Year 2	Won	
2022	Pinkvilla Style Icons Awards	Stylish Emerging Talent – Female	—N/a	Nominated	
2024	Pinkvilla Screen and Style Icons Awards	Best Actress OTT – Popular Choice	Apurva	Nominated	

== See also ==
- List of Indian film actresses
- List of Hindi film actresses
