= List of awards and nominations received by Shreya Ghoshal =

List of awards won by Shreya Ghoshal

List of awards won by Shreya Ghoshal
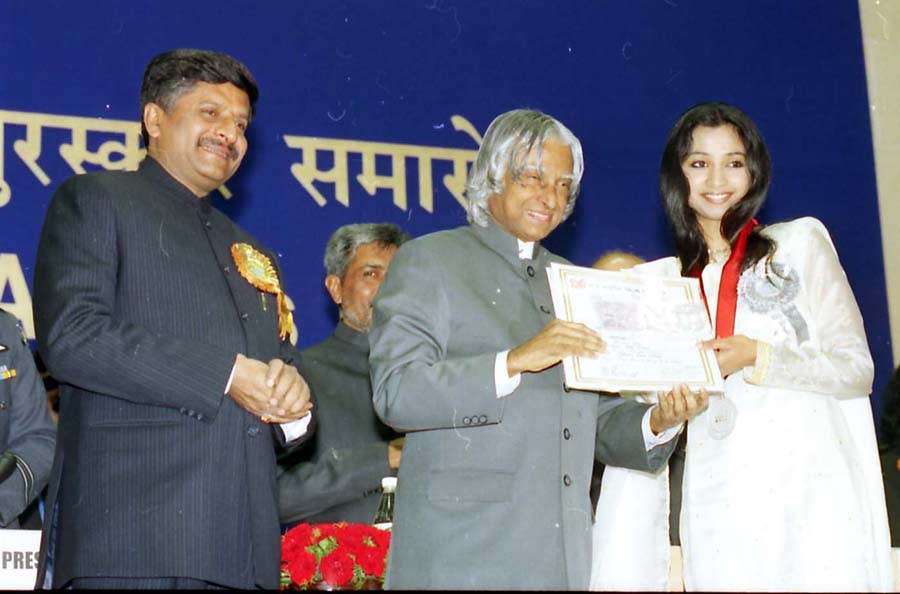
- Dr. A. P. J. Abdul Kalam presenting Shreya Ghoshal the National Film Award for "Bairi Piya".
Awards	Wins	Nominations
National Film Awards	5	N/A
Kerala State Film Awards	4	N/A
Tamil Nadu State Film Awards	2	N/A
Telangana Gaddar Film Awards	1	N/A
Maharashtra State Film Awards	0	1
Filmfare Awards	7*	30
Filmfare Awards South	10	48
Filmfare Awards Bangla	0	11
Filmfare Awards Marathi	0	8
IIFA Awards	11	30
IIFA Utsavam	2	8
Mirchi Music Awards	20*	79
Mirchi Music Awards South	7*	31
Mirchi Music Awards Bangla	7*	21
Mirchi Music Awards Marathi	4	17
RMIM Puraskaar	25*	59
Guild Awards	4	16
GiMA Awards	3*	13
Screen Awards	7	18
West Bengal Film Journalists' Association Awards	2	8
Zee Cine Awards	9	24
- * represents the awards won in more than one category.
- Total
Awards won	295+
Nominations	749+

Shreya Ghoshal is an Indian singer. She has recorded songs for films and albums in various Indian and foreign languages including Hindi, Marathi, Tamil, Malayalam, Telugu, Kannada, Gujarati, Bengali, Assamese, Nepali, Odia, Bhojpuri, Punjabi, Urdu, Tulu etc, and has established herself as one of the leading and one of the most awarded singers of India.

Ghoshal's career began when she won the Sa Re Ga Ma Pa contest as an adult. Her Bollywood playback singing career began with Devdas, for which she received National Film Award for Best Female Playback Singer along with Filmfare Award for Best Female Playback Singer and Filmfare R. D. Burman Award for New Music Talent.

Apart from playback singing, Ghoshal has appeared as a judge on several television reality shows. She performs in musical concerts around the world. She has been honored by the US state of Ohio, where the governor Ted Strickland declared 26 June 2010 as "Shreya Ghoshal Day". In April 2013, she was awarded with the highest honour in London by the selected members of House of Commons of the United Kingdom. In July 2015, John Cranley, the Mayor of the City of Cincinnati also honoured her by proclaiming 24 July 2015 as "Shreya Ghoshal Day of Entertainment and Inspiration" in Cincinnati. She was also featured five times in Forbes' list of the top 100 celebrities of India. In 2017, Ghoshal became the first Indian singer to have a wax figure of her in Madame Tussauds Museum.

== Anandalok Puraskar ==
The Anandalok Puraskar or Anandalok Awards were presented by the ABP Group for outstanding achievement in Bengali cinema.

Year	Category	Nominated work	Result	Ref.
2005	Best Female Playback Singer	Manik	Won	
2012	Best Film Song of the Year	Paglu 2	Nominated	
2025	Best Female Singer (Film)	"Na Tui Amar Hobi Na" - Ajogyo	Nominated	

== Ananda Vikatan Cinema Awards ==
Ananda Vikatan Cinema Awards were introduced in 2008 to honour artists in the Tamil film industry annually. It is presented by the Tamil language weekly magazine Ananda Vikatan. Ghoshal has won two awards.

Year	Nominated Song	Film	Result	Ref.
2010	"Mannipaaya"	Vinnaithaandi Varuvaayaa	Won	
2017	"Neethanae" "Mazhaikkulle"	Mersal Puriyatha Puthir	Won	
2019	"Anbe Peranbe"	NGK	Nominated	
2020-2021	"Anney Yaaranney" "Saara Kaattrae"	Udanpirappe Annaatthe	Nominated	
2022	"Ratchasa Maamaney" "Maayava Thooyava"	Ponniyin Selvan: I Iravin Nizhal	Nominated	

== Annual Central European Bollywood Awards ==
The Annual Central European Bollywood Awards are fan awards with the voters mostly from Germany, Austria and Switzerland. They are users of the Bollywood Forum belonging to the film website, organizer of the ACEBAs. These awards have been discontinued after 2013. Ghoshal has received four awards from nine nominations.

Year	Film	Nominated song	Result	Ref.
2007	Lage Raho Munna Bhai	"Pal Pal Har Pal"	Nominated	
2007	Aryan	"Janeman"	Nominated	
2008	Guru	"Barso Re"	Won	
2008	Jab We Met	"Yeh Ishq Haye"	Nominated	
2008	Cheeni Kum	"Cheeni Kum"	Nominated	
2009	Singh Is Kinng	"Teri Ore"	Won	
2010	3 Idiots	"Zoobi Doobi"	Won	
2010	Kisaan	"Humko Kehna Hai"	Nominated	
2012	Bodyguard	"Teri Meri"	Won	

== Asianet Film Awards ==
The Asianet Film Awards is an award ceremony for Malayalam films presented annually by Asianet, a Malayalam-language television network from the south-Indian state of Kerala. Ghoshal has received three awards.

Year	Song	Film	Result	Ref.
2010	"Chaandhu Thottille"	Banaras	Nominated	
2010	"Anuraga Vilochananayi"	Neelathamara	Nominated	
2011	"Manju Mazha"	Aagathan	Won	
2012	"Kannoram Chingaram"	Rathinirvedam	Won	
2013	"Nilave Nilave"	Chattakkari	Nominated	
2015	"Vijanathayil"	How Od Are You?	Nominated	
2019	"Kondoram"	Odiyan	Won	

== Asiavision Movie Awards ==
The Asiavision Movie Awards are held annually since 2006 to honour the artists and technicians of South Indian Cinema. Ghoshal has received three awards.

Year	Film	Nominated song	Result	Ref.
2012	Veeraputhran	"Kannodu Kannoram"	Won	
2013	Mallu Singh	"Cham Cham"	Won	
2013	Chattakaari	"Nilave Nilave"	Won	
2016	Ennu Ninte Moideen	"Kaathirunnu"	Nominated	
2019	Odiyan	"Kondoram"	Won	
2019	Odiyan	"Maanam Thudukkanu"	Won	
2019	Theevandi	"Jeevamshamayi"	Won	

== Bengal Film Journalists' Association Awards ==
The Bengal Film Journalists' Association Awards (BFJA Awards) are presented by the Bengal Film Journalists' Association, the oldest association of film critics in India, founded in 1937, to acknowledge noteworthy performance in Bengali cinema.

Year	Category	Nominated work	Result	Ref.
2005	Best Female Playback Singer	Shudhu Tumi	Won	
2006	Best Female Playback Singer	Shubhodrishti	Won	

== BIG Bangla Movie Awards ==
The BIG Bangla Music Awards are presented by the BIG FM Kolkata station bestow excellent achievement in Bengali music. The scope of the event was later extended and it was renamed as BIG Bangla Movie Awards.

Year	Category	Film	Nominated song	Result	Ref.
2010	Female Singer of the Year	Antaheen	"Pherari Mon"	Nominated	
2010	Female Singer of the Year	Antaheen	"Jao Pakhi"	Won	
2010	Song of the Year	Antaheen	"Jao Pakhi"	Won	
2011	Female Singer of the Year	Autograph	"Chawl Raastaye"	Won	

== BIG Star Entertainment Awards ==
The BIG Star Entertainment Awards are presented annually by Reliance Broadcast Network Limited in association with Star India to honour personalities from the field of entertainment across movies, music, television, sports, theater and dance. Ghoshal has received an award from seven nominations.

Year	Category	Film	Nominated song	Result	Ref.
2010	BIG Star Decade Singer	Overall Performance During the Decade		Nominated	
2011	BIG Star Most Entertaining Female Singer	Bodyguard	"Teri Meri"	Won	
2011	BIG Star Most Entertaining Female Singer	The Dirty Picture	"Ooh La La"	Nominated	
2012	BIG Star Most Entertaining Female Singer	Jab Tak Hai Jaan	"Saans"	Nominated	
2012	BIG Star Most Entertaining Female Singer	Agneepath	"Chikni Chameli "	Nominated	
2013	BIG Star Most Entertaining Female Singer	Goliyon Ki Rasleela Ram-Leela	"Nagada Sang Dhol"	Nominated	
2014	BIG Star Most Entertaining Female Singer	Humpty Sharma Ki Dulhania	"Samjhawan"	Nominated	

== Bollywood Hungama Surfers Choice Music Awards ==
The Bollywood Hungama Surfers Choice Music Awards were presented by Bollywood Hungama to honour the musical work of the artists throughout the Year. The winners have been selected based on the number of votes acquired by each of the contenders. These awards have been discontinued after 2016. Ghoshal has received two awards from four nominations.

Year	Film	Nominated song	Result	Ref.
2013	Aashiqui 2	"Sunn Raha Hai"	Won	
2013	Goliyon Ki Rasleela Ram-Leela	Nagada Sang Dhol	Nominated	
2014	Kick	"Hangover"	Won	
2015	Bajirao Mastani	"Deewani Mastani"	Nominated	

== Chandanavana Film Critics Academy Awards ==
Chandanavana Film Critics Academy is a forum of Kannada cinema journalists, freelancers and critics who nominate movies based on the list provided by the Nominations Committee for the given year. This process has the participation of around 70 journalists from different organisations. The award started in 2020. Shreya Ghoshal has received two nominations in the category Best Playback Singer (Female) so far.

Year	Song	Film	Result	Ref.
2020	"Neene Modalu"	Kiss	Nominated	
2022	"Neenade Na"	Yuvarathnaa	Nominated	

== Edison Awards ==
The Edison Awards is an annual awards ceremony since 2009 for people in the Tamil film industry. Shreya Ghoshal has won three awards for Best Female Playback Singer from many nominations.

Year	Song	Film	Result	Ref.
2015	"Kandangi Kandangi"	Jilla	Won	
2016	"Pookkalae Sattru Oyivedungal"	I	Won	
2017	"Pothavillaye"	Mudinja Ivana Pudi	Won	
2018	"Neethanae"	Mersal	Nominated	
2019	"Onnavitta Yaarum Yenakilla"	Seemaraja	Nominated	
2020	"Anbae Peranbae"	NGK	Nominated	
2023	"Ratchasa Maamaney"	Ponniyin Selvan: I	Nominated	
2024	"Kalapakkaara"	King of Kotha	Won	

== Filmfare Awards ==
The Filmfare Awards are one of the oldest and most prestigious Hindi film awards. They are presented annually by The Times Group for excellence of cinematic achievements. Ghoshal received six awards from thirty nominations. Besides this, she also received Filmfare RD Burman Award for New Music Talent in 2003 for her outstanding performance in Devdas.

=== Filmfare Award for Best Female Playback Singer ===
Year	Nominated Song	Film	Result	Ref.
2003	"Dola Re Dola" (along with Kavita Krishnamurthy)	Devdas	Won	
2003	"Bairi Piya"	Devdas	Nominated	
2004	"Jaadu Hai Nasha Hai"	Jism	Won	
2006	"Agar Tum Mil Jao"	Zeher	Nominated	
2006	"Piyu Bole"	Parineeta	Nominated	
2007	"Pal Pal Har Pal"	Lage Raho Munna Bhai	Nominated	
2008	"Barso Re"	Guru	Won	
2008	"Yeh Ishq Haye"	Jab We Met	Nominated	
2009	"Teri Ore"	Singh Is Kinng	Won	
2010	"Zoobi Doobi"	3 Idiots	Nominated	
2011	"Bahara"	I Hate Luv Storys	Nominated	
2011	"Noor-e-Khuda"	My Name Is Khan	Nominated	
2012	"Teri Meri"	Bodyguard	Nominated	
2012	"Saibo"	Shor in the City	Nominated	
2013	"Saans"	Jab Tak Hai Jaan	Nominated	
2013	"Chikni Chameli"	Agneepath	Nominated	
2014	"Sunn Raha Hai"	Aashiqui 2	Nominated	
2014	"Nagada Sang Dhol"	Goliyon Ki Raasleela Ram-Leela	Nominated	
2015	"Manwa Laage"	Happy New Year	Nominated	
2016	"Deewani Mastani"	Bajirao Mastani	Won	
2018	"Thodi Der"	Half Girlfriend	Nominated	
2019	"Ghoomar"	Padmaavat	Won	
2020	"Yeh Aaina"	Kabir Singh	Nominated	
2020	"Ghar More Pardesiya" (along with Vaishali Mhade)	Kalank	Nominated	
2022	"Param Sundari"	Mimi	Nominated	
2022	"Chaka Chak"	Atrangi Re	Nominated	
2023	"Jab Saiyaan"	Gangubai Kathiawadi	Nominated	
2024	"Tum Kya Mile"	Rocky Aur Rani Kii Prem Kahaani	Nominated	
2024	"Ve Kamleya"	Rocky Aur Rani Kii Prem Kahaani	Nominated	
2025	"Dheeme Dheeme"	Laapataa Ladies	Nominated	

=== Filmfare RD Burman Award for New Music Talent ===
Year	Film	Nominated song	Result	Ref.
2003	Devdas	"Bairi Piya"	Won	

== Filmfare Awards Bangla ==
The Filmfare Awards Bangla is the Bengali segment of the annual Filmfare Awards, presented by The Times Group to honour both artistic and technical excellence of professionals in the East Indian (Bengali) film industry. Ghoshal received eleven nominations in the category of Best Female Playback Singer.

Year	Nominated Song	Film	Result	Ref.
2014	"Baalir Shoror"	Mishawr Rawhoshyo	Nominated	
2017	"Tomar Ki Naam"	Shaheb Bibi Golaam	Nominated	
2017	"Kolkata"	Praktan	Nominated	
2017	"Tomake Chhuye Dilam"	Bastu-Shaap	Nominated	
2018	"Tui Chunli Jakhan"	Samantaral	Nominated	
2021	"Tomake"	Parineeta	Nominated	
2021	"Neel Digante"	Gotro	Nominated	
2023	"Bhalobashar Morshum"	X=Prem	Nominated	
2023	"Keno Je Tomakey"	Bismillah	Nominated	
2025	"Aj Shara Bela"	Bohurupi	Nominated	
2025	"Tui Amar Hobi Na"	Ajogyo	Nominated	

== Filmfare Awards Marathi ==
The Filmfare Awards Marathi is the Marathi segment of the annual Filmfare Awards, presented by The Times Group to honour both artistic and technical excellence of professionals in the Marathi cinema. Ghoshal has received eight nominations for the Best Female Playback Singer.

Year	Song	Film	Result	Ref.
2017	"Aatacha Baya Ka"	Sairat	Nominated	
2021	"Baghta Tula Me"	Premvari	Nominated	
2022	"Navasa Ishara"	Bonus	Nominated	
2023	"Chandra"	Chandramukhi	Nominated	
2023	"Ram Ram Lori"	Me Vasantrao	Nominated	
2023	"Sukh Kalale"	Ved	Nominated	
2024	"Baharla Ha Madhumasa"	Maharashtra Shahir	Nominated	
2024	"Rang Jarasa Ola"	Jhimma 2	Nominated	

== Filmfare Awards South ==
The Filmfare Awards South is the South Indian segment of the annual Filmfare Awards, presented by The Times Group to honour both artistic and technical excellence of professionals in the South Indian film industry. Ghoshal is the most awarded and also the most nominated person by Filmfare South, receiving ten awards from forty-eight nominations.

=== Kannada ===
Ghoshal has received two Kannada Best Playback Singer awards from sixteen nominations.

Year	Nominated song	Film	Result	Ref.
2009	"Ninna Nodalenthu"	Mussanjemaatu	Won	
2009	"Aakasha Bhoomi"	Mussanjemaatu	Nominated	
2009	"Moggina Manasali"	Moggina Manasu	Nominated	
2010	"Hoovina Banadhande"	Birugaali	Nominated	
2010	"Yenu Helabeku"	Maleyali Jotheyali	Nominated	
2011	"Eradu Jedeyannu"	Jackie	Nominated	
2011	"Yello Jinugiruva"	Just Math Mathalli	Nominated	
2012	"Gaganave Baagi"	Sanju Weds Geetha	Won	
2012	"Maayavi Maayavi"	Lifeu Ishtene	Nominated	
2013	"Aalochane"	Romeo	Nominated	
2013	"Yenendhu Hesaridali"	Anna Bond	Nominated	
2014	"Modala Maleyanthe"	Mynaa	Nominated	
2015	"Kaakig Banna Kantha"	Ulidavaru Kandanthe	Nominated	
2016	"Shuru Shuru"	1st Rank Raju	Nominated	
2017	"Neenire Saniha"	Kirik Party	Nominated	
2022	"Kannu Hodiyaka"	Roberrt	Nominated	

=== Malayalam ===
Ghoshal has received four Malayalam Best Playback Singer awards from fourteen nominations.

Year	Film	Nominated song	Result	Ref.
2010	Banaras	"Chandhu Thottille"	Nominated	
2011	Anwar	"Kizhakku Pookkum"	Won	
2011	Aagathan	"Manju Mazha Kaattil"	Nominated	
2012	Pranayam	"Paattil Ee Paattil"	Won	
2012	Salt N' Pepper	"Kaanamullal"	Nominated	
2013	Chattakaari	"Nilave Nilave"	Nominated	
2014	Kalimannu	"Shalabhamayi"	Nominated	
2015	How Old Are You?	"Vijanathayil"	Won	
2016	Ennu Ninte Moideen	"Kaathirunnu"	Won	
2016	Life of Josutty	"Mele Mele"	Nominated	
2018	Ramante Edanthottam	"Akale Oru Kaadinte"	Nominated	
2019	Odiyan	"Maanam Thudukkanu"	Nominated	
2019	Captain	"Paalthira Paadum"	Nominated	
2024	Ayisha	"Ayisha Ayisha"	Nominated	

=== Tamil ===
Ghoshal has received two Tamil Best Playback Singer awards from nine nominations.

Year	Film	Nominated song	Result	Ref.
2007	Sillunu Oru Kaadhal	"Munbe Vaa"	Won	
2009	Kuruvi	"Thaen Thaen"	Nominated	
2010	Pasanga	"Oru Vetkam"	Nominated	
2011	Angadi Theru	"Un Perai Sollum"	Won	
2013	Kumki	"Solitaley Ava Kadhala"	Nominated	
2016	I	"Pookkale Sattru"	Nominated	
2018	Mersal	"Neethanae"	Nominated	
2023	Vendhu Thanindhathu Kaadu	"Unna Nenachadhum"	Nominated	
2023	Iravin Nizhal	"Maayava Thooyava"	Nominated	

=== Telugu ===
Ghoshal has won two awards for Best Female Playback Singer (Telugu) from ten nominations.

Year	Film	Nominated song	Result	Ref.
2006	Athadu	"Pillagali Allari"	Nominated	
2006	Modati Cinema	"Neeke Nuvvu"	Nominated	
2009	Chintakayala Ravi	"Merupulaa"	Nominated	
2012	Sri Rama Rajyam	"Jagadhananda Karaka"	Won	
2013	Krishnam Vande Jagadgurum	"Sai Andri Nanu"	Nominated	
2014	Naayak	"Hey Nayak"	Nominated	
2015	Manam	"Chinni Chinni Aasalu"	Nominated	
2016	Kanche	"Nijamenani"	Nominated	
2019	Bhaagamathie	"Mandaraa Mandaraa"	Won	
2025	Pushpa 2: The Rule	"Sooseki"	Nominated	

== FOI Online Awards ==
FOI Online Awards is an annual online poll, researched, organised and voted by a team of film enthusiasts, honouring the artists for their artworks. The poll is held yearly in the month of January–February to judge the best of the Hindi film industry for their masterpieces in the previous year. The jury follows research and successive rounds of voting to elect nominations and winners. The 1st FOI Online Awards were announced on 14 February 2016 to judge the best of Hindi cinema in 2015.

=== Best Female Playback Singer ===
Ghoshal has won two awards from thirteen nominations.

Year	Song	Film	Result	Ref.
2016	"Deewani Mastani"	Bajirao Mastani	Won	
2016	"Mohe Rang Do Laal"	Bajirao Mastani	Nominated	
2017	"Rehnuma"	Rocky Handsome	Nominated	
2019	"Sarphiri"	Laila Majnu	Nominated	
2020	"Sapna Hai Sach Hai"	Panipat	Nominated	
2020	"Yeh Aaina"	Kabir Singh	Won	
2020	"Ghar More Pardesiya" (along with Vaishali Made)	Kalank	Nominated	
2021	"Taare Ginn"	Dil Bechara	Nominated	
2022	"Chaka Chak"	Atrangi Re	Nominated	
2023	"Jab Saiyaan"	Gangubai Kathiawadi	Nominated	
2024	"Itni Si Baat"	Sam Bahadur	Nominated	
2025	"Dheeme Dheeme"	Laapataa Ladies	Nominated	
2026	"Saiyaara Reprise - Female"	Saiyaara	Nominated	

=== Best Original Song ===
(For the category Best Original Song, Composer(s), Lyricist(s) and Singer(s) of the song are credited)

Shreya has received two award from six nominations.

Year	Song	Film	Result	Ref.
2019	"Ghoomar" (along with Music Composer Sanjay Leela Bhansali, Lyricist A. M. Turaz and Co-Singer Swaroop Khan)	Padmaavat	Won	
2020	"Yeh Aaina" (along with Music Composer Amaal Malik and Lyricist Irshad Kamil)	Kabir Singh	Nominated	
2022	"Ratti Ratti Reza Reza" (along with Music Composer Justin Prabhakaran, Lyricist Raj Shekhar, and Co-Singer Abhay Jodhpurkar)	Meenakshi Sundareshwar	Nominated	
2022	"Tere Rang" (along with Music Composer A. R. Rahman, Lyricist Irshad Kamil and Co-Singer Haricharan Seshadri)	Atrangi Re	Nominated	
2024	"Itni Si Baat" (along with Music Composer Shankar–Ehsaan–Loy, Lyricist Gulzar and Co-Singer Sonu Nigam)	Sam Bahadur	Won	
2025	"Dheeme Dheeme" (along with Music Composer Ram Sampath and Lyricist Swanand Kirkire)	Laapataa Ladies	Nominated	

== Films And Frames Digital Awards ==
Year	Category	Song	Film	Result	Ref.
2020	Helo Viewer's Choice – Best Playback (Female)	"Tomake"	Parineeta	Won	
2020	Helo Viewer's Choice - Best Song	"Tomake"	Parineeta	Won	
2020	Jury Awards – Best Playback	"Tomake"	Parineeta	Won	
2021	Best Female Playback (Viewer's Choice)	"Preme Tame (Title Song)"	Prem Tame	Nominated	

== Grammy Awards ==
Year	Category	Album	Song	Result	Ref.
2023	Best Global Music Album	Shuruaat (along with the musical team of Shuruaat)	"Sundari Pennae"	Nominated	

== Gaana User's Choice Icons ==
Gaana User's Choice Icons was started by Gaana in 2014. The winners are recognized on the basis of public voting on social networking platforms. The 2nd installment of the awards were held in 2018 (end of 2017), after a gap of three Years.

=== Hindi ===
Year	Category	Film	Nominated song	Result	Ref.
2014	Most Popular Singer (Female)	Aashiqui 2	"Sunn Raha Hai"	Won	
2017	Favourite Female Artist	Overall performance during the Year		Won	
2018	Best Female Singer	Padmaavat	"Ghoomar"	Nominated	
2020	Best Female Voice (Hindi)				

=== Tamil ===
Year	Category	Film	Nominated song	Result	Ref.
2018	Best Female Singer	Overall performance during the Year		Nominated	
2018	Best Song	Mersal	"Neethanae"	Nominated	
2020	Best Singer Female (Tamil)	NGK	"Anbae Peranbae"		

== Global Indian Music Academy Awards ==
The Global Indian Music Academy Awards are presented annually by Global Indian Music Academy to honour and recognise Indian music artists. Ghoshal received three awards in different categories.

Year	Category	Album	Nominated song	Result	Ref.
2012	Best Female Playback Singer	Agneepath	"Chikni Chameli"	Nominated	
2012	Best Female Playback Singer	Shor in the City	"Saibo"	Nominated	
2012	Best Female Playback Singer	The Dirty Picture	"Ooh La La"	Nominated	
2014	Best Female Playback Singer	Aashiqui 2	"Sunn Raha Hai"	Won	
2014	Best Female Playback Singer	Raanjhanaa	"Banarasiya"	Nominated	
2014	Best Duet	Bhaag Milkha Bhaag	"O Rangrez" (along with Javed Bashir)	Nominated	
2015	Best Duet	Happy New Year	"Manwa Laage" (along with Arijit Singh)	Nominated	
2015	Best Duet	Humpty Sharma Ki Dulhania	"Samjhawan" (along with Arijit Singh)	Won	
2015	Best Ghazal Album	Humnasheen		Nominated	
2016	Best Female Playback Singer	Bajirao Mastani	"Deewani Mastani"	Won	
2016	Best Female Playback Singer	Bajirao Mastani	"Mohe Rang Do Laal"	Nominated	
2016	Best Duet	Wazir	"Tere Bin" (along with Sonu Nigam)	Nominated	
2016	Best Duet	Bajirao Mastani	"Pinga" (along with Vaishali Mhade)	Nominated	

== Guild Awards ==
The Apsara Film & Television Producers Guild Awards are presented by the Apsara Producers Guild to honour and recognise the professional excellence of their peers. Ghoshal has received four awards from sixteen nominations. She holds the record of maximum awards and nominations in the Best Female Playback Singer category.

Year	Film	Nominated song	Result	Ref.
2006	Parineeta	"Piyu Bole"	Nominated	
2008	Guru	"Barso Re"	Won	
2008	Jab We Met	"Yeh Ishq Haye"	Nominated	
2009	Singh Is Kinng	"Teri Ore"	Won	
2009	Bachna Ae Haseeno	"Ahista Ahista"	Nominated	
2010	Rab Ne Bana Di Jodi	"Tujh Mein Rab Dikhta Hai"	Won	
2010	Blue	"Aaj Dil Gustakh Hai"	Nominated	
2011	I Hate Luv Storys	"Bahara" (along with Sona Mohapatra)	Nominated	
2012	Bodyguard	"Teri Meri"	Won	
2012	Shor in the City	"Saibo"	Nominated	
2013	Jab Tak Hai Jaan	"Saans"	Nominated	
2013	Agneepath	"Chikni Chameli"	Nominated	
2015	Heropanti	"Raat Bhar"	Nominated	
2015	Humpty Sharma Ki Dulhania	"Samjhawan"	Nominated	
2015	Happy New Year	"Manwa Laage"	Nominated	
2015	PK	"Chaar Kadam"	Nominated	

== Indian Telly Awards ==
The Indian Telly Awards is an annual award presented by indiantelevision.com group for excellence both on-screen and behind-the-scenes of television in India. Ghoshal has received two awards from seven nominations.

Year	Category	Nominated work	Result	Ref.
2004	Best Title Singer for a TV Show	Ye Meri Life Hai	Won	
2004	Best Title Singer for a TV Show	Kesar	Nominated	
2006	Best Title Singer for a TV Show	Haath Se Haath Mila (along with Sonu Nigam)	Won	
2009	Best Title Singer for a TV Show	STAR Parivaar Awards (along with Shaan)	Nominated	
2012	Best Title Singer for a TV Show	Bade Achhe Lagte Hain	Nominated	
2012	Best Title Singer for a TV Show	Yahaaan Main Ghar Ghar Kheli	Nominated	
2012	Best Judge Panel	X Factor India (along with Sonu Nigam, Sanjay Leela Bhansali)	Nominated	

== Indian Television Academy Awards ==
Shreya Ghoshal has won two Indian Television Academy Awards.

Year	Name	Show	Channel
2004	Shreya Ghoshal	Ye Meri Life Hai	Sony TV
2006	Shreya Ghoshal & Sonu Nigam	Haath Se Haath Mila	DD National

== International Indian Film Academy Awards ==
The International Indian Film Academy Awards are presented annually by the International Indian Film Academy to honour excellence of cinematic achievements in the Hindi language film industry. Ghoshal has received eleven awards from twenty nine nominations. She holds the record of maximum awards and nominations in the Best Female Playback category. She is also the most awarded singer in IIFA's history.

Year	Film	Nominated song	Result	Ref.
2003	Devdas	"Dola Re Dola" (along with Kavita Krishnamurthy)	Won	
2004	Jism	"Jaadu Hai Nasha Hai"	Won	
2006	Parineeta	"Piyu Bole"	Nominated	
2007	Lage Raho Munna Bhai	"Pal Pal Har Pal"	Nominated	
2008	Guru	"Barso Re"	Won	
2008	Jab We Met	"Yeh Ishq Haye"	Nominated	
2008	Saawariya	"Thode Badmash"	Nominated	
2008	Bhool Bhulaiyaa	"Mere Dholna"	Nominated	
2009	Singh Is Kinng	"Teri Ore"	Won	
2010	3 Idiots	"Zoobi Doobi"	Nominated	
2011	I Hate Luv Storys	"Bahara"	Nominated	
2012	Bodyguard	"Teri Meri"	Won	
2012	The Dirty Picture	"Ooh Laa La"	Nominated	
2013	Agneepath	"Chikni Chameli"	Won	
2013	Barfi!	"Aashiyan"	Nominated	
2014	Aashiqui 2	"Sunn Raha Hai"	Won	
2014	Bhaag Milkha Bhaag	"O Rangrez"	Nominated	
2015	Humpty Sharma Ki Dulhania	"Samjhawan"	Nominated	
2016	Bajirao Mastani	"Deewani Mastani"	Nominated	
2019	Padmaavat	"Ghoomar"	Nominated	
2020	Kabir Singh	"Yeh Aaina"	Won	
2022	Atrangi Re	"Chaka Chak"	Nominated	
2022	Mimi	"Param Sundari"	Nominated	
2023	Brahmāstra: Part One – Shiva	"Rasiya"	Won	
2023	Gangubai Kathiawadi	"Jab Saiyaan"	Nominated	
2024	Animal	"Kashmir"	Nominated	
2024	Rocky Aur Rani Kii Prem Kahaani	"Tum Kya Mile"	Nominated	
2025	Bhool Bhulaiyaa 3	"Ami Je Tomar 3.0"	Won	
2025	Laapataa Ladies	"Dheeme Dheeme"	Nominated	
2026	Saiyaara	"Saiyaara Reprise - Female"	Won	

== IIFA Utsavam ==
The IIFA Utsavam, started in 2016, is the South Indian segment of the annual International Indian Film Academy Awards, to honour both artistic and technical excellence of professionals in the South Indian music industry.

=== Kannada ===
Ghoshal has received one award from two nominations.

Year	Film	Nominated song	Result	Ref.
2016	Mr. and Mrs. Ramachari	"Upavaasa"	Won	
2017	Kirik Party	"Neenire Saniha"	Nominated	

=== Malayalam ===
Ghoshal has received one awards from three nominations.

Year	Film	Nominated song	Result	Ref.
2016	Ennu Ninte Moideen	"Kaathirunnu"	Won	
2017	Charlie	"Puthumazhayai"	Nominated	
2024	Ayisha	"Ayisha Ayisha"	Nominated	

=== Telugu ===
Ghoshal has received three nominations.

Year	Film	Nominated song	Result	Ref.
2017	Rudhramadevi	"Punnami Puvvai"	Nominated	
2017	Kanche	"Itu Itu Ani Chitikelu Evvarivo"	Nominated	
2017	Soggade Chinni Nayana	"Nee Navve"	Nominated	

== Indian National Cine Academy Awards ==
The Indian National Cine Academy Awards is an award function organized by The Producers Guild of India to honour filmmakers, producers, writers, actors, technicians, and creative leaders from all Indian film industries.The award started in 2026. Shreya Ghoshal has received three nominations for Best Female Playback Singer.

Year	Song	Film	Language	Result	Ref.
2026	"Lukocheri Khela"	Lawho Gouranger Naam Rey	Bengali	Nominated	
2026	"Bas Ek Dhadak"	Dhadak 2	Hindi	Nominated	
2026	"Saiyaara Reprise - Female"	Saiyaara	Hindi	Won	

== Indian Independent Music Awards ==
The Indian Independent Music Awards is organised by Hungama Artist Aloud recognising the best of independent artists. In 2024, the award is named Indian Music Awards as it includes film, regional and traditional songs.

Year	Category	Song & Album	Result	Ref.
1st Edition (2022)	Best Singer Female (Jury Category)	"Nah Woh Main"	Won	
2nd Edition (2023)	Best Singer Female (Jury Category)	"Pyaar...Ek Tarfaa"	Won	
2024	Best Song -Jury (Film)	"Tum Kya Mile" - Rocky Aur Rani Kii Prem Kahaani	Won	
2024	Best Female Singer - Jury (Independent)	"Qaraar" - Sukoon	Won	
2024	Best Female Singer - Consumer (Film)	"Tum Kya Mile" - Rocky Aur Rani Kii Prem Kahaani	Won	

== Ishq Music Awards ==
Year	Category	Song	Film	Result	Ref.
2021	Voice Of Ishq (Female)	"Param Sundari"	Mimi	Won	
2023	Voice Of Ishq (Female)	"Chaka Chak"	Atrangi Re	Won	
2024	Voice Of Ishq (Female)	"Tum Kya Mile"	Rocky Aur Rani Kii Prem Kahaani	Won	
2024	Best Heart Break Hit	"Ve Kamleya" (along with Arijit Singh & Shadab Faridi)	Rocky Aur Rani Kii Prem Kahaani	Nominated	
2024	Best Bengali Song	"Baundule Ghuri" (along with Arijit Singh	Dawshom Awbotaar	Nominated	

== Just For Women Movie Awards ==
Shreya Ghoshal has received two nominations for "Best Female Playback Singer"

Year	Nominated Song	Film	Result	Ref.
2020	"Anbae Peranbae" "Vaaney Vaaney"	NGK Viswasam	Nominated	
2023	"Ratchasa Maamaney"	Ponniyin Selvan: I	Nominated	

== Kerala State Film Awards ==
The Kerala State Film Award are the film awards for a motion picture made in Kerala. The awards have been bestowed by Kerala State Chalachitra Academy since 1998 on behalf of the Department of Cultural Affairs, Government of Kerala, India. Ghoshal has received four awards.

Year	Film	Nominated song	Result	Ref.
2009	Banaras	"Chaanthu Thottille"	Won	
2011	Veeraputhran	"Kannodu Kannoram"	Won	
2011	Rathinirvedam	"Kannoram Chingaram"	Won	
2014	How Old Are You?	"Vijanathayil"	Won	
2018	Aami	"Neer Mathaalam"	Won	

== Maharashtra State Film Awards ==
The Maharashtra State Film Awards is one of the prestigious awards of Marathi cinema which are awarded by the Government of Maharashtra to Marathi language films and artists. Shreya Ghoshal has received a nomination for Best Female Playback Singer

Year	Film	Nominated song	Result	Ref.
2023	Jhimma 2	"Rang Jarasa Ola"	Nominated	

== Mirchi Music Awards ==
The Mirchi Music Awards are presented annually by Radio Mirchi to honour both artistic and technical excellence of professionals in the Hindi language film music industry of India. Shreya Ghoshal has received 20 awards from 79 nominations in different categories. She has received the award in 10 categories.

=== Female Vocalist Of The Year ===
For the category Female Vocalist Of The Year, Shreya Ghoshal has won eight awards from twenty two nominations.

Year	Song	Film	Result
2008	"Teri Ore"	Singh Is Kinng	Nominated
2009	"Tere Naina"	Chandni Chowk to China	Nominated
2010	"Chori Kiya Re Jiya"	Dabangg	Nominated
2011	"Ooh Laa La"	The Dirty Picture"	Nominated
2012	"Chikni Chameli"	Agneepath	Won
2012	"Saans"	Jab Tak Hai Jaan	Nominated
2013	"Sunn Raha Hai"	Aashiqui 2	Nominated
2014	"Manwa Laage"	Happy New Year	Nominated
2014	"Samjhawan"	Humpty Sharma Ki Dulhania	Nominated
2015	"Mohe Rang Do Laal"	Bajirao Mastani	Won
2015	"Deewani Mastani"	Bajirao Mastani	Nominated
2015	"Pinga" (along with Vaishali Mhade)	Bajirao Mastani	Nominated
2017	"Thodi Der"	Half Girlfriend	Won
2018	"Ghoomar"	Padmaavat	Won
2018	"Dhadak (Title Song)"	Dhadak	Nominated
2019	"Ghar More Pardesiya"	Kalank	Won
2019	"Tabaah Ho Gaye"	Kalank	Nominated
2020-2021	"Chaka Chak"	Atrangi Re	Won
2020-2021	"Tere Rang"	Atrangi Re	Nominated
2020-2021	"Param Sundari"	Mimi	Nominated
2022	"Jab Saiyaan"	Gangubai Kathiawadi	Won
2023	"Tum Kya Mile"	Rocky Aur Rani Kii Prem Kahaani	Nominated

=== Female Vocalist Of The Decade ===
Year	Song	Film	Result
2010-2019	"Mohe Rang Do Laal"	Bajirao Mastani	Won
2010-2019	"Ghoomar"	Padmaavat	Nominated
2010-2019	"Ghar More Pardesiya"	Kalank	Nominated

=== Overall Table ===
Year	Category	Album	Song	Result	Ref.
2008	Female Vocalist of the Year	Singh Is Kinng	"Teri Ore"	Nominated	
2009	Female Vocalist of the Year	Chandni Chowk to China	"Tere Naina"	Nominated	
2010	Female Vocalist of the Year	Dabangg	"Chori Kiya Re Jiya"	Nominated	
2010	Song of the Year	Dabangg	Tere Mast Mast Do Nain	Nominated	
2011	Female Vocalist of the Year	The Dirty Picture	"Ooh La La"	Nominated	
2011	Song of the Year	The Dirty Picture	"Ooh La La"	Nominated	
2011	Best Item Song of the Year	The Dirty Picture	"Ooh La La"	Won	
2012	Female Vocalist of the Year	Agneepath	"Chikni Chameli"	Won	
2012	Female Vocalist of the Year	Jab Tak Hai Jaan	"Saans"	Nominated	
2012	Song of the Year	Student of the Year	"Radha"	Nominated	
2012	Song of the Year	Dabangg 2	"Dagabaaz Re"	Nominated	
2012	Listeners' Choice Song of the Year	Student of the Year	"Radha"	Won	
2012	Raag Inspired Song of the Year	Dabangg 2	"Dagabaaz Re" (along with the musical team of the song)	Nominated	
2012	Raag Inspired Song of the Year	Krishna Aur Kans	"Suno Suno Saanwre Ki" (along with the musical team of the song)	Nominated	
2013	Female Vocalist of the Year	Aashiqui 2	"Sunn Raha Hai"	Nominated	
2014	Female Vocalist of the Year	Humpty Sharma Ki Dulhania	"Samjhawan"	Nominated	
2014	Female Vocalist of the Year	Happy New Year	"Manwa Laage"	Nominated	
2014	Song of the Year	Happy New Year	"Manwa Laage" (along with the musical team of the song)	Nominated	
2015	Female Vocalist of the Year	Bajirao Mastani	"Mohe Rang Do Laal"	Won	
2015	Female Vocalist of the Year	Bajirao Mastani	"Deewani Mastani"	Nominated	
2015	Female Vocalist of the Year	Bajirao Mastani	"Pinga" (along with Vaishali Mhade)	Nominated	
2015	Song of the Year	Bajirao Mastani	"Deewani Mastani" (along with the musical team of the song)	Nominated	
2015	Raag Inspired of the Year	Bajirao Mastani	"Mohe Rang Do Laal" (along with the musical team of the song)	Nominated	
2015	Raag Inspired of the Year	Jaanisaar	"Achchi Surat Pe Ghazab" (along with the musical team of the song)	Nominated	
2016	IndiPop Song of the Year	"Aye Jahaan Aasmaan"	"Aye Jahaan Aasmaan" (along with the musical team of the song)	Won	
2017	Female Vocalist of the Year	Half Girlfriend	"Thodi Der"	Won	
2017	Song of the Year	Badrinath Ki Dulhania	"Aashiq Surrender Hua"	Nominated	
2017	Album of the Year	Tiger Zinda Hai (along with the musical team of the album)	"Daata Tu"	Nominated	
2018	Female Vocalist of the Year	Padmaavat	"Ghoomar"	Won	
2018	Female Vocalist of the Year	Dhadak	"Dhadak (Title Song)"	Nominated	
2018	Song of the Year	Padmaavat	"Ghoomar" (along with the musical team of the song)	Won	
2018	Album of the Year	Padmaavat (along with the musical team of Padmaavat)	Song in the album: "Ghoomar"	Won	
2018	Listener' Choice Album of the Year	Padmaavat (along with the musical team of Padmaavat)	Song in the album: "Ghoomar"	Nominated	
2018	Raag Inspired Song of the Year	Padmaavat	"Ghoomar" (along with the musical team of the song)	Nominated	
2019	Female Vocalist of the Year	Kalank	"Ghar More Pardesiya"	Won	
2019	Female Vocalist of the Year	Kalank	"Tabaah Ho Gaye"	Nominated	
2019	Album of the Year	Bharat (along with the musical team of Bharat)	Song in the album: "Slow Motion"	Nominated	
2019	Album of the Year	Kabir Singh (along with the musical team of Kabir Singh)	Song in the album: "Yeh Aaina"	Nominated	
2019	Album of the Year	Kalank (along with the musical team of Kalank)	Song in the album: "Ghar More Pardesiya" & "Tabaah Ho Gaye"	Nominated	
2019	Recreated Song of the Year	"Hume Tumse Pyaar Kitna"	"Hume Tumse Pyaar Kitna" (along with the musical team of the song)	Won	
2019	Listeners' Choice Song of the Year	Bharat	"Slow Motion"	Nominated	
2019	Listener's Choice Album of the Year	Kabir Singh (along with the musical team of Kabir Singh)	Song in the album: "Yeh Aaina"	Won	
2019	Listener's Choice Album of the Year	Kalank (along with the musical team of Kalank)	Song in the album: "Ghar More Pardesiya" & "Tabaah Ho Gaye"	Nominated	
2019	Listener's Choice Album of the Year	Bharat (along with the musical team of Bharat)	"Song in the album: Slow Motion"	Nominated	
Decade (2010-2019)	Female Vocalist of the Decade	Bajirao Mastani	"Mohe Rang Do Laal"	Won	
Decade (2010-2019)	Female Vocalist of the Decade	Padmaavat	"Ghoomar"	Nominated	
Decade (2010-2019)	Female Vocalist of the Decade	Kalank	"Ghar More Pardesiya"	Nominated	
Decade (2010-2019)	Song of the Decade	Padmaavat	"Ghoomar" (along with the musical team of the song)	Nominated	
Decade (2010-2019)	Album of the Decade	Agneepath (along with the musical team of the album)	Song in the album: "Chikni Chameli"	Nominated	
Decade (2010-2019)	Album of the Decade	Aashiqui 2 (along with the musical team of the album)	Song in the album: "Sunn Raha Hai" (Female Version)	Nominated	
Decade (2010-2019)	Album of the Decade	Bajirao Mastani (along with the musical team of the album)	Song in the album: "Deewani Mastani", "Mohe Rang Do Laal" & "Pinga"	Nominated	
Decade (2010-2019)	Listeners' Choice Album of the Decade	Aashiqui 2 (along with the musical team of the album)	Song in the album: "Sunn Raha Hai" (Female Version)	Won	
Decade (2010-2019)	Listeners' Choice Album of the Decade	Kabir Singh (along with the musical team of the album)	Song in the album: "Yeh Aaina"	Nominated	
2020-2021	Female Vocalist of the Year	Atrangi Re	"Chaka Chak"	Won	
2020-2021	Female Vocalist of the Year	Atrangi Re	"Tere Rang"	Nominated	
2020-2021	Female Vocalist of the Year	Mimi	"Param Sundari"	Nominated	
2020-2021	Song of the Year	Atrangi Re	"Chaka Chak" (along with the musical team of the song)	Nominated	
2020-2021	Album of the Year	Atrangi Re (along with the musical team of Atrangi Re)	Song in the album: "Chaka Chak" & "Tere Rang"	Nominated	
2020-2021	Album of the Year	Dil Bechara (along with the musical team of Dil Bechara)	Song in the album: "Taare Ginn"	Nominated	
2020-2021	Listeners' Choice Song of the Year	Atrangi Re	"Chaka Chak" (along with the musical team of the song)	Won	
2020-2021	Listener's Choice Album of the Year	Atrangi Re (along with the musical team of Atrangi Re)	Song in the album: "Chaka Chak" & "Tere Rang"	Won	
2020-2021	Listener's Choice Album of the Year	Dil Bechara (along with the musical team of Dil Bechara)	Song in the album: "Taare Ginn"	Nominated	
2020-2021	Indie Song of the Year	Songs of Love	"Lagan Laagi Re" (along with the musical team of the song)	Nominated	
2020-2021	Indie Song of the Year	"Mann Bheetar"	"Bhari Bhari" (along with the musical team of the song)	Nominated	
2022	Female Vocalist Of The Year	Gangubai Kathiawadi	"Jab Saiyaan"	Won	
2022	Song Of The Year	Gangubai Kathiawadi	"Jab Saiyaan" (along with the musical team of the song)	Nominated	
2022	Album Of The Year	Brahmāstra: Part One – Shiva (along with the musical team of the album)	Song in the album: "Rasiya"	Nominated	
2022	Album Of The Year	Gangubai Kathiawadi (along with the musical team of the album)	Song in the album: "Jab Saiyaan"	Nominated	
2022	Listener's Choice -Album Of The Year	Brahmāstra: Part One – Shiva (along with the musical team of the album)	Song in the album: "Rasiya"	Not Awarded	
2022	Listener's Choice -Album Of The Year	Gangubai Kathiawadi (along with the musical team of the album)	Song in the album: "Jab Saiyaan"	Not Awarded	
2022	Listener's Choice - Indie Song Of The Year	"Baarish Aayi Hai" (along with the musical team of the song)		Not Awarded	
2023	Female Vocalist Of The Year	Rocky Aur Rani Kii Prem Kahaani	"Tum Kya Mile"	Nominated	
2023	Album Of The Year	Tu Jhoothi Main Makkar (along with the musical team of the album)	Song in the album: "Maine Pi Rakhi Hai"	Won	
2023	Album Of The Year	Animal (along with the musical team of the album)	Song in the album: "Kashmir"	Nominated	
2023	Album Of The Year	Rocky Aur Rani Kii Prem Kahaani (along with the musical team of the album)	Song in the album: "Tum Kya Mile" & "Ve Kamleya"	Nominated	
2023	Listener's Album Of The Year	Animal (along with the musical team of the album)	Song in the album: "Kashmir"	Won	
2023	Listener's Album Of The Year	Rocky Aur Rani Kii Prem Kahaani (along with the musical team of the album)	Song in the album: "Tum Kya Mile" & Ve "Kamleya"	Nominated	
2023	Listener's Album Of The Year	Tu Jhoothi Main Makkar (along with the musical team of the album)	Song in the album: "Maine Pi Rakhi Hai"	Nominated	
2023	Listener's Choice Indie Song Of The Year		"Guli Mata" (along with the musical team of the song)	Nominated	

== Mirchi Music Awards Bangla ==
The Mirchi Music Awards Bangla is the Bengali segment of the annual Mirchi Music Awards, presented by Radio Mirchi to honour both artistic and technical excellence of professionals in the Bengali language film music industry of India. Ghoshal has received seven awards from nineteen nominations.

Year	Category	Album	Nominated song	Result	Ref.
2011	Film Female Vocalist of the Year	Jaani Dyakha Hawbe	"Jaani Dekha Hobe"	Won	
2012	Film Female Vocalist of the Year	Aparajita Tumi	"Roopkathara"	Won	
2012	Film Female Vocalist of the Year	Aparajita Tumi	"Bristi Biday"	Nominated	
2012	Song of the Year	Aparajita Tumi	"Roopkathara" (along with Shantanu Moitra)	Won	
2012	Adhunik Female Vocalist of the Year	Mon Kemoner Station	"Daekho"	Nominated	
2012	Adhunik Female Vocalist of the Year	Mon Kemoner Station	"Ja Khushi Shara Ta Din"	Nominated	
2012	Adhunik Female Vocalist of the Year	Mon Kemoner Station	"Bandhu Kotha Rakhish"	Nominated	
2013	Film Female Vocalist of the Year	Proloy	"Haath Dhoreche Gaacher Paata"	Nominated	
2014	Film Female Vocalist of the Year	Buno Haansh	"Bela Boye Jae"	Won	
2014	Film Female Vocalist of the Year	Buno Haansh	"Esheche Raat"	Nominated	
2015	Film Female Vocalist of the Year	Shudhu Tomari Jonyo	"Shudhu Tomari Jonyo"	Nominated	
2015	Film Female Vocalist of the Year	Katmundu	"Eto Alo"	Won	
2016	Film Female Vocalist of the Year	Tobu Aporichito	"Khub Chena Mukh"	Won	
2016	Film Song of the Year	Praktan	"Kolkata" (along with Anupam Roy)	Nominated	
2017	Listener's Choice Song of the Year	The Bongs Again	"Tomaye Hrid Majhare Rakhbo"	Nominated	
2018	Female Vocalist of the Year	Ek Je Chhilo Raja	"Esho Hey"	Nominated	
2021	Female Vocalist of the Decade	Aparajita Tumi	"Roopkathara"	Won	
2023	Female Vocalist Of The Year	Dharmajuddha	"Tumi Jodi Chao"	Nominated	
2023	Female Vocalist Of The Year	X=Prem	"Bhalobashar Morshum"	Nominated	
2023	Album Of The Year	Belashuru (along with the musical team of the album)	Song in the album: "Ki Mayay"	Won	
2023	Album Of The Year	Bismillah (along with the musical team of the album)	Song in the album: "Keno Je Tomakey"	Nominated	
2023	Listeners' Choice - Album Of The Year	X=Prem (along with the musical team of the album)	Song in the album: "Bhalobashar Morshum"	Won	
2023	Listeners' Choice - Album Of The Year	Belashuru (along with the musical team of the album)	Song in the album: "Ki Mayay"	Nominated	
2023	Listeners' Choice - Song Of The Year	X=Prem	"Bhalobashar Morshum (Female)" (along with the musical team of the song)	Won	
2024	Album Of The Year	Dawshom Awbotaar (along with the musical team of the album)	Song in the album: "Baundule Ghuri"	Won	
2024	Listeners' Choice Song Of The Year	Dawshom Awbotaar	"Baundule Ghuri" (along with the musical team of the song)	Won	
2024	Listeners' Choice Album Of The Year	Dawshom Awbotaar (along with the musical team of the album)	Song in the album: "Baundule Ghuri"	Nominated	

== Mirchi Music Awards Marathi ==
The Mirchi Music Awards Marathi is the Marathi segment of the annual Mirchi Music Awards, started in 2014, presented by Radio Mirchi to honour both artistic and technical excellence of professionals in the Marathi music industry. Ghoshal has received four awards from seventeen nominations.

Year	Category	Film	Nominated song	Result	Ref.
2014	Female Vocalist of the Year	Lai Bhaari	"Ye Na Saajna"	Nominated	
2015	Female Vocalist of the Year	Nilkanth Master	"Adhir Man Jhale"	Won	
2015	Female Vocalist of the Year	Nilkanth Master	"Partuni Yena"	Nominated	
2016	Female Vocalist of the Year	Sairat	"Atach Baya Ka Baavarla"	Nominated	
2016	Female Vocalist of the Year	Kaul Manacha	"Man Manjiri"	Nominated	
2016	Song of the Year	Sairat	"Atach Baya Ka Baavarla" (along with Ajay–Atul)	Nominated	
2017	Film Female Vocalist of the Year	Karaar	"Sajana Re"	Nominated	
2017	Film Album of the Year	Karaar (along with the whole musical team)		Nominated	
2018	Film Female Vocalist of the Year	Majha Agadbam	"Haluwara"	Nominated	
2018	Film Album of the Year	Bucket List (along with the whole musical team)		Nominated	
2018	Film Album of the Year	Mauli (along with the whole musical team)		Nominated	
2018	Listener's Choice Album of the Year	Bucket List (along with the whole musical team)		Nominated	
2018	Listener's Choice Album of the Year	Mauli (along with the whole musical team)		Nominated	
2021	Film Female Vocalist of the Decade	Nilkanth Master	"Adhir Mann Jhale"	Won	
2021	Film Album of the Decade	Sairat (along with the musical team of the album)	Song in the album: "Aatach Baya Ka Baavarla"	Won	
2022	Film Album of the Year	Prawaas (along with the musical team of the album)	Song in the album: "Prawaas (Reprise)"	Nominated	
2022	Listener's Choice Album of the Year	Prawaas (along with the musical team of the album)	Song in the album: "Prawaas (Reprise)"	Won	

== Mirchi Music Awards Punjabi ==
The Mirchi Music Awards Punjabi is the Punjabi segment of the annual Mirchi Music Awards, started in 2014, presented by Radio Mirchi to honour both artistic and technical excellence of professionals in the Punjabi music industry. Ghoshal has received a nomination.

Year	Category	Film	Nominated song	Result	Ref.
2014	Female Vocalist of the Year	Dil Vil Pyaar Vyaar	"Tere Ishq Ne"	Nominated	

== Mirchi Music Awards South ==
The Mirchi Music Awards South is the South Indian segment of the annual Mirchi Music Awards, started in 2010 by Radio Mirchi to honour both artistic and technical excellence of professionals in the South Indian music industry. Ghoshal has received seven awards from thirty-one nominations in several categories.

=== Kannada ===
Ghoshal has received three awards from fourteen nominations.

Year	Category	Film	Nominated song	Result	Ref.
2009	Female Vocalist Of The Year	Manasaare	"Na Naguva Modalene"	Won	
2010	Female Vocalist Of The Year	Paramathma	"Thanmayalaadenu"	Nominated	
2011	Female Vocalist Of The Year	Sanju Weds Geetha	"Gaganave Baagi"	Won	
2012	Female Vocalist Of The Year	Romeo	"Aalochane"	Nominated	
2013	Female Vocalist Of The Year	Myna	"Modala Maleyante"	Won	
2013	Female Vocalist Of The Year	Bachchan	"Sadaa Ninna Kannali"	Nominated	
2014	Female Vocalist Of The Year	Ulidavaru Kandanthe	"Kaakig Banna Kantha"	Nominated	
2016	Female Vocalist Of The Year	Ishtakamya	"Nee Nanagoskara"	Nominated	
2016	Female Vocalist Of The Year	Ishtakamya	"Thangali"	Nominated	
2016	Female Vocalist Of The Year	Kirik Party	"Neenire Saniha"	Nominated	
2016	Female Vocalist Of The Year	Kotigobba 2	"Saaluthillave"	Nominated	
2016	Female Vocalist Of The Year	Mungaru Male 2	"Kanasalu"	Nominated	
2020	Female Vocalist Of The Decade	Sanju Weds Geetha	"Gaganave Baagi"	Nominated	
2020	Female Vocalist Of The Decade	Myna	"Modala Maleyante"	Nominated	

=== Malayalam ===
Ghoshal has received two awards from ten nominations.

Year	Category	Film	Nominated song	Result	Ref.
2009	Female Vocalist Of The Year	Banaras	"Chandhu Thottille"	Won	
2011	Female Vocalist Of The Year	Pranayam	"Paattil Ee Paattil"	Won	
2011	Female Vocalist Of The Year	Rathinirvedam	"Kannoram Chinkaram"	Nominated	
2011	Female Vocalist Of The Year	Veeraputhran	"Kannodu Kannoram"	Nominated	
2011	Female Vocalist Of The Year	Khaddama	"Vidhuramee Yathra"	Nominated	
2014	Female Vocalist Of The Year	Mylanchi Monchulla Veedu	"Wahida" (Female Version)	Nominated	
2014	Female Vocalist Of The Year	How Old Are You?	"Vijanathayil"	Nominated	
2015	Female Vocalist Of The Year	Charlie	"Puthumazhayayi"	Nominated	
2017	Female Vocalist Of The Year	Ramante Edanthottam	"Akale Oru Kaadinte"	Nominated	
2020	Female Vocalist Of The Decade	Pranayam	"Paattil Ee Paattil"	Nominated	

=== Tamil ===
Ghoshal has received an award from four nominations.

Year	Category	Film	Nominated song	Result	Ref.
2013	Song of the Year	Kumki	"Sollitaley Ava Kaadhala" (along with K. G. Ranjjth, Yugabharathi & D. Imman)	Nominated	
2013	Song of the Year – Listener's Choice	Kumki	"Sollitaley Ava Kaadhala" (along with K. G. Ranjjth, Yugabharathi & D. Imman)	Won	
2016	Female vocalist of the Year	Rekka	"Kanna Kaattu Podhum"	Nominated	
2016	Female vocalist of the Year	Thodari	"Oorellam Kekkude"	Nominated	
2019	Female vocalist of the Year	Viswasam	"Vaaney Vaaney"	Nominated	
2019	Female vocalist of the Year	Namma Veettu Pillai	"Mailaanji Mailaanji"	Nominated	
2020 & 2021	Best Female Singer	Annaatthe	"Saara Kaattrae"	Nominated	

=== Telugu ===
Ghoshal has received multiple awards multiple nominations.

Year	Category	Film	Nominated song	Result	Ref.
2009	Song of the Year (Critics Choice)	Konchem Istam Konchem Kastam	"Aanandhama" (Along With Shankar Mahadevan, Sirivennela Seetharama Sastry & Shankar–Ehsaan–Loy)	Won	
2009	Album of the Year (Critics Choice)	Konchem Istam Konchem Kastam	(along with the musical team of Konchem Istam Konchem Kastam)	Won	
2010	Album of the Year	Puli	(along with the musical team of Puli)	Nominated	
2011	Female vocalist of the Year	Mr. Perfect	"Chali Chaliga"	Won	
2011	Song of the Year	Sri Rama Rajyam	"Jagadhanandha Karaka" (along with S. P. Balasubrahmanyam, Jonnavittula Ramalingeswara Rao & Ilaiyaraaja)	Won	
2011	Album of the Year	Sri Rama Rajyam	(along with the musical team of Sri Rama Rajyam)	Won	
2012	Female vocalist of the Year	Krishnam Vande Jagadgurum	"Sye Andre Naanu"	Nominated	
2012	Album of the Year	Krishnam Vande Jagadgurum	(along with the musical team of Krishnam Vande Jagadgurum)	Nominated	
2013	Female vocalist of the Year	Sukumarudu	"Neelakashamlo"	Nominated	
2014	Female vocalist of the Year	Yevadu	"Nee Jathaga"	Nominated	
2014	Female vocalist of the Year	Manam	"Chinni Chinni Aasalu"	Nominated	
2014	Song of the Year	Manam	"Chinni Chinni Aasalu" (along with S. Thaman, Chandrabose)	Nominated	
2014	Album of the Year	Manam	(along with the musical team of Manam)	Nominated	
2014	Album of the Year	Race Gurram	(along with the musical team of Manam)	Nominated	
2014	Album of the Year (Listeners Choice)	Race Gurram	(along with the musical team of Manam)	Nominated	
2015	Female Vocalist of the Year	Rudhramadevi	"Punnami Puvvai"	Nominated	
2015	Female Vocalist of the Year	Kanche	"Nijamenani"	Nominated	
2015	Album of the Year	Kanche	(along with the musical team of Kanche	Nominated	
2015	Song of the Year	Kanche	"Itu Itu Ani Chitikelu Evvarivo" (along with Abhay Jodhpurkar, Sirivennela Seetharama Sastry & Chirrantan Bhatt)	Nominated	
2016	Female Vocalist of the Year	Oka Manasu	"O Manasa"	Nominated	
2019	Female Vocalist of the Year	Sye Raa Narasimha Reddy	"Sye Raa Title Song"(Along With Sunidhi Chauhan	Nominated	
2021	Female Vocalist of the Decade	Mr. Perfect	"Chali Chaliga"	Won	
2021	Song of the Decade	Sri Rama Rajyam	"Jagadananada Karaka" (along with S. P. Balasubrahmanyam, Jonnavittula Ramalingeswara Rao & Ilaiyaraaja)	Nominated	

== Mazhavil Music Awards ==
Year	Category	Song	Film	Result	Ref.
2018	Best Female Singer	"Paalthira Paadum"	Captain	Nominated	
2019	Best Female Singer	"Maanam"	Odiyan	Nominated	
2019	Best Duet	"Kondoram" (along with Sudeep Kumar)	Odiyan	Nominated	
2021	Best Female Singer	"Mukkuthi"	Mamangam	Nominated	

== MaTa Sanman ==
The MaTa Sanman or MaTa Awards are presented by the Maharashtra Times to felicitate significant contribution of individuals to Marathi cinema. Shreya Ghoshal has won two awards.

Year	Nominated Song	Film	Result	Ref.
2012	"Ha Natyancha Khel Andhala"	Aarambh	Won	
2016	"Sobane Soyanire"	Carry On Maratha	Nominated	
2017	"Aatach Baya Ka Baavarla"	Sairat	Nominated	
2018	"Man He"	Chi Va Chi Sau Ka	Nominated	
2023	"Chandra"	Chandramukhi	Won	
2024	"Rang Jarasa Ola"	Jhimma 2	Nominated	
2025	"Jahir Jhala Jagala"	Yek Number	Nominated	

== Maharashtracha Favourite Kon ==
The Maharashtracha Favourite Kon? are presented by the Marathi television channel Zee Talkies to honour excellence in Marathi cinema. Ghoshal has received three awards from seven nominations.

Year	Category	Song	Film	Result	Ref.
2015	Favourite Female Playback Singer	"Mohini"	Double Seat	Nominated	
2016	Favourite Female Playback Singer	"Aatach Baya Ka Baavarla"	Sairat	Won	
2018	Favourite Female Playback Singer	"Houn Jau Dya" (along with Sadhana Sargam)	Bucket List	Nominated	
2021	Favourite Female Playback Singer Of The Decade	"Aatach Baya Ka Baavarla"	Sairat	Nominated	
2022	Favourite Female Playback Singer	"Chandra"	Chandramukhi	Won	
2023	Favourite Female Playback Singer	"Sukh Kalale"	Ved	Won	
2023	Favourite Female Playback Singer	"Baharla Ha Madhumas"	Maharashtra Shahir	Nominated	

== Majja Digital Awards (Films) ==
Year	Category	Song	Film	Result	Ref.
2018	Best Female Playback Singer	"Roj Roj Navyane"	Deva	Nominated	
2021	Outstanding Music (Female Playback Singer)	"Navasa Ishara"	Bonus	Won	
2023	Outstanding Music (Female Playback Singer)	"Chandra"	Chandramukhi	Nominated	

== National Film Awards ==
The National Film Awards is the most prestigious film award ceremony in India. The awards are organised and given by the Directorate of Film Festivals (DFF), merged in 2022 with the National Film Development Corporation of India (NFDC), under the Ministry of Information and Broadcasting (MIB) and are presented annually by the President of India in Delhi.

Shreya Ghoshal has won the award five times for Best Female Playback Singer. She is the second-most frequent recipient. She is the only singer to have won the award for her work in five different languages. Additionally, she is the only singer to have won the award for two songs from two different films in two different languages in the same year.

Year	Film	Language of the Film	Song	Citation	Ref.
2002	Devdas	Hindi	"Bairi Piya"	"For her soulful rendering of the song."	
2005	Paheli	Hindi	"Dheere Jalna"	"For her evocative rendition of a song that treads the fine balance between the classical and popular genre of Hindi film music."	
2007	Jab We Met	Hindi	"Yeh Ishq Hai"	"For her mellifluous voice and rich tonal quality. Her rendition evokes the beauty of nature through its subtle nuances."	
2008	Antaheen	Bengali	"Pherari Mon"	"For her wide ranging rendition of human emotions."	
2008	Jogwa	Marathi	"Jeev Rangla"	"For her wide ranging rendition of human emotions."	
2021	Iravin Nizhal	Tamil	"Maayava Thooyava / Maayava Chaayava"	"For her melodious expression about the magic of love and longing."	

== Norway Tamil Film Festival Awards ==
Shreya Ghoshal has bagged one award for Best Female Playback Singer. Nomination is not announced.

Year	Song	Film	Result	Ref.
2018	"Neethanae"	Mersal	Won	

== Power Brands Bollywood Film Journalist's Awards ==
Power Brands Bollywood Film Journalists Awards aim to be India’s first no frills, absolutely transparent Bollywood Awards where selection is based upon voting only by film journalists. Shreya Ghoshal has won two awards for Best Singer - Female.

Year	Nominated Song	Film	Result	Ref.
2022	"Param Sundari"	Mimi	Won	
2023	"Jab Saiyaan"	Gangubai Kathiawadi	Won	

== RMIM Puraskaar ==
The RMIM Puraskaar borrows its name from the news group rec.music.Indian.misc, the oldest community of Hindi Film Music lovers on the net. These awards voice the opinion of HFM listeners scattered all over the Internet including on forums, groups, blogs, and social networks. Shreya Ghoshal has won 25 awards from 59 nominations in different categories till date. She has been chosen 13 times as the 'Female Singer Of The Year'.

=== Female Singer of the Year ===
Shreya Ghoshal has won 13 awards for Female Singer of the Year

Year	Film	Result	Ref
2007	For overall performance during the year	Won	
2008	For overall performance during the year	Won	
2009	For overall performance during the year	Won	
2011	For overall performance during the year	Won	
2012	For overall performance during the year	Won	
2014	For overall performance during the year	Won	
2015	For overall performance during the year	Won	
2019	For overall performance during the year	Won	
2020	For overall performance during the year	Won	
2021	For overall performance during the year	Won	
2022	For overall performance during the year	Won	
2023	For overall performance during the year	Won	
2024	For overall performance during the year	Won	

=== Singer of the Decade ===
Year	Point	Result	Ref
2010-2019	139 points in 55 songs	Nominated	

=== Song of the Year ===
Year	Song	Film	Result	Ref
2021	"Tere Rang"	Atrangi Re	Won	

=== Best Sung Song (Solo) ===
Year	Song	Film	Result	Ref
2015	"Deewani Mastani"	Bajirao Mastani	Nominated	
2017	"Rozana"	Naam Shabana	Nominated	
2019	"Yeh Aaina"	Kabir Singh	Nominated	
2019	"Kathai Kathai"	Malaal	Nominated	
2021	"Param Sundari"	Mimi	Nominated	
2022	"Bol"	PS1	Nominated	
2022	"Jab Saiyaan"	Gangubai Kathiawadi	Nominated	
2023	"Nauka Doobi"	Lost	Nominated	
2024	"Dheeme Dheeme"	Laapataa Ladies	Won	
2024	"Ami Je Tomar 3.0"	Bhool Bhulaiyaa 3	Nominated	
2024	"Angaaron (The Couple Song)"	Pushpa 2: The Rule	Nominated	

=== Best Sung Song (Duet) ===
Year	Song	Film	Result	Ref
2008	"Teri Ore" (with Rahat Fateh Ali Khan)	Singh Is Kinng	Nominated	
2008	"Haal-e-Dil" (with Rahat Fateh Ali Khan)	Haal-e-Dil	Nominated	
2009	"Meethi Meethi Baatein" (with Shaan)	Morning Walk	Nominated	
2011	"Kaun Si Dor" (with Chhannulal Mishra)	Aarakshan	Won	
2011	"Saibo" (with Tochi Raina)	Shor in the City	Nominated	
2011	"Ooh La La" (with Bappi Lahiri)	The Dirty Picture	Nominated	
2012	"Aashiyan" (with Nikhil Paul George)	Barfi!	Won	
2013	"O Rangrez" (with Javed Bashir)	Bhaag Milkha Bhaag	Nominated	
2014	"Tu" (with Papon)	Bobby Jasoos	Nominated	
2015	"Mohe Rang Do Laal" (with Pandit Birju Maharaj)	Bajirao Mastani	Won	
2015	"Champayi Rang Yaar Aajaye" (with Shafqat Ali Khan)	Jaanisaar	Nominated	
2015	"Pinga" (with Vaishali Mhade)	Bajirao Mastani	Nominated	
2016	"Tere Bin" (with Sonu Nigam)	Wazir	Nominated	
2018	"Sarphiri" (with Babul Supriyo)	Laila Majnu	Nominated	
2019	"Jugraafiya" (with Udit Narayan)	Super 30	Nominated	
2019	"Sapna Hai Sach Hai" (with Abhay Jodhpurkar)	Panipat	Nominated	

=== Best Sung Song (Group) ===
Year	Song	Film	Result	Ref
2008	"Sakhiyaan" (with Mahalakshmi Iyer, Sunidhi Chauhan, Richa Sharma)	Pranali	Nominated	

=== Best Sung Song (Duet or Group) ===
2020 onwards

Year	Song	Film	Result	Ref
2020	"Taare Ginn" (with Mohit Chauhan)	Dil Bechara	Nominated	
2021	"Tere Rang" (with Haricharan)	Atrangi Re	Won	
2021	"Ratti Ratti Reza Reza" (with Abhay Jodhpurkar)	Meenakshi Sundareshwar	Nominated	
2023	"Itni Si Baat" (with Sonu Nigam)	Sam Bahadur	Nominated	
2023	"Bolo Na" (with Shaan)	12th Fail	Nominated	
2023	"Veera Raja Veera" (with Kavita Krishnamurti & Arman Dehlvi)	Ponniyin Selvan: II	Nominated	

=== Non-Film Song of the Year ===
(Independent)

Year	Song	Album	Result	Ref
2024	"Re Mann"	Coke Studio Bharat S2	Won	

=== Best Sung Non-Film Song ===
Year	Song-Album	Result	Ref
2021	"Angana Morey"	Won	
2021	"Lagan Laagi Re" - Songs of Love (with Amit Trivedi and Kavita Seth)	Nominated	
2022	"Qaraar" - Sukoon	Nominated	
2024	"Re Mann" - Coke Studio Bharat S2 (with Swanand Kirkire)	Nominated	
2024	"Chaudhavi Shab" - Heeramandi	Nominated	
2024	"Chhaila" - Bhoomi 2024 (with Sunidhi Chauhan)	Nominated	

=== Satish Kalra Sammaan/RMIM Sammaan ===
"Hall of Excellence"

Year	Film	Result	Ref
2012	Barfi!	Won	
2015	Bajirao Mastani	Won	
2020	Dil Bechara	Won	
2021	Atrangi Re	Won	

== Radio City Cine Awards ==
Shreya Ghoshal has won two awards from many nominations.

=== Radio City Cine Awards Marathi ===
Best Singer - Female

Year	Song	Film	Result	Ref.
2018	"Man He"	Chi Va Chi Sau Ka	Nominated	
2019	"Houn Jau Dya", "Tu Pari"	Bucket List	Nominated	
2021	"Navasa Ishara"	Bonus	Won	
2021	"Prawaas (Reprise)"	Prawaas	Nominated	
2023	"Chandra"	Chandramukhi	Won	
2024	"Baharla Ha Madhumas"	Maharashtra Shahir	Nominated	

=== Other Languages ===
Year	Song	Film	Language	Result	Ref.
2017	"Kanasalu"	Mungaru Male 2	Kannada	Nominated	
2017	"Mirutha Mirutha" (and 7 other songs)	Miruthan	Tamil	Won	
2017	"Ekimeedaa" "You And Me" "Emo Emo" "Sukhibhave Annara"	Gautamiputra Satakarni Khaidi No. 150 Katamarayudu Nene Raju Nene Mantri	Telugu	Nominated	
2018	"Neethanae"	Mersal	Tamil	Nominated	
2019	"Ommomme Nannannu"	Kannadakkaagi Ondannu Otti	Kannada	Nominated	
2019	"Mandaara"	Bhaagamathie	Telugu	Nominated	

== Screen Awards ==
The Screen Awards honour excellence of cinematic achievements in the Hindi film industry. Ghoshal has won eight awards from twenty two nominations. She holds the record of maximum awards in Best Female Playback category.

Year	Film	Nominated song	Result	Ref.
2003	Devdas	"Silsila Yeh Chahat Ka"	Nominated	
2004	Jism	"Jaadu Hai Nasha Hai"	Won	
2006	Parineeta	"Piyu Bole"	Won	
2006	Yahaan	"Naam Adaa Likhna"	Nominated	
2007	Omkara	"O Saathi Re"	Nominated	
2008	Guru	"Barso Re"	Won	
2008	Jab We Met	"Yeh Ishq Haye"	Nominated	
2009	Singh Is Kinng	"Teri Ore"	Nominated	
2010	3 Idiots	"Zoobi Doobi"	Nominated	
2011	I Hate Luv Storys	"Bahara"	Won	
2011	My Name Is Khan	"Noor E Khuda"	Nominated	
2012	The Dirty Picture	"Ooh Laa La"	Won	
2013	Student of the Year	"Radha"	Nominated	
2014	Aashiqui 2	"Sunn Raha Hai"	Won	
2017	Half Girlfriend	"Thodi Der"	Nominated	
2018	Padmaavat	"Ghoomar"	Nominated	
2019	Kalank	"Ghar More Pardesiya" (along with Vaishali Mhade)	Won	
2019	Kalank	"Tabaah Ho Gaye"	Nominated	
2019	Kabir Singh	"Yeh Aaina"	Nominated	
2019	Panipat	"Sapna Hai Sach Hai"	Nominated	
2026	Saiyaara	"Saiyaara Reprise - Female"	Won	
2026	Metro... In Dino	"Qayde Se - Rewind"	Nominated	

== South Indian International Movie Awards ==
The South Indian International Movie Awards, also known as the SIIMA Awards, started in 2012, rewards the artistic and technical achievements of the South Indian film industry. Ghoshal received has received thirty nominations, winning one award.

=== Kannada ===
Ghoshal has received 6 nominations.

Year	Film	Nominated song	Result	Ref.
2013	Chingari	"Gamanava"	Nominated	
2015	Ambareesha	"Kannale"	Nominated	
2017	Kirik Party	"Neenire Saniha"	Nominated	
2018	Mugulu Nage	"Ninna Snehadinda"	Nominated	
2020	Kiss	"Neene Modalu"	Nominated	
2022	Roberrt	"Kannu Hodiyaka"	Nominated	

=== Malayalam ===
Ghoshal has received 6 nominations.

Year	Film	Nominated song	Result	Ref.
2013	Chattakkari	"Nilave Nilave"	Nominated	
2015	How Old Are You?	"Vijanathayil"	Nominated	
2016	Ennu Ninte Moideen	"Kaathirunnu"	Nominated	
2017	10 Kalpanakal	"Rithu Shalabhame"	Nominated	
2019	Aami	"Neermathalam"	Nominated	
2024	King of Kotha	"Kalapakkaara"	Nominated	

=== Telugu ===
Ghoshal has received one award for Best Female Playback Singer from 12 nominations.

Year	Film	Nominated song	Result	Ref.
2012	Mr. Perfect	"Chali Chaliga"	Won	
2013	Krishnam Vande Jagadgurum	"Sai Andri Nanu Sai Antira"	Nominated	
2014	Naayak	"Hey Naayak"	Nominated	
2015	Manam	"Chinni Chinni Aasalu"	Nominated	
2015	Yevadu	"Nee Jathaga Nenundali"	Nominated	
2016	Kanche	"Nijamenani Nammani"	Nominated	
2019	Tholi Prema	"Allasani Vari"	Nominated	
2020	Sye Raa Narasimha Reddy	"Sye Raa" (along with Sunidhi Chauhan)	Nominated	
2021	V	"Vastunna Vachestunna"	Nominated	
2022	Uppena	"Jala Jala Jalapatham Nuvvu"	Nominated	
2025	Pushpa 2: The Rule	"Sooseki"	Nominated	
2026	Thandel	"Hilesso Hilessa"	Nominated	

=== Tamil ===
Ghoshal has received 8 nominations.

Year	Film	Nominated song	Result	Ref.
2013	Kumki	"Sollitaley Ava Kaadhala"	Nominated	
2015	Kayal	"Yen Aala Pakkaporen"	Nominated	
2016	I	Pookkalae Sattru Oyivedungal	Nominated	
2017	Miruthan	"Mirutha Mirutha"	Nominated	
2018	Mersal	"Neethanae"	Nominated	
2020	NGK	"Anbae Peranbae"	Nominated	
2022	Annaatthe	"Saara Kaattrae"	Nominated	
2023	Iravin Nizhal	"Maayava Thooyava"	Nominated	

== Sanskruti Kaladarpan Marathi Awards ==
Year	Nominated Song	Film	Result	Ref.
2016	"Adhir Man Zhale"	Nilkanth Master	Nominated	
2022	"Prawaas (Reprise)"	Prawaas	Nominated	
2024	"Baharla Ha Madhumas"	Maharashtra Shahir	Pending	

== SSE Live Awards ==
The SSE Live Awards were started by SSE plc in 2015 to honour the best act/concert of the Year at each of their arenas viz SSE Hydro Glasgow, SSE Arena Belfast and SSE Arena Wembley. The winners are decided by the online public voting on SSE Rewards.

Year	Category	Concert venue	Result	Ref.
2017	Best Act of the Year	The SSE Arena, Wembley	Nominated	
2018	Best Solo Artist	The SSE Arena, Wembley	Won	

== Tamil Nadu State Film Awards ==
The Tamil Nadu State Film Awards are the most prestigious film awards given for Tamil films in India. They are given annually to honour the best talents and provide encouragement and incentive to the South Indian film industry by the Government of Tamil Nadu. Ghoshal has received two awards.

Year	Film	Nominated song	Result	Ref.
2006	Sillunu Oru Kaadhal	"Munbe Vaa"	Won	
2012	Kumki	"Sollitaley Ava Kaadhala"	Won	

== Telangana Gaddar Film Awards ==
The Telangana Gaddar Film Awards are given by the government of Telangana. The award was started in 2025, awarding the best of 2024. The award was formerly called the Nandi Awards. Shreya Ghoshal has received an award for the Best Female Playback Singer.

Year	Film	Song	Result	Ref.
2024	Pushpa 2: The Rule	"Sooseki"	Won	

== Times of India Film Awards ==
The Times of India Film Awards are presented by The Times of India to honour both artistic and technical excellence of professionals in the Hindi language film industry of India. The award was first held in 2013, then in 2016. Ghoshal has received an award from four nominations.

Year	Film	Nominated song	Result	Ref.
2013	Barfi!	"Aashiyan"	Nominated	
2016	Bajirao Mastani	"Deewani Mastani"	Nominated	
2016	Bajirao Mastani	"Pinga" (along with Vaishali Mhade)	Nominated	
2016	Bajirao Mastani	"Mohe Rang Do Laal"	Won	
2025	Crakk	"Dil Jhoom"	Nominated	

== Vanitha Film Awards ==
The Vanitha Film Awards are presented annually by Vanitha, an Indian magazine from the Malayala Manorama group in the south Indian state of Kerala. The awards ceremony has been instituted to honour both artistic and technical excellence in the Malayalam language film industry. Held and broadcast annually since 1998. Shreya Ghoshal won five awards in two-different categories.

Year	Category	Album	Nominated song	Result	Ref.
2011	Best Female Playback Singer	Anwar	"Kizhakku Pookkum"	Won	
2015	Best Female Playback Singer	How Old Are You?	"Vijanathayil"	Won	
2019	Best Female Playback Singer	Odiyan	"Maanam"	Won	
2019	Best Duet	Odiyan	"Kondoram" (along with Sudeep Kumar)	Won	
2020	Best Female Playback Singer	Mamangam	"Mukkuthi"	Won	

== Vijay Awards ==
The Vijay Awards are presented by the Tamil television channel STAR Vijay to honour excellence in Tamil cinema. It has been given annually since 2007. The awards are decided by a jury, consisting of noted film-makers, critics and technicians. Shreya Ghoshal has won one award for Best Female Playback Singer.

Year	Song	Fim	Result	Ref.
2008	"Nannare"	Guru	Nominated	
2009	"Thaen Thaen Thaen"	Kuruvi	Nominated	
2010	"Oru Vetkam Varudhe"	Pasanga	Nominated	
2010	"Poovinai Thirandhu"	Ananda Thandavam	Nominated	
2011	"Mannipaaya"	Vinnaithaandi Varuvaaya	Won	
2011	"Kadhal Anukkal"	Enthiran	Nominated	
2011	"Un Perai Sollum"	Angadi Theru	Nominated	
2011	"Kalvare"	Raavanan	Nominated	
2015	"Kandangi Kandangi"	Jilla	Nominated	
2018	"Neethanae"	Mersal	Nominated	

== West Bengal Film Journalists' Association Awards ==
The West Bengal Film Journalists' Association Awards (WBFJA Awards) are presented by the West Bengal Film Journalists' Association for the Bengali Film Industry. Shreya has won two awards for Best Female Playback Singer from eight nominations.

Year	Film	Nominated Song	Result	Ref.
2017	Bastu Shaap	"Tomake Chhuye Dilam"	Nominated	
2019	Ek Je Chhilo Raja	"Esho Hey"	Nominated	
2020	Parineeta	"Tomake"	Nominated	
2022	Prem Tame	"Kachhe Thako"	Won	
2023	X=Prem	"Bhalobashar Morshum"	Won	
2024	Manobjomin	"Toka Dile Bhenge Jabe"	Nominated	
2025	Ajogyo	"Tui Amar Hobi Na"	Nominated	
2025	Babli	"Elomelo Raat"	Nominated	

== Zee Cine Awards ==
The Zee Cine Awards are presented by Zee Network for the Hindi film industry. The awards were inaugurated in 1998 and include categories decided by public votes and an industry jury. The awards were not presented in 2009, 2010 and 2015. Ghoshal has received nine awards from twenty two nominations. She holds the record of maximum awards in Best Female Playback category.

Year	Film	Nominated song	Result	Ref.
2003	Devdas	"Dola Re Dola" (along with Kavita Krishnamurthy)	Won	
2004	Jism	"Jaadu Hai Nasha Hai"	Nominated	
2006	Parineeta	"Piyu Bole"	Won	
2007	Woh Lamhe	"So Jaoon Main"	Nominated	
2008	Guru	"Barso Re"	Won	
2008	Jab We Met	"Yeh Ishq Haye"	Nominated	
2008	Salaam-e-Ishq	"Salaam-e-Ishq" (along with Sadhana Sargam)	Nominated	
2011	Dabangg	"Chori Kiya Re Jiya"	Nominated	
2012	Shor in the City	"Saibo"	Won	
2012	The Dirty Picture	"Ooh Laa La"	Nominated	
2012	Bodyguard	"Teri Meri"	Nominated	
2013	Student of the Year	"Radha"	Nominated	
2013	Jab Tak Hai Jaan	"Saans"	Won	
2014	Aashiqui 2	"Sunn Raha Hai"	Won	
2016	Bajirao Mastani	"Deewani Mastani"	Nominated	
2016	Bajirao Mastani	"Pinga" (along with Vaishali Mhade)	Nominated	
2016	Bajirao Mastani	"Mohe Rang Do Laal"	Won	
2018	Half Girlfriend	"Thodi Der"	Nominated	
2019	Padmaavat	"Ghoomar"	Nominated	
2019	Dhadak	"Dhadak"	Nominated	
2020	Kalank	"Ghar More Pardesiya" (along with Vaishali Mhade)	Won	
2026	Saiyaara	"Saiyaara Reprise - Female"	Won	

== Zee Cine Awards Tamil ==
Year	Film	Nominated song	Result	Ref.
2020	NGK	"Anbe Peranbe"	Won	

== Zee Chitra Gaurav Puraskar ==
The Zee Chitra Gaurav Puraskar initiated by Zee Marathi are presented annually to reward excellence in Marathi cinema. Ghoshal has received four awards for Best Female Playback Singer from nine nominations.

Year	Nominated Song	Film	Result	Ref.
2010	Haluvaar Jaglya Hya	Anandi Anand	Nominated	
2012	"Ha Natyancha Khel Andhala"	Aarambh	Won	
2016	"Adhir Man Jhale"	Nilkanth Master	Nominated	
2017	"Aatach Baya Ka Baavarala"	Sairat	Won	
2018	"Roj Roj Navyane"	Deva	Nominated	
2022	"Jeev Rangla"	Jogwa	Won	
2023	"Chandra"	Chandramukhi	Won	
2023	"Sukh Kalale"	Ved	Nominated	
2024	"Baharla Ha Madhumas"	Maharashtra Shahir	Nominated	

== Other Awards ==
Year	Award	Category	Nominated work	Result	Ref.
2003	Sansui Viewers' Choice Movie Awards	Best Female Playback Singer	Devdas – "Dola Re Dola" (along with Kavita Krishnamurthy	Won	
2003	Stardust Awards	New Musical Sensation (Female)	Devdas - "Dola Re Dola"	Won	
2003	Bollywood Movie Awards	Best Female Playback Singer	Devdas - "Bairi Piya"	Nominated	
2005	ETV Bangla Film Awards	Best Female Playback Singer	Overall performance during the Year	Won	
2007	Global Indian Film Awards	Best Female Playback Singer	Lage Raho Munna Bhai - "Pal Pal Har Pal"	Nominated	
2007	Global Indian Film Awards	Best Female Playback Singer	Omkara - "O Saathi Re"	Nominated	
2009	Suvarna Film Awards	Best Female Playback Singer	Manasaare – "Naa Naguva Modalene"	Won	
2010	Gulf Malayalam Music Awards	Best Female Playback Singer	Neelathamara – "Anuragavilochananayi"	Won	
2010	Surya TV Film Awards	Best Female Playback Singer	Banaras - "Chaandhu Thottille"	Won	
2010	BIG Bangla Awards	Singer of the Year (Female)	Overall performance during the Year	Won	
2011	PTC Punjabi Film Awards	Best Female Playback Singer	Sukhmani: Hope for Life - "Rabba"	Won	
2011	Vijay Music Awards	Best Female Playback Singer	Vinnaithaandi Varuvaayaa – "Mannipaaya"	Won	
2011	Kerala Film Critics Association Awards	Best Female Playback Singer	Aagathan – "Manju Mazha"	Won	
2011	Zee Banglar Gourab Samman	Best Female Playback Singer	Autograph - "Chawl Raastaye"	Won	
2011	Zee Banglar Gourab Samman	Best Female Playback Singer	Autograph - "Uthche Jege Shawkalgulo"	Nominated	
2011	Zee Banglar Gourab Samman	Best Female Playback Singer	Le Chakka - "Ali Maula"	Nominated	
2011	Star Jalsha Entertainment Awards	Best Female Playback Singer	Autograph - "Chawl Raastaye"	Won	
2012	Global Indian Film & TV Honour	Best Female Playback Singer	Bodyguard - "Teri Meri"	Won	
2012	Dainik Bhaskar Bollywood Web Awards	Best Female Playback Singer	Bodyguard - "Teri Meri"	Won	
2012	The Kochi Times Film Awards	Best Female Playback Singer	Pranayam - "Paattil Ee Paattil "	Won	
2012	People's Choice Awards	Best Female Playback Singer	Agneepath – "Chikni Chameli"	Won	
2012	CineMAA Awards	Best Female Playback Singer	Mr. Perfect – "Chali Chaliga"	Won	
2012	CineMAA Awards	Best Female Playback Singer	Sri Rama Rajyam – "Seeta Seemantham"	Won	
2012	The Hyderabad Times Film Awards	Best Female Playback Singer	Mr. Perfect – "Chali Chaliga"	Won	
2012	Suvarna Film Awards	Best Female Playback Singer	Sanju Weds Geetha - "Gaganave Baagi"	Nominated	
2013	The Kochi Times Film Awards	Best Female Playback Singer	Chattakkari - "Nilave Nilave"	Nominated	
2014	World Music Awards	World's Best Indian Female Artist		Won	
2014	World Music Awards	Best Live Act		Nominated	
2014	IBNLive Movie Awards	Best Female Playback Singer	Aashiqui 2 – "Sunn Raha Hai"	Won	
2015	IBNLive Movie Awards	Best Female Playback Singer	Happy New Year – "Manwa Laage"	Won	
2015	Sakshi Excellence Awards	Most Popular Singer Of The Year - Female	Manam - "Chinni Chinni Aasalu"	Won	
2015	Artist Aloud Music Awards	Best Female Singer	Desi Moods	Nominated	
2016	Big Apple Music Awards	Most Popular Artist	Overall performance during the Year	Nominated	
2016	OSM Awards	Musician of the Year		Nominated	
2017	Lux Style Awards	Best Female Singer	Janaan – "Janaan" (Reprise)	Nominated	
2018	FilmiBeat Tamil of the Year	Singer of the Year	Bogan – "Vaarai Vaarai"; Puriyatha Puthir – "Mazhaikkulle"; Mersal – "Neethanae"	Won	
2018	Sony Mix Audience Music Awards	Best Female Playback Singer	Half Girlfriend – "Thodi Der"	Won	
2018	Sony Mix Audience Music Awards	Best Duet	Toilet: Ek Prem Katha -"Hans Mat Pagli"	Nominated	
2018	RED FM Tulu Film Awards	Best Female Playback Singer	Pilibail Yamunakka – "Cheepeda Naal Pada"	Nominated	
2018	Artist Aloud Music Awards	Best Single (Jury)	"Jiya Jaye Na" – Single (along with Europhia, Palash Sen, Deekshant Sahrawat)	Won	
2018	daf BAMA Music Awards	Best Indian Act	Overall performance during the Year	Nominated	
2018	Masala! Awards	Best Show (Entertainment)	Shreya Ghoshal Live in Concert Dubai	Nominated	
2019	Movie Street Awards	Best Female Playback Singer	Theevandi – "Jeevamshamayi"	Nominated	
2019	Movie Street Awards	Best Female Playback Singer	Captain – "Paalthira Paadum"	Nominated	
2019	Sony Mix Audience Music Awards	Best Female Playback Singer	Padmaavat – "Ghoomar"	Nominated	
2019	Sony Mix Audience Music Awards	Best Duet	Dhadak – "Dhadak"	Nominated	
2019	Entertainment Ka Baap Awards	Singers Ka Baap - Female	Padmaavat – "Ghoomar" & Dhadak - "Dhadak (title track)"	Nominated	
2019	Best of Tolly Awards 2018	Best Female Playback Singer	Tholi Prema - "Allasani Vaari"	Nominated	
2019	Red FM Malayalam Music Awards	Super Hit Female Singer	Neeyum Njanum - "Kunkumanira Sooryan"	Nominated	
2019	Viewer's Choice Awards	Favourite Female Playback Singer	Mr. Majnu – "Naalo Neeku"	Won	
2020	Muthirai Viruthugal	Best Female Playback Singer	Viswasam - "Vaaney Vaaney"	Won	
2020	Entertainment Ka Baap Awards	Best Female Playback Singer of the Year	Bharat - "Slow Motion" & Super 30 - "Jugrafiya"	Nominated	
2020	Gold Choice Awards	Best Playback Singer (Female)	Tanhaji - "Maay Bhavani"	Nominated	
2021	IWMBuzz REWIND 2020	Most Popular Music Star 2020 (Female)		Won	
2021	BMCI Choice Awards	Favourite Female Singer	Mann Bheetar - "Bhari Bhari"	Won	
2021	Clef Music Awards	All Time Favourite Musician		Won	
2021	Kreedam Awards 2021	Best Female Singer	Annaatthe - "Saara Kaattrae"	Won	
2022	Bollywood Now Choices	Best Female Playback Singer	Mimi – "Param Sundari" & Atrangi Re - "Chaka Chak"	Won	
2022	Indian Television Academy Awards	Best Singer	Mimi – "Param Sundari"	Nominated	
2022	Reporter TV Film Awards	Best Female Playback Singer	Marakkar: Lion of the Arabian Sea - "Ilaveyil"	Nominated	
2022	Fakt Marathi Cine Sanman	Best Female Playback Singer	Chandramukhi - "To Chand Rati"	Nominated	
2022	Pravah Picture Awards	Best Female Playback Singer	Chandramukhi - "Chandra"	Won	
2022	Pravah Picture Awards	Best Female Playback Singer	Me Vasantrao - Ram Ram Lori	Won	
2022	Eye Spy Awards	Best Singer of 2022		Won	
2022	The Super Cinema Awards	Best Female Singer	Gangubai Kathiawadi - "Jab Saiyaan"	Won	
2022	Kreedam Awards 2022	Best Female Singer	Ponniyin Selvan: I - "Ratchasa Maamaney"	Won	
2022	Indian Film and Television Awards (IFTA)	Most Popular Female Playback Singer	Bhoot Police - "Mujhe Pyaar Pyaar Hai"	Won	
2022	Indian Film and Television Awards (IFTA)	Most Popular Female Playback Singer	Atrangi Re - "Tere Rang"	Nominated	
2022	Best of Tolly Awards (2019 - 2020)	Best Female Playback Singer	Sye Raa Narasimha Reddy - "Sye Raa" (along with Sunidhi Chauhan	Nominated	
2023	Showsha Reel Awards	Best Female Playback Singer	Atrangi Re - "Chaka Chak"	Nominated	
2023	Behindwoods Gold Icons 2023	The Golden Global Voice Of Indian Cinema		Won	
2023	Sakal Premier Awards	Best Female Playback Singer	"Sukh Kalale" - Ved	Nominated	
2023	Navarashtra Planet Marathi Film OTT Awards	Best Singer (Female)	Chandramukhi - "Chandra"	Nominated	
2023	Navarashtra Planet Marathi Film OTT Awards	Best Singer (Female)	Ved - "Sukh Kalale"	Nominated	
2023	Tele Cine Awards	Best Female Singer	X=Prem - "Bhalobashar Morshum"	Nominated	
2023	Nickelodeon Kids' Choice Awards, India	Favourite Singer	Bhool Bhulaiyaa 2 - "Ami Je Tomar"	Nominated	
2023	Clef Music Awards 2023	Vocalist Of The Year (Female)	Sukoon - "Tujhe Bhi Chand"	Won	
2023	Big Tamil Rasigar Awards	Best Female Singer	Ponniyin Selvan: I - "Ratchasa Maamaney"	Nominated	
2023	Fakt Marathi Cine Sanman	Best Female Playback Singer	Ved - "Sukh Kalale"	Won	
2023	Fakt Marathi Cine Sanman	Best Female Playback Singer	Maharashtra Shahir - "Baharla Ha Madhumas"	Nominated	
2023	Celeb Middle East Awards	Best Duet (along with Saad Lamjarred)	"Guli Mata"	Won	
2023	Eye Spy Awards	Best Singer of 2023		Won	
2024	Mirchi OG Awards	OG Playback Singer (Female)	Rocky Aur Rani Kii Prem Kahaani - "Tum Kya Mile"	Won	
2024	Iconic Gold Awards	Best Song - Non Filmy	"Guli Mata"	Won	
2024	Blacksheep Voice Awards	Silver Jubilee Voice Of Indian Cinema		Won	
2024	Showsha Reel Awards	Best Female Singer (Popular Choice)	Rocky Aur Rani Kii Prem Kahaani - "Tum Kya Mile"	Nominated	
2024	GAMA Awards	Best Female Singer	Rules Ranjann - "Sammohanuda"	Nominated	
2024	Bollywood Life Awards	Best Playback Singer	Rocky Aur Rani Kii Prem Kahaani - "Tum Kya Mile"	Nominated	
2024	International Iconic Awards	Best Female Playback Singer	Rocky Aur Rani Kii Prem Kahaani - "Tum Kya Mile"	Nominated	
2024	Bollywood Hungama Style Icons Awards	Most Stylish Music Personality Of The Year		Nominated	
2024	Sakal Premier Awards	Best Female Playback Singer	Maharashtra Shahir - "Baharla Ha Madhumas"	Nominated	
2024	Aaryans Sanman	Best Female Playback Singer	Jhimma 2 - "Rang Jarasa Ola"	Nominated	
2025	Iconic Gold Awards	Best Song - Non Filmy	"Yimmy Yimmy"	Won	
2025	Moviefied Digital Awards	Best Playback Singer (Female)	Bhool Bhulaiyaa 3 - "Ami Je Tomar 3.0"	Nominated	
2025	Showsha Reel Awards	Best Playback Singer (Female)	Bhool Bhulaiyaa 3 - "Ami Je Tomar 3.0"	Nominated	
2025	GAMA Awards	Best Female Singer	Pushpa 2: The Rule - "Sooseki"	Nominated	
2025	JioSaavn India Superhits Awards	Most Streamed Female Singer of the Year (Bengali)		Won	
2025	International Iconic Awards	Best Singer of India (Female)	Bhool Bhulaiyaa 3 - "Ami Je Tomar 3.0"	Nominated	
2025	Chittara Music Awards	Public Choice Favourite Singer		Nominated	
2025	Clef Music Awards	Indian Cinema - Best Duet	Maalik - "Naamumkin"	Won	
2026	Bollywood Hungama Best Of 2025	Best Playback Singer (Female)	Saiyaara - "Saiyaara Reprise - Female"	Won	
2026	Moviefied Content Awards	Best Playback Singer (Female)	Saiyaara - "Saiyaara Reprise - Female"	Nominated	
2026	Moviefied Content Awards	Best Playback Singer (Female)	Metro... In Dino - "Qayde Se - Rewind"	Nominated	
2026	Zee 24 Ghanta Binodone Sera 24	Best Playback Singer (Female)	Dhumketu - "Gaane Gaane"	Nominated	
2026	JioSaavn India Superhits Awards	Most Streamed Female Artist (Hindi)	Saiyaara - "Saiyaara Reprise - Female"	Won	
2026	JioSaavn India Superhits Awards	Most Streamed Female Artist (Bengali)	Dhumketu - "Gaane Gaane"	Won	
2026	Pinkvilla Screen and Style Icons Awards	Best Playback Singer - Female	Saiyaara - "Saiyaara Reprise - Female"	Won	
2026	Indian Film & TV Awards	Most Popular Bollywood Female Playback Singer	Saiyaara - "Saiyaara Reprise - Female"	Won	
2026	CNN-News18 Indian of The Year 2026	Entertainment		Pending	
2026	Chittara Music Awards	Voice of India		Pending	

== Other Honorary Awards ==
Year	Award	Presenter	Citation	Ref.
2010	Swaralaya Kairali Yesudas Awards	Sarwalaya & Kairali TV	"For her outstanding performance in Malayalam Cinema"	
2010	Sera Bengali Awards	Star Ananda		
2015	Serar Sera Bengali Awards	North American Bengali Conference		
2018	Maharashtrian Of The Year Awards	Lokmat	Performing Arts	
2023	The Shanghai Cooperation Organization (SCO) Film Festival	Ministry of Information and Broadcasting	For "Eminent Film Personality"	
2023	The Shankar Shambhu Memorial Awards	Blessing Entertainment and BCCA	For her immense contribution towards music.	
2026	21st Asha Bhosle Award	Akhil Bharatiya Marathi Natya Parishad	For her outstanding contribution to music at the national level	

== See also ==
- List of songs recorded by Shreya Ghoshal
- Filmography of Shreya Ghoshal
