= 12th Mirchi Music Awards =

2020 Hindi language movie-music award ceremony

12th Smule Mirchi Music Awards
- Sponsored by: Smule
- Date: 19 February 2020
- Location: Yash Raj Studio, Mumbai
- Country: India
- Presented by: Radio Mirchi
- Hosted by: Aparshakti Khurana; Neeti Mohan; Shekhar Ravjiani

Highlights
- Most awards: Kalank
- Most nominations: Kalank
- Male Vocalist of the Year: Arijit Singh for "Kalank (Title song)"
- Female Vocalist of the Year: Shreya Ghoshal for "Ghar More Pardesiya"
- Website: Music Mirchi Awards 2019

Television/radio coverage
- Network: Zee TV
- Viewership: 1.8

The 12th Smule Mirchi Music Awards or simply Mirchi Music Awards 2020, was the 12th edition of the Mirchi Music Awards and took place on 19 February 2020. The award ceremony was hosted by Aparshakti Khurana, Neeti Mohan, and Shekhar Ravjiani at Yash Raj Studios, Mumbai. The title sponsor was Smule, replacing Pepsi.

== Winners and nominees ==
Winners are indicated in bold.

=== Song of the year ===
- **Kalank (Title track)** by Arijit Singh
- "Chashni" by Abhijeet Srivastava
- "Apna Time Aayega" by Ranveer Singh
- "Tujhe Kitna Chahne Lage" by Arijit Singh
- "Challa" by Romy, Shashwat Sachdev & Vivek Hariharan
- "Ghungroo" by Arijit Singh & Shilpa Rao

=== Album of the Year ===
- **Kesari** - **Arko Pravo Mukherjee, Chirrantan Bhatt, Gurmoh, Jasbir Jassi, Jasleen Royal, Tanishk Bagchi, Kumaar, Kunwar Juneja, Manoj Muntashir**
- Bharat - Vishal–Shekhar, Ali Abbas Zafar, Julius Packiam, Irshad Kamil
- Gully Boy - Ankur Tewari, Divine, Dub Sharma, Ishq Bector, Jasleen Royal, Ace aka Mumbai, Chandrashekar Kunder (Major C), Hardeep, Kaam Bhaari, Karsh Kale, Midival Punditz, Mikey McCleary, Naezy, Prem, Sez on the Beat, Raghu Dixit, Rishi Rich, Spitfire & Viveick Rajagopalan, Javed Akhtar, 100 RBH, Aditya Sharma, Arjun, Bhinder Khanpuri, Blitz, Desi Ma, Gaurav Raina, Maharya, MC Altaf, MC TodFod, MC Mawali, Noxious D, Tapan Raj, D-Cypher, BeatRaw
- Kabir Singh - Akhil Sachdeva, Amaal Mallik, Mithoon, Sachet–Parampara & Vishal Mishra, Irshad Kamil, Kumaar, Manoj Muntashir
- Kalank - Pritam, Amitabh Bhattacharya

=== Listeners Choice Song of the Year ===
- **Bekhayali** by Sachet Tandon
- "Slow Motion" by Shreya Ghoshal & Nakash Aziz
- "Apna Time Aayega" by Ranveer Singh & Divine
- "Ve Maahi" by Arijit Singh & Asees Kaur
- "Coca Cola Tu" by Neha Kakkar & Tony Kakkar (rap by: Young Desi)

=== Listeners Choice Album of the Year ===
- **Kabir Singh**
- Bharat
- Gully Boy
- Kalank
- Kesari

=== Listeners Choice Independent Music Category ===
- **"Vaaste"** by Dhvani Bhanushali
- "Dheeme Dheeme" by Tony Kakkar
- "Lehenga" by Jass Manak
- "Makhna" by Honey Singh & Neha Kakkar
- "Paagal" by Badshah

=== Male Vocalist of the Year ===
- **Arijit Singh - "Kalank"** from **Kalank**
- Arijit Singh - "Tujhe Kitna Chahne Lage" from Kabir Singh
- Ranveer Singh & Divine - "Apna Time Ayega" from Gully Boy
- B Praak - "Teri Mitti" from Kesari
- Romy, Vivek Hariharan, Shashwat Sachdev - "Challa" from Uri: The Surgical Strike

=== Female Vocalist of the Year ===
- **Shreya Ghoshal** for **"Ghar More Pardesiya"**
- Neha Bhasin for "Chashni"
- Parampara Thakur for "Mere Sohneya"
- Shreya Ghoshal for "Tabaah Ho Gaye"
- Shilpa Rao for "Ghungroo"

=== Music Composer of the Year ===
- **Pritam - "Kalank"** from **Kalank**
- Sachet–Parampara - "Bekhayali" from Kabir Singh
- Mithoon - "Tujhe Kitna Chahne Lage" from Kabir Singh
- Pritam - "Ghar More Pardesiya" from Kalank
- Shashwat Sachdev - "Beh Chala" from Uri: The Surgical Strike

=== Lyricist of the Year ===
- **Amitabh Bhattacharya** - **"Kalank"** from **Kalank**
- Irshad Kamil - "Bekhayali" from Kabir Singh
- Manoj Muntashir - "Teri Mitti" from Kesari
- Prasoon Joshi - "Bharat" from Manikarnika: The Queen of Jhansi
- Raj Shekhar - "Beh Chala" from Uri: The Surgical Strike

=== Upcoming Male Vocalist of the Year ===
- **Abhijeet Srivastava** for **"Chashni"**
- Amit Gupta for "Radhe Radhe"
- Divne, Naezy & Ranveer Singh for "Mere Gully Mein"
- Shantanu Sudame for "Manzar Hai Yeh Naya"

=== Upcoming Female Vocalist of the Year ===
- **Aakanksha Sharma** for **"Tum Chale Gaye"**
- Swati Mehul for "Naah Goriye"
- Hriti Tikadar for "Jiya"
- Deepanshi Nagar for "Mann Mein Shiva"
- Sarodee Borah for "Sapne Jo Bhi"

=== Upcoming Lyricist of the Year ===
- **Sahib** for **"Lahu Ka Rang Kara"**
- Bharaga v Purohit for "Bala song"
- Ari Leff, Michael Pollack & Gurpreet Saini for "Dil Na Jaaneya"
- Splitfire" for "Asli Hip Hop"
- Divne & Naezy for "Mere Gully Mein"

=== Upcoming Music Composer ===
- **Piyush Shankar** for **"Naina Yeh"**
- Splitfire for "Asli Hip Hop"
- Divine, Naezy & Sez for "Mere Gully Mein"
- Gurmoh for "Deh Shiva"
- Payal Dev for "Tum Hi Aana"
- Shidharth Bhavsar for "Aaj Jage Rahna"
- Sanjoy Bose for "Ore Chanda"

=== Recreated Song of the Year ===
- **"Hume Tumse Pyar Kitana"** by **Shreya Ghoshal**
- "O Saki Saki" by B Praak, Tulsi Kumar & Neha Kakkar
- "Akhiyon Se Golu Maare" by Mika Singh & Tulsi Kumar
- "The Jawani Song" by Payal Dev & Vishal Dadlani
- "Mungda" by Jyotica Tangri, Shaan & Subhro Ganguly

=== Independent Music Category ===
- **Jaan Meri** by **Anuradha Palakurtihi**
- "Awaara Shaam Hai" by Piyush Mehroliya
- "Filhall" by B Praak
- "Ishq Ne" by Anuradha Palakurtihi
- "Woh Baarishein" by Arjun Kanungo

Source - E Times

== Jury ==
=== Screening Jury ===
- 1. Shruti Pathak
- 2. Abhishek Ray
- 3. Anand Sharma
- 4. Akbar Sami
- 5. Bishwadeep Chatterjee
- 6. Dominique
- 7. Nandini
- 8. Kavita Seth
- 9. Shibani Kashyap
- 10. Priya Sarayia
- 11. Hamsika Iyer
- 12. Aaman Trikha
- 13. Manoj Muntashir
- 14. Mayur Puri
- 15. Bipin Aneja
- 16. Brayan
- 17. Shadab Faridi
- 18. Brijesh Sandiliyar
- 19. Antara Mitra
- 20. Jeetu Shankar
- 21. Bhoomi Trivedi
- 22. Paroma Das Gupta
- 23. Divya Kumar

=== Grand Jury ===
- 1. Kavita Krishnamurthy
- 2. Ila Arun
- 3. Vidya Shah
- 4. Ramesh Sippy
- 5. Sudhir Mishra
- 6. Dharmesh Darshan
- 7. Ahmed Khan
- 8. Suresh Wadkar
- 9. Sharvan Rathod (of Nadeem-Shravan)
- 10. Millind Srivastava (of Anand–Milind)
- 11. Pritam
- 12. Louiz Banks
- 13. Lalit Pandit
- 14. Raju Singh
- 15. Sameer Anjaan (lyricist)
- 16. Irshad Kamil
- 17. Talat Aziz
- 18. Roop Kumar Rathod
- 19. Udit Narayan
- 20. Pandit Sujit Ojha
- 21. Vijay Dayal
- 22. Himesh Reshammiya

Source - E Times

== Special awards ==
=== Jury Award for Outstanding Contribution to Hindi Film Music ===
- Amar Haldipur

=== Lifetime Achievement Award / K. L. Saigal Sangeet Shehenshah Award ===
- Usha Mangeshkar

=== Special Jury Award for Golden Era Album of the Year (1959) ===
- Anari & Sujatha for 1959

=== Best Raag Inspired Song of the Year ===
- "Dhola" from Yeh Hai India

=== Make It Large Award ===
- Deepika Padukone

=== Mirchi Social Media Icon of the Year ===
- Neha Kakkar

=== Mirchi Trendsetters Album of the year ===
- Gully Boy

== Technical Awards ==
=== Song Producer - Programming and Arranging ===
- DJ Phukan, Prasad Sashte, Prakash Peters & Sunny MR for the song "Ghar More Pardesiya"

=== Song Engineer - Recording and Mixing ===
- Vijay Dayal for the song "Jugaarafiya"

=== Background Score ===
- Mangesh Dhakde for Article 15

== See also ==
Mirchi Music Awards
