= Kalank (soundtrack) =

2019 film score by Pritam

Soundtrack album by Pritam Chakraborty
- Released: 14 April 2019
- Recorded: 2018–2019
- Genre: Feature film soundtrack
- Length: 49:54
- Language: Hindi
- Label: Zee Music Company
- Producer: Pritam Chakraborty

Pritam Chakraborty chronology
Jab Harry Met Sejal (2017)	Kalank (2019)	Chhichhore (2019)

External audio
- Audio Jukebox on YouTube

Kalank (transl. stigma or blemish) is the soundtrack album for the 2019 Indian romantic film of the same name, directed by Abhishek Varman and produced by Karan Johar, Sajid Nadiadwala and Fox Star Studios, featuring an ensemble cast includes Madhuri Dixit, Sonakshi Sinha, Alia Bhatt, Varun Dhawan, Aditya Roy Kapur, Sanjay Dutt. The music is composed by Pritam Chakraborty, with lyrics written by Amitabh Bhattacharya.

After five songs were released from the film as singles, the soundtrack album was released on 14 April 2019, by Zee Music Company.

== Development ==
=== Marketing ===
The first song of the film "Ghar More Pardesiya" was released on 18 March 2019. The music video for the song was simultaneously released, starring Alia Bhatt, Madhuri Dixit and Varun Dhawan amidst a Hindu festival celebrating the Ramayana. A "behind the scenes" video of the song, was released on 20 March 2019. In the video, the different people who contributed towards the musical number, from singer Shreya Ghoshal to choreographer Remo D'Souza to designer Manish Malhotra and producer Karan Johar can be seen sharing their experience while filming the song. The 'jugalbandi' between Madhuri and Alia was the highlight of the entire song. While dancing, Alia was in a white anarkali with a dupatta.

The second song "First Class" was released on 22 March 2019. The song which is penned by Amitabh Bhattacharya and choreographed by Remo D'Souza marks the entry of Varun Dhawan's character Zafar's entry in the period film. Set in Hira Mandi, the song presents the nuances of Varun's character with a subtle play of lyrics in a light-hearted manner. The song which features nearly 500 dancers also shows Kiara Advani showing off her dance moves alongside Dhawan. Dhawan and Advani had been sharing stills and glimpses from the song since a few days on their respective social media handles and their camaraderie has been liked by the audience, who had desperately waited to see the two dance in the song 'First Class'. Pritam, who has composed the song had earlier told BT that "The idea was to come up with a track that feels like a retro number from the 50s. We had to create a fun, mohalla song which has masti and mazak with a beautiful underlying layer of emotion. Striking that balance in terms of lyrics and the tune was challenging. It felt amazing when we finally cracked it." Elaborating on this, he further added, "The character is being introduced to the audience; he talks about a lot of things he feels, sees and experiences around him, but believes 'sab first class hai.' That's how we got the title of the song. While I can't reveal the relevance of this number in the plot, I can just say that it takes the narrative ahead."

The title track of the movie, was released on 30 March 2019, along with the music video. The music video featured characters of Dhawan and Alia Bhatt "falling for each other in silent moments".

The fourth song "Tabah Ho Gaye" featuring Madhuri Dixit was released on 9 April 2019. The song has usual characteristics of Dixit. It is sung by Shreya Ghoshal and liked by the audience. Before the song's release, Karan Johar had shared the first look of the song and, in no time, fans were making comparisons with Madhuri's iconic song from Devdas called Maar Dala. However, the actor refuted the comparison saying that since the characters were different the songs are different too. Speaking to DNA, she said: "Bahaar Begum is a different personality than say a Chandramukhi. So, we had to choreograph (the song) keeping her mentality in mind. The challenge in this was that Bahaar Begum's character is such that given a choice maybe she wouldn't have danced also. Her character is like that." Madhuri also revealed that the song comes at an emotional moment in the film. She was quoted as saying, "... it comes at a very emotional point in the movie. It's a slow song. It's an emotional song. The whole story and the characters come together in the song." The fifth song of the film "Aira Gaira" was released on 13 April 2019.

== Track listing ==
All lyrics are written by Amitabh Bhattacharya.

Track listing
No.	Title	Singer(s)	Length
1.	"Ghar More Pardesiya"	Shreya Ghoshal	5:19
2.	"First Class"	Arijit Singh, Neeti Mohan	4:36
3.	"Kalank - Title Track"	Arijit Singh	5:11
4.	"Tabaah Ho Gaye"	Shreya Ghoshal	5:42
5.	"Aira Gaira" (Extended)	Antara Mitra, Javed Ali, Tushar Joshi	5:41
6.	"Rajvaadi Odhni"	Jonita Gandhi	4:00
7.	"Kalank - Title Track" (Duet Version)	Arijit Singh, Shilpa Rao	5:11
8.	"Ghar More Pardesiya" (Radio Edit)	Shreya Ghoshal, Vaishali Mhade	4:18
9.	"Aira Gaira"	Antara Mitra, Javed Ali, Tushar Joshi	4:48
10.	"Kalank - Title Track" (Bonus Track)	Arijit Singh, Shilpa Rao	5:08
Total length:			49:54

== Reception ==
- Pratishruti Ganguly of Firstpost reviewed the soundtrack album, stating that "The music of Kalank seems to bolster the large-scale drama that the film promises, to optimum effect. The riveting soundtrack recreates an era gone by with its thorough research and extensive soundscape." She also wrote that while the soundtrack never truly derailed from its classical ethos, songs such as "Aira Gaira" and '"First Class", "anchor[ed] it firmly to millennial appeal."
- BizAsia gave favourable reviews, with a final word stating that "The soundtrack of Kalank is well worth the wait and disappearance of Pritam in 2018 as he makes a strong comeback with what could be the biggest soundtrack of 2019. This is true to what one expects from a multi-cast top A-league Bollywood production that features the work of Amitabh Bhattacharya with Pritam. They are both fire every time they come along as the deliver some unique melodies and composition that are difficult to fathom when one listens to their songs and wonder "how did they ever come up with this!" Kalank – Title Track is one of those romantic songs that exudes talent in every aspect and is a genius arrangement. Ghar More Pardesiya is a top opening song that is classically perfect with a great melody and has a very strong star value and thus a strong personality. Tabaah Ho Gaye is good too but limited in its appeal and rather dull after a few listens. First Class and Aira Gaira are top party songs in their respective genre styles and give further depth and variety to the album. Musically one can't fault how Pritam conducts and composes his songs while carefully balancing the classical and modern relevance of each song. Except for a couple mediocre songs and some forcer filler songs the rest are almost spotless! Lyrics consistently range from good to brilliant while vocally one has Shreya Ghoshal and Arijit Singh leading the way for a great soundtrack! Overall this is a collector's album with a sound as grand as the film's sets, costumes and cast."
- Bollywood Hungama, gave positive verdict for the soundtrack as "Pritam comes up with a very good soundtrack for Kalank and is helped a great deal by lyricist Amitabh Bhattacharya. Moreover, there is a consistency of sound right through half a dozen odd songs that feature in the soundtrack. Even though the film is set in the 40s and the music complements that era as well, even today's audience can well be entertained."
- Bollyspice rated the album 4 out of 5, as "As stated previously, budget would not have been a concern when Pritam was brought on to write this album. He has delivered a very long album, filled with dance numbers, thus giving all the stars their own chance to show off what they have. However, considering this length, not only in number but length of individual tracks, there are only a few singers employed across all the songs. Also, there is the padding of using reversions of the same song for a couple of the dazzling numbers here. This makes it very hard going through the album, especially in the modern Bollywood style of getting in singers for the odd rap break. At the same time, Pritam has not concentrated his instrumentation choices on the time period but more so towards the story itself, picking violins where others would have avoided for instance. All in all, this makes the album very heavy, very sad overall but where it shines, it shines like a thousand suns."
