= Ghar More Pardesiya =

2019 song by Shreya Ghoshal & Vaishali Mhade

- Song cover

Song by Shreya Ghoshal featuring Vaishali Mhade (radio edit only)

from the album Kalank
- Language: Hindi
- Released: 18 March 2019
- Recorded: Newedge, Mumbai
- Genre: Filmi, Bhajan, Classical
- Length: 5:19
- Label: Zee Music
- Composer: Pritam Chakraborty
- Lyricist: Amitabh Bhattacharya

Music video
- "Ghar More Pardesiya" on YouTube

"Ghar More Pardesiya" is a Hindi-language song from the soundtrack of the 2019 Bollywood film Kalank. The song is sung by Shreya Ghoshal and composed by Pritam Chakraborty. The lyrics were penned by Amitabh Bhattacharya. The accompanying video features Madhuri Dixit, Alia Bhatt, and Varun Dhawan. A radio edit was also released, with Vaishali Mhade providing supporting vocals. Ghoshal and Mhade had previously collaborated in 2015, singing "Pinga" for the 2015 movie Bajirao Mastani.

== Development ==
"Ghar More Pardesiya" was mixed and mastered by Shadab Rayeen at Newedge in Mumbai. It was arranged and programmed by Prasad Sashte and the choreography was done by Remo D'Souza in a classical style.

== Release ==
The video was released on the official YouTube page of Zee Music Company on 19 March 2019. The audio version was also released simultaneously across various audio platforms including Spotify, Saavn, Gaana, Amazon Prime Music, Zee5, Wynk Music, iTunes, Apple Music, and others.

== Music video ==
The video features Madhuri Dixit, Alia Bhatt, and Varun Dhawan. It involves Dixit singing a classical Ramayana bhajan and training a group of dancers, while Bhatt and Dhawan are seen roaming around a fair depicting the Ramayana story.

== Chart performance ==
The song debuted on the Mirchi Music Top 20 countdown on 30 March 2019 in 6th position. It rose to 3rd position in the next few weeks and stayed in the chart for 4 weeks, out of which it was in Top 5 for more than 3 consecutive weeks.

Year	Chart	Peak Position	Time Span on Chart	Ref.
2019	iTunes Countdown Chart	1	—N/a	
2019	Mirchi Music Top 20 Countdown	3	4 weeks	

== Accolades ==
- Screen Awards for Best Female Playback Singer (2019): Winner
- Mirchi Music Award for Female Vocalist of The Year for Best Female Vocalist of The Year (2020): Winner
- Filmfare Award for Best Female Playback Singer 2020): Nominee
- Zee Cine Awards (2020): Winner
- Best Composer of The Year in Mirchi Music Awards (2020): Nominated
- 12th Mirchi Music Awards (2020) Song Producer - Programming and Arranging Given to DJ Phukan, Prasad Sashte, Prakash Peters, and Sunny MR: Winner
