= Vaishali Made =

Indian singer

Vaishali Bhaisane-Made
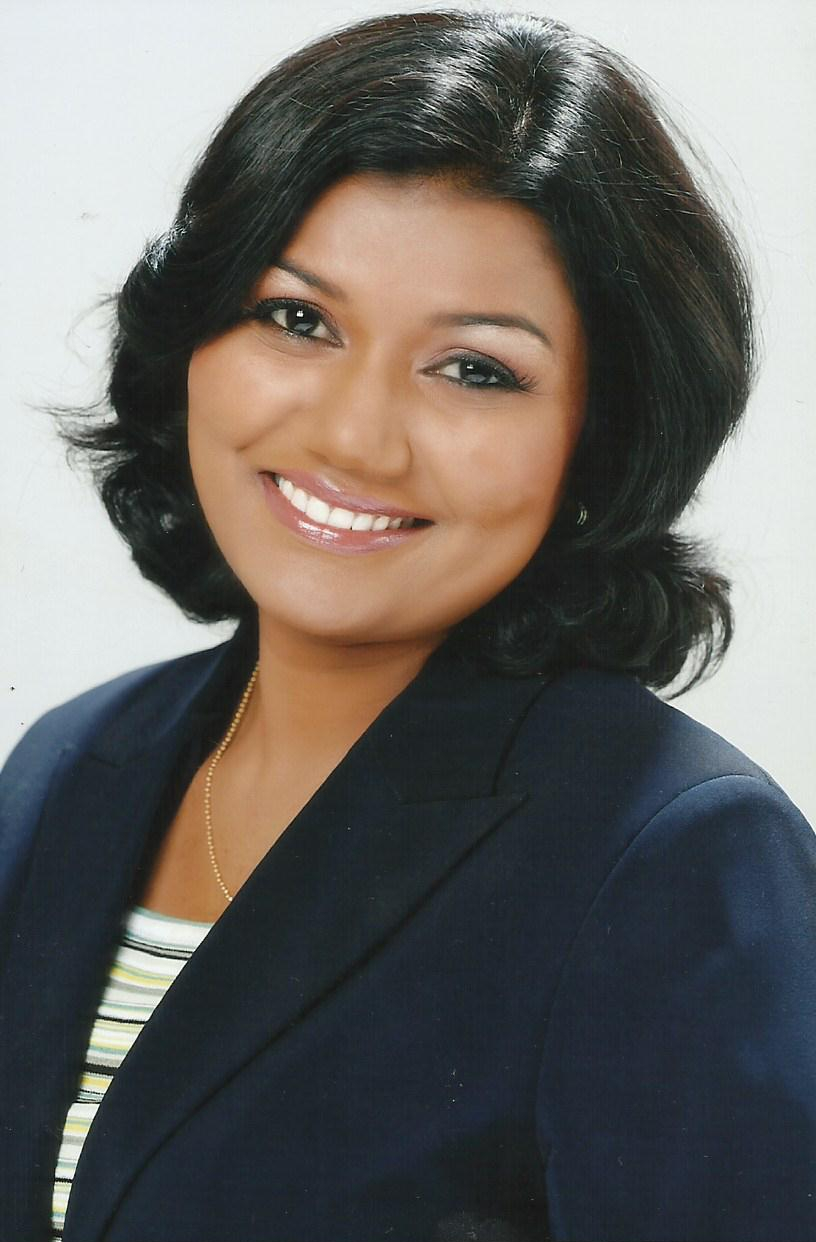
- Born: 21 August 1984 (age 42); Khartalegaon, Maharashtra, India
- Occupation: Playback singer
- Years active: 2008–present
- Spouse: Anant Made (m. 2004)
- Children: 1

Vaishali Made (born 21 August 1984) is an Indian singer and winner of Zee TV's reality series, Sa Re Ga Ma Pa Challenge 2009. She sings primarily in Marathi language. Originally from Hinganghat in Vidarbha, Maharashtra, Made is married to Anant Made in Hinganghat, and the mother of a girl, Aastha Made. She was a contestant in the reality show Bigg Boss Marathi in 2019. She has won the Filmfare Awards Marathi for Best Female Playback Singer in 2025 for her Lavani rendition in Phullwanti.

Made made it to the top 3 in Zee TV's Sa Re Ga Ma Pa Challenge 2009 with Soumen Nandi and Yashita Yashpal Sharma and because of her huge fan following across India she won the Sa Re Ga Ma Pa Challenge 2009, along with a Rs 50-lakh music contract with Zee TV, a Hyundai i10 car and a LCD TV. Made was placed in Himesh Reshammiya's "Rock Gharana" and throughout her entire journey in Sa Re Ga Ma Pa Challenge 2009, she proved herself to be a versatile, conventional and consistent singer. In addition, she also won the Sa Re Ga Ma Pa Marathi in 2008.

== Career ==
Vaishali sung a title track for the Marathi daily soap, "Kulvadhu", a popular show aired on Zee Marathi. She has also sung for Shridhar Phadke in his album Sangeet Manmohee Re. At the 2009 Nagpur International Marathon, she was a special invitee along with Olympics gold medalist Abhinav Bindra. She made her Bollywood singing debut with the song Hum Tum in the movie Damadamm! (2011). It was a duet track between Made and Himesh Reshammiya. She sang at Lord Buddha live T.V. show. She has recently given playback for the duet song "Pinga" along with Shreya Ghoshal for the movie Bajirao Mastani. The song features Deepika Padukone and Priyanka Chopra. She has also lent her voice for 'Fitoori' in the same film. The movie is produced by Sanjay Leela Bhansali and was released on 19 December 2015. Vaishali sung a title track for the Marathi daily soap, "Honar Soon Mi Hya Gharchi", a popular show aired on Zee Marathi. Vaishali sung a title track for the Marathi daily soap, "Majhya Navaryachi Bayko", a popular show aired on Zee Marathi. Recently she lend her voice in movie Kalank along with Shreya Ghoshal in song 'Ghar More Pardesiya'. Vaishali was one of the Celebrity participants of this Marathi singing Reality Show. She quit the show on 21 February 2018 telecast to pursue PHD and MPhil.

In 2024, music director Avinash–Vishwajeet offered her the opportunity to be the voice of Phullwanti, the lead female character of Phullwanti, who was portrayed by Prajakta Mali for the Song Madanmanjiri. She received Numerous Accolades and high Praise.

== Discography ==
=== Film songs ===
Year	Film	Song	Language	Co-artist
2011	Damadamm!	"Hum Tum"	Hindi	Himesh Reshammiya
2015	Hunterrr	"Ye Na Gade"	Marathi	Anand Shinde
2015	Bajirao Mastani	"Pinga"	Hindi	Shreya Ghoshal
2015	Bajirao Mastani	"Fitoori"	Hindi	Ganesh Chandanshive
2016	Jugad	"Moharala Maal"	Marathi	Solo
2017	Garbh	"Yeu De Dukh Kiti"	Marathi	Swapnil Bandodkar
2018	Friendship Band	"Aho Raya Mala"	Marathi	Solo
2018	Nirbhaya	"Breaking News"	Hindi	Solo
2018	Angrezi Mein Kehte Hain	"Meri Aankhein"	Hindi	Shaan, Pravin Kunvar
2018	Mulshi Pattern	"Unn Unn Vhatat"	Marathi	Avadhoot Gupte
2019	Kalank	"Ghar More Pardesiya"	Hindi	Shreya Ghoshal
2022	Gaon Ale Gotyat Pandhra Lakh Khatyat	"Ishkaat Houya Dang"	Marathi	Yash Unhavane
2022	Vijayi Bhav	"Re Mana Mazhya Mana"	Marathi	Solo
2022	De Dhakka 2	"Bhingari"	Marathi	Solo
2023	Raundal	"Dhagana Aabhal"	Marathi	Javed Ali
2023	Raundal	"Mann Baharla"	Marathi	Solo
2023	Raundal	"Bhalari"	Marathi	Ganesh Chandanshive
2023	Sarja	"Sangtina Tujhya"	Marathi	Harsshit Abhiraj
2023	Butterfly	"Kori Kori Zing"	Marathi	Solo
2024	Phullwanti	"Madanmanjiri"	Marathi	Solo
2025	Parinati	"Rani"	Marathi	Prajkta Shukre
2025	Parinati	"Maitri"	Marathi	Solo

=== Non-film songs ===
Year	Album	Song	Language	Composer	Co-artist
2008	Kulvadhu	"Kulvadhu"	Marathi	Nilesh Moharir	Solo
2013	Honar Soon Mi Hya Gharchi	"Honar Soon Mi Hya Gharchi"	Marathi	Nilesh Moharir	Shruti Bhave
2013	Honar Soon Mi Hya Gharchi	"Ladaki Soon Mi Hya Gharchi"	Marathi	Nilesh Moharir	Shruti Bhave
2016	Majhya Navaryachi Bayko	"Majhya Navaryachi Bayko"	Marathi	Avinash–Vishwajeet	Solo

== Television ==
Year	Name	Role	Channel	Notes	Ref
2019	Bigg Boss Marathi 2	Contestant	Colors Marathi	Evicted on Day 56	

== Awards ==
Damani – Patel Award also known as The Karmayogi Award along with Madhu Mangesh Karnik and Chandu Borde.

Best Playback Female award for film Vaghi under 5th Godrej Expert Sahyadri Cine Awards 2014.

Year	Award Ceremony	Category	Film	Song	Result	Ref.
2015	Mirchi Music Awards	Upcoming Female Vocalist of The Year	Bajirao Mastani	"Pinga"	Nominated	
2015	Mirchi Music Awards	Female Vocalist of The Year	Bajirao Mastani	"Pinga"(Along with Shreya Ghoshal)	Nominated	
2019	Screen Awards	Best Female Playback Singer	Kalank	"Ghar more pardesia"(Along with Shreya Ghoshal)	Won	
2020	Filmfare Awards	Best Female Playback Singer	Kalank	"Ghar more pardesia"(Along with Shreya Ghoshal)	Nominated	
2020	Zee Cine Awards	Best Female Playback Singer	Kalank	"Ghar more pardesia"(Along with Shreya Ghoshal)	Won	
2025	Maharashtra Times Sanman Awards	Best Female Playback Singer	Phullwanti	Madanmanjiri	Won	
2025	Zee Chitra Gaurav Puraskar	Best Female Playback Singer	Phullwanti	Madanmanjiri	Won	
2025	NDTV Marathi Entertainment Awards	Best Female Playback Singer	Phullwanti	Madanmanjiri	Won	
2025	Filmfare Awards Marathi	Best Female Playback Singer	Phullwanti	Madanmanjiri	Won	
