= Kalank =

2019 Indian film by Abhishek Varman

- Theatrical release poster
- Directed by: Abhishek Varman
- Screenplay by: Abhishek Varman
- Dialogues by: Hussain Dalal
- Story by: Shibani Bathija
- Produced by: Karan Johar; Sajid Nadiadwala; Hiroo Yash Johar; Apoorva Mehta
- Starring: Varun Dhawan; Alia Bhatt; Aditya Roy Kapoor; Sonakshi Sinha; Madhuri Dixit; Sanjay Dutt; Kunal Khemu; Kiara Advani
- Cinematography: Binod Pradhan
- Edited by: Shweta Venkat Mathew
- Music by: Songs: Pritam; Score: Sanchit Balhara and Ankit Balhara
- Production companies: Dharma Productions; Nadiadwala Grandson Entertainment
- Distributed by: Fox Star Studios
- Release date: 17 April 2019 (India)
- Running time: 165 minutes
- Country: India
- Language: Hindi
- Budget: ₹130 crore
- Box office: est. ₹146.31 crore

Kalank (pronounced [kəˈləŋk]; lit. Blemish or Stigma) is a 2019 Indian Hindi-language period romantic drama film. It was directed by Abhishek Varman and produced by Karan Johar, Hiroo Yash Johar, and Apoorva Mehta under Dharma Productions, and Sajid Nadiadwala under Nadiadwala Grandson Entertainment, in association with Fox Star Studios as presenter and distributor. The film is set in the pre-independence British era. The film stars an ensemble cast consisting of Varun Dhawan, Alia Bhatt, Aditya Roy Kapur, Sonakshi Sinha, Madhuri Dixit, and Sanjay Dutt.

Kalank marked the first film distributed by Fox Star Studios following the acquisition of 21st Century Fox by Disney. It was released on 17 April 2019 on 5,300 screens worldwide, making it the widest Bollywood release of 2019. The film grossed around ₹146.31 crore, emerging as a box-office bomb, though it recovered its budget. It received mixed reviews upon release, with praise for its soundtrack, cinematography, production design, costumes and performances of the ensemble cast, but criticism towards its direction, story, screenplay and length.

At the 65th Filmfare Awards, Kalank received 7 nominations, including Best Supporting Actress (Dixit) and Best Music Director (Pritam), and won 2 awards – Best Male Playback Singer (Arijit Singh for "Kalank") and Best Choreography (Remo D'Souza for "Ghar More Pardesiya").

== Plot ==
Satya Chaudhry is informed by her doctor that she has terminal cancer with 1 year to live. She goes back to her native village in the Rajputana area and requests her acquaintance, Roop, to provide companionship to her husband, Dev Chaudhry who runs a liberal newspaper. Roop rejects Satya's proposal and retorts that just because Satya's father had done a lot of favours to her family, she cannot balance the scales by asking inappropriate favours but later gets convinced by her father, Dharampal, and agrees on the condition that she will marry Dev to which Satya agrees.

Once married, Dev tells Roop that he still loves Satya and that their relationship will only be cordial and platonic. A depressed Roop takes solace in music, which she begins by learning from the madam of a kotha, Bahaar Begum. Roop also begins working in her husband's publishing house, to use her education to her advantage. Roop expresses interest in writing about the condition of Heera Mandi, the locality in which the kotha is located, during which she meets with a womanising blacksmith named Zafar.

Zafar wants to exact revenge on his parents, Bahaar Begum and Balraj Chaudhry (who abandoned Zafar after ending his extramarital affair with Bahaar) by seducing Roop, as she is married to Balraj's legitimate son, Dev. Roop misconstrues Zafar's intentions and falls in love with him. She also begins to develop a friendship with Dev, much to Satya's happiness and sadness. Satya dies after urging Dev to give Roop a chance and to forgive Balraj for his affair. As part of another effort to humiliate Balraj, Zafar instigates communal hatred in his friend, Abdul Khan, by demanding the partition of India on religious lines, which Balraj and Dev do not support.

When Balraj becomes aware of Roop and Zafar's love, he confronts Bahaar and Zafar. Bahaar, who disagrees with Zafar's approach, warns Roop and tells her about Zafar's real intentions. Heartbroken, Roop consummates her marriage with Dev but insists that she would never be able to love him. As Abdul's political stance gains leverage, riots against Hindus and Sikhs in the city take place, during which the Chaudhrys decide to flee to Amritsar. Zafar confesses to Roop that he fell in love with her, despite his early intentions. Zafar helps Roop and Dev escape on a train and is killed in the process, leaving Roop heartbroken.

10 years later, Roop and Dev are interviewed about their experience by Aditya, a journalist documenting the partition. The story ends with Roop remembering Zafar and her inner voice saying that the colours of both love and hatred are red, but it's love that often gets stigmatised or blemished.

== Cast ==
- Varun Dhawan as Zafar, Bahaar and Balraj's illegitimate son; Dev's half-brother; Roop's love interest
- Alia Bhatt as Roop Sami Chaudhry, Dharampal's daughter; Zafar's love interest; Dev's second wife; Balraj's second daughter-in-law; Bahaar's student
- Aditya Roy Kapur as Dev Chaudhry, Balraj's son; Satya and Roop's husband; Zafar's half-brother
- Sonakshi Sinha as Satya Chaudhry, Dev's first wife; Balraj's first daughter-in-law
- Madhuri Dixit as Bahaar Begum, Balraj's former love interest; Zafar's mother; Roop's teacher
- Sanjay Dutt as Balraj Chaudhry, Bahaar's former love interest; Dev and Zafar's father; Satya and Roop's father-in-law
- Kiara Advani as Lajjo, Zafar's friend and love interest; Bahaar's student
- Kunal Khemu as Abdul Khan, Zafar's friend
- Achint Kaur as Saroj, the Chaudhry family's housekeeper
- Pawan Chopra as Dharampal Sami, Roop's father; Dev's father-in-law
- Hiten Tejwani as Abbas Ahmed Razi, Dev's colleague
- Pavail Gulati as Aditya Khanna, a journalist who interviews and documents Roop's life story (special appearance)
- Kriti Sanon as a dancer in the song "Aira Gaira" (special appearance)

== Production ==
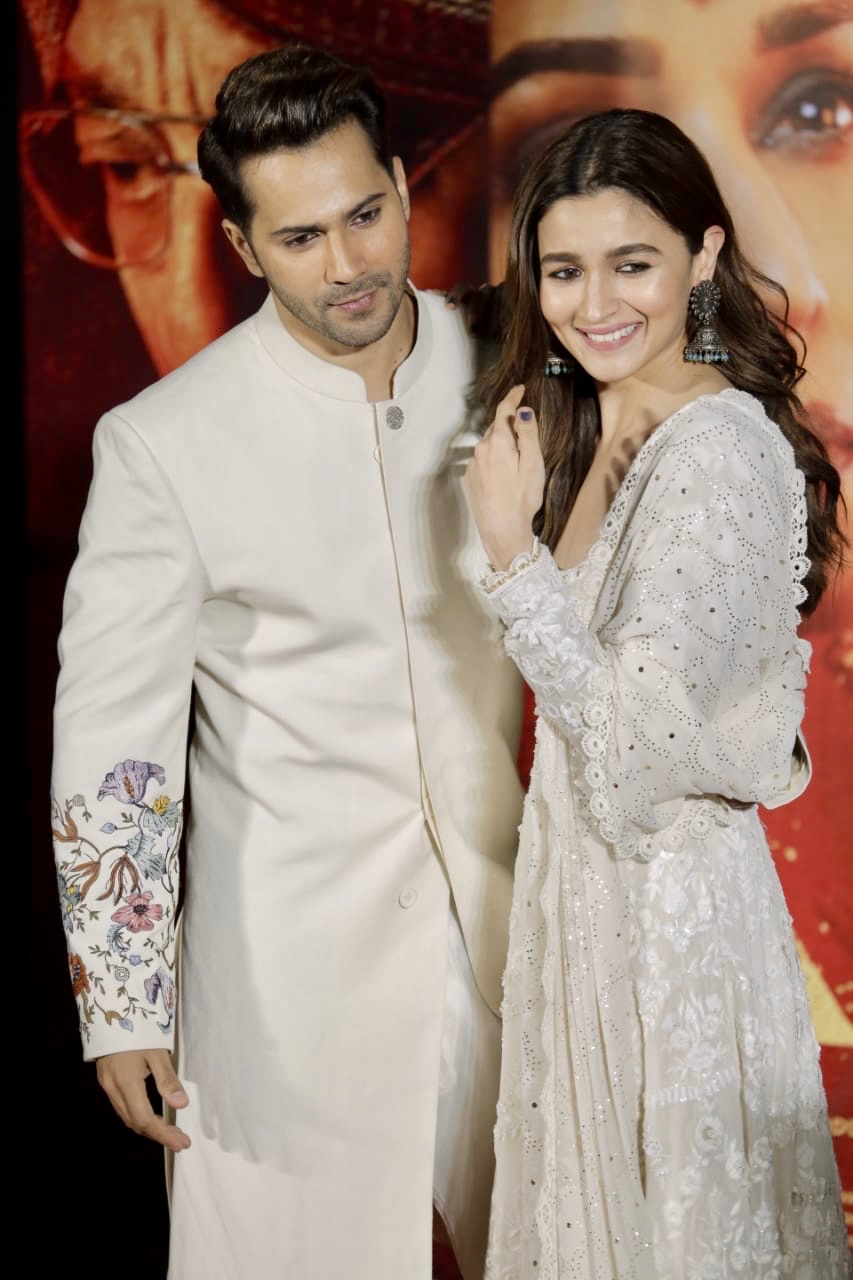
Varun Dhawan and Alia Bhatt promoting the film

=== Development ===
Kalank was conceived by Karan Johar and his father Yash Johar about 15 years prior to its release. Actress Sridevi was initially supposed to play the role of Bahaar Begum, but post her demise, the role was played by Madhuri Dixit. Production designer Amrita Mahal was brought on board to work on the production design and structure that represented Old Delhi mohalla with a mahal in Film City, Mumbai. Sajid Nadiadwala, owner and producer of Nadiadwala Grandson Entertainment, and Karan were present during the clap shot of Kalank. The estimated cost of the set was reportedly ₹15 crore. Nadiadwala and Sanjay Dutt collaborated after 24 years, having last worked on Andolan (1995).

=== Filming ===
Principal photography commenced in Film City, Mumbai on 18 April 2018. Madhuri Dixit and Aditya Roy Kapur joined the cast from 31 May 2018. Filming of an introductory song featuring Varun Dhawan, Alia Bhatt and Kiara Advani with nearly 500 backup dancers was completed on 7 May 2018. Rehearsals for a second dance number featuring Dhawan, Kapur and Kriti Sanon began on 31 May 2018. On 2 June 2018, a few leaked stills from the film showed Dixit donning an anarkali outfit and pasa/jhumar (hair jewellery). Sonakshi Sinha joined the cast from 14 June 2018 for a 15-day filming schedule. She is paired opposite Kapur in the film. The third schedule of filming was postponed due to injuries to Bhatt, Dhawan and Kapur and was rescheduled to commence two weeks later. Bhatt announced the film wrapped on 19 January 2019.

Kalank's budget has been inconsistently reported. The producers announced a budget of ₹150 crore, which includes print and advertising costs not typically included in budget figures. Other sources published budget estimates in the ₹80 crore range.

== Soundtrack ==
The soundtrack of Kalank is composed by Pritam Chakraborty, with lyrics penned by Amitabh Bhattacharya. The first single track "Ghar More Pardesiya" was released on 18 March 2019, followed by the second single "First Class" on 22 March 2019, and the third single "Kalank" on 30 March 2019. The fourth and fifth songs, "Tabaah Ho Gaye" and "Aira Gaira" was released 9 April 2019 and 13 April 2019, respectively. The entire soundtrack album was released by Zee Music Company on 22 March 2019.

== Release ==
=== Theatrical ===
Kalank was initially scheduled for release on 19 April 2019, but to reap the benefits of the extended weekend, the release date was preponed to 17 April 2019. A special screening of the film was organised for a selected audience on 14 April 2019 prior to its release. Kalank was certified by the British Board of Film Classification and Australian Classification Board with a runtime of 166 minutes and was released worldwide on 17 April. The film was released on 5,300 screens worldwide making it the widest Indian film release of 2019.

=== Home video ===
Kalank was made available as VOD on Amazon Prime Video in July 2019.

== Reception ==
=== Box office ===
Kalank had a bumper start at the box office, collecting ₹21.60 crore on opening day. The film went on to gross ₹95.65 crore in India and ₹50.66 crore from overseas markets with an overall worldwide gross of ₹146.31 crore. But dues to Avengers: Endgame around same time, it could not maintain the momentum & soon seeing a decline in revenue, and was declared as a box-office failure.

=== Critical response ===
Kalank received mixed reviews upon release, with praise for its soundtrack, cinematography, production design, costumes and performances of the ensemble cast, but criticism towards its direction, story, screenplay and length.

Rachit Gupta of The Times of India rated the film 3 stars out of 5 and remarked, "Kalank is a true labour of love that tells you a story laced with beautiful moments that will tug you at your heartstrings." He concluded his review writing that "Kalank is a visually stunning film topped with great performances." Anupama Chopra of Film Companion rated it with 3 stars out of 5 and opined "Kalank is likely to be the most visually stunning film of this year." She also remarked "The film is an operatic fantasy filled with staggering sets, swirling fabric and heartache, but to enjoy it, you must wholly suspend disbelief." Raja Sen writing for Hindustan Times rated the film with 2.5 stars out of 5 and praised Dixit, Bhatt and Dhawan for shining in a "stunning, but soulless" film. He felt that "it is a stunningly plated meal, but needed more salt". He remarked "Directed by Abhishek Varman and shot by the masterful Binod Pradhan, the makers of Kalank not only want every frame to be a painting, but every dialogue, a proverb, every scene, a portent. The result is beautiful but tedious, an opera that needed a stout songstress to warble through it midway." Taran Adarsh rated the film with 2 stars out of 5 and though he praised the star cast for their acting, he found the film "disappointing". Writing for The Indian Express, Shubhra Gupta gave it 1.5 star out of 5 and says, "Kalank doesn't really lift off the screen. The whole feels like a giant set, stately and ponderous and minus impact; the characters all costumed and perfumed and largely life-less, sparking only in bits and pieces."

Writing for NDTV, Saibal Chatterjee praised Dixit and Bhatt for their screen presence and concluded her extensive review as, "Kalank has unmistakable contemporary resonance because it celebrates the transformative power of love and reconciliation in a time of rampant discord. It is worth a viewing not only for what it says, but also for how it says it." Writing for the Scroll.in, Nandini Ramnath noted out that the film glamorised the partition by replicating kitsch aesthetic, and added, "The sets, that are meant to enhance the big-screen experience, end up creating a distance from the messiness of the emotional conflicts."

== Accolades ==
Event	Date of Ceremony	Category	Recipient	Result	Ref.
Filmfare Awards	15 February 2020	Best Supporting Actress	Madhuri Dixit	Nominated	
Filmfare Awards	15 February 2020	Best Music Director	Pritam	Nominated	
Filmfare Awards	15 February 2020	Best Lyricist	Amitabh Bhattacharya for "Kalank"	Nominated	
Filmfare Awards	15 February 2020	Best Male Playback Singer	Arijit Singh for "Kalank"	Won	
Filmfare Awards	15 February 2020	Best Female Playback Singer	Shreya Ghoshal and Vaishali Mhade for "Ghar More Pardesiya"	Nominated	
Filmfare Awards	15 February 2020	Best Choreography	Remo D'Souza for "Ghar More Pardesiya"	Won	
Filmfare Awards	15 February 2020	Best Choreography	Remo D'Souza and Saroj Khan for "Tabaah Ho Gaye"	Nominated	
Zee Cine Awards	13 March 2020	Best Music Director	Pritam	Nominated	
Zee Cine Awards	13 March 2020	Best Female Playback Singer	Shreya Ghoshal for "Ghar More Pardesiya"	Won	
Zee Cine Awards	13 March 2020	Best Song of the Year	"First Class"	Nominated	
Zee Cine Awards	13 March 2020	Best Production Design	Amrita Mahal	Won	
Zee Cine Awards	13 March 2020	Best Costume Design	Manish Malhotra	Won	
Screen Awards	8 December 2019	Best Female Playback Singer	Shreya Ghoshal and Vaishali Mhade for "Ghar More Pardesiya"	Won	
Screen Awards	8 December 2019	Best Female Playback Singer	Shreya Ghoshal for "Tabaah Ho Gaye"	Nominated	
Screen Awards	8 December 2019	Best Choreography	Remo D'Souza for "First Class"	Won	
Nickelodeon Kids' Choice Awards, India	5 January 2020	Favorite Actor	Varun Dhawan	Nominated	
Lions Gold Awards	24 January 2020	Best Villain (Critics)	Kunal Khemu	Won	
FOI Online Awards	11 February 2020	Best Music Director	Pritam	Nominated	
FOI Online Awards	11 February 2020	Best Female Playback Singer	Shreya Ghoshal and Vaishali Mhade for "Ghar More Pardesiya"	Nominated	
FOI Online Awards	11 February 2020	Best Choreography	Remo D'Souza for "Ghar More Pardesiya"	Won	
FOI Online Awards	11 February 2020	Best Choreography	Remo D'Souza and Saroj Khan for "Tabaah Ho Gaye"	Nominated	
FOI Online Awards	11 February 2020	Best Production Design	Amrita Mahal	Nominated	
