= Yeh Jawaani Hai Deewani (soundtrack) =

Soundtrack album by Pritam
- Released: 29 April 2013
- Recorded: 2013
- Genre: Filmi
- Length: 38:24
- Language: Hindi
- Label: T-Series
- Producer: Karan Johar

Pritam chronology
Murder 3 (2013)	Yeh Jawaani Hai Deewani (2013)	Once Upon ay Time in Mumbai Dobaara (2013)

Singles from Yeh Jawaani Hai Deewani
- 1. "Dilliwaali Girlfriend" Released: 26 April 2013; 2. "Balam Pichkari" Released: 29 April 2013; 3. "Kabira" Released: 29 April 2013; 4. "Ilahi" Released: 29 April 2013

Yeh Jawaani Hai Deewani is the soundtrack to the 2013 Hindi film of the same name directed by Ayan Mukerji. Produced by Karan Johar under Dharma Productions banner, the film starred Ranbir Kapoor and Deepika Padukone in lead roles, while Kalki Koechlin and Aditya Roy Kapur play supporting roles. The film's music and score is composed by Pritam with lyrics written by Amitabh Bhattacharya, except for one song written by Kumaar.

The album featured nine tracks in total and was released through T-Series on 29 April 2013. A day before the official album release, the album was made available exclusively on iTunes from 28 April for subscribers, and the audio jukebox was released on YouTube the same day, while the songs were later launched through digital and physical formats. The soundtrack received acclaim from both critics and audiences, praising the compositions, lyrics, choice of singers and the commercial value of the album. The tracks "Badtameez Dil" and "Balam Pichkari" became a chartbusters and repeatedly played in festivals and celebrations, while other tracks also topped music charts. As of January 2022, the album has more than 2.6 billion views on YouTube.

In addition to the commercial response, it received several nominations and awards at various ceremonies. The album won one award each at the Zee Cine, Mirchi Music and International Indian Film Academy Awards, two Star Screen and Producers Guild Film Awards each and three Global Indian Music Academy Awards. It received four Filmfare Award nominations, but did not win in any category.

== Development ==
In December 2011, Pritam was chosen as the film's music director, thereby making his maiden association with Dharma Productions, and also replacing their usual collaborators: musicians Vishal–Shekhar and Shankar–Ehsaan–Loy. The album consisted of seven original tracks and two alternative versions. The lyrics for the tracks were written by Amitabh Bhattacharya and Kumaar, and vocals for the tracks were provided by Benny Dayal, Shefali Alvares, Vishal Dadlani, Shalmali Kholgade, Arijit Singh, Rekha Bhardwaj, Tochi Raina, Sunidhi Chauhan, Sreerama Chandra, Shilpa Rao, Nakash Aziz, Harshdeep Kaur and Mohit Chauhan. Azeem Dayani handled the supervision for the film's soundtrack.

In an interview with Akshay Manwani of Scroll.in, Bhattacharya called it as "a fun album" and went on to say "I love writing albums, which have that entire spectrum, the entire range of moods. Yeh Jawaani Hai Deewani was one such album. If it has a ‘Budtameez Dil’ or a ‘Balam Pichkaari’, then it has an ‘Ilaahi’ or a ‘Kabira’ as well [...] I have created the entire mood for the songs in these films. The same has been done by the composer."

Several social media users, criticised that the "Badtameez Dil" is copied from the Bengali folk number "Ranjana Ami Ar Ashbona". Defending the track, playback singer Benny Dayal had said that: "Everyone is enjoying the track which is the positive side of stuff; rather than looking at the negative side you should look at the positive side. The truth will be out at any point of time so there is no point of accusing someone. I am aware of the allegation on Pritam and heard all the tracks of the Bengali film. But I am not sure if it is a copy or not."

The track "Kabira" is a Sufi number, which has two versions. This track, along with Pritam's other song, "Kamli" from Dhoom 3 (2013), served as inspiration for the track "Bulleya" for another Ranbir Kapoor-starrer Ae Dil Hai Mushkil (2016), also composed by Pritam. "Ilahi", sung by Arijit Singh is a travel number. Madhuri Dixit, appeared in the special dance number "Ghagra". For the mastering of the album, Pritam said that "for that film, I gave a master to T-Series and the next day I got a better one so I wanted to change it. They said no but I kept pleading. They finally agreed but were not able to change the New Zealand iTunes version which went live first because of the time difference. Now all the pirates got that master. So I tried to contact them to use the new version." A mashup of all the tracks were released as an additional single on 5 July 2013.

== Track listing ==
Track listing
No.	Title	Singer(s)	Length
1.	"Badtameez Dil"	Benny Dayal, Shefali Alvares	4:13
2.	"Balam Pichkari"	Vishal Dadlani, Shalmali Kholgade	4:50
3.	"Ilahi"	Arijit Singh	3:46
4.	"Kabira"	Rekha Bhardwaj, Tochi Raina	3:42
5.	"Dilliwaali Girlfriend"	Arijit Singh, Sunidhi Chauhan	4:18
6.	"Subhanallah"	Sreerama Chandra, Shilpa Rao	4:09
7.	"Ghagra"	Vishal Dadlani, Rekha Bhardwaj	5:03
8.	"Kabira" (Encore)	Arijit Singh, Harshdeep Kaur	4:28
9.	"Ilahi" (Reprise)	Mohit Chauhan	3:55
Total length:			38:24

== Reception ==
The music received exceptionally positive response from critics. Critic-based at NDTV (published by Indo-Asian News Service) called the film's soundtrack as "impressive, young and crazy" and wrote "High on energy and beats, it's an out and out fun and masti album. Though the inclination is towards vibrant and youthful compositions, it does have its share of emotional songs." He concluded the review saying that the album is "a must hear for all music enthusiasts". Bollywood Hungama gave 4 out of 5 stars and said: "Music is the key to the success of a romantic film and in that respect, Yeh Jaawani Hai Deewani is extremely fortunate to have a foot-tapping music score that will take the film places. In most tracks Pritam is in his element and carries on the mega-musical heritage of Dharma Productions' best musicals, a legacy that began with Dostana (1980)." The Indian Express-based critic Sankhayan Ghosh called the track "Badtameez Dil" as the standout from the album. Vipin Nair of Music Aloud stated "After an unimpressive couple of soundtracks earlier this year, Pritam regains his footing with Yeh Jawaani Hai Deewani" and gave 7.5/10 to the album.

== Chart performance ==
The album was considered as one of the "Best Bollywood Albums of 2013" by Indiatimes (Anand Vaishnav), Deccan Music and Milliblog (Karthik Srinivasan). The tracks "Badtameez Dil" and "Balam Pichkari" received huge consumer response and also featured in year-end lists. Deccan Music listed the track "Balam Pichkari" in #27 of "Best Bollywood Songs of 2013", while Milliblog's Karthik Srinivasan and Music Aloud-based Vipin Nair listed "Badtameez Bil" in their year-ender reports as one of the "Best Bollywood Songs of 2013" (#8 and #22). Hindustan Times listed the track "Badtameez Dil" in their year-ender review calling the track as "fun and peppy, which describes the film and its music". The Indian Express also mentioned the album as "full of fun, frolic, celebration and innocent naughtiness". Firstpost-based critic Akshay Manwani, listed it as one of the Best Bollywood Albums of the Decade and further went on to state it as "an album with a distinctly youthful vibe, but one which is also rich with substance". Ormax Media, included the album along with Pritam's two other compositions — Barfi! (2012) and Ae Dil Hai Mushkil (2016) — as one of the "decade's best Bollywood albums". (Note: Both films had Ranbir Kapoor playing the leading role)

Chart(s)	Song	Position	Ref.
Radio Mirchi Top 100	"Badtameez Dil"	2	
Radio Mirchi Top 100	"Balam Pichkari"	11	
Radio Mirchi Top 100	"Kabira"	22	
Radio Mirchi Top 100	"Ilahi"	38	
Radio Mirchi Top 100	"Dilliwaali Girlfriend"	45	
News18 Top 21 Songs	"Badtameez Dil"	3	
NDTV Top 10	"Badtameez Dil"	3	
NDTV Top 10	"Balam Pichkari"	4	

== Accolades ==
Award (Note: Awards, festivals and organisations are in alphabetical order.)	Date of Ceremony (Note: Date is linked to the article about the awards held that year, wherever possible.)	Category	Recipient(s) and nominee(s)	Result	Ref.
BIG Star Entertainment Awards	18 December 2013	Most Entertaining Song	"Balam Pichkari"	Nominated	
BIG Star Entertainment Awards	18 December 2013	Most Entertaining Song	"Dilliwaali Girlfriend"	Nominated	
BIG Star Entertainment Awards	18 December 2013	Most Entertaining Music Director	Pritam	Nominated	
BIG Star Entertainment Awards	18 December 2013	Most Entertaining Singer (Male)	Vishal Dadlani (for the song "Balam Pichkari")	Nominated	
BIG Star Entertainment Awards	18 December 2013	Most Entertaining Singer (Female)	Rekha Bharadwaj (for the song "Ghagra")	Nominated	
BIG Star Entertainment Awards	18 December 2013	Most Entertaining Singer (Female)	Sunidhi Chauhan (for the song "Dilliwaali Girlfriend")	Nominated	
Bollywood Hungama Surfer's Choice Movie and Music Awards	5 March 2014	Best Soundtrack	Yeh Jawaani Hai Deewani	Nominated	
Bollywood Hungama Surfer's Choice Movie and Music Awards	5 March 2014	Best Song	"Balam Pichkari"	Nominated	
Bollywood Hungama Surfer's Choice Movie and Music Awards	5 March 2014	Best Song	"Badtameez Dil"	Nominated	
Bollywood Hungama Surfer's Choice Movie and Music Awards	5 March 2014	Best Music Video	"Balam Pichkari"	Nominated	
Bollywood Hungama Surfer's Choice Movie and Music Awards	5 March 2014	Best Music Video	"Badtameez Dil"	Nominated	
Bollywood Hungama Surfer's Choice Movie and Music Awards	5 March 2014	Best Music Director	Pritam	Nominated	
Bollywood Hungama Surfer's Choice Movie and Music Awards	5 March 2014	Best Lyricist	Amitabh Bhattacharya	Nominated	
Bollywood Hungama Surfer's Choice Movie and Music Awards	5 March 2014	Best Male Playback Singer	Arijit Singh (for the song "Ilahi")	Nominated	
Bollywood Hungama Surfer's Choice Movie and Music Awards	5 March 2014	Best Male Playback Singer	Benny Dayal (for the song "Badtameez Dil")	Nominated	
Bollywood Hungama Surfer's Choice Movie and Music Awards	5 March 2014	Best Female Playback Singer	Sunidhi Chauhan (for the song "Dilliwaali Girlfriend")	Nominated	
Bollywood Hungama Surfer's Choice Movie and Music Awards	5 March 2014	Best Female Playback Singer	Shalmali Kholgade (for the song "Balam Pichkari")	Nominated	
Bollywood Hungama Surfer's Choice Movie and Music Awards	5 March 2014	Best Choreography	Remo D'Souza	Nominated	
Filmfare Awards	24 January 2014	Best Music Director	Pritam	Nominated	
Filmfare Awards	24 January 2014	Best Lyricist	Amitabh Bhattacharya	Nominated	
Filmfare Awards	24 January 2014	Best Male Playback Singer	Benny Dayal (for the song "Badtameez Dil")	Nominated	
Filmfare Awards	24 January 2014	Best Female Playback Singer	Shalmali Kholgade (for the song "Balam Pichkari")	Nominated	
Global Indian Music Academy Awards	20 January 2014	Best Film Album	Yeh Jawaani Hai Deewani	Nominated	
Global Indian Music Academy Awards	20 January 2014	Best Film Song	"Badtameez Dil"	Nominated	
Global Indian Music Academy Awards	20 January 2014	Best Music Director	Pritam	Won	
Global Indian Music Academy Awards	20 January 2014	Best Background Score	Pritam	Nominated	
Global Indian Music Academy Awards	20 January 2014	Best Lyricist	Amitabh Bhattacharya (for the song "Kabira")	Nominated	
Global Indian Music Academy Awards	20 January 2014	Best Male Playback Singer	Benny Dayal (for the song "Badtameez Dil")	Nominated	
Global Indian Music Academy Awards	20 January 2014	Best Male Playback Singer	Tochi Raina (for the song "Kabira")	Nominated	
Global Indian Music Academy Awards	20 January 2014	Best Duet	Tochi Raina, Rekha Bhardwaj (for the song "Kabira")	Won	
Global Indian Music Academy Awards	20 January 2014	Best Engineer	Sunny M.R	Nominated	
Global Indian Music Academy Awards	20 January 2014	Best Music Arranger and Programmer	Hyacinth D’Souza, DJ Phukan, Sunny M.R, Nikhil Paul George (for the song "Badtameez Dil")	Won	
International Indian Film Academy Awards	23 April 2014	Best Music Director	Pritam	Nominated	
International Indian Film Academy Awards	23 April 2014	Best Choreography	Remo D'Souza	Won	
IBNLive Movie Awards	5 February 2014	Best Music Director	Pritam	Nominated	
IBNLive Movie Awards	5 February 2014	Best Male Playback Singer	Tochi Raina (for the song "Kabira")	Nominated	
IBNLive Movie Awards	5 February 2014	Best Female Playback Singer	Shalmali Kholgade (for the song "Balam Pichkari")	Nominated	
Mirchi Music Awards	27 February 2014	Album of The Year	Yeh Jawaani Hai Deewani	Nominated	
Mirchi Music Awards	27 February 2014	Song of The Year	"Badtameez Dil"	Nominated	
Mirchi Music Awards	27 February 2014	Music Composer of The Year	Pritam	Nominated	
Mirchi Music Awards	27 February 2014	Lyricist of The Year	Amitabh Bhattacharya	Nominated	
Mirchi Music Awards	27 February 2014	Male Vocalist of The Year	Benny Dayal (for the song "Badtameez Dil")	Nominated	
Mirchi Music Awards	27 February 2014	Song Representing Sufi Tradition	"Kabira"	Nominated	
Mirchi Music Awards	27 February 2014	Best Background Score	Pritam	Nominated	
Mirchi Music Awards	27 February 2014	Programmer & Arranger of the Year	Hyacinth D’Souza, DJ Phukan, Sunny M.R, Nikhil Paul George (for the song "Badtameez Dil")	Won	
Producers Guild Film Awards	16 January 2014	Best Music	Pritam	Won	
Producers Guild Film Awards	16 January 2014	Best Lyrics	Amitabh Bhattacharya	Nominated	
Producers Guild Film Awards	16 January 2014	Best Female Playback Singer	Rekha Bharadwaj	Nominated	
Producers Guild Film Awards	16 January 2014	Best Choreography	Remo D'Souza	Won	
Star Screen Awards	14 January 2014	Best Music	Pritam	Won	
Star Screen Awards	14 January 2014	Best Male Playback Singer	Benny Dayal (for the song "Badtameez Dil")	Nominated	
Star Screen Awards	14 January 2014	Best Female Playback Singer	Shalmali Kholgade (for the song "Balam Pichkari")	Nominated	
Star Screen Awards	14 January 2014	Best Lyrics	Amitabh Bhattacharya (for the song "Balam Pichkari")	Nominated	
Star Screen Awards	14 January 2014	Best Choreography	Remo D'Souza (for the song "Badtameez Dil")	Won	
Zee Cine Awards	8 February 2014	Song of the Year	"Balam Pichkari"	Nominated	
Zee Cine Awards	8 February 2014	Song of the Year	"Badtameez Dil"	Nominated	
Zee Cine Awards	8 February 2014	Best Music	Pritam	Nominated	
Zee Cine Awards	8 February 2014	Best Background Score	Pritam	Won	
Zee Cine Awards	8 February 2014	Best Lyrics	Amitabh Bhattacharya (for the song "Kabira")	Nominated	
Zee Cine Awards	8 February 2014	Best Female Playback Singer	Shalmali Kholgade (for the song "Balam Pichkari")	Nominated	
Zee Cine Awards	8 February 2014	Best Sound Design	Nakul Kamte	Nominated	
