= List of accolades received by Yeh Jawaani Hai Deewani =

Yeh Jawaani Hai Deewani awards and nominations
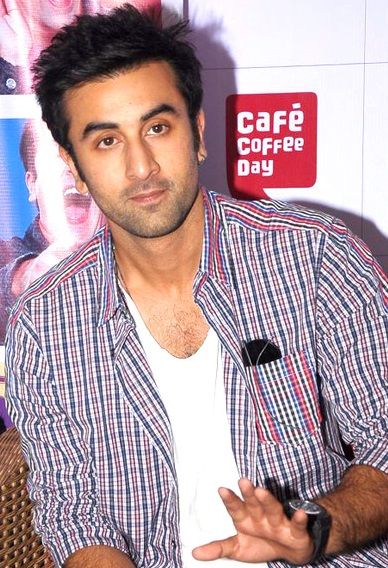
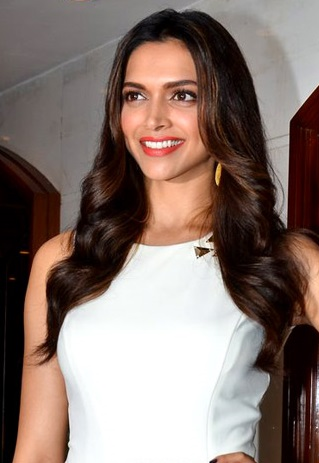
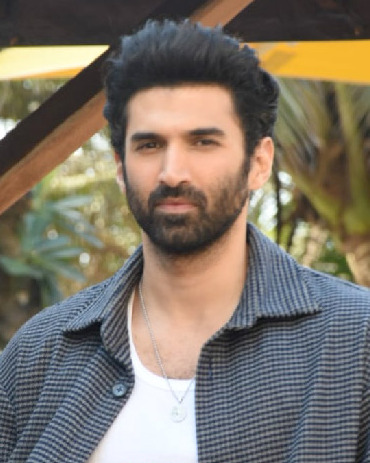
- Ranbir Kapoor, Deepika Padukone and Aditya Roy Kapur garnered several awards and nominations for their performance in Yeh Jawaani Hai Deewani.
Awards and nominations
Award	Wins	Nominations

Totals (Note: Certain award groups do not simply award one winner. They acknowledge several different recipients, have runners-up, and have third place. Since this is a specific recognition and is different from losing an award, runner-up mentions are considered wins in this award tally. For simplification and to avoid errors, each award in this list has been presumed to have had a prior nomination.)
- Wins: 18
- Nominations: 76

Yeh Jawaani Hai Deewani (transl. This youth is crazy), also abbreviated as YJHD, is a 2013 Indian Hindi-language coming-of-age romantic comedy-drama film directed by Ayan Mukerji, written by Mukerji and Hussain Dalal, edited by Akiv Ali and produced by Karan Johar under Dharma Productions. It stars Deepika Padukone and Ranbir Kapoor in their second film together, alongside Kalki Koechlin and Aditya Roy Kapur.

The story revolves around two people who meet during a trekking trip where one falls in love with the other but refrains from expressing it. They soon drift apart but end up meeting again at a friend's wedding. The film score and soundtrack album were composed by Pritam with cinematography by V. Manikandan. Yeh Jawaani Hai Deewani was a major box office success grossing over ₹319.6 crore.

At the 59th Filmfare Awards, Yeh Jawaani Hai Deewani received a leading 10 nominations, including Best Actor (Kapoor), Best Actress (Padukone), Best Supporting Actress (Koechlin) and Best Supporting Actor (Roy Kapur). At the 15th IIFA Awards, it received 8 nominations and won 3 awards including Best Supporting Actor (Roy Kapur).

== Awards and nominations ==
Award	Date of ceremony (Note: Date is linked to the article about the awards held that year, wherever possible.)	Category	Recipient(s)	Result	Ref(s)
BIG Star Entertainment Awards	18 December 2013	Most Entertaining Film of the Year	Yeh Jawaani Hai Deewani	Won	
BIG Star Entertainment Awards	18 December 2013	Most Entertaining Romantic Film	Yeh Jawaani Hai Deewani	Nominated	
BIG Star Entertainment Awards	18 December 2013	Best Entertaining Film	Yeh Jawaani Hai Deewani	Won	
BIG Star Entertainment Awards	18 December 2013	Most Entertaining Director	Ayan Mukerji	Nominated	
BIG Star Entertainment Awards	18 December 2013	Most Entertaining Actor (Film) – Male	Ranbir Kapoor	Nominated	
BIG Star Entertainment Awards	18 December 2013	Most Entertaining Actor in a Romantic Film – Male	Ranbir Kapoor	Nominated	
BIG Star Entertainment Awards	18 December 2013	Most Entertaining Dancer	Ranbir Kapoor (for "Dilliwaali Girlfriend")	Nominated	
BIG Star Entertainment Awards	18 December 2013	Most Entertaining Actor (Film) – Female	Deepika Padukone	Nominated	
BIG Star Entertainment Awards	18 December 2013	Most Entertaining Actor in a Romantic Film – Female	Deepika Padukone	Nominated	
BIG Star Entertainment Awards	18 December 2013	Most Entertaining Music	Pritam	Nominated	
BIG Star Entertainment Awards	18 December 2013	Most Entertaining Song	"Balam Pichkari"	Nominated	
BIG Star Entertainment Awards	18 December 2013	Most Entertaining Song	"Dilliwaali Girlfriend"	Nominated	
BIG Star Entertainment Awards	18 December 2013	Most Entertaining Singer (Male)	Vishal Dadlani (for "Balam Pichkari")	Nominated	
BIG Star Entertainment Awards	18 December 2013	Most Entertaining Singer (Female)	Rekha Bharadwaj (for "Ghagra")	Nominated	
BIG Star Entertainment Awards	18 December 2013	Most Entertaining Singer (Female)	Sunidhi Chauhan (for "Dilliwaali Girlfriend")	Nominated	
ETC Bollywood Business Awards	2014	The 100 Crore Club	Yeh Jawaani Hai Deewani	Won	
ETC Bollywood Business Awards	2014	Highest Grossing Actor - Female	Deepika Padukone (Note: Also for Chennai Express and Goliyon Ki Raasleela Ram-Leela)	Won	
Filmfare Awards	24 January 2014	Best Film	Yeh Jawaani Hai Deewani	Nominated	
Filmfare Awards	24 January 2014	Best Director	Ayan Mukerji	Nominated	
Filmfare Awards	24 January 2014	Best Actor	Ranbir Kapoor	Nominated	
Filmfare Awards	24 January 2014	Best Actress	Deepika Padukone	Nominated	
Filmfare Awards	24 January 2014	Best Supporting Actor	Aditya Roy Kapur	Nominated	
Filmfare Awards	24 January 2014	Best Supporting Actress	Kalki Koechlin	Nominated	
Filmfare Awards	24 January 2014	Best Music Director	Pritam	Nominated	
Filmfare Awards	24 January 2014	Best Lyricist	Amitabh Bhattacharya (for "Kabira")	Nominated	
Filmfare Awards	24 January 2014	Best Male Playback Singer	Benny Dayal (for "Badtameez Dil")	Nominated	
Filmfare Awards	24 January 2014	Best Female Playback Singer	Shalmali Kholgade (for "Balam Pichkari")	Nominated	
International Indian Film Academy Awards	23 April 2014	Best Film	Yeh Jawaani Hai Deewani	Nominated	
International Indian Film Academy Awards	23 April 2014	Best Director	Ayan Mukerji	Nominated	
International Indian Film Academy Awards	23 April 2014	Best Actor	Ranbir Kapoor	Nominated	
International Indian Film Academy Awards	23 April 2014	Best Actress	Deepika Padukone	Nominated	
International Indian Film Academy Awards	23 April 2014	Best Supporting Actor	Aditya Roy Kapur	Won	
International Indian Film Academy Awards	23 April 2014	Best Supporting Actress	Kalki Koechlin	Nominated	
International Indian Film Academy Awards	23 April 2014	Best Music Director	Pritam	Nominated	
International Indian Film Academy Awards	23 April 2014	Best Choreography	Remo D'Souza (for "Badtameez Dil")	Won	
International Indian Film Academy Awards	23 April 2014	Jodi of the Year	Ranbir Kapoor & Deepika Padukone	Won	
Mirchi Music Awards	27 February 2014	Programmer & Arranger of the Year	Hyacinth D’Souza, DJ Phukan, Sunny M.R. & Nikhil Paul George (for "Badtameez Dil")	Won	
Producers Guild Film Awards	16 January 2014	Best Director	Ayan Mukerji	Nominated	
Producers Guild Film Awards	16 January 2014	Best Screenplay	Ayan Mukerji	Nominated	
Producers Guild Film Awards	16 January 2014	Best Actor in a Leading Role	Ranbir Kapoor	Nominated	
Producers Guild Film Awards	16 January 2014	Best Actress in a Leading Role	Deepika Padukone	Nominated	
Producers Guild Film Awards	16 January 2014	Best Actor in a Supporting Role	Aditya Roy Kapur	Nominated	
Producers Guild Film Awards	16 January 2014	Best Actress in a Supporting Role	Kalki Koechlin	Nominated	
Producers Guild Film Awards	16 January 2014	Best Music Director	Pritam	Won	
Producers Guild Film Awards	16 January 2014	Best Lyricist	Amitabh Bhattacharya (for "Kabira")	Nominated	
Producers Guild Film Awards	16 January 2014	Best Female Playback Singer	Rekha Bharadwaj (for "Kabira")	Nominated	
Producers Guild Film Awards	16 January 2014	Best Dialogues	Hussain Dalal	Won	
Producers Guild Film Awards	16 January 2014	Best Choreography	Remo D'Souza (for "Badtameez Dil" & "Balam Pichkari")	Won	
Producers Guild Film Awards	16 January 2014	Hall of Fame	Yeh Jawaani Hai Deewani	Won	
Screen Awards	14 January 2014	Best Film	Yeh Jawaani Hai Deewani	Nominated	
Screen Awards	14 January 2014	Best Director	Ayan Mukerji	Nominated	
Screen Awards	14 January 2014	Best Actor	Ranbir Kapoor	Nominated	
Screen Awards	14 January 2014	Best Actor (Popular Choice)	Ranbir Kapoor	Nominated	
Screen Awards	14 January 2014	Best Actress (Popular Choice)	Deepika Padukone	Nominated	
Screen Awards	14 January 2014	Best Supporting Actress	Kalki Koechlin	Nominated	
Screen Awards	14 January 2014	Best Music Director	Pritam	Won	
Screen Awards	14 January 2014	Best Lyricist	Amitabh Bhattacharya (for "Balam Pichkari")	Nominated	
Screen Awards	14 January 2014	Best Male Playback	Benny Dayal (for "Badtameez Dil")	Nominated	
Screen Awards	14 January 2014	Best Female Playback	Shalmali Kholgade (for "Balam Pichkari")	Nominated	
Screen Awards	14 January 2014	Best Choreography	Remo D'Souza (for "Badtameez Dil")	Won	
Zee Cine Awards	8 February 2014	Best Film	Yeh Jawaani Hai Deewani	Nominated	
Zee Cine Awards	8 February 2014	Best Director	Ayan Mukerji	Won	
Zee Cine Awards	8 February 2014	Best Screenplay	Ayan Mukerji	Won	
Zee Cine Awards	8 February 2014	Best Story	Ayan Mukerji	Nominated	
Zee Cine Awards	8 February 2014	Best Dialogues	Ayan Mukerji	Nominated	
Zee Cine Awards	8 February 2014	Best Actor – Male	Ranbir Kapoor	Nominated	
Zee Cine Awards	8 February 2014	Best Actor – Female	Deepika Padukone	Nominated	
Zee Cine Awards	8 February 2014	Best Actor in a Supporting Role – Male	Aditya Roy Kapur	Nominated	
Zee Cine Awards	8 February 2014	Song of the Year	"Badtameez Dil"	Nominated	
Zee Cine Awards	8 February 2014	Song of the Year	"Balam Pichkari"	Nominated	
Zee Cine Awards	8 February 2014	Best Music Director	Pritam	Nominated	
Zee Cine Awards	8 February 2014	Best Background Music	Pritam	Won	
Zee Cine Awards	8 February 2014	Best Lyricist	Amitabh Bhattacharya (for "Kabira")	Nominated	
Zee Cine Awards	8 February 2014	Best Female Playback Singer	Shalmali Kholgade (for "Balam Pichkari")	Nominated	
Zee Cine Awards	8 February 2014	Best Sound Design	Nakul Kamte	Nominated	
Zee Cine Awards	8 February 2014	Best Editing	Akiv Ali	Nominated	
Zee Cine Awards	8 February 2014	Best Choreography	Remo D'Souza (for "Badtameez Dil")	Won	
