= GiMA Award for Best Duet =

The GiMA Best Duet is given by Global Indian Music Academy as a part of its annual Global Indian Music Academy Awards.

== List of winners ==
- 2014 Rekha Bhardwaj & Tochi Raina for "Kabira" – Yeh Jawaani Hai Deewani
  - Mili Nair & Amit Trivedi for "Meethi Boliyaan" – Kai Po Che!
  - Shreya Ghoshal & Javed Bashir for "O Rangrezz" – Bhaag Milkha Bhaag
  - Palak Muchhal & Arijit Singh for "Chahun Main Ya Naa" – Aashiqui 2
  - Shalmali Kholgade & Vishal Dadlani for "Balam Pichakari" – Yeh Jawaani Hai Deewaani

- 2015 Arijit Singh & Shreya Ghoshal for "Samjhawan" – Humpty Sharma Ki Dulhania
  - Shreya Ghoshal & Arijit Singh for "Manwa Laage" – Happy New Year
  - Chinmayi & Shekhar Ravjiani for "Zehnaseeb" – Hasee Toh Phasee
  - Neeti Mohan & Benny Dayal for "Bang Bang" – Bang Bang!
  - Sunidhi Chauhan & Javed Ali for "Daawat-e-Ishq" – Daawat-e-Ishq

- 2016 Arijit Singh & Tulsi Kumar for "Soch Na Sake" – Airlift
  - Shreya Ghoshal & Vaishali Mhade for "Pinga" – Bajirao Mastani
  - Shreya Ghoshal & Sonu Nigam for "Tere Bin" – Wazir
  - Divya Kumar & Priya Saraiya for "Sunn Saathiya" – ABCD 2
  - Armaan Malik & Neeti Mohan for "Tumhe Apna Banane Ka" – Hate Story 3
  - Swati Sharma & Brijesh Sandilya for "Banno Tera Swagger" – Tanu Weds Manu Returns

== See also ==
- Bollywood
- Cinema of India
