= Ilahi =

2013 Hindi song

Song by Pritam, Mohit Chauhan, Arijit Singh

from the album Yeh Jawaani Hai Deewani
- Released: 29 April 2013
- Genre: Indian pop; Celtic
- Length: 3:51
- Label: T-Series
- Composer: Pritam
- Lyricist: Amitabh Bhattacharya

Yeh Jawaani Hai Deewani track listing
- 1. "Badtameez Dil"; 2. "Balam Pichkari"; 3. "Ilahi"; 4. "Kabira"; 5. "Dilliwaali Girlfriend"; 6. "Subhanallah"; 7. "Ghagra"; 8. "Kabira (Encore)"; 9. "Ilahi (Reprise)"

Music video
- "Ilahi" on YouTube

Ilahi is an Indian travel song from the 2013 Hindi film, Yeh Jawaani Hai Deewani. The track is composed by Pritam Chakraborty, with lyrics by Amitabh Bhattacharya. Sung by Arijit Singh, the music video of the track features actor Ranbir Kapoor. A reprise version of the same song was released as part of the film soundtrack, which was rendered by Mohit Chauhan.

== Background ==
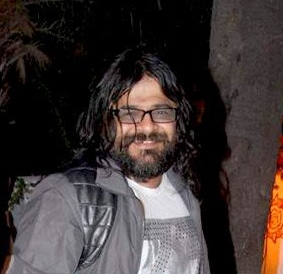
The song is composed by Pritam marking his first collaboration with Dharma Productions.

The music for the song is composed by Pritam, marking his first venture as a composer in a Dharma Productions. Pritam and Ranbir Kapoor had earlier collaborated in films like Ajab Prem Ki Ghazab Kahani (2009), Raajneeti (2010) and Barfi! (2012). On 31 July 2012, reports suggested that Mohit Chauhan will be lending his voice for a song that features Kapoor, whom he had previously dubbed in Rockstar (2011) and Barfi! (2012). The original version which is sung by Arijit Singh is composed with heightened tempo and the musical arrangements are slightly different within the two versions.

Apart from the song "Ilahi", Singh recorded two other tracks for the album of the film, "Dilliwaali Girlfriend" along with Sunidhi Chauhan and Kabira alongside Harshdeep Kaur. In the film, Kapoor portrayed a character named Bunny, whose dream is to wander and explore the world. The song is picturised as how Bunny works as a videographer for a travel show and travels the world, as he had planned. Kapoor had earlier worked with Ayan Mukerji in 2009 Bollywood film, Wake Up Sid. The lyrics of the song which is penned by Amitabh Bhattacharya mainly focuses on the unconstrained and carefree attitude of the protagonist who is filled with life.

== Release and response ==
The song was released digitally as a part of the soundtrack of film on 29 April 2013. Stills of the song which features Kapoor with a beard, was revealed on 5 May 2013, along with the music video of the song Kabira. The music video of the song was officially released on 6 June 2013, through the YouTube channel of T-Series. The official music video of the song has over 300 Millions views as of March 2025.

== Critical reception ==
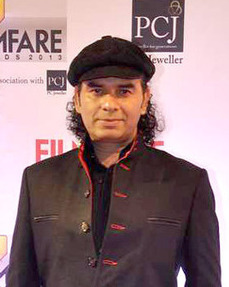
Chauhan, singer of the reprise version.

Bollywood Hungama's Rajiv Vijayakar calling the song "a phonetic delight" thought it is a song that is "clearly meant to rivet the listener only with its hooks and catchy riffs". Reviewers from IBNLive wrote: "A simple song, sung by Arijit Singh. It has chorus by children singing in background brings freshness to it". Sankhayan Ghosh of The Indian Express praised the vocals by Singh as "confident".

Writing for Koimoi, Mohar Basu appraised the vocals by Chauhan and picked the version over original. He wrote: "The song is a perfect synthesis of correct energy quotient, with right amount of voice balance. As always Mohit Chauhan is a show stellar and this song repackages all his best qualities in a fine concoction". Reviewers from IBNLive wrote: "It's faster than the original, otherwise the rest of the elements are similar to the original". Bollywood Hungama's Rajiv Vijayakar found the version a "bit toned down but much more feelingly sung" than the original.
