= 59th Filmfare Awards =

2014 awards for Hindi cinema

- 59th Filmfare Awards
- Date: 26 January 2014
- Site: Yash Raj Studio, Mumbai
- Hosted by: Priyanka Chopra; Ranbir Kapoor; Shah Rukh Khan; Karan Johar; Sonakshi Sinha
- Official website: www.filmfare.com

Highlights
- Best Film: Bhaag Milkha Bhaag
- Critics Award for Best Film: The Lunchbox
- Most awards: Bhaag Milkha Bhaag (6)
- Most nominations: Yeh Jawaani Hai Deewani (10)

Television coverage
- Network: Sony Entertainment Television (India)

The 59th Filmfare Awards were held to honor the best films of 2013 from the Hindi-language (Bollywood) film industry. The nominations were announced on 13 January 2014. The ceremony that was held on 24 January 2014 (telecasted on 26 January 2014) was hosted by Priyanka Chopra and Ranbir Kapoor.

Yeh Jawaani Hai Deewani led the ceremony with 10 nominations, followed by Aashiqui 2, Bhaag Milkha Bhaag, Goliyon Ki Raasleela Ram-Leela and Raanjhanaa with 8 nominations each.

Bhaag Milkha Bhaag won 6 awards, including Best Film, Best Director (for Rakeysh Omprakash Mehra) and Best Actor (for Farhan Akhtar), thus becoming the most-awarded film at the ceremony.

Deepika Padukone received triple nominations for Best Actress for her performances in Chennai Express, Goliyon Ki Raasleela Ram-Leela and Yeh Jawaani Hai Deewani, winning for Goliyon Ki Raasleela Ram-Leela.

Real-life couple Pankaj Kapur and Supriya Pathak were both nominated for Best Supporting Actor and Best Supporting Actress respectively, for their performances in Matru Ki Bijlee Ka Mandola and Goliyon Ki Raasleela Ram-Leela, with Pathak winning her category.

== Winners and nominees ==
The nominees for the 59th Filmfare Awards were announced on 13 January 2014.

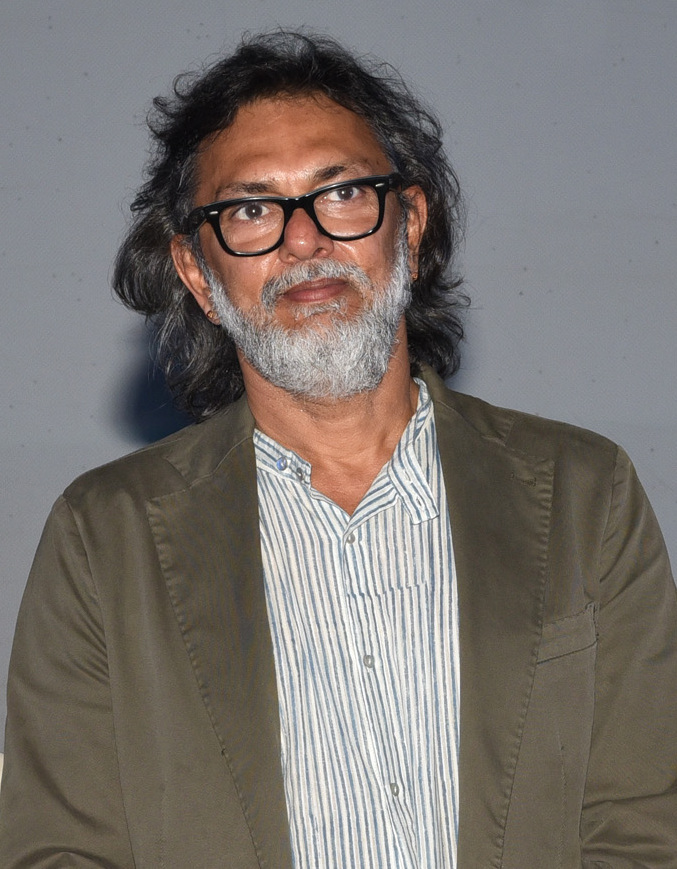
Rakeysh Omprakash Mehra, Best Director

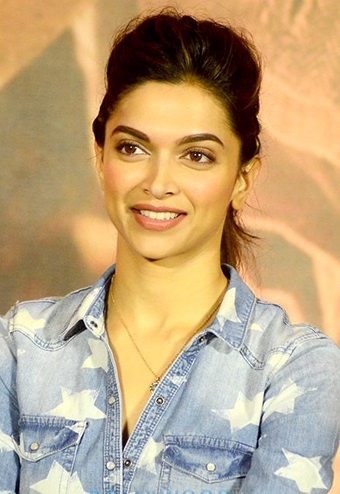
Deepika Padukone, Best Actress

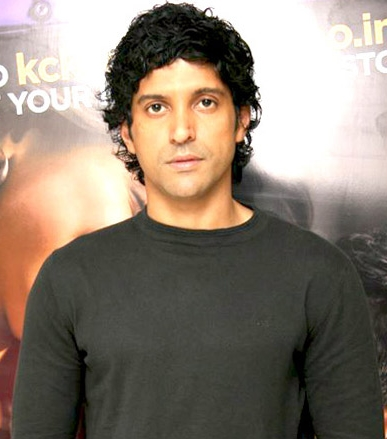
Farhan Akhtar, Best Actor

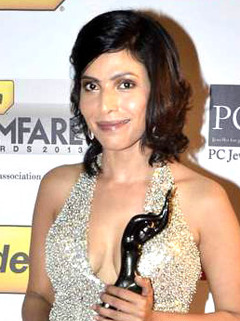
Shilpa Shukla, Best Actress Critics

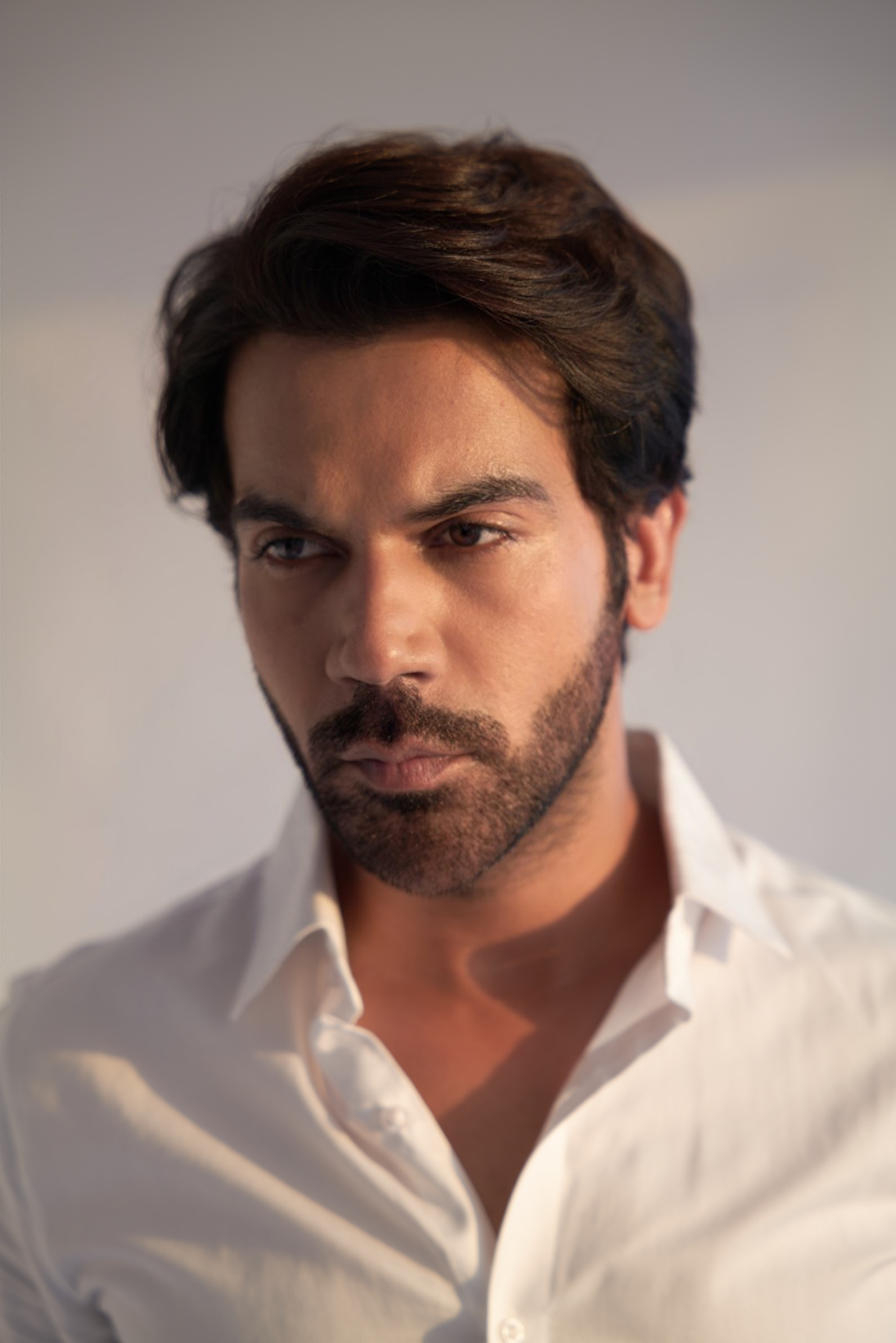
Rajkummar Rao, Best Actor Critics

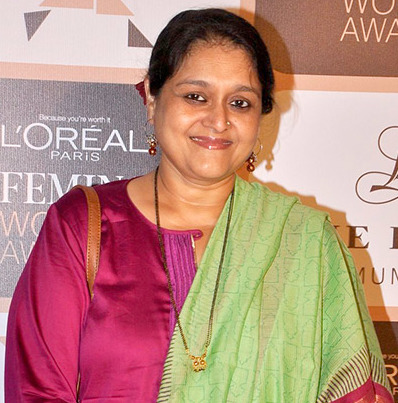
Supriya Pathak, Best Supporting Actress

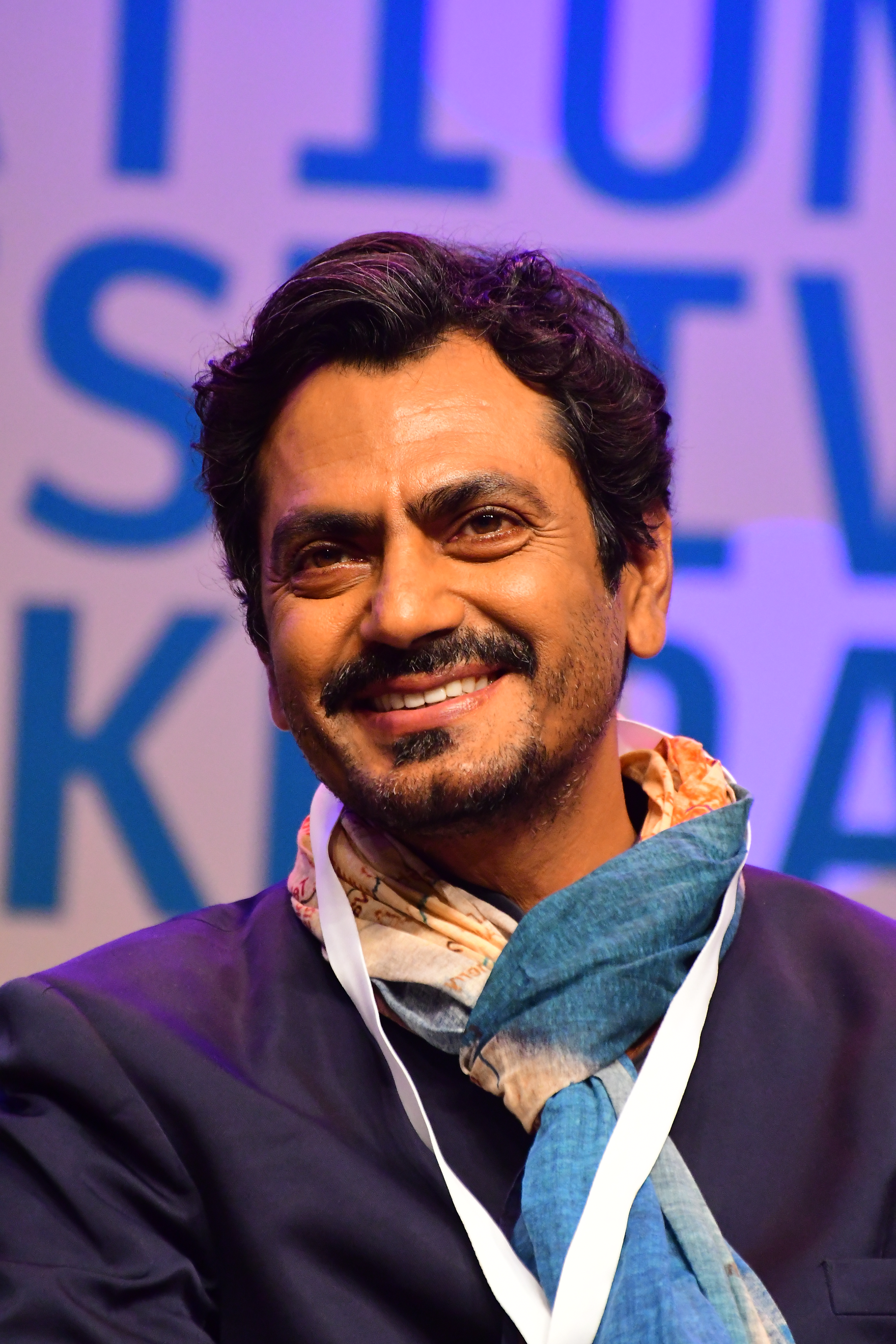
Nawazuddin Siddiqui, Best Supporting Actor

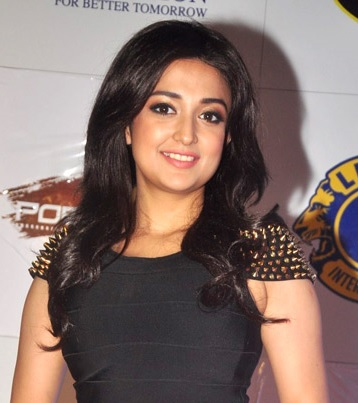
Monali Thakur, Best Female Playback Singer

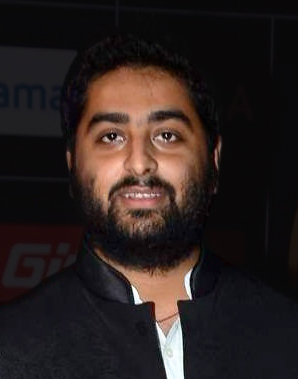
Arijit Singh, Best Male Playback Singer

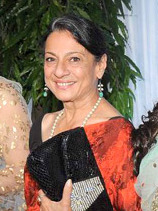
Tanuja, Lifetime Achievement Awardee

Best Film	Best Director
Bhaag Milkha Bhaag – Rakeysh Omprakash Mehra, Rajiv Tandon and P.S. Barathi; Chennai Express – Gauri Khan; Goliyon Ki Raasleela Ram-Leela – Sanjay Leela Bhansali, Kishore Lulla; Raanjhanaa – Krishika Lulla; Yeh Jawaani Hai Deewani – Karan Johar	Rakeysh Omprakash Mehra – Bhaag Milkha Bhaag; Abhishek Kapoor – Kai Po Che!; Anand L. Rai – Raanjhanaa; Ayan Mukerji – Yeh Jawaani Hai Deewani; Rohit Shetty – Chennai Express; Sanjay Leela Bhansali – Goliyon Ki Raasleela Ram-Leela
Best Actor	Best Actress
Farhan Akhtar – Bhaag Milkha Bhaag as Milkha Singh; Dhanush – Raanjhanaa as Kundan Shankar; Hrithik Roshan – Krrish 3 as Rohit Mehra/Krishna Mehra; Ranbir Kapoor – Yeh Jawaani Hai Deewani as Kabir "Bunny" Thapar; Ranveer Singh – Goliyon Ki Raasleela Ram-Leela as Ram Rajari; Shah Rukh Khan – Chennai Express as Rahul Mithaiwala	Deepika Padukone – Goliyon Ki Raasleela Ram-Leela as Leela Sanera; Deepika Padukone – Chennai Express as Meenalochini Azhagu Sundaram; Parineeti Chopra – Shuddh Desi Romance as Gayatri; Shraddha Kapoor – Aashiqui 2 as Aarohi Keshav Shirke; Sonakshi Sinha – Lootera as Pakhi Roy Chaudhary; Sonam Kapoor – Raanjhanaa as Zoya Haider
Best Supporting Actor	Best Supporting Actress
Nawazuddin Siddiqui – The Lunchbox as Shaikh; Aditya Roy Kapur – Yeh Jawaani Hai Deewani as Avinash "Avi" Arora; Anupam Kher – Special 26 as P.K. Sharma; Pankaj Kapur – Matru Ki Bijlee Ka Mandola as Harphool "Harry" Singh Mandola; Rajkummar Rao – Kai Po Che! as Govind Patel; Vivek Oberoi – Krrish 3 as Kaal	Supriya Pathak Kapur – Goliyon Ki Raasleela Ram-Leela as Dhankor "Baa" Sanera; Divya Dutta – Bhaag Milkha Bhaag as Ishri Kaur; Kalki Koechlin – Yeh Jawaani Hai Deewani as Aditi Mehra; Kangana Ranaut – Krrish 3 as Kaya; Konkona Sen Sharma – Ek Thi Daayan as Diana; Swara Bhaskar – Raanjhanaa as Bindiya
Best Male Debut	Best Female Debut
Dhanush – Raanjhanaa as Kundan Shankar	Vaani Kapoor – Shuddh Desi Romance as Tara
Best Music Director	Best Lyricist
Ankit Tiwari, Mithoon and Jeet Ganguly – Aashiqui 2; Amit Trivedi – Lootera; A. R. Rahman – Raanjhanaa; Pritam – Yeh Jawaani Hai Deewani; Sanjay Leela Bhansali – Goliyon Ki Raasleela Ram-Leela; Vishal–Shekhar – Chennai Express	Prasoon Joshi – "Zinda" – Bhaag Milkha Bhaag; Amitabh Bhattacharya – "Shikayatein" – Lootera; Amitabh Bhattacharya – "Kabira" – Yeh Jawaani Hai Deewani; Mithoon – "Tum Hi Ho" – Aashiqui 2; Swanand Kirkire – "Manja" – Kai Po Che!
Best Playback Singer – Male	Best Playback Singer – Female
Arijit Singh – "Tum Hi Ho" – Aashiqui 2; Amit Trivedi – "Manja" – Kai Po Che!; Ankit Tiwari – "Sunn Raha Hai" – Aashiqui 2; Benny Dayal – "Badtameez Dil" – Yeh Jawaani Hai Deewani; Siddharth Mahadevan – "Zinda" – Bhaag Milkha Bhaag	Monali Thakur – "Sawaar Loon" – Lootera; Chinmayi – "Titli" – Chennai Express; Shalmali Kholgade – "Balam Pichkari" – Yeh Jawaani Hai Deewani; Shreya Ghoshal – "Sunn Raha Hai" – Aashiqui 2; Shreya Ghoshal – "Nagada Sang Dhol" – Goliyon Ki Raasleela Ram-Leela

=== Critics' awards ===
Best Film (Best Director)
The Lunchbox (Ritesh Batra)
Best Actor	Best Actress
Rajkummar Rao – Shahid	Shilpa Shukla – B.A. Pass

=== Technical awards ===
Best Story	Best Screenplay
Subhash Kapoor – Jolly LLB; Anand Gandhi, Pankaj Kumar & Kushboo Ranka - Ship of Thesues; Jaideep Sahni - Shuddh Desi Romance; Ritesh Batra - The Lunchbox; Ritesh Shah - B.A. Pass	Chetan Bhagat, Abhishek Kapoor, Supratik Sen & Pubali Chaudhari – Kai Po Che!; Nikkhil Advani, Ritesh Shah, Suresh Nair & Niranjan Iyengar – D-Day; Somnath Dey & Subhendu Bhattacharya – Madras Cafe; Neeraj Pandey – Special 26; Subhash Kapoor – Jolly LLB
Best Dialogue	Best Editing
Subhash Kapoor – Jolly LLB; Farhad-Sajid – Chennai Express; Jaideep Sahni – Shuddh Desi Romance; Neeraj Pandey – Special 26; Sameer Gautam Singh-Shahid	Aarif Sheikh – D-Day; Chandrashekhar Prajapati – Madras Cafe; Deepa Bhatia – Kai Po Che!; John F Lyons – The Lunchbox; Shree Narayan Singh – Special 26
Best Choreography	Best Cinematography
Samir & Arsh Tanna – "Lahu Muh Lag Gaya" from Goliyon Ki Raasleela Ram-Leela	Kamaljeet Negi – Madras Cafe
Best Production Design	Best Sound Design
Acropolis Design – Bhaag Milkha Bhaag	Bishwadeep Chatterjee and Nihar Ranjan Samal – Madras Cafe
Best Costume Design	Best Background Score
Dolly Ahluwalia – Bhaag Milkha Bhaag	Hitesh Sonik – Kai Po Che!
Best Special Effects	Best Action
Tata Elxsi – Dhoom 3	Thomas Struthers & Guru Bachchan – D-Day

=== Special awards ===
Lifetime Achievement Award
- Tanuja
R. D. Burman Award
- Siddharth Mahadevan
Sony Trendsetter of the Year Award
- Chennai Express

== Multiple nominations and awards ==
The following films received multiple nominations.

- 10 nominations: Yeh Jawaani Hai Deewani
- 8 nominations: Aashiqui 2, Bhaag Milkha Bhaag, Goliyon Ki Raasleela Ram-Leela, Raanjhanaa
- 7 nominations: Chennai Express
- 6 nominations: Kai Po Che!
- 4 nominations: Lootera
- 3 nominations: Krrish 3

The following films received multiple awards.

- 6 wins: Bhaag Milkha Bhaag
- 3 wins: Goliyon Ki Raasleela Ram-Leela
- 2 wins: Aashiqui 2, D-Day, Jolly LLB, Kai Po Che!, Madras Cafe, The Lunchbox
