= Bezubaan Ishq =

- बेजुबान इश्क
- Directed by: Jashwant Gangani
- Written by: Story: Jashwant Gangani; Dialogues: Sanjay V. Shah
- Screenplay by: Jashwant Gangani; Sanjay V. Shah
- Produced by: Jashwant Gangani; C.J.Gadara; Dinesh Likhiya
- Starring: Mugdha Godse; Sneha Ullal; Nishant Singh Malkani
- Cinematography: S.Kumar Bhaggat
- Edited by: Paresh Y. Manjrekar
- Music by: Rupesh Verma; Babli Haque
- Production company: Gangani Motion Pictures
- Release date: 3 July 2015
- Running time: 130 minutes
- Country: India
- Language: Hindi

Bezubaan Ishq (transl. Unspoken love) is a 2015 Hindi romantic film directed by Jashwant Gangani and produced by C.J. Gadara and Dinesh Likhiya. The film stars Mugdha Godse, Sneha Ullal, and Nishant Singh Malkani in lead roles. Music directors Babli Haque and Rupesh Verma composed the music for the film. The film was released on July 3, 2015.

== Plot ==
The film is set in a modern milieu with a traditional Indian backdrop and values. It revolves around three friends and their respective families. Mansukh Patel is an NRI business tycoon residing with his British wife, Lisa, and daughter, Rumzum, in London, UK. The Patels live in the United Kingdom but haven't forgotten their Indian tradition and values.

Mansukh's younger brother, Rashmikant, lives in Mumbai with his daughter, Suhani. Having lost his wife Rekha early in life, Rashmikant is a protective father and pampers Suhani with all her demands, as is his mother, Savitri.

Rashmikant's childhood friend, Vipul is also his business partner. He lives with his wife, Laxmi and son, Swagat. Suhani and Swagat have been childhood sweethearts. Suhani is a bindaas, open-hearted girl. Swagat is more subdued in nature. Swagat plays an important role in Suhani's life.

Swagat is bowled over by Rumzum's simplicity, pure innocence, beauty and her nature. Whereas, Suhani is madly in love with Swagat. Suhani and Swagat are engaged. Throughout the film, Rumzum and Swagat sacrifice their love due to Suhani's anger issues and her decreasing health. Their trip to Rajasthan brings Rumzum and Swagat closer: and many incidents happen which leads Suhani to doubt them.

When they come back from the trip, it falls on Rumzums birthday and she receives two gifts from Swagat and Suhani. Swagats gift is a letter saying that he loves her but they cannot be together. Suhani's gift says to open it on the next morning which is the morning of her and Swagats wedding. When she sees the letter it says how Suhani appreciates her and her family. She then says that she has realised that Rumzum and Swagat have feelings for each other.

She steps aside; not physically, instead she gives up her life stating she loves Swagat and cares for his feelings. The film ends with a scene of their families griefing and Swagat and Rumzum married and dripping her ashes in the Ganga.

== Characteristics ==
Mugdha Godse's character, 'Suhani' is an electrifying personality. She is full of life, a spoilt brat, and can be very aggressive when it comes to love and friendship. She loves her friend a lot.

Introducing Nishant malkani as a young boy, playing the role of 'Swagat'. His modern views with traditional values is what will blow your mind. In the film, he is shown as the son of a business tycoon and Suhani's best friend.

Sneha Ullal, plays the role of 'Rumzum', a kind-hearted and innocent girl, who is also 'Suhani's' cousin from London.

== Cast ==
- Mugdha Godse as Suhani
- Sneha Ullal as Rumzum
- Nishant Singh Malkani as Swagat
- Darshan Jariwala as Rashmikant Patel
- Farida Jalal as Savitri
- Sachin Khedekar as Manshuk Patel
- Muni Jha as Vipul Shah
- Smita Jaykar as Laxmi Shah
- Alexandra Ashman as Liza
- Jitu Pandya
- Soniya Mehta as Ananya
- Rittesh Mobh as Pintu
- Akshita Sethi as Jassi
- Aru Krishansh Verma as Parbat
- Devendra Pandit
- Sanjay Patel
- Rakesh Pujara
- Abhijeet
- Ajay Sharma
- Hitesh Rawal
- Naresh Patel
- Yasmine Deliken
- Dr. Rahul Sharma
- Gautam Shrivastav
- Saloni

== Soundtrack ==
Bezubaan Ishq

Soundtrack album by Babli Haque & Rupesh Verma
- Released: 4 June 2015
- Genre: Feature film soundtrack
- Length: 42:09
- Language: Hindi
- Label: Sony Music India

The music for the film is composed by Rupesh Verma & Babli Haque. The soundtrack of the film comprises 7 songs & lyrics are penned by Jashwant Gangani & Prashant Ingole (Har Lamha Kar Party) and the Audio CD was released by Sony Music India.

No.	Title	Lyrics	Music	Singer(s)	Length
1.	"Bezubaan Ishq"	Jashwant Gangani	Rupesh Verma	Javed Ali & Arpita Chakraborty	6:06
2.	"Ankhon Mein Basa Lunga"	Jashwant Gangani	Rupesh Verma	Mohit Chauhan & Parineeta	4:39
3.	"Har Lamha Kar Party"	Prashant Ingole	Babli Haque	Shalmali Kholgade	4:19
4.	"Teri Masumiyat"	Jashwant Gangani	Rupesh Verma	Altamash Faridi	5:08
5.	"Teri Meri Ankahi Dastan"	Jashwant Gangani	Rupesh Verma	Mohit Chauhan & Shreya Ghoshal	6:13
6.	"Dil Parinda"	Jashwant Gangani	Rupesh Verma	Tochi Raina & Anita Bhatt	5:09
7.	"Bhor Bhayo"	Jashwant Gangani	Rupesh Verma	Osman Mir	5:07
8.	"Dil Parinda (Unplugged)"	Jashwant Gangani	Rupesh Verma	Tochi Raina	5:09
Total length:					42:09

== Critical reception ==
Troy Ribeiro of NDTV gave the film a rating of 0.5 out of 5 and said that, "Bezubaan Ishq lacks novelty and offers nothing spectacular. The plot, stitched with numerous songs, seems forced and the situations contrived." Paloma Sharma of Rediff gave the film a rating of 0.5 out of 5 and said that, "Bezubaan Ishq is pure drivel." Renuka Vyavahare of The Times of India criticized the film makers for making a film on a story that is way past its expiry date and said that, "Their concept is ghastly outdated and the television soap opera-esque execution yawn-worthy." The critic gave the film a rating of 1.5 out of 5.
