= Kabira (song) =

Song performed by Pritam

Song by Pritam feat. Rekha Bhardwaj and Tochi Raina

from the album Yeh Jawaani Hai Deewani
- Released: 29 April 2013
- Genre: Filmi; Indian pop; Sufi
- Length: 3:44
- Label: T-Series
- Composer: Pritam
- Lyricist: Amitabh Bhattacharya

Yeh Jawaani Hai Deewani track listing
- 1. "Badtameez Dil"; 2. "Balam Pichkari"; 3. "Ilahi"; 4. "Kabira"; 5. "Dilliwaali Girlfriend"; 6. "Subhanallah"; 7. "Ghagra"; 8. "Kabira (Encore)"; 9. "Ilahi (Reprise)"

Music video
- "Kabira" on YouTube

Kabira is an Indian song from the 2013 Hindi film, Yeh Jawaani Hai Deewani. Composed by Pritam Chakraborty, the song is sung by Rekha Bhardwaj and Tochi Raina, with lyrics by Amitabh Bhattacharya. The track focuses on actors Ranbir Kapoor, Deepika Padukone and Kalki Koechlin. An encore version of the same song was released as part of the film soundtrack, which was rendered by Arijit Singh and Harshdeep Kaur.

== Background ==
The song is composed by Pritam. The song is a soothing melody with a Sufi touch to it, in a mix of rustic and western tunes. The song is shot at several locations from Rajasthan, and cinematography for the video is done by V. Manikandan. It is produced by Arijit Singh who also rendered the encore version of the same song. Singh produced another track from the film, titled "Balam Pichkari" which is sung by Vishal Dadlani and Shalmali Kholgade. Regarding his association in the song as a music producer, Singh stated; "It was a lean phase. That time helped me in becoming a better musician". In an interview with NDTV, Deepika Padukone picked the song as one of her favourite songs from the film and said it is the only song she "constantly heard on loop".

The music video of the encore version of the song is primarily focused on the wedding preparations of Kalki Koechlin, while the music video of the original version mainly focuses on the relationship of Padukone and Ranbir Kapoor, along with the wedding ceremony of Koechlin with Kunaal Roy Kapur and Kapoor's dream to wander and discover the world. The released promotional music video features Kapoor through snippets from the song "Ilahi". The encore version of the song has a more Punjabi touch to it and has been accompanied with many Hindustani musical instruments like dhol, tabla, sitar, shehnai being used to create the desired effect. In the version, the female lyrics are completely changed and relates to a girl's marriage where her family describes their state of mind as she is leaving the home and moving to her sasural or her in law's house .

== Release and response ==
The song was released digitally as a part of the soundtrack of film on 29 April 2013. The music video of the song was officially released on 4 May 2013, through the YouTube channel of T-Series. It was the last original song released from the film.

The song was ranked at position 3, in the list of "Best Songs of 2013" published by Bollywood Spice on 25 December 2013. In an interview with Hindustan Times actor Arshad Warsi chose the song as "one song that describes his current state of mind". Harshdeep Kaur picked the song as one of the Sufi songs she loves the most, while lyricist Swanand Kirkire picked the lyrics by Amitabh Bhattacharya in the song as one of his most favourites.

== Critical reception ==
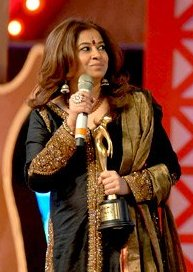
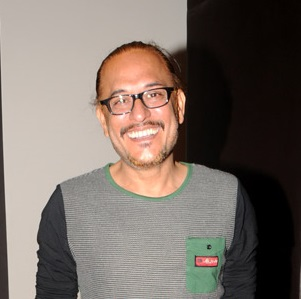
The duet collaboration between Bhardwaj (left) and Raina (right) was acclaimed by critics.

Bollywood Hungama's Rajiv Vijayakar wrote: "Tochi Raina gives it his all and the end guitar in relentless mode is simply fabulous. Rekha Bhardwaj is in customary comfort zone in a mix of raags and rock". Writing for Koimoi, Mohar Basu praising the song as "mesmerizingly beautiful", felt "Bhardwaj's voice glistens brilliantly with Tochi Raina's".

Reviewers from IBNLive praising the vocals by Raina and its "liberating music" stated: "It's a kind of song that grows on you. Not a very long number, it keeps the essence of the song intact". Sankhayan Ghosh of The Indian Express reacted very positively to the song; "The singers' robust, folksy voices, backed by a comforting guitar arpeggio, make this one of the better songs of the album".

=== Encore version ===
Writing for Koimoi, Mohar Basu thought the version "works as well as its original" and stated: "Kabira’s subtle essence and Harshdeep’s indomitable voice overpowers the melody of the track". Similar sentiments were echoed by Sankhayan Ghosh of The Indian Express. Reviewers from IBNLive felt the version is better than the original and further elaborated: "Set in the backdrop of a wedding, it is blissfully rhythmic and beautiful.". However, Bollywood Hungama's Rajiv Vijayakar found Singh's rendition in the song "mechanical" and concluded that the version "does not impress as much".

== Live performance ==
Arijit Singh performed the song live in a duet with Harshdeep Kaur on 28 September 2013, at "Dubai Music Week's Bollywood Night" concert. It was also one of the songs Singh performed during his concert at "Xpressions" which was organised by Xavier Institute of Management in Bhubaneswar and held on 10 November 2013. Singh also performed the song in a live concert held at Radisson Blu Water Garden Hotel at Dhaka on 4 April 2014.

Singh performed the song as his final performance in his series of "Arijit Singh Live in Concert – Tum Hi Ho" at the City Amphitheatre, Qurum on 19 October 2014. Apart from the Omen concert, he also used the song as his ending act during the concert he held in the parking lot of Inorbit Mall in Malad, on 19 December 2014 and the concert at Emaar Boulder Hills in the city on 27 December 2014. Apart from the vocalists of the song, it was performed by Deepika Padukone in her act from 20th Annual Life OK Screen Awards, along with "Titli", "Nagada Sang Dhol" and "Ang Lagade".

== Track formats ==
- Original Motion Picture Soundtrack
1. "Kabira" – 3:44
2. "Kabira (Encore)" – 4:29

== Awards and nominations ==
Award (2014)	Category	Nominee	Result	Ref
59th Filmfare Awards	Best Lyricist	Amitabh Bhattacharya	Nominated	
8th Star Guild Apsara Awards	Best Female Playback Singer	Rekha Bhardwaj	Nominated	
4th Gionee Star Global Indian Music Academy Awards	Best Duet	Rekha Bhardwaj and Tochi Raina	Won	
4th Gionee Star Global Indian Music Academy Awards	Best lyricist	Amitabh Bhattacharya	Nominated	
4th Gionee Star Global Indian Music Academy Awards	Best Playback Singer (Male)	Tochi Raina	Nominated	
Zee Cine Awards 2014	Best lyricist	Amitabh Bhattacharya	Nominated	
