= Tochi Raina =

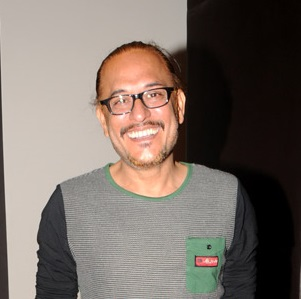
- Raina in January 2015

Background information
- Born: Tarlochan Raina; 2 September 1971 (age 54); Darbhanga, Bihar, India
- Genres: Sufi, Filmi, Hindustani classical music, Sufi
- Occupations: Singer, composer
- Instrument: Vocals
- Member of: Band of Bandagi

Tochi Raina (born 2 September 1971) is an Indian singer, composer and philosopher, best known as a playback singer in Hindi films. His most notable works include the songs "Kabira" from the film Yeh Jawaani Hai Deewani, "Iktara" from Wake Up Sid, "Ishq Waale Chor Hain" for the film Kya Yahi Sach Hai with Vishal Khurana, "Saibo", a duet with Shreya Ghoshal, for the film Shor in the City, "Maldar Ki Jeb" for the film Bhindi Bazaar and "Aali Re" for the film No One Killed Jessica. He recorded an EP, Tochinaamah, consisting of 3 songs, "Saaiyaan", "Jamoora" and "Akela".

== Early life ==
He was born in a Kashmiri Sikh family to Sahib and Surjit Kumar Raina in Darbhanga, Bihar and went to school in Nepal where his father, a government employee, was posted.

He hails from a family with music background. His father played the harmonium, his grandmother was a Sitar player, his uncle, Ratan Singh, a renowned Violin player and his grandfather, Akaali Kaur Singh, a saint. He later moved to Delhi where he started learning music under Pandit Vinod Kumar, a disciple of Indian classical singer Ustad Bade Ghulam Ali Khan. He also learnt music from Ustad Bhure Khan, Ustad Nusrat Fateh Ali Khan, Ustad Altaf Hussain Sarang, Pt. Mani Prasad and Pt. Sitaram. According to him, his Gurus not only taught him music, but also to visualize his breath. Slowly, he started visualizing words and he turned to spirituality and Sufi music.

== Career ==
He moved to Mumbai to make a career as a music composer & playback singer. Tochi got his first commercial break with "Bulle Shah" in A Wednesday! in 2008. He has contributed to various film soundtracks and albums as a music composer including Bezubaan Ishq, Note Pe Chot and a lot more. He is currently working with his Band of Bandagi and creating soulful Sufi music with the band. Band of Bandagi released their first album Sufi Acoustica with 6 Sufi Songs in it. Tochi also joined hands with Music Distribution Company Movement Creations LLP as the Head of the Department for music since March 2021. In 2021, four of his singles has been released so far including "Gayatri Mantra" (Raag Malkauns), "Alakh Niranjan", "Hare Krishna", "Aaj Jaane Ki Zid Na Karo".

He also sang the song "Rabba" in the third season of Coke Studio, composed by Amit Trivedi, and the song "Bannado" in the fourth season of Coke Studio which was composed and arranged by Sachin-Jigar and the lyrics were written by Priya Sariya.

== Personal life ==
He is married and has two daughters, Harleen & Simran. Harleen was born the night he finished recording for Shor in the City.

== List of songs ==
Released	Song	Album
2008	Bulle Shah	A Wednesday!
2009	Pardesi	Dev D
2010	Iktara (Male Version)	Wake up Sid
2010	Gal Mitthi Mitthi	Aisha
2011	Aali Re	No One Killed Jessica
2011	Mera Kaat Kaleja Dilli	No One Killed Jessica
2011	Saibo	Shor in the City
2011	Maaldaar Ki Jeb	Bhindi Bazaar
2011	Ishq Waale Chor Hain	Kya Yahi Sach Hai
2011	Mallo Malli	Mausam
2011	Shiv Ka Bajey Damroo	Jo Dooba So Paar
2011	Kaari Kaari	Kaagaz Ke Fools
2012	Aaja Meri Jaan	Maximum
2012	Hey Bhagwan	Cigarette ki Tarah
2012	Motarwada	Luv Shuv Tey Chicken Khurana
2013	Khalbali	3G
2013	Gud Naal Ishaq Mitha	I Love New Year
2013	Kabira	Yeh Jawaani Hai Deewani
2014	Saaiyaan	Tochinaamah
2014	Jamoora	Tochinaamah
2014	Akela	Tochinaamah
2015	Dil Parinda	Bezubaan Ishq
2016	Kalol Ho Gaya	Love Shagun
2016	Dooriyan	Non-album single
2017	Parinda (Search)	Jab Harry Met Sejal
2018	Rab-E-Illahi	Non-album single
2018	Aas Pura Diya Maula	Premak Basaat
2018	Sone Piya	Sufi Acoustica
2018	Piya Milan Ki Aas	Sufi Acoustica
2018	Jugni	Sufi Acoustica
2019	Udd Ja	Khandaani Shafakhana
2019	Twinkle Twinkle	Ujda Chaman
2020	Do Din Ka Ye Mela - Reprise	Gulabo Sitabo
2021	Gayatri Mantra (Raag Malkauns)	Non-album single
2021	Alakh Niranjan	Non-album single
2021	Hare Krishna	Non-album single
2021	Aaj Jaane Ki Zid Na Karo	Non-album single
