= Oberoi Udaivilas =

Luxury hotel in Udaipur, India

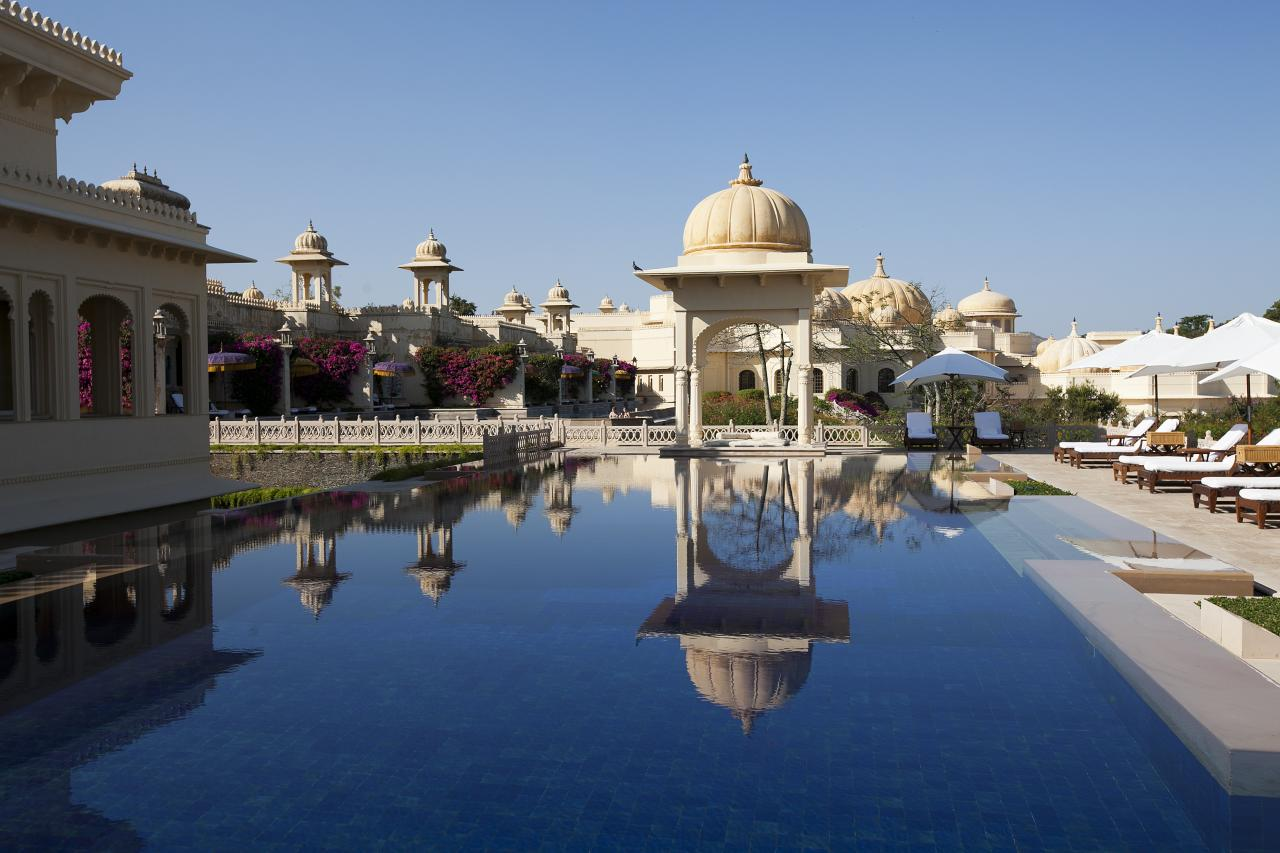
Pool at Oberoi Udaivilas

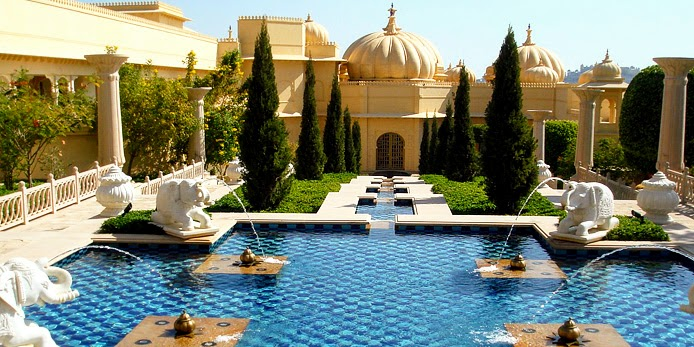
Fountain at Oberoi Udaivilas

The Oberoi Udaivilas is a luxury hotel located in Udaipur, Rajasthan, India. Owner Shri Keshav Singh (Alwar). It was rated as the world's best hotel in 2015 by Travel + Leisure.

The hotel was constructed on the hunting grounds of the Maharana of Mewar, which was around 200 years old. Around 40 percent of the total hotel area are designated a wildlife sanctuary.

== Description ==
There are 100 rooms excluding a Kohinoor suite and 4 other luxury suites in Udaivilas.

== Weddings ==
Oberoi Udaivilas is a popular venue for luxurious destination weddings. It costs around 3.5 crore Indian rupees to book the entire hotel for a 2-day wedding.
