= Dilliwaali Girlfriend =

2013 Hindi song

- Cover of the song, featuring actors Ranbir Kapoor and Deepika Padukone

Song by Arijit Singh and Sunidhi Chauhan

from the album Yeh Jawaani Hai Deewani
- Released: 26 April 2013 (Music Video); 29 April 2013 (Full song)
- Genre: Filmi; Electronic; Pop; Bhangra
- Length: 4:22
- Label: T-Series
- Composer: Pritam
- Lyricist: Kumaar

Yeh Jawaani Hai Deewani track listing
- 1. "Badtameez Dil"; 2. "Balam Pichkari"; 3. "Ilahi"; 4. "Kabira"; 5. "Dilliwaali Girlfriend"; 6. "Subhanallah"; 7. "Ghagra"; 8. "Kabira (Encore)"; 9. "Illahi (Reprise)"

Music video
- "Dilliwaali Girlfriend" on YouTube

Dilliwaali Girlfriend (transl. Delhiite girlfriend) is a Hindi song from the 2013 Hindi film Yeh Jawaani Hai Deewani. Composed by Pritam Chakraborty, the song is sung by Arijit Singh and Sunidhi Chauhan, with lyrics penned by Kumaar. The music video of the track features actors Ranbir Kapoor and Deepika Padukone.

== Background ==
The song is composed by Pritam, having a mix of Punjabi beats and contemporary music with a Delhi flavour to it. The lyrics are penned by Kumaar. When he met Pritam, he expressed a wish to "write something" where Pritam asked Kumaar to write for the melody of this song. On instant hearing, director of the film Ayan Mukerji wanted the song, since it was perfect for the situation in his mind.

The music video features Ranbir Kapoor and Deepika Padukone. In the song, Padukone wears a red choli and a matching red lehenga with side slit, while Kapoor wears a grey kurta pyjama, bearing a similarity to Salman Khan in the music video titled "Dupatta Tera Nau Rangda" from the film Partner (2007). Kalki Koechlin and Aditya Roy Kapoor join in at the end of the video with some desi moves. The song is choreographed by Ganesh Acharya. The song is mixed by Eric Pillai and assisted by Michael Edwin Pillai.

== Release ==
The music video of the song was officially released on 26 April 2013, through the YouTube channel of T-Series. The full song was later released along with other tracks of the album on 29 April 2013. The music video is the third song released from the film after "Badtameez Dil" and "Balam Pichkari". The song was released with the tagline "Bunny has broken the signals, started saving up, bid good bye to his family & even left his Dilliwaali Girlfriend... All for Naina".

== Critical reception ==
Bollywood Hungama's Rajiv Vijayakar found the blend of English, Hindi and unadulterated irreverence, a clever work by Kumaar and further stated "Here's where a different Arijit Singh, along with the seasoned Sunidhi Chauhan, keeps the track on a high keel".

Mohar Basu from Koimoi criticised the lyrics by Kumaar and felt that Singh was "unceremoniously wasted" in this song and Chauhan's "unsurpassable energy" too fails in this one.

The song was included in "The Best Dance Moves of 2013", published by Koimoi. It was positioned at four in the list of "Best dance numbers of 2013", published by The Times of India on 29 July 2014.

== Live performance ==
Arijit Singh performed the song live in his London debut concert at the Indigo Arena on 29 August 2014, as part of his "Tum Hi Ho UK Tour". Sunidhi Chauhan performed the song in her concert at Emirates Palace in August 2014. She also performed the song during her UK tour concert at Royal Albert Hall on 1 October 2013.

Apart from the live performances by the artists at concerts, the song was used in many dancing platforms. Valerie Rockey and Ricky Ubeda performed the song on the eleventh season of So You Think You Can Dance, choreographed by Nakul Dev Mahajan on 23 July 2014.

== Nominations ==
Year	Award	Nominee	Category	Ref
2013	BIG Star Entertainment Awards	Ranbir Kapoor	BIG Star Most Entertaining Dancer	
2013	BIG Star Entertainment Awards	Sunidhi Chauhan	Most Entertaining Singer (Female)	
2013	BIG Star Entertainment Awards	Pritam	Most Entertaining Song	
