= Balam Pichkari =

2013 Hindi song

- Cover of the song, featuring actors Ranbir Kapoor and Deepika Padukone

Song by Vishal Dadlani and Shalmali Kholgade

from the album Yeh Jawaani Hai Deewani
- Released: 29 April 2013
- Genre: Filmi; Electronic; Pop
- Length: 4:50
- Label: T-Series
- Composer: Pritam
- Lyricist: Amitabh Bhattacharya

Yeh Jawaani Hai Deewani track listing
- 1. "Badtameez Dil"; 2. "Dilliwaali Girlfriend"; 3. "Ilahi"; 4. "Kabira"; 5. "Balam Pichkari"; 6. "Subhanallah"; 7. "Ghagra"; 8. "Kabira (Encore)"; 9. "Illahi (Reprise)"

Music video
- "Balam Pichkari" on YouTube

Balam Pichkari (Note: This is a shortened version of the lines “बलम पिचकारी जो तूने मुझे मारी, तो सीधी सादी छोरी शराबी हो गयी.” It roughly translates as “O my beloved! As you sprayed me with colors [on the festival of Holi], a simple girl like me got intoxicated with your love.”) is a Hindi song from the 2013 film, Yeh Jawaani Hai Deewani, with music composed by Pritam Chakraborty, lyrics by Amitabh Bhattacharya, and sung by Shalmali Kholgade and Vishal Dadlani. The music video of the track mainly focuses on actors Ranbir Kapoor, Deepika Padukone and Kalki Koechlin, and Aditya Roy Kapur. This song is often played during Holi such as on TV shows.

== Background ==
This song was shot in 4 hours but the choreography of the dance was recorded in three minutes and thirty seconds. It was choreographed by Remo Dsouza

== Release and response ==
The music video of the song was officially released on 22 June 2013 as a part of the soundtrack of film, through the YouTube channel of T-Series. It has become a popular choice to play on the festival of Holi. This song is also represented as a symbol of intimacy.
