= Amitabh Bhattacharya =

Indian lyricist and singer (born 1976)

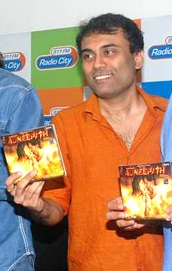
- Bhattacharya at the audio release for Agneepath
- Born: 16 November 1976 (age 49); Lucknow, Uttar Pradesh, India
- Education: Spring Dale College, Lucknow
- Occupations: Lyricist; playback singer; film producer

Amitabh Bhattacharya (Bengali pronunciation: [ɔmitabʱo bʱɔtːat͡ʃard͡ʒo]; born 16 November 1976) is an Indian lyricist and playback singer who works in Indian films. He began his career in the 2000s as a playback singer, and gained recognition when he wrote lyrics for Amit Trivedi for Dev.D. He has notably worked with music director Pritam, writing the lyrics for his compositions for Barfi! (2012), Cocktail (2012), Agent Vinod (2012), Yeh Jawaani Hai Deewani(2013), Dhoom 3 (2013), Dilwale (2015), Bajrangi Bhaijaan (2015), Dangal (2016), Ae Dil Hai Mushkil (2016), Raabta (2017), Kalank (2019), Chhichhore (2019), Love Aaj Kal (2020), Laal Singh Chaddha (2022), Brahmāstra (2022), Tu Jhoothi Main Makkaar (2023), Rocky Aur Rani Kii Prem Kahaani (2023), Dunki (2023), The Great Indian Family (2023), Tiger 3 (2023), and Chandu Champion (2024).

He has won the National Film Award for the song "Agar Zindagi" from the film I Am. In his song-writing career he has won the highest number of awards, precisely 9, for the song "Channa Mereya" to date. His lyrics have been variously described as "frillfree" and "smartly worded".

== Notable work ==
In his career, he has worked with some talented music composers like Pritam, A. R. Rahman, Amit Trivedi, Ajay-Atul, Sajid–Wajid, Vishal–Shekhar, Salim–Sulaiman, Ram Sampath, Shankar–Ehsaan–Loy, Sachin-Jigar and many more.

Some of his best known songs are "Iktara", "Channa Mereya", "Ae Dil Hai Mushkil", "Bulleya", "Kabira", "Balam Pichkari", "Badtameez Dil", "Mast Magan", "Raabta", "Zehnaseeb", "Abhi Mujh Mein Kahin", "Naina", "Khairiyat", "Manja", "Janam Janam", "Zinda Hoon", "Gerua", "Zaalima", "Sapna Jahan", "Sweetheart", "Namo Namo", "Ghar More Pardesiya", "First Class", "Kalank Title Track", "Param Sundari", "Kesariya", "Tere Pyaar Mein", "O Bedardeya", "Apna Bana Le" etc.

== Early life ==
Bhattacharya was born into a Bengali family. Bhattacharya did schooling in Lucknow at Spring Dale College, Indira Nagar in 1995 followed by graduation from Lucknow University in 1999.

Bhattacharya moved to Mumbai for becoming a singer in 1999. In an interview with The Times of India in 2013, Bhattacharya said that he migrated to Mumbai from Lucknow harbouring dreams of becoming a singer. He stood in the long queues in front of the music composers' offices and gave them demo "Audio Cassettes" to listen to him. But it didn't bear any fruit. During his struggling days, he started writing lyrics for Advertisement jingles to lower his frustration of not getting work. He learned the art of songwriting during those struggling days.

In the year 2004, when his friend Amartya Rahut introduced him to music composer Amit Trivedi, Trivedi and Rahut, who often composed music for television channels, took Bhattacharya as a dummy singer to give presentations of his music. Trivedi also urged him to write rough lyrics. While writing lyrics, Bhattacharya discovered that he had an innate talent for giving words to tunes. Over the years, Trivedi and Bhattacharya became good friends.

His major breakthrough came when Trivedi was working on the music of Anurag Kashyap's Dev.D, Trivedi insisted Bhattacharya write rough lyrics. Bhattacharya wrote the lyrics for the songs of Dev.D, and most of its major songs became a hit, thus nearly ending 8 years of his struggle for recognition.

== Filmography ==
=== As lyricist ===
| Year | Film | Composer | Notes |
|---|---|---|---|
| 2008 | Aamir | Amit Trivedi | |
| 2009 | Acid Factory | Manasi Scott | One song Along with Manasi Scott |
| 2009 | 99 | Ashutosh Pathak; Shamir Tandon | |
| 2009 | Dev D | Amit Trivedi | Eight songs |
| 2010 | Chance Pe Dance | Adnan Sami | One Song |
| 2010 | Housefull | Shankar–Ehsaan–Loy | Two Songs |
| 2010 | Udaan | Amit Trivedi | Four songs |
| 2010 | Once Upon A Time in Mumbaai | Pritam | One Song |
| 2010 | Anjaana Anjaani | Vishal–Shekhar | One Song (Along with Anvita Dutt and Caralisa Monteiro) |
| 2010 | Band Baaja Baaraat | Salim–Sulaiman | |
| 2011 | No One Killed Jessica | Amit Trivedi | |
| 2011 | Thank You | Pritam | Three Songs |
| 2011 | I Am | Amit Trivedi | National Award: Best Lyrics |
| 2011 | Luv Ka The End | Ram Sampath | |
| 2011 | Ready | Pritam | One Song |
| 2011 | Desi Boyz | Pritam | One Song |
| 2011 | Delhi Belly | Ram Sampath | Three Songs |
| 2011 | Chillar Party | Amit Trivedi | One Song |
| 2011 | Always Kabhi Kabhi | Pritam | Two Songs (One with SRK) |
| 2011 | My Friend Pinto | Ajay–Atul | Five songs |
| 2011 | Aazaan | Salim–Sulaiman | Three Songs |
| 2011 | Ladies V/S Ricky Bahl | Salim–Sulaiman | |
| 2011 | Pappu Can't Dance Saala | Malhar | |
| 2012 | Agneepath | Ajay–Atul | won IIFA Award for Best Lyrics |
| 2012 | Ek Main aur Ekk Tu | Amit Trivedi | |
| 2012 | Agent Vinod | Pritam | Six songs |
| 2012 | Housefull 2 | Sajid–Wajid | One song |
| 2012 | Ferrari Ki Sawaari | Pritam | One song |
| 2012 | Cocktail | Pritam | One song |
| 2012 | Shirin Farhad Ki Toh Nikal Padi | Jeet Ganguly | Five songs |
| 2012 | Barfi! | Pritam | One song |
| 2012 | Heroine | Salim–Sulaiman | |
| 2012 | Aiyyaa | Amit Trivedi | |
| 2013 | Bombay Talkies | Amit Trivedi | Three Songs |
| 2013 | Go Goa Gone | Sachin–Jigar | Two songs |
| 2013 | Yeh Jawaani Hai Deewani | Pritam | Eight songs |
| 2013 | Ghanchakkar | Amit Trivedi | |
| 2013 | Lootera | Amit Trivedi | |
| 2013 | Chennai Express | Vishal–Shekhar | Seven songs |
| 2013 | Rabba Main Kya Karoon | Salim–Sulaiman | Three Songs |
| 2013 | Phata Poster Nikla Hero | Pritam | Two Songs |
| 2013 | Dhoom 3 | Pritam | One Song |
| 2014 | Mr Joe B. Carvalho | Amartya Bobo Rahut | One Song |
| 2014 | Yaariyan | Pritam | One Song |
| 2014 | Hasee Toh Phasee | Vishal–Shekhar | Five songs |
| 2014 | Shaadi Ke Side Effects | Pritam | Two songs |
| 2014 | Darr @ the Mall | Shankar–Ehsaan–Loy | |
| 2014 | One By Two | Shankar–Ehsaan–Loy | |
| 2014 | 2 States | Shankar–Ehsaan–Loy | |
| 2014 | Lekar Hum Deewana Dil | A. R. Rahman | |
| 2014 | Ungli | Sachin-Jigar; Salim-Sulaiman | Two songs |
| 2014 | Happy Ending | Sachin-Jigar | |
| 2015 | Bombay Velvet | Amit Trivedi | |
| 2015 | Bajrangi Bhaijaan | Pritam | One song |
| 2015 | Brothers | Ajay–Atul | |
| 2015 | Phantom | Pritam | Five songs |
| 2015 | Shaandaar | Amit Trivedi | Four songs |
| 2015 | Dilwale | Pritam | |
| 2016 | Ghayal Once Again | Shankar–Ehsaan–Loy | |
| 2016 | Ki and Ka | Ilaiyaraaja | One song |
| 2016 | Te3n | Clinton Cerejo | |
| 2016 | Banjo | Vishal–Shekhar | |
| 2016 | Ae Dil Hai Mushkil | Pritam | Won 12 Awards including 62nd Filmfare Awards & Zee Cine Awards |
| 2016 | Kahaani 2: Durga Rani Singh | Clinton Cerejo | Three songs |
| 2016 | Dangal | Pritam | |
| 2017 | Raees | JAM8 | One song (won Zee Cine Awards) |
| 2017 | Poorna | Salim–Sulaiman | |
| 2017 | Raabta | Pritam, JAM8 | Five songs (Two with Irshad Kamil) |
| 2017 | Tubelight | Pritam | Six songs |
| 2017 | Jagga Jasoos | Pritam | Five songs (won 63rd Filmfare Awards) |
| 2018 | Blackmail | Amit Trivedi | Four songs (One with Divine & Daval Parab) |
| 2018 | Dhadak | Ajay–Atul | |
| 2018 | Thugs of Hindostan | Ajay–Atul | |
| 2018 | Kedarnath | Amit Trivedi | |
| 2019 | Milan Talkies | Rana Mazumder | Four songs |
| 2019 | Kalank | Pritam | |
| 2019 | India's Most Wanted | Amit Trivedi | |
| 2019 | Super 30 | Ajay–Atul | |
| 2019 | Mission Mangal | Amit Trivedi | Two Songs |
| 2019 | Chhichhore | Pritam | |
| 2019 | The Zoya Factor | Shankar–Ehsaan–Loy | |
| 2020 | Dil Bechara | A. R. Rahman | Disney Plus Hotstar film |
| 2021 | Koi Jaane Na | Tanishk Bagchi | One Song |
| 2021 | Roohi | Sachin–Jigar | Four Songs |
| 2021 | Mimi | A. R. Rahman | Netflix film |
| 2021 | Bunty Aur Babli 2 | Shankar–Ehsaan–Loy | |
| 2022 | Jhund | Ajay–Atul | Three Songs |
| 2022 | Dasvi | Sachin-Jigar | One song Netflix film |
| 2022 | Dhaakad | Shankar-Ehsaan-Loy | Two Songs |
| 2022 | Bhool Bhulaiyaa 2 | Pritam | Two Songs (One with Yo Yo Honey Singh) |
| 2022 | Laal Singh Chaddha | Pritam | |
| 2022 | Brahmastra | Pritam | Won 68th Filmfare Awards |
| 2022 | Drishyam 2 | Devi Sri Prasad | |
| 2022 | Bhediya | Sachin-Jigar | |
| 2022 | Qala | Amit Trivedi | One song Netflix film |
| 2023 | Shehzada | Pritam; Abhijit Vaghani | One song Along with Ashish Pandit |
| 2023 | Zara Hatke Zara Bachke | Sachin-Jigar | Won 69th Filmfare Awards |
| 2023 | Tu Jhoothi Main Makkaar | Pritam | All songs |
| 2023 | Rocky Aur Rani Kii Prem Kahaani | Pritam | All songs (One with Raja Mehdi Ali Khan) |
| 2023 | The Great Indian Family | Pritam | All songs |
| 2023 | Tiger 3 | Pritam | One song |
| 2023 | Dunki | Pritam | Two songs |
| 2024 | Munjya | Sachin-Jigar | |
| 2024 | Stree 2 | Sachin-Jigar | |
| 2024 | Chandu Champion | Pritam | Two songs |
| 2025 | Azaad | Amit Trivedi | All songs (one with Swanand Kirkire) |
| 2025 | Nadaaniyan | Sachin-Jigar | Netflix film |
| 2025 | Raid 2 | Amit Trivedi | Re-used the track from previous installment |
| 2025 | Sitaare Zameen Par | Shankar-Ehsaan-Loy | |
| 2025 | Metro... In Dino | Pritam | Five songs |
| 2025 | Housefull 5 | Shankar–Ehsaan–Loy, Sajid–Wajid, Julius Packiam | One song - "Housefull 5 Mixtape" along with Sameer |
| 2025 | Maalik | Sachin-Jigar | All songs (one with MC Square) |
| 2025 | War 2 | Pritam | Three songs |
| 2025 | Param Sundari | Sachin-Jigar | |
| 2025 | Thama | Sachin-Jigar | |
| 2026 | Ikkis | Sachin-Jigar; White Noise Collectives | |

=== As playback singer ===
| Year | Film | Composer | Song |
|---|---|---|---|
| 2008 | Aamir | Amit Trivedi | "Ek Lau" |
| 2008 | Aamir | Amit Trivedi | "Ha Raham" |
| 2009 | Wake Up Sid | Amit Trivedi | "Iktara" |
| 2009 | Dev D | Amit Trivedi | "Emotional Atyachar" |
| 2010 | Band Baaja Baaraat | Salim–Sulaiman | "Mitra" |
| 2010 | Udaan | Amit Trivedi | "Geet" |
| 2010 | Udaan | Amit Trivedi | "Aazadiyan" |
| 2010 | Admissions Open | Amit Trivedi | "Dariya Ubale" |
| 2010 | Admissions Open | Amit Trivedi | "Aasman Ke Paar" |
| 2010 | Housefull | Shankar–Ehsaan–Loy | "Loser" |
| 2010 | Fast Forward | | "Aankhon ki Baat" |
| 2011 | No One Killed Jessica | Amit Trivedi | "Dua" |
| 2012 | Agent Vinod | Pritam | "Pyaar ki Pungi" |
| 2012 | Aiyyaa | Amit Trivedi | "What to do" |
| 2013 | Lootera | Amit Trivedi | "Ankahee" |
| 2013 | Lootera | Amit Trivedi | "Manmarziyan" |
| 2013 | Lootera | Amit Trivedi | "Shikayatein" |
| 2013 | Lootera | Amit Trivedi | "Monta Re" |
| 2013 | Chennai Express | Vishal–Shekhar | "Tera Rasta Chhodun Na" |
| 2014 | 2 States | Shankar–Ehsaan–Loy | "Offo" |
| 2014 | Happy Ending | Sachin–Jigar | "Paaji Tussi Such a Pussy Cat" |
| 2015 | Bhale Manchi Roju | Sunny M.R. | "Vaareva Ore Maccha" (Telugu) |
| 2019 | Chhichhore | Pritam | "Fikar Not" |
| 2020 | Jai Mummy Di | Amartya Bobo Rahut | "Manney Ignore Kar Rahi" |
| 2022 | Bhediya | Sachin-Jigar | "Baaki Sab Theek" |
| 2024 | Munjya | Sachin-Jigar | "Hai Jamalo" |
| 2025 | Sitaare Zameen Par | Shankar–Ehsaan–Loy | "Good for Nothing" |
| 2025 | Sitaare Zameen Par | Shankar–Ehsaan–Loy | "Shubh Mangalam" |

=== Film producer ===
- The Film (2005)

== Awards ==
| Award | Category | Award Details |
|---|---|---|
| | | Song: "Abhi Mujh Mein Kahin" |
| GiMA Awards | Lyricist of the Year | Song: "Abhi Mujh Mein Kahin" |
| 14th IIFA Awards | Best Lyricist | Song: "Abhi Mujh Mein Kahin" |
| Mirchi Music Awards | Album of The Year | Song: "Abhi Mujh Mein Kahin" |
| Mirchi Music Awards | Critics' Choice Song of the Decade | |
| 59th National Film Awards | Best Lyrics | Song: "Agar Zindagi" |
| 7th Mirchi Music Awards | Album of The Year | Film: 2 States |
| RMIM Puruskaar 2016 | Lyricist of the Year | Films: Ae Dil Hai Mushkil; Dangal; Te3n; Banjo |
| 2016 Screen Awards | Best Lyricist | Song: "Ae Dil Hai Mushkil" |
| 2017 SpotBoyE Awards | Best Lyricist | Song: "Bulleya" |
| 9th Mirchi Music Awards | Critics' Choice Lyricist of the Year | Song: "Channa Mereya" |
| 9th Mirchi Music Awards | Critics' Choice Song of the Year | Song: "Channa Mereya" |
| 9th Mirchi Music Awards | Critics' Choice Lyricist of the Decade | Song: "Channa Mereya" |
| News 18 Movie Awards | Best Lyrics | Song: "Channa Mereya" |
| Zee Cine Awards | Song of the Year | Song: "Channa Mereya" |
| 62nd Filmfare Awards | Best Lyricist | Song: "Channa Mereya" |
| 2016 Sansui Colors Stardust Awards | Best Lyricist | Song: "Channa Mereya" |
| 18th IIFA Awards | Best Lyricist | Song: "Channa Mereya" |
| MT20Jubilee Awards | Platinum Disc | Song: "Channa Mereya" |
| 63rd Filmfare Awards | Best Lyricist | Song: "Ullu Ka Patha" |
| Zee Cine Awards | Best Lyricist | Song: "Zaalima" |
| 10th Mirchi Music Awards | Listeners' Choice Album of the Year | Film: Jagga Jasoos |
| 20th IIFA Awards | IIFA Award for Best Lyricist | Song: "Dhadak" |
| 12th Mirchi Music Awards | Lyricist of The Year | Song: "Kalank" |
| 12th Mirchi Music Awards | Song of The Year | Song: "Kalank" |
| 13th Mirchi Music Awards | Lyricist of the Decade | Song: "Channa Mereya" |
| 13th Mirchi Music Awards | Song of The Decade | Song: "Abhi Mujh Mein Kahin" |
| 68th Filmfare Awards | Best Lyricist | Song: "Kesariya" |
| Zee Cine Awards | Best Lyricist | Song: "Kesariya" |
| 23rd IIFA Awards | Best Lyricist | Song: "Kesariya" |
| 15th Mirchi Music Awards | Best Lyricist | Song: Tur Kalleyan |
| 69th Filmfare Awards | Best Lyricist | Song: Tere Vaaste |
