= Shalmali Kholgade =

Indian playback singer

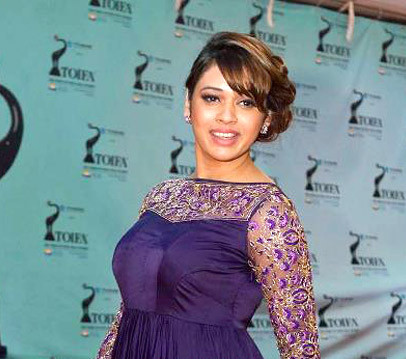
- Kholgade at the TOIFA Awards in 2013
- Born: Shalmali Kholgade; Mumbai, Maharashtra, India
- Occupation: Playback singer
- Years active: 2012–present
- Spouse: Farhan Shaikh (m. 2021)
- Musical career
- Genres: western, classical, pop, filmi
- Instrument: Vocals

Shalmali Kholgade is an Indian playback singer who predominantly sings for Bollywood films. In addition to Hindi, she has also sung in other Indian languages such as Marathi, Bengali, Telugu, and Tamil. She has received several awards including a Filmfare Award and a Filmfare Award Marathi, and has been praised for her singing style.

== Personal life ==
She married Farhan Shaikh, a mixing and mastering engineer, on 22 November 2021.

== Music career ==
=== Career beginning (2004–2011) ===
Shalmali has had her tutelage in music from the age of 8 years under her mother, Uma Kholgade – an Indian classical singer and theatre personality. Shalmali has performed as a soloist with a Latvian troupe in a Cabaret named Bombaloo. She has been singing professionally in Mumbai for several years, and worked as a backing vocalist for Ali Zafar's songs.

=== Playback singing debut and breakthrough (2012–present) ===
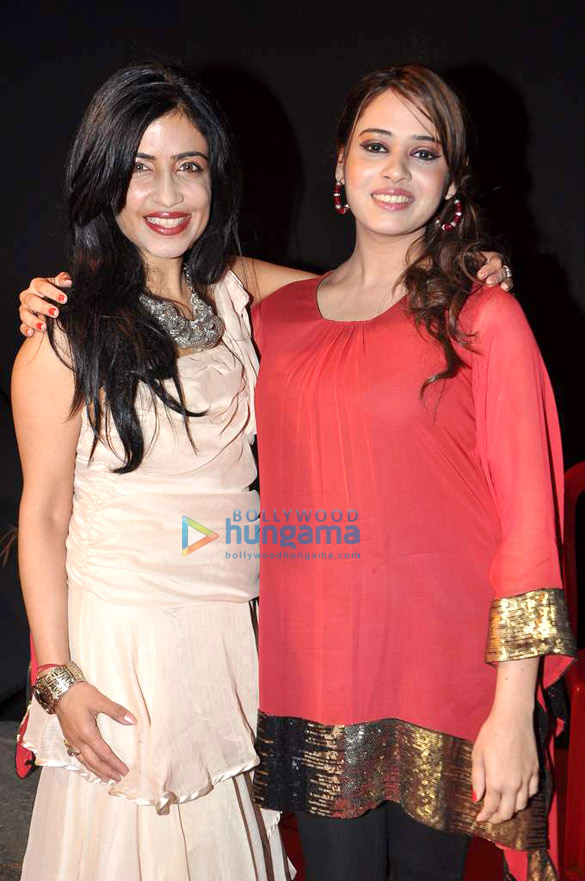
Kholgade with Shibani Kashyap at the Worli Festival in 2013

Shalmali made her debut as a lead vocalist in Bollywood playback singing in 2012 with the song "Pareshaan" from film Ishaqzaade under the music of Amit Trivedi. The song was a critical and commercial success, topping charts across India. For Pareshaan Kholgade won the Filmfare Award for Best Female Playback Singer among several other awards.

Her other two songs in 2012, "Daaru Desi" from Cocktail, and "Aga Bai" from Aiyyaa, both became hits. In 2013, Kholgade's first track, "Lat Lag Gayee" from the movie Race 2 met with immense commercial appreciation. The song remained on the top of the charts for many weeks and became hugely popular in dance clubs. Kholgade received further critical and commercial success with the track "Balam Pichkari" from the movie Yeh Jawaani Hai Deewani. For the song, Kholgade received many nominations including her second Filmfare Award for Best Female Playback Singer nomination. She also sang the title track for Shuddh Desi Romance, "Besharmi Ki Height" and "Shanivar Raati" for Main Tera Hero, "D Se Dance" for Humpty Sharma Ki Dulhania and " Shayarana" for Daawat-E-Ishq, which got her more critical appreciation. She also received praise for the song "Baby Ko Bass Pasand Hai" from the sports drama Sultan (2016).She received critical acclaim for songs, including "Aga Bai" from Aiyyaa (2012),"Chingam Chabake" from Gori Tere Pyaar Mein (2013),"Mohobbat Buri Bemari" from Bombay Velvet (2015), "Shakira" from Welcome to Karachi (2015), and "Naach Meri Jaan" from ABCD 2 (2015).

Kholgade's first regional song "Raja Raja" from the 2013 Tamil film Naan Rajavaga Pogiren was well received. Her song "Oday Oday" from the romantic film Raja Rani was successful in the Southern part of India. She followed this success with further regional hits, "Kala Koi Geli" for the Bengali film Proloy (2013), "Preminchaa" for the Telugu film Toofan (2013), "Maria" from the Bengali film Herogiri (2015), "Jil Jil Jil" for the Telugu film Jil (2015), "Tu Mila" for the Marathi film Timepass 2 (2015), and "Kangaroo" from the Marathi film Highway (2015). She was also one of the judges of the Sony Entertainment Television's reality show Indian Idol Junior for auditions. She also judging the show Sur Nava Dhyas Nava which was aired on Colors Marathi.

Kholgade has released a hit single "Kalle Kalle" on the Valentine's Day of 2020 which celebrates singledom.

Kholgade will make her debut as a music composer with the Marathi film June, set to release in 2020.

== Acting career ==
Shalmali made her film debut with a supporting role in the 2009 Ranjan Singh's East Indian Konkani-Marathi film Tu Maza Jeev, which was released on Maharashtra Day. The film was a moderate success at the Box Office India and earned mixed reviews, however, she was praised for her performance.

== Discography ==
| Year | Film | Song | Language | Ref. |
|---|---|---|---|---|
| 2012 | Ishaqzaade | "Pareshaan" | Hindi | |
| 2012 | Aiyyaa | "Aga Bai" | Hindi | |
| 2012 | Cocktail | "Daaru Desi" | Hindi | |
| 2013 | Akaash Vani | "Rumani" | Hindi | |
| 2013 | Yeh Jawaani Hain Deewani | "Balam Pichkari" | Hindi | |
| 2013 | Naan Rajavaga Pogiren | "Raja Raja" | Tamil | |
| 2013 | Shuddh Desi Romance | "Shuddh Desi Romance" | Hindi | |
| 2013 | Race 2 | "Lat Lag Gayi" | Hindi | |
| 2013 | Gori Tere Pyaar Mein | "Chingam Chabake" | Hindi | |
| 2013 | Phata Poster Nikla Hero | "Hey Mr. DJ" | Hindi | |
| 2013 | Satyagraha | "Janta Rocks' | Hindi | |
| 2014 | Main Tera Hero | "Shanivaar Rati" | Hindi | |
| 2014 | Main Tera Hero | "Besharmi Ki Height" | Hindi | |
| 2014 | Humpty Sharma Ki Dulhania | "D Se Dance" | Hindi | |
| 2014 | Entertainment | "Tera Naam Doon" | Hindi | |
| 2014 | Bindaas | "Bhalobeshe Kono Bhool" | Hindi | |
| 2014 | The Xposé | "Catch Me If You Can" | Hindi | |
| 2014 | The Xposé | "Suroor" | Hindi | |
| 2014 | Daawat-e-Ishq | "Shayrana" | Hindi | |
| 2014 | Action Jackson | "Chichhora Piya" | Hindi | |
| 2015 | Welcome 2 Karachi | "Shakira" | Hindi | |
| 2015 | Bombay Velvet | "Mohabbat Buri Bimari (Version 2)" | Hindi | |
| 2015 | Bezubaan Ishq | "Har Lamha Kar Party" | Hindi | |
| 2015 | ABCD 2 | "Naach Meri Jaan" | Hindi | |
| 2015 | Hero | "Jab We Met" | Hindi | |
| 2015 | Kis Kisko Pyaar Karoon | "DJ Bajega" | Hindi | |
| 2015 | Kyaa Kool Hain Hum 3 | "House Party" | Hindi | |
| 2016 | Sultan | "Baby Ko Bass Pasand Hain" | Hindi | |
| 2016 | Banjo | "Rada" | Hindi | |
| 2016 | Fever | "Mujhme Kabhi" | Hindi | |
| 2017 | Vodka Diaries | "Heeriye" | Hindi | |
| 2017 | Jab Harry Met Sejal | "Beech Beech Mein" | Hindi | |
| 2017 | Simran | "Majaa Ni Life" | Hindi | |
| 2017 | Simran | "Single Rehne De" | Hindi | |
| 2019 | Chicken Curry Law | "Mera Sufi Ishq" | Hindi | |
| 2019 | College Diary | "He Man Maze" | Marathi | |
| 2019 | Bala | "Don't Be Shy" | Hindi | |
| 2020 | Vijeta | "Jinkuya" | Marathi | |
| 2020 | Street Dancer 3D | "Mile Sur" | Hindi | |
| 2021 | Chandigarh Kare Aashiqui | "Kheench Te Nach" | Hindi | |
| 2022 | Gehraiyaan | "Beqaboo" | Hindi | |
| 2023 | Shehzada | "Mere Sawal Ka" | Hindi | |
| 2023 | I Love You | "Rihaa Rihaa" | Hindi | |
| 2023 | Merry Christmas | "Dil Ki Mez" | Hindi | |
| 2024 | Ole Aale | "Zagamaga" | Marathi | |
| 2024 | Alibaba Aani Chalishitale Chor | "Saala Character" | Marathi | |

=== Non-film songs ===
| Year | Song | Co-singer(s) | Composer |
|---|---|---|---|
| 2017 | Tenu Bana Liya | Pankaj Kumar | Pankaj Kumar |
| 2025 | Holo Lolo | Shankuraj Konwar | Shankuraj Konwar |
| 2026 | Tumse Mohabbat Hai | Euphoria Band | Dr. Palash Sen |

== Awards and nominations ==
| Year | Category | Song and Film | Result |
|---|---|---|---|
Mirchi Music Awards
| 2012 | Female Vocalist of The Year | "Pareshaan" (Ishaqzaade) | Nominated |
| 2012 | Upcoming Female Vocalist of The Year | "Pareshaan" (Ishaqzaade) | Nominated |
| 2012 | Upcoming Female Vocalist of The Year | "Aga Bai" (Aiyyaa) | Nominated |
Filmfare Awards
| 2013 | Best Female Playback Singer | "Pareshaan" (Ishaqzaade) | Won |
| 2014 | Best Female Playback Singer | "Balam Pichkari" (Yeh Jawaani Hai Deewani) | Nominated |
Screen Awards
| 2013 | Best Female Playback Singer | "Pareshaan" (Ishaqzaade) | Won |
| 2014 | Best Female Playback Singer | "Balam Pichkari" (Yeh Jawaani Hai Deewani) | Nominated |
International Indian Film Academy Awards
| 2013 | Best Female Playback Singer | "Pareshaan" (Ishaqzaade) | Nominated |
Zee Cine Awards
| 2013 | Sa Re Ga Ma Pa Award for Fresh Singing Talent | "Pareshaan" (Ishaqzaade) | Won |
| 2013 | Best Playback Singer – Female | "Pareshaan" (Ishaqzaade) | Nominated |
| 2014 | Best Playback Singer – Female | "Balam Pichkari" (Yeh Jawaani Hai Deewani) | Nominated |
Times of India Film Awards
| 2013 | Best Playback Singer – Female | "Pareshaan" (Ishaqzaade) | Won |
Stardust Awards
| 2013 | Best Female Playback Singer | "Pareshaan" (Ishaqzaade) | Won |
BIG Star Indian Music Awards
| 2013 | Best Playback Singer – Female | "Pareshaan" (Ishaqzaade) | Nominated |
Star Guild Awards
| 2013 | Best Playback Singer – Female | "Pareshaan" (Ishaqzaade) | Nominated |
Filmfare Awards Marathi
| 2020 | Best Female Playback Singer | 'Querida Querida' Girlfriend | Won |

== See also ==
- List of Indian playback singers
