= Yeh Jawaani Hai Deewani =

2013 Indian film by Ayan Mukerji

- Theatrical release poster
- Directed by: Ayan Mukerji
- Written by: Ayan Mukerji
- Dialogues by: Hussain Dalal
- Produced by: Hiroo Yash Johar; Karan Johar
- Starring: Ranbir Kapoor; Deepika Padukone; Aditya Roy Kapur; Kalki Koechlin
- Cinematography: V. Manikandan
- Edited by: Akiv Ali
- Music by: Pritam
- Production company: Dharma Productions
- Distributed by: UTV Motion Pictures (India); Eros International (overseas)
- Release date: 31 May 2013
- Running time: 159 minutes
- Country: India
- Language: Hindi
- Budget: ₹45 crore
- Box office: ₹326 crore (initial run) ₹26 crore (re-release)

Yeh Jawaani Hai Deewani (transl. "This Youth is Crazy"), also abbreviated as YJHD, is a 2013 Indian Hindi-language coming-of-age romantic comedy film directed by Ayan Mukerji, written by Mukerji and Hussain Dalal, and produced by Karan Johar under Dharma Productions. It stars Ranbir Kapoor, and Deepika Padukone in their second film together, alongside Kalki Koechlin and Aditya Roy Kapur.

Yeh Jawaani Hai Deewani revolves around four former classmates who meet at a trekking trip where Naina Talwar, a shy medical student, falls in love with carefree brat Kabir "Bunny" Thapar but refrains from expressing her feelings. They soon drift apart but end up meeting again at mutual friend Aditi Mehra's wedding. With a production budget of ₹45 crore, the film was extensively shot in Himachal Pradesh, Rajasthan, Paris, Mumbai and Kashmir from March 2012 to January 2013. Pritam composed the original soundtrack and background score, in a first for a Dharma Productions film, marking his second background score project, with cinematography by V. Manikandan. Amitabh Bhattacharya primarily wrote the lyrics, with Kumaar as guest songwriter.

Yeh Jawaani Hai Deewani was released theatrically on 31 May 2013. It was a major box-office success and received critical praise. The film also ended up being the tenth highest grossing Indian film in overseas markets at the time of its release.

At the 59th Filmfare Awards, Yeh Jawaani Hai Deewani received a leading 10 nominations, including Best Film, Best Director (Mukerji), Best Actress (Padukone), Best Actor (Kapoor), Best Supporting Actress (Koechlin) and Best Supporting Actor (Roy Kapur). Since its release in 2013, Yeh Jawaani Hai Deewani has achieved cult status.

== Plot ==
Naina Talwar is a shy, calm and studious medical student living in Mumbai who feels that life is passing her by because of her controlling parents, particularly her mother. While grocery shopping, she encounters her carefree former classmate Aditi Mehra, prompting her to seek more from life. Without telling her parents, she joins Aditi on a hiking trip to the Himalayas in Manali. There, she reconnects with Aditi and their former classmates, the charming and ambitious Kabir "Bunny" Thapar and womanising gambler Avinash "Avi" Arora. Bunny dreams of travelling the world and has no desire to settle down, while Avi is primarily interested in alcohol, women and betting.

During the trek, Naina and Bunny grow close and she falls in love with him. Aditi, meanwhile, becomes jealous when Avi flirts with another trekker. Naina and Bunny realise that Aditi has feelings for Avi, although he does not reciprocate them. At the end of the trip, Avi reveals that Bunny has been accepted into the school of journalism at Northwestern University in Chicago and will leave India in three weeks. Although Avi is upset, Aditi encourages Bunny to go, saying that they are growing up and must become adults. Realising that love and marriage do not fit Bunny's plans, Naina keeps her feelings to herself.

Eight years later, Naina has completed medical school and works at a clinic, while Avi runs a bar in need of costly renovations. Bunny lives in Paris, working as a videographer for a travel show and travelling the world. When the show ends, he accepts an offer to host a new travel programme. He receives a virtual invitation to Aditi's wedding to the wealthy engineer Taran Khanna and travels to Udaipur for the destination wedding. Aditi and Naina are delighted to see him, but Avi is angry that Bunny never kept in touch. They learn that Bunny's father, Sanjay, died while he was abroad. Avi and Bunny argue over their neglected friendship, with Avi criticising Bunny for abandoning them and Bunny accusing Avi of becoming a gambler and alcoholic burdened by debt. They fight until Aditi intervenes. Bunny later offers to pay for Avi's bar renovations, but Avi refuses, saying he only wants Bunny's friendship. They reconcile during a subsequent celebration.

As the wedding festivities continue, Naina and Bunny grow close again, and Bunny becomes attracted to her. They tour Udaipur and discuss their opposing views of life: Bunny wants to travel and experience the world, while Naina dreams of settling down, raising a large family and remaining close to her friends and home. Bunny later worries when he sees Aditi speaking to Avi and Taran arguing with her. Aditi explains that she intended to scold Avi for wasting money on alcohol and poker, while Taran had stopped her to protect her friendship with Avi. She has moved on and is happy with Taran. Bunny realises that he feels similarly about Naina, but becomes jealous when he sees her with another man, claiming to be her boyfriend. Naina admits that she cannot keep seeing him because she will fall in love with him again without knowing whether he feels the same. Bunny kisses her and they confess their love, but neither is willing to abandon their career or lifestyle for the other. They part tearfully.

After Aditi's wedding, Bunny heads to the airport for Paris but recalls leaving India eight years earlier and realises what he is giving up. He returns to Sanjay's home in Mumbai, reconciles with his stepmother Shivani and regrets not seeing his father before his death. Shivani reassures him that Sanjay wanted him to pursue whatever made him happy.

On New Year's Eve, Naina receives a surprise visit from Bunny. He has rejected his dream job in Paris to be with her and proposes marriage. Although Naina worries that he will regret his decision, Bunny insists that he is happy with her and wants to continue travelling, but with her, believing they can build a life together. Naina accepts, and they call Aditi and Avi to wish them a Happy New Year. The film ends with Bunny and Naina embracing.

== Cast ==
- Ranbir Kapoor as Kabir "Bunny" Thapar
- Deepika Padukone as Dr. Naina Talwar
- Aditya Roy Kapur as Avinash "Avi" Arora
- Kalki Koechlin as Aditi "Adi" Mehra Khanna
- Kunaal Roy Kapur as Taran Khanna
- Farooq Sheikh as Sanjay Thapar, Bunny's father
- Tanvi Azmi as Shivani Thapar, Bunny's stepmother
- Dolly Ahluwalia as Simran Talwar, Naina's mother
- Evelyn Sharma as Lara Khanna, Taran's cousin
- Poorna Jagannathan as Riyana Sarai, Bunny's travel show producer and host
- Naveen Kaushik as Sumer Kashyap
- Umar Yadav as Nanoo
- Omar Khan as Dev Johnson
- Anisa Butt as Preeti Salgaonkar
- Nupur Joshi as Esha
- Mayank Saxena
- Mokshad Dodwani
- Kamal Adib as Harish Mehra, Aditi's father
- Rashmi Desai in a cameo appearance with Evelyn
- Nirmal Soni
- Samarth Chaudhary as Professor
- Madhuri Dixit as Mohini in the song "Ghagra" (Special appearance)
- Rana Daggubati as photographer Vikram Jaiswal (Special appearance)
- Ayan Mukerji as DJ in party (Special appearance)

== Production ==
=== Development ===
Yeh Jawaani Hai Deewani was produced by Hiroo Yash Johar and Karan Johar under the banner of Dharma Productions. It was co-produced by Apoorva Mehta and UTV Motion Pictures and written by Hussain Dalal based on a story by Ayan Mukerji. The title was taken from a hit song by the same title, with music by R. D. Burman from the film Jawani Diwani (1972). In December 2011, Pritam was chosen for the first time to compose the music for a Dharma Productions film, steering away from the usual Vishal–Shekhar and Shankar–Ehsaan–Loy, who had previously scored Mukerji's directorial debut, Wake Up Sid (2009).

=== Casting ===
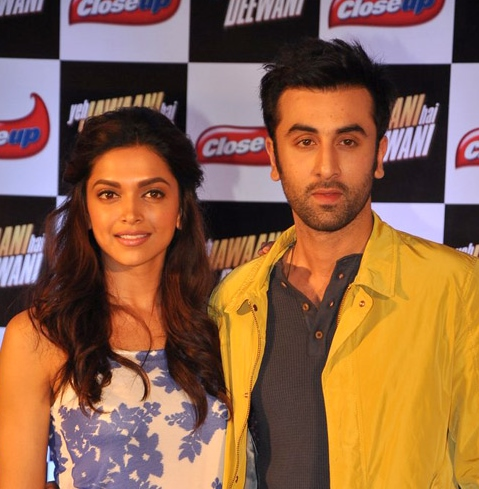
The film marked Ranbir Kapoor and Deepika Padukone's second project after Bachna Ae Haseeno (2008)

Ranbir Kapoor was the first to sign onto the film and was under Ayan Mukerji's direction for the second time following Wake Up Sid (2009). Kapoor played Kabir and also pierced his ears for his role. There was a lot of speculation as to who would play the female lead, with Katrina Kaif and Anushka Sharma being the initial choices. Eventually, Deepika Padukone was chosen as Naina, in September 2011, who due to her faith in Kapoor and Mukerji accepted the film "without even reading the script". The film also marked Kapoor and Padukone's second film together after Bachna Ae Haseeno (2008).

Kalki Koechlin and Aditya Roy Kapur were later signed on for the roles of Aditi and Avi, respectively. Evelyn Sharma was confirmed to play a ditzy character. Kunaal Roy Kapur was then signed to play Taran. Farooq Sheikh was cast as Kabir's father, Tanvi Azmi as Kabir's step mother and Dolly Ahluwalia as Naina's mother.

=== Filming ===
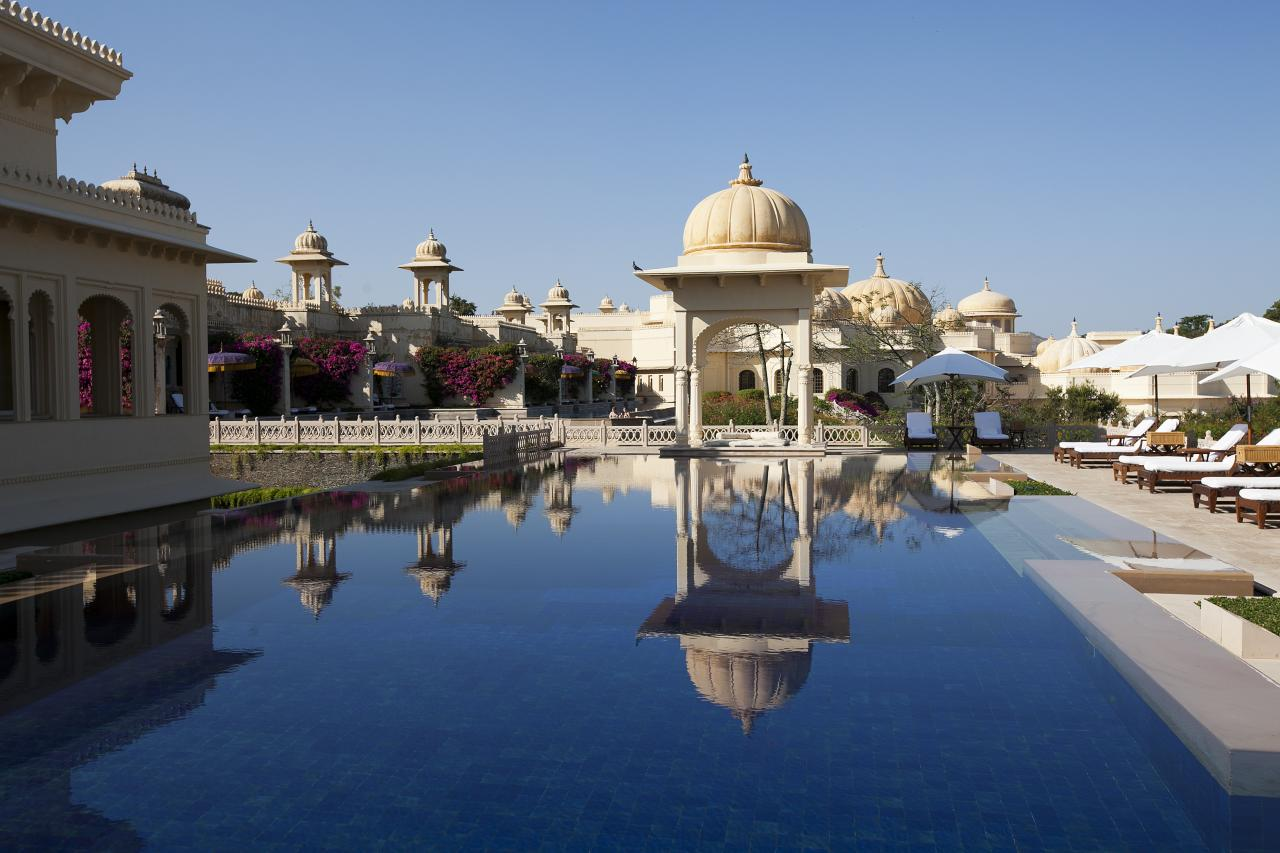
The wedding portion was of the film shot at the Oberoi Udaivilas, Udaipur

The Principal photography commenced in 2012. Shooting locations included Hidimba Temple, Gulaba, Banjar, Hampta Pass, and Naggar and other locations in Himachal Pradesh. Some shots were taken at 14,000 feet above sea level and the crew shot at a temperature as low as −10 degrees Celsius. In May 2012, the cast filmed in Udaipur, where Kapoor and Padukone also shot a romantic song. The wedding sequences were shot at the Oberoi Udaivilas hotel in Udaipur.

The unit experienced a difficult shoot in Rajasthan due to the overwhelming heat. Filming also took place in August 2012 in Paris, France on Rue Mouffetard, a street market and in Nice, France. Some other scenes were shot in Filmistan, Mumbai. On 26 January 2013, the crew visited Kashmir to shoot a musical sequence and other scenes. They filmed at locations such as Kongdori in Gulmarg, Pahalgam and Srinagar.

== Soundtrack ==
The soundtrack and film score were composed by Pritam. The album featured nine tracks; lyrics for eight tracks were written by Amitabh Bhattacharya, whereas one song "Dilliwaali Girlfriend" was written by Kumaar. T-Series purchased the film's music rights. The soundtrack album was released through ITunes on 28 April 2013, for paid subscribers and was officially released through digital and physical formats, the following day (29 April 2013). The tracks "Badtameez Dil" and "Balam Pichkari" topped the music charts upon release and became chartbusters.

== Marketing ==
Nokia India announced its association with Dharma Productions for the film. The official trailer was released by Ayan Mukerji, Karan Johar, Ranbir Kapoor and Deepika Padukone on 19 March 2013 at a press conference in Mumbai. Before its release, Kapoor invited all of his fans to watch the trailer.

=== Pre-release records ===
Yeh Jawaani Hai Deewani Pre-release business
Territories and ancillary revenues	Price
Domestic Distribution Rights (UTV)	₹58 crore (US$9.9 million)
Overseas Distribution Rights (Eros)	₹12 crore (US$2.05 million)
Satellite rights with Sony TV channel	₹30 crore (US$5.12 million)
Music rights (T-Series)	₹7 crore (US$1.19 million)
Total	₹108 crore (US$18.43 million)

- The figures don't include the Print and Advertising (P&A) costs.

== Release ==
Preview screenings of Yeh Jawaani Hai Deewani were held on 30 May 2013. The film was released on 31 May 2013 worldwide and on around 3100 screens in India. It is also going to be released in 2023 although the dates have not been finalized. The trailers of Bhaag Milkha Bhaag, Chennai Express, Once Upon ay Time in Mumbai Dobaara! and Satyagraha – Democracy Under Fire were released with the film prints. Eros distributed Yeh Jawaani Hai Deewani in Israel. It was subtitled in Hebrew and released on 31 May 2013. The last Bollywood film released in Israel was Devdas (2002).

Hindu College organized a special screening of Yeh Jawaani Hai Deewani to create a secure and safe environment for female students on 31 May 2013. It was also notably screened under the "Informative Screening (Feature)" film category at the 2014 Pyongyang International Film Festival in North Korea. Post its release, Yeh Jawaani Hai Deewani was made available on Netflix and Amazon Prime Video.

== Reception ==
=== Critical reception ===
Giving 4 out of 5 stars, Taran Adarsh of bollywoodhungama.com noted that it "is a revitalizing take on romance and relationships. A wonderful cinematic experience, this one should strike a chord with not just the youth, but cineastes of all age-groups." Shubhra Gupta of Indian Express stated: "Yeh Jawaani Hai Deewani is a been-here, seen-this, much-too-long glossy creature, and not much else." Saibal Chatterjee of NDTV rated it 3.5/5: "Overlong, sluggish and fluffy, it meanders through varied locations as the young lovers/friends seek to reconnect with each other after a few years of being apart." Sukanya Verma of Rediff.com gave it 3.5/5 stars and judged, "Yeh Jaawani Hai Deewani is totally worth it!" Alisha Coelho of in.com praised Kapoor's "ebullient" performance and gave it 3.5 stars out of 5.

Rajeev Masand of CNN-IBN gave the film 3 out of 5 stars, concluding "If you are seeking light-hearted mush, you're looking in the right place". Ananya Bhattacharya of ZEENEWS.com said the film "is no heavy or preachy business. It is meant to be enjoyed and it does its job well. Apart from a few parts where the pace of the film drops badly, Mukerji's handiwork is a breezy, enjoyable one." She also gave it 3 out of 5 stars. Tushar Joshi of DNA opined: "YJHD is a well written film that should be watched for its direction, treatment and some remarkable performances." Anupama Chopra of the Hindustan Times gave 2.5 out of 5 stars and wrote, "there is enough eye-candy in Yeh Jawaani Hai Deewani to see you through, but I wish the film had more meat and less dressing. I'm disappointed because there is a truckload of talent here. What rankles is what might have been." Raja Sen of Rediff.com noted that the film was good-looking but lacked a good story. He gave it 2 out of 5 stars.

=== Box office ===
==== India ====
Yeh Jawaani Hai Deewani opened strongly with around 100% occupancy at multiplexes and in the range of 60–70% at single screens where it set the biggest opening for a Ranbir Kapoor film. It holds the records for the fourth biggest opening of all time and highest for a non-holiday release after collecting ₹198 million (US$3.38 million) on its first day. The film remained strong on Saturday and grossed ₹205 million (US$3.5 million). It made ₹630 million (US$10.75 million) on its first weekend, breaking the 3-day weekend box office record previously held by Dabangg 2 (2012). The film remained strong on Monday and grossed the second highest ever Monday collection of ₹128 million (US$2.18 million). It continued its successful run on Tuesday collecting ₹118 million (US$2.01 million) and Wednesday collecting ₹105 million (US$1.79 million), which is the highest ever for any film on that day, bringing its six-day total to ₹980 million (US$16.72 million).

Yeh Jawaani Hai Deewani grossed ₹1.06 billion (US$18.09 million) in its first week, becoming the second fastest Hindi film to cross ₹1 billion (US$17.07 million) behind Ek Tha Tiger (2012). It grossed ₹1.75 billion (US$29.86 million) worldwide in the first seven days. The film made ₹283 million (US$4.83 million), in its second weekend, which is the second highest of all time, making its ten-day gross to ₹1.34 billion (US$22.87 million). It had grossed ₹450 million (US$7.68 million) in its second week, bringing its total to ₹1.52 billion (US$25.94 million). It also had a very good third weekend gross of ₹135 million (US$2.3 million) taking its 17 days total to ₹1.65 billion (US$28.16 million). It grossed ₹205 million (US$3.5 million) in its third week making its total to ₹1.73 billion (US$29.52 million). Yeh Jawaani Hai Deewani grossed ₹1.76 billion (US$30.04 million) after its fourth weekend. Yeh Jawaani Hai Deewani added ₹65.4 million (US$1.12 million) taking its four-week total to ₹1.77 billion (US$30.21 million). Due to a huge reduction of shows from the fifth week, its lifetime total finished around ₹1.9 billion (equivalent to ₹2.8 billion or US$29 million in 2026).

==== Other territories ====
Yeh Jawaani Hai Deewani collected around $4 million on its international opening weekend and is ranked #2 in 2013. The film collected $1,568,677 at the US box office, opening in at #9 position with an average of $9,743 from 161 theatres. It continued its successful run and netted around $7.5 million in ten days. Yeh Jawaani Hai Deewani grossed $8.75 million in 17 days in overseas. It grossed $9.50 million in 24 days in overseas. Yeh Jawaani Hai Deewani finished at $10.50 million approx.

== Controversies ==
Jammu and Kashmir Chief Minister Omar Abdullah expressed his displeasure over the attribution of shots in Yeh Jawaani Hai Deewani to Manali while they were filmed in north Kashmir's Gulmarg. He stated that apart from the temple and Span resort, all scenes were shot in Gulmarg. Many scenes and song sequences were shot at locations in the Kashmir Valley including the famous ski-resort of Gulmarg and Pahalgam. Dharma Productions later clarified that the opening credit slate clearly mentions Chief Minister Omar Abdullah, Tourism Minister G.A. Mir and Inspector-General of Police S.M. Sahal. The names of the entire crew in Kashmir are mentioned in the film credits.

The film's television release had been stalled. The Delhi High Court on 11 June 2013 issued a ruling restraining the TV release of Yeh Jawaani Hai Deewani for allegedly using objectionable dialogues in context of the brand Rooh Afza.

== Accolades ==
At the 59th Filmfare Awards, Yeh Jawaani Hai Deewani received a leading ten nominations. At the 15th IIFA Awards, it got eight nominations and three awards. Elsewhere, it won four Producers Guild Film Awards, two Screen Awards and four Zee Cine Awards.

== Legacy ==
Yeh Jawaani Hai Deewani remains one of the most popular romantic dramas in Hindi cinema. It was named as one of the Bollywood's top ten most romantic movies by The Times of India and Filmfare. Time Out placed the film in its "The 100 best Bollywood movies" list. Ineye Komonibo of Marie Claire listed it as one of the 43 best Bollywood movies of all time. Jasmine Ting of Cosmopolitan cited it as one of the best Indian films. Radhika Menon of Paste listed it as one of the fifteen best Bollywood movies.

Ranbir Kapoor and Deepika Padukone's performance has been noted as one of their most notable works. The film is also considered among the best Bollywood films made on friendship. Padukone's character Naina Talwar, in particular, became highly popular. Anmol Mahato of Film Companion noted: "Naina Talwar starts out as a shy, under-confident person who thinks she is not cool enough but evolves into a person, who is unapologetically in love with herself and her regular dal-chawal life." Padukone later went onto to say about her role, "Naina Talwar came fairly effortlessly to me as I recognized a lot of me in the character." Pinkvilla and Cosmopolitan have named Naina among the strongest and inspirational female characters of Bollywood.

== Re-release ==
Yeh Jawaani Hai Deewani was re-released on 3 January 2025.

=== Box office ===
The film earned ₹1.15 crore on its opening day. The film collected ₹12.15 crore net in its first week. Pinkvilla reported the first week net earnings around 13.05 crore. It collected approximately 26.25 - 26.75 crore in its re-release run, emerging as a success. It currently holds the record for the fourth-highest re-release collection ever for an Indian film.
