= List of awards and nominations received by Arijit Singh =

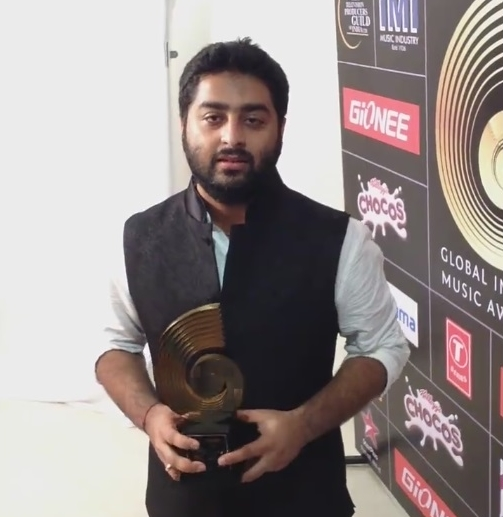
- Arijit Singh at the 5th Global Indian Music Academy Awards in 2014.

Awards and Nominations
Award	Wins	Nominations
National Film Awards	2	2
Filmfare Awards	8	24
Filmfare Awards Bangla	3	13
Filmfare Awards South	0	1
IIFA Awards	5	18
Guild Awards	2	7
GiMA Awards	5*	12
Mirchi Music Awards	27*	116
RMIM Puraskaar	28*	50
Screen Awards	4	11
Zee Cine Awards	7	19
Times of India Film Awards	1	4
- * represents the awards won in more than one category.
- Total
Wins	124+
Nominations	395+

Arijit Singh has received most awards and nominations for the song "Tum Hi Ho" in Aashiqui 2 (2013). He received 9 awards from 10 nominations for this song.

Arijit lent his voice for Pritam-composed 2012 film Barfi! and Vishal–Shekhar-composed Shanghai, where the former fetched him Mirchi Music Award for Upcoming Male Vocalist of The Year award and was nominated, in the same category for the latter. 2013 was the most successful year for Singh where he received numerous praise and awards for his chartbuster song "Tum Hi Ho" in Aashiqui 2. The song fetched him, his first Filmfare, IIFA, Zee Cine and Screen Awards with several other accolades. For the song "Laal Ishq" from Sanjay Leela Bhansali's Goliyon Ki Raasleela Ram-Leela he received a nomination at the GiMA Awards.

In 2014 Singh received 2 nominations in Filmfare Awards for songs "Mast Magan" and "Suno Na Sangemarmar" respectively. He won the GiMA award for the song "Muskurane". He also received several nominations for songs like "Palat", "Humdard" and many more. This year he received his first Filmfare Awards South Nomination in the Telugu Cinema category for the song "Kanulanu Thake" from the movie Manam. He also received nomination in South Indian International Movie Awards for the song "Kanulanu Thake"

2015 was also a successful year for him. This year so many of his songs were chartbusters. In this year he received his second Filmfare Awards for the song "Sooraj Dooba Hain", he was also nominated for the song "Gerua" in the same category. He also received Guild Awards for the song "Hamari Adhuri Kahani". He also won his second Zee Cine Awards for the song "Sooraj Dooba Hain" which he shared along with Mohit Chauhan who won the award for the song "Matargasthi". He has also received Mirchi Music Awards Bangla for the second time for the song "Ke Tui Bol" from the film Herogiri.He also received Best Playback Singer Male Award in the Star Screen Awards and Filmfare Awards 2019 for the song "Ae Watan" from the film Raazi.

He received his first National Film Awards for the song "Binte Dil" from Padmaavat in 2019 for Best Male Playback Singer. He received his second National Film Awards for the song "Kesariya" from Brahmāstra: Part One – Shiva in 2022 for Best Male Playback Singer. He was honoured with the Padma Shri in January 2025 for his contributions in the field of Indian music.

== BIG Star Entertainment Awards ==
The Big Entertainment Awards are presented annually by Reliance Broadcast Network Limited in association with Star India to honour personalities from the field of entertainment across movies, music, television, sports, theater and dance. Singh has received 7 nominations in the category Most Entertaining Singer Male but never won.

Year	Song	Film	Result	Ref.
2013	"Tum Hi Ho"	Aashiqui 2	Nominated	
2014	"Samjhawan"	Humpty Sharma Ki Dulhania	Nominated	
2014	"Muskurane"	CityLights	Nominated	
2015	"Khamoshiyan"	Khamoshiyan	Nominated	
2015	"Sooraj Dooba Hain"	Roy	Nominated	
2016	"Channa Mereya"	Ae Dil Hai Mushkil	Nominated	
2016	"Bolna"	Kapoor & Sons	Nominated	

== Bollywood Hungama Surfer's Choice Music Awards ==
Bollywood Hungama Surfer's Choice Music Awards were presented by Bollywood Hungama to honour the musical work of the artists throughout the year. The winners have been selected based on the number of votes acquired by each of the contenders. These awards have been discontinued after 2015. Singh has received two awards from three nominations in the category Best Male Playback Singer.

Year	Song	Film	Result	Ref.
2013	"Tum Hi Ho"	Aashiqui 2	Won	
2014	"Muskurane"	CityLights	Nominated	
2015	"Gerua"	Dilwale	Won	

== Filmfare Awards ==
The Filmfare Awards are one of the oldest and most prestigious Hindi film awards. They are presented annually by The Times Group for excellence of cinematic achievements. Singh has won 8 Best Male Playback Singer awards from 24 nominations.

Year	Song	Film	Result	Ref.
2014	"Tum Hi Ho"	Aashiqui 2	Won	
2015	"Mast Magan"	2 States	Nominated	
2015	"Suno Na Sangemarmar"	Youngistaan	Nominated	
2016	"Gerua"	Dilwale	Nominated	
2016	"Sooraj Dooba Hain"	Roy	Won	
2017	"Ae Dil Hai Mushkil"	Ae Dil Hai Mushkil	Won	
2017	"Channa Mereya"	Ae Dil Hai Mushkil	Nominated	
2018	"Roke Na Ruke Naina"	Badrinath Ki Dulhania	Won	
2018	"Zaalima"	Raees	Nominated	
2019	"Tera Yaar Hoon Main"	Sonu Ke Titu Ki Sweety	Nominated	
2019	"Ae Watan"	Raazi	Won	
2019	"Binte Dil"	Padmaavat	Nominated	
2020	"Kalank"	Kalank	Won	
2020	"Ve Maahi"	Kesari	Nominated	
2021	"Shayad"	Love Aaj Kal	Nominated	
2021	"Aabad Barbaad"	Ludo	Nominated	
2022	"Lehra Do"	83	Nominated	
2022	"Rait Zara Si"	Atrangi Re	Nominated	
2023	"Kesariya"	Brahmāstra: Part One – Shiva	Won	
2023	"Deva Deva"	Brahmāstra: Part One – Shiva	Nominated	
2023	"Apna Bana Le"	Bhediya	Nominated	
2024	"Lutt Putt Gaya"	Dunki	Nominated	
2024	"Satranga"	Animal	Nominated	
2025	"Sajni"	Laapataa Ladies	Won	

== Filmfare Awards Bangla ==
The Filmfare Awards Bangla (previously Filmfare Awards East) is the Bengali segment of the annual Filmfare Awards, presented by The Times Group to honour both artistic and technical excellence of professionals in the Bengali cinema. Singh has received record 3 Best Male Playback Singer award from record 13 nominations.

Year	Song	Film	Result	Ref.
2014	"Mon Majhi Re"	Boss: Born to Rule	Won	
2014	"Din Khon Mapa Achhe"	Hawa Bodol	Nominated	
2014	"Ki Kore Toke Bolbo"	Rangbaaz	Nominated	
2017	"Tomake Chuye Dilam"	Bastu-Shaap	Nominated	
2018	"Maula Re"	Chaamp	Nominated	
2018	"Tui Chunli Jakhan"	Samantaral	Nominated	
2021	"Maa"	Gotro	Nominated	
2023	"Aajkey Raatey"	Bismillah	Won	
2023	"Bhalobashar Morshum"	X=Prem	Nominated	
2023	"Oboseshe"	Kishmish	Nominated	
2024	"Bhaabo Jodi"	Kabuliwala	Won	
2024	"Jiya Tui Chara"	Biye Bibhrat	Nominated	
2025	"Keu Janbe Na"	Ajogyo	Nominated	

== Filmfare Awards South ==
The Filmfare Awards South is the South Indian segment of the annual Filmfare Awards, presented by The Times Group to honour both artistic and technical excellence of professionals in the South Indian film industry.

=== Telugu ===
Singh has received one Telugu Best Playback Singer nomination without winning it.

Year	Song	Film	Result	Ref.
2015	"Kanulanu Thake"	Manam	Nominated	

== FOI Online Awards ==
FOI Online Awards is an annual online poll, researched, organised and voted by a team of film enthusiasts, honouring the artists for their artworks. The poll is held yearly in the month of January–February to judge the best of the Hindi film industry for their masterpieces in the previous year. The jury follows research and successive rounds of voting to elect nominations and winners.

=== Vocalist - Male ===
Singh has won 5 awards from 17 nominations.

Year	Song	Film	Result	Ref.
2016	"Hamari Adhuri Kahani"	Hamari Adhuri Kahani	Won	
2017	"Channa Mereya"	Ae Dil Hai Mushkil	Won	
2017	"Ae Dil Hai Mushkil"	Ae Dil Hai Mushkil	Nominated	
2017	"Yeh Fitoor Mera"	Fitoor	Nominated	
2018	"Hawayein"	Jab Harry Met Sejal	Won	
2018	"Hareyaa"	Meri Pyaari Bindu	Nominated	
2018	"Yeh Ishq Hai"	Rangoon	Nominated	
2019	"Binte Dil"	Padmaavat	Nominated	
2021	"Aabaad Barbaad"	Ludo	Nominated	
2022	"Rait Zara Si"	Atrangi Re	Nominated	
2022	"Tumhein Mohabbat Hai"	Atrangi Re	Won	
2022	"Ananya"	Toofan	Nominated	
2023	"Muskurahat"	Gangubai Kathiawadi	Nominated	
2023	"Tere Hawaale"	Laal Singh Chaddha	Nominated	
2024	"Main Parwaana"	Pippa	Nominated	
2024	"O Bedardeya"	Tu Jhoothi Main Makkar	Won	
2025	"Vida Karo"	Amar Singh Chamkila	Nominated	

=== Best Original Song ===
(For the category Best Original Song, Composer(s), Lyricist(s) and Singer(s) of the song are credited)

Singh has won 1 award from 13 nominations.

Year	Song	Film	Result	Ref.
2018	"Galti Se Mistake" (along with Music Composer Pritam, Lyricist Amitabh Bhattacharya and Co-Singer Amit Mishra)	Jagga Jasoos	Nominated	
2018	"Hawayein" (along with Music Composer Pritam and Lyricist Irshad Kamil)	Jab Harry Met Sejal	Nominated	
2018	"Yeh Ishq Hai" (along with Music Composer Vishal Bhardwaj and Lyricist Gulzar)	Rangoon	Nominated	
2020	"Dil Hi Toh Hai" (along with Music Composer Pritam, Lyricist Gulzar and Co-Singer Antara Mitra)	The Sky Is Pink	Nominated	
2020	"Ruan Ruan" (along with Music Composer Vishal Bhardwaj and Lyricist Varun Grover)	Sonchiriya	Nominated	
2021	"Hardum Humdum" (along with Music Composer Pritam, Lyricist Sayeed Quadri)	Ludo	Nominated	
2022	“Thode Kam Ajnabi" (along with Lyricist Neelesh Misra and Co-Singer Himani Kapoor)	Pagglait	Nominated	
2022	“Phire Faqeera” (along with Lyricist Neelesh Misra and Co-Singer Raja Kumari, Amrita Singh)	Pagglait	Won	
2023	"Tere Hawaale" (along with Music Composer Pritam, Lyricist Amitabh Bhattacharya and Co-Singer Shilpa Rao)	Laal Singh Chaddha	Nominated	
2023	"La Ilaaj" (along with Music Composer Vishal Bhardwaj and Lyricist Gulzar)	Darlings	Nominated	
2025	"Raat Akeli Thi" (along with Music Composer Pritam, Lyricist Varun Grover and Co-Singer Antara Mitra)	Merry Christmas	Nominated	
2025	"Tenu Sang Rakhna" (along with Music Composer Achint Thakkar, Lyricist Varun Grover and Co-Singer Anumita Nadeshan)	Jigra	Nominated	
2025	"Vida Karo" (along with Music Composer A.R. Rahman, Lyricist Irshad Kamil and Co-Singer Jonita Gandhi)	Amar Singh Chamkila	Nominated	

=== Best Music Direction - Songs ===
Year	Film	Result	Ref.
2022	Pagglait	Nominated	

== Gaana User's Choice Icons ==
Gaana User's Choice Icons was started by Gaana in 2017. The winners are recognized on the basis of tweets on Twitter for each category.

Year	Category	Film	Nominated song	Result	Ref.
2016	Favorite Male Artist	—N/a	Overall Performance During the Year	Won	
2017	Best Male Singer	Half Girlfriend	"Phir Bhi Tumko Chaahunga"	Pending	

== Global Indian Music Academy Awards ==
The Global Indian Music Academy Awards are presented annually by Global Indian Music Academy to honour and recognise Indian music artists. Singh has received five awards from twelve nominations.

=== Best Male Playback Singer ===
Singh has won 2 Best Male Playback Singer awards from 7 nominations.

Year	Song	Film	Result	Ref.
2014	"Tum Hi Ho"	Aashiqui 2	Won	
2014	"Laal Ishq"	Goliyon Ki Raasleela Ram-Leela	Nominated	
2015	"Muskurane"	CityLights	Won	
2015	"Suno Na Sangemarmar"	Youngistaan	Nominated	
2016	"Sooraj Dooba Hain"	Roy	Nominated	
2016	"Aayat"	Bajirao Mastani	Nominated	
2016	"Khamoshiyan"	Khamoshiyan	Nominated	

=== Best Duet ===
Singh has won 2 Best Duet awards from 4 nominations.

Year	Song	Film	Result	Ref.
2014	"Chahun Main Ya Na" (along with Co-Singer Palak Muchhal)	Aashiqui 2	Nominated	
2015	"Manwa Laage" (along with Co-Singer Shreya Ghoshal)	Happy New Year	Nominated	
2015	"Samjhawan" (along with Co-Singer Shreya Ghoshal)	Humpty Sharma Ki Dulhania	Won	
2016	"Soch Na Sake" (along with Co-Singer Tulsi Kumar)	Airlift	Won	

=== Best Live Performer ===
Year	Work	Result	Ref.
2016	Best Live Performer throughout the year	Won	

== Guild Awards ==
The Apsara Film & Television Producers Guild Awards are presented by the Apsara Producers Guild to honour and recognise the professional excellence of their peers. Singh has received two awards from seven nominations. He holds the record of maximum awards and nominations in the Best Male Playback Singer category.

Year	Song	Film	Result	Ref.
2014	"Tum Hi Ho"	Aashiqui 2	Won	
2015	"Aa Raat Bhar"	Heropanti	Nominated	
2015	"Samjhawan"	Humpty Sharma Ki Dulhania	Nominated	
2015	"Humdard"	Ek Villain	Nominated	
2016	"Hamari Adhuri Kahani"	Hamari Adhuri Kahani	Won	
2016	"Khamoshiyan"	Khamoshiyan	Nominated	
2016	"Sooraj Dooba Hain"	Roy	Nominated	

== Gujarati Iconic Film Awards ==
The Gujarati Iconic Film Awards is a yearly award show which honors talents from Gujarati Film Industry.

Year	Song	Film	Result	Ref.
2016	"Satrangi Re"	Wrong Side Raju	Nominated	

== IIFA Awards ==
The IIFA Awards are presented annually by the International Indian Film Academy to honour excellence of cinematic achievements in the Hindi language film industry. Singh has received five awards from seventeen nominations. He holds the record of maximum awards and nominations in the Best Male Playback Singer category.

Year	Song	Film	Result	Ref.
2014	"Tum Hi Ho"	Aashiqui 2	Won	
2015	"Muskurane"	CityLights	Nominated	
2016	"Hamari Adhuri Kahani"	Hamari Adhuri Kahani	Nominated	
2016	"Sooraj Dooba Hain"	Roy	Nominated	
2017	"Channa Mereya"	Ae Dil Hai Mushkil	Nominated	
2018	"Hawayein"	Jab Harry Met Sejal	Won	
2019	"Ae Watan"	Raazi	Won	
2019	"Tera Yaar Hoon Main"	Sonu Ke Titu Ki Sweety	Nominated	
2020	"Dil Hi Toh Hai"	The Sky Is Pink	Nominated	
2020	"Ghungroo"	War	Won	
2022	"Lehra Do"	83	Nominated	
2022	"Rait Zara Si"	Atrangi Re	Nominated	
2022	"Aabaad Barbaad"	Ludo	Nominated	
2023	"Kesariya"	Brahmāstra: Part One – Shiva	Won	
2023	"Deva Deva"	Brahmāstra: Part One – Shiva	Nominated	
2024	"Satranga"	Animal	Nominated	
2024	"Jhoome Jo Pathaan"	Pathaan	Nominated	
2025	"Sajni"	Laapataa Ladies	Nominated	

== INCA Awards ==
The Indian National Cine Academy Awards are presented annually by Producers Guild of India to honour excellence of cinematic achievements in the Indian film industry across 12 languages. Singh has received 1 nominations in the Best Male Playback Singer category.

Year	Song	Film	Language	Result	Ref.
2026	"Khawne Gorachand Khawne Kaala"	Lawho Gouranger Naam Rey	Bengali	Nominated	

== Koimoi Bollywood Audience Poll ==
Koimoi Bollywood Audience Poll is an online poll organised by Koimoi.com for the audience to vote. Singh has won 7 awards from 26 nominations in the category Best Male Playback Singer.

Year	Song	Film	Result	Ref.
2013	"Tum Hi Ho"	Aashiqui 2	Won	
2013	"Illahi"	Yeh Jawaani Hai Deewani	Nominated	
2014	"Samjhawan"	Humpty Sharma Ki Dulhania	Nominated	
2014	"Palat"	Main Tera Hero	Nominated	
2015	"Gerua"	Dilwale	Nominated	
2015	"Sooraj Dooba Hai"	Roy	Nominated	
2015	"Khamoshiyan"	Khamoshiyan	Nominated	
2016	"Channa Mereya"	Ae Dil Hai Mushkil	Won	
2016	"Ae Dil Hai Mushkil"	Ae Dil Hai Mushkil	Nominated	
2016	"Soch Na Sake"	Airlift	Nominated	
2016	"Nashe Si Chad Gayi"	Befikre	Nominated	
2016	"Bolna"	Kapoor & Sons	Nominated	
2016	"Yeh Fitoor Mera"	Fitoor	Nominated	
2017	"Hawayein"	Jab Harry Met Sejal	Nominated	
2017	"Zaalima"	Raees	Nominated	
2017	"Enna Sona"	Ok Jaanu	Nominated	
2018	"Tera Yaar Hoon Main"	Sonu Ke Titu Ki Sweety	Won	
2018	"Aaj Se Teri"	Pad Man	Nominated	
2019	"Tujhe Kitna Chahne Lage"	Kabir Singh	Won	
2019	"Ve Maahi"	Kesari	Nominated	
2019	"Kalank"	Kalank	Nominated	
2020	"Shayad"	Love Aaj Kal	Won	
2020	"Aabad Barbad"	Ludo	Nominated	
2021	"Tumse Bhi Zyada"	Tadap	Nominated	
2022	"Kesariya"	Brahmāstra: Part One – Shiva	Won	
2023	"Chaleya"	Jawan	Won	

== Mirchi Music Awards ==
The Mirchi Music Awards are presented annually by Radio Mirchi to honour both artistic and technical excellence of professionals in the Hindi language film music industry of India. Singh has received 27 awards and 116 nominations.

=== Male Vocalist Of The Year ===
Singh has won 7 awards and 27 nominations in the category Male Vocalist Of The Year.

Year	Song	Film	Result	Ref
2014	"Tum Hi Ho"	Aashiqui 2	Won	
2015	"Samjhawan"	Humpty Sharma Ki Dulhania	Won	
2015	"Manwa Laage"	Happy New Year	Nominated	
2015	"Muskurane"	CityLights	Nominated	
2016	"Sooraj Dooba Hain"	Roy	Nominated	
2016	"Gerua"	Dilwale	Nominated	
2016	"Aayat"	Bajirao Mastani	Nominated	
2016	"Chunar"	ABCD 2	Nominated	
2017	"Ae Dil Hai Mushkil"	Ae Dil Hai Mushkil	Won	
2017	"Channa Mereya"	Ae Dil Hai Mushkil	Nominated	
2017	"Nashe Si Chadh Gayi"	Befikre	Nominated	
2017	"Bolna"	Kapoor & Sons	Nominated	
2018	"Hawayein"	Jab Harry Met Sejal	Won	
2018	"Phir Bhi Tumko Chaahunga"	Half Girlfriend	Nominated	
2018	"Roke Na Ruke Naina"	Badrinath Ki Dulhania	Nominated	
2019	"Binte Dil"	Padmaavat	Nominated	
2019	"Ae Watan"	Raazi	Nominated	
2020	"Tujhe Kitna Chahne Lage"	Kabir Singh	Nominated	
2020	"Kalank"	Kalank	Won	
2022	"Tumhein Mohabbat"	Atrangi Re	Nominated	
2022	"Aabaad Barbaad"	Ludo	Nominated	
2023	"Kesariya"	Brahmāstra: Part One – Shiva	Won	
2023	"Rasiya Reprise"	Brahmāstra: Part One – Shiva	Nominated	
2023	"Phir Na Aisi Raat Ayegi"	Laal Singh Chaddha	Nominated	
2023	"Tur Kalleyan"	Laal Singh Chaddha	Nominated	
2024	"Satranga"	Animal	Won	
2024	"O Bedardeya"	Tu Jhoothi Main Makkaar	Nominated	

=== Song Of The Year ===
Singh has won 6 awards and 20 nominations in the category Song Of The Year.

Year	Song	Film	Result	Ref
2014	"Tum Hi Ho" (along with Music Composer and Lyricist Mithoon)	Aashiqui 2	Won	
2015	"Manwa Laage" (along with Music Composer Vishal–Shekhar, Lyricist Irshad Kamil and Co-Singer Shreya Ghoshal)	Happy New Year	Nominated	
2015	"Muskurane" (along with Music Composer Jeet Gannguli and Lyricist Rashmi Virag)	CityLights	Nominated	
2016	"Sooraj Dooba Hain" (along with Music Composer Amaal Mallik, Lyricist Kumaar and Co-Singer Aditi Singh Sharma)	Roy	Nominated	
2016	"Chunar" (along with Music Composer Sachin–Jigar and Lyricist Mayur Puri)	ABCD 2	Nominated	
2016	"Agar Tum Saath Ho" (along with Music Composer A. R. Rahman, Lyricist Irshad Kamil and Co-Singer Alka Yagnik)	Tamasha	Nominated	
2016	"Gerua" (along with Music Composer Pritam, Lyricist Amitabh Bhattacharya and Co-Singer Antara Mitra)	Dilwale	Won	
2017	"Channa Mereya" (along with Music Composer Pritam and Lyricist Amitabh Bhattacharya)	Ae Dil Hai Mushkil	Won	
2017	"Ae Dil Hai Mushkil" (along with Music Composer Pritam and Lyricist Amitabh Bhattacharya)	Ae Dil Hai Mushkil	Nominated	
2017	"Channa Mereya (Unplugged)" (along with Music Composer Pritam and Lyricist Amitabh Bhattacharya)	Ae Dil Hai Mushkil	Nominated	
2018	"Hawayein" (along with Music Composer Pritam and Lyricist Irshad Kamil)	Jab Harry Met Sejal	Won	
2018	"Roke Na Ruke Naina" (along with Music Composer Amaal Mallik and Lyricist Kumaar)	Badrinath Ki Dulhania	Nominated	
2019	"Ae Watan" (along with Music Composer Shankar–Ehsaan–Loy and Lyricist Gulzar)	Raazi	Nominated	
2020	"Tujhe Kitna Chahne Lage" (along with Music Composer and Lyricist Mithoon)	Kabir Singh	Nominated	
2020	"Ghungroo" (along with Music Composer Vishal–Shekhar, Lyricist Kumaar and Co-Singer Shilpa Rao)	War	Nominated	
2020	"Kalank" (along with Music Composer Pritam and Lyricist Amitabh Bhattacharya)	Kalank	Won	
2022	"Aabaad Barbaad" (along with Music Composer Pritam and Lyricist Sandeep Srivastava)	Ludo	Nominated	
2023	"Kesariya" (along with Music Composer Pritam and Lyricist Amitabh Bhattacharya)	Brahmāstra: Part One – Shiva	Won	
2024	"Chaleya" (along with Music Composer Anirudh Ravichander and Lyricist Kumaar)	Jawan	Nominated	
2024	"O Bedardeya" (along with Music Composer Pritam and Lyricist Amitabh Bhattacharya)	Tu Jhoothi Main Makkaar	Nominated	

=== Album Of The Year ===
Singh has won 9 awards and 39 nominations in the category Album Of The Year.

Year	Film	Result	Ref
2013	Barfi! (along with the musical team of Barfi!)	Nominated	
2013	Cocktail (along with the musical team of Cocktail)	Nominated	
2014	Aashiqui 2 (along with the musical team of Aashiqui 2)	Won	
2014	Yeh Jawaani Hai Deewani (along with the musical team of Yeh Jawaani Hai Deewani)	Nominated	
2014	Goliyon Ki Raasleela Ram-Leela (along with the musical team of Goliyon Ki Raasleela Ram-Leela)	Nominated	
2015	2 States (along with the musical team of 2 States)	Won	
2015	CityLights (along with the musical team of CityLights)	Nominated	
2015	Ek Villain (along with the musical team of Ek Villain)	Nominated	
2015	Gunday (along with the musical team of Gunday)	Nominated	
2015	Queen (along with the musical team of Queen)	Nominated	
2016	Bajirao Mastani (along with the musical team of Bajirao Mastani)	Won	
2016	Roy (along with the musical team of Roy)	Nominated	
2016	ABCD 2 (along with the musical team of ABCD 2)	Nominated	
2016	Badlapur (along with the musical team of Badlapur)	Nominated	
2017	Ae Dil Hai Mushkil (along with the musical team of Ae Dil Hai Mushkil)	Won	
2017	Dangal (along with the musical team of Dangal)	Nominated	
2017	Kapoor & Sons (along with the musical team of Kapoor & Sons)	Nominated	
2018	Jab Harry Met Sejal (along with the musical team of Jab Harry Met Sejal)	Won	
2018	Raabta (along with the musical team of Raabta)	Nominated	
2018	Jagga Jasoos (along with the musical team of Jagga Jasoos)	Nominated	
2019	Padmaavat (along with the musical team of Padmaavat)	Won	
2019	Raazi (along with the musical team of Raazi)	Nominated	
2019	Sonu Ke Titu Ki Sweety (along with the musical team of Sonu Ke Titu Ki Sweety)	Nominated	
2019	Kedarnath (along with the musical team of Kedarnath)	Nominated	
2020	Kesari (along with the musical team of Kesari)	Won	
2020	Kabir Singh (along with the musical team of Kabir Singh)	Nominated	
2020	Kalank (along with the musical team of Kalank)	Nominated	
2022	Atrangi Re (along with the musical team of Atrangi Re)	Nominated	
2022	Dil Bechara (along with the musical team of Dil Bechara)	Nominated	
2022	Love Aaj Kal (along with the musical team of Love Aaj Kal)	Nominated	
2022	Malang (along with the musical team of Malang)	Nominated	
2023	Brahmāstra: Part One – Shiva (along with the musical team of Brahmāstra: Part One – Shiva)	Nominated	
2023	Gangubai Kathiawadi (along with the musical team of Gangubai Kathiawadi)	Nominated	
2023	Laal Singh Chaddha (along with the musical team of Laal Singh Chaddha)	Won	
2024	Animal (along with the musical team of Animal)	Nominated	
2024	Jawan (along with the musical team of Jawan)	Nominated	
2024	Rocky Aur Rani Kii Prem Kahaani (along with the musical team of Rocky Aur Rani Kii Prem Kahaani)	Nominated	
2024	Tu Jhoothi Main Makkaar (along with the musical team of Tu Jhoothi Main Makkaar	Won	
2024	Zara Hatke Zara Bachke (along with the musical team of Zara Hatke Zara Bachke)	Nominated	

=== Other awards ===
Year	Category	Film	Nominated Song	Result	Ref.
2013	Upcoming Male Vocalist of The Year	Barfi!	"Phir Le Aya Dil"	Won	
2013	Upcoming Male Vocalist of The Year	Shanghai	"Duaa"	Nominated	
2013	Song representing Sufi Tradition	Agent Vinod	"Raabta" (along with Pritam, Amitabh Bhattacharya)	Nominated	
2015	Song representing Sufi Tradition	2 States	"Mast Magan" (along with Shankar–Ehsaan–Loy, Amitabh Bhattacharya, Chinmayi Sripada)	Nominated	
2015	Song representing Sufi Tradition	Humpty Sharma Ki Dulhania	"Samjhawan" (along with Sharib-Toshi, Kumaar, Ahmad Anees, Shreya Ghoshal)	Nominated	
2015	Raag-Inspired Song of the Year	CityLights	"Soney Do" (along with Jeet Gannguli, Rashmi Virag)	Won	
2016	Indie Pop Song of the Year	Chal Wahan Jaate Hain	"Chal Wahan Jaate Hain" (along with Amaal Mallik, Rashmi Virag)	Nominated	
2017	Raag-Inspired Song of the Year	Jai Gangaajal	"Sab Dhan Maati (Male)" (along with Salim–Sulaiman, Manoj Muntashir)	Nominated	
2020	Song Producer – Arranging & Programming	Kalank	"Kalank" (along with DJ Phukan, Sunny M. R., Jim Satya, Prasad Sashte)	Nominated	
2022	Upcoming Music Composer of The Year	Pagglait	"Pagal"	Nominated	
2022	Upcoming Music Composer of The Year	Pagglait	"Pagglait"	Nominated	
2022	Upcoming Music Composer of The Year	Pagglait	"Thode Kam Ajanbi"	Won	
2022	Song Producer – Arranging & Programming	Love Aaj Kal	"Shayad" (along with Somanshu Agarwal, Sunny M. R., Zafar Iqbal Ansari)	Nominated	
2023	Raag-Inspired Song of the Year	Gangubai Kathiawadi	"Muskurahat" (along with Music composer Sanjay Leela Bhansali and Lyricist A. M. Turaz)	Nominated	
2023	Listener's Choice Indie Song of the Year	Dhokha	"Dhoka" (along with Music composer Manan Bhardwaj and Lyricist Manan Bhardwaj)	Pending	
2023	Recreated Song of the Year	Bhool Bhulaiyaa 2	"Ami Je Tomar (Tandav)" (along with Re-created Music composer Shubham Shirule - Jam8 and Re-created Lyricist(s) Sameer)	Won	
2024	Recreated Song of the Year	Rocky Aur Rani Kii Prem Kahaani	"What Jhumka" (along with Re-created Music composer Pritam and Re-created Lyricist(s) Amitabh Bhattacharya)	Won	
2024	Listener's Choice Indie Song of the Year	Heeriye	"Heeriye" (along with Music composer Jasleen Royal and Lyricist Aditya Sharma)	Nominated	
2024	Indie Song of the Year	Heeriye	"Heeriye" (along with Music composer Jasleen Royal and Lyricist Aditya Sharma)	Nominated	
2024	Indie Song of the Year	Kasam Se	"Kasam Se" (along with Music composer Shekhar Ravjiani and Lyricist Priya Saraiya)	Nominated	

=== Decade awards ===
Year	Category	Film	Nominated Song	Result	Ref.
2021	Male Vocalist of The Decade	Aashiqui 2	"Tum Hi Ho"	Nominated	
2021	Male Vocalist of The Decade	Ae Dil Hai Mushkil	"Ae Dil Hai Mushkil"	Nominated	
2021	Male Vocalist of The Decade	Jab Harry Met Sejal	"Hawayein"	Nominated	
2021	Male Vocalist of The Decade	Kalank	"Kalank"	Nominated	
2021	Song of The Decade	Aashiqui 2	"Tum Hi Ho" (along with Mithoon)	Nominated	
2021	Song of The Decade	Ae Dil Hai Mushkil	"Channa Mereya" (along with Pritam, Amitabh Bhattacharya)	Nominated	
2021	Song of The Decade	Kalank	"Kalank" (along with Pritam, Amitabh Bhattacharya)	Nominated	
2021	Album of The Decade	Aashiqui 2	(along with the musical team of Aashiqui 2)	Nominated	
2021	Album of The Decade	Bajirao Mastani	(along with the musical team of Bajirao Mastani)	Nominated	
2021	Album of The Decade	Ae Dil Hai Mushkil	(along with the musical team of Ae Dil Hai Mushkil)	Nominated	
2021	Raag-Inspired Song of the Decade	CityLights	"Soney Do" (along with Jeet Gannguli, Rashmi Virag)	Nominated	

== Mirchi Music Awards Bangla ==
Mirchi Music Awards Bangla is the Bengali segment of the annual Mirchi Music Awards, presented by Radio Mirchi to honour both artistic and technical excellence of professionals in the Bengali language film music industry of India. Singh has received 4 awards from 15 nominations in the category Male Vocalist Of The Year.

=== Male Vocalist Of The Year ===
Year	Song	Film	Result	Ref.
2014	"Mon Majhi Re"	Boss	Won	
2014	"Bojhena Se Bojhena"	Bojhena Shey Bojhena	Nominated	
2014	"Theme Jaye Megh"	C/O Sir	Nominated	
2014	"Din Khon Mapa Ache"	Hawa Bodol	Nominated	
2014	"Baalir Shawhor"	Mishawr Rawhoshyo	Nominated	
2015	"Apur Payer Chhap"	Apur Panchali	Nominated	
2015	"O Re Mon Udashi"	Bangali Babu English Mem	Nominated	
2015	"Parbo Naa (Revisited)"	Borbaad	Nominated	
2016	"Kichhu Kichhu Kotha"	Lorai	Nominated	
2016	"Ke Tui Bol"	Herogiri	Won	
2016	"Moneri Majhe Jeno"	Abby Sen	Nominated	
2017	"Thik Emon Ebhabe"	Gangster	Nominated	
2023	"Aajkey Raatey"	Bismillah	Won	
2023	"Bhalobashar Morshum"	X=Prem	Nominated	
2024	"Jiya Tui Chara"	Biye Bibhrat	Won	

== National Film Awards ==
The National Film Awards is the most prestigious film award ceremony in India. Established in 1954, it is administered by the International Film Festival of India and the Indian government's Directorate of Film Festivals. The awards are presented by the President of India. Due to their national scale, they are considered to be the equivalent of the American Academy Awards.

Arijit Singh has won the award two times for Best Male Playback Singer.

Year	Song	Film	Language	Result	Ref.
2018	"Binte Dil"	Padmaavat	Hindi	Won	
2022	"Kesariya"	Brahmastra	Hindi	Won	

== RMIM Puraskaar ==
The RMIM Puraskaar borrows its name from the news group rec.music.Indian.misc, the oldest community of Hindi film music lovers on the net. These awards voice the opinion of HFM listeners scattered all over the Internet including on forums, groups, blogs, and social networks. Arijit Singh has won a record 28 awards from 50 nominations in different categories till date.

Year	Category	Film	Nominated song	Result	Ref.
2012	Male Singer of the Year	Overall Performance During the Year		Won	
2012	Best Sung Solo Song	Barfi!	"Phir Le Aya Dil"	Won	
2012	Song of The Year	Barfi!	"Phir Le Aya Dil"	Won	
2012	Satish Kalra Sammaan	Barfi!	(along with the musical team of Barfi!)	Won	
2013	Best Sung Solo Song	Goliyon Ki Raasleela Ram-Leela	"Laal Ishq"	Nominated	
2014	Male Singer of the Year	Overall Performance During the Year		Won	
2014	Best Sung Solo Song	Haider	"Gulon Mein Rang Bhare"	Nominated	
2014	Best Sung Solo Song	Haider	"Khul Kabhi"	Nominated	
2014	Satish Kalra Sammaan	Haider	(along with the musical team of Haider)	Won	
2014	Satish Kalra Sammaan	Queen	(along with the musical team of Queen)	Won	
2015	Male Singer of the Year	Overall Performance During the Year		Won	
2015	Satish Kalra Sammaan	Bajirao Mastani	(along with the musical team of Bajirao Mastani)	Won	
2016	Male Singer of the Year	Overall Performance During the Year		Won	
2016	Best Sung Solo Song	Ae Dil Hai Mushkil	"Channa Mereya"	Nominated	
2017	Male Singer of the Year	Overall Performance During the Year		Won	
2017	RMIM Samman	Jab Harry Met Sejal	(along with the musical team of Jab Harry Met Sejal)	Won	
2018	Male Singer of the Year	Overall Performance During the Year		Won	
2018	Best Sung Solo Song	Raazi	"Raazi"	Nominated	
2018	Best Sung Duet Song	Laila Majnu	"Aahista"(along with Jonita Gandhi)	Nominated	
2019	Male Singer of the Year	Overall Performance During the Year		Won	
2019	Best Sung Solo Song	Sonchiriya	"Ruan Ruan"	Nominated	
2010–2019	Singer of the Decade	Overall Performance During the Decade		Won	
2020	Male Singer of the Year	Overall Performance During the Year		Won	
2020	Best Sung Solo Song	Ludo	"Hardum Humdum"	Nominated	
2020	Best Sung Solo Song	Love Aaj Kal	"Shayad"	Nominated	
2020	Best Sung Solo Song	Chhapaak	"Chhapaak"	Nominated	
2020	Best Sung Duet Song	Dil Bechara	"Khulke Jeene Ka"(along with Shashaa Tirupati)	Nominated	
2020	RMIM Samman	Love Aaj Kal	(along with the musical team of Love Aaj Kal)	Won	
2020	RMIM Samman	Dil Bechara	(along with the musical team of Dil Bechara)	Won	
2021	Male Singer of the Year	Overall Performance During the Year		Won	
2021	Best Sung Solo Song	Atrangi Re	"Tumhein Mohabbat Hai"	Won	
2021	Best Sung Solo Song	Toofaan	"Ananya"	Nominated	
2021	Best Sung Duet Song	Pagglait	"Thode Kam Ajnabi"(along with Himani Kapoor)	Nominated	
2021	RMIM Samman	Atrangi Re	(along with the musical team of Atrangi Re)	Won	
2021	RMIM Samman	Pagglait	(along with the musical team of Pagglait)	Won	
2022	Male Singer of the Year	Overall Performance During the Year		Won	
2022	Best Sung Solo Song	Bhool Bhulaiyaa 2	"Mere Dholna"	Nominated	
2022	Best Sung Duet Song	Laal Singh Chaddha	"Tere Hawaale"(along with Shilpa Rao)	Nominated	
2023	Male Singer of the Year	Overall Performance During the Year		Won	
2023	Best Sung Duet Song	Pippa	"Main Parwaana"	Won	
2023	Song of the Year	Pippa	"Main Parwaana"	Won	
2023	Best Composed and Arranged Non-Film Songs	Barkhaa	"Barkhaa"	Nominated	
2024	Male Singer of the Year	Overall Performance During The Year		Won	
2024	Song Of The Year	Amar Singh Chamkila	"Vida Karo" (along with Jonita Gandhi)	Won	
2024	Best Sung Duet Song	Amar Singh Chamkila	"Vida Karo" (along with Jonita Gandhi)	Won	
2024	Best Sung Duet Song	Merry Christmas	"Raat Akeli Thi"	Nominated	
2024	Best Sung Solo Song	Laapataa Ladies	"Sajni"	Nominated	
2025	Male Singer of the Year	Overall Performance During The Year		Won	
2025	Best Sung Solo Song	Gustaakh Ishq	"Aap Is Dhoop Mein"	Nominated	
2025	Best Sung Solo Song	Metro... In Dino	"Qaayade Se"	Nominated	
2025	Best Sung Duet Song	Azaad	"Ajeeb-O-Gareeb"	Nominated	
2025	Best Sung Non-film Song	Bhoomi 2025	"Sukoon"	Nominated	

== Screen Awards ==
The Screen Awards honour excellence of cinematic achievements in the Hindi film industry. Singh has received 4 awards from 11 nominations. He holds the record of maximum awards in Best Male Playback Singer category.

Year	Song	Film	Result	Ref.
2014	"Tum Hi Ho"	Aashiqui 2	Won	
2015	"Muskurane"	CityLights	Won	
2015	"Samjhawan"	Humpty Sharma Ki Dulhania	Nominated	
2017	"Channa Mereya"	Ae Dil Hai Mushkil	Nominated	
2018	"Hawayein"	Jab Harry Met Sejal	Nominated	
2018	"Zaalima"	Raees	Won	
2018	"Galti Se Mistake"	Jagga Jasoos	Won	
2019	"Ae Watan"	Raazi	Won	
2020	"Ve Maahi"	Kesari	Nominated	
2026	"Gehra Hua"	Dhurandhar	Nominated	
2026	"Dhun"	Saiyaara	Nominated	

== South Indian International Movie Awards ==
South Indian International Movie Awards, also known as the SIIMA Awards rewards the artistic and technical achievements of the South Indian film industry.

=== Telugu ===
Singh has received one nomination in the category Best Male Playback Singer.

Year	Song	Film	Result	Ref.
2015	"Kanulanu Thaake"	Manam	Nominated	

== Stardust Awards ==
The Stardust Awards is an award ceremony for Hindi movies, which congratulate the superstars of the new generation who are making an impact on the future. It is sponsored by Stardust magazine. Singh has won one award from eight nominations in the category Best Male Playback Singer.

Year	Song	Film	Result	Ref.
2014	"Muskurane"	CityLights	Nominated	
2014	"Palat"	Main Tera Hero	Nominated	
2014	"Suno Na Sangemarmar"	Youngistaan	Nominated	
2015	"Hamari Adhuri Kahani"	Hamari Adhuri Kahani	Nominated	
2015	"Khamoshiyan"	Khamoshiyan	Nominated	
2016	"Channa Mereya"	Ae Dil Hai Mushkil	Won	
2016	"Ae Dil Hai Mushkil	Ae Dil Hai Mushkil	Nominated	
2016	"Yeh Fitoor Mera"	Fitoor	Nominated	

== Tele Cine Awards ==
Tele Cine Awards are presented annually for the work in the Bengali film and television industry. Singh has one award from six nominations in Best Playback Singer Male category.

Year	Song	Film	Result	Ref.
2013	"Bojhena Shey Bojhena"	Bojhena Shey Bojhena	Won	
2015	"Ke Tui Bol"	Herogiri	Nominated	
2016	"Egiye De"	Shudhu Tomari Jonyo	Nominated	
2017	"Tomake Chai"	Gangster	Nominated	
2018	"Maula Re"	Chaamp	Nominated	
2023	"Keu Jaane Naa"	Raavan	Nominated	

== Times of India Film Awards ==
The Times of India Film Awards are presented by The Times of India to honour both artistic and technical excellence of professionals in the Hindi language film industry of India. Singh has won one award from four nominations in the Best Male Playback Singer category.

Year	Song	Film	Result	Ref.
2016	"Hamari Adhuri Kahani"	Hamari Adhuri Kahani	Nominated	
2016	"Aayat"	Bajirao Mastani	Nominated	
2016	"Chunar"	ABCD 2	Nominated	
2025	"Sajni"	Laapataa Ladies	Won	

== West Bengal Film Journalists' Association Awards ==
The West Bengal Film Journalists' Association Awards (WBFJA Awards) are presented by the West Bengal Film Journalists' Association for the Bengali Film Industry.

=== Best Male Playback Singer ===
Singh has won 2 Best Male Playback Singer awards and 8 nominations. He holds the record for the most awards and nominations in this category.

Year	Song	Film	Result	Ref.
2017	"Tomake Chai"	Gangster	Nominated	
2018	"Dugga Ma"	Bolo Dugga Maiki	Nominated	
2018	"Maula Re"	Chaamp	Won	
2021	"Abar Phire Ele"	Dwitiyo Purush	Nominated	
2023	"Bhalobashar Morshum"	X=Prem	Won	
2023	"Oboseshe"	Kishmish	Nominated	
2024	"Jiya Tui Chara"	Biye Bibhrat	Nominated	
2025	"Keu Janbe Na"	Ajogyo	Nominated	

=== Best Background Score ===
Year	Film	Result	Ref.
2020	Kedara	Nominated	

== Zee Cine Awards ==
The Zee Cine Awards are presented by Zee Network for the Hindi film industry. The awards were inaugurated in 1998 and include categories decided by public votes and an industry jury. Singh has received 7 awards from 19 nominations. He holds the record of maximum awards and nominations in Best Male Playback Singer category.

Year	Song	Film	Result	Ref.
2014	"Tum Hi Ho"	Aashiqui 2	Won	
2016	"Sooraj Dooba Hain"	Roy	Won	
2016	"Gerua"	Dilwale	Nominated	
2017	"Ae Dil Hai Mushkil"	Ae Dil Hai Mushkil	Won	
2017	"Channa Mereya"	Ae Dil Hai Mushkil	Nominated	
2017	"Alizeh"	Ae Dil Hai Mushkil	Nominated	
2018	"Phir Bhi Tumko Chaahunga"	Half Girlfriend	Nominated	
2018	"Zaalima"	Raees	Nominated	
2018	"Hawayein"	Jab Harry Met Sejal	Nominated	
2019	"Ae Watan"	Raazi	Nominated	
2020	"Ve Maahi"	Kesari	Nominated	
2020	"Pal Pal Dil Ke Paas"	Pal Pal Dil Ke Paas	Won	
2023	"Kesariya"	Brahmāstra: Part One – Shiva	Won	
2023	"Apna Bana Le"	Bhediya	Nominated	
2024	"Jhoome Jo Pathaan"	Pathaan	Won	
2025	"Sajni"	Laapataa Ladies	Won	
2026	"Gehra Hua"	Dhurandhar	Nominated	
2026	"Aavan Jaavan"	War 2	Nominated	
2026	"Tere Ishk Mein"	Tere Ishk Mein	Nominated	

== Other awards ==
Year	Nominated work and artist	Award	Result	Ref.
2014	"Tum Hi Ho" – Aashiqui 2	Gaana Awards for Most Popular Singer (Male)	Won	
2014	"Tum Hi Ho" – Aashiqui 2	IBNLive Movie Awards – Best Male Playback Singer	Won	
2014	"Sawan Aaya Hai" – Creature 3D	Indian Cinema Magazine UK Awards – Best Male Playback Singer	Won	
2015	"Muskurane" – CityLights	IBNLive Movie Awards – Best Male Playback Singer	Won	
2017	"Ae Dil Hai Mushkil" – Ae Dil Hai Mushkil	Best Singer (Male)	Won	
2024	"Tum Kya Mile" – Rocky Aur Rani Kii Prem Kahaani	Bollywood Hungama Best of 2023 – Best Male Playback Singer	Won	
2024	"Satranga" – Animal	Pinkvilla Screen & Style Icons Awards – Best Playback Singer Male	Won	
2025	"Entertainment"	CNN-News18 Indian of the Year	Won	
2026	"Zamaana Lage" – Metro... In Dino	IFTA Award – Most Popular Bollywood Male Playback Singer	Won	
