= 9th Mirchi Music Awards =

Indian film music awards in 2017

- Sponsored by: Royal Stag
- Date: February 18, 2017
- Location: Dome @ NSCI, Mumbai
- Country: India
- Presented by: Radio Mirchi
- Hosted by: Sonu Nigam

Highlights
- Most awards: Ae Dil Hai Mushkil (5)
- Most nominations: Ae Dil Hai Mushkil (18)
- Song of the Year: "Channa Mereya" - Ae Dil Hai Mushkil
- Album of the Year: Ae Dil Hai Mushkil
- Website: Music Mirchi Awards 2016

Television/radio coverage
- Network: Zee TV

The 9th Mirchi Music Awards, presented by the Radio Mirchi, honoured the best of Hindi music from the year 2016. The ceremony was held on 18 February 2017 at the Dome @ National Sports Club of India, Mumbai and was hosted by Sonu Nigam. There were many performances, including those by Amit Trivedi, Papon, Badshah, Armaan Malik, Sukhwinder Singh, Jubin Nautiyal, Shalmali Kholgade, Neeti Mohan, Neha Bhasin. It was the first time that the ceremony was open to the public. Ae Dil Hai Mushkil won a leading five awards including Album of the Year and Song of the Year for "Channa Mereya". The show was broadcast on 19 March 2017 on Zee TV.

== Winners and nominees ==
The winners were selected by the members of jury, chaired by Javed Akhtar. The following are the names of nominees and winners.

(Winners are listed first, highlighted in boldface.)

=== Film awards ===
Song of the Year	Album of the Year
**"Channa Mereya"** - **Ae Dil Hai Mushkil**; "Ae Dil Hai Mushkil" - Ae Dil Hai Mushkil; "Bulleya" - Ae Dil Hai Mushkil; "Channa Mereya (Unplugged)" - Ae Dil Hai Mushkil; "Haanikaarak Bapu" - Dangal; "Jag Ghoomeya" - Sultan	**"Ae Dil Hai Mushkil"** - **Pritam, Amitabh Bhattacharya**; "Dangal" - Pritam, Amitabh Bhattacharya; "Kapoor & Sons" - Amaal Mallik, Arko Pravo Mukherjee, Nucleya, Tanishk Bagchi, Abhiruchi Chand, Devendra Kafir, Manoj Muntashir, Kumaar; "Sultan" - Vishal–Shekhar, Irshad Kamil; "Udta Punjab" - Amit Trivedi, Shiv Kumar Batalvi, Shellee, Varun Grover
Male Vocalist of the Year	Female Vocalist of the Year
**Arijit Singh - "Ae Dil Hai Mushkil"** from **Ae Dil Hai Mushkil**; Arijit Singh - "Channa Mereya" from Ae Dil Hai Mushkil; Arijit Singh - "Nashe Si Chadh Gayi" from Befikre; Arijit Singh - "Bolna" from Kapoor & Sons; Amit Mishra - "Bulleya" from Ae Dil Hai Mushkil; Rahat Fateh Ali Khan - "Jag Ghoomeya" from Sultan	**Jonita Gandhi - "Gilheriyan"** from **Dangal**; Jonita Gandhi - "The Breakup Song" from Ae Dil Hai Mushkil; Neha Bhasin - "Jag Ghoomeya" from Sultan; Qurat-ul-Ain Balouch - "Kaari Kaari" from Pink; Shilpa Rao - "Bulleya" from Ae Dil Hai Mushkil
Music Composer of the Year	Lyricist of the Year
**Pritam - "Ae Dil Hai Mushkil"** from **Ae Dil Hai Mushkil**; Amit Trivedi - "Ikk Kudi" from Udta Punjab; Pritam - "Channa Mereya" from Ae Dil Hai Mushkil; Pritam - "Bulleya" from Ae Dil Hai Mushkil; Vishal–Shekhar - "Jag Ghoomeya" from Sultan	**Amitabh Bhattacharya - "Channa Mereya"** from **Ae Dil Hai Mushkil**; Amitabh Bhattacharya - "Ae Dil Hai Mushkil" from Ae Dil Hai Mushkil; Amitabh Bhattacharya - "Bulleya" from Ae Dil Hai Mushkil; Amitabh Bhattacharya - "Haanikaraak Bapu" from Dangal; Irshad Kamil - "Jag Ghoomeya" from Sultan
Upcoming Male Vocalist of the Year	Upcoming Female Vocalist of the Year
**Sarwar Khan and Sartaz Khan Barna - "HaaniKaarak Bapu"** from **Dangal**; Arko Pravo Mukherjee - "Dariya" from Baar Baar Dekho; Arko Pravo Mukherjee - "Tere Bin Yaara" from Rustom; Jaswinder Singh Bunty - "Tumhe Bhi Meri Yaad" from 30 Minutes; Yasser Desai - "Rang Reza" from Beiimaan Love	**Asees Kaur - "Bolna"** from **Kapoor & Sons**; Aakanksha Sharma - "Tu Alvida" from Traffic; Aakanksha Sharma - "Dhal Jaun Main" from Rustom; Asees Kaur - "Rang Reza" from Beiimaan Love; Qurat-ul-Ain Balouch - "Kaari Kaari" from Pink
Upcoming Music Composer of The Year	Upcoming Lyricist of The Year
**Tanishk Bagchi - "Bolna"** from **Kapoor & Sons**; Asad Khan - "Rang Reza (Female)" from Beiimaan Love; Jasleen Royal - "Raatein" from Shivaay; Rohan Vinayak - "Maula" from Nil Battey Sannata; Tanishk Bagchi - "Allah Hu Allah" from Sarbjit	**Abhiruchi Chand - "Buddhu Sa Mann"** from **Kapoor & Sons**; Aditya Sharma - "Raatein" from Shivaay; Deepak Ramola and Gurpreet Saini - "Atrangi Yaar" from Wazir; Raj Ranjodh - "Chal Utth Bandeya" from Do Lafzon Ki Kahani; Shreyas Jain - "Maa" from Nil Battey Sannata
Raag-Inspired Song of the Year
**"Meherbaan"** - **Sarbjit**; "Sab Dhan Maati (Male)" - Jai Gangaajal; "Kaaga" - Mirzya; "Jag Ghoomeya" - Sultan; "Ikk Kudi" - Udta Punjab

=== Technical awards ===
Best Song Producer (Programming & Arranging)	Best Song Engineer (Recording & Mixing)
**Santosh Mulekar and Shankar–Ehsaan–Loy - "Kaaga"** from **Mirzya**; Aditya Pushkarna, Dj Phukan, Sunny M.R. and Anurag Saikia - "Dhaakad" from Dangal; Sourav Roy - "Jabra Fan" from Fan; Shankar–Ehsaan–Loy - "Mirzya" from Mirzya; Kiran Kamath - "Baby Ko Bass Pasand Hai" from Sultan	**Vijay Dayal - "Jabra Fan"** from **Fan**; Eric Pillai - "Beat Pe Booty" from A Flying Jatt; Shadab Rayeen, Sunny M.R. and Ashwin Kulkarni - "Bulleya" from Ae Dil Hai Mushkil; Shadab Rayeen, Sunny M.R. and Ashwin Kulkarni - "Dhaakad" from Dangal; Tanay Gajjar, Abhay Rumde, Gaurav Gupta, Manasi Tare, Abhishek Khandelwal and Shantanu Hudlikar - "Mirzya" from Mirzya
Best Background Score
**Tubby-Parik - Mirzya**; Julius Packiam - Sultan; Pritam - Ae Dil Hai Mushkil; Pritam - Dangal; Shantanu Moitra - Pink

=== Non-film awards ===
Indie Pop Song of the Year
- **"Aye Jahaan Aasmaan"** sung by **Sonu Nigam and Shreya Ghoshal**
  - "Befikra" sung by Aditi Singh Sharma and Meet Bros
  - "Sab Rab De Bande" sung by 6 Pack Band, Sonu Nigam and Tajinder Singh
  - "Yeh Dil" sung by Hariharan
  - "Dooriyan" sung by Tochi Raina

=== Special awards ===
Lifetime Achievement Award	Usha Uthup
Royal Stag Make It Large Award	Karan Johar

=== Listeners' Choice awards ===
Listeners' Choice Song of the Year	"Soch Na Sake" - Airlift
Listeners' Choice Album of the Year	Dangal

=== Jury awards ===
Outstanding Contribution to Hindi Film Music	Y. S. Mulky
Best Album of Golden Era (1956)	Basant Bahar

=== Films with multiple wins and nominations ===
Films that received multiple nominations
Nominations	Film
18	Ae Dil Hai Mushkil
9	Sultan
8	Dangal
5	Kapoor & Sons
5	Mirzya
3	Beiimaan Love
3	Pink
3	Udta Punjab
2	Fan
2	Nil Battey Sannata
2	Rustom
2	Sarbjit
2	Shivaay

Films that received multiple awards
Wins	Film
5	Ae Dil Hai Mushkil
3	Dangal‡
3	Kapoor & Sons
2	Mirzya

‡ Won a Listeners' Choice award

== Jury ==
The jury was chaired by Javed Akhtar. Other members were:

- Alka Yagnik - playback singer
- Milind Srivastava - music director
- Anu Malik - music director
- Anuradha Paudwal - playback singer
- Ila Arun - actress and folk singer
- Irshad Kamil - lyricist
- Lalit Pandit - composer
- Kavita Krishnamurthy - playback singer
- Louis Banks - composer, record producer and singer
- Madhur Bhandarkar - director, writer and producer
- Pankaj Udhas - singer
- Prasoon Joshi - lyricist and screenwriter
- Pritam - music director and composer
- Ramesh Sippy - director and producer
- Roop Kumar Rathod - playback singer and music director
- Sadhana Sargam - playback singer
- Sulemaan - composer
- Sameer - lyricist
- Sapna Mukherjee - playback singer
- Shaan - playback singer
- Shailendra Singh - playback singer
- Subhash Ghai - director, producer and screenwriter
- Sudhir Mishra - director and screenwriter
- Suresh Wadkar - playback singer
- Talat Aziz - singer
- Udit Narayan - playback singer
- Vijay Krishna Acharya - director and screenwriter

== See also ==
- Mirchi Music Awards
