= 18th IIFA Awards =

Indian film award ceremony in 2017

- Date: 14 July 2017– 15 July 2017
- Site: MetLife Stadium; East Rutherford, New Jersey, USA
- Hosted by: Karan Johar; Saif Ali Khan
- Acts: A.R. Rahman; Salman Khan; Katrina Kaif; Shahid Kapoor; Kriti Sanon; Sushant Singh Rajput; Diljit Dosanjh; Alia Bhatt; Varun Dhawan
- Website: http://www.iifa.com

Television/radio coverage
- Network: Colors TV
- Produced by: Wizcraft International

The 2017 IIFA Awards, officially known as the 18th International Indian Film Academy Awards ceremony, presented by the International Indian Film Academy honouring the best Hindi films of 2016, occurred in MetLife Stadium in East Rutherford, New Jersey on 14–15 July 2017. It was the first time that the awards held there and also IIFA returned to United States after 2014.

Udta Punjab led the ceremony with 9 nominations, followed by Ae Dil Hai Mushkil and M.S. Dhoni: The Untold Story with 8 nominations each, Pink with 7 nominations and Neerja with 5 nominations.

Ae Dil Hai Mushkil won 7 awards, including Best Music Director (for Pritam), Best Lyricist (for Amitabh Bhattacharya – "Channa Mereya") and Best Male Playback Singer (for Amit Mishra – "Bulleya"), thus becoming the most-awarded film at the ceremony.

Alia Bhatt received dual nominations for Best Actress for her performances in Dear Zindagi and Udta Punjab, winning for the latter.

== Winners and Nominees ==
Winners are listed first and highlighted in boldface.

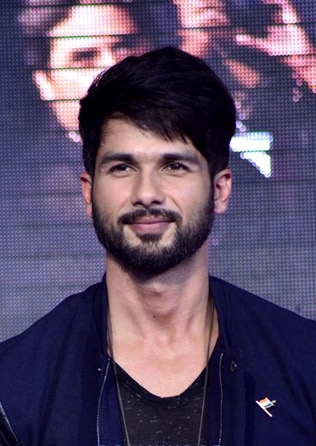
Shahid Kapoor — Best Actor winner

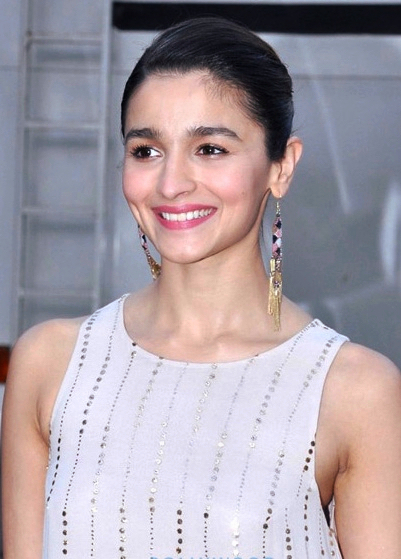
Alia Bhatt — Best Actress winner

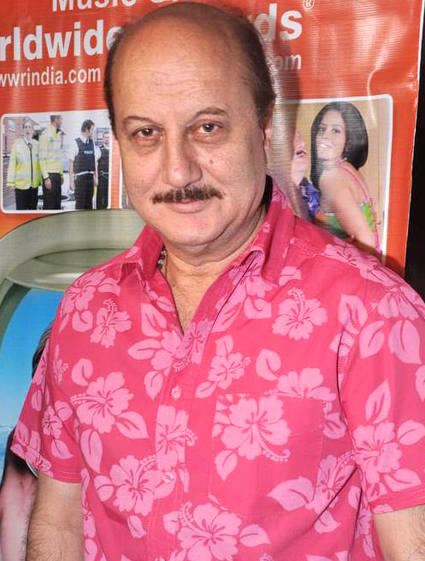
Anupam Kher — Best Supporting Actor winner

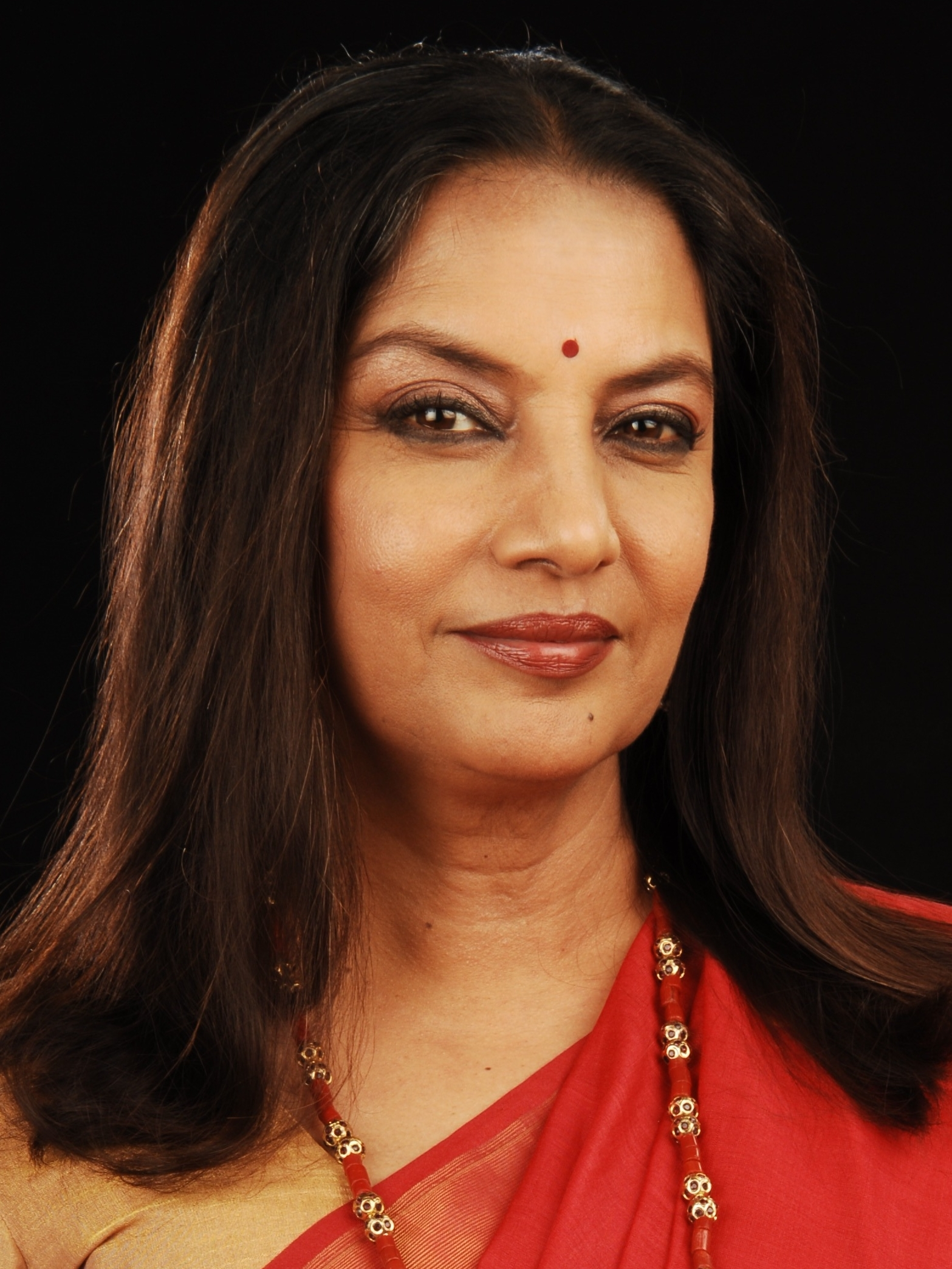
Shabana Azmi — Best Supporting Actress winner

`

Best Film	Best Director
**Neerja**; Ae Dil Hai Mushkil; M.S. Dhoni: The Untold Story; Pink; Sultan; Udta Punjab	**Aniruddha Roy Chowdhury – Pink**; Abhishek Chaubey – Udta Punjab; Ali Abbas Zafar – Sultan; Karan Johar – Ae Dil Hai Mushkil; Neeraj Pandey – M.S. Dhoni: The Untold Story; Ram Madhvani – Neerja
Best Actor In A Leading Role	Best Actress In A Leading Role
**Shahid Kapoor – Udta Punjab**; Amitabh Bachchan – Pink; Ranbir Kapoor – Ae Dil Hai Mushkil; Salman Khan – Sultan; Shah Rukh Khan – Fan; Sushant Singh Rajput – M.S. Dhoni: The Untold Story	**Alia Bhatt – Udta Punjab**; Alia Bhatt – Dear Zindagi; Anushka Sharma – Ae Dil Hai Mushkil; Sonam Kapoor – Neerja; Taapsee Pannu – Pink
Best Actor In A Supporting Role	Best Actress In A Supporting Role
**Anupam Kher – M.S. Dhoni: The Untold Story**; Amitabh Bachchan – Wazir; Rajkummar Rao – Aligarh; Rajat Kapoor – Kapoor & Sons; Rishi Kapoor – Kapoor & Sons	**Shabana Azmi – Neerja**; Andrea Tariang – Pink as Andrea Tariang; Disha Patani – M.S. Dhoni: The Untold Story; Kirti Kulhari – Pink as Falak Ali; Ratna Pathak Shah – Kapoor & Sons; Richa Chadda – Sarbjit
Best Performance in a Comic Role	Best Performance in a Negative Role
**Varun Dhawan – Dishoom**; Jimmy Shergill – Happy Bhag Jayegi; Rishi Kapoor – Kapoor & Sons; Shahid Kapoor – Udta Punjab	**Jim Sarbh – Neerja**; Akshaye Khanna – Dishoom; Neil Nitin Mukesh – Wazir; Shah Rukh Khan – Fan
Best Debut Actor	Best Debut Actress
**Diljit Dosanjh – Udta Punjab**; Rohit Suresh Saraf – Dear Zindagi	**Disha Patani – M.S. Dhoni: The Untold Story**; Sayyesha – Shivaay

=== Musical awards ===
Best Music Direction	Best Lyrics
**Ae Dil Hai Mushkil – Pritam Chakraborty**; M.S. Dhoni: The Untold Story – Amaal Mallik; Udta Punjab – Amit Trivedi	**Amitabh Bhattacharya – "Channa Mereya" – Ae Dil Hai Mushkil**; Gulzar – "Aave Re Hitchki" – Mirzya; Tanveer Ghazi – "Tu Chal" – Pink
Best Male Playback Singer	Best Female Playback Singer
**Amit Mishra – "Bulleya" – Ae Dil Hai Mushkil**; Armaan Malik – "Besabriyaan" – M.S. Dhoni: The Untold Story; Arijit Singh – "Channa Mereya" – Ae Dil Hai Mushkil; Diljit Dosanjh – "Ikk Kudi" – Udta Punjab	**Tulsi Kumar – "Soch Na Sake" – Airlift &** **Kanika Kapoor – "Da Da Dasse" – Udta Punjab (tie)**; Neha Bhasin – "Jag Ghoomeya" – Sultan
Best Sound Design	Best Background Score
**Pranav Shukla** – **Mirzya**	**Pritam** – **Ae Dil Hai Mushkil**

=== Technical awards ===
Best Action	Best Special Effects
**Larnell Stovall, Parvez Shaikh, `ANL` Arasu** – **Sultan**	**Red Chillies VFX** – **Fan**
Best Choreography	Best Cinematography
**Adil Shaikh** – **Kapoor & Sons**	**Anil Mehta, ISC & WICA** – **Ae Dil Hai Mushkil**
Best Costume Design	Best Dialogue
**Manish Malhotra** – **Ae Dil Hai Mushkil**	**Ritesh Shah** – **Pink**
Best Editing	Best Makeup
**Bodhaditya Bandyopadhyay** – **Pink**	**Greg Cannom** – **Fan**
Best Production Design	Best Screenplay
**Aparna Sud & Anna Ipe** – **Neerja**	**Ritesh Shah** – **Pink**
Best Sound Mixing	Best Sound Recording
**Anuj Mathur** – **Sultan**	**Shadab Rayeen** – **Ae Dil Hai Mushkil**
Best Story
**Ayesha Devitre, Shakun Batra** – **Kapoor & Sons**

=== Special awards ===
Woman of the Year	Style Icon
**Taapsee Pannu**	**Alia Bhatt**

== Superlatives ==
Films with multiple nominations
Nominations	Film
9	Udta Punjab
8	Ae Dil Hai Mushkil
8	M.S. Dhoni: The Untold Story
7	Pink
5	Neerja
4	Kapoor & Sons
4	Sultan
2	Dear Zindagi
2	Dishoom
2	Fan
2	Wazir

Films with multiple awards
Awards	Film
7	Ae Dil Hai Mushkil
4	Neerja
4	Pink
4	Udta Punjab
2	Fan
2	Kapoor & Sons
2	M.S. Dhoni: The Untold Story
2	Sultan
