= Mirchi Music Award for Music Composer of The Year =

Indian film music award

The Mirchi Music Award for Music Composer of The Year is given yearly by Radio Mirchi as a part of its annual Mirchi Music Awards for Hindi films, to recognise a music director who has delivered an outstanding performance in a film song.

== Superlatives ==
Superlative	Singer	Record
Most awards	Pritam	4
Most nominations	Pritam	14
Most nominations in a single year	Pritam; A.R Rahman; Sanjay Leela Bhansali	3 (2012,2016); 3 (2009,2021); 3(2018)

== List of winners ==
- 2008 A.R Rahman - "Kabhi Kabhi Aditi" from Jaane Tu... Ya Jaane Na
  - Vishal–Shekhar - "Jaane Kyun" from Dostana
  - A.R Rahman - "Kaise Mujhe" from Ghajini
  - Pritam - "Teri Ore" from Singh Is Kinng
  - Shankar–Ehsaan–Loy - "Ye Tumhari Meri Baatein" from Rock On!!
- 2009 A.R Rahman - "Masakali" from Delhi-6
  - Shankar–Ehsaan–Loy - "Sapnon Se Bhare Naina" from Luck By Chance
  - A.R Rahman - "Rehna Tu" from Delhi-6
  - Pritam - "Tera Hone Laga Hoon" from Ajab Prem Ki Ghazab Kahani
  - A.R Rahman - "Jai Ho" from Slumdog Millionaire
- 2010 Sajid–Wajid - "Tere Mast Mast Do Nain" from Dabangg
  - Shankar–Ehsaan–Loy - "Sajdaa" from My Name is Khan
  - Lalit Pandit - "Munni Badnaam Hui" from Dabangg
  - Pritam - "Pee Loon" from Once Upon A Time In Mumbaai
  - Vishal Bhardwaj - "Dil To Bachcha Hai" from Ishqiya
- 2011 A.R Rahman - "Nadaan Parindey" from Rockstar
  - Vishal–Shekhar - "Ooh La La" from The Dirty Picture
  - A.R Rahman - "Sadda Haq" from Rockstar
  - Shankar–Ehsaan–Loy - "Senorita" from Zindagi Na Milegi Dobara
  - Himesh Reshammiya - "Teri Meri" from Bodyguard
- 2012 Ajay–Atul - "Abhi Mujh Mein Kahin" from Agneepath
  - Ajay–Atul - "Chikni Chameli" from Agneepath
  - Pritam - "Ala Barfi" from Barfi!
  - Pritam - "Phir Le Aya Dil" from Barfi!
  - Pritam - "Tum Hi Ho Bandhu" from Cocktail
- 2013 Mithoon - "Tum Hi Ho" from Aashiqui 2
  - Pritam - "Badtameez Dil" from Yeh Jawaani Hai Deewani
  - Shankar–Ehsaan–Loy - "Zinda" from Bhaag Milkha Bhaag
  - Shankar–Ehsaan–Loy - "O Rangrez" from Bhaag Milkha Bhaag
  - Ankit Tiwari - "Sunn Raha Hai" from Aashiqui 2
- 2014 Shankar–Ehsaan–Loy - "Mast Magan" from 2 States
  - Vishal–Shekhar - "Manwa Laage" from Happy New Year
  - Vishal Bhardwaj - "Bismil" from Haider
  - Ankit Tiwari - "Galliyan" from Ek Villain
  - Jeet Gannguli - "Muskurane" from CityLights
- 2015 Pritam - "Gerua" from Dilwale
  - Amaal Mallik - "Sooraj Dooba Hain" from Roy
  - Sanjay Leela Bhansali - "Aayat" from Bajirao Mastani
  - Sanjay Leela Bhansali - "Deewani Mastani" from Bajirao Mastani
  - Sachin–Jigar - "Chunar" from ABCD 2
- 2016 Pritam - "Ae Dil Hai Mushkil" from Ae Dil Hai Mushkil
  - Pritam - "Channa Mereya" from Ae Dil Hai Mushkil
  - Pritam - "Bulleya" from Ae Dil Hai Mushkil
  - Vishal–Shekhar - "Jag Ghoomeya" from Sultan
  - Amit Trivedi - "Ikk Kudi" from Udta Punjab
- 2017 Pritam - "Hawayein" from Jab Harry Met Sejal
  - Sachin–Jigar - "Manaa Ki Hum Yaar Nehi" from Meri Pyaari Bindu
  - Sachin–Jigar - "Hoor" from Hindi Medium
  - Mithoon - "Phir Bhi Tumko Chaahunga" from Half Girlfriend
  - Tanishk Bagchi - "Baarish" from Half Girlfriend
  - Amaal Mallik - "Aashiq Surrender Hua" from Badrinath Ki Dulhania
- 2018 Sanjay Leela Bhansali - "Ek Dil Ek Jaan" from Padmaavat
  - Sanjay Leela Bhansali - "Khalibali" from Padmaavat
  - Ajay–Atul - "Dhadak" from Dhadak
  - Sanjay Leela Bhansali - "Binte Dil" from Padmaavat
  - Amit Trivedi - "Aaj Se Teri" from Pad Man
- 2019 Pritam - "Kalank" from Kalank
  - Sachet–Parampara - "Bekhayali" from Kabir Singh
  - Mithoon - "Tujhe Kitna Chahne Lage" from Kabir Singh
  - Pritam - "Ghar More Pardesiya" from Kalank
  - Shashwat Sachdev - "Beh Chala" from Uri: The Surgical Strike
- 2020 Ajay-Atul (Music Composer of the Decade) - "Abhi Mujh Mein Kahin" from Agneepath
- 2021 Tanishk Bagchi - "Rataan Lambiyaan" from Shershaah
  - AR Rahman - "Chaka Chak" from Atrangi Re
  - AR Rahman - "Rait Zara Si" from Atrangi Re
  - AR Rahman - "Tere Rang" from Atrangi Re
  - Jasleen Royal - "Ranjha" from Shershaah
- 2022 Sanjay Leela Bhansali - "Jab Saiyaan" from Gangubai Kathiawadi
  - Pritam - "Kesariya" from Brahmāstra: Part One – Shiva
  - Pritam - "Deva Deva" from Brahmāstra: Part One – Shiva
  - Amit Trivedi - "Ghodey Pe Sawar" from Qala
  - Amit Trivedi - "Shauq" from Qala
- 2024 Vishal–Shekhar - "Besharam Rang" from Pathaan

== See also ==
- Mirchi Music Awards
- Bollywood
- Cinema of India
