= Ae Dil Hai Mushkil (soundtrack) =

- Standard Edition Cover

Soundtrack album by Pritam
- Released: 7 October 2016 (Standard); 11 November 2016 (Deluxe)
- Recorded: 2015–2016
- Studio: New Edge Studios, Mumbai
- Genre: Feature film soundtrack
- Length: 27:54
- Languages: Hindi; Urdu
- Label: Sony Music India
- Producer: Karan Johar

Pritam chronology
Dishoom (2016)	Ae Dil Hai Mushkil (2016)	Dangal (2016)
External audio
- Audio Jukebox on YouTube

Singles from Ae Dil Hai Mushkil
- 1. "Ae Dil Hai Mushkil" Released: 31 August 2016; 2. "Bulleya" Released: 5 September 2016; 3. "Channa Mereya" Released: 14 September 2016

Ae Dil Hai Mushkil (transl. O heart, it is difficult) is the soundtrack album composed by Pritam, with lyrics written by Amitabh Bhattacharya for the 2016 Hindi romance film of the same name written and directed by Karan Johar. The soundtrack marks Pritam's maiden collaboration with Johar as director, despite having previously composed for his company Dharma Productions' Yeh Jawaani Hai Deewani. It is based on the film's theme on unrequited love, consisting situational numbers portraying the emotions of characters Ayan (Ranbir Kapoor), Saba (Aishwarya Rai), Alizeh (Anushka Sharma) and Ali (Fawad Khan).

Given the intensity of the screenplay, Pritam composed a mix of romantic, intense and fun songs unlike routine romantic numbers. The title track, which served the first single from the soundtrack was instantaneously composed with predictable rhymes. As per trends by Google, the track was the topmost Hindi song in India during 2016–17. The tracks "Bulleya" and "Channa Mereya" served as second and third singles both were successful at the Radio Mirchi music charts and set new streaming records on digital music platforms in India. "Bulleya" incorporates the Sufi genre whereas the "Channa Mereya" is a fusion folk track. The standard edition of the soundtrack consists of six original songs and was released by Sony Music India. Owing to the positive critical reception of music in the film and audience response, the deluxe edition was released with three additional tracks, reprise and unplugged versions of "Bulleya" and "Channa Mereya" respectively and a dubstep remix of the track "Aaj Jaane Ki Zid Na Karo". Instrumental versions of the standard edition of the soundtrack were also released. Additionally, the song "An Evening in Paris" was released as a bonus single by Saregama.

The music of the film was nominated for several awards, including Filmfare Awards where Pritam won the Best Music Director Award, Bhattacharya and Arijit Singh won the Best Lyricist ("Channa Mereya") and Best Playback Singer (Male) titles. Amit Mishra was awarded the R. D. Burman Award for New Music Talent by Filmfare for the track "Bulleya".

== Background ==
On 1 December 2014, Dharma Productions made an announcement related to the film's music, which was to be composed by Pritam. Pritam acknowledged his experience working with Johar as easiest and instinctive because the latter would approve or reject tunes on spot. Also, he called the soundtrack as "grand" and "romantic". As per him, the film was about unrequited love, so the songs depended upon the situations and characters. He avoided pure romantic melodies as the film was intense on emotions.

Lyricist Amitabh Bhattacharya penned lyrics of the tunes keeping in mind the flavour of the film. Johar narrated the script and gave situations of the songs which was a standard procedure they followed. The track "Channa Mereya", "Bulleya" and the title track were the first ones to get approved by 2015. The track "Cutiepie" was recorded later.

In an interview early September 2016, Pritam announced the soundtrack album release by end of September 2016, with seven tracks. The standalone numbers were mentioned as a mixed bag of intense, romantic songs and fun songs.

== Production ==
While recording the title track, Pritam recalled that he was a little tensed before the song was released, though he was complimented by Johar, Aditya Chopra and Shah Rukh Khan who heard it. While in Panchgani, he played the song on guitar during the process of being created. While appearing on The Kapil Sharma Show, lyricist Amitabh Bhattacharya revealed that the title track was composed in the backseat of a car. He recalled the meeting schedule with Johar. Since morning, Bhattacharya was in touch with Pritam who was designing the tune. While they both sat in the car and drove from Oshiwara to Khar, the former penned the lyrics. The song was written in the shortest time possible time. By the time the duo reached office, they had written the entire song. Bhattacharya, in his interview with Livemint stated that he was not happy when he first wrote the Ae Dil Hai Mushkil title track. He thought it was predictable, as there were lines with words "shaamil" rhymed with a "kaabil" followed by a "manzil". However, upon its positive reception, he noted that "a little bit of predictability also works".

An optional track to the title track was recorded. This track was titled "Tu Jo Mila" but was later used for the soundtrack of film Bajrangi Bhaijaan. Pritam initially wrote the lines "Kyunki Tu Dhadkan, Main Dil" as 'Kyunki Ae Dil Hai Mushkil', but its removal led Kausar Munir to tweak the line for the 2015 film. On the picturisation of the title track, he added that Kapoor has not sung any song for the film, but the entire first stanza of the song held focus on his eyes. Kapoor is singing and the entire expression, the mood of the song is reflected through his eyes.

In an interview with The Times of India, Shilpa Rao said that the song "Bulleya" was new for her in terms of vocal, styling, tone, and texture. She recorded the song almost a year and a half before the film was released. The lyrics were totally different then. In an interview with The Indian Express, Rao mentioned she was surprised to be labelled as the voice of Aishwarya Rai Bachchan. She called the song "not an easy one", "seamless" and did take some time to get into it. While recording, it was difficult for her to keep that composure and flow. The song was composed in Sufi genre. Upon its release, the key riff in the song was noted reminiscent of Papa Roach's 2000 single Last Resort.

For the track, "The Breakup Song", Bhattacharya wanted middle class choice of words, where he used the words "Baasi" (Stale) and Jeevit (Alive) in the lines "Jeevit hua hai phir se cupid tera, Baasi relationship ka label hata" which were unlikely words for a break up song, set in a silent disco in London. He was quoted saying: "I try to insert these words whenever I get the chance," he says. He felt that some of these obvious, everyday Hindi words were on the verge of extinction—that what passes for Hindi in today's conversational lingo was actually more of Urdu and less of unadulterated Hindi." The track "Alizeh" has a church music setting especially, the use of choir with rap portions by Shashwat Singh.

== Reception ==
=== Critical response ===
Critic based at The Times of India gave the soundtrack album 4 out of 5 stars, adding: "'ADHM's soundtrack is in sync with the film's theme and genre and has some memorable numbers that will continue to stay in the minds of listeners in the years to come." Joginder Tuteja of Bollywood Hungama wrote: "The music of Ae Dil Hai Mushkil is very good and is totally in lines with the expectations that you have from a film belonging to the romantic drama genre, as well as the cast that it features. Most of the songs do well instantly and majority would go on to have a long run even after the film is off the screens." Surabhi Redkar of Koimoi gave a track-by-track review, assigned 4 out of 5 stars stated: "Pritam gives us one of 2016's best albums with Ae Dil Hai Mushkil. The confluence of good music, lyrics and vocals makes this soundtrack easily likable." Megha Mathur of The Quint mentioned: "ADHM Brings Together The Best Of Sufi and Quirky. It's experimental, fresh and uplifting. Pritam's been criticised in the past for being unoriginal, but every single track in here will get you humming and dancing." Nandini Ramesh of Scroll Magazine, noted: "The songs are woven more dextrously into the narrative, and the overall tone is more sombre and, in fleeting moments, even despairing." Lisa Tsering from The Hollywood Reporter stated: "Composer Pritam puts raw emotion into the film's songs, aided by vocalists Arijit Singh and Amit Mishra, though the filmmakers made an unfortunate decision not to subtitle them." Rahul Desai of Film Companion magazine wrote: "music [is] used as an allegory; love is poetic and passionate Urdu, and friendship is contemporary fast-food Hindi."

Sankhayan Ghosh of Livemint, however, stated: "This Pritam-Amitabh Bhattacharya album for the big Karan Johar film is mostly solid, that falls short of being great. Pritam's inability to completely break away from overused templates is what stops his albums from being consistently good."

=== Chart performances ===
Following the release of the title track from the soundtrack album, it gained over a million streams within 48 hours on music streaming platform Saavn. It is the fastest track to reach a million, hitting 3.5 million in a week in 2016. The song "Channa Mereya" was in the streaming platform's top songs of all-time list. It peaked at #1 on the Radio Mirchi Top 20 Countdown chart, and stayed on the chart for 5 months. At the year end it was at the 9th position on Radio Mirchi Top 100 Countdown chart. The title track peaked at #1 on the Radio Mirchi Top 20 Countdown chart, and stayed on the chart for more than 4 months, and at the year end it was at the 5th position on Radio Mirchi Top 100 Countdown chart.

On the Billboard Charts, the title track peaked on #17 and continued to stay 6 weeks post release.

Weekly charts

Chart (2016–17)	Song	Peak position	Reference(s)
Mirchi Top 20	"Ae Dil Hai Mushkil"	1	
Mirchi Top 20	"Channa Mereya"	1	

Year-end charts

Chart (2016)	Song	Position	Reference(s)
Mirchi Top 100	"Ae Dil Hai Mushkil"	5	
Mirchi Top 100	"Channa Mereya"	9	
Mirchi Top 100	"The Breakup Song"	22	
Mirchi Top 100	"Bulleya"	32	

== Track listing ==
The soundtrack album was released into three parts - one the standard edition which features six original songs. They were released digitally on 7 October 2016. Later, the soundtrack album was bundled into deluxe edition with three more tracks which were initially recorded for film score, and was released after the film's release on 11 November 2016.

All lyrics are written by Amitabh Bhattacharya; all music is composed by Pritam.

Standard Edition
No.	Title	Singer(s)	Length
1.	"Ae Dil Hai Mushkil"	Arijit Singh	4:29
2.	"Bulleya"	Amit Mishra, Shilpa Rao	5:49
3.	"Channa Mereya"	Arijit Singh	4:49
4.	"The Breakup Song"	Arijit Singh, Jonita Gandhi, Badshah, Nakash Aziz	4:12
5.	"Cutipie"	Pardeep Singh Sran, Nakash Aziz	3:51
6.	"Alizeh"	Arijit Singh, Ash King, Shashwat Singh	4:42
Total length:			27:54

Deluxe edition
No.	Title	Artist(s)	Length
7.	"Bulleya" (Reprise)	Arijit Singh, Shilpa Rao	5:48
8.	"Channa Mereya" (Unplugged)	Arijit Singh	2:47
9.	"Aaj Jaane Ki Zid Na Karo"	Shilpa Rao	2:45
10.	"Ae Dil Hai Mushkil (Reprise)"	Jubin Nautiyal	4:29
Total length:			43:42

All tracks are written by Pritam, Ajay Singha.

Instrumental
No.	Title	Length
1.	"Ae Dil Hai Mushkil (Instrumental)"	4:30
2.	"Bulleya (Instrumental)"	5:49
3.	"Channa Mereya (Instrumental)"	4:49
4.	"The Breakup Song (Instrumental)"	4:02
5.	"Cutipie (Instrumental)"	3:50
6.	"Alizeh (Instrumental)"	4:43
Total length:		27:51

"An Evening in Paris" track was deleted from the original film footage, however, was released as a bonus single by Saregama on 7 November 2016.

Bonus single
No.	Title	Writer(s)	Singer	Length
1.	"An Evening in Paris"	Shankar–Jaikishan	Mohammed Rafi	5:16

== Release history ==
Region	Date	Format(s)	Version	Label	Ref.
Various	7 October 2016	Digital download; streaming	Standard	Sony Music India	
Various	7 November 2016	CD	Standard	Sony Music India	
Various	11 November 2016	Digital download; streaming; CD	Deluxe	Sony Music India	
Various	31 March 2017	Vinyl	Standard	Sony Music India	

== Accolades ==
Award	Date of Ceremony	Category	Recipient(s) and nominee(s)	Result	Ref(s)
Filmfare Awards	14 January 2017	Best Music Director	Pritam	Won	
Filmfare Awards	14 January 2017	Best Lyricist	Amitabh Bhattacharya for "Channa Mereya"	Won	
Filmfare Awards	14 January 2017	Best Playback Singer – Male	Arijit Singh for "Ae Dil Hai Mushkil"	Won	
Filmfare Awards	14 January 2017	RD Burman Award for New Music Talent	Amit Mishra for "Bulleya"	Won	
Filmfare Awards	14 January 2017	Best Playback Singer – Female	Jonita Gandhi for "The Breakup Song"	Nominated	
Screen Awards	4 December 2016	Best Music Director	Pritam	Won	
Screen Awards	4 December 2016	Best Male Playback	Amit Mishra for "Bulleya"	Won	
Screen Awards	4 December 2016	Best Lyricist	Amitabh Bhattacharya for "Ae Dil Hai Mushkil"	Won	
Stardust Awards	20 December 2016	Best Music Album	Sony Music India	Won	
Stardust Awards	20 December 2016	Best Music Director	Pritam	Won	
Stardust Awards	20 December 2016	Best Lyricist	Amitabh Bhattacharya for "Channa Mereya"	Won	
Stardust Awards	20 December 2016	Best Lyricist	Amitabh Bhattacharya for "Ae Dil Hai Mushkil"	Nominated	
Stardust Awards	20 December 2016	Best Playback Singer (Male)	Arijit Singh for "Channa Mereya"	Won	
Stardust Awards	20 December 2016	Best Playback Singer (Male)	Arijit Singh for "Ae Dil Hai Mushkil"	Nominated	
Stardust Awards	20 December 2016	Best Playback Singer (Female)	Jonita Gandhi for "The Breakup Song"	Nominated	
Mirchi Music Awards	18 February 2017	Song of the Year	"Ae Dil Hai Mushkil (song)"	Nominated	
Mirchi Music Awards	18 February 2017	Song of the Year	"Bulleya"	Nominated	
Mirchi Music Awards	18 February 2017	Song of the Year	"Channa Mereya"	Won	
Mirchi Music Awards	18 February 2017	Song of the Year	"Channa Mereya (Unplugged)"	Nominated	
Mirchi Music Awards	18 February 2017	Album of the Year	Pritam and Amitabh Bhattacharya	Won	
Mirchi Music Awards	18 February 2017	Male Vocalist of the Year	Amit Mishra for "Bulleya"	Nominated	
Mirchi Music Awards	18 February 2017	Male Vocalist of the Year	Arijit Singh for "Ae Dil Hai Mushkil"	Won	
Mirchi Music Awards	18 February 2017	Male Vocalist of the Year	Arijit Singh for "Channa Mereya"	Nominated	
Mirchi Music Awards	18 February 2017	Female Vocalist of the Year	Jonita Gandhi for ""The Breakup Song""	Nominated	
Mirchi Music Awards	18 February 2017	Female Vocalist of the Year	Shilpa Rao for "Bulleya"	Nominated	
Mirchi Music Awards	18 February 2017	Music Composer of the Year	Pritam for "Ae Dil Hai Mushkil"	Won	
Mirchi Music Awards	18 February 2017	Music Composer of the Year	Pritam for "Bulleya"	Nominated	
Mirchi Music Awards	18 February 2017	Music Composer of the Year	Pritam for "Channa Mereya"	Nominated	
Mirchi Music Awards	18 February 2017	Lyricist of the Year	Amitabh Bhattacharya for "Ae Dil Hai Mushkil"	Nominated	
Mirchi Music Awards	18 February 2017	Lyricist of the Year	Amitabh Bhattacharya for "Bulleya"	Nominated	
Mirchi Music Awards	18 February 2017	Lyricist of the Year	Amitabh Bhattacharya for "Channa Mereya"	Won	
Mirchi Music Awards	18 February 2017	Best Song Engineer (Recording & Mixing)	Shadab Rayeen, Sunny M.R. & Ashwin Kulkarni for "Bulleya"	Nominated	
Mirchi Music Awards	18 February 2017	Best Background Score	Pritam	Nominated	
Mirchi Music Awards	11 March 2021	Lyricist of the Decade	Amitabh Bhattacharya for "Channa Mereya"	Won	

== Personnel ==
Credits adapted from the CD liner notes and end credits footage.

- Sunny M. R. - music production, music programming (track 1, 2, 3, 4, 5), sound design, songs premixing, mixing and mastering
- Shadab Rayeen - mixing and mastering
- Shubhadeep Mitra - songs premixing
- Ashwin Kulkarni - songs premixing
- Kaos - remix (track 9)
- Prasad Sashte - music programming (track 1)
- Arijit Singh - music programming (track 3, 4)
- Rohan Chauhan - music programming (track 4,5)
- Hyacinth Dsouza - music programming (track 4, 5)
- Qaran Mehta - music programming (track 4)
- Bharat - music programming (track 5)
- Tanuj Tiku - music programming (track 6)
- Arjun Chandy - backing vocals
- Nikhil Paul George - backing vocals (track 6), strings, horns and gospel dub
- Meenal Jain - backing vocals (track 5)
- Antara - backing vocals (track 5)
- Neetu Bhalla - backing vocals
- Geet - backing vocals
- Akashdeep - backing vocals
- Keshia Braganza - backing vocals
- N. K. Deep Kaur - backing vocals
- Ashwin - backing vocals
- Gwen Diaz - backing vocals
- Bhabita - backing vocals
- Himanshu - backing vocals
- Pete Whitefield - Strings, horns and gospel dub
- Julian Kershaw - Strings, horns and gospel dub
