= Bolna (song) =

2016 Hindi song

Song by Arijit Singh, Asees Kaur

from the album Kapoor & Sons
- Language: Hindi, Punjabi
- Released: 24 February 2016
- Genre: Popular music
- Length: 3:33
- Label: Sony Music India
- Composer(s): Tanishk Bagchi
- Lyricist(s): Dr. Devender Kafir

Music video
- "Bolna" on YouTube

Bolna (transl. Please say) is a Hindi song sung by Arijit Singh and Asees Kaur. The music is composed by Tanishk Bagchi for the soundtrack of the film Kapoor & Sons and the lyrics are penned by Dr. Devender Kafir.

Upon its release the song created stir on the digital platform and was described as "the love song of 2016 Spring season". Tanishk Bagchi and Asees Kaur won 2017 Mirchi Music Awards for Upcoming Music Composer of The Year and Upcoming Female Vocalist of The Year respectively.

== Accolades ==
Year	Award Ceremony	Category	Recipient	Result	Reference(s)
2016	Mirchi Music Awards	Male Vocalist of the Year	Arijit Singh	Nominated	
2016	Mirchi Music Awards	Upcoming Female Vocalist of the Year	Asees Kaur	Won	
2016	Mirchi Music Awards	Upcoming Music Composer of the Year	Tanishk Bagchi	Won	
