= Jag Ghoomeya =

Song from 2016 Indian film "Sultan"

Song by Rahat Fateh Ali Khan, Salman Khan, Neha Bhasin

from the album Sultan
- Language: Punjabi
- Length: 4:41 (Film version); 4:14 (Neha Bhasin version); 4:49 (Salman Khan version)
- Label: YRF Music
- Composer: Vishal–Shekhar
- Lyricist: Irshad Kamil

"Jag Ghoomeya" (transl. Toured the world) is a Punjabi song from the soundtrack of 2016 Indian film Sultan. The song is written by Irshad Kamil, composed by Vishal–Shekhar and sung by Rahat Fateh Ali Khan. It is picturised upon Salman Khan and Anushka Sharma for the film. The song also has an audio version by Salman Khan, and a female version by Neha Bhasin picturised upon Anushka Sharma.

== Critical reception ==
"Filmbeat" described the song as melodic.

"Pinkvilla" wrote the song Jag Ghoomeya is mesmerising.

== Awards ==
Neha Bhasin was awarded the "Best female singer award" at the Filmfare Awards 2017.

Year	Award Ceremony	Category	Recipient	Result	Reference(s)
2016	Mirchi Music Awards	Song of the Year	-	Nominated	
2016	Mirchi Music Awards	Male Vocalist of the Year	Rahat Fateh Ali Khan	Nominated	
2016	Mirchi Music Awards	Female Vocalist of the Year	Neha Bhasin	Nominated	
2016	Mirchi Music Awards	Music Composer of the Year	Vishal–Shekhar	Nominated	
2016	Mirchi Music Awards	Lyricist of the Year	Irshad Kamil	Nominated	
2016	Mirchi Music Awards	Raag-Inspired Song of the Year	-	Nominated	
