= Sultan (2016 film) =

2016 Indian film by Ali Abbas Zafar

- Theatrical release poster
- Directed by: Ali Abbas Zafar
- Written by: Ali Abbas Zafar
- Produced by: Aditya Chopra
- Starring: Salman Khan; Anushka Sharma; Randeep Hooda; Amit Sadh
- Cinematography: Artur Zurawski
- Edited by: Rameshwar S. Bhagat
- Music by: Score: Julius Packiam; Songs: Vishal–Shekhar
- Production company: Yash Raj Films
- Distributed by: Yash Raj Films
- Release date: 6 July 2016
- Running time: 170 minutes
- Country: India
- Language: Hindi
- Budget: ₹90 crore
- Box office: est. ₹623.33 crore

Sultan is a 2016 Indian Hindi-language sports drama film written and directed by Ali Abbas Zafar and produced by Aditya Chopra under Yash Raj Films. The film stars Salman Khan in the titular role and Anushka Sharma, Amit Sadh, and Randeep Hooda. It narrates the story of Sultan Ali Khan, a fictional pehlwani wrestler and former world wrestling champion from Haryana whose successful career has created a rift in his personal life.

Principal photography began in October 2015. The film's soundtrack is composed by Vishal-Shekhar with Julius Packiam providing the score. It was released worldwide on 6 July 2016, coinciding with Eid. The film received positive reviews from critics, who praised Khan's performance and Zafar's direction. Made on a budget of ₹90 crore ($13 million), it grossed ₹623.33 crore ($93 million) worldwide, becoming the tenth highest-grossing Hindi film of all-time.

== Plot ==
Sultan Ali Khan, a middle-aged former wrestling champion, lives a lonely life in the town of Rewari, Haryana. Aakash Oberoi, the founder of Pro Takedown, a private mixed martial arts league, funded by Mr. Patel, is encouraged by his father to recruit Sultan to salvage league's popularity. After travelling to Haryana, he offers to recruit Sultan, who bluntly refuses because of his retirement from wrestling. Aakash asks Sultan's close friend Govind, who narrates how Sultan's career begun.

Sultan fell in love with Aarfa Hussain, a state-level wrestler and daughter of a local wrestling coach. She initially dislikes him, but later accepts him as a friend. When he confesses his love to her, she insults him, and tells him that she would only marry a well-trained wrestler. Determined to win her respect, Sultan dedicates himself to intense training and ultimately wins a state-level wrestling tournament, and Aarfa. They eventually get married and become famous wrestlers, representing India in various international games.

When they are both selected to compete at the Olympics, Aarfa discovers that she's pregnant. She gives up her childhood dream of winning a gold medal for India, which Sultan fulfills. To her surprise, Sultan's fame causes him to be arrogant, and he slaps a reporter at an event. He also leaves Aarfa, who is nearing her due date, to win a gold medal in Turkey. Upon his return, he learns that his newborn son had died due to severe anaemia. His son had a rare O-blood type, identical to Sultan's, depriving the child of a donor. Angered, Aarfa leaves Sultan to live with her father. Devastated, Sultan decides to raise funds to open a blood bank in his son's name.

In the present, Aakash promises Sultan that the tournament's prize money will go towards fulfilling his dream of opening a blood bank. Sultan agrees to participate and travels to Delhi, where Aakash introduces him to coach Fateh Singh, who initially refuses to train him but agrees after seeing his determination. After 2 months of intense training, Sultan is able to regain his physique and learns freestyle wrestling. In his first fight, Sultan defeats the opponent using capoeira. He soon becomes a nationwide sensation after winning a series of matches and gains Aarfa's support in the process.

In the semi-final round, Sultan wins the fight but is severely injured and is hospitalised. The doctor informs Aakash that if Sultan continues fighting, his injuries would become fatal. Aarfa arrives at the hospital and motivates him to continue fighting. In the final round, Sultan overcomes his pain to defeat his opponent and ultimately wins the tournament. Reunited with his wife, Sultan opens a blood bank using the prize money, and Aarfa resumes wrestling. A few years later, she gives birth to a baby girl, whom Sultan begins to train as a wrestler.

== Cast ==
- Salman Khan as Sultan Ali Khan
- Anushka Sharma as Aarfa Ali Khan, Sultan's wife
- Randeep Hooda as Fateh Singh, Sultan's coach and a former MMA champion
- Amit Sadh as Aakash Oberoi, Founder of Pro Takedown and Sultan's presenter
- Kumud Mishra as Barkat Hussain, Aarfa's father
- Anant Vidhaat Sharma as Govind, Sultan's friend
- Parikshit Sahni as Gyan Singh Oberoi, Aakash's father
- Ivan Sylvester Rodrigues as Mr. Patel (Aakash's senior)
- Tyron Woodley as Himself (Pro Takedown Fighter)
- Marko Zaror as Himself (Pro Takedown Fighter)
- Marrese Crump as Himself (Pro Takedown Fighter)
- Ron Smoorenburg as Himself (Pro Takedown Fighter)
- Sumeet Samnaj as Tiny Kukreja, Sultan's sponsor
- Suzie Khan as Sultan and Aarfa's daughter
- Shammi Narang as Wrestling Commentator
- Karmveer Choudhary as Haryana Government Sports Officer
- Meiyang Chang as Himself (Commentator)
- Kubbra Sait as Herself (Commentator)
- Shibani Dandekar as Herself (Pro Takedown Host)
- Anjana Om Kashyap as Herself (News Anchor)
- Durgesh Kumar as Himself (Commentator)

== Production ==
=== Development ===
The project was earlier announced in June 2015 with a teaser released on YouTube. Khan will be seen portraying a Haryana-based wrestler in the film. To prepare for the film, Khan underwent wrestling training under the guidance of Larnell Stovall.

=== Casting ===
In October 2015, there were reports of American actor Sylvester Stallone being cast in the film as Khan's on-screen coach. However, Raja Mukerji, the Executive Producer of the film cleared that Stallone would not be starring in the film. Later, Sanjay Dutt was then rumoured to play the role of coach according to Khan's insistence.

In December 2015, Randeep Hooda was later signed to play the role of Khan's coach in the film. Amit Sadh of Kai Po Che! fame was reportedly signed for the role of young Sultan. However, in March 2016, he confirmed that he is playing the role of Khan's younger brother. MMA fighter Tyron Woodley has been signed opposite Khan with other fighters in the film.

The role of Aarfa Ali Khan was offered to Deepika Padukone but she turned it down. The role was then offered to Kangana Ranaut who also turned it down. In January 2016, Anushka Sharma was signed to play the female lead role opposite Khan. For her role as a wrestler, Sharma took wrestling lessons for the film. In February 2016, Bosco-Caesar were signed as the choreographers of the film, replacing Vaibhavi Merchant who left the film due to personal commitments.

=== Filming ===
Pre-production of the film started in October 2015 where Khan posted a photo of his character in the film on Facebook. Principal photography of the film started in December 2015 at ND Studios, Karjat and JW Marriott Mumbai, where the film's first schedule was filmed. Filming of the first schedule had been completed in late December 2015. Filming of the second schedule was started in January 2016 where Khan filmed for action sequences. A song was filmed in early March 2016, choreographed by Farah Khan. An action sequence between Khan and Sharma was reportedly filmed. Some of the sequence of the movie will feature 360-year-old Jama Masjid of Delhi. In late April 2016 the lead actor Salman Khan was seen riding a scooter as a part of shooting in Muzaffarnagar, Uttar Pradesh.

== Music ==
Sultan

Soundtrack album by Vishal–Shekhar
- Released: 31 May 2016
- Recorded: 2016
- Studios: YRF Studios, Mumbai
- Genre: Feature film soundtrack
- Length: 1:00:57
- Language: Hindi
- Label: YRF Music
- Producer: Aditya Chopra

Vishal–Shekhar chronology
Fan (2016)	Sultan (2016)	Akira (2016)

The music for Sultan is composed by Vishal–Shekhar while the lyrics are penned by Irshad Kamil. The soundtrack album was released on 31 May 2016. The album features fourteen songs, with nine of them were included with the original soundtrack. On 6 June 2016, four songs sung by Salman Khan were released after the release of the original soundtrack. The bonus track "Raula Paye Gaya," which was sung by Rahat Fateh Ali Khan was released on 30 June 2016.

All lyrics are written by Irshad Kamil; all music is composed by Vishal–Shekhar.

Track listing
No.	Title	Singer(s)	Length
1.	"Baby Ko Bass Pasand Hai"	Vishal Dadlani, Shalmali Kholgade, Ishita, Badshah	4:13
2.	"Jag Ghoomeya" (Male)	Rahat Fateh Ali Khan	4:42
3.	"440 Volt"	Mika Singh	4:28
4.	"Sultan" (Title Track)	Sukhwinder Singh, Shadab Faridi	4:40
5.	"Sachi Muchi"	Mohit Chauhan, Harshdeep Kaur	3:59
6.	"Bulleya"	Papon	5:57
7.	"Tuk Tuk"	Nooran Sisters, Vishal Dadlani	4:12
8.	"Jag Ghoomeya" (Female)	Neha Bhasin	4:14
9.	"Rise of Sultan"	Shekhar Ravjiani	2:46
10.	"Raula Paye Gaya – The Official Sultan Salute"	Rahat Fateh Ali Khan, 6 Pack Band	3:31
11.	"Baby Nu Bass Pasand Hai" (Salman Khan Version)	Salman Khan, Iulia Vantur	4:16
12.	"Jag Ghoomeya" (Salman Khan Version)	Salman Khan	4:49
13.	"440 Volt" (Salman Khan Version)	Salman Khan	4:28
14.	"Sultan" (Salman Khan Version)	Salman Khan	4:42
Total length:			1:00:57

== Box office ==
=== Worldwide ===
The film grossed approx ₹206 crore from its first 3 days, becoming the first Indian film to do so. It grossed around ₹328 crore from its extended 5-day opening weekend. As of 3 August 2016, the movie grossed ₹416 crore in India and $24 million overseas, becoming the fourth-highest-grossing Indian film of all time. The film's worldwide gross was ₹589.25 crore prior to its China release, including ₹421.25 crore in India and ₹168 crore overseas. As of 9 September 2018, following its China release, the film has grossed ₹623.33 crore ($93 million) worldwide.

=== India ===
Sultan created a new record for advance bookings. On its day of release, Sultan received an average of 70% audience occupancy and netted approximately ₹36.54 crore. By the end of its second week, the film had netted an estimated ₹278 crore. Its final domestic gross was ₹421.25 crore.

=== Overseas ===
By 24 July 2016, the film had collected an estimated ₹39.69 crore in the United States and Canada, ₹52.94 crore in United Arab Emirates and Gulf Cooperation Council, ₹14.07 crore in United Kingdom, ₹6.65 crore in Australia, ₹30 crore in Pakistan, and ₹30 crore from other territories. In the United Kingdom, it opened with over £1 million and went on to gross £1.8 million by the end of the year, making it the UK's second highest-grossing foreign-language film of 2016 (below Dangal). As of 17 July 2016, the film had collected ₹2.93 crore in New Zealand and ₹1.09 crore in Malaysia. As of 10 July 2016, the film had earned ₹33 lakh in Germany.

Sultan's total overseas gross at the end of the third weekend stood at approximately $22.57 million (₹151.2 crore). By 3 August 2016, Sultan had made $24.2 million (₹161 crore) overseas gross, making it the sixth-highest-grossing Indian film in overseas markets. Its overseas gross was ₹180 crore prior to its China release.

In China, where the film released on 31 August 2018, the film grossed US$5.4 million as of 16 September 2018. The film peaked at number seven on the weekly China box office chart, during the week ending 9 September 2018. As of 9 September 2018, the film has grossed $29.82 million overseas.

== Critical reception ==
On the review aggregator website Rotten Tomatoes, 69% of 16 critics' reviews are positive, with an average rating of 5.9/10. The film received positive reviews from critics.

Bollywood Hungama rated the film 4.5/5. Srijana Mitra Das of The Times of India gave the film 4/5 stars. Rajeev Masand of CNN-News18 rated the film 3.5/5. Anupma Chopra of Hindustan Times rated the film 3/5. Similarly, Rohit Vats of Hindustan Times too, rated the film 3/5. Saibal Chatterjee of NDTV rated the 3/5 Shubhra Gupta of The Indian Express also rated the film 3/5 stars.

== Game ==
An official game based on this film has been released by 99Games for Android mobile phones.

== Piracy ==
On 6 July 2016, the film's digital copy was reported to be available in the darknet. Confirming that the copy was created from the sample sent by the producers to the CBFC board for review, cyber crime experts investigating the leak said, "The leak is confirmed. The copy of the movie is available on the darknet, and soon it will be available on torrent." However, Yash Raj Films, the film's producer, denied such development. Kislay Chaudhary, a private investigator, claimed that the links of the 2-hour-36-minute-long movie were available, and shared the screenshot of the same with Mail Today. "Many websites have been blocked since Tuesday evening, and links were removed immediately," he added.

== Awards and nominations ==
Year	Award Ceremony	Category	Recipient(s) and nominee(s)	Result
2016	Screen Awards	Best Actress (Jury's Choice)	Anushka Sharma	Nominated
2016	Stardust Awards	Best Film	Sultan	Won
2016	Stardust Awards	Best Actress	Anushka Sharma (along with Ae Dil Hai Mushkil)	Won
2016	Stardust Awards	Best Playback Singer (Female)	Neha Bhasin – Jag Ghoomeya	Won
2016	Stardust Awards	Best Costume Design	Alvira Khan Agnihotri; Ashley Rebello	Won
2016	Stardust Awards	Best Director	Ali Abbas Zafar	Nominated
2016	Stardust Awards	Best Actor	Salman Khan	Nominated
2016	Stardust Awards	Best Supporting Actor	Amit Sadh	Nominated
2016	Stardust Awards	Best Choreography	Farah Khan – Baby Ko Bass Pasand Hai	Nominated
2016	Stardust Awards	Best Music Album	Sultan – Yash Raj Music	Nominated
2016	Stardust Awards	Best Playback Singer (Male)	Rahat Fateh Ali Khan – Jag Ghoomeya	Nominated
2016	Stardust Awards	Best Playback Singer (Male)	Vishal Dadlani & Badshah – Baby Ko Bass Pasand Hai	Nominated
2016	Stardust Awards	Best Music Director	Vishal–Shekhar	Nominated
2016	Stardust Awards	Best Lyricist	Irshad Kamil – Jag Ghoomeya	Nominated
2016	Mirchi Music Awards	Song of the Year	"Jag Ghoomeya"	Nominated
2016	Mirchi Music Awards	Album of the Year	Vishal–Shekhar, Irshad Kamil	Nominated
2016	Mirchi Music Awards	Male Vocalist of the Year	Rahat Fateh Ali Khan – "Jag Ghoomeya"	Nominated
2016	Mirchi Music Awards	Female Vocalist of the Year	Neha Bhasin – "Jag Ghoomeya"	Nominated
2016	Mirchi Music Awards	Music Composer of the Year	Vishal–Shekhar – "Jag Ghoomeya"	Nominated
2016	Mirchi Music Awards	Lyricist of the Year	Irshad Kamil – "Jag Ghoomeya"	Nominated
2016	Mirchi Music Awards	Raag-Inspired Song of the Year	"Jag Ghoomeya"	Nominated
2016	Mirchi Music Awards	Best Song Producer (Programming & Arranging)	Kiran Kamath – "Baby Ko Bass Pasand Hai"	Nominated
2016	Mirchi Music Awards	Best Background Score	Julius Packiam	Nominated
2017	Filmfare Awards	Best Playback Singer (Female)	Neha Bhasin – Jag Ghoomeya	Won
2017	Filmfare Awards	Best Film	Sultan	Nominated
2017	Filmfare Awards	Best Director	Ali Abbas Zafar	Nominated
2017	Filmfare Awards	Best Actor	Salman Khan	Nominated
2017	Filmfare Awards	Best Music Director	Vishal–Shekhar	Nominated
2017	Filmfare Awards	Best Lyricist	Irshad Kamil – Jag Ghoomeya	Nominated
2017	Filmfare Awards	Best Playback Singer (Male)	Rahat Fateh Ali Khan – Jag Ghoomeya	Nominated
2017	Zee Cine Awards	Best Actor (Viewer's Choice)	Salman Khan	Won
2017	Zee Cine Awards	Best Actress (Viewer's Choice)	Anushka Sharma	Won
2017	Zee Cine Awards	Best Playback Singer (Female)	Neha Bhasin – Jag Ghoomeya	Won
2017	Zee Cine Awards	Best Lyricist	Irshad Kamil – Jag Ghoomeya	Won
2017	Zee Cine Awards	Best Sound Design	Dileep Subramanium; Ganesh Gangadharan	Won
2017	Zee Cine Awards	Best Film (Viewer's Choice)	Sultan	Nominated
2017	Zee Cine Awards	Best Song of the Year	Vishal–Shekhar – Baby Ko Bass Pasand Hai	Nominated
2017	Zee Cine Awards	Best Film (Jury's Choice)	Sultan	Nominated
2017	Zee Cine Awards	Best Director	Ali Abbas Zafar	Nominated
2017	Zee Cine Awards	Best Actor (Jury's Choice)	Salman Khan	Nominated
2017	Zee Cine Awards	Best Actress (Jury's Choice)	Anushka Sharma	Nominated
2017	Zee Cine Awards	Best Story	Ali Abbas Zafar	Nominated
2017	Zee Cine Awards	Best Music Director	Vishal–Shekhar	Nominated
2017	Zee Cine Awards	Best Lyricist	Irshad Kamil – Sultan (Title Song)	Nominated
2017	Zee Cine Awards	Best Playback Singer (Male)	Rahat Fateh Ali Khan – Jag Ghoomeya	Nominated
2017	Zee Cine Awards	Best Playback Singer (Male)	Sukhwinder Singh – Sultan (Title Song)	Nominated
2017	Zee Cine Awards	Best Choreography	Farah Khan – Baby Ko Bass Pasand Hai	Nominated
2017	Zee Cine Awards	Best Choreography	Vaibhavi Merchant – Jag Ghoomeya	Nominated
2017	Zee Cine Awards	Best Choreography	Vaibhavi Merchant – Sultan (Title Song)	Nominated
2017	Jackie Chan Action Movie Awards	Best Action Movie	Sultan	Won
2018	Tehran International Sports Film Festival	Best Director	Ali Abbas Zafar	Won
2018	Tehran International Sports Film Festival	Best Actor	Salman Khan	Won
2018	Tehran International Sports Film Festival	Best Actress	Anushka Sharma	Won
