= Ae Dil Hai Mushkil =

2016 Hindi film directed by Karan Johar

- Theatrical release poster
- Directed by: Karan Johar
- Screenplay by: Story and Screenplay: Karan Johar; Dialogues: Karan Johar; Niranjan Iyengar
- Produced by: Hiroo Yash Johar; Karan Johar; Apoorva Mehta
- Starring: Ranbir Kapoor; Anushka Sharma; Aishwarya Rai Bachchan
- Cinematography: Anil Mehta
- Edited by: Manik Dawar
- Music by: Pritam
- Production company: Dharma Productions
- Distributed by: Fox Star Studios (India); Magic Cloud Media & Entertainment (Overseas)
- Release date: 28 October 2016
- Running time: 160 minutes
- Country: India
- Language: Hindi
- Budget: ₹50 crore
- Box office: ₹239.67 crore

Ae Dil Hai Mushkil (transl. O Heart, It Is Difficult) is a 2016 Indian Hindi-language musical romantic drama film directed, produced and written by Karan Johar under his banner Dharma Productions. The film stars Ranbir Kapoor, Anushka Sharma and Aishwarya Rai Bachchan in the lead roles.

Ae Dil Hai Mushkil released worldwide on 28 October 2016 coinciding with the festival of Diwali. The film's soundtrack composed by Pritam was an instant blockbuster, thus enhancing its hype, with lyrics written by Amitabh Bhattacharya and songs sung by Arijit Singh. Despite having clashed with Ajay Devgn's Shivaay, it went on to gross ₹237.56 crore (US$25 million) worldwide. The film proved to be one of the year's top-grossing films in domestic and overseas markets. It received mixed reviews from critics upon release, with praise for its direction, music, cinematography, and performances of the cast, with particular praise directed towards Sharma, Kapoor and Rai’s performances, but the story and screenplay received criticism.

At the 62nd Filmfare Awards, Ae Dil Hai Mushkil received a leading 9 nominations (tying with Udta Punjab) for Best Director (Johar), Best Actress (Sharma) and Best Actor (Kapoor), and won 4 awards, including Best Music Director (Pritam), Best Lyricist (Bhattacharya for "Channa Mereya") and Best Male Playback Singer (Arijit Singh for "Ae Dil Hai Mushkil").

== Plot ==
The film begins with an interview with Ayan, a singer who has recently achieved fame through his non-film songs. He recounts his experience with love in a flashback. A few years earlier, in London, Ayan and Alizeh meet by chance at a disco and hook up before becoming friends. When they discover that their respective partners are cheating on them, they end their relationships: Ayan with Lisa D'Souza and Alizeh with "Dr." Faisal Khan. They then travel to Paris for a week together. Ayan falls in love with Alizeh but does not confess his feelings because she sees him only as a "friend". When Alizeh encounters her ex-boyfriend Ali, who wants to reconcile, she decides to reunite with him, despite her lingering feelings. She gradually stops spending time with Ayan, and they lose contact.

Alizeh later invites Ayan to her wedding to Ali in Lucknow. Shaken, he accepts and confesses his love to her at the wedding, but she rejects him. Heartbroken, Ayan leaves. At the airport, while boarding a flight to Dubai, he meets Saba, an older woman and poet travelling to Vienna. She consoles him, gives him a book of her poetry and her phone number, and he becomes deeply moved by her writing. Three months later, Ayan contacts Saba after arriving in Vienna. They meet at a club, dance together and hook up. Saba, who is divorced and believes she no longer has room for love, initially rejects Ayan's advances but later agrees to date him.

Having blocked all contact with Alizeh, Ayan eventually calls her after being inspired by Saba. Alizeh is pleased to hear from him and says she has missed their friendship. Ayan sends her photographs of himself with Saba to make her jealous, while Alizeh describes her happy life with Ali and assumes Ayan has moved on.

When Alizeh announces that she is coming to Vienna, Ayan invites her to dinner with Saba in an attempt to provoke jealousy. Saba recognises his motive. Before Alizeh leaves, Ayan accuses her of being heartless and incapable of feeling emotion. She replies that she does love him, but not romantically. After they argue, Ayan leaves and returns to Saba, who tells him that she has genuinely fallen in love with him. Knowing that he cannot love her as he loves Alizeh, however, she ends their relationship, unwilling to endure the pain of knowing that she will never receive the love she sees in his eyes for Alizeh.

Ayan continues to love Alizeh and becomes a famous singer through his music channel. He later meets Ali, who reveals that he and Alizeh have separated. Ali explains that, although Alizeh loved him, she never received the love she believed she deserved, and that she has been untraceable for two years. Ayan waits for Alizeh at her favourite spot for two days, where she eventually appears and reveals that she has been diagnosed with stage four cancer and has little time left. Heartbroken, Ayan tries to make the most of their remaining time together and persuade Alizeh to love him romantically, but she cannot reciprocate his feelings. After an argument, she leaves because Ayan refuses to accept that she cannot pretend to love him simply to make him happy.

The following morning, Ayan searches for Alizeh and apparently reaches the airport, fulfilling her final wish before her death. He eventually accepts that they can remain friends, but nothing more. The screen fades to black before returning to the present, where Ayan, now a popular singer, continues his interview about the love of his life. He performs "Channa Mereya", inspired by his one-sided love for Alizeh, and concludes the interview.

== Cast ==
- Ranbir Kapoor as Ayan Sanger
- Anushka Sharma as Alizeh Khan
- Aishwarya Rai Bachchan as Saba Tahir Khan
- Fawad Khan as DJ Ali Ahmed
- Lisa Haydon as Lisa D'Souza
- Imran Abbas as Dr. Faisal Khan

=== Cameo Appearances ===
- Shah Rukh Khan as Tahir Taliyar Khan, Saba's ex-husband
- Alia Bhatt as DJ in "The Breakup Song"
- Neha Dhupia in a voiceover appearance as Ayan's interviewer

== Production ==
=== Development ===
"...it is not a conventional love story or love triangle. It's a film that dwells deeply on relationships, heartbreaks and how love completes you, defines you and yet leaves you wanting for more. I have never had, in my entire career, a film that has come to me so fast, so organically and so from within."

— Karan Johar speaking about the film in an interview with The Times of India

Ae Dil Hai Mushkil was first announced in November 2014. At the time, writer-director Karan Johar, who had previously helmed Student of the Year (2012), said that for the past year and a half, he had been developing a story that he needed to work on for several months. However, while he was in New York, the idea for Ae Dil Hai Mushkil (named after a song from the 1956 film C.I.D. starring Dev Anand, Shakila and Waheeda Rehman) came to him and he wrote the screenplay in 30 days. When he came back to India, he spoke to the three lead actors and they all signed on immediately.

Johar stated that he was motivated to cast Ranbir Kapoor and Anushka Sharma in the film after getting to know them as a co-star in Anurag Kashyap's Bombay Velvet (2015), which marked Johar's second film role after Dilwale Dulhania Le Jayenge (1995).

Johar added that he was excited to cast Aishwarya Rai Bachchan after several unsuccessful attempts to cast her in his previous films Kuch Kuch Hota Hai (1998), Kabhi Khushi Kabhie Gham... (2001), Kal Ho Naa Ho (2003) and Kabhi Alvida Naa Kehna (2006). Explaining this in an interview, he stated, "[F]inally, when it comes to Ae Dil Hai Mushkil, I would like to say that the most indispensable casting was Aishwarya Rai Bachchan’s. If Ranbir hadn't agreed, I would have found a solution; if Anushka hadn’t agreed, I would have had another option. But for Aishwarya, there were no alternatives. If she hadn’t agreed, I wouldn’t have been able to make the film. The role of Saba was such that only Aishwarya Rai could have played it. When you watch the film, I’m not just saying this, you’ll see that you wouldn’t be able to imagine anyone else in that role either.".

Fawad Khan, who had recently appeared in Johar-produced Kapoor & Sons (2016), was cast to play the role of a DJ, described as "not exactly a cameo as it becomes a backbone for a certain conflict of a character" in the film.

Lisa Haydon also confirmed that she will appear in the film. At the Toronto International Film Festival in September 2016, Johar confirmed that Shah Rukh Khan had also filmed a scene for the film.

On 6 February at the India Conference at Harvard, Johar revealed that in the film, Kapoor plays the character of a Hindu boy named Ayan, and Sharma plays a Muslim girl named Alizeh.

=== Filming ===
Principal photography began in September 2015 with Sharma and Kapoor in London. At the end of September, the team filmed some portions in Paris. In October, they began shooting in various locations in Austria, including the city of Vienna. Rai Bachchan joined the crew in Vienna in mid-October after the release of her film Jazbaa (2015). In March 2016, Kapoor, Sharma, and Khan were seen filming in Mandawa, Rajasthan. In July 2016, Johar tweeted a photo of Kapoor and Sharma on set in Mumbai for the last schedule.

== Release ==
=== Screening issue ===
On 8 October 2016, the Indian political party, Maharashtra Navnirman Sena (MNS), proclaimed that they would not allow the release of the film, following nationwide protests surrounding the terrorist attack in Jammu and Kashmir on 18 September 2016 and the decision by Cinema Owners Exhibitors Association of India preventing the release of films with Pakistani actors in four states – Maharashtra, Gujarat, Karnataka, and Goa. Citing the casting of Pakistani actor Fawad Khan in the film, the MNS warned theater owners around the country to not screen the film, threatening them with vandalism. Announcing that security will be tightened at theaters along with sufficient police protection, Maharashtra chief minister, Devendra Fadnavis, commented on the issue, saying, "Anyone found taking the law into their hands will be dealt with firmly." He also informed that 12 MNS members were sent to judicial custody after they barged into a Mumbai theater and held a protest on 19 October 2016.

Commenting on the ruckus behind his film's release, Johar released a video stating that the circumstances in which the film was shot in 2015 were completely different. "Going forward, I would like to say that of course, I will not engage with talent from the neighbouring country, given the circumstance. But with that same energy, I beseech you to know one thing – that over 300 people in my Indian crew have put their blood, sweat, and tears into making my film, Ae Dil Hai Mushkil. I don't think it's fair for them to face any kind of turbulence on account of other fellow Indians," he further added in a video statement. He was heavily criticized by the news and social media for buckling under pressure. However, people from the film fraternity like Mukesh Bhatt and Shyam Benegal supported Johar and his film, and requested the people to consider the film and its release without giving importance to the actors' nationalities.

On 20 October 2016, Mukesh Bhatt said that his discussion with the Union home minister, Rajnath Singh, had been consequential, and affirmed that the film will be screened throughout the country without any violence. However, he promised that he would not make any more films with Pakistani actors.

== Reception ==
=== Box office ===
Ae Dil Hai Mushkil was made on a total budget of over ₹50 crore, including marketing and distribution costs. Prior to its release, the film had already recouped ₹75 crore ($11.2 million) from music, satellite and digital rights, so it needed to recover only ₹25 crore ($3.7 million) from the domestic box office. Worldwide, the film earned ₹90.84 crore ($13.6 million) on its opening weekend, while ComScore reported an estimated $12.8 million from 14 markets. As of November, it has made $21.3 million worldwide.

In India, its domestic market, the film had to compete with Shivaay which was released on the same day during the lucrative Diwali weekend. On its opening day, the film made ₹13.30 crore, the third biggest for both Sharma and Kapoor, and the sixth biggest for a Bollywood film of the year. Through its opening weekend, it scored a debut of ₹35.60 crore ($5.3 million) net in its three days on 3,200 screens, equating to a gross ₹49.84 crore ($7.65 million), the ninth-biggest debut of the year and the best ever debut for Johar, beating My Name is Khan's ₹315.0 million ($4.7 million). On Monday, it saw a hike in ticket sales, earning ₹17.75 crore ($2.65 million) due to the holiday season. In its first full week, the film earned ₹801.9 million ($12 million) in India alone and $20.2 million worldwide. The film continued to dominate the box office in its second weekend, earning $3.2 million from 2,000 screens (−1,200 screens). In just 10 days, the film earned ₹97.17 crore ($14.6 million) net and has become the sixth highest-grossing Bollywood film in India. Moreover, the film now ranks as the highest-earner for Rai Bachchan, beating Dhoom 2's ₹82.30 crore ($12.3 million) in 2006; the fourth biggest for Sharma as well as for Kapoor.

In the United Kingdom, it recorded the biggest Bollywood opening of the year with ₹4.88 crore ($772,891), debuting at eighth place at the U.K. box office. However, this is inclusive of previews. Including previews, Sultan would be the clear winner with a $1.3 million debut in July. But excluding previews, Ae Dil Hai Mushkil is ahead of the former. In the United States and Canada, the film received a limited release across 302 theaters and grossed ₹14 crore ($2.13 million) in its opening weekend finishing in tenth place.

By the end of its theatrical run, the film grossed ₹160.69 crore in India and ₹237.56 crore worldwide, thus becoming a blockbuster at the box office.

=== Critical response ===
Ae Dil Hai Mushkil received mixed reviews from critics upon release, with praise for its direction, music, cinematography, and performances of the cast, with particular praise directed towards Sharma, Kapoor and Rai’s performances.

On the review aggregator website Rotten Tomatoes, 53% of 17 critics' reviews are positive, with an average rating of 5.6/10. Metacritic, which uses a weighted average, assigned the film a score of 40 out of 100, based on 4 critics, indicating "mixed or average" reviews.

Bollywood Hungama gave 4/5 ratings and commented, "a contemporary and a progressive take on relationships from the master storyteller Karan Johar".

Raja Sen and Sukanya Verma of Rediff.com respectively rated 4/5 and 3.5/5 and said, "Thank you, Karan Johar for this film feels like a sob. Johar has improved massively as a storyteller, this film is more polished and assured than anything he's done before." and, "As evident by his body of work, Karan Johar has a sweet spot for this attribute, in the splendidly romantic and richly satisfying Ae Dil Hai Mushkil."

Nihit Bhave of The Times of India rated 3.5/5 and said, "a beautiful-looking film that isn't bereft of logic".

Rajeev Masand of News 18 gave the film 3.5 out of 5 stars and said, "Despite the occasionally mawkish undertones and the blatant attempt at emotional manipulation in its final act, Ae Dil Hai Mushkil gives you a hero that makes you care. I suspect you’ll be a slobbering mess at the end of the film, a puddle of tears when the lights come back on. Johar knows how to do that. It's a skill that's stayed with him even if his grammar has changed."

Subhash K. Jha of Deccan Chronicle rated 2.5/5 and said, "Ae Dil Hai Mushkil is one good looking film with actors who epitomize human beauty." Sweta Kaushal of Hindustan Times rated 2.5/5, saying "Ae Dil Hai Mushkil offers little in terms of story and fails to get the audience empathize or feel for the characters and events in the movie."

Shubhra Gupta of The Indian Express rated 2/5 and said, "Johar is unable to go the extra mile, hope that Johar will come up with something newer and sharper the next time around." Mike McCahill of The Guardian rated 2/5 and said, "Despite controversy over the casting, Karan Johar's romance has a failure of nerve about Hindu-Muslim relations."

The Hindu commented, "Ae Dil Hai Mushkil is the latest in the brand of cinema that isn't so much as plot driven as it is focused on characters, relationships, and interactions."

Reuters commented, "Ae Dil Hai Mushkil has neither gravitas nor the charm to be worth remembering."

== Accolades ==
Award	Date of ceremony	Category	Recipient(s) and nominee(s)	Result	Ref(s)
Filmfare Awards	14 January 2017				
Filmfare Awards	14 January 2017		Best Director	Karan Johar	Nominated
Filmfare Awards	14 January 2017		Best Actress	Anushka Sharma	Nominated
Filmfare Awards	14 January 2017		Best Actor	Ranbir Kapoor	Nominated
Filmfare Awards	14 January 2017		Best Music Director	Pritam	Won
Filmfare Awards	14 January 2017		Best Lyricist	Amitabh Bhattacharya for "Channa Mereya"	Won
Filmfare Awards	14 January 2017		Best Male Playback Singer	Arijit Singh for "Ae Dil Hai Mushkil"	Won
Filmfare Awards	14 January 2017		Best Female Playback Singer	Jonita Gandhi for "The Breakup Song"	Nominated
Filmfare Awards	14 January 2017		R. D. Burman Award for New Music Talent	Amit Mishra for "Bulleya"	Won
Screen Awards	4 December 2016	Best Actress	Anushka Sharma	Nominated	
Screen Awards	4 December 2016	Best Actor	Ranbir Kapoor	Nominated	
Screen Awards	4 December 2016	Best Supporting Actress	Aishwarya Rai Bachchan	Nominated	
Screen Awards	4 December 2016	Best Music Director	Pritam	Won	
Screen Awards	4 December 2016	Best Lyricist	Amitabh Bhattacharya for "Ae Dil Hai Mushkil"	Won	
Screen Awards	4 December 2016	Best Male Playback Singer	Amit Mishra for "Bulleya"	Won	
Stardust Awards	20 December 2016	Best Film	Hiroo Yash Johar, Karan Johar	Nominated	
Stardust Awards	20 December 2016	Best Director	Karan Johar	Won	
Stardust Awards	20 December 2016	Best Actress	Anushka Sharma (also for Sultan)	Won	
Stardust Awards	20 December 2016	Best Actor	Ranbir Kapoor	Nominated	
Stardust Awards	20 December 2016	Best Supporting Actress	Aishwarya Rai Bachchan	Nominated	
Stardust Awards	20 December 2016	Best Music Album	Sony Music India	Won	
Stardust Awards	20 December 2016	Best Music Director	Pritam	Won	
Stardust Awards	20 December 2016	Best Lyricist	Amitabh Bhattacharya for "Channa Mereya"	Won	
Stardust Awards	20 December 2016	Best Lyricist	Amitabh Bhattacharya for "Ae Dil Hai Mushkil"	Nominated	
Stardust Awards	20 December 2016	Best Playback Singer (Male)	Arijit Singh for "Ae Dil Hai Mushkil"	Nominated	
Stardust Awards	20 December 2016	Best Playback Singer (Male)	Arijit Singh for "Channa Mereya"	Won	
Stardust Awards	20 December 2016	Best Playback Singer (Female)	Jonita Gandhi for "The Breakup Song"	Nominated	
Stardust Awards	20 December 2016	Best Costume Design	Manish Malhotra, Anaita Shroff Adajania and Samidha Wangnoo	Nominated	
Mirchi Music Awards	18 February 2017	Song of the Year	"Ae Dil Hai Mushkil"	Nominated	
Mirchi Music Awards	18 February 2017	Song of the Year	"Bulleya"	Nominated	
Mirchi Music Awards	18 February 2017	Song of the Year	"Channa Mereya"	Won	
Mirchi Music Awards	18 February 2017	Song of the Year	"Channa Mereya (Unplugged)"	Nominated	
Mirchi Music Awards	18 February 2017	Album of the Year	Pritam and Amitabh Bhattacharya	Won	
Mirchi Music Awards	18 February 2017	Male Vocalist of the Year	Amit Mishra for "Bulleya"	Nominated	
Mirchi Music Awards	18 February 2017	Male Vocalist of the Year	Arijit Singh for "Ae Dil Hai Mushkil"	Won	
Mirchi Music Awards	18 February 2017	Male Vocalist of the Year	Arijit Singh for "Channa Mereya"	Nominated	
Mirchi Music Awards	18 February 2017	Female Vocalist of the Year	Jonita Gandhi for ""The Breakup Song""	Nominated	
Mirchi Music Awards	18 February 2017	Female Vocalist of the Year	Shilpa Rao for "Bulleya"	Nominated	
Mirchi Music Awards	18 February 2017	Music Composer of the Year	Pritam for "Ae Dil Hai Mushkil"	Won	
Mirchi Music Awards	18 February 2017	Music Composer of the Year	Pritam for "Bulleya"	Nominated	
Mirchi Music Awards	18 February 2017	Music Composer of the Year	Pritam for "Channa Mereya"	Nominated	
Mirchi Music Awards	18 February 2017	Lyricist of the Year	Amitabh Bhattacharya for "Ae Dil Hai Mushkil"	Nominated	
Mirchi Music Awards	18 February 2017	Lyricist of the Year	Amitabh Bhattacharya for "Bulleya"	Nominated	
Mirchi Music Awards	18 February 2017	Lyricist of the Year	Amitabh Bhattacharya for "Channa Mereya"	Won	
Mirchi Music Awards	18 February 2017	Best Background Score	Pritam	Nominated	
Mirchi Music Awards	18 February 2017	Best Song Engineer (Recording & Mixing)	Shadab Rayeen, Sunny M. R. & Ashwin Kulkarni for "Bulleya"	Nominated	
International Indian Film Academy Awards	14–15 July 2017	Best Film	Hiroo Yash Johar, Karan Johar	Nominated	
International Indian Film Academy Awards	14–15 July 2017	Best Director	Karan Johar	Nominated	
International Indian Film Academy Awards	14–15 July 2017	Best Actress	Anushka Sharma	Nominated	
International Indian Film Academy Awards	14–15 July 2017	Best Actor	Ranbir Kapoor	Nominated	
International Indian Film Academy Awards	14–15 July 2017	Best Music Direction	Pritam	Won	
International Indian Film Academy Awards	14–15 July 2017	Best Lyricist	Amitabh Bhattacharya for "Channa Mereya"	Won	
International Indian Film Academy Awards	14–15 July 2017	Best Male Playback Singer	Amit Mishra for "Bulleya"	Won	
International Indian Film Academy Awards	14–15 July 2017	Best Male Playback Singer	Arijit Singh for "Channa Mereya"	Nominated	
International Indian Film Academy Awards	14–15 July 2017	Best Background Score	Pritam	Won	
International Indian Film Academy Awards	14–15 July 2017	Best Cinematography	Anil Mehta	Won	
International Indian Film Academy Awards	14–15 July 2017	Best Costume Design	Manish Malhotra	Won	
International Indian Film Academy Awards	14–15 July 2017	Best Sound Recording	Shadab Rayeen	Won	
