= Shadab Rayeen =

Indian sound engineer

- Born: 6 January 1980 (age 46); Patna, Bihar, India
- Occupation: Sound engineer
- Relatives: Sunny M. R. (brother)

Shadab Rayeen is Indian sound engineer. His best known work is the mix of Ae Dil Hai Mushkil. He has received the "Best Recording Engineer Award" in the category of Technical Awards for the mix of Ae Dil Hai Mushkil by International Indian Film Academy Awards.

== Filmography ==
=== Mixing and mastering - film music ===
- 2008, Jodhaa Akbar
- 2008, Slumdog Millionaire
- 2009, Dehli 6
- 2009, Kick
- 2009, Anjaneyulu
- 2009, Eeram
- 2009, Couples Retreat
- 2009, Blue
- 2009, Wake Up Sid
- 2010, 127 Hours
- 2010, Udaan
- 2010, Aisha
- 2010, Brindaavanam
- 2011, No One Killed Jessica
- 2011, Chillar Party
- 2011, Kanchana
- 2011, Dookudu
- 2011, Vaagai Sooda Vaa
- 2012, Ishaqzaade
- 2012, Barfi!
- 2012, English Vinglish
- 2012, Aiyyaa
- 2012, Luv Shuv Tey Chicken Khurana
- 2013, Naayak
- 2013, Kanna Laddu Thinna Aasaiya
- 2013, Race 2
- 2013, Kai Po Che!
- 2013, Swamy Ra Ra
- 2013, Settai
- 2013, Baadshah
- 2013, Bombay Talkies
- 2013, Yeh Jawaani Hai Deewani
- 2013, Raanjhanaa
- 2013, Ghanchakkar
- 2013, Balupu
- 2013, Lootera
- 2013, Queen
- 2013, Dhoom 3
- 2013, Uyyala Jampala
- 2014, Vallinam
- 2014, Shaadi Ke Side Effects
- 2014, Race Gurram
- 2014, Holiday: A Soldier is Never Off Duty
- 2014, Vadacurry
- 2014, Creature 3D
- 2014, Run Raja Run
- 2014, Bang Bang!
- 2014, Happy New Year
- 2014, Rowdy Fellow
- 2015, Dilwale
- 2015, Hawaizaada
- 2015, Kaaki Sattai
- 2015, Hunterrr
- 2015, Uttama Villain
- 2015, Baankey Ki Crazy Baraat
- 2015, Bombay Velvet
- 2015, Wecolme 2 Karachi
- 2015, Papanasam
- 2015, Guddu Rangeela
- 2015, Bajrangi Bhaijaan
- 2015, Vaalu
- 2015, Phantom
- 2015, Shaandaar
- 2015, Bengal Tiger
- 2015, Dilwale
- 2015, Tamasha
- 2016, Rustom
- 2016, Dishoom
- 2016, Azhar
- 2016, Fitoor
- 2016, Neerja
- 2018, Udta Punjab
- 2016, Akira
- 2016, Banjo
- 2016, Ae Dil Hai Mushkil
- 2016, Dear Zindagi
- 2016, Dangal
- 2016, Baar Baar Dekho
- 2016, Remo
- 2017, Thodi Thodi Si Manmaaniyan
- 2017, Toilet Ek Prem Katha
- 2017, Dobaara: See Your Evil
- 2017, Jagga Jasoos
- 2017, Raabta
- 2017, Jab Harry Met Sejal
- 2017, Aa Gaya Hero
- 2017, Vivegam
- 2017, Bareilly Ki Barfi
- 2017, Baahubali 2: The Conclusion
- 2017, Rukh
- 2017, Raees
- 2017, Tubelight
- 2017, Simran
- 2017, Secret Superstar
- 2017, Hind Ka Napak Ko Jawab: MSG Lion Heart 2
- 2017, Dil Jo Na Keh Saka
- 2017, Tumhari Sulu
- 2017, Naam Shabana
- 2017, Velaikkaran
- 2018, Thaanaa Serndha Koottam
- 2018, Kanaa
- 2018, Namaste England
- 2018, October
- 2018, Raid
- 2018, Simmba
- 2018, Hotel Milan
- 2018, Veere Di Wedding
- 2018, Mulk
- 2018, Kedarnath
- 2018, FryDay
- 2018, Fanney Khan
- 2018, Bhavesh Joshi Superhero
- 2018, Blackmail
- 2018, Padman
- 2018, Andhadhun
- 2018, Daas Dev
- 2018, Vodka Diaries
- 2018, The Extraordinary Journey of the Fakir
- 2018, Satyameva Jayate
- 2018, Aiyaary
- 2019, Commando 3
- 2019, Praana
- 2019, Kissebaaz
- 2019, Jabariya Jodi
- 2019, Uri: The Surgical Strike
- 2019, Mr. & Ms. Rowdy
- 2019, Badla
- 2019, Batla House
- 2019, Kalank
- 2019, Milan Talkies
- 2019, India's Most Wanted
- 2019, Mission Mangal
- 2019, Saand Ki Aankh
- 2019, Judgementall Hai Kya
- 2019, Waah Zindagi
- 2019, Kabir Singh
- 2019, Sye Raa Narasimha Reddy
- 2019, Notebook
- 2019, Chhichhore
- 2019, Sangathamizhan
- 2019, Kakshi: Amminippilla
- 2020, Kaamyaab
- 2020, Miss India
- 2020, Sayonee
- 2020, Ludo
- 2020, Ala Vaikunthapurramuloo
- 2020, Love Aaj Kal
- 2020, V
- 2020, Gulabo Sitabo
- 2020, Solo Brathuke So Better
- 2020, Waah Zindagi
- 2021, Sashi
- 2021, Ek Mini Katha
- 2021, Vakeel Saab
- 2021, SR Kalyanamandapam
- 2021, Maha Samudram
- 2021, Most Eligible Bachelor
- 2021, Doctor
- 2022, Sarkaru Vaari Paata
- 2022, Bheemla Nayak
- 2022, Beast
- 2022, Karthikeya 2
- 2022, Phone Bhoot
- 2023, Ghoomer
- 2024, Guntur Kaaram
- 2024, Ajayante Randam Moshanam
- 2025, Sankranthiki Vasthunam
- 2025, They Call Him OG
- 2026, Cocktail 2
- 2026, "Lenin"
- 2026, "Anomie The Equation Of Death"
- 2026, "The Kerala Story 2"
- 2026, "Rakasa"
- 2026, "Idhayam Murali"
- 2026, "Dhurandhar The Revange"
- 2026, "Bhooth Bangla"
- 2026, "S Saraswathi"
- 2026, "Toaster"
- 2026, "Korean Kanakaraju"
- 2026, "Irandu Vaanam"
- 2026, "Krishnavataram"
- 2026, "Itllu Arjuna"
- 2026, "Sigma"
- 2026, "Bharat Bhhagya Viddhaaata"

== Awards and nominations ==
Award ceremony	Category	Nominated work	Result	Ref
10th Mirchi Music Awards	Best Song Engineer (Recording & Mixing)	"Naughty Billo" from Phillauri	Nominated	
10th Mirchi Music Awards	Best Song Engineer (Recording & Mixing)	"Radio(Film Version)" from Tubelight	Nominated	
Indian Recording Arts Academy Awards	Song Recording & Mixing ( Film or Web Release) - Hindi	"Kaise Hua" from Kabir Singh	Won	
