= Mirchi Music Award for Song of The Year =

Annual music awards by Radio Mirchi for filmi

The Mirchi Music Award for Song of The Year is given yearly by Radio Mirchi as a part of its annual Mirchi Music Awards for Hindi films, to recognise the best song of that year.

== List of winners ==
- 2009 "Jashn-E-Bahara" - Jodhaa Akbar
  - "Behka" - Ghajini
  - "Kabhi Kabhi Aditi" - Jaane Tu... Ya Jaane Na
  - "Khuda Jaane" - Bachna Ae Haseeno
  - "Khwaja Mere Khwaja" - Jodhaa Akbar
- 2010 "Masakali" - Delhi-6
  - "Dhan Te Nan" - Kaminey
  - "Iktara" - Wake Up Sid
  - "Jai Ho" - Slumdog Millionaire
  - "Arziyan" - Delhi-6
- 2011 "Munni Badnaam Hui" - Dabangg
  - "Tere Naina" - My Name is Khan
  - "Sajda" - My Name is Khan
  - "Sheila Ki Jawani" -Tees Maar Khan
  - "Tere Mast Mast Do Nain" - Dabangg
- 2012 "Senorita" - Zindagi Na Milegi Dobara
  - "Nadaan Parinde" - Rockstar
  - "Sadda Haq" - Rockstar
  - "Chammak Challo" - Ra.One
  - "Ooh La La" - The Dirty Picture
- 2013 "Abhi Mujh Mein Kahin" - Agneepath
  - "Tum Hi Ho Bandhu" - Cocktail
  - "Dagabaaz Re" - Dabangg 2
  - "Radha" - Student of the Year
  - "Pani Da Rang" - Vicky Donor
- 2014 "Tum Hi Ho" - Aashiqui 2
  - "Sunn Raha Hai" - Aashiqui 2
  - "Badtameez Dil" - Yeh Jawaani Hai Deewani
  - "Zinda" - Bhaag Milkha Bhaag
  - "Bhaag Milkha Bhaag" - Bhaag Milkha Bhaag
- 2015 "Zehnaseeb" - Hasee Toh Phasee
  - "London Thumakda" - Queen
  - "Manwa Laage" - Happy New Year
  - "Galliyan" - Ek Villain
  - "Muskurane" - CityLights
- 2016 "Gerua" - Dilwale
  - "Agar Tum Saath Ho" - Tamasha
  - "Sooraj Dooba Hain" - Roy
  - "Deewani Mastani" from Bajirao Mastani
  - "Chunar" from ABCD 2
- 2017 "Channa Mereya" - Ae Dil Hai Mushkil
  - "Haanikaarak Bapu" - Dangal
  - "Channa Mereya (Unplugged)" - Ae Dil Hai Mushkil
  - "Bulleya" - Ae Dil Hai Mushkil
  - "Jag Ghoomeya" - Sultan
  - "Ae Dil Hai Mushkil" - Ae Dil Hai Mushkil
- 2018 "Hawayein" - Jab Harry Met Sejal
  - "Maana Ke Hum Yaar Nahin" - Meri Pyaari Bindu
  - "Baarish" - Half Girlfriend
  - "Roke Na Ruke Naina" - Badrinath Ki Dulhania
  - "Aashiq Surrender Hua" - Badrinath Ki Dulhania
- 2019 "Ghoomar" - Padmaavat
  - "Tareefan" - Veere Di Wedding
  - "Khalibali" - Padmaavat
  - "Bom Diggy" - Sonu Ke Titu Ki Sweety
  - "Ae Watan (Male)" - Raazi
- 2020 "Kalank" - Kalank
  - "Chashni" - Bharat
  - "Apna Time Ayega" - Gully Boy
  - "Tujhe Kitna Chahne Lage" - Kabir Singh
  - "Challa" - Uri: The Surgical Strike
  - "Ghungroo" - War
- 2021 "Abhi Mujh Mein Kahin" ( Song of the Decade ) - Agneepath
- 2022 "Raataan Lambiyan" – Shershaah
  - "Aabaad Barbaad" – Ludo
  - "Chaka Chak" – Atrangi Re
  - "Mann Bharryaa 2.0" – Shershaah
  - "Ranjha" – Shershaah
- 2023 "Kesariya" – Brahmāstra: Part One – Shiva
  - "Dholida" – Gangubai Kathiawadi
  - "Jab Saiyaan" – Gangubai Kathiawadi
  - "Ghodey Pe Sawaar" – Qala
  - "Shauq" – Qala
- 2024 "Besharam Rang" – Pathaan

== See also ==
- Mirchi Music Awards
- Bollywood
- Cinema of India
