= Soch Na Sake =

Song by Amaal Malik, Arijit Singh and Tulsi Kumar

Song by Amaal Mallik, Arijit Singh, Tulsi Kumar

from the album Airlift
- Language: Hindi, Punjabi
- Released: 17 December 2015
- Length: 4:40
- Label: T-Series
- Composer: Amaal Mallik
- Lyricist: Kumaar

Music video
- "Soch Na Sake" on YouTube

"Soch Na Sake" (transl. Can't think of) is a song from the 2016 Hindi film Airlift, an adapted version of Harrdy Sandhu's song "Soch", sung by Arijit Singh and Tulsi Kumar. The lyrics for the song are written by Kumaar and the music is composed by Amaal Mallik. The song is a melodious mixture of Hindi and Punjabi lyrics. A solo version of the song, sung by Arijit Singh, was also released.

== Music video ==
=== Synopsis ===
The song is picturized upon Akshay Kumar and Nimrat Kaur, the leads of the film. The song expresses the anguish that couples feel when they part, and the deep bond they share. The song starts with Ranjit (Akshay) leaving his love Amrita (Nimrat) for Baghdad in order to negotiate a safe passages for the stranded Indian refugees in Kuwait City. A flashback is shown where the couple visualize the moments which they spent with each other.

== Accolades ==
It won 2017 Mirchi Music Award for Listeners' Choice Song of The Year. Arijit Singh and Tulsi Kumar won 2016 GiMA MTV Duet of the Year Award for the song under non-film category. Tulsi Kumar won Best Female Playback Singer award for the song at IIFA Awards.
