= Channa Mereya =

Song composed by Pritam and sang by Arijit Singh

Song by Pritam featuring Arijit Singh

from the album Ae Dil Hai Mushkil
- Language: Hindustani
- Released: 29 September 2016
- Recorded: 2015
- Genre: Hindustani classical music Semi-classical music Sufi music
- Length: 4:49
- Label: Sony Music India
- Composer: Pritam
- Lyricist: Amitabh Bhattacharya

Ae Dil Hai Mushkil track listing
- 1. "Ae Dil Hai Mushkil"; 2. "Bulleya"; 3. "Channa Mereya"; 4. "The Breakup Song"; 5. "Cutipie"; 6. "Alizeh"; 7. "Bulleya (Reprise)"; 8. "Channa Mereya (Unplugged)"; 9. "Aaj Jaane Ki Zid Na Karo"; 10. "Channa Mereya (Remix Version)"; 11. "Ae Dil Hai Mushkil (Mashup)"

Music video
- "Channa Mereya" on YouTube

Channa Mereya (transl. My Moon) is a Bollywood song from the film Ae Dil Hai Mushkil. The song is penned by Amitabh Bhattacharya, composed by Pritam and sung by Arijit Singh. It was released on 29 September 2016 by Sony Music India.

The lyrics with Sufi touch brings out the emotions from a heart broken soul and then tries to heal the wounded soul with the extended poetic verse – "Sachi mohabbat shayad wahi hai, jisme junoon hai, par do dilon ki yaari mein bhi toh kitna sukoon hai" which means "True love is that which is fuelled by madness, but no less is the friendship of two hearts in which resides peace" and also with the couplet – "Ek tarfa pyaar ki taqat hi kuch aur hoti hai. Auron ki rishton ki tarah ye do logo mei nahi battata, sirf mera haq hai ispe" which talks about unrequited love and its impact. Karan Johar, director of the film, approved "Channa Mereya" the moment he heard the song, stated Bhattacharya in an interview with SpotboyE. Ranbir Kapoor, on whose portrayed character the song is based, revealed that "Channa Mereya" is by far the best song in his entire career.

== Critical reception ==
In a Koimoi review, Surabhi Redkar describes "Channa Mereya" as the best song on the album, giving credit to lyricist Amitabh Bhattacharya for inducing immediate "exact feeling of a heartbreak" from within, noting that "a melancholic piece sung with fervour showcases Singh's tonal control", added by Suanshu Khurana of The Indian Express, which conquered Ranbir's character at that very moment, and with fusion between western instruments and Indian musical instruments, the song "stays with you long after the track is over", states Rinky Kumar of The Times of India.

"The beauty of the song is unmatched. Amitabh Bhattacharya's lyrics, Pritam's music, and Arijit Singh's voice fit like pieces of a puzzle.", writes Shalini Ojha in a NewsBytes article, and states that the song was perfect "From lyrics to music to acting", and also it's "A pathos filled song" at a festive environment, as referred by Joginder Tuteja of Bollywood Hungama. "Bhattacharya writes great, simple lines", added by Mint's editor Sankhayan Ghosh, while Shweta Parande of India.com says, "it is sad that this is the song that leads to the break-up of Ayan (Ranbir Kapoor) and Alizeh (Anushka Sharma) in Ae Dil Hai Mushkil"

== Charts ==
"Channa Mereya" is in JioSaavn's top songs of all-time list. The track peaked on the Radio Mirchi Top 20 Countdown chart, and remained on the chart for 5 months, and at the year end it was at the 9th position on Radio Mirchi Top 100 Countdown chart.

Weekly charts

Chart (2016–17)	Peak position	Reference(s)
Mirchi Top 20	1	

Year-end charts

Chart (2016)	Position	Reference(s)
Mirchi Top 100	9	

== Accolades ==
The unplugged version of the song was nominated under Critics' Choice Song of The Year category at the 9th edition of Mirchi Music Award ceremony.

Year	Award Ceremony	Category	Recipient	Reference(s)
2016	Stardust Awards	Best Lyricist	Amitabh Bhattacharya	
2016	Stardust Awards	Best Playback Singer (Male)	Arijit Singh	
2017	Filmfare Awards	Best Lyricist	Amitabh Bhattacharya	
2017	Zee Cine Awards	Song of the Year	Amitabh Bhattacharya, Pritam and Arijit Singh	
2017	IIFA Awards	Best Lyricist	Amitabh Bhattacharya	
2017	MT20Jubilee Awards	Platinum Disc	Amitabh Bhattacharya, Pritam and Arijit Singh	
2017	News18 India Movie Awards	Best Lyricist	Amitabh Bhattacharya	
2017	Mirchi Music Awards	Critics' Choice Song of The Year	Amitabh Bhattacharya, Pritam and Arijit Singh	
2017	Mirchi Music Awards	Critics' Choice Lyricist of The Year	Amitabh Bhattacharya	
2021	Mirchi Music Awards	Critics' Choice Lyricist of The Decade	Amitabh Bhattacharya	
