= M.S. Dhoni: The Untold Story (soundtrack) =

2016 soundtrack album by Amaal Mallik and Rochak Kohli

Soundtrack album by Amaal Mallik and Rochak Kohli
- Released: 5 September 2016
- Recorded: 2015
- Studios: YRF Studios, Mumbai; Future Sound of Bombay, Mumbai
- Genre: Feature film soundtrack
- Length: 38:00
- Languages: Hindi; Tamil; Telugu; Marathi
- Label: T-Series
- Producers: Amaal Mallik; Rochak Kohli; Meghdeep Bose

Amaal Mallik chronology
| Baar Baar Dekho (2016) | M.S. Dhoni: The Untold Story (2016) | Force 2 (2016) |

Rochak Kohli chronology
| Wazir (2015) | M.S. Dhoni: The Untold Story (2016) | Fugay (2016) |

Singles from M.S. Dhoni: The Untold Story
- 1. "Besabriyaan" Released: 20 July 2016; 2. "Kaun Tujhe" Released: 28 July 2016; 3. "Jab Tak" Released: 5 August 2016; 4. "Phir Kabhi" Released: 10 August 2016

M.S. Dhoni: The Untold Story is the soundtrack album to the 2016 Hindi-language film of the same name directed by Neeraj Pandey. Based on the life of former Indian cricketer MS Dhoni, the film stars Sushant Singh Rajput as Dhoni along with Disha Patani, Kiara Advani, and Anupam Kher in pivotal roles. The album consists of nine songs composed by Amaal Mallik in his first album as a solo composer, with one song being composed by Rochak Kohli as a guest composer, featuring lyrics written by Manoj Muntashir. The vocals were performed by Armaan Malik, Arijit Singh, Siddharth Basrur, Rochak Kohli, Palak Muchhal, Ananya Nanda and Adithyan A. Prithviraj. The background music was composed by Sanjoy Chowdhury.

The album was recorded entirely using live instrumentation and has only one soundscape used considering the theme of the film. After M. M. Kreem, whom collaborated with Pandey for the soundtracks: Special 26 and Baby, refused his offer on his priorities with Baahubali: The Beginning (the first film in Rajamouli's Baahubali franchise) despite composing one promotional single, Pandey chose Amaal Malik for the film soundtrack and initially recorded six songs within March—October 2015. No lip-syncing is used in the songs, as the team believed that the songs blend in the narrative. The album released in Tamil, Telugu and Marathi with the lyrics were penned by Pa. Vijay, Chaitanya Prasad and Guru Thakur for the respective languages. Out of the seven songs, a promotional track "Har Gully Mein Dhoni Hai" (also released in Tamil) and two alternate versions of the songs were used in Hindi version, while the Telugu and Marathi album have seven tracks.

The album opened to positive reviews from critics, praising Amaal Malik for using single soundscape and retaining the freshness and melody in the tracks, but criticised for the familiarity of the tunes. The tracks "Besabriyaan", "Kaun Tujhe", "Phir Kabhi" and "Har Gully Mein Dhoni Hai" received the most consumer response and Palak Muchhal, the singer of "Kaun Tujhe" received a News18 and Screen Award for Best Female Playback Singer respectively.

== Production ==
Initially Neeraj Pandey planned to rope in M. M. Kreem as the composer for the film's soundtrack, after whom the director worked with him in Special 26 (2013) and Baby (2015). Kreem also composed the promotional track "Phir Se" written by Manoj Muntashir and recorded by Divya Kumar, for the 2015 Cricket World Cup and dedicated the song to the Indian cricket team. Pandey being a cricket buff said that the idea was "to sum up the mood and emotion for the entire nation" and called the song as a "tribute to the inherent passion our players have for the country and the love we have towards our own team". Both the director and the composer worked on the song and video in short span of time so as to release the track before the tournament which begins on 14 February 2015. The song received overwhelmingly positive response and Pandey eventually planned to rope Kreem as the composer. But, Kreem's commitments on Baahubali franchise led Pandey to choose a different composer for the songs. When Pandey listened to the song "Sooraj Dooba Hain" from the film Roy (2015), Pandey eventually approached the composer of the song, Amaal Malik to work for the biopic's songs along with Bhushan Kumar, the chairman and managing director of T-Series. Malik had eventually composed two single songs for the label — "Chal Wahan Jaate Hain" and "Zindagi Aa Raha Hoon Main" — both of them featured Tiger Shroff as the lead.

Amaal Malik composed 25 songs in his film career when he was being a part of multi-composer soundtracks for films, but this was his first album as a solo composer. Initially, the team had planned for a multi-composer setup for the songs in the film, but as Amaal Malik composed the first track "Besabriyaan", the team decided to retain him as the composer for the soundtrack. Within October 2015, Malik finished composing six tracks for the film's soundtrack with three of them being romantic numbers which highlighted Dhoni's relationship with his wife Sakshi Dhoni, from the time they first meet to post marriage. Bhushan made Malik sit for nights explaining him the feel and requirement of each song in the film. The album does not have the characters lip-syncing to the songs but will play in the background as they wanted the score to complement the cricketer's image and the album was further recorded with live instruments.

Malik said that the seven songs have "fine blend of rock and orchestral elements". He explained that "The album maintains a balance between commercial and the inspirational aspect, even if one has not seen the movie, they would still be able to relate to the songs, which is why the songs work as stand-alone tracks"; also adding that the album maintains a single sort of soundscape, which he called as the "most difficult to crack", calling the film as "one of his toughest projects in his career".

== Album information ==
The track "Besabriyaan" which was the first to be composed which is about Dhoni's early life that how he juggled between studies and cricket simultaneously. The second song "Kaun Tujhe" is about the relationship with his late girlfriend Priyanka Jha, who died in a tragic accident in 2002. The third song from the film entitled "Jab Tak" is about Dhoni's first meeting with his wife Sakshi in the film. Rochak Kohli was announced as the guest composer for the film's soundtrack and composed a promotional single titled "Har Gully Mein Dhoni Hai" which is about the craze of cricket in India and public opinion about the sport. It was initially started as the theme of street cricket in India, but Kohli described the song as "a tribute to dreams and the fight to achieve the dreams". He further described the song as "a metaphor for everyone in India who has the potential to rise above their immediate realities to achieve them" and as "an emotional song that connects to everyone, in every by-lane of the country, with the hope and passion to succeed". This song was released in Tamil as "Ulagam Engum Dhoni Ye" sung by S. P. Charan and lyrics written by Pa. Vijay. However, it was not featured in the Telugu and Marathi versions of the soundtracks. The promotional song "Phir Se" which was made by M. M. Kreem for the 2015 Cricket World Cup was not included in the film.

== Reception ==
Writing for The Times of India, Rinky Kumar gave the soundtrack album a rating 3 out of 5 adding: "the album has a mixed bag of tracks, some of which make quite an impression and while others are nothing to write home about". Surabhi Redkar of Koimoi also rated 3 out of 5, calling the album as "quite decent" and praised Amaal Malik for a "great effort in his first solo album". Writing for India Today, Devarsi Ghosh added that: "the album has a few stock market-friendly hit-gaana type numbers, every once in a while, Amaal tries to move away from monotony and do something interesting". Critic based at Daily News and Analysis praised Amaal Malik for the use of live instruments in the film's soundtrack, calling it as "a more full-blooded feel", and further added that "the album has a couple of snags, but that could not stop the album's winning inning".

Joginder Tuteja of Bollywood Hungama rated the album 4.5 out of 5 saying "The music of M.S. Dhoni is good and there is nothing unlikeable about it. Though one doesn't expect the music to become chartbuster from a long term musical experience, in the context of the film most of them should fit in well." Devesh Sharma of Filmfare gave a 4 out of 5 rating to the soundtrack saying "Amaal Mallik makes his mark as a solo music director". A critic from India.com said that "there is some not-so-wow kind of songs too, but the album will still be liked – thanks to the soft romantic tracks". Manish Gaekwad of Scroll.in called that "Mallik has a hit strike rate with the mushy numbers, but he has his work cut out for him if he wants to diversify into other styles". Critic Gaurang Chauhan of BollywoodLife.com said that the album has "quite a few hummable tunes to it" and called the album as a "must listen for all the romantic hearts". A critic from Behindwoods gave the album 3 out of 5 calling it as "an impressive album which stays perfectly true to the film's genre". Vipin Nair of Music Aloud criticised the soundtrack saying it as "the album is largely marred by the familiarity in its tunes", with a rating of 2.5 out of 5. Megha Mathur of The Quint opined that "Amaal Mallik's compositions are not as dynamic or disruptive as the film's protagonist, despite few long lasting melodies". She further called that "The OST falls short of making the biopic a spectacular experience".

== Track listing ==
=== Hindi ===
All lyrics are written by Manoj Muntashir.

| No. | Title | Music | Singer(s) | Length |
|---|---|---|---|---|
| 1. | "Besabriyaan" | Amaal Mallik | Armaan Malik | 4:15 |
| 2. | "Kaun Tujhe" | Amaal Mallik | Palak Muchhal | 4:01 |
| 3. | "Jab Tak" | Amaal Mallik | Armaan Malik | 2:54 |
| 4. | "Phir Kabhi" | Amaal Mallik | Arijit Singh | 4:47 |
| 5. | "Parwah Nahin" | Amaal Mallik | Siddharth Basrur | 4:02 |
| 6. | "Jab Tak" (Redux) | Amaal Mallik | Armaan Malik | 3:38 |
| 7. | "Padhoge Likhoge" | Amaal Mallik | Ananya Nanda, Adithyan A. Prithviraj | 3:07 |
| 8. | "Har Gully Mein Dhoni Hai" | Rochak Kohli | Rochak Kohli | 4:04 |
| 9. | "Phir Kabhi" (Reprise) | Amaal Mallik | Arijit Singh | 4:33 |
| 10. | "Kaun Tujhe" (Armaan Malik Version) | Amaal Mallik | Armaan Malik | 2:39 |
| Total length: | | | | 38:00 |

=== Tamil ===
All lyrics are written by Pa. Vijay.

| No. | Title | Music | Singer(s) | Length |
|---|---|---|---|---|
| 1. | "Poraadalaam" | Amaal Mallik | Armaan Malik | 4:16 |
| 2. | "Unnal Unnal Un Ninaival" | Amaal Mallik | Palak Muchhal | 4:03 |
| 3. | "Konjam" (Version 1) | Amaal Mallik | Armaan Malik | 2:53 |
| 4. | "Pogalaam" | Amaal Mallik | Sreerama Chandra | 4:44 |
| 5. | "Bayama Enna" | Amaal Mallik | Siddharth Basrur | 4:02 |
| 6. | "Konjam" (Version 2) | Amaal Mallik | Armaan Malik | 3:38 |
| 7. | "Padichu Kizhichu" | Amaal Mallik | Aparnaa Bhaagwat, Adithyan A. Prithviraj | 3:07 |
| 8. | "Ulagam Engum Dhoni Ye" | Rochak Kohli | S. P. B. Charan | 4:04 |
| Total length: | | | | 30:50 |

=== Telugu ===
All lyrics are written by Chaitanya Prasad.

| No. | Title | Music | Singer(s) | Length |
|---|---|---|---|---|
| 1. | "Le Padha Padhaa" | Amaal Mallik | Armaan Malik | 4:15 |
| 2. | "Ninnevarinka Premisthaaru" | Amaal Mallik | Palak Muchhal | 4:03 |
| 3. | "Nuvve Pranayaagni Lo" | Amaal Mallik | Armaan Malik | 2:54 |
| 4. | "Mari Maree" | Amaal Mallik | Sreerama Chandra | 4:47 |
| 5. | "Pharwaaledhu" | Amaal Mallik | Siddharth Basrur | 4:02 |
| 6. | "Ninne Tholi Prema Lo" | Amaal Mallik | Armaan Malik | 3:40 |
| 7. | "Chadhivithe Jagathike" | Amaal Mallik | Aparnaa Bhaagwat, Adithyan A. Prithviraj | 3:08 |
| Total length: | | | | 26:47 |

=== Marathi ===
All lyrics are written by Guru Thakur.

| No. | Title | Music | Singer(s) | Length |
|---|---|---|---|---|
| 1. | "Ghe Dhyas Ha" | Amaal Mallik | Sangeet Haldipur | 4:15 |
| 2. | "Shravasatun Tu Darvalta" | Amaal Mallik | Palak Muchhal | 4:03 |
| 3. | "Ashich Thaamb Na Jara" (Version 1) | Amaal Mallik | Sangeet Haldipur | 2:54 |
| 4. | "Dhundicha Kshan Ha Ola" | Amaal Mallik | Sreerama Chandra | 4:47 |
| 5. | "Parwah Nahi" | Amaal Mallik | Siddharth Basrur | 4:02 |
| 6. | "Ashich Thaamb Na Jara" (Version 2) | Amaal Mallik | Sangeet Haldipur | 3:40 |
| 7. | "Hoshil Nawab" | Amaal Mallik | Aparnaa Bhaagwat, Adithyan A. Prithviraj | 3:08 |
| Total length: | | | | 26:47 |

== Release history ==
| Album | Region | Release date | Format | Ref |
|---|---|---|---|---|
| M.S. Dhoni: The Untold Story (Original) | Worldwide | 24 August 2016 | Digital download; streaming | |
| M.S. Dhoni: The Untold Story (Original) | India | 26 September 2016 | CD | |
| M.S. Dhoni: The Untold Story (Original) | United States | 9 October 2016 | CD | |
| M.S. Dhoni: The Untold Story (Original) | United Kingdom | 23 October 2016 | CD | |
| M.S. Dhoni: The Untold Story (Original) | United Kingdom | 14 January 2017 | Vinyl | |
| M.S. Dhoni: The Untold Story (Tamil) | Worldwide | 7 September 2016 | Digital download; streaming | |
| M.S. Dhoni: The Untold Story (Telugu) | Worldwide | 14 September 2016 | Digital download; streaming | |
| M.S. Dhoni: The Untold Story (Marathi) | Worldwide | 16 September 2016 | Digital download; streaming | |

== Chart performance ==
Weekly charts

| Chart (2016–17) | Song | Peak position | Reference(s) |
|---|---|---|---|
| Radio Mirchi Top 20 | "Besabriyaan" | 2 | |
| Radio Mirchi Top 20 | "Jab Tak" | 3 | |
| Radio Mirchi Top 20 | "Kaun Tujhe" | 3 | |
| Radio Mirchi Top 20 | "Phir Kabhi" | 8 | |

Year-end charts

| Chart (2016) | Song | Position | Reference(s) |
|---|---|---|---|
| Radio Mirchi Top 100 | "Jab Tak" | 7 | |
| Radio Mirchi Top 100 | "Besabriyaan" | 17 | |
| Radio Mirchi Top 100 | "Kaun Tujhe" | 24 | |
| Radio Mirchi Top 100 | "Phir Kabhi" | 28 | |

== Accolades ==
| Award (Note: Awards, festivals and organizations are in alphabetical order.) | Date of ceremony (Note: Date is linked to the article about the awards held that year, wherever possible.) | Category | Recipient(s) | Result | Ref. |
|---|---|---|---|---|---|
| BIG ZEE Entertainment Awards | 29 July 2017 | Most Entertaining Singer (Female) | Palak Muchhal – (for "Kaun Tujhe") | Nominated | |
| Filmfare Awards | 14 January 2017 | Best Female Playback Singer | Palak Muchhal – (for "Kaun Tujhe") | Nominated | |
| International Indian Film Academy Awards | 14–15 July 2017 | Best Music Director | Amaal Mallik | Nominated | |
| International Indian Film Academy Awards | 14–15 July 2017 | Best Male Playback Singer | Armaan Malik – (for "Besabriyaan") | Nominated | |
| News18 Movie Awards | 20 March 2017 | Best Playback Singer (Female) | Palak Muchhal – (for "Kaun Tujhe") | Won | |
| Screen Awards | 4 December 2016 | Best Female Playback Singer | Palak Muchhal – (for "Kaun Tujhe") | Won | |
| Stardust Awards | 21 December 2016 | Best Music Director | Amaal Mallik | Nominated | |
| Stardust Awards | 21 December 2016 | Best Female Playback Singer | Palak Muchhal – (for "Kaun Tujhe") | Nominated | |

== Personnel ==
Credits adapted from CD liner notes

- Amaal Mallik – Composer (All tracks), musical arrangements (All tracks)
- Meghdeep Bose – Music producer (Track 1,2,3,10), acoustic guitar (Track 1,2,10)
- Sourav Roy – Music producer (Track 4)
- Keshav Dhar – Music producer (Track 5), electric guitar (Track 5)
- Ankur Mukherjee – Music producer (Track 5), acoustic guitar (Track 1,2,6,10), live guitar (Track 4), ukulele (Track 4)
- Jim Sathya – Music producer (Track 6)
- Aditya Dev – Music producer (Track 7)
- Rochak Kohli – Music producer (Track 8)
- Joell Mukherji – Music producer (Track 9), acoustic guitar (Track 9), electric guitar (Track 9)
- Armaan Malik – Acoustic guitar (Track 4), electric guitar (Track 5)
- Dev Arijit – Acoustic guitar (Track 8)
- Mohit Dogra – Acoustic guitar (Track 8)
- Rushad Mistry – Bass guitar (Track 1,6)
- Jeeni Dutta – Electric guitar (Track 5)
- Jai Row Kavi – Drums (Track 5)
- Sivamani – Drums (Track 8), percussions (Track 8)
- Firoz Khan – Keys (Track 8)
- Krishna Jhaveri – Bass (Track 5)
- Omkar Dhumal – Shehnai (Track 7)
- Tejas Vinchurkar – Flute (Track 1,2,10), Woodwinds (Track 1)
- Suresh Lalwani – Strings (CMA Musicians, Mumbai) [Track 1,3]
- Dipesh Varma – Live rhythm (Track 7), live percussions (Track 7)
- Daboo Malik – Live rhythm (Track 7), live percussions (Track 7)
- Omkar Salunkhe – Live rhythm (Track 7)
- Keyur Barve – Live rhythm (Track 7)
- Amey Londhe – Vocal recording (Audio Garage, Mumbai) [Track 1,5]
- Vincent Joseph – Vocal recording (Audio Garage, Mumbai) [Track 1,5]
- Surajit Ghoshmazumdar – Vocal recording (T-Series Studios, Mumbai) [Track 2]
- Rahul Sharma – Vocal recording (Asia Music Vision, Mumbai) [Track 4]
- Akshay Kamat – Vocal recording (RK Music Labs, Mumbai) [Track 8], music assistance
- Vijay Dayal – Live instrumentation recording (YRF Studios, Mumbai) [Track 1,2,6,10], vocal recording (YRF Studios, Mumbai) [Track 3,6,10]
- Chinmay Mestry – Live instrumentation recording (YRF Studios, Mumbai) [Track 1,2,6,10], vocal recording (YRF Studios, Mumbai) [Track 3,6,10]
- Shantanu Hudlikar – Live instrumentation recording (YRF Studios, Mumbai) [Track 1,3,5]
- Abhishek Khandelwal – Live instrumentation recording (YRF Studios, Mumbai) [Track 1,3,5]
- Manasi Tare – Live instrumentation recording (YRF Studios, Mumbai) [Track 1,3,5]
- Julian Mascarenhas – Live instrumentation recording (Enzy Studios, Mumbai) [Track 4,8]
- Eric Pillai – Audio mixing (Future Sound of Bombay, Mumbai) [All tracks], mastering (Future Sound of Bombay, Mumbai) [All tracks]
- Bharat Goel – Audio mixing (Global Sound Labs, Mumbai) [Track 8], mastering (Global Sound Labs, Mumbai) [Track 8]
- Ninad Lad – Audio mixing (Orbis Studio, Mumbai) [Track 9], live instrumentation recording (Orbis Studio, Mumbai) [Track 9]
- Donal Whelan – Audio mastering (Mastering World, London) [Track 9]
- Michael Edwin Pillai – Mixing assistance (Future Sound of Bombay, Mumbai)
- Shayan Chakraborty – Mixing assistance (Orbis Studio, Mumbai)
- Krish Trivedi – Music assistance
- Sid 'Sky' Singh – Music assistance
- Yash Narvekar – Music assistance
- Zaid Patni – Music assistance
- Shishir A Samant – Music assistance
- Gaurav Sanghvi – Music assistance
- Anvay Patil – Music assistance
- Rujul Deolikar – Music assistance
