= Roy (soundtrack) =

2015 soundtrack album

Soundtrack album by Amaal Mallik, Ankit Tiwari and Meet Bros Anjjan
- Released: 14 January 2015
- Studio: 2014
- Genre: Feature film soundtrack
- Length: 34:18
- Language: Hindi
- Label: T-Series
- Producer: Bhushan Kumar

Amaal Mallik chronology
Khoobsurat (2014)	Roy (2015)	Ek Paheli Leela (2015)

Ankit Tiwari chronology
Khamoshiyan (2014)	Roy (2015)	Mr. X (2015)

Meet Bros Anjjan chronology
Baby (2015)	Roy (2015)	Tanu Weds Manu Returns (2015)

Singles from Roy
- 1. "Sooraj Dooba Hain" Released: 24 December 2014

Roy is the soundtrack album to the 2015 film of the same name. The album featured seven songs composed by Amaal Mallik, Ankit Tiwari and Meet Bros Anjjan, with lyrics written by Kumaar, Sandeep Nath and Abhendra Kumar Upadhyay. Sanjoy Chowdhury composed the film score. The seven-song soundtrack was released through T-Series on 14 January 2015, after being preceded by the lead single "Sooraj Dooba Hain" which released on 24 December 2014.

The music was chart-topping commercial success and received positive reviews for its assortment and compositions, though some were critical of the repetitive nature in the songs, in comparison with most of the albums produced by the label which opted for familiar associations. The album received three Mirchi Music Awards, two awards each at Filmfare, Global Indian Music Academy and one each at International Indian Film Academy, Screen, Producers Guild, Times of India and Zee Cine Awards.

== Background ==
Bhushan Kumar returned to creating a multi-composer album for Roy, something that T-Series did with the soundtracks of Aashiqui 2 (2013) and Yaariyan (2014). Kumar admitted that each track in the album "have an individuality of their own and helps the story go forward".

Kumar discussed with Amaal Mallik on creating a youthful party number for the film, for which Mallik had finalized a rough version of "Sooraj Dooba Hain" which he composed three years ago and was rejected by other film producers, before Kumar showed interest on using the song in the film, which Mallik being unaware of. Kumaar then wrote the lyrics after the tune was finalized, and the vocals were recorded by Arijit Singh and Aditi Singh Sharma.

Meet Bros Anjjan (Note: musical project that consists of the duo Meet Bros (Manmeet and Harmeet Singh) and singer-songwriter Anjjan Bhattacharya) composed the dance number "Chittiyaan Kalaiyaan" with Kanika Kapoor providing the vocals; they previously collaborated for the 2014 hit number "Baby Doll". The rest of the songs were composed by Ankit Tiwari, who had tuned three original tracks. "Yaara Re" crooned by KK, is a song about longing, pictured on the lead pair Arjun Rampal and Jacqueline Fernandez, where "the man realising that he is losing the one he has loved", whereas "Tu Hai Ki Nahi" is picturized on Ranbir Kapoor and Fernandez. He described the song, as a relaxed number, where "the hero is confident of own his feelings but is uncertain of how the heroine thinks of him". Tiwari infused a whistle tune for the song as the opening theme and interludes. "Boond Boond" is an erotic number pictured on Rampal and Fernandez, which was sung by Tiwari himself.

== Release ==
On 19 December 2014, the music video for the song "Sooraj Dooba Hain" was released with the song itself later released as a digital single, five days later. On 24 December, the second song "Tu Hai Ki Nahi" was released as a music video. The music video for "Chittyaan Kalaiyaan" was released on 8 January 2015. The soundtrack was released digitally on 14 January 2015. After the album's release, music videos for "Boond Boond" and "Yaara Re" were released on 16 and 25 January.

== Reception ==
"We were bullish about the music from day one because we knew we had a good album in hand. I'm happy that our conviction has paid off."

— Bhushan Kumar, on the success of the album

Joginder Tuteja of Rediff.com awarded the album with 4 out of 5 stars and called it "a winner all the way". Kasmin Fernandes of The Times of India called it as "an album that is equal parts soulful and peppy" and rated 3.5 out of 5. Bollywood Hungama's Rajiv Vijayakar rated 4 out of 5, summarizing "The same package of multiple composers that anoint so many films comes in, though with some decent lyrics in two cases [...] Some of the songs can be interchangeable with other films in their general tenor and words. However, they might help the movie's appeal initially and so the rating, as always, is based on this consideration." described it as a "highly listenable, multi-composer soundtrack".

In contrast, Sankhayan Ghosh of The Indian Express, awarded 2 out of 5 stars, stating "Roy rehashes every trick in the book that ensured these successes — deploying the same artistes and recreating what has worked for them in the past." Rucha Sharma from Daily News and Analysis called it as "a run of the mill album, except the song Sooraj Dooba Hai currently burning the dance floor" and rated 2.5 out of 5.

== Track listing ==
No.	Title	Lyrics	Music	Singer(s)	Length
1.	"Sooraj Dooba Hain Yaaron"	Kumaar	Amaal Mallik	Arijit Singh, Aditi Singh Sharma	4:24
2.	"Tu Hai Ki Nahi"	Abhendra Kumar Upadhyay	Ankit Tiwari	Ankit Tiwari	5:33
3.	"Chittiyaan Kalaiyaan"	Kumaar	Meet Bros Anjjan	Kanika Kapoor, Meet Bros Anjjan	4:05
4.	"Yaara Re"	Sandeep Nath	Ankit Tiwari	KK	4:57
5.	"Boond Boond"	Abhendra Kumar Upadhyay	Ankit Tiwari	Ankit Tiwari	5:21
6.	"Tu Hai Ki Nahi" (Unplugged)	Abhendra Kumar Upadhyay	Ankit Tiwari	Tulsi Kumar	5:34
7.	"Sooraj Dooba Hain"	Kumaar	Amaal Mallik	Aditi Singh Sharma, Arijit Singh	4:24
Total length:					34:18

== Remix album ==
Roy

Remix album by Ankit Tiwari, Amaal Mallik, Meet Bros Anjjan
- Released: 28 January 2015
- Studio: 2015
- Length: 34:18
- Language: Hindi
- Label: T-Series
- Producer: Bhushan Kumar

On 28 January 2015, T-Series released a remix album consisting of the remixes produced for the original songs. In the album, "Chittiyaan Kalaiyaan" has two remix versions.

Track listing
No.	Title	Lyrics	Music	Singer(s)	Length
1.	"Sooraj Dooba Hain Yaaron" (Remix)	Kumaar	Amaal Mallik	Arijit Singh, Aditi Singh Sharma	4:35
2.	"Tu Hai Ki Nahi" (Remix)	Abhendra Kumar Upadhyay	Ankit Tiwari	Ankit Tiwari	3:25
3.	"Chittiyaan Kalaiyaan" (MBA Swag)	Kumaar	Meet Bros Anjjan	Kanika Kapoor, Meet Bros Anjjan	3:31
4.	"Boond Boond" (Remix)	Abhendra Kumar Upadhyay	Ankit Tiwari	Ankit Tiwari	4:19
5.	"Yaara Re" (Remix)	Sandeep Nath	Ankit Tiwari	KK	5:19
6.	"Chittiyaan Kalaiyaan" (Electro Mix)	Kumaar	Meet Bros Anjjan	Kanika Kapoor, Meet Bros Anjjan	4:39

== Accolades ==
Award	Date of Ceremony (Note: Date is linked to the article about the awards held that year, wherever possible.)	Category	Recipients	Result	Ref.
Filmfare Awards	15 January 2016	Best Music Director	Amaal Mallik, Ankit Tiwari and Meet Bros Anjjan	Won	
Filmfare Awards	15 January 2016	Best Lyricist	Kumaar – ("Sooraj Dooba Hain Yaaron")	Nominated	
Filmfare Awards	15 January 2016	Best Male Playback Singer	Arijit Singh – ("Sooraj Dooba Hain")	Won	
Filmfare Awards	15 January 2016	Best Male Playback Singer	Ankit Tiwari – ("Tu Hai Ki Nahi')	Nominated	
Global Indian Music Academy Awards	6 April 2016	Best Film Album	Roy – Amaal Mallik, Ankit Tiwari and Meet Bros Anjjan	Won	
Global Indian Music Academy Awards	6 April 2016	Best Film Song	"Sooraj Dooba Hain Yaaron" – Amaal Mallik, Kumaar, Arijit Singh and Aditi Singh Sharma	Nominated	
Global Indian Music Academy Awards	6 April 2016	Best Music Director	Amaal Mallik, Ankit Tiwari and Meet Bros Anjjan	Won	
Global Indian Music Academy Awards	6 April 2016	Best Lyricist	Kumaar – ("Sooraj Dooba Hain Yaaron")	Nominated	
Global Indian Music Academy Awards	6 April 2016	Best Male Playback Singer	Arijit Singh – ("Sooraj Dooba Hain Yaaron")	Nominated	
Global Indian Music Academy Awards	6 April 2016	Best Playback Singer – Female	Kanika Kapoor – ("Chittiyaan Kalaiyaan")	Nominated	
International Indian Film Academy Awards	26 June 2016	Best Music Direction	Amaal Mallik, Ankit Tiwari and Meet Bros Anjjan	Won	
International Indian Film Academy Awards	26 June 2016	Best Playback Singer – Female	Kanika Kapoor – ("Chittiyaan Kalaiyaan")	Nominated	
International Indian Film Academy Awards	26 June 2016	Best Playback Singer – Male	Arijit Singh – ("Sooraj Dooba Hain Yaaron")	Nominated	
Mirchi Music Awards	29 February 2016	Song of the Year	"Sooraj Dooba Hain Yaaron" – Amaal Mallik, Kumaar, Arijit Singh and Aditi Singh Sharma	Nominated	
Mirchi Music Awards	29 February 2016	Album of the Year	Roy – Amaal Mallik, Ankit Tiwari and Meet Bros Anjjan	Nominated	
Mirchi Music Awards	29 February 2016	Listeners' Choice Album of the Year	Roy – Amaal Mallik, Ankit Tiwari and Meet Bros Anjjan	Won	
Mirchi Music Awards	29 February 2016	Music Composer of the Year	Amaal Mallik – ("Sooraj Dooba Hain Yaaron")	Nominated	
Mirchi Music Awards	29 February 2016	Male Vocalist of the Year	Arijit Singh – ("Sooraj Dooba Hain Yaaron")	Nominated	
Mirchi Music Awards	29 February 2016	Upcoming Composer of The Year	Amaal Mallik – ("Sooraj Dooba Hain Yaaron")	Won	
Mirchi Music Awards	29 February 2016	Upcoming Lyricist of The Year	Abhendra Kumar Upadhyay – ("Boond Boond")	Won	
Mirchi Music Awards	29 February 2016	Upcoming Lyricist of The Year	Abhendra Kumar Upadhyay – ("Tu Hai Ki Nahi")	Nominated	
Producers Guild Film Awards	1 January 2016	Best Music Director	Amaal Mallik, Ankit Tiwari and Meet Bros Anjjan	Won	
Producers Guild Film Awards	1 January 2016	Best Lyricist	Kumaar – ("Sooraj Dooba Hain Yaaron")	Nominated	
Producers Guild Film Awards	1 January 2016	Best Male Playback Singer	Arijit Singh – ("Sooraj Dooba Hain Yaaron")	Nominated	
Producers Guild Film Awards	1 January 2016	Best Male Playback Singer	Ankit Tiwari – ("Tu Hai Ki Nahi")	Nominated	
Producers Guild Film Awards	1 January 2016	Best Female Playback Singer	Kanika Kapoor – ("Chittiyaan Kalaiyaan")	Nominated	
Screen Awards	8 January 2016	Best Music Director	Amaal Mallik, Ankit Tiwari and Meet Bros Anjjan	Won	
Times of India Film Awards	18 March 2016	Best Music Album	Roy – Amaal Mallik, Ankit Tiwari and Meet Bros Anjjan	Won	
Zee Cine Awards	20 February 2016	Best Music	Amaal Mallik – ("Sooraj Dooba Hain Yaaron")	Nominated	
Zee Cine Awards	20 February 2016	Best Playback Singer – Male	Arijit Singh – ("Sooraj Dooba Hain Yaaron")	Won	
