= Kapoor & Sons (soundtrack) =

2016 soundtrack album

Soundtrack album by Amaal Mallik, Badshah, Tanishk Bagchi, Arko, Benny Dayal and Nucleya
- Released: 16 March 2016
- Genre: Feature film soundtrack
- Length: 18:14
- Language: Hindi
- Label: Sony Music India

Singles from Kapoor & Sons
- 1. "Kar Gayi Chull" Released: 18 February 2016; 2. "Bolna" Released: 24 February 2016

Kapoor & Sons is the soundtrack album to the 2016 film of the same name directed by Shakun Batra and produced by Dharma Productions starring Rishi Kapoor, Sidharth Malhotra, Fawad Khan, Alia Bhatt, Ratna Pathak Shah and Rajat Kapoor. The film score is composed by Sameer Uddin, with the soundtrack featuring five songs composed by Amaal Mallik, Badshah, Tanishk Bagchi, Arko, Benny Dayal and Nucleya. and lyrics written by Badshah, Kumaar, Manoj Muntashir, Dr. Devendra Kafir, and Abhiruchi Chand.

The soundtrack preceded by two singles, was released under the Sony Music India label on 4 March 2016. The album was met with mixed response from music critics, who were dismissive of including multiple composers in an album and noted the repetitive tunes from the composer's previous works. Despite that, the album received three Mirchi Music Awards, and other accolades.

== Release ==
The first single "Kar Gayi Chull", a party number, was released on 18 February 2016. The song was composed by Amaal Mallik with lyrics written by Kumaar and sung by Sukriti Kakkar, Neha Kakkar and Fazilpuria; Badshah wrote, produced and performed the rap portions. The romantic number "Bolna" was released as the second single on 24 February 2016. It was performed by Arijit Singh and Asees Kaur, composed by Tanishk Bagchi with the lyrics of Dr. Devender Kafir. Bagchi had modified one of his compositions, in order to create a folk romantic number. The remaining songs were released along with the soundtrack on 4 March 2016 under the Sony Music India label.

== Reception ==
Mohar Basu, in his review for The Times of India, disliked the idea of multiple composers, "as the rhythm of one song doesn't connect with the other" making it "ordinary". He mentioned "Kar Gayi Chull" as the only well-composed song of the album. Swetha Ramakrishnan, journalist of Firstpost mentioned that the adapted songs of the film hadn't brought a new thing to the table except for the slight change of lyrics. She, however, praised Arko's "Saathi Re" and felt that other songs of the album are forgettable. Rohit Mehrotra of The Quint, giving the album one and a half star, said the album has nothing new to offer.

In contrast, Aelina Kapoor of Rediff.com stated "While the music of Kapoor & Sons holds on well, one waits to hear a soundtrack like 2 States or Yeh Jawaani Hai Deewani from the house of Dharma Productions." Karthik Srinivasan of Milliblog praised it as a "highly listenable multi-composer soundtrack" despite its recreations.

== Track listing ==
No.	Title	Lyrics	Music	Singer(s)	Length
1.	"Kar Gayi Chull"	Badshah, Kumaar	Badshah, Amaal Mallik	Badshah, Fazilpuria, Sukriti Kakar, Neha Kakkar	3:07
2.	"Bolna"	Dr. Devender Kafir	Tanishk Bagchi	Arijit Singh, Asees Kaur	3:33
3.	"Buddhu Sa Mann"	Abhiruchi Chand	Amaal Mallik	Armaan Malik	3:26
4.	"Saathi Rey"	Manoj Muntashir	Arko	Arko	4:32
5.	"Let's Nacho"	Kumaar, Christopher Pradeep	Nucleya, Benny Dayal	Badshah, Benny Dayal	3:35
Total length:					18:14

== Awards and nominations ==
Award	Date of ceremony (Note: Date is linked to the article about the awards held that year, wherever possible.)	Category	Recipient(s) and nominee(s)	Result	Ref.
Stardust Awards	19 December 2016	Best Music Album	Sony Music India	Nominated	
Filmfare Awards	14 January 2017	Best Music Director	Amaal Mallik, Badshah, Arko Pravo Mukherjee, Tanishk Bagchi, Benny Dayal, Nucleya	Nominated	
Filmfare Awards	14 January 2017	Best Background Score	Sameer Uddin	Won	
Mirchi Music Awards	18 February 2017	Album of the Year	Amaal Mallik, Arko Pravo Mukherjee, Nucleya, Tanishk Bagchi	Nominated	
Mirchi Music Awards	18 February 2017	Male Vocalist of the Year	Arijit Singh – "Bolna"	Nominated	
Mirchi Music Awards	18 February 2017	Upcoming Female Vocalist of the Year	Asees Kaur – "Bolna"	Won	
Mirchi Music Awards	18 February 2017	Upcoming Music Composer of The Year	Tanishk Bagchi – "Bolna"	Won	
Mirchi Music Awards	18 February 2017	Upcoming Lyricist of The Year	Abhiruchi Chand – "Buddhu Sa Mann"	Won	
Big Zee Entertainment Awards	19 August 2017	Most Entertaining Music	Amaal Mallik, Badshah, Arko, Tanishk Bagchi, Benny Dayal, Nucleya	Nominated	
Big Zee Entertainment Awards	19 August 2017	Most Entertaining Song	"Kar Gayi Chull"	Nominated	
Big Zee Entertainment Awards	19 August 2017	Most Entertaining Singer (Male)	Arijit Singh (for the song "Bolna")	Nominated	
Big Zee Entertainment Awards	19 August 2017	Most Entertaining Singer (Female)	Asees Kaur (for the song "Bolna")	Nominated	
Zee Cine Awards	11 March 2017	Song of the Year	"Kar Gayi Chull"	Nominated	
