= Main Rahoon Ya Na Rahoon =

2015 song by Armaan Malik

Single by Armaan Malik
- Released: 24 November 2015
- Genre: pop
- Length: 5:10 (Single); 6:47 (Music video)
- Label: T-Series
- Composer: Amaal Mallik
- Lyricist: Rashmi Virag
- Producers: Bhushan Kumar; Amaal Mallik

"Main Rahoon Ya Na Rahoon" is a 2015 song by Indian recording artist Armaan Malik, composed by Amaal Mallik. The accompanying music video has been shot in Goa, India and features Bollywood actors Emraan Hashmi, Esha Gupta and Abhinav Shukla. It was released on YouTube by T-Series on 24 November 2015. The song has received over 350 million views on YouTube.

== Accolades ==
The song won the award for Best Indie Pop Song at the 2016 Mirchi Music Awards. It was also awarded the Best Music Video at the sixth Global Indian Music Academy Awards.
