= Kapoor & Sons =

2016 Indian film by Shakun Batra

Kapoor & Sons (Since 1921)
- Theatrical release poster
- Directed by: Shakun Batra
- Written by: Shakun Batra; Ayesha Devitre Dhillon
- Produced by: Hiroo Yash Johar; Karan Johar; Apoorva Mehta
- Starring: Rishi Kapoor; Sidharth Malhotra; Fawad Khan; Alia Bhatt; Ratna Pathak Shah; Rajat Kapoor
- Cinematography: Donald McAlpine (Credited as Jeffery F. Bierman)
- Edited by: Shivkumar V. Panicker
- Music by: Songs: Amaal Mallik; Badshah; Arko; Tanishk Bagchi; Benny Dayal; Nucleya; Score: Sameer Uddin
- Production company: Dharma Productions
- Distributed by: Fox Star Studios
- Release date: 18 March 2016
- Running time: 140 minutes
- Country: India
- Language: Hindi
- Budget: ₹28 crore
- Box office: est. ₹148 crore

Kapoor & Sons, also known as Kapoor & Sons (Since 1921), is a 2016 Indian Hindi language family comedy drama film directed by Shakun Batra and produced by Hiroo Yash Johar, Karan Johar and Apoorva Mehta under Dharma Productions, with Fox Star Studios serving as distributor and co-producer. Exploring themes of a dysfunctional family, the film stars Rishi Kapoor, Sidharth Malhotra, Fawad Khan, Alia Bhatt, Ratna Pathak Shah and Rajat Kapoor. Marking the second collaboration between Malhotra and Bhatt after their debut together in Student of the Year (2012) and Mehta's first film to credit as a producer, the film follows two estranged brothers who return to their dysfunctional family after their grandfather suffers a cardiac arrest.

Made on a budget of ₹280 million, Kapoor & Sons released in cinemas on 18 March 2016 and earned ₹1.48 billion worldwide, and was declared a blockbuster at the box office. It received high critical acclaim from both Indian and international critics.

At the 62nd Filmfare Awards, Kapoor & Sons received 8 nominations, including Best Film, Best Director (Batra) and Best Supporting Actress (Pathak Shah), and won 5 awards with Rishi Kapoor winning Best Supporting Actor over his co-stars and fellow nominees Khan and Rajat Kapoor. The film is available on Netflix and Amazon Prime Video.

== Plot ==
Estranged brothers Rahul and Arjun Kapoor are compelled to return to their childhood home in Coonoor when their 90-year-old grandfather Amarjeet suffers a heart attack. Rahul is a successful novelist and entrepreneur based in London who appears to be the most mature in the family. On the other hand, Arjun struggles to get his books published, resorting to working part-time as a bartender in New Jersey to make ends meet and write in his spare time. Their parents, Harsh and especially Sunita, favor Rahul for being successful, which upsets Arjun. While the brothers struggle to get along, their parents grapple with their own troubled marriage. Harsh is unsupportive of Sunita's desire to open a catering business, and his past extramarital affair with former office colleague Anu has blemished their relationship. While recovering in the hospital, Amarjeet professes his last wish is to take a family photograph titled "Kapoor & Sons, since 1921".

Sunita finds out Harsh has broken her fixed deposit to pay some bank loans and feels cheated, as she had been saving money to start her catering business. They get into an argument, which soon involves both brothers. Arjun leaves the house in the heat of the moment and goes to a party to divert his mind, where he befriends and becomes attracted to the homeowner, a young and free-spirited woman named Tia Malik. While surveying her property, Rahul also meets Tia the next day, and the two go out for dinner. Rahul drops her home, and to his surprise, Tia kisses him spontaneously. Later on a date with Tia, Arjun tells her he suspects Rahul of plagiarizing his idea to write his bestselling novel with similar characters and subplots but a different ending. Arjun has never confronted Rahul to avoid causing another rift in the family. After the date, Tia confides in her friend that she has feelings for Arjun and regrets kissing Rahul.

The brothers throw a party to celebrate Amarjeet's birthday. Arjun discovers Tia and Rahul know each other and fears they have feelings for each other, but Rahul clarifies he is already in a committed relationship in London. Problems arise when the family finds out Harsh invited Anu, leading to another argument which ends the party, though it is later revealed that it was Rahul's idea to invite Anu. Harsh and Sunita later reminisce about how happy they were, and Harsh apologizes to her. On her birthday, Tia discloses to Arjun that she lost her parents on her 13th birthday in a plane crash. They had gone to Canada for her uncle's surgery and missed her birthday. She regrets her last phone conversation with her parents, where she told them never to return.

The family tries to fulfill Amarjeet's wish to take a family photo, but various secrets come to light that day. Rahul discovers his father was lying about having ended his affair with Anu, while Sunita discovers the relationship Rahul has in London is actually with another man. Tia tells Arjun what happened between her and Rahul, and the family photo is interrupted when Sunita walks away angrily. Harsh tries to talk to her, but when she doesn't listen, he gets into his car and drives away to calm down. Arjun later finds out Rahul has been reading his latest manuscript and confronts him. Sunita interrupts and admits to Arjun she gave his first manuscript to Rahul, thinking Arjun was not serious about becoming an author. After calming down, Sunita gives Harsh a call. Harsh tries to pick up the phone while driving and gets hit by a truck because he was not paying attention to the road. He dies as a result of his injuries, devastating the family. After the funeral, Rahul confirms the gender of his partner to Arjun and the two leave for London and New York, respectively. Four months later, the brothers receive a video message from Amarjeet, requesting them to return, as he feels alone. Sunita comes to terms with Rahul's sexuality. Arjun's book is ready to be published, and he reconnects with Tia. They finally take the family photo Amarjeet wanted, with a cutout of Harsh in his memory.

== Cast ==
- Rishi Kapoor as Amarjeet Kapoor
- Sidharth Malhotra as Arjun Kapoor
- Fawad Khan as Rahul Kapoor
- Alia Bhatt as Tia Malik
- Ratna Pathak Shah as Sunita Kapoor
- Rajat Kapoor as Harsh Kapoor
- Anahita Uberoi as Neetu Kapoor
- Riya Vij as Soumya Parihar
- Vikram Kapadia as Shashi Kapoor
- Anuradha Chandan as Anu Khanna
- Shanaya Kapoor as Alia
- Pradeep Pradhan as Kishore, Tia's cook
- Fahim Shaikh as Boobly
- Aalekh Kapoor as Sahil
- Sukant Goel as Wasim
- Aakriti Dobhal as Bunkoo
- Muskan Khanna Sharan as Manpreet
- Elena Fernandes as Rahul's manager
- Arbaaz Kadwani as Sharic
- Arya Sharma as Zoey
- Burjor Patel as Grandpa Chowksi
- Chandrajit Ranavde as Mr. Makhija, a broker
- Ram Singh as Muchchhad Paanwaala
- Rupa Kamath as Timmy Mausi
- Edward Sonnenblick as Dan
- Raju as Geishu
- Krish as a background dancer

== Production ==
In early 2015, Karan Johar announced his next film, titled Kapoor & Sons, which will feature Fawad Khan with Sidharth Malhotra and Alia Bhatt as the lead roles. Johar said in an interview "We have a very stylish star cast." The movie revolves around two brothers played by Fawad Khan and Sidharth Malhotra. Rishi Kapoor will be playing the grandfather of the male leads. Karan Johar said in an interview, "Kapoor & Sons (Since 1921) was a tough film to cast. There was a point when we almost didn't make it. We kept it on the backburner for over a year. No one was willing to do Fawad Khan's role. We went to six actors and after six rejections, I told Shakun Batra (director) that we should drop the idea and he started developing another screenplay."

== Soundtrack ==
The music for the film is composed by Amaal Mallik, Badshah, Arko, Tanishk Bagchi, Benny Dayal and Nucleya. The background score is given by Sameer Uddin. The lyrics are penned by Badshah, Kumaar, Manoj Muntashir, Dr. Devendra Kafir, and Abhiruchi Chand. Sony Music India have acquired the music rights of the film. Sameer Uddin won Best Background Score at the 62nd Filmfare Awards. The film's first song "Kar Gayi Chull", a party song, was released on 17 February 2016. The second song "Bolna" was released on 24 February 2016. The full music album was released on 4 March 2016 by Sony Music India which consisted of 5 songs.

== Critical response ==
The film upon its release received critical praise, particularly for its writing, direction, music and performances (particularly Khan, Rishi Kapoor, Shah and Rajat Kapoor).

=== India ===
Srijana Mitra Das from The Times of India gave it 4 stars & said, “Kapoor & Sons's star is its story. An entirely real family full of uncomfortable secrets, awkward jealousies, & sharp pain where brothers steal, parents cheat, siblings suspect, & 'perfect bachchas' don't have perfect love-lives.” Rohit Vats of Hindustan Times gave it 4/5 stars and called it a "fantastic family drama after a long time". Harshada Rege of DNA gave the film 4/5 stars and praised all characters in general and Fawad Khan in specific saying, "it's Fawad who shines bright. His performance as the "perfect" son with a secret, stands out. The actor shows versatility and vulnerability with equal ease. There's a lot more to this actor than good looks and charm". Anupama Chopra of Film Companion gave it 3.5/5 stars and commended the onscreen performances saying, "The actors breathe life in these movements." Saibal Chatterjee of NDTV gave the film 3.5/5 stars and said, "Kapoor & Sons is intense and incisive in its observation of human inadequacies but is always entertaining". Raja Sen of Rediff.com gave it 3/5 stars and said, "A likeable enough little film with fine characters, Kapoor & Sons tries too hard to turn on the water works at the end, going from a good, mellow drama to a full-blown melodrama by the end of it all". Ankush Bahuguna of MensXP.com gave the film 4/5 stars and called it "breath of fresh air" and "one of the best family films ever made in Bollywood". Subha Shetty-Saha gave it 4/5 stars and praised star cast saying, "it is the near perfect casting that works for the film too". Rachit Gupta of Filmfare praised the film saying, "it will be a tough order for any film this year to be as good as Kapoor & Sons". Dhriti Sharma of Zee News said, "The movie looks like a beautiful tiara, an amalgamation of fine comic punches that further grow with twists and curls into electrifying chemistry, ultimately rising to the reality block-- distorted yet perfect family".

Bollywood Hungama gave the film 4 stars and wrote that the film "makes for an excellent movie that you must watch with your entire family. This film is beautiful, kar gayi chull!". Stutee Gosh of The Quint gave the film 4.5/5 saying, "The first half is rib-tickling and super fun while the real action in the form of plot twists awaits us in the second half". She, although having praised Khan's performance, said his looks distracts viewers from parts of the film. Mehul S Thakkar of Deccan Chronicle gave it 4.5/5 and said, praising direction of the film, "all credit goes to director Shakun, who holds together the cast like a perfect photo in an album. His sensibilities in this family drama will certainly set a new benchmark". Shubhra Gupta of The Indian Express, gave 2 stars out of 5 stating, Sidharth brings to the table a loose-limbed pleasing vulnerability which he reveals slowly. Fawad plays his straight but awesome role. Namrata Joshi from The Hindu called it "the ultimate family film" and commented, "It is yet another film that has been brilliantly crafted and mapped out in terms of the writing, how the scenes slowly get built up towards a crescendo. It's an onion peel narrative in which the relationships, revelations, secrets and lies, unfinished confidences, unresolved issues, betrayals and conflicts are unspooled layer by layer." Talking about the characters, she described Khan's role "charming and delightful", Malhotra's as "solid and vulnerable", Bhatt as "hyper and ditzy" while calling Kapoor's role as "disappointing and out-of-sync".

Ananya Bhattacharya of India Today gave the film 3.5 stars and summarised the film as "madhouse-drama" while stating, "Shakun Batra's Kapoor And Sons wins in being able to portray the quick fixes that every family has to employ sometime or the other. This is what shines through. Batra crafts a refreshing tale of family problems and the art of sweeping them under the carpet. She also praised Khan's role, while praising Rajat Kapoor and Pathak's characters as "incomparable". She also applauded the film's cinematography and music. Anna M.M. Vetticad of Firstpost summed up the film as "the best film of 2016 so far". She stated, "Kapoor & Sons is hilarious, heartwarming and heartbreaking rolled in one. It does not wear its social conscience on its sleeve, but make no mistake about this: it has one. This is a disarmingly entertaining, thoughtful film that evokes a fuzzy feeling of warmth. It left me with wet cheeks, a smile on my face and a chuckle welling up in my throat at the memory of Daadu". Nirmalya Dutta of Daily News and Analysis described Khan's role as a gay male as "a big leap forward for India's LGBT movement, Khan had the guts and gumption to play this seminal role."

=== Overseas ===
Surabhi Redkar from Koimoi gave the film 3.5 stars and mentioned, "Kapoor And Sons is a modern-age family drama. It does not shy away from being emotionally soppy yet convincingly lovable. You could laugh, cry and smile through this one!". Redkar praised the characters' realistic nature. Manjusha Radhakrishanan of Gulf News gave it 3.5 stars and said, "Kapoor & Sons flourishes as a unit and is the sum total of mature performances by the entire Kapoor clan". Rachel Slatz of New York Times said, "Even though "Kapoor & Sons" goes from lightly comic to more darkly dramatic to pretty overtly melodramatic, it never loses its lived-in quality or plunges into the absurd". Deepa Gaurl of Khaleej Times gave it 2.5/5 and said, "Kapoor & Sons is heart-warming alright but fails short of building on the fantastically captured 'reality' it achieves early on, ending up 'neither here nor there." Although her review of the film was moderate, she praised Fawad Khan's performance saying, "The film, to a great extent, belongs to Fawad Khan – and he is terrific". Suprateek Chatterjee of HuffPost wrote, "Oddly enough, despite several chaotically edited sequences that have little breathing space and rely largely on exposition, the film feels bloated".

ARY News praised Shakun Batra's direction writing, "Batra creates a very watchable portrait of a house in crisis". It also commended Rajat Kapoor, Ratna Pathak Shah, and Fawad Khan for their performances. Zeshan Ahmad of The Express Tribune gave the film 4/5 stars and wrote, "Kapoor & Sons is a lesson in how a film can be entertaining, emotional and thought-provoking at the same time. A compelling script and brilliant performances in particular make it a must-watch!". Sana Fatima of The Nation gave it 8/10 stars and called it "one of the most methodically planned family drama". Daily Times wrote, "Nonetheless, the story manages to descend bare into the psyche of audiences with debonair imagery tied with picturesque beauty, keeping you mesmerized". Arva Aslam of Daily Pakistan said that all the credit for the film goes to its cast.

== Box office ==
=== Domestic ===
On opening day the film had its 900 prints released on 1500 screens and collected ₹6.85 crores in India to become fourth biggest opener of the year. On second day, the film collected ₹7.75 crores and took its two days collection to ₹14.60 crore. The film, on its first Sunday, collected ₹11.75 crores taking its domestic weekend's net collection to ₹26.35 crores. This was the second highest opening weekend collection of the year. Within its weekdays, the film became the 4th highest grossing Bollywood film of the year surpassing the lifetime collections of Mastizaade and Jai Gangaajal. In the first week, the film collected ₹47 crore which is the second highest opening week collection of the year following Airlift. The film continued running on more than 1000 screens in the following week. In the second week, the film collected ₹17.14 crore raising its domestic collection to ₹65.07 crore. After three weeks of theatrical run, the film collected ₹71.57 crore and grossed ₹102.24 crore. It became the third film of year to gross more than ₹100 crore.

=== International ===
The film collected ₹19.27 crore in its opening weekend overseas and became the highest first weekend opener of the year. In Pakistan, the film released on 67 screens and collected ₹1.3 crore on the first day. In the first weekend it collected ₹3.6 crore from Pakistan and became Fawad Khan's highest weekend opener in Pakistan, surpassing his debut Khoobsurat. Kapoor & Sons also had the biggest opening week of the year in the international market as it collected ₹0.42 crore.

By the end of its theatrical run, the film had collected ₹17.9 crore (US$1.9 million) from North America, ₹11.7 crore (US$1.2 million) from UAE, ₹6.39 crore (US$660,000) from Pakistan, ₹5.28 crore (US$550,000) from UK, ₹1.73 crore (US$180,000) from Australia, ₹0.63 crore (US$65,000) from New Zealand, ₹0.14 crore (US$15,000) from Malaysia, and ₹0.19 crore (US$20,000) from Germany. The lifetime overseas collection of the film was ₹47.8 crore (US$5.0 million) and it eventually became the fourth highest grossing Bollywood film overseas in 2016 following Sultan, Ae Dil Hai Mushkil, and Fan.

== Awards and nominations ==
Date of Ceremony	Award	Category	Recipient(s) and nominee(s)	Result	Ref.
11 August 2016	Indian Film Festival of Melbourne	Best Film	Kapoor & Sons (Since 1921)	Won	
11 August 2016	Indian Film Festival of Melbourne	Best Director	Shakun Batra	Nominated	
11 August 2016	Indian Film Festival of Melbourne	Diversity Award	Fawad Khan	Won	
4 December 2016	Star Screen Awards	Best Supporting Actor	Rishi Kapoor	Won	
19 December 2016	Stardust Awards	Best Supporting Role (Male)	Rishi Kapoor (also for Sanam Re)	Won	
19 December 2016	Stardust Awards	Best Supporting Role (Male)	Rajat Kapoor	Nominated	
19 December 2016	Stardust Awards	Best Supporting Role (Female)	Ratna Pathak Shah	Nominated	
19 December 2016	Stardust Awards	Best Director	Shakun Batra	Nominated	
19 December 2016	Stardust Awards	Best Film	Kapoor & Sons (Since 1921)	Nominated	
19 December 2016	Stardust Awards	Best Story	Ayesha Devitre, Shakun Batra	Won	
19 December 2016	Stardust Awards	Best Choreography	Adil Shaikh (for the song "Kar Gayi Chull")	Nominated	
19 December 2016	Stardust Awards	Best Costume Design	Archana Walavalkar, Nikita Raheja Mohanty, Natascha Charak	Nominated	
19 December 2016	Stardust Awards	Best Music Album	Sony Music India	Nominated	
14 January 2017	Filmfare Awards	Best Film	Hiroo Yash Johar, Karan Johar and Apoorva Mehta	Nominated	
14 January 2017	Filmfare Awards	Best Director	Shakun Batra	Nominated	
14 January 2017	Filmfare Awards	Best Supporting Actor	Fawad Khan	Nominated	
14 January 2017	Filmfare Awards	Best Supporting Actor	Rajat Kapoor	Nominated	
14 January 2017	Filmfare Awards	Best Supporting Actor	Rishi Kapoor	Won	
14 January 2017	Filmfare Awards	Best Supporting Actress	Ratna Pathak Shah	Nominated	
14 January 2017	Filmfare Awards	Best Story	Ayesha Devitre, Shakun Batra	Won	
14 January 2017	Filmfare Awards	Best Screenplay	Ayesha Devitre, Shakun Batra	Won	
14 January 2017	Filmfare Awards	Best Music Director	Amaal Mallik, Badshah, Arko Pravo Mukherjee, Tanishk Bagchi, Benny Dayal, Nucleya	Nominated	
14 January 2017	Filmfare Awards	Best Background Score	Sameer Uddin	Won	
14 January 2017	Filmfare Awards	Best Choreography	Adil Shaikh (for the song "Kar Gayi Chull")	Won	
18 February 2017	Mirchi Music Awards	Album of the Year	Amaal Mallik, Arko Pravo Mukherjee, Nucleya, Tanishk Bagchi	Nominated	
18 February 2017	Mirchi Music Awards	Male Vocalist of the Year	Arijit Singh – "Bolna"	Nominated	
18 February 2017	Mirchi Music Awards	Upcoming Female Vocalist of the Year	Asees Kaur – "Bolna"	Won	
18 February 2017	Mirchi Music Awards	Upcoming Music Composer of The Year	Tanishk Bagchi – "Bolna"	Won	
18 February 2017	Mirchi Music Awards	Upcoming Lyricist of The Year	Abhiruchi Chand – "Buddhu Sa Mann"	Won	
19 August 2017	Big Zee Entertainment Awards	Most Entertaining Romantic Film	Kapoor & Sons (Since 1921)	Nominated	
19 August 2017	Big Zee Entertainment Awards	Most Entertaining Actor in a Romantic Film – Male	Sidharth Malhotra	Nominated	
19 August 2017	Big Zee Entertainment Awards	Most Entertaining Actor in a Romantic Film – Female	Alia Bhatt	Nominated	
19 August 2017	Big Zee Entertainment Awards	Most Entertaining Singer (Male)	Arijit Singh (for the song "Bolna")	Nominated	
19 August 2017	Big Zee Entertainment Awards	Most Entertaining Singer (Female)	Asees Kaur (for the song "Bolna")	Nominated	
19 August 2017	Big Zee Entertainment Awards	Most Entertaining Song	"Kar Gayi Chull"	Nominated	
19 August 2017	Big Zee Entertainment Awards	Most Entertaining Music	Amaal Mallik, Badshah, Arko, Tanishk Bagchi, Benny Dayal, Nucleya	Nominated	
11 March 2017	Zee Cine Awards	Best Supporting Actor	Rajat Kapoor	Nominated	
11 March 2017	Zee Cine Awards	Best Supporting Actor	Rishi Kapoor	Won	
11 March 2017	Zee Cine Awards	Best Actor in a Comic Role	Rishi Kapoor	Won	
11 March 2017	Zee Cine Awards	Best Film	Kapoor & Sons (Since 1921)	Nominated	
11 March 2017	Zee Cine Awards	Best Director	Shakun Batra	Nominated	
11 March 2017	Zee Cine Awards	Best Supporting Actress	Ratna Pathak Shah	Nominated	
11 March 2017	Zee Cine Awards	Song of the Year	"Kar Gayi Chull"	Nominated	
11 March 2017	Zee Cine Awards	Best Story	Ayesha Devitre, Shakun Batra	Won	
14 July 2017	International Indian Film Academy Awards	Best Story	Ayesha Devitre, Shakun Batra	Won	
14 July 2017	International Indian Film Academy Awards	Best Supporting Actress	Ratna Pathak Shah	Nominated	
14 July 2017	International Indian Film Academy Awards	Best Supporting Actor	Rajat Kapoor	Nominated	
14 July 2017	International Indian Film Academy Awards	Best Supporting Actor	Rishi Kapoor	Nominated	
14 July 2017	International Indian Film Academy Awards	Best Actor in a Comic Role	Rishi Kapoor	Nominated	
14 July 2017	International Indian Film Academy Awards	Best Choreography	Adil Shaikh	Won	
