= 62nd Filmfare Awards =

2017 awards for Hindi cinema

- 62nd Filmfare Awards
- Date: 14 January 2017
- Site: NSCI Dome, Mumbai
- Hosted by: Shah Rukh Khan; Karan Johar; Kapil Sharma
- Official website: Filmfare Awards 2017

Highlights
- Best Film: Dangal
- Critics Award for Best Film: Neerja
- Most awards: Neerja (6)
- Most nominations: Ae Dil Hai Mushkil & Udta Punjab (9)

Television coverage
- Network: Sony Entertainment Television (India)

The 62nd Filmfare Awards ceremony, presented by the Filmfare magazine, honoured the best Hindi language Indian films of 2016. The ceremony was held in Mumbai on 14 January 2017 and was co-hosted by Shah Rukh Khan, Karan Johar and Kapil Sharma.

Ae Dil Hai Mushkil and Udta Punjab led the ceremony with 9 nominations each, followed by Kapoor & Sons and Neerja with 8 nominations each.

Neerja was the most-awarded film at the ceremony with 6 wins, including Best Film (Critics) (for Ram Madhvani), Best Actress (Critics) (for Sonam Kapoor) and Best Supporting Actress (for Shabana Azmi).

Alia Bhatt was nominated twice for Best Actress for her performances in Dear Zindagi and Udta Punjab, winning for the latter.

== Winners and nominees ==
=== Main awards ===
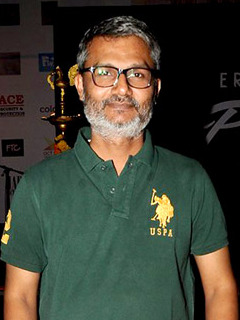
Nitesh Tiwari, Best Director

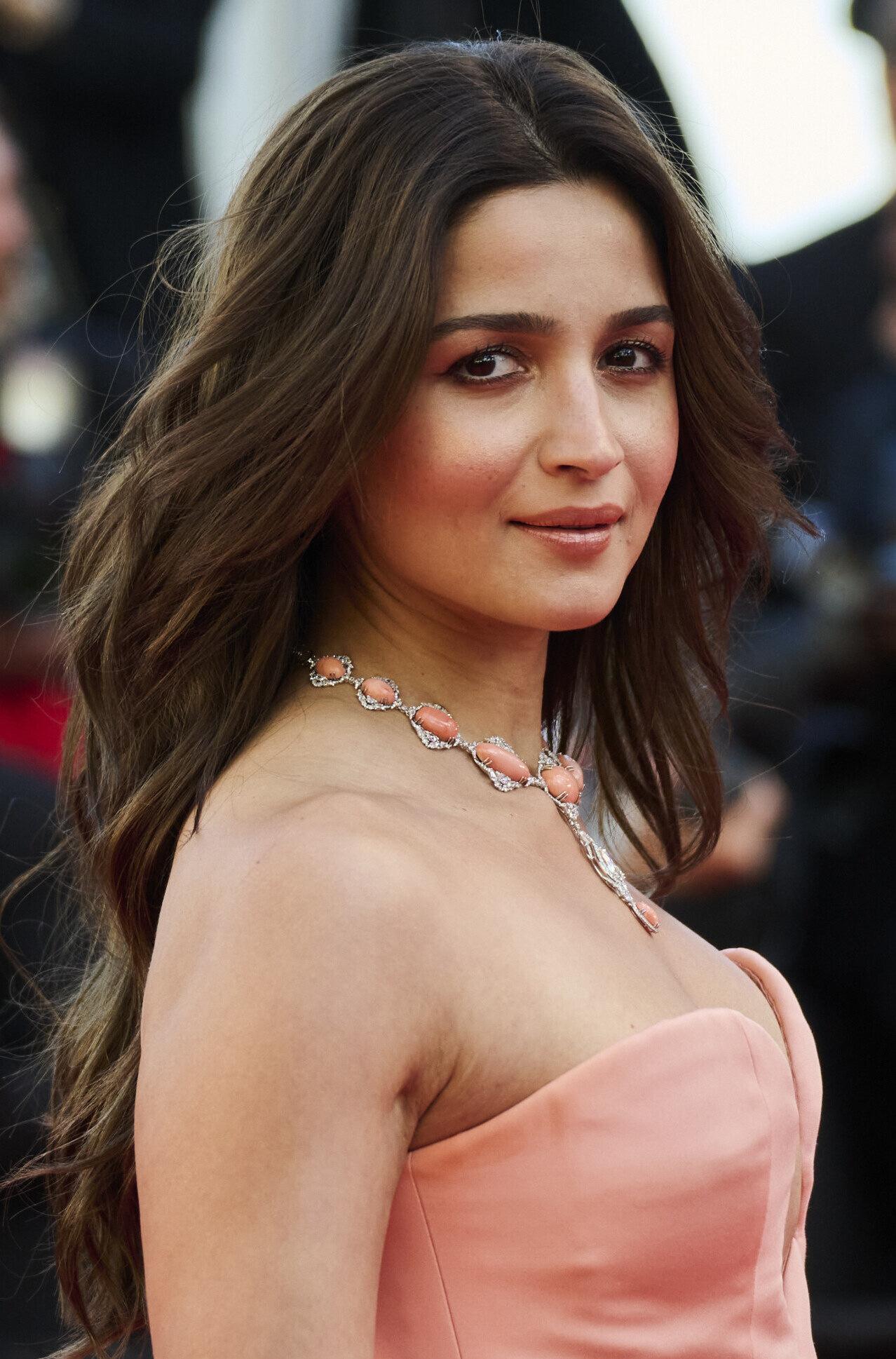
Alia Bhatt, Best Actress

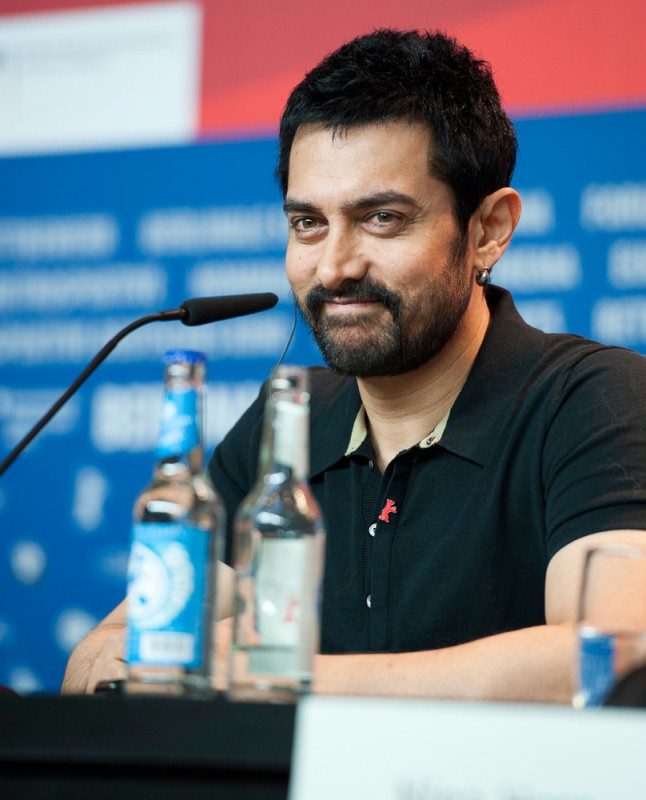
Aamir Khan, Best Actor

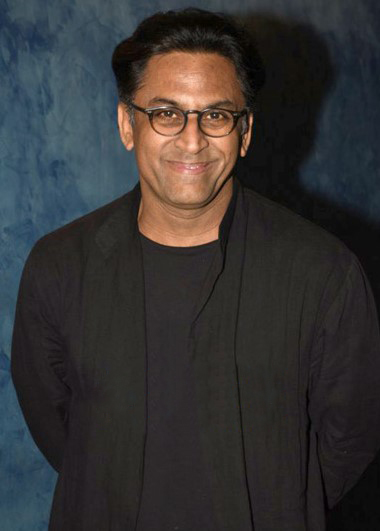
Ram Madhvani, Best Director Critics

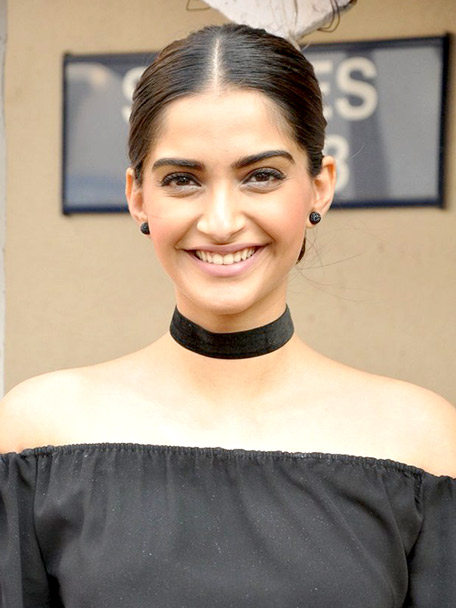
Sonam Kapoor, Best Actress Critics

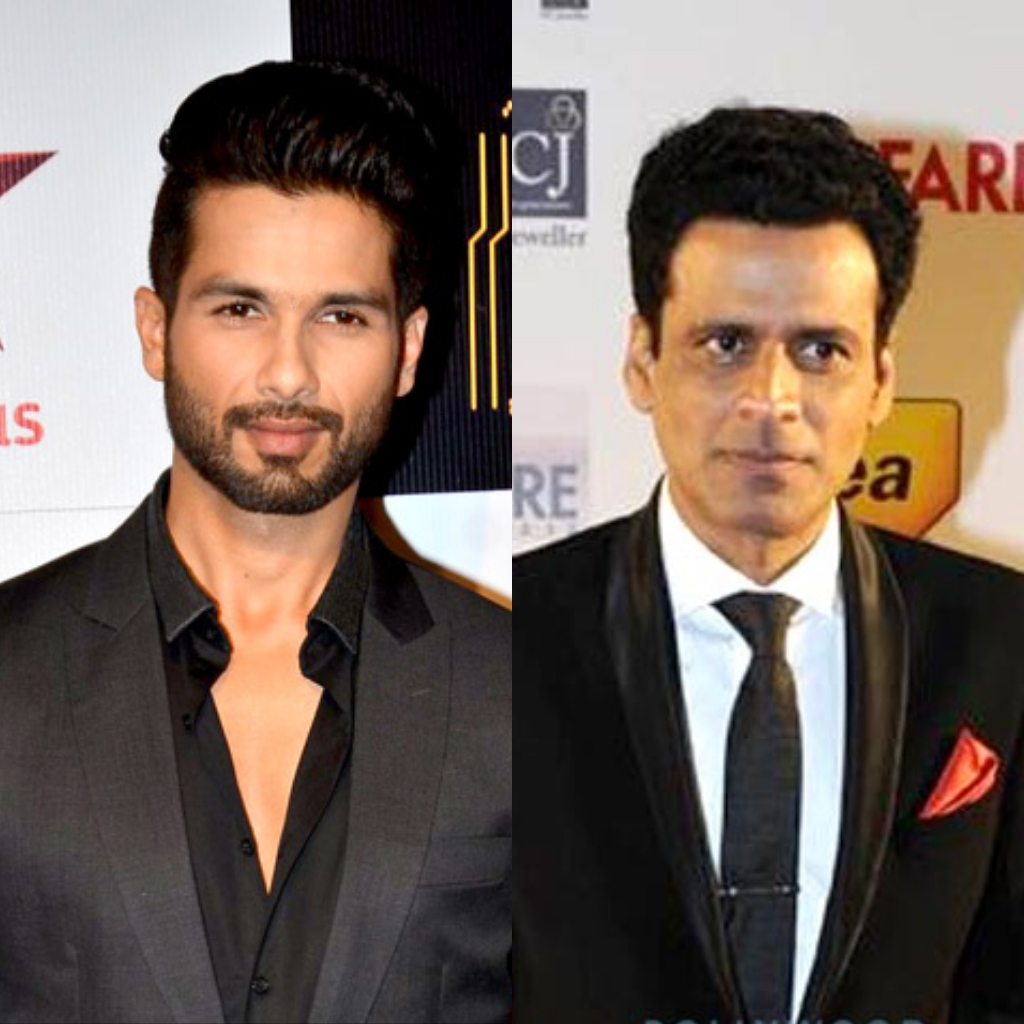
Shahid Kapoor & Manoj Bajpayee, Best Actor Critics

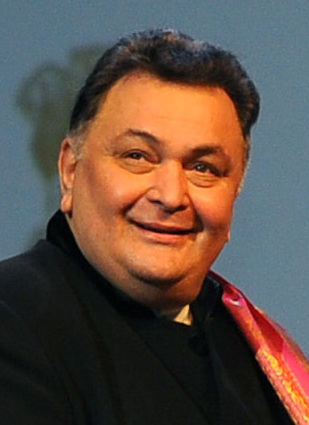
Rishi Kapoor, Best Supporting Actor

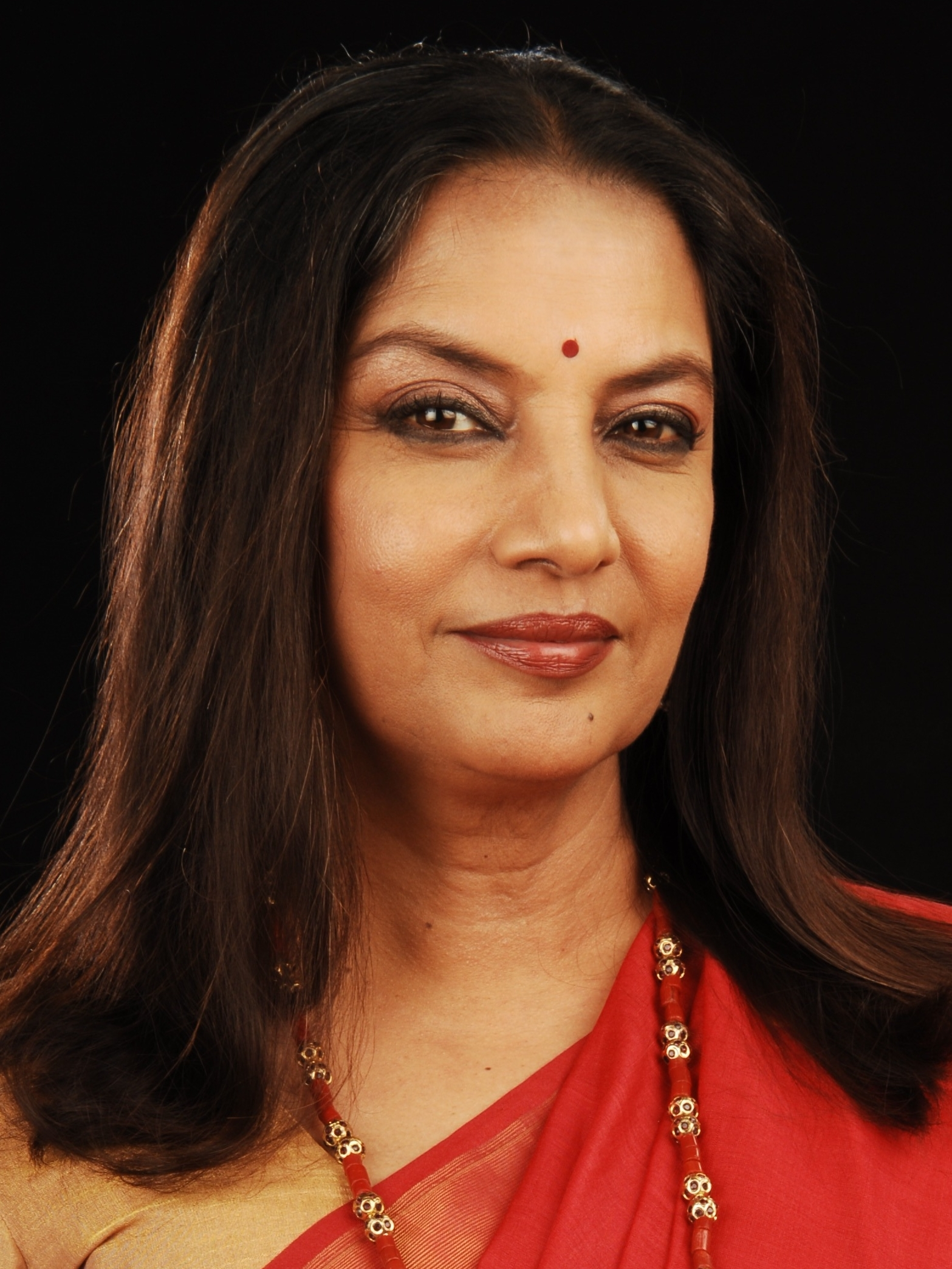
Shabana Azmi, Best Supporting Actress

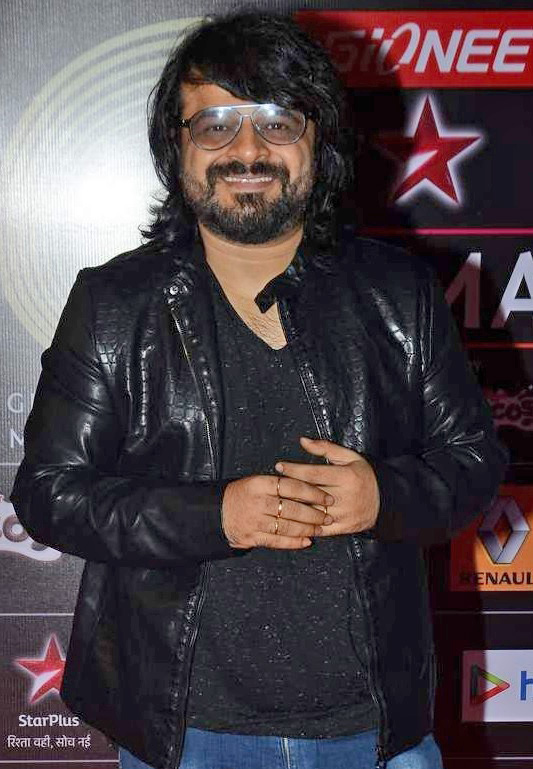
Pritam, Best Music Director

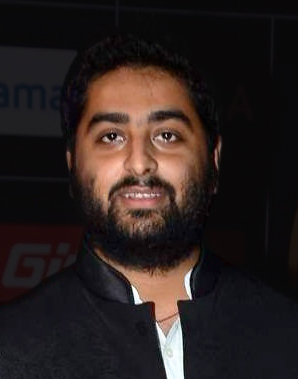
Arijit Singh, Best Male Playback Singer

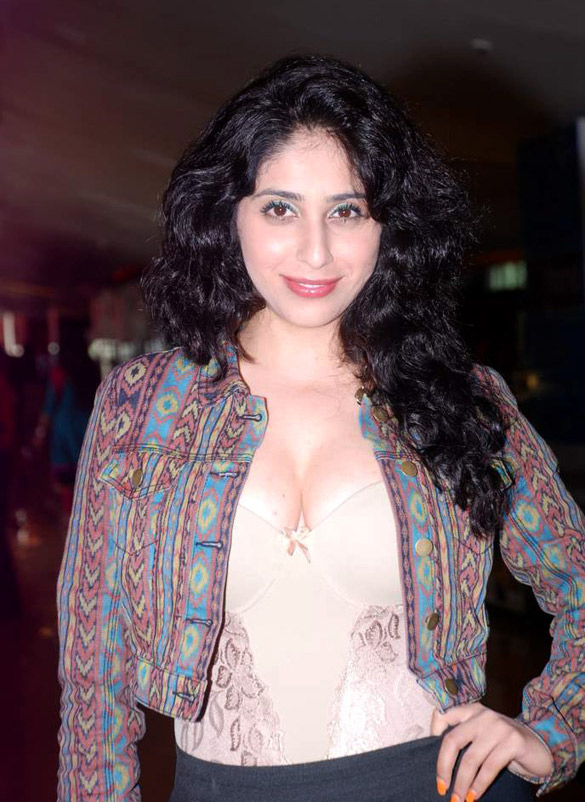
Neha Bhasin, Best Female Playback Singer

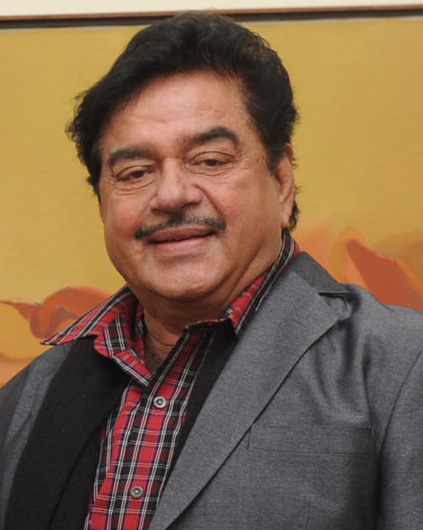
Shatrughan Sinha, Lifetime Achievement Awardee

Nominees were announced on 9 January 2017.

Best Film	Best Director
Dangal; Kapoor & Sons; Neerja; Pink; Sultan; Udta Punjab	Nitesh Tiwari – Dangal; Abhishek Chaubey – Udta Punjab; Ali Abbas Zafar – Sultan; Karan Johar – Ae Dil Hai Mushkil; Ram Madhvani – Neerja; Shakun Batra – Kapoor & Sons
Best Actor	Best Actress
Aamir Khan – Dangal as Mahavir Singh Phogat; Amitabh Bachchan – Pink as Deepak Sehgal; Ranbir Kapoor – Ae Dil Hai Mushkil as Ayan Sanger; Salman Khan – Sultan as Sultan Ali Khan; Shah Rukh Khan – Fan as Gaurav Chandna / Aryan Khanna; Shahid Kapoor – Udta Punjab as Tejinder "Tommy" Singh; Sushant Singh Rajput – M.S. Dhoni: The Untold Story as MS Dhoni	Alia Bhatt – Udta Punjab as Bauria / Mary Jane; Aishwarya Rai Bachchan – Sarbjit as Dalbir Kaur; Alia Bhatt – Dear Zindagi as Kaira; Anushka Sharma – Ae Dil Hai Mushkil as Alizeh Khan; Sonam Kapoor – Neerja as Neerja Bhanot; Vidya Balan – Kahaani 2 as Vidya Sinha / Durga Rani Singh
Best Supporting Actor	Best Supporting Actress
Rishi Kapoor – Kapoor & Sons as Amarjeet "Dadu" Kapoor; Diljit Dosanjh – Udta Punjab as ASI Sartaj Singh; Fawad Khan – Kapoor & Sons as Rahul Kapoor; Jim Sarbh – Neerja as Khalil; Rajat Kapoor – Kapoor & Sons as Harsh Kapoor; Rajkummar Rao – Aligarh as Deepu Sebastian	Shabana Azmi – Neerja as Rama Bhanot; Kareena Kapoor – Udta Punjab as Dr. Preet Sahni; Kirti Kulhari – Pink as Falak Ali; Ratna Pathak Shah – Kapoor & Sons as Sunita Kapoor; Richa Chadda – Sarbjit as Sukhpreet Kaur
Best Male Debut	Best Female Debut
Diljit Dosanjh – Udta Punjab as ASI Sartaj Singh	Ritika Singh – Saala Khadoos as Madhi
Best Music Director	Best Lyricist
Pritam – Ae Dil Hai Mushkil; Amaal Mallik, Badshah, Arko Pravo Mukherjee, Tanishk Bagchi, Benny Dayal, Nucleya – Kapoor & Sons; Amit Trivedi – Udta Punjab; Meet Bros, Amaal Mallik, Manj Musik, Ankit Tiwari – Baaghi; Shankar–Ehsaan–Loy – Mirzya; Vishal–Shekhar – Sultan	Amitabh Bhattacharya – "Channa Mereya" – Ae Dil Hai Mushkil; Gulzar – "Aave Re Hitchki" – Mirzya; Gulzar – "Mirzya" – Mirzya; Irshad Kamil – "Jag Ghoomeya" – Sultan; Kausar Munir – "Love You Zindagi" – Dear Zindagi; Late Shiv Kumar Batalvi – "Ikk Kudi" – Udta Punjab
Best Playback Singer – Male	Best Playback Singer – Female
Arijit Singh – "Ae Dil Hai Mushkil" – Ae Dil Hai Mushkil; Amit Mishra – "Bulleya" – Ae Dil Hai Mushkil; Arijit Singh – "Channa Mereya" – Ae Dil Hai Mushkil; Atif Aslam – "Tere Sang Yaara" – Rustom; Rahat Fateh Ali Khan – "Jag Ghoomeya" – Sultan	Neha Bhasin – "Jag Ghoomeya" – Sultan; Kanika Kapoor – "Da Da Dasse" – Udta Punjab; Jonita Gandhi – "The Breakup Song" – Ae Dil Hai Mushkil; Neeti Mohan – "Sau Aasmaan" – Baar Baar Dekho; Palak Muchhal – "Kaun Tujhe" – M.S. Dhoni: The Untold Story; Qurat-ul-Ain Balouch – "Kaari Kaari" – Pink

=== Critics' awards ===
Best Movie (Best Director)
Neerja – Ram Madhvani
Best Actor	Best Actress
Manoj Bajpayee – Aligarh; Shahid Kapoor – Udta Punjab	Sonam Kapoor – Neerja

=== Best Story ===
- Shakun Batra & Ayesha Devitre Dhillon – Kapoor & Sons

=== Best Screenplay ===
- Shakun Batra & Ayesha Devitre Dhillon – Kapoor & Sons

=== Best Dialogue ===
- Ritesh Shah – Pink

=== Best Cinematography ===
- Mitesh Mirchandani – Neerja

=== Best Editing ===
- Monisha R. Baldawa – Neerja

=== Best Costume ===
- Payal Saluja – Udta Punjab

=== Best Action ===
- Sham Kaushal – Dangal

=== Best Background Score ===
- Sameer Uddin – Kapoor & Sons

=== Best Choreography ===
- Adil Shaikh – ''Kar Gayi Chull'' from Kapoor & Sons

=== Best Visual Effects ===
- Red Chillies Entertainment – Fan

=== Best Production Design ===
- Aparna Sud – Neerja

=== Best Sound Design ===
- Vivek Sachidanand – Phobia

=== Best Debut Director ===
- Ashwiny Iyer Tiwari – Nil Battey Sannata

=== Best Short Film (People's Choice) ===
- Khamakha

=== Best Short Film (Fiction) ===
- Chutney

=== Best Short Film (Non-fiction) ===
- Matitali Kusti

=== Best Actor (Male) in a Short Film ===
- Manoj Bajpayee – Taandav

=== Best Actor (Female) in a Short Film ===
- Tisca Chopra – Chutney

=== Filmfare Lifetime Achievement Award ===
- Shatrughan Sinha

=== Filmfare R.D. Burman Award – New Music Talent ===
- Amit Mishra – "Bulleya" from Ae Dil Hai Mushkil

== Most wins ==
- Neerja – 6
- Kapoor & Sons (Since 1921) – 5
- Ae Dil Hai Mushkil, Dangal & Udta Punjab – 4

== See also ==
- Filmfare Awards
