= Amaal Mallik =

Indian music director, composer, background scorer, producer, lyricist, singer

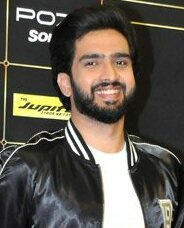
- Mallik in 2023
- Born: 16 June 1990 (age 36); Mumbai, Maharashtra, India
- Education: Narsee Monjee College, Jamnabai Narsee School; Trinity Laban Conservatoire of Music and Dance
- Occupations: Playback singer; music composer; music producer; lyricist
- Years active: 2014–present
- Notable work: M.S. Dhoni: The Untold Story; Noor; Saina
- Parent(s): Daboo Malik, Jyoti Malik
- Relatives: Sardar Malik (grandfather); Armaan Malik (brother); Anu Malik (uncle); Abu Malik (uncle)
- Honours: Filmfare Award for Best Music Director, 2020; Filmfare Award for Best Music Director, 2016
- Musical career
- Genres: Filmi; Soundtrack; Jazz; Film score; EDM • R&B • Classical Music • Pop music • Indian pop • Ballad
- Labels: Zee Music Company; T-Series; Sony Music India; MWM Entertainment

Amaal Mallik (born 16 June 1990) is an Indian music director, composer, and singer who works primarily in the Hindi cinema. He made his debut as a film composer with Jai Ho (2014) and gained wider recognition with the 2015 song "Sooraj Dooba Hain", which achieved commercial success and contributed to his emergence as a notable composer in the Hindi cinema. In 2025, he participated in Bigg Boss 19, emerging as the fourth runner-up.

Parallel to his film soundtrack career, Mallik has expanded his musical presence through independent releases. His early singles, including "Chal Waha Jaate Hain", "Zindagi Aa Raha Hoon Main" and "Main Rahoon Ya Na Rahoon", all released in 2015, achieved widespread popularity and contributed to the growing trend of non-film Hindi singles in the mid-2010s.

Mallik received further critical and commercial recognition for his work on the soundtrack of M.S. Dhoni: The Untold Story (2016). This was followed by a series of commercially successful films, Airlift (2016), Kapoor & Sons (2016), Badrinath Ki Dulhania (2017), Baaghi (2016), Golmaal Again (2017) and Kabir Singh (2019). Over a career spanning more than a decade, he has composed music for numerous Hindi films and has received several accolades, including six Mirchi Music awards, four International Indian Film Academy awards and two Filmfare awards.

== Early life ==
Amaal Mallik is the elder of two children born to music director Daboo Malik and Jyothi Malik. He studied in Jamnabai Narsee School and completed his under-graduation in Bachelor of Commerce from Narsee Monjee College of Commerce and Economics in Mumbai. His younger brother Armaan Malik is also a well-known musician.

He started learning music at the age of 8 and took a liking towards the piano. He studied piano and completed his course at Trinity College of Music (Western Classical, Jazz & Rock) under the guidance and training he received from teachers including Benny, Xavier Fernandes, Tony Pinto and Joy Bose. He also trained in Indian classical music informally under the tutelage of his grandfather Sardar Malik.

== Career ==
Mallik began his career journey at a young age. After completing his 10th grade, he immediately went on to assist music composer and background scorer Amar Mohile for the soundtrack of Sarkar (2005) and Shootout at Lokhandwala (2007) at the age of 15, later moving on to producing and arranging music for his father in films like Sohail Khan's Kisaan (2009), for which he collaborated on a remix track of the 1967 song, "Mere Desh Ki Dharti" with pop singer, Daler Mehndi.

Malik produced background scores for Sandeep Chowta and Salim–Sulaiman for films like Rowdy Rathore (2012), R... Rajkumar (2013), Saheb, Biwi Aur Gangster Returns (2013), Heroine (2012), Youngistaan (2014), Ab Tak Chhappan 2 (2015), and Phata Poster Nikla Hero (2013).

His first outing as a solo background scorer was for Saina (2021), a biopic on the life of ace badminton player Saina Nehwal.

In 2014, he debuted as a music composer. He composed three songs for Salman Khan's film Jai Ho and a song for Khoobsurat.

In 2017, he composed two songs for Badrinath Ki Dulhania, of which he sang "Aashiq Surrender Hua" with Shreya Ghoshal; another, "Roke Na Ruke Naina" was sung by Arijit Singh. Singh won Filmfare Award for Best Male Playback Singer and Mallik earned a nomination of Filmfare Award for Best Music Director along with Tanishk Bagchi an Akhil Sachdeva. Mallik composed all the songs for Noor, and sang a song with Tulsi Kumar. He composed two songs for Chef, two songs for Golmaal Again, and two songs for Mubarakan; he also sang in the latter. He composed two singles in the same, both sung by his younger brother Armaan Malik.

In 2018, Mallik composed two singles, "Ghar Se Nikalte Hi" and "Ready to Move". Armaan sang in both songs. Mallik also composed a song for Sonu Ke Titu Ki Sweety which earned him IIFA best music director of 2019.

In 2019, Mallik composed two songs, "Kyun Rabba" (sung by Armaan Malik) and "Tum Na Aaye" (sung by K.K.) for the Sujoy Ghosh thriller Badla, which marked him as the youngest composer to compose for Amitabh Bachchan. Mallik was featured as judge in the Indian reality singing show, Sa Re Ga Ma Pa L'il Champs. He next composed "Chale Aana", sung by Armaan, for the Luv Ranjan backed De De Pyaar De. He also composed a song for the second highest-grossing film that year, Kabir Singh, which was titled "Yeh Aaina" and sung by Shreya Ghoshal. On 8 July 2020 another single was released under the name of "Zara Thehro", sung by his brother Armaan Malik and Tulsi Kumar under the label T-Series.

In 2020, Eastern Eye also listed him in "Dynamic dozen for the decade" in its 11th edition.

In August 2020 he come back with new song 'Dil Ko Maine Di Kasam" music is composed by himself, sung by Arijit Singh, lyrics are penned by Kumaar.

Amaal Mallik announced his debut single titled "Tu Mera Nahi", sung and performed by him in collaboration with Sony Music India.

He announced his upcoming song from Saina. In this film Mallik composed 3 songs titled, "Chal Wahin Chale" sung by Shreya Ghoshal, "Main Hoon Na Tere Saath" sung by Armaan Malik and "Parinda" sung by himself.

In September 2021, Mallik, along with Sukriti Kakar and Prakriti Kakar, collaborated with Dua Lipa for Indian remix version of "Levitating" .

== Discography ==
=== As a composer ===
Key
| † | Denotes films that have not yet been released |

| Year | Film | Song | Singer(s) | Lyrics | Notes |
|---|---|---|---|---|---|
| 2014 | Jai Ho | "Tumko To Aana Hi Tha" | Armaan Malik, Marianne D'Cruz, Altamash Faridi | Shabbir Ahmed | Debut film as a film composer |
| 2014 | Jai Ho | "Jai Ho (Title Track)" | Wajid Khan, Armaan Malik | Shabbir Ahmed | Debut film as a film composer |
| 2014 | Jai Ho | "Love You Till The End (House Mix)" | Armaan Malik | | Debut film as a film composer |
| 2014 | Khoobsurat | "Naina" | Sona Mohapatra, Armaan Malik | Kumaar | |
| 2014 | Khoobsurat | "Naina (Female)" | Sona Mohapatra | Kumaar | |
| 2015 | Roy | "Sooraj Dooba Hain" | Arijit Singh, Aditi Singh Sharma | Kumaar | Won — Filmfare Award for Best Music Director; Won — Producers Guild Film Awards |
| 2015 | Roy | "Sooraj Dooba Hain (version 2)" | Arijit Singh, Aditi Singh Sharma | Kumaar | Won — Filmfare Award for Best Music Director; Won — Producers Guild Film Awards |
| 2015 | Ek Paheli Leela | "Tere Bin Nahi Laage" | Uzair Jaswal | Kumaar | Recreated song; original music and co-composed by Uzair Jaswal |
| 2015 | Ek Paheli Leela | "Tere Bin Nahi Laage (Female Version)" | Tulsi Kumar, Aishwarya Majmudar, Alamgir Khan | Kumaar | Recreated song; original music and co-composed by Uzair Jaswal |
| 2015 | Ek Paheli Leela | "Saiyaan Superstar" | Tulsi Kumar | Kumaar | |
| 2015 | All Is Well | "Chaar Shanivaar" | Vishal Dadlani, Badshah | Shabbir Ahmed | |
| 2015 | Hero | "Main Hoon Hero Tera (Salman Khan Version)" | Salman Khan | Kumaar | |
| 2015 | Hero | "Main Hoon Hero Tera (Armaan Malik Version)" | Armaan Malik | Kumaar | |
| 2015 | Hero | "Main Hoon Hero Tera (Armaan Malik Sad Version)" | Armaan Malik | Kumaar | |
| 2015 | Hero | "O Khuda" | Amaal Mallik, Palak Muchhal | Kumaar | Debut as a singer |
| 2015 | Calendar Girls | "Khwaishein (Rock Version)" | Arijit Singh | Kumaar | |
| 2015 | Calendar Girls | "Khwaishein (Film version)" | Armaan Malik | Kumaar | |
| 2015 | Calendar Girls | "Shaadi Wali Night" | Aditi Singh Sharma | Kumaar | |
| 2015 | Hate Story 3 | "Tumhe Apna Banane Ka Junoon" | Armaan Malik, Neeti Mohan | Rashmi Virag | Hook line was taken from the song "Tumhe Apna Banane Ki Kasam" of Sadak (1991) |
| 2016 | Airlift | "Soch Na Sake" | Arijit Singh, Tulsi Kumar, Amaal Mallik | Kumaar | Inspired from a single titled "Soch" of Hardy Sandhu |
| 2016 | Airlift | "Soch Na Sake (Solo Version)" | Arijit Singh | Kumaar | Inspired from a single titled "Soch" of Hardy Sandhu |
| 2016 | Airlift | "Tu Bhoola Jise" | KK | Kumaar | |
| 2016 | Airlift | "Mera Nachan Nu" | Brijesh Shandilya, Divya Kumar, Amaal Mallik | Kumaar | |
| 2016 | Mastizaade | "Rom Rom Romantic" | Mika Singh, Armaan Malik | Manoj Muntashir | |
| 2016 | Sanam Re | "Gazab Ka Hai Yeh Din" | Arijit Singh | Manoj Muntashir | Hook line was taken from the song "Gazab Ka Hai Din" of Qayamat Se Qayamat Tak (1988) |
| 2016 | Sanam Re | "Kya Tujhe Ab Ye Dil Bataye" | Falak Shabir | Manoj Muntashir | |
| 2016 | Sanam Re | "Hua Hain Aaj Pehli Baar" | Armaan Malik, Palak Muchhal | Manoj Yadav | |
| 2016 | Kapoor & Sons | "Kar Gayi Chull (Original music and co-composed by Badshah)" | Badshah, Fazilpuria, Sukriti Kakar, Neha Kakkar | Badshah, Kumaar | Nominated — Filmfare Award for Best Music Director |
| 2016 | Kapoor & Sons | "Buddhu Sa Mann" | Armaan Malik | Abhiruchi Chand | Nominated — Filmfare Award for Best Music Director |
| 2016 | Baaghi | "Sab Tera" | Armaan Malik, Shraddha Kapoor | Sanjeev Chaturvedi | Nominated — Filmfare Award for Best Music Director |
| 2016 | Azhar | "Bol Do Na Zara" | Armaan Malik | Rashmi Virag | |
| 2016 | Azhar | "Tu Hi Na Jaane" | Sonu Nigam, Prakriti Kakar | Kumaar | |
| 2016 | Azhar | "Jeet Ne Ke Liye" | KK | Kumaar | |
| 2016 | Sarbjit | "Salamat" | Arjit Singh, Tulsi Kumar | Rashmi Virag | |
| 2016 | Do Lafzon Ki Kahani | "Kuch To Hai" | Armaan Malik | Manoj Muntashir | |
| 2016 | M.S. Dhoni : The Untold Story | "Besabriyaan" | Armaan Malik | Manoj Muntashir | All songs were released in four languages: Hindi, Tamil, Telugu and Marathi |
| 2016 | M.S. Dhoni : The Untold Story | "Kaun Tujhe (Armaan Malik Version)" | Armaan Malik | Manoj Muntashir | All songs were released in four languages: Hindi, Tamil, Telugu and Marathi |
| 2016 | M.S. Dhoni : The Untold Story | "Jab Tak" | Armaan Malik | Manoj Muntashir | All songs were released in four languages: Hindi, Tamil, Telugu and Marathi |
| 2016 | M.S. Dhoni : The Untold Story | "Jab Tak (Redux)" | Armaan Malik | Manoj Muntashir | All songs were released in four languages: Hindi, Tamil, Telugu and Marathi |
| 2016 | M.S. Dhoni : The Untold Story | "Phir Kabhi" | Arijit Singh | Manoj Muntashir | All songs were released in four languages: Hindi, Tamil, Telugu and Marathi |
| 2016 | M.S. Dhoni : The Untold Story | "Phir Kabhi (Reprise)" | Arijit Singh | Manoj Muntashir | All songs were released in four languages: Hindi, Tamil, Telugu and Marathi |
| 2016 | M.S. Dhoni : The Untold Story | "Kaun Tujhe" | Palak Muchhal | Manoj Muntashir | All songs were released in four languages: Hindi, Tamil, Telugu and Marathi |
| 2016 | M.S. Dhoni : The Untold Story | "Parwah Nahin" | Siddharth Basrur | Manoj Muntashir | All songs were released in four languages: Hindi, Tamil, Telugu and Marathi |
| 2016 | M.S. Dhoni : The Untold Story | "Padhoge Likhoge" | Ananya Nanda, Adithyan, A. Prithviraj | Manoj Muntashir | All songs were released in four languages: Hindi, Tamil, Telugu and Marathi |
| 2016 | Baar Baar Dekho | "Sau Aasmaan" | Neeti Mohan, Armaan Malik | Kumaar | |
| 2016 | Force 2 | "Catch Me If You Can" | Amaal Mallik | Kumaar | |
| 2016 | Force 2 | "Ishaara" | Armaan Malik | Rashmi Virag | |
| 2017 | Badrinath Ki Dulhania | "Aashiq Surrender Hua" | Amaal Mallik, Shreya Ghoshal | Shabbir Ahmed | Won — IIFA Award for Best Music Director; Nominated — Filmfare Award for Best Music Director |
| 2017 | Badrinath Ki Dulhania | "Roke Na Ruke Naina" | Arijit Singh | Kumaar | Won — IIFA Award for Best Music Director; Nominated — Filmfare Award for Best Music Director |
| 2017 | Noor | "Uff Yeh Noor" | Armaan Malik | Manoj Muntashir | |
| 2017 | Noor | "Hai Zaroori" | Prakriti Kakkar | Manoj Muntashir | |
| 2017 | Noor | "Gulabi 2.0" | Amaal Mallik, Tulsi Kumar, Yash Narvekar | Kumaar | Original song, "Gulaabi Aankhen Jo Teri Dekhi" was composed by R. D. Burman and written by Anand Bakshi for The Train (1970) |
| 2017 | Noor | "Gulabi (Redux)" | Tulsi Kumar, Yash Narvekar | Kumaar | Original song, "Gulaabi Aankhen Jo Teri Dekhi" was composed by R. D. Burman and written by Anand Bakshi for The Train (1970) |
| 2017 | Noor | "Jise Kehte Pyaar Hai" | Sukriti Kakkar | Kumaar | |
| 2017 | Mubarakan | "The Goggle Song" | Sonu Nigam, Armaan Malik, Amaal Mallik, Tulsi Kumar, Neeti Mohan | Kumaar | |
| 2017 | Mubarakan | "Jatt Jaguar" | Vishal Dadlani, Navraj Hans, Apeksha Dandekar | Kumaar | |
| 2017 | Chef | "Tere Mere" | Armaan Malik | Rashmi Virag | |
| 2017 | Chef | "Tere Mere (Reprise)" | Armaan Malik | Rashmi Virag | |
| 2017 | Golmaal Again | "Hum Nahi Sudrenge" | Armaan Malik | Kumaar | |
| 2017 | Golmaal Again | "Neend Churai" | Neeraj Shridhar, Sukriti Kakkar | Kumaar | Hook line taken from the song "Neend Churayee Meri" of Ishq (1997), credited to the American freestyle band, Linear |
| 2018 | Sonu Ke Titu Ki Sweety | "Subah Subah" | Arijit Singh, Prakriti Kakkar, Amaal Mallik | Kumaar | Won — IIFA Award for Best Music Director; Nominated — Filmfare Award for Best Music Director |
| 2019 | Badla | "Kyun Rabba" | Armaan Malik | Kumaar | Youngest music composer to compose songs for Amitabh Bachchan |
| 2019 | Badla | "Kyun Rabba (Reprise)" | Armaan Malik | Kumaar | Youngest music composer to compose songs for Amitabh Bachchan |
| 2019 | Badla | "Tum Na Aaye" | KK | A. M. Turaz | Youngest music composer to compose songs for Amitabh Bachchan |
| 2019 | De De Pyaar De | "Tu Mila Toh Hai Na" | Arijit Singh | Kunaal Vermaa | |
| 2019 | De De Pyaar De | "Tu Mila Toh Hai Na (Atif Aslam Version)" | Atif Aslam | Kunaal Vermaa | Released later unofficially |
| 2019 | De De Pyaar De | "Chale Aana" | Armaan Malik | Kunaal Vermaa | |
| 2019 | Kabir Singh | "Ye Aaina" | Shreya Ghoshal | Irshad Kamil | Won — Filmfare Award for Best Music Director; Won — International Indian Film Academy Awards for Best Music Director |
| 2021 | Saina | "Main Hoon Na Tere Saath" | Armaan Malik | Kunaal Vermaa | Nominated — Filmfare Award for Best Music Director |
| 2021 | Saina | "Parinda" | Amaal Mallik | Manoj Muntashir | Nominated — Filmfare Award for Best Music Director |
| 2021 | Saina | "A Mother's Love" | Suvarna Tiwari | Manoj Muntashir | Nominated — Filmfare Award for Best Music Director |
| 2021 | Saina | "Chal Wahan Chalein" | Shreya Ghoshal | Manoj Muntashir | Nominated — Filmfare Award for Best Music Director |
| 2021 | Saina | "The Staircase of Life" | Shreya Ghoshal | Instrumental | Nominated — Filmfare Award for Best Music Director |
| 2021 | Saina | "Embrace Yourself" | Shreya Ghoshal | Instrumental | Nominated — Filmfare Award for Best Music Director |
| 2021 | Saina | "Hall of Mirrors" | Shreya Ghoshal | Instrumental | Nominated — Filmfare Award for Best Music Director |
| 2021 | Saina | "The Curse of a Champion" | Snigdha Pious | Instrumental | Nominated — Filmfare Award for Best Music Director |
| 2021 | Saina | "The Sword of Saina" | Suzanne D'Mello | Instrumental | Nominated — Filmfare Award for Best Music Director |
| 2021 | Koi Jaane Na | "Koi Jaane Na (Title Track)" | Armaan Malik, Tulsi Kumar, Amaal Mallik | Kumaar | |
| 2021 | Koi Jaane Na | "Koi Jaane Na (Title Track Version 2)" | Atif Aslam, Tulsi Kumar | Kumaar | Not released |
| 2021 | Koi Jaane Na | "Ishq Karo Dil Se" | Jubin Nautiyal | Kumaar | |
| 2021 | Bell Bottom | "Tum Aaogey" | Armaan Malik | Rashmi Virag | |
| 2022 | Radhe Shyam | Jaan Hai Meri | Armaan Malik | Rashmi Virag | Bilingual Telugu-Hindi film; Hindi version only |
| 2022 | Radhe Shyam | "Labon Pe Naam" | Armaan Malik | Rashmi Virag | Bilingual Telugu-Hindi film; Hindi version only |
| 2022 | Radhe Shyam | "Jaan Hai Meri (Lofi)" | Armaan Malik | Rashmi Virag | Bilingual Telugu-Hindi film; Hindi version only |
| 2022 | Hurdang | "Kya Yehi Pyaar Hai" | Armaan Malik | Rashmi Virag | Original by R.D. Burman from Rocky (1981) |
| 2022 | Bachchan Pandey | "Heer Ranjhanaa" | Arijit Singh, Shreya Ghoshal | Kumaar | |
| 2022 | Nikamma | "Killer" | Mika Singh, Amaal Mallik | Kumaar | |
| 2022 | Maarrich | "Ja Ne Ja" | Sunidhi Chauhan | Rashmi Virag | |
| 2023 | Kisi Ka Bhai Kisi Ki Jaan | "Jee Rahe The Hum (Falling in Love)" | Salman Khan | Shabbir Ahmed | |
| 2024 | Vedaa | "Zaroorat Se Zyada" | Arijit Singh | Kunaal Vermaa | |
| 2024 | Vedaa | "Zaroorat Se Zyada (Female)" | Shreya Ghoshal | Kunaal Vermaa | |
| 2024 | Vedaa | "Zaroorat Se Zyada (Duet)" | Arijit Singh, Shreya Ghoshal | Kunaal Vermaa | |
| 2024 | The Miranda Brothers | "Be My Mehbooba" | Darshan Raval, Neeti Mohan | Kumaar | JioCinema film |
| 2024 | Bhool Bhulaiyaa 3 | "Ami Je Tomar 3.0" | Shreya Ghoshal | Sameer | |
| 2024 | Bhool Bhulaiyaa 3 | "Ami Je Tomar 3.0 (Male)" | Sonu Nigam | Sameer | |
| 2025 | Love in Vietnam | "Bade Din Huye" | Armaan Malik | Rashmi Virag | |
| 2025 | Love in Vietnam | "Jeena Nahi" | Armaan Malik | Rashmi Virag | |
| 2026 | Awarapan 2 | "Yeh Awarapan" | Arijit Singh | Rashmi Virag | |
| 2026 | Awarapan 2 | "Yeh Awarapan" (Amaal Malik Version) | Amaal Malik | Rashmi Virag | |

=== As a singer ===
Key
| † | Denotes films that have not yet been released |

| Year | Film/Album | Song(s) | Co-singer(s) | Lyricist | Notes |
|---|---|---|---|---|---|
| 2015 | Hero | O khuda | Palak Muchhal | Kumaar | Composed by himself |
| 2016 | Force 2 | Catch Me If U Can | Solo | | Composed by himself |
| 2017 | Noor | Gulabi 2.0 | Tulsi Kumar, Yash Narvekar | | Composed by himself |
| 2017 | Badrinath Ki Dulhania | Aashiq Surrender Hua | Shreya Ghoshal | Shabbir Ahmed | Composed by himself |
| 2017 | Mubarakan | The Goggle Song | Tulsi Kumar, Sonu Nigam, Armaan Malik | Kumaar | Composed by himself |
| 2019 | T-Series Mixtape season 2 | Main Rahoon Ya Naa Rahoon/Dil Kyun Yeh Mera | Prakriti Kakar | | |
| 2020 | Tu Mera Nahi | | Solo | Rashmi Virag | Debut as a singer & performer |
| 2021 | Saina | Parinda | Solo | Manoj Muntashir | Composed by himself |
| 2021 | Unacademy Unwind With MTV | Hasi Ban Gaye & Jaadu Teri Nazar | HBG (Armaan Malik) JTN (Single) | Kunaal Vermaa and Anand Bakshi | Recreated By Aditya |
| 2021 | Pyaar...Ek Tarfaa | | Shreya Ghoshal | Manoj Muntashir | Composed by himself |
| 2022 | Tujhe Chaahta Hoon Kyun | | Solo | Kunaal Vermaa | Composed by himself |
| 2022 | Chalo Theek Hai | | Solo | Kaushal Kishore | Composed by himself |
| 2022 | Nikamma | Killer | Mika Singh | Kumaar | Composed by himself |
| 2023 | Mohabbat | | Solo | Vayu | Composed by himself |
| 2025 | Kyun Mujhse Door Tha | | Solo | Kunaal Vermaa | Composed by himself |
| 2026 | Yahin Guzaar Doon | | Shreya Ghoshal | Kunaal Vermaa | Composed by himself |

=== Score ===
- Saina -Background score

=== Singles ===
| Year | Song(s) | Singer' |
|---|---|---|
| 2015 | "Zindagi Aa Raha Hoon Main" | Atif Aslam |
| 2015 | "Chal Wahan Jaate Hain" | Arijit Singh |
| 2015 | "Main Rahoon Ya Na Rahoon " | Armaan Malik |
| 2015 | "Wedding Da Season" | Neha Kakkar and Mika Singh |
| 2016 | "Tum Ho Toh Lagta Hai" | Shaan |
| 2016 | "Chand Chuppa Badal Mein" | Armaan Malik |
| 2017 | "Aaja Na Ferrari Mein" | Armaan Malik |
| 2017 | "Paas Aao" | Armaan Malik and Prakriti Kakar |
| 2018 | "Ghar Se Nikalte Hi" | Armaan Malik |
| 2018 | "Ready to Move" | Armaan Malik |
| 2019 | "Tera Shehar" | Mohd. Kalam |
| 2020 | "Zara Thehro" | Armaan Malik |
| 2020 | "Dil Ko Maine Di Kasam" | Arijit Singh |
| 2021 | "Barsaat" | Armaan Malik |
| 2021 | "Tum Yun Hi Kabhi" | Palak Muchhal |

== Television ==
| Year | Show | Episode | Role | Notes | Ref. |
|---|---|---|---|---|---|
| 2015 | The Kapil Sharma Show | Season 1, episode 15 | Guest | | |
| 2017 | The Drama Company | Episode 23 | Guest | | |
| 2019 | No. 1 Yaari Jam | Episode 2 | Guest | | |
| 2019 | The Kapil Sharma Show | Season 2, Episode 56 | Guest | | |
| 2019 | Sa Re Ga Ma Pa Li'l Champs 2019 | | Judge | | |
| 2020 | The Love Laugh Live Show | Season 2, Episode 13 | Guest | | |
| 2021 | Unacademy Unwind with MTV | | Guest | | |
| 2022 | Ravivaar With Star Parivaar | | Host | | |
| 2025 | Bigg Boss 19 | | Contestant | 4th runner up | |
| 2026 | Laughter Chefs – Unlimited Entertainment | | Guest | | |

== Awards and nominations ==
| Year | Award | Category | Nominated work | Film | Result | Ref(s) |
|---|---|---|---|---|---|---|
| 2015 | Mirchi Music Awards | Album of The Year | Roy (soundtrack) | Roy | Nominated | |
| 2015 | Mirchi Music Awards | Music Composer of The Year | "Sooraj Dooba Hain" | Roy | Nominated | |
| 2015 | Mirchi Music Awards | Upcoming Music Composer of The Year | "Sooraj Dooba Hain" | Roy | Won | |
| 2015 | Mirchi Music Awards | Upcoming Music Composer of The Year | "Main Hoon Hero Tera (Salman Khan Version)" | Hero | Nominated | |
| 2015 | Mirchi Music Awards | Upcoming Male Vocalist of The Year | "O Khuda" | Hero | Nominated | |
| 2016 | Mirchi Music Awards | Album of The Year | Kapoor & Sons (soundtrack) | Kapoor & Sons | Nominated | |
| 2017 | Mirchi Music Awards | Music Composer of the Year | "Aashiq Surrender Hua" | Badrinath Ki Dulhania | Won | |
| 2018 | Mirchi Music Awards | Listener's Choice Album of the Year | Sonu Ke Titu Ki Sweety (soundtrack) | Sonu Ke Titu Ki Sweety | Won | |
| 2020 | Mirchi Music Awards | Listener's Choice Album of the Year | Kabir Singh (soundtrack) | Kabir Singh | Won | |
| 2020 | Filmfare Award for Best Music Director | Best Music Director | Kabir Singh (soundtrack) | Kabir Singh | Won | |
| 2020 | IIFA Awards | Best Music Director | Kabir Singh (soundtrack) | Kabir Singh | Won | |
| 2022 | Global Excellence Awards | Most Loved Musician Of the Decade | Special Award | —N/a | Won | |
| 2026 | Pinkvilla Screen and Style Icons Awards | Best Reality Show Personality - Male | Bigg Boss 19 | —N/a | Won | |
