= Zindagi Aa Raha Hoon Main =

2015 Hindi song

- Official poster

Single by Atif Aslam
- Language: Hindi
- Released: 13 May 2015
- Studio: Paperdoll Entertainment Production
- Genre: Indian pop, Energetic
- Length: 7:40 (video); 4:47 (audio)
- Label: T-Series
- Composer: Amaal Mallik
- Lyricist: Manoj Muntashir
- Producers: Armaan Malik, Abhijit Vaghani

Atif Aslam singles chronology
"Zindagi Aa Raha Hoon Main" (2015)	"I'm Alive" (2016)

"Zindagi Aa Raha Hoon Main" (transl. Life, I'm coming) is a 2015 Hindi song. It is sung by the Pakistani singer Atif Aslam, composed by Amaal Mallik, and lyrics by Manoj Muntashir. The single was produced by Bhushan Kumar, presented by Gulshan Kumar, and is a production of Paperdoll Entertainment Production under T-Series. This song's production was the first time that Aslam, Mallik, and Muntashir had worked together.

== Background ==
The inspiration for this song is attributed to Tiger Shroff, who said that he received admiration from young fans and that it was the beginning of his new life after his debut film, Heropanti. He said the song is about celebrating his new life with the young fans as they had accepted him graciously, and it was his way of giving back to them. He further said: "I took the idea to Ahmed sir, and he loved it. He started telling me, 'I will shoot it this way and that way.' After discussing it, we went to Bhushan Kumar, and he also loved the idea. This is how 'Zindagi Aa Raha Hoon Main’ was born.” Atif Aslam said something similar in an interview with 9XE.com.

According to Aslam, the single is different to the softer romantic songs he had done in the past, as it is more energetic. Atif Aslam approved of the way Kumar has marketed his songs over the years, and T-Series agreed to produce this song based on a one-time contract.

== Pre-release ==
Before filming the music video, Shroff was trained by dance experts in Thailand.

Atif Aslam stated that this song would not be preachy. "It's just about how you enjoy your life. Whatever you are doing, just enjoy yourself."

== Release and reception ==
The song was released on 13 May 2015 by T-Series on YouTube.

Shroff said:

Bhushan Kumar's music label T-Series released and mounted it and promoted it like a film. It has amazing choreography by Ahmed Khan and my own dance teacher Paresh sir. I owe a lot to the fans who made my first film Heropanti superhit. I don't have a lot of fans till now, but I dedicate this song to all those who supported and liked Heropanti.

In an entertainment site interview, Shroff said: “I'm feeling blessed that everyone has accepted me very warmly and graciously. They have been really kind. I am very happy since I never expected such an overwhelming response so early on.” India.com posted, "Visually or musically this composition has not impressed us much. While Atif looks his usual stiff self, Tiger doesn't go beyond his usual cool moves. This track looks like the extension of the song Raat Bhar from Heropanti as the glitter, the sparkle, and dance moves look the same with a slightly different theme infused."

== Music video ==
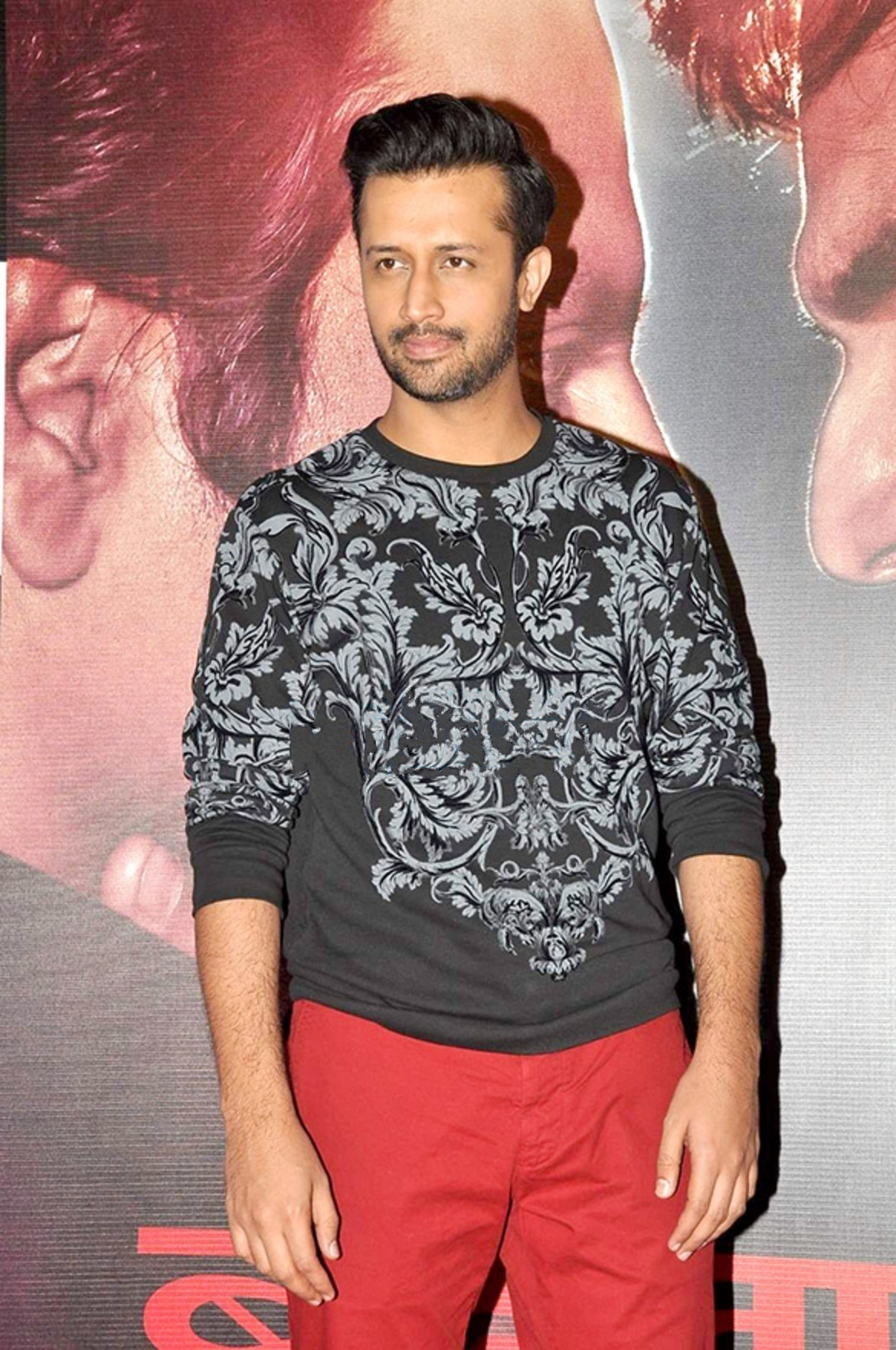
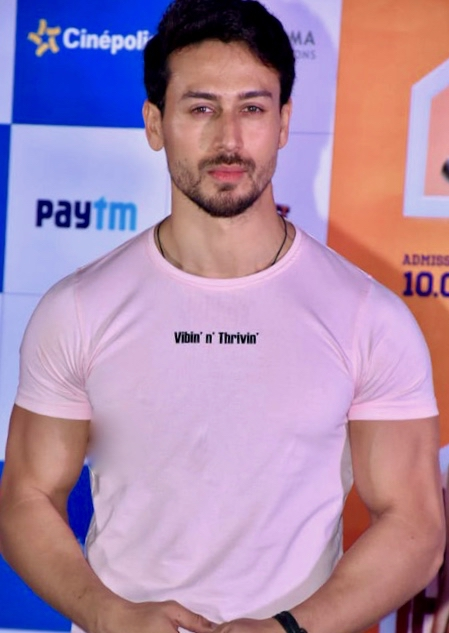
The song's music video features Atif Aslam and Tiger Shroff, pictured top and bottom, respectively.

The video was shot in Mumbai and directed by choreographer Ahmed Khan. It features Aslam and Shroff. Set in a college, the video begins with all students hanging around quietly, jaded and bored. Shroff enters hiding his face. A security guard stops him but, recognizing him, lets him go. He tells them he is entering the college to teach the students a vital lesson: "Live life!" Everyone begins to notice him. He starts dancing and performs stunts. The students, affected by Shroff's energy, begin dancing with him. Shroff points to Aslam heading towards them from a distance, who embraces Shroff and dances for a short time. Aslam sings and is seen sitting with children laughing. He then leaves and says goodbye to Shroff, who then says "Life, I'm coming."

== Credits ==
=== Audio ===
- Song – Zindagi Aa Raha Hoon Main
- Singer – Atif Aslam
- Music Composed by – Amaal Mallik
- Lyrics by – Manoj Muntashir

=== Video ===
- Starred by – Tiger Shroff and Atif Aslam
- Presented by – Gulshan Kumar
- Produced by – Bhushan Kumar
- Directed by – Ahmed Khan

=== Additional ===
- Song Programmed by – Abhijit Vaghani & Armaan Malik
- Additional Programming – Amaal Mallik & Apeiruss.
- Editor – Nitin F.C.P
- DOP – Bashalal Syed
- Song Mixed & Mastered by – Eric Pillai @ Future Sound Of Bombay
- Production Companies – T-Series and Paperdoll Entertainment Production
- Music Label – T-Series

Note: All credits adapted from YouTube.

== Listings ==
Video
No.	Title	Length
1.	"Zindagi Aa Raha Hoon Main"	7:39

Audio
No.	Title	Length
1.	"Zindagi Aa Raha Hoon Main"	4:47

== Release history ==
Country	Date	Type	Format(s)	Duration	Label	Ref.
India	8 May 2015	Video	Digital download	7:39	Super Cassettes Industries Private Limited	
India	13 May 2020	Audio	Digital download	4:47	Super Cassettes Industries Private Limited	
India	22 May 2020	Lyrical	Digital download	4:47	Super Cassettes Industries Private Limited	
