= Roy (2015 film) =

2015 Indian film by Vikramjit Singh

- Theatrical release poster
- Directed by: Vikramjit Singh
- Written by: Vikramjit Singh
- Produced by: Bhushan Kumar; Divya Khosla Kumar; Krishan Kumar
- Starring: Arjun Rampal; Jacqueline Fernandez; Ranbir Kapoor
- Cinematography: Kiran Deohans
- Edited by: Dipika Kalra
- Music by: Songs: Ankit Tiwari; Amaal Mallik; Meet Bros Anjjan; Background Score: Sanjoy Chowdhury
- Production company: T-Series
- Distributed by: AA Films (India); Magic Cloud Media & Entertainment (Overseas)
- Release date: 13 February 2015
- Running time: 140 minutes
- Country: India
- Language: Hindi
- Budget: ₹50 crore Note: figure contains print and advertising costs.
- Box office: est. ₹56 crore

Roy is a 2015 Indian Hindi-language romantic drama film directed by debutant Vikramjit Singh and produced by Bhushan Kumar, Krishan Kumar, Divya Khosla Kumar and Ajay Kapoor under Freeway Pictures. It features Arjun Rampal and Jacqueline Fernandez in the lead roles with Ranbir Kapoor in the title role. Shernaz Patel, Rajit Kapur and Shibani Dandekar appear in supporting roles. Anupam Kher appears in a cameo. The film follows a film director struggling to find meaning in his work and personal life.

The film had its premiere in Dubai on 12 February 2015 and was released worldwide on 13 February 2015 to negative reviews for the film’s story, screenplay, direction and slow narration, but praised the performances (especially Rampal’s and Kapoor’s), cinematography, locations, soundtrack, and the film’s dramatic score.

== Plot ==
Kabir Garewal (Arjun Rampal), a casanova film maker and screenwriter, is making multiple films (GUNS Trilogy) based on a thief's life and robberies. The first two films have been highly successful. In order to shoot the third part of the trilogy, he goes to Malaysia, where he meets a London-based film maker Ayesha (Jacqueline Fernandez). Kabir and Ayesha get friendly and soon fall in love. When Ayesha finds out about Kabir's casanova past and believes him to be unchanged, she breaks up with him and returns to London. Dejected, Kabir goes into depression and returns to Mumbai, leaving his film incomplete. After several attempts, Kabir is unable to find the perfect climax for his film. On his assistant Meera's (Shernaz Patel) suggestion, Kabir attends a film festival as part of the jury, where Ayesha's film is being screened. Ayesha thinks Kabir is stalking her and asks him to stay away from her. After his father's (Anupam Kher) death followed by him being sued by his film's financiers, Kabir decides to move on and complete his film.

In the parallel story of imaginary characters in Kabir's film Guns 3, an infamous Roy (Ranbir Kapoor) is a mysterious international art thief whom no country seems to be able to get their hands on, including Detective Wadia (Rajit Kapur). On his new assignment, Roy goes to an unknown foreign land to steal an expensive painting only to find that its owner is the beautiful Tia (also played by Jacqueline Fernandez). Tia lives alone in a huge mansion where the painting is kept. So, Roy tries to befriend Tia during an art auction and soon impresses her with his charm. Sparks fly between them and both start spending time together, giving Roy entry into the mansion. Finding the right opportunity one night, Roy runs away with the painting, leaving Tia heartbroken. Roy later regrets this, as he realises he has fallen for Tia and decides to return the painting to her. After a small clash with the painting's new owner, Roy manages to get it back. On receiving the painting, Tia realises that Roy is now a changed man and forgives him.

Meanwhile, Kabir's film Guns 3 is released and is hugely successful at the box office. In the end, Kabir proposes to Ayesha and they reunite, just like Roy and Tia in Kabir's film. The movie ends with Roy and Tia walking together over a bridge, similar to the one in the stolen painting.

== Cast ==
- Ranbir Kapoor as Roy, fictional character of a mysterious art thief whom no one has gotten their hands on
- Arjun Rampal as Kabir Grewal, a famous film maker and screenwriter who tries to find Roy's true purpose and Ayesha's love interest.
- Jacqueline Fernandez as Ayesha Aamir, a film director and Kabir's love interest & Tia Desai, an art painter and Roy's art thief friend.
- Abhijeet Singh as Raj, a Master cop
- Shernaz Patel as Meera Pandit
- Anupam Kher as Mr. Grewal (cameo), Kabir's father who later dies
- Rajit Kapur as Detective D. S. Wadia
- Asif Basra as Abra Rizvi, an Art Dealer
- Shibani Dandekar as Zoya
- Barun Chanda as Roy's boss
- Kaizaad Kotwal as Navrose Irani
- Cyrus Brocha as a Talk-show host
- Mandana Karimi as Pia (cameo), Kabir's girlfriend

== Production ==
The film was produced on a budget of ₹400 million (US$4.2 million), which included ₹300 million (US$3.1 million) for production and ₹100 million (US$1.0 million) for P&A. The film recovered ₹250 million (US$2.6 million) from satellite rights, ₹60 million (US$620,000) from music rights and ₹60 million (US$620,000) from overseas rights.

=== Promotions and marketing ===
The trailer of the film was released on 17 December 2014 and passed over 1 million views on YouTube within 24 hours. The film was promoted at famous reality shows like Bigg Boss and Comedy Nights with Kapil.

== Soundtrack ==
The songs of Roy are composed by Ankit Tiwari, Meet Bros Anjjan and Amaal Mallik, "Sooraj Dooba Hai" and "Tu Hai Ki Nahi Whistle" become Hit in 2015. While the lyrics are written by Kumaar, Sandeep Nath and Abhendra Kumar Upadhyay. The music rights for the film were acquired by T-Series. Sanjoy Chowdhury composed the film score.

The first single, "Sooraj Dooba Hain", sung by Arijit Singh, Aditi Singh Sharma and composed by Amaal Mallik, was released on 21 December 2014. The complete album was released digitally on 14 January 2015. An additional Remix EP was released on 28 January 2015.

== Reception ==
=== Critical reception ===
The film received highly negative reviews from critics. Review aggregator site Rotten Tomatoes reports a 0% approval rating based on 5 reviews, with an average rating of 3.3 out of 10. Bollywood Hungama reviewed the film positively with a 3.5 out of 5 rating, and while noting that the film was slow-paced and long, praised the performances, soundtrack and screenplay. On the other hand, Rajeev Masand on ibnlive gave it only one star, saying "The film limps lethargically and collapses in a predictable twist ending." Rahul Desai and Aasir Tavawalla were even inspired to create a campaign called "Aakraman on Roy" to get their money back from the filmmakers.

=== Box office ===
The film grossed ₹580 million (US$6.0 million) worldwide.

== Awards ==
Award	Date of ceremony (Note: A link to the article about awards ceremony, if available, is provided.)	Category	Recipient(s) and nominee(s)	Nominated work	Result	Ref(s)
Filmfare Awards	15 January 2016	Best Music Director	Amaal Mallik, Ankit Tiwari and Meet Bros Anjjan	Roy	Won	
Filmfare Awards	15 January 2016	Best Lyricist	Kumaar	"Sooraj Dooba Hain"	Nominated	
Filmfare Awards	15 January 2016	Best Playback Singer – Male	Arijit Singh	"Sooraj Dooba Hain"	Won	
Filmfare Awards	15 January 2016	Best Playback Singer – Male	Ankit Tiwari	"Tu Hai Ki Nahi"	Nominated	
GiMA Awards	6 April 2016	Best Film Album	Amaal Mallik, Ankit Tiwari and Meet Bros Anjjan	Roy	Nominated	
GiMA Awards	6 April 2016	Best Film Song	Amaal Mallik, Kumaar, Arijit Singh and Aditi Singh Sharma	"Sooraj Dooba Hain"	Nominated	
GiMA Awards	6 April 2016	Best Music Director	Amaal Mallik, Ankit Tiwari and Meet Bros Anjjan	Roy	Won	
GiMA Awards	6 April 2016	Best Lyricist	Kumaar	"Sooraj Dooba Hain"	Nominated	
GiMA Awards	6 April 2016	Best Playback Singer – Male	Arijit Singh	"Sooraj Dooba Hain"	Nominated	
GiMA Awards	6 April 2016	Best Playback Singer – Female	Kanika Kapoor	"Chittiyaan Kalaiyaan"	Nominated	
IIFA Awards	26 June 2016	Best Music Direction	Amaal Mallik, Ankit Tiwari and Meet Bros Anjjan	Roy	Won	
IIFA Awards	26 June 2016	Best Playback Singer – Female	Kanika Kapoor	"Chittiyaan Kalaiyaan"	Nominated	
IIFA Awards	26 June 2016	Best Playback Singer – Male	Arijit Singh	"Sooraj Dooba Hain"	Nominated	
Mirchi Music Awards	29 February 2016	Song of the Year	Amaal Mallik, Kumaar, Arijit Singh and Aditi Singh Sharma	"Sooraj Dooba Hain"	Nominated	
Mirchi Music Awards	29 February 2016	Album of the Year	Amaal Mallik, Ankit Tiwari, and Meet Bros Anjjan	Roy	Nominated	
Mirchi Music Awards	29 February 2016	Male Vocalist of the Year	Arijit Singh	"Sooraj Dooba Hain"	Nominated	
Mirchi Music Awards	29 February 2016	Music Composer of the Year	Amaal Mallik	"Sooraj Dooba Hain"	Nominated	
Mirchi Music Awards	29 February 2016	Listeners' Choice Album of the Year	Amaal Mallik, Ankit Tiwari and Meet Bros Anjjan	Roy	Won	
Mirchi Music Awards	29 February 2016	Upcoming Composer of The Year	Amaal Mallik	"Sooraj Dooba Hain"	Won	
Mirchi Music Awards	29 February 2016	Upcoming Lyricist of The Year	Abhendra Kumar Upadhyay	"Boond Boond"	Won	
Mirchi Music Awards	29 February 2016	Upcoming Lyricist of The Year	Abhendra Kumar Upadhyay	"Tu Hai Ki Nahi"	Nominated	
Screen Awards	8 January 2016	Best Music Director	Amaal Mallik, Ankit Tiwari and Meet Bros Anjjan	Roy	Won	
Star Guild Awards	1 January 2016	Best Music Director	Amaal Mallik, Ankit Tiwari and Meet Bros Anjjan	Roy	Won	
Star Guild Awards	1 January 2016	Best Lyricist	Kumaar	"Sooraj Dooba Hain"	Nominated	
Star Guild Awards	1 January 2016	Best Male Playback Singer	Arijit Singh	"Sooraj Dooba Hain"	Nominated	
Star Guild Awards	1 January 2016	Best Male Playback Singer	Ankit Tiwari	"Tu Hai Ki Nahi"	Nominated	
Star Guild Awards	1 January 2016	Best Female Playback Singer	Kanika Kapoor	"Chittiyaan Kalaiyaan"	Nominated	
Zee Cine Awards	20 February 2016	Best Music	Amaal Mallik	"Sooraj Dooba Hain"	Nominated	
Zee Cine Awards	20 February 2016	Best Playback Singer – Male	Arijit Singh	"Sooraj Dooba Hain"	Won	
