= IIFA Award for Best Music Director =

Indian film award

- Awarded for: Best Performance by a Music Director
- Country: India
- Presented by: International Indian Film Academy
- First award: A.R. Rahman, Taal (2000)
- Currently held by: Ram Sampath, Laapataa Ladies (2025)
- Website: iifa.com

The IIFA Award for Best Music Director is chosen by the viewers and the winner is announced at the actual ceremony.

== Superlatives ==
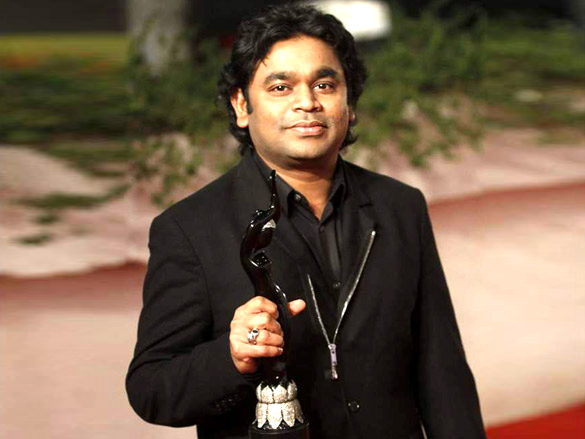
A.R. Rahman with his award of 2012 for the film Rockstar. He holds the record of maximum wins in this category.

Category	Name	Superlative	Notes
Most awards	A. R. Rahman	8 awards	
Most nominations without a win	Anu Malik	7 nominations	–

== List of winners ==
A. R. Rahman (8 wins) is the most awarded artist, followed by Amaal Mallik (4) and Pritam (4), Shankar–Ehsaan–Loy (3). Anu Malik is the artist with most nominations (7) without a win.

The winners are listed below:

Year	Music Director	Film
2000	A.R. Rahman	Taal
2001	Rajesh Roshan	Kaho Naa... Pyaar Hai
2002	A.R. Rahman	Lagaan
2003	A.R. Rahman	Saathiya
2004	Shankar–Ehsaan–Loy	Kal Ho Naa Ho
2005	Madan Mohan	Veer-Zaara
2006	Shankar–Ehsaan–Loy	Bunty Aur Babli
2007	A.R. Rahman	Rang De Basanti
2008	A.R. Rahman	Guru
2009	A.R. Rahman	Jodhaa Akbar
2010	Pritam	Love Aaj Kal
2011	Sajid–Wajid & Lalit Pandit	Dabangg
2012	A.R. Rahman	Rockstar
2013	Pritam	Barfi!
2014	Mithoon, Ankit Tiwari, Jeet Ganguly	Aashiqui 2
2015	Shankar–Ehsaan–Loy	2 States
2016	Amaal Mallik, Ankit Tiwari, Meet Bros Anjjan	Roy
2017	Pritam	Ae Dil Hai Mushkil
2018	Amaal Mallik, Tanishk Bagchi, Akhil Sachdeva	Badrinath Ki Dulhania
2019	Amaal Mallik, Guru Randhawa, Rochak Kohli, Saurabh-Vaibhav, Yo Yo Honey Singh, Zack Knight	Sonu Ke Titu Ki Sweety
2020	Mithoon, Amaal Mallik, Vishal Mishra, Sachet–Parampara and Akhil Sachdeva	Kabir Singh
2021	AWARDS FUNCTION WAS SUSPENDED DUE TO COVID-19 PANDEMIC
2022	A.R. Rahman	Atrangi Re
2023	Pritam	Brahmāstra: Part One – Shiva
2024	Pritam, Vishal Mishra, Manan Bhardwaj, Shreyas Puranik, Jaani, Bhupinder Babbal, Ashim Kemson, Harshavardhan Rameshwar	Animal
2025	Ram Sampath	Laapataa Ladies

== See also ==
- IIFA Awards
- Bollywood
- Cinema of India
