= Sooraj Dooba Hain =

Song performed by Arijit Singh, Aditi Singh Sharma

- Cover of the song, featuring actors Jacqueline Fernandez, Ranbir Kapoor, Arjun Rampal

Single by Arijit Singh, Aditi Singh Sharma

from the album Roy
- Released: 22 December 2014
- Genre: Filmi; Pop
- Length: 4:24
- Label: T-Series
- Songwriter: Kumaar
- Producer: Bhushan Kumar

Music video
- "Sooraj Dooba Hain" on YouTube

"Sooraj Dooba Hain" (transl. The sun has set) is a Hindi song from the 2015 Bollywood film, Roy. The song was composed by Amaal Mallik with lyrics by Kumaar, and is sung by Arijit Singh and Aditi Singh Sharma. The music video features actors Jacqueline Fernandez, Ranbir Kapoor, and Arjun Rampal.

The music video for the song was officially released on 19 December 2014 and was exclusively released on Hungama.com. The single of the song was digitally released on 22 December 2014. Commercially, the song fared well, topping the iTunes charts in India and Cambodia, along with the 91.9 Friends FM weekly chart.

== Background ==
The song was composed by Amaal Mallik who made his debut in Bollywood as a music director with the 2014 film Jai Ho. Initially, producer Bhushan Kumar told Mallik that he was looking for a youthful party song for the film. He offered the chance to five other music composers, intending to select the best track. Mallik finalized a rough version of "Sooraj Dooba Hain" with a few lines written, which he had originally composed three years ago and had been rejected by many film producers. Kumar, associated with producing the film, had heard the version along with other tracks Mallik had composed and wanted to hear the final version of the song, for which Kumaar wrote the lyrics. Mallik was not aware that the song was intended for the film Roy until Kumar showed him the poster of the film for which he had composed the song.

== Writing and recording ==
The director of the film, Vikramjit Singh, gave Mallik an insight into Ranbir Kapoor's character, a carefree person who believes one should forget everything and live freely. Singh wanted the track to be about being young and carefree, similar to songs played in clubs. With the first verse of the song written by Kumaar, which was "cracked" in fifteen minutes, Mallik realized that they "hit upon something really special". According to him the song is something everyone in the world can relate to and it is "a party song with a simple melody, Electronic Dance Music beats and non-crass lyrics". The song is all about living the present moment with someone special.

The song is sung by Arijit Singh and Aditi Singh Sharma. For the male vocals of the song, Mallik wanted a voice that does not sing many peppy numbers. Regarding the vocals by Singh, Mallik stated: "Arjit was one name that came to my mind, and he too was extremely happy when he heard the song. He told me that he wished to maintain his style and will add my attitude to the song". Mallik called Sharma and informed her of the song, and mentioned that he would email it to her before recording it at the studio; "Knowing that Amaal is an absolute king at EDM, I remember opening the email with immense excitement as he had mentioned it's a dance track [and] it's a duet with Arijit Singh". According to Sharma, she fell in love with the track instantly, and kept listening to it over and over again. At the studio Mallik briefed her to do improvisations as per her wish; "After my solo parts were done, we worked on ideas for suitable harmonies for Arijit's lines, for the chorus as well". The song marks the first time Sharma sings for the lead actress of the film, Jacqueline Fernandez.

The song is noted as the first time Fernandez has been paired against Kapoor and Rampal. It is choreographed by Ahmed Khan.

== Picturization and marketing ==
The released music video features the three leading actors from the film Jacqueline Fernandez, Arjun Rampal and Ranbir Kapoor, although the film version of the song features Rampal and Fernandez only. On 18 December 2014, stills of the video, which show Fernandez romancing both Kapoor and Rampal, were released. The song is picturized on a contrast of locations from long drives, to quaint beaches to energetic clubs. The song is shot in scenic locations from Malaysia.

The music video shows Fernandez shaking her leg on the dance floor. She is accompanied by Rampal, who matches dance steps with her while Kapoor "looks intense and cut off" in the song. It also shows Fernandez romance with Rampal and Kapoor through various snippets from the film. In the video, Rampal is seen donning a fedora hat, while Fernandez dons two avatars, as she plays a dual role in the film. When in the same frame with Kapoor, she is seen sporting a faux bob hair style, but she is dressed very casually with long tresses, accessories including bands and bracelets, and a tattoo on her neck and wrist when in the company of Rampal. In one scene, Fernandez is seen wearing a "long chain" on her neck which was designed by herself.

Since June 2014, Kapoor has been the brand ambassador for the AskMe mobile application. As one of their marketing strategy, AskMe signed a marketing and promotion deal with T-Series for "Sooraj Dooba Hain" which also features Kapoor in the video, has the words 'Ask Me' incorporated in the lyrics at four places. Apart from the lyrics, the video also shows product placement for the company in the background, when Fernandez and Rampal dance to the beats of the song in an uptown club.

== Release and response ==
A first look at the song was published on 18 December 2014 by The Times of India. The music video was officially released on 19 December 2014, through the YouTube channel of T-Series. The song was exclusively released on Hungama.com and was available for the next three days from the time of release. On 22 December, the full song was released digitally as a single, becoming available on various online music-streaming platforms. The music video of the song was the first track released from the film.

Apart from topping the music charts, the song was considered as "the party anthem of the season". Within 24 hours of release, the song received 650,000 views on YouTube.

=== Chart performance ===
Chart	Peak position
The Times of India Mirchi Top 20 Chart	1
Hits FM (Nepal) Hits X-press Top 10 Chart	1

== Critical reception ==
The song received mostly positive responses from music critics.

Bollywood Hungama's Rajiv Vijayakar calling it a "nice celebratory song" appraised the "interesting and meaningful lyrics" by Kumaar and the vocals by Singh, though felt that; "it needed a lively and full-throated singer rather than Aditi Singh Sharma crooning with a put-on Westernized accent, and that too very superficially from her mouth". According to Joginder Tuteja from Rediff.com, Mallik deserves full marks for the track; "It's a beautiful tune with a good mix of rhythm and melody [...] and has a club sound but still makes for pleasant listening". Sankhayan Ghosh of The Indian Express was impressed with the arrangement of the tune, though he felt the song "shows a serious lack of imagination". Rucha Sharma from Daily News and Analysis wrote: "For a change, it's good to hear Arijit Singh singing happy tunes. Aditi Singh Sharma complements his voice very well".

Surabhi Redkar from Koimoi described the song as "an amazingly upbeat number that hooks you in right from the start". Redkar opining that "it is surely going to be one of the party songs of the year", complimented that Mallik composition has a lot of energy to "drive" to the dance floor. Kasmin Fernandes of The Times of India was entertained with the composition of the song and commented: "Singh's singing is endearing and Aditi Singh Sharma supports him ably. She takes over the reins in the alternate version which shows off her singing chops".

== Awards ==
Year	Award Ceremony	Category	Recipient	Result	Reference(s)
2015	Mirchi Music Awards	Song of the Year	–	Nominated	
2015	Mirchi Music Awards	Male Vocalist of the Year	Arijit Singh	Nominated	
2015	Mirchi Music Awards	Music Composer of the Year	Amaal Mallik	Nominated	
2015	Mirchi Music Awards	Upcoming Music Composer of The Year	Amaal Mallik	Won	

== Track listing and formats ==
- Digital single
1. "Sooraj Dooba Hain" – 4:24
- Original Motion Picture Soundtrack
1. "Sooraj Dooba Hain" – 4:24
2. "Sooraj Dooba Hain (Duet Version)" – 4:24
- Remix – EP
1. "Sooraj Dooba Hain (Remix)" – 4:35
