= Mirchi Music Award for Upcoming Music Composer of The Year =

Indian film music award

- Awarded for: Best musical contribution by a new composer
- Country: India
- Presented by: Radio Mirchi
- First award: Dhruv Ghanekar for all songs of Drona (2008 (1st))
- Currently held by: Shreyas Puranik for "Satranga" from Animal (2024 (16th))
- Website: Music Mirchi Awards Official Website

The Mirchi Music Award for Upcoming Music Composer of the Year is given by Radio Mirchi as a part of its annual Mirchi Music Awards for Hindi films, to recognise an upcoming music director who has delivered an outstanding performance in a film song. The award ceremony was started in 2008 to honour the best of Hindi film music.

== Winners and nominees ==
In the following table, the years are listed as per presenter's convention, and generally correspond to the year of film release in India. The ceremonies are always held the following year.

(Winners are listed first, highlighted in boldface.)

=== 2000s ===
Year	Nominees	Song	Film	Ref.
**2008** **(1st)**	**Dhruv Ghanekar**	**All songs**	**Drona**	
**2009** **(2nd)**	**Jeet Ganguly**	**"Bhor Bhayo"**	**Morning Walk**	

=== 2010s ===
Year	Nominees	Song	Film	Ref.
**2010** **(3rd)**	**Shiraz Uppal**	**"Rabba"**	**Aashayein**	
**2010** **(3rd)**	Bhadwai Village Mandali	"Mehngai Dayain"	Peepli Live	
**2010** **(3rd)**	Nageen Tanvir	"Chola Maati Ke Ram"	Peepli Live	
**2010** **(3rd)**	Sanjay Leela Bhansali	"Udi"	Guzaarish	
**2010** **(3rd)**	Tarun and Vinayak	"Rabba Rabba"	Allah Ke Banday	
**2011** **(4th)**	**Harshit Saxena**	**"Haal-e-Dil"**	**Murder 2**	
**2011** **(4th)**	Hitesh Sonik	"Baanwre"	Pyaar Ka Punchnama	
**2011** **(4th)**	Hitesh Sonik	"Life Bahot Simple Hai"	Stanley Ka Dabba	
**2011** **(4th)**	Krsna	"Jugni"	Tanu Weds Manu	
**2011** **(4th)**	Prasoon Joshi	"Saans Albeli"	Aarakshan	
**2012** **(5th)**	**Rochak Kohli and Ayushmann Khurrana**	**"Pani Da Rang (Male)"**	**Vicky Donor**	
**2012** **(5th)**	Anupam Amod	"Tera Deedar Hua"	Jannat 2	
**2012** **(5th)**	Anupam Amod	"Tera Deedar Hua (From The Heart)"	Jannat 2	
**2012** **(5th)**	Arko Pravo Mukherjee	"Abhi Abhi"	Jism 2	
**2012** **(5th)**	Donn and Bann	"Mar Jayian (Romantic)"	Vicky Donor	
**2013** **(6th)**	**Ankit Tiwari**	**"Sunn Raha Hai"**	**Aashiqui 2**	
**2014** **(7th)**	**Raj-Prakash**	**"Arziyaan"**	**Jigariyaa**	
**2014** **(7th)**	Gulraj Singh	"Pakeezah"	Ungli	
**2014** **(7th)**	Rabbi Ahmad and Adnan Dhool (Soch)	"Awari"	Ek Villain	
**2014** **(7th)**	Shashi Suman	"Ziddi Dil"	Mary Kom	
**2014** **(7th)**	Shivam Pathak	"Sukoon Mila"	Mary Kom	
**2015** **(8th)**	**Amaal Mallik**	**"Sooraj Dooba Hain"**	**Roy**	
**2015** **(8th)**	Amaal Mallik	"Main Hoon Hero Tera (Salman Khan Version)"	Hero	
**2015** **(8th)**	Ami Mishra	"Hasi (Male)"	Hamari Adhuri Kahani	
**2015** **(8th)**	Shreyas Puranik	"Gajanana"	Bajirao Mastani	
**2015** **(8th)**	Tanishk Bagchi and Vayu	"Banno"	Tanu Weds Manu: Returns	
**2016** **(9th)**	**Tanishk Bagchi**	**"Bolna"**	**Kapoor & Sons**	
**2016** **(9th)**	Asad Khan	"Rang Reza (Female)"	Beiimaan Love	
**2016** **(9th)**	Jasleen Royal	"Raatein"	Shivaay	
**2016** **(9th)**	Rohan Vinayak	"Maula"	Nil Battey Sannata	
**2016** **(9th)**	Tanishk Bagchi	"Allah Hu Allah"	Sarbjit	
**2017** **(10th)**	**JAM8**	**"Zaalima"**	**Raees**	
**2017** **(10th)**	Shashwat Sachdev	"Bajaake Tumba"	Phillauri	
**2017** **(10th)**	Shashwat Sachdev	"Sahiba"	Phillauri	
**2017** **(10th)**	Troy Ari	"Meherbaan"	Thodi Thodi Si Manmaaniyan	
**2017** **(10th)**	Vickey Prasad	"Hans Mat Pagli"	Toilet: Ek Prem Katha	
**2017** **(10th)**	Vishal Mishra	"Pyar Ho"	Munna Michael	
**2017** **(10th)**	Vishal Mishra	"Jaane De"	Qarib Qarib Singlle	
**2018** **(11th)**	**Niladri Kumar**	**"Aahista""**	**Laila Majnu**	
**2018** **(11th)**	Qaran	"Tareefan"	Veere Di Wedding	
**2018** **(11th)**	Prateek Kuhad	"Saansein"	Karwaan	
**2018** **(11th)**	Prateek Kuhad	"Kadam"	Karwaan	
**2019** **(12th)**	**Piyush Shankar**	**"Naina Yeh"**	**Article 15**	
**2019** **(12th)**	Spitfire	"Asli Hip Hop"	Gully Boy	
**2019** **(12th)**	Divine, Naezy & Sez on the Beat	"Mere Gully Mein"	Gully Boy	
**2019** **(12th)**	Gurmoh	"Deh Shiva"	Kesari	
**2019** **(12th)**	Payal Dev	"Tum Hi Aana"	Marjaavaan	
**2019** **(12th)**	Siddharth Amit Bhavsar	"Aaj Jaage Rehna"	Motichoor Chaknachoor	

=== 2020s ===
Year	Nominees	Song	Film	Ref.
**2021** **(14th)**	**Arijit Singh**	**"Thode Kam Ajnabi"**	**Pagglait**	
**2021** **(14th)**	Gurnazar	"Marjaawaan"	Bell Bottom	
**2021** **(14th)**	Gaurav Chatterji	"Phoonk Phoonk"	Ginny Weds Sunny	
**2021** **(14th)**	Arijit Singh	"Pagal"	Pagglait	
**2021** **(14th)**	Arijit Singh	"Pagglait"	Pagglait	
**2024** **(16th)**	**Shreyas Puranik**	**Satranga**	**Animal**	

== See also ==
- Mirchi Music Awards
- Bollywood
- Cinema of India
