= List of accolades received by Bajirao Mastani =

Accolades
Award	Wins	Nominations

Totals (Note: Certain award groups do not simply award one winner. They acknowledge several different recipients, have runners-up, and have third place. Since this is a specific recognition and is different from losing an award, runner-up mentions are considered wins in this award tally. For simplification and to avoid errors, each award in this list has been presumed to have had a prior nomination.)
- Wins: 79
- Nominations: 150

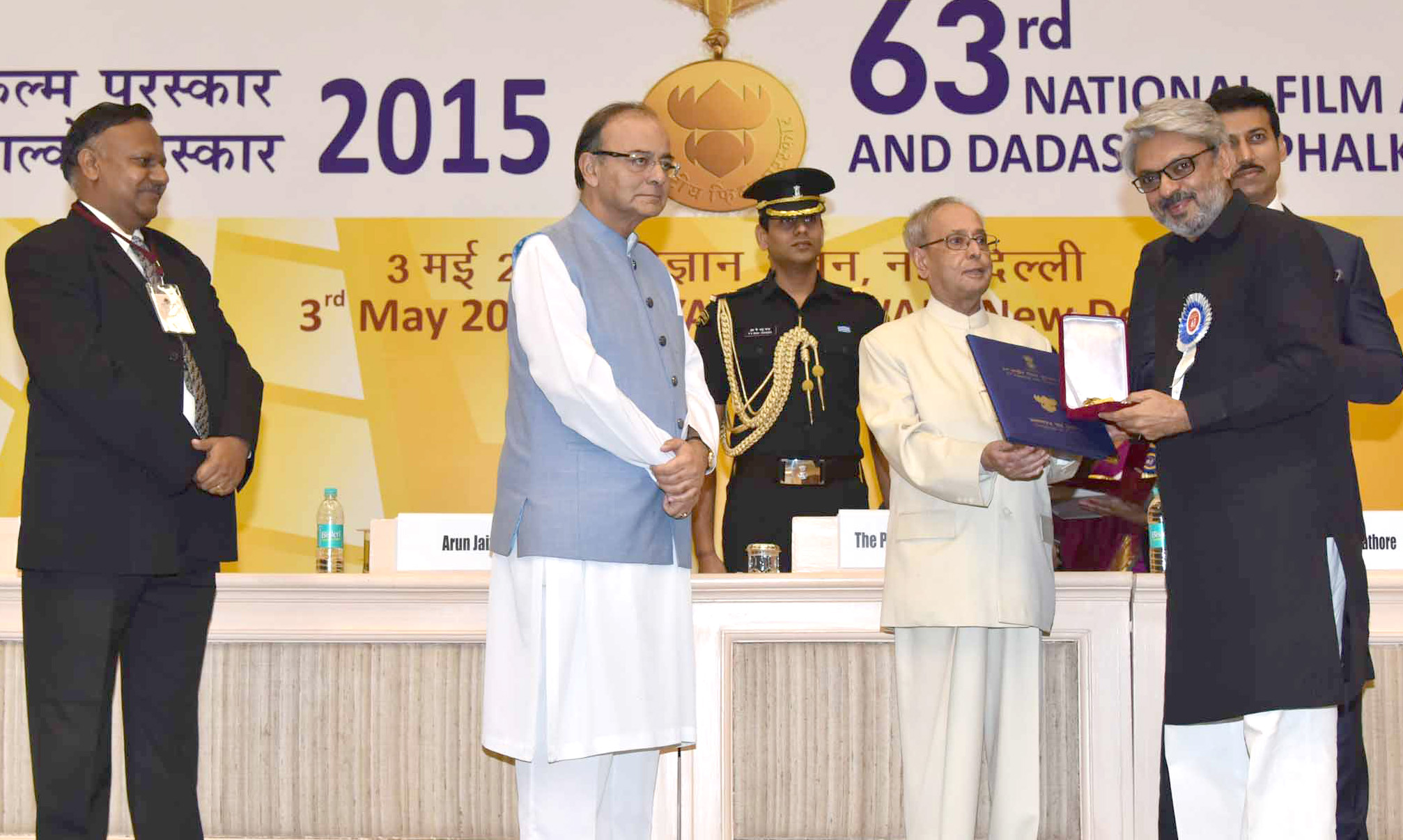
Bajirao Mastani won a total of seven National Film Awards at the 63rd National Film Awards including the National Film Award for Best Direction for Sanjay Leela Bhansali.

Bajirao Mastani is a 2015 Indian epic historical romance film directed and scored by Sanjay Leela Bhansali. It was a co-production between Bhansali Productions and Eros International. The film stars Ranveer Singh as Bajirao I, Deepika Padukone as Mastani, and Priyanka Chopra as Kashibai. Tanvi Azmi, Aditya Pancholi, Vaibbhav Tatwawdi and Milind Soman playing supporting roles. The screenplay was written by Prakash R. Kapadia, and the cinematography provided by Sudeep Chatterjee. Based on the Marathi novel Raau by Nagnath S. Inamdar, the film narrates the story of the Maratha Peshwa Bajirao and his second wife Mastani.

Made on a budget of ₹1.25 billion (US$13 million), the film was released on 18 December 2015 to positive reviews from critics. As of May 2016, Bajirao Mastani has grossed over ₹3.6 billion (US$37 million) at the box-office, becoming one of the highest-grossing Indian films of all time. The film garnered awards and nominations in a variety of categories with particular praise for Bhansali's direction and music, the performances of Chopra and Singh, its cinematography, art direction, and costume design.

At the 63rd National Film Awards, Bajirao Mastani received seven awards including Best Director for Bhansali, Best Supporting Actress for Azmi, Best Cinematography for Chatterjee, and Best Art Direction. It received the most nominations at the 61st Filmfare Awards with fourteen. Bajirao Mastani went on to win more awards than any other film at the ceremony with nine including Best Film, Best Director for Bhansali, Best Actor for Singh, and Best Supporting Actress for Chopra. The film received thirteen nominations at the 2015 Producers Guild Film Awards including Best Film, and Best Actress in a Leading Role for both Chopra, and Padukone. It won nine awards, the most at the ceremony, including Best Director for Bhansali, Best Actor for Singh, and Best Supporting Actress for Azmi. Bajirao Mastani received thirteen nominations at the 22nd Screen Awards including Best Film, and Best Director for Bhansali, and won seven including Best Actor for Singh, and Best Supporting Actress for Chopra. The film also won a leading thirteen awards (from seventeen nominations) at the 17th IIFA Awards including Best Director for Bhansali, Best Actor for Singh, and Best Supporting Actress for Chopra.

== Awards and nominations ==
Award	Date of Ceremony (Note: Date is linked to the article about the awards held that year, wherever possible.)	Category	Recipients	Result	Ref.
Asian Film Awards	17 March 2016	Best Film	Bajirao Mastani	Nominated	
Asian Film Awards	17 March 2016	Best Editing	Rajesh G. Pandey	Nominated	
Asian Film Awards	17 March 2016	Best Original Music	Sanjay Leela Bhansali	Nominated	
Asian Film Awards	17 March 2016	Best Costume Design	Anju Modi, Maxima Basu	Nominated	
Asian Film Awards	17 March 2016	Best Visual Effects	Prasad Sutar	Won	
Filmfare Awards	16 January 2016	Best Film	Bajirao Mastani	Won	
Filmfare Awards	16 January 2016	Best Director	Sanjay Leela Bhansali	Won	
Filmfare Awards	16 January 2016	Best Actor	Ranveer Singh	Won	
Filmfare Awards	16 January 2016	Best Actress	Deepika Padukone	Nominated	
Filmfare Awards	16 January 2016	Best Supporting Actress	Priyanka Chopra	Won	
Filmfare Awards	16 January 2016	Best Supporting Actress	Tanvi Azmi	Nominated	
Filmfare Awards	16 January 2016	Best Music Director	Sanjay Leela Bhansali	Nominated	
Filmfare Awards	16 January 2016	Best Female Playback Singer	Shreya Ghoshal (for song "Deewani Mastani")	Won	
Filmfare Awards	16 January 2016	Best Art Direction	Saloni Dhatrak, Sriram Iyengar, Sujeet Sawant	Won	
Filmfare Awards	16 January 2016	Best Costume Design	Anju Modi, Maxima Basu	Won	
Filmfare Awards	16 January 2016	Best Action	Sham Kaushal	Won	
Filmfare Awards	16 January 2016	Best Choreography	Pandit Birju Maharaj (for song "Mohe Rang Do Laal")	Won	
Filmfare Awards	16 January 2016	Best Choreography	Remo D'Souza (for song "Pinga")	Nominated	
Filmfare Awards	16 January 2016	Best Choreography	Ganesh Acharya (for song "Malhari")	Nominated	
Global Indian Music Academy Awards	6 April 2016	Best Film Album	Bajirao Mastani	Nominated	
Global Indian Music Academy Awards	6 April 2016	Best Film Song	"Pinga"	Nominated	
Global Indian Music Academy Awards	6 April 2016	Best Music Director	Sanjay Leela Bhansali	Won	
Global Indian Music Academy Awards	6 April 2016	Best Male Playback Singer	Arijit Singh (for song "Aayat")	Nominated	
Global Indian Music Academy Awards	6 April 2016	Best Female Playback Singer	Shreya Ghoshal (for song "Deewani Mastani")	Won	
Global Indian Music Academy Awards	6 April 2016	Best Female Playback Singer	Shreya Ghoshal (for song "Mohe Rang Do Laal")	Nominated	
Global Indian Music Academy Awards	6 April 2016	Best Duo/Group Song	Shreya Ghoshal, Vaishali Mhade (for song "Pinga")	Nominated	
Global Indian Music Academy Awards	6 April 2016	Best Background Score	Sanchit Balhara	Won	
Global Indian Music Academy Awards	6 April 2016	Best Engineer – Film Album	Tanay Gajjar	Won	
Global Indian Music Academy Awards	6 April 2016	Best Music Arranger and Programmer	Shail–Pritesh, Nitin Shankar (for song "Deewani Mastani")	Won	
Indian Film Festival of Melbourne	11–21 August 2016	Best Film	Bajirao Mastani	Nominated	
Indian Film Festival of Melbourne	11–21 August 2016	Best Director	Sanjay Leela Bhansali	Nominated	
Indian Film Festival of Melbourne	11–21 August 2016	Best Actor	Ranveer Singh	Nominated	
Indian Film Festival of Melbourne	11–21 August 2016	Best Actress	Deepika Padukone	Nominated	
International Indian Film Academy Awards	26 June 2016	Best Film	Bajirao Mastani	Nominated	
International Indian Film Academy Awards	26 June 2016	Best Director	Sanjay Leela Bhansali	Won	
International Indian Film Academy Awards	26 June 2016	Best Actor	Ranveer Singh	Won	
International Indian Film Academy Awards	26 June 2016	Best Actress	Deepika Padukone	Nominated	
International Indian Film Academy Awards	26 June 2016	Best Supporting Actress	Priyanka Chopra	Won	
International Indian Film Academy Awards	26 June 2016	Best Supporting Actress	Tanvi Azmi	Nominated	
International Indian Film Academy Awards	26 June 2016	Best Music Director	Sanjay Leela Bhansali	Nominated	
International Indian Film Academy Awards	26 June 2016	Best Female Playback Singer	Shreya Ghoshal (for song "Deewani Mastani")	Nominated	
International Indian Film Academy Awards	26 June 2016	Best Cinematography	Sudeep Chatterjee	Won	
International Indian Film Academy Awards	26 June 2016	Best Art Direction	Saloni Dhatrak, Sriram Iyengar, Sujeet Sawant	Won	
International Indian Film Academy Awards	26 June 2016	Best Costume Design	Anju Modi, Maxima Basu	Won	
International Indian Film Academy Awards	26 June 2016	Best Background Score	Sanchit Balhara	Won	
International Indian Film Academy Awards	26 June 2016	Best Choreography	Remo D'Souza (for song "Pinga")	Won	
International Indian Film Academy Awards	26 June 2016	Best Special Effects	Prasad Sutar	Won	
International Indian Film Academy Awards	26 June 2016	Best Sound Design	Nihar Ranjan Samal, Bishwadeep Chaterjee	Won	
International Indian Film Academy Awards	26 June 2016	Best Sound Recording	Tanay Gajjar	Won	
International Indian Film Academy Awards	26 June 2016	Best Action	Sham Kaushal	Won	
Mirchi Music Awards	29 February 2016	Album of the Year	Bajirao Mastani	Won	
Mirchi Music Awards	29 February 2016	Song of the Year	"Deewani Mastani"	Nominated	
Mirchi Music Awards	29 February 2016	Best Raag Inspired Song	"Albela Sajan"	Won	
Mirchi Music Awards	29 February 2016	Best Raag Inspired Song	"Aaj Ibaadat"	Nominated	
Mirchi Music Awards	29 February 2016	Best Raag Inspired Song	"Mohe Rang Do Laal"	Nominated	
Mirchi Music Awards	29 February 2016	Music Composer of the Year	Sanjay Leela Bhansali (for song "Deewani Mastani")	Nominated	
Mirchi Music Awards	29 February 2016	Music Composer of the Year	Sanjay Leela Bhansali (for song "Aayat")	Nominated	
Mirchi Music Awards	29 February 2016	Lyricist of the Year	Siddharth–Garima, Nasir Faraaz, Ganesh Chandanshive (for song "Deewani Mastani")	Nominated	
Mirchi Music Awards	29 February 2016	Male Vocalist of the Year	Arijit Singh (for song "Aayat")	Nominated	
Mirchi Music Awards	29 February 2016	Female Vocalist of the Year	Shreya Ghoshal, Vaishali Mhade (for song "Pinga")	Nominated	
Mirchi Music Awards	29 February 2016	Female Vocalist of the Year	Shreya Ghoshal (for song "Mohe Rang Do Laal")	Won	
Mirchi Music Awards	29 February 2016	Female Vocalist of the Year	Shreya Ghoshal (for song "Deewani Mastani")	Nominated	
Mirchi Music Awards	29 February 2016	Upcoming Female Vocalist of the Year	Vaishali Mhade (for song "Pinga")	Nominated	
Mirchi Music Awards	29 February 2016	Upcoming Female Vocalist of the Year	Payal Dev (for song "Ab Tohe Jane Na Doongi")	Won	
Mirchi Music Awards	29 February 2016	Upcoming Music Composer of the Year	Shreyas Puranik (for song "Gajanana")	Nominated	
Mirchi Music Awards	29 February 2016	Best Background Score	Sanchit Balhara	Won	
Mirchi Music Awards	29 February 2016	Best Song Producer (Programming and Arranging)	Shail–Pritesh (for song "Deewani Mastani")	Won	
Mirchi Music Awards	29 February 2016	Best Song Engineer (Recording and Mixing)	Tanay Gajjar (for song "Deewani Mastani")	Won	
Mirchi Music Awards	29 February 2016	Best Song Engineer (Recording and Mixing)	Tanay Gajjar (for song "Aayat")	Nominated	
National Film Awards	3 May 2016	Best Direction	Sanjay Leela Bhansali	Won	
National Film Awards	3 May 2016	Best Supporting Actress	Tanvi Azmi	Won	
National Film Awards	3 May 2016	Best Cinematography	Sudeep Chatterjee	Won	
National Film Awards	3 May 2016	Best Audiography • Sound Designer	Biswadeep Chatterjee	Won	
National Film Awards	3 May 2016	Best Audiography • Re-recordist of the Final Mixed Track	Justin Jose	Won	
National Film Awards	3 May 2016	Best Art Direction	Shriram Iyengar, Saloni Dhatrak and Sujeet Sawant	Won	
National Film Awards	3 May 2016	Best Choreography	Remo D'Souza (for song "Deewani Mastani")	Won	
Producers Guild Film Awards	22 December 2015	Best Film	Bajirao Mastani	Nominated	
Producers Guild Film Awards	22 December 2015	Best Director	Sanjay Leela Bhansali	Won	
Producers Guild Film Awards	22 December 2015	Best Actor in a Leading Role	Ranveer Singh	Won	
Producers Guild Film Awards	22 December 2015	Best Actress in a Leading Role	Priyanka Chopra	Nominated	
Producers Guild Film Awards	22 December 2015	Best Actress in a Leading Role	Deepika Padukone	Nominated	
Producers Guild Film Awards	22 December 2015	Best Actress in a Supporting Role	Tanvi Azmi	Won	
Producers Guild Film Awards	22 December 2015	Best Performance in a Negative Role	Tanvi Azmi	Nominated	
Producers Guild Film Awards	22 December 2015	Best Dialogue	Prakash R. Kapadia	Won	
Producers Guild Film Awards	22 December 2015	Best Cinematography	Sudeep Chatterjee	Won	
Producers Guild Film Awards	22 December 2015	Best Art Direction	Saloni Dhatrak, Sriram Iyengar, Sujeet Sawant	Won	
Producers Guild Film Awards	22 December 2015	Best Sound Design	Nihar Ranjan Samal	Won	
Producers Guild Film Awards	22 December 2015	Best Costume Design	Anju Modi, Maxima Basu	Won	
Producers Guild Film Awards	22 December 2015	Best Choreography	Remo D'Souza (for song "Pinga")	Won	
Screen Awards	8 January 2016	Best Film	Bajirao Mastani	Nominated	
Screen Awards	8 January 2016	Best Director	Sanjay Leela Bhansali	Nominated	
Screen Awards	8 January 2016	Best Actor	Ranveer Singh	Won (Note: Tied with Amitabh Bachchan for Piku.)	
Screen Awards	8 January 2016	Best Supporting Actress	Priyanka Chopra	Won	
Screen Awards	8 January 2016	Best Actor (Popular Choice)	Ranveer Singh	Nominated (Note: Also for Dil Dhadakne Do.)	
Screen Awards	8 January 2016	Best Actress (Popular Choice)	Priyanka Chopra	Nominated (Note: Also for Dil Dhadakne Do.)	
Screen Awards	8 January 2016	Best Actress (Popular Choice)	Deepika Padukone	Won	
Screen Awards	8 January 2016	Best Actor in a Negative Role – Female	Tanvi Azmi	Nominated	
Screen Awards	8 January 2016	Best Music Director	Sanjay Leela Bhansali	Nominated	
Screen Awards	8 January 2016	Best Cinematography	Sudeep Chatterjee	Won	
Screen Awards	8 January 2016	Best Production Design	Saloni Dhatrak, Sriram Iyengar, Sujeet Sawant	Won	
Screen Awards	8 January 2016	Best Costume Design	Anju Modi, Maxima Basu	Won	
Screen Awards	8 January 2016	Best Special Effects	Prasad Sutar	Won	
Times of India Film Awards	18 March 2016	Best Film	Bajirao Mastani	Nominated	
Times of India Film Awards	18 March 2016	Best Director	Sanjay Leela Bhansali	Won	
Times of India Film Awards	18 March 2016	Best Actor	Ranveer Singh	Won	
Times of India Film Awards	18 March 2016	Best Actress	Deepika Padukone	Nominated	
Times of India Film Awards	18 March 2016	Best Supporting Actress	Priyanka Chopra	Won	
Times of India Film Awards	18 March 2016	Best Supporting Actress	Tanvi Azmi	Nominated	
Times of India Film Awards	18 March 2016	Best Jodi	Ranveer Singh, Deepika Padukone	Won	
Times of India Film Awards	18 March 2016	Best Music Composer	Sanjay Leela Bhansali (for song "Deewani Mastani")	Won	
Times of India Film Awards	18 March 2016	Best Music Composer	Sanjay Leela Bhansali (for song "Aayat")	Nominated	
Times of India Film Awards	18 March 2016	Best Playback Singer Male	Arijit Singh (for song "Aayat")	Nominated	
Times of India Film Awards	18 March 2016	Best Playback Singer Female	Shreya Ghoshal (for song "Pinga")	Nominated	
Times of India Film Awards	18 March 2016	Best Playback Singer Female	Shreya Ghoshal (for song "Mohe Rang Do Laal")	Won	
Times of India Film Awards	18 March 2016	Best Playback Singer Female	Shreya Ghoshal (for song "Deewani Mastani")	Nominated	
Times of India Film Awards	18 March 2016	Best Album	Bajirao Mastani	Nominated	
Times of India Film Awards	18 March 2016	Song of the Year	"Deewani Mastani"	Nominated	
Times of India Film Awards	18 March 2016	Best Cinematography	Sudeep Chatterjee	Won	
Times of India Film Awards	18 March 2016	Best Art Direction	Saloni Dhatrak, Sriram Iyengar, Sujeet Sawant	Won	
Times of India Film Awards	18 March 2016	Best Costume Design	Anju Modi, Maxima Basu	Won	
Zee Cine Awards	20 February 2016	Best Film	Bajirao Mastani	Nominated	
Zee Cine Awards	20 February 2016	Best Director	Sanjay Leela Bhansali	Nominated	
Zee Cine Awards	20 February 2016	Best Actor – Male	Ranveer Singh	Nominated	
Zee Cine Awards	20 February 2016	Best Actor – Female	Priyanka Chopra	Nominated	
Zee Cine Awards	20 February 2016	Best Actor – Female	Deepika Padukone	Won	
Zee Cine Awards	20 February 2016	Critics Award for Best Film	Bajirao Mastani	Won	
Zee Cine Awards	20 February 2016	Critics Award for Best Director	Sanjay Leela Bhansali	Won	
Zee Cine Awards	20 February 2016	Critics Award for Best Actor – Male	Ranveer Singh	Won (Note: Tied with Amitabh Bachchan for Piku.)	
Zee Cine Awards	20 February 2016	Critics Award for Best Actor – Female	Priyanka Chopra	Nominated	
Zee Cine Awards	20 February 2016	Critics Award for Best Actor – Female	Deepika Padukone	Nominated	
Zee Cine Awards	20 February 2016	Best Actor in a Supporting Role – Female	Tanvi Azmi	Nominated	
Zee Cine Awards	20 February 2016	Best Male Debut	Vaibbhav Tatwawdi	Nominated	
Zee Cine Awards	20 February 2016	Best Music Director	Sanjay Leela Bhansali	Nominated	
Zee Cine Awards	20 February 2016	Best Lyricist	A. M. Turaz (for song "Aayat")	Nominated	
Zee Cine Awards	20 February 2016	Best Lyricist	Siddharth–Garima (for song "Mohe Rang Do Laal")	Nominated	
Zee Cine Awards	20 February 2016	Best Playback Singer – Male	Vishal Dadlani (for song "Malhaari")	Nominated	
Zee Cine Awards	20 February 2016	Best Playback Singer – Female	Shreya Ghoshal, Vaishali Mhade (for song "Pinga")	Nominated	
Zee Cine Awards	20 February 2016	Best Playback Singer – Female	Shreya Ghoshal (for song "Mohe Rang Do Laal")	Won	
Zee Cine Awards	20 February 2016	Best Playback Singer – Female	Shreya Ghoshal (for song "Deewani Mastani")	Nominated	
Zee Cine Awards	20 February 2016	Best Choreography	Remo D'Souza (for song "Pinga")	Nominated	
Zee Cine Awards	20 February 2016	Best Choreography	Remo D'Souza (for song "Deewani Mastani")	Nominated	
Zee Cine Awards	20 February 2016	Best Choreography	Ganesh Acharya (for song "Malhari")	Won	
Zee Cine Awards	20 February 2016	Best Choreography	Pandit Birju Maharaj (for song "Mohe Rang Do Laal")	Nominated	
Zee Cine Awards	20 February 2016	Best Cinematography	Sudeep Chatterjee	Won	
Zee Cine Awards	20 February 2016	Best Background Score	Sanchit Balhara	Won	
Zee Cine Awards	20 February 2016	Best Special Effects	Prasad Sutar	Won	
Zee Cine Awards	20 February 2016	Best Art Direction	Saloni Dhatrak, Sriram Iyengar, Sujeet Sawant	Won	
Zee Cine Awards	20 February 2016	Best Sound Design	Nihar Ranjan Samal	Won	
Zee Cine Awards	20 February 2016	Best Action	Sham Kaushal	Won	
South African International Film Festival	2017	Best Actress	Deepika Padukone	Won	

== See also ==
- List of Bollywood films of 2015
