= 17th IIFA Awards =

Indian film award ceremony in 2016

- Date: 23 June 2016– 26 June 2016
- Site: IFEMA; Madrid, Spain
- Hosted by: Shahid Kapoor; Farhan Akhtar

Highlights
- Best Picture: Bajrangi Bhaijaan
- Most awards: Bajirao Mastani (13)
- Most nominations: Bajirao Mastani (18)

Television coverage
- Network: Colors TV

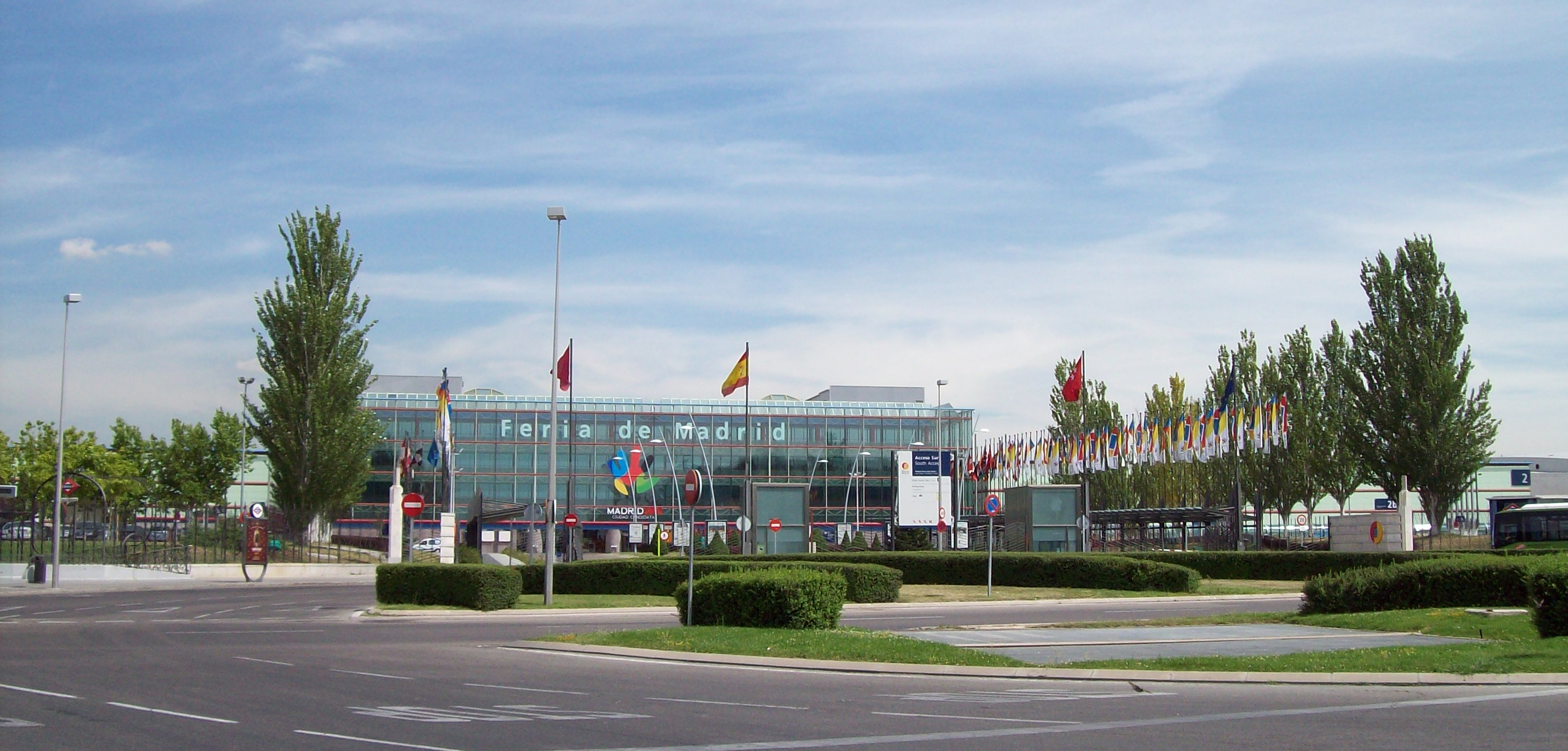
The event was held at IFEMA in Madrid, Spain.

The 2016 IIFA Awards, officially known as the 17th International Indian Film Academy Awards ceremony, presented by the International Indian Film Academy honouring the best Hindi films of 2015, took place on 25 June 2016. The official ceremony took place on 25 June 2016 in IFEMA, Madrid, Spain. The nominations were announced on 26 May 2016.

Bajirao Mastani led the ceremony with 8 nominations, followed by Bajrangi Bhaijaan with 7 nominations and Piku with 6 nominations.

Bajirao Mastani won 13 awards, including Best Director (for Sanjay Leela Bhansali), Best Actor (for Ranveer Singh), and Best Supporting Actress (for Priyanka Chopra), thus becoming the most-awarded film at the ceremony.

Deepika Padukone received dual nominations for Best Actress for her performances in Bajirao Mastani and Piku, winning for the latter.

== Winners and nominees ==
=== Popular awards ===
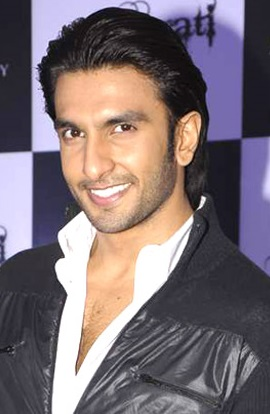
Ranveer Singh (Best Actor)

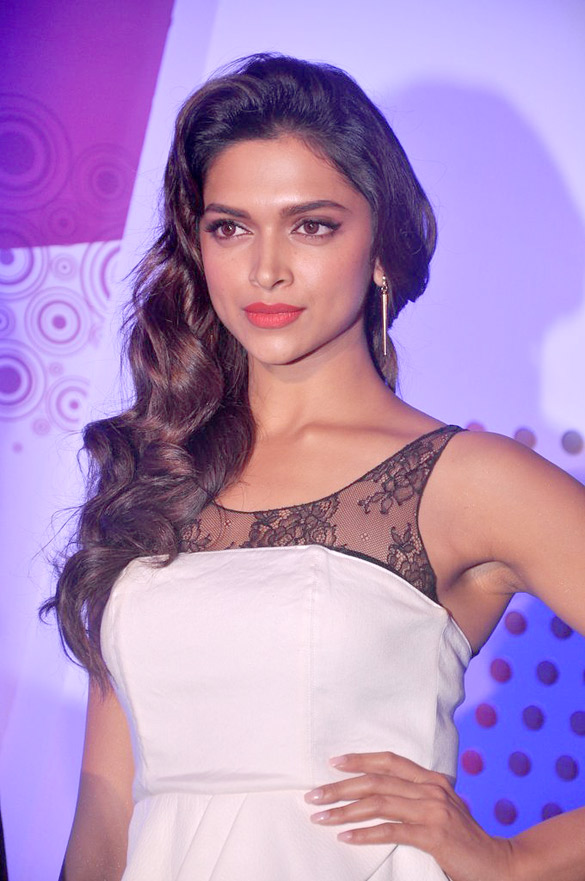
Deepika Padukone (Best Actress)

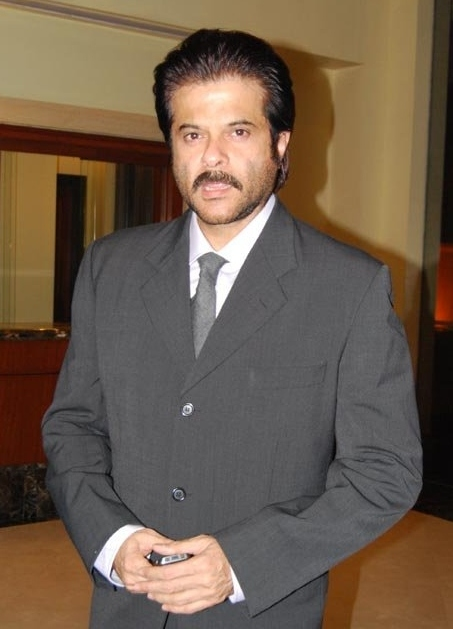
Anil Kapoor (Best Supporting Actor)

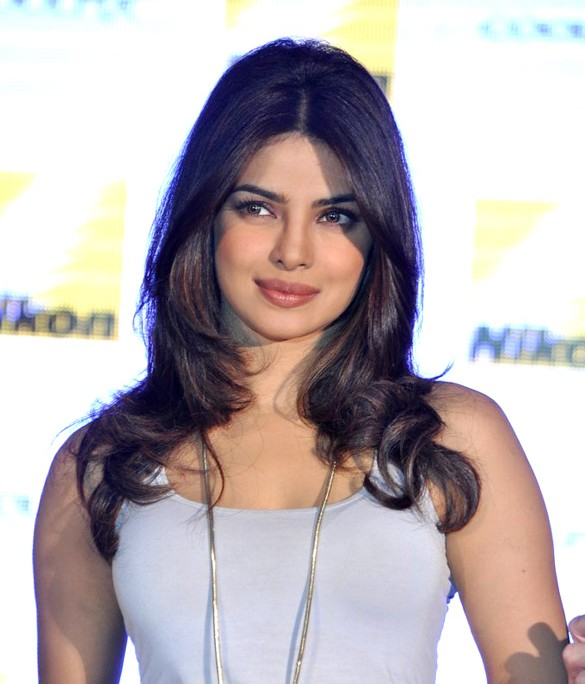
Priyanka Chopra (Best Supporting Actress)

Best Film	Best Director
Bajrangi Bhaijaan – Salman Khan Films, Kabir Khan Films; Bajirao Mastani – Bhansali Productions; Piku – MSM Motion Pictures, Saraswati Entertainment; Talvar – VB Pictures; Tanu Weds Manu Returns – Colour Yellow	Sanjay Leela Bhansali – Bajirao Mastani; Aanand L. Rai – Tanu Weds Manu Returns; Kabir Khan – Bajrangi Bhaijaan; Meghna Gulzar – Talvar; Shoojit Sircar – Piku
Best Actor In A Leading Role	Best Actress In A Leading Role
Ranveer Singh - Bajirao Mastani as Bajirao I; Amitabh Bachchan – Piku as Bhashkor Banerjee; Ranbir Kapoor – Tamasha as Ved Vardhan Sahni; Salman Khan – Bajrangi Bhaijaan as Pawan Kumar Chaturvedi; Varun Dhawan – Badlapur as Raghav "Raghu" Pratap Singh	Deepika Padukone – Piku as Piku Banerjee; Deepika Padukone – Bajirao Mastani as Mastani; Kangana Ranaut – Tanu Weds Manu Returns as Tanuja 'Tanu' Trivedi / Kumari 'Kusum' Sangwan (Datto); Priyanka Chopra – Dil Dhadakne Do as Ayesha Sangha née Mehra; Shraddha Kapoor – ABCD 2 as Vini
Best Actor In A Supporting Role	Best Actress In A Supporting Role
Anil Kapoor – Dil Dhadakne Do as Kamal Mehra; Deepak Dobriyal – Tanu Weds Manu Returns as Pappi; Farhan Akhtar – Dil Dhadakne Do as Sunny Gill; Irrfan Khan – Piku as Rana Chaudhary; Nawazuddin Siddiqui – Bajrangi Bhaijaan as Chand Nawab	Priyanka Chopra – Bajirao Mastani as Kashibai; Anushka Sharma – Dil Dhadakne Do as Farah Ali; Huma Qureshi – Badlapur as Jhimli; Konkona Sen Sharma – Talvar as Nutan Tandon; Tanvi Azmi – Bajirao Mastani as Radhabai
Best Male Debut	Best Female Debut
Vicky Kaushal – Masaan as Deepak Chaudhary	Bhumi Pednekar – Dum Laga Ke Haisha as Sandhya Verma
Best Performance In A Comic Role	Best Performance In A Negative Role
Deepak Dobriyal – Tanu Weds Manu Returns as Pappi; Kapil Sharma – Kis Kisko Pyaar Karoon as Kumar Shiv Ram Kishan; Nawazuddin Siddiqui – Bajrangi Bhaijaan as Chand Nawab	Darshan Kumar – NH10 as Satbir; Gajraj Rao – Talvar as Inspector Dhaniram; Nawazuddin Siddiqui – Badlapur as Liak Mohammed Tungrekar; Vinay Pathak – Badlapur as Harman Khatri
Best Story	Best Debut Couple
Juhi Chaturvedi – Piku; Massimo Carlotto – Badlapur; V. Vijayendra Prasad – Bajrangi Bhaijaan	Sooraj Pancholi & Athiya Shetty – Hero

=== Special awards ===
IIFA Award for Woman of the Year
- Priyanka Chopra

Prasad

=== Musical awards ===
Best Music Direction	Best Lyrics
Roy – Amaal Mallik, Meet Bros Anjjan, Ankit Tiwari; Bajirao Mastani – Sanjay Leela Bhansali; Bajrangi Bhaijaan – Pritam Chakraborty	Moh Moh Ke Dhaage from Dum Laga Ke Haisha – Varun Grover; "Agar Tum Saath Ho" from Tamasha – Irshad Kamil; "Gerua" from Dilwale – Amitabh Bhattacharya
Best Male Playback Singer	Best Female Playback Singer
Papon for "Moh Moh Ke Dhaage" – Dum Laga Ke Haisha; Arijit Singh for "Hamari Adhuri Kahani" – Hamari Adhuri Kahani; Arijit Singh for "Sooraj Dooba Hain" – Roy	Monali Thakur for "Moh Moh Ke Dhaage" – Dum Laga Ke Haisha; Kanika Kapoor for "Chittiyaan Kalaiyaan" – Roy; Shreya Ghoshal for "Deewani Mastani" – Bajirao Mastani; Sunidhi Chauhan for "Girls Like To Swing" – Dil Dhadakne Do
Best Sound Design	Best Background Score
Bishwadeep Chaterjee & Nihar Ranjal Samal – Bajirao Mastani	Sanchit Balhara – Bajirao Mastani

=== Technical awards ===
Best Action	Best Special Effects
Sham Kaushal – Bajirao Mastani	Prasad Sutar – Bajirao Mastani
Best Choreography	Best Cinematography
Remo D'Souza – Bajirao Mastani	Sudeep Chatterjee – Bajirao Mastani
Best Costume Design	Best Dialogue
Anju Modi & Maxima Basu – Bajirao Mastani	Juhi Chaturvedi – Piku
Best Editing	Best Makeup
A. Sreekar Prasad – Talvar	Vikram Gaikwad – Tanu Weds Manu Returns
Best Production Design	Best Screenplay
Saloni Dhatrak, Sriram Iyengar & Sujeet Sawant – Bajirao Mastani	Kabir Khan & Parveez Shaikh – Bajrangi Bhaijaan
Best Sound Mixing	Best Sound Recording
Ajay Kumar P. B. – Bajirao Mastani	Tanay Gajjar for Deewani Mastani – Bajirao Mastani

== Superlatives ==
Films with multiple nominations
Nominations	Film
8	Bajirao Mastani
7	Bajrangi Bhaijaan
6	Piku
5	Badlapur
5	Dil Dhadakne Do
5	Tanu Weds Manu Returns
4	Talvar
3	Dum Laga Ke Haisha
3	Roy
2	Tamasha

Films with multiple awards
Awards	Film
13	Bajirao Mastani
4	Dum Laga Ke Haisha
3	Piku
2	Bajrangi Bhaijaan
2	Tanu Weds Manu Returns

== See also ==
- International Indian Film Academy Awards
- Bollywood
- Cinema of India
