= List of awards and nominations received by Sanjay Leela Bhansali =

Sanjay Leela Bhansali awards and nominations
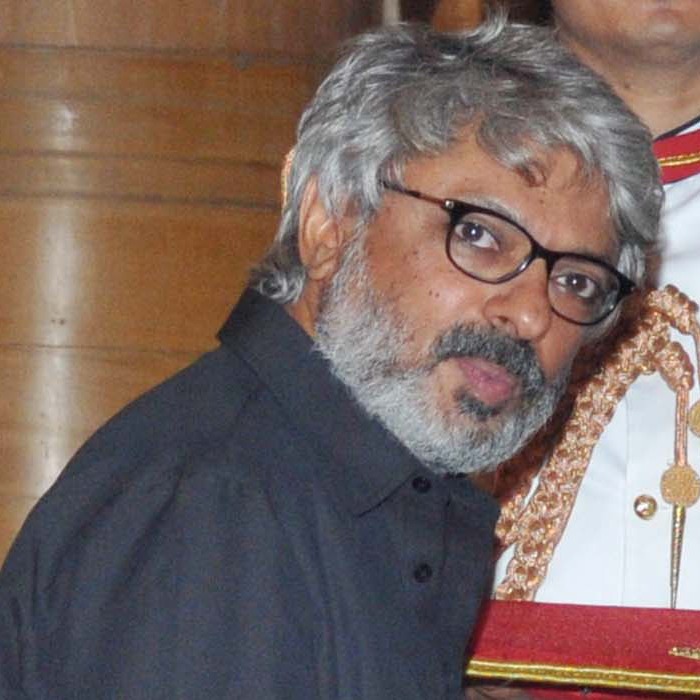
- Bhansali in 2015
Awards and nominations
Award	Wins	Nominations
National Film Awards	7	–
Filmfare Awards	13	22
Mirchi Music Awards	6	14
Screen Awards	5	8
IIFA Awards	8	17
Zee Cine Awards	6	1
BAFTA Awards	0	1
Others	3	3
Honours	1	–

Totals (Note: Certain award groups do not simply award one winner. They acknowledge several different recipients, have runners-up, and have third place. Since this is a specific recognition and is different from losing an award, runner-up mentions are considered wins in this award tally. For simplification and to avoid errors, each award in this list has been presumed to have had a prior nomination.)
- Wins: 48
- Nominations: 68

Indian filmmaker Sanjay Leela Bhansali is the recipient of several awards, including seven National Film Awards, thirteen Filmfare Awards and a BAFTA nomination. In 2015, the Government of India honoured him with the Padma Shri, the fourth highest civilian award.

Bhansali made his directorial debut with Khamoshi: The Musical (1996), for which he received the Filmfare Critics Award for Best Film. He rose to prominence in Indian cinema with the hit romance Hum Dil De Chuke Sanam (1999), the commercially successful and widely acclaimed romantic drama Devdas (2002) — which received a nomination for the Best Film Not in the English Language at British Academy of Film & Television Arts (BAFTA) Awards — and the drama Black (2005), for all of which he received multiple Best Film awards and Best Director awards along with an additional Filmfare Award for Best Film (Critics) award for the latter, and multiple National Film Awards for the latter two. However, he followed it by directing consecutive commercially failures such as Saawariya (2007) and Guzaarish (2010), however, Guzaarish received positive reviews from critics and audiences.

This changed with his adaptation of Shakespeare's Romeo and Juliet — the tragic romance Goliyon Ki Raasleela Ram-Leela (2013) — opened to positive reviews and strong box office collections, for which he received several awards and nominations. His home production biographical sports film Mary Kom (2014), had him receive his third National Film Award. His ensemble period dramas Bajirao Mastani (2015) and Padmaavat (2018) rank among the highest-grossing Indian films of all time. For the former, he won the National Film Award for Best Direction, as well as Best Film and Best Director Awards at Filmfare. He further earned more commercial and critical success for his biographical film, Gangubai Kathiawadi (2022) for which he received several accolades including the National Film Awards for Best Adapted Screenplay and Best Editing and Filmfare Awards for Best Direction and Best Film.

== British Academy Film Awards ==
Year	Category	Film	Result	Ref.
2002	Best Film Not in the English Language	Devdas	Nominated	

== National Film Awards ==
Year	Category	Film	Result	Ref.
2002	Best Popular Film Providing Wholesome Entertainment	Devdas	Won	
2005	Best Feature Film in Hindi	Black	Won	
2014	Best Popular Film Providing Wholesome Entertainment	Mary Kom	Won	
2015	Best Director	Bajirao Mastani	Won	
2018	Best Music Director	Padmaavat	Won	
2021	Best Screenplay	Gangubai Kathiawadi	Won	
2021	Best Editing	Gangubai Kathiawadi	Won	

== Filmfare Awards ==
Year	Film	Result	Ref.
Best Film
2000	Hum Dil De Chuke Sanam	Won	
2003	Devdas	Won	
2006	Black	Won	
2014	Goliyon Ki Raasleela Ram-Leela	Nominated	
2015	Mary Kom	Nominated	
2016	Bajirao Mastani	Won	
2019	Padmaavat	Nominated	
2023	Gangubai Kathiawadi	Won	
Best Film (Critics)
1997	Khamoshi: The Musical	Won	
2006	Black	Won	
Best Director
2000	Hum Dil De Chuke Sanam	Won	
2003	Devdas	Won	
2006	Black	Won	
2011	Guzaarish	Nominated	
2014	Goliyon Ki Raasleela Ram-Leela	Nominated	
2016	Bajirao Mastani	Won	
2019	Padmaavat	Nominated	
2023	Gangubai Kathiawadi	Won	
Best Screenplay
2023	Gangubai Kathiawadi	Nominated	
Best Music Director
2014	Goliyon Ki Raasleela Ram-Leela	Nominated	
2016	Bajirao Mastani	Nominated	
2019	Padmaavat	Won	
2023	Gangubai Kathiawadi	Nominated	
Best Scene
2003	Devdas	Won	

== Mirchi Music Awards ==
Year	Category	Film	Song	Result	Ref
2010	Upcoming Music Composer of The Year	Guzaarish	"Udi"	Nominated	
2015	Album of The Year	Bajirao Mastani	-	Won	
2015	Music Composer of The Year	Bajirao Mastani	"Aayat"	Nominated	
2015	Music Composer of The Year	Bajirao Mastani	"Deewani Mastani"	Nominated	
2015	Royal Stag Make It Large Award	-	-	Won	
2019	Album of the Year	Padmaavat	-	Won	
2019	Song of the Year	Padmaavat	"Ghoomar"	Won	
2019	Song of the Year	Padmaavat	"Khalibali"	Nominated	
2019	Raag-Inspired Song of the Year	Padmaavat	"Ek Dil Ek Jaan"	Won	
2019	Raag-Inspired Song of the Year	Padmaavat	"Ghoomar"	Nominated	
2019	Listeners' Choice Album of the Year	Padmaavat	-	Nominated	
2019	Music Composer of The Year	Padmaavat	"Ek Dil Ek Jaan"	Won	
2019	Music Composer of The Year	Padmaavat	"Khalibali"	Nominated	
2019	Music Composer of The Year	Padmaavat	"Binte Dil"	Nominated	

== Screen Awards ==
- 2003: Best Film – Devdas
- 2003: Best Director – Devdas

== International Indian Film Academy (IIFA) Awards ==
- 2000: Best Film – Hum Dil De Chuke Sanam
- 2000: Best Director – Hum Dil De Chuke Sanam
- 2000: Best Story – Hum Dil De Chuke Sanam (Shared with Pratap Karvat)
- 2000: Best Screenplay – Hum Dil De Chuke Sanam (Shared with Kenneth Phillips)
- 2003: Best Director – Devdas
- 2006: Best Film – Black
- 2006: Best Director – Black
- 2014: Best Film – Goliyon Ki Rasleela Ramleela (Nominated)
- 2014: Best Director – Goliyon Ki Rasleela Ramleela (Nominated)
- 2015: Best Film – Bajirao Mastani (Nominated)
- 2016: Best Director – Bajirao Mastani

== Zee Cine Awards ==
- 2000: Best Film – Hum Dil De Chuke Sanam
- 2000: Best Director – Hum Dil De Chuke Sanam
- 2000: Best Story – Hum Dil De Chuke Sanam (shared with Prakash Karwat)
- 2005: Best Film – Black
- 2005: Best Director – Black
- 2005: Best Film – Bajirao Mastani (Nominated)
- 2015: Best Director – Bajirao Mastani

== Others ==
- 2000: Zee Gold Award for Best Director – Hum Dil De Chuke Sanam
- 2000: Zee Gold Award for Best Screenplay – Hum Dil De Chuke Sanam
- 2005: Stardust Special Award for the best Film – Black

== Honours ==
- 2015: He was awarded Padma Shri, the fourth highest civilian award of India.

== See also ==
- List of accolades received by Mary Kom
- List of accolades received by Bajirao Mastani
- List of accolades received by Padmaavat
