= Shahenshah (novel) =

1970 novel by Nagnath S. Inamdar

- Front cover of the novel
- Author: Nagnath S. Inamdar
- Translator: Vikrant Pande
- Genre: Biographical fiction
- Publisher: Continental Prakashan
- Publication date: 1970
- Publication place: India
- Pages: 715
- ISBN: 9788174210616

Shahenshah (Marathi: शहेनशहा) is a 1970 Marathi historical fiction novel by N S Inamdar. The story is a fictional biography of the Mughal emperor Muhi-ud-Din Muhammad, otherwise popularly known as Aurangzeb, hence the title Shahanshah, which is a title given to emperors. Under his reign the Mughal Empire achieved its largest expansion and also saw a rapid downfall, disintegrating shortly after his death. The novel focuses on his 50-year reign and is about an Emperor who is feared by all and is extremely intelligent yet faces a heartbroken and lonely death.

== English translation ==
Front Cover of English translation by Vikrant Pande

The book was translated to English as "Shahenshah – The Life of Aurangzeb" by Vikrant Pande and published by Harper Perennial in 2016.
