= Kashibai =

Peshwinbai (1703-1758)

Kashibai Bajirao Ballal
- Shrimant Peshwin
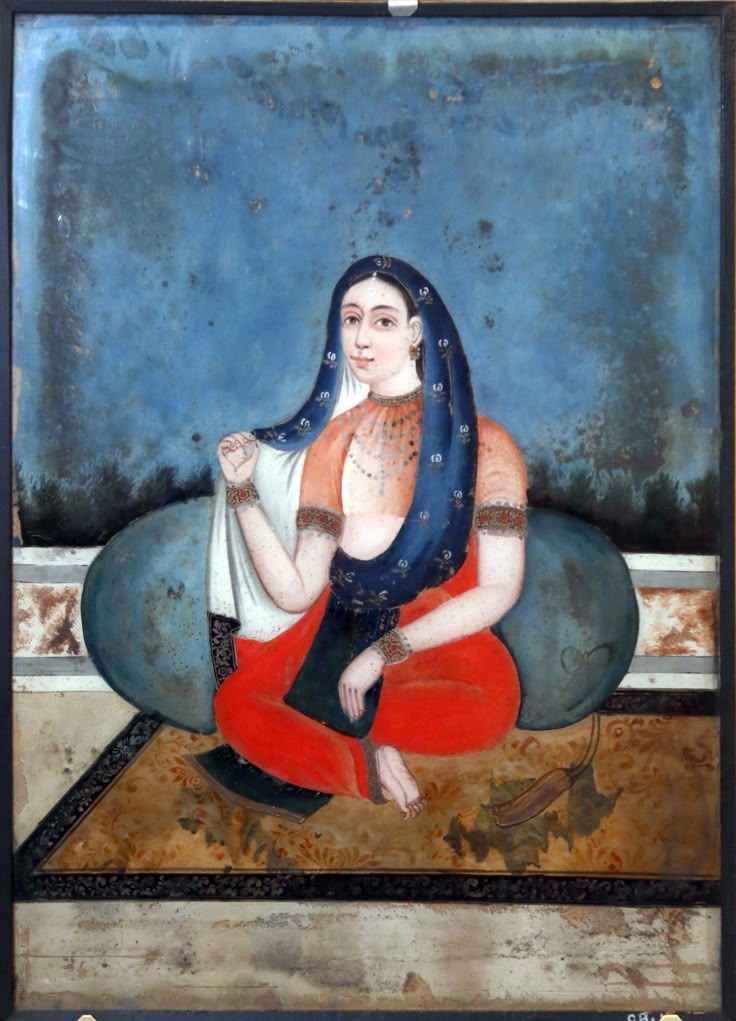
- 19th Century Glass Painting of Kashibai, Baroda Museum & Picture Gallery

Peshwin of the Maratha Empire
- Tenure: 17 April 1720 – 28 April 1740
- Predecessor: Radhabai Barve
- Successor: Gopikabai

Peshwin Dowager of the Maratha Empire
- Tenure: 28 April 1740 – 27 November 1758
- Predecessor: Radhabai Barve (mother of Bajirao I)
- Successor: Gopikabai
- Born: Kashibai Joshi; 19 October 1703; Chaas Village, Pune, Maratha Empire
- Died: 27 November 1758 (aged 55); Satara , Maratha Empire,
- Spouse: Bajirao I (m. 1720; died 1740)
- Issue: Balaji Baji Rao; Ramchandra Rao; Raghunath Rao; Janardhan Rao
- House: Joshi (by birth); Bhat (by marriage)
- Father: Mahadji Joshi
- Mother: Shiubai
- Religion: Hinduism

Kashibai Bhat was the wife of Bajirao I, the Peshwa (Prime Minister) to the fourth Maratha Chhatrapati (Emperor) Shahu. With Bajirao, she had four children, including Balaji Baji Rao and Ragunath Rao. Balaji succeeded Bajirao as Peshwa upon the latter's death in 1740. Also following Bajirao's death, Kashibai fostered her step-son, Shamsher Bahadur, whose mother was Bajirao's second wife, Mastani.

== Family ==
Kashibai was the daughter of Mahadji Krishna Joshi and Bhabanibai of Chas, belonging to a wealthy banker family. She was born in Chaaskaman village. Kashibai also had a brother named Krishnarao Chaskar.

According to historian Pandurang Balkawade, Kashibai was quiet and soft-spoken and had arthritis.

== Marriage ==
Kashibai was married to Bajirao I on March 11, 1720, in a household ceremony at Saswad. The marriage was a happy one. Kashibai and Bajirao had four sons together. Balaji Baji Rao (nicknamed "Nanasaheb"), was born in 1720 and was later appointed Peshwa by Shahu in 1740 after Bajirao's death. Their second son Ramchandra died young. Their third son Raghunath Rao (nicknamed "Raghoba") served as the Peshwa during 1773–1774 while their fourth son Janardhan Rao also died young.

Bajirao took a second wife, Mastani]. However, this marriage was not accepted by the Bhat family. Kashibai is also noted to have not played any role in the household war waged by the Peshwa family against Mastani. Historian Pandurang Balkawade notes that various historical documents suggest that she was ready to accept Mastani as Bajirao's second wife, but could not do so going against her mother-in-law Radhabai and brother-in-law Chimaji Appa

As the Brahmins of Pune boycotted the Peshwa family due to Bajirao's relations with Mastani, Chimaji Appa and Nanasaheb resolved to force the separation of Bajirao and Mastani in early 1740.

== Bajirao's death ==
While Bajirao was out of Pune on expedition, Mastani was put under house arrest. Nanasaheb had sent his mother Kashibai to meet Bajirao. Kashibai is said to have served him on his deathbed as a loyal and dutiful wife and has been described as highly devoted to her husband. She and her son Janardhan performed the last rites.

Mastani died in 1740 soon after Bajirao's death and then Kashibai took care of their son Shamsher Bahadur and made facilities to train him in weaponry. She became more religious after her husband's death. She performed various pilgrimages and stayed in Banaras for four years. On one such tour she was accompanied with 10,000 pilgrims and had expenditure of rupees one lakh. Returning from a pilgrimage in July 1747, she commissioned a temple dedicated to Shiva in her hometown Chas naming it Someshwar Temple. Built in 1749, the temple stands on a 1.5 acres (0.61 ha) land and is popular for Tripurari Poornima celebrations and finds mention in the Marathi book Sahali Ek Divasyachya Parisaraat Punyachya as a tourist spot near Pune.

== In popular culture ==
- Shrimant Peshwin Kashibai is a historical marathi novel based on Kashibai's life written by author Ashwini Kulkarni.
- Kashibai features in Raau, the 1972 fictional historical novel by Nagnath S. Inamdar.
- Kashibai is a principal character in Ram Sivasankaran's novel The Peshwa: The Lion and the Stallion (2015).
- A fictional version of Kashibai (based on Nagnath S. Inamdar's novel Raau) was portrayed by Priyanka Chopra in the 2015 film Bajirao Mastani directed by Sanjay Leela Bhansali.
- Ishita Ganguly was selected to portray Kashibai in a 2017 series titled Peshwa Bajirao.
- Aarohi Patel played the younger Kashi, while Riya Sharma portrays the adult version in Zee TV's 2021 historical drama show Kashibai Bajirao Ballal.
