= IIFA Award for Best Action =

Annual film award in India

The IIFA Best Action is a technical award chosen ahead of the ceremonies.

== Multiple wins ==
Wins	Recipient
4	Sham Kaushal
2	Parvez Shaikh

== Awards ==
The winners are listed below:-

Year	Winner	Film
2017	Larnell Stovall, Parvez Shaikh, 'ANL ' Arasu	Sultan
2016	Sham Kaushal	Bajirao Mastani
2015	Parvez Shaikh & Andy Armstrong	Bang Bang
2014	Sham Kaushal & Tony Ching Siu Tung	Krrish 3
2013	Sham Kaushal	Gangs of Wasseypur – Part 1
2012	Jai Singh Nijjar	Singham
2011	Vijayen Master	Dabangg
2010	Sham Kaushal	Kaminey
2009	Peter Hein, Stun Siva	Ghajini
2008	Javed Sheikh, Ejaz Sheikh	Shootout at Lokhandwala

== See also ==
- IIFA Awards
- Bollywood
- Cinema of India
