= IIFA Award for Best Special Effects =

Annual film award in India

The IIFA Special Effects is a technical award chosen ahead of the ceremonies.

== Multiple wins ==
Wins	Recipient
6	Red Chillies VFX
4	Prime Focus Group

== Awards ==
The winners are listed below:

Year	Winner	Film
2025	Haresh Hingorani (Red Chillies VFX)	Bhool Bhulaiyaa 3
2024	Haresh Hingorani (Red Chillies VFX)	Jawan
2023	DNEG & Redefine	Brahmāstra: Part One – Shiva
2022	NY VFXWALA	Sardar Udham
2020	YFX (YRF Studios)	War
2019	Filmgate Films AB	Tumbbad
2018	NY VFXwala	Jagga Jasoos
2017	Haresh Hingorani (Red Chillies VFX)	Fan
2016	Prasad Sutar	Bajirao Mastani
2015	Prime Focus Group	Kick
2014	Haresh Hingorani (Red Chillies VFX)	Krrish 3
2013	Tata Elxsi	Ek Tha Tiger
2012	Haresh Hingorani (Red Chillies VFX)	Ra.One
2011	V. Srinivas Mohan (Indian Artists)	Robot
2010	Charles Darby - Eyecube Labs	Aladdin
2009	Prime Focus Group	Ghajini
2008	Haresh Hingorani (Red Chillies VFX)	Om Shanti Om
2007	EFX Studios	Krrish
2006	Prime Focus Group	Dus
2005	Rajtaru Video Sonic & Eagle Video Films	Main Hoon Na
2004	Bimmini Special Fx, Digital Art Media	Koi Mil Gaya
2003	Prime Focus Group	Kaante
2002	Paul Sims	Aks
2001	Raj Taru (Video Sonic Ltd)	Phir Bhi Dil Hai Hindustani
2000	CMM Studios & Raj Taru (Video Sonic)	Hindustan Ki Kasam

== See also ==
- IIFA Awards
- Bollywood
- Cinema of India
