= Nagnath S. Inamdar =

Indian writer (1923–2002)

Nagnath S. Inamdar (1923–2002) was an Indian novelist in the Marathi language whose career spanned almost five decades.

== Career ==
Inamdar was born in a village in Satara district of Maharashtra, India. He rose from humble beginnings to establish himself as one of India's best novelists. He was a prominent figure in Marathi literature.

== Works ==
Inamdar wrote sixteen historical novels, the most prominent of which are

- Shahenshah - 1970
- Raau - 1972
- Jhunja
- Rajeshri
- Shikasta
- Mantravegala
- Jhep

He also wrote his autobiography spanning three volumes. In 2015, his novel Rau was adapted into an Indian historical epic film titled Bajirao Mastani, directed by Sanjay Leela Bhansali.

== Death ==
Inamdar died on 16 October 2002 at his residence in Pune, aged 79. He is survived by his wife and a daughter.

== Awards and recognition ==
- 1997 - presided over Marathi Sahitya Sammelan in Ahmednagar
