= Sudeep Chatterjee =

Indian cinematographer

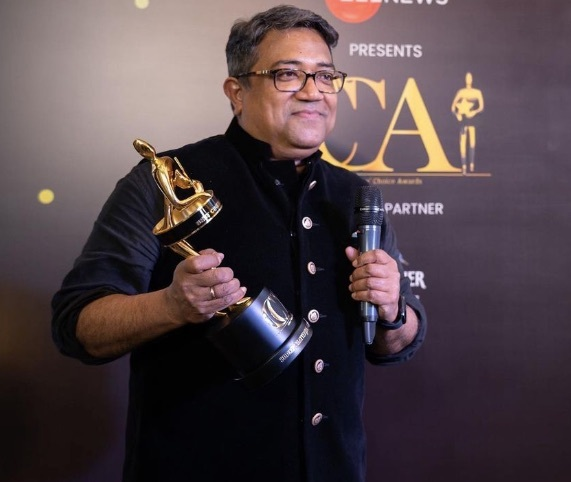
- Born: Kolkata, India
- Education: Film and Television Institute of India, Pune
- Occupation: Cinematographer
- Years active: 1995 – present
- Known for: Kaalpurush; Chotushkone; Bajirao Mastani; Padmaavat; Chak De India; Gangubai Kathiawadi
- Children: 2 (Ishika Chatterjee & Ishaan Chaterjee)
- Website: https://www.sudeepchatterjee.net

Sudeep Chatterjee is an Indian cinematographer, who mainly works in Hindi films and Bengali films. He has collaborated with critically acclaimed directors like Buddhadeb Dasgupta, Vishal Bharadwaj, Srijit Mukherji, Sanjay Leela Bhansali and Nagesh Kukunoor. He is mostly known for his work in films like Iqbal (2005), Chak De India (2007), Guzaarish (2010), Dhoom 3 (2013), Chotushkone (2014), Bajirao Mastani (2015), Padmaavat (2018), and Gangubai Kathiawadi (2022). He has received the National Film Award for Best Cinematography, twice, for Chotushkone and Bajirao Mastani.

== Early life and education ==
Chatterjee was born and raised in Kolkata. After he passed class 10 his father gave him a camera, which in time provided him with a career direction. After he finished his schooling he joined an engineering college, but after only eight months he left it to join the Film and Television Institute of India (FTII), Pune, where he studied cinematography.

== Career ==
After graduating from Film and Television Institute of India, he started his career in Kolkata making advertisements and documentaries, eventually after two years, filmmaker Anjan Dutt offered him Bada Din (1997), a Hindi film starring Shabana Azmi. Thereafter he shifted based to Mumbai and started working TV series and commercials for a year before he shot Ram Gopal Verma's Road (2002).

Soon was working in film across genres, action, thriller and drama, and his in Salman Khan starrer, Lucky: No Time for Love (2005), where he shot the picturesque locales of Russia, followed by Nagesh Kukunoor's successive films Iqbal (2005) and Dor (2006), and Jaan-E-Mann (2005) got him attention, and he got to do Chak De! India (2007) directed by Shimit Amin, where he grained and desaturated the film, and shot almost 80% of the movie with a hand-held camera, eventually winning him accolades and the 2008 Filmfare Award for Best Cinematography, IIFA Award for Best Cinematography and Zee Cine Award for Best Cinematography amongst others. His next important work was in Bengali film, Kaalpurush (2008), directed by acclaimed film director of Bengali cinema, Buddhadev Dasgupta, and starring Mithun Chakraborty and Rahul Bose, the film won the National Film Award for Best Feature Film.

In 2010 came Guzaarish directed by Sanjay Leela Bhansali starring Hrithik Roshan and Ashwariya Rai, Sudeep had previously apprenticed with Sanjay, also a fellow FTII student, in 1942: A Love Story, where he was the song director. Guzaarish Won IIFA, Screen, and Apsara award for best Cinematography.

He followed it up with the big budget super successful entertainer Dhoom 3 (2013). He then worked in the film Chotushkone (2014) directed by critically acclaimed director Srijit Mukherji for which Chatterjee won the prestigious National Film Award for Best Cinematography.

Chatterjee followed up with his second consecutive National award in 2015 with the highly acclaimed Bajirao Mastani directed by Sanjay Leela Bhansali.

He again collaborated with Sanjay Leela Bhansali for the critically and commercially successful period piece Padmavat (2018). He is currently shooting the period drama Gangubai Kathiawadi (2021) directed by Sanjay Leela Bhansali and much anticipated Brahmāstra (2022) directed by Ayan Mukherjee.

He is presently a member of the advisory board of the Kautik International Student Film Festival

== Filmography ==
=== Films ===
Denotes films that have not yet been released

Year	Film	Language	Director	Notes
1997	Bada Din	Hindi	Anjan Dutt	
2002	Road	Hindi	Rajat Mukherjee	
2004	Kyun! Ho Gaya Na...	Hindi	Samir Karnik	
2005	Lucky: No Time for Love	Hindi	Radhika Rao; Vinay Sapru	
2005	Iqbal	Hindi	Nagesh Kukunoor	
2005	Eashwar Mime Co.	Hindi	Shyamanand Jalan	
2006	Dor	Hindi	Nagesh Kukunoor	
2006	Jaan-E-Mann	Hindi	Shirish Kunder	
2006	Fight Club – Members Only	Hindi	Vikram Chopra	
2007	Chak De! India	Hindi	Shimit Amin	
2008	Kaalpurush	Bengali	Buddhadeb Dasgupta	
2008	Bombay To Bangkok	Hindi	Nagesh Kukunoor	
2008	Thoda Pyaar Thoda Magic	Hindi	Kunal Kohli	
2009	Dil Bole Hadippa	Hindi	Anurag Singh	
2009	Kaminey	Hindi	Vishal Bhardwaj	Additional photography
2009	Main Aurr Mrs Khanna	Hindi	Prem Raj	
2010	Aashayein	Hindi	Nagesh Kukunoor	
2010	Guzaarish	Hindi	Sanjay Leela Bhansali	
2011	Mere Brother Ki Dulhan	Hindi	Ali Abbas Zafar	
2012	Joker	Hindi	Shirish Kunder	
2013	Dhoom 3	Hindi	Vijay Krishna Acharya	
2014	Chotushkone	Bengali	Srijit Mukherji	
2015	Baby	Hindi	Neeraj Pandey	
2015	Bajirao Mastani	Hindi	Sanjay Leela Bhansali	
2017	Kaabil	Hindi	Sanjay Gupta	
2018	Padmaavat	Hindi	Sanjay Leela Bhansali	
2018	Missing	Hindi	Mukul Abhyankar	
2019	Thackeray	Hindi	Abhijit Panse	
2019	Housefull 4	Hindi	Farhad Samji	
2022	Gangubai Kathiawadi	Hindi	Sanjay Leela Bhansali	
2022	Brahmāstra: Part One – Shiva	Hindi	Ayan Mukerji	
2023	Shehzada	Hindi	Rohit Dhawan	
2024	Chandu Champion	Hindi	Kabir Khan	
2025	Bhool Chuk Maaf	Hindi	Karan Sharma	
2027	Fauzi †	Telugu	Hanu Raghavapudi	Debut in Telugu cinema

=== Web series ===
Denotes web series that have not yet been released

Year	Film	Creator	Ref.
2024	Heeramandi	Sanjay Leela Bhansali	

=== Documentary ===
- Sachin: A Billion Dreams (2017) - a multi-lingual (English, Hindi, Marathi) documentary sports film.

== Awards and nominations ==
Year	Film	Award	Category	Result	Ref.
2008	Chak De! India	2008 Zee Cine Awards	Zee Cine Award for Best Cinematography	Won	
2008	Chak De! India	53rd Filmfare Awards	Filmfare Award for Best Cinematography	Won	
2008	Chak De! India	9th IIFA Awards	IIFA Award for Best Cinematography	Won	
2008	Chak De! India	Screen Awards	Screen Award for Best Cinematography	Won	
2011	Guzaarish	Apsara Award	Best Cinematographer	Won	
2014	Chotushkone		National Award	Won	
2015	Bajirao Mastani		National Award	Won	
2015	Bajirao Mastani		Filmfare Award	Won	
2015	Bajirao Mastani		Screen Award	Won	
2015	Bajirao Mastani		IIFA Award	Won	
2015	Bajirao Mastani		Apsara Award	Won	
