= IIFA Award for Best Cinematography =

Annual film award in India

The IIFA Award for Best Cinematography is a technical award chosen ahead of the ceremonies.

== Multiple wins ==
Wins	Recipient
3	Sudeep Chatterjee, ISC

== Awards ==
Year	Winner	Film
2008	Sudeep Chatterjee, ISC	Chak De India
2009	Jason West	Rock On!!
2010	C. K. Muraleedharan ISC	3 Idiots
2011	Carlos Catalan	Zindagi Na Milegi Dobara
2012	Ravi Varman, ISC	Barfi!
2015	Binod Pradhan	2 States
2016	Sudeep Chatterjee, ISC	Bajirao Mastani
2017	Anil Mehta, ISC & WICA	Ae Dil Hai Mushkil
2018	Marcin Laskawiec, IDC	Tiger Zinda Hai
2019	Sudeep Chatterjee, ISC	Padmaavat
2020	Jay Oza	Gully Boy
2022	Avik Mukhopadhyay	Sardar Udham
2023	Sudeep Chatterjee	Gangubai Kathiawadi
2024	G. K. Vishnu	Jawan

== See also ==
- IIFA Awards
- Bollywood
- Cinema of India
