= Rau (novel) =

1972 novel by Nagnath S. Inamdar

- Front cover of the novel
- Author: Nagnath S. Inamdar
- Translator: Vikrant Pande, Bharatiya Jnanpith
- Genre: Historical fiction Romance
- Publisher: Continental Prakashan
- Publication date: 1972
- Publication place: India
- Pages: 418

Rau (also referred to as Rauu) is a 1972 Marathi historical fiction novel by N S Inamdar. The story revolves around the fictionalized romance between real-life historical characters of the Maratha dynasty's Military General Peshwa Baji Rao I and his second wife Mastani (born of a Hindu father and Muslim mother). The novel revolves around the outrage caused by the relationship among Baji Rao's family members and crippling orthodoxy.

Rau was adapted into a feature film in 2015 as Bajirao Mastani, it was directed by Sanjay Leela Bhansali and starred Ranveer Singh, Deepika Padukone and Priyanka Chopra in lead roles. The novel has also been used as a basis for several other films and TV series in both Hindi and Marathi since its released.

== Translations ==
- 2008 - The book was translated to Hindi in 2008 and published under the title Rau Swami by Bharatiya Jnanpith
- 2016 - The book was translated to English by Vikrant Pande in 2016 and published under the title Rau: The great love story of Bajirao Mastani by Pan Macmillan.
