= Prasad Sutar =

Indian visual effects designer

- Occupation: Visual Effects Supervisor

Prasad Vasant Sutar is an Indian visual effects designer, coordinator and supervisor known for his works exclusively in Hindi cinema Prasad currently works at NYVFXWala as a visual effects designer, coordinator and supervisor in collaboration with Ajay Devgan

== Awards ==
- Asian Film Awards (AFA) Best Visual Effects - Bajirao Mastani
- International Indian Film Academy (IIFA) Best Special Effects - Bajirao Mastani
- Screen Awards Best Special Effects - Bajirao Mastani
- Zee Cine Awards for Best Special Effects - Bajirao Mastani
- Filmfare Award for Best Visual Effects - Tanhaji: The Unsung Warrior

== Filmography ==
- 2020 Tanhaji (visual effects supervisor)
- 2023 Adipurush (visual effects supervisor)
- 2023 Ponniyin Selvan: II (visual effects supervisor)
- 2022 Ponniyin Selvan: I (visual effects supervisor)
- 2018 Padmaavat (visual effects supervisor)
- 2016 Dangal
- 2015 Bajirao Mastani (visual effects supervisor)
- 2015 Tamasha (visual effects)
- 2015 Katyar Kaljat Ghusali (visual effects head)
- 2015 Prem Ratan Dhan Payo (visual effects supervisor)
- 2014 Kill Dil (visual effects supervisor)
- 2014 Samrat & Co. (visual effects supervisor)
- 2014 2 States (visual effects supervisor)
- 2013 Ankhon Dekhi (visual effects supervisor)
- 2013 Gori Tere Pyaar Mein (visual effects supervisor)
- 2013 Goliyon Ki Rasleela Ram-Leela (visual effects supervisor)
- 2013 Besharam (visual effects)
- 2013 Once Upon a Time in Mumbai Dobaara! (visual effects supervisor)
- 2013 Mere Dad Ki Maruti (visual effects supervisor)
- 2012 Agneepath (visual effects supervisor)
- 2011 Don 2 (visual effects supervisor)
- 2011 Bodyguard (visual effects supervisor)
- 2011 Delhi Belly (visual effects supervisor)
- 2010 Tees Maar Khan (visual effects supervisor)
- 2010 Dabangg (visual effects supervisor)
- 2010 We Are Family (visual effects supervisor)
- 2010 Once Upon a Time in Mumbaai (visual effects supervisor)
- 2010 I Hate Luv Storys (visual effects supervisor)
- 2010 Raajneeti (visual effects supervisor)
