= Sanjay Leela Bhansali =

Indian filmmaker (born 1963)

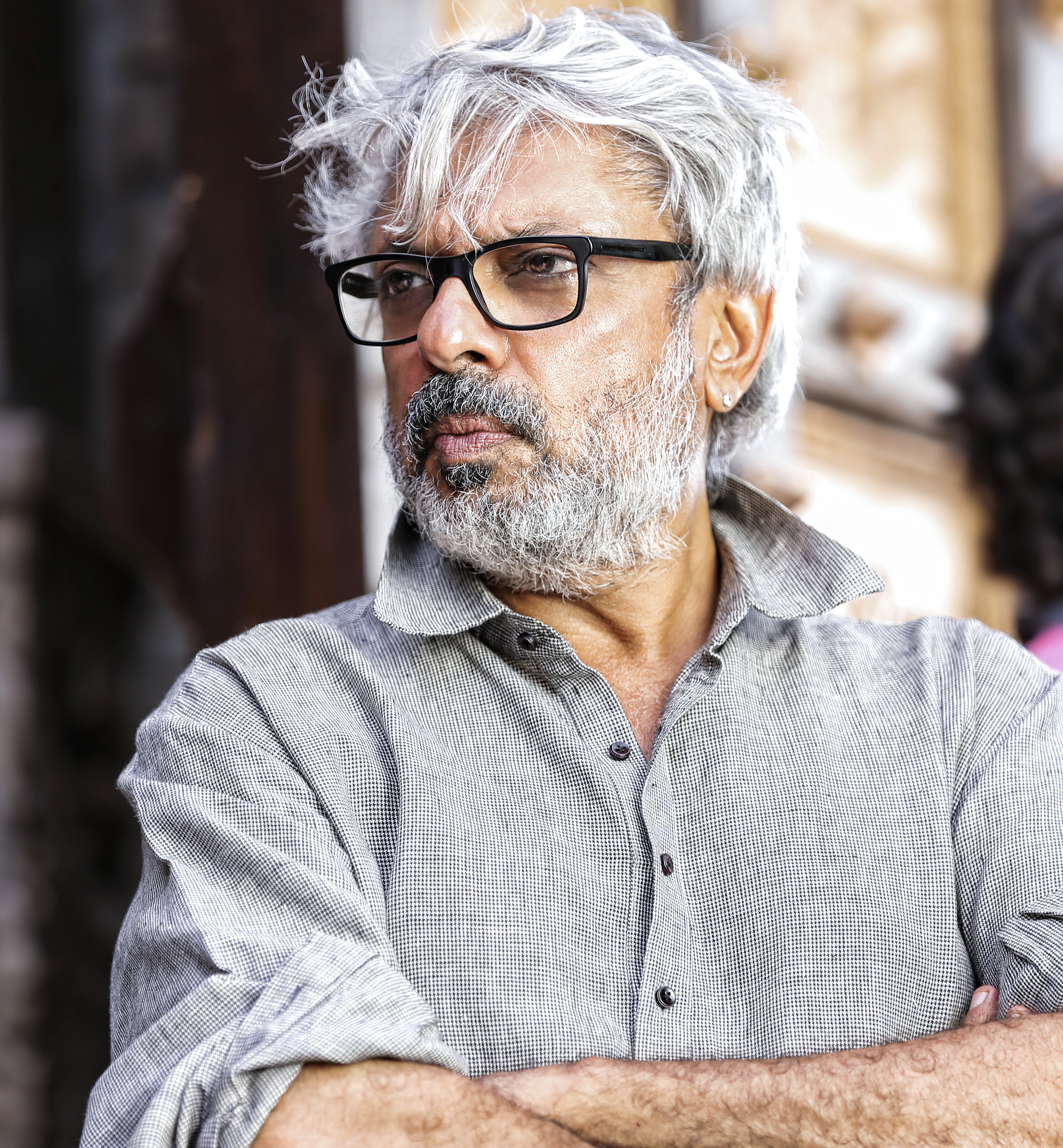
- Bhansali in 2021
- Born: 24 February 1963 (age 63); Bombay, Maharashtra, India
- Occupations: Filmmaker; music composer
- Years active: 1996–present
- Relatives: Sharmin Segal (niece)
- Awards: Full list
- Honours: Padma Shri (2015)

Signature
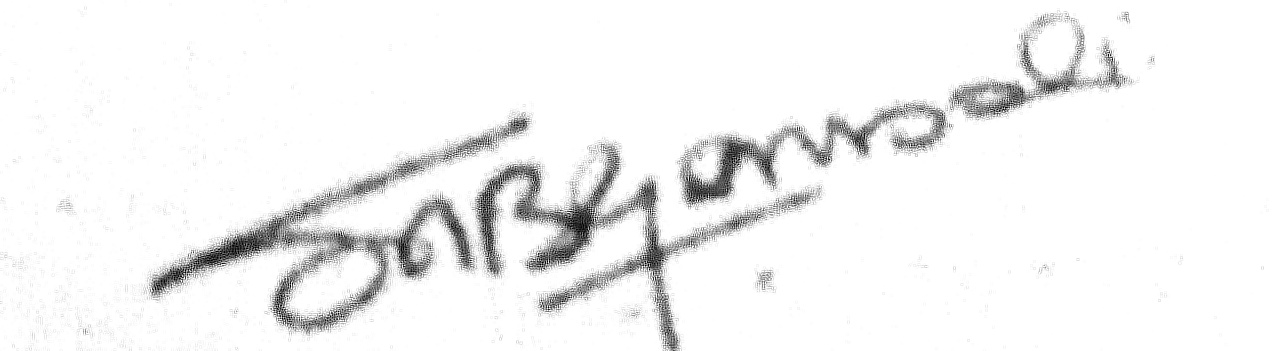

Sanjay Navin Bhansali (Note: Wikipedia uses legal name for a subject's introduction. Bhansali's production company and his director profile registered with Ministry of Corporate Affairs have his name as Sanjay Navin Bhansali) (born 24 February 1963), known professionally as Sanjay Leela Bhansali, (Note: Gujarati pronunciation: [ˈsəndʒeː ˈlilɑ ˈbʱəɳsɑli]. In this Indian name, Leela is a matronymic and the family name is Bhansali.) is an Indian filmmaker and music composer, who works in Hindi cinema. He is the recipient of several awards, including seven National Film Awards and thirteen Filmfare Awards, in addition to a BAFTA Award nomination. In 2015, the Government of India honoured him with the Padma Shri, the fourth-highest civilian award. Bhansali is best known for his use of aesthetics and musical vision, particularly in period dramas.

Bhansali made his directorial debut with the romantic musical Khamoshi: The Musical (1996). He gained both mainstream and critical success with the romantic dramas Hum Dil De Chuke Sanam (1999) and Devdas (2002), the latter of which won the National Film Award for Best Popular Film Providing Wholesome Entertainment, and was nominated for the BAFTA Award for Best Film Not in the English Language. He won the National Film Award for Best Feature Film in Hindi for directing the drama Black (2005). His subsequent releases Saawariya (2007) and Guzaarish (2010) were box-office flops. The latter film marked his debut as a music composer. He also began producing under his banner Bhansali Productions.

Bhansali reinforced his status with the romantic tragedy Goliyon Ki Raasleela Ram-Leela (2013), and top-grossing period dramas Bajirao Mastani (2015) and Padmaavat (2018). He won the National Film Award for Best Direction for Bajirao Mastani and the National Film Award for Best Music Direction for Padmaavat. He has since directed the biopic Gangubai Kathiawadi (2022), winning further National and Filmfare Awards. In 2024, Bhansali launched his own music label, named Bhansali Music, and went on to create and direct the period drama series Heeramandi.

== Early and personal life ==
Bhansali was born on 24 February 1963 in Bhuleshwar, South Bombay into a Gujarati-Jain family. His father, Navin, was a film producer, but due to financial setbacks, he turned to alcoholism. As a result, his mother, Leela, sewed clothes to make ends meet and Navin died of cirrhosis. Bhansali adopted his mother's name as his middle name instead of his father's. He has paid tribute to his father in many of his films. In Hum Dil De Chuke Sanam (1999), Sameer's tendency of speaking to his deceased father while looking at the sky is believed to be inspired by a similar habit that Bhansali had during his childhood. His alcoholism inspired Devdas (2002), including the funeral scene. In Gangubai Kathiawadi (2022), a poster of his father's film, Jahazi Lutera (1957), can be seen in the background. Bhansali studied editing at Film and Television Institute of India. His sister, Bela Bhansali Segal, has directed Shirin Farhad Ki Toh Nikal Padi (2012), for which he wrote the script, while Bela's daughter, Sharmin Segal, made her debut as an actress under his production Malaal (2019), for which he also served as fellow writer and composer. Bhansali speaks Gujarati at home and loves Gujarati food, music, literature and architecture. He is trained in Odissi.

== Career ==
=== Early work and success (1989–2005) ===
Bhansali began his career as an assistant to Vidhu Vinod Chopra and was involved in the making of Parinda (1989) as an assistant director, 1942: A Love Story (1994) as a writer and assistant choreographer and Kareeb (1998). However, they had a falling-out when Bhansali refused to direct Kareeb. In 1996, he made his directorial debut with Khamoshi: The Musical, the commercially unsuccessful but critically acclaimed film about a daughter's struggle to communicate with her deaf-mute parents. The film earned 5 Filmfare Awards, including the Filmfare Award for Best Film (Critics).

He rose to prominence in Indian cinema with the musical love triangle Hum Dil De Chuke Sanam (1999), starring Aishwarya Rai, Salman Khan, and Ajay Devgn, which established his individualistic stamp for visual splendour and creating auras of celebration and festivity. The film was premiered in the Indian Panorama section at the 1999 International Film Festival of India. It was a critical and commercial success, and won numerous awards including 4 National Film Awards and 8 Filmfare Awards.

His next film, the period romantic drama Devdas (2002), starring Shah Rukh Khan, Aishwarya Rai and Madhuri Dixit, was Bhansali's ode to the novel of the same name, which became the highest-grossing film of the year. The film also earned widespread critical acclaim and won 10 awards at Filmfare, emerging as the most-awarded film in Filmfare at the time (tying with Dilwale Dulhania Le Jayenge (1995)). At the 50th National Film Awards, it won 5 awards including Best Popular Film Providing Wholesome Entertainment. It received a nomination for the Best Foreign Film at the British Academy of Film & Television Awards (BAFTA). It was India's submission for the Academy Award for Best Foreign Language Film. The film was also screened at the 2002 Cannes Film Festival. It stood eighth in Time magazine's "The 10 Greatest Movies of the Millennium (Thus Far)".

His next film, Black, starring Amitabh Bachchan and Rani Mukerji, broke his own all-time record of Devdas by garnering 11 awards, the highest number of awards ever given to a single film at Filmfare. It stood fifth in Time (Europe)'s "10 Best Movies of the Year 2005" among films from across the world. At the 53rd National Film Awards, he received his second National Award for Best Feature Film in Hindi. Hum Dil De Chuke Sanam, Devdas and Black earned him multiple Best Film and Best Director awards at Filmfare, the latter also received additional Best Film (Critics) award. In 2006, Bhansali participated as a judge on reality TV show Jhalak Dikhhla Jaa alongside Farah Khan and Shilpa Shetty.

=== Professional setback and expansion (2007–2012) ===
Bhansali's next film, the musical romance Saawariya (2007) was met with mixed reviews and poor collections at the box office. In 2008, Bhansali staged the opera Padmavati, an adaptation of the 1923 ballet written by Albert Roussel. The show premiered in Paris at the prestigious Théâtre du Châtelet and next at the Festival dei Due Mondi, where it received "fifteen minutes of standing ovation and seven curtain calls at the end of the first show." Bhansali received highly positive reviews from international critics for his work. In 2010, Bhansali released Guzaarish, starring Hrithik Roshan and Aishwarya Rai, in which he also made his debut in music direction. The film received positive reviews from critics, and was an above average performer at the box office. Guzaarish earned him a nomination for the Filmfare Award for Best Director. In 2011, he became a judge on the Indian music talent show X Factor India Season 1. The same year, he also produced the musical comedy My Friend Pinto, which received negative reviews and tanked at the box office. In 2012, Bhansali produced Rowdy Rathore, a remake of the Telugu film Vikramarkudu, starring Akshay Kumar and Sonakshi Sinha and directed by Prabhu Deva. The film received mixed reviews from critics and became a major commercial success, with Box Office India labelling it as a blockbuster. The following year, he produced the romantic comedy Shirin Farhad Ki Toh Nikal Padi, which also received positive reviews, but could not perform well at the box office.

=== Established filmmaker (2013–present) ===
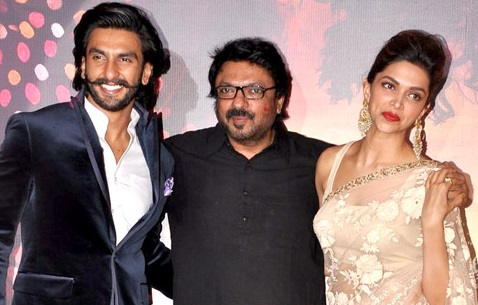
Bhansali with Ranveer Singh and Deepika Padukone during the trailer launch of Goliyon Ki Raasleela Ram-Leela in 2013.

In 2013, Bhansali directed the tragic romance Goliyon Ki Raasleela Ram-Leela, an adaptation of Shakespeare's Romeo and Juliet, starring Deepika Padukone and Ranveer Singh. Some religious groups opposed the film claiming that the former title Ramleela was misleading, because the movie had nothing to do with Ramlila, the traditional enactment of the life and story of Hindu deity, Lord Rama. The film's release had been stayed by Delhi High Court due to the controversy over its title, claiming that the movie hurt the religious sentiments of Hindus. Later the film's title was changed to Goliyon Ki Raasleela Ram-Leela, and eventually released in India as scheduled. However, after a week of release, Lucknow bench of Allahabad High Court banned the movie's release in Uttar Pradesh. Despite the controversy and limited release, the film opened to critical acclaim and strong box office collections worldwide, ultimately earning ₹2.02 billion (US$31 million) and emerging as the fifth highest-grossing film of 2013. The film garnered several award nominations for Bhansali including Best Film and Best Director nominations at Filmfare. The same year, Bhansali debuted in television with the show Saraswatichandra, starring Gautam Rode and Jennifer Winget, which he later left after few episodes.

The following year, he produced the biographical sports film Mary Kom starring Priyanka Chopra, which premiered at the 2014 Toronto International Film Festival, becoming the first Hindi film to be screened on the opening night of the festival. The film became both a critical and commercial success and received various accolades including a nomination for the Filmfare Award for Best Film. At the 62nd National Film Awards, Bhansali received another National Award for Best Popular Film Providing Wholesome Entertainment for the film. In 2015, he produced the action drama Gabbar Is Back starring Akshay Kumar, which also emerged as a commercial success and received positive reviews from critics.

Bhansali's next directorial venture was his dream project, the period romantic drama Bajirao Mastani (2015), based on the love story between Peshwa Baji Rao I and his second wife Mastani. Ranveer Singh and Deepika Padukone played the title roles, while Priyanka Chopra played Bajirao's first wife, Kashibai. The film was announced in 2003 and was constantly in the news regarding the cast, including actors such as Salman Khan, Shah Rukh Khan, Aishwarya Rai Bachchan, Kareena Kapoor and Rani Mukerji. The descendants of Bajirao I and Mastani expressed their disapproval of this film, claiming excessive creative liberty by Bhansali causing wrongful portrayal of their ancestors. A petition was filed in Bombay High Court seeking a stay on the film, but the High Court refused to interfere with its release. It received widespread critical acclaim worldwide and was listed among the best films of 2015 by several sources. Despite the controversy, the film emerged as one of the highest-grossing Indian films of all time. The film received numerous accolades at various award ceremonies in India. At the 63rd National Film Awards, Bajirao Mastani won 7 awards and Bhansali won the National Award for Best Director, in addition to winning Best Film and Best Director at Filmfare. The film was featured at the 2016 Indian Panorama section of the International Film Festival of India. Bajirao Mastani was selected as India's official entry for the Best Foreign Language Film for the 74th Golden Globe Awards. The following year, he produced the Marathi film Laal Ishq.

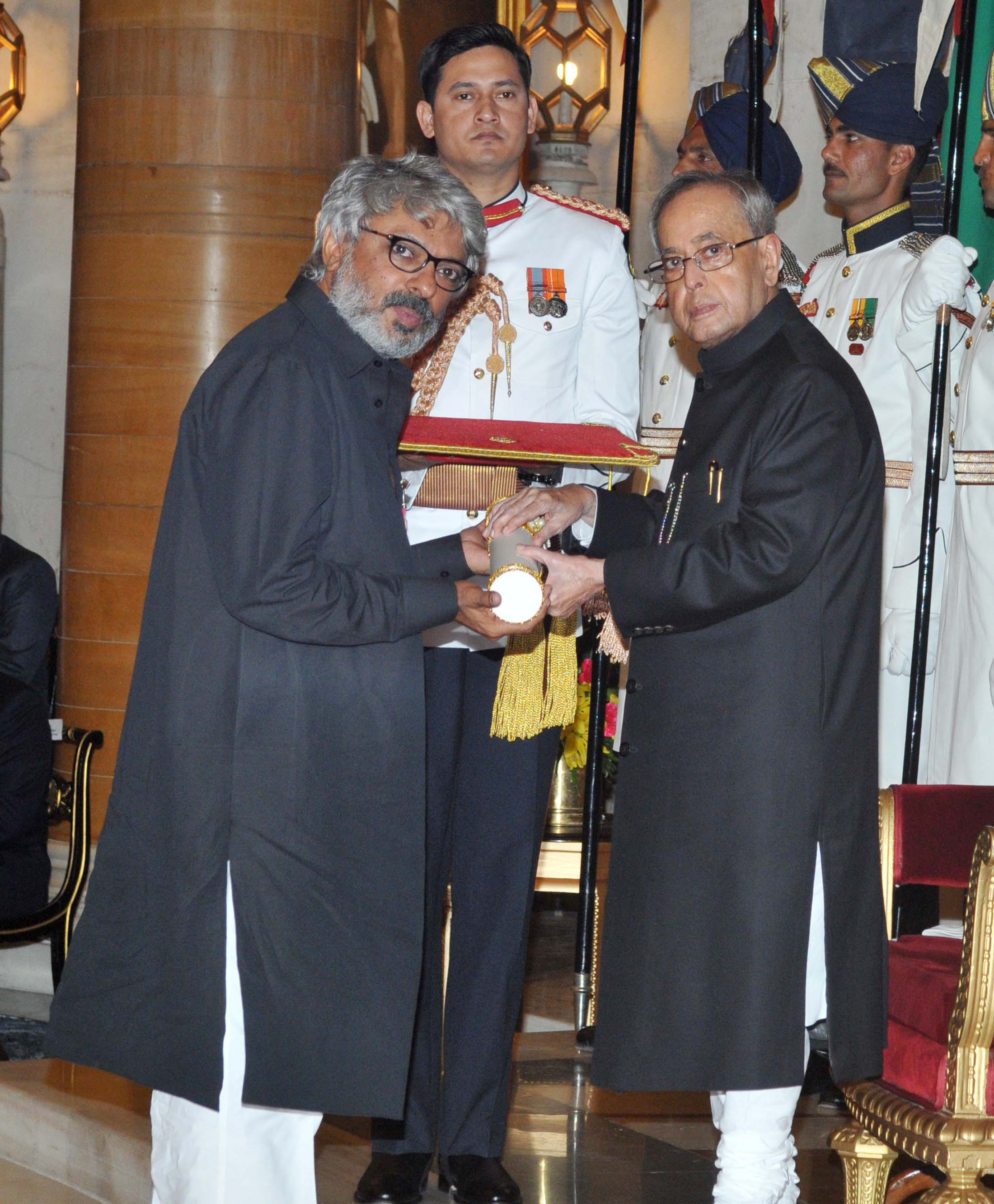
The President, Pranab Mukherjee, presenting the Padma Shri Award to Sanjay Leela Bhansali, at a Civil Investiture Ceremony, at Rashtrapati Bhavan, in New Delhi on 30 March 2015.

Bhansali directed the period drama film Padmaavat (2018), jointly produced by him and Viacom 18 Motion Pictures, and also written by him. The film stars Deepika Padukone in the title role as Rani Padmini, alongside Shahid Kapoor and Ranveer Singh in the title roles of Rawal Ratan Singh and Alauddin Khalji respectively. During the shooting of the film in January 2017 in Jaipur, the members of Shri Rajput Karni Sena protested at the sets at Jaigarh Fort, physically attacked Bhansali and his crew members, alleging that he misrepresented historical facts and depicted them erroneously in the film, and also tried to vandalise the sets. On 6 March 2017, members of Shri Rajput Karni Sena vandalised the Chittor Fort again and broke the mirrors installed in the palace of Rani Padmini. On 15 March 2017, a group of unidentified vandals again attacked and set fire to the sets of this movie in Kolhapur which led to the production set, costumes and jewelleries being burnt. The film earned Rs. 1.43 billion rupees in the first six days after its release. Padmaavat emerged as the highest-grossing film of the year, and received widespread critical acclaim, and earned Bhansali the National Film Award for Best Music Direction and the Filmfare Award for Best Music Director, in addition to Best Film and Best Director nominations at Filmfare.

In 2022, Bhansali directed Gangubai Kathiawadi, a biographical crime drama based on a chapter of Hussain Zaidi's book Mafia Queens of Mumbai. The film about Gangubai Kothewali, stars Alia Bhatt as Gangubai, and was scheduled for release on 30 July 2021, but was postponed due to the COVID-19 pandemic. The film eventually released in February 2022 to earned widespread critical acclaim, and won a leading 11 Filmfare Awards, including Best Film and Best Director wins for Bhansali, and five National Film Awards including Best Editing and Best Adapted Screenplay wins for Bhansali.

In March 2024, Bhansali launched his music label, Bhansali Music, alongside the release of the soundtrack of the Netflix series Heeramandi, on which he served as creator, director, and music composer. The series had an ensemble cast led by Manisha Koirala and Sonakshi Sinha. It had strong viewership on the platform, and has been renewed for a second season.

Bhansali will next direct Ranbir Kapoor, Alia Bhatt, and Vicky Kaushal in the romantic drama film Love & War, which is scheduled for release in 2027.

== Filmography ==
=== Films ===
Year	Title	Director	Writer	Producer	Editor	Composer	Notes
1989	Parinda	Assistant	No	No	No	No	
1994	1942: A Love Story	No	Yes	No	No	No	
1996	Khamoshi: The Musical	Yes	Yes	No	No	No	
1999	Hum Dil De Chuke Sanam	Yes	Yes	Yes	No	No	
2002	Devdas	Yes	Yes	No	No	No	
2005	Black	Yes	Yes	Yes	No	No	
2007	Saawariya	Yes	No	Yes	No	No	
2010	Guzaarish	Yes	Yes	Yes	No	Yes	
2011	My Friend Pinto	No	No	Yes	No	No	
2012	Rowdy Rathore	No	No	Yes	No	No	
2012	Shirin Farhad Ki Toh Nikal Padi	No	Yes	Yes	No	No	
2013	Goliyon Ki Raasleela Ram-Leela	Yes	Yes	Yes	Yes	Yes	
2014	Mary Kom	Creative	No	Yes	Yes	No	
2015	Gabbar Is Back	No	No	Yes	No	No	
2015	Bajirao Mastani	Yes	Yes	Yes	No	Yes	
2016	Laal Ishq	No	No	Yes	No	No	Marathi film
2018	Padmaavat	Yes	Yes	Yes	No	Yes	
2019	Malaal	No	Yes	Yes	No	Yes	
2021	Tuesdays and Fridays	No	No	Yes	No	No	
2022	Gangubai Kathiawadi	Yes	Yes	Yes	Yes	Yes	
2026	Do Deewane Seher Mein	No	No	Yes	No	No	
2027	Love & War †	Yes	Yes	Yes	Yes	Yes	Post-production

=== Television ===
Year	Title	Creator	Director	Writer	Producer	Editor	Composer	Notes
1988–1989	Bharat Ek Khoj	No	No	No	No	Yes	No	
2013–2014	Saraswatichandra	Yes	No	No	Yes	No	No	403 episodes
2024	Heeramandi	Yes	Yes	Yes	Yes	Yes	Yes	8 episodes

=== Reality show ===
Year	Title	Judge	References
2006	Jhalak Dikhhla Jaa 1	Yes	
2011	X Factor India	Yes	

=== Stage ===
Year	Title	Director	References
2006	Padmâvatî	Yes	

== Discography ==
- Sukoon (2022)
- Khadaan (2025)
