= Bajirao Mastani =

2015 Indian film by Sanjay Leela Bhansali

- Theatrical release poster
- Directed by: Sanjay Leela Bhansali
- Screenplay by: Prakash R. Kapadia; Sanjay Leela Bhansali
- Based on: Rau by Nagnath S. Inamdar
- Produced by: Sanjay Leela Bhansali; Kishore Lulla
- Starring: Ranveer Singh; Deepika Padukone; Priyanka Chopra
- Narrated by: Irrfan Khan
- Cinematography: Sudeep Chatterjee
- Edited by: Rajesh G. Pandey
- Music by: Songs: Sanjay Leela Bhansali; Score: Sanchit Balhara
- Production companies: Bhansali Productions; Eros International
- Distributed by: Eros International
- Release date: 18 December 2015
- Running time: 158 minutes
- Country: India
- Language: Hindi
- Budget: ₹145 crore
- Box office: est. ₹356.2 crore

Bajirao Mastani is a 2015 Indian Hindi-language epic historical romantic tragedy film directed by Sanjay Leela Bhansali, who co-produced it with Eros International and composed its soundtrack. The film stars Ranveer Singh, Deepika Padukone and Priyanka Chopra with Tanvi Azmi, Vaibhav Tatwawaadi, Milind Soman, Mahesh Manjrekar and Aditya Pancholi in supporting roles. Based on Nagnath S. Inamdar's Marathi novel Rau, Bajirao Mastani narrates the story of the Maratha Peshwa Bajirao I (1700–1740) and his second wife, Mastani.

Conceived as early as the 1990s, Bhansali announced the film in 2003 but production was delayed several times due to its changing cast. A passion project for Bhansali, Bajirao Mastani spent over a decade in development hell before being revived in 2014. Extensive research was done before moving into pre-production, which required the creation of twenty-two highly detailed sets, and numerous costumes and props to strengthen its opulence and high production value. Principal photography took place on sets constructed in Film City, with some portions being filmed on location. Visual effects and CGI were used in post-production to enhance a number of scenes.

Bajirao Mastani was released on 18 December 2015 and received widespread acclaim with praise for Bhansali's direction, various technical achievements, and the performances of the cast. The film has also been noted for its scale, grandeur and attention to detail. Recipient of several accolades, Bajirao Mastani won 7 National Film Awards, including Best Direction (Bhansali) and Best Supporting Actress (Azmi). The film received a leading 14 nominations at the 61st Filmfare Awards, including Best Actress (Padukone) and Best Supporting Actress (Azmi), and won a leading 9 awards, including Best Film, Best Director (Bhansali), Best Actor (Singh) and Best Supporting Actress (Chopra). At the Zee Cine Awards, Singh won Best Actor – Male (Critics) and Padukone won Best Actor – Female.

Commercially, the film was successful at the box office, grossing over ₹356.2 crore against the budget of ₹145 crore, thus becoming the 4th highest grossing Hindi film of 2015.

== Plot ==
In 1720, following the death of Peshwa Balaji Vishwanath, the court of Maratha Chhatrapati Shahu debates appointing a successor. Ambaji Pant Purandare nominates Vishwanath's young son, Bajirao, who demonstrates his tactical intelligence in a court test and is officially appointed the new Peshwa.

Ten years later, Bajirao's chief consort, Kashibai, is visited by her widowed friend Bhanu, whose husband was executed by Bajirao for espionage. Bitter and grieving, Bhanu curses Kashibai, predicting that she too will one day yearn for her husband's presence. Meanwhile, during a military campaign in Sironj, Bajirao is approached by a military envoy from Bundelkhand seeking assistance against invading forces. The envoy reveals herself to be Mastani, the warrior-princess daughter of the Hindu Rajput King Chhatrasal and his Persian Muslim consort, Ruhaani Bai. Impressed by her battlefield valor, Bajirao joins the defense and successfully repels the invaders. During the subsequent Holi celebrations, Bajirao and Mastani fall in love. Before departing, Bajirao gifts her his personal dagger, unaware that in Rajput tradition, this gesture symbolizes a formal marriage proposal. Returning to Pune, a joyful Kashibai welcomes him to their newly constructed palace, Shaniwar Wada, showcasing the Aina Mahal (Hall of Mirrors), which allows her to view his chambers from her balcony.

Driven by her devotion, Mastani arrives in Pune to claim her place as Bajirao's wife. However, Bajirao's conservative mother, Radhabai, and brother, Chimaji Appa, strongly object to her Muslim lineage. Radhabai denies her entry into the main palace and humiliates her by placing her in quarters reserved for courtesans. Mastani stoically accepts the mistreatment and publicly appeals to Chhatrapati Shahu’s court to be recognized as Bajirao's consort. Bajirao initially warns Mastani that his political duties and first marriage mean she will face continuous social ostracization, but moved by her unwavering commitment, he officially accepts her as his second wife. He then departs to secure a crucial non-aggression pact with the Nizam of Hyderabad, ensuring the stability of the Maratha Confederacy.

Upon his return, Bajirao finds both Kashibai and Mastani pregnant. That night, Kashibai looks through the Aina Mahal and witnesses Bajirao embracing Mastani. Distraught by the betrayal, she retreats to her hometown, returning months later with her newborn son, Raghunath Rao. Mastani also gives birth to a boy, whom they name Krishna Rao. When the orthodox Brahmin priests refuse to perform a Hindu naming ceremony for a child born of a Muslim mother, a defiant Bajirao declares his son will be raised as a Muslim named Shamsher Bahadur.

A few years later, Bajirao moves Mastani and Shamsher into a newly built wing at Shaniwar Wada. This decision enrages his eldest son, Nana Saheb, who has returned from his studies in Satara harboring a deep resentment toward Mastani. During a festival, Kashibai uncovers a court conspiracy to assassinate Mastani and Shamsher. She immediately alerts Bajirao, who intercepts the attackers and moves Mastani to a separate palace for her safety.

Summoned to suppress a rebellion led by the Nizam's son, Nasir Jung, Bajirao seeks Kashibai's blessings before marching into battle, as required by military custom. Kashibai performs the ritual but calmly informs him that his infidelity has permanently broken her heart and stripped away her pride. She banishes him from her personal chambers forever.

Once Bajirao departs for the battlefield, Nana Saheb and Radhabai exploit his absence by placing Mastani and Shamsher in solitary confinement. Upon learning of his family's treachery, an emotionally shattered Bajirao defeats Nasir Jung in combat but suffers a severe psychological and physical breakdown, developing a terminal fever. Stationed at a riverside military camp, his health rapidly fails. Kashibai arrives to nurse him and sends an urgent letter ordering Nana Saheb to release Mastani, realizing only her presence can save him. Nana Saheb intercepts the command, releasing only the young Shamsher while keeping Mastani chained. Delirious with high fever and hallucinating, Bajirao dies on the riverbank, while an imprisoned Mastani passes away at the exact same moment in her cell.

== Cast ==
The cast has been listed below:

- Ranveer Singh as Bajirao I: The Peshwa of the Maratha Empire and Kashibai and Mastani's husband
- Deepika Padukone as Mastani: Bajirao's second wife
- Priyanka Chopra as Kashibai: Bajirao's first wife and Nana Saheb and Ragunath's mother
- Tanvi Azmi as Radhabai, Bajirao's mother
- Milind Soman as Ambaji Pant Purandare
- Vaibhav Tatwawaadi as Chimaji Appa: Bajirao's younger brother
- Ayush Tandon as Nana Saheb: Kashibai and Bajirao's first son
  - Rudra Soni as Young Nana Saheb
- Mahesh Manjrekar as Chhatrapati Shahu
- Aditya Pancholi as Shripatrao Pratinidhi
- Raza Murad as Asaf Jah I: Nizam of Hyderabad
- Sukhada Khandkekar as Anubai
- Benjamin Gilani as Maharaja Chhatrasal
- Anuja Sathe as Bhiubai
- Yatin Karyekar as Krishna Bhatt
- Ganesh Yadav as Malhar Rao Holkar
- Snehlata Girish Vasaikar as Bhanu
- Kaartik Ahuja as Nasir Jung
- Irrfan Khan as the narrator (voice-over)

== Production ==
=== Development ===
Sanjay Leela Bhansali had conceived the historical romance about Maratha Peshwa Bajirao and his second wife Mastani even before he had directed his first feature Khamoshi: The Musical in 1996. Several other directors such as Muzaffar Ali, Manmohan Desai and Kamal Amrohi had tried to make a film about the two historical figures but they were never made. Bhansali had intended to make Bajirao Mastani after the release of Devdas (2002) and had officially announced it in 2003, with filming scheduled to begin in May 2004. The film, however, was shelved indefinitely. Reports about a possible revival had made headlines ever since; Bhansali had planned to revive it every other year but the project never came to fruition. In an interview with The Telegraph, Bhansali spoke about his intention to make Bajirao Mastani after finishing every film he made in-between, saying "I kept trying to revive it over and over again, but if there is one thing that filmmaking has taught me, it's that every film has its own destiny. And I strongly believe that the souls of ... Bajirao, Mastani and Kashibai wanted us to make this film only now." In the process, the film became a passion project for him.

After spending eleven years in development hell, Bhansali revived the project in 2014; the film was reported to be an adaptation of the Marathi-language novel Rau (1976) by Nagnath S. Inamdar. After the project was shelved, Bhansali said he struggled to put the film together and that he considered the project impossible to make. Nevertheless, he clung to his ambition to make the film someday, saying, "there is magic to it". Some film industry professionals believed it would never be made, calling it "jinxed". Bhansali always believed in the project, assuring himself the script was so powerful he had to make it one day. He told The Telegraph, "Honestly, I want very few things in life ... so I know that I am resilient enough to get them all! Deep down, I kept asking for the universe to let me make this film. When you dream very genuinely, then I believe you also get the power to fulfill it. In pursuing Bajirao Mastani, I have been resilient and very focused. I have sacrificed a lot of things".

Primarily known for making romantic dramas, Bhansali was intrigued about the romance between "two people who defied everything, just to be in love with each other", and was excited to tell a 200-year-old story. He wanted to show the relationship between Bajirao and Mastani because it was rarely depicted in history books, and little was known about it. He had long admired the Maratha backdrop and the different religions of the protagonists—Bajirao was Hindu and Mastani was Muslim—which further drove his interest towards knowing more and telling the story. He saw it as a chance to comment on religion and love, saying, "In those times, people were offended by the same things that offend them today. Through this film, I want to show that love is the greatest religion."

Prakash R. Kapadia wrote the screenplay. The makers acquired the rights of the novel and worked with historian Ninad Bedekar. Kapadia said writing the screenplay was a difficult task and a huge responsibility considering the historical context. Kapadia and Bhansali had consistently worked on the script since its conception, refining several aspects of the film. Considering the script was written twelve years before, several changes were made to it, such as the decreasing the length and increasing the pace to suit the modern audiences. Although adapted from the novel, the romance between the film's protagonists has not been well documented in history books or archives and several versions of the story exist. Many cinematic liberties were taken to build drama and highlight incidents.

=== Casting ===
Bhansali originally wanted to repeat his Hum Dil De Chuke Sanam (1999) pairing of Salman Khan with Aishwarya Rai for the eponymous roles, but could not cast them together after their highly publicised break-up. Khan then tried to suggest his then-girlfriend Katrina Kaif for the role of Mastani but things did not materialise. When the film was finally announced in 2003, Bhansali had cast Khan and Kareena Kapoor in the titular roles, with Rani Mukerji playing Baji Rao's first wife Kashibai. However, the idea was scrapped when Khan and Kapoor signed other films together. Bhansali wanted to be the first director to showcase their pairing. Hence, the film was shelved and Bhansali went on to direct other films.

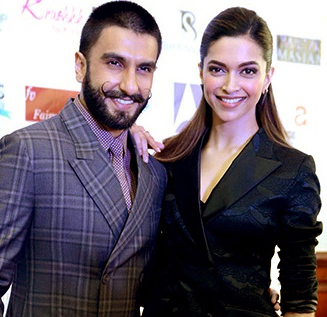
Ranveer Singh (left) and Deepika Padukone were cast to play the titular roles.

Over the following 10 years, media speculation about the production and casting of Bajirao Mastani continued. After the film was revived in 2014, reports of Ajay Devgn and Deepika Padukone being approached for the film made headlines in February. Devgn dropped out of the film, however, due to differences with Bhansali about several terms of his contract, such as dates and remuneration. Bhansali offered the role to Sushant Singh Rajput, but he had to turn down the role over scheduling issues. The next month, it was reported that Ranveer Singh was in talks to play Bajirao. The same month, reports suggested Priyanka Chopra was cast to play Kashibai, Bajirao's first wife. In July 2014, it was officially confirmed that Singh, Padukone and Chopra were finalised to play the principal roles.

Chopra was the first actor to be cast in the film; Bhansali wanted Kashibai to be cast first, only after which he could decide whom to cast for the title roles. Bhansali, who produced Chopra-starrer Mary Kom (2014), went on to that film's set in Manali to narrate it with the writer Prakash Kapadia; Bhansali was adamant in his choice of Chopra, who recalled, "The rest of the film hadn't been cast yet. My picture would be there and the pictures for Bajirao and Mastani would keep changing."

Milind Soman joined the cast in the late August 2014. In late September 2014, it was confirmed that Tanvi Azmi was cast for the role of Bajirao's mother Radhabai; Shabana Azmi, Dimple Kapadia, and Supriya Pathak had also been considered for the role. The following month, Aditya Pancholi joined the cast as an antagonist. In November 2014, the casting of Bajirao's sisters were finalised; Sukhada Khandkekar was cast as Anubai and Anuja Gokhale as Bhiubai. The following month, Mahesh Manjrekar was cast to play Maratha Emperor Chhattrapati Shahu. It was announced in January 2015 that Vaibhav Tatwawaadi was chosen to play Bajirao's younger brother Chimaji Appa. Irrfan Khan served as the film's narrator; he had previously worked with Singh and Chopra in Gunday (2014), and with Padukone in Piku (2015).

All of the actors had to undergo training before filming began; Singh and Padukone learned sword-fighting, horse-riding and the ancient Indian martial art Kalaripayattu. Singh was also required to learn Marathi and shave his head for the part, whereas Padukone had to take Kathak dance lessons. In preparation for her role of Kashibai, Chopra had 15 days of language training in the Peshwai Marathi dialect spoken during the time of the ascension of the Peshwas to perfect the accent. Azmi shaved her head completely for her role.

Singh has described his character as a "true Maratha", saying, "The deeper I get into it the more I realise what a great man he was. It is a great honour to be selected to play this character." He has said he always wanted to transform himself into a character and playing Bajirao gave him that scope, which he said was "draining and tiring in every way". For portraying Bajirao, Singh's preparations required him to isolate himself from his own being and living like Bajirao. He instructed the crew members to address him as Bajirao, which helped him to remain in his character. Singh would not respond to people who used his real name. He said, "It takes a lot of work and effort to be different from whom I am, and two hours to get ready, complete with makeup and the heavy costumes. After all this, if someone just tells me, Ranveer, your shot is ready! all that goes to waste." Padukone found her character to be very relatable, saying, "She was so brave, strong, determined and yet fragile and vulnerable". She was also inspired by her character and found playing the role challenging; it was physically demanding and required a lot of dancing. Padukone said the character had different layers; "One minute she goes on the battlefield, the next minute she's romancing him". Chopra was drawn towards the film because of her character which she thought was "very heart-breaking". She said playing Kashibai was "emotionally difficult" and a complete contrast to the strong women she has portrayed in most of her films. She described her character as someone who is "heartbroken, a silent sufferer, dignified, resilient, can't take charge of her life, goes with whatever life throws her way. Just grace under fire."

=== Pre-production ===
Considering its scale, the film required detailed and extravagant pre-production work, which required extensive research and planning. Saloni Dhatrak, Sriram Iyengar and Sujeet Sawant worked as production designers on the film. Iyengar and Sawant had heard about the film while working on another film, when it was first announced. Having never met Bhansali, they started researching on their own by visiting Pune and Satara and learnt about Maratha architecture. When the film was shelved, they continued to research and formed a portfolio, hoping to approach other filmmakers for work. Several years later, when they heard about the revival, they met Bhansali, who was impressed by their research and presentation. Bhansali wanted more research on Mughals; he engaged Dhatrak, who joined Iyengar and Sawant. Bhansali then shared the script with the art directors and described his vision and the scale of the production. Pre-production work started as early as February 2014, continued as the shoot progressed and lasted until the filming was complete in October 2015; it lasted nineteen months. Before pre-production work started, the art directors discussed with Bhansali about how much of the film would be filmed on set and outdoor locations, giving them an idea to how many sets they needed to create. Once the number of sets and location shots was decided, the production moved forward.

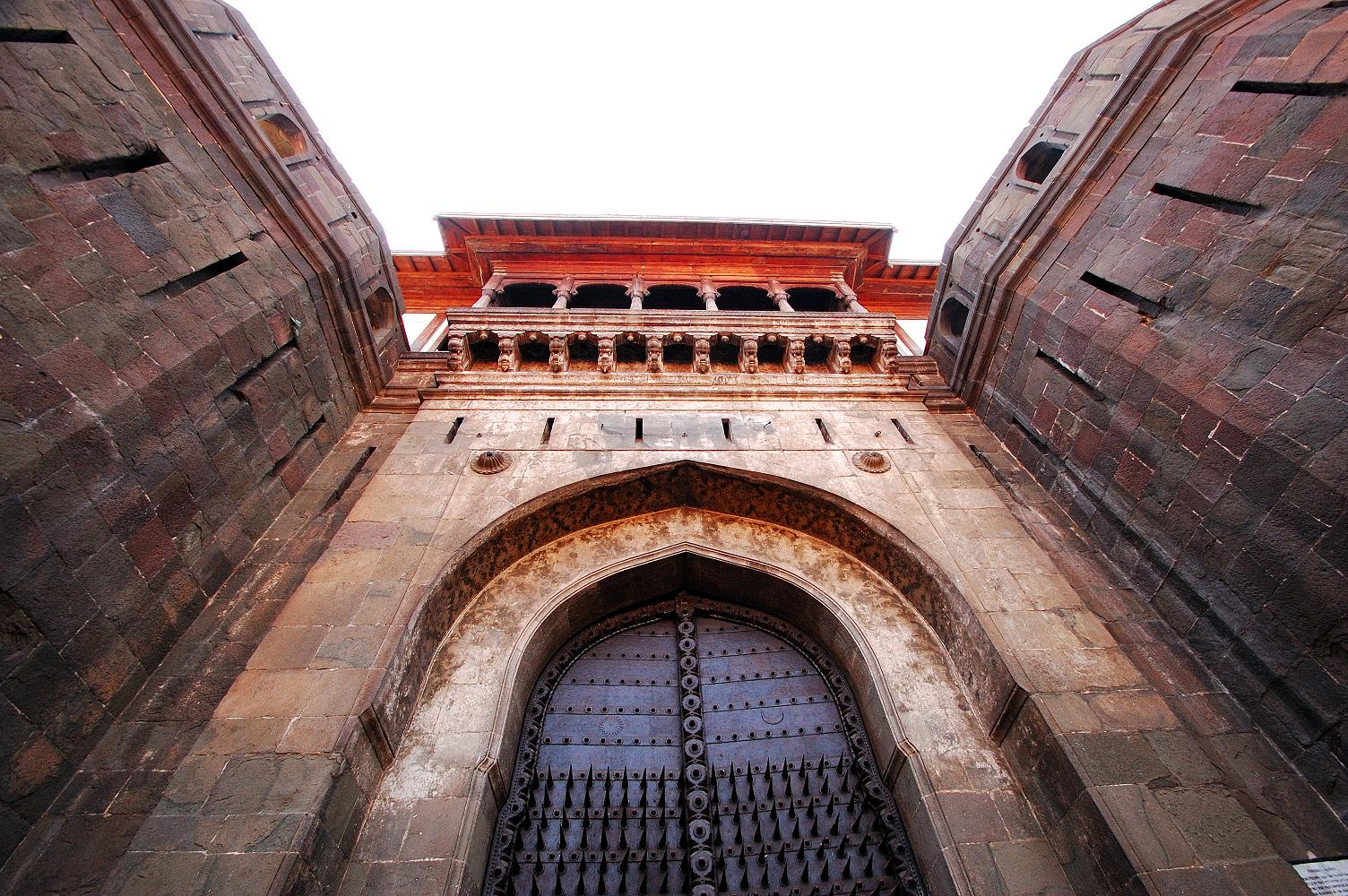
The set for Shaniwar Wada was the biggest set created for the film.

Along with the art directors, nineteen art assistant directors, including architects, designers, sketch artists and props artists, were involved. Twenty-two sets were created in Film City following a flow chart that included around 960 sketches and countless layouts. The two biggest sets were the exact replicas of Shaniwar Wada and the Aaina Mahal, both of which were "high on grandeur and intricacy". The Shaniwar Wada set was the biggest set they had constructed; it took 45,000 planks and 600 workers a day to erect. It was constructed on Sunil Maidan, one of the biggest open spaces in Film City and took forty-five days to build. Kashibai's room was the first set to be constructed, which was approved after navigating through twenty-five designs. The art directors did architectural research from Pune, Nasik and Satara, studying fortifications, baston walls and city gates to understand the interior and exterior designs of the ancient period and incorporated those ideas into building Kashibai's villa. Lotus motifs on mud-clad walls and handmade textures were used to give the set a realistic appearance.

Aina Mahal took 4,500 planks, with a hundred workers per day. The set was given a lotus-like design, with walls, ceiling and floor made out of handmade mud embedded with sparkling mirror designs. The replica of Aina Mahal was constructed in forty days, with more than 30,000 square feet of mirrors. More than 700 design stencils were used to decorate the hall. Although the mirror hall was a Mughal concept, the art directors designed it to look like Maratha architecture. The Mastani Mahal palace was built as an amalgamation of Rajput and Maratha architecture. The exterior of Mastani Mahal was built as a part of Shaniwar Wada, whereas the interiors of were built on separate sets consisting of a courtyard and bedroom. Mastani's room in Bundelkhand was crafted using a mix of Persian, Mughal and Rajput motifs and architecture.

All of the sets were furnished with opulent objects and props to give the interiors a feel of the ancient Maratha Empire. Only earthen diyas and torches were used to light the sets. Silken saris were used, with bedsheets and hand-painted walls with 18th-century motifs added. Craftsmen were hired to recreate 18th-century textures, fabrics, weaponry, jewellery and furniture. Almost 30,000 oil lamps were made for the film and 500 suits of armour were designed for the war scenes. There were also headgear and boots worn in that period. The armour and headgear weighed between ten-twenty kilos and two kilos, respectively. The team also designed props including different types of tents, lighting props, and elephant and horse decors for the war sequences. The props were made in Mumbai and had to be taken to Rajasthan, the outdoor location.

=== Costumes ===
The film's costumes were designed by Anju Modi and Maxima Basu. Modi designed clothes for the three lead characters and Basu designed for the supporting cast. The costumes for extras and war extras were done by Ajay and Chandrakant, respectively. Bhansali had detailed script-reading sessions with the designers to help them understand the characters, their emotions and personalities, which would mirror the costumes and the grandeur of the 18th century. Basu started her research by visiting several ancient monuments such as the Chowmahalla Palace, Chhatrapati Shivaji Maharaj Vastu Sangrahalaya, Salar Jung Museum and Ajanta-Ellora caves, which gave her some perspective of ancient Maharastrian culture. She also travelled to cities such as Indore, Chanderi, Paithan and Maheshwar to gather more knowledge about the history of clothing and textiles.

About 300 costumes were designed for the three leads alone. Real zari and gold wires were used to weave the costumes. Since no pictures of Kashibai existed, the paintings of Raja Ravi Varma were used as a reference for designing her looks and costumes. Modi had designed eighty nauvari or nine-yard saris with bright colours such as yellows, hot pink, emerald green and purple, inspired from the Raja Ravi Varma paintings, for Chopra. The custom-made nine-yard saris were weaved by craftsmen from Maheshwar, Chanderi and Varanasi; they were made a little lighter than usual to avoid making Chopra look large on screen. For making the saris, fabrics such as silk, muslin, khadi and chanderi worn in that period were designed. For one song sequence featuring Chopra, Modi had created six sets of the same sari.

Peshwas used to wear Dhotis, Jamas and Angarkhas with a large flare in that period, so it was eminent for Bajirao's character. A wide palette of solid colours, such as white and cream, were used for the sombre and emotional scenes whereas red, orange, blue and deep purple were used for the celebratory scenes. For designing the Bajirao's armour, chain mail, khaki and steel grey were employed. A dandpatta sword was also made for him. For Mastani, Modi used a mix of Persian and Muslim clothing of muslin, khadi and thin chanderi fabrics, with mukaish and zardosi hand embroidery to depict her half-Muslim heritage. Padukone was predominantly given shararas and its derivatives such trailing shararas, shararas with less flare and crinkled shararas made of chiffon. She was given a lehenga for just one scene. She was also given Odhnis, dupattas, veils, floor-skimming anarkalis and angrakhas paired with Farshi Pajamas. Softer colours with Persian influences such as shades of powder blue, mint green, pale yellow, aqua blue, powder pink and other typical porcelain colours were used for her clothes. A turban embellished with jewellery such as uncut diamonds and pearls was designed. For one of the Mastani costumes, Modi designed a five-layered outfit consisting of an angrakha jacket, a woven leheria dupatta, sharara and inner kurti.

Expensive and real jewellery was used in the film. The designers created the jewellery for each character. Modi said they did not want to compromise, so the best materials such as real Basra pearls, antique stones and uncut diamonds were used to give the royal look needed for the characters. Traditional Marathi-style jewellery was used to style Kashibai, while for Mastani Nizami and polki Jewellery was used. Several Indian jewellery designers, including PN Gadgil from Pune and Shri Hari Jewellers from Delhi, were hired. The costume and production designers also researched in museums, art galleries, history books, paintings, palaces, temples and forts to study the textiles, colour palettes and artwork of the ancient Maratha Empire.

=== Principal photography ===
Cinematographer Sudeep Chatterjee shot the film using Arri Alexa XT lenses. Chatterjee had done extensive research before starting the film. Principal photography began on 9 October 2014 with Chopra on the set in Film City, Mumbai. Later that month, Singh joined the shoot. Most of the film was shot on the highly detailed sets. In late November, Chopra fainted on the set due to exhaustion while filming a scene that needed to be filmed ten times continuously. A doctor was called and filming stopped for some time but she later resumed the shoot. Padukone joined the cast for two days during late December 2014 and resumed shooting in April 2015 after completing work for her other projects.

Outdoor location filming began in February 2015 at Amer Fort in Jaipur. Crowd scenes were also filmed there. Singh fell off a horse while filming an action sequence and was rushed to hospital; he was not seriously injured. In May 2015, however, he injured his shoulder and needed surgery; he resumed shooting after break of two months.

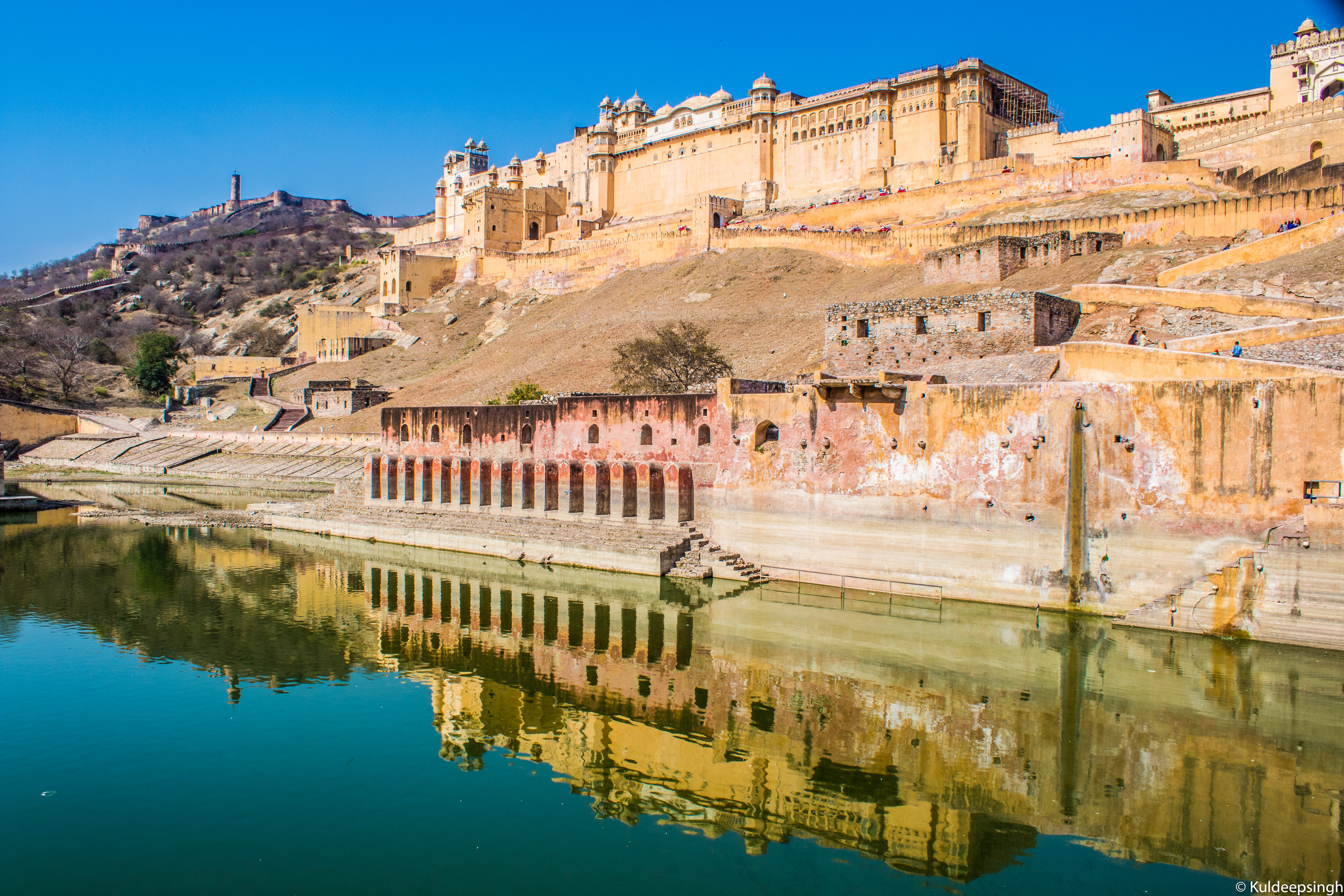
Some of the outdoor scenes were filmed at the Amer Fort

Chopra resumed filming in the first week of April 2015 for a month. While working on Bajirao Mastani, Chopra was simultaneously filming the American television series Quantico in Montreal, requiring much back-and forth travel. She would act for Bajirao Mastani at weekends and return to Montreal on weekdays for her series, returning to India in the second week of October to complete the final schedule.

Before starting the film, the team discussed which parts of it had to be filmed and which parts needed to be made using visual effects. They decided that only sequences that were considered difficult or impossible to film would be created using visual effects in post production. In one sequence, it was impossible to control the movements of the 300–400 horses standing at one position in a battle scene; this sequence was filmed with a small number of horses and was later enhanced in post production.

Sham Kaushal co-ordinated the action sequences for the war scenes. Three war sequences were filmed in Rajasthan, Madhya Pradesh and Maharashtra. Chatterjee found the war sequences challenging and faced many difficulties while filming in the deserts of Rajasthan. Wanting to break with norms, Bhansali wanted a night-time war sequence; lighting a large, open field became very difficult and visibility issues were inevitable. Bhansali wanted very clear images. Instead, they decided to shoot these scenes in the morning, aiming for a twilight look. The main war scene featuring 800 extras, 500 horses and twenty-five elephants was filmed over twenty days near Jaipur. The extras would begin costuming, which included beards for the Mughals, moustaches for the Marathas, armours, helmets and uniforms, at 04:00 for the start of filming at 08:00. After finishing the shoot, the costumes would be washed in readiness for 04:00 the following day. Kaushal has said extensive research was done before filming the war sequences, and a rough graph was designed nine months before the filming. However, the entire sequence could not be filmed in one take on location and was completed later in a studio in Film City, and was enhanced in post production.

Ganesh Acharya, Remo D'Souza, Pony Verma, Shampa Gopikrishna and Pandit Birju Maharaj were the choreographers for the film's song sequences. Bhansali chose D'Souza, who had only choreographed modern dance numbers at that time, to choreograph the song "Pinga", which took weeks to complete. Chopra and Padukone had to rehearse for several days before shooting. The filming was challenging for Chopra and Padukone; they had to shoot for the dance sequences multiple times whenever the diyas and torches used to light up the background would snuff. The song was shot at night on an open-air set decorated with diyas and torches, many of which would snuff out while filming the song. When it was suggested snuffed diyas should be corrected in post production, Bhansali outright refused. More than twelve people would run around the set with candles and oil to relight them.

The sound recording was done on location. Sound designer Nihar Ranjan Samal said they had to be careful that sounds of vehicles and honking did not make their way into the recording. A number of scenes needed re-recording because of some disturbance. Bajirao Mastani was shot in 217 days between October 2014 and October 2015.

=== Post-production ===
The film contains 1,400 visual effects shots. The company that worked on the effects was NY VFXWAALA; this was the biggest projects they had undertaken. Prasad Sutar was the visual effects supervisor; the effects took eight months and a team of sixty artists to create. Although the film was shot on highly detailed sets, visual effects and CGI was incorporated in post-production to enhance the imagery for the scenes that were impossible to shoot in live action.

The effects included the creation of interior architecture, backgrounds, set extensions and war weapons; changes to lighting and time of day, weather effects and the multiplication of army soldiers. The opening night-time war scene, which had 300 visual effects shots, was filmed in bright daylight then converted into night. Arrows flying over the battlefield were created using CGI whereas the army, soldiers and horses were multiplied. The war close-up shots were filmed in a studio but were later mixed with the war scenes to form a detailed scene. In some shots, the sky was digitally replaced and CGI forts were added in others. Similarly, the climax sequence, which was shot live in water, was enhanced using CGI horses, arrows and fireballs. The climax scene took around twenty days to complete with fine details.

Bhansali wanted a grand opening title design, which the team decided to create using animation. They crafted hand-drawn storyboards and drew a narration of Bajirao and his kingdom, and designed it digitally using animation within a limited timeline. A sequence in which Singh crosses the sea in a boat at night was created using visual effects. Splashing waves, falling rain falling (except for the water falling on Singh and the night sky were created in post production. The scenes that were shot on set and featured outside views, such as views from windows, were completed in post production. For dark, emotional scenes, a low-key background was created, whereas bright, colourful backgrounds were created with effects for light scenes. The film was edited by Rajesh G. Pandey.

== Soundtrack ==
The original score of the film was composed by Sanchit Balhara and the soundtrack album was composed by Bhansali. The lyrics are written by Siddharth–Garima, A. M. Turaz, Nasir Faraaz and Prashant Ingole. The album consists of ten original songs with vocals by Shreya Ghoshal, Arijit Singh, Vishal Dadlani, Shashi Suman, Kunal Pandit, Prithvi Gandharva, Kanika Joshi, Rashi Raagga, Geetikka Manjrekar, Payal Dev, Shreyas Puranik, Vaishali Mhade, Javed Bashir, Ganesh Chandanshive and Sukhwinder Singh. The soundtrack was released by Eros Music on 31 October 2015.

The soundtrack album was well received by music critics, who praised the soulful compositions and called them "melodious and fresh". R. M. Vijayakar of India-West gave the album 4.5 out of 5, calling it "unforgettable" and complimented the use of musical instruments and orchestration, noting portions of the score as the most significant standout. Firstpost gave a highly positive review, praising the "elegantly arranged and opulently orchestrated" songs and writing, "exhilarating soundtrack ... recreates an era gone-by through sounds that are authentic ... yet operatic, steeped in the classical ethos, yet contemporary". Joginder Tuteja of Bollywood Hungama gave a rating of 3.5 out of 5, calling it "high on classical base" and saying half of the compositions were situational and narrative-based that can "be expected to make a good impression on screen". The Indian Express also gave it a 3.5 out of 5, noting its distinct sound and its "balance between restraint and exuberance" and wrote, "Bajirao Mastani sounds fresh, like carefully restored music from Bajirao's times".

== Marketing and release ==
Bajirao Mastani was one of the most anticipated releases of 2015. Special care was taken to avoid leaks during production; everything was done in secrecy. On 15 July 2015, a day before the teaser release, producers Eros International shared the first images of the three characters and a teaser poster of the film. The three-minute teaser trailer, with only one line of dialogue, was released on 16 July 2015. The teaser garnered high praise from all quarters and was deemed "grand" and "epic". News18 called the teaser "regal, grand and breathtaking", and wrote that it had all the signature Bhansali elements such as "the big sets, larger than life characters, lots of colours and a tragic love story in the midst of all this grandeur". India Today wrote, "With its royal canvas, Bajirao Mastani teaser is a burst of colours and action reminiscent of the 18th century". In early November 2015, characters posters of the three characters were also unveiled. The trailer was released on 20 November 2015 and was also well received.

As a part of the promotions, a multi-episode graphic web series – India's first – titled Blazing Bajirao was released digitally in November 2015. Featuring the animated avatars of Bajirao, Kashibai and Mastani, the graphic series narrates the tales of Bajirao's heroism and his relationship with his two wives. This was followed by a video game titled Blazing Bajirao – The Game the next month. Released on the App Store and Google Play, the interactive game requires its players to fight enemies as Peshwa Bajirao. A multi-city press tour, which saw Singh and Padukone visiting several cities, was designed to promote the film. Chopra, who could not be in India for the promotions as she was filming for Quantico, promoted the film in the United States at a press conference in New York City.

The descendants of Bajirao, Kashibai and Mastani expressed their disapproval of "Malhari" and "Pinga" dance sequences, the midriff-baring saris worn by Kashibai and Mastani in the song "Pinga", a dialogue deeming it "vulgar" and a "private moment" shown in the trailer, claiming excessive creative liberty was taken by the director. Though not against the release of the film, the descendants publicly asked the makers to remove those two songs and screen the film for them so they could review and suggest Bhansali remove other "objectionable content" from the film. Bhansali did not respond. Additionally, a petition was filed by an activist in Bombay High Court seeking stay on the film for the two aforementioned songs, accusing it of "distorting history"; the High Court rejected the petition and refused to interfere with the film's release.

One of the most expensive Hindi films ever made, Bajirao Mastani cost ₹125 crore to make and an additional ₹20 crore for marketing and advertisements; its total budget was ₹145 crore. Even before its release, the film recovered almost all of its production costs – ₹120 crore – from sales of its satellite rights, music rights and overseas rights being sold for ₹50 crore and ₹70 crore, respectively. The film was released on 18 December 2015 on 2,700 screens worldwide. Although the makers had booked the date a year in advance, the makers of Dilwale decided to release their film on the same date, causing a highly publicized clash between the two films. Bajirao Mastani had to share the 5,000 domestic screens with Dilwale in a 40:60 ratio.

Distributed by Eros Home Video, the film was released on DVD and Blu-ray on 18 March 2016. The DVD version was released in all regions as a two-disc pack in NTSC widescreen format; bonus content included documentaries about the making of the film, its sets, costumes, music, movie images and deleted scenes. A VCD version was released at the same time. The film was also released digitally on platforms such as iTunes. It is also available on the company's streaming service Eros Now. Bajirao Mastani had its world television premiere on 23 April 2016 on Colors TV.

== Reception ==
=== Critical response ===
Bajirao Mastani received widespread critical acclaim upon release.

Writing for Firstpost, Subhash K. Jha gave it 5 stars out of 5, calling it a "masterpiece", and comparing it favorably with Mughal-e-Azam (1960). Anupama Chopra from Hindustan Times gave 4.5 stars out of 5, terming it "soaring, searing and visually sumptuous", and writing, "Bajirao Mastani plays out a like an operatic, swooning, feverish love poem." She felt that Singh wasn't "instantly convincing", but nonetheless praised him (as the film progressed) for "combin[ing] towering strength with aching vulnerability and helplessness", Chopra for having the "maximum impact" despite fewer scenes, and called Padukone "riveting". However, she criticized Azmi's acting. The Times of India also gave 4 stars out of 5, pointing out its "outstanding" cinematography and writing, "Every visual resembles a grand painting – courts with shadows and chandeliers, courtiers with tilaks and teers, chambers gleaming with mirrors, skies blushing with passion."

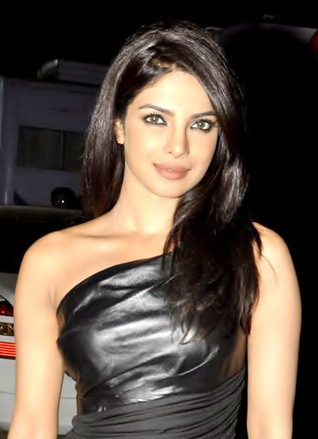
Priyanka Chopra (pictured in 2011) received widespread praise and several awards for her performance.

Taran Adarsh from Bollywood Hungama gave 4 stars out of 5, describing it as "a cinematic gem", and wrote that "fascinating characters and inspirational sub-plots [in the film] advances into a stunning culmination". Zee News also gave 4 stars out of 5 and said, "An outright outshining piece of art made unblemished, sprinkled with sincerity and discipline of acting – this love folklore will restore the drama lovers, back in their ‘expectation’ block". Shubha Shetty-Saha of Mid-Day gave 3.5 stars out of 5, and wrote, "Sanjay Leela Bhansali in his characteristic style narrates his version of the story in a Mughal-e-Azam-esque scale of grandiosity, replete with breathtakingly beautiful sets, elaborate and well thought of costumes and accessories and dreamy cinematography", which transports the viewers to a "unique and stunningly beautiful world." Ananya Bhattacharya of India Today also rated the film 3.5 out of 5, calling it "an experience", and Bhansali "a master love-storyteller". She praised the performance, saying, "Singh, Padukone, Chopra shine ... while Azmi plays the intimidating matriarch with elan"; thought she thought the editing "could have been much crisper".

Writing for NDTV, Saibal Chatterjee gave the film 3.5 stars out of 5, and said, "There isn't a dull moment in this colorful and dramatic film that embraces excess with unabashed abandon." Giving a rating of 3 stars out of 5, Rajeev Masand described the film as "artistic, but exhausting" and was critical of the film's length. He praised the cinematography, production design and performances; he credited Chopra for bringing "grace to the character, and practically steal[ing] the film"; Padukone for bringing "heft" to her fight scenes, although he found her character to be "strictly one-dimensional and tedious"; and Singh for finding his character's hidden vulnerabilities.

Namrata Joshi of The Hindu called the film a "historical leap", and wrote, "Bhansali returns with another visual spectacle that willfully takes liberties with the past that it depicts. But it does manage to engage even as it exhausts." Conversely, Raja Sen of Rediff.com was unimpressed with the film for favoring visual splendour over storyline, rating it 2.5 stars out of 5. He praised Chopra and Singh, calling them "terrific", but criticized Padukone's performance, writing "Padukone look giddily entranced, there are times when she appears completely lost. It doesn't help that she's entirely eaten up by Chopra, who, while not in the title, owns Bajirao Mastani." Shubhra Gupta of The Indian Express was also disappointed with the film, writing, "Bajirao Mastani had the potential to be a terrific historical. You want to be transported. What it ends up being is a costume drama: too many costumes, too much revved-up, empty drama, and too little plot."

On 3 April 2024, the song “Deewani Mastani”, featuring Deepika Padukone, Ranveer Singh and Priyanka Chopra, was shared as an Instagram Reel on the academy official Instagram account.

=== Box office ===
Bajirao Mastani was a major commercial success, grossing over ₹254 crore in India and over ₹102.2 crore in the overseas market for a worldwide box office gross of over ₹356.2 crore. The overseas collections comprised earnings from five major markets; United States and Canada, United Kingdom, Middle-east, Australia and the rest of the world; with earnings of ₹44 crore, ₹13.8 crore, ₹20.2 crore, ₹5.7 crore and ₹18.5 crore, respectively. As of September 2017, it is the fourth-highest-grossing Bollywood film of 2015, the third-highest-grossing Bollywood film in overseas markets in 2015, the ninth-highest-grossing Bollywood film and one of the highest-grossing Indian films of all time.

The film collected ₹12.8 crore nett on its opening day, which was the tenth-highest of the year. On its second day the film saw growth in its collection as it collected ₹15.52 crore nett. The film showed further growth on its third day as it collected ₹18.45 crore nett to take its first weekend total to ₹46.77 crore nett. In its opening weekend, the film debuted at number 10 at the U.S. box office and at number 7 at the UK box office. The film's worldwide opening weekend earning was over ₹91.5 crore. The film remained very strong on its first Monday, dropping by only 15% and earning ₹10.25 crore nett.

The film maintained its strong box office run on weekdays. Bajirao Mastani earned ₹84.36 crore nett in the first week at the domestic box office, while the first-week worldwide collections were over ₹160 crore. Its first week domestic collection was the fourth-highest of the year. Revenues grew nearly 20% on its second Friday, earning ₹12.5 crore nett. The film earned over ₹31.1 crore in its second weekend and collected a further ₹5.25 crore on the second Monday for an eleven-day domestic total of ₹141 crore nett. In the second week, the film earned approximately ₹55.2 crore. The film registered the fourth-highest third-week collections of all time, earning a ₹27 crore. After its fourth week collection of ₹7 crore, the film's domestic earnings stood at ₹175 crore nett. In its fifth weekend, the film continued to perform well in India, with the best fifth-weekend collections of all the 2015 releases.

== Accolades ==
Bajirao Mastani received 5 nominations at the 10th Asian Film Awards, including Best Film, and won Best Special Effects. At the 63rd National Film Awards, Bajirao Mastani received 7 awards, including Best Director (Bhansali), Best Supporting Actress (Azmi), Best Cinematography (Chatterjee), and Best Art Direction. The film received a leading 14 nominations at the 61st Filmfare Awards and went on to win a leading 9 awards at the ceremony, including Best Film, Best Director (Bhansali), Best Actor (Singh), and Best Supporting Actress (Chopra). It received 13 nominations at the 22nd Screen Awards, including Best Film, and Best Director (Bhansali), and won 7 including Best Actor (Singh), and Best Supporting Actress (Chopra). The film also won a leading 13 awards from a leading 18 nominations at the 17th IIFA Awards including Best Director (Bhansali), Best Actor (Singh), and Best Supporting Actress (Chopra).

== Historical inaccuracies ==
The film was adapted from the novel Rau, whose accuracy has long been questioned. Bhansali consulted historian Ninad Bedekar, who is regarded as an authority on the Peshwas. According to an article published by Quartz, the "love story" of Bajirao and Mastani is "almost entirely fictional", writing that even the most reliable sources do not give details about the nature of their relationship. There has been controversy over Mastani's true lineage; two accounts of Mastani exist – one which says she was a tawaif and Bajirao's mistress or concubine, and another that is depicted in the film.

According to historian Saili Palande-Datar, very little is known about the women of that era due to the orthodoxy; women were not given many privileges and rights, and most of the sources from that period are accounts of political battles, revenues and socio-economic records. Palande-Datar also said that there is no evidence of the way Bajirao and Mastani's political marriage became part of folklore and was later transformed into a symbolic representation of great romance. Historian Prachi Deshpande notes in her book Creative Pasts: Historical Memory and Identity in Western India, 1700–1960, that the public fascination started after their romanticisation began in the 1890s, more than 150 years after they had died, after Marathi playwrights began writing a series of nationalistic plays based on the historical figures. The first such play that portrayed them as a star crossed couple was Bajirao-Mastani (1892) by N B Kanitkar. Quartz also said the play portrayed them as star crossed lovers and others playwrights followed Kantikar, making it as familiar to Marathi audiences as that of other epic romances. By the 1930s, a number of historical novels that also added to the "myth-making" were written, fascinating another generation. The film gives a more of a personal account of Bajirao's life, which is hard to prove since it has not been covered much by the historians. Bhansali has said it was his interpretation of how Bajirao was in his home and in personal life, and there was no way to know that.

Because of this lack of information, Bhansali took liberties with historical facts and exaggerated a few things for cinematic effects. A disclaimer on the film's credits stated it does not claim to be historically accurate. The dance sequences have been widely seen as "fictional" and "out of place" in historical context. Bajirao's dance sequence in "Malhari" has been criticized, saying a chief minister such as Bajirao would never dance in public. Similarly, the "Pinga" dance sequence between Kashibai and Mastani has been deemed "inappropriate" for women of that era.

Some historians have said that apart from the inappropriateness of a woman of Kashibai's stature dancing in public, she suffered from a type of arthritis and that dancing was not physically possible for her. While some historians have claimed both women met socially only once; others have said they never met at all. Mastani was put under house arrest by Balaji while Bajirao was on military campaign, as opposed to film's depiction of Mastani's imprisonment. The film shows Bajirao and Mastani dying at the same time in different places, which did not happen in reality. Bajirao died a few days earlier than Mastani; however the cause of her death is not known. Some have claimed she died from shock; other accounts say she committed suicide. The film portrays Mastani being chained at the time of her death but she was never chained and she and Kashibai were both present at Bajirao's last rites. After the death of Mastani, Kashibai raised Mastani's son as her own, which is not shown in the film. Other inaccuracies include Mastani playing a mandola, an instrument that originated in Europe during the 19th century.

== See also ==
- List of Asian historical drama films
- List of highest-grossing Indian films
