= Barfi! (soundtrack) =

- Soundtrack cover

Soundtrack album by Pritam
- Released: 9 August 2012
- Recorded: 2012
- Genre: Feature film soundtrack
- Length: 38:52
- Language: Hindi
- Label: Sony Music India
- Producer: Pritam

Pritam chronology
Cocktail (2012)	Barfi! (2012)	Rush (2012)

Barfi! is the soundtrack album for the 2012 Hindi film of the same name. The music and original score is composed by Pritam and featured lyrics written by Swanand Kirkire, Ashish Pandit, Neelesh Misra and Sayeed Quadri. The film is directed by Anurag Basu and produced by Ronnie Screwvala and Siddharth Roy Kapur under UTV Motion Pictures, starring Ranbir Kapoor, Priyanka Chopra, and Ileana D'Cruz in the lead roles. The film marks Pritam's third collaboration with Basu after Gangster (2006) and Life in a... Metro (2007). The album was under-development, when the film was in post-production stage and was completed only by early-August 2012. All the tracks in the film expresses the feelings of Kapoor's character.

The original soundtrack consisted of ten tunes (six original songs and four alternative renditions of the tracks), also including a promotional single which was not included in the film. It was released on 9 August 2012 by the Sony Music India label and received highly positive reviews from critics and audiences. Due to its critical and commercial reception, the album was hailed by music critics as "one of the best Bollywood albums of the year and decade". It was a recipient of several awards and nominations, including two Filmfare Awards, four IIFA Awards, three Screen Awards, an Asian Film Award, a Times of India Film Award and a Producers Guild Film Award.

== Production ==
The soundtrack album consisted of ten tunes – six original songs and four alternative tunes composed for three original tracks: "Ala Barfi", "Aashiyan" and "Phir Le Aya Dil"; the versions consisted of a reprised, redux and solo rendition. The soundtrack was influenced by Brazilian Bossa nova. One of the lead actors, Priyanka Chopra was supposed to sing a track for the film, but her contract with Universal Music prevented her from taking the offer. The album consisted of minimalistic use of instruments in the songs and score (mostly cellos and violins), due to the setting and treatment of the storyline. The soundtrack was conceptualised, when the film was under post-production stage and was ready by early-August 2012. The film only featured few lip-synced songs as they are placed according to the situation and the characters: Barfi (Ranbir Kapoor) and Jhilmil (Chopra) were deaf and mute.

The titular track "Ala Barfi" is a fun-filled number which explores the theme of the film. Kapoor recommended Mohit Chauhan to sing the title track of the film, after he received praise for the singing in the A. R. Rahman-composition "Sadda Haq" for Rockstar (2011), which was a chartbuster. He further stated that "Mohit babajee (Mohit Chauhan) has sung the title song Ala Barfi and I am very happy. A singer generally doesn't get the credit for the importance he brings to the career of an actor [...] But if you look at late singers Mohd Rafi, Mukeshji and Kishore Kumar, they used to add a lot to an actor's career."

The ghazal track "Phir Le Aya Dil" consisted of three versions sung individually by Rekha Bhardwaj, Arijit Singh and Shafqat Amanat Ali, based on the moods of the characters. Manish Gaekwad of Scroll.in opined that "The songs are not categorised as happy or sad. Instead, for an age in which songs are remixed, reprised and reduxed, each of the versions has a distinctly new flavour. The ghazal blurs the line between the two polarised states of mind, finding a meeting point to coexist as one. It makes us happy and sad, both at the same time." The musical theme composed for the film, by Pritam, is inspired from the background score from the French film Amélie (2001).

== Marketing ==
The songs "Ala Barfi", "Main Kya Karoon" and "Kyon" were launched earlier prior to the official album release. On 9 August 2012, UTV Motion Pictures, the film's production company, released the audio under the exclusive license from Sony Music India. The songs were made available to streaming on the digital platforms and were released through audio CDs, few days later. In an attempt to promote the music album, the musical team led by Pritam and the cast and crew, hosted mini-concerts across India. The event that started from 31 August 2012 at Mumbai, continued to be held on Kolkata, Bangalore and Delhi during 1, 3 and 5 September.

The soundtrack album also contains a song titled "Fatafati", sung by Pritam Chakraborty, Arijit Singh and Nakash Aziz, which was not used in the film, but the song was released as a promotional single on YouTube on 10 September 2012 with a video which contains some behind-the-scenes footage and the additional vocals are sung by Ranbir Kapoor. The song also has some Bengali lyrics written by Amitabh Bhattacharya. News18-based critic had stated that the shooting of "Fatafati" reminds of the viral Tamil song "Why This Kolaveri Di".

== Track listing ==
No.	Title	Lyrics	Singer(s)	Length
1.	"Ala Barfi"	Swanand Kirkire	Mohit Chauhan	5:19
2.	"Main Kya Karoon"	Ashish Pandit	Nikhil Paul George	4:30
3.	"Phir Le Aya Dil"	Sayeed Quadri	Rekha Bhardwaj	5:05
4.	"Kyon"	Neelesh Misra	Papon, Sunidhi Chauhan	4:26
5.	"Aashiyan"	Swanand Kirkire	Shreya Ghoshal, Nikhil Paul George	3:56
6.	"Saawali Si Raat"	Swanand Kirkire	Arijit Singh	5:08
7.	"Ala Barfi" (Reprise)	Swanand Kirkire	Swanand Kirkire	5:41
8.	"Phir Le Aya Dil" (Reprise)	Sayeed Quadri	Arijit Singh	4:45
9.	"Phir Le Aya Dil" (Redux)	Sayeed Quadri	Shafqat Amanat Ali	5:03
10.	"Aashiyan" (Solo)	Swanand Kirkire	Nikhil Paul George	4:08
11.	"Fataafati"	Amitabh Bhattacharya	Arijit Singh, Nakash Aziz, Pritam Chakraborty, Ranbir Kapoor	3:46

== Release history ==
Region	Date	Format(s)	Version	Catalogue code	Label	Ref.
Worldwide	9 August 2012	Digital download; streaming	Standard	N/A	Sony Music India	
India	23 August 2012	CD	Standard	88725 47438 2	Sony Music India	
India	7 January 2013	CD	Repress	88725 47438 2	Sony Music India	
United Kingdom	17 December 2012	Vinyl	Standard	DADC000379	Sony Music India	

== Reception ==
=== Critical review ===
Barfi!'s soundtrack received positive reviews by critics. Hindustan Times-based critic rated the album 4.5 out of 5 stars and stated that "the soundtrack is a joyride sans flaws". It further wrote "Pritam has given many hits, but like his tunes in Life in a... Metro, this one will be remembered for breaking the monotony in his sound. There are no foot-tapping numbers or remixes here, but the simplicity that makes this album a winner." Joginder Tuteja of Bollywood Hungama rated the album 3.5 out of 5 stars and stated "Barfi!'s soundtrack is quite good and is easily one of the best quality creations by Pritam. He has totally reinvented himself with this album which defies Bollywood norms and boasts of a sound of its own. However the biggest challenge lies in the fact that the album has hit the stands really late in the day. What further distinguishes the album from other 'ready to serve' chartbuster scores is the fact that it carries its own distinct (and very good) sound that requires time to grow and register itself with the audience."

Indiatimes-based critic Anand Vaishnav wrote "Like Kapoor's Rockstar, Barfi too is a high-quality album. But while Rockstar's music wowed us with its complexity and layered sound, Barfi's strength lies in its subtlety and simplicity [...] And though initially, the music may come across as a bit inaccessible, in terms of its sound and flavor; every song feels like it's a part of the story." Jaspreet Pandohar, in his review for BBC, stated with a verdict: "The creative arrangements and beautiful lyrics make for a standout soundtrack which is an easy listening fit for both world cinema and music-loving audiences". Karthik Srinivasan of Milliblog said "Much like his earlier combo with Anurag Basu in Life in a Metro, Pritam delivers a whopper, again!" Vipin Nair of Music Aloud gave 9/10 to the album saying it as "the best soundtrack of Pritam, who has been in good form this year".

=== Commercial response ===
The commercial response to the album led to feature in several year-end and decade-end lists regarding the "Best Bollywood Albums". In 2017, Film Companion listed the album in the 57th position regarding the Top 100 Bollywood Albums, and also listed in the 6th position, in the 10 Best Hindi Film Albums of the Decade. Akshay Manwani of Firstpost too hailed it as one of the Best Hindi Film Albums of the Decade; calling it as a "delectable treat", he further wrote " Music composer Pritam, though, merits the biggest pat on the back as he imbues every composition in Barfi! with feeling, a quality sorely lacking in so many contemporary film albums". On the special edition released on World Music Day (21 June 2021), Devesh Sharma of Filmfare who wrote for the column, titled "World Music Day Special: Best Bollywood albums of last decade" included Barfi! as one of the list. Tatsam Mukherjee's column for Huffington Post about "Top 20 Bollywood Albums Since 2000" (ranked in non-chronological order) listed the album.

"Main Kya Karoon" was listed in the Top 10 Bollywood Songs of 2012, by The Times of India. "Ala Barfi" was listed in India Today's Chartbusters 2012, where it was featured in one among the 25 Bollywood songs. All the tracks in Barfi! were featured in the Top 100 Bollywood Songs of the Decade by Mumbai Live. "Aashiyan" and "Kyon" from the album, were listed as one among the Best of Hindi Film Music in 2012 (in #2 and #13), by Milliblog, which further included the album in the second-most position. Four of the tracks from the album were featured in Music Aloud Playback – Top 25 of 2012 in Hindi film music. The album in its entirety topped the first position in iTunes upon its release. A report from Ormax Media, had included the album along with Ae Dil Hai Mushkil and Yeh Jawaani Hai Deewani among the Top 10 Best Bollywood Albums of the decade. (Note: Both films had Ranbir Kapoor playing the leading role)

== Accolades ==
Award (Note: Awards, festivals and organisations are in alphabetical order.)	Date of ceremony (Note: Date is linked to the article about the awards held that year, wherever possible.)	Category	Recipient(s) and nominee(s)	Result	Ref.
Apsara Film & Television Producers Guild Awards (Note: Also known as Star Guild Awards.)	16 February 2013	Best Music Director	Pritam Chakraborty	Nominated	
Apsara Film & Television Producers Guild Awards	16 February 2013	Best Lyricist	Sayeed Quadri (for song "Phir Le Aya Dil")	Nominated	
Apsara Film & Television Producers Guild Awards	16 February 2013	Best Male Playback Singer	Mohit Chauhan (for song "Ala Barfi")	Nominated	
Apsara Film & Television Producers Guild Awards	16 February 2013	Best Male Playback Singer	Nikhil Paul George (for song "Main Kya Karoon")	Nominated	
Apsara Film & Television Producers Guild Awards	16 February 2013	Best Sound Mixing	Debajit Changmai	Won	
Asian Film Awards	18 March 2013	Best Composer	Pritam Chakraborty	Won	
BIG Star Entertainment Awards	31 December 2012	Most Entertaining Music	Pritam Chakraborty	Nominated	
BIG Star Entertainment Awards	31 December 2012	Most Entertaining Singer – Male	Mohit Chauhan (for song "Ala Barfi")	Nominated	
Filmfare Awards	20 January 2013	Best Music Director	Pritam Chakraborty	Won	
Filmfare Awards	20 January 2013	Best Background Score	Pritam Chakraborty	Won	
Filmfare Awards	20 January 2013	Best Lyricist	Swanand Kirkire (for song "Aashiyaan")	Nominated	
Filmfare Awards	20 January 2013	Best Male Playback Singer	Mohit Chauhan (for song "Ala Barfi")	Nominated	
Filmfare Awards	20 January 2013	Best Male Playback Singer	Nikhil Paul George (for song "Main Kya Karoon")	Nominated	
IIFA Awards	6 July 2013	Best Music Director	Pritam Chakraborty	Won	
IIFA Awards	6 July 2013	Best Lyricist	Sayeed Quadri (for song "Phir Le Aya Dil (Reprise)")	Nominated	
IIFA Awards	6 July 2013	Best Lyricist	Swanand Kirkire (for song "Aashiyan (Solo)" & "Ala Barfi")	Nominated	
IIFA Awards	6 July 2013	Best Male Playback Singer	Nikhil Paul George (for song "Main Kya Karoon" & "Aashiyan")	Nominated	
IIFA Awards	6 July 2013	Best Female Playback Singer	Rekha Bhardwaj (for song "Phir Le Aya Dil")	Nominated	
IIFA Awards	6 July 2013	Best Female Playback Singer	Shreya Ghoshal (for song "Aashiyan (Duet)")	Nominated	
IIFA Awards	6 July 2013	Best Sound Design	Shajith Koyeri	Won	
IIFA Awards	6 July 2013	Best Sound Recording	Eric Pillai	Won	
IIFA Awards	6 July 2013	Best Mixing	Debajit Changmai	Won	
IIFA Awards	6 July 2013	Best Background Score	Pritam Chakraborty	Won	
Mirchi Music Awards	7 February 2013	Album of the Year	Barfi!	Nominated	
Mirchi Music Awards	7 February 2013	Music Composer of the Year	Pritam Chakraborty (for song "Ala Barfi")	Nominated	
Mirchi Music Awards	7 February 2013	Music Composer of the Year	Pritam Chakraborty (for song "Phir Le Aya Dil")	Nominated	
Mirchi Music Awards	7 February 2013	Lyricist of the Year	Neelesh Misra (for song "Kyon")	Nominated	
Mirchi Music Awards	7 February 2013	Upcoming Male Vocalist of the Year	Nikhil Paul George (for song "Main Kya Karoon")	Nominated	
Mirchi Music Awards	7 February 2013	Upcoming Male Vocalist of the Year	Nikhil Paul George (for song "Aashiyan")	Nominated	
Mirchi Music Awards	7 February 2013	Upcoming Male Vocalist of the Year	Arijit Singh (for the song "Phir Le Aya Dil")	Nominated	
Mirchi Music Awards	7 February 2013	Technical Programmer and Arranger of the Year	Jim Satya, DJ Phukan	Nominated	
Mirchi Music Awards	7 February 2013	Technical Background Score of the Year	Pritam Chakraborty	Nominated	
Screen Awards	12 January 2013	Best Music Director	Pritam Chakraborty	Won	
Screen Awards	12 January 2013	Best Background Music	Pritam Chakraborty	Won	
Screen Awards	12 January 2013	Most Popular Music	Pritam Chakraborty	Won	
Screen Awards	12 January 2013	Best Male Playback Singer	Mohit Chauhan (for song "Ala Barfi")	Nominated	
Screen Awards	12 January 2013	Best Male Playback Singer	Nikhil Paul George (for song "Main Kya Karoon")	Nominated	
Screen Awards	12 January 2013	Best Lyricist	Swanand Kirkire (for song "Aashiyaan")	Nominated	
Screen Awards	12 January 2013	Best Story	Anurag Basu, Tani Basu	Nominated	
Screen Awards	12 January 2013	Best Screenplay	Anurag Basu, Tani Basu	Nominated	
Screen Awards	12 January 2013	Best Sound Design	Shajith Koyeri	Nominated	
Stardust Awards	26 January 2013	New Musical Sensation Singer – Male	Nikhil Paul George (for song "Main Kya Karoon")	Nominated	
Stardust Awards	26 January 2013	New Musical Sensation Singer – Male	Papon (for song "Kyon")	Nominated	
Times of India Film Awards	6 April 2013	Best Music Director	Pritam Chakraborty	Nominated	
Times of India Film Awards	6 April 2013	Best Lyricist	Swanand Kirkire (for song "Aashiyan")	Nominated	
Times of India Film Awards	6 April 2013	Best Playback Singer – Male	Mohit Chauhan (for song "Ala Barfi")	Nominated	
Times of India Film Awards	6 April 2013	Best Playback Singer – Male	Nikhil Paul George (for song "Aashiyan")	Nominated	
Times of India Film Awards	6 April 2013	Best Playback Singer – Female	Shreya Ghoshal (for song "Aashiyan")	Nominated	
Times of India Film Awards	6 April 2013	Best Background Score	Pritam Chakraborty	Won	
Zee Cine Awards	7 January 2013	Best Music Director	Pritam Chakraborty	Nominated	
Zee Cine Awards	7 January 2013	Best Lyricist	Neelesh Misra (for song "Kyon")	Nominated	
Zee Cine Awards	7 January 2013	Best Male Playback Singer	Mohit Chauhan (for song "Ala Barfi")	Nominated	
