= Bajirao Mastani (soundtrack) =

Soundtrack album by Sanjay Leela Bhansali
- Released: 31 October 2015
- Recorded: Wow & Flutter Studio, Andheri West, Mumbai
- Genre: Filmi
- Length: 41:53
- Language: Hindi
- Label: Eros Music

Sanjay Leela Bhansali chronology
Goliyon Ki Raasleela: Ram-Leela (2013)	Bajirao Mastani (2015)	Padmaavat (2018)

Singles from Bajirao Mastani
- 1. "Gajanana" Released: 23 September 2015; 2. "Deewani Mastani" Released: 21 October 2015; 3. "Pinga" Released: 16 November 2015; 4. "Mohe Rang Do Laal" Released: 25 November 2015

Bajirao Mastani is the soundtrack album, composed by Sanjay Leela Bhansali with assistance by Shreyas Puranik and Devrath to the 2015 Hindi film of the same name. The film stars Ranveer Singh, Deepika Padukone and Priyanka Chopra in lead roles. The album, originally recorded in Hindi features nine songs, and was released on 31 October 2015 by Eros Music. The original score of the film is composed by Sanchit Balhara.

The music in the film is situational and narrative in nature. The songs were conceived progressively with the development of film script that was completed in twelve years. Bhansali was inspired by the music of Mughal-e-Azam to compose the film soundtrack. The songs cover genres of Marathi folk, Sufi, lavani, qawwali and Indian classical apart from fusion of different ragas in single tracks.

Upon release, music critics anticipated in positive that the tunes will match visuals, justifying lyrical interpretations. Critics noted the album as semi-classical, emphasizing more on harmonies, melodies and rhythms. Although the background score was called thunderous and elaborate, well into the film's soundscape, it was criticised for overuse and strength.

Bhansali was nominated for the Filmfare Award for Best Music Director for his music direction. However, Shreya Ghoshal won the Filmfare Award for Best Female Playback Singer for the song "Deewani Mastani". Artistes Justin Jose and Biswadeep Chatterjee won the National Film Awards for Best Audiography, the former awarded for final re-recording, whereas the latter for sound design. The film score was nominated under Best Original Music category at the Asian Film Awards 2016.

== Development ==
Sanjay Leela Bhansali took inspiration for the songs from the film Mughal-E-Azam (1960). For the track "Albela Sajan", Bhansali has tuned Kishori Amonkar, who has sung the original track in the raag Bhoopali. The composition was blended with another raag titled Ahir Bhairav. Bhansali added that Shiv Kalyan Raja, a Marathi album by Hridaynath Mangeshkar, apart from Marathi folk and classical music were inspirations for the soundtrack of Bajirao Mastani. The track "Mohe Rang Do Laal" was composed when Bhansali was waiting at the airport after his flight got cancelled. The initial composition of "Deewani Mastani" dates to twelve years back where Bhansali conceived the track while having a shower. He adds: "That was the first time I had thought of making Bajirao Mastani as a film." The song opens with Marathi lyrics "Nabhatoon aali apsara, ashi sundara, saaz sazvuna" which translates to "A fairy has stepped down from the skies, so beautiful and all dressed up." Lyricist Prashant Ingole, on writing for the song "Gajanana" stated: "I was asked to write an aarti for Ganpati and I wanted to do something that was never done before. So I went back home and asked my mother the different names of Ganeshji, and jotted them down." The song "Gajanana" was composed by Shreyas Puranik.

Justin Jose K. was involved the key sound mixing of the soundtrack and original score. According to him, some scenes required a lot of probe into the characters and the mood. His team involved for sound mix worked for nearly 600 hours for a month and a half. They had to study the characters, the period of the film and the requirement as directed by Bhansali to set the sounds right on Dolby Atmos.

== Critical response ==
=== Songs ===
Music critic Joginder Tuteja from Bollywood Hungama gave the album 3.5 stars (out of 5) saying: "Bajirao Mastani soundtrack is on the expected lines. A heavy album with as many as 10 tracks, it is high on classical base with a few potentially popular songs in there as well. Though at least half the songs in there are primarily situational, given Sanjay Leela Bhansali's expertise when it comes to spinning around wonderful visuals, they can be expected to make a good impression on screen." Critic R. M. Vijayakar in his review for India-West gave the soundtrack a rating of 4.5 out of 5 and described the album to be a "fragrant rose". He stated: "The Maharashtrian ambiance, complete with riffs, choruses and traditional Marathi verse and excerpts, dominates "Bajirao Mastani's fascinating score, easily Sanjay Leela Bhansali's finest musical outing since "Devdas (2002)." Aelina Kapoor from Rediff.com gave the album a score of 3 out of 5, stated that, "The music of Bajirao Mastani is a roller-coaster ride. Though there isn't anything wrong about Bhansali's tunes here, there are quite a few ups and downs in the 10 songs in the soundtrack. A lot of qawwali and romance in Bajirao Mastani's soundtrack."

Suanshu Khurana from The Indian Express gave the album 3.5 stars out of 5 and stated, "In many parts, Bajirao Mastani sounds fresh, like carefully restored music from Bajirao's times. Some tracks work better than the others. Buy it for Bhansali's distinct sound and a balance between restraint and exuberance." Kasmin Fernandes of The Times of India gave the album 3.5 stars out of 5 and complimented the lyrics by Siddharth-Garima, singing by Arijit Singh, Vishal Dadlani and Shreya Ghoshal. Devesh Sharma in his critical review for Filmfare, gave the album 3 stars out of 5, stating that, "Bajirao Mastani's soundtrack isn’t for the average listener used to hook-filled masala numbers. It's an acquired taste but will definitely offer up its riches if you lower your inhibitions. Clean, harmonic music leaning towards melody and rhythm."

=== Original score ===
In his review for Bollywood Hungama, Taran Adarsh wrote: "Bhansali seamlessly weaves music in the historical. Filmed with care, the songs (also composed by Bhansali) are mesmeric and have been choreographed with precision. The ones that stand out are ''Deewani Mastani'', ''Albela Sajan'' and ''Pinga''. The background score by Sanchit Balhara is wonderful." Subhash K. Jha stated, "The songs composed by Bhansali come on very frequently never intruding on the theme of love and war but rather enhancing the theme with sumptuous supreme supplementation." Srijana Mitra Das in her review for The Times of India gave the music 3.5 out of 5. Critic Raja Sen of Rediff called the score thunderous. Namrata Joshi of The Hindu stated: "There is not a moment of silence. Even when there is, the pounding background music takes over." Ananya Bhattacharya of India Today said: "The music of the film is haunting. The background score, "Deewani Mastani" and "Aayat" are among the songs that stay with one long after the film ends." Surabhi Redkar in her review for Koimoi said, "The soulful music too compliments well except 'Pinga' which is not a delight to watch." Critic Rajeev Masand opined that the narrative is hobbled due to too many songs. In his review for NDTV, Saibal Chaterjee said: "Every emotion in the film – be it love, longing or valour on the battlefield – is translated into a grand and elaborate song-and-dance routine. A couple of the musical set pieces do not ring true in a historical epic about a man whose place in history is primarily as an unvanquished general." Suprateek Chatterjee of Huffington Post India noted: "Sanchit Balhara's background score is nicely orchestrated, but dominates the film's soundscape along with badly mixed-in battle sound FX a little too strongly."

== Marketing ==
The first single from the soundtrack album "Gajanana" was launched on 23 September 2015, at Shree Shiv Chhatrapati Sports Complex, Balewadi Stadium in Pune in the presence of film's director Sanjay Leela Bhansali, Ranveer Singh and Deepika Padukone. The second single from the film, titled "Deewani Mastani" was launched on 21 October 2015 at an event in Delhi.

After the release of soundtrack album on 31 October 2015, the third single, titled "Pinga" was scheduled to be released in a launch event on 14 November 2015, but it was cancelled due to the November 2015 Paris attacks. It was then officially released online on 15 November 2015.

The song titled "Malhari" was launched at an event in Bhopal on 29 November 2015. The song "Albela Sajan" and "Aayat" along with "Malhari" were released in that order, forming promotional singles after the soundtrack album release.

== Track listing ==
Bajirao Mastani (Original Motion Picture Soundtrack)
No.	Title	Lyrics	Music	Singer(s)	Length
1.	"Deewani Mastani"	Siddharth–Garima	Sanjay Leela Bhansali	Shreya Ghoshal, Ganesh Chandasive, Mujtaba Aziz Naza, Shadab Faridi, Altamash Faridi, Farhan Sabri	05:40
2.	"Aayat"	A. M. Turaz, Nasir Faraaz	Sanjay Leela Bhansali	Arijit Singh, Mujtaba Aziz Naza, Shadab Faridi, Altamash Faridi, Farhan Sabri	04:22
3.	"Malhari"	Prashant Ingole	Sanjay Leela Bhansali	Vishal Dadlani	04:05
4.	"Mohe Rang Do Laal"	Siddharth–Garima	Sanjay Leela Bhansali	Pandit Birju Maharaj, Shreya Ghoshal	03:52
5.	"Albela Sajan"	Siddharth–Garima	Sanjay Leela Bhansali	Shashi Suman, Kunal Pandit, Prithvi Gandharva, Kanika Joshi, Rashi Raagga & Geetikka Manjrekar	03:29
6.	"Ab Tohe Jane Na Doongi"	A. M. Turaz	Sanjay Leela Bhansali	Payal Dev, Shreyas Puranik	03:54
7.	"Pinga"	Siddharth–Garima	Sanjay Leela Bhansali	Shreya Ghoshal, Vaishali Mhade	04:16
8.	"Aaj Ibaadat (Raga Yaman Kalyan)"	A. M. Turaz	Sanjay Leela Bhansali	Javed Bashir, Shadab Faridi, Altamash Faridi	04:45
9.	"Fitoori"	Prashant Ingole	Sanjay Leela Bhansali	Vaishali Mhade, Ganesh Chandanshive	03:56
10.	"Gajanana"	Prashant Ingole	Shreyas Puranik	Sukhwinder Singh	03:34
Total length:					41:53

== Music charts ==
At the end of 2015, the music from the soundtrack garnered positive reviews from critics. Sankhayan Ghosh of The Hindu wrote: "There are few filmmakers as musical as Sanjay Leela Bhansali, who took one step forward in taking full control over his ambitious audiovisual canvas in Bajirao Mastani. While the powerful 'Gajanana' amplified a crucial sequence to a great extent, it was the left-out-from-album Bajirao theme, the war cry-like chant 'Ji Ji Re Baji Ji Ji', that gives the film an electrifying energy. The album favourites included ‘Deewani Mastani’, 'Ab Toh Jaane Na Doongi', ‘Mohe Rang Do Laal’ and 'Aaj Ibadat'. Whereas Karthik Srinivasan for the same newspaper opined, "Sanjay Leela Bhansali finally got his musical tuning right in Bajirao Mastani". At the Scroll.in news, the soundtrack album was tied atop (to the soundtrack of Tamasha), Manish Gaekwad stated: "Bajirao Mastani as one of the top five scores of the year. The music, by writer and director Sanjay Leela Bhansali, combines its unique blend of sounds with its theme. "Deewani Mastani" fuses elements of Marathi folk with Sufi, establishing its character's exposure to both forms. The war cry "Malhari" and the devotional "Gajanana" are weapons in Bajirao's armour. The album also meshes semi-classical with qawwali in "Aayat", while "Mohe Rang Do Laal" has Pandit Birju Maharaj interspersing Shreya Ghoshal's vocals with Kathak bols (mnemonic syllables). "Albela Sajan" from Hum Dil De Chuke Sanam (1999), gets a makeover with a sitar and chorus interlude. "Pinga" and "Fitoori" incorporate a lavani tempo with Bollywood trimmings to produce a fantastic melange." In her compilation for Hindustan Times, Juhi Chakraborty mentions: "The classical number "Albela Sajan" has been revisited many times over the years and Bhansali, who used the track in his superhit Hum Dil De Chuke Sanam, brought out another version of the song - this time for his period love saga Bajirao Mastani. While the Hum Dil De Chuke Sanam track was more soft, this one is more cheerful and a number of singers."

== Album credits ==
Credits adapted from CD liner notes of the soundtrack album.

All soundtrack album music composed by Sanjay Leela Bhansali, except track "Gajanana" composed by Shreyas Puranik.

Recording, mixing and mastering – Tanay Gajjar

=== Backing vocals ===
Credits for backing vocals adapted from metadata of the album at the iTunes.

- Shadab Faridi, Altamash Faridi, Farhan Sabri (for the track "Deewani Mastani")
- Mujtaba Aziz Naza, Shadab Faridi, Altamash Faridi, Farhan Sabri (for the track "Aayat")
- Shadab Faridi, Altamash Faridi, Shashi Suman, Shreyas Puranik (for the track "Aaj Ibaadat")
- Aishwarya Bhandari, Geetikka Manjrekar, Kanika Joshi, Mayur Sakhare, Shreyas Puranik, Maneesh Singh, Vivek Naik, Devendra Chitnis (for the track "Fitoori")

=== Lyrics ===
- Prashant INGOLE - (Malhari)
- Nasir Faraaz – Qawwali on the track "Deewani Mastani"
- Ganesh Chandanshive – Marathi lyrics on the track "Deewani Mastani"

=== Music arrangement and programming ===
- Shail-Pritesh (for the tracks – "Deewani Mastani", "Aayat" and "Mohe Rang Do Laal")
- Jackie Vanjari (for the tracks – "Malhari", "Pinga" and "Fitoori")
- Tubby-Parik (for the tracks – "Mohe Rang Do Laal", "Aaj Ibaadat")
- Aditya Dev (for the track "Albela Sajan")
- Abhijit Vaghani (for the track "Ab Tohe Jaane Na Dungi")

=== Rhythms ===
- Nitin Shankar (for the track "Deewani Mastani")

== See also ==
- List of accolades received by Bajirao Mastani
