= Laal Singh Chaddha (soundtrack) =

Laal Singh Chaddha (Original Motion Picture Soundtrack)

Soundtrack album by Pritam
- Released: 5 August 2022
- Recorded: 2019–2022
- Genre: Feature film soundtrack
- Length: 54:22
- Language: Hindi
- Label: T-Series

Pritam chronology
Bhool Bhulaiyaa 2 (2022)	Laal Singh Chaddha (Original Motion Picture Soundtrack) (2022)	Brahmāstra: Part One – Shiva (2022)
External audio
- Audio Jukebox on YouTube

Laal Singh Chaddha (Original Motion Picture Soundtrack) is the soundtrack album to the 2022 film of the same name directed by Advait Chandan and produced by Aamir Khan Productions, Viacom18 Studios and Paramount Pictures. An adaptation of Forrest Gump (1994), which itself is based on the eponymous novel published in 1986 by author Winston Groom, the film starred Aamir Khan and Kareena Kapoor Khan. The soundtrack to the film consisted of six songs composed by Pritam with lyrics written by Amitabh Bhattacharya and released under the T-Series label on 5 August 2022. The music was positively received with Pritam being nominated for the Filmfare Award for Best Music Director, which he won for Brahmāstra: Part One – Shiva. However, the album won the Mirchi Music Award for Album of The Year.

== Development ==
On August 2019, it was announced that Pritam would compose the music for Laal Singh Chaddha, thereby collaborating with Khan for the third time after Dhoom 3 (2013) and Dangal (2016). Soon after his involvement, the music sitting discussions were held during the same period at Khan's Panchagni House with Pritam and Bhattacharya curating the tunes. They curated five original songs specifically for the film which was produced during 2019–2022.

The album also had another version of the title track, and over multiple versions of the tunes which moves away from Laal's character. Pritam, in an interview, to Devarsi Ghosh of Scroll.in stated that he had over thousands of versions that "are more audio-friendly than film-friendly. Aamir says he wants to release them during the film’s OTT release." Tanuj Tiku composed the film score.

== Composition ==
The first song is the title track "Kahani", which was featured in the motion poster. It was recorded by Mohan Kannan, lead vocalist of the band Agnee, in January 2020. Kannan revealed on the brief he got from Pritam and Bhattacharya where the latter insisted him to focus on the lyrics as it captures the film's philosophy and the idea was to connect with the character. The second antara of the song encapsulated the film's story. Kannan praised Bhattacharya's lyrics which was "beautifully written with simple, everyday language". Another version of the song was sung by Sonu Nigam, that appears later in the film. "Main Ki Karaan" is the second song of the film that explores the relationship between Laal and Rupa during their childhood. Nigam recorded the vocals for the song within five hours, describing it as "very beautiful" and "wonderfully written". Despite having a fallout with Pritam, after one of the songs which he was intended to record for, was replaced by another singer, he eventually recorded the vocals for it after Pritam assured Khan on Nigam's vocals being felt apt for it. "Phir Na Aisi Raat Aayegi" is the third song from the film that is picturized on Laal and Rupa's relationship, sung by Arijit Singh. It was described as an "old-fashioned number" by Khan.

"In Forrest Gump, when he runs, there is no one song to underline what Forrest is thinking, just as the whole film doesn’t have songs to constantly tell us what’s on his mind [...] Here, the question is, why is Laal running. Is he heartbroken? Is he running to get over Rupa? The audience has to be given a reason."

— Pritam on composing the song "Tur Kalleyan", in an interview of Scroll.in

"Tur Kalleyan" is featured in the sequence where Laal goes on a cross-country marathon after Rupa disappears from his life. The song was shot for six weeks across multiple locations in India. For the specific scene, he had shortlisted 7–8 songs for the film before finalising "Tur Kalleyan". But he was concerned on the lyrics, where it should be written in Laal's or the third person's perspective. While Khan had felt the lyrics had matched the closest to the situation, but disliked its "bouncy, happy tune". This led to Pritam slowing down and re-orchestrate the track to match the visuals. As per Khan's suggestion, he included an aalap from Laal's perspective in the beginning, which served as a prelude for the track and was recorded by Singh. It then transitions into a qawwali-like number with Shadaab Faridi and Altamash Faridi providing the vocals.

"Tere Hawale" is the final song featured in the film. Initially, the song did not have a female singer with Pritam composing the tune in a "male key" and Bhattacharya writing it from Laal's perspective, as he marries Rupa. He wanted to make the song sound like a gurbani, after watching videos of Punjabi marriages. Deciphered it as Pritam's favourite composition for the film, he composed an earlier version that had a "lush orchestration" and Singh's "ornate vocals". But Khan insisted the song to be stripped down and wanted Singh to sing flatly, keeping in mind with Laal's character. Since, the tune was never composed for a woman, Pritam insisted Shilpa Rao to record it in a lower octave. The reworking of the song led him to delay the film's release.

== Marketing and release ==
On 28 April 2022, four months prior to the film's release, the first song "Kahani" was released as an audio-only format in music streaming platforms. Prior to its release, Khan teased on his social-media platforms on revealing the title "kahani" (transl. story) though the title was not finalized, according to Kannan. Afterwards, Khan went to a radio station to reveal the song through FM. On 12 May, the song "Main Ki Karaan?" was released in a lyrical video format. The song was described by the makers as an "ode to first love". The song "Phir Na Aisi Raat Aayegi" was released on 24 June 2022. Music videos for those songs were released closer to the film's release.

"Tur Kalleyan" was released with on 15 July 2022, while an accompanying music video released ten days later. Sonu Nigam's version of "Kahani" was released on 18 July. The song had its accompanying music video released on the same day that showcased the timeline of Laal's journey from his childhood to adulthood. The song "Tere Hawaale" was released on 4 August 2022.

The full album was released by T-Series on 5 August 2022, featuring six tracks. An extended album featuring five additional tracks was released on 12 April 2023.

== Reception ==
The soundtrack received positive reviews from critics, with The Times of India describing it as "the best music album of the year". Vipin Nair of Music Aloud wrote "The last time Pritam and Amitabh Bhattacharya came together for an Aamir Khan movie, they produced the brilliant Dangal. Six years later, we have another musical gem on our hands in Laal Singh Chaddha!" Anish Mohanty of Planet Bollywood rated 3.5 out of 5 and wrote "The music of ‘Laal Singh Chaddha’ towers above the soundtrack of all the films Aamir and Pritam have done together. Innocence and an old-world charm are the two things that are common to all the songs on the album." Lakshmi Govindarajan Javeri of News9live called "Pritam has created a masterpiece."

Nandini Ramnath of Scroll.in complimented Pritam's "lovely score" and Bhattacharya's "lullaby-like lyrics" enhanced the narrative. Rahul Desai of Film Companion wrote "Pritam's soundtrack sways between nursery-rhyme simplicity and brooding ballads, reflecting the black-or-white emotions of the protagonist." Vijeth Balila of Deccan Herald wrote "Two songs from the film’s album, ‘Kahani’ and ‘Tur Kalleya’, written by Amitabh Bhattacharya and composed by Pritam, carry in them the whole essence of the film. They truly amplify the film to its desired ends."

Tridip K. Mandal of The Quint was critical of the album, calling it "the regular Pritam stuff" and not as iconic as the soundtrack of Forrest Gump. He also mentioned that the album had the hangover of Barfi! (2012). Anuj Kumar of The Hindu wrote "Pritam’s music isn’t bad, but doesn’t provide the much-needed local flavour to the narrative."

Sonu Nigam, in an interview with Bollywood Hungama, stated that his songs for the film "would have reached the level of Kal Ho Naa Ho" if the film was not plagued with negativity.

== Track listing ==
All lyrics are written by Amitabh Bhattacharya.

Original track listing
No.	Title	Singer(s)	Length
1.	"Kahani"	Mohan Kannan	3:28
2.	"Main Ki Karaan?"	Sonu Nigam, Romy	4:14
3.	"Phir Na Aisi Raat Aayegi"	Arijit Singh	4:43
4.	"Tur Kalleyan"	Arijit Singh, Shadaab Faridi, Altamash Faridi	5:38
5.	"Kahani" (Sonu's Version)	Sonu Nigam	4:58
6.	"Tere Hawaale"	Arijit Singh, Shilpa Rao	5:46
Total length:			28:48

Extended edition track listing
No.	Title	Singer(s)	Length
7.	"Kahani" (Mohit Chauhan's Version)	Mohit Chauhan	4:01
8.	"Tere Hawaale" (Arijit Shreya Duet)	Arijit Singh, Shreya Ghoshal	5:48
9.	"Phir Na Aisi Raat Aayegi" (Film Version)	Arijit Singh	4:43
10.	"Tur Kalleyan" (Nooran Sisters Version)	Nooran Sisters	5:06
11.	"Tere Hawaale" (Tushar Shilpa Duet)	Tushar Joshi, Shilpa Rao	5:57
Total length:			54:22

== Album credits ==
Credits adapted from T-Series:

- Composer – Pritam
- Music arrangement and production – Sunny M.R., Jim Satya, Stefan Mathew, DJ Phukan, Anurag Saikia, Zafar Ansari, Himonshu Parikh
- Sound design – DJ Phukan, Sunny M.R., Ashwin Kulkarni
- Mixing and mastering – Shadab Rayeen (New Edge Studios), Eric Pillai (Future Sound of Bombay)
- Chief engineer and Shootmix – Ashwin Kulkarni
- Music production manager – Anurag Sharma
- Sound engineers – Ashwin Kulkarni, Aniruddh Anantha, Pranav Gupta, Sukanto Singha, Harjot Kaur, Vijay Dayal, Chinmay Mestry (YRF Studios)
- Vocal conductors – Akashdeep Sengupta, Dev Arijit, Aniruddh Anantha
- Mixing assistants – Pukhraj Sonkar, Anup Kumar, Michael Edwin Pillai
- Music production assistant – Shirish Prakash Singh

Musicians

- Accordion – Satyajit Prabhu
- Bass – Roland Fernandes, Pranab Das, Rajkumar Dewan
- Backing vocals – Anurag Saikia, Tushar Joshi, Shubham Shirule, Ana Rehman, Himonshu Parikh
- Clarinet – Shirish Malhotra
- Choir – Sonu's Choir
  - Performers – Joy Baker, Reagan Bunce, Tetra Cierpke, Timbre Cierpke, Sadie Dunn, Emily Hinkle, Rachel Stoltz, Danielle Taylor
  - Chorus arrangement – Nikhil Paul George, Timbre Cierpke
  - Chorus conductor – Timbre Cierpke
- Ethnic stringed instruments – Tapas Roy
- Guitar – Ishaan Das, Warren Mendonsa, Krishna Pradhan
- Keys – Tanuj Tiku
- Live instruments conducting – DJ Phukan and Anurag Saikia
- Orchestra – Budapest Film Orchestra
  - Lead orchestrator and session conductor – Daryl Griffith
  - Orchestrator – James Yan
  - Score editor – Wes Hicks
  - Orchestra recording engineers – Péter Barabás, Gergő Láposi (Tom Tom Láng Studio, Budapest)
  - Orchestra contractors – Kriszti Lőkös, Réka Lőkös, Csaba Lökös (CLMusic)
  - Orchestral production – Maestro Music UK
- Piano – Daryl Griffith
- Piano recording – Tamás Dragon (Pannónia Studio, Budapest)
- Tabla – Akshay Jadhav
- Whistle – Shubham Shirule

== Accolades ==
Accolades for Laal Singh Chaddha (Original Motion Picture Soundtrack)
Award	Date of the ceremony	Category	Recipients	Result	Ref.
Filmfare Awards	27 April 2023	Best Music Director	Pritam	Nominated	
Filmfare Awards	27 April 2023	Best Lyricist	Amitabh Bhattacharya – ("Tere Hawaale")	Nominated	
Filmfare Awards	27 April 2023	Best Male Playback Singer	Sonu Nigam – ("Main Ki Karaan?")	Nominated	
Filmfare Awards	27 April 2023	Best Female Playback Singer	Shilpa Rao – ("Tere Hawaale")	Nominated	
Mirchi Music Awards	3 November 2023	Album of The Year	—	Won	
Mirchi Music Awards	3 November 2023	Album of The Year (Listeners' Choice)	—	Nominated	
Mirchi Music Awards	3 November 2023	Male Vocalist of The Year	Arijit Singh – ("Tur Kalleyan")	Nominated	
Mirchi Music Awards	3 November 2023	Male Vocalist of The Year	Arijit Singh – ("Phir Na Aisi Raat Aayegi")	Nominated	
Mirchi Music Awards	3 November 2023	Male Vocalist of The Year	Mohan Kannan – ("Kahani")	Nominated	
Mirchi Music Awards	3 November 2023	Lyricist of The Year	Amitabh Bhattacharya – ("Tur Kalleyan")	Won	
Mirchi Music Awards	3 November 2023	Best Song Engineer (Recording & Mixing)	Aniruddh Anantha, Ashwin Kulkarni, Harjot Kaur, Pranav Gupta, Sukanto Singha, Eric Pillai – ("Phir Na Aisi Raat Aayegi")	Nominated	
Mirchi Music Awards	3 November 2023	Best Background Score	Tanuj Tiku	Nominated	
