= 8th Mirchi Music Awards =

Annual Hindi music award ceremony held in 2016

- Sponsored by: Royal Stag
- Date: February 29, 2016
- Location: Yash Raj Studios, Mumbai
- Country: India
- Presented by: Radio Mirchi
- Hosted by: Sonu Nigam

Highlights
- Most awards: Bajirao Mastani (7)
- Most nominations: Bajirao Mastani (19)
- Song of the Year: "Gerua" - Dilwale
- Album of the Year: Bajirao Mastani
- Website: Music Mirchi Awards 2015

Television/radio coverage
- Network: Zee TV

The 8th Mirchi Music Awards, presented by the Radio Mirchi, honoured the best of Hindi music from the year 2015. The ceremony was held on 29 February 2016 at the Yash Raj Studios, Mumbai and was hosted by Sonu Nigam. There were many performances, including those by Mika Singh, Yo Yo Honey Singh, Amaal Mallik, Palak Muchhal and Badshah. Bajirao Mastani won a leading seven awards including Album of the Year. Song of the Year went to "Gerua" from Dilwale. The show was broadcast on 13 March 2016 on Zee TV.

== Winners and nominees ==
The winners were selected by the members of jury, chaired by Javed Akhtar. The following are the names of nominees and winners.

(Winners are listed first, highlighted in boldface.)

=== Film awards ===
Song of the Year	Album of the Year
**"Gerua"** - **Dilwale**; "Chunar" - ABCD 2; "Deewani Mastani" - Bajirao Mastani; "Sooraj Dooba Hain" - Roy; "Agar Tum Saath Ho" - Tamasha	**"Bajirao Mastani"** - **Sanjay Leela Bhansali, Shreyas Puranik, Siddharth–Garima, Ganesh Chandanshive, A. M. Turaz, Nasir Faraaz, Prashant Ingole**; "ABCD 2" - Sachin–Jigar, Mayur Puri, Priya Saraiya; "Badlapur" - Sachin–Jigar, Dinesh Vijan, Priya Saraiya; "Dil Dhadakne Do" - Shankar–Ehsaan–Loy, Javed Akhtar; "Roy" - Amaal Mallik, Ankit Tiwari, Meet Bros Anjjan, Kumaar, Abhendra Kumar Upadhyay, Sandeep Nath
Male Vocalist of the Year	Female Vocalist of the Year
**Papon - "Moh Moh Ke Dhaage"** from **Dum Laga Ke Haisha**; Arijit Singh - "Chunar" from ABCD 2; Arijit Singh - "Aayat" from Bajirao Mastani; Arijit Singh - "Gerua" from Dilwale; Arijit Singh - "Sooraj Dooba Hain" from Roy	**Shreya Ghoshal - "Mohe Rang Do Laal"** from **Bajirao Mastani**; Alka Yagnik - "Agar Tum Saath Ho" from Tamasha; Monali Thakur - "Moh Moh Ke Dhaage" from Dum Laga Ke Haisha; Shreya Ghoshal - "Deewani Mastani" from Bajirao Mastani; Shreya Ghoshal and Vaishali Made - "Pinga" from Bajirao Mastani; Swati Sharma - "Banno" from Tanu Weds Manu Returns
Music Composer of the Year	Lyricist of the Year
**Pritam - "Gerua"** from **Dilwale**; Amaal Mallik - "Sooraj Dooba Hain" from Roy; Sachin–Jigar - "Chunar" from ABCD 2; Sanjay Leela Bhansali - "Aayat" from Bajirao Mastani; Sanjay Leela Bhansali - "Deewani Mastani" from Bajirao Mastani	**Varun Grover - "Moh Moh Ke Dhaage" from Dum Laga Ke Haisha**; Irshad Kamil - "Agar Tum Saath Ho" from Tamasha; Javed Akhtar - "Phir Bhi Yeh Zindagi" from Dil Dhadakne Do; Mayur Puri - "Chunar" from ABCD 2; Siddharth-Garima, Nasir Faraaz and Ganesh Chandanshive - "Deewani Mastani" from Bajirao Mastani
Upcoming Male Vocalist of the Year	Upcoming Female Vocalist of the Year
**Jubin Nautiyal - "Zindagi Kuch Toh Bata (Reprise)"** from **Bajrangi Bhaijaan**; Amaal Mallik - "O Khuda" from Hero; Ami Mishra - "Hasi" from Hamari Adhuri Kahani; Amit Mishra - "Manma Emotion Jaage" from Dilwale; Brijesh Shandilya - "Banno" from Tanu Weds Manu Returns; Zeeshan Ahmed - "Wajah Tum Ho" from Hate Story 3	**Payal Dev - "Ab Tohe Jane Na Doongi" from** Bajirao Mastani; Shraddha Kapoor - "Bezubaan Phir Se (Unplugged)" from ABCD 2; Sukriti Kakar - "Pehli Baar" from Dil Dhadakne Do; Swati Sharma - "Banno" from Tanu Weds Manu Returns; Vaishali Made - "Pinga" from Bajirao Mastani
Upcoming Music Composer of The Year	Upcoming Lyricist of The Year
**Amaal Mallik - "Sooraj Dooba Hain"** from **Roy**; Amaal Mallik - "Main Hoon Hero Tera (Salman Khan Version)" from Hero; Ami Mishra - "Hasi (Male)" from Hamari Adhuri Kahani; Shreyas Puranik - "Gajanana" from Bajirao Mastani; Tanishk Bagchi and Vayu - "Banno" from Tanu Weds Manu: Returns	**Abhendra Kumar Upadhyay - "Tu Hai Ki Nahi"** from **Roy**; Abhendra Kumar Upadhyay - "Boond Boond" from Roy; Kunaal Vermaa - "Hasi (Male)" from Hamari Adhuri Kahani; Neeraj Rajawat - "Maati Ka Palang" from NH10; Vayu - "Banno" from Tanu Weds Manu: Returns
Raag-Inspired Song of the Year
**"Albela Sajan Aayo Re"** - **Bajirao Mastani**; "Aaj Ibaadat" - Bajirao Mastani; "Mohe Rang Do Laal" - Bajirao Mastani; "Achchi Surat Pe Ghazab" - Jaanisaar; "Teri Katili Nigahon Ne" - Jaanisaar

=== Technical awards ===
Best Song Producer (Programming & Arranging)	Best Song Engineer (Recording & Mixing)
**Shail-Pritesh - "Deewani Mastani"** from **Bajirao Mastani**; Sachin–Jigar - "Jee Karda" from Badlapur; Roop Mahanta, Dj Phukan, Sunny M.R. and Nikhil Paul George - "Selfie Le Le Re" from Bajrangi Bhaijaan; Sovon Mukherjee and Amit Trivedi - "Dhadaam Dhadaam" from Bombay Velvet; Bharat Goel - "Chhil Gaye Naina" from NH10	**Tanay Gajjar - "Deewani Mastani"** from **Bajirao Mastani**; Eric Pillai - "Sun Saathiya" from ABCD 2; Tanay Gajjar - "Aayat" from Bajirao Mastani; Ashwin Kulkarni, Kaushik Das, Nikhil Paul George, Julian Mascarenhas, Emon Goswami, Milena Dobreva and Eric Pillai - "Gerua" from Dilwale; Pankaj Borah and Eric Pillai - "Khamoshiyan" from Khamoshiyan
Best Background Score
**Sanchit Balhara - Bajirao Mastani**; Anupam Roy - Piku; Sachin–Jigar - ABCD 2; Sanjoy Chowdhury - Baby; Shankar–Ehsaan–Loy and Jim Satya - Dil Dhadakne Do

=== Non-film awards ===
Indie Pop Song of the Year
- **"Main Rahoon Ya Na Rahoon"** sung by **Armaan Malik**
  - "Morey Piya" sung by Padma Wadkar
  - "Khalipan" sung by Salim Merchant
  - "Teriyaan Tu Jaane" sung by Amit Trivedi, Harshdeep Kaur, Jyoti Nooran
  - "Chal Wahan Jaate Hain" sung by Arijit Singh

=== Special awards ===
Lifetime Achievement Award	Rajesh Roshan
Royal Stag Make It Large Award	Sanjay Leela Bhansali
Face of Dhamaakedar Bollywood Hits	Govinda

=== Listeners' Choice awards ===
Listeners' Choice Song of the Year	"Agar Tum Saath Ho" - Tamasha
Listeners' Choice Album of the Year	Roy

=== Jury awards ===
Outstanding Contribution to Hindi Film Music	Yogesh
Best Album of Golden Era (1955)	Shree 420
Special Salute	Madhur Bhandarkar, Sameer Anjaan and Udit Narayan

=== Films with multiple wins and nominations ===
Films that received multiple nominations
Nominations	Film
19	Bajirao Mastani
8	ABCD 2
7	Roy
5	Dilwale
5	Tanu Weds Manu Returns
4	Dil Dhadakne Do
3	Dum Laga Ke Haisha
3	Hamari Adhuri Kahani
3	Tamasha
2	Badlapur
2	Bajrangi Bhaijaan
2	Hero
2	NH10
2	Jaanisaar

Films that received multiple awards
Wins	Film
7	Bajirao Mastani
3	Roy‡
2	Dilwale
2	Dum Laga Ke Haisha

‡ Won a Listeners' Choice award

== Jury ==
The jury was chaired by Javed Akhtar. Other members were:

- Alka Yagnik - playback singer
- Milind Srivastava - music director
- Anu Malik - music director
- Anuradha Paudwal - playback singer
- Bappi Lahiri - composer, singer
- Hariharan - singer
- Ila Arun - actress and folk singer
- Irshad Kamil - lyricist
- Lalit Pandit - composer
- Kavita Krishnamurthy - playback singer
- Louis Banks - composer, record producer and singer
- Madhur Bhandarkar - director, writer and producer
- Pankaj Udhas - singer
- Prasoon Joshi - lyricist and screenwriter
- Pritam - music director and composer
- Ramesh Sippy - director and producer
- Roop Kumar Rathod - playback singer and music director
- Sadhana Sargam - playback singer
- Sulemaan - composer
- Sameer - lyricist
- Sapna Mukherjee - playback singer
- Shaan - playback singer
- Shailendra Singh - playback singer
- Shankar Mahadevan - composer and playback singer
- Subhash Ghai - director, producer and screenwriter
- Sudhir Mishra - director and screenwriter
- Suresh Wadkar - playback singer
- Talat Aziz - singer
- Udit Narayan - playback singer
- Vijay Krishna Acharya - director and screenwriter

== See also ==
- Mirchi Music Awards
