= Gerua =

2015 Hindi song

Song by Pritam feat. Arijit Singh, Antara Mitra
- Language: Hindi
- Label: Sony Music India
- Composer: Pritam Chakraborty
- Lyricist: Amitabh Bhattacharya.

Music video
- "Gerua" on YouTube

Gerua (/ɡeɪˈruwɑː/ transl. Ochre) is a Hindi song from the 2015 Indian film Dilwale. The song was written by Amitabh Bhattacharya, composed by Pritam Chakraborty, and sung by Arijit Singh and Antara Mitra. The song's music video stars Shah Rukh Khan and Kajol. The song has over 676 million views on YouTube and is on the list of most expensive music videos in the world.

== Background ==
In an interview, the composer of the song Pritam said that he had sleepless nights when he was informed that Kajol had been paired opposite Shah Rukh Khan in the film, since it was a very tough task to create music that could recreate the magic of this iconic Bollywood pair.

== Music video ==
The music video of the song was shot in Iceland. The song's visuals are filled with scenery of lush green mountains tops, waterfalls, a rainbow, a glacial lagoon and a wrecked plane at a deserted spot.

The entertainment portals praised Rohit Shetty's cinematography and direction of the music video, they wrote "Rohit has done an amazing job of capturing the elusive beauty and thats the reason behind why this song is different from any other song. Shah Rukh and Kajol have mesmerizing and super hot chemistry. They have created the same magic which was done in Suraj Hua Madham. Rohit Shetty has given a real treat to eyes and we are quite sure audiences will fall in love with the mesmerizing beauty of Iceland."

== Song credits ==
The musicians involved in making the song, as per the credits mentioned in the official music video's description, were

- Music producers – Dj Phukan, Sunny M.R.
- Music Arrangement and programming – Arijit Singh, Prasad Sashte, Nikhil Paul George
- Mixing engineer and mastering engineer – Eric Pillai
- Musicians – Shirish Malhotra, Girish Vishwa, Iqbal Azad, Ishtiyak Khan, Prabhakar More, Krishna Pandurang Musale, Tapas Roy, Iqbal, Langa Zakir Langa, P.M.K. Naveen Kumar, Tushar Parte, Sanjoy Das, Dipesh Verma, Raj Kumar Dewan, Mahendra Kumar, Aditya Benia, Ensemble Strandja ('Dinyu, Valyu, Stoiko, Nikolai), Emilia Amper, Pete Whitefield

== Release ==
The song was officially launched on 18 November 2015.

== Reception ==
In its review, Indicine wrote, "It's a case of 'love at first listen' with 'Gerua', courtesy a soothing composition filled with a traditional setting (except for the opening 20 seconds that are misfit and strange). The flute in the beginning takes your heart away while Arijit, who has perfected the art of rendering romantic numbers, only ends up raising the bar with 'Gerua'. We bet this one will stay in your playlist for long."

Upon its release, the music video of the song garnered 1.6 million views on Facebook and YouTube. The song trended on 62 countries worldwide. The composer of the song Pritam said- "The reaction on Gerua from everywhere is very heartwarming".

In June 2016, "Gerua" became the first Hindi film song to cross 100 million views on YouTube and remained the highest viewed Bollywood song for a while.

== Awards and nominations ==
Year	Award Ceremony	Category	Recipient	Result	Reference(s)
2015	Mirchi Music Awards	Song of the Year	–	Won	
2015	Mirchi Music Awards	Male Vocalist of the Year	Arijit Singh	Nominated	
2015	Mirchi Music Awards	Music Composer of the Year	Pritam	Won	
2015	Mirchi Music Awards	Best Song Engineer (Recording & Mixing)	Ashwin Kulkarni, Kaushik Das, Nikhil Paul George, Julian Mascarenhas, Emon Goswami, Milena Dobreva & Eric Pillai	Nominated	
