= Mohe Rang Do Laal =

Song by Shreya Ghoshal and Pandit Birju Maharaj

from the album Bajirao Mastani (soundtrack)
- Language: Hindi
- Released: 24 November 2015
- Recorded: Wow & Flutter Studio, Mumbai
- Genre: Hindustani Classical, Sugam, Filmi
- Length: 3:52
- Label: Eros Now
- Composer: Sanjay Leela Bhansali
- Lyricist: Siddharth-Garima
- Producer: Sanjay Leela Bhansali

Bajirao Mastani (soundtrack) track listing
- 1. "Deewani Mastani"; 2. "Aayat"; 3. "Malhari"; 4. "Mohe Rang Do Laal"; 5. "Albela Sajan"; 6. "Ab Tohe Jane Na Doongi"; 7. "Pinga"; 8. "Aaj Ibaadat"; 9. "Fitoori"; 10. "Gajanana"

Music video
- "Mohe Rang Do Laal" on YouTube

"Mohe Rang Do Laal" (Hindi: मोहे रंग दो लाल) is a song from the 2015 Hindi film, Bajirao Mastani. It was composed by Sanjay Leela Bhansali and sung by Shreya Ghoshal and Pandit Birju Maharaj. The lyrics were written by Siddharth-Garima. The song features Deepika Padukone and Ranveer Singh in the video. Padukone took Kathak dance lessons from Pandit Birju Maharaj, who also choreographed the song. The movie was dubbed into Tamil and Telugu and hence the song was also released as "Podhai Nirathai Thaa" in Tamil and "Meera Chittachora" in Telugu on 15 December 2015. Shreya Ghoshal and Pandit Birju Maharaj sang in all the three versions of the song. The song was reprised in MTV Unplugged season 6 and was also sung by Ghoshal.

== Accolades ==
Year	Award	Nominee	Category	Result
2016	Filmfare Awards	Pandit Birju Maharaj	Best Choreography	Won
2016	GiMA Awards	Shreya Ghoshal	Best Female Playback Singer	Nominated
2015	Mirchi Music Awards	Shreya Ghoshal	Female Vocalist of the Year	Won
2015	Mirchi Music Awards	Sanjay Leela Bhansali, Siddharth–Garima	Best Raag Inspired Song	Nominated
2016	Times of India Film Awards	Shreya Ghoshal	Best Female Playback Singer	Won
2016	Zee Cine Awards	Shreya Ghoshal	Best Female Playback Singer	Won
2016	Zee Cine Awards	Pandit Birju Maharaj	Best Choreography	Nominated
2016	Zee Cine Awards	Siddharth-Garima	Best Lyricist	Nominated
