= Khufiya (soundtrack) =

2023 soundtrack album by Vishal Bhardwaj

Khufiya (Original Motion Picture Soundtrack)

Soundtrack album by Vishal Bhardwaj
- Released: 7 September 2023
- Studio: Satya Studio, Mumbai; Studio208, Mumbai; The Pierce Room, London; Abbey Road, London
- Genre: Feature film soundtrack
- Length: 35:36
- Language: Hindi
- Label: VB Music
- Producer: Nyzel D'Lima; Debarpito Saha

Vishal Bhardwaj chronology
Charlie Chopra & the Mystery of Solang Valley (2023)	Khufiya (Original Motion Picture Soundtrack) (2023)	O'Romeo (2026)

Khufiya (Original Motion Picture Soundtrack) is the soundtrack album to the 2023 film of the same name directed by Vishal Bhardwaj, who also composed the film's music and score. The album featured nine tracks with lyrics written by Gulzar, Bhardwaj and adaptations from yesteryear Sufi musicians. The album was released through VB Music on 7 September 2023 at a music launch event held in Mumbai, to positive response from music critics.

== Development ==
Vishal Bhardwaj composed the film's music, as he did for all of his directorial ventures and associated with his norm lyricist Gulzar to write most of the tracks, except for "Mat Aana" written by Bhardwaj himself. As the subject being intense and mature, Bhardwaj wanted to bring in the music in an authentic way. The spiritual guru Yāra Baba (played by Rahul Ram) performs Sufi songs by Abdul Rahim Khan-i-Khanan ("Bujhee Bujhee") and Kabir ("Mann Na Rangaave") with an electronic band, which was much different from the stereotypical portrayals of godmen in Hindi cinema.

The ghazal song "Mat Aana" performed by Rekha Bhardwaj and Niladri Kumar is signified for Tabu's character that connects with Gabbi's character, as the former was reminiscent of her past love. The song "Dil Dushman" has two versions, sung by Arijit Singh and Sunidhi Chauhan, respectively. Describing the song as the film's backbone, he recorded two versions, alternating the change in both energetic and emotionally. Arijit was chosen for a "powerful" voice, while Sunidhi was brought for the female version, as he wanted it to be "haunting and melodious". He referenced the James Bond theme from No Time to Die (2021) while composing.

Bhardwaj composed a whistle theme that was used for the promos, which was composed during a three-day trip from Chandigarh to Mussoorie. He added, "I told my music producer, who was travelling with me, that we have to record it as soon as we reach there because it has to go in three days. So I conceptualised the theme on the way and completed it by the time we reached Mussoorie." The theme was created very quickly as he wanted to launch the film soon, so that it could be used for the promotional teaser that released during the Netflix Tudum fan event.

The soundscape for Khufiya consisted of yesteryear compositions which Bhardwaj sorted as "some of my most favourite ones from a period which had very good tunes. This came out of the character who dances when she's alone at home." As he was insisted to convey the emotions through music, he found it a bit difficult but worked in favor of the film.

== Release ==
Khufiya's music was launched at an event named Raaz Aur Saaz: A Khufiya Musical Night on 7 September 2023. The event saw live performances of the film's music by Rekha Bhardwaj, Vishal Bhardwaj, Sunidhi Chauhan and Rahul Ram, who also performed other compositions from Bhardwaj's films. It was attended by Ali Fazal and Wamiqa Gabbi, amongst 200 other fans and media personnel. The same day, VB Music distributed the soundtrack to digital platforms.

== Reception ==
Anuj Kumar of The Hindu wrote "The use of the whistling effect, sarangi, and the everyday sounds in the background score adds a lyrical heft to the thriller." Sneha Bengani of CNBC TV18 wrote "The only source of redemption in this soulless slog is Bhardwaj’s music. Some of the songs, especially Mat Aana and Na Hosh Chale, are going to find their way to your playlist. They brim with the potential to become the kind of timeless songs that grow bigger than the films they were made for and eventually find a distinct identity and following of their own." Nandini Ramnath of Scroll.in stated "Bhardwaj's own original score is used as scraps in a narrative that has far too much ground to cover and not enough time to linger on the melodies or their lyrics."

Rahul Desai of Film Companion described the song "Mat Aana" as "hypnotic" and "sounds like a classic". Dhaval Roy of The Times of India wrote "With poet and lyricist Gulzar, Bharadwaj creates magic again, whether with the melancholic Mat Aana rendered by Rekha Bharadwaj or the energetic and folksy Mann na rangaav by Rahul Ram." Joginder Tuteja of Bollywood Hungama wrote "Vishal Bhardwaj's music doesn't have a shelf life but is well woven into the narrative." Lalitha Suhasini of Film Companion wrote "Whether the music of Khufiya endures remains to be seen, but at no point does it lose its distinctly Bhardwaj groove."

== Track listing ==
Khufiya (Original Motion Picture Soundtrack) track listing
No.	Title	Lyrics	Singer(s)	Length
1.	"Dil Dushman" (Male)	Gulzar	Arijit Singh	3:22
2.	"Mat Aana"	Vishal Bhardwaj	Rekha Bhardwaj, Niladri Kumar	4:46
3.	"Na Hosh Chale"	Gulzar	Arijit Singh	3:57
4.	"Bujhee Bujhee"	Abdul Rahim Khan-i-Khanan	Rahul Ram, Jyoti Nooran	5:00
5.	"Tanhai"	Gulzar	Vishal Bhardwaj, Kiran + Nivi	4:51
6.	"Mann Na Rangaave"	Kabir	Rahul Ram	3:19
7.	"Dil Dushman" (Female)	Gulzar	Sunidhi Chauhan	3:00
8.	"Tanhai" (Sunidhi's Version)	Gulzar	Sunidhi Chauhan	3:17
9.	"Na Hosh Chale" (Film Version)	Gulzar	Vishal Bhardwaj	4:01
Total length:				35:00

== Personnel ==
Album credits

- Music composer: Vishal Bhardwaj
- Lyrics: Gulzar, Vishal Bhardwaj, Abdul Rahim Khan-i-Khanan and Kabir
- Singers: Vishal Bhardwaj, Arijit Singh, Sunidhi Chauhan, Rekha Bhardwaj, Rahul Ram, Niladri Kumar, Jyoti Nooran, Kiran + Nivi
- Music producer: Nyzel D'Lima, Debarpito Saha
- Recording: Salman Khan Afridi (Satya Studio, Mumbai)
- Mixing: Stephen Fitzmaurice (The Pierce Room, London), Alok Punjani (Studio208, Mumbai), Salman Khan Afridi (Satya Studio, Mumbai)
- Mastering: Christian Wright (Abbey Road Studios, London), Alok Punjani (Studio208, Mumbai)

Musician credits

- Electric guitar: Nyzel D'Lima, Mayukh Sarkar, Debarpito Saha
- Bass: Nyzel D'Lima, Saurabh Suman
- Sitar: Niladri Kumar
- Strokes: Debarpito Saha
- Flute and clarinet: I. D. Rao

== Khufiya Live ==
Khufiya Live

Live album by Vishal Bhardwaj
- Released: 21 September 2023
- Recorded: 7 September 2023
- Venue: Mumbai
- Length: 19:51
- Language: Hindi
- Label: VB Music
- Producer: Nyzel D'Lima; Debarpito Saha

A live album was released on 21 September 2023. The album featured four tracks, all of them were live performances of the tracks at the musical night event. The songs were performed by Rekha Bhardwaj, Vishal Bhardwaj and Sunidhi Chauhan. The album was recorded live by Tanay Gajjar, who also mixed and mastered it at his Wow & Flutter Studio, Mumbai.

No.	Title	Lyrics	Performer(s)	Length
1.	"Dil Dushman" (live)	Gulzar	Sunidhi Chauhan	4:11
2.	"Mat Aana" (live)	Vishal Bhardwaj	Rekha Bhardwaj	5:57
3.	"Na Hosh Chale" (live)	Gulzar	Vishal Bhardwaj	5:42
4.	"Tanhai" (live)	Gulzar	Vishal Bhardwaj	3:58
Total length:				19:51
