= Kuttey (soundtrack) =

Kuttey (Original Motion Picture Soundtrack)

Soundtrack album by Vishal Bhardwaj
- Released: 9 January 2023
- Recorded: 2021–2022
- Studio: Studio Satya, Mumbai; Notting Hill Studios, Mumbai; White Noise, Mumbai; Studio208, Mumbai; Wow & Flutter, Mumbai; YRF Studios, Mumbai; Kiran + Nivi, San Diego; Capricon, San Diego; The Pierce Room, London; Abbey Road, London
- Genre: Feature film soundtrack
- Length: 30:02
- Language: Hindi
- Label: T-Series
- Producer: Debarpito Saha

Vishal Bhardwaj chronology
Darlings (2022)	Kuttey (Original Motion Picture Soundtrack) (2023)	Fursat (2023)
External audio
- Kuttey – Full Album on YouTube

Kuttey (Original Motion Picture Soundtrack) is the soundtrack album to the 2023 film of the same name directed by Aasmaan Bhardwaj. The film's musical score and soundtrack is composed by Vishal Bhardwaj with lyrics are penned by Gulzar and Faiz Ahmad Faiz. The album was released under the T-Series label on 9 January 2023.

== Development ==
Kuttey marked the directorial debut of Vishal Bhardwaj's son Aasmaan, who, like his father, had felt that music being an integral part of the story; he kept a one-line description of the specific kind of songs playing in the background signifying its importance in the script. Vishal, who was enthusiastic on his son's debut, claimed that he loved scoring for his son, which was a new experience for him and his longtime collaborator Gulzar. Speaking to IANS, he opened up on working with his son, adding: "Sometimes, he used to reject the tune because he didn't like it. Other times, he did not like the music of the stanza. I was working for a director after a long time and that too with my own son."

Vishal's composition "Dhan Te Nan" from Kaminey (2009) was recreated twice for the film. The song "Ek Aur Dhan Te Nan" is a modified version of the former which was sung by Jyoti Nooran and rap versions performed by Hanumankind. "Phir Dhan Te Nan" is a revamp of the original song performed by the same singers: Sukhwinder Singh and Vishal Dadlani; Vishal wrote the song for a potential sequel to Kaminey, which did not materialize. But Aasman, who knew about the song insisted him to use it in the background, to which he agreed. Vishal was initially reluctant on adapting the new song, as he wanted to integrate the originality of "Dhan Te Nan" with a freshness. Vishal and Aasmaan discussed multiple times on the new version of the song as well as conducting numerous jamming sessions before finalizing the new version.

Vishal roped in San Diego-based pop duo Kiran + Nivi (Note: a duo consisting of twin sisters Kiran and Nivi Saishankar, also referred to as Sai sisters.) to record the melody song "Tere Saath". Other singers who performed the rest of the songs in the album, includes Rekha Bhardwaj, Sunidhi Chauhan and Avadhoot Gupte.

== Marketing and release ==
The first song "Awaara Dogs" was released as a single on 23 December 2022. The second single "Phir Dhan Te Nan" was released on 4 January 2023. The film's music was launched at "Mehfil-E-Khaas" (transl. special gathering) musical event on 9 January 2023. Besides the cast members attending the event, it also witnessed live performances from Gulzar, Vishal and Rekha Bhardwaj, who orchestrated and performed songs from the film as well as Vishal's compositions from his previous films. The film's soundtrack was released on the launch event. Afterwards, the video songs of "Tere Saath" and "Vaat Lagli" were released subsequently.

== Reception ==
Nandini Ramnath of Scroll.in wrote "Vishal Bhardwaj's background score includes a musical piece that comically sounds like an ogre at the bottom of the ocean clearing his throat." Monika Rawal Kukreja of Hindustan Times wrote "The album composed by Vishal with lyrics penned by Gulzar sahab, each song seems aptly placed in the story and only takes it forward. And the way Kuttey plays out Vishal's iconic Dhan Te Nan in the background in all important scenes, is just terrific." Pratikshya Mishra of The Quint wrote "The music and background score, courtesy Vishal Bhardwaj is perhaps one of the best parts of the film, especially when paired with Gulzar's lyrics."

Ronak Kotecha of The Times of India wrote "What lifts 'Kuttey's constantly dark and gritty narrative is the catchy tune of Vishal Bharadwaj’s iconic composition 'Dhan te nan' that lingers in the background. The film's original score by Vishal, infused with Gulzar's unique lyrics, blend well with the screenplay without stalling the pace of the film." Sanchita Jhunjhunwala of Times Now wrote "The entire jukebox of this movie is beautiful, and at times quirky. [...] Gulzar saab is a magician, and Vishal as well as Rekha are equally absolute gems that we've found in the industry." Zinia Bandyopadhyay of India Today wrote "One just cannot miss mentioning the music and the background score that injects intensity and life into the script. Vishal Bharadwaj's music, along with Gulzar's lyrics, can only cast magic, and it happens here as well."

In contrast, Lalitha Suhasini of Film Companion wrote "even after multiple listens, Kuttey (2023) does not make a case for a hit." Karthik Srinivasan of Milliblog mentioned that "nothing worked for [him] in Kuttey's soundtrack" except for "Tere Saath"; Srinivasan praised Vishal's efforts for bringing the TikTok stars Kiran + Nivi for the female vocals, and further wrote "The melody is deeply resonant and sweeping in appeal—made better by the singing—and Vishal jigs it beautifully with the restless drums in the background that offers wonderful contrast."

== Track listing ==
Kuttey (Original Motion Picture Soundtrack) track listing
No.	Title	Lyrics	Singer(s)	Length
1.	"Awaara Dogs"	Gulzar	Vishal Dadlani	3:36
2.	"Tere Saath"	Gulzar	Vishal Bhardwaj, Kiran + Nivi	4:06
3.	"Ek Aur Dhan Te Nan"	Gulzar	Jyoti Nooran, Hanumankind	4:46
4.	"Azaadi"	Gulzar	Sukhwinder Singh	4:30
5.	"Vaat Lagli"	Gulzar	Avdhoot Gupte	2:43
6.	"Kuttey" (Title Track)	Faiz Ahmad Faiz	Rekha Bhardwaj	2:54
7.	"Khoon Ki Khushboo"	Gulzar	Sunidhi Chauhan	3:06
8.	"Phir Dhan Te Nan"	Gulzar	Sukhwinder Singh, Vishal Dadlani	4:20
Total length:				30:01

== Personnel ==
- Music composer: Vishal Bhardwaj
- Lyricists: Gulzar, Faiz Ahmad Faiz
- Singers: Vishal Bhardwaj, Vishal Dadlani, Jyoti Nooran, Hanumankind, Kiran + Nivi, Sukhwinder Singh, Avadhoot Gupte, Sunidhi Chauhan
- Music producer, electric and nylon string guitar: Debarpito Saha
- Music editor: Sitanshu Datta
- Chorus: Vishal Bhardwaj, Debarpito Saha, Kiran + Nivi, Anant Bhardwaj, Mandar Apte, Janardhan Dhatrak, Swapnil Godbole, Abhishek Marotkar, Archana Gore, Aditi Prabhudesai, Pragati Joshi, Dattatray Mestri
- Bass: Saurabh Suman
- Horns: Blackjack Horns UK
- Rhythm: Varad Kulkarni, Omkar Ingawale, Krishna Masale, Ganesh Thorat, Montu Gosavi, Pratap Raat
- Rhythm arrangements: Raju Kulkarni
- Recording: Salman Khan Afridi (Satya Studio, Mumbai), Jigar Saraiya (White Noise Studio, Mumbai), Debarpito Saha (Notting Hill Studios, Mumbai), John Joyce (Capricorn Studios, San Diego), Nivi Saishankar (Kiran + Nivi Studios, San Diego), Abhishek Khandelwal and Dileep Nair (YRF Studios, Mumbai)
- Mixing: Stephen Fitzmaurice (The Pierce Room, London), Alok Punjani (Studio208, Mumbai), Tanay Gajjar (Wow & Flutter Studio, Mumbai), Salman Khan Afridi (Satya Studio, Mumbai)
- Mastering: Christian Wright (Abbey Road Studios, London)
