= Deewani Mastani =

2015 Hindi song

- Deewani Mastani cover featuring Deepika Padukone

Song by Shreya Ghoshal (Backing vocals by Ganesh Chandanshive/Divya Kumar(Dubbed Version), Mujtaba Aziz Naza, Altamash Faridi, Farhan Sabri)

from the album Bajirao Mastani (soundtrack)
- Language: Hindustani and Marathi
- Released: 21 October 2015
- Recorded: Wow & Flutter Studio, Mumbai
- Genre: Filmi, Maharashtra Folk, Qawwali
- Length: 5:40
- Label: Eros Now
- Composer: Sanjay Leela Bhansali
- Lyricists: Siddharth-Garima (Marathi Lyrics by Ganesh Chandanshive) (Qawwali Lyrics by Nasir Faraaz)
- Producer: Sanjay Leela Bhansali

Bajirao Mastani (soundtrack) track listing
- 1. "Deewani Mastani"; 2. "Aayat"; 3. "Malhari"; 4. "Mohe Rang Do Laal"; 5. "Albela Sajan"; 6. "Ab Tohe Jane Na Doongi"; 7. "Pinga"; 8. "Aaj Ibaadat"; 9. "Fitoori"; 10. "Gajanana"

Music video
- "Deewani Mastani" on YouTube

"Deewani Mastani" is a song from the 2015 Hindi film Bajirao Mastani. The song is composed by Sanjay Leela Bhansali and sung by Shreya Ghoshal, while backing vocals were given by Ganesh Chandanshive, Mujtaba Aziz Naza, Altamash Faridi and Farhan Sabri. The lyrics were majorly penned by Siddharth-Garima. Ganesh Chandanshive penned the Marathi lyrics while the Qawwali lyrics were written by Nasir Faraaz. The song features Deepika Padukone, Ranveer Singh and Priyanka Chopra in the video. The movie was dubbed in Tamil and Telugu and hence the song was also released as "Thindaadi Poagiraen" in Tamil and "Mastani" in Telugu on 25 November 2015. Shreya Ghoshal rendered her voice to all the three versions of the song. The song was reprised in MTV Unplugged Season 6 and was also rendered by Ghoshal.

== Development ==
Deewani Mastani is recorded, mixed and mastered by Tanay Gajjar at Wow & Flutter Studio in Mumbai. The song is arranged and programmed by Shail-Pritesh. The song was choreographed by Remo D'Souza, who made the dance a combination of Classical and Contemporary. Remo complimented Deepika Padukone for her dance skills by saying that her movements and expressions are perfect. The shooting of the song took ten days at a very expensive set created at Film City, Mumbai, in which over 20,000 intricately designed mirrors were used. Sanjay Leela Bhansali took inspiration from K. Asif's Mughal-e-Azam for this song in trying to create the Aina Mahal. It is his contemporary version of the classic song "Pyar Kiya To Darna Kya". The premise between the two songs is also similar. While in that "Pyar Kiya To Darna Kya" courtesan Anarkali dances for Prince Salim, in this one princess Mastani dances and declares her love for Bajirao. After the release of the song, the set of the song was being considered to be turned into a museum. Originally, The song was offered to Monali Thakur but eventually went to Shreya Ghoshal.

== Release ==
The song was released in a grand event held in Delhi on 21 October 2015. The launch was followed by Day 1 of Blenders Pride Fashion Week where Deepika Padukone turned show stopper for the designer Anju Modi, who also designed costumes for the Sanjay Leela Bhansali film. The song was also uploaded on Eros Now YouTube channel on 22 October 2015.

== Video ==
The music video features Deepika Padukone as Mastani dancing in a grand hall surrounded by 20,000 mirrors. She is accompanied by a group of back-up dancers. For the song, she wears a heavy golden anarkali lehenga, and sings directly to Ranveer Singh (as Bajirao), expressing her love for him while he watches her happily. Sitting above in a balcony, Priyanka Chopra as Kashibai looks down upon the action. Though at first mesmerized, she comes to a dismayed realization by the end of the song that Bajirao and Mastani are in love.

The teaser video was released on 22 October 2015 and the full video on 2 May 2016. The music video was highly praised for Padukone's performance and the "sweet voice" rendered by Shreya Ghoshal. Remo D'Souza won the National Film Award for Best Choreography. Both the versions of video received 50+ million views leading to a total of 100+ million views on YouTube.

== Reception ==
The song was inspired by "Pyar Kiya To Darna Kya" from Mughal-e-Azam and thus was observed as its modern version, while Deepika was compared to Madhubala. The song, turned extremely popular and topped various countdown charts. By October 2016, the official music video crossed over 46 Million views and the official film version crossed over 15 Million views on YouTube. Due to popularity and high demand, the singer of the song, Shreya Ghoshal, performed this number in many of her concerts, in and outside India. The music composition by Sanjay Leela Bhansali was also highly applauded. Amitabh Bachchan praised Bhansali and wrote on his blog, "The music tracks of 'Bajirao Mastani'... quite something... the purity of music and its tributaries seem to be getting revived.". Reviewing for Firstpost, critic Subhash K. Jha praised Ghoshal's singing by saying, "The soundtrack of Bajirao Mastani has no Lata Mangeshkar. But it has lots of Shreya Ghoshal, Lata Ji's most melodious disciple. This girl can bend the most evocative lyrics into seductive shapes and leave us wondering if she is trying to tell us something beyond the words.". Critic R.M. Vijaykar, reviewing for India-West, praised the composition and "electrifying" vocals of Ghoshal by saying, "The heroine of the score is Shreya Ghoshal, Bhansali's own magic find." and described Bhansali's work as creditable. Critic Surabhi Redkar, reviewing for Koimoi praised the touch given by Maharashtrian and Qawwali lyrics saying, "The song is not just a treat to watch, but to hear it too!".

== Chart performance ==
The song debuted on Mirchi Music Top 20 countdown on 7 November 2015 at 6th position. The song rose up to the 1st position in the next few weeks. The song stayed in the chart for 21 weeks, out of which it was in Top 5 for more than 12 consecutive weeks. Due to this, the song was marked a Platinum Jubilee Song and it stayed in the Top 20 chart till 1 April 2016.

Year	Chart	Peak Position	Time Span on Chart	Ref.
2015-2016	Mirchi Music Top 20 Countdown	1	21 weeks	

== Accolades ==
Year	Award	Nominee	Category	Result
2016	Filmfare Awards	Shreya Ghoshal	Best Female Playback Singer	Won
2016	Global Indian Music Academy Awards	Shreya Ghoshal	Best Female Playback Singer	Won
2016	Global Indian Music Academy Awards	Shail–Pritesh	Best Music Arranger and Programmer	Won
2016	International Indian Film Academy Awards	Shreya Ghoshal	Best Female Playback Singer	Nominated
2016	International Indian Film Academy Awards	Tanay Gajjar	Best Sound Recording	Won
2015	Mirchi Music Awards	Sanjay Leela Bhansali, Siddharth–Garima	Song of the Year	Nominated
2015	Mirchi Music Awards	Shreya Ghoshal	Female Vocalist of the Year	Nominated
2015	Mirchi Music Awards	Sanjay Leela Bhansali	Music Composer of the Year	Nominated
2015	Mirchi Music Awards	Siddharth–Garima, Nasir Faraaz, Ganesh Chandanshive	Lyricist of the Year	Nominated
2015	Mirchi Music Awards	Shail–Pritesh	Best Song Producer (Programming & Arranging)	Won
2015	Mirchi Music Awards	Tanay Gajjar	Best Song Engineer (Recording & Mixing)	Won
2016	National Film Awards	Remo D'Souza	Best Choreography	Won
2016	Times of India Film Awards	Sanjay Leela Bhansali	Best Music Composer	Won
2016	Times of India Film Awards	Shreya Ghoshal	Best Female Playback Singer	Nominated
2016	Times of India Film Awards	Sanjay Leela Bhansali, Siddharth–Garima	Song of the Year	Nominated
2016	Zee Cine Awards	Shreya Ghoshal	Best Female Playback Singer	Nominated
2016	Zee Cine Awards	Remo D'Souza	Best Choreography	Nominated
2016	Guild Film Awards	Remo D'Souza	Best Choreography	Won

== See also ==
- Bajirao Mastani (2015)
- Bajirao Mastani (soundtrack)
- Mohe Rang Do Laal
