= Zero (soundtrack) =

Soundtrack album by Ajay–Atul and Tanishk Bagchi
- Released: 21 December 2018
- Recorded: 2018
- Genre: Feature film soundtrack
- Length: 27:15
- Language: Hindi
- Label: T-Series
External audio
- Audio Jukebox on YouTube

Ajay–Atul chronology
Thugs of Hindostan (2018)	Zero (2018)	Super 30 (2019)

Tanishk Bagchi chronology
Baazaar (2018)	Zero (2018)	Simmba (2018)

Zero is the soundtrack album to the 2018 film of the same name directed by Aanand L. Rai starring Shah Rukh Khan, Anushka Sharma and Katrina Kaif. The album featured seven songs, with four of them composed by Ajay–Atul and three songs by Tanishk Bagchi, who worked as a guest composer. Irshad Kamil and Kumaar were the lyricists. The album was released by T-Series on 21 December 2018.

== Background and release ==
Ajay–Atul composed the film score and soundtrack in his maiden collaboration with Khan and Rai, who had tuned four songs for the film. Tanishk Bagchi later joined the film as a guest composer, providing three more songs, totaling up to seven songs in the album. Bagchi recreated Nusrat Fateh Ali Khan's qawwali number "Main Roz Roz Tanha Hua" with additional lyrics written by Irshad Kamil.

The first song from the album, "Mere Naam Tu" was released as a single on 23 November 2018. It was sung by Abhay Jodhpurkar in his Bollywood debut. The song is an orchestral ballad picturized on Bauua (Shah Rukh) expressing her love for Aafia (Sharma). Jodhpurkar was offered by the duo after a YouTube video of him performing one of their compositions, "Jiv Rangala" from Jogwa (2009) as a part of a medley in a reality television singing-competition show impressed them. They initially wanted him to sing "Sapna Jahan" from Brothers (2015), which he unable to do so as he was not in Mumbai during that time. Jodhpurkar recorded the song in C-sharp major that had him experiment with the vocals. The piano pieces were played and arranged by Ustad K. Shayan-Hussaini, with the flute by Varad Kathapurkar and the Nylon guitar by Pawan Rasayli.

The second song "Issaqbaazi" was released on 4 December 2018; a fast-paced, rustic dance number picturized on a jubilant Bauua dancing with Salman Khan after being kissed by Babita Kumari (Kaif), it was sung by Sukhwinder Singh and Divya Kumar. The third song "Hushn Parcham" was released on 12 December 2018. A dance number picturized on Babita, the song was sung by Bhoomi Trivedi and Raja Kumari. On 20 December 2018, a fourth song was released, titled "Heer Badnaam." Revealing the stardom and personal issues of Babita Kumari, and depicting Bauua as her long-standing fan, the song is reminiscent of the Punjabi song "Daru Badnaam" by Kamal Kahlon and Param Singh; it is composed by Tanishk Bagchi, with lyrics written by Kumaar, and sung by Romy.

The remaining songs "Ann Bann", "Tanha Hua" and "Duma Dam Mast Kalandar" was released with the album on the same date as the film, 21 December 2018 by the T-Series label.

== Reception ==
Narendra Kusnur of The Hindu wrote "like many other later SRK films like Ra.One, Jab Tak Hai Jaan, Chennai Express and Dilwale, the music is a mix of occasional brilliance and well-picturised mediocrity." Joginder Tuteja of Bollywood Hungama wrote "Zero is a complete album and is one of the best that 2018 had to offer." DJ Munks of BizAsia Live wrote "Overall this album is a wholesome one as expected from a King Khan film but none of the songs are capable of becoming huge like some of his previous superhits." Nandini Ramnath of Scroll.in called it as a "swooning" score, while Anupama Chopra of Film Companion praised the song "Mere Naam Tu".

== Track listing ==
Zero (Original Motion Picture Soundtrack)
No.	Title	Lyrics	Music	Singer(s)	Length
1.	"Mere Naam Tu"	Irshad Kamil	Ajay–Atul	Abhay Jodhpurkar	5:38
2.	"Issaqbaazi"	Irshad Kamil	Ajay–Atul	Sukhwinder Singh, Divya Kumar	5:20
3.	"Husn Parcham"	Irshad Kamil	Ajay–Atul	Bhoomi Trivedi, Raja Kumari	3:07
4.	"Ann Bann"	Irshad Kamil	Ajay–Atul	Kunal Ganjawala	4:34
5.	"Tanha Hua"	Irshad Kamil	Tanishk Bagchi	Jyoti Nooran, Rahat Fateh Ali Khan	4:02
6.	"Heer Badnaam"	Kumaar	Tanishk Bagchi	Romy	2:21
7.	"Duma Dam Mast Kalandar"	Traditional	Tanishk Bagchi	Altamash Faridi	2:13
Total length:					27:15

== Accolades ==
Accolades for Zero (Original Motion Picture Soundtrack)
Award (Note: Awards, festivals and organizations are in alphabetical order.)	Date of ceremony (Note: Date is linked to the article about the awards held that year, wherever possible.)	Category	Recipient(s)	Result	Ref.
Filmfare Awards	23 March 2019	Best Music Director	Ajay–Atul	Nominated	
Filmfare Awards	23 March 2019	Best Lyricist	Irshad Kamil – (for "Mere Naam Tu")	Nominated	
Filmfare Awards	23 March 2019	Best Male Playback Singer	Abhay Jodhpurkar – (for "Mere Naam Tu")	Nominated	
International Indian Film Academy Awards	18 September 2019	Best Lyricist	Irshad Kamil – (for "Mere Naam Tu")	Nominated	
International Indian Film Academy Awards	18 September 2019	Best Male Playback Singer	Abhay Jodhpurkar – (for "Mere Naam Tu")	Nominated	
Mirchi Music Awards	16 February 2019	Upcoming Male Vocalist of The Year	Abhay Jodhpurkar – (for "Mere Naam Tu")	Won	
Zee Cine Awards	19 March 2019	Best Lyricist	Irshad Kamil – (for "Mere Naam Tu")	Nominated	
Zee Cine Awards	19 March 2019	Best Playback Singer – Male	Abhay Jodhpurkar – (for "Mere Naam Tu")	Nominated	
