= Nooran Sisters =

Indian singing duo

- Born: Sultana – 14 June 1992 (age 34); Jyoti – 24 February 1994 (age 32)
- Origin: Jalandhar, Punjab, India
- Genre: Sham Chaurasia gharana
- Instruments: Vocals
- Years active: 2010–present
- Members: Sultana Nooran; Jyoti Nooran

Nooran Sisters are Sultana Nooran (born 14 June 1992) and Jyoti Nooran (born 24 February 1994), an Indian devotional Sufi singing duo. Born to a family of Sufi musicians, they perform Sham Chaurasia gharana classical music. They gained public recognition in 2012, when their song "Tung Tung" was featured on MTV Sound Trippin of MTV India and was used in the soundtrack for the 2015 film Singh is Bling.

Nooran Sisters released their first album, Yaar Gariban Da, in 2015. The same year, they received their first major awards, for the song "Patakha Guddi", which appeared in the film Highway, including two Mirchi Music Awards—for Upcoming Female Vocalist of the Year and Vocalist (Female) of the Year. They were also decorated at the Global Indian Music Academy Awards and the Screen Awards. The duo additionally received the Best Playback Singer (Female) award at the Filmfare Awards Punjabi, for the song "Yaar Di Gali", in 2017.

== Early life and background ==
Sultana and Jyoti Nooran trained from early childhood under their father, Ustad Gulshan Mir (or Meer), grandson of Bibi Nooran, a Sufi singer, and son of Swarn Nooran, a Sufi singer of the 1970s. According to Mir, the family was on hard times, and he gave music lessons to support them. The sisters were not able to obtain formal elementary education.

When Sultana was seven and Jyoti five, Mir discovered their talent while they were playing at home and singing a Bulleh Shah kalam they had heard from their grandmother. Mir asked them if they could sing it with instruments. They sang with a perfect beat along to instruments such as the tabla and harmonium.

The Nooran sisters had their first television appearance on the Doordarshan Punjabi show Jashan Di Raat, in 2005. Jyoti as a solo artist participated in the singing show Nikki Awaz Punjab Di on the Punjabi channel MH1, in 2007. In 2010, they were noticed by Iqbal Mahal, a music promoter from Canada, who helped them perform to a wider audience.

== Career ==
The Nooran sisters rose to fame with their song "Tung Tung" through the talent hunt series MTV Sound Trippin on MTV India, in 2012. They were introduced to the competition by Hindi film music composer Sneha Khanwalkar. The song was subsequently used in the soundtrack for Akshay Kumar's 2015 film Singh Is Bliing.

The sisters got their first break in Hindi cinema with the music director A. R. Rahman in the 2014 movie Highway, with the song "Patakha Guddi". The track topped Hindi film music charts and earned them two Mirchi Music Awards in 2015, in the categories Upcoming Female Vocalist of the Year and Vocalist (Female) of the Year, as well as the Best Music Debut Award at the Global Indian Music Academy Awards and the Best Female Playback Singer award at the Screen Awards. Later the same year, they performed on MTV Unplugged and Coke Studio, with the song "Allah Hoo", which turned into a YouTube sensation.

On 2 September 2015, they released their first album, Yaar Gariban Da, containing five tracks and produced by MS Records. In 2017, they received the Best Playback Singer (Female) award from Filmfare Awards Punjabi for the song "Yaar Di Gali", which was included in the 2016 film Channo Kamli Yaar Di. Their song "Baajre Di Raakhi", from the film Krazzy Tabbar, earned them a nomination for the same award a year later.

Jyoti went on to record songs in several Tamil-language films for the composer D. Imman, including Paayum Puli (2015) and Bogan (2017). The duo collaborated with the musicians Memba and EVAN GIIA on the song "For Aisha", which was featured in the 2019 film The Sky Is Pink and the 2022 Disney+ series Ms. Marvel.

=== Global recognition ===
In the 2020s, the Nooran Sisters' vocal performances gained renewed international attention through viral remixes by the Portuguese guitarist and YouTuber André Antunes. Known for blending emotionally expressive vocal samples with metal instrumentation, Antunes remixed several recordings of the sisters' Sufi devotional songs, most notably "Jugni", without formal collaboration or consent. The tracks gained millions of views and introduced the sisters' music to a global audience.

== Personal lives ==
Jyoti married Kunal Passi in 2014. Her parents disapproved of the marriage and filed a legal case of underage marriage, as they claimed Jyoti's matriculation certificate showed her as 16 years of age at the time. After legal proceedings, the family conceded to the marriage. Passi acts as the manager of the sisters' performances. Sultana is also married and has a son.

Jyoti has performed solo on a few occasions. When asked about taking up a solo career, she answered, "Please don't recommend it. We complete each other".

In August 2022, Jyoti filed for divorce from her husband and accused him of harassment.

== Discography ==
=== Albums ===
- Yaar Gariban Da (2015)

Key
Denotes songs sung by Jyoti Nooran alone

=== Film songs ===
Year	Film	Song	Composer(s)	Lyrics	Co-artist(s)	Notes	Ref.
2014	Highway	"Patakha Guddi"	A. R. Rahman	Irshad Kamil	—	Hindi film	
2015	Singh Is Bliing	"Tung Tung Baje"	Sneha Khanwalkar		Diljit Dosanjh	Hindi film	
2015	Dum Laga Ke Haisha	"Dum Laga Ke Haisha"	Anu Malik	Varun Grover	Kailash Kher	Hindi film	
2015	Tanu Weds Manu Returns	"Ghani Bawri"	Krsna Solo	Raj Shekhar	—	Hindi film	
2015	Paayum Puli	"Naa Soodana Mogini"	D. Imman	Vairamuthu	—	Tamil film	
2016	Sultan	"Tuk Tuk"	Vishal-Shekhar	Irshad Kamil	Vishal Dadlani	Hindi film	
2016	Mirzya	"Mirzya"	Shankar-Ehsaan-Loy	Gulzar	Daler Mehndi, Sain Zahoor, Akhtar Chanal Zahri	Hindi film	
2016	Mirzya	"Hota Hai"	Shankar-Ehsaan-Loy	Gulzar	Daler Mehndi, Sain Zahoor, Akhtar Chanal Zahri	Hindi film	
2016	Mirzya	"Ek Nadi Thi"	Shankar-Ehsaan-Loy	Gulzar	Mohan Kannan	Hindi film	
2016	Chaar Sahibzaade: Rise of Banda Singh Bahadur	"Bol Maaye"	Harry Baweja	Rabinder Singh Masroor	—	Punjabi film	
2016	Dangal	"Idiot Banna"	Pritam	Amitabh Bhattacharya	—	Hindi film	
2017	Jab Harry Met Sejal	"Jee Ve Sohaneya"	Pritam	Irshad Kamil	—	Hindi film	
2017	Jab Harry Met Sejal	"Butterfly"	Pritam	Irshad Kamil	Dev Negi, Sunidhi Chauhan, Aman Trikha	Hindi film	
2017	Qarib Qarib Singlle	"Khatam Kahani"	Vishal Mishra	Raj Shekhar	Vishal Mishra	Hindi film	
2017	Bogan	"Kooduvittu Koodu"	D. Imman	Madhan Karky	Aravind Swamy	Tamil film	
2017	Tiger Zinda Hai	"Tera Noor"	Vishal-Shekhar	Irshad Kamil	—	Hindi film	
2018	Saheb, Biwi Aur Gangster 3	"Kesariya Jugni"	Anjjan Bhattacharya	Kumaar	Amit Gupta	Hindi film	
2018	Manmarziyaan	"Hallaa"	Amit Trivedi	Shellee	Romi	Hindi film	
2018	Zero	"Tanha Hua"	Tanishk Bagchi	Irshad Kamil	Rahat Fateh Ali Khan	Hindi film	
2019	Bharat	"Aaya Na Tu"	Vishal-Shekhar	Irshad Kamil	—	Hindi film	
2020	Gunjan Saxena	"Asmaan Di Pari"	Amit Trivedi	Kausar Munir	—	Hindi film	
2020	Sayonee	"Sayonee"	Junoon (recreated by Joy-Anjan)	Junoon (Additional lyrics by Alaukik Rahi)	Arijit Singh	Hindi film	
2021	Qismat 2	"Kis Mod Te"	B Praak	Jaani	B Praak	Punjabi film	
2022	Raksha Bandhan	"Bidaai (Reprise)"	Himesh Reshammiya	Irshad Kamil	Romy	Hindi film	
2022	Laal Singh Chaddha	"Tur Kalleyan (Version 2)"	Pritam	Amitabh Bhattacharya	—	Hindi film	
2023	Kuttey	"Ek Aur Dhan Te Nan"	Vishal Bhardwaj	Gulzar	Hanumankind	Hindi film	
2023	Khufiya	"Bujhe Bujhe"	Vishal Bhardwaj	Vishal Bhardwaj	Rahul Ram	Hindi film	
2023	8 A.M. Metro	"Woh Khuda"	Mark K Robin	Shahbaaz Khan, Manoj Juloori	—	Hindi film	
2023	Bhagavanth Kesari	"Jaaguda Jaaguda"	Thaman S	Ramajogayya Sastry	—	Telugu film	
2024	Guntur Kaaram	"Dum Masala"	Thaman S	Ramajogayya Sastry, Trivikram Srinivas	Sanjith Hegde	Telugu film	
2025	Lokah Chapter 1: Chandra	"Thani Lokah Murakkaari"	Jakes Bejoy	Mu.Ri	Reble	Malayalam film	
2026	Dhurandhar: The Revenge	"Vaari Jaavan"	Shashwat Sachdev	Jasmine Sandlas, Reble	Reble	Hindi film	
2026	Dhurandhar: The Revenge	"Tere Ishq Ne"	Shashwat Sachdev	Kumaar	—	Hindi film	

== Awards and nominations ==
- Gima Awards (2015)
- Screen Awards (2015)

Year	Category	Nominated Song	Album	Result	Ref(s)
Mirchi Music Awards
2014	Female Vocalist of the Year	"Patakha Guddi"	Highway	Won	
2014	Upcoming Female Vocalist of the Year	"Patakha Guddi"	Highway	Won	
2015	Indie Pop Song of the Year	"Teriyaan Tu Jaane"	Coke Studio @ MTV	Nominated	
2017	Indie Pop Song of the Year	"Kamli"	-	Nominated	
Mirchi Music Awards Punjabi
2015	Female Vocalist of the Year	"Jinde Meriye"	Qissa Panjab	Won	
