= Aayat (song) =

2015 Hindi song

Song by: Arijit Singh; Mujtaba Aziz Naza; Shadab Faridi; Altamash Faridi; Farhan Sabri

from the album Bajirao Mastani
- Language: Hindi; Urdu
- Released: 16 December 2015
- Genre: Indian classical; Ghazal; Qawaali
- Length: 4:22
- Label: Eros Now
- Composer(s): Sanjay Leela Bhansali
- Lyricist(s): A. M. Turaz; Nasir Faraaz

Music video
- "Aayat" on YouTube

Aayat (transl. Verse) is an Indian film song from the soundtrack of the music album of Bajirao Mastani. The usage of the word "Aayat" in the song is to describe Bajirao's love for Mastani by saying I remember you like "Aayat" from Bajirao to Mastani. The song is sung by Arijit Singh and the Qawwali vocals are provided by Mujtaba Aziz Naza, Shadab Faridi, Altamash Faridi and Farhan Sabri. It is composed by filmmaker and music composer Sanjay Leela Bhansali, and the lyrics are penned by A. M. Turaz with Qawwali lyrics by Nasir Faraaz. The music video of the song is picturised upon actress Deepika Padukone (Mastani) and actor Ranveer Singh (Bajirao).

== Critical reception ==
Suanshu Khurana of The Indian Express wrote "Arijit Singh's "Aayat", with a strong ghazal and minimum orchestration, gets Singh's voice to shine. There is a qawwali digression, which works well".

== Accolades ==
Year	Award	Nominee	Category	Result
2015	Mirchi Music Awards	Arijit Singh	Male Vocalist of The Year	Nominated
2015	Mirchi Music Awards	Sanjay Leela Bhansali	Music Composer of The Year	Nominated
2015	Mirchi Music Awards	Tanay Gajjar	Best Song Engineer (Recording & Mixing)	Nominated
