= Tiger Zinda Hai (soundtrack) =

- Soundtrack album cover

Soundtrack album by Vishal–Shekhar
- Released: 12 December 2017
- Recorded: 2017
- Genre: Feature film soundtrack
- Length: 25:29
- Language: Hindi
- Label: YRF Music
- Producers: Meghdeep Bose; Abhijit Nalani

Vishal–Shekhar chronology
Befikre (2016)	Tiger Zinda Hai (2017)	Bharat (2019)
External audio
- Audio Jukebox on YouTube

Singles from Tiger Zinda Hai
- 1. "Swag Se Swagat" Released: 19 November 2017; 2. "Dil Diyan Gallan" Released: 26 November 2017

Tiger Zinda Hai is the soundtrack to the 2017 film of the same name directed by Ali Abbas Zafar; a sequel to Ek Tha Tiger (2012), the film stars Salman Khan and Katrina Kaif reprising their roles from the first film. Vishal–Shekhar composed the six-song soundtrack which was produced by Meghdeep Bose and Abhijit Nalani and lyrics are written by Irshad Kamil. The soundtrack was released through YRF Music on 12 December 2017 and became the most-streamed Bollywood soundtrack on YouTube.

== Development ==
Vishal–Shekhar composed the film's soundtrack in their second collaboration with Khan and Zafar after Sultan (2016). They replaced Sohail Sen, the original composer of the predecessor Ek Tha Tiger, whereas Julius Packiam, who did the background score for the first film, returned for the sequel. Vishal Dadlani, Atif Aslam, Sukhwinder Singh, Neha Bhasin, Shreya Ghoshal, Jyoti Nooran and Raftaar performed vocals for the songs. Meghdeep Bose produced two of the songs: "Swag Se Swagat" and "Daata Tu" while Abhijit Nalani produced the remainder of the tracks. According to Bose, the song "Swag Se Swagat" took him nine months for the appropriate sound. The composer duo arranged Packiam's theme track from the first film as the title track "Zinda Hai" to enhance its appeal. Atif Aslam performed the song "Dil Diyan Gallan", despite the ban imposed on Pakistani artists working in Hindi film industry, in response to the 2016 terrorist attack in Jammu and Kashmir. Initially, the song was offered to Arijit Singh before Khan refused him after a dispute with the singer on an award show, back in 2014.

== Release ==
The song "Swag Se Swagat" was released as a single from the album on 19 November 2017. While the song was appreciated for Khan and Kaif's dance, and the composition, it was also accused of being allegedly lifted from the song "The Horns" by DJ Katch. An Arabic version the song was performed by Rabih Baroud and Brigitte Yaghi. The second song "Dil Diyan Gallan" was released on 26 November, with Khan and Kaif appearing at the 11th season of Bigg Boss. The album was released under the YRF Music label on 7 December.

== Reception ==
=== Critical ===
Devarsi Ghosh of Scroll.in wrote "[Vishal–Shekhar] seem to have been on auto-pilot mode in the five original tracks of this shoot-'em-up flick – nothing strikes and nothing lands". Devansh Sharma of Firstpost wrote "the music of Tiger Zinda Hai offers more diversity than that of the first part but its best songs may not end up becoming the most popular of the year." Vipin Nair of The Hindu wrote "Vishal-Shekhar’s only release for the year gives the Tiger series some much needed sonic reprieve." Karthik Srinivasan of Milliblog wrote "This tiger is alive and kicking".

Pramod Gaikwad, writing for International Business Times stated: "To sum up everything, the combination Vishal-Shekhar and Ali Abbas Zafar in Tiger Zinda Hai has once again proved to be a winner after Sultan (2016) in terms of music." Joginder Tuteja of Bollywood Hungama rated three-and-a-half out of five and wrote "The music of Tiger Zinda Hai is primarily situational [...] there is 'Swag Se Swagat' and that should keep the party goers happy till the next Salman Khan film arrives." Ganesh Aaglave of Bollywood Life described the album as "a mixed bag of dancing numbers and soulful melodies."

=== Commercial ===
The album for Tiger Zinda Hai was the most streamed Hindi film soundtrack on YouTube garnering around 1.5 billion views.

== Track listing ==
All tracks are written by Irshad Kamil.

Tiger Zinda Hai (Original Motion Picture Soundtrack) track listing
No.	Title	Singer(s)	Length
1.	"Dil Diyan Gallan"	Atif Aslam	4:20
2.	"Zinda Hai" (Tiger Theme by Julius Packiam)	Sukhwinder Singh, Raftaar	4:14
3.	"Swag Se Swagat"	Vishal Dadlani, Neha Bhasin	3:56
4.	"Daata Tu"	Shreya Ghoshal	4:14
5.	"Tera Noor"	Jyoti Nooran	4:42
6.	"Dil Diyan Gallan" (Unplugged)	Neha Bhasin	4:03
Total length:			25:29

Promotional singles
No.	Title	Singer(s)	Length
1.	"Swag Se Swagat" (Arabic version)	Rabin Baroud, Brigitte Yaghi	3:55

Extended soundtrack
No.	Title	Singer(s)	Length
1.	"Tiger Zinda Hai" (Teaser Theme)	Vishal–Shekhar	1:08
2.	"Tiger Zinda Hai" (Trailer Theme)	Julius Packiam	2:42

== Accolades ==
Accolades for Tiger Zinda Hai (Original Motion Picture Soundtrack)
Award	Date of ceremony	Category	Recipient(s) and nominee(s)	Result	Ref.
Mirchi Music Awards	28 January 2018	Album of The Year	Vishal–Shekhar, Irshad Kamil	Nominated	
