= Phir Le Aya Dil =

Song from the 2012 film Barfi!

Song by Arijit Singh, Rekha Bhardwaj and Shafqat Amanat Ali

from the album Barfi!
- Language: Urdu
- Released: August 20, 2012
- Genre: Ghazal
- Length: 4:45 (original)
- Label: Sony Music India
- Composer: Pritam
- Lyricist: Sayeed Quadri

Music video
- "Phir Le Aya Dil" on YouTube

"Phir Le Aya Dil" (transl. My heart has brought me here again) is a song from the soundtrack of the 2012 Hindi film, Barfi!. Composed by Pritam and written by Sayeed Quadri, there are three versions of the song performed by Arijit Singh, Rekha Bhardwaj, and Shafqat Amanat Ali. The music video of the track features actors Ranbir Kapoor, Ileana D'Cruz, and Priyanka Chopra.

== Background ==
The original version of the song is sung by Rekha Bhardwaj and the reprise and redux versions are rendered by Arijit Singh and Shafqat Amanat Ali respectively. The lead actor of the film, Ranbir Kapoor, selected the version sung by Bhardwaj as one of his favourite songs from the album while stating that Singh did a good job in his rendition as well.

The lyrics include some infrequently-used Urdu wordings including "muyassar," "mukammal," "musalsal," and "badastoor." The original version by Bhardwaj uses the interplay of piano and guitar, laced with Indian sounds in the composition. The reprise version by Singh is sung in a ghazal style and has different moods in the composition, alternating between traditional tabla sounds and percussion and jazz notes with the piano. The redux version by Ali was praised for its powerful rendition and is sung in a Sufi style.

== Release ==
The song was released on 20 August 2012, along with other tracks in the album. The music video of the song was officially released on 24 August 2014 on Sony Music India's YouTube channel.

== Critical reception ==
The Hindustan Times lauded Bhardwaj for her "distinct voice," Singh for his "profound" vocals, and claimed that "Pritam deserves all the kudos for composing such a wonderful song." Bhardwaj received praise for her delicate harkats rendered in the song Yahoo! News lauded Bhardwaj for her "folksy penetrative vocals."

Singh's version was also praised for its "elaborately lovely use of strings" and its fresh arrangement. Bollywood Hungama stated Singh's "prowess with classic music is evident all over again as he goes totally uninhibited" for the track and stated that Singh's vocals stand out, with minimal instruments in the background leading to "zero distraction." In its review of Singh's version, the BBC stated: "Arijit Singh’s rendition of Phir Le Aya Dil is also a joy to behold. The romantic lyrics and gentle ghazal-like arrangement are a refreshing change from the high-pitched, pulsating compositions dominating Hindi film music."

Shafqat Amanat Ali's Redux version of the song was delivered in a ballad format with the music being substantially pared down. Ali's version was noted for its mournful, yearning, and nostalgic undertones. Yahoo! News praised him for his "delightful display of classically refined vocals."

Lyricist Sayeed Quadri received praise for his graceful expression of hope and regret and for effectively "capturing the emotions of a lover hoping to reunite with her beloved."

== Accolades ==
Year	Award	Nominee	Category	Result	Ref
2013	8th Apsara Film & Television Producers Guild Award	Sayeed Quadri	Best Lyricist	Nominated	
2013	14th International Indian Film Academy Awards	Sayeed Quadri	Best Lyricist	Nominated	
2013	14th International Indian Film Academy Awards	Rekha Bhardwaj	Best Female Playback	Nominated	
2013	5th Mirchi Music Awards	Pritam Chakraborty	Music Composer of the Year	Nominated	
2013	5th Mirchi Music Awards	Arjit Singh	Upcoming Male Vocalist of the Year	Nominated	
2012	RMIM Puraskaar	Arijit Singh	Best Sung Solo Song	Won	
2012	RMIM Puraskaar	Arijit Singh	Song of the Year	Won	
