= Dilwale (2015 film) =

2015 Indian film by Rohit Shetty

- Theatrical release poster
- Directed by: Rohit Shetty
- Screenplay by: Yunus Sajawal
- Dialogues by: Sajid-Farhad
- Story by: K. Subash
- Produced by: Gauri Khan; Rohit Shetty
- Starring: Shah Rukh Khan; Kajol; Varun Dhawan; Kriti Sanon; Vinod Khanna; Boman Irani
- Cinematography: Dudley
- Edited by: Bunty Nagi
- Music by: Score: Amar Mohile; Songs: Pritam
- Production companies: Red Chillies Entertainment; Rohit Shetty Productions
- Distributed by: UTV Motion Pictures
- Release date: 18 December 2015
- Running time: 154 minutes
- Country: India
- Language: Hindi
- Budget: ₹165 crore
- Box office: est. ₹376.85 crore

Dilwale (transl. Big-hearted) is a 2015 Indian Hindi-language romantic action comedy film directed by Rohit Shetty, who co-produced the film with Gauri Khan under Red Chillies Entertainment. The film stars Shah Rukh Khan, Kajol, Varun Dhawan, and Kriti Sanon, alongside Boman Irani, Varun Sharma, Johnny Lever, Pankaj Tripathi, Mukesh Tiwari, Kabir Bedi, and Vinod Khanna, in his final film appearance before his death of 27 April 2017.

Dilwale was released theatrically on 18 December 2015, coinciding with the Christmas weekend, and received mixed reviews from critics who praised the chemistry between Khan and Kajol, but criticised the screenplay and runtime. Nonetheless, the film emerged as a commercial success, grossing ₹376.85 crore (US$58.74 million) worldwide to rank as the third highest-grossing Hindi films of 2015 and thirteenth highest-grossing Indian film overseas. At the 61st Filmfare Awards, Dilwale received 5 nominations, including Best Actor (Khan) and Best Actress (Kajol).

== Plot ==
2015: Veer Bakshi and Raj Bakshi are brothers working as car tuners in Panaji. Veer helps Ishita and damages the car of a customer in the process. To discipline him, Raj makes Veer fix the car at night. Veer falls asleep while fixing the car and wakes up to find that the car's sound system has been stolen. Veer soon gets into a tussle with "King", a drug baron, whose henchmen threatened Ishita, and he is injured and gets admitted to the hospital. Raj learns about this and thrashes the gang members, with the help of his friends Shakti and Anwar. Raj burns their stash and reveals himself as "Kaali". King suspects Raj to be Kaali due to the tussle between King and Veer. However, Raj's humbleness convinces King that he is harmless and makes a deal to fix their car in exchange for their safety and protection.

2000: In Sofia, Kaali and Veer are sons of Randhir Bakshi, a crime boss. Kaali comes across Meera during one of their chases with Randhir's rival Dev Narayan Malik. Kaali falls in love with her and the two begin to spend time with each other. During a shipment delivery to Randhir, Kaali gets attacked by Dev's henchmen and Meera reveals herself as Malik's daughter. Meera spares Kaali's life as it was her birthday. Kaali confronts Meera, chases her car and saves her life when she almost falls off a cliff. Overcome by remorse, Meera declares her love for Kaali, who eventually forgives her. Kaali and Meera reveal their relationship to Randhir and Dev, who agree to meet each other. However, Dev tries to kill Kaali and his father in a shootout. Dev and Randhir end up shooting each other to death. Meera sees Kaali holding a gun next to Dev and assumes that Kaali has betrayed her, where she shoots him. Kaali survives and is convinced by Shakti and Anwar to forget about the past and start a new life with his brother Veer, while Meera also starts a new life.

2015: Veer discovers that his friend Siddhu was the thief who stole the car's parts and had been giving them to his boss Oscar, but spares him as Siddhu reveals that he did this for his girlfriend Jenny. Veer proposes to Ishita. Raj learns about their relationship and decides to meet Ishita's sister, who is actually Meera. Upon meeting Raj, Meera immediately forbids Ishita from meeting Veer again. Veer and Ishita try to figure out why their siblings dislike each other so much, so Veer and Siddhu try to confront Shakti (Siddhu's brother) and Anwar. Veer and Ishita scheme together to rekindle Raj and Meera's relationship. Raj's lieutenant Mani steals one of King's cars and brings it to the shop. Veer, Mani and Siddhu discover drugs in the car's decklid and burn them.

Upon realising Ishita loves Veer deeply, Meera issues an ultimatum that Veer must move in with Meera in order to marry Ishita, leaving Raj in the process. Enraged, Veer proceeds to storm out and Meera reveals to Veer that Raj is actually Randhir's adopted son and not Veer's biological brother. Raj confirms this and embraces Veer. Raj confronts Meera for trying to ruin his relationship with his brother, where he reveals that he never betrayed her. Malik's right hand man Raghav meets Meera and confirms Raj's innocence. Meera takes Ishita to Raj's house, declaring that Veer can live with Raj and Ishita after marriage and Meera apologises to Raj.

At Siddhu and Jenny's wedding in a church, King finds his car, which is being used as a wedding car, and brings Mani, Oscar and Veer, demanding to know about his drugs. King loses his temper after learning what happened and a fight ensues in which Raj reveals himself as Kaali and thrashes King. King tries to kill Raj, but Meera takes the bullet and King is beaten up by Raj's friends. Meera is admitted to the hospital, where she recovers and reunites with Raj.

== Cast ==
- Shah Rukh Khan as Raj "Kaali" Bakshi, Randhir's son; Veer's brother; Meera's lover
- Kajol as Meera Malik, Dev's daughter, Ishita's sister, Kaali's lover
- Varun Dhawan as Veer Bakshi, Randhir's son, Kaali's brother, Ishita's lover
  - Mitansh Lulla as Young Veer
- Kriti Sanon as Ishita Malik, Dev’s daughter; Meera's sister; Veer's lover
  - Stuti Dixit as Young Ishita
- Boman Irani as King, a mob boss
- Vinod Khanna as Randhir Bakshi, Kaali and Veer's father
- Kabir Bedi as Dev Malik, Meera and Ishita's father
- Varun Sharma as Siddharth "Sidhu" Saigal, Veer's best friend
- Johnny Lever as Mani Tirupathi
- Mukesh Tiwari as Shakti Saigal, Sidhu's brother, Kaali’s right-hand man
- Pankaj Tripathi as Anwar Ali Mirza, Kaali’s right-hand man
- Chetna Pande as Jenny D'Costa, Sidhu's girlfriend
- Sanjay Mishra as Oscar D'Costa
- Nawab Shah as Raghav Shankar, Malik's henchman

== Production ==
=== Development ===
In January 2015, Rohit Shetty announced a project with Shah Rukh Khan in the lead which would be their second collaboration after the 2013 film Chennai Express. Shetty stated that he would start filming in March 2015. Shetty paired actress Kajol with Khan, making it the seventh time they were cast opposite each other. He also signed actor Varun Dhawan who was reportedly playing Khan's brother, while actress Kriti Sanon was signed opposite him as Kajol's sister.

=== Filming ===
Principal photography began on 20 March 2015 with Dhawan in Goa. Khan and Kajol first joined the crew for filming in Bulgaria in June 2015. Later that month, the first song from the film was shot with Dhawan and Kriti Sanon, in Bulgaria. The schedule there was wrapped up by late July. In August 2015, a romantic song featuring the lead pair was shot in Iceland. The entire team then left for Hyderabad in early September to shoot what was touted to be the final schedule of filming. However, the work in Hyderabad was completed by late October, and filming officially came to an end with a brief schedule in Goa, the same location where it was started. In December, after the promotions had commenced, another song was shot in haste. It featured all four lead actors and had to be played simultaneously with the end-credits.

== Music ==
The soundtrack was composed by Pritam, with lyrics written by Amitabh Bhattacharya. The background score was composed by Amar Mohile. Vocals for Khan were provided by Arijit Singh.

Dilwale

Soundtrack album by Pritam
- Released: 4 December 2015
- Recorded: 2015
- Genre: Feature film soundtrack
- Length: 29:36
- Language: Hindi
- Label: Sony Music India

Pritam chronology
Phantom (2015)	Dilwale (2015)	Kaalakaandi (2018)

A track titled "Gerua" was released on 18 November 2015 as the first single prior to the soundtrack album's release. The second single to be released was "Manma Emotion Jaage" which was released on 26 November 2015. The album features seven tracks and was released on 4 December 2015 by Sony Music India. Sony Music India acquired the music rights of the film for a record ₹190 million (US$2.96 million).

The song "Gerua" also had different versions. An Arabic version called "Telagena" was released on 11 December 2015 while a Malay version entitled "Warna Cinta" featuring vocals from Aliff Aziz and Kilafairy was released later on 18 December 2015.

No.	Title	Singer(s)	Length
1.	"Gerua"	Arijit Singh, Antara Mitra	05:45
2.	"Manma Emotion Jaage"	Amit Mishra, Anushka Manchanda, Antara Mitra	03:29
3.	"Janam Janam"	Arijit Singh, Antara Mitra	03:58
4.	"Tukur Tukur"	Arijit Singh, Neha Kakkar, Nakash Aziz, Siddharth Mahadevan, Kanika Kapoor	04:07
5.	"Daayre"	Arijit Singh	04:50
6.	"Premika"	Benny Dayal, Kanika Kapoor	03:45
7.	"Theme of Dilwale (DJ Chetas)"	Arijit Singh	03:42
Total length:			29:36

Professional ratings
Review scores
Source	Rating
Bollywood Hungama	3.5/5 stars
India West	3.5/5 stars
The Times of India	4/5 stars
Bollywood Life	3.5/5 stars

== Release ==
=== Theatrical ===
Dilwale was released in the United Arab Emirates a day before its worldwide release on 18 December 2015. The film was released in around 3100 screens in India.

On 14 December 2015, in the United Kingdom, the film received a 12A classification from the British Board of Film Classification for "moderate violence". The film's UK distributor chose to remove thirteen seconds to obtain this rating (the excised material being scenes involving stronger violence than possible for a 12A rating). An uncut 15-rated version is available.

=== Home media ===
The satellite rights of the film were sold to Sony Pictures Networks as part of a deal worth ₹2.2 billion (US$34.29 million).

== Box office ==
Dilwale grossed ₹130 crore (US$20.26 million) worldwide in its opening weekend, making it the third highest-grosser of the year.

=== India ===
The film, releasing alongside Bajirao Mastani, opened number one at the box office, and collected ₹210 million (US$3.27 million) nett in India on its opening day, the third highest of the year after Prem Ratan Dhan Payo and Bajrangi Bhaijaan. The film showed a little drop on its second day, and earned nearly ₹200 million (US$3.12 million) nett. On its first Sunday, Dilwale took in approximately ₹230 million (US$3.59 million) nett, bringing the three-day nett to an estimated ₹640 million (US$9.98 million). Dilwale had a first week of ₹970 million (US$15.12 million) nett in the domestic market.

The film earned around ₹210 million (US$3.27 million) nett in its second weekend. It grossed little over ₹310 million (US$4.83 million) nett in week two, taking its business to ₹1.27 billion (US$19.8 million) nett. The film made around ₹110 million (US$1.71 million) nett more in the third week.

Khan expressed disappointment with the film's domestic performance in India. Kajol was also reportedly disappointed, with reports claiming that she regretted turning down the lead role in a Sujoy Ghosh film in favour of Dilwale.

=== Worldwide ===
Dilwale had the highest opening of 2015 abroad and the second highest ever, with a weekend gross of around $8.5 million. The film also set an all-time record opening in the Persian Gulf region. In Pakistan, the film earned ₹65 million (US$1.01 million) in its first three days. The film collected ₹9.13 crore in Pakistan in the first week. The film went on to earn over $13 million overseas in the first week, again the highest of the year.

Dilwale grossed another $3.75 million in the second weekend, for an overall $16.75 million in ten days. After two weeks, the film's earnings abroad were more than $20.5 million. The film had grossed around $23.3 million outside India as of 12 January 2016 to become the highest-grossing film starring Shah Rukh Khan in overseas markets.

Dilwale sales reached more than $25 million following openings in new markets such as Germany, Netherlands and Indonesia. The film went on to earn approximately $26.6 million (INR 1756.5 million) by February 2016. The film's final overseas gross was US$30.2 million (₹194 crore), the highest ever for a Shah Rukh Khan film, and making it the twelfth highest-grossing Indian film overseas.

== Reception ==
Dilwale received mixed reviews from critics. On the review aggregator website Rotten Tomatoes, 20% of 15 critics' reviews are positive, with an average rating of 4/10.

Taran Adarsh from Bollywood Hungama gave the film 4/5 stars, saying, "On the whole, Dilwale is akin to a mouthwatering meal that satiates the craving of those who relish masalathons, besides being an absolute treat for SRK-Kajol fans. An unadulterated crowd-pleaser, Dilwale delivers what you expect from a Rohit Shetty film: King-sized entertainment. Go for it!". Komal Nahta in his review of the film said, "Dilwale is a masala entertainer from the start till the end." Rachit Gupta from Filmfare gave it 4/5 stars and added, "Dilwale is the quintessential popcorn flick. It's colorful, bright and entertaining. It smartly keeps its play on the SRK-Kajol chemistry (watch out for the brilliant ending). It has fantastic music. Decent laughs too. Definitely worth a dekho." Sarita A Tanwar of DNA gave the film 3/5 stars, saying "Dilwale is flawed, but it's right for those who believe that love does conquer it all, actually."

Ananya Bhattacharya of India Today also rated the film 3/5 and concluded, "Dilwale is immensely enjoyable despite an oh-my-god-this-is-so-predictable story. Keep your brains out of the picture, and you have an out-and-out entertainer which fits perfectly in the mould of a guilty pleasure. Go indulge!" Shubha Shetty-Saha of Mid-Day gave the film 3 stars as well and said, "Watch this for the chemistry between SRK and Kajol which refuses to simmer down even after all these years." Meena Iyer from The Times of India gave the film 3/5 stars, criticising the plot, and stated, "Dilwale leans heavily on Shah Rukh's mega-stardom, Varun's effervescence, breathtaking locales (Iceland and Bulgaria), orchestrated car chases and over-the-top situations, which have you chuckling."

== Accolades ==
Award	Category	Recipients and nominees	Result
61st Filmfare Awards	Best Actor	Shah Rukh Khan	Nominated
61st Filmfare Awards	Best Actress	Kajol	Nominated
61st Filmfare Awards	Best Music Director	Pritam	Nominated
61st Filmfare Awards	Best Lyricist	Amitabh Bhattacharya – "Gerua"	Nominated
61st Filmfare Awards	Best Male Playback Singer	Arijit Singh – "Gerua"	Nominated
8th Mirchi Music Awards	Song of The Year	"Gerua"	Won
8th Mirchi Music Awards	Male Vocalist of The Year	Arijit Singh – "Gerua"	Nominated
8th Mirchi Music Awards	Music Composer of The Year	Pritam – "Gerua"	Won
8th Mirchi Music Awards	Upcoming Male Vocalist of The Year	Amit Mishra – "Manma Emotion Jaage"	Nominated
8th Mirchi Music Awards	Best Song Engineer (Recording & Mixing)	Ashwin Kulkarni, Kaushik Das, Nikhil Paul George, Julian Mascarenhas, Emon Goswami, Milena Dobreva & Eric Pillai – "Gerua"	Nominated
