= Eric Pillai =

Indian music artist

- Occupation: Sound engineer, Mixing Engineer, Music producer
- Notable work: Mix of Aashiqui 2

Eric Pillai is an Indian sound engineer, mixing engineer and music producer. He is best known for his mix of Aashiqui 2 soundtrack for which he won GiMA Award for Best Recording Engineer.

== Early life and career ==
Pillai aspired to become a music producer and recording engineer since the age of 11. In 1999 he started working independently and in 2011 he built his own recording setup named as Future Sound of Bombay.

== Accolades ==
Pillai won the GiMA Award for Best Recording Engineer for his mix of the soundtrack of Aashiqui 2. Pillai subsequently won International Indian Film Academy award, in the category of Best Recording Engineer for the song Galliyan.

Year	Award	Song	Film	Category	Result	Ref.
2014	Mirchi Music Awards	"Baby Doll"	Ragini MMS 2	Best Song Engineer (Recording & Mixing)	Nominated	
2015	Mirchi Music Awards	"Sun Saathiya"	ABCD 2	Best Song Engineer (Recording & Mixing)	Nominated	
2015	Mirchi Music Awards	"Gerua"	Dilwale	Best Song Engineer (Recording & Mixing)	Nominated	
2015	Mirchi Music Awards	"Khamoshiyan"	Khamoshiyan	Best Song Engineer (Recording & Mixing)	Nominated	
2016	Mirchi Music Awards	"Beat Pe Booty"	A Flying Jatt	Best Song Engineer (Recording & Mixing)	Nominated	
2017	Mirchi Music Awards	"Roke Na Ruke Naina"	Badrinath Ki Dulhania	Best Song Engineer (Recording & Mixing)	Nominated	
