= Tanay Gajjar =

Indian sound recording engineer

Tanay Gajjar is an Indian sound recording engineer who works as a sound engineer in Hindi cinema.

== Early life and career ==
Tanay Gajjar was born and raised in Mumbai. He started his career in BR Films Studio in 1995. Two years after that, he then joined Sumi Audio Vision where he headed the audio studio for 2 years. In 2000, he headed one of India's leading sound recording studios, AvA Entertainment Pvt Ltd. in Mumbai and worked there for 12 years. In 2012, he finally set up his own recording, mixing and mastering studio and called it Wow&flutteR.

Having worked extensively with music stalwarts, he also works very frequently with noted Bollywood Music Directors.

He has worked on over 200 films in the capacity of sound designer, sound editor, song and background score recording, mixing and mastering.

He has recorded, mixed and mastered numerous successful Pop, Classical, Fusion and Semi Classical Music Albums, national and international. He has been nominated innumerable number of times for prominent awards and recognitions. He has received an IIFA( Indian international Film Awards) award, a Sahara Sangeet Award, a Zee cine Award, and an IRAA (Indian Recording Arts & Artists) award. He has also been awarded a special recognition award for his work done in the musical recreation and digital restoration of the film Mughal-e-Azam.

Apart from being a Studio engineer, he has also been a pioneer as a Live Sound engineer with the following leading artists :- Dr. L Subramaniam, kavita Krishnamurty, Shubha Mudgal, Sunidhi Chauhan, Suzanne D’ Mello, , KK, to name a few. He currently tours with two of Bollywood's leading singers., Sunidhi Chauhan, Shaan, Farhan Akhtar

Beyond that, he designs and provides acoustical consultation for Recording Studios, Mini theaters and Home Theater solutions as well as Live Sound Reinforcement. He has designed and built few recording studios, two mini theaters, most prolifically, the one at Mani Bhavan in Mumbai, it was from Mani Bhavan that Gandhi initiated the Non-Cooperation, Satyagraha, Swadeshi, Khadi and Khilafat movements.

== Filmography ==
- Shastra
- Aur Pyaar Ho Gaya
- Baadshah
- Dushman
- Paanch
- Kaho naa Pyaar hai
- Asambhav
- Hamara Dil aapke paas hai
- Hu Tu Tu
- Hello Brother
- Cchal
- Dhund
- Desh Devi
- Kaise kahoon Ke Pyaar Hai
- Tujhe Meri kasam
- Victoria No. 203
- Pyaar Deewana Hota Hai
- Hum Tumpe Marte hai
- Taj Mahal- An Eternal Love Story
- Hu Kisise Kum Nahin
- Hum Tumhaare hai Sanam
- China Gate
- Duplicate
- Soldier
- Mission Kashmir
- Gadar
- Kachche Dhaage
- Baaz a bird in danger
- Julie
- Monsoon Wedding
- Mughal E Azam
- Paa
- Cheeni Kum
- Saheb Biwi Aur Gangster
- Life of Pi
- Jism 2
- Dil Ka Rishta
- The Hero- Love Story of a spy
- Janasheen
- Dus Kahaaniyan
- Tujhe meri Kasam
- Pinjar
- Yun Hota toh kya hota
- Sunday
- 2 States
- Dil Dhadakne Do
- Katti Batti
- Hero
- Manjhi-The mountain man
- Welcome Back

== Accolades ==
Year	Award	Song	Film	Title	Result	Ref.
2015	Mirchi Music Awards	"Deewani Mastani"	Bajirao Mastani	Best Song Engineer (Recording & Mixing)	Won	
2015	Mirchi Music Awards	"Aayat"	Bajirao Mastani	Best Song Engineer (Recording & Mixing)	Nominated	
2016	Mirchi Music Awards	"Mirzya"	Mirzya	Best Song Engineer (Recording & Mixing)	Nominated	
