= Nikhil Paul George =

Indian singer and producer

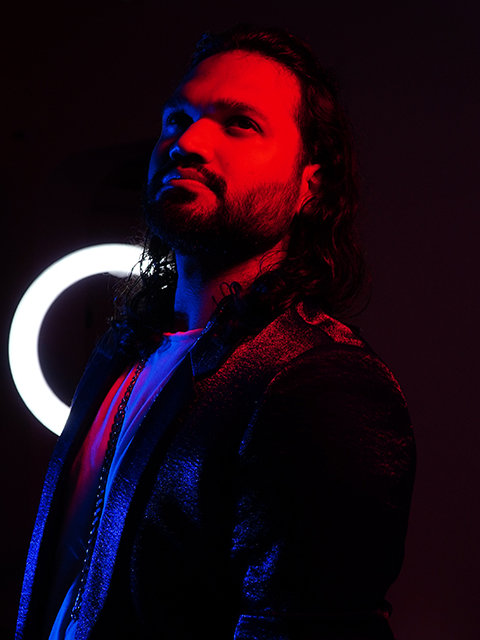
- George in 2022
- Education: Royal College of Music, London, UK
- Occupations: Record producer; composer; singer; guitarist
- Years active: 2008–present
- Labels: Sony Music; T-Series; Disney

Nikhil Paul George is an Indian music producer, singer, and composer based in London. He is best known for his collaboration with composer Pritam since 2008, contributing as a producer, arranger, guitarist and occasional vocalist to the soundtracks of several Bollywood films, including Barfi! (2012), Yeh Jawaani Hai Deewani (2013), Ae Dil Hai Mushkil (2016), Dangal (2016) and Jagga Jasoos (2017).

== Early life ==
Nikhil studied at the Royal College of Music in London. He has worked with composer Pritam since 2008 and has recorded with multiple orchestras in London.

Nikhil provided vocals for the songs "Main Kya Karoon" and "Aashiyan" on the soundtrack of Barfi! (2012), and sang "Nazdeekiyan" with Neeti Mohan for Shaandaar (2015).

In 2023, he performed the song "Farq Nahi Padta" for the Amazon Prime Video series Farzi, composed by Sachin–Jigar with lyrics by Priya Saraiya.

== Selected discography ==
=== As vocalist ===
- 2012 – Barfi! – "Main Kya Karoon", "Aashiyan" (with Shreya Ghoshal)
- 2015 – Shaandaar – "Nazdeekiyan" (with Neeti Mohan)
- 2023 – Farzi – "Farq Nahi Padta"

=== As producer, arranger and guitarist ===
- 2012 – Barfi! (songs and background score)
- 2013 – Yeh Jawaani Hai Deewani
- 2015 – Dilwale
- 2015 – Bajrangi Bhaijaan
- 2016 – Ae Dil Hai Mushkil
- 2016 – Dangal
- 2017 – Jagga Jasoos

=== Studio albums ===
- 2024 – Love in America (album, through NPG Music)
