= Albela Sajan Aayo Re =

Classical Hindi song

Albela Sajan Aayo Re is a classical Hindi song popularized by Ustad Sultan Khan of Indore gharana in the early 1970s. Ustad Sultan Khan sang it in the Bollywood movie, Hum Dil De Chuke Sanam along with Shankar Mahadevan and Kavitha Krishnamurthy, picturised on Aishwarya Rai and Salman Khan. It was also sung by the Mekaal Hasan Band and featured in their 2009 album, Saptak. It was again recreated for the Sanjay Leela Bhansali film Bajirao Mastani and was sung by Shashi Suman, Kunal Pandit, Prithvi Gandharva, Kanika Joshi, Rashi Raagga, Geetikka Manjrekar, this time featuring Priyanka Chopra. The song is based on raag Ahir Bhairav.
