= Sukoon =

Studio album by Sanjay Leela Bhansali
- Released: 30 November 2022
- Recorded: 2020–2022
- Studio: Wow & Flutter; Ajivasan Sounds; Unifi Media; Studio5o4
- Genre: Ghazal; semi-classical; folk
- Length: 40:41
- Language: Hindi
- Label: Saregama Music

Sanjay Leela Bhansali chronology
Gangubai Kathiawadi (2022)	Sukoon (2022)	Heeramandi (2024)

Sukoon is the debut studio album composed by Sanjay Leela Bhansali released under the Saregama label on 30 November 2022. It is Bhansali's maiden stint in non-film music after his compositions for films. The album consisted of nine songs ranging from various genres such as ghazal, semi-classical and Indian folk music. The lyrics were primarily written by A. M. Turaz, Siddharth–Garima and Kumaar, alongside adaptations of poems from Ghalib and Momin Khan Momin.

Since Bhansali's composition debut in Guzaarish (2010), he had expressed his interest to curate a music album which was not conceptualized until the COVID-19 lockdown in India. Bhansali wanted the album to popularize ghazal with the younger generation, resulting in a collaboration of popular artists among different age groups and genres. The album was described by Bhansali as an ode to Lata Mangeshkar and ghazal legends he heard in his childhood.

Sukoon received positive reviews from music critics with praise directed on the composition, instrumentation, setting and soundscape.

== Background ==
Filmmaker Sanjay Leela Bhansali attributed his keen interest on music after listening to Lata Mangeshkar's songs and ghazals from Begum Akhtar, Mehdi Hassan, Ghulam Ali and Jagjit Singh in his formative years. He then debuted as a composer with Guzaarish (2010) which was widely well received, particularly among the youngsters which wanted him to explore more in the music scene. Speaking to Rachana Dubey of Hindustan Times in 2011, Bhansali expressed on developing a private album, saying "There are so many tunes that pass through my mind. A couple can fit into a movie album, and some can find a place of pride in my album. I can’t put a date to it, but it’s something I will do." Bhansali later went to compose for Goliyon Ki Raasleela Ram-Leela (2013), Bajirao Mastani (2015), Padmaavat (2018), Malaal (2019) and Gangubai Kathiawadi (2022), with four of them being his directorial ventures. In September 2021, it was reported that Bhansali would compose an independent album under the title Sukoon and would feature noted musicians and singers collaborating for the songs.

== Composition ==
Sukoon was conceptualized for over a year as the production of Gangubai Kathiawadi halted due to the COVID-19 pandemic in India. During this period, Bhansali wanted to create something independent and fresh from his film-related works. With his likening to ghazal songs and artists, he wanted to curate a ghazal album that would be accessible to the millennials and the young listeners. He further deciphered the album as a tribute to the ghazal artists and legendary musicians.

According to Bhansali, composing an independent album was an entirely different creative process. Since each ghazal had an independent life of its own, composing each ghazal was equivalent to twelve film scores. Since the album had to appeal the youngsters, the vocals were provided by singers from different age groups and genres, such as Shreya Ghoshal, Armaan Malik, Pratibha Singh Baghel, Rashid Khan, Madhubanti Bagchi, Papon and Shail Hada. Though, Suresh Wadkar's daughter Ananya Wadkar was reported to record vocals, she instead played sitar portions for one of the song. The instrumentation accompanied tablas, flute, guitars, sarangi, harmonium and sitar.

Ghoshal who debuted in Devdas (2002) directed by Bhansali and later worked with the latter in his compositions, described that "Every song of this album is special, intricate, detailed, deep. It covers the emotions of love so beautifully." Some of her tracks had a different color and philosophy, while also reflects human emotions.

== Release ==
In April 2021, Bhansali secured a licensing deal with Saregama India Ltd. to distribute the music for their future projects which included on securing the rights for Gangubai Kathiawadi and distributing the Sukoon. The album was initially set to release in late 2021 to coincide Bhansali's 25th year in film industry, (Note: Bhansali debuted in the film industry by directing Khamoshi: The Musical (1996)) but was delayed owing to his work on Gangubai Kathiawadi as well as his norm practice of delaying projects to the last minute. On 28 November 2022, Bhansali announced the album in his social media platforms and set for release on 30 November. The album will be distributed through music streaming platforms. Bhansali dedicated the album to Lata Mangeshkar.

== Reception ==
Suanshu Khurana of The Indian Express in a negative review, wrote "The issue with these tunes is not that they aren't away from the familiar kind, they just aren't glorious – the ache isn't painful enough and the pleasure feels superficial." Subhash K. Jha of Firstpost wrote "Sukoon is an album of endless discovery [...] Sanjay Leela Bhansali’s composition for all the nine Ghazals gives a nod to the compositional greats in the past while forging an entirely new idiom for today’s generation to enjoy." Yatamanyu Narain of News18 wrote "Beyond the aesthetic pleasure of his compositions, Bhansali’s music has a transformative power. It uplifts the spirit, transports the listener to another world, and immerses them in the emotions of the narrative."

== Track listing ==
The track list was revealed on 28 November, the same date as the album's announcement:

Sukoon track listing
No.	Title	Lyrics	Artist	Length
1.	"Qaraar"	Momin Khan Momin	Shreya Ghoshal	5:47
2.	"Ghalib Hona Hai"	A. M. Turaz	Armaan Malik	4:38
3.	"Har Ek Baat"	Ghalib	Pratibha Singh Baghel	4:00
4.	"Gham Na Hone"	A. M. Turaz	Rashid Khan	5:02
5.	"Tujhe Bhi Chand"	Siddharth–Garima	Shreya Ghoshal	4:40
6.	"Siva Tere" (Female)	A. M. Turaz	Madhubanti Bagchi	4:18
7.	"Dard Pattharon Ko"	Kumaar	Papon	4:43
8.	"Muskurahat" (Reprise)	A. M. Turaz	Shail Hada	4:14
9.	"Siva Tere" (Male)	A. M. Turaz	Shail Hada	4:15
Total length:				41:40

== Personnel ==
Credits adapted from Saregama:

Technical

- Composer – Sanjay Leela Bhansali
- Music arrangement – Shail Hada, Shreyas Puranik, Rutvik Talashilkar, Raja Pandit, Shubham Wakhare, Saurabh Wakhare
- Music programming – Shail Hada, Shreyas Puranik, Rutvik Talashilkar, Sanjay Jaipurwale, Shubham Wakhare, Saurabh Wakhare, Kunal Pandit, Rajesh Rathod
- Recording – Tanay Gajjar (Wow & Flutter Studios), Avdhoot Wadkar (Ajivasan Sounds)
- Mixing and mastering – Rahul M. Sharma (Studio5o4)
- Dobly Atmos mixing – Nageshwar Rao Choudary (Unifi Media Studios)
- Musical assistance – Samir Dharap, Rohit Patil, Deepak Poojari

Musicians

- Guitar – Shomu Seal, Rutvik Talashilkar
- Bass guitar – Manas Chowdhary
- Strokes and rabab – Tapas Roy
- Santoor – Prashant Salil
- Sitar – Bhagirath Bhatt, Ananya Wadkar
- Tabla – Sanjeev Sen, Prashant Sonagra
- Rhythm and percussions – Dipesh Varma
- Flute – Varad Kathapurkar, Tejas Vinchurkar
- Violin – Kailash Patra
- Harmonium – Pradeep Pandit
- Sarangi – Liyakat Ali Khan, Momin Khan
