= Animal (soundtrack) =

2023 Hindi-language soundtrack album

- Soundtrack album cover

Soundtrack album by Pritam, A. R. Rahman, Vishal Mishra, Jaani, Manan Bhardwaj, Shreyas Puranik, Ashim Kemson, Harshavardhan Rameshwar, Bhupinder Babbal, JAM8 and Ajay–Atul
- Released: 24 November 2023 (standard); 23 January 2024 (deluxe)
- Recorded: 2022–2023
- Genre: Feature film soundtrack
- Length: 31:03 (Standard); 1:04:26 (Deluxe)
- Language: Hindi
- Label: T-Series
- Producer: Bhushan Kumar
External audio
- Animal (Audio Jukebox) on YouTube
- Animal (Deluxe Edition Album) on YouTube

Singles from Animal
- 1. "Hua Main" Released: 11 October 2023; 2. "Satranga" Released: 28 October 2023; 3. "Papa Meri Jaan" Released: 14 November 2023; 4. "Arjan Vailly" Released: 18 November 2023

Animal is the soundtrack to the 2023 Hindi-language action drama film of the same name directed by Sandeep Reddy Vanga and starring Ranbir Kapoor, Anil Kapoor, Bobby Deol, Rashmika Mandanna and Tripti Dimri. Released by T-Series on 24 November 2023, the soundtrack featured six songs composed by Pritam, A. R. Rahman, Vishal Mishra, Jaani, Manan Bhardwaj, Shreyas Puranik, Ashim Kemson, Harshavardhan Rameshwar, Bhupinder Babbal, JAM8 and Ajay–Atul with lyrics written by Manoj Muntashir, Siddharth–Garima, Raj Shekhar, Jaani, Bhupinder Babbal, Manan Bhardwaj and Ashim Kemson. An extended "deluxe edition" of the album, that contained nine additional songs, released on 23 January 2024. The film's soundtrack set several records in music streaming and social media platforms.

== Background ==
Kapoor described the music for Animal as "multi-genre" and "versatile". The soundtrack was predominantly curated by Vanga himself, who insisted Bhushan Kumar, the film's producer not to interfere during the entire process and would rework on the album if disapproved. Kumar earlier provided suggestions to Vanga for adding additional music in Kabir Singh (2019); this decision was applauded by Kumar, so that the music would be independently molded with the film's narrative. The soundtrack accompanied traditional and electronic instrumentation. The female singers perform the songs in lower octaves, while the male singers perform it in higher notes.

== Singles ==
The soundtrack was preceded with four singles. "Hua Main" was the first to be released from the album, on 11 October 2023. It was composed by Pritam (Note: Although Pritam had originally composed "Hua Main", he, however, credited his music band JAM8.) and sung by Raghav Chaitanya with lyrics written by Manoj Muntashir. The music video shows the intimate romantic relationship between Ranvijay Singh (Ranbir) and Geetanjali (Mandanna). The song became a huge hit.

The second song "Satranga" composed by Shreyas Puranik, written by Siddharth–Garima (who also served as the film's dialogue writer) and sung by Arijit Singh was released on 28 October 2023. The song is a slow ballad and melancholic number, depicting the strained relationship between Ranvijay and Geetanjali post-their marriage.

The third song "Papa Meri Jaan" was released on 14 November 2023. Composed by Harshavardhan Rameshwar, who previously worked with Vanga on Arjun Reddy (2017) and its remake Kabir Singh (2019), the song was performed by Sonu Nigam and written by Raj Shekhar. The song is pictured on the relationship between Ranvijay and his father Balbir (Anil). The song was a huge hit.

On 18 November 2023, the song "Arjan Vailly", which was showcased in the film's pre-teaser was released as the album's fourth single. Bhupinder Babbal wrote and sang the track, (Note: The song was originally composed and written by Kuldeep Manak, which was re-worked by Bhupinder Babbal.) composed by Manan Bhardwaj, which was rooted in Sikh history, and weaves together elements of the film's narrative. The song was composed within 24 hours. The original composition is based on the life of Arjan Singh Nalwa, the son of Sikh military commander Hari Singh Nalwa, during the 18th century. Arjan, hailing from Jagraon near Ludhiana, took up the mantle after his father's death, engaging in battles for the Sikh Empire against the formidable Mughals. The song is structured in the style of Dhadi–Vaar music, traditionally used by Guru Gobind Singh as a war cry against the Mughals to uplift the spirits of his people, where the lyrics signifies an exceptionally fierce individual unbound by conventional laws.

Post the film and the album's release, on 6 December 2023, the song "Jamal Kudu", played during the introduction of Abrar Haque's (Deol) character, was released as a single. The song was originally composed by Iran's Khatareh Group. The original Iranian song is titled "Jamaal Jamaaloo" composed by Zia Atabay in the 1950s and was re-interpreted by Harshvardhan Rameshwar. The song was first sung by Kharazemi Girls High School in 1970s. Over the years, the song became popular at Iranian weddings.

On 14 December 2023, the instrumental theme for Rannvijay's character, featuring a medley of music from Roja (1992) composed by A. R. Rahman, was released.

== Release ==
The soundtrack to Animal was released at a music launch and fan experience event held on 24 November 2023 at Mehboob Studio in Mumbai. Presented by Spotify Premium, the event saw the attendance of Ranbir and Deol, where the former had performed "Hua Main". The same day, the soundtrack was released to music streaming platforms, while it was also unveiled in Telugu, Tamil, Malayalam and Kannada. The songs "Arjan Vailly" and "Haiwaan", written and performed by Bhupinder Babbal and Ashim Kemson respectively, are in Punjabi and were not dubbed in the South Indian soundtracks. A deluxe edition soundtrack featuring nine additional songs were released on 15 January 2024, while in the South Indian versions, only three additional tracks were released.

== Track listing ==
=== Original ===
Animal (Original Motion Picture Soundtrack)
| No. | Title | Lyrics | Music | Singer(s) | Length |
|---|---|---|---|---|---|
| 1. | "Hua Main" | Manoj Muntasir | Pritam, JAM8 | Pritam, Raghav Chaitanya | 4:37 |
| 2. | "Arjan Vailly" | Bhupinder Babbal | Manan Bhardwaj | Bhupinder Babbal | 3:02 |
| 3. | "Satranga" | Siddharth–Garima | Shreyas Puranik | Arijit Singh | 4:31 |
| 4. | "Papa Meri Jaan" | Raj Shekhar | Harshavardhan Rameshwar | Sonu Nigam | 5:22 |
| 5. | "Pehle Bhi Main" | Raj Shekhar | Vishal Mishra | Vishal Mishra | 4:10 |
| 6. | "Kashmir" | Manan Bhardwaj | Manan Bhardwaj | Shreya Ghoshal, Manan Bhardwaj | 3:36 |
| 7. | "Saari Duniya Jalaa Denge" | Jaani | Jaani | B Praak | 3:02 |
| 8. | "Haiwaan" | Ashim Kemson | Ashim Kemson | Ashim Kemson | 2:42 |
| Total length: | | | | | 31:03 |

Animal (Deluxe Edition Album)
| No. | Title | Lyrics | Music | Singer(s) | Length |
|---|---|---|---|---|---|
| 9. | "Papa Meri Jaan" (Child's Version) | Raj Shekhar | Harshavardhan Rameshwar | R. P. Krishaang | 5:24 |
| 10. | "Ranvijay's Entry Medley" | Instrumental | A. R. Rahman | Threeory Band | 3:38 |
| 11. | "Abrar's Entry – Jamal Kudu" | Traditional Iranian Bandari music | Harshavardhan Rameshwar | Sounik, Harshita, Keerthana, Vagdevi, Meghanaa Naidu, Sabiha, Aishwarya Dasari, Abhikhya | 2:14 |
| 12. | "Bhaavein Jaane Ya Na Jaane" | Bhupinder Babbal | Bhupinder Babbal | Bhupinder Babbal | 3:27 |
| 13. | "Marham" (Pehle Bhi Main) | Raj Shekhar | Vishal Mishra | Vishal Mishra | 1:53 |
| 14. | "Satranga" (Stripped) | Siddharth–Garima | Shreyas Puranik | Shreyas Puranik | 3:14 |
| 15. | "Urdu Ke Jaisa Ishq" (Kashmir) | Manan Bhardwaj | Manan Bhardwaj | Manan Bhardwaj | 2:24 |
| 16. | "Saari Duniya Jalaa Denge" (Extended Film Version) | Jaani | Jaani | B Praak | 5:48 |
| 17. | "Papa Meri Jaan" (Whistle) | Instrumental | Harshavardhan Rameshwar | Harshavardhan Rameshwar | 5:22 |
| Total length: | | | | | 1:04:26 |

=== Telugu ===
All lyrics are written by Anantha Sriram.

Animal (Telugu) [Original Motion Picture Soundtrack]
| No. | Title | Music | Singer(s) | Length |
|---|---|---|---|---|
| 1. | "Ammayi" | Pritam | Raghav Chaitanya, Pritam | 4:35 |
| 2. | "Ney Veyrey" | Shreyas Puranik | Karthik | 4:31 |
| 3. | "Nanna Nuv Naa Praanam" | Harshavardhan Rameshwar | Sonu Nigam | 5:21 |
| 4. | "Evarevaro" | Vishal Mishra | Vishal Mishra | 4:10 |
| 5. | "Kashmeeru" | Manan Bhardwaj | Shreya Ghoshal, Yazin Nizar | 3:37 |
| 6. | "Yaalo Yaalaa" | Jaani | Anurag Kulkarni | 3:02 |
| Total length: | | | | 25:18 |

Animal (Telugu) [Deluxe Edition Album]
| No. | Title | Music | Singer(s) | Length |
|---|---|---|---|---|
| 7. | "Nanna Nuv Naa Praanam" (Child's Version) | Harshavardhan Rameshwar | R. P. Krishaang | 5:25 |
| 8. | "Evarevaro" (Soul Version) | Vishal Mishra | Vishal Mishra | 1:53 |
| 9. | "Yaalo Yaalaa" (Extended Film Version) | Jaani | Anurag Kulkarni | 5:48 |
| Total length: | | | | 38:24 |

=== Tamil ===
All lyrics are written by Mohan Rajan.

Animal (Tamil) [Original Motion Picture Soundtrack]
| No. | Title | Music | Singer(s) | Length |
|---|---|---|---|---|
| 1. | "Nee Vaadi" | Pritam, JAM8 | Raghav Chaitanya | 4:35 |
| 2. | "Pogaadhe" | Shreyas Puranik | Karthik | 4:31 |
| 3. | "Nee En Ulagam" | Harshavardhan Rameshwar | Sonu Nigam | 5:21 |
| 4. | "Yaar Yaaro" | Vishal Mishra | Vishal Mishra | 4:10 |
| 5. | "Theeraadha" | Manan Bhardwaj | Shreya Ghoshal, Yazin Nizar | 3:35 |
| 6. | "Moochchaangoode" | Jaani | Mahalingam | 3:02 |
| Total length: | | | | 25:16 |

Animal (Tamil) [Deluxe Edition Album]
| No. | Title | Music | Singer(s) | Length |
|---|---|---|---|---|
| 7. | "Nee En Ulagam" (R. P. Krishaang) | Harshavardhan Rameshwar | Sonu Nigam | 5:25 |
| 8. | "Yaar Yaaro" (Soul Version) | Vishal Mishra | Vishal Mishra | 1:53 |
| 9. | "Moochchaangoode" (Extended Film Version) | Jaani | Mahalingam | 5:48 |
| Total length: | | | | 38:23 |

=== Malayalam ===
All lyrics are written by Mankombu Gopalakrishnan.

Animal (Malayalam) [Original Motion Picture Soundtrack]
| No. | Title | Music | Singer(s) | Length |
|---|---|---|---|---|
| 1. | "Pennaale" | Pritam, JAM8 | Kapil Kapilan | 4:34 |
| 2. | "Nee Vere Njan" | Shreyas Puranik | Karthik | 4:31 |
| 3. | "Neeyanakhilam Thaathaa" | Harshavardhan Rameshwar | Madhu Balakrishnan | 5:21 |
| 4. | "Pala Mukhangal" | Vishal Mishra | Adithya RK | 4:10 |
| 5. | "Kashmirin Saanu" | Manan Bhardwaj | Sithara Krishnakumar, Yazin Nizar | 3:37 |
| 6. | "Enivarumo Aa Nall" | Jaani | Mahalingam | 3:02 |
| Total length: | | | | 25:17 |

Animal (Malayalam) [Deluxe Edition Album]
| No. | Title | Music | Singer(s) | Length |
|---|---|---|---|---|
| 7. | "Neeyanakhilam Thaathaa" (Child's Version) | Harshavardhan Rameshwar | R. P. Krishaang | 5:25 |
| 8. | "Pala Mukhangal" (Soul Version) | Vishal Mishra | Adithya RK | 1:53 |
| 9. | "Enivarumo Aa Nall" (Extended Film Version) | Jaani | Mahalingam | 5:48 |
| Total length: | | | | 38:24 |

=== Kannada ===
All lyrics are written by Varadaraj Chikkaballapura.

Animal (Kannada) [Original Motion Picture Soundtrack]
| No. | Title | Music | Singer(s) | Length |
|---|---|---|---|---|
| 1. | "Oh Baale" | Pritam, JAM8 | Raghav Chaitanya | 4:35 |
| 2. | "Naa Bere Nee Bere" | Shreyas Puranik | Karthik | 4:31 |
| 3. | "Nanna Ravi Neene" | Harshavardhan Rameshwar | Sonu Nigam | 5:21 |
| 4. | "Nooraru" | Vishal Mishra | Adithya RK | 4:10 |
| 5. | "Kaashmira Thaana" | Manan Bhardwaj | Sithara Krishnakumar, Yazin Nizar | 3:37 |
| 6. | "Appa Nee Nagu" | Jaani | Anurag Kulkarni | 3:02 |
| Total length: | | | | 25:18 |

Animal (Kannada) [Deluxe Edition Album]
| No. | Title | Music | Singer(s) | Length |
|---|---|---|---|---|
| 7. | "Nanna Ravi Neene" | Harshavardhan Rameshwar | R. P. Krishaang | 5:25 |
| 8. | "Nooraru" (Soul Version) | Vishal Mishra | Adithya RK | 1:53 |
| 9. | "Appa Nee Nagu" (Extended Film Version) | Jaani | Anurag Kulkarni | 5:48 |
| Total length: | | | | 38:25 |

== Background score ==
Animal

Film score by Harshavardhan Rameshwar
- Released: 23 January 2024
- Genre: Film score
- Length: 40:47
- Language: Hindi
- Label: T-Series
External audio
- Animal (Original Motion Picture Soundtrack) on YouTube

The film further featured twenty-seven songs in the background score, that was released as a separate album on 23 January 2024 by T-Series. In the film, just before the interval, there is an action sequence where Ranvijay (played by Kapoor) wears headphones. As he fights, the background score features the Marathi song "Dolby Walya," (by Ajay-Atul) playing through his headphones.

| No. | Title | Length |
|---|---|---|
| 1. | "School Song" (Chorus) | 1:09 |
| 2. | "Pajero Chase" | 1:00 |
| 3. | "Rifle Warning" | 1:38 |
| 4. | "School Song" (Reunion) | 1:48 |
| 5. | "Alpha Male" | 1:10 |
| 6. | "Balbir Singh's Birthday" | 0:51 |
| 7. | "Jeeja Argument" | 1:24 |
| 8. | "Hospital Entry" | 1:29 |
| 9. | "Animal Theme" | 1:20 |
| 10. | "Tabbar Brothers Unite" | 1:38 |
| 11. | "Body Double's Deception" | 1:09 |
| 12. | "Range Rover Entry" | 1:24 |
| 13. | "Heading To Kill Jeeja" | 0:44 |
| 14. | "Killing Jeeja" | 1:04 |
| 15. | "Animal Title Music" | 1:22 |
| 16. | "Freddy's Introduction" | 0:59 |
| 17. | "Skull Fight Entry" | 1:03 |
| 18. | "Aatmanirbhar Bharat" | 2:24 |
| 19. | "Roaring War Machine" | 2:27 |
| 20. | "Salute The Champion" | 0:57 |
| 21. | "Angry Abrar" | 1:42 |
| 22. | "Irritated Abrar" | 0:38 |
| 23. | "Nude Walk" | 1:56 |
| 24. | "Zoya's Confession" | 3:07 |
| 25. | "Heading To Scotland" | 1:18 |
| 26. | "Animal Meeting Animal" | 0:52 |
| 27. | "Aziz's Introduction" | 4:08 |
| Total length: | | 40:47 |

== Reception ==
Umesh Punwani of Koimoi described the soundtrack as a "banger pro-max" album with "songs which will only get more significant after its release. It is an accomplished package balanced with romance, drama, and unmatched energy and everything a good set of headphones would only take up a notch". He rated four out of five to the album. Reviewing two of the songs from the soundtrack, for Film Companion, Lalitha Suhasini, stating for "Hua Main" said that "the song is driven by a clap beat, but the wailing guitar riff is where Pritam’s heart is at. The composer is a self-confessed rock buff and the line in the chorus 'Hua Main Ranjhana' is possibly where the song peaks and makes you want to play it all over again." She further added "Satranga" has the bittersweetness that provided an instant appeal similar to "Channa Mereya" from Ae Dil Hai Mushkil (2016), but added that "the melodies are so close, they could be missing pieces of the same puzzle". For the same website, listing the "best Indian film soundtracks", Sharanya Kumar listed Animal as the album is "packed with evocative songs".

Trisha Bhattacharya of India Today wrote "the album becomes an integral part of the storytelling process, mirroring the protagonist's journey through love, passion, heartbreak, and revenge. Each track is a musical brushstroke, painting the canvas of emotions with precision and finesse." Amit Vaidya of Rolling Stone India listed "Saari Duniya Jalaa Denge" and "Satranga" as one among their "Top 30 Hindi Film Songs of 2023". "Arjan Vailly" was listed by Sukanya Verma for Rediff.com and Devarsi Ghosh for Scroll.in on their year-ender lists; Ghosh described the song's use in the pre-interval sequence, "touches a high that the rest of Animal and the soundtrack are hard-pressed to capture".

Within its debut, the soundtrack became the top album globally on Apple Music, with eight of the songs topped the charts upon release. Three of its songs "Arjan Vailly", "Satranga" and "Saari Duniya Jalaa Denge" debuted at number 6, 7, 8 on the nationwide Spotify charts, with "Arjan Vailly" debuting globally for the week between 23 and 26 November.

== Accolades ==
| Award | Ceremony date | Category | Recipients | Result | Ref. |
|---|---|---|---|---|---|
| Filmfare Awards | 28 January 2024 | Best Music Director | Pritam, Vishal Mishra, Harshavardhan Rameshwar, Shreyas Puranik, Ashim Kemson, Bhupinder Babbal, Jaani | Won | |
| Filmfare Awards | 28 January 2024 | Best Lyricist | Siddharth–Garima – "Satranga" | Nominated | |
| Filmfare Awards | 28 January 2024 | Best Male Playback Singer | Arijit Singh – "Satranga" | Nominated | |
| Filmfare Awards | 28 January 2024 | Best Male Playback Singer | Bhupinder Babbal – "Arjan Vailly" | Won | |
| Filmfare Awards | 28 January 2024 | Best Background Score | Harshavardhan Rameshwar | Won | |
