= Do Deewane Seher Mein =

2026 Indian film by Ravi Udyawar

- Theatrical release poster
- Directed by: Ravi Udyawar
- Written by: Abhiruchi Chand
- Produced by: Sanjay Leela Bhansali; Prerna Singh; Umesh Kumar Bansal; Bharat Kumar Ranga
- Starring: Siddhant Chaturvedi; Mrunal Thakur
- Cinematography: Kaushal Shah
- Edited by: Monisha Baldawa
- Music by: Hesham Abdul Wahab; White Noise Collectives; Shreyas Puranik; Jaidev; Jackie Vanjari
- Production companies: Zee Studios; Rancorp Media; Bhansali Productions; Ravi Udyawar Films
- Distributed by: Pen Marudhar
- Release date: 20 February 2026
- Running time: 137 minutes
- Country: India
- Language: Hindi
- Budget: ₹30–50 crore
- Box office: est. ₹9.68 crore

Do Deewane Seher Mein (transl. Two lovers in the dawn) is a 2026 Indian Hindi-language romantic drama film written by Abhiruchi Chand and directed by Ravi Udyawar. The film is produced by Sanjay Leela Bhansali, Prerna Singh, Umesh Kumar Bansal, and Bharat Kumar Ranga under the Zee Studios, Rancorp Media and Bhansali Productions. It stars Siddhant Chaturvedi and Mrunal Thakur in the lead roles.

The film was released theatrically on 20 February 2026. The film received mixed reviews from critics.

== Plot ==
Shashank Sharma and Roshni Srivastava are perfect to the world but are battling inner imperfections, struggling with self-confidence through their lives. Shashank is scared of delivering speeches during presentations due to a speech impediment, preventing him from keeping up with his marketing job. On the other hand, Roshni feels underconfident due to her dusky complexion and the shape of her nose. She keeps rejecting marriage proposals.

One fine day, Shashank and Roshni meet in an arranged marriage setup. Initially, she refuses to marry Shashank, but he falls in love with her. Out of curiosity, he keeps visiting her workplace to find out the reason behind her refusal. After seeing his efforts, Roshni tells Shashank she refused to marry him because she feels she is not good-looking.

Shashank confesses his love to Roshni and tells her that he loves her the way she is. They eventually start dating each other but don’t inform their parents about it. Shashank’s father forces him to meet a girl, Sonia, for marriage. He goes to meet her without informing Roshni about it. Roshni eventually catches them at a cafe. Shashank tries to explain his side to Roshni by saying that he had already informed Sonia about their relationship. But Roshni refuses to listen to him and breaks ties with him.

Later, Roshni sees Shashank’s holiday reels on social media and decides to meet him. They bury their hatchets and reunite. During their courtship after engagement, they discover each other’s issues and decide to help overcome them. However, Roshni gets upset with Shashank when he asks her to remove the spectacles, as she looks good without them.

Eventually, Roshni's sister Naina tells her that her boyfriend judged her over her looks, but Shashank is different. He has accepted Roshni the way she is. Roshni realises her mistake and goes to reconcile with Shashank. On the other hand, Shashank has made up his mind to resign from his job, as he was asked to give a presentation on stage.

Roshni motivates him and asks him to overcome his fear. In the climax, Roshni removes her spectacles and goes to see Shashank’s presentation. Everyone applauds his efforts. They confess love to each other and get married.

== Cast ==
- Siddhant Chaturvedi as Shashank Sharma
- Mrunal Thakur as Roshni Shrivastava
- Ila Arun as Swati Rastogi, Kusum's mother
- Joy Sengupta as Adarsh Shrivastava, Roshni's father
- Ayesha Raza Mishra as Kusum Shrivastava, Roshni's mother
- Inesh Kotian as Bittu
- Sandeepa Dhar as Naina
- Deepraj Rana as Deepak Sharma, Shashank's father
- Mona Ambegaonkar as Sudha Sharma, Shashank's mother
- Achint Kaur as Mandy
- Naveen Kaushik as Shekhar
- Ajay Raju as Security Guard (at Roshni's office)
- Viraj Ghelani as Anil

== Production ==
=== Development and casting ===
The film was produced by Zee Studios and directed by Ravi Udyawar. The project was initially conceived as a contemporary take on urban isolation in Mumbai. In early 2025, it was announced that the lead roles would be played by an ensemble cast featuring rising stars from the independent film circuit alongside established actors.

=== Filming ===
Principal photography began in May 2025. The film was shot extensively on location in Mumbai and Navi Mumbai to capture the "gritty yet neon" aesthetic required for the narrative. Key locations included the Bandra-Worli Sea Link and various corporate hubs in Bandra Kurla Complex.

The cinematography, handled by Kaushal Shah, utilized the Arri Alexa 35 camera system to achieve a high dynamic range for the film's many night sequences. The production design was intentionally minimalist to reflect the emotional state of the lead characters.

== Music ==
Do Deewane Seher Mein

Soundtrack album by Hesham Abdul Wahab, White Noise Collectives, Shreyas Puranik, Jaidev and Jackie Vanjari
- Released: 10 February 2026
- Recorded: 2025
- Genre: Feature film soundtrack
- Length: 17:20
- Language: Hindi
- Label: Saregama
External audio
- Official Audio Jukebox on YouTube

The film's soundtrack was composed by Hesham Abdul Wahab, White Noise Collectives, Shreyas Puranik, Jaidev and Jackie Vanjari, with lyrics written by Abhiruchi Chand, Priya Saraiya, Kumaar and Gulzar. The music was described as a blend of "Lo-fi beats and contemporary Indian folk," designed to appeal to Gen Z audiences.

The first single "Aasma Aasma" was released on 22 January 2026.

The song “Do Deewane Seher Mein,” was taken from 1977 film “Gharaonda”, sung by Runa Laila, Bhupinder Singh, composed by Jaidev, Jackie Vanjari, with lyrics by Gulzar.

Track listing
| No. | Title | Lyrics | Music | Singer(s) | Length |
|---|---|---|---|---|---|
| 1. | "Aasma Aasma" | Abhiruchi Chand | Hesham Abdul Wahab | Jubin Nautiyal, Neeti Mohan | 3:38 |
| 2. | "Tera Mera Saath" | Priya Saraiya | White Noise Collectives | Sumedha Karmahe, Tushar Joshi | 4:02 |
| 3. | "Wajah Bewajah" | Kumaar | Shreyas Puranik | Vishal Mishra | 4:12 |
| 4. | "Do Deewane Seher Mein – Title Track" | Kumaar | Shreyas Puranik | Sonu Nigam, Aishwarya Bhandari | 2:57 |
| 5. | "Do Deewane Sheher Mein - Reprised" | Gulzar | Jaidev, Jackie Vanjari | Runa Laila, Bhupinder Singh | 2:41 |
| Total length: | | | | | 17:20 |

== Marketing ==
The film's date announcement was made on 21 November 2025.

== Release ==
The film was theatrical release on 20 February 2026.

=== Home media ===
The post-theatrical digital and satellite rights were acquired by Netflix. It premiered on Netflix on April 17, 2026.

== Reception ==
Amit Bhatia of ABP News gave the movie 3.5/5 stars saying "Siddhant Chaturvedi and Mrunal Thakur shine as a "perfectly imperfect" pair in the film", while also prasing the acting of others and also writing "he writing is engaging and relatable, making it easy to connect with the characters. The direction is effective, though a slightly tighter screenplay could have made the film even better." Ronak Katecha of The Times of India gave the film 3.5/5 stars, praising it, calling the story and portrayal of Mumbai as refreshing and wrote "Overall, Do Deewane Seher Mein doesn’t break new ground or provoke dramatic emotional highs, but it tenderly explores two individuals navigating their personal battles with insecurity and self-worth. What it does is, it quietly mirrors truths you already recognise — about yourself and about the people around you". Sana Farzeen of India Today gave the film 3/5 stars and wrote that explores a love story rooted in imperfections and emotional scars and "Performance-wise, Siddhant Chaturvedi and Mrunal Thakur carry the film with sincerity. Siddhant captures Shashank’s internalised insecurity with subtle restraint, while Mrunal brings quiet fragility to Roshni. Their chemistry feels organic."

Shubhra Gupta of The Indian Express gave 1.5 stars out of 5 and writes that "Siddhant Chaturvedi, Mrunal Thakur film makes you wonder how how can you expect passion in a film where the censors have excised ridiculous numbers of words from the mouths of adults?" Radhika Sharma of NDTV rated it 2/5 stars and said that "And, for a film preaching about self-acceptance, Do Deewane Seher Mein can't even use expletives, with terms like boobs muted out."

Lachmi Deb Roy of Firstpost gave 3 stars out of 5 and said that "Do Deewane Seher Mein at the end makes you believe that small budget movies can be entertaining too. And if you have ever been in love and your partner has loved you the way you are, this is a film that you will resonate with." Nandini Ramnath if Scroll.in observed that "It’s the kind of film that might puzzle the spectacles-wearing public that hasn’t had a problem finding partners."

Arpita Sarkar of OTT Play rated it 3/5 stars and said that "Do Deewane Seher Mein is a gentle, emotionally aware romance that chooses vulnerability over spectacle. In a cinematic landscape dominated by action and high drama, it dares to slow down and sit with insecurities, hesitations, and self-doubt. The film does not present love as a dramatic rescue mission, but rather as a silent process of unlearning and acceptance." Anuj Kumar of The Hindu said that "Siddhant Chaturvedi and Mrunal Thakur fail to rise above flimsy conflicts in this plodding romantic drama, devoid of passion."

Bollywood Hungama's critics gave 2.5/5 stars and writes that "DO DEEWANE SEHER MEIN is like a breath of fresh air. However, limited awareness and an ineffective soundtrack have resulted in minimal buzz."
