= Devil: The British Secret Agent =

2023 Indian film

- Theatrical release poster
- Directed by: Abhishek Nama; Naveen Medaram
- Written by: Srikanth Vissa
- Produced by: Abhishek Nama; Devansh Nama
- Starring: Nandamuri Kalyan Ram; Samyuktha; Vasishta N. Simha
- Cinematography: Soundararajan
- Edited by: Tammiraju
- Music by: Harshavardhan Rameshwar
- Production company: Abhishek Pictures
- Release date: 29 December 2023
- Running time: 144 minutes
- Country: India
- Language: Telugu

Devil: The British Secret Agent is a 2023 Indian Telugu-language action drama film written by Srikanth Vissa and directed by Abhishek Nama and Naveen Medaram. Produced by Abhishek Nama and Devansh Nama under Abhishek Pictures, it stars Nandamuri Kalyan Ram, Samyuktha, Vasishta N. Simha, Edward Sonnenblick and Elnaaz Norouzi.

Devil: The British Secret Agent was theatrically released in India on 29 December 2023 and received mixed reviews from critics.

== Plot ==
Set in 1945, during pre-independent India, Agent Devil follows the story of an officer working for the Indian Political Intelligence (IPI) who is sent undercover to investigate a murder in Rasapadu, a village under the Madras Presidency. The case revolves around the death of Vijaya, the daughter of a wealthy landlord. Vijaya's father is initially arrested as the primary suspect, with the motive being his shame over Vijaya's love affair with Bhuma, a domestic worker in their household. However, Agent Devil quickly begins to suspect that the landlord is innocent and that Vijaya's death is part of a larger conspiracy.

As the investigation progresses, Bhuma goes missing, and Rani, a cook in the household, is found dead. Bhuma is later discovered alive but is soon killed along with his father, Ramana, by an unknown assailant. Parallel to the investigation, Agent Devil develops feelings for Nyshadha, the landlord's niece, who is a London-educated barrister. Although initially hostile toward him, Nyshadha eventually reciprocates his feelings after he secures the landlord's acquittal in Vijaya's murder case.

Nyshadha, however, harbours secrets of her own. She and her companion, Samudra, are members of the Indian National Army (INA), led by Subhash Chandra Bose. Nyshadha reveals to Devil that a crucial code linking to the INA has been stolen, and they suspect it is related to Vijaya's murder. Devil learns that Bose is planning to return to India, with his landing location known only to Trivarna, Bose's close confidant whose identity is a mystery. Meanwhile, Clement, a British officer, is assassinated by Trivarna, who is revealed to be Manimekala, an Indian National Congress leader, as revenge for killing an INA agent.

Agent Devil's true mission in Rasapadu is gradually revealed: he was sent by the British to investigate Nyshadha after she decoded and transmitted a message about Bose's landing. The codes were leaked by Agent Trojan to General Kenneth Bracken, who then tasked Devil with tracking down Nyshadha. When the first part of the code, revealing the time and location of Bose's landing, is cracked, Bracken orders Nyshadha's execution, but Devil saves her. Devil convinces Bracken that Nyshadha needs to stay alive to deliver the final "All Clear" message to Trivarna, which is essential for Bose's safe landing.

Nyshadha is arrested but is later rescued by Devil, making her a fugitive. With a bounty on her head, she entrusts Devil with the task of contacting Trivarna. Devil sends a letter with the decoded message, which reaches Manimekala. Meanwhile, Shafi, a close ally of Trivarna, warns the INA that the code has been compromised, and they plan to change Bose's landing location.

Bracken eventually discovers that Manimekala is Trivarna. Devil brings her to Bracken, but in a surprising turn of events, he kills the soldiers tasked with executing her and reveals that he is the real Trivarna. Devil had joined the IPI on Bose's orders, not to investigate Nyshadha, but to identify Agent Trojan, the traitor who leaked the codes. Devil orchestrated Clement's assassination through Manimekala and had been protecting the INA's interests all along.

Devil finally uncovers that Samudra is Agent Trojan, an IPI agent who infiltrated the INA. Samudra had stolen the codes from Nyshadha's room and killed Vijaya when she caught him in the act. He later murdered Rani, who witnessed him covered in blood, and eventually killed Bhuma and Ramana. Samudra reveals Devil's identity to Bracken and takes Nyshadha to the location where Bose is expected to land, planning to betray the INA for a reward from the British. However, Nyshadha, informed by Devil's secret message, diverts Samudra and refuses to cooperate.

In the final showdown, Devil, as Trivarna, arrives at the location, single-handedly taking down Bracken's troops and killing both Bracken and Samudra. Before his death, Bracken learns that Devil, as a British secret agent, will continue to spy on the IPI and other agencies. Bose successfully lands in Mahabalipuram, a new "All Clear" location, and Trivarna, whose true identity remains a secret, resumes his work for the INA, hinting at the possibility of a sequel.

== Cast ==
- Nandamuri Kalyan Ram as Trivarna alias Agent Devil; a double agent spying on IPI; head of INA covert operations
- Vasishta N. Simha as INA agent Samudra alias Agent Trojan, a double agent spying on INA for IPI
- Samyuktha as INA Agent Nyshadha, Trivarna's love interest and INA's morse code operator
- Edward Sonnenblick as Bell, Bracken's trusted aid and close confidant.
- Elnaaz Norouzi as Rosy, a dancer and wife of Patwari
- Malvika Nair as INC politician Manimekala, and the leader of INA spies in South India, Right-hand woman to Trivarna
- Mark Bennington as Bracken, the chief of IPI unit in South India
- Satya as Sasthri, Trivarana's assistant and close confidant.
- Shafi as INA agent Shafi, who disguises himself as a press photographer, coordinates with members and INA; close confidant to Trivarna, Nyshadha, and Samudra
- Uttej as INA Agent Venkatachalam, who was tortured and killed by Bracken and Bell
- Ajay as Patwari, neighbour and business partner to Zamindar
- Srikanth Iyengar as Police Officer Maathaiya, a corrupt and negligent cop who initially investigates Vijaya's murder case.
- Ammu Abhirami as Vijaya, Zamindar's daughter
- Ester Noronha as Rani, a cook in the bungalow.
- Amit Sharma as Bhuma, Vijaya's love interest and a servant in the Zamindar's Bungalow
- Ananda Chakrapani as Ramana, Bhuma's father, a loyal servant to Zamindar
- Seetha as Vijaya's mother
- Nithin Mehta as Zamindar, Vijaya's father
- Chatrapathi Sekhar as Ramaiah, a lock smith
- Hari Teja as Servant to zamindar

== Production ==
The film was announced in July 2021. Initially, Yukti Thareja was considered as the female lead opposite Nandamuri Kalyan Ram. Later, she was replaced with Samyukhta Menon. Naveen Medaram, of Babu Baga Busy (2017) fame, was the initial director of the film and even shot for 105 days in Karaikudi, Visakhapatnam, and Hyderabad. However, owing to creative differences with the producer of the film, Abhishek Nama, he was dropped and Nama took over the duty of directing the remaining portions of the film, which was wrapped up in April 2023.

== Soundtrack ==
Devil: The British Secret Agent

Soundtrack album by Harshavardhan Rameshwar
- Released: 19 September 2023
- Genre: Film soundtrack
- Language: Telugu
- Label: ICON Music

Harshavardhan Rameshwar chronology
Animal (2023)	Devil: The British Secret Agent (2023)	Raju Yadav (2024)

The soundtrack album and film score of the film was composed by Harshavardhan Rameshwar. The music rights of the film were acquired by ICON Music. The first track from the album, "Maaye Chesi", released on 19 September 2023, followed by the second track, "This is Lady Rosy", on 27 November 2023, and followed by the third track, "Doorame Theeramai", on 18 December 2023.

Telugu
No.	Title	Lyrics	Singer(s)	Length
1.	"Maaye Chesi"	Satya RV	Sid Sriram	4:07
2.	"This is Lady Rosy"	Sri Harsha Emani	Raja Kumari	4:08
3.	"Doorame Theeramai"	Sandeep Bharadwaj	Sameera Bharadwaj	4:23

== Release ==
=== Theatrical ===
Devil: The British Secret Agent was expected to be released theatrically on 24 November 2023, but postponed to 29 December 2023.

=== Home media ===
The film premiered on Amazon Prime Video on 14 January 2024.

== Reception ==
Raghu Bandi of Indian Express gave 1.5/5 stars and wrote "Kalyan Ram is sincere in a film lacking originality or depth. Devil is strictly for fans of the actor." Abhilasha Cherukuri of Cinema Express gave the film 2.5/5 stars and wrote "Nandamuri Kalyanram's latest outing is a genre-friendly yet overdrawn tale of Independence-era heroism." Suresh Rachamalla of News18 gave 3/5 stars and praised its story, cast performances and production values, but criticized its first half and songs. Suhas Sistu of The Hans India gave 3/5 stars and wrote ""Devil" is a watchable period action drama featuring an interesting storyline and commendable twists. The lack of a gripping first half prevents the movie from reaching its full potential. However, if viewers can overlook some minor flaws, the film offers an engaging experience, making it worth a try." Neeshitha Nyayapati of Hindustan Times wrote "Devil turns out to be yet another Telugu film that tries way too hard to seem cool while pulling off a tale of espionage. Irrespective of who directed the film, the off-screen drama seems way more interesting than the on-screen one."
