= Gangubai Kathiawadi (soundtrack) =

Gangubai Kathiawadi (Original Motion Picture Soundtrack)

Soundtrack album by Sanjay Leela Bhansali
- Released: 18 February 2022
- Recorded: 2021
- Studio: Sonic Bliss Studio; Wow & Flutter Studios; Legato Labz; OpenReel Studios
- Genre: Feature film soundtrack
- Length: 45:20
- Language: Hindi; Telugu
- Label: Saregama Music

Sanjay Leela Bhansali chronology
Malaal (2019)	Gangubai Kathiawadi (Original Motion Picture Soundtrack) (2022)	Heeramandi (2024)
External audio
- Gangubai Kathiawadi - Full Album on YouTube

Gangubai Kathiawadi (Original Motion Picture Soundtrack) is the soundtrack album to the 2022 film of the same name, directed and produced by Sanjay Leela Bhansali and starring Alia Bhatt in the titular role. The film was loosely based on the life of Indian sex worker and social activist Gangubai Kothewali and documented in the novel Mafia Queens of Mumbai, written by S. Hussain Zaidi. Besides directing, Bhansali also composed the film's soundtrack while the score was composed by Sanchit Balhara and Ankit Balhara. The lyrics for the songs were written by Kumaar, A. M. Turaz and Bhojak Ashok "Anjam". The album was released under the Saregama record label on 18 February 2022 with a simultaneous Telugu version which had lyrics written by Chaitanya Prasad.

== Background ==
Gangubai Kathiawadi is Bhansali's sixth film as a composer. Like all of his earlier films, Bhansali would curate the tunes after reading the script owing to his belief on music that would be expressed in certain moments over dialogues. The soundtrack accompanied mostly female singers except for one song, while Bhansali also introduced Janhvi Shrimankar and Archana Gore in their playback debuts as they rendered two songs for the film. The musical palette accompanied the use of traditional instrumentation that served the multitude of genres such as Indian folk, qawwali and Indian classical music. It was recorded during the COVID-19 pandemic lockdown in 2021 where the musicians had to work remotely. The album was arranged by Shail Hada and Raja Pandit, with music production handled by Jackie Vanjari and programmed by Sanjay Jaipurwale and Shivansh Kapil.

In April 2021, Bhansali had signed a long-term partnership contract with Saregama India Ltd. which allowed the label to collaborate with three projects, including Gangubai Kathiawadi. This initiative eventually marked the label's return to film music acquisition after six years, where it had paid ₹20 crore (US$2.4 million) for the music rights. Bhansali cited this as a special and personal collaboration which he attributed to listening the "golden classics of Hindi cinema" which the label's music catalogue holds, in his formative years, that had shaped his storytelling and worldbuilding.

== Release ==
The first single from the album "Dholida" was released on 10 February 2022. It is a garda dance number set in the backdrop of Navaratri festival and was choreographed by Kruti Mahesh. The second single "Jab Saiyaan" was released in conjunction with Valentine's Day (14 February). The album was released on 18 February 2022 in Hindi and Telugu languages. Post release, the music video of the song "Meri Jaan" was unveiled on 21 February. It was followed by the videos for the song, "Jhume Re Gori" on 25 February, and "Shikayat" on 9 March.

== Reception ==
In his review for Film Companion, Prathyush Parasuraman summarized that "the songs of Gangubai Kathiawadi move quickly between genres of feeling. You cannot listen to it as a single mood piece neatly transitioning, like you would for his longer albums." Anish Mohanty in his review for Planet Bollywood stated that "With Gangubai Kathiawadi, Sanjay Leela Bhansali shows some growth as a composer. Unlike the albums he has put together in the past, it consistently engaging and does not really offer a dull moment." Lakshmi Govindarajan Javeri in her review for Firstpost stated "the poignant ones are leaps ahead of the dance numbers even though the latter will command more airplay [...] Listen to the album for what Bhansali is not projecting: the underlining sensitivity of human emotions."

Monika Rawal Kukreja of Hindustan Times wrote "Meri Jaan and Jab Saiyaan are soft romantic tracks while Dholida and Jhume Re Gori let you groove to some peppy folk beats." Sneha Bengani of CNBC TV18 compared the music and score to that of Spencer (2021) that "elevates the narrative, makes it river-like—free-flowing, uncontainable, with a life of its own." Shilajit Mitra of Cinema Express wrote "'Dholia' and 'Jhume Re Gori' are nods to earlier songs, though there's much invention to the lush, entertaining 'Meri Jaan'." Ronak Kotecha of The Times of India, however wrote, "Each song is masterfully and colourfully picturised [...] but none of the songs, other than Dholida, are too memorable."

== Track listing ==
Gangubai Kathiawadi (Original Motion Picture Soundtrack) Hindi version track listing
No.	Title	Lyrics	Singer(s)	Length
1.	"Meri Jaan"	Kumaar	Neeti Mohan	3:58
2.	"Dholida"	Kumaar, Bhojak Ashok "Anjam"	Janhvi Shrimankar, Shail Hada	2:59
3.	"Jab Saiyaan"	A. M. Turaz	Shreya Ghoshal	4:07
4.	"Shikayat"	A. M. Turaz	Archana Gore	4:09
5.	"Muskurahat"	A. M. Turaz	Arijit Singh	4:37
6.	"Jhume Re Gori"	Kumaar	Archana Gore, Tarannum Jain, Dipti Rege, Aditi Pradhudesai	2:50
Total length:				22:40

All lyrics are written by Chaitanya Prasad.

Gangubai Kathiawadi (Original Motion Picture Soundtrack) Telugu version track listing
No.	Title	Singer(s)	Length
1.	"Meri Jaan – Telugu"	Neeti Mohan	3:58
2.	"Dhole Ra"	Uma Neha, Saketh Komanduri	2:59
3.	"Chelikaade"	Deepthi Parthasarathy	4:07
4.	"Sukhamulone Untu"	Kalpana Raghavender	4:09
5.	"Navvunu Aapaku"	Vijay Prakash	4:37
6.	"Aadene Pori"	Sahithi Komanduri, P. Sathya Yamini, Harini Ivaturi, Aswhini Chepuri, V. Pavani	2:50
Total length:			22:40

== Personnel ==
Credits adapted from Saregama:

Production and technical

- Music composer – Sanjay Leela Bhansali
- Music producer – Jackie Vanjari
- Arrangements – Shail Hada, Raja Pandit
- Programming – Sanjay Jaipurwale, Shivansh Kapil
- Recording – Kunal Dabholkar, Vatsal Patel, Tanay Gajjar
- Studios – Sonic Bliss, Wow & Flutter, Legato Labz, OpenReel
- Mixing and mastering – Kunal Dabholkar
- Dolby Atmos mixing – Subhadeep Mitra
- Musical assistance – Swapnish Jadhav
- Music associates – Shail Hada, Shreyas Puranik, Raja Pandit

Musicians

- Rhythm – Raju Sardar, Sanjiv Sen, Prashant Sonagra
- Percussions – Raju Sardar, Prashant Sonagra, Narendra Gangni, Sanjiv Sen
- Tabla, dholak – Prashant Sonagra, Narendra Gangni
- Urdu dholak – Sanjiv Sen
- Horns, saxophone – ID Rao
- Bass guitar – Rutvik Talashilkar, Shomu Seal
- Acoustic guitar – Shomu Seal
- Strokes – Tapas Roy
- Sitar - Bhagirath Bhatt, Ananya Wadkar
- Banjo, harmonium – Pradeep Pandit
- Violin – Abhijit Mazumdar, Kailash Patra
- Sarangi – Momin Khan Niyazi
- Shehnai – Raju Dhumal
- Bhungal – Arvind Nayak, Mahendra Nayak
- Kansi joda – Vinu Nayak, Jayanti Nayak
- Manjira – Anand B Parmar
- Chorus – Tarannum Malik, Aditi Paul, Kalpana, Dipti, Ruchna, Pragti, Archana, Arohi

== Accolades ==
Accolades for Gangubai Kathiawadi (Original Motion Picture Soundtrack)
Award	Date of the ceremony	Category	Recipients	Result	Ref.
Filmfare Awards	27 April 2023	Best Music Director	Sanjay Leela Bhansali	Nominated	
Filmfare Awards	27 April 2023	Best Lyricist	A. M. Turaz for "Jab Saiyaan"	Nominated	
Filmfare Awards	27 April 2023	Best Female Playback Singer	Janhvi Shrimankar for "Dholida"	Nominated	
Filmfare Awards	27 April 2023	Best Female Playback Singer	Shreya Ghoshal for "Jab Saiyaan"	Nominated	
Filmfare Awards	27 April 2023	R. D. Burman Award	Janhvi Shrimankar for "Dholida"	Won	
Filmfare Awards	27 April 2023	Best Background Score	Sanchit Balhara, Ankit Balhara	Won	
International Indian Film Academy Awards	26–27 May 2023	Best Music Director	Sanjay Leela Bhansali	Nominated	
International Indian Film Academy Awards	26–27 May 2023	Best Lyricist	A. M. Turaz for "Jab Saiyaan"	Nominated	
International Indian Film Academy Awards	26–27 May 2023	Best Female Playback Singer	Shreya Ghoshal for "Jab Saiyaan"	Nominated	
Mirchi Music Awards	3 November 2023	Album of the Year (Listeners' Choice)	Gangubai Kathiawadi	Nominated	
Mirchi Music Awards	3 November 2023	Song of the Year (Listeners' Choice)	"Dholida"	Nominated	
Mirchi Music Awards	3 November 2023	Album of the Year	Gangubai Kathiawadi	Nominated	
Mirchi Music Awards	3 November 2023	Song of the Year	"Jab Saiyaan"	Nominated	
Mirchi Music Awards	3 November 2023	Song of the Year	"Dholida"	Nominated	
Mirchi Music Awards	3 November 2023	Female Vocalist of the Year	Shreya Ghoshal for "Jab Saiyaan"	Won	
Mirchi Music Awards	3 November 2023	Female Vocalist of the Year	Neeti Mohan for "Meri Jaan"	Nominated	
Mirchi Music Awards	3 November 2023	Female Vocalist of the Year	Janhvi Shrimankar for "Dholida"	Nominated	
Mirchi Music Awards	3 November 2023	Music Composer of the Year	Sanjay Leela Bhansali	Won	
Mirchi Music Awards	3 November 2023	Lyricist of the Year	A. M. Turaz for "Jab Saiyaan"	Nominated	
Mirchi Music Awards	3 November 2023	Best Song Producer – Programming & Arranging	Shail Hada for "Jab Saiyaan"	Nominated	
Mirchi Music Awards	3 November 2023	Best Song Producer – Programming & Arranging	Shail Hada for "Dholida"	Nominated	
Mirchi Music Awards	3 November 2023	Best Song Engineer – Recording & Mixing	Tanay Gajjar, Kunal Dabholkar for "Jab Saiyaan"	Nominated	
Mirchi Music Awards	3 November 2023	Best Background Music Score	Sanchit Balhara, Ankit Balhara	Nominated	
Zee Cine Awards	26 February 2023	Best Music Director	Sanjay Leela Bhansali	Nominated	
Zee Cine Awards	26 February 2023	Best Lyricist	A. M. Turaz for "Jab Saiyaan"	Nominated	
Zee Cine Awards	26 February 2023	Best Female Playback Singer	Shreya Ghoshal for "Jab Saiyaan"	Nominated	
Reel Awards	26 February 2023	Best Music	Sanjay Leela Bhansali	Nominated	
Reel Awards	26 February 2023	Best Female Playback Singer	Neeti Mohan for "Meri Jaan"	Nominated	
