= Good Bad Girl (TV series) =

Indian Hindi language comedy-drama web-series

- Genre: Drama
- Created by: Vikas Bahl & Chaitally Parmar
- Written by: Tahira Nath; Nikhil Arora; Kalyani Pandit; Aarti Kapoor & Chaitally Parmar
- Directed by: Abhishek Sengupta
- Starring: Samridhi Dewan; Vaibhav Raj; Gul Panag
- Music by: Sahej & Sarvesh
- Country of origin: India
- Original language: Hindi
- No. of seasons: 1
- No. of episodes: 9

Production
- Producers: Vikas Bahl; Anurag Shrivastava; Viraj Sawant; Varun Khandelwal
- Editor: Kunal Walve

Original release
- Network: SonyLIV
- Release: 14 October 2022

Good Bad Girl is an Indian Hindi language comedy-drama web-series based on the journey of Maya Ahuja, a lawyer who finds creative ways of getting out of trouble. The show stars Samridhi Dewan as the protagonist along with Vaibhav Raj Gupta, Gul Panag, Sheeba Chaddha and Rajendra Sethi and is directed by Abhishek Sen Gupta and produced by Vikas Bahl and Anuraag Srivastava.

The show is now streaming exclusively on Sony LIV.

== Cast ==
- Samridhi Dewan as Maya/Mayo
- Vaibhav Raj Gupta as Sahil Mistry
- Gul Panag as Zaina Mistry
- Zain Khan Durrani as Prithvi Banerjee
- Soham Majumdar as Dr. Punit Kamble
- Aradhya Aanjna as Young Maya a.k.a. Bulbul
- Rajendra Sethi as Raman Ahuja
- Sheeba Chaddha as Nimmi Ahuja
- Namrata Sheth as Jhilmil Lohia
- Aarush Thakur as Ashwin
- Shayank Shukla as Jamsmeet Kaul-MLA

== Synopsis ==
It's the story of a middle-class girl, Maya Ahuja, who as a young child, experiences societal pressure to speak properly and draw the line between truth and lies. As she gets older, she learns that lying is the only way to accomplish her goals. An adult Maya is put in a difficult situation when she learns that she might lose her job. In such a scenario, deception would be her safe haven.

== Episodic Synopsis ==
| Episode No. | Episode Title | Episodic synopsis | Date of release |
|---|---|---|---|
| 1 | Probably May be | Young Maya, a.k.a. Bulbul is confronted by her mother for bad-mouthing a neighbour, which leaves her confused and agitated. In the present, an adult Maya visits her doctor and then heads to the court. She is confronted by her boss, Zaina, for a screw-up at work and is on the verge of losing her job. | 14 October 2022 |
| 2 | Lies will set you free | The news of Maya's having cancer has spread throughout her office, with her employers ready to support her. A teen Maya finds ways to impress the popular girl, Jhilmil. After many good-bad attempts, the two become friends. Maya finds out a dirty secret about Sahil, her coworker, and intends to leverage it against him. | 14 October 2022 |
| 3 | Game Shame | Mayo starts a side hustle and uses it to impress Jhilmil's mates. Maya and Sahil are on each other's tails as they have something to use against each other. She runs into an old acquaintance, Aanchal, who she doesn't like, and Bulbul has a bully. | 14 October 2022 |
| 4 | Double Trouble | Maya gets a fresh start by having people on her side, while Sahil is cornered by everyone. Good things are happening to her, and she is now a celebrity. Meanwhile, Bulbul is having twice the fun now. Jhilmil shares the problems of her private life with Mayo. | 14 October 2022 |
| 5 | Home- Sick | Maya, Mayo, and Bulbul are all at home for their birthday. While Maya reconnects with her family after a long time, Bulbul strikes back at her bully. Mayo had better plans for the day, but ultimately, things turned ugly. | 14 October 2022 |
| 6 | Plan B | Mayo gets a new home where she can be herself. Bulbul shares her good and bad experiences with her friend Ashwin. Although Maya gets new opportunities and gets over everyone's mind, she's soon brought back to her senses. | 14 October 2022 |
| 7 | Maya Maya Pants on Fire | Mayo gets a new home where she can be herself. Bulbul shares her good and bad experiences with her friend Ashwin. Although Maya gets new opportunities and gets over everyone's mind, she's soon brought back to her senses. | 14 October 2022 |
| 8 | Play Dirty | While Maya comes out clean, Sahil finds out more about her past. Zaina tries to confront and take her out of the scene, but she bounces back with a clever move. There are some shocking revelations about Mayo. | 14 October 2022 |
| 9 | Catch Maya If you can | After many years, Maya finally enjoys a heartfelt reunion with her family. Things go down for Mayo as she and her friends fall into grave trouble that causes irreparable damage. Finally, Sahil devises a plan to attack Maya. | 14 October 2022 |
