= Pataligunjer Putul Khela =

2025 Indian Bengali comedy film

- Theatrical release poster
- Directed by: Subhankar Chattopadhyay
- Screenplay by: Iman Chakraborty; Subhankar Chattopadhyay
- Story by: Iman Chakraborty
- Dialogues by: Iman Chakraborty
- Produced by: Kushagra Jalan
- Starring: Paran Bandyopadhyay; Soham Majumdar; Ditipriya Roy
- Cinematography: Gopi Bhagat
- Edited by: Subhojit Singha
- Music by: Subhadeep Guha
- Production company: Jalan Productions
- Distributed by: Jalan Distributors
- Release date: January 10, 2025
- Running time: 140 minutes
- Country: India
- Language: Bengali

Pataligunjer Putul Khela (transl. The Puppet Play of Pataligunj) is a 2025 Indian Bengali political satire film directed by Subhankar Chattopadhyay. Written by Chattopadhyay along with Iman Chakraborty, the film has been produced by Kushagra Jalan under the banner of Jalan Productions. Paran Bandyopadhyay, Soham Majumdar and Ditipriya Roy in the lead roles while Dipankar De, Rajatava Dutta and Manasi Sinha play other pivotal roles.

The film is about a puppeteer whose family gets caught in a tussle between financial hardship and politics when a local leader takes an interest in his wife. The trailer was revealed on 3 January 2025. The soundtrack of the film has been composed by Subhadeep Guha. Gopi Bhagat did the cinematography while Subhojit Singha handled the editing. The film was released in the theatres on 10 January 2025.

== Synopsis ==
The film is about Gopal Mukherjee, a young man from Pataligunj, who earns a living by performing puppet shows. His work brings in little money. So, he and his father Saibal Mukherjee are largely depend on Shaibal's pension. They often argue over their uncertain livelihood.

One day, while performing at a village fair, Gopal meets Rai and falls in love with her. With the advice of his spiritual teacher, Shaibal arranges Gopal's marriage to Rai. After Rai moves to Pataligunj, local political leader Subodh Mal selects her as a candidate for the upcoming assembly election. The opposition party responds by fielding Gopal against her.

As the election campaign gathers pace, the couple finds their personal life drawn into the political rivalry. A television journalist also visits the village to closely follow the vote preparations. The election affects both their families, as the people of Pataligunj find themselves caught between their personal relationships and political loyalties.

== Cast ==
- Soham Majumdar as Gopal Mukherjee, a puppeteer
- Ditipriya Roy as Rai Mukherjee, Gopal's wife
- Paran Bandyopadhyay as Saibal Mukherjee, Gopal's father
- Dipankar De as Saibal's Gurudev
- Rajatava Dutta as Subodh Mal, a local political leader
- Manasi Sinha as Goapl's mother
- Tanima Sen as Rai's mother
- Subrata Guha Roy
- Pradip Dhar
- Debapratim Dasgupta
- Sumit Sammadar as Sadhan Sarkar, Gopal's neighbour

== Reception ==
Debarshi Banerjee of Anandabazar Patrika rated the film 6/10 stars and wrote "This film talks about the unity of domestic politics and foreign politics. It says it in a funny way." He praised the direction, the social message delivered and the performance of the lead cast but bemoaned the forced comedy in the second half and the impractical social scenario shown regarding Rai's divorce.

Parama Dasgupta of Aajkal reviewed the film and opined "A simple story with simple characters. Subhankar Chattopadhyay's film captivates the heart with its friendly smile." She appreciated the simple storyline, the presence of various emotions, the usage of political satire in social comedy, the performance of all the actors, the music, the songs' placement and Iman Chakraborty's witty dialogues but bemoaned the excessive comedy in certain sequences and excessive emotion in some scenes.

Upasana Roy of Sangbad Pratidin reviewed the film and worded "Pataligunjer Putul Khela has tried it its best to deliver a lot of things within the limited timespan." She applauded the performance of all the actors — particularly Paran's seasoned acting and Ditipriya's comic timing, the music and the cinematography but criticized the melodrama, weak character writing, below par screenplay, weak chemistry between Gopal and Rai, the stretched ending and the forced comedy in every dialogue.
