= Soham Majumdar =

Indian actor (born 1993)

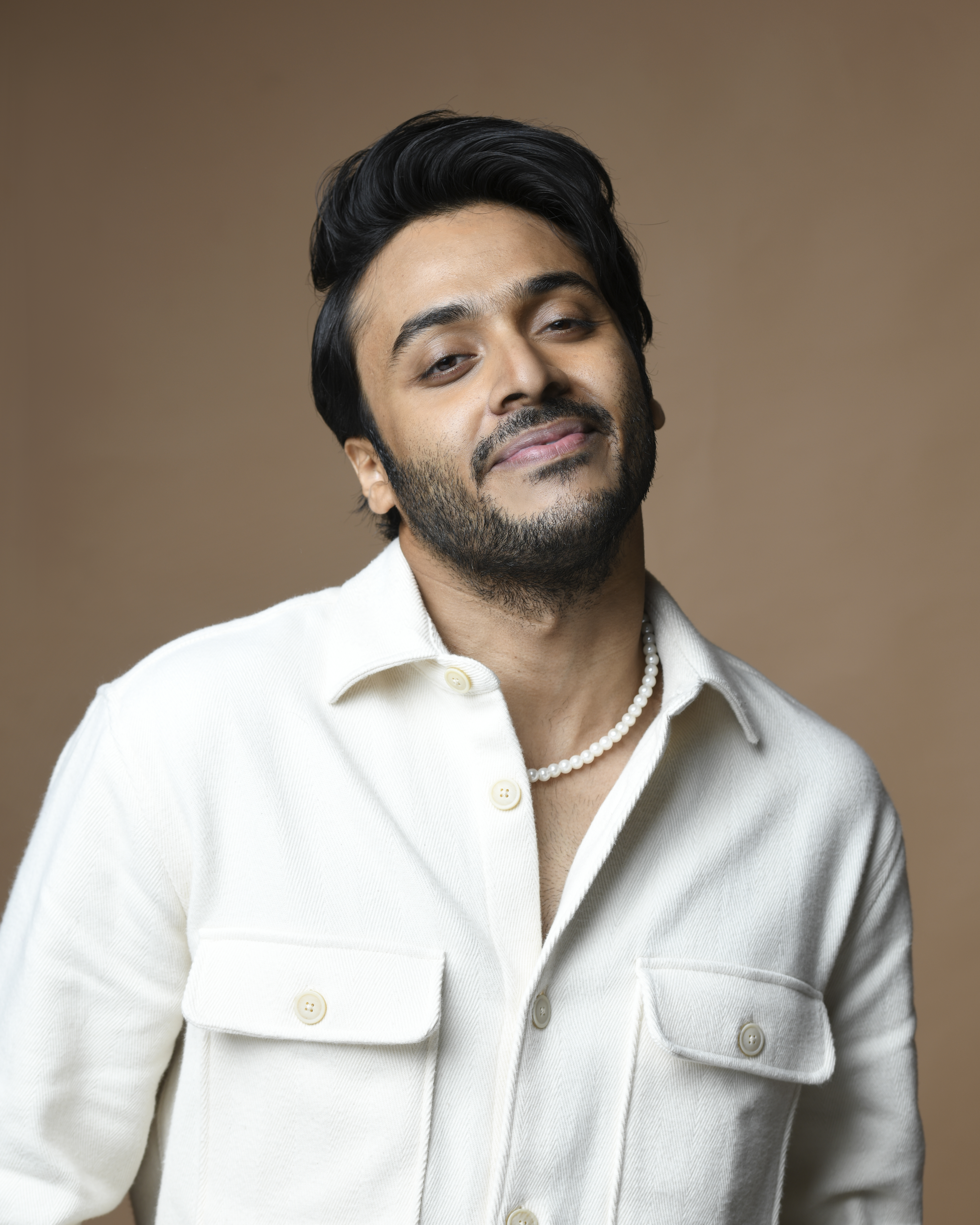
- Born: 4 April 1993 (age 33); Calcutta, West Bengal, India
- Education: Institute of Engineering and Management
- Occupation: Actor
- Years active: 2011–present
- Known for: Kabir Singh; Brahma Janen Gopon Kommoti; Dilkhush

Soham Majumdar (born 4 April 1993) is an Indian actor who works primarily in Bengali cinema and Hindi cinema. He began his career in theatre and made his film debut with Kaushik Ganguly's Bengali film Drishtikone (2018).

Majumdar gained wider recognition with his performance as Shiva, the friend of the titular character in the Hindi film Kabir Singh (2019). He subsequently played his first lead role in the Bengali film Brahma Janen Gopon Kommoti (2020).

== Early life and theatre ==
Majumdar was born on 4 April 1993 in Calcutta, West Bengal to Saibal Majumdar and Nandita Majumdar. He completed his schooling from Don Bosco School in Park Circus, Calcutta. After that, he pursued an engineering degree from the Institute of Engineering and Management in Salt Lake City in Calcutta.

== Career ==
=== 2011–2017: Theatre and early career ===
Majumdar began his acting career in theatre and subsequently became involved with the Kolkata theatre scene. In 2011, he founded the theatre group Mad About Drama (MAD), through which he participated in and directed theatrical productions. In an interview with The Telegraph, he said that his experience in theatre influenced his subsequent approach towards acting and helped establish his career as an actor. Majumdar also appeared in the stage musical Aladdin, produced by Disney and BookMyShow.

=== 2018–2020: Film debut and breakthrough ===
Majumdar made his feature film debut with the Kaushik Ganguly directorial Drishtikone in 2018. He had previously directed a theatre production in which Ganguly's son Ujaan Ganguly had performed. Kaushik Ganguly noticed his performance and direction, and subsequently offered Majumdar a role in Drishtikone.

In 2019, Majumdar appeared in the Hindi film Kabir Singh, directed by Sandeep Reddy Vanga. He played the role of Shiva, the protagonist's friend. This performance brought him wider recognition in Hindi cinema.

In 2020, he made his Bengali film debut as the male lead with Brahma Janen Gopon Kommoti, directed by Aritra Mukherjee. The film was screened in the Indian Panorama feature film category at the 51st International Film Festival of India in 2021.

=== 2021–present: Continued film and television work ===
In 2021, Majumdar played Anand Mhata in Dhamaka, directed by Ram Madhvani. In 2022, he appeared in the SonyLIV original web series Good Bad Girl. In 2023, Majumdar appeared in the Bengali romantic comedy Dilkhush, directed by Rahoul Mukherjiee. Majumdar continued to work in Hindi productions including Pippa (2023), Sajini Shinde Ka Viral Video (2023), Dukaan (2024) and Sky Force (2025). He also appeared in the Hindi-language web series Citadel: Honey Bunny (2024).

In 2025, he appeared in the Bengali film Pataligunjer Putul Khela and the web series Bibhishon. In 2026, Majumdar played the male lead in the Bengali horror-comedy film Bhanupriya Bhooter Hotel, directed by Aritra Mukherjee.

== Filmography ==
Key
| † | Denotes films that have not yet been released |

| Year | Film | Language | Role | Note | Ref. |
|---|---|---|---|---|---|
| 2018 | Drishtikone | Bengali | Avik | Feature film debut | |
| 2019 | Kabir Singh | Hindi | Shiva Majumdar | Debut in Hindi feature film | |
| 2020 | Brahma Janen Gopon Kommoti | Bengali | Bikramaditya | First time playing the lead role in a feature film | |
| 2020 | Banobas | Bengali | Asish | Short film; Released on the YouTube handle of Windows Production | |
| 2021 | Dhamaka | Hindi | Anand Mhata / Raghubeer Mhata | | |
| 2022 | #Homecoming | Bengali | Godot | Released directly on SonyLIV on 18 February 2022 | |
| 2023 | Tarokar Mrityu | Bengali | —N/a | | |
| 2023 | Dilkhush | Bengali | Rishi | | |
| 2023 | Sajini Shinde Ka Viral Video | Hindi | Siddhant Kadam | | |
| 2023 | Pippa | Hindi | Anirban Mukherjee | | |
| 2024 | Dukaan | Hindi | Armaan | | |
| 2025 | Sky Force | Hindi | Debashish "Cockroach" Chatterjee | | |
| 2025 | Pataligunjer Putul Khela | Bengali | Gopal Mukherjee | | |
| 2026 | Bhanupriya Bhooter Hotel | Bengali | Shaon Mitra, an advocate | | |
| 2026 | Maya Satya Bhram | Bengali | Sub-Inspector Sanjay Konar | | |
| 2026 | Shakti Shalini † | Hindi | TBA | | |
| 2026 | Poroborti Station Begunkodar † | Bengali | Dr. Nayan Mukherjee | | |

== Web series ==
| Year | Series | Role | OTT platform | Language | Notes | Ref. |
|---|---|---|---|---|---|---|
| 2022 | Rangbaaz: Darr Ki Rajneeti | Dipu | Zee5 | Hindi | Season 3 of Rangbaaz | |
| 2022 | Good Bad Girl | Dr. Punit Kamble | SonyLIV | Hindi | | |
| 2024 | Citadel: Honey Bunny | Ludo | Amazon Prime Video | Hindi | Spin-off to the American web series Citadel. | |
| 2025 | Rangbaaz: The Bihar Chapter | Dipu | Zee5 | Hindi | Season 4 of Rangbaaz | |
| 2025 | Bibhishon | Sub-Inspector Bidhan Sen | Zee5 | Bengali | Marked his first time playing the lead role in a web series | |

== Accolades ==
List of awards and nominations
| Year | Award | Ceremony | Category | Film | Result | Ref. |
|---|---|---|---|---|---|---|
| 2019 | Screen Awards | 26th Screen Awards | Screen Award for Best Supporting Actor | Kabir Singh | Nominated | |
| 2020 | Zee Cine Awards | 20th Zee Cine Awards | Zee Cine Award for Best Actor in a Supporting Role – Male | Kabir Singh | Won | |
