= Heeramandi (soundtrack) =

Heeramandi (Original Motion Picture Soundtrack)
- Soundtrack album cover

Soundtrack album by Sanjay Leela Bhansali
- Released: 24 April 2024
- Recorded: 2021–2023
- Studio: Studio 504; Sonic Bliss Studio
- Genre: Feature film soundtrack
- Length: 32:40
- Language: Hindi
- Label: Bhansali Music

Sanjay Leela Bhansali chronology
Sukoon (2022)	Heeramandi (Original Motion Picture Soundtrack) (2024)
External audio
- Heeramandi - Full Album on YouTube

Heeramandi (Original Motion Picture Soundtrack) is the soundtrack album to the 2024 television series of the same name created by Sanjay Leela Bhansali, who also composed its soundtrack. The album featured nine songs written by A. M. Turaz, and adaptation of traditional songs. Preceded by three singles, the album was released on 24 April 2024 under the Bhansali Music label.

== Development ==
The soundtrack to Heeramandi featured nine songs composed by the series' creator-showrunner Sanjay Leela Bhansali. A. M. Turaz was the prominent songwriter, who collaborated with Bhansali on his previous works. Bhansali further adapted the song "Sakal Ban" written by 13th century poet Amir Khusro, and two folk numbers "Phool Gendwa Na Maaro" composed by Roshan and written by Sahir Ludhianvi for the film Dooj Ka Chand (1964) and "Nazariya Ki Maari" composed by Naushad for Pakeezah (1972).

The songs were performed by Shreya Ghoshal, Madhubanti Bagchi, Aditi Paul, Shikha Joshi, Barnali Chattopadhyay, Kalpana Gandharva, Sharmistha Chatterjee amongst others. The only male singer being involved in the soundtrack was Raja Hasan who performed "Sakal Ban".

Bagchi met Bhansali at his office where the latter played him numerous songs under his vocals where "Nazariya Ki Maari" served as a standout and which Bhansali wanted the song to be rendered by her. Classical singer Barnali Chattopadhyay performed two songs for the series: "Saiyaan Hatto Jaao" and "Phool Gendwa Na Maaro". Kalpana Gandharva performed the song "Ek Baar Dekh Lijiye", who described it as a "dream come true" moment on singing for Bhansali. After a 45-minute session with Bhansali, she was provided the lyrics and music and realized the potential of the song as she began harmonizing and singing. Despite hesitations, she decided to sing the duet as she did not want to miss the opportunity.

== Release ==
In March 2024, Bhansali launched his music label Bhansali Music as a subsidiary of Bhansali Productions with Heeramandi's soundtrack being the label's maiden release. The song "Sakal Ban" was released as the first single from the album on International Women's Day (8 March 2024). The launch coincided with the cast being present on the global stage of Miss World 2023. The Indian Express reviewed that the visuals were reminiscent of "Deewani Mastani" from Bhansali's Bajirao Mastani (2015). The second single "Tilasmi Bahein", a dance number featuring Sonakshi Sinha, was released on 4 April 2024.

The third single "Azadi" was released on 23 April.

== Reception and impact ==
Girish Wankhede of Bollywood Town wrote "While the series will always be discussed and weighed over its texts and subtexts, the music album stands out for the sheer genius of Sanjay Leela Bhansali." A reviewer from PeepingMoon wrote "With each note, Bhansali's musical masterpiece continues to leave an indelible mark on the hearts of audiences worldwide." Joginder Tuteja of Bollywood Hungama gave a mixed review stating "Sanjay Leela Bhansali's music is soulful but won't have a huge shelf life." Nandini Ramnath of Scroll.in wrote "The music, also by Bhansali, falls flat". Pratikshya Mishra of The Quint wrote "While the songs don't feel 'new', they're not wasted in the show – every song reveals something about a character or arc to come".

Audience response to the songs, however, were extremely positive with the songs topping music charts. The song "Saiyaan Hatto Jaao" went viral with Aditi Rao Hydari's "gajagamini walk" being recreated in social media. The song "Sakal Ban" was featured at the Royal College of Music museum exhibition as a part of the seminar Awaken: Sufi Music and Women of South Asia.

== Track listing ==
Heeramandi (Original Motion Picture Soundtrack) track listing
No.	Title	Lyrics	Singer(s)	Length
1.	"Tilasmi Bahein"	A. M. Turaz	Sharmistha Chatterjee	2:19
2.	"Sakal Ban"	Amir Khusro	Raja Hasan	2:30
3.	"Azadi"	A. M. Turaz	Archana Gore, Pragati Joshi, Aditi Prabhudesai, Arohi, Aditi Paul, Tarannum Malik Jain, Dipti Rege	3:53
4.	"Chaudhavi Shab (Raga Yaman Kalyan)"	A. M. Turaz	Shreya Ghoshal	4:03
5.	"Masoom Dil Hai Mera"	A. M. Turaz	Shikha Joshi	3:56
6.	"Phool Gendwa Na Maaro"	Sahir Ludhianvi	Barnali Chattopadhyay	3:13
7.	"Saiyaan Hatto Jaao"	A. M. Turaz	Barnali Chattopadhyay	5:13
8.	"Ek Baar Dekh Lijiye"	A. M. Turaz	Kalpana Gandharva	4:11
9.	"Nazariya Ki Maari"	Traditional	Madhubanti Bagchi	3:17
Total length:				32:40
