= Saale Aashiq =

Indian Hindi-language television film

- Promotional poster
- Directed by: Siddharth–Garima
- Written by: Siddharth–Garima
- Starring: Tahir Raj Bhasin; Mithila Palkar; Chunky Pandey; Tanvi Azmi; Darshan Jariwala; Vrajesh Hirjee; Neelima Azeem; Rajesh Jais
- Cinematography: Nuthan Nagraj
- Edited by: Devendra Murdeshwar
- Production company: Sony Pictures Films India
- Distributed by: Sony MAX
- Release date: 31 January 2025
- Running time: 120 minutes
- Country: India
- Language: Hindi

Saale Aashiq is a 2025 Indian Hindi-language television film written and directed by the duo Siddharth–Garima. Starring Tahir Raj Bhasin and Mithila Palkar, with Chunky Pandey and Darshan Jariwala in supporting roles, the film follows an inter-caste couple who confront violent social opposition rooted in honour-based practices. It premiered directly on Sony MAX on 1 February 2025 after promotional material rolled out in January.

== Premise ==
Set in a small town in Madhya Pradesh, the film follows Shatru and Gudia, two young people from different castes who fall in love despite the weight of entrenched traditions and political pressures. Their relationship quickly attracts disapproval from both families and the wider community. As intimidation escalates into death threats, the couple must decide whether to risk everything for their right to choose each other, or give in to the demands of family honour.

== Cast and characters ==
- Tahir Raj Bhasin as Shatru (Shatru Rewal)
- Mithila Palkar as Gudia (Gudia Kiwal)
- Chunky Pandey as Jagdish Bhajmodia
- Tanvi Azmi as Saroja Kiwal
- Darshan Jariwala as Raghubir Kiwal
- Vrajesh Hirjee as Subhash Kamat
- Neelima Azeem as Gendhi Rewal
- Rajesh Jais as Charanjit Rewal
- Zahid Khan as Gattu
- Vyom Sharma as Jigra

== Production ==
The film is written and directed by the duo Siddharth Singh and Garima Wahal, with Sony Pictures Films India credited as production company. In interviews ahead of release, the filmmakers said the project had a decade-long development cycle centred on the subject of inter-caste romance and honour killings.

== Release ==
Although originally conceived for a theatrical rollout, the film did not secure a cinema or digital release. It premiered directly on television through Sony MAX on 1 February 2025. Promotional posters and teasers were unveiled in January.

== Controversy ==
Saale Aashiq attracted attention even before its release. Siddharth–Garima disclosed that multiple streaming platforms declined to acquire the film, considering its subject matter "too controversial." They further mentioned that some digital services were "more scared than the censor board" in taking on the story. With neither a theatrical run nor a streaming deal forthcoming, the makers opted for a satellite-first release strategy, which was seen as an unconventional step for a contemporary Hindi feature.
