= Dhadak 2 =

2025 Indian film by Shazia Iqbal

- Theatrical release poster
- Directed by: Shazia Iqbal
- Written by: Rahul Badwelkar; Shazia Iqbal
- Based on: Pariyerum Perumal (2018) by Mari Selvaraj
- Produced by: Karan Johar; Umesh Kumar Bansal; Adar Poonawalla; Apoorva Mehta; Meenu Aroraa; Somen Mishra; Pragati Deshmukh
- Starring: Siddhant Chaturvedi; Triptii Dimri
- Cinematography: Sylvester Fonseca
- Edited by: Omkar Uttam Sakpal; Sangeeth Varghese
- Music by: Score: Tanuj Tiku; Songs: Rochak Kohli; Tanishk Bagchi; Javed-Mohsin; Shreyas Puranik
- Production companies: Zee Studios; Dharma Productions; Cloud 9 Pictures
- Distributed by: Zee Studios
- Release date: 1 August 2025
- Running time: 146 minutes
- Country: India
- Language: Hindi
- Box office: est. ₹29 crore

Dhadak 2 (transl. Heartbeat 2) is a 2025 Indian Hindi-language romantic drama film written and directed by Shazia Iqbal and produced by Dharma Productions, Zee Studios and Cloud 9 Pictures. A spiritual sequel to Dhadak (2018) and a remake of the Tamil film Pariyerum Perumal (2018), it stars Siddhant Chaturvedi and Triptii Dimri.

Dhadak 2 was released theatrically on 1 August 2025 to positive reviews, but underperformed at the box office, grossing approximately ₹30 crore worldwide against a production budget of ₹60 crore.

== Plot ==
Neelesh “Neelu” Ahirwar is a law student from a historically marginalized, lower-caste community. Through the reservation system, he gains admission to a prestigious law school, where he intends to earnestly work hard and study to become a lawyer. In college, he meets Vidhi Bharadwaj, a classmate from an upper-caste, socially privileged family. Despite their different backgrounds, the two develop a close friendship which gradually blossoms into love.

As their bond deepens, the social reality around them becomes ruthlessly clear. Vidhi's family, especially her closer relatives, begin to object to the relationship. At one point, Neelesh is invited to Vidhi's sister's Nimisha's wedding. Her father Arvind reluctantly allows him to attend, but at the wedding, Neelesh is beaten by Vidhi's cousins for "daring" to associate with someone from a higher caste. Her cousin brother Raunak "Ronnie" Bhardwaj, who studies in the same class as them, even urinates on him to make this point, and while Arvind prevents further physical humiliation, he reiterates his message.

For a time, Neelesh stays away from her, but the feelings of frustration and anger within him cause him to fight for his rights in other ways. For example, instead of sitting in the back of the class with the other lower caste students, he decides to sit in the front - in a seat generally used by Ronnie. This results in more bullying, this time in the college campus, resulting in Ronnie's suspension. As part of the disciplinary action, Neelesh's father is summoned to the college, where he also gets humiliated by Ronnie's friends, further increasing Neelesh's frustration.

Shekhar, a lower-caste activist student, ends up committing suicide due to being overwhelmed by the pressures and injustices around him, and the shared traumatic experience results in a reconciliation between Neelesh and Vidhi. However, Vidhi's relatives are still against their relationship, and end up hiring Shankar, who is a vigilante "enforcer" of caste violence to kill Neelesh, who manages to escape while Shankar eventually commits suicide for the dishonor of not completing his job properly. Seeing Ronnie at the scene, he realizes who orchestrated this and chases after Ronnie all the way to the latter's home. Neelesh stops himself from killing Ronnie, but reveals all the injustice they have committed on him in public, humiliating them instead.

When Arvind's brother and Ronnie attempt to harm Neelesh further, Vidhi resists with a loud scream. Ronnie is ultimately forced to relent, as is the Bhardwaj family, though the trauma between the couple still remains despite them ending up together.

== Cast ==
- Siddhant Chaturvedi as Neelesh Ahirwar
- Triptii Dimri as Vidhi Bharadwaj
- Zakir Hussain as Principal Haider Ansari
- Saurabh Sachdeva as Shankar
- Deeksha Joshi as Nimisha, Vidhi's sister
- Vipin Sharma as Mr. Ahirwar, Neelesh's father
- Saad Bilgrami as Ronnie Bharadwaj, Vidhi's cousin
- Harish Khanna as Arvind Bharadwaj, Vidhi's father
- Priyank Tiwari as Shekhar
- Aditya Thakare as Vasu
- Abhay Joshi as Prakash Bharadwaj, Vidhi's uncle
- Anubha Fatehpura as Mrs. Ahirwar Neelesh's mother
- Manjari Pupala as Richa
- Javed Khan as Himself

== Production ==
Dhadak 2 began pre-production in April 2023, with Siddhant Chaturvedi and Triptii Dimri leading the cast under the production of Karan Johar. The film's official announcement was made on 15 May 2025, introducing the characters of Dimri and Chaturvedi in a musical teaser. Principal photography began in November 2024. Major parts of the film were shot in Bhopal and Sehore in Madhya Pradesh. Somaiya Vidyavihar University in Mumbai and the Oriental Group of Institutes in Bhopal served as the backdrop for the college scenes in the film.

== Soundtrack ==
Dhadak 2

Soundtrack album by Rochak Kohli, Tanishk Bagchi, Javed-Mohsin and Shreyas Puranik
- Released: 5 August 2025
- Genre: Feature film soundtrack
- Length: 23:21
- Language: Hindi
- Label: Zee Music Company
External audio
- Dhadak 2 - Full Album on YouTube

The music of the film is composed by Rochak Kohli, Tanishk Bagchi, Javed-Mohsin and Shreyas Puranik while the lyrics is written by Rashmi Virag, Siddharth–Garima, Gurpreet Saini and Ozil Dalal.

The first single titled "Bas Ek Dhadak" was released on 16 July 2025. The second single titled "Preet Re' was released on 21 July 2025. The third single titled "Duniya Alag" was released on 28 July 2025.

Track listing
No.	Title	Lyrics	Music	Singer(s)	Length
1.	"Bas Ek Dhadak"	Rashmi Virag	Javed-Mohsin	Shreya Ghoshal, Jubin Nautiyal	4:19
2.	"Preet Re"	Gurpreet Saini	Rochak Kohli	Darshan Raval, Jonita Gandhi, Rochak Kohli	3:16
3.	"Duniya Alag"	Siddharth-Garima	Shreyas Puranik	Arijit Singh	3:58
4.	"Bawaria"	Ozil Dalal	Tanishk Bagchi	Jubin Nautiyal, Suvarna Tiwari	3:40
5.	"Ye Kaisa Ishq"	Gurpreet Saini	Rochak Kohli	Rochak Kohli	3:07
6.	"Tu Meri Dhadak Hai"	Rashmi Virag	Javed-Mohsin	Vishal Mishra	5:01
Total length:					23:21

== Release ==
The film was initially scheduled for a theatrical release on 22 November 2024, but it was postponed multiple times—first to 21 February 2025 and then to 1 August 2025. All previous release dates were missed due to various delays, including issues related to CBFC clearance. It was later released on 1 August 2025.

=== Home media ===
The film began streaming on Netflix from 26 September 2025.

== Reception ==
=== Box office ===
Dhadak 2 has grossed ₹29 crore (equivalent to ₹30 crore or US$3.1 million in 2026) till date.

=== Critical reception ===
Dhadak 2 received generally positive reviews from critics, with praise for the performances and the themes but some critics compared it unfavorably to the original. On the review aggregator website Rotten Tomatoes, 63% of 16 critics' reviews are positive, with an average rating of 5.5/10.

Rahul Desai of The Hollywood Reporter India commented that "Shazia Iqbal’s remake of Pariyerum Perumal is a brave and intuitive entry in the canon of anti-caste storytelling." Subhash K Jha writing for News 24 gave 4.5 stars out of 5 and writes that "Dhadak 2 is an experience far beyond the original. This is not a remake. It is an intelligent emotional recreation which irons out the rough edges, makes the original characters sharper and more authentic, adds new ones, imbuing the end product with a vigorous glow." Divya Nair of Rediff.com awarded 4 stars out of 5 and noted that "After a long time, here's a film that does justice to the people whose stories are never heard or written about." Writing for The Hindu, Anuj Kumar called the film a mixed bag mentioning,"In Dhadak 2, a remake of the Tamil film Pariyerum Perumal, where caste becomes the villain in a young romance, debutant director Shazia Iqbal struggles to strike a balance between retaining the voice of the original and applying a Dharma polish to a social reality that has been mainly out of the syllabus for Bollywood biggies."

Shachi Chaturvedi of News 18 rated it 3.5/5 stars and commented that "It is a compelling romantic thriller tackling caste issues in modern India. Don't miss it. Critic of Bollywood Hungama gave it 3.5 stars out of 5 and said that Dhadak 2 makes an important comment on the caste system and works due to the subject, performances, hard-hitting scenes and powerful climax." Nandini Ramnath writing for Scroll.in observed that "The Hindi adaptation would have done well to dispense with the overreach of some of its source material. While Dhadak 2 starkly reveals the manner in which casteism undermines the body, intellect and soul, the 146-minute movie piles on the misery for Neelesh, particularly in the heavy-going sections leading up to the climax." Sana Farzeen of India Today rated 3/5 stars and said that Dhadak 2 has its heart in the right place and boasts compelling performances, but it stops short of becoming the powerful, unapologetic film it had the potential to be." Rishabh Suri of Hindustan Times rated 2.5/5 stars writes in his review that "Dhadak 2 is a film that carries a powerful message but fumbles with its storytelling. It wants to speak about caste, oppression, and systemic injustice- and when it does, it hits the right notes. But it's weighed down by an uneven narrative and an overstretched runtime. This could have been a hard-hitting social drama. Instead, it settles for moments of brilliance buried under a ton of missed opportunities."

Radhika Sharma of NDTV gave 3 stars out of 5 and said that "The Shazia Iqbal film calls a spade a spade, but the ending feels too good to be true." Vinamra Mathur of Firstpost gave 3 stars out of 5 and observed that "Dhadak 2 may not change the scheme of things despite shedding light on the dark side of the nation. It also at times bites more than it can chew, with the screenplay juxtaposing horror and humour together." Devesh Sharma of Filmfare rated it 4/5 stars and said that "This film isn't for the faint-hearted. It will make you uncomfortable, and that’s exactly the point. Because it should. As a society, we’ve learned to take caste discrimination in stride. We treat it like something that exists only in headlines, not in real life. Even when it happens right in front of us, we often choose to look away." Writing for Mint, Uday Bhatia mentioned,"Shazia Iqbal’s Dhadak 2, a Hindi remake of Pariyerum Perumal, takes a great deal from Mari Selvaraj’s superb 2018 Tamil film. I don’t remember this scene, though. It's a throwaway joke, but a telling one. Unlike most Hindi films about caste, which either tiptoe around the issue or are boringly instructional, Dhadak 2 can imagine how people who’ve seen oppression their whole lives might turn it into gallows humour." Shubhra Gupta of The Indian Express rated the film 2.5 stars out of 5 and said that "This is a film which is clearly on the right side of many of the hot button issues we need to be pressing: casteism, classism, feminism, gender identities. While at it, you can see an awareness of the wrongs and injustices which have made, and continue to make headlines."

== Awards and nominations ==
2026	Zee Cine Award	Best Actor – Female	Dhadak 2	Nominated
