= Suresh Selvarajan =

Indian film production designer and art director

- Born: Chidambaram, Tamil Nadu, India
- Education: Bachelor of Fine Arts, Pondicherry University
- Occupations: Production designer; art director
- Years active: 2012–present

Suresh Selvarajan is an Indian production designer and art director who predominantly works in Tamil, Telugu and Hindi films. He is best known for his collaborations with director Koratala Siva on Bharat Ane Nenu (2018) and Acharya (2022).

== Early life ==
Suresh was born in Chidambaram, Tamil Nadu. He received a state award for painting at the age of nineteen.

== Career ==
Suresh began as an assistant to production designer Sabu Cyril. His first significant project was working alongside Sabu Cyril on the iconic film "Enthiran (2010)", featuring Rajinikanth. This marked the beginning of Suresh's successful career, spanning nearly a decade during which he collaborated with Sabu Cyril on 14 films.

In 2017, Suresh collaborated with director Koratala Siva on Bharat Ane Nenu (2018), which marked their first collaboration where he designed the exact replica of the State Legislative Assembly at a studio in Hyderabad. In addition to this, he also designed a temple set worth Rs 4 crore for the "Vachaadayyo Saami" song sequence, which only appeared once in the movie. Suresh's work on Bharat Ane Nenu made an impression on Koratala Siva which eventually made him select Suresh as the production designer for Acharya (2022).

For the film Acharya, Suresh was responsible for designing the fictional town of Dharmasthali which is the biggest set erected in India. The set was built over 20 acres and included a temple, a tribal area, and a river bed. Suresh's work on the film was praised by the producer Ram Charan, critics and audiences alike. Suresh took four months to come up with the blueprint and another three months for the construction. The fictional town was later rented out to Salman Khan's Kisi Ka Bhai Kisi Ki Jaan free of charge.

On February 27, 2023, a major fire incident occurred on the Acharya film set, located near Kokapet Lake on the outskirts of Hyderabad. The grand temple structure of Dharmasthali was engulfed in flames, with a video of the fire circulating online. Reports suggested that someone present on the set was smoking a cigarette, and after discarding the cigarette butt, a fire erupted.

== Filmography ==
=== As art director ===
Year	Film	Language	Notes
2004	Arul	Tamil	Assistant art director
2004	Sullan	Tamil	Assistant art director
2005	Kyon Ki	Hindi	Assistant art director
2005	Sandakozhi	Tamil	Assistant art director
2006	Bhagam Bhag	Hindi	Assistant art director
2007	Bhool Bhulaiyaa	Hindi	Assistant art director
2007	Om Shanti Om	Hindi	Assistant art director
2009	Billu Barber	Hindi	Assistant art director
2009	Aladin	Hindi	Assistant art director
2010	Khatta Meetha	Hindi	Assistant art director
2011	Enthiran	Tamil	Assistant art director
2011	Ra. One	Hindi	Assistant art director
2012	Tezz	Hindi	Assistant art director
2012	Agneepath	Hindi	
2013	Krrish 3	Hindi	
2014	Yaan	Tamil	

=== As production designer ===
Year	Film	Language	Notes
2015	Brothers	Hindi	
2015	Radiopetti	Tamil	
2016	Iru Mugan	Tamil	
2018	Bharath Ane Nenu	Telugu	
2019	Petta	Tamil	
2019	Typewriter	Hindi	Television series
2019	Adithya Varma	Tamil	
2022	Acharya	Telugu	
2022	Godfather	Telugu	
2023	Shehzada	Hindi	
2023	Animal	Hindi	
2025	Badass Ravi Kumar	Hindi	
2026	King †	Hindi	
2027	Spirit †	Telugu	
