= Bibhishon =

2025 Indian psychological thriller series

- Promotional poster
- Genre: Psychological thriller
- Created by: Prameet A Ghosh
- Written by: Pramit A Ghosh
- Screenplay by: Raja Chanda; Pramit A Ghosh
- Directed by: Raja Chanda
- Starring: Soham Majumdar; Debchandrima Singha Roy
- Music by: Rathijit Bhattacharjee
- Country of origin: India
- Original language: Bengali
- No. of seasons: 1
- No. of episodes: 7

Production
- Cinematography: Vicky Soumyadipta Guin
- Editor: MD Kalam
- Production company: Raja Chanda Films

Original release
- Network: ZEE5
- Release: 27 June 2025

Bibhishon is a Bengali-language psychological thriller series directed by Raja Chanda. The series was released on ZEE5 on 27 June 2025 and stars Soham Majumdar as Sub-Inspector Bidhan Sen and Debchandrima Singha Roy as his wife, Brishti. Set in the town of Birbhum, the story follows a police investigation that brings hidden aspects of the characters' pasts to light. It is a remake of the 2022 Tamil series Vilangu.

== Premise ==
Set in the town of Birbhum and centers on Sub-Inspector Bidhan Sen, who is assigned to investigate a set of unusual incidents, including a theft, a missing person case, and the discovery of a headless body. As the investigation progresses, Bidhan is confronted with revelations that connect the case to someone from his own past. The narrative incorporates elements of psychological tension and personal conflict.

== Cast ==
- Soham Majumdar as Sub-Inspector Bidhan Sen
- Debchandrima Singha Roy as Brishti, Bidhan's wife
- Debopriyo Mukherjee
- Amit Saha as Chidam Tudu
- Katha Nandi
- Sanjib Sarkar
- Pradip Dhar
- Subrata Guha Roy
- Aloke Sanyal
- Arpita De

== Release ==
The series was released on ZEE5 on 27 June 2025.

== Episodes ==
No.	Title	Directed by	Original release date
1	"The Jungle Episode"	Raja Chanda	27 June 2025
While serving as the temporary officer in charge of Balagarh Police Station, Bidhan handles two investigations: one into the missing brother-in-law of the Panchayat Head, Dinesh, and another related to a reported theft. During the course of these inquiries, authorities discover a dismembered corpse.
2	"The Headless One"	Raja Chanda	27 June 2025
The discovery of a headless body causes turmoil within the police station. As Bidhan becomes deeply involved in the investigation, his pregnant wife suffers an injury. Meanwhile, the police receive important leads from Chhidam, an assistant.
3	"The Allies of Deadly Snakes"	Raja Chanda	27 June 2025
Dinesh’s remains are eventually found, and Bidhan is encouraged to look into the matter off the record. The investigation becomes more complex when two separate confessions emerge. Amidst these developments, Bidhan welcomes the birth of his daughter.
4	"The Web of Illusions"	Raja Chanda	27 June 2025
Bidhan goes to see Brishti at the hospital. Returning to the station, he frees the suspects involved in the theft case as part of his strategy. Ultimately, he confronts the person responsible for Dinesh’s murder.
5	"Bibhishon"	Raja Chanda	27 June 2025
Chhidam is taken into custody and ultimately admits to his crimes, leaving Bidhan and the entire station stunned. Bidhan then vows to look after his family.
6	"The Trial by Fire"	Raja Chanda	27 June 2025
Bidhan persistently questions Chhidam to gain insight into his thoughts. However, the situation becomes complicated when Chhidam denies any involvement in the murder during his statement to the ADSP.
7	"Restoration of Dharma"	Raja Chanda	27 June 2025
Bidhan and Chhidam talk about their past, and once Chhidam feels confident about his daughter’s well-being, he explains his actions and turns himself in. Meanwhile, Bidhan persists in his search for the missing head.

== Reception ==
=== Critical reception ===
Bhaswati Ghosh of TV9 Bangla rated the series 3/5 stars opined "Overall, it's something you can watch once. You can't stop watching it after watching one or two episodes. However, it is not like you can come back to this web series." She praised its indulging storyline, the chemistry between the leads, Soham's emotive performance, the humane portrayal of the conflict between the protagonist and antagonist, and the slow reveal of the mystery in the series. But she bemoaned the lack of tension in certain scenes and the weakly choregraphed shooting sequences.
