= Dukaan =

- Theatrical Release Poster
- Directed by: Siddharth–Garima
- Written by: Siddharth Singh; Garima Wahal
- Produced by: S K Ahluwalia; Siddharth Singh; Garima Wahal; Srujan Yarabolu
- Starring: Sikandar Kher; Monika Panwar; Monali Thakur; Soham Majumdar; Vrajesh Hirjee
- Cinematography: Anirban Chatterjee
- Edited by: Satya Sharma
- Music by: Shreyas Puranik
- Production companies: Waveband Productions; Kalamkaar Picture Productions
- Distributed by: UFO Moviez
- Release date: 5 April 2024 (India)
- Running time: 132 minutes
- Country: India
- Language: Hindi
- Box office: ₹0.18 crore

Dukaan is a 2024 Hindi-language comedy drama film written and directed by Siddharth Singh and Garima Wahal, and produced by S K Ahluwalia, Siddharth Singh, Garima Wahal, and Srujan Yarabolu, under the banner of Waveband Productions and Kalamkaar Picture Productions. The film features Monika Panwar, Monali Thakur and Soham Majumdar as the lead characters.

== Cast ==
- Monika Panwar as Jasmine
- Monali Thakur as Diya
- Soham Majumdar as Armaan
- Sikandar Kher as Sumer
- Vrajesh Hirjee as Pramod Trivedi
- Insane Ashraf as Birju
- Azhar J Malik
- Hridansh Parekh as Jamaal
- Romanch Soni

== Plot ==
The film follows the journey of Chameli, who rebrands herself as Jasmine (played by Monika Panwar) to stand out from the crowd. After a personal tragedy leaves her resentful towards children, she unexpectedly finds companionship in Sumer (Sikandar Kher) and becomes a stepmother to his daughter, who is close to her age. Determined to build a life on her own terms, Jasmine takes up surrogacy for financial stability and finds a supportive circle in Dr. Navya Chandel (Geetika Tyagi) and fellow surrogates. However, things take a complicated turn when she decides to keep the baby she carried for Diya (Monali Thakur) and Armaan (Soham Majumdar), leading to a heartbreaking conflict over who truly has the right to raise the child.

== Soundtrack ==
Dukaan

Soundtrack album by Shreyas Puranik
- Genre: Feature film soundtrack
- Length: 13:50
- Language: Hindi
- Label: Music Garage

All lyrics are written by Siddharth-Garima; all music is composed by Shreyas Puranik.

No.	Title	Singer(s)	Length
1.	"Maa Banne Wali Hoon"	Shreya Ghoshal, Aishwarya Bhandari	2:17
2.	"Rang Maar De Holi Hai"	Sunidhi Chauhan, Vishal Dadlani, Bhoomi Trivedi, Osman Mir	3:03
3.	"Moh Na Laage"	Arijit Singh, Shreyas Puranik	2:47
4.	"Love Story Natthi"	Mohit Chauhan, Osman Mir, Aishwarya Bhandari	2:33
5.	"Train Song"	Ananya Wadkar, Prajakta Shukre, Meenal Jain, Apurva Nisshad, Divya Kumar	3:10
Total length:			13:50

== Release ==
Dukaan was released theatrically on 5 April 2024. A special screening was organized in Ahmedabad and more than 300 surrogates were invited.

== Reception ==
Dhaval Roy of The Times of India rated the film 3 stars out of 5 stars and noted "Dukaan is an intriguing concept with a strong lead performance, but the execution falters, leaving one wanting more." Sonal Pandya of Times Now rated the film 2 stars out of 5 stars and noted "From its unwieldy introduction to the syrupy closing scenes, Dukaan isn't quite sure about how to handle its initial message about found families and parenthood."

Rohit Bhatnagar of The Free Press Journal said "If you are up for some Garba dance moves, want to delve into Gujarati culture, or want to watch a fresh face Monika Panwar at her best, risk it for yourself, else, Mimi and Chori Chori Chupke Chupke are a still far better bets."

Sukanya Verma of Rediff.com rated 1/5 stars and asserts "Its callous perspective and comical treatment of a sensitive matter makes a complete hash of things."

Ishita Sengupta of OTTPlay commented "The Year’s Worst Film Is Possibly Here" and "Dukaan centres on surrogacy, but unfolds as a cautionary tale on how not to make a film".

Pankaj Shukla from Amar Ujala rated the film 2 out of 5, commenting that while the concept holds potential, the storytelling lacks impact. He drew comparisons to stronger directorial visions and noted that despite years of effort, the execution falls short of leaving a lasting impression.

Upma Singh from Navbharat Times rated the film 2.5/5. She praised its colorful visuals, music, and Monica Panwar's strong performance as Jasmine. While the first half is engaging, the story loses focus, and feels stretched post-interval.

Sonal Pandya from Times Now rated the film 2/5, noting that while Dukaan attempts to highlight the rights of surrogates in India. its overloaded narrative and clumsy execution hinder its impact. Monika Panwar's portrayal of Jasmine is spirited, but the storytelling lacks finesse.
