= Harshavardhan Rameshwar =

Indian music composer

- Born: Chennai, Tamil Nadu, India
- Occupations: Vocalist; film scorer; keyboardist
- Instruments: Vocals; Keyboard
- Years active: 2016–present
- Labels: Aditya Music; Lahari Music; Sony Music; T-Series; Zee Music Company; Saregama

Harshavardhan Rameshwar is an Indian composer, instrumentalist, music producer and singer who works in Telugu cinema. He is known for his collaborations with Sandeep Reddy Vanga including Arjun Reddy (2017) and Animal (2023). His other compositions include Ravanasura (2023).

He won the National Film Award for Best Background Music for Animal (2023).

== Early life and career ==
Harshavardhan Rameshwar was born in Chennai, Tamil Nadu, India in a Telugu family. His father Lakshmi Narayana was a percussionist and worked with various leading music composers across India. Harshavardhan's family is native to Rajamahendravaram, Andhra Pradesh and settled in Chennai for his father's music career.

He worked as a rhythm player, keyboardist, beatboxer and later as an assistant programmer for various music composers. He met Sandeep Reddy Vanga when he was working for the music composer Radhan and made his debut as the film scorer for Arjun Reddy (2017). The film's background music was widely appreciated and he continued to work in various films including his debut Hindi film Kabir Singh (2019) and Ravanasura (2023). His composition in the Hindi film Animal (2023) further solidified his popularity. The songs were commercially successful and he won his first National Film Award for background music.

== Discography ==
=== As composer ===
List of original soundtracks and scores
Year	Title	Credited as		Language	Notes	Ref.
Year	Title	Score	Songs	Language	Notes	Ref.
2017	Arjun Reddy	Yes	No	Telugu		
2018	Vijetha	Yes	Yes	Telugu		
2018	Saakshyam	Yes	Yes	Telugu		
2019	Kabir Singh	Yes	No	Hindi		
2019	George Reddy	Yes	No	Telugu		
2020	Pressure Cooker	Yes	Yes	Telugu	2 songs	
2020	Kannum Kannum Kollaiyadithaal	Yes	Yes	Tamil	4 songs	
2020	Raju Gari Kidnap	No	Yes	Telugu		
2021	3:33	Yes	Yes	Tamil		
2022	Jothi	Yes	Yes	Tamil		
2022	Alluri	Yes	Yes	Telugu		
2022	Top Gear	Yes	Yes	Telugu		
2023	Ravanasura	Yes	Yes	Telugu		
2023	Animal	Yes	Yes	Hindi	4 songs	
2023	Devil: The British Secret Agent	Yes	Yes	Telugu		
2024	Raju Yadav	Yes	Yes	Telugu		
2024	Sriranga Neethulu	Yes	Yes	Telugu	Along with Ajay Arasada	
2024	Roti Kapda Romance	Yes	Yes	Telugu		
2025	The 100	Yes	Yes	Telugu		
2026	Anomie	Yes	Yes	Malayalam		
2026	Slum Dog †	Yes	Yes	Telugu		
2026	Bro Code †	Yes	Yes	Tamil		
TBA	Spirit †	Yes	Yes	Telugu		
TBA	Naa Naa †	Yes	Yes	Tamil	Delayed	

=== As playback singer ===
Year	Song	Album	Language	Composer	Notes
2018	"Design Your Destiny"	Saakshyam	Telugu	Himself	
2018	"Cheliya Choode"	Saakshyam	Telugu	Himself	
2020	"Assai Illa"	Kannum Kannum Kollaiyadithaal	Tamil	Himself	
2020	"Maaga Maaga"	Kannum Kannum Kollaiyadithaal	Tamil	Himself	
2020	"Cherokkato"	Kanulu Kanulanu Dhochaayante	Telugu	Himself	Dubbed version
2020	"Aasaleni"	Kanulu Kanulanu Dhochaayante	Telugu	Himself	Dubbed version
2020	"Maaga Maaga"	Kanulu Kanulanu Dhochaayante	Telugu	Himself	Dubbed version
2023	"Ravanasura Anthem"	Ravanasura	Telugu	Himself	
2023	"Papa Meri Jaan" (Whistle)	Animal	Hindi	Himself	
2024	"Hey Raju"	Raju Yadav	Telugu	Himself	
2024	"Jananamaina"	Raju Yadav	Telugu	Himself	

== Awards and nominations ==
Award	Year	Category	Work	Result	Ref.
Filmfare Awards	2024	Best Music Director	Animal	Won	
Filmfare Awards	2024	Best Background Score	Animal	Won	
International Indian Film Academy Awards	2024	Best Music Director	Animal	Won	
International Indian Film Academy Awards	2024	Best Background Score	Animal	Won	
Mirchi Music Awards	2024	Album of The Year	Animal	Nominated	
Mirchi Music Awards	2024	Background Score of the Year	Animal	Nominated	
National Film Awards	2025	Best Background Music	Animal	Won	
