= Jackie Vanjari =

Indian singer and composer

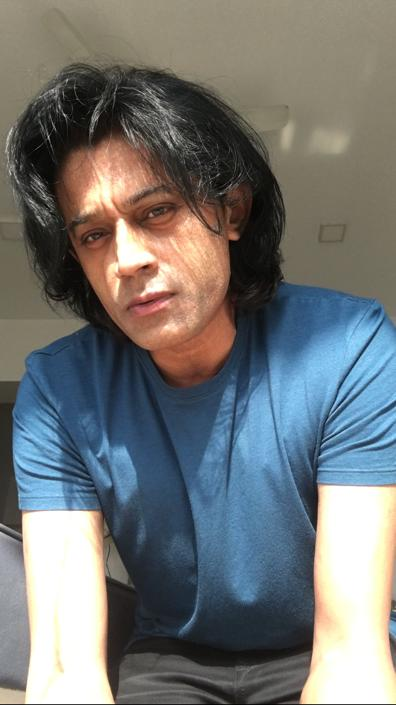
- Born: 10 October 1970 (age 55); Mumbai, Maharashtra, India
- Spouse: Sheetal Vanjari
- Children: Divaa Vanjari
- Musical career
- Genres: Indian music
- Occupations: Music Producer, composer
- Years active: 1985–present

Jackie Vanjari born as Jaikishan Vanjari is an Indian music producer. Jacky started working with Legendary R.D. Burman movies like ijaazat, indrajeet, parinda, and 1942 love story. Jackie started playing Accordion then keyboards and started producing songs for renowned music directors. Then he got the opportunity to work with Nusrat Fateh Ali khan Sahab for films like Aur pyaar ho gaya, Kachche Dhaage, Kartoos.

He also worked with Hari Haran, for a Ghazal Album (Kaash) and with Sonu Nigam for the album The Music Room.

== Filmography As a Music Producer ==
- Border (1997)
- Chachi 420 (1997)
- Satya (film) (1998)
- Jahan Tum Le Chalo (1999)
- Hu Tu Tu (1999)
- Godmother (film) (1999)
- Aśoka (2001)
- Lajja (2001)
- Yaadein (2001)
- Om Jai Jagadish (2002)
- Awara Paagal Deewana (2002)
- Munna Bhai M.B.B.S. (2003)
- Karle Pyaar Karle (2003)
- Khushi (2003)
- Murder (2004)
- Ek Ajnabee (2004)
- Zeher (2005)
- Golmaal: Fun Unlimited (2006)
- Om Shanti Om (2007)
- Jab We Met (2007) Yeh Ishq Hai
- Dhol (2007)
- Cash (2007)
- Ta Ra Rum Pum (2007)
- Goal (2007)
- Tashan (2008)
- Dostana (2008)
- Ugly Aur Pagli (2008) Song Talli
- Aladin (2009)
- Kambakkht Ishq (2009)
- Kites (2010)
- Ishqiya (2010)
- Toonpur Ka Super Hero (2010)
- I Hate Luv Storys (2010)
- Tees Maar Khan (2010)
- Dabangg (2010) Munni Badnaam Hui Remix
- The Dirty Picture (2011)
- Rascals (2011)
- Shanghai (2012)
- Shirin Farhad Ki Toh Nikal Padi (2012)
- Agent Vinod (2012)
- Goliyon Ki Raasleela Ram-Leela (2013)
- Krrish 3 (2013)
- Chennai Express (2013) Title Song
- Happy New Year (2014)
- Dishkiyaoon (2014)
- Brahma (2014) Ting Ting (Kannada)
- Bajirao Mastani (2015)
- Uppi 2 (2015) No Excuse me please (Kannada)
- Hey Bro (2015)
- Ishq Forever (2016)
- Hello Naan Pei Pesuren (Tamil) (2016)
- Kaabil (2017)
- Tiger Zinda Hai (2017) Dil Diyan Gallan
- Padmaavat (2018) Binte Dil
- Ayushman Bhava (2019) Sara Sara (Kannada)
- Malaal (2019) Udhaal, Aila re, Katthai Katthai
- Dream Girl (2019) Radhe Radhe
- Gharga (2020) Bhangi Sediro (Kannada)
- Chehre (2021) Title Track
- Gangubai Kathiawadi (2022) Meri Jaan
- Satyaprem Ki Katha (2023) Gujju Pataka & Sun Sajani
- DReam Girl 2 (2023) Mai Marjawangi
- Dukaan (2024) Moh Na Laage, Love Story Natthi & Rang Maar De Holi Hai
- Do Deewane Sheher Mein - Reprised (2026)
- Do Deewane Seher Mein - Title Track (2026)
- Manjogi - Bhabiji Ghar Par Hain (2026)
