= Raju Yadav (2024 film) =

2024 Telugu film

- Theatrical release poster
- Directed by: Krishnamachary
- Written by: Krishnamachary
- Produced by: Vamsi Krishna Karumanchi; Kedar Selagamsetty
- Starring: Getup Srinu
- Cinematography: SaiRam Uday
- Edited by: Bonthala Nageswara Reddy
- Music by: Harshavardhan Rameshwar; Ram Miriyala (1 song)
- Production companies: Charisma Dreams Entertainment; Sai Varunavi Creations
- Release date: 24 May 2024
- Running time: 121 minutes
- Country: India
- Language: Telugu

Raju Yadav is a 2024 Indian Telugu-language romantic comedy film directed by Uday Shetty and starring Getup Srinu, Ananda Chakrapani, Rocket Raghava, Mirchi Hemanth, Jabardasth Sunny, Santosh Kalwacherla, Sriram, Kalyan Bhushan, Sree Mani, Pawon Ramesh, and Uthara Prashanth. The movie trailer was released on 5 May 2024 and Teja Sajja launched the trailer of the film. The movie was supposed to be released on 17 May 2024, but was postponed to 24 May 2024, as theatres were closed in Telanagana. It is the debut movie of Getup Srinu as a lead actor.

== Cast ==
- Getup Srinu
- Sriram
- Jabardasth Sunny
- Chakrapani Ananda
- R.J. Hemant
- Santosh Kalwacherla
- Bhushan Kalyan
- Ankitha Kharath
- Uthara Prashanth
- Rocket Raghava
- Pawon Ramesh
- Sreemani

== Music ==
In the album 5 songs were composed by Harshavardhan Rameshwar and 1 song by Ram Miriyala. The soundtrack was produced under the label Aditya Music.

Raju Yadav

Soundtrack album by Harshavardhan Rameshwar Ram Miriyala
- Released: 2024
- Genre: Soundtrack
- Language: Telugu
- Label: Aditya Music

Track List
No.	Title	Lyrics	Music	Artist(s)	Length
1.	"Raju Yadav Chudu"	Chandrabose	Ram Miriyala	Ram Miriyala	04:02
2.	"This Is My Daridram"	Kasarla Shyam	Harshavardhan Rameshwar	Rahul Sipligunj, Mangli	03:46
3.	"Lede Lede Premasale"	Chandrabose	Harshavardhan Rameshwar	Chandrabose	05:08
4.	"Feel My Smile"	Kasarla Shyam	Harshavardhan Rameshwar	Yasaswi Kondepudi	03:33
5.	"Hey Raju"	Purna Chary	Harshavardhan Rameshwar	Harshavardhan Rameshwar	01:35
6.	"Jananamaina"	Harshavardhan Rameshwar	Harshavardhan Rameshwar	Harshavardhan Rameshwar	01:36

== Release and reception ==
The Times of India gave the movie 2.5/5 rating and commended the acting of getup srinu. NTV said the movie is a dysfunctional comedy movie. Indian Express gave the movie 1.5/5 rating.
