= Animal (2023 Indian film) =

2023 Indian film by Sandeep Reddy Vanga

- Theatrical release poster
- Directed by: Sandeep Reddy Vanga
- Screenplay by: Sandeep Reddy Vanga; Pranay Reddy Vanga; Suresh Bandaru
- Dialogues by: Saurabh Gupta
- Story by: Sandeep Reddy Vanga
- Produced by: Bhushan Kumar; Krishan Kumar; Murad Khetani; Pranay Reddy Vanga
- Starring: Ranbir Kapoor; Anil Kapoor; Bobby Deol; Rashmika Mandanna; Tripti Dimri; Shakti Kapoor; Suresh Oberoi; Prem Chopra
- Cinematography: Amit Roy
- Edited by: Sandeep Reddy Vanga
- Music by: Songs: Pritam; JAM8; Vishal Mishra; Manan Bhardwaj; Bhupinder Babbal; Shreyas Puranik; Jaani; Ashim Kemson; Ajay–Atul; Harshavardhan Rameshwar; Gurinder Seagal; Score: Harshavardhan Rameshwar
- Production companies: T-Series Films; Bhadrakali Pictures; Cine1 Studios
- Distributed by: see below
- Release date: 1 December 2023
- Running time: 204 minutes
- Country: India
- Language: Hindi
- Budget: ₹100 crore
- Box office: ₹917.82 crore

Animal is a 2023 Indian Hindi-language action drama film co-written, directed and edited by Sandeep Reddy Vanga and jointly produced by T-Series Films, Bhadrakali Pictures and Cine1 Studios. The film stars Ranbir Kapoor, Anil Kapoor, Bobby Deol, Rashmika Mandanna and Triptii Dimri. The film follows Ranvijay Singh and his troubled relationship with his industrialist father, Balbir Singh. After spending years abroad, Ranvijay learns about an unsuccessful assassination attempt on Balbir and returns home, embarking on a ruthless quest for vengeance.

The film was officially announced in January 2021. Principal photography began in April 2022 and wrapped by April 2023, with cinematography by Amit Roy. The film's soundtrack album was composed by Pritam, JAM8, Vishal Mishra, Jaani, Manan Bhardwaj, Shreyas Puranik, Ashim Kemson and Harshavardhan Rameshwar. With a runtime of 203 minutes, Animal is one of the longest Indian films ever made. It was initially set for an August 2023 release but was postponed due to post-production work.

Animal was theatrically released on 1 December 2023, in standard and IMAX formats to mixed reviews, with praise for its cast performances, direction, screenwriting, soundtrack, cinematography, action sequences and technical aspects but faced severe criticism for its themes and graphic violence. However, the film did very well commercially, both domestically and internationally. It grossed ₹917.82 crore (US$98 million) worldwide, making it the third highest-grossing Indian film of 2023, the fifth highest-grossing Hindi film, the twelfth highest-grossing Indian film and third highest-grossing A-rated Indian film. (Note: Animal's reported worldwide grosses vary between ₹905 crore (Pinkvilla) – ₹917.82 crore (Bollywood Hungama))

At the 69th Filmfare Awards, the film received 19 nominations, including Best Film, and won a leading six awards, including Best Actor for Ranbir Kapoor. At the 22nd Zee Cine Awards 2024, the film won 4 awards, including Best Actor in a Supporting Role award for Anil Kapoor, and the Best Actor In a Negative Role award for Bobby Deol. The film also won 3 awards at the 71st National Film Awards: Special Mention, Best Background Music, and Best Sound Design. A sequel titled Animal Park, announced in the post-credits scene, is in early development.

== Plot ==
In Delhi, Ranvijay "Vijay" Singh is the son of industrialist Balbir Singh, head of steel conglomerate Swastik Steels. Balbir is a workaholic who maintains a distant relationship with his family. As a teenager, Vijay takes a licensed AK-47 to his sister Reet's college to intimidate her bullies, prompting an outraged Balbir to send Vijay to a boarding school in the United States. Years later, Vijay returns home for Balbir's sixtieth birthday, but an argument with Reet's husband, Varun, leads to Balbir disowning him. Vijay marries his childhood sweetheart, Gitanjali, and relocates to the US.

Eight years later, Vijay returns to India with Gitanjali and their two children after Balbir survives an assassination attempt. Reconciling with his father, Vijay assumes control of Balbir's security detail and recruits his distant cousins from his ancestral village for protection. He hires Kailash Petkar, a body double for Balbir. Kailash is later murdered by Asrar Haque, who is revealed to be linked to the initial attack on Balbir.

Upon learning that Varun conspired with the attackers, Vijay strangles him at a public press conference in full view of Asrar. Vijay and his cousins then meet an arms dealer, Freddy, at a hotel to collect a custom-designed multi-barrel machine gun. Asrar and his assailants ambush the hotel, but Vijay massacres them with the weapon and kills Asrar. Vijay suffers severe injuries in the battle, leading to hearing damage, organ failure, and a heart transplant. Meanwhile, in Scotland, Asrar's mute brother, Abrar Haque, learns of his death during his wedding.

During his recovery, Vijay meets Zoya, who claims to be the fiancee of his heart donor, and begins an extramarital affair with her. After Vijay gifts her a car that explodes, a guilt-ridden Zoya reveals that she was sent by Abrar to spy on the family and that Abrar's brother, Aziz, underwent plastic surgery to impersonate Vijay. Vijay discloses that he anticipated her deceit, orchestrated the explosion, and spares her life. Vijay's grandfather, Rajdhir, reveals the origins of the feud: Rajdhir had exiled his younger brother Shamsher for misconduct, and Shamsher's son, Azim, converted to Islam and sought a share of Swastik Steels, which Balbir denied. Humiliated by the rejection, Shamsher immolated himself in front of his grandson Abrar, leaving Abrar mute from trauma and sparking a generational vendetta.

After Vijay confesses his affair to Gitanjali, she demands a divorce. Vijay and his cousins fly to Scotland to track down Abrar. Intercepting Abrar at an airfield, Vijay engages him a duel on the runway and kills Abrar after he rejects his offer of reconciliation. Returning home, Vijay discovers that Balbir has acute lymphoblastic leukemia and only months to live. When Balbir emphasises that Vijay's violence cannot save him from his illness, Vijay confronts him over his lifelong emotional neglect, prompting an apology from Balbir. Meanwhile, Gitanjali prepares to leave with the children, but their son runs back to embrace Vijay.

In a post-credits scene, Aziz completes his plastic surgery to look identical to Vijay. A pregnant Zoya remains uncertain whether Vijay or Aziz is the father while Aziz brutally slays two of Vijay's cousins and proposes marriage to Abrar's third widow.

== Cast ==
- Ranbir Kapoor in a dual role as
  - Ranvijay "Vijay" Singh
    - Ahmad Ibn Umar as young Ranvijay
  - Aziz Haque (voiced by Sandeep Reddy Vanga)
- Anil Kapoor as Balbir Singh, Ranvijay's father
  - Kapoor also portrays Kailash Petkar, Balbir's body double
- Bobby Deol as Abrar Haque
  - Leon Ung as young Abrar
- Rashmika Mandanna as Geetanjali Singh, Ranvijay's wife
  - Diyara Valecha as young Geetanjali
- Triptii Dimri as Zoya Riaz
- Charu Shankar as Jyoti Singh, Ranvijay's mother
- Shakti Kapoor as PK Mishra, COO of Swastik Steels Corporation
- Prem Chopra as Dalbir Dodamal Singh aka "Bade Darji", Ranvijay's granduncle
- Babloo Prithiveeraj as Asrar Haque; Abrar, Abid and Aziz's first brother
- Saurabh Sachdeva as Abid Haque, Abrar and Aziz's second brother
- Madhu Raja as Rani Kaur aka "Beeji", Dalbir Singh's wife
- Suresh Oberoi as Rajdhir Dodamal Singh "Dadaji", Ranvijay's grandfather
- Saloni Batra as Reet Singh Malhotra, Ranvijay's elder sister
  - Neeven Ved as young Reet
- Anshul Chauhan as Roop Singh, Ranvijay's younger sister
  - Eva Chibber as young Roop
- Siddhant Karnick as Varun Pratap Malhotra, Reet's husband and Ranvijay's brother-in-law
- Maganti Srinath as Karthik Iyengar, Geetanjali's brother
- Upendra Limaye as Freddy Wilfred Patil
- Mathew Varghese as Shreepad Balaji Iyengar, Karthik and Geetanjali's father
- Indira Krishnan as Motika Iyengar, Karthik and Geetanjali's mother
- Kunal Thakur as Ahaan, Geetanjali's fiancé
- Mrinmayee Godbole as Dr. Amrita
- Davy Grewal as Sangram Singh, Ranvijay's elder cousin
- Vivek Sharma as Paali Singh, Ranvijay's younger cousin
- Gagandeep Singh as Sunny Singh, Ranvijay's younger cousin
- K. P. Singh as Vikram Singh, Ranvijay's cousin
- Amanjot Singh as Guru Singh, Ranvijay's elder cousin
- Manjot Singh as Rajbir "Royal" Singh, Ranvijay's younger cousin
- Avdeep Sidhu as Manjot Singh, Ranvijay's younger cousin
- Kamaljeet Rana as Balli Singh, Ranvijay's younger cousin
- Gursewak Singh Mander as Kirpal "KP" Singh, Ranvijay's younger cousin
- Butta Badbar as Butta Singh, Ranvijay's younger cousin
- Shabana Haroon as Niloofar Rahmani Haque, first wife of Abrar Haque
- Safina Shah as Mehrunnisa Baig Haque, second wife of Abrar Haque
- Mansi Taxak as Umm-e-Hani Fareen Haque, third wife of Abrar Haque
- Tannaz Davoodi as Shirin Bahar, singer in the song "Jamal Kudu"
- Avi Rakheja as Gautam, Roop's husband
- Sanvir Sachdeva as Abhay Singh, Geetanjali and Ranvijay's son
- Myreen Grover as Sonali Singh, Geetanjali and Ranvijay's daughter
- Sartaaj Kakkar as Reet's son

== Production ==
=== Development ===
In September 2019, it was reported that Sandeep Reddy Vanga would turn into a producer for his next directional venture in Bollywood. It was further reported that he would produce the venture along with Murad Khetani, Ashwin Varde, Bhushan Kumar and Krishan Kumar under Cine1 Studios and T-Series. On 10 October, the company's and Vanga's new production banner Bhadrakali Pictures announced their collaboration for Vanga's next directional; marking their second collaboration after Kabir Singh (2019). In early December, Vanga was reported to have approached Ranbir Kapoor to play the lead role in the film. ETimes reported that Kapoor was "keen" to work on the film, however, would finalize it only after hearing the final script, which was still progressing writing.

In June 2020 however, it was reported that Vanga met Kapoor in January and narrated another script, which was reportedly titled Devil. In late December, Anil Kapoor was reported to be part of the cast. On 1 January 2021, the company's made an official public announcement of the venture, revealing also the title of the film and the crew. In late April, Bobby Deol and Parineeti Chopra were cast, with the former playing lead antagonist role, while the latter plays lead actress role.

In March 2022, it was reported that Rashmika Mandanna was to dance in an item number for the film. The same month, Mandanna had replaced Chopra, as Vanga was not satisfied with the casting of Chopra during photoshoots. On 2 April, Mandanna's commitments were officially announced. Mandanna called it "a dream come true." Vanga cited Kill Bill as the inspiration for the film's action sequences. Similarly, Kapoor's rockstar look was inspired by Michael Jackson, as reported by hairstylist Aalim Hakim. In 2025, during the pre-release event of Thandel, Vanga revealed that it was the film's lead actor Naga Chaitanya whose style of long hair and beard as well as real-life outfits inspired the protagonist's looks. For the film's interval action sequence, Suresh Selvarajan spent 4 to 5 months designing a working model of a giant machine gun and creating 15,000 to 16,000 dummy bullets with the assistance of nearly 100 people.

In July 2025, Vanga revealed that the first cut of the film was 225 minutes long, while the second and his satisfactory cut was 210 minutes long. A week before the release, he came under pressure to further trim the film by some 7 minutes, something he eventually regretted after repeatedly watching the film during its theatrical run. The casting department for the film included Haseeb Bajwa, Jitendra Bhosale, Khushaal Pawar, and Vicky Kisan Mourya, with Naila Mughal handling the UK and international casting.

=== Filming ===
Principal photography began in Manali in April 2022. The second schedule took place in Mumbai in May 2022, with filming was held at the Pataudi Palace in July 2022. The next schedules were held in Delhi and Punjab. Filming resumed in England and Scotland in April 2023 with a schedule of 15–20 days. Filming was wrapped by July 2023.

== Music ==
The film score is composed by Harshavardhan Rameshwar, who scored Reddy's previous films Arjun Reddy and its Hindi remake Kabir Singh. The songs featured in the film are composed by Pritam, JAM8, Vishal Mishra, Jaani, Manan Bhardwaj, Shreyas Puranik, Ashim Kemson, Harshvardhan Rameshwar, Bhupinder Babbal. Lyrics were written by Manoj Muntashir, Raj Shekhar, Siddharth-Garima, Jaani, Manan Bhardwaj, Ashim Kemson and Bhupinder Babbal.

The album features eight tracks with four singles—"Hua Main", "Satranga", "Papa Meri Jaan" and "Arjan Vailly"—were released before the audio launch. The soundtrack to Animal was released at a music launch and fan experience event held on 24 November 2023 at Mehboob Studio in Mumbai. A deluxe edition album was released on 15 January 2024, featuring nine additional tracks.

== Marketing ==
The teaser was released on 28 September 2023 coinciding with Kapoor's birthday. Arijit Singh held a concert in Chandigarh where Ranbir Kapoor joined him to promote film with the song Satranga on 4 November 2023. During the semi-final of 2023 Cricket World Cup, Ranbir Kapoor attended the stadium to watch the match and for promotional activities of the film on 15 November 2023. The teaser was showcased on Burj Khalifa on 18 November 2023, they also conducted film promotions at Marq Club and Dubai's Global Village on the same day in Dubai. The trailer was released on 23 November 2023. The cast appeared on the Unstoppable, which premiered on Aha on 24 November 2023. They also appeared on Indian Idol. Before the pre-release event they conducted press conference tours in Hyderabad, Chennai, and Bengaluru. The film held its pre-release event in Hyderabad on 27 November 2023 with Mahesh Babu and S. S. Rajamouli as the chief guests.

== Release ==
=== Theatrical ===
Animal was initially set to release 5 October 2022 coinciding with Dussehra, then it was shifted to 11 August 2023 coinciding with Independence Day, but was postponed due to post-production and dubbing work, as well as to avoid clashing with Jailer, Gadar 2 and Oh My God 2. It was theatrically released on 1 December 2023 in standard and IMAX formats in Hindi with dubbed versions in Telugu, Tamil, Malayalam and Kannada languages. The film was released across 4000 screens in India, the screen count was impacted due to the clash with Sam Bahadur which was releasing on the same day.

The film had planned to premiere in North America on 30 November 2023, a day before its release. In the United States, it was screened in 888 theaters, marking the highest number for a Hindi film, surpassing the screen count of Brahmāstra: Part One – Shiva (2022) and Jawan (2023).

Animal received an A (adults only) certificate from the Central Board of Film Certification, a day prior to its trailer release, for strong bloody violence, profanity and some sexuality. It was classified 18 by the British Board of Film Classification for the same reason.

Passed with an R15+ rating, the film was released in Japan on 13 February 2026.

=== Distribution ===
AA Films acquired the theatrical rights of the film to distribute in North India and overseas. Sri Venkateswara Creations acquired the distribution rights for Andhra Pradesh and Telangana. E4 Entertainment and AP International acquired distribution rights for Tamil Nadu and Kerala. KVN Productions acquired distribution rights for Karnataka. Moksha Movies, Nirvana Cinemas and Prathyangira Cinemas acquired theatrical distribution rights for North America. Lax Cinema acquired the theatrical distribution rights for the Netherlands. The film's distributor in Japan is Geek Pictures.

=== Home media ===
The digital streaming rights of Animal were acquired by Netflix. The film was premiered on Netflix from 26 January 2024. While Vanga initially stated that it would have an additional 8 minutes of footage, it was later announced that Netflix would stream the theatrical cut with no additional scenes. An English dub, with actor Nakuul Mehta lending his voice to Ranbir Kapoor's character, and actress Samridhii Shukla lending her voice to Triptii Dimri's character; began streaming on 8 February 2024.

On Netflix, Animal became one of the most watched films with 11.7 million viewership in first two weeks, surpassing films Salaar: Part 1 – Ceasefire and Dunki. Animal ranked in the top 10 in six countries in the first week, 17 countries in the second, and continued to maintain the ranking in the following weeks in nine countries. For its television premiere, the film underwent multiple cuts from the CBFC to achieve a UA certificate on 27 February 2024. The makers had made 31 voluntary modifications and submitted a 199-minute cut, while the board made six more modifications, bringing down its duration to 191 minutes.

== Reception ==
=== Box office ===
Animal broke several box-office records for a Hindi film. The film had the fourth-biggest advance booking in Hindi cinema, and the third-highest for 2023 after Jawan and Pathaan. On its opening day, the film collected a total India net of ₹63.8 crore (US$6.8 million) second highest after Jawan, worldwide gross of ₹116 crore (US$12 million) including overseas gross of US$5.5 million (₹46 crore). Eventually it became the highest non-holiday opening of all time for a Hindi film breaking the previous record held by Ranbir Kapoor's Brahmāstra: Part One – Shiva. On its second day, netted over ₹67 crore and over ₹70 crore on third day in India for a three days total net collection of ₹201 crore and became one of the fastest Hindi film to achieve this after Jawan, making it third top opening weekend for Hindi films. Worldwide it earned over ₹100 crore (US$11 million) for three consecutive days during its opening weekend, for a total worldwide weekend gross collection of ₹356 crore (US$42.1 million). It had one of the highest Hindi net collection on its first Monday and Tuesday. In the first week it earned a total worldwide gross collection of ₹563 crore (US$60 million). On its 8th day, the film surpassed the lifetime worldwide collection of Sanju (2018) and becomes the highest-grossing film of Kapoor's career. On its 17th day, the film reached ₹500 crore net collection across all languages in India and on the same day the film crosses 3 crore footfalls in India. On its 35th day, the film reached ₹500 crore net in Hindi and ₹550 crore across all languages in India, eventually it became the second-highest net grossing Hindi film in India. Box Office India declared the film an All Time Blockbuster.

In the United States, the film was released alongside Renaissance: A Film by Beyoncé, Silent Night, Godzilla Minus One, and The Shift, and made $6.1 million from 888 theatres in its opening weekend, finishing in seventh place, behind the second weekend totals of Wish and Napoleon. Worldwide, it emerged as the No. 1 film on its opening weekend with the total of $42.1 million including the $13.88 million of international markets, surpassing all the films globally. In its first week the film earned over $19.2 million from international markets.

The film has grossed over ₹662.33 crore (US$71 million) in India and ₹255.49 crore (US$27 million) in overseas for a worldwide gross collection ranging between ₹917.82 crore (US$98 million). As of December 2025, it is the fourth highest-grossing Bollywood action film of all time as per Box Office India.

=== Critical response ===
Animal received mixed reviews from critics. On the review aggregator website Rotten Tomatoes, 26% of 27 critics' reviews are positive, with an average rating of 4.1/10. The website's consensus reads: "Overlong, overly violent, and thinly written, Animal goes wildly over the top to little avail." Metacritic, which uses a weighted average, assigned the film a score of 33 out of 100, based on 4 critics, indicating "generally unfavorable" reviews.

Awarding the film 4.5/5 stars, Bollywood Hungama praised "Ranbir Kapoor’s outstanding performance, clap-worthy massy scenes, and interval block." Sukanya Verma of Rediff gave 4/5 stars and wrote "Animal is relentless as a euphoric medley of feral rage and dance of the dysfunctional. The twists go on well until end credits as more blood is splattered our way." Ganesh Aaglave of Firstpost gave 3.5/5 stars and wrote, "Animal is an adrenaline experience which will have polarising views but you can't deny its entertaining quotient, breathtaking performances and storytelling." Puja Awasthi of The Week gave 3.5/5 stars and wrote "Animal for all its blood and gore, is the story of a son’s aching desire for his father’s approval. Why even its ballads are less romantic, more revenge. And its female characters for all their luminosity, are just props."

Monika Rawal Kukreja of Hindustan Times found it "an absolute massy, entertaining and extremely violent thriller which doesn't believe in conforming to the norms", while adding that the extreme violence might be off-putting for some. Titas Chowdhury of News18 gave 3.5/5 stars, labelled it "dark, loud and garish but also unapologetic", and thought that Ranbir Kapoor "breathes life into this undesirable character with a lot of charisma and swag". Abhimanyu Mathur of DNA India rated the film 3.5/5 and opined, "Animal takes everything that was problematic and increases it several notches. It is downright the most violent Hindi film I have seen, and also one of the most inherently toxic. The amazing part is that it is still very well made and entertaining, enhanced further by yet another great performance from Kapoor."

Conversely, Renuka Vyavahare of The Times of India gave 2.5/5 stars and termed the film "all swag and no substance derailed family drama"; she was critical of "Vanga's take on women or violence" but praised Ranbir's "raw sex appeal and unmatched intensity". India Today's Anvita Singh gave 2/5 stars and wrote "Ranbir Kapoor is stellar in problematic, paper-thin film." Nandini Ramnath of Scroll.in wrote "Ranbir is on fire, inhabiting to a frightening degree Vijay's delusional personal war. Reptile-eyed even at his smoldering best, Kapoor's career-best performance makes Animal tough to stomach, but equally difficult to ignore."

In a negative review, Shubhra Gupta of The Indian Express expressed disappointment that the performances of Ranbir and Anil Kapoor had been "wasted in this pointless, vile tale." She later named it the worst film of 2023. Saibal Chatterjee of NDTV gave 1.5/5 stars and wrote "The sickeningly violent father-son action drama rarely pauses for breath." Sowmya Rajendran of The News Minute gave 1.5/5 stars and wrote: "Sandeep Reddy Vanga's film has the kind of writing you'll find in BDSM erotica like Fifty Shades of Grey, but presented with the same earnestness of 'pure love' that we saw in Arjun Reddy." Pranati A S of Deccan Herald gave 1/5 stars and wrote "If you thought Arjun Reddy was toxic, then Animal will rattle your cage."

=== Industry reception ===
Amid the controversial reception about alleged glorification of violence, the film was defended by some filmmakers such as Ram Gopal Varma, Anurag Kashyap, Vikram Bhatt, and Sanjay Gupta as well as actresses Rashmika Mandanna, Sargun Mehta, Indira Krishnan, and Bhumi Pednekar. Mandanna and Krishnan were part of the film. Apart from this, actors Emraan Hashmi, Rajkummar Rao, Arshad Warsi, Puneet Issar and Unni Mukundan have also liked as well as defended the film.

Conversely, the film was criticised by filmmaker Kiran Rao, actresses Parvathy, Konkona Sen Sharma and Kangana Ranaut, and lyricists Javed Akhtar and Swanand Kirkire. Furthermore, filmmaker Vishal Bhardwaj had mixed reactions about the film. Vanga responded to the criticism from the actors and filmmakers with more criticism. Defending the film again, Mandanna also reiterated that it was just a film about a "messed-up character" and requested viewers to watch films without judging actors for the roles they play.

== Accolades ==
Award	Ceremony date	Category	Recipients	Result	Ref.
Filmfare Awards	28 January 2024	Best Film	T-Series Films, Cine1 Studios, Bhadrakali Pictures	Nominated	
Filmfare Awards	28 January 2024	Best Director	Sandeep Reddy Vanga	Nominated	
Filmfare Awards	28 January 2024	Best Editing	Sandeep Reddy Vanga	Nominated	
Filmfare Awards	28 January 2024	Best Actor	Ranbir Kapoor	Won	
Filmfare Awards	28 January 2024	Best Supporting Actor	Bobby Deol	Nominated	
Filmfare Awards	28 January 2024	Best Supporting Actor	Anil Kapoor	Nominated	
Filmfare Awards	28 January 2024	Best Supporting Actress	Triptii Dimri	Nominated	
Filmfare Awards	28 January 2024	Best Screenplay	Sandeep Reddy Vanga; Pranay Reddy Vanga; Suresh Bandaru	Nominated	
Filmfare Awards	28 January 2024	Best Music Director	Pritam; Vishal Mishra; Harshavardhan Rameshwar; Shreyas Puranik; Ashim Kemson; Bhupinder Babbal; Jaani	Won	
Filmfare Awards	28 January 2024	Best Lyricist	Siddharth–Garima – "Satranga"	Nominated	
Filmfare Awards	28 January 2024	Best Male Playback Singer	Arijit Singh – "Satranga"	Nominated	
Filmfare Awards	28 January 2024	Best Male Playback Singer	Bhupinder Babbal – "Arjan Vailly"	Won	
Filmfare Awards	28 January 2024	Best Background Score	Harshavardhan Rameshwar	Won	
Filmfare Awards	28 January 2024	Best Production Design	Suresh Selvarajan	Nominated	
Filmfare Awards	28 January 2024	Best Cinematography	Amit Roy	Nominated	
Filmfare Awards	28 January 2024	Best Sound Design	Sync Cinema	Won	
Filmfare Awards	28 January 2024	Best Costume Design	Sheetal Sharma	Nominated	
Filmfare Awards	28 January 2024	Best Action	Supreme Sundar	Nominated	
Filmfare Awards	28 January 2024	Best Special Effects	Do It Creative LTD; NY VFXWala; Visual Birds; Red Chillies VFX; Famous Studios	Nominated	
Zee Cine Awards	10 March 2024	Best Supporting Actor – Male	Anil Kapoor	Won	
Zee Cine Awards	10 March 2024	Best Actor In A Negative Role	Bobby Deol	Won	
Zee Cine Awards	10 March 2024	Best Screenplay	Sandeep Reddy Vanga, Pranay Reddy Vanga, Suresh Bandaru	Won	
Zee Cine Awards	10 March 2024	Best Editing	Sandeep Reddy Vanga	Won	
International Indian Film Academy Awards	28 September 2024	Best Film	Animal	Won	
International Indian Film Academy Awards	28 September 2024	Best Director	Sandeep Reddy Vanga	Nominated	
International Indian Film Academy Awards	28 September 2024	Best Actor	Ranbir Kapoor	Nominated	
International Indian Film Academy Awards	28 September 2024	Best Supporting Actor	Anil Kapoor	Won	
International Indian Film Academy Awards	28 September 2024	Best Actor in a Negative Role	Bobby Deol	Won	
International Indian Film Academy Awards	28 September 2024	Best Supporting Actress	Triptii Dimri	Nominated	
International Indian Film Academy Awards	28 September 2024	Best Music Director	Pritam; Vishal Mishra; Manan Bhardwaj; Shreyas Puranik; Jaani; Bhupinder Babbal; Ashim Kemson; Harshavardhan Rameshwar	Won	
International Indian Film Academy Awards	28 September 2024	Best Lyricist	Siddharth–Garima – "Satranga"	Won	
International Indian Film Academy Awards	28 September 2024	Best Male Playback Singer	Arijit Singh – "Satranga"	Nominated	
International Indian Film Academy Awards	28 September 2024	Best Male Playback Singer	Bhupinder Babbal – "Arjan Vailly"	Won	
International Indian Film Academy Awards	28 September 2024	Best Male Playback Singer	Vishal Mishra – "Pehle Bhi Main"	Nominated	
International Indian Film Academy Awards	28 September 2024	Best Female Playback Singer	Shreya Ghoshal – "Kashmir"	Nominated	
International Indian Film Academy Awards	28 September 2024	Best Editing	Sandeep Reddy Vanga	Won	
International Indian Film Academy Awards	28 September 2024	Best Background Score	Harshavardhan Rameshwar	Won	
International Indian Film Academy Awards	28 September 2024	Best Sound Design	Sachin Sudhakaran and Hariharan Muralidharan	Won	
National Film Awards	1 August 2025	Special Mention	M. R. Rajakrishnan	Won	
National Film Awards	1 August 2025	Best Music Direction	Harshavardhan Rameshwar	Won	
National Film Awards	1 August 2025	Best Sound Design	Sachin Sudhakaran and Hariharan Muralidharan	Won	

== Sequel ==
=== Animal Park ===
The film's post-credits scene alludes to a sequel titled Animal Park, which was confirmed by director Sandeep Reddy Vanga in December 2023. Shortly after the film's release, Vanga stated that the sequel would have a darker tone than its predecessor. Actor Ranbir Kapoor later stated that Vanga had prepared and narrated several scenes for the sequel.

In April 2024, Vanga stated that principal photography for Animal Park was expected to begin in 2026. Actor Saurabh Sachdeva, who portrayed Abid in the film, similarly indicated that filming could begin in 2026 or 2027 due to scheduling commitments of both Vanga and Kapoor for other projects, including Spirit and Ramayana. Kapoor later stated that Vanga had also discussed plans for a third installment in the franchise. In September 2025, Kapoor stated that filming for Animal Park is expected to begin in 2027.

== See also ==
- Bajrangi Bhaijaan
- Kabir Singh
- Arjun Reddy
- Dhurandhar
- List of highest-grossing Indian films
