= Siddharth–Garima =

Bollywood screenwriter duo

Siddharth Singh
- Born: Siddharth Singh; 27 November 1979 (age 46); Hyderabad, India.
- Occupations: Writer, lyricist
- Years active: 2011–present

Garima Wahal
- Born: Garima Wahal; 29 October 1979 (age 46); Jodhpur, India.
- Occupations: Writer, lyricist
- Years active: 2011–present

Siddharth–Garima are an Indian duo, composing of Siddharth Singh and Garima Wahal. They are known for their work as screenwriters and lyricists in Hindi-language films. Their works include Goliyon Ki Raasleela Ram-Leela (2013), Brothers (2015), Bajirao Mastani (2015), Toilet: Ek Prem Katha (2017), Raabta (2017), Padmaavat (2018), Batti Gul Meter Chalu (2018), Pal Pal Dil Ke Paas (2019), Kabir Singh (2019), Jabariya Jodi (2019), Velle (2021), Animal (2023), Dukaan (2024), Kalki 2898 AD (2024) and Dhadak 2 (2025).

== Filmography ==
Year	Title	Lyricist	Screenplay	Story	Dialogue	Director	Producer	Notes
2013	Goliyon Ki Raasleela Ram-Leela	Yes	Yes		Yes			Along with Sanjay Leela Bhansali
2015	Brothers				Yes			
2015	Bajirao Mastani	Yes						
2017	Raabta			Yes				
2017	Toilet: Ek Prem Katha	Yes		Yes				Only Siddharth Singh
2018	Padmaavat	Yes						
2018	Batti Gul Meter Chalu	Yes	Yes					
2019	Kabir Singh		Yes					Along with Sandeep Reddy Vanga
2019	Jabariya Jodi	Yes						
2019	Pal Pal Dil Ke Paas	Yes						
2021	Velle	Yes						
2023	Animal	Yes						Siddharth Singh starred as a church man
2024	Dukaan	Yes		Yes		Yes	Yes	
2024	Kalki 2898 AD	Yes						Hindi Dub
2025	Dhadak 2	Yes						
2025	Saale Aashiq					Yes	Yes	

=== Lyrics ===
Year	Film	Song	Composer
2013	Goliyon Ki Raasleela Ram-Leela	All songs	Sanjay Leela Bhansali
2015	Bajirao Mastani	"Deewani Mastani" "Mohe Rang Do Laal" "Albela Sajan Aayo Re" "Pinga"	Sanjay Leela Bhansali
2017	Toilet: Ek Prem Katha	All songs	Sachet-Parampara; Vicky Prasad; Manas Shikhar
2018	Padmaavat	"Nainowale Ne"	Sanjay Leela Bhansali
2018	Batti Gul Meter Chalu	"Gold Tamba" "Hard Hard" "Gange"	Anu Malik; Sachet-Parampara
2019	Jabariya Jodi	"Khwabfaroshi"	Sachet-Parampara
2019	Pal Pal Dil Ke Paas	All songs	Sachet-Parampara; Tanishk Bagchi
2021	Velle	"Udne Do" (Along with Bipin Das) "Khayali Ishq" "Raakh Ka Dariya" "Shukar Manavaan"	JAM8; Sohail Sen; Yug Bhusal
2023	Animal	"Satranga" "Satranga (Stripped)"	Shreyas Puranik
2024	Dukaan	All songs	Shreyas Puranik
2024	Kalki 2898 AD	"Hope of Shambala" "Keshava Madhava"	Santhosh Narayanan
2025	Dhadak 2	"Duniya Alag"	Shreyas Puranik
