= Shreyas Puranik =

- Born: Nagpur, Maharashtra, India
- Genres: Pop; Bollywood Music
- Occupations: Music Director; Composer
- Spouse(s): Aishwarya Bhandari, (married, 2021)

Shreyas Puranik is an Indian music composer. He was awarded Filmfare R.D Burman Award for upcoming music talent at the 69th Filmfare Awards. He received recognition for his composition 'Satranga' featured in the 2023 film Animal.

== Early life and career ==
Puranik was born and brought up in Nagpur and attended Somalwar Nikalas School School there and received training in Indian classical music while growing up. Puranik shifted to Mumbai to pursue formal training in music under the guidance of Suresh Wadkar and attended Mithibai College for higher education. He started his Bollywood career in 2014 by assisting film maker Sanjay Leela Bhansali in the music production of Bajirao Mastani's soundtrack and composed song 'Gajanana' for Bhansali's film Bajirao Mastani Puranik composed songs for films such as Photocopy, Lapachhapi and Faster Fene.

Puranik received recognition for his composition 'Satranga' featured in Animal movie, the song is written by Siddharth-Garima and was sung by Arijit Singh Puranik was awarded the Filmfare R. D. Burman Award for upcoming music talent for composing the 'Satranga' song.

== Personal life ==
Puranik married Aishwarya Bhandari in 2021 in Pune. Puranik had met Bhandari at Suresh Wadkar's music academy in 2011.

== Discography ==
Year	Film	Song	Singer(s)	Composer(s)	Lyrics	Notes
2015	Bajirao Mastani	"Gajanana"	Sukhwinder Singh	Shreyas Puranik	Prashant Ingole	
2016	Photocopy			Shreyas Puranik		Marathi film
2017	Hello	"Barse Barse"	Shreyas Puranik, Deepali Sathe	Anup Rubens		Hindi Dub
2019	Romeo Akbar Walter	"Allah Hu Allah"	Sameer Khan, Maneesh Singh, Shreyas Puranik, Jay Mehta, Mayur Sakhare, Tejas Mahure	Shabbir Ahmed		
2019	Malaal	"Aila Re"	Vishal Dadlani, Shreyas Puranik	Sanjay Leela Bhansali	Prashant Ingole	
2019	Malaal	"Nadh Khula"	Shreyas Puranik	Shreyas Puranik	Prashant Ingole	
2023	Animal	"Satranga"	Arijit Singh	Shreyas Puranik	Siddharth-Garima	
2023	Animal	"Satranga (Stripped)"	Shreyas Puranik	Shreyas Puranik	Siddharth-Garima	
2024	Dukaan	"Train Song"	Shreyas Puranik, Divya Kumar, Ananya Wadker, Meenal Jain, Prajakta Shukre, Apurva Nisshad	Shreyas Puranik	Siddharth-Garima	
2024	Dukaan	"Rang Maar De Holi Hai"	Sunidhi Chauhan	Shreyas Puranik	Siddharth-Garima	
2024	Dukaan	"Love Story Natthi"	Mohit Chauhan	Shreyas Puranik	Siddharth-Garima	
2024	Dukaan	"Maa Banne Wali Hoon"	Shreya Ghoshal, Aishwarya Bhandari	Shreyas Puranik	Siddharth-Garima	
2024	Dukaan	"Moh Naa Laage"	Arijit Singh	Shreyas Puranik	Siddharth-Garima	
2025	Dhadak 2	"Duniya Alag"	Arijit Singh	Shreyas Puranik	Siddharth-Garima	
