= List of Hindi songs recorded by Arijit Singh =

Indian singer Hindi discography

Songs of Arijit Singh
Playback singer
| Hindi songs | 560 |
| Bengali songs | 143 |
| Telugu songs | 25 |
| Tamil songs | 4 |
| Marathi songs | 4 |
| Kannada songs | 2 |
| Malayalam songs | 1 |
| Gujarati songs | 1 |
| Assamese songs | 1 |
| Punjabi songs | 1 |
| Total | 742 |

Composer
| Hindi songs | 22 |
| Bengali songs | 6 |
| Total | 28 |

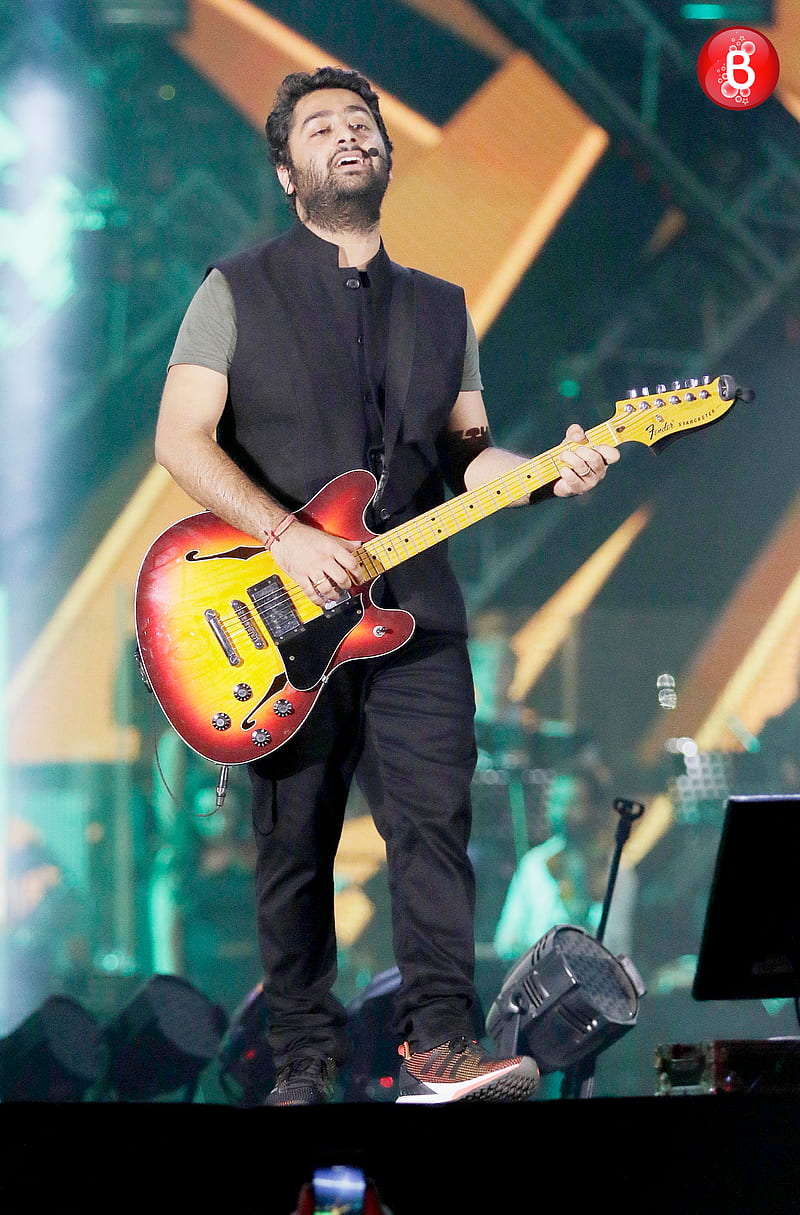
Arijit Singh performing at MMRDA ground, Mumbai in 2018

Indian playback singer Arijit Singh has recorded a majority of his songs in Hindi.

Arijit Singh made his Bollywood debut with Mithoon-composition, "Phir Mohabbat" from Murder 2, which was recorded in 2009 though released in 2011. The following year, he worked with Pritam for four of his films. He rendered four versions of the song "Raabta" in Agent Vinod. He also lent his voice for Chirantan Bhatt in 1920: Evil Returns and for Vishal–Shekhar in Shanghai, where the song "Duaa" from the latter fetched him Mirchi Music Award for Upcoming Male Playback Singer award and was nominated in the same category for "Phir Le Aya Dil" from Barfi!.

Singh rose to widespread prominence with the release of the song "Tum Hi Ho" from Aashiqui 2 (2013). The song fetched him several awards and nominations including his first Filmfare Awards. He worked with Jeet Gannguli for the rest of his tracks in the album. He further allied with Pritam, singing three tracks for Yeh Jawaani Hai Deewani. The duo collaborated with Shahid Kapoor, performing "Main Rang Sharbaton Ka" and "Dhokha Dhadi". Moreover, he dubbed for Shah Rukh Khan in the song "Kashmir Main Tu Kanyakumari" which was composed by Vishal–Shekhar. Apart from rendering the duet version of "Har Kisi Ko", the year marks his first collaboration with Sharib–Toshi and Sanjay Leela Bhansali by singing the song "Kabhi Jo Baadal Barse" for the former and the semi-classical number, "Laal Ishq" for the latter.

In 2014, Singh worked with Sajid–Wajid for the first time, performing two tracks of Main Tera Hero and the song "Raat Bhar". He rendered three re-mixed songs; Amit Trivedi's "Hungama Ho Gaya", Sharib–Toshi's "Samjhawan" and Arko Pravo Mukherjee's "Aaj Phir". The year marks his first collaboration with Vishal Bhardwaj, Tony Kakkar, Palak Muchhal, A. R. Rahman and Sachin–Jigar. During the year, he sang "Humdard", "Manwa Laage", "Sun Le Zara", "Sajde", two songs of Zid and three tracks of Holiday, to name a few. Gannguli-composed Muskurane garnered him most nominations from the year, while he received two Filmfare nominations for Suno Na Sangemarmar and the Sufi song Mast Magan. He has also recorded a Gujarati track, Satrangi Re from the movie Wrong Side Raju .

In 2015, Singh made his Tamil debut with the song "Neeye Vaazhkai Enben" from the film Pugazh. From the film Roy he sang "Sooraj Dooba Hain". Composed by Amaal Mallik and penned by Kumaar, it won him his 2nd Filmfare Award. He also sang "Agar Tum Saath Ho" with Alka Yagnik, from the movie Tamasha which is composed by A. R. Rahman and written by Irshad Kamil. From Khamoshiyan he sang the title track and two other songs. He also sang the title track of Hamari Adhuri Kahani for Jeet Ganguli. Besides working with Chirantan Bhatt on "Teri Meri Kahaani" and Sachin–Jigar on "Chunar", he also lent his voice to "Saware" from Phantom. Arijit was the lead vocalist on the soundtrack of the film Dilwale. He sang "Janam Janam" and "Gerua" with Antara Mitra and the dance number "Tukur Tukur".

In 2016, he made his Gujarati debut with the song "Satrangi Re" from the film Wrong Side Raju. He sang "Soch Na Sake" from Airlift, "Sanam Re" - the title track of the movie Sanam Re, composed and written by Mithoon and "Yeh Fitoor Mera" written by Swanand Kirkire and composed by Amit Trivedi from Fitoor. He was the key vocalist in the movies Raaz Reboot and Ae Dil Hai Mushkil. From Raaz Reboot he sang "Lo Maan Liya", the mellow melody "Raaz Aakhein Teri" and "Yaad Hain Na". He rendered "Channa Mereya" and "Ae Dil Hai Mushkil" from Ae Dil Hai Mushkil. Singh delivered another chartbuster hit "Nashe Si Chadh Gayi" from Befikre. He performed "Naina" from Dangal, composed by Pritam and penned by Amitabh Bhattacharya.

In 2017, he sang the romantic duet "Zaalima" from the movie Raees. He lent his voice for "Roke Na Ruke Naina", composed by Amaal Mallik from the film Badrinath Ki Dulhania and the love ballad "Phir Bhi Tumko Chaahunga", composed by Mithoon, with lyrics by Manoj Muntashir from Half Girlfriend. He was the lead vocalist on the film Raabta singing "Ik Vaari Aa", composed by Pritam, lyrics are penned by Amitabh Bhattacharya. Singh was the lead singer of the Jagga Jasoos Soundtrack singing "Ullu ka Pattha", "Galti Se Mistake", "Jhumri Talaiyya" and also "Phir Wahi". All songs have been composed by Pritam and written by Amitabh Bhattacharya. He also sang "Hawayein" from Jab Harry Met Sejal.

In 2018, he sang "Binte Dil" for the film Padmaavat written by A. M. Turaz and composed by Sanjay Leela Bhansali. It fetched him National Film Award for Best Male Playback Singer. From the movie Kedarnath, he sang "Jaan Nissar" and a duet song "Qaafirana" with Nikhita Gandhi, both the songs composed by Amit Trivedi and lyrics penned by Amitabh Bhattacharya. In 2019, his song "Ve Maahi" with Asees Kaur from film Kesari composed by Tanishk Bagchi was released. He sang "First Class" with Neeti Mohan and title song "Kalank" from film Kalank composed by Pritam Chakraborty and penned by Amitabh Bhattacharya. "Kalank" earned him his sixth Filmfare Award and fifth in a row. He rendered "Khairiyat" from the film Chhichhore. His song "Tujhe Kitna Chahne Lage hum" from Kabir Singh in 2019. In October his song "Ghungroo" with Shilpa Rao was released from the movie, War. In 2020, he sang three songs released from the film Love Aaj Kal : "Shayad", "Haan Tum Ho" and "Haan Main Galat". Singh released his first single "Rihaa" also sang the songs "Aabaad Barbaad" and "Hardum Humdum" from Ludo, besides many others.

In 2021, he composed music for a film for the first time in Pagglait under his banner Oriyon Music. He sang "Tumse Bhi Zyada" from the movie Tadap, composed by Pritam and lyrics penned by Irshad Kamil. Singh also lent his voice for the song "Mere Yaara" from 83 and "Rait Zara Si" from Atrangi Re. In 2022, he sang "Kesariya" and a duet "Deva Deva" with Jonita Gandhi from the movie Brahmāstra. "Kesariya" earned him his seventh Filmfare Award and it also became the first Indian song to cross 300 million and 400 million streams on Spotify. His song "Kitni Haseen Hogi" composed by Mithoon was released from the movie HIT: The First Case. He sang "Apna Bana Le", composed by Sachin-Jigar from Bhediya. Singh's version of "Mere Dholna" and a duet song "Hum Nashe Mein Toh Nahin" with Tulsi Kumar were released from Bhool Bhulaiyaa 2.

== 2007 ==
=== Non-film songs ===
| TV Series/Album | No. | Song | Composer(s) | Writer(s) | Co-Singer(s) | Note |
|---|---|---|---|---|---|---|
| High School Musical 2 (D) | 1 | "All for One (Aaja Nachle)" | Shankar–Ehsaan–Loy | Sameer | Tarannum Malik, Earl D'Souza, Raja Hasan, Shilpa Rao | Indian version |

== 2011 ==
=== Film songs ===
| Film | No | Song | Composer(s) | Writer(s) | Co-Singer(s) | Ref. | Note |
|---|---|---|---|---|---|---|---|
| Murder 2 | 1 | "Phir Mohabbat" | Mithoon | Sayeed Quadri | Mohd. Irfan, Saim Bhatt | | |

=== Non-film songs ===
| TV Series/Album | No. | Song | Composer(s) | Writer(s) | Co-Singer(s) | Note |
|---|---|---|---|---|---|---|
| A Foreign Affair | 2 | "Khuda" | Spyro Gyra, Sandeep Chowta | — | Arijit Singh | — |
| Phoenyx: Phase 1 | 3 | "Ka Karoon Sajni (Dubstep)" | Rajesh Roshan (Recreated by Phoenyx) | Amit Khanna | — | — |
| Phoenyx: Phase 1 | 4 | "Ka Karoon Sajni" | Rajesh Roshan (Recreated by Phoenyx) | Amit Khanna | — | — |

== 2012 ==
=== Film songs ===
| Film | No | Song | Composer(s) | Writer(s) | Co-Singer(s) | Ref. | Note |
|---|---|---|---|---|---|---|---|
| Players | 2 | "Jhoom Jhoom Ta Hun Main" (Film Version) | Pritam Chakraborty | Ashish Pandit | | | |
| Agent Vinod | 3 | "Raabta" | Pritam Chakraborty | Amitabh Bhattacharya | | | |
| Agent Vinod | 4 | "Raabta" (Kehte Hain Khuda Ne) | Pritam Chakraborty | Amitabh Bhattacharya | Shreya Ghoshal | | |
| Agent Vinod | 5 | "Raabta" (Night In a Motel) | Pritam Chakraborty | Amitabh Bhattacharya | Aditi Singh Sharma | | |
| Agent Vinod | 6 | "Raabta" (Siyaah Raatein) | Pritam Chakraborty | Amitabh Bhattacharya | Hamsika Iyer | | |
| Cocktail | 7 | "Yaariyan" (Reprise Version) | Pritam Chakraborty | Irshad Kamil | Sunidhi Chauhan | | |
| Barfi! | 8 | "Phir Le Aya Dil" (Reprise) | Pritam Chakraborty | Sayeed Quadri | | | |
| Barfi! | 9 | "Saawali Si Raat" | Pritam Chakraborty | Swanand Kirkire | | | |
| Barfi! | 10 | "Fataafati" | Pritam Chakraborty | Amitabh Bhattacharya | Nakash Aziz, Pritam Chakraborty, Ranbir Kapoor | | Released separately as a promotional song |
| Shanghai | 11 | "Duaa" | Vishal–Shekhar | Kumaar | Nandini Srikar | | |
| 1920: Evil Returns | 12 | "Uska Hi Banana" | Chirantan Bhatt | Junaid Wasi | | | |

=== Non-film songs ===
| TV Series/Album | No. | Song | Composer(s) | Writer(s) | Co-Singer(s) | Note |
|---|---|---|---|---|---|---|
| Teri Meri Love Stories | 5 | "Teri Bindiya Re (Remake)" | S. D. Burman (Recreated by Pranay Rijiya) | Majrooh Sultanpuri | Namrata Vedi | Originally performed by Mohammed Rafi and Lata Mangeshkar from the film Abhimaan |
| Madhubala – Ek Ishq Ek Junoon | 6 | "Hum Hai Deewane" | Ashish Rego | Vibha Tiwari | Komal Rizvi | TV series |
| Na Bole Tum Na Maine Kuch Kaha | 7 | "Tere Ishq Mein" | — | — | — | TV series |

== 2013 ==
=== Film songs ===
| Film | No | Song | Composer(s) | Writer(s) | Co-Singer(s) | Ref. | Note |
|---|---|---|---|---|---|---|---|
| 3G | 13 | "Khalbali" | Mithoon | Shellee | Shilpa Rao, Tochi Raina | | |
| Aashiqui 2 | 14 | "Tum Hi Ho" | Mithoon | Mithoon | | | |
| Aashiqui 2 | 15 | "Meri Aashiqui" | Mithoon | Mithoon | Palak Muchhal | | |
| Aashiqui 2 | 16 | "Chahun Main Ya Naa" | Jeet Gannguli | Irshad Kamil | Palak Muchhal | | |
| Aashiqui 2 | 17 | "Hum Mar Jayenge" | Jeet Gannguli | Irshad Kamil | Tulsi Kumar | | |
| Aashiqui 2 | 18 | "Milne Hai Mujhse Aayi" | Jeet Gannguli | Irshad Kamil | | | |
| Aashiqui 2 | 19 | "Aasan Nahin Yahan" | Jeet Gannguli | Irshad Kamil | | | |
| Yeh Jawaani Hai Deewani | 20 | "Dilliwaali Girlfriend" | Pritam Chakraborty | Kumaar | Sunidhi Chauhan | | |
| Yeh Jawaani Hai Deewani | 21 | "Kabira" (Encore Version) | Pritam Chakraborty | Amitabh Bhattacharya | Harshdeep Kaur | | |
| Yeh Jawaani Hai Deewani | 22 | "Ilahi" | Pritam Chakraborty | Amitabh Bhattacharya | | | |
| Chennai Express | 23 | "Kashmir Main Tu Kanyakumari" | Vishal–Shekhar | Amitabh Bhattacharya | Sunidhi Chauhan, Neeti Mohan | | |
| Phata Poster Nikhla Hero | 24 | "Main Rang Sharbaton Ka" (Reprise Version) | Pritam Chakraborty | Irshad Kamil | | | |
| Boss | 25 | "Har Kisi Ko" (Duet Version) | Chirantan Bhatt (Original by Kalyanji–Anandji) | Manoj Yadav | Neeti Mohan | | |
| Shahid | 26 | "Beparwah" | Faizan Hussain & Agnel Roman | Shellee | | | |
| Mickey Virus | 27 | "Tose Naina" | Hanif Shaikh | Hanif Shaikh | | | |
| Ishk Actually | 28 | "Aye Dil Bata" | Chirantan Bhatt | Manoj Yadav | | | |
| Goliyon Ki Raasleela: Ram-Leela | 29 | "Laal Ishq" | Sanjay Leela Bhansali | Siddharth-Garima | | | |
| Club 60 | 30 | "Pal Pal" | Pranit Gedham | Sanjay Tripathy | | | |
| Club 60 | 31 | "Pal Pal" (Sad Version) | Pranit Gedham | Sanjay Tripathy | | | |
| R... Rajkumar | 32 | "Dhokha Dhadi" | Pritam Chakraborty | Neelesh Misra | Palak Muchhal | | |
| Jackpot | 33 | "Kabhi Jo Baadal Barse" (Male Version) | Sharib–Toshi | Turaz–Azeem Shirazi | | | |
| Jackpot | 34 | "Kabhi Jo Baadal Barse" (Remix) | Sharib–Toshi | Turaz–Azeem Shirazi | | | Remix by Rishi Rich |
| Jackpot | 35 | "Kabhi Jo Baadal Barse" (Remix) | Sharib–Toshi | Turaz–Azeem Shirazi | | | Remix by Maxi Priest |

== 2014 ==
=== Film songs ===
| Film | No | Song | Composer(s) | Writer(s) | Co-Singer(s) | Ref. | Note.... |
|---|---|---|---|---|---|---|---|
| Yaariyan | 36 | "Love Me Thoda Aur" | Pritam Chakarborty | Irshad Kamil | Monali Thakur, Nikhil D'Souza | | |
| Karle Pyaar Karle | 37 | "Teri Saanson Mein" | Rashid Khan | Rashid Khan | Palak Muchhal, Amit Mishra | | |
| Karle Pyaar Karle | 38 | "Tanhaai" | Mehmood Arafat and Rashid Khan | Rayyan Ameen | Sahil Rayyan, Amnah Noor | | |
| One by Two | 39 | "Khuda Na Khasta" | Shankar–Ehsaan–Loy | Amitabh Bhattacharya | | | |
| Heartless | 40 | "Main Dhoondne Ko" | Gaurav Dagaonkar | Arafat Mahmood | | | |
| Heartless | 41 | "Main Dhoondne Ko" (Reprise Version) | Gaurav Dagaonkar | Arafat Mahmood | | | |
| Gunday | 42 | "Jiya" | Sohail Sen | Irshad Kamil | | | |
| Shaadi Ke Side Effects | 43 | "Desi Romance" | Pritam Chakraborty | Swanand Kirkire | Suchi | | |
| Queen | 44 | "Hungama Ho Gaya" | Laxmikant–Pyarelal (Remixed by Amit Trivedi) | Verma Malik | Asha Bhosle | | |
| Queen | 45 | "Taake Jhanke" | Amit Trivedi | Anvita Dutt | | | |
| Dishkiyaoon | 46 | "Tu Hi Hai Aashiqui" (Solo Version) | Palash Muchhal | Sanamjit Talwar | | | |
| Dishkiyaoon | 47 | "Tu Hi Hai Aashiqui" (Duet Version) | Palash Muchhal | Sanamjit Talwar | Palak Muchhal | | |
| Dishkiyaoon | 48 | "Tu Hi Hai Aashiqui" (Remix Version) | Palash Muchhal | Sanamjit Talwar | Altamash Faridi | | |
| Youngistaan | 49 | "Suno Na Sangemarmar" | Jeet Gannguli | Kausar Munir | | | |
| Youngistaan | 50 | "Suno Na Sangemarmar" (Remix Version) | Jeet Gannguli | Kausar Munir | | | |
| Main Tera Hero | 51 | "Palat – Tera Hero Idhar Hai" | Sajid–Wajid | Kausar Munir | | | |
| Main Tera Hero | 52 | "Palat – Tera Hero Idhar Hai" (Remix Version) | Sajid–Wajid | Kausar Munir | | | |
| Main Tera Hero | 53 | "Shanivaar Raati" | Sajid–Wajid | Kumaar | Shalmali Kholgade | | |
| Main Tera Hero | 54 | "Shanivaar Raati" (Remix Version) | Sajid–Wajid | Kumaar | Shalmali Kholgade | | |
| 2 States | 55 | "Mast Magan" | Shankar–Ehsaan–Loy | Amitabh Bhattacharya | Chinmayi Sripada | | |
| Samrat & Co | 56 | "Shukr Tera" | Mithoon | Mithoon | Chinmayi Sripada | | |
| Heropanti | 57 | "Raat Bhar" | Sajid–Wajid | Kausar Munir | Shreya Ghoshal | | |
| Kochadaiiyaan | 58 | "Dil Chaspiya" | A. R. Rahman | Irshad Kamil | Jonita Gandhi | | Dubbed |
| CityLights | 59 | "Muskurane" (Romantic Version) | Jeet Gannguli | Rashmi Singh | | | |
| CityLights | 60 | "Soney Do" | Jeet Gannguli | Rashmi Singh | | | |
| CityLights | 61 | "Ek Charraiya" | Jeet Gannguli | Rashmi Singh | | | |
| Holiday: A Soldier Is Never Off Duty | 62 | "Shaayraana" | Pritam Chakraborty | Irshad Kamil | | | |
| Holiday: A Soldier Is Never Off Duty | 63 | "Ashq Na Ho" | Pritam Chakraborty | Irshad Kamil | | | |
| Holiday: A Soldier Is Never Off Duty | 64 | "Blame The Night" | Pritam Chakraborty | Irshad Kamil | Aditi Singh Sharma, Piyush Kapoor | | |
| Fugly | 65 | "Dhuaan" | Prashant Vadhyar | Arshia Nahid | Pawni Pandey | | |
| Ek Villain | 66 | "Humdard" | Mithoon | Mithoon | | | |
| Humpty Sharma Ki Dulhania | 67 | "Samjhawan" | Jawad Ahmad (Recreated by Sharib−Toshi) | Ahmad Anees (Additional lyrics by Kumaar) | Shreya Ghoshal | | |
| Hate Story 2 | 68 | "Aaj Phir" | Laxmikant-Pyarelal (Recreated by Arko Pravo Mukherjee) | Aziz Qaisi & Arko Pravo Mukherjee | Samira Koppikar | | |
| Hate Story 2 | 69 | "Aaj Phir" (Remix Version) | Laxmikant-Pyarelal (Recreated by Arko Pravo Mukherjee) | Aziz Qaisi & Arko Pravo Mukherjee | Samira Koppikar | | |
| Hate Story 2 | 70 | "Hai Dil Ye Mera" | Mithoon | Mithoon | | | |
| Hate Story 2 | 71 | "Hai Dil Ye Mera" (Remix Version) | Mithoon | Mithoon | | | |
| Singham Returns | 72 | "Sun Le Zara" | Jeet Gannguli | Sandeep Nath | | | |
| Raja Natwarlal | 73 | "Tere Hoke Rahenge" | Yuvan Shankar Raja | Irshad Kamil | | | |
| Raja Natwarlal | 74 | "Tere Hoke Rahenge (DJ Notorious Club Mix)" | Yuvan Shankar Raja | Irshad Kamil | | | |
| Mary Kom | 75 | "Sukoon Mila" | Shivam Pathak | Sandeep Singh | | | |
| Mary Kom | 76 | "Saudebaazi" | Shivam Pathak | Prashant Ingole | | | |
| Creature 3D | 77 | "Sawan Aaya Hai" | Tony Kakkar | Tony Kakkar | | | |
| Creature 3D | 78 | "Mohabbat Barsa De" | Tony Kakkar | Tony Kakkar | Arjun, Samira Koppikar | | |
| Haider | 79 | "Khul Kabhi Toh" | Vishal Bhardwaj | Gulzar | | | |
| Haider | 80 | "Gulon Mein Rang Bhare" | Vishal Bhardwaj | Faiz Ahmed Faiz | | | |
| Happy New Year | 81 | "Manwa Laage" | Vishal–Shekhar | Irshad Kamil | Shreya Ghoshal | | |
| Kill Dil | 82 | "Sajde" | Shankar–Ehsaan–Loy | Gulzar | Nihira Joshi | | |
| Happy Ending | 83 | "Jaise Mera Tu" | Sachin–Jigar | Priya Saraiya | Priya Saraiya | | |
| Titoo MBA | 84 | "O Soniye" | Arjuna Harjai | Surabhi Dashputra | Vibha Saraf | | |
| Titoo MBA | 85 | "Kyu Hua" | Arjuna Harjai | Kumaar | | | |
| Hum Hai Teen Khurafaati | 86 | "Dil Jugaadu" | Kashi-Richard | Shweta Raaj | | | |
| Zid | 87 | "Saanson Ko" | Sharib–Toshi | Shakeel Azmi | | | |
| Zid | 88 | "Mareez-E-Ishq" | Sharib–Toshi | Shakeel Azmi | | | |

=== Non-film songs ===
| TV Series/Album | No. | Song | Composer(s) | Writer(s) | Co-Singer(s) | Note |
|---|---|---|---|---|---|---|
| Kuchh Dil Ne Kaha | 8 | "Rishton Ke Manzar" | Anup Jalota | Harsh Brahmbhatt | — | — |
| My Name Is Ranveer Ching | 9 | "My Name Is Ranveer Ching" | Shankar–Ehsaan–Loy | Gulzar | Ranveer Singh | Advertisement |

== 2015 ==
=== Film songs ===
| Film | No | Song | Composer(s) | Writer(s) | Co-Singer(s) | Ref. | Note |
|---|---|---|---|---|---|---|---|
| I | 89 | "Tu Chale" | A. R. Rahman | Irshad Kamil | Shreya Ghoshal | | Dubbed |
| Khamoshiyan | 90 | "Khamoshiyan" | Jeet Gannguli | Rashmi Singh | | | |
| Khamoshiyan | 91 | "Khamoshiyan" (Unplugged Version) | Jeet Gannguli | Rashmi Singh | | | |
| Khamoshiyan | 92 | "Baatein Ye Kabhi Na" (Male Version) | Jeet Gannguli | Sayeed Quadri | | | |
| Khamoshiyan | 93 | "Tu Har Lamha" | Bobby–Imran | Sayeed Quadri | | | |
| Khamoshiyan | 94 | "Tu Har Lamha" (Remix by DJ Angel) | Bobby–Imran | Sayeed Quadri | | | |
| Roy | 95 | "Sooraj Dooba Hain" | Amaal Mallik | Kumaar | Aditi Singh Sharma, Armaan Malik | | |
| Roy | 96 | "Sooraj Dooba Hain (Version 2)" | Amaal Mallik | Kumaar | Aditi Singh Sharma, Armaan Malik | | |
| Badlapur | 97 | "Judaai" | Sachin–Jigar | Dinesh Vijan, Priya Saraiya | Rekha Bhardwaj, Sachin–Jigar | | |
| NH10 | 98 | "Le Chal Mujhe" (Reprise version) | Bann Chakraborty, Abhiruchi Chand | Bann Chakraborty | | | |
| Hunterrr | 99 | "Chori Chori" | Khamosh Shah | Khamosh Shah | Sona Mohapatra | | |
| Dilliwali Zaalim Girlfriend | 100 | "Janib" (Duet Version) | Jatinder Shah | Kumaar | Sunidhi Chauhan | | |
| Ek Paheli Leela | 101 | "Deewana Tera" | Meet Bros | Kumaar | | | |
| Ek Paheli Leela | 102 | "Main Hoon Deewana Tera – Remix" | Meet Bros | Kumaar | | | |
| Mr. X | 103 | "Teri Khushboo" (Male Version) | Jeet Gannguli | Rashmi Singh | | | |
| Gabbar is Back | 104 | "Teri Meri Kahaani" | Chirantan Bhatt | Manoj Yadav | Palak Muchhal | | |
| Ishqedarriyaan | 105 | "Judaa" | Jaidev Kumar | Kumaar | | | |
| Hamari Adhuri Kahani | 106 | "Hamari Adhuri Kahani" | Jeet Gannguli | Rashmi Virag | | | |
| ABCD 2 | 107 | "Chunar" | Sachin–Jigar | Mayur Puri | | | |
| Guddu Rangeela | 108 | "Sooiyan" | Amit Trivedi | Irshad Kamil | Chinmayi Sripada | | |
| Drishyam | 109 | "Kya Pataa" | Vishal Bhardwaj | Gulzar | | | |
| All Is Well | 110 | "Baaton Ko Teri" | Himesh Reshammiya | Shabbir Ahmed | | | |
| Phantom | 111 | "Saware" | Pritam Chakraborty | Amitabh Bhattacharya | | | |
| Calendar Girls | 112 | "Khwaishein" | Amaal Mallik | Kumaar | | | |
| Talvar | 113 | "Shaam Ke Saaye" | Vishal Bhardwaj | Gulzar | | | |
| Singh Is Bliing | 114 | "Aaja Mahi" (Unplugged Version) | Manj Musik | Manj Musik | Manj Musik | | |
| Wedding Pullav | 115 | "The Wedding Pullav" | Salim–Sulaiman | Irfan Siddiqui | Salim Merchant | | |
| Wedding Pullav | 116 | "Oh Jaaniya" (Version 2) | Salim–Sulaiman | Irfan Siddiqui | Shreya Ghoshal | | |
| Shaandaar | 117 | "Senti Wali Mental" | Amit Trivedi | Amitabh Bhattacharya | Neeti Mohan, Swanand Kirkire, Amit Trivedi | | |
| Tamasha | 118 | "Agar Tum Saath Ho" | A. R. Rahman | Irshad Kamil | Alka Yagnik | | |
| Tamasha | 119 | "Wat Wat Wat" | A. R. Rahman | Irshad Kamil | Sashwat Singh | | |
| Tamasha | 120 | "Wat Wat" (Vengeance Mix) | A. R. Rahman | Irshad Kamil | Sashwat Singh | | |
| Bajirao Mastani | 121 | "Aayat" | Sanjay Leela Bhansali | A. M. Turaz, Nasir Faraaz | Altamash Faridi, Mujtaba Aziz Naza, Shadab Faridi, Farhan Sabri | | |
| Dilwale | 122 | "Gerua" | Pritam Chakraborty | Amitabh Bhattacharya | Antara Mitra | | |
| Dilwale | 123 | "Janam Janam" | Pritam Chakraborty | Amitabh Bhattacharya | Antara Mitra | | |
| Dilwale | 124 | "Daayre" | Pritam Chakraborty | Amitabh Bhattacharya | | | |
| Dilwale | 125 | "Tukur Tukur" | Pritam Chakraborty | Amitabh Bhattacharya | Kanika Kapoor, Neha Kakkar, Siddharth Mahadevan, Nakash Aziz | | |
| Dilwale | 126 | "Theme of Dilwale" (DJ Chetas Mix) | Pritam Chakraborty | Amitabh Bhattacharya | | | |

=== Non-film songs ===
| TV Series/Album | No. | Song | Composer(s) | Writer(s) | Co-Singer(s) | Note |
|---|---|---|---|---|---|---|
| Chal Wahan Jaate Hain | 10 | "Chal Wahan Jaate Hain" | Amaal Mallik | Rashmi Virag | — | — |
| Power Couple | 11 | "Pehli Jhalak" | Sachin–Jigar | Mayur Puri | Shalmali Kholgade | TV series |
| Hyundai Elite i20 | 12 | "Drive Mein Junoon" | Clinton Cerejo | Nirmika Singh | Clinton Cerejo | Advertisement |

== 2016 ==
=== Film songs ===
| Film | No | Song | Composer(s) | Writer(s) | Co-Singer(s) | Ref. | Note |
|---|---|---|---|---|---|---|---|
| Airlift | 127 | Soch Na Sake | Amaal Mallik | Kumaar | Tulsi Kumar | | |
| Airlift | 128 | Soch Na Sake | Amaal Mallik | Kumaar | | | |
| Airlift | 129 | Dil Cheez Tujhe Dedi | Ankit Tiwari | Kumaar | | | |
| Ghayal Once Again | 130 | "Khuda Hai Tere Andar" | Shankar–Ehsaan–Loy | Amitabh Bhattacharya | | | |
| Sanam Teri Kasam | 131 | "Tera Chehra Jab Nazar Aye" | Himesh Reshammiya | Shabbir Ahmed | | | |
| Sanam Teri Kasam | 132 | "Main Teri Yaadon Mein" | Himesh Reshammiya | Subrat Sinha | | | |
| Fitoor | 133 | "Yeh Fitoor Mera" | Amit Trivedi | Swanand Kirkire | | | |
| Sanam Re | 134 | "Sanam Re" | Mithoon | Mithoon | | | |
| Sanam Re | 135 | "Gazab Ka Hai Ye Din" | Amaal Mallik | Manoj Muntashir | | | |
| Bollywood Diaries | 136 | "Manwa Behrupiya" | Vipin Patwa | Dr. Sagar | Vipin Patwa | | |
| Love Shagun | 137 | "Hairaani" | Rishi Siddharth | Siddharth Amit Bhavsar | Sakina Khan | | |
| Jai Gangaajal | 138 | "Sab Dhan Maati" (Radio Mix) | Salim–Sulaiman | Manoj Muntashir | | | |
| Teraa Surroor | 139 | "Wafa Ne Bewafai" | Himesh Reshammiya | Sameer | Neeti Mohan, Suzanne D'Mello | | |
| Kapoor & Sons | 140 | "Bolna" | Tanishk Bagchi | Dr. Devender Kafir | Asees Kaur | | |
| Baaghi | 141 | "Girl I Need You" | Meet Bros | Kumaar | Meet Bros, Roach Killa, Khushboo Grewal | | |
| Traffic | 142 | "Neki Ki Raah" | Mithoon | Mithoon | Mithoon | | |
| One Night Stand | 143 | "Ijazat" | Meet Bros | Shabbir Ahmed | | | |
| Azhar | 144 | "Itni Si Baat Hain" | Pritam Chakraborty | Manoj Yadav | Antara Mitra | | |
| Sarbjit | 145 | "Salamat" | Amaal Mallik | Rashmi Virag | Tulsi Kumar | | |
| Sarbjit | 146 | "Nindiya" | Shashi-Shivamm | Sandeep Singh | | | |
| Fever | 147 | "Bas Ek Baar" | Rahul Bhatt | Rahul Bhatt | | | |
| Fever | 148 | "Besambhle" | Tanishk Bagchi | A. M. Turaz | | | |
| Shorgul | 149 | "Tere Bina" | Niladri Kumar | Kapil Sibal | | | |
| Mohenjo Daro | 150 | "Mohenjo Mohenjo" | A. R. Rahman | Javed Akhtar | A. R. Rahman, Bela Shende, Sanah Moidutty | | |
| Rustom | 151 | "Dekha Hazaro Dafaa" | Jeet Gannguli | Manoj Muntashir | Palak Muchhal | | |
| Rustom | 152 | "Dhal Jaun Main (Version 2)" | Jeet Gannguli | Manoj Muntashir | Aakanksha Sharma | | Song released in October 2019; three years after film's release. |
| Happy Bhag Jayegi | 153 | "Zara Si Dosti" | Sohail Sen | Mudassar Aziz | | | |
| Akira | 154 | "Purza" | Vishal–Shekhar | Manoj Muntashir | | | |
| Raaz Reboot | 155 | "Lo Maan Liya" | Jeet Gannguli | Kausar Munir | | | |
| Raaz Reboot | 156 | "Yaad Hai Na" | Jeet Gannguli | Kausar Munir | | | |
| Raaz Reboot | 157 | "Raaz Aankhein Teri" | Jeet Gannguli | Rashmi Virag | | | |
| Days of Tafree | 158 | "Main Hu Tu Ho" | Bobby-Imran | Aditya Shri Hari, Booby-Imran | | | |
| M. S. Dhoni: The Untold Story | 159 | "Phir Kabhi" | Amaal Mallik | Manoj Muntashir | | | |
| M. S. Dhoni: The Untold Story | 160 | "Phir Kabhi" (Reprise Version) | Amaal Mallik | Manoj Muntashir | | | |
| Tutak Tutak Tutiya | 161 | "Chalte Chalte" | Vishal Mishra | Manoj Yadav | | | |
| Fuddu | 162 | "Tum Tum Tum Ho" | Rana Mazumder | Panchhi | Sunidhi Chauhan | | |
| Fuddu | 163 | "Tum Tum Tum Ho" (Punjabi Version) | Sumeet Bellary | Satya Khare, Panchhi | Yasser Desai, Sumedha Karmahe | | |
| Shivaay | 164 | "Darkhaast" | Mithoon | Sayeed Quadri | Sunidhi Chauhan, Mithoon | | |
| Ae Dil Hai Mushkil | 165 | "Ae Dil Hai Mushkil" | Pritam Chakraborty | Amitabh Bhattacharya | | | |
| Ae Dil Hai Mushkil | 166 | "Channa Mereya" | Pritam Chakraborty | Amitabh Bhattacharya | | | |
| Ae Dil Hai Mushkil | 167 | "The Breakup Song" | Pritam Chakraborty | Amitabh Bhattacharya | Badshah, Jonita Gandhi, Nakash Aziz | | |
| Ae Dil Hai Mushkil | 168 | "Alizeh" | Pritam Chakraborty | Amitabh Bhattacharya | Ash King, Shashwat Singh | | |
| Ae Dil Hai Mushkil | 169 | "Bulleya" (Reprise Version) | Pritam Chakraborty | Amitabh Bhattacharya | Shilpa Rao | | |
| Ae Dil Hai Mushkil | 170 | "Channa Mereya" (Unplugged Version) | Pritam Chakraborty | Amitabh Bhattacharya | | | |
| Salaam Mumbai | 171 | "Reza Reza" | Dilshad Shabbir Sheikh | Ritu Shri | Shiba Bhardwaj, Hamidreza Monfared | | |
| Tum Bin 2 | 172 | "Ishq Mubarak" | Ankit Tiwari | Manoj Muntashir | | | |
| Tum Bin 2 | 173 | "Dekh Lena" | Ankit Tiwari | Manoj Muntashir | Tulsi Kumar | | |
| Dear Zindagi | 174 | "Tu Hi Hai" | Amit Trivedi | Kausar Munir | | | |
| Dear Zindagi | 175 | "Taarefon Se" | Amit Trivedi | Kausar Munir | | | |
| Dear Zindagi | 176 | "Ae Zindagi Gale Laga Le" (Take 1) | Amit Trivedi | Gulzar | | | |
| Dongri Ka Raja | 177 | "Piya Tu Piya" | Asad Khan | Raqueeb Alam | Chinmayi Sripada | | |
| Saansein | 178 | "Mera Ishq" | Vivek Kar | Kumaar | Ash King, Swati Sharma | | |
| Kahaani 2: Durga Rani Singh | 179 | "Mehram" | Clinton Cerejo | Amitabh Bhattacharya | | | |
| Befikre | 180 | "Nashe Si Chadh Gayi" | Vishal–Shekhar | Jaideep Sahni | Caralisa Monteiro | | |
| Wajah Tum Ho | 181 | "Dil Ke Paas" | Kalyanji–Anandji (Recreated by Abhijit Vaghani) | Rajendra Prasad | Tulsi Kumar, Neuman Pintoo | | |
| Dangal | 182 | "Naina" | Pritam Chakraborty | Amitabh Bhattacharya | | | |

=== Non-film songs ===
| TV Series/Album | No. | Song | Composer(s) | Writer(s) | Co-Singer(s) | Note |
|---|---|---|---|---|---|---|
| Hyundai Elite i20 | 12 | "Drive Mein Junoon" | Clinton Cerejo | Nirmika Singh | Clinton Cerejo | Advertisement |
| Jay Jay Kedara | 13 | "Jay Jay Kedara" | Kailash Kher | | Amitabh Bachchan, Kailash Kher, Suresh Wadkar, Sonu Nigam, Shankar Mahadevan, Shaan, Shreya Ghoshal, Babul Supriyo, Anup Jalota, Hema Malini, Prasoon Joshi, Sivamani Anandan | Baba Kedarnath Teleseries |
| Ranveer Ching Returns | 14 | "My Name Is Ranveer Ching (Ching's Secret Remix)" | Shankar–Ehsaan–Loy (Remixed by DJ Chetas) | — | — | Advertisement |

== 2017 ==
=== Film songs ===
| Film | No | Song | Composer(s) | Writer(s) | Co-Singer(s) | Ref. | Note |
|---|---|---|---|---|---|---|---|
| OK Jaanu | 183 | "Enna Sona" | A. R. Rahman | Gulzar | | | |
| Raees | 184 | "Zaalima" | JAM8 | Amitabh Bhattacharya | Harshdeep Kaur | | |
| Rangoon | 185 | "Yeh Ishq Hai" | Vishal Bhardwaj | Gulzar | | | |
| Rangoon | 186 | "Alvida" | Vishal Bhardwaj | Gulzar | | | |
| Badrinath Ki Dulhania | 187 | "Roke Na Ruke Naina" | Amaal Mallik | Kumaar | | | |
| Poorna | 188 | "Kuch Parbat Hilaayein" | Salim–Sulaiman | Amitabh Bhattacharya | | | |
| Poorna | 189 | "Baabul Mora" | Salim–Sulaiman | Amitabh Bhattacharya | | | |
| Begum Jaan | 190 | "Woh Subah" | Khayyam (Recreated by Anu Malik) | Sahir Ludhiyanvi | Shreya Ghoshal | | |
| Begum Jaan | 191 | "Murshida" | Anu Malik | Rahat Indori | | | |
| Meri Pyaari Bindu | 192 | "Haareya" | Sachin–Jigar | Priya Saraiya | | | |
| Meri Pyaari Bindu | 193 | "Titli Trippin" | Sachin–Jigar | Vayu | Neeti Mohan | | Song released in July 2020 |
| Half Girlfriend | 194 | "Phir Bhi Tumko Chaahunga" | Mithoon | Manoj Muntashir | Shashaa Tirupati | | |
| Half Girlfriend | 195 | "Pal Bhar" (Chaahunga Reprise) | Mithoon | Manoj Muntashir | | | |
| Raabta | 196 | "Ik Vaari Aa" | Pritam Chakraborty | Amitabh Bhattacharya | | | |
| Raabta | 197 | "Raabta" | Pritam Chakraborty | Amitabh Bhattacharya, Irshad Kamil | Nikhita Gandhi | | |
| Raabta | 198 | "Lambiyaan Si Judaiyaan" | JAM8 | Amitabh Bhattacharya | Shadab Faridi, Altamash Faridi | | |
| Raabta | 199 | "Main Tera Boyfriend" | Meet Bros | Kumaar | Neha Kakkar, Meet Bros, Sourav Roy, Sohrabuddin | | |
| Behen Hogi Teri | 200 | "Tera Hoke Rahoon" | JAM8 | Bipin Das | | | |
| Sweetiee Weds NRI | 201 | "Musafir" (Reprise) | Palash Muchhal | Palak Muchhal | | | |
| Sweetiee Weds NRI | 202 | "Musafir" (Remix) | Palash Muchhal | Palak Muchhal | Atif Aslam | | |
| Dobaara | 203 | "Ab Raat" | Samira Koppikar | Samira Koppikar | Puneet Sharma | | |
| Shab | 204 | "O Saathi" | Mithoon | Mithoon | | | |
| Jagga Jasoos | 205 | "Ullu Ka Pattha" | Pritam Chakraborty | Amitabh Bhattacharya | Nikhita Gandhi | | |
| Jagga Jasoos | 206 | "Galti Se Mistake" | Pritam Chakraborty | Amitabh Bhattacharya | Amit Mishra | | |
| Jagga Jasoos | 207 | "Jhumritalaiyya" | Pritam Chakraborty | Neelesh Misra | Mohan Kanan | | |
| Jagga Jasoos | 208 | "Phir Wahi" | Pritam Chakraborty | Amitabh Bhattacharya | | | |
| Jab Harry Met Sejal | 209 | "Beech Beech Mein" | Pritam Chakraborty | Irshad Kamil | Shalmali Kholgade, Shefali Alvares | | |
| Jab Harry Met Sejal | 210 | "Safar" | Pritam Chakraborty | Irshad Kamil | | | |
| Jab Harry Met Sejal | 211 | "Hawayein" | Pritam Chakraborty | Irshad Kamil | | | |
| Jab Harry Met Sejal | 212 | "Hawayein" (Film version) | Pritam Chakraborty | Irshad Kamil | | | |
| Bareilly Ki Barfi | 213 | "Bairaagi" | Samira Koppikar | Puneet Sharma | Samira Koppikar | | |
| Qaidi Band | 214 | "Hulchul" | Amit Trivedi | Kausar Munir | Yashita Sharma | | |
| Qaidi Band | 215 | "Poshampa" | Amit Trivedi | Kausar Munir | Yashita Sharma | | |
| Qaidi Band | 216 | "Junooni" | Amit Trivedi | Kausar Munir | Yashita Sharma | | |
| Qaidi Band | 217 | "Udanchoo" | Amit Trivedi | Kausar Munir | Yashita Sharma | | |
| Qaidi Band | 218 | "I am India" | Amit Trivedi | Habib Faisal | Yashita Sharma | | |
| Qaidi Band | 219 | "Jag Mag" | Amit Trivedi | Habib Faisal | Yashita Sharma, Peter Muxka Manuel | | |
| A Gentleman | 220 | "Laagi Na Choote" | Sachin–Jigar | Priya Saraiya | Shreya Ghoshal | | |
| Lucknow Central | 221 | "Rangdaari" | Arjunna Harjaie | Kumaar | | | |
| Simran | 222 | "Meet" | Sachin–Jigar | Priya Saraiya | | | |
| Haseena Parkar | 223 | "Tere Bina" | Sachin–Jigar | Priya Saraiya | Priya Saraiya | | |
| Aksar 2 | 224 | "Jaana Ve" | Mithoon | Sayeed Quadri | | | |
| Aksar 2 | 225 | "Aaj Zid" | Mithoon | Sayeed Quadri | | | |
| Ranchi Diaries | 226 | "Thoda Aur" | Jeet Gannguli | Manoj Muntashir | Palak Muchhal | | |
| Rukh | 227 | "Hai Baaki" | Amit Trivedi | Sidhant Mago | | | |
| Tu Hai Mera Sunday | 228 | "Thodi Si Jagah" | Amartya Rahut | Milind Dhaimade | | | |
| Tu Hai Mera Sunday | 229 | "Dhoond Lo" | Amartya Rahut | Milind Dhaimade | | | |
| Shaadi Mein Zaroor Aana | 230 | "Main Hoon Saath Tere" | JAM8 | Shakeel Azmi, Kunaal Verma | | | |
| Monsoon Shootout | 231 | "Pal" | Rochak Kohli | Sumant Vadhera | | | |

=== Non-film songs ===
| TV Series/Album | No. | Song | Composer(s) | Writer(s) | Co-Singer(s) | Note |
|---|---|---|---|---|---|---|
| Kabhi Yaadon Mein | 15 | "Kabhi Yaadon Mein" | Saptarshi (Recreated by Abhijit Vaghani) | Nusrat Badr (Additional by Chhavi Sodhani) | Palak Muchhal | |
| Indiabulls Home Loans Brand Film | 16 | "Sheher Mein Apna Ghar Ho Toh" | Shankar Mahadevan | Javed Akhtar | — | Advertisement |
| Aaj Likhenge Kal | 17 | "Aaj Likhenge Kal" | Vishal Bharadwaj | Srijan Shukla | — | TV series |

== 2018 ==
=== Film songs ===
| Film | No | Song | Composer(s) | Writer(s) | Co-Singer(s) | Ref. | Note |
|---|---|---|---|---|---|---|---|
| 1921 | 232 | "Tere Bina" | Asad Khan | Raqueeb Alam | Aakanksha Sharma | | |
| Jaane Kyun De Yaaron | 233 | "Meri Tanhaiyon Mein" | Satya, Manik, Afsar AMAR | Prashant Ingole | | | |
| Phir Se... | 234 | "Maine Socha Ke Chura Loon" | Jeet Gannguli | Rashmi Virag | Shreya Ghoshal | | |
| Padmaavat | 235 | "Binte Dil" | Sanjay Leela Bhansali | A. M. Turaz | | | |
| Padman | 236 | "Aaj Se Teri" | Amit Trivedi | Kausar Munir | | | |
| Sonu Ke Titu Ki Sweety | 237 | "Subah Subah" | Amaal Mallik | Kumaar | Prakriti Kakar | | |
| Sonu Ke Titu Ki Sweety | 238 | "Tera Yaar Hoon Main" | Rochak Kohli | Kumaar | | | |
| 3 Storeys | 239 | "Bas Tu Hai" | Clinton Cerejo | Puneet Krishna | Jonita Gandhi | | |
| Dil Juunglee | 240 | "Bandeya" | Shaarib-Toshi | Dr. Devendra Kafir | | | |
| Hichki | 241 | "Khol De Par" | Jasleen Royal | Raj Shekhar | | | |
| 102 Not Out | 242 | "Bachche Ki Jaan" | Salim–Sulaiman | Hiral Brahmbhatt | | | |
| Raazi | 243 | "Ae Watan" | Shankar–Ehsaan–Loy | Gulzar | | | |
| Raazi | 244 | "Raazi" | Shankar–Ehsaan–Loy | Gulzar | | | |
| Parmanu | 245 | "Sapna" | Sachin–Jigar | Sachin Sanghvi | | | |
| Veere Di Wedding | 246 | "Aa Jao Na" | Shashwat Sachdev | Raj Shekhar | | | |
| When Obama Loved Osama | 247 | "Dil Jugaadu" | Kashi-Richard | Shweta Raaj | Akanksha Sharma | | |
| Saheb, Biwi Aur Gangster 3 | 248 | "Andheron Mein Rishtey" | Rana Mazumder | Sandeep Nath | | | |
| Karwaan | 249 | "Chota Sa Fasana" | Anurag Saikia | Akash Khurana | | | |
| Genius | 250 | "Tera Fitoor" | Himesh Reshammiya | Kumaar | | | |
| Laila Majnu | 251 | "Aahista" | Niladri Kumar | Irshad Kamil | Jonita Gandhi | | |
| Batti Gul Meter Chalu | 252 | "Har Har Gange" | Sachet – Parampara | Siddharth – Garima | | | |
| Pataakha | 253 | "Naina Banjare" | Vishal Bhardwaj | Gulzar | | | |
| Andhadhun | 254 | "Woh Ladki" | Amit Trivedi | Jaideep Sahni | | | |
| Helicopter Eela | 255 | "Dooba Dooba" | Amit Trivedi | Swanand Kirkire | Sunidhi Chauhan | | |
| Jalebi | 256 | "Pal" | Javed-Mohsin | Prashant Ingole, Kunaal Vermaa | Shreya Ghoshal | | |
| Jalebi | 257 | "Mera Pyar Tera Pyar" | Jeet Gannguli | Rashmi Virag | | | |
| Baazaar | 258 | "Chhod Diya" | Kanika Kapoor | Shabbir Ahmed | | | |
| Rajma Chawal | 259 | "Yaariyan" | Hitesh Sonik | Irshad Kamil | | | |
| Kedarnath | 260 | "Qaafirana" | Amit Trivedi | Amitabh Bhattacharya | Nikhita Gandhi | | |
| Kedarnath | 261 | "Jaan Nisaar" | Amit Trivedi | Amitabh Bhattacharya | | | |
| Simmba | 262 | "Bandeya Rey Bandeya" | Tanishk Bagchi | Rashmi Virag | Asees Kaur | | |

=== Non-film songs ===
| TV Series/Album | No. | Song | Composer(s) | Writer(s) | Co-Singer(s) | Note |
|---|---|---|---|---|---|---|
| Le Jaa Tu Kahin | 18 | "Le Jaa Tu Kahin" | Sufiyan Bhatt | Sahil Fatehpuri | — | |

== 2019 ==
=== Film songs ===
| Film | No | Song | Composer(s) | Writer(s) | Co-Singer(s) | Ref. | Note |
|---|---|---|---|---|---|---|---|
| Sonchiriya | 263 | "Ruan Ruan" | Vishal Bhardwaj | Varun Grover | | | |
| Mere Pyare Prime Minister | 264 | "Mere Pyare Prime Minister – Title Track" | Shankar–Ehsaan–Loy | Gulzar | | | |
| Kesari | 265 | "Ve Maahi" | Tanishk Bagchi | Tanishk Bagchi | Asees Kaur | | |
| Kalank | 266 | "First Class" | Pritam Chakraborty | Amitabh Bhattacharya | Neeti Mohan | | |
| Kalank | 267 | "Kalank – Title Track" | Pritam Chakraborty | Amitabh Bhattacharya | | | |
| Kalank | 268 | "Kalank – Title Track" (Duet Version) | Pritam Chakraborty | Amitabh Bhattacharya | Shilpa Rao | | |
| Kalank | 269 | "Kalank – Title Track" (Bonus Track) | Pritam Chakraborty | Amitabh Bhattacharya | Shilpa Rao | | |
| Student of the Year 2 | 270 | "Main Bhi Nahin Soya" | Vishal–Shekhar | Anvita Dutt | | | |
| De De Pyaar De | 271 | "Tu Mila To Haina" | Amaal Mallik | Kunaal Vermaa | | | |
| De De Pyaar De | 272 | "Dil Royi Jaye" | Rochak Kohli | Kumaar | | | |
| Kabir Singh | 273 | "Bekhayali" (Version 2) | Sachet–Parampara | Irshad Kamil | | | |
| Kabir Singh | 274 | "Tujhe Kitna Chahne Lage" | Mithoon | Mithoon | | | |
| Jabariya Jodi | 275 | "Ki Honda Pyaar" | Vishal Mishra | Raj Shekhar | | | |
| Chhichhore | 276 | "Woh Din" | Pritam Chakraborty | Amitabh Bhattacharya | | | |
| Chhichhore | 277 | "Khairiyat" | Pritam Chakraborty | Amitabh Bhattacharya | | | |
| Chhichhore | 278 | "Khairiyat" (Bonus Track) | Pritam Chakraborty | Amitabh Bhattacharya | | | |
| The Zoya Factor | 279 | "Kaash" | Shankar–Ehsaan–Loy | Amitabh Bhattacharya | Alyssa Mendonsa | | |
| The Zoya Factor | 280 | "Kaash" (Unplugged) | Shankar–Ehsaan–Loy | Amitabh Bhattacharya | | | |
| Pal Pal Dil Ke Paas | 281 | "Pal Pal Dil Ke Paas – Title Track" | Sachet–Parampara | Siddharth-Garima | Parampara Thakur | | |
| War | 282 | "Ghungroo" | Vishal–Shekhar | Kumaar | Shilpa Rao | | |
| The Sky Is Pink | 283 | "Dil Hi Toh Hai" | Pritam Chakraborty | Gulzar | Antara Mitra | | |
| The Sky Is Pink | 284 | "Zindagi" | Pritam Chakraborty | Gulzar | | | |
| Made in China | 285 | "Valam" | Sachin–Jigar | Priya Saraiya | Priya Saraiya, Sachin–Jigar | | |
| Satellite Shankar | 286 | "Tere Sang" | Mithoon | Mithoon | Aakanshka Sharma | | |
| Marjaavaan | 287 | "Thodi Jagah" | Tanishk Bagchi | Rashmi Virag | | | |
| Commando 3 | 288 | "Akhiyaan Milavanga" | Mannan Shaah | Sahil Sultanpuri | Sruthy Sasidharan | | |
| Pati, Patni Aur Woh | 289 | "Tu Hi Yaar Mera" | Rochak Kohli | Kumaar | Neha Kakkar | | |
| The Body | 290 | "Khuda Hafiz" | Arko | Manoj Muntashir | | | |
| Good Newwz | 291 | "Dil Na Jaaneya" (Unplugged) | Rochak Kohli | Gurpreet Saini | | | |

=== Non-film songs ===
| TV Series/Album | No. | Song | Composer(s) | Writer(s) | Co-Singer(s) | Note |
|---|---|---|---|---|---|---|
| Jaani Ve | 19 | "Pachtaoge" | B Praak | Jaani | — | |
| Intezaar | 20 | "Intezaar" | Mithoon | | Asees Kaur | |
| Raanjhana | 21 | "Raanjhana" | Asad Khan | Raqeeb Alam | — | |

== 2020 ==
=== Film songs ===
| Film | No | Song | Composer(s) | Writer(s) | Co-Singer(s) | Ref. | Note |
|---|---|---|---|---|---|---|---|
| Chhapaak | 292 | "Chhapaak" (Title Track) | Shankar–Ehsaan–Loy | Gulzar | | | |
| Chhapaak | 293 | "Khulne Do" | Shankar–Ehsaan–Loy | Gulzar | | | |
| Chhapaak | 294 | "Sab Jhulas Gaya" | Shankar–Ehsaan–Loy | Gulzar | | | |
| Jai Mummy Di | 295 | "Dariyaganj" | Amartya Bobo Rahut | Siddharth Kaushal | Dhvani Bhanushali | | |
| Street Dancer 3D | 296 | "Dua Karo" | Sachin–Jigar | Priya Saraiya | Bohemia | | |
| Happy Hardy and Heer | 297 | "Heeriye" | Himesh Reshammiya | Shabbir Ahmed | Shreya Ghoshal | | Song released in July 2019 |
| Malang | 298 | "Chal Ghar Chalen" | Mithoon | Sayeed Quadri | | | |
| Malang | 299 | "Chal Ghar Chalen (Remix)" | Mithoon (Remixed by DJ Shadow Dubai) | Sayeed Quadri | | | |
| Love Aaj Kal | 300 | "Shayad" | Pritam Chakraborty | Irshad Kamil | | | |
| Love Aaj Kal | 301 | "Haan Main Galat" | Pritam Chakraborty | Irshad Kamil | Shashwat Singh | | |
| Love Aaj Kal | 302 | "Rahogi Meri" | Pritam Chakraborty | Irshad Kamil | | | |
| Love Aaj Kal | 303 | "Haan Tum Ho" | Pritam Chakraborty | Irshad Kamil | Shilpa Rao | | |
| Love Aaj Kal | 304 | "Shayad" (Reprise) | Pritam Chakraborty | Irshad Kamil | Madhubanti Bagchi | | |
| Love Aaj Kal | 305 | "Shayad" (Aaj Kal) | Pritam Chakraborty | Irshad Kamil | Pritam | | |
| Scotland | 306 | "Mere Parwardigaar" | Harpreet Singh | Rajiv Rana | | | |
| Shubh Mangal Zyada Saavdhan | 307 | "Raakh" | Tanishk-Vayu | Vayu | | | |
| Babloo Bachelor | 308 | "Kasam" | Jeet Gannguli | Rashmi Virag | | | |
| Babloo Bachelor | 309 | "Tum Ho" | Indraadip Dasgupta | Ashish Pandit | | | |
| Dil Bechara | 310 | "Khulke Jeene Ka" | A. R. Rahman | Amitabh Bhattacharya | Shashaa Tirupati | | Disney Plus Hotstar film |
| Gunjan Saxena | 311 | "Bharat Ki Beti" | Amit Trivedi | Kausar Munir | | | Netflix film |
| Sadak 2 | 312 | "Shukriya" (Rendition) | Jeet Gannguli | Rashmi Virag | KK, Jubin Nautiyal | | Disney Plus Hotstar film |
| Ludo | 313 | "Aabaad Barbaad" | Pritam | Sandeep Shrivastva | | | Netflix film |
| Ludo | 314 | "Hardum Humdum" | Pritam | Sayeed Quadri | | | Netflix film |
| Ludo | 315 | "Hardum Humdum" (Film Version) | Pritam | Sayeed Quadri | | | Netflix film |
| Darbaan | 316 | "Khushmizaaj" | Amartya Bobo Rahut | Manoj Yadav | Amartya Bobo Rahut | | Zee5 film |
| Sayonee | 317 | "Sayonee" | Junoon (Recreated by Joy-Anjan) | Junoon (Additional lyrics by Alaukik Rahi) | Jyoti Nooran | | |

=== Non-film songs ===
| TV Series/Album | No. | Song | Composer(s) | Writer(s) | Co-Singer(s) | Note |
|---|---|---|---|---|---|---|
| The Forgotten Army - Azaadi Ke Liye | 25 | "Azaadi Ke Liye (Title Track)" | Pritam | Kausar Munir, Shloke Lal | Tushar Joshi | Web series |
| The Forgotten Army - Azaadi Ke Liye | 26 | "Mere Watan" | Pritam | Kausar Munir | — | Web series |
| The Forgotten Army - Azaadi Ke Liye | 27 | "Mere Watan (Sad)" | Pritam | Kausar Munir | — | Web series |
| Afsos | 28 | "Afsos – Title Track" | Neel Adhikari | Neel Adhikari, Sameer Satija | — | — |
| Dil Ko Maine Di Kasam | 29 | "Dil Ko Maine Di Kasam" | Amaal Mallik | Kumaar | — | — |
| Rihaa | 30 | "Rihaa" | Arijit Singh | Shloke Lal | — | — |
| Bhoomi | 31 | "Zinda Dili" | Salim–Sulaiman | Niranjan Iyengar | — | — |

== 2021 ==
=== Film songs ===
| Film | No | Song | Composer(s) | Writer(s) | Co-Singer(s) | Ref. | Note |
|---|---|---|---|---|---|---|---|
| The Power | 318 | "Oh Saaiyaan" | Salim–Sulaiman | Kumaar | Raj Pandit | | Zee5 film |
| Pagglait | 319 | "Phire Faqeera" | Arijit Singh | Neelesh Misra | Raja Kumari, Amrita Singh | | Netflix film |
| Pagglait | 320 | "Pagglait" | Arijit Singh | Raftaar | Raftaar, Amrita Singh | | Netflix film |
| Pagglait | 321 | "Dil Udd Ja Re" (Revisited) | Arijit Singh | Neelesh Misra | Meghna Mishra | | Netflix film |
| Pagglait | 322 | "Thode Kam Ajnabi" (Reprise Version) | Arijit Singh | Neelesh Misra | Himani Kapoor | | Netflix film |
| Pagglait | 323 | "Lamha" (Revisited) | Arijit Singh | Neelesh Misra | Antara Mitra | | Netflix film |
| Pagglait | 324 | "Pagal" | Arijit Singh | Neelesh Misra | Raja Kumari, Amrita Singh | | Netflix film |
| 99 Songs | 325 | "Jwalamukhi" | A. R. Rahman | Navneet Virk | | | |
| Toofaan | 326 | "Jo Tum Aa Gaye Ho" | Samuel-Akanksha | Javed Akhtar, Manoj Kumar Nath | | | Amazon Prime Video film |
| Toofaan | 327 | "Ananya" | Shankar–Ehsaan–Loy | Javed Akhtar | | | Amazon Prime Video film |
| Bhuj: The Pride of India | 328 | "Desh Mere" | Arko Pravo Mukherjee | Manoj Muntashir | | | Disney Plus Hotstar film |
| Sooryavanshi | 329 | "Mere Yaaraa" | JAM8 | Rashmi Virag | Neeti Mohan | | |
| Bunty Aur Babli 2 | 330 | "Luv Ju" | Shankar–Ehsaan–Loy | Amitabh Bhattacharya | | | |
| Cash | 331 | "Tera Hua" | Akull | Kunaal Vermaa | | | Disney Plus Hotstar film |
| Tadap | 332 | "Tumse Bhi Zyada" | Pritam | Irshad Kamil | | | |
| Atrangi Re | 333 | "Rait Zara Si" | A. R. Rahman | Irshad Kamil | Shashaa Tirupati | | Disney Plus Hotstar film |
| Atrangi Re | 334 | "Tumhein Mohabbat" | A. R. Rahman | Irshad Kamil | | | Disney Plus Hotstar film |
| 83 | 335 | "Lehra Do" | Pritam | Kausar Munir | | | |
| 83 | 336 | "Lehra Do" (Film Version) | Pritam | Kausar Munir | | | |
| 83 | 337 | "Lehra Do" (Extended) | Pritam | Kausar Munir | | | |
| 83 | 338 | "Jeetega Jeetega" (Film Version) | Pritam | Kausar Munir | | | |
| 83 | 339 | "Jeetega Jeetega" (Bonus Track) | Pritam | Kausar Munir | | | |

=== Non-film songs ===
| TV Series/Album | No. | Song | Composer(s) | Writer(s) | Co-Singer(s) | Note |
|---|---|---|---|---|---|---|
| Jaanein Bachayenge | 32 | "Jaanein Bachayenge" | Arijit Singh | Neelesh Misra | — | — |
| Zindagi Ko Hi5 | 33 | "Zindagi Ko Hi5" | Sunny M.R. | Amitabh Bhattacharya | — | — |

== 2022 ==
=== Film songs ===
| Film | No | Song | Composer(s) | Writer(s) | Co-Singer(s) | Ref. | Note |
|---|---|---|---|---|---|---|---|
| Badhaai Do | 340 | "Atak Gaya" | Amit Trivedi | Varun Grover | Rupali Moghe | | |
| Gangubai Kathiawadi | 341 | "Muskurahat" | Sanjay Leela Bhansali | A. M. Turaz | | | |
| Radhe Shyam | 342 | "Aashiqui Aa Gayi" | Mithoon | Mithoon | | | |
| Radhe Shyam | 343 | "Soch Liya" | Mithoon | Manoj Muntashir | | | |
| Bachchan Pandey | 344 | "Heer Ranjhana" | Amaal Malik | Kumaar | Shreya Ghoshal | | |
| Runway 34 | 345 | "Mitra Re" | Jasleen Royal | Aditya Sharma | Jasleen Royal | | |
| Runway 34 | 346 | "Mitra Re" (Reprise) | Jasleen Royal | Aditya Sharma | Jasleen Royal | | |
| Runway 34 | 347 | "Mitra Re" (Arijit Solo) | Jasleen Royal | Aditya Sharma | | | |
| Chitrakut | 348 | "Maan Le" | Somesh Saha | Somesh Saha, Divya Unny | | | |
| Chitrakut | 349 | "Maan Le" (Reprise) | Somesh Saha | Somesh Saha, Divya Unny | | | |
| Chitrakut | 350 | "Maan Le" (Remix) | Somesh Saha | Somesh Saha, Divya Unny | | | |
| Bhool Bhulaiyaa 2 | 351 | "Hum Nashe Mein Toh Nahin" | Pritam | Amitabh Bhattacharya | Tulsi Kumar | | |
| Bhool Bhulaiyaa 2 | 352 | "Mere Dholna" (Arijit Version) | Pritam | Sameer | | | |
| Bhool Bhulaiyaa 2 | 353 | "Ami Je Tomar" (Tandav Version) | Pritam | Sameer | | | |
| Bhool Bhulaiyaa 2 | 354 | "Ami Je Tomar" (Kiara's Scare) | Pritam | Sameer | Shreya Ghoshal | | |
| Bhool Bhulaiyaa 2 | 355 | "Ami Je Tomar" (Vidya X Kartik) | Pritam | Sameer | Shreya Ghoshal | | |
| Samrat Prithviraj | 356 | "Makhmali" | Shankar Ehsaan Loy | Varun Grover | Shreya Ghoshal, Keerthi Sagathia | | |
| Ittu Si Baat | 357 | "Sun Bhi Le" | Vishal Mishra | Raj Shekhar | Vishal Mishra | | |
| Rashtra Kavach Om | 358 | "Seher" | Arko Pravo Mukherjee | A. M. Turaz | | | |
| HIT: The First Case | 359 | "Kitni Haseen Hogi" | Mithoon | Sayeed Quadri | | | |
| Shamshera | 360 | "Fitoor" | Mithoon | Karan Malhotra | Neeti Mohan | | |
| Darlings | 361 | "La Ilaaj" | Vishal Bhardwaj | Gulzar | | | Netflix film |
| Raksha Bandhan | 362 | "Dhaagon Se Baandhaa" | Himesh Reshammiya | Irshad Kamil | Shreya Ghoshal | | |
| Laal Singh Chaddha | 363 | "Phir Na Aisi Raat Aayegi" | Pritam | Amitabh Bhattacharya | | | |
| Laal Singh Chaddha | 364 | "Tur Kalleyan" | Pritam | Amitabh Bhattacharya | Shadab Faridi, Altamash Faridi | | |
| Laal Singh Chaddha | 365 | "Tere Hawaale" | Pritam | Amitabh Bhattacharya | Shilpa Rao | | |
| Laal Singh Chaddha | 366 | "Phir Na Aisi Raat Aayegi" (Reprise) | Pritam | Amitabh Bhattacharya | | | Released as part of the Extended Album in April 2023 |
| Laal Singh Chaddha | 367 | "Tere Hawaale" (Arijit - Shreya Duet) | Pritam | Amitabh Bhattacharya | Shreya Ghoshal | | Released as part of the Extended Album in April 2023 |
| Brahmāstra Part One: Shiva | 368 | "Kesariya" | Pritam | Amitabh Bhattacharya | | | |
| Brahmāstra Part One: Shiva | 369 | "Deva Deva" | Pritam | Amitabh Bhattacharya | Jonita Gandhi | | |
| Brahmāstra Part One: Shiva | 370 | "Dance Ka Bhoot" | Pritam | Amitabh Bhattacharya | | | |
| Brahmāstra Part One: Shiva | 371 | "Deva Deva" (Film Version) | Pritam | Amitabh Bhattacharya | Jonita Gandhi | | |
| Brahmāstra Part One: Shiva | 372 | "Rasiya Reprise" | Pritam | Amitabh Bhattacharya | | | |
| Brahmāstra Part One: Shiva | 373 | "Kesariya" (Dance Mix) | Pritam | Amitabh Bhattacharya | Shashwat Singh, Antara Mitra | | |
| Brahmāstra Part One: Shiva | 374 | "Kesariya" (Film Version) | Pritam | Amitabh Bhattacharya | Antara Mitra | | |
| Atithi Bhooto Bhava | 375 | "Paakhi Hua Re" | Prasad S | Priyanka R Bala | | | Zee5 film |
| Dhokha: Round D Corner | 376 | "Mahi Mera Dil" | Tanishk Bagchi | Kumaar | Tulsi Kumar | | |
| Maja Ma | 377 | "Kacchi Doriyaan" | Anurag Sharma | Anurag Sharma | Asees Kaur | | Amazon Prime Video film |
| Code Name: Tiranga | 378 | "Yaar Ve" | Vipin Patwa | Kumaar | | | |
| Thank God | 379 | "Thank God - Title Track" | Rochak Kohli | Manoj Muntashir | Eklavya | | |
| Bhediya | 380 | "Apna Bana Le" | Sachin–Jigar | Amitabh Bhattacharya | Sachin-Jigar | | |
| Freddy | 381 | "Kaala Jaadu" | Pritam | Irshad Kamil | Nikhita Gandhi | | Disney Plus Hotstar film |
| Salaam Venky | 382 | "Jo Tum Saath Ho" | Mithoon | Mithoon | | | |
| Salaam Venky | 383 | "Jo Tum Saath Ho" (Duet) | Mithoon | Mithoon | Shreya Ghoshal | | |

=== Non-film songs ===
| TV Series/Album | No. | Song | Composer(s) | Writer(s) | Co-Singer(s) | Note |
|---|---|---|---|---|---|---|
| Dhokha | 34 | "Dhokha" | Manan Bhardwaj | | — | — |
| Deh Shivaa | 35 | "Deh Shiva" | Arijit Singh | Shloke Lal | M.C Mawali (Rap), Kiraat Singh (Child voice) | — |
| Yaadein Wohi | 36 | "Yaadein Wohi" | Arijit Singh | | — | — |
| Gaaye Ja | 37 | "Gaaye Ja" | Sunny M.R. | Shloke Lal | — | — |
| Dr. Arora | 38 | "Mehram" | Niladri Kumar | Irshad Kamil | — | Web series |
| Patriot | 39 | "Patriot" | Arijit Singh | | — | — |

== 2023 ==
=== Film songs ===
| Film | No | Song | Composer(s) | Writer(s) | Co-Singer(s) | Ref. | Note |
|---|---|---|---|---|---|---|---|
| Pathaan | 384 | "Jhoome Jo Pathaan" | Vishal–Shekhar | Kumaar | Sukriti Kakar, Vishal–Shekhar | | |
| Shehzada | 385 | "Chedkhaniyan" | Pritam | Shloke Lal, IP Singh | Nikhita Gandhi | | |
| Tu Jhoothi Main Makkaar | 386 | "Tere Pyaar Mein" | Pritam | Amitabh Bhattacharya | Nikhita Gandhi | | |
| Tu Jhoothi Main Makkaar | 387 | "Pyaar Hota Kayi Baar Hain" | Pritam | Amitabh Bhattacharya | Charan (Rap) | | |
| Tu Jhoothi Main Makkaar | 388 | "O Bedardeya" | Pritam | Amitabh Bhattacharya | | | |
| Bad Boy | 389 | "Tera Hua" | Himesh Reshammiya | Sonia Kapoor Reshammiya | Jyotica Tangri | | |
| Ponniyin Selvan: II | 390 | "Mera Aasmaan Jal Gaya" | A. R. Rahman | Gulzar | | | |
| Ponniyin Selvan: II | 391 | "PS Anthem" | A. R. Rahman | Gulzar | Benny Dayal, Nabyla Maan | | |
| Zara Hatke Zara Bachke | 392 | "Phir Aur Kya Chahiye" | Sachin-Jigar | Amitabh Bhattacharya | | | |
| Adipurush | 393 | "Jai Shri Ram" (Arijit Singh Version) | Ajay-Atul | Manoj Muntashir | | | |
| Satyaprem Ki Katha | 394 | "Pasoori Nu" | Ali Sethi, Zulfiqar Jabbar Khan (recreated by Rochak Kohli) | Ali Sethi, Fazal Abbas (additional lyrics by Gurpreet Saini) | Tulsi Kumar | | |
| Satyaprem Ki Katha | 395 | "Le Aaunga" | Tanishk Bagchi | Tanishk Bagchi | | | |
| Bawaal | 396 | "Tumhe Kitna Pyaar Karte" | Mithoon | Manoj Muntashir | Mithoon | | Amazon Prime Video film |
| Rocky Aur Rani Kii Prem Kahaani | 397 | "Tum Kya Mile" | Pritam | Amitabh Bhattacharya | Shreya Ghoshal | | |
| Rocky Aur Rani Kii Prem Kahaani | 398 | "Tum Kya Mile" (Radio Edit) | Pritam | Amitabh Bhattacharya | Shreya Ghoshal | | |
| Rocky Aur Rani Kii Prem Kahaani | 399 | "What Jhumka?" | Pritam | Amitabh Bhattacharya | Jonita Gandhi, Ranveer Singh (Rap) | | |
| Rocky Aur Rani Kii Prem Kahaani | 400 | "Ve Kamleya" | Pritam | Amitabh Bhattacharya | Shreya Ghoshal, Altamash Faridi, Shadab Faridi | | |
| Gadar 2 | 401 | "Khairiyat" | Mithoon | Sayeed Quadri | | | |
| Gadar 2 | 402 | "Dil Jhoom" | Mithoon | Sayeed Quadri | | | |
| Jawan | 403 | "Chaleya" | Anirudh Ravichander | Kumaar | Shilpa Rao | | |
| Jawan | 404 | “Faraatta” | Anirudh Ravichander | Kumaar | Jonita Gandhi, Badshah | | |
| Jaane Jaan | 405 | "Doriyaan" | Sachin-Jigar | Priya Saraiya | | | Netflix film |
| Khufiya | 406 | "Dil Dushman" | Vishal Bhardwaj | Gulzar | | | Netflix film |
| Khufiya | 407 | "Na Hosh Chale" (Arijit's Version) | Vishal Bhardwaj | Gulzar | | | Netflix film |
| Yaariyan 2 | 408 | "Oonchi Oonchi Deewarein" | Manan Bhardwaj | Manan Bhardwaj | | | |
| Yaariyan 2 | 409 | "Blue Hain Paani Paani" | Khaalif, Yo Yo Honey Singh | Khaalif, Yo Yo Honey Singh | Neha Kakkar | | |
| Pyaar Hai Toh Hai | 410 | "Mann Jogiya" | Anique | Dheeraj Kumar | Ishita Vishwakarma | | |
| Tejas | 411 | "Jaan Da" (Saiyaan Ve) | Shashwat Sachdev | Kumaar | | | |
| Brand Bollywood Downunder | 412 | "Aaja Baija Tu" | Salim-Sulaiman | Shraddha Pandit | EPR Iyer | | Australian Documentary Film released on 2 November 2023 in Australia |
| Pippa | 413 | "Main Parwaana" | A. R. Rahman | Shellee | | | Amazon Prime Video film |
| Tiger 3 | 414 | "Leke Prabhu Ka Naam" | Pritam | Amitabh Bhattacharya | Nikhita Gandhi | | |
| Tiger 3 | 415 | "Ruaan" | Pritam | Irshad Kamil | | | |
| Starfish | 416 | "Fanaa Kar Lo" | OAFF, Savera | Ankur Tewari | | | |
| Animal | 417 | "Satranga" | Shreyas Puranik | Siddharth–Garima | | | |
| The Archies | 418 | "In Raahon Mein" | Shankar-Ehsaan-Loy | Javed Akhtar | | | Netflix film |
| Dunki | 419 | "Lutt Putt Gaya" | Pritam Chakraborty | Swanand Kirkire, IP Singh | | | |
| Dunki | 420 | "O Maahi" | Pritam Chakraborty | Irshad Kamil | | | |

=== Non-film songs ===
| TV Series/Album | No. | Song | Composer(s) | Writer(s) | Co-Singer(s) | Note |
|---|---|---|---|---|---|---|
| Gham Khushiyan | 40 | "Gham Khushiyan" | Rohanpreet Singh | Rana Sotal | Neha Kakkar | — |
| Bairiya | 41 | "Bairiya" | Goldie Sohel | Amitabh Bhattacharya | — | — |
| Jai Shree Mahakaal | 42 | "Jai Shree Mahakaal" | Kailash Kher | | Shankar Mahadevan, Sonu Nigam, Shaan, Kailash Kher | — |
| Bhoomi | 43 | "Zinda Dili 2.0" | Salim–Sulaiman | Niranjan Iyengar | — | — |
| Asi Desi | 44 | "Galtiyaan" | Saurabh Kalsi | Sapan Saran | — | Web series (KingzPlayOfficial YouTube Channel) |
| Heeriye | 45 | "Heeriye" | Jasleen Royal | Aditya Sharma | Jasleen Royal | — |
| Bhide | 46 | "Bhide" | Arijit Singh | Amitabh Bhattacharya, Divine | Divine | 2023 Durand Cup official theme song |
| Kasam Se | 47 | "Kasam Se" | Shekhar Ravjiani | Priya Saraiya | — | — |
| Rooh Jaga Doon | 48 | "Rooh Jaga Doon" | Arijit Singh | Shloke Lal | — | — |
| Bhool Jaa | 49 | "Bhool Jaa" | Piyush Shankar | Rashmi Virag | — | — |
| Nava Durga Gayatri Mantra Jaap | 50 | "Gayatri Mantra" | Arijit Singh | Traditional | — | — |
| Dil Haareya | 51 | "Dil Haareya" | Vivian Richard | Juno | — | — |

== 2024 ==
=== Film songs ===
| Film | No | Song | Composer(s) | Writer(s) | Co-Singer(s) | Ref. | Note |
|---|---|---|---|---|---|---|---|
| Merry Christmas | 421 | "Raat Akeli Thi" | Pritam Chakraborty | Varun Grover | Antara Mitra | | |
| Fighter | 422 | "Dil Banaane Waaleya" | Vishal-Shekhar | Kumaar | Jonita Gandhi | | |
| Zindagi Kashmakash | 423 | "Halka Halka Sa" | Manish Sahriya | Manish Thapliyal | | | |
| Laapataa Ladies | 424 | "Sajni" | Ram Sampath | Prashant Pandey | | | |
| Yodha | 425 | "Tere Sang Ishq Hua" | Tanishk Bagchi | Kunaal Verma | Neeti Mohan | | |
| Dukaan | 426 | "Moh Na Lagey" | Shreyas Puranik | Siddharth–Garima | | | |
| Bade Miyan Chote Miyan | 427 | "Mast Malang Jhoom" | Vishal Mishra | Irshad Kamil | Nikhita Gandhi, Vishal Mishra | | |
| Amar Singh Chamkila | 428 | "Vida Karo" | A. R. Rahman | Irshad Kamil | Jonita Gandhi | | Netflix film |
| Srikanth | 429 | "Jeena Sikha De" | Ved Sharma | Kunaal Vermaa | | | |
| Munjya | 430 | "Tainu Khabar Nahi" | Sachin-Jigar | Amitabh Bhattacharya | | | |
| Chandu Champion | 431 | "Satyanaas" | Pritam Chakraborty | Amitabh Bhattacharya | Nakash Aziz, Dev Negi | | |
| Chandu Champion | 432 | "Tu Hai Champion" | Pritam Chakraborty | IP Singh | Amit Mishra | | |
| Vedaa | 433 | "Zaroorat Se Zyada" | Amaal Mallik | Kunaal Vermaa | Amaal Mallik | | |
| Vedaa | 434 | "Zaroorat Se Zyada (Duet)" | Amaal Mallik | Kunaal Vermaa | Shreya Ghoshal | | |
| Amar Prem Ki Prem Kahani | 435 | "Kasturi" | Prasad S | Kunaal Vermaa | | | |
| Jigra | 436 | "Tenu Sang Rakhna" | Achint Thakkar | Varun Grover | Anumita Nadesan, Achint Thakkar | | |
| Baby John | 437 | "Hazaar Baar" | Thaman S | Irshad Kamil | Shreya Ghoshal | | |

=== Non-film songs ===
| TV Series/Album | No. | Song | Composer(s) | Writer(s) | Co-Singer(s) | Note |
|---|---|---|---|---|---|---|
| Chhodunga Na | 52 | "Chhodunga Na" | Arijit Singh | Kaushal Kishore | — | — |
| Ek Tha Raja | 53 | "Soulmate" | Badshah | — | — | — |
| Gyaarah Gyaarah | 54 | "Jee Loon Main Tujhko" | Rahi Sayed & Tallz | Ginny Diwan | — | Web series on ZEE5 |
| Underrated | 55 | "Tum Kya Ho" | Ankit Tiwari | Abhendra Upadhyay | Ankit Tiwari | — |

== 2025 ==
=== Film songs ===
| Film | No | Song | Composer(s) | Writer(s) | Co-Singer(s) | Ref. | Note |
|---|---|---|---|---|---|---|---|
| Fateh | 438 | "Fateh Kar Fateh" | Haroon-Gavin | Mandeep Khurana | | | |
| Azaad | 439 | "Azaad Hai Tu" | Amit Trivedi | Swanand Kirkire & Amitabh Bhattacharya | Amit Trivedi | | |
| Azaad | 440 | "Ajeeb O Gareeb" | Amit Trivedi | Amitabh Bhattacharya | Hansika Pareek | | |
| Sky Force | 441 | "Tu Hai Toh Main Hoon" | Tanishk Bagchi | Irshad Kamil | Afsana Khan | | |
| Dhoom Dhaam | 442 | "Silsila" | Clinton Cerejo and Bionca Gomes (Shor Police) | Siddhant Kaushal | Jonita Gandhi | | |
| Chhaava | 443 | "Jaane Tu" | A. R. Rahman | Irshad Kamil | | | |
| Sikandar | 444 | "Hum Aapke Bina" | Pritam | Sameer | | | |
| Sitaare Zameen Par | 445 | "Sar Aankhon Pe Mere" | Shankar-Ehsaan-Loy | Amitabh Bhattacharya | Shariva Parulkar | | |
| Metro... In Dino | 446 | "Zamaana Lage" | Pritam | Qaisar Ul Jafri, Sandeep Shrivastava | Shashwat Singh | | |
| Metro... In Dino | 447 | "Aur Mohabbat Kitni Karoon" | Pritam | Sandeep Shrivastava | | | |
| Metro... In Dino | 448 | "Mausam" | Pritam | Qaisar Ul Jafri, Sandeep Shrivastava | | | |
| Metro... In Dino | 449 | "Qayde Se" | Pritam | Amitabh Bhattacharya | | | |
| Saiyaara | 450 | "Dhun" | Mithoon | Mithoon | | | |
| Dhadak 2 | 451 | "Duniya Alag" | Shreyas Puranik | Siddharth–Garima | | | |
| War 2 | 452 | "Aavan Jaavan" | Pritam | Amitabh Bhattacharya | Nikhita Gandhi | | |
| Aabeer Gulaal | 453 | "Khudaya Ishq" | Amit Trivedi | Kumaar | Shilpa Rao | | |
| Aabeer Gulaal | 454 | "Doriyaan" | Amit Trivedi | Kumaar | Shreya Ghoshal | | |
| Nishaanchi | 455 | "Birwa" | Anurag Saikia | Dr Sagar | | | |
| Sunny Sanskari Ki Tulsi Kumari | 456 | "Tumse Behtar" | Tanishk Bagchi | Manoj Muntashir | | | |
| Ek Deewane Ki Deewaniyat | 457 | "Mera Hua" (Arijit Singh) | Annkur R Pathakk | Sachin Urmtosh | | | |
| Gustaakh Ishq | 458 | "Aap Is Dhoop Mein" | Vishal Bharadwaj | Gulzar | | | |
| Tere Ishk Mein | 459 | "Tere Ishk Mein" | A. R. Rahman | Irshad Kamil | | | |
| Dhurandhar | 460 | "Gehra Hua" | Shashwat Sachdev | Irshad Kamil | Armaan Khan | | |

=== Non-film songs ===
| TV Series/Album | No. | Song | Composer(s) | Writer(s) | Co-Singer(s) | Note |
|---|---|---|---|---|---|---|
| Angels for Each Other | 56 | "Angels for Each Other" | Martin Garrix | Arijit Singh, Juno, Martin Garrix, Michel Zitron, Bono, Shaun Farrugia, Simon Carmody | Martin Garrix | — |
| Weightless | 57 | "Weightless" | Martin Garrix | Arjiit Singh, Juno, Martin Garrix, Paul David Hewson, Benson Boone, Giorgio Tuinfort, Simon Carmody | Martin Garrix | — |
| Jaaniya | 58 | "Jaaniya" | Raajeev V Bhalla | Akshay K Saxena | — | Song recorded in 2013 |
| Play | 59 | "Sapphire" | Ed Sheeran, Arijit Singh | Ed Sheeran, Ilya Salmanzadeh, Johnny McDaid, Savan Kotecha, Mayur Puri, Arijit Singh, Avinash Chouhan | — | Singh has sung the Punjabi portion of the song |
| Play | 60 | "Sapphire feat. Arijit Singh" | Ed Sheeran, Arijit Singh | Ed Sheeran, Ilya Salmanzadeh, Johnny McDaid, Savan Kotecha, Mayur Puri, Arijit Singh, Avinash Chouhan | — | Extended version features additional vocals by Singh compared to the previous release. |
| Barkha | 61 | "Barkha" | Arijit Singh | Irshad Kamil | — | Earlier, the female version was sung by Sunidhi Chauhan |
| Dhul Gaye | 62 | "Dhul Gaye" | Arjuna Harjai | Surabhi Dashputra | — | — |
| The Ba***ds of Bollywood | 63 | "Badli Si Hawa Hai" | Anirudh Ravichander | Kumaar | Amira Gill | — |
| The Ba***ds of Bollywood | 64 | "Tu Pehli Tu Aakhri" | Shashwat Sachdev | Kumaar | — | — |
| Bhoomi | 65 | "Sukoon" | Salim–Sulaiman | Shraddha Pandit | — | The Bhoomi series, released on the duo's label, Merchant Records, supports independent artists and offers them a platform to collaborate and share their music. |
| Fitratein | 66 | "Fitratein" | Ronak Phukan | Syed Amir Hussain, Soham Majumdar | — | — |

== 2026 ==
=== Film songs ===
| Denotes films that have not yet been released |

| Film | No. | Song | Composer(s) | Writer(s) | Co-Singer(s) | Ref. | Note |
|---|---|---|---|---|---|---|---|
| Ikkis | 461 | "Sitaare" | White Noise Collectives | Amitabh Bhattacharya | | | |
| Border 2 | 462 | "Ghar Kab Aaoge" | Anu Malik, Mithoon | Javed Akhtar, Manoj Muntashir | Sonu Nigam, Vishal Mishra, Diljit Dosanjh, Roopkumar Rathod | | |
| Gandhi Talks | 463 | "Sunhari Kirne" (Hindi) | A. R. Rahman | Sameer Samant | | | |
| O'Romeo | 464 | "Hum To Tere Hi Liye The" | Vishal Bhardwaj | Gulzar | | | |
| O'Romeo | 465 | "Ishq Ka Fever" | Vishal Bhardwaj | Gulzar | | | |
| O'Romeo | 466 | "O' Romeo" | Vishal Bhardwaj | Gulzar | | | |
| Dhurandhar: The Revenge | 467 | "Phir Se" | Shashwat Sachdev | Irshad Kamil | | | |
| Bhooth Bangla | 468 | "Tu Hi Disda" | Pritam | Kumaar | Nikhita Gandhi | | |
| Ek Din | 469 | "Ek Din Title Track" | Ram Sampath | Irshad Kamil | | | |
| Ek Din | 470 | "Khwaab Dekhoon" | Ram Sampath | Irshad Kamil | Tarannum Malik Jain | | |
| Ek Din | 471 | "Konichiwa" | Ram Sampath | Irshad Kamil | Neha Karode, Rishi Singh | | |
| Ek Din | 472 | "Behke Yaar" | Ram Sampath | Irshad Kamil | Meghna Mishra | | |
| Ek Din | 473 | "Tadapnaa Judaa Judaa" | Ram Sampath | Irshad Kamil | | | |
| Cocktail 2 | 474 | "Jab Talak" | Pritam | Amitabh Bhattacharya | Akasa, Madhubanti Bagchi | | |
| Cocktail 2 | 475 | "Tujhko" | Pritam | Amitabh Bhattacharya | Sunidhi Chauhan | | |
| Cocktail 2 | 476 | "Leher" | Pritam | Amitabh Bhattacharya | | | |
| Awarapan 2 | 477 | "Yeh Awarapan" | Amaal Mallik | Rashmi Virag | | | |
| Pehla Pyaar Doosri Baar | 478 | "Purane Din" | Rochak Kohli | Kumaar | | | |
| Udta Teer | 479 | "Chann" | Sachin–Jigar | Amitabh Bhattacharya | | | |
| Ramayana: Part 1 | 480 | "Jai Jai Ram" | A.R. Rahman | Kumar Vishwas | Shreya Ghoshal | | |
| Ramayana: Part 1 | 481 | "Mangal Rang" | A.R. Rahman | Kumar Vishwas | Shreya Ghoshal | | |
| Maatrubhumi: May War Rest in Peace | 482 | "Maatrubhumi" | Himesh Reshammiya | Sameer Anjaan | Shreya Ghoshal, Master Mani Dharamkot | | |
| Main Na Raha Mera | 483 | "Main Na Raha Mera" | Rahul Nair | Dev Pandey | | | |
| King | 484 | "Tu Mil Jaaye" | Sachin-Jigar | Kumaar, Ed Sheeran | Madhubanti Bagchi, Ed Sheeran | | |

=== Non-film songs ===
| TV Series/Album | No. | Song | Composer(s) | Writer(s) | Co-Singer(s) | Note |
|---|---|---|---|---|---|---|
| Sukoon 2.0 | 67 | "Sukoon 2.0" | Salim-Sulaiman | Shraddha Pandit | — | — |
| Into You | 68 | "Into You" | Salim-Sulaiman | Shraddha Pandit, Shivansh Jindal | Ananya Sharma | — |
| Echoes Of Us | 69 | "Tere Sang" | Vaishnavi Sharma | Iulia Vantur | | Short Film |
| Oh Shiv Mere | 70 | "Oh Shiv Mere" | Mandeep Panghal | Kumaar | — | — |
| RAINA | 71 | "RAINA" | Shekhar Ravjiani | Priya Saraiya | — | — |
| Laiyaan | 72 | "Laiyaan" | Rutvik Talashilkar, Harjot Kaur | Youngveer | Ruaa Kayy, RUTVXK | — |
| Ya Tum | 73 | "Ya Tum" | Prajakta Shukre | Manan Bhardwaj | — | — |
| Linga Bhairavi Shayana Arati | 74 | "Linga Bhairavi Shayana Arati" | Bharadwaj Ravi | Rasika B | — | — |
| Ram Lalla | 75 | "Ram Lalla" | Sunny M.R. | MST | — | — |
| Sabad Naad | 76 | "Mann Simrat" | Ustad Sukhwant Singh | Sri Guru Arjan Dev Ji | — | Sabad Naad is the world’s largest raag-based kirtan project, Spanning all 62 raags in the Sri Guru Granth Sahib ji and select Gurbani folk traditions. |
