= Main Tera Hero (soundtrack) =

Soundtrack album by Sajid–Wajid
- Released: 3 March 2014
- Genre: Feature film soundtrack
- Length: 25:53
- Language: Hindi
- Label: T-Series
- Producer: Sajid–Wajid

Sajid–Wajid chronology
Jai Ho (2014)	Main Tera Hero (2014)	Heropanti (2014)
External audio
- Audio Jukebox on YouTube

Main Tera Hero is the soundtrack album to the 2014 film of the same name directed by David Dhawan and starring Varun Dhawan, Ileana D'Cruz and Nargis Fakhri. The soundtrack featured seven songs composed by Sajid–Wajid and lyrics written by Kumaar, Kausar Munir, Amitabh Bhattacharya and Danish Sabri. The album was released under the T-Series label on 3 March 2014 to positive reviews from critics.

== Background ==
The soundtrack was composed by Sajid–Wajid, while the lyrics were penned by Kumaar, Kausar Munir, Amitabh Bhattacharya and Danish Sabri. Kumaar penned three songs for the film, one being co-written with Bhattacharya, and Kausar wrote lyrics for two songs, assisted by Danish Sabri. Kausar admitted that she had previously written lyrics for "Har Ek Friend Kamina Hota Hai" from Chashme Baddoor (2013), where David was keen on her involvement as the lyricist. The duo had also composed the tune for "Palat – Tera Hero Idhar Hai", while David knew what she wanted; describing the songwriting process, Kausar felt that songs which appear to be easy, are seemingly hard, summarizing "To crack this very simple yet catchy and populist vibe is hard, and I don't understand the game of hits and flops".

"Palat – Tera Hero Idhar Hai" was inspired by the R. D. Burman composed "Jahan Teri Yeh Nazar Hai", from the film Kaalia (1981). Sajid Khan stated "... It was not a conscious attempt (about the resemblance between the two songs). I have been a huge fan of RD Burman. I grown up listening to his music. I won't deny any influence in our work. The lyrics and the vibe of the song are similar but the tune is different." The song "Bhole Mera Dil Maane Na" is a spoof of "Badtameez Dil" from the movie Yeh Jawaani Hai Deewani (2013), with the former having the same tune.

== Marketing and release ==
The song "Besharmi Ki Height", sung by Benny Dayal and Shalmali Kholgade, was the first to be released; an accompanying music video was unveiled on 17 February 2014. The soundtrack was released under the T-Series label on 3 March 2014. The release coincided with a music launch event held at Inorbit Mall in Malad, Mumbai, with the presence of Varun and Nargis (Ileana could not attend the launch event) and the principal crew members. To capitalize on the popularity of the song "Palat – Tera Hero Idhar Hai", a remix version of the song was attached to the theatrical prints of Ragini MMS 2, which released on 21 March 2014—instead of the theatrical trailer—marking the first such instance.

== Reception ==
Devesh Sharma of Filmfare gave 4 stars out of 5 and said "This breezy soundtrack offers a good antidote for dull evenings. One can say that Sajid-Wajid are certainly back in business. They might not have experimented much but have given us the classic Hindi film sound that has gone missing in today's times." Joginder Tuteja in his review for Rediff.com rated 3 out of 5 and mentioned "The Main Tera Hero soundtrack has no dull moments. Songs like Palat and Besharmi keep the fun element intact right through." Rajiv Vijayakar of Bollywood Hungama wrote "The David Dhawan-Sajid-Wajid combo rocks on [...] we must compliment the team for their mainstream masala musical magic".

== Track listing ==
No.	Title	Lyrics	Singer(s)	Length
1.	"Besharmi Ki Height"	Kumaar	Benny Dayal, Shalmali Kholgade	4:49
2.	"Palat – Tera Hero Idhar Hai"	Kausar Munir, Danish Sabri	Arijit Singh	4:31
3.	"Shanivaar Raati"	Kumaar	Arijit Singh, Shalmali Kholgade	4:21
4.	"Galat Baat Hai"	Kausar Munir, Danish Sabri	Neeti Mohan, Javed Ali	4:20
5.	"Besharmi Ki Height" (Remix by DJ Notorious)	Kumaar	Benny Dayal, Shalmali Kholgade	4:11
6.	"Shanivaar Raati" (Remix by DJ Chetas)	Kumaar	Arijit Singh, Shalmali Kholgade	3:41
Total length:				25:53
