= Hasleen Kaur =

Indian model

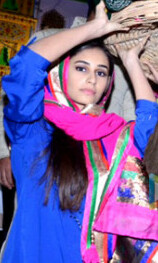
- Kaur in 2014
- Born: Binnaguri, West Bengal, India
- Education: Jesus and Mary College, University of Delhi; Indian Institute of Mass Communication
- Occupations: Model, actress
- Height: 1.75 m (5 ft 9 in)
- Spouse: Amber Rana (m. 2018)
- Beauty pageant titleholder
- Title: Femina Miss India Earth 2011
- Years active: 2009- present
- Major competitions: Femina Miss India 2011 (Miss India Earth); Miss Earth 2011 (Unplaced)

Hasleen Kaur is an Indian actress, model and beauty pageant titleholder. She was the first runner up at the Pantaloons Femina Miss India and represented India at the Miss Earth 2011 beauty pageant on 3 December 2011. She has appeared in several advertisements before making her Bollywood debut in the 2014 movie Karle Pyaar Karle.

== Early life and education ==
Hasleen Kaur was raised in Delhi. She did her graduation in English from Jesus and Mary College, and later received a diploma from Indian Institute of Mass Communication, New Delhi.

== Career ==
Kaur has modeled for several advertisements. She also worked as an Elite Model and appeared in Elite Fashion Calendar in 2011.

=== Femina Miss India ===
She participated in 2011 Pantaloons Femina Miss India pageant and won the Femina Miss India Earth 2011, where Kanishtha Dhankar was crowned the Femina Miss India World. Femina Miss India Earth 2010 and reigning Miss Earth 2010, Nicole Faria, crowned her at the end of the event.

=== Miss Earth 2011 ===
She competed at the Miss Earth 2011 pageant which was held on 3 December in Manila, Philippines, but was unplaced.

== Filmography ==
Year	Film	Role	Language	Notes	Ref
2014	Karle Pyaar Karle	Preet	Hindi	Lead Role	
2022	CAT	Babita	Hindi	Supporting Actress	
2022	Mili	Hasleen	Hindi	Supporting Actress	
2023	Tu Jhoothi Main Makkaar	Minny	Hindi	Supporting Actress	

Awards and achievements
Preceded by Nicole Faria	Miss Earth India; 2011	Succeeded by Prachi Mishra
