= Jahan Teri Yeh Nazar Hai =

Song by Kishore Kumar

from the album Kaalia
- Released: 1981
- Recorded: 1981
- Genre: Filmi
- Length: 5:26
- Composer: R. D. Burman
- Lyricist: Majrooh Sultanpuri

Kaalia track listing
- 1. "Dil To Dete Nahi"; 2. "Jab Se Tumko Dekha"; 3. "Jahan Teri Yeh Nazar Hai"; 4. "Kaun Kisi Ko Baandh Saka"; 5. "Sanam Tum Jahan Mera Dil Wahan"; 6. "Tum Saath Ho Jab Apne"

Music video
- "Jahan Teri Yeh Nazar Hai" on YouTube

Jahan Teri Yeh Nazar Hai (transl. Where your sight is) is a 1981 Hindi film song by Kishore Kumar in the film Kaalia, written and directed by Tinnu Anand, the film was produced by Iqbal Singh. The film stars Amitabh Bachchan (in the title role), Parveen Babi, Asha Parekh, Kader Khan, Pran, Amjad Khan, K.N. Singh and Jagdeep.

The film credits R.D. Burman with composing the music. However, credit may belong elsewhere. A song named "Hele Maali" by Iranian-American musician Zia Atabay came out in 1977, and has the same tune as "Jahan Teri Yeh Nazar Hai". Amitabh Bachchan has also claimed credit for it. The lyrics of the song were written by Majrooh Sultanpuri.

== Music video ==
In the film the Amitabh Bachhan character sings the song in a nightclub while pinching an expensive diamond necklace off the neck of the beautiful posh girl he is dancing with, all the while thwarting the designs of the girl's original dance partner (Amjad Khan) who had set out to do the same thing himself. The song is a series of boasts about his own prowess at sleight of hand and taunts directed at the rival thief.

== Notes ==
- The song, Jahan Teri Yeh Nazar Hai influenced the song, Palat - Tera Hero Idhar Hai featured on the 2014 film, Main Tera Hero. This song was inspired by Zia Atabay - Hele Mali Iranian Singer which was released 1977.
