= Karle Pyaar Karle =

2014 film by Rajesh Pandey

- Theatrical Poster
- Directed by: Rajesh Pandey
- Written by: Rajesh Pandey; Reshu Nath; Rahul Patel
- Produced by: Suneel Darshan
- Starring: Shiv Darshan; Hasleen Kaur; Aham Sharma
- Cinematography: Navneet Misser
- Edited by: Sahana
- Music by: Sahil Rayyan Ameen; Rashid Khan; Prashant Singh; Mumzy Stranger; Meet Bros Anjjan
- Production company: Shree Krishna International
- Release date: 17 January 2014
- Running time: 110 minutes
- Country: India
- Language: Hindi

Karle Pyaar Karle (transl. Come, let's love) is a Hindi romantic action film directed by Rajesh Pandey and produced by Suneel Darshan. The film features debutants Shiv Darshan and Hasleen Kaur in the lead roles. The film, as scheduled, was released on 17 January 2014. It was inspired by the 2003 French film Love Me If You Dare. Karle Pyaar Karle was released on 1000 screens across India.

== Cast ==
- Shiv Darshan as Kabir
- Hasleen Kaur as Preet
- Aham Sharma as Likhit
- Mahesh Thakur as Kabir's brother
- Aditya Kohli as Kabir's Friend
- Ankit Raaj as Goldie
- Sanjay Sharma as Bulbul Pandey
- Aru Krishansh Verma as Bunty
- Yash Acharya as Little Kabir
- Rumi Khan as D.G.

== Plot ==
Karle Pyaar Karle is the love story of two rebels, Preet and Kabir, who are playing the game of their lives. Since their childhood, Kabir and Preet have indulged in playing dangerous games, trying to fight the fear and complexes within. In a desperate moment, 8-year-old Kabir indulged in an act that led him to the juvenile home. In order to protect him, his mother decided to leave town so as to escape the harsh punishment. After travelling from one city to another for twelve years, the family returns to their home town where Kabir and Preet reconnect. This marks the beginning of a new chapter of dares and games.

Preet starts believing that they are ill-fated and that it is best that they stay away from each other. Kabir firmly believes that they can only survive if they are together. The movie ends in Orissa.

== Critical reception ==
Rediff.com said that watching the film was a "waste of time", while the Times of India rated it 1.5/5.

== Box office ==
On its opening day, the film collected 2-25 million, which overall on the first weekend after opening it raised approximately 70 million

== Soundtrack ==
Karle Pyaar Karle

Soundtrack album
- Released: 17 December 2013
- Length: 36:35
- Label: Sony Music

The official soundtrack was composed Sahil Rayyan, Rashid Khan, Prashant Singh, Mumzy Stranger and Meet Bros Anjjan. The lyrics were written by Rashid Khan, Shakeel Azmi, Kumaar, Suneel Darshan, Yusuf Khan, Mumzy Stranger, Paras Chaurasia and Mehmood Arfat. The soundtrack album released on 17 December 2013 .

No.	Title	Lyrics	Music	Singer(s)	Length
1.	"Karle Pyaar Karle"	Kumaar	Meet Bros Anjjan	Benny Dayal, Palak Muchhal and Monali Thakur	04:36
2.	"Teri Saanson Mein"	Rashid Khan	Rashid Khan	Arijit Singh, Palak Muchhal, Amit Mishra	06:22
3.	"O Darling"	Shakeel Azmi	Prashant Singh	Amit Mishra and Shashaa Tirupati	05:04
4.	"Mutasir"	Rashid Khan	Rashid Khan	Javed Ali	05:04
5.	"Tanhaai"	Mehmood Arafat and Rashid Khan	Rayyan Ameen	Arijit Singh, Sahil Rayyan, Amnah Noor	04:57
6.	"Kurbaan"	Mumzy Stranger & Natasha Tah	Mumzy Stranger	Mumzy Stranger and Natasha Tah	06:01
7.	"Soni Soni Akkha Nu"	Yusuf Khan and Paras Chaurasia	Rayyan Ameen	Sahil Rayyan and Tamara	04:31
Total length:					36:35
