= Cocktail (soundtrack) =

Cocktail (Original Motion Picture Soundtrack)

Soundtrack album by Pritam
- Released: 22 June 2012
- Recorded: 2011–2012
- Genre: Feature film soundtrack
- Length: 53:44
- Languages: Hindi; Punjabi
- Label: Sony Music India
- Producer: Pritam

Pritam chronology
Ferrari Ki Sawaari (2012)	Cocktail (Original Motion Picture Soundtrack) (2012)	Barfi! (2012)

Cocktail (Original Motion Picture Soundtrack) is the soundtrack to the 2012 film of the same name directed by Homi Adajania and produced by Eros International and Dinesh Vijan under Maddock Films, starring Saif Ali Khan, Deepika Padukone, Diana Penty. The film's musical score is composed by Pritam and lyrics written by Irshad Kamil and Amitabh Bhattacharya. The songs are produced under techno-pop and electronica sounds with influences of Sufi music from North India and Pakistan. The soundtrack was first released under the T-Series and Eros Music labels on 22 June 2012. As of 2025, the audio rights have been held by Sony Music India, as most of the audio catalogs owned previously by Eros Music are now transferred to the latter.

== Development ==
Pritam composed the musical score in his third collaboration with Saif after Love Aaj Kal (2009) and Agent Vinod (2012). As with his previous films, Pritam would compose the tunes while Irshad Kamil would write the lyrics that match the tune. Five songs for the film had been curated for the film's music, except for "Yaariyan" which had been composed instantaneously.

Vijan considered the film's music and score as the USP of the film. He wanted the songs that relate with the characters and bring out their personalities and traits and seamlessly integrate with the storyline instead of random transitions to the music interrupting the screenplay. He acknowledged that "the songs have been shot entirely from Homi's vision, and the result has been fantastic". According to Pritam, his collaboration with Kamil owed him a lot due to the phonetic quality of the words. He added, "Being a Bengali, my ears are more dependent on the sound of the words rather than their meaning, and Irshad bhai writes words that instantly appeal to my senses".

The soundtrack is heavily influenced by Sufi music. Pritam attributed the lyrics of "Tumhi Ho Bandhu" where its catchy hook line originated as a Sufi tune. However, the underlying theme of the soundtrack had a folksy nature. The song "Yaariyan" drew inspiration from Coldplay's "In My Place" (2002), while Pritam clarified that he used the drum pattern which was common to that track. Vijan acquired the rights for the Pakistani Sufi song "Alif Allah" performed and written by Arif Lohar, which was newly arranged by Pritam.

== Critical reception ==
Joginder Tuteja of Bollywood Hungama rated four-and-a-half of five and wrote "Cocktail is a wonderful soundtrack which also boasts of best ensemble sound that one has heard this year so far [...] the album delivers much more than what one had expected from it and is inarguably one of the classiest that Pritam has composed since Saif's own Love Aaj Kal." Karthik Srinivasan of Milliblog described it as a "bloody heady cocktail of a soundtrack from Pritam!" Vipin Nair of Music Aloud rated 7.5 (out of 10) stating "After Ferrari Ki Sawaari, another engaging soundtrack from Pritam with minimal past influence, Cocktail." A critic from News18 wrote that the album "strikes the right note with its youthful fervor". Nirmika Singh of Hindustan Times described it as "worth a listen for the first four tracks on the album — they make up for what the compilation seems to lack in its entirety." Anand Vaishnav of IndiaTimes wrote "True to its name, this soundtrack is an addictive cocktail of groovy sounds". Lisa Tsering of The Hollywood Reporter described the soundtrack as "a modern mix of Pakistani and Punjabi sounds with dance club electronica." Joe Leydon of Variety wrote "Composer Pritam and lyricist Irshad Kamil emphasize techno-pop sounds in the musical sequences".

== Track listing ==
Cocktail (Original Motion Picture Soundtrack) track listing
No.	Title	Lyrics	Singer(s)	Length
1.	"Tumhi Ho Bandhu 1.0"	Irshad Kamil	Kavita Seth, Neeraj Shridhar	4:42
2.	"Daaru Desi"	Irshad Kamil	Benny Dayal, Shalmali Kholgade, Neeraj Shridhar	4:30
3.	"Yaariyan"	Irshad Kamil	K. Mohan, Shilpa Rao, B Praak	6:18
4.	"Second-Hand-Jawaani"	Amitabh Bhattacharya	Miss Pooja, Neha Kakkar, Nakash Aziz	4:03
5.	"Tera Naam Japdi Phiran"	Irshad Kamil	Javed Bashir, Nikhil D'Souza, Shefali Alvares	3:39
6.	"Luttna (Saif Ul Malook)"	Irshad Kamil	Masuma Anwar, Sahir Ali Bagga, Anupam Amod	5:01
7.	"Alif Allah (Jugni)"	Arif Lohar	Arif Lohar, Harshdeep Kaur	6:57
8.	"Yaariyan (Reprise)"	Irshad Kamil	Sunidhi Chauhan, Arijit Singh	5:14
9.	"Luttna (Version 2)"	Irshad Kamil	Masuma Anwar, Sahir Ali Bagga, Anupam Amod	4:44
10.	"Tera Naam Japdi Phiran (Remix)"	Irshad Kamil	Javed Bashir, Nikhil D'Souza, Shefali Alvares	4:11
11.	"Main Sharaabi" (Music by: Yo Yo Honey Singh)	Irshad Kamil	Yo Yo Honey Singh, Imran Aziz Mian	4:25
Total length:				53:44

== Accolades ==
Accolades for Cocktail (Original Motion Picture Soundtrack)
Award (Note: Awards, festivals and organisations are in alphabetical order.)	Date of ceremony (Note: Date is linked to the article about the awards held that year, wherever possible.)	Category	Recipient(s) and nominee(s)	Result	Ref.
Apsara Film & Television Producers Guild Awards (Note: Also known as Star Guild Awards.)	16 February 2013	Best Music Director	Pritam	Nominated	
Apsara Film & Television Producers Guild Awards	16 February 2013	Best Lyricist	Irshad Kamil (for the song "Tumhi Ho Bandhu")	Nominated	
Apsara Film & Television Producers Guild Awards	16 February 2013	Best Male Playback Singer	Neeraj Shridhar (for the song "Tumhi Ho Bandhu")	Nominated	
Apsara Film & Television Producers Guild Awards	16 February 2013	Best Female Playback Singer	Kavita Seth (for the song "Tumhi Ho Bandhu")	Nominated	
BIG Star Entertainment Awards	31 December 2012	Most Entertaining Song	"Tumhi Ho Bandhu"	Nominated	
BIG Star Entertainment Awards	31 December 2012	Most Entertaining Singer – Female	Kavita Seth (for the song "Tumhi Ho Bandhu")	Nominated	
Bollywood Hungama Surfers' Choice Music Awards	16 February 2013	Best Soundtrack	—	Nominated	
Bollywood Hungama Surfers' Choice Music Awards	16 February 2013	Best Song	"Tumhi Ho Bandhu"	Nominated	
Bollywood Hungama Surfers' Choice Music Awards	16 February 2013	Best Male Playback Singer	Neeraj Shridhar (for the song "Tumhi Ho Bandhu")	Nominated	
Bollywood Hungama Surfers' Choice Music Awards	16 February 2013	Best Female Playback Singer	Kavita Seth (for the song "Tumhi Ho Bandhu")	Nominated	
Bollywood Hungama Surfers' Choice Music Awards	16 February 2013	Best Female Playback Singer	Shalmali Kholgade (for the song "Daaru Desi")	Nominated	
Bollywood Hungama Surfers' Choice Music Awards	16 February 2013	Best Lyricist	Irshad Kamil (for the song "Tumhi Ho Bandhu")	Nominated	
Filmfare Awards	20 January 2013	Best Music Director	Pritam	Won	
Filmfare Awards	20 January 2013	Best Female Playback Singer	Kavita Seth (for the song "Tumhi Ho Bandhu")	Nominated	
International Indian Film Academy Awards	6 July 2013	Best Music Director	Pritam	Won	
International Indian Film Academy Awards	6 July 2013	Best Female Playback Singer	Kavita Seth (for song "Phir Le Aya Dil")	Nominated	
Mirchi Music Awards	7 February 2013	Album of The Year	—	Nominated	
Mirchi Music Awards	7 February 2013	Song of The Year	"Tumhi Ho Bandhu"	Nominated	
Mirchi Music Awards	7 February 2013	Music Composer of The Year	Pritam (for song "Phir Le Aya Dil")	Nominated	
Mirchi Music Awards	7 February 2013	Female Vocalist of The Year	Kavita Seth (for the song "Tumhi Ho Bandhu")	Nominated	
Mirchi Music Awards	7 February 2013	Upcoming Male Vocalist of The Year	Javed Bashir (for the song "Tera Naam Japdi Phiran (Version 2)")	Nominated	
Screen Awards	12 January 2013	Best Female Playback Singer	Kavita Seth (for the song "Tumhi Ho Bandhu")	Nominated	
Stardust Awards	26 January 2013	New Musical Sensation Singer – Female	Shalmali Kholgade (for the song "Daaru Desi")	Won (Note: Also for "Pareshan" from Ishaqzaade (2012))	
Times of India Film Awards	6 April 2013	Best Music Director	Pritam	Nominated	
Times of India Film Awards	6 April 2013	Best Playback Singer – Female	Kavita Seth (for song "Phir Le Aya Dil")	Nominated	
Zee Cine Awards	7 January 2013	Best Music Director	Pritam	Won	
Zee Cine Awards	7 January 2013	Best Lyricist	Irshad Kamil (for the song "Tumhi Ho Bandhu")	Nominated	
Zee Cine Awards	7 January 2013	Best Female Playback Singer	Kavita Seth (for the song "Tumhi Ho Bandhu")	Nominated	
Zee Cine Awards	7 January 2013	Song of the Year	"Tumhi Ho Bandhu"	Nominated	
