= Dangal (soundtrack) =

Soundtrack album by Pritam
- Released: 23 November 2016 (Hindi); 26 November 2016 (Tamil & Telugu)
- Recorded: 2015–2016
- Genre: Feature film soundtrack
- Length: 26:46
- Languages: Hindi; Tamil; Telugu
- Label: Zee Music Company
- Producers: Aamir Khan; Kiran Rao; Siddharth Roy Kapur

Pritam chronology
Ae Dil Hai Mushkil (2016)	Dangal (2016)	Jagga Jasoos (2017)

Singles from Dangal
- 1. "Haanikaarak Bapu" Released: 4 November 2016; 2. "Dhaakad" Released: 11 November 2016; 3. "Gilehriyaan" Released: 16 November 2016; 4. "Dangal" Released: 20 November 2016

Dangal is the soundtrack album for the 2016 Hindi sports biopic film of the same name. The film directed by Nitesh Tiwari and produced by Aamir Khan, Kiran Rao and Siddharth Roy Kapur, features music composed by Pritam and lyrics written by Amitabh Bhattacharya in Hindi, Rajesh Malarvannan in Tamil and Rajshri Sudhakar in Telugu.

The film marks the second collaboration of Aamir Khan and Pritam, after Dhoom 3 (2013). The songs were composed at Panchgani House in June 2015. Daler Mehndi had sung the title track of the film. The song "Dhaakad" was sung by rapper Raftaar in Haryanvi, Tamil and Telugu (as "Jaakirathai" and "Jaagradha") and became popular. Raftaar in an interview on News18 stated that "I believe lady luck is just shining on me. I'm pretty excited with the projects lined up so far. It has been my childhood dream to work alongside Aamir Khan and this is finally materialising. Moreover, I'm happy to be associated with a project that emphasises women empowerment as that's a cause I truly believe in." The song received 12 million views, in three days and followed by its popularity Aamir Khan, rapped his own version of the song and included it in the soundtrack album.

The music rights were purchased by Zee Music Company. The Hindi version of the soundtrack album features seven songs, while the Tamil and Telugu version featured only two songs. Initially, before the soundtrack album was released, the makers launched four singles from the film. The full album was launched on 23 November 2016. The soundtrack of the dubbed Tamil and Telugu versions were released on 26 November 2016. The album received positive reviews from critics. Due to the success of the film in China and Japan, the film's soundtrack album is set to have a Japanese release published by Rambling Records on 13 April 2018.

== Critical response ==
BollywoodLife stated that "Dangal is not an album you would expect from someone like Pritam, who gave us some melodious tracks in Ae Dil Hai Mushkil, to eke out of his keyboard. However, the rustic soundtrack is proof enough that the composer can still work wonders even he has to work outside his comfort zone. Still, it is the lyricist Amitabh Bhattacharya who has an upper hand in making these songs delightful. Together with Pritam, they are now the Jai-Veeru of the Bollywood music world." and rated the album 3.5 out of 5. Koimoi.com rated 3 out of 5 and stated that the soundtrack album is highly entertaining. Bollywood Hungama rated 3.5/5 and summarised that "The music of Dangal is largely entertaining and while it has a predominantly situational feel to it, all credit to Pritam and Amitabh Bhattacharya for still going ahead and adding good enough ingredients to the songs that are set to keeps the pace of the narrative flowing." Indiawest rated the album 4 out of 5. Filmfare rated the album 4 out of 5, and also stated that "Dangal is a pleasant surprise by Pritam and he should provide us with several more such albums. Coming in the wake of Ae Dil Hai Mushkil, he's indeed ended the year on a high" India.com rated the album 3.5 out of 5 and summarised that "Pritam gives an interesting mix here which are rooted and refreshingly original." GlamSham rated the album 4 out of 5 and summarised it as "A complete album with a variety of songs, that are not just in keeping with the story and script but are interesting and entertaining as well. The regional flavour may restrict its appeal somewhat, but since the film is Haryana based, this was essential. While Salman's SULTAN audio was more commercial and so was the film, DANGAL audio is a class-plus-mass deal and our picks are Haanikarak Bapu, Dhaakad (both versions), Naina and Idiot Banna. The best thing is that all the big names (in the credits) have been utilised and aptly, and are not there just as decorative pieces. The situational numbers will aid the proceedings and will surely attain popularity."

== Marketing ==
The makers released the first promotional single track "Haanikarak Baapu" on 4 November 2016. Aamir goes into the 'Hitler' dad mode and makes his girls undergo rigorous training to become wrestlers. The song showcases the struggle of Geeta and Babita, as they want to be like any other girl their age, but their stern father, Mahavir wants them to win the elusive gold medal for India. His daughters beseech him, "Hum pe thodi daya toh karo, hum nanhe baalak hai," but he is unrelenting. And for all their efforts, "phir bhi khush na hua Mogambo!" The song, penned by Amitabh Bhattacharya and composed by Pritam, has a rustic Haryanvi feel to it. Sarwar Khan and Sartaz Khan Barna's voice captures the song's comical mood of kids complaining of strict fathers. The second single track "Dhaakad" was sung by Raftaar whom Aamir Khan introduced. Within its release on 11 November 2016, the song became popular with 12 million views in 3 days. Followed by its popularity Aamir, rapped his own version of the song and included in the album. Raftaar in an interview on News18 stated that "I believe lady luck is just shining on me. I'm pretty excited with the projects lined up so far. It has been my childhood dream to work alongside Aamir Khan and this is finally materialising. Moreover, I'm happy to be associated with a project that emphasises women empowerment as that's a cause I truly believe in." The third single track "Gilheriyaan" was released on 16 November 2016. The title track sung by Daler Mehndi was released on 20 November 2016. The complete soundtrack album was released by Zee Music Company on 23 November 2016. The Tamil and Telugu versions of the album featuring only two songs were released on 26 November 2016.

== Track listing ==
=== Hindi ===
All lyrics are written by Amitabh Bhattacharya.

No.	Title	Singer(s)	Length
1.	"Haanikaarak Bapu"	Sarwar Khan, Sartaz Khan Barna	4:22
2.	"Dhaakad"	Raftaar	2:56
3.	"Gilehriyaan"	Jonita Gandhi, Neha Kakkar	3:40
4.	"Dangal"	Daler Mehandi	4:59
5.	"Naina"	Arijit Singh	3:45
6.	"Dhaakad" (Aamir Khan version)	Aamir Khan	2:56
7.	"Idiot Banna"	Nooran Sisters	4:08
Total length:			26:46

=== Tamil ===
All lyrics are written by Rajesh A. Malarvannan.

No.	Title	Singer(s)	Length
1.	"Discipline"	R.S.Rakthaksh (Chorus: R. Snjeevi, K. Haripriya, V. Harini)	4:22
2.	"Jaagirathai"	Raftaar	2:56
Total length:			7:19

=== Telugu ===
All lyrics are written by Rajshri Sudhakar.

No.	Title	Singer(s)	Length
1.	"Discipline"	R.S.Rakthaksh (Chorus: R. Snjeevi, K. Haripriya, V. Harini)	4:22
2.	"Jaagartha"	Raftaar	2:56
Total length:			7:19
