= Phir Wahi (song) =

Song performed by Pritam Chakraborty

Song by Pritam feat. Arijit Singh
- Language: Hindi
- Genre: Narrative Ballad
- Composer: Pritam
- Lyricist: Amitabh Bhattacharya

Phir Wahi (transl. Then the same) is a Hindi song from the soundtrack of Jagga Jasoos. The song is written by Amitabh Bhattacharya, composed by Pritam and sung by Arijit Singh. The song's music video is pictured upon actor Ranbir Kapoor.

== Music video ==
The song's music video focuses upon actor Ranbir Kapoor who searches his missing father.

== Release and reception ==
Indian Express in its review wrote- "The song is about relationships that have betrayed or lost with time passing by, but one fine day you just happen to cross through it".

Hindustan Times in their review wrote – "The song highlights the narrative of Jagga (Ranbir Kapoor) who is on the quest for his father, who seems to have left him forever. Jagga, however, is adamant on finding him".

India Today in their review wrote "Composed by Pritam and sung by Arijit Singh, Phir Wahi is a song about a son looking back at his carefree time spent with his father as a kid.

News18 wrote- "It captures the emotions that the father-son duo share.

Times of India in its review wrote – "Phir Wahi shows Ranbir Kapoor's character reminiscing about all the time he has spent with his father, who is now missing. This emotional song is sure to tug at your heartstrings".
