= Palat – Tera Hero Idhar Hai =

Song composed by Sajid–Wajid performed by Atmaram Bhide

- Varun Dhawan in the music video of the song

Song by Arijit Singh

from the album Main Tera Hero
- Released: 3 March 2014
- Genre: Filmi; Pop; Pop-folk
- Length: 4:30
- Label: T-Series
- Composer: Sajid–Wajid
- Lyricist: Kausar Munir
- Producer: David Dhawan

Main Tera Hero track listing
- 1. "Besharmi Ki Height"; 2. "Palat – Tera Hero Idhar Hai"; 3. "Shanivaar Raati"; 4. "Galat Baat Hai"; 5. "Besharmi Ki Height (Remix)"; 6. "Galat Baat Hai (Remix)"

Music video
- "Palat – Tera Hero Idhar Hai" on YouTube

"Palat – Tera Hero Idhar Hai" (transl. Turn around – Your hero is here) is a Hindi song from the 2014 Hindi film Main Tera Hero. Composed by Sajid–Wajid, the song is sung by Arijit Singh, with lyrics penned by Kausar Munir and Danish Sabri. The music video features Varun Dhawan and Ileana D'Cruz.

== Background ==
The song is composed by Sajid–Wajid and rendered by Arijit Singh, marking their first collaboration which is followed by "Raat Bhar" from Heropanti which was released the same year. It is also the first song which features Dhawan in a song sung by Singh, followed by "Samjhawan" from Humpty Sharma Ki Dulhania, which was also released on the same year. Singh has performed another track in the album, titled "Shanivaar Raati" a duet with Shalmali Kholgade.

The producers of the film capitulating on the popularity of the song "Palat – Tera Hero Idhar Hai" from the soundtrack attached a remix version of it along with the theatrical prints of Ragini MMS 2 which released on 21 March 2014—instead of the theatrical trailer—marking the first such instance. Some critics compared the track, "Palat – Tera Hero Idhar Hai" to the 1981 song, "Jahan Teri Yeh Nazar Hai" from the soundtrack of the film, Kaalia. Talking about the resemblance, Sajid stated: "I won't deny any influence in our work, but I am not sure to what extent it goes". According to him the lyrics and the vibe of the song are similar, though the tune is different. The song was talked for its similarity with many tracks performed by Govinda.

The song is directed by David Dhawan who is contributed by his elder son, Rohit. The lyrics of the song is penned by Kausar Munir who stated; " To crack this very simple yet catchy and populist vibe is hard, and I don't understand the game of hits and flops". Additional lyrics of the song is penned by Danish Sabri. Since the song required Dhawan to involve a lot of heavy duty steps on the ground with body weight balanced on the hands solely and to avoid any injuries to his wrist and hand, he suggested wearing biker's gloves.

The promotional released music video features, Nargis Fakhri through various snippets from the film and songs like "Galat Baat Hai" and "Shanivaar Raat". However the video used in the movie, features Varun Dhawan and Ileana D'Cruz with no frames of Fakhri. In the music video of the song, he dances in the middle of a basketball court, on a wall and even while hanging from an artificial climbing rockface. The song starts as Dhawan tries wooing Ileana on a college campus who is then accompanied by a bunch of guys, showing some Bollywood dance moves.

== Release and response ==
A 15-second teaser of the song was released on YouTube handle of T-Series, on 26 February 2014. The promotional music video of the song was uploaded on 28 February 2014. The full version of the audio track was released digitally on 3 March 2014, in the soundtrack of the album.

Talking about the popularity of the song, Ileana D'Cruz said; "Songs are such an important part of the film. I am very happy and surprised that 'Palat' became a big hit". Regarding the success of the song, Varun Dhawan commented: "While promoting the film in various cities, I was inundated with requests to dance on Palat. In Indore, when we asked the crowd to select a track, this song was the unanimous choice. They went berserk when it was played".

== Critical reception ==
Joginder Tuteja from Rediff.com felt the song has "catchy beats and a foot-tapping rhythm", calling it as "the height of the masala score". Devesh Sharma from Filmfare talked about the resemblance of the song with the RD Burman's composition and commented: "Singh sings it in full Kishore Kumar mode and you can’t help but smile at the nostalgic feel that it provides as well is own comic resonance". Bollywood Hungama's Rajiv Vijayakar called Arijit Singh a "revelation", who further stated: "This is terrain he has never been visualized in before, and the singer shines".

== Track listing and formats ==
- Original Motion Picture Soundtrack
1. "Palat Tera Hero Idhar Hai" – 4:30
2. "Palat Tera Hero Idhar Hai (Remix)" – 2:36

== Accolades ==
Year	Award	Category	Nominee	Result	Ref
2014	Stardust Awards	Best Male Playback Singer	Arijit Singh	Nominated	
