= Kaalia =

- Promotional poster
- Directed by: Tinnu Anand
- Written by: Inder Raj Anand; Tinnu Anand; Santosh Sah; Shahjahan; Taher
- Produced by: Iqbal Singh
- Starring: Amitabh Bachchan; Parveen Babi; Asha Parekh; Kader Khan; Amjad Khan; Pran
- Cinematography: Pravin Bhatt
- Edited by: A. Habib
- Music by: Rahul Dev Burman; Lyrics: Majrooh Sultanpuri
- Distributed by: Bobby Enterprises; Polydor
- Release date: 25 December 1981
- Country: India
- Language: Hindi

Kaalia is a 1981 Indian Hindi-language action thriller film, written and directed by Tinnu Anand, and produced by Iqbal Singh. The film stars Amitabh Bachchan (in the title role), Parveen Babi, Asha Parekh, Kader Khan, Pran, Amjad Khan, K.N. Singh and Jagdeep. The music is by R.D. Burman, while the lyrics are by Majrooh Sultanpuri.

The film was another classic from Bachchan's "angry young man" era. The film is also remembered for having the classic upbeat song "Jahan Teri Yeh Nazar Hai" (sung by Kishore Kumar). It continues to be played at parties and nightclubs, along with being considered one of the most iconic songs of the 1980s.

It was later remade in Kannada in 1984 as Huliyaada Kaala starring Tiger Prabhakar and in Tamil in 1987 as Cooliekkaran starring Vijayakanth.

== Plot ==
Kallu lives with his older brother Shamu, sister-in-law Shanti, and their little daughter Munni. He is intelligent but spends his time idly playing with the neighbour's kids. His older brother gets into an accident while at work at the mill and loses his arms. He loses his job and needs money for his treatment. Kallu begs his brother's boss, Shahani Seth, for monetary help, but he refuses. Kallu breaks into Shahani's safe to get the money, but it proves to be too late as Shamu dies. Shahani then throws Kallu in jail for nine months, where he meets the men that teach him crime.

After his release, Kallu gets a different self named "Kaalia", a different as well as a stronger man. He and his accomplices steal the gold that the boss had been smuggling at the mill. Then he burns down the mill as retribution for his brother's death. He goes to jail again, this time for two years. His accomplices lie to his sister-in-law by telling her that he is in America earning money for her and her daughter. They move from poverty to riches. In jail, Kaalia meets the jailor Raghvir Singh, a smart, ethical, strong man, whose daughter was kidnapped by one of the prisoners as a child. After Kaalia is released from prison, he is bent on seeking vengeance and eventually pairs up with a woman named Shalini.

The boss kidnaps Kaalia's niece and forces her mother to testify against Kaalia at a murder trial. He is found guilty for a murder he didn't commit and escapes from prison to find his niece. At first, the warden chases him, but once he knows the true story, decides to help him. They go to the boss's place and not only find the little girl, but also the sister-in-law about to die. The boss reveals to the warden that he was the one who had kidnapped his daughter 20 years ago and now it is the grown up Shalini. They fight with him, the boss gets beaten up, and Kaalia finally chops Shahani's arm off.

== Cast ==
- Amitabh Bachchan as Kallu / Kaalia
- Asha Parekh as Shanti (Kallu's sister-in-law)
- Parveen Babi as Shalini / Rani Singh
- Kader Khan as Shamu (Kallu's brother)
- Amjad Khan as Shahani Seth / Jaswant
- Pran as Jailer Raghuvir Singh (Shalini's estranged father)
- Purnima as Shalini's Stepmother
- K.N. Singh as Convict
- Sajjan as 2nd Defense Attorney
- Murad as IGP Officer
- Sudhir as Rawat
- Baby Khushbu as Rina, Shalini's Stepsister
- Brahmachari as Gopal
- Ram Sethi as Crippled Prisoner
- Brahm Bhardawaj as Judge
- Ranjit Chowdhry as Boot polisher
- Yunus Parvez as Abdul, Factory Mill Worker
- Dev Kumar as Convict
- Hiralal as Convict
- Jagdeep as car dealer
- Bob Christo as Michael
- Gajanan Jagirdar as Kallu's Defence Lawyer
- Raza Murad as Public Prosecutor
- Mushtaq Khan as Ram Deen
- Anjan Srivastav as Constable in Central Jail (Guest Role)

== Soundtrack ==
Lyrics were by Majrooh Sultanpuri.

#	Title	Singer(s)
1	"Jahan Teri Yeh Nazar Hai"	Kishore Kumar
2	"Jab Se Tumko Dekha"	Kishore Kumar, Asha Bhosle
3	"Tum Saath Ho Jab Apne"	Kishore Kumar, Asha Bhosle
4	"Sanam Tum Jahan Mera Dil Wahan"	Asha Bhosle
5	"Dil To Dete Nahi"	Asha Bhosle
6	"Kaun Kisi Ko Baandh Saka"	Mohammed Rafi & Chorus

Amitabh Bachchan has claimed credit for composing the song "Jahan Teri Yeh Nazar Hai." The song "Jahan Teri Yeh Nazar Hai" influenced the song "Palat – Tera Hero Idhar Hai", featured in the 2014 film Main Tera Hero.
