= Raat Bhar =

Song by Arijit Singh and Shreya Ghoshal

- Picture sleeve with actors Tiger Shroff and Kriti Sanon

Song by Arijit Singh and Shreya Ghoshal

from the album Heropanti
- Language: Hindi
- English title: Whole night
- Released: 21 April 2014
- Genre: Pop
- Length: 5:26
- Label: T-Series
- Composer: Sajid–Wajid
- Lyricist: Kausar Munir

Music video
- "Raat Bhar" on YouTube

"Raat Bhar" (transl. Whole night) is a song from the 2014 Hindi film, Heropanti. Composed by Sajid–Wajid, the song is sung by Arijit Singh and Shreya Ghoshal, with lyrics penned by Kausar Munir. The peppy track features Tiger Shroff and Kriti Sanon in the video.

== Development ==
Music for the song is composed and arranged by Sajid–Wajid, where percussion is played by Nitin Shankar and guitar played by Kalyan Barua. The song was recorded at Geet Audio Craft Studio by Abani Tanti and Ashok Honda Studio by Shakeel Ahmed. Abhijit Vaghani programmed the soundtrack where Suzanne D'Mello is credited as a backup vocalist. The video for the song was shot in Karjat for three days and was the last song shot from the movie. Audio for the song was recorded seven months prior to video shoot. The song had no specific choreography.

== Critical reception ==
Aishwarya of Koimoi commented Arijit Singh hits the initial notes with an absolute power over this rendition and though it turns into a fusion later, there is no intoned confusion at all. Kausar Munir, yet again, does a fine job. Shreya Ghoshal complements the male voice in her systemic perfection, as far as playback is concerned. It is also a suitable number for going out clubbing. Rajiv Vijayakar of Bollywood Hungama commented Shreya (Ghoshal) is her usual seasoned self in this duet, and Arijit (Singh) imitates Wajid the way Mohit Chauhan did in the earlier tracks, singing in full-throated manner.

Devesh Sharma of Filmfare commented Arijit Singh's and Shreya Ghoshal's voices make it the pick of the album. Melody is the core strength of Sajid–Wajid and the song reminds you of how good they are when they are playing to their strength. Joginder Tuteja of Rediff.com commented Two of the most in-demand singers, Arijit Singh and Shreya Ghoshal, come together for this winning track from Sajid–Wajid and Kausar Munir. It has a terrific mix of romance, melody and rhythm with a club sound to it.

== Similarities ==
Upon release several reviews were indicating the similarities between "Raat Bhar" and "Mukhtasar" from 2012 released Teri Meri Kahaani, from the same music director, Sajid–Wajid. Critics considering the song as a "sequel of Mukhtasar" reviewed the song as an unusual arrangement for Sajid–Wajid where they overlaid the basic tune of Mukhtasar and filled it with techno sounds.

== Success ==
During the weeks the song released, it secured a place in top 3 India iTunes top 100 songs. The song peaked at number 3 in Mirchi Top 20 Songs and other radio charts.

== Accolades ==
| Year | Award | Category | Nominee | Result | Ref |
|---|---|---|---|---|---|
| 2015 | Star Guild Awards | Best Male Playback Singer | Arijit Singh | Nominated | |
| 2015 | Star Guild Awards | Best Female Playback Singer | Shreya Ghoshal | Nominated | |
