= Heropanti =

2014 Indian film by Sabbir Khan

- Theatrical release poster
- Directed by: Sabbir Khan
- Written by: Sanjeev Dutta
- Based on: Parugu (2008)
- Produced by: Sajid Nadiadwala
- Starring: Tiger Shroff; Kriti Sanon; Prakash Raj
- Cinematography: Hari K. Vedantam
- Edited by: Manan Ajay Sagar
- Music by: Songs: Sajid–Wajid; Manj Musik; Mustafa Zahid; Score: Sandeep Shirodkar
- Production company: Nadiadwala Grandson Entertainment
- Distributed by: UTV Motion Pictures
- Release date: 23 May 2014
- Running time: 146 minutes
- Country: India
- Language: Hindi
- Budget: ₹25 crore
- Box office: est. ₹82 crore

Heropanti (transl. Heroic Antics/Big Attitude) is a 2014 Indian Hindi-language romantic action film directed by Sabbir Khan. Produced by Sajid Nadiadwala. The film features newcomers Tiger Shroff and Kriti Sanon, alongside Prakash Raj in a supporting role. It is a remake of 2008 Telugu film Parugu and was released on 23 May 2014. A sequel titled Heropanti 2 was released in 2022.

== Plot ==
Sooraj Singh Chaudhary is a stern patriarch from a respected Jat family in Haryana. On his elder daughter Renu's wedding night, she elopes with her boyfriend, Rakesh. Determined to retrieve her, Chaudhary mobilizes his men to track down the couple. They capture two of Rakesh's friends and force them to reveal Bablu's name, suspecting he knows the couple's whereabouts. When Chaudhary's brothers Bhuppi, Pappi, and Sukhi confront Bablu, he overpowers them but is eventually subdued. Bablu and his friends are held captive and interrogated but insist they know nothing. Meanwhile, Bablu confides in his friends about his love for a girl whose earring he found but does not know her identity. The group attempts to escape but is recaptured when Bablu is distracted by catching sight of the girl.

Dimpy, Chaudhary's younger daughter and Renu's sister, discovers Renu's love letters. Fearing exposure, Dimpy tries to protect her sister's secret but inadvertently involves Bablu and his friends. Using the letters, Bablu blackmails Dimpy into helping him find the girl he loves. Dimpy reluctantly agrees and later learns that she is the girl Bablu has been searching for when he gives her earring to her, but Dimpy stays silent.

During a trip to town with Chaudhary's men in search of Renu and Rakesh, Bablu helps them flee to Shimla. However, their escape is uncovered by Pappi when he accidentally overhears Dimpy, and Bablu and his friends are severely beaten and Bablu sees Dimpy, which she recognizes him and reveals that Bablu knows where Renu and Rakesh are. Under pressure and getting beaten, Bablu falsely claims the couple is in Delhi. The group, including Dimpy, travels to Delhi, where Dimpy is kidnapped but rescued by Bablu, earning Chaudhary's grudging trust. Dimpy realizes her feelings for Bablu but hesitates to confess. Chaudhary eventually locates Renu and Rakesh on a bus. Defying her father, Renu reveals her pregnancy to Chaudhary, who upon being shocked, spares their lives but disowns Renu. The family returns home, and Chaudhary arranges Dimpy's marriage to Rajjo, a wealthy suitor. Heartbroken, Bablu decides to leave but soon returns, determined to win Dimpy. Chaudhary, fearing another elopement, keeps a close watch on Bablu. Bablu tells him that he understands how Chaudhary felt when Renu ran away from home and promises he will not elope with Dimpy.

When Bablu and his friends are about to leave, Rajjo enters at this juncture and beats up Bablu, however, Bablu fights back and defeats Rajjo when Rajjo insults him and Dimpy. However, they are stopped at the last moment by Chaudhary, who, realizing that Dimpy will only be happy if she gets to be with Bablu, tells Bablu to take Dimpy away. Bablu and Dimpy unite with a hug, Chaudhary and the other Jat community people agree to permit inter-caste and love marriages, and Chaudhary accepts Renu back as his daughter. The movie ends on a happy note.

== Cast ==
- Tiger Shroff as Bablu
- Kriti Sanon as Dimple 'Dimpy' Chaudhary
- Prakash Raj as Sooraj Singh Chaudhary/ Chaudhary Saab
- Sandeepa Dhar as Renuka 'Renu' Chaudhary
- Vikram Singh as Rajjo Fauji
- Shireesh Sharma as Police Commissioner
- Samar Jai Singh as Bhuppi
- K. C. Shankar as Pappi
- Sunil Grover as Driver

== Production ==
Salman Khan asked Sajid Nadiadwala to launch Jackie Shroff's son Tiger Shroff for the film who was signed in June 2012. Filming was mostly done in Kashmir including the romantic song "Rabba". Official trailer was released on 6 April 2014. The film was released on 23 May 2014.

== Music ==
Heropanti

Soundtrack album by Sajid–Wajid, Manj Musik and Mustafa Zahid
- Released: 21 April 2014
- Genre: Feature film soundtrack
- Length: 28:33
- Language: Hindi
- Labels: T-Series; Saregama

Sajid–Wajid chronology
Main Tera Hero (2014)	Heropanti (2014)	Daawat-e-Ishq (2014)

=== Soundtrack ===
The soundtrack was composed by Sajid–Wajid, Manj Musik and Mustafa Zahid. The lyrics were written by Kausar Munir, Raftaar and Mustafa Zahid. Mohit Chauhan, Wajid, Manj Musik, Nindy Kaur, Raftaar, Mustafa Zahid, Shreya Ghoshal and Arijit Singh lent their voices for the soundtrack. The soundtrack was released on 21 April 2014.

The song "Whistle Baja" had its signature tune similar to the hit song "Lambi Judai" originally sung by Reshma for Tiger Shroff's father Jackie Shroff's film Hero.

Track listing
No.	Title	Lyrics	Music	Singer(s)	Length
1.	"Whistle Baja"	Raftaar	Manj Musik & Laxmikant Pyarelal	Manj Musik, Nindy Kaur, Raftaar (rap lyrics)	03:13
2.	"Rabba"	Kausar Munir	Sajid–Wajid	Mohit Chauhan	04:53
3.	"Raat Bhar"	Kausar Munir	Sajid–Wajid	Arijit Singh, Shreya Ghoshal	05:26
4.	"Tabah"	Kausar Munir	Sajid–Wajid	Mohit Chauhan	05:20
5.	"The Pappi Song"	Raftaar	Manj Musik	Seedhe Maut (rap verse), Manj Musik	02:44
6.	"Tere Binaa"	Mustafa Zahid	Mustafa Zahid	Mustafa Zahid	03:23
7.	"Tabah" (Remix)	Kausar Munir	Sajid–Wajid	Mohit Chauhan	03:36
Total length:					28:33

=== Soundtrack reception ===
Joginder Tuteja from Rediff gave 3.5 stars and stated, "With four good songs in a row, Heropanti's music is pretty much a paisa vasool experience already. So, though you may be taken aback by the title of Manj Musik and Raftaar's next offering 'The Pappi Song', you would like to hear it."

== Reception ==
The film received mixed reviews, who appreciated performances of ensemble cast, action sequences performed by Shroff, and cinematography, but criticized for screenplay, pace, and narration.

Film critic Subhash K. Jha gave it 3.5 out of 5 stars and said that Shroff delivers a rare combination of romantic and action oriented protagonist. Bollywood Hungama critic Taran Adarsh also gave the movie 3.5 out of 5 stars, calling it an entertainer that hits the right notes. News18 critic Rajeev Masand gave the film 2 out of 5 stars and stated that "for Heropanti, with its regressive themes, sexist humor, and stock villains wears you out early on during its 2 hours 26-minute running time." Anupama Chopra also gave the movie 2 out of 5 stars and overall criticised the movie by saying, "the disjointed narrative brims with low-IQ high-testosterone men brandishing weapons. The women are puppets who either simper or scream." According to Firstpost critic Mihir Fadnavis, Tiger Shroff can pull off stunts, but that is about it. Faheem Rumani of India Today gave it 1.5 out of 5 stars, stating that, "Heropanti is all about Shroff's athletic ability and has little to do with his acting skills".

== Box office ==
The film grossed approximately ₹82 crore (US$13.44 million) worldwide. At the end of three weeks, Heropanti had collected ₹56 crore (US$9.18 million) nett.

== Awards ==
Year	Award	Category	Nominee	Result
2014	StarDust Awards	StarDust Award for Superstar of Tomorrow – Female	Kriti Sanon	Won
2015	BIG Star Entertainment Awards	BIG Star Most Entertaining Actor – Female	Kriti Sanon	Won
2015	Screen Awards	Most Promising Newcomer – Female	Kriti Sanon	Nominated
2015	Filmfare Awards	Best Female Debut	Kriti Sanon	Won
2015	IIFA Awards	Star Debut of the Year	Kriti Sanon	Won
2015	Star Guild Awards	Best Female Debut	Kriti Sanon	Won
2014	Stardust Awards	Stardust Award for Superstar of Tomorrow - Male	Tiger Shroff	Won
2014	BIG Star Entertainment Awards	BIG Star Most Entertaining Actor – Male	Tiger Shroff	Won
2014	Star Guild Awards	Best Male Debut	Tiger Shroff	Won
2015	IIFA Awards	IIFA Award for Star Debut of the Year – Male	Tiger Shroff	Won
2015	Filmfare Award	Filmfare Award for Best Male Debut	Tiger Shroff	Nominated
2015	Screen Awards	Most Promising Newcomer – Male	Tiger Shroff	Won

== Sequel ==
The sequel, Heropanti 2 was confirmed by Tiger Shroff on 19 February 2020, and the official announcement happened on 28 February with the unveiling of two first look posters presenting its release date as 16 July 2021. In October 2020, makers announced that Tara Sutaria will enact the heroine opposite Shroff and that filming will begin in December 2020. However the filming ended up getting pushed ahead due to COVID-19 pandemic which led to the postponement of release date too. On 2 March 2020, the sequel's third poster, along with a new release date of 3 December 2021, was revealed. Filming of the first schedule finally kicked off in Mumbai in April 2021.
