= Half Girlfriend (soundtrack) =

2017 soundtrack album by various artists

- Soundtrack cover

Soundtrack album by Mithoon, Tanishk Bagchi, Farhan Saeed, Rishi Rich, Rahul Mishra and Ami Mishra
- Released: 28 April 2017
- Genre: Feature film soundtrack
- Length: 1:00:46
- Language: Hindi
- Label: Zee Music Company
- Producers: Subhash Chandra; Ekta Kapoor

Tanishk Bagchi chronology
Machine (2017)	Half Girlfriend (2017)	Munna Michael (2017)

Mithoon chronology
Wajah Tum Ho (2016)	Half Girlfriend (2017)	Aksar 2 (2017)

Farhan Saeed chronology
Creature 3D (2014)	Half Girlfriend' (2017)

Rishi Rich chronology
Jackpot (2013)	Half Girlfriend' (2017)

Half Girlfriend is the soundtrack to the 2017 Hindi romance film of the same name, directed by Mohit Suri and starring Arjun Kapoor and Shraddha Kapoor in lead roles. The album was produced by Subhash Chandra and Ekta Kapoor under the banner of Zee Music Company and Balaji Motion Pictures.

The soundtrack is composed by Tanishk Bagchi ("Baarish"), Mithoon ("Phir Bhi Tumko Chaahunga"), Farhan Saeed ("Thodi Der" and "Stay a Little Longer"), Rahul Mishra ("Tu Hi Hai"), and Ami Mishra ("Lost Without You", "Manzoor Hai").

== Track listing ==
The film score is composed by Raju Singh, who has composed for all of Mohit Suri's previous films. The songs featured in the film are composed by Mithoon, Tanishk Bagchi, Rishi Rich, Farhan Saeed, Ami Mishra, and Rahul Mishra, while the lyrics are written by Manoj Muntashir, Arafat Mehmood, Tanishk Bagchi, Laado Suwalka, Anushka Shahaney, R. Rekhi, Veronica Mehta, Yash Anand, Yash Narvekar, and Ishita Moitra Udhwani.

The album, which includes 13 songs, was released on 28 April 2017 by Zee Music Company. Other songs were not included on the album but were released after the release of the film. The album includes a duet by Shreya Ghoshal and Farhan Saeed: "Thodi Der", which is the recreated version of Saeed's single of the same name.

Track listing
No.	Title	Lyrics	Music	Singer(s)	Length
1.	"Baarish"	Arafat Mehmood, Tanishk Bagchi	Tanishk Bagchi	Ash King, Shashaa Tirupati	4:36
2.	"Thodi Der"	Kumaar	Farhan Saeed	Farhan Saeed, Shreya Ghoshal	4:56
3.	"Tu Hi Hai"	Laado Suwalka	Rahul Mishra	Rahul Mishra	5:22
4.	"Phir Bhi Tumko Chaahunga"	Manoj Muntashir	Mithoon	Arijit Singh, Shashaa Tirupati	5:51
5.	"Pal Bhar" (Chaahunga Reprise)	Manoj Muntashir	Mithoon	Arijit Singh	4:34
6.	"Lost Without You"	Kunaal Verma, Anushka Shahaney	Ami Mishra	Ami Mishra, Anushka Shahaney	5:36
7.	"Stay a Little Longer"	Anushka Shahaney, Ishita Moitra Udhwani	Farhan Saeed	Anushka Shahaney	5:02
8.	"Mere Dil Mein"	R. Rekhi, Veronica Mehta, Yash Anand, Yash Narvekar, Ishita Moitra	Rishi Rich	Veronica Mehta, Yash Narvekar	3:08
9.	"Half Girlfriend" (Half Girlfriend - Love Theme)		Mithoon		4:32
10.	"Mere Dil Mein" (Dialogue Version)	R. Rekhi, Veronica Mehta, Yash Anand, Yash Narvekar, Ishita Moitra	Rishi Rich	Veronica Mehta, Yash Narvekar	2:44
11.	"Phir Bhi Tumko Chaahungi – Female"	Manoj Muntashir	Mithoon	Shraddha Kapoor	3:50
12.	"Manzoor Hai" (T SERIES Zee Music Special)	Kunaal Verma	Ami Mishra	Ami Mishra	5:00
13.	"Baarish" (Atif Aslam Version)	Arafat Mehmood, Tanishk Bagchi	Tanishk Bagchi	Atif Aslam	5:36
Total length:					1:00:46

== Awards and nominations ==
Date of Ceremony	Award	Category	Recipient	Work	Result	Ref.
30 December 2017	Zee Cine Awards	Song of the Year	Tanishk Bagchi	"Baarish"	Won	
30 December 2017	Zee Cine Awards	Best Playback Singer (Male)	Ash King	"Baarish"	Nominated	
30 December 2017	Zee Cine Awards	Best Playback Singer (Male)	Arijit Singh	"Phir Bhi Tumko Chaahunga"	Nominated	
30 December 2017	Zee Cine Awards	Best Lyricist	Manoj Muntashir	"Phir Bhi Tumko Chaahunga"	Nominated	
30 December 2017	Zee Cine Awards	Best Playback Singer (Female)	Shreya Ghoshal	"Thodi Der"	Nominated	
30 December 2017	Zee Cine Awards	Best Music Director	Farhan Saeed	"Thodi Der"	Nominated	
30 December 2017	Zee Cine Awards	Best Music Director	Mithoon	"Phir Bhi Tumko Chaahunga"	Nominated	
3 December 2017	Star Screen Awards	Best Background Music	Mithoon	"The Love Theme"	Nominated	
20 January 2018	Filmfare Awards	Best Music Album	Various	Music Album	Nominated	
20 January 2018	Filmfare Awards	Best Male Playback Singer	Ash King	"Baarish"	Nominated	
20 January 2018	Filmfare Awards	Best Female Playback Singer	Shreya Ghoshal	"Thodi Der"	Nominated	
28 January 2018	Mirchi Music Awards	Female Vocalist of The Year	Shreya Ghoshal	"Thodi Der"	Won	
28 January 2018	Mirchi Music Awards	Listener's Choice Song of the Year	Mithoon	"Phir Bhi Tumko Chaahunga"	Won	
28 January 2018	Mirchi Music Awards	Male Vocalist of The Year	Arijit Singh	"Phir Bhi Tumko Chaahunga"	Nominated	
28 January 2018	Mirchi Music Awards	Male Vocalist of The Year	Ash King	"Baarish"	Nominated	
28 January 2018	Mirchi Music Awards	Song of The Year	Tanishk Bagchi	"Baarish"	Nominated	
28 January 2018	Mirchi Music Awards	Lyricist of The Year	Tanishk Bagchi	"Baarish"	Nominated	
28 January 2018	Mirchi Music Awards	Music Composer of The Year	Tanishk Bagchi	"Baarish"	Nominated	
28 January 2018	Mirchi Music Awards	Music Composer of The Year	Mithoon	"Phir Bhi Tumko Chaahunga"	Nominated	
28 January 2018	Mirchi Music Awards	Upcoming Female Vocalist of The Year	Anushka Shahaney	"Stay a Little Longer"	Nominated	
3 March 2018	Bollywood Journalist Awards	Best Supporting Actor (Male)	Vikrant Massey		Nominated	
3 March 2018	Bollywood Journalist Awards	Best Music Direction	Mithoon	"Phir Bhi Tumko Chaahunga"	Nominated	
2 May 2018	Mix Music Awards	Best Song	Tanishk Bagchi	"Baarish"	Won	
2 May 2018	Mix Music Awards	Best Playback Singer (Male)	Ash King	"Baarish"	Nominated	
2 May 2018	Mix Music Awards	Best Playback Singer (Male)	Arijit Singh	"Phir Bhi Tumko Chaahunga"	Nominated	
2 May 2018	Mix Music Awards	Best Lyricist	Manoj Muntashir	"Phir Bhi Tumko Chaahunga"	Won	
2 May 2018	Mix Music Awards	Best Playback Singer (Female)	Shreya Ghoshal	"Thodi Der"	Won	
TBA	Gaana Users Choice Awards	Best Music Composer	Tanishk Bagchi	"Baarish"	Pending	
TBA	Gaana Users Choice Awards	Best Music Composer	Mithoon	"Phir Bhi Tumko Chaahunga"	Pending	
TBA	Gaana Users Choice Awards	Best Playback Singer (Male)	Arijit Singh	"Phir Bhi Tumko Chaahunga"	Pending	
TBA	Gaana Users Choice Awards	Best Playback Singer (Male)	Ash King	"Baarish"	Pending	
TBA	Gaana Users Choice Awards	Best Album	Various		Pending	

== Additionals ==
Track listing
No.	Title	Lyrics	Music	Singer(s)	Length
1.	"Baarish" (Atif Aslam version)	Arafat Mehmood, Tanishk Bagchi	Tanishk Bagchi	Atif Aslam	4:34
2.	"Baarish" (Asees Kaur version)	Arafat Mehmood, Tanishk Bagchi	Tanishk Bagchi	Asees Kaur	2:20
3.	"Tu Hi Hai" (Jyotica Tangri version)	Laado Suwalka	Rahul Mishra	Jyotica Tangri	3:00
4.	"Phir Bhi Tumko Chaahungi" (Jyotica Tangri version)	Manoj Muntashir	Mithoon	Jyotica Tangri	3:28
5.	"Phir Bhi Tumko Chaahungi" (Akansha Sharma version)	Manoj Muntashir	Mithoon	Akansha Sharma	3:10
6.	"Lost Without You" (Rahul Sathu version)	Kunaal Verma, Anushka Shahaney	Ami Mishra	Rahul Sathu, Jonita Gandhi	2:45
7.	"Manzoor Hai" (Lost Without You (Reprise))	Kunaal Verma, Anushka Shahaney	Ami Mishra	Ami Mishra	4:44
Total length:					1:00:46
