= Kunaal Vermaa =

Indian lyricist

- Born: Sri Madhopur, Rajasthan, India
- Occupations: Lyricist, Poet
- Spouse: Kavita Sharma

Kunaal Vermaa is an Indian lyricist and poet from Sri Madhopur, Sikar district, Rajasthan, India. His debut song as a lyricist was Hasi from the movie Hamari Adhuri Kahani composed by Ami Mishra.

== Discography ==
=== Films songs ===
Year	Title	Movie	Record label	Composer	Singer(s)	Note
2015	Hasi	Hamari Adhuri Kahani	Sony Music India	Ami Mishra	Ami Mishra	
2015	"Hasi (Female)"	Hamari Adhuri Kahani	Sony Music India	Ami Mishra	Shreya Ghoshal	
2016	"Gumnam Hai Koi"	1920 London	Saregama	JAM8	Jubin Nautiyal, Antara Mitra	Remake
2017	"Lost Without You"	Half Girlfriend	Zee Music Company	Ami Mishra	Anushka Shahaney, Ami Mishra	Co-lyricist Anushka Sahaney
2017	"Manzoor Hai (Lost Without You Reprise)"	Half Girlfriend	Zee Music Company	Ami Mishra	Ami Mishra	
2017	"Main Hoon Saath Tere"	Shaadi Mein Zaroor Aana	Zee Music Company	JAM8	Arijit Singh	co-lyricist Shakeel Azmi
2017	"Main Hoon Saath Tere (Female)"	Shaadi Mein Zaroor Aana	Zee Music Company	JAM8	Shivangi Bhanaya	co-lyricist Shakeel Azmi
2018	Mummy Kasam	Nawabzaade	T-Series	Gurinder Seagal	Gurinder Seagal, Payal Dev, Ikka	co-lyricist Gurinder Seagal
2018	Pal	Jalebi	Sony Music India	Javed-Mohsin	Arijit Singh, Shreya Ghoshal	co-lyricist Prashant Ingole
2018	"Pal (Female)"	Jalebi	Sony Music India	Javed-Mohsin	Shreya Ghoshal	co-lyricist Prashant Ingole
2018	Saansain Hui Dhuan Dhuan	Race 3	Tips Industries	Gurinder Seagal	Gurinder Seagal, Payal Dev, Lulia Vantur	co-lyricist Rimi Nique
2018	Mera Wala Dance	Simmba	T-Series	Lijo George-DJ Chetas	Nakash Aziz, Neha Kakkar	
2019	"Phir Mulaqat"	Why Cheat India	T-Series	Kunaal-Rangon	Jubin Nautiyal	Also as a composer
2019	Tu Laung Main Elaachi	Luka Chuppi	T-Series	Tanishk Bagchi	Tulsi Kumar	Remake
2019	Duniyaa	Luka Chuppi	T-Series	Abhijit Vaghani	Akhil, Dhvani Bhanushali	Remake
2019	Tu Mila To Haina	De De Pyaar De	T-Series	Amaal Mallik	Arijit Singh	
2019	Chale Aana	De De Pyaar De	T-Series	Amaal Mallik	Armaan Malik	
2019	"Tum Hi Aana"	Marjaavaan	T-Series	Payal Dev	Jubin Nautiyal	
2019	"Tum Hi Aana (Happy)"	Marjaavaan	T-Series	Payal Dev	Jubin Nautiyal	
2019	"Tum Hi Aana (Sad)"	Marjaavaan	T-Series	Payal Dev	Jubin Nautiyal	
2019	"Tum Hi Aana (Duet)"	Marjaavaan	T-Series	Payal Dev	Jubin Nautiyal, Dhvani Bhanushali	
2020	Pind	Street Dancer 3D	T-Series	Gurinder Seagal		
2020	Malang - Title Track	Malang	T-Series	Ved Sharma	Ved Sharma	co-lyricist Haarsh Limbachiyaa
2020	"Malang - Female Version"	Malang	T-Series	Ved Sharma	Asees Kaur	co-lyricist Haarsh Limbachiyaa
2020	"Humraah"	Malang	T-Series	The Fusion Project	Sachet Tandon	
2020	"LOL"	Ginny Weds Sunny	Sony Music India	Payal Dev	Payal Dev, Dev Negi	Netflix film
2020	"Phir Chala"	Ginny Weds Sunny	Sony Music India	Payal Dev	Jubin Nautiyal	Netflix film
2020	"Ummeed Hai"	Unpaused	Sony Music India	Payal Dev	Jubin Nautiyal	Amazon Prime Video anthology film
2020	"Waareya (Male Version)"	Suraj Pe Mangal Bhari	Zee Music Company	Javed-Mohsin	Vibhor Parashar	
2020	"Waareya (Duet)"	Suraj Pe Mangal Bhari	Zee Music Company	Javed-Mohsin	Vibhor Parashar, Palak Muchhal	
2021	Main Hoon Na Saath Tere	Saina	T-Series	Amaal Mallik	Armaan Malik	
2021	Zoom Zoom	Radhe: Your Most Wanted Bhai	Zee Music Co.	Sajid	Ash King, Iulia Vantur	Zee5 film
2021	Baby Tu Na Ja	Time to Dance	T-Series	Gurinder Seagal	Gurinder Seagal, Jonita Gandhi	
2021	Aur Is Dil Mein	Kya Meri Sonam Gupta Bewafa Hai?	Zee Music Company	Rahul Mishra		Zee5 film
2021	Jug Jug Jiyo	Kaagaz	Zee Music Company	Rahul Jain		Along with Aseem Ahmed Abbasee; Zee5 film
2021	Jug Jug Jiyo (Reprise)	Kaagaz	Zee Music Company	Rahul Jain		Along with Aseem Ahmed Abbasee; Zee5 film
2021	"Tera Hua"	Cash	Sony Music India	Akull	Arijit Singh	Disney Plus Hotstar film
2022	"Zindagi"	Ardh	Zee Music Company	Palash Muchhal	Sonu Nigam	Zee5 film
2022	"Zindagi (Reprise)"	Ardh	Zee Music Company	Palash Muchhal	Rekha Bhardwaj	Zee5 film
2022	"Dil"	Ek Villain Returns	T-Series	Kaushik-Guddu	Raghav Chaitanya	
2022	"Dil (Female)"	Ek Villain Returns	T-Series	Kaushik-Guddu	Shreya Ghoshal	
2022	"Mera Banega Tu"	Liger	Sony Music India	Tanishk Bagchi	Lakshay Kapoor	
2022	"Ajnabee Ban Gaye"	Saroj Ka Rishta	Zee Music Company	Rahul Jain	Armaan Malik	
2023	"Teri Meri Baatein"	Chengiz	Grassroot Entertainment	Kaushik-Guddu	Sanjith Hegde	Hindi Dub Version
2024	"Tere Sang Ishq Hua"	Yodha	T-Series	Tanishk Bagchi	Arijit Singh, Neeti Mohan	
2024	"Jaazbati Hai Dil"	Do Aur Do Pyaar	Panorama Music	Lost Stories (DJs)	Armaan Malik, Ananya Birla	
2024	"Jeena Sikha De"	Srikanth	T-Series	Ved Sharma	Arijit Singh	
2024	"Jeena Sikha De (Reprise)"	Srikanth	T-Series	Ved Sharma	Ved Sharma	
2024	"Zaroorat Se Zyada"	Vedaa	Zee Music Company	Amaal Mallik	Arijit Singh	
2024	"Zaroorat Se Zyada (Female)"	Vedaa	Zee Music Company	Amaal Mallik	Shreya Ghoshal	
2024	"Zaroorat Se Zyada (Duet)"	Vedaa	Zee Music Company	Amaal Mallik	Arijit Singh, Shreya Ghoshal	
2024	"Yaad Reh Jaati Hai"	The Buckingham Murders	Tips Music	Payal Dev	B Praak	
2025	"Teri Pehli Nazar"	Love in Vietnam	DRJ Records	Devv Sadaana	Raghav Chaitanya	
2025	"Deewaniyat- Title Track"	Ek Deewane Ki Deewaniyat	Play DMF	Kaushik-Guddu	Vishal Mishra	
2025	"Khoobsurat"	Ek Deewane Ki Deewaniyat	Play DMF	Kunaal Vermaa	Jubin Nautiyal	Debut as a composer
2025	"Deewaniyat" (Unplugged)	Ek Deewane Ki Deewaniyat	Play DMF	Kunaal Vermaa	Vishal Mishra	

=== Singles ===
Year	Title	Language	Record label	Composer	Singer(s)	Note
2021	Romantic Raja	Hindi	Blue Beat Studios	Shipra Goyal	Khesari Lal Yadav Shipra Goyal	
2022	Meri Tarah	Hindi	T Series	Payal Dev	Jubin Nautiyal Payal Dev	
2022	Baha Le Jaa	Hindi	Saregama	Arjun Kanungo	Arjun Kanungo	
2022	Siri Ban Jaauli	Rajasthani	Meri Tune Rajasthani	Himself	Chitralekha Sen Kavira	
2022	Yaar Ki Mehfil	Hindi	White Hill Beats	Himself	Stebin Ben	
2022	Kuch Baatein	Hindi	T Series	Payal Dev	Jubin Nautiyal Payal Dev	
2022	Jaa Rahe Ho	Hindi	Saregama	Himself	Yasser Desai	
2022	Subah Se Shaam	Hindi	Meri Tune	Himself	Shipra Goyal Madhur Sharma	
2022	Tujhe Chaahta Hoon Kyun	Hindi	MWM Entertainment	Amaal Mallik	Amaal Mallik	
2022	Kitne Jhoothe	Hindi	Meri Tune	Himself Gold Boy	Himself Abhisek Akshara Singh	
2023	Do Tukde	Hindi	Meri Tune	Himself	Babbu Maan	
2023	Pyaar Hona Na Tha	Hindi	T Series	Payal Dev	Payal Dev Jubin Nautiyal	
2023	Bhari Mehfil 2.0	Hindi	Meri Tune	Patralikaa B	Shipra Goyal	
2023	Liya Jo Meine Tera Naam	Hindi	Meri Tune	Himself	Abhishek	
2023	Piya Tum Bin	Hindi	Kutle Khan Project	Kutle Khan Komorebi	Kutle Khan	
2023	Chale Jaana Phir	Hindi	For The Record Music	Denny Richard Cruze Brunton	Rahul Mishra	
2023	Kam Toh Nahi	Hindi	T Series	Payal Dev	Payal Dev	
2023	Sanam Aa Gaya	Hindi	DRJ Records	Payal Dev	Payal Dev Stebin Ben	
2024	Milenge Hum Nahi	Hindi	Meri Tune	Himself	Himself	
2024	Tera Main Intezaar	Hindi	T Series	Amaal Mallik	Armaan Malik	
2025	Kyun Mujhse Door Tha	Hindi	MWM Entertainment	Amaal Mallik	Amaal Mallik	
2026	Yahin Guzaar Doon	Hindi	MWM Entertainment	Amaal Mallik	Amaal Mallik Shreya Ghoshal	

== Awards and nominations ==
Year	Awards	Category	Nominated for	Result	Ref
2016	Mirchi Music Awards	Best Upcoming Lyricist of the year	Hamari Adhuri Kahani	Nominated	
