= 10th Mirchi Music Awards =

Annual Hindi music award ceremony held in 2018

- Sponsored by: Royal Stag
- Date: January 28, 2018
- Location: Dome@NSCI, Mumbai
- Country: India
- Presented by: Radio Mirchi
- Hosted by: Sonu Nigam

Highlights
- Most awards: Jab Harry Met Sejal (5)
- Most nominations: Jab Harry Met Sejal (9)
- Song of the Year: "Hawayein" – Jab Harry Met Sejal
- Album of the Year: Jab Harry Met Sejal

Television/radio coverage
- Network: Zee TV

The 10th Mirchi Music Awards, presented by the Radio Mirchi, honoured the best music professionals of Hindi language Indian films of 2017. The ceremony was held on 28 January 2018 at the Dome @ National Sports Club of India, Mumbai and was hosted by Sonu Nigam. There were many performances, including those by Shreya Ghoshal, Ayushmann Khurrana, Javed Ali, Harshdeep Kaur and Neha Bhasin. A musical tribute was given to A. R. Rahman for completing his 25 years in the Indian cinema. Jab Harry Met Sejal won a leading five awards including Album of the Year and Song of the Year for "Hawayein". The show was broadcast on 18 March 2018 on Zee TV.

== Winners and nominees ==
The winners were selected by the members of jury, chaired by Kavita Krishnamurthy. The following are the names of nominees and winners.

(Winners are listed first, highlighted in boldface.)

=== Film awards ===
Song of the Year	Album of the Year
**"Hawayein"** – **Jab Harry Met Sejal**; "Aashiq Surrender Hua" – Badrinath Ki Dulhania; "Roke Na Ruke Naina" – Badrinath Ki Dulhania; "Baarish" – Half Girlfriend; "Maana Ke Hum Yaar Nahin" – Meri Pyaari Bindu	**"Jab Harry Met Sejal"** – **Pritam, Irshad Kamil**; "Jagga Jasoos" – Pritam, Amitabh Bhattacharya, Neelesh Misra; "Raabta" – Pritam, JAM8, Irshad Kamil, Amitabh Bhattacharya, Kumaar; "Secret Superstar" – Amit Trivedi, Kausar Munir; "Tiger Zinda Hai" – Vishal–Shekhar, Irshad Kamil
Male Vocalist of the Year	Female Vocalist of the Year
**Arijit Singh – "Hawayein"** from **Jab Harry Met Sejal**; Arijit Singh – "Roke Na Ruke Naina" from Badrinath Ki Dulhania; Arijit Singh – "Phir Bhi Tumko Chaahunga" from Half Girlfriend; Ash King – "Baarish" from Half Girlfriend; Rahat Fateh Ali Khan – "Mere Rashke Qamar" from Baadshaho	**Shreya Ghoshal – "Thodi Der"** from **Half Girlfriend**; Madhushree – "Soja Zara" from Baahubali 2: The Conclusion; Monali Thakur and Neha Kakkar – "Badri Ki Dulhania" from Badrinath Ki Dulhania; Nikhita Gandhi – "Ghar" from Jab Harry Met Sejal; Samira Koppikar – "Bairaagi" from Bareilly Ki Barfi
Music Composer of the Year	Lyricist of the Year
**Pritam – "Hawayein"** from **Jab Harry Met Sejal**; Amaal Mallik – "Aashiq Surrender Hua" from Badrinath Ki Dulhania; Mithoon – "Phir Bhi Tumko Chaahunga" from Half Girlfriend; Sachin–Jigar – "Hoor" from Hindi Medium; Sachin–Jigar – "Maana Ke Hum Yaar Nahin (Duet)" from Meri Pyaari Bindu; Tanishk Bagchi – "Baarish" from Half Girlfriend	**Irshad Kamil – "Hawayein"** from **Jab Harry Met Sejal**; Anvita Dutt – "Sahiba" from Phillauri; Arafat Mehmood and Tanishk Bagchi – "Baarish" from Half Girlfriend; Irshad Kamil – "Safar" from Jab Harry Met Sejal; Kausar Munir – "Maana Ke Hum Yaar Nahin (Duet)" from Meri Pyaari Bindu; Kumaar – "Pyar Ho" from Munna Michael
Upcoming Male Vocalist of the Year	Upcoming Female Vocalist of the Year
**Asit Tripathy – "Tu Banja Gali Benaras Ki"** from **Shaadi Mein Zaroor Aana**; Kaala Bhairava – "Shivam" from Baahubali 2: The Conclusion; Master Armaan Hasan – "Kankad" from Shubh Mangal Saavdhan; Sudeep Jaipurwale – "Be Nazaara" from Mom; Tushar Joshi – "Musafir" from Jagga Jasoos	**Meghna Mishra – "Main Kaun Hoon"** from **Secret Superstar**; Anushka Shahaney – "Stay a Little Longer" from Half Girlfriend; Meghna Mishra – "Meri Pyaari Ammi" from Secret Superstar; Meghna Mishra – "Nachdi Phira" from Secret Superstar; Mehak Ali – "Baab-E-Rehmat" from Sheitaan; Parineeti Chopra – "Maana Ke Hum Yaar Nahin" from Meri Pyaari Bindu; Rajnigandha Shekhawat – "Kankad" from Shubh Mangal Saavdhan
Upcoming Music Composer of The Year	Upcoming Lyricist of The Year
**JAM8 – "Zaalima"** from **Raees**; Shashwat Sachdev – "Bajaake Tumba" from Phillauri; Shashwat Sachdev – "Sahiba" from Phillauri; Troy Arif – "Meherbaan" from Thodi Thodi Si Manmaaniyan; Vickey Prasad – "Hans Mat Pagli" from Toilet: Ek Prem Katha; Vishal Mishra – "Pyar Ho" from Munna Michael; Vishal Mishra – "Jaane De" from Qarib Qarib Singlle	**Santanu Ghatak – "Rafu"** from **Tumhari Sulu**; Adheesh Verma – "Meer-E-Kaarwan" from Lucknow Central; Kumar Vijay – "Sawan Ban Aay Gayo Badra" from JD; Raghav Dutt – "Meherbaan" from Thodi Thodi Si Manmaaniyan; Sidhant Mago – "Khidki" from Rukh; Sumant Vadhera – "Pal" from Monsoon Shootout
Raag-Inspired Song of the Year
**"Sunn Bhavara"** – **Ok Jaanu**; "Sajna Sohne Jiha" – Firangi; "Saajan Aayo Re" – Ok Jaanu; "Poori Qaaynaat" – Poorna; "Rafu" – Tumhari Sulu

=== Technical awards ===
Best Song Producer (Programming & Arranging)	Best Song Engineer (Recording & Mixing)
**Clinton Cerejo and Hitesh Sonik – "Julia"** from **Rangoon**; Tanuj Tiku, Dj Phukan and Sunny M.R. – "Ghar" from Jab Harry Met Sejal; Sunny M.R. and Dj Phukan – "Ullu Ka Pattha" from Jagga Jasoos; Sachin–Jigar – "Haareya" from Meri Pyaari Bindu; Sourav Roy, Prasad Sashte, Dj Phukan and Sunny M.R. – "Radio(Film Version)" from Tubelight	**Praveen Murlidhar, Bhaskar Sharma and Chakir Hussain – "Darmiyan"** from **Darmiyan (Single)**; Eric Pillai, Shantanu Hudlikar, Abhishek Khandelwal and Manasi Tare – "Roke Na Ruke Naina" from Badrinath Ki Dulhania; Badshah and Aditya Dev – "Mercy" from O.N.E (Album); Shadab Rayeen, Shashwat Sachdev, Neeraj Singh, Julian Mascarenhas, Kotzmann Jan and Katzmann Cenda – "Naughty Billo" from Phillauri; Shadab Rayeen, Ashwin Kulkarni, Himanshu Shirlekar and Aaroh Velankar – "Radio (Film Version)" from Tubelight
Best Background Score
**Vishal Bhardwaj – Rangoon**; Hitesh Sonik – Jab Harry Met Sejal; Pritam – Jagga Jasoos; Sameer Uddin – Bareilly Ki Barfi; Sameer Uddin – Phillauri

=== Non-film awards ===
Indie Pop Song of the Year
- **"Man Marziyan"** sung by **Neeti Mohan**
  - "Rangreziya" sung by Javed Ali
  - "Kamli" sung by Nooran Sisters
  - "Bas Ek Baar" sung by Soham Naik
  - "Ankahee" sung by Sona Mohapatra

=== Special awards ===
Lifetime Achievement Award	Bappi Lahiri
Royal Stag Make It Large Award	Ayushmann Khurrana

=== Listeners' Choice awards ===
Listeners' Choice Song of the Year	"Phir Bhi Tumko Chaahunga" – Half Girlfriend
Listeners' Choice Album of the Year	Jagga Jasoos

=== Jury awards ===
Outstanding Contribution to Hindi Film Music	Gorakh Sharma
Best Album of Golden Era (1957)	Pyaasa
Special Recognition	Ameen Sayani

=== Films with multiple wins and nominations ===
Films that received multiple nominations
Nominations	Film
9	Jab Harry Met Sejal
8	Half Girlfriend
6	Badrinath Ki Dulhania
5	Meri Pyaari Bindu
5	Phillauri
4	Jagga Jasoos
4	Secret Superstar
2	Baahubali 2: The Conclusion
2	Bareilly Ki Barfi
2	Munna Michael
2	Ok Jaanu
2	Rangoon
2	Shubh Mangal Saavdhan
2	Thodi Thodi Si Manmaaniyan
2	Tubelight
2	Tumhari Sulu

Films that received multiple awards
Wins	Film
5	Jab Harry Met Sejal
2	Half Girlfriend‡
2	Rangoon

‡ Won a Listeners' Choice award

== Jury ==
The jury was chaired by Kavita Krishnamurthy. Other members were:

- Alka Yagnik – playback singer
- Milind Srivastava – music director
- Anu Malik – music director
- Ashutosh Gowariker – director, writer and producer
- Hariharan – singer
- Ila Arun – actress and folk singer
- Irshad Kamil – lyricist
- Lalit Pandit – composer
- Louis Banks – composer, record producer and singer
- Madhur Bhandarkar – director, writer and producer
- Pankaj Udhas – singer
- Prasoon Joshi – lyricist and screenwriter
- Pritam – music director and composer
- Ramesh Sippy – director and producer
- Roop Kumar Rathod – playback singer and music director
- Sadhana Sargam – playback singer
- Sulemaan – composer
- Sameer – lyricist
- Sapna Mukherjee – playback singer
- Shaan – playback singer
- Shailendra Singh – playback singer
- Shankar Mahadevan – composer and playback singer
- Subhash Ghai – director, producer and screenwriter
- Sudhir Mishra – director and screenwriter
- Suresh Wadkar – playback singer
- Talat Aziz – singer

== See also ==
- Mirchi Music Awards
