= Half Girlfriend (disambiguation) =

Half Girlfriend is a 2014 Hindi novel by Chetan Bhagat.

Half Girlfriend may refer to:

- Half Girlfriend (film), a 2017 film adaptation of the novel
- Half Girlfriend (soundtrack), a 2017 soundtrack album of the film
