= Something in Common (disambiguation) =

"Something in Common" is a song by singers Bobby Brown and Whitney Houston that was featured on Brown's 1992 album Bobby.

'Something in Common may also refer to:

- Something in Common (Sam Jones album), 1977
- Something in Common (Houston Person and Ron Carter album), 1989
- "Something in Common", a song by Indian singer-songwriter Anushka Shahaney
