= Stay a Little Longer (disambiguation) =

"Stay a Little Longer" is a song by Bob Wills and His Texas Playboys, released in 1946.

Stay a Little Longer may also refer to:

- "Stay a Little Longer" (Brothers Osborne song), 2015
- "Stay a Little Longer", a 2024 song by Rosé from the album Rosie
- "Stay a Little Longer" or "Stay a Little Longer with Me", a 2017 song by Anushka Shahaney from the Indian film Half Girlfriend
- "Stay a Little Longer", a 2014 episode of the television series Parenthood
