= Best Song =

There are numerous awards for a best song, including:

- Academy Award for Best Original Song
- Broadcast Film Critics Association Award for Best Song
- Golden Globe Award for Best Original Song
- Grammy Award for Best Rock Song
- Grammy Award for Best Song Written for Visual Media
- Grammy Award for Best Country Song
- Grammy Award for Best R&B Song
- MTV Europe Music Award for Best Song
- Zee Cine Award for Best Track of the Year
