= Hear Me =

Hear Me may refer to:

- Hear Me (film), a 2009 Taiwanese film
- "Hear Me" (song), a song by Imagine Dragons
- Hear Me (EP), an EP by Imagine Dragons
- "Hear Me", a song by (G)I-dle from I Am
- "Hear Me", a song by Jeannie Ortega from No Place Like BKLYN
- "Hear Me", a song by Kelly Clarkson from Breakaway
- "Hear Me", a song by Indian singer-songwriter Anushka Shahaney
