= Hamari Adhuri Kahani =

2015 Indian film by Mohit Suri

- Theatrical release poster
- Directed by: Mohit Suri
- Screenplay by: Mahesh Bhatt
- Dialogues by: Shagufta Rafiq
- Story by: Mahesh Bhatt
- Produced by: Mahesh Bhatt; Mukesh Bhatt
- Starring: Emraan Hashmi; Vidya Balan; Rajkummar Rao; Madhurima Tuli
- Cinematography: Vishnu Rao
- Edited by: Devendra Murdeshwar
- Music by: Songs: Mithoon; Jeet Gannguli; Ami Mishra; Zubeen Garg; Background Score: Raju Singh
- Production company: Vishesh Films
- Distributed by: Fox Star Studios
- Release date: 12 June 2015
- Running time: 129 minutes
- Country: India
- Language: Hindi
- Budget: ₹400 million
- Box office: est. ₹518.7 million

Hamari Adhuri Kahani (transl. 'Our incomplete story') is a 2015 Indian Hindi-language musical romantic drama film directed by Mohit Suri and produced by Mahesh Bhatt under the banners of Vishesh Films and Fox Star Studios. The film stars Emraan Hashmi, Vidya Balan and Rajkummar Rao in lead roles. The film is inspired by the real-life love story of Bhatt's parents, Nanabhai Bhatt, Shirin Mohammad Ali, and his stepmother, Hemlata Bhatt. Critics compared elements of the plot to that of The Bridges of Madison County (1995).

Hamari Adhuri Kahani was released on 12 June 2015 and garnered mixed-to-positive reviews from critics, with praise for the music and performances of the cast, but criticism for its narrative and pacing. The film did not perform well commercially at the box-office, grossing only ₹518 million globally against a production budget of ₹400 million (US$5.46 million).

== Plot ==
The film opens with Vasudha stepping off a bus, while an elderly man named Hari seeks help from a psychiatrist because of hallucinations involving his wife. His daughter-in-law, Avni, accompanies him to his wife's funeral, where he secretly takes her ashes and leaves a diary for his son, Saanjh.

The narrative then shifts to the past. Vasudha is a single mother waiting for her husband, Hari, who has been missing for five years; she remains loyal to him in accordance with tradition. Vasudha works as a floral arranger in one of Aarav's hotels. During a mock fire drill, she saves Aarav's life, and he offers her a job at his hotel in Dubai, which she initially declines. After the police inform her that Hari has murdered five American journalists and is alleged to be part of a terrorist group, she fears for her son's future and accepts Aarav's offer.

Despite learning about her past, Aarav falls in love with Vasudha. He relates the story of his mother, a cabaret singer who raised him as a single parent and who once fell in love with a man who attempted suicide because of their poverty. Vasudha initially rejects Aarav's advances, citing her loyalty to her missing husband, but after meeting Aarav's mother she comes to accept his love.

Hari suddenly reappears; Vasudha tells him about Aarav, and an enraged Hari leaves. He is soon arrested as a wanted criminal. Vasudha begs Aarav to help prove Hari's innocence, but when Aarav attempts to bribe the home minister, it is revealed that Hari has confessed to the killings himself. Vasudha interprets Hari's confession as a sacrifice so that she and Aarav may be together. Aarav later discovers that Hari's confession was a deliberate act intended to burden Vasudha with guilt and make her believe he had sacrificed himself for her happiness.

Determined to lift Vasudha's guilt, Aarav travels to Bastar, where Hari is accused of the crimes, to establish Hari's innocence. From Father Dayal, Aarav learns that Hari is in fact innocent. While returning to Mumbai, Aarav follows the scent of flowers that remind him of his first meeting with Vasudha. In the jungle he inadvertently steps on a landmine; realizing the danger, he smiles and accepts his fate. Vasudha receives news of his death and leaves Hari, who had been searching for her for two years. She confronts him, reveals that she knows the truth about his false sacrifice, and declares that she is no longer bound by tradition. Hari warns her she will eventually return, but he waits in vain for twenty-one years.

In the present, Vasudha expresses a wish to be reunited with Aarav in death at the place where he died. Hari, honoring her final wish, scatters her ashes in the forests of Bastar, where Aarav lost his life, symbolically reuniting the two after death.

== Cast ==
- Vidya Balan as Vasudha Hari Prasad
- Emraan Hashmi as Aarav Ruparel
- Rajkummar Rao as Hari Prasad
- Sara Khan as Naila, Aarav's Assistant
- Suhasini Mulay as Mrs. Prasad, Hari's mother
- Narendra Jha as ACP Patil
- Prabal Panjabi as Apurva
- Uday Chandra as Jeevan Rane
- Madhurima Tuli as Avni Prasad, Saanjh's wife (cameo appearance)
- Namit Das as an adult Saanjh Prasad, Vasudha's son (cameo appearance)
- Amala Akkineni as Rohini Ruparel (cameo appearance)

== Production ==
=== Development ===
On 23 October 2013, Vishesh Films and Fox Star Studios extended their partnership by announcing a three-film deal, which included CityLights, Hamari Adhuri Kahani, and Mr. X. It was revealed that Hamari Adhuri Kahani would be directed by Mohit Suri and was initially slated for release on 7 November 2013. However, filming, which was originally scheduled to begin in May–June 2014, was delayed until October 2014 due to Hashmi's son's illness.

In February 2014, Mahesh Bhatt, the film's producer, revealed in an interview with Bombay Times that he himself would write the story, which is inspired by the love story of his parents, Nanabhai Bhatt, Shirin Mohammad Ali, and his stepmother. In an interview with Mumbai Mirror, Suri mentioned that Balan had to lose weight and get in shape for the role. Prior to the film's development, rumors spread that Balan had opted out of the film to take some personal time, and that her character would be replaced by Shraddha Kapoor. However, on 14 March 2014, Bhatt refuted these rumors, confirming that Balan was "still on board".

On 13 June 2014, the final release date of the film was announced as 12 June 2015.

=== Casting ===
The lead cast of Hamari Adhuri Kahani was finalized on 23 October 2013, with Vidya Balan and Emraan Hashmi taking on the main roles, marking their third collaboration after The Dirty Picture (2011) and Ghanchakkar (2013). On 12 February 2014, it was confirmed that Rajkummar Rao would join the cast. On 6 October 2014, it was revealed that Rao would play the role of Vidya Balan's character's husband, though he clarified that while his role was pivotal, it wasn't extensive in terms of screen time.

On 15 December 2014, reports surfaced that Amala Akkineni would make a cameo appearance in the film, where she would sing and enact the title song. Later, on 26 December 2014, it was announced that Sara Khan would also be joining the cast.

=== Filming ===
Initially, the first schedule of Hamari Adhuri Kahani was planned to be extensively shot in Cape Town, South Africa. However, filming began in Kolkata on 2 October 2014. A portion of the film's climax was shot on 3 October 2014, where Vidya Balan and Emraan Hashmi participated in the immersion processions on Kolkata's crowded roads, with the iconic Howrah Bridge in the background. Another part of the climax was filmed on 5 January 2015 inside an old, bardy-style house in Kolkata.

After completing the Kolkata schedule, the crew shifted to Dubai for a 16-day shoot, which had been delayed due to weather conditions. On 20 October 2014, Balan and Hashmi were spotted filming at Dubai International Airport, with further shoots taking place around the city, including locations like Sheikh Zayed Road, Business Bay, Heritage Village, Bur Dubai, Jumeirah, and Dubai Marina. After completing this portion, the team resumed filming in Cape Town before returning to Dubai for an additional two days, during which scenes were shot in Meena Bazaar and along Dubai Creek.

The final scene in the United Arab Emirates was filmed on 17 November 2014 at Miracle Garden. Director Mohit Suri mentioned that while Dubai is often portrayed for its modern, high-tech buildings, he wanted to capture its softer, romantic side. The film also features Abu Dhabi's Qasr Al Sarb desert resort. After the UAE schedule, the team shot the remaining scenes in Mumbai, wrapping up production in mid-January 2015.

== Soundtrack ==
Hamari Adhuri Kahani

Soundtrack album by Jeet Gannguli, Mithoon, Ami Mishra and Zubeen Garg
- Released: 25 May 2015
- Genre: Feature film soundtrack
- Length: 42:21
- Label: Sony Music

Jeet Gannguli chronology
Ishqedarriyaan (2015)	Hamari Adhuri Kahani (2015)	Phir Se... (2015)

Mithoon chronology
Alone (2015)	Hamari Adhuri Kahani (2015)	Shab (2015)

Ami Mishra chronology
Hamari Adhuri Kahani (2015)	Half Girlfriend (2017)

Zubeen Garg chronology
Gaane Ki Aane (2015)	Hamari Adhuri Kahani (2015)	Dil Toh Deewana Hai (2016)

The music for the film is composed by Jeet Gannguli, Mithoon, Ami Mishra and Zubeen Garg. The song "Yeh Kaisi Jagah" was recorded at Zubeen's studio Sound & Silence. Zubeen programmed track music and helped to compose the song. Lyrics are penned by Rashmi Virag, Sayeed Quadri, Kunaal Vermaa. "Zaroori Tha" song from the film was originally a soundtrack of singer Rahat Fateh Ali Khan's album Back 2 Love. The album was named "Best Bollywood Album of June 2015" by Deccan Music.

Track listing
No.	Title	Lyrics	Music	Singer(s)	Length
1.	"Hamari Adhuri Kahani" (Title Track)	Rashmi Virag	Jeet Gannguli	Arijit Singh	6:38
2.	"Humnava"	Sayeed Quadri	Mithoon	Papon	5:29
3.	"Yeh Kaisi Jagah"	Rashmi Virag	Jeet Gannguli and Zubeen Garg	Zubeen Garg, Deepali Sathe	4:37
4.	"Hasi"	Kunaal Vermaa	Ami Mishra	Ami Mishra	4:32
5.	"Hasi" (Female)	Kunaal Vermaa	Ami Mishra	Shreya Ghoshal	3:12
6.	"Hamari Adhuri Kahani" (Encore)	Rashmi Virag	Jeet Gannguli	Jeet Gannguli	6:39
7.	"Zaroori Tha"	Imran Raza	Sahir Ali Bagga	Rahat Fateh Ali Khan	5:42
Total length:					42:21

== Release ==
Hamari Adhuri Kahani released worldwide on 12 June 2015.

== Reception ==
Meena Iyer of The Times of India rated Hamari Adhuri Kahani 2.5 out of 5 stars, stating that while the film "lacks soul," she praised the performances of the lead cast and described the music as a "soothing balm".

== Awards and nominations ==
Year	Award Ceremony	Category	Recipient(s) and nominee(s)	Result	Ref.
2015	Mirchi Music Awards	Upcoming Male Vocalist of The Year	Ami Mishra – "Hasi"	Nominated	
2015	Mirchi Music Awards	Upcoming Music Composer of The Year	Ami Mishra – "Hasi (Male)"	Nominated	
2015	Mirchi Music Awards	Upcoming Lyricist of The Year	Kunaal Vermaa – "Hasi (Male)"	Nominated	
