= Baadshaho =

2017 Indian film by Milan Luthria

- Theatrical release poster
- Directed by: Milan Luthria
- Written by: Rajat Arora
- Produced by: Bhushan Kumar; Krishan Kumar; Milan Luthria
- Starring: Ajay Devgn; Emraan Hashmi; Ileana D'Cruz; Vidyut Jammwal; Esha Gupta; Sanjay Mishra; Priyanshu Chatterjee
- Cinematography: Sunita Radia
- Edited by: Aarif Sheikh
- Music by: Songs: Ankit Tiwari; Nusrat Fateh Ali Khan; Tanishk Bagchi; DJ Chetas; Abhijit Vaghani; Traditional Folk; Score: John Stewart Eduri
- Production companies: T-Series; Vertex Motion Pictures
- Distributed by: Mangal Murti Films; CineKorn Entertainment
- Release date: 1 September 2017
- Running time: 136 minutes
- Language: Hindi
- Budget: ₹90 crore
- Box office: est. ₹123.50 crore

Baadshaho (transl. Kings) is a 2017 Indian Hindi-language heist action thriller film written by Rajat Arora and directed by Milan Luthria. It stars Ajay Devgn, Emraan Hashmi, Ileana D'Cruz, Vidyut Jammwal, Esha Gupta, Sanjay Mishra, and Priyanshu Chatterjee. The film is set during the emergency era of 1975–77.

Baadshaho was released on 1 September 2017 worldwide and received mixed reviews from critics. It emerged as a moderate success at the box-office.

== Plot ==
In 1971, Maharani Gitanjali is a princess to a royal family in Rajasthan. Although every royal family was required to turn over their wealth at the end of the ancestral reign in the hands of the Reserve Bank of India as per the Indian Government's Nationalization plan Gitanjali's ancestors did not hand it over to the government. Four years later in 1975, Prime Minister Indira Gandhi declares a state of emergency in the country. Sanjeev, an influential person in the Congress government, plots revenge against Gitanjali after he was snubbed badly by her in 1973. Sanjeev asks Colonel Rudra Pratap Singh to confiscate all the gold in Gitanjali's possession and put her behind bars. Rudra follows Sanjeev's instructions and imprisons Gitanjali after forcibly taking possession of her gold. Rudra asks his trusted lieutenants Major Seher Singh and Captain Somesh to transfer all the gold to Delhi into the government's safekeeping.

For this purpose, Rudra gives Seher Singh a custom-made truck with a powerful safe to transport the confiscated gold. As Rudra and Seher Singh are discussing, Gitanjali's trusted aide Sanjana is sent by her to eavesdrop on their conversation and get a whiff of their plan. Gitanjali wants Sanjana to accompany her trusted lieutenant Bhavani Singh in getting all the gold back and eventually release her from prison. Gitanjali briefs Bhavani about the gold and her reasons for keeping it - she needs the money to look after the people in her village. The loyal Bhavani promises to retrieve the gold and return it to Gitanjali. Along with Daliya, Guruji, and Sanjana, Bhavani chalks out their plan and sets out on the mission. The four follow the truck in which Seher Singh and his deputy Somesh are carrying the gold to Delhi. The group takes control of the truck after throwing out Seher Singh and Somesh. The job now is to open the strong safe, something at which Guruji is adept.

Meanwhile, Seher Singh, Rudra Pratap Singh, and other army and cops are hot on the trail of Bhavani and the truck. At one point, the army officers seek the help of police officer Durjan, but Bhavani and his team members outwit him. Before returning the gold to Gitanjali Devi, Bhavani learns that Gitanjali used him for her personal happiness and motives and that Seher was her aide. Bhavani reveals that he already knew the truth about Gitanjali, where his team decided to distribute gold among poor people who suffered from Gitanjali's wrath. After the war between Seher and Bhavani's team ends, Gitanjali realizes that she is alone in the desert with a low chance of survival, while Bhavani and his team escape.

== Cast ==
- Ajay Devgn as Bhavani Singh
- Ileana D'Cruz as Rani Gitanjali Devi (based on Gayatri Devi)
- Emraan Hashmi as Dalia
- Esha Gupta as Sanjana Rao
- Vidyut Jammwal as Major Seher Singh
- Sanjay Mishra as Tikla aka Guruji
- Denzil Smith as Colonel Rudra Pratap Singh
- Lankesh Bhardwaj as Supdt. Meena
- Priyanshu Chatterjee as Sanjeev (based on Sanjay Gandhi)
- Sharad Kelkar as Inspector Durjan
- Ravi Kale as Babu Moshai
- Sunny Leone as a dancer in the song "Piya More"

== Production ==
=== Development ===
In January 2015, Ajay Devgn was confirmed to star in Milan Luthria's upcoming drama Baadshaho which would mark his fourth collaboration with Luthria following Kachche Dhaage (1999), Chori Chori (2003), and Once Upon a Time in Mumbaai (2010).

=== Casting ===
Several actresses including Aishwarya Rai, Kareena Kapoor, Katrina Kaif, Shruti Hassan and Priyanka Chopra were reported to be the lead actress opposite Ajay Devgn. Although Kapoor and Kaif expressed interest, both declined due to scheduling conflicts. Diljit Dosanjh was initially cast in the film, but later opted out of the project and was replaced by Emraan Hashmi, marking his third collaboration with Luthria following Once Upon a Time in Mumbaai and The Dirty Picture.

=== Filming ===
Principal photography commenced in August 2016 in Mumbai. The second schedule began in December 2016 in Jodhpur, Rajasthan. The third schedule commenced on 19 January 2017. The Rajasthan schedule wrapped in March 2017.

== Release ==
The film was initially scheduled to release worldwide on 22 December 2016. However, at the request of producers Ritesh Sidhwani and Rakesh Roshan, whose films Raees and Kaabil, respectively, were scheduled for release around the same time, the release date was postponed to 12 May 2017. In early December 2016, Ajay Devgn announced that the film would instead be released worldwide on 1 September 2017.

== Soundtrack ==
Baadshaho

Soundtrack album by Rahul Dev Burman, Nusrat Fateh Ali Khan, Tanishk Bagchi, Ankit Tiwari, Abhijit Vaghani, DJ Chetas and Traditional Folk
- Released: 19 August 2017
- Genre: Feature film soundtrack
- Length: 30:52
- Language: Hindi
- Label: T-Series
External audio
- Audio Jukebox on YouTube

The soundtrack was released on 19 August 2017 by T-Series. It consists of eight songs composed by Tanishk Bagchi, Ankit Tiwari, Abhijit Vaghani, DJ Chetas and Traditional Folk. The songs "Mere Rashke Qamar" and "Socha Hai" ("Kehdoon Tumhe" from the 1975 film Deewaar) were recreations for the film by lyricist Manoj Muntashir and composer Tanishk Bagchi. Their originals were written by Fana Buland Shehri and Sahir Ludhianvi, and were composed by Nusrat Fateh Ali Khan and R. D. Burman respectively.

The song "Piya More" (first version) is a remake from Ankit Tiwari's old tune "Nasha Sar Pe Chadke Bole" (from the film "Dee Saturday Night").

The lyrics of the song "Socha Hai" were later changed due to copyright issues.

All lyrics are written by Manoj Muntashir.

Track listing
No.	Title	Music	Singer(s)	Length
1.	"Mere Rashke Qamar"	Nusrat Fateh Ali Khan, Tanishk Bagchi	Nusrat Fateh Ali Khan, Rahat Fateh Ali Khan	3:40
2.	"Chalo Dildar Chalo"	Himesh Reshamiya	Yazin Nizar, Sunidhi Chauhan	4:17
3.	"Socha Hai"	R. D. Burman, Tanishk Bagchi	Jubin Nautiyal, Neeti Mohan, (Additional Vocals: Kishore Kumar, Asha Bhosle)	2:50
4.	"Hoshiyar Rehna" (Traditional lyrics)	Traditional Folk	Neeraj Arya's Kabir Café	4:07
5.	"Mere Rashke Qamar" (Version 2)	Nusrat Fateh Ali Khan, Tanishk Bagchi	Tulsi Kumar	3:41
6.	"Socha Hai" (2nd Version)	R. D. Burman, Tanishk Bagchi	Jubin Nautiyal, Neeti Mohan	4:13
7.	"Mere Rashke Qamar" (Remix)	Tanishk Bagchi, Remix by: DJ Chetas	Nusrat Fateh Ali Khan, Rahat Fateh Ali Khan	3:36
8.	"Socha Hai" (Love Version)	R. D. Burman, Abhijit Vaghani	Jubin Nautiyal, Neeti Mohan	4:28
Total length:				30:52

== Reception ==
=== Critical response ===
Meena Iyer of The Times of India gave 3 out of 5 stars, writing "On paper, Baadshaho may have had the merit of a Hollywood heist thriller like Ocean’s Eleven. This would seem like why Ajay Devgn agreed to be a part of this multi-starrer-- that attempts to make outlaws look like Robin Hood. However good intention is defeated, when the execution offers zero novelty". Arnab Chatterjee of Deccan Chronicle wrote that "The attempt of inducing any substance or emotional depth is quickly derailed by the story's loose approach to reason and logic". Saibal Chatterjee of NDTV gave 1.5 stars and wrote "Ajay Devgn's film a heist thriller devoid of the sort of highs that could be talked about". Udita Jhunjunwala of Firstpost wrote "The team of writer Rajat Aroraa and director Milan Luthria present their trademark brand of glib one-liners and needlessly pumped up bravado in Baadshaho". Sukanya Verma of Rediff gave 1 out of 5 stars writing "Baadshaho's sluggish screenplay and humourless rhythm are spectacularly low on swagger and daredevilry, feels Sukanya Verma".

== Accolades ==
Award	Category	Recipient	Result	Ref.(s)
10th Mirchi Music Awards	Male Vocalist of The Year	Rahat Fateh Ali Khan for "Mere Rashke Qamar"	Nominated	
