= Mere Rashke Qamar =

1988 song composed by Nusrat Fateh Ali Khan performed by Nusrat Fateh Ali Khan

Song by Nusrat Fateh Ali Khan
- Language: Urdu: "میرے رشک قمر"
- Released: 1 January 1988
- Recorded: 1987
- Genre: Ghazal, Qawwali
- Length: 17:38
- Label: Hi-Tech Music
- Composer: Nusrat Fateh Ali Khan
- Lyricist: Fana Buland Shehri
External audio
- "Mere Rashke Qamar" on YouTube

"Mere Rashke Qamar" (Urdu: میرے رشک قمر; lit. "O Envy of the Moon") is a ghazal-qawwali written by Urdu poet Fana Buland Shehri and originally composed by Nusrat Fateh Ali Khan. It was first performed in 1988 by Khan and popularized by him, and was later also performed by his nephew Rahat Fateh Ali Khan at different concerts.

== Versions ==
=== 2013 remix ===
"Mere Rashke Qamar"

Remix by Nusrat Fateh Ali Khan

from the album Reformed
- Released: 5 April 2013
- Recorded: 1988
- Genre: Ghazal, Qawwali
- Length: 4:53
- Label: Oriental Star Agencies, Hi-Tech Music
- Composers: Nusrat Fateh Ali Khan, A1melodymaster
- Lyricist: Fana Buland Shehri
- Producer: A1melodymaster
External media
Audio
- "Mere Rashke Qamar" on YouTube
Video
- "Mere Rashke Qamar" on YouTube

It was recreated and released as a single on 5 April 2013 by A1melodymaster for the album Reformed; which released on 16 March 2017 with different renewed songs of Nusrat Fateh Ali Khan.

=== 2017 film version ===
"Mere Rashke Qamar"

Song by Nusrat Fateh Ali Khan, Rahat Fateh Ali Khan and Tulsi Kumar

from the album Baadshaho
- Released: 13 July 2017
- Recorded: 2016
- Genre: Filmi, Sufi
- Length: 3:40
- Label: T-Series
- Composers: Nusrat Fateh Ali Khan, Tanishk Bagchi
- Lyricists: Fana Buland Shehri, Manoj Muntashir
- Producer: Bhushan Kumar
External media
Audio
- audio on YouTube
- Female version on YouTube
- Remix on YouTube
Video
- video on YouTube
- Lyrical video on YouTube
- Female version music video on YouTube
- Female version lyrical video on YouTube

The song was recreated by lyricist Manoj Muntashir and composer Tanishk Bagchi for Milan Luthria's 2017 Hindi film Baadshaho; written by Rajat Arora. It features original version of Nusrat Fateh Ali Khan's voice with new version of Rahat Fateh Ali Khan's voice. The video; starring Ajay Devgn & Ileana D'Cruz; has been shot in different locales of Bikaner, Jodhpur and Jaisalmer.

Despite other controversies; created after 2016 Uri attack, due to which Pakistani artists were banned from working in India; producer Bhushan Kumar said that he was working for last one-and-a-half year on a track "that brings out the chemistry between Ajay and Ileana's characters". He said, "I was sure it had to be Nusrat saab's composition. I procured the rights and I'm thankful to Rahat for singing it." He felt happy with the response on the new version.

The soundtrack has a female version for the film too, in voice of Tulsi Kumar, which released on 21 August. Its music video was released on 25 August by her father's company T-Series, featuring Kumar herself.

Rahat was nominated for Mirchi Music Award for Male Vocalist of The Year in 10th Mirchi Music Awards, while Muntashir won the IIFA Award for Best Lyricist in 19th IIFA Awards.

== Music charts ==
The 2013 remix achieved chart success in 2017 in the UK, spending a number of weeks on the Official Charts Company before and after the release of 2017 version. Ten days after 2017 version's release, both were on top 14 on the Asian music chart by BBC. The latter than topped the Indian music charts by iTunes, BBC, Bollywood Hungama, Saavn and Gaana, and remained number 1 for weeks until beaten by Taylor Swift's "Look What You Made Me Do" on international level and Sharry Mann's "Hostel" on national level in India. It was also listed top 5 trending music video in India by YouTube Rewind, and was the second most searched song on Google India.

== Popularity ==
The song is very popular in Pakistan and India, and also has been adapted as cover version by many local artists.

Pakistan	India
Junaid Asghar; Naseebo Lal; Fadia Shaboroz; Haseeb Mubashir; Sara Raza Khan; Mohsin Abbas Haider; Myssah; Rabi Pirzada; Asghar Khoso (Auto rickshaw version); Abrar-ul-Haq (also covered as PTI version); Saima Jahan (for film Huey Tum Ajnabi); Sanam Marvi	Sonu Kakkar; Neha Kakkar's duet with Riya; Baba Sehgal; Pawan Singh; Rahul Vaidya; Rojalin Sahu; Qazi Touqeer; Vridhi Saini; Rituraj Mohanty; Sonakshi Kar; Ssameer; Yumna Ajin; Palak Muchhal

== See also ==
- Nusrat Fateh Ali Khan discography
- Rahat Fateh Ali Khan discography
