= Tum Hi Aana =

2018 Hindi ballad song by Jubin Nautiyal

Single by Jubin Nautiyal

from the album Marjaavaan
- Language: Hindi
- Released: 3 October 2019
- Genre: Indian pop
- Length: 4:09
- Label: T-Series
- Composer: Payal Dev
- Lyricist: Kunaal Vermaa

Music video
- Tum Hi Aana on YouTube

"Tum Hi Aana" (transl. You, please come back) is an Indian Hindi-language song from the soundtrack of the Indian feature film, Marjaavaan (2019). The pop ballad was released by major Indian label T-Series on 3 October 2019 as a single from the soundtrack. It was composed by Payal Dev, written by Kunaal Verma, and sung by Jubin Nautiyal. The melody of the song occurred to Dev, while she was working on a different track.

The song received positive reviews from film critics, the majority of whom complimented its composition. The song peaked at number one and two on the Official Charts Company Asian Music Charts and The Times of India Mirchi Top 20 Chart, respectively. The music video features Sidharth Malhotra and Tara Sutaria reprising their characters in Marjaavaan.

== Background and composition ==
Tum Hi Aana
Main chorus of the song.

Indian music composer Payal Dev described her composition for "Tum Hi Aana" as follows:

While working on another single, this melody came to my mind and I recorded on my phone. It so happened, that I, Jubin and Kunaal, were in a music sitting of another single and I made them hear the melody I had recorded.

After recording the melody, Kunal Verma instantly wrote "some lines", claimed Dev. The singer Jubin Nautiyal, who was also present, "instantly loved it and accepted to record a scratch of the song". Nautiyal said that the record label T-Series also loved the song. "Tum Hi Aana" was suggested to the director Milap Zaveri by the director of T-Series, Bhushan Kumar, when the latter was narrating the script of Marjaavaan. Furthermore, Zaveri said, "Bhushan Kumar made me listen to the scratch and I was immediately sold on it. I couldn't have asked for a better song to describe the situation". "Tum Hi Aana" was written by Verma and performed by Nautiyal.

Dev originally composed the song as a "romantic" track, but had to change the composition due to the film's romantic and sad theme. The lyrics were also altered to suit the theme. Dev used multiple instruments for her composition, including the sarangi, flute, piano, and mouth organ, "to give it the right amount of emotions". The song was called a pop ballad in press reviews. Milap Zaveri described the song as being "all about emotions, passion and heartbreak". The director compared the song with other tracks, saying "It's on the lines of "Bekhayali" and "Galliyan" from the films Kabir Singh and Ek Villain, respectively".

== Release and reception ==
The single version of "Tum Hi Aana" was released on 3 October 2019, for digital download by the record label Super Cassettes Industries Private Limited (T-Series). The happy, sad, and duet versions were all released on 27 November 2019 through the aforementioned label.

"Tum Hi Aana" was met with positive reviews from film critics. The staff of Asian News International wrote that the song will "tug your heartstrings as it is all about emotions and heartbreak". Abhishek Singh, writing for The Indian Express, expressed that the song "can be a bit much with how sad it is" but in the verdict, he wrote "[the song] is worth listening to at least once. If you’re into it, you’ll probably end up having it on repeat". Devarsi Ghosh of Scroll.in said that the song is "fabulous" and praised Nautiyal, stating that: "It is undoubtedly the best composition Nautiyal has sung till date". The staff of The Times of India praised the song, writing that it will "make you teary-eyed for sure". The staff from Koimoi praised the composer, "Dev has done the music composition really well and the symphony at the back mixed with flutes tunes is absolutely mellow to the ears".

Times Now's Gaurang Chauhan claimed that, "The melodious tune and Jubin's soothing voice will instantly transport you back to the good old days of the 90s". The staff of Indian magazine Outlook cited the song for having "won acclaim and popularity" for Dev. News18's staff wrote, "The soulful romantic number Tum Hi Aana is a tear-jerker, to say the least". Rafat Sami from the Glamsham regarded, "Verma's lyrics, though filmy, touch the heart and are simple and relatable". Keyur Seta of Cinestaan believed that the song is "Motif" throughout Marjaavaan. DJ Munks from BizAsia wrote that, " [the song] does have a very deeply moving and soulful instrumentation that makes this a gorgeous melody to listen to".

== Music video ==
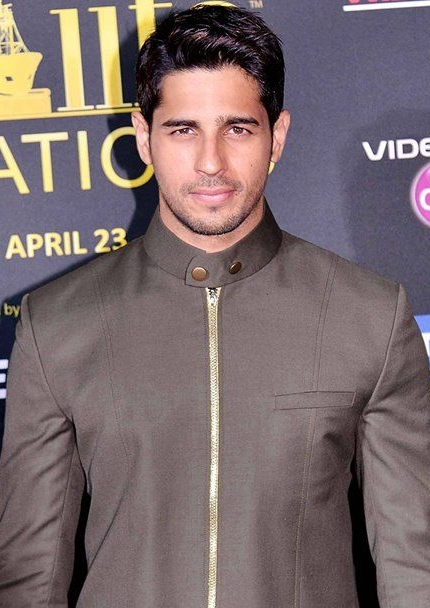
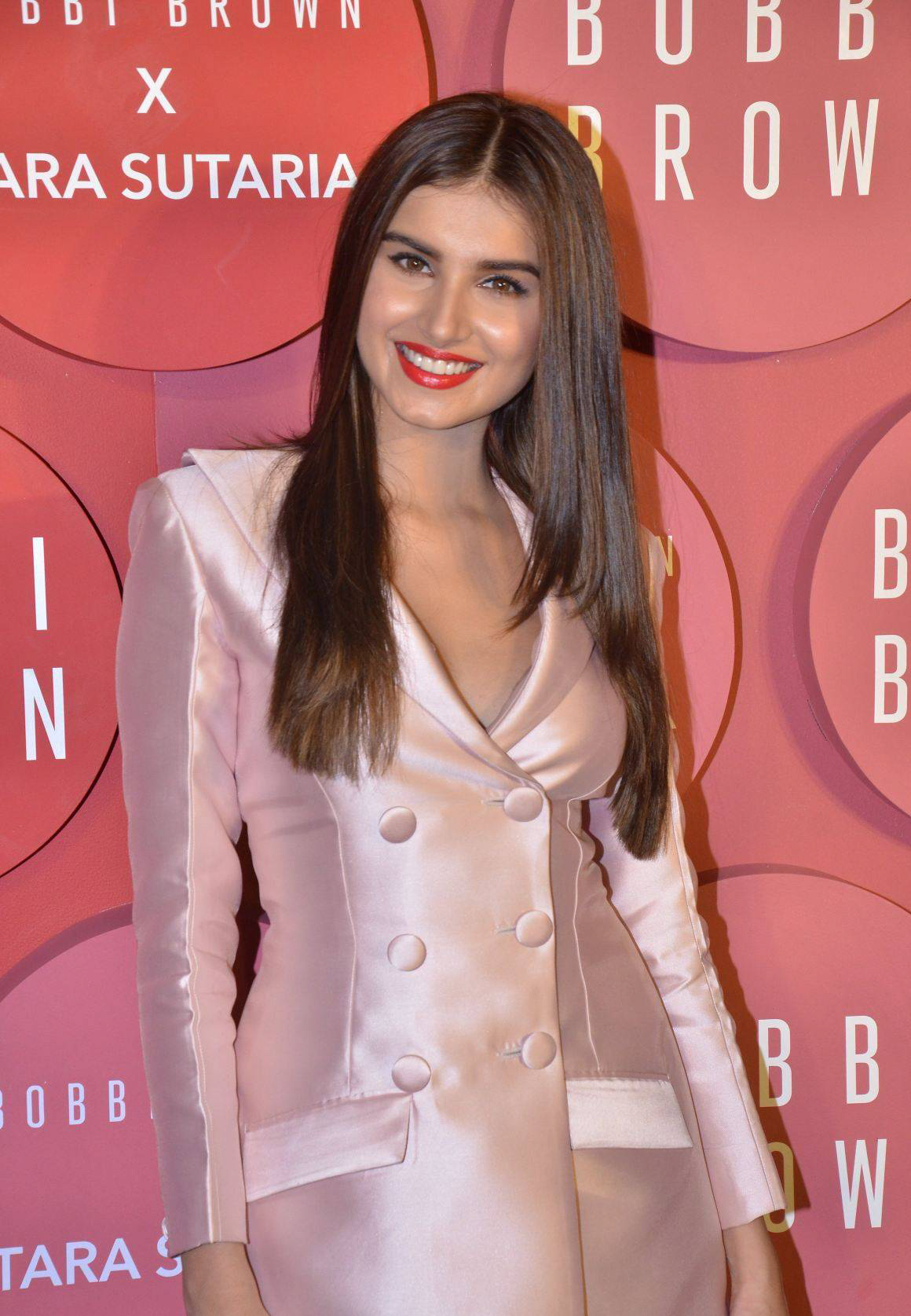
The song's music video features Sidharth Malhotra and Tara Sutaria, pictured top and bottom, respectively.

The music video was released on 2 October 2019 to YouTube. Zoya (Tara Sutaria) plays a mute character alongside Raghu (Sidharth Malhotra) in Marjaavaan, a goon who falls in love with her. Within the film Raghu is a loyal goon to the local thug Narayan Anna (Nassar), who orders Raghu to kill Zoya, not knowing that Raghu loves her because she was an eyewitness of a crime that Narayan Anna's son Vishnu Riteish Deshmukh committed. In the music video for "Tum Hi Aana", Raghu is sentenced to jail for murdering Zoya and reminisces about his dead lover. Two days after its release, "Tum Hi Aana" crossed over 14 million views on YouTube. Within a few weeks, the song had received over 50 million views on YouTube.

== Commercial performance ==
"Tum Hi Aana" debuted and peaked at number one on the Official Charts Company Asian Music Charts and spent a total of 30 weeks on the chart. The song reached number two on The Times of India Mirchi Top 20, where it spent a total of nine weeks on the chart.

== Charts ==
Chart (2019)	Peak position
Asian Music Charts (Official Charts Company)	1
Mirchi Top 20 (The Times of India)	2

== Credits and personnel ==
Credits adapted from YouTube.

- Jubin Nautiyal – lead vocals
- Payal Dev – music
- Kunal Verma – lyrics
- Aditya Dev – music producer

== Track listings ==
Original Version
No.	Title	Length
1.	"Tum Hi Aana"	4:09

Happy Version
No.	Title	Length
1.	"Tum Hi Aana"	2:49

Sad Version
No.	Title	Length
1.	"Tum Hi Aana"	1:23

Duet Version
No.	Title	Length
1.	"Tum Hi Aana"	4:08

== Release history ==
Country	Date	Format(s)	Version	Label	Ref(s).
India	3 October 2019	Digital download	Original	Super Cassettes Industries Private Limited	
India	27 November 2019	Digital download	Happy	Super Cassettes Industries Private Limited	
India	27 November 2019	Digital download	Sad	Super Cassettes Industries Private Limited	
India	27 November 2019	Digital download	Duet	Super Cassettes Industries Private Limited	
