= Baarish (song) =

Song performed by Tanishk Bagchi

- Baarish song cover featuring actors Arjun Kapoor and Shraddha Kapoor

Song by Tanishk Bagchi featuring Ash King & Shashaa Tirupati

from the album Half Girlfriend
- Language: Hindi
- Released: 11 April 2017
- Genre: Filmi, Indian pop, Ghazal
- Length: 4:36
- Label: Zee Music
- Composer: Tanishk Bagchi
- Lyricists: Arafat Mehmood, Tanishk Bagchi

"Baarish" (transl. Rain) is a Hindi song from the film Half Girlfriend. It is written by Arafat Mehmood and Tanishk Bagchi, and composed by Tanishk Bagchi. It is sung by Ash King.

== Background ==
According to a report by the Hindustan Times newspaper, singer Jubin Nautiyal claimed he had recorded the song and was shocked when he realized his version was not retained. Reacting to the statement, composer Tanishk Bagchi said they had recorded the song with many singers but found Ash King's version to be the most suitable for the film.

== Release and response ==
It was released on 11 April 2017 by Zee Music Company on YouTube. The recording by Ash King was well received; within a few days of its release, the music video garnered 10 million views on YouTube.

== Critical reception ==
The Times of India reviewed the song as the monsoon song of the year for all those romantic at heart.

India.com in its review wrote: "The composers have used Santoor in the song which gives us the feel of rain. Santoor is the only instrument that gives us the feel of nature and happiness within seconds and the effect is clearly visible in this song too. The lyrics is quite catchy in the main verse and compels us to hum it However, the stanzas are a bit boring and we need to hear it a couple of times to fit it into our minds. Singers Ash King & Shashaa Tirupati have done a wonderful job. The song is composed by Tanishk Bagchi and written by Arafat Mehmood & Tanishk Bagchi again".

The song received mixed reviews by the The Indian Express, which wrote: "The song’s lyrics, which are written by Arafat Mehmood and Tanishk Bagchi, are nothing beyond mediocre. And it is surprising because both of them have done some incredible work in the past. It reminds us of the strong connection between Shraddha and rains, they have been almost inseparable in all her films. We literally cannot think of a movie without a rain song picturised on Shraddha. What's also amusing is the fact that she is under the rain but for most part of the song, she doesn't get wet. Are you serious? This song is definitely not the best work of director Mohit Suri, who has musical hits like Aashiqui 2 and Ek Villain to his credit. But we are sure it would become one of your favorites, especially if you are friendzoned or in a one-sided relationship."

== Charts ==
=== Weekly charts ===
| Chart (2017) | Peak position | Reference |
|---|---|---|
| Mirchi Top 20 | 1 | |

=== Year-end charts ===
| Chart (2017) | Position |
|---|---|
| Mirchi Top 100 | 1 |

== Credits and personnel ==
- Vocals – Ash King and Shashaa Tirupati
- Music – Tanishk Bagchi
- Lyrics – Arafat Mehmood and Tanishk Bagchi
- Guitars – Mayukh Sarkar and Tanishk Bagchi
- Santoor – Prashant
- Violins – Manas
- Mixing and mastering – Eric Pillai (Future Sound of Bombay)
- Assistant mixing engineers – Michael Edwin Pillai and Lucky
- Programming – Tanishk Bagchi and Shamita (Team Acid)

== Awards and nominations ==
| Year | Award | Category | Recipient | Result |
|---|---|---|---|---|
| 2018 | Zee Cine Awards | Song of the Year | Tanishk Bagchi | Won |
| 2018 | Zee Cine Awards | Best Playback Singer (Male) | Ash King | Nominated |
| 2018 | Filmfare Awards | Best Music Album | Various | Nominated |
| 2018 | Filmfare Awards | Best Male Playback Singer | Ash King | Nominated |
| 2018 | Mirchi Music Awards | Song of The Year | – | Nominated |
| 2018 | Mirchi Music Awards | Male Vocalist of The Year | Ash King | Nominated |
| 2018 | Mirchi Music Awards | Music Composer of The Year | Tanishk Bagchi | Nominated |
| 2018 | Mirchi Music Awards | Lyricist of The Year | Arafat Mehmood & Tanishk Bagchi | Nominated |
