= Back 2 Love (album) =

2014 studio album by Rahat Fateh Ali Khan

Studio album by Rahat Fateh Ali Khan
- Released: 9 June 2014
- Genres: Qawwali, Pakistani pop, Indi-pop
- Length: 48:42
- Label: Universal Music India

Rahat Fateh Ali Khan chronology
Chandigarh Da Chaska (2014)	Back 2 Love (2014)

Singles from Back 2 Love
- 1. "Zaroori Tha" Released: 8 June 2014

Back 2 Love is an album by Pakistani Qawwali singer Ustad Rahat Fateh Ali Khan. The album was released globally on 9 June 2014. Back 2 Love is a collection of 10 songs including collaborations with Indian musicians and singers like Salim–Sulaiman and Shreya Ghoshal.

== Music video(s) ==
=== Zaroori Tha ===
The lyrics for the song "Zaroori Tha" are written by Khalil-ur-Rehman Qamar and it is composed by Sahir Ali Bagga. Its music video has been directed by Rahul Sud, and it features the Bigg Boss 7 couple Gauahar Khan and Kushal Tandon. It was released on 8 June 2014. It became the first Pakistani origin non-film YouTube India/Vevo music video to surpass 1.67 billion views, doing so over a span of ten years.

The song was also featured in Mohit Suri's 2015 film Hamari Adhuri Kahani, starring Emraan Hashmi and Vidya Balan.

== Track listing ==
The full track list was announced at iTunes on 7 May 2014. The song Rab Jaane was awarded as the "Indi Pop Song of the Year" at 7th Mirchi Music Awards.

No.	Title	Singer(s)	Length
1.	"Rab Jaane"	Rahat Fateh Ali Khan	6:24
2.	"Habibi" (feat. Salim – Sulaiman)	Rahat Fateh Ali Khan, Salim–Sulaiman	4:51
3.	"Rim Jhim" (feat. Shreya Ghoshal)	Rahat Fateh Ali Khan, Shreya Ghoshal	4:30
4.	"Zaroori Tha"	Rahat Fateh Ali Khan	5:42
5.	"Nach Dumadum"	Rahat Fateh Ali Khan	5:45
6.	"Sab Jhoote"	Rahat Fateh Ali Khan	3:59
7.	"Dil Ke Taar"	Rahat Fateh Ali Khan	4:55
8.	"Sharab E Husn"	Rahat Fateh Ali Khan	4:15
9.	"Aag Lagi"	Rahat Fateh Ali Khan	3:44
10.	"Fusion in Raag Champa Kali"	Rahat Fateh Ali Khan	4:30
Total length:			48:42
