= Marjaavaan =

2019 Indian Hindi film by Milap Zaveri

- Theatrical release poster
- Directed by: Milap Zaveri
- Written by: Milap Zaveri
- Produced by: Bhushan Kumar; Krishan Kumar; Divya Khosla Kumar; Monisha Advani; Madhu Bhojwani; Nikkhil Advani
- Starring: Riteish Deshmukh; Sidharth Malhotra; Tara Sutaria; Rakul Preet Singh
- Cinematography: Nigam Bomzan
- Edited by: Maahir Zaveri
- Music by: Songs: Tanishk Bagchi; Meet Bros; Payal Dev; Yo Yo Honey Singh; Aditya Dev; Sanjoy Chowdhury; Score: Sanjoy Chowdhury Chandan Saxena; D. Imman (Theme music, reused from Viswasam)
- Production companies: T-Series Films; Emmay Entertainment
- Distributed by: PEN Marudhar Cine Entertainment (India); Eros International (Overseas)
- Release date: 15 November 2019
- Running time: 135 minutes
- Country: India
- Language: Hindi
- Budget: ₹38 crore(Note: Contains print and advertising costs)
- Box office: ₹65.34 crore

Marjaavaan (transl. I will die) is a 2019 Hindi-language romantic action film written and directed by Milap Zaveri. It stars Riteish Deshmukh, Sidharth Malhotra, Tara Sutaria and Rakul Preet Singh.

Marjaavaan was released in theatres worldwide on 15 November 2019, and received mixed reviews from critics. However, its music album of released under T-Series became one of the biggest chartbusters with songs like "Tum Hi Aana", "Thodi Jagah" and "Kinna Sona", and the item number "Ek Toh Kam Zindagani" garnering charts. It was distributed by Pen Entertainment in India and Eros International overseas.

== Plot ==
Raghu is a goon loyal to the thug Narayan Anna who controls the water mafia in Mumbai. Anna's dependence on Raghu doesn't sit well with Vishnu, Narayan Anna's son, whose complexes arise from more than just his short stature, as he is only three feet tall. When Raghu falls for Zoya, a mute Kashmiri girl who teaches children music, Vishnu jumps at the opportunity to use it to discredit his father's most favourite goon.

Zoya witnesses Gaitonde's murder by Vishnu so Vishnu orders Raghu to kill her, not knowing that Raghu loves her. The couple tries to run but Vishnu catches them and orders the couple and all the kids killed. Vishnu says Raghu and the kids will be safe if he kills only Zoya, as she is the sole eyewitness. Zoya tells Raghu to kill her so he and the kids remain safe. Raghu can't so she gives him the gun, places her thumb over his, and pulls the trigger. She dies in his arms.

The police arrest Raghu for Zoya's murder while her dead body is laid to rest by the community. In jail, he becomes depressed and broken. Vishnu unsuccessfully tries to get Raghu killed in jail, knowing if he is released, he will take revenge. When Vishnu reveals that Raghu will be sentenced to life, Vishnu helps Raghu get out by bribing the proofs, planning to kill him upon his release.

However, when Raghu returns, Vishnu sees that he is not the same after Zoya's death. He tries to bring Raghu back to his old ways but fails. Narayan warns Vishnu to stop but he angrily kills Narayan and sends goons to Raghu. Raghu kills them all and vows revenge on Vishnu; his friends join him.

On the day of Dussera, when Vishnu comes to burn Ravana's idol, Raghu arrives. Vishnu shoots an arrow into his heart, but Raghu burns him. Raghu sees Zoya and dies peacefully, surrounded by friends and family. The police arrive and Assistant Commissioner of Police, Ravi Yadav, states that Raghu has returned to his life, which was with Zoya.

== Cast ==
- Riteish Deshmukh as Vishnu Anna Shetty
- Sidharth Malhotra as Raghuvendra Nath (Raghu)
- Tara Sutaria as Zoya Ahmed
- Rakul Preet Singh as Aarzoo Hussain
- Nassar as Narayan Anna Shetty
- Shaad Randhawa as Mazhar
- Ravi Kishan as ACP Ravi Yadav
- Om Kanojiya as Timepass
- Anant Jog as Gaitonde
- Amit Mehra as Gaitonde's son
- Varinder Singh Ghuman as Rakka
- Bikramjeet Kanwarpal as Prison Fighter
- Godaan Kumar as Shafi
- Uday Nene as Gopi
- Alina Kazi as Payal Hussain
- Swati Seth as Zarika
- Nora Fatehi in a special appearance in the song "Ek Toh Kum Zindagani"
- Nushrat Bharucha in a special appearance in the song "Peeyu Datt Ke"

== Production ==
=== Filming ===
Principal photography began on 7 December 2018 with Malhotra sharing his picture on his official Instagram account. The second schedule is set to roll in from mid-January and will end by March 2019. Sidharth Malhotra is shooting with a dozen goons and has switched to action mode. "The stunt team wanted to shoot with a body double because Sidharth's back and shoulder would be on fire but he was adamant on doing the scene himself to make it look authentic and stay true to his character". Siddharth wrapped up his portion except for songs on 15 March 2019. He announced the news by posting a picture with crews with a heartfelt message. In November 2019, Deshmukh revealed that Shah Rukh Khan had helped the production team with some VFX shots for the former's role as a dwarf.

== Marketing ==
The official poster of the film was shared by Sidharth Malhotra on 30 October 2018, announcing the release date of 8 November 2019. On 5 August 2019, Malhotra announced that the film is delayed to avoid the clash with Siddharth Anand's big budget film War starring Tiger Shroff and Hrithik Roshan, but the release date was not confirmed. On 23 August 2019, the first poster was unveiled by Malhotra, giving the new release date of 8 November 2019. On 3 September, a second poster was unveiled, in which it was shown that the release date of the film is advanced to 8 November. On 10 October, he announced new release date of film is 15 November 2019.

== Soundtrack ==
Marjaavaan

Soundtrack album by Tanishk Bagchi, Meet Bros, Payal Dev, Yo Yo Honey Singh, Aditya Dev, Sanjoy Chowdhury and D. Imman
- Released: 27 November 2019
- Recorded: 2018–19
- Genre: Feature film soundtrack
- Length: 51:10
- Language: Hindi
- Label: T-Series
- Producer: Bhushan Kumar
External audio
- Official Audio Jukebox on YouTube

This music of film is composed by Tanishk Bagchi, Meet Bros, Payal Dev, Yo Yo Honey Singh, Aditya Dev and Sanjoy Chowdhury with lyrics written by Kumaar, Tanishk Bagchi, Kunaal Vermaa, Manoj Muntashir, A. M. Turaz, Rashmi Virag, Prasoon Joshi, Yo Yo Honey Singh, Dope Leo and Mujtaba Aziz Naza.

The second song, "Ek Toh Kum Zindagani", is a remake of the song "Pyar Do Pyar Lo" from the film Janbaaz, being the second remake of the song after Anees Bazmee's Thank You, where it was composed by Pritam.

The fourth song Haiya Ho, is a remake of "Chahe Meri Jaan Tu Le Le", a song from Dayavan.

Two songs of the film which were removed from the final cut were released later as singles as they didn't go well with the narrative of the film. They were the song "Peeyu Datt Ke", starring Nushrat Bharucha which was released on 2 December 2019 and the song Masakali 2.0 which is a recreated version of the song "Masakali" from the 2009 film Delhi-6 and was released on 8 April 2020 by T-Series. Upon release, the song was panned by the makers of the original, including composer A. R. Rahman, lyricist Prasoon Joshi and singer Mohit Chauhan. Tanishk Bagchi, the creator of the song, was also trolled on entertainment websites and social media platforms.

Kinna Sona, a Pakistani song originally sung by the Pakistani qawwal Nusrat Fateh Ali Khan, was covered by Pakistani singer Atif Aslam for the film's soundtrack. In February 2019 the All Indian Cine Workers Association levied a ban on all Pakistani artists, hence the track was replaced at the last minute by a version sung by the Indian singer Jubin Nautiyal. Although the song remained a cover of the Pakistani Qawwali. In June 2020 T-Series released the initial cover sung by Atif Aslam on YouTube, however were forced to remove it and issue an 'apology' after a threat-laced campaign led by the far-right Indian nationalist party: Maharashtra Navnirman Sena.

Track listing
No.	Title	Lyrics	Music	Singer(s)	Length
1.	"Tum Hi Aana"	Kunaal Vermaa	Payal Dev	Jubin Nautiyal	4:09
2.	"Ek Toh Kum Zindagani"	Tanishk Bagchi, A. M. Turaz	Tanishk Bagchi	Neha Kakkar, Yash Narvekar	3:10
3.	"Thodi Jagah"	Rashmi Virag	Tanishk Bagchi	Arijit Singh	3:38
4.	"Haiya Ho"	Tanishk Bagchi	Tanishk Bagchi	Tulsi Kumar, Jubin Nautiyal	2:50
5.	"Kinna Sona"	Kumaar	Meet Bros	Jubin Nautiyal, Dhvani Bhanushali	4:33
6.	"Raghupati Raghav Raja Ram"	Manoj Muntashir	Tanishk Bagchi	Palak Muchhal	3:28
7.	"Hasbi Rabbi"	Traditional	Aditya Dev	Altamash Faridi, Kamaal Khan, Ali Zaidi	5:04
8.	"Tum Hi Aana" (Sad Version)	Kunaal Vermaa	Payal Dev	Jubin Nautiyal	1:23
9.	"Thodi Jagah" (Female Version)	Rashmi Virag	Tanishk Bagchi	Tulsi Kumar	3:36
10.	"Tum Hi Aana" (Duet Version)	Kunaal Vermaa	Payal Dev	Jubin Nautiyal, Dhvani Bhanushali	4:08
11.	"Hasbi Rabbi Naat"	Mumtaz Aziz Naza	Sanjoy Chowdhury	Mujtaba Aziz Naza, Munir Aziz Naza	1:11
12.	"Tum Hi Aana" (Happy Version)	Kunaal Vermaa	Payal Dev	Jubin Nautiyal	2:49
13.	"Peeyu Datt Ke"	Yo Yo Honey Singh, Dope Leo	Yo Yo Honey Singh	Yo Yo Honey Singh, Ritu Pathak	3:48
14.	"Masakali 2.0"	Tanishk Bagchi	Tanishk Bagchi	Sachet Tandon, Tulsi Kumar	2:52
15.	"Kinna Sona (Atif Aslam Version)"	Kumaar	Meet Bros	Atif Aslam	4:31
16.	"Theme Music"		D. Imman	Instrumental	1:08
Total length:					52:18

== Release ==
The film was released on 15 November 2019 after the release date was postponed by a week to accommodate the release of Bala.

== Reception ==
The film received mixed reviews from critics.

Bollywood Hungama have it a rating of 3.5/5 and wrote, "The Sidharth Malhotra Tara Sutaria starrer MARJAAVAAN is a true blue masala entertainer that has the potential to impress its target audience". Khaleej Times rated the film 1.5 stars out of 5 and said, "'Marjaavan' falls several shades short of a proper Bollywood masala entertainer that it aspires to in spite of having all the ingredients for it. The weak and clichéd plotline along with heavy-duty dialogues that should have impressed but end up sounding hollow is only part of the problem."

The Times of India rated the film 2.5 stars out of 5 and reviewed, "Marjaavaan attempts to check all the boxes for an emotional action rollercoaster, but its dated execution doesn't quite make the kill."

Mumbai Mirror rated the film 2 on 5 stars and said, "This Sidharth Malthotra, Riteish Deshmukh and Tara Sutaria-starrer is a tedious watch."

Scroll.in rated the film 2 out of 5 stars and wrote, "A 1980s Bollywood flashback with characters who are cardboard cutouts."

=== Box office ===
Marjaavaan's opening day domestic collection was ₹7.03 crore. On the second day, the film collected ₹7.21 crore. On the third day, the film collected ₹10.18 crore, taking the total opening weekend collection to ₹24.42 crore.

As of 16 December 2019, with a gross of ₹56.88 crore in India and ₹8.46 crore overseas, the film has a worldwide gross collection of ₹65.34 crore.
