= Anushka Shahaney =

Indian singer-songwriter

- Born: Mumbai, India
- Education: Trinity College of Music
- Occupations: Singer, songwriter
- Known for: The Stage (contestant) "Stay a Little Longer with Me" "Lost Without You" "Something in Common" "Ecstasy" "Woman Like Me" "Hear Me"

Anushka Shahaney is an Indian singer-songwriter who has written and sung "Lost Without You" (written also) and "Stay a Little Longer with Me" in the 2017 film Half Girlfriend, both of the songs were picturised on Shraddha Kapoor and gained popularity.

== Early life ==
Shahaney hails from Mumbai and trained in Western classical music from Trinity College of Music and is training in Indian classical singing.

== Career ==
She participated in the first season of the TV show The Stage and made it to the final. She received praises by the panel of judges. Later, she was given a chance by director Mohit Suri for his film Half Girlfriend. Both the songs "Stay a Little Longer with Me" and "Lost Without You" from Half Girlfriend did very well. Mohit Suri praised her quoting, "I look forward to work with her again soon. She's constantly evolving as an artist and I think she has a very promising career ahead of her".

== Filmography ==
=== Playback singer ===
Year	Film	Song	Singer(s)	Lyrics	Composer
2017	Half Girlfriend	"Lost Without You"	Ami Mishra & Anushka Shahaney	Kunaal Vermaa & Anushka Shahaney	Ami Mishra
2017	Half Girlfriend	"Stay a Little Longer with Me"	Anushka Shahaney	Anushka Shahaney & Ishita Moitra	Farhan Saeed

== Awards ==
Year	Award	Song	Film	Result
2018	Mirchi Music Award for Upcoming Female Vocalist of The Year	"Stay a Little Longer with Me"	Half Girlfriend	Nominated
