= Mirchi Music Award for Male Vocalist of The Year =

Annual Hindi music award

The Mirchi Music Award for Male Vocalist of The Year is given yearly by Radio Mirchi as a part of its annual Mirchi Music Awards for Hindi films, to recognise a male vocalist who has delivered an outstanding performance in a film song.

== Superlatives ==
Superlative	Singer	Record
Most awards	Arijit Singh	7
Most nominations	Arijit Singh	27
Most nominations without ever winning	Shankar Mahadevan	4
Most nominations in a single year	Arijit Singh	4 (2016,2017,2023)

== List of winners ==
- 2009 Javed Ali - "Jashn-E-Bahaara" from Jodhaa Akbar
  - Karthik - "Behka" from Ghajini
  - Javed Ali - "Guzarish" from Ghajini
  - Rashid Ali - "Kabhi Kabhi Aditi" from Jaane Tu... Ya Jaane Na
  - KK - "Khuda Jaane" from Bachna Ae Haseeno
  - A.R Rahman - "Khwaja" from Jodhaa Akbar
- 2010 Mohit Chauhan - "Masakali" from Delhi-6
  - Shankar Mahadevan - "Sapnon Se Bhare Naina" from Luck By Chance
  - Javed Ali & Kailash Kher - "Arziyan" from Delhi-6
  - Rahat Fateh Ali Khan - "Ajj Din Chadheya" from Love Aaj Kal
  - Shankar Mahadevan - "Tere Naina" from Chandni Chowk To China
- 2011 Rahat Fateh Ali Khan - "Tere Mast Mast Do Nain" from Dabangg
  - Rahat Fateh Ali Khan & Shankar Mahadevan - "Sajdaa" - My Name is Khan
  - Mohit Chauhan - "Pee Loon" from Once Upon A Time In Mumbai
  - Aadesh Shrivastava - "Mora Piya" from Raajneeti
  - Shankar Mahadevan - "Uff Teri Adaa" from Karthik Calling Karthik
- 2012 Kamal Khan - "Ishq Sufiyana" from The Dirty Picture
  - Hans Raj Hans - "Ik Tu Hi Tu Hi" from Mausam
  - Mohit Chauhan - "Nadaan Parinde" from Rockstar
  - Mohit Chauhan - "Sadda Haq" from Rockstar
  - Rahat Fateh Ali Khan - "Teri Meri" from Bodyguard
- 2013 Sonu Nigam - "Abhi Mujh Mein Kahin" from Agneepath
  - Roop Kumar Rathod - "O Saiyyan" from Agneepath
  - Rabbi Shergill - "Challa" from Jab Tak Hai Jaan
  - Vishal Dadlani - "Jee Le Zaara" from Talaash
  - Ayushmann Khurrana - "Pani Da Rang" from Vicky Donor
- 2014 Arijit Singh - "Tum Hi Ho" from Aashiqui 2
  - Benny Dayal - "Badtameez Dil" from Yeh Jawaani Hai Deewani
  - Ankit Tiwari - "Sunn Raha Hai" from Aashiqui 2
  - Siddharth Mahadevan - "Zinda" from Bhaag Milkha Bhaag
  - Javed Bashir - "O Rangrez" from Bhaag Milkha Bhaag
- 2015 Arijit Singh - "Samjhawan" from Humpty Sharma Ki Dulhania
  - Arijit Singh - "Muskurane" from City Lights
  - Arijit Singh - "Manwa Laage" from Happy New Year
  - Ankit Tiwari - "Galliyan" from Ek Villain
  - Vishal Dadlani - "Tu Meri" from Bang Bang!
- 2016 Papon - "Moh Moh Ke Dhaage" from Dum Laga Ke Haisha
  - Arijit Singh - "Sooraj Dooba Hai" from Roy
  - Arijit Singh - "Gerua" from Dilwale
  - Arijit Singh - "Aayat" from Bajirao Mastani
  - Arijit Singh - "Chunar" from ABCD 2
- 2017 Arijit Singh - "Ae Dil Hai Mushkil" from Ae Dil Hai Mushkil
  - Arijit Singh - "Channa Mereya" from Ae Dil Hai Mushkil
  - Arijit Singh - "Nashe Si Chadh Gayi" from Befikre
  - Arijit Singh - "Bolna" from Kapoor & Sons
  - Amit Mishra - "Bulleya" from Ae Dil Hai Mushkil
  - Rahat Fateh Ali Khan - "Jag Ghoomeya" - Sultan
- 2018 Arijit Singh - "Hawayein" from Jab Harry Met Sejal
  - Arijit Singh - "Phir Bhi Tumko Chaahunga" from Half Girlfriend
  - Arijit Singh - "Roke Na Ruke Naina" from Badrinath Ki Dulhania
  - Ash King - "Baarish" from Half Girlfriend
  - Rahat Fateh Ali Khan - "Mere Rashke Qamar" - Baadshaho
- 2019 Shivam Pathak - "EK Dil Ek Jaan" from Padmaavat
  - Shail Hada & Shivam Pathak - "Khalibali" from Padmaavat
  - Ajay Gogavale - "Dhahdak" from Dhadak
  - Arijit Singh - "Binte Dil" from Padmaavat
  - Arijit Singh - "Ae Watan" from Raazi
- 2020 Arijit Singh - "Kalank" from Kalank
  - Arijit Singh - "Tujhe Kitna Chahne Lage" from Kabir Singh
  - Ranveer Singh & Divine - "Apna TIme Ayega" from Gully Boy
  - B Praak - "Teri Mitti" from Kesari
  - Romy, Vivek Hariharan, Shashwat Sachdev - "Challa" from Uri: The Surgical Strike
- 2022 Javed Ali - "Srivalli" from Pushpa: The Rise
  - Haricharan Seshadri - "Tere Rang" from Atrangi Re
  - Arijit Singh - "Tumhein Mohabbat" from Atrangi Re
  - Arijit Singh - "Aabaad Barbaad" from Ludo
  - Jubin Nautiyal - "Raataan Lambiyan" from Shershaah
- 2023 Arijit Singh - "Kesariya" from Brahmāstra: Part One – Shiva
  - Arijit Singh - "Rasiya Reprise" from Brahmāstra: Part One – Shiva
  - Arijit Singh - "Phir Na Aisi Raat Ayegi" from Laal Singh Chaddha
  - Arijit Singh, Altamash Faridi, Shadab Faridi - "Tur Kalleyan" from Laal Singh Chaddha
  - Mohan Kannan - "Kahani" from Laal Singh Chaddha
- 2024 Arijit Singh - "Satranga" from Animal
  - Arijit Singh - "O Bedardeya" from Tu Jhoothi Main Makkaar
  - Vishal Mishra - "Pehle Bhi Main" from Animal
  - Sachet Tandon - "Kudmayi" from Rocky Aur Rani Kii Prem Kahaani
  - Varun Jain, Sachin-Jigar, Altamash Faridi, Shadab Faridi - "Tere Vaaste" from Zara Hatke Zara Bachke

== See also ==
- Mirchi Music Awards
