= Ami Mishra =

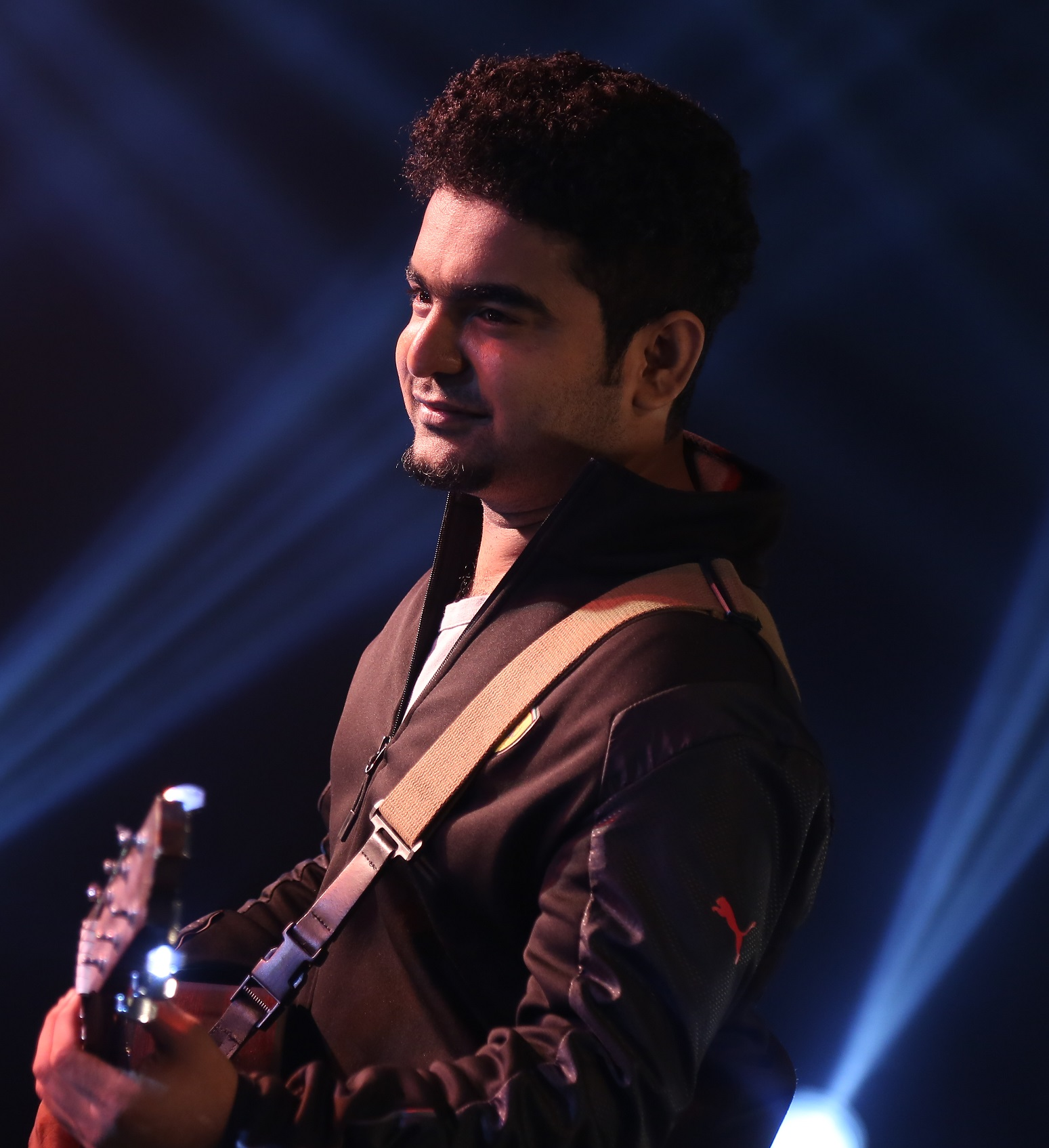
- Ami performing at a gig in June 2017

Background information
- Born: Mandla, Madhya Pradesh, India
- Genres: Filmi; Indi-Pop/Rock
- Occupations: Playback singer, singer-songwriter
- Instruments: Vocals, guitar, playback singing
- Years active: 2015–present
- Website: amimishra.com

Ami Mishra is an Indian singer-songwriter and playback singer from Mandla, Madhya Pradesh. He composed the song Hasi for the film Hamari Adhuri Kahani. Along with bollywood projects, he is also engaged in making independent music.

== Early life ==
Ami was born in Mandla, Madhya Pradesh to a middle-class family. He has been brought up in different cities wherever his father was posted who is a government employee, his mother is a housewife and he has a younger brother. Ami did his schooling from Saraswati Higher Secondary School, Seoni and graduation from Rani Durgawati Post Graduation College, Mandla. After the graduation, he went to Indore for the post graduation and his passion for music developed there. He had a band in college and with his band he started participating in reality shows. Since then, he has had a keen interest in music.

== Career ==
After completing the MBA from Indore Management Institute, Ami started working at a multinational company in Indore. He worked there for some time but he found the corporate life boring and decided to make a career in music. He quit his job and started playing at restaurants and private parties. Although his parents were not happy with it but he continued pursuing his passion and he moved to Mumbai in 2014. After a struggle of seven months, he got a phone call from Vishesh Films that his song has been selected for a film. Ami made his debut with this song Hasi from the film Hamari Adhuri Kahani which's been directed by Mohit Suri. His latest song is Lost Without You from the film Half Girlfriend.

== Discography ==
Year	Album(s)	Song	Singer(s)	Lyricist(s)	Composer(s)	Notes
2020	Bin Puche Ajana - Single	Bin Puche Ajana	Ami Mishra	Kunaal Vermaa	Ami Mishra	Single
2015	Hamari Adhuri Kahani	Hasi	Ami Mishra	Kunaal Vermaa	Ami Mishra	
2015	Hamari Adhuri Kahani	Hasi (Female)	Shreya Ghoshal	Kunaal Vermaa	Ami Mishra	
2017	Hamari Adhuri Kahani	Hasi (Unplugged)	Ami Mishra	Kunaal Vermaa	Ami Mishra	MTV Unplugged S05
2017	Half Girlfriend	Lost Without You	Ami Mishra & Anushka Shahaney	Kunaal Vermaa & Anushka Shahaney	Ami Mishra	
2017	Half Girlfriend	Manzoor Hai (Unplugged of Lost Without You)	Ami Mishra	Kunaal Vermaa	Ami Mishra	Zee Music Special

== Awards ==
- Won 6th GiMA Awards – GiMA Award for Best Music Debut – "Hasi" (Hamari Adhuri Kahani)
- Nominated 8th Mirchi Music Awards – Upcoming male vocalist of the year – "Hasi" (Hamari Adhuri Kahani)
- Nominated 8th Mirchi Music Awards – Upcoming Music Composer of The Year – "Hasi (Male)"(Hamari Adhuri Kahani)
