= Phir Bhi Tumko Chaahunga =

Song performed by Mithoon

- Cover of the song, featuring actors Arjun Kapoor and Shraddha Kapoor

Song by Mithoon featuring Arijit Singh, Shashaa Tirupati, Shraddha Kapoor

from the album Half Girlfriend
- Language: Hindi
- English title: "I Will Still Love You"
- Written: 2001 (lyrics)
- Released: 18 April 2017
- Genre: Nazm . R&B
- Length: 5:52
- Label: Zee Music
- Composer: Mithoon
- Lyricist: Manoj Muntashir

Music video
- "Phir Bhi Tumko Chaahunga" on YouTube

"Phir Bhi Tumko Chaahunga" (transl. I will still love you) is a song from the 2017 Hindi film Half Girlfriend. Picturised on Arjun Kapoor and Shraddha Kapoor, the song has been sung by Arijit Singh and Shashaa Tirupati. The music of the song is composed by Mithoon and the lyrics are penned by Manoj Muntashir. The track has over 1 Billion views on YouTube as of September 2024. Reprise version of the track is sung by Arijit Singh titled, "Pal Bhar (Chaahunga Reprise)", and also another female version titled, "Phir Bhi Tumko Chaahungi" is sung by Shraddha Kapoor along with the instrumental "Half Girlfriend (Love Theme)".

== Background ==
The song was written in Nazm style in 2001 by the writer Manoj Muntashir, while he was working for the TV show Yatra. Muntashir wrote the Nazm in his diary at Dal Lake in Kashmir while thinking of his wife. The song was then forgotten for years until music composer Ankit Tiwari heard about it and insisted that he use it. Muntashir was hesitant to use it in films, but later submitted on the insistence of film director Mohit Suri. As Mohit Suri believed if produced properly the song would be a "Historical". According to Muntashir, "Mohit told Mithoon to compose the music and it was beautiful. The credit has to go to Mithoon for bringing it to Mohit's notice."

== Pre-release ==
The track registered over 4 million views through unofficial versions and remixes, even before the song's official release. Muntashir said, ‛he can't believe how much of an impact just two lines of the song have created.’

== Reception ==
India Today wrote that "Phir Bhi Tumko Chaahunga" is "sung in the soulful voice of Arijit Singh" and that it "has romance written all over it. The song beautifully puts across feeling of unconditional love" The Times of India's Pratibha D. wrote, "Arijit Singh weaves magic yet again. The music for the movie is given by renowned music composer Mithoon, whose romantic touch in tracks just takes you into another world." NDTV wrote, "'Phir Bhi Tumko Chahunga' is a soulful rendition by Arijit Singh."

Writer of the song Manoj Muntashir said, "I would like to mention, Mithoon has done what i always thought was impossible. Without changing one word from the original poetry, he made a tune India is shedding tears and spilling cans of beer over. It's a craze because of Mithoon's genius." Director of the film Mohit Suri said, "I'm taken aback by the quantum of love and the amount of anticipation around the song. As my reciprocation I would like to present the song to my audiences sooner than scheduled. Mithoon, Arijit, and me are overwhelmed by all the love."

Radioandmusic.com wrote "'Phir Bhi Tumko Chaahunga' features soulful vocals by Arijit Singh, which will surely soothe the soul. Revealing just a small verse of the song, was enough for music lovers and the singer's fans to start to love it. The song was an instant hit among the audiences and fans and music lovers have already made several covers of the song, which seem to have gone viral already. Following this, the makers have decided to treat their fans by preponing the song release and give out the full original track."

== Accolades ==
Year	Award Ceremony	Category	Recipient	Result	Reference(s)
2018	10th Mirchi Music Awards	Listeners' Choice Song of The Year	Manoj Muntashir, Mithoon, Arijit Singh and Shashaa Tirupati	Won	
2018	10th Mirchi Music Awards	Male Vocalist of The Year	Arijit Singh	Nominated	
2018	10th Mirchi Music Awards	Music Composer of The Year	Mithoon	Nominated	
