= Gorakh Sharma =

Indian guitarist (born 1946)

Gorakh Sharma गोरख शर्मा
- Born: 28 December 1946; Mumbai, Central India Agency, British India
- Died: 26 January 2018 (aged 71) Mumbai, Maharashtra, India
- Genres: Hindi Film Music
- Occupations: Musician, assistant music director
- Instruments: Guitar, Bass, Mandolin, Rubab, Mandola
- Years active: 1960–2017

Gorakh Sharma (28 December 1946 – 26 January 2018) was an Indian guitarist who is well known for his work in the Indian film industry and who is also one of the first bass guitarists in the industry. He is the younger brother of Pyarelal Sharma of the famed music duo Laxmikant-Pyarelal. During his entire music career that spanned from 1960 to 2002 he has played various string instruments in more than a 1000 songs and over 500 films. He was the lead guitarist for Laxmikant Pyarelal and also worked as assistant music composer with them along with Sashikant (Laxmikant brother)

== Early life ==
Gorakh Ramprasad Sharma (born 28 December 1946) is the son of a renowned trumpeter Pandit Ramprasad Sharma (popularly known as Babaji), who taught him the basics of music. He mastered the art of reading music notations from Babaji and the art of playing various string instruments. He has played the mandolin, mandola, rubab and numerous types of guitars like the acoustic, jazz, twelve string, and the electric guitar. He was the first to have played the Bass guitar in the Indian film industry. He is younger brother of Pyarelal (Laxmikant–Pyarelal Duo)

== Early career ==
Gorakh Sharma started his musical career as a mandolin player. He learnt Indian notations from his father Pandit Ramprasad Sharma. It was during this time that English instruments like the Guitar were also gaining popularity. He went on to learn the Guitar from Anibal Castro, who was a known guitarist and went on to be trained guitarist. His mandolin playing abilities merged with the guitar playing skills made him a unique guitarist. Initially he was a part of the group Baal Sureel Kala Kendra which would go to smaller cities and perform. The "Baal Sureel Kala Kendra", a musical group, would go to small cities like Pune Solapur, Kolhapur etc. and perform in shows. The group consisted of Meena Mangeshkar, Usha Mangeshkar, Hridaynath Mangeshkar, along with Laxmikant Kudalkar, his brothers Pyarelal, Ganesh, Anand, and others.

== Later career ==
In the 1960s when Laxmikant Kudalkar decided to focus on making film music, Gorakh Sharma got the opportunity to play the Mandolin. At the young age of 14 he got the opportunity to work with music director Ravi and played the mandolin in the song Chaudhvin Ka Chaand. As a guitarist he played fillers, Solo's and Rhythm in more than a 500 films and soon started working with music directors like Ravi, Shankar-Jaikishen, Kalyanji Anandji. He was promoted to the role of an assistant music director for Laxmikant Pyarelal and worked with them in 475 films since 1966. His unique style of playing got him accolades in the industry and has been a member of the Cine Musicians Association (CMA). At a time when the musicians were paid on the basis of a grade given by the CMA, he along with Pandit Shivkumar Sharma and Pandit Hariprasad Chaurasia were the only musicians who were give the top grade rating.

=== Selected works ===
Song	Film	Music director	Year
Chaudhvin Ka Chand Ho	Chaudhvin Ka Chand	Ravi	1960
Mere Mehboob Qayamat Hogi	Mr. X in Bombay	Laxmikant Pyarelal	1964
Nazar Na Lag Jaye	Night in London	Laxmikant Pyarelal	1967
Dum Maro Dum	Hare Rama Hare Krishna	R D Burman	1973
Main Shayar Toh Nahin	Bobby	Laxmikant Pyarelal	1973
Ruk Jaana Nahin	Imtihan	Laxmikant Pyarelal	1974
Aao Yaaron Gao	Hawas	Usha Khanna	1974
Dafliwale	Sargam	Laxmikant Pyarelal	1979
Ek Hasina Thi	Karz	Laxmikant Pyarelal	1980
Hum Bane Tum Bane	Ek Duuje Ke Liye	Laxmikant Pyarelal	1981
Saason Ki Zaroorat Hain Jaise	Aashiqui	Nadeem Shravan	1990
Jao Tum Chahe Jahan	Narshimha	Laxmikant Pyarelal	1991
Sanam Mere Sanam	Hum	Laxmikant Pyarelal	1991
Jaadoo Teri Nazar	Darr	Shiv-Hari	1993
