= Zee Cine Award for Best Track of the Year =

Annual film award in India

Zee Cine Award for Best Track of the Year is chosen from public-opinion poll, and the song is declared a winner at the actual ceremony. This category was first founded in 2004 and it is considered a prestigious award for a particular song of the film to win. In 2011, the category was renamed Zee Cine Award for Viewer's Choice Song of the Year.

== Multiple wins ==
Wins	Recipient
4	Pritam
2	Shankar–Ehsaan–Loy, Vishal–Shekhar, Tanishk Bagchi

== Winners ==
The chosen songs are listed below:-

Year	Composer	Song	Film
2004	Shankar–Ehsaan–Loy	"Kal Ho Naa Ho"	Kal Ho Naa Ho
2005	Pritam	"Dhoom Machale"	Dhoom
2006	Shankar–Ehsaan–Loy	"Kajra Re"	Bunty Aur Babli
2007	Vishal Bhardwaj	"Beedi"	Omkara
2008	Pritam	"Mauja Hi Mauja"	Jab We Met
2009	Not Held in 2009		
2010	Not Held in 2010		
2011	Lalit Pandit	"Munni Badnaam Hui"	Dabangg
2012	Vishal–Shekhar	"Chammak Challo"	Ra.One
2013	Vishal–Shekhar	"Radha"	Student of the Year
2014	Mithoon	"Tum Hi Ho"	Aashiqui 2
2015	Amit Trivedi	"London Thumakda"	Queen
2016	Himesh Reshammiya	"Prem Ratan Dhan Payo"	Prem Ratan Dhan Payo
2017	Pritam	"Channa Mereya"	Ae Dil Hai Mushkil
2018	Tanishk Bagchi	"Baarish"	Half Girlfriend
2019	Tanishk Bagchi	"Aankh Maarey"	Simmba
2020	Divine, Ankur Tewari	"Aapna Time Aayega"	Gully Boy
2023	Pritam	"Kesariya"	Brahmāstra: Part One – Shiva
2024	Mithoon, Uttam Singh	"Main Nikla Gaddi Leke"	Gadar 2
2025	Sachin–Jigar	"Aaj Ki Raat"	Stree 2
2026	Rishabh Kant	"Barbaad"	Saiyaara

== See also ==
- Bollywood
- Cinema of India
