= Thodi Der =

2017 song by Shreya Ghoshal and Farhan Saeed

Song by Farhan Saeed and Shreya Ghoshal
- Language: Hindustani
- Released: 25 April 2017
- Recorded: Phatbox Recording Studio, Mumbai
- Genre: Filmi
- Label: Zee Music Company
- Composer: Farhan Saeed
- Lyricist: Kumaar

Music video
- "Thodi Der" on YouTube

"Thodi Der" (transl. Stay a Little Longer) is a popular song from the soundtrack of the Bollywood film Half Girlfriend. The song was composed by Pakistani singer Farhan Saeed, who originally performed the song "Tu Thodi Dair") with Indian singer Shreya Ghoshal.

== Background ==
The version heard in Half Girlfriend is revamped from an earlier tune by Pakistani singer Farhan Saeed, while he was with the band Jal. It was originally composed in Punjabi. In the movie, an English-dubbed version, "Stay a Little Longer", is performed by Anushka Shahaneya.

== Release and lyrics ==
The song was released on 25 April 2017 and Half Girlfriend came out on 19 May 2017.

The original version, sung by Farhan Saeed, received an overwhelming response from the public, with the music video on YouTube garnering four million views in a single day. As of June 2017, the song's music video has garnered 23 million views.

The version sung in Half Girlfriend reached 50 million views as of September 2017.

The song has been viewed more than 222 million times on YouTube as of February 2023.

== Personnel ==
Farhan Saeed

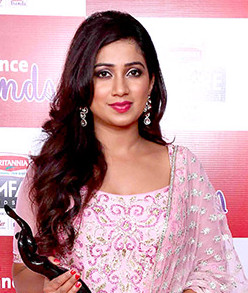
Shreya Ghoshal

- Farhan Saeed and Shreya Ghoshal – vocals
- Ali Mustafa – keyboards
- Ankur Mukherjee – guitar
- Aditya Oke – harmonium
- Murad Ali Khan – sarangi
- Farhan Saeed – music
- Kumaar – lyrics
- Dj Phukan – arrangements and programming
- Assista Madhab Deka – co-arrangements
- Pankaj Borah and Bhaskar Sarma – engineering
- Eric Pillai (Future Sound of Bombay) – mixing and mastering
- Michael Edwin Pillai and Lucky. – assistant mixing

== Critical reception ==
Critics generally gave "Thodi Der" positive reviews, describing the song as "soulful", with one reviewer stating that "Shraddha Kapoor and Arjun Kapoor’s chemistry does full justice to the latest track"

India.com described the song as "extremely soothing", and "the sarangi played by Murad Ali Khan adds to the charm of the song" The English version, "Stay a Little Longer", was described as "a combination of western and Indian music."

In a critique of the song, News18 did not comment on the song itself, but described it as an insensitive production of Bollywood, questioning why the two instruments of the tabla and dafli were included in the video without seeming to be played, and pointing out the music video as being shot in front of Humayun's tomb in Delhi.

== Accolades ==
Year	Award	Nominee	Category	Result	Ref.
2018	Screen Awards	Shreya Ghoshal	Best Female Playback Singer	Nominated	
2018	Zee Cine Awards	Shreya Ghoshal	Best Female Playback Singer	Nominated	
2018	Filmfare Awards	Shreya Ghoshal	Best Female Playback Singer	Nominated	
2018	Mirchi Music Awards	Shreya Ghoshal	Female Vocalist of the Year	Won	
2018	Sony Mix Audience Music Awards	Shreya Ghoshal	Best Female Playback Singer	Won	
