= Jubin Nautiyal =

Indian playback singer (born 1989)

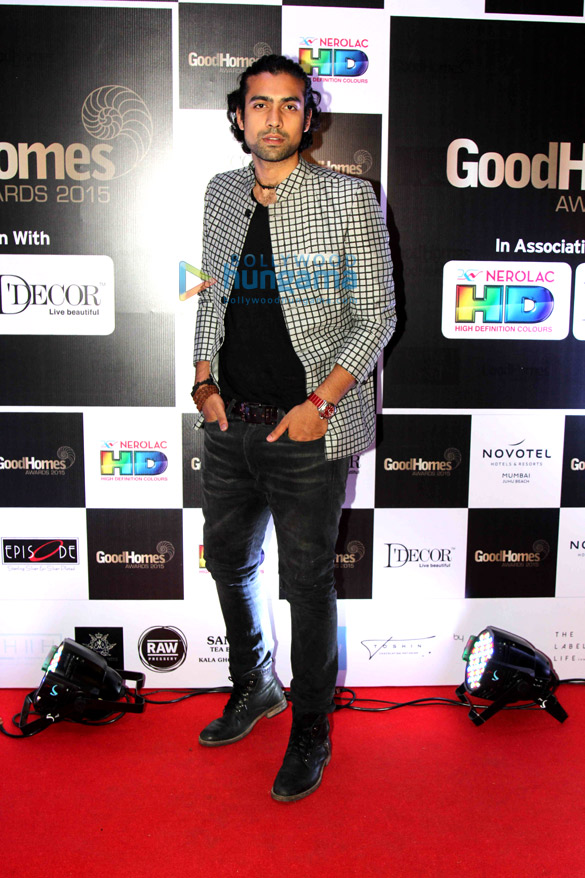
- Nautiyal at the Good Homes Awards 2015

Background information
- Born: 14 June 1989 (age 37); Dehradun, Uttar Pradesh present in Uttarakhand, India
- Genres: Indian classical; pop; rock; EDM
- Occupations: Singer; actor; music composer; lyricist
- Instruments: Vocals; guitar
- Years active: 2014–present
- Labels: T-Series; Zee Music Company; Sony Music India; Tips; Saregama Music; YRF Music; Jubin Nautiyal (As Music Label); etc.

Jubin Nautiyal (born 14 June 1989) is an Indian playback singer. In June 2022, he won the IIFA award for "Playback Singer (Male)" for the song "Raataan Lambiyan" from Shershaah and "Upcoming Male Vocalist of the Year" at 8th Mirchi Music Awards for his song "Zindagi Kuch Toh Bata (Reprise)" from Bajrangi Bhaijaan. He also won the Rising Musical Star Award at Zee Business Awards. He has since recorded songs for films in various Indian languages, predominantly Hindi. He is signed on by T-Series.

== Early and personal life ==
Jubin Nautiyal was born on 14 June 1989 in Dehradun, Uttarakhand, India to the Sarola Nautiyal family, basically from Jaunsar, culturally part of Mahasu region. His father, Ram Sharan Nautiyal, is a businessman and politician in Uttarakhand and his mother, Neena Nautiyal, is a businesswoman. He showed an inclination towards music at an early age of four, taking after his father's love for singing. He did his schooling up to eighth grade from St. Joseph's Academy, Dehradun. Thereafter, he continued his schooling at Welham Boys' School, Dehradun, where he formally studied music as a subject and built a base in classical music. He also learnt playing instruments like guitar, piano, harmonium, and drums. By the age of 18, Nautiyal was well known as a singer in his hometown of Dehradun. He performed live at many events and donated to charities.

== Career ==
In 2011, Nautiyal participated in the television music reality show X Factor where he went up to being in the top 25 participants.

He made his debut in the Indian music industry with the song "Ek Mulakat" from the film Sonali Cable (2014). He also sang 'Meherbani' for The Shaukeens in the same year. In 2015, he sang 'Zindagi' for Bajrangi Bhaijaan, 'Bandeyaa' for Jazbaa, 'Tu Itni Khoobsurat Hain Reloaded' for Barkhaa and 'Samandar' with Shreya Ghoshal for Kis Kisko Pyaar Karoon.

He made his Telugu debut in the film Sarrainodu under the music direction of S. Thaman and Bengali debut in the film Aashiqui.

In 2016, Nautiyal performed on MTV Unplugged Season 5 and sang Dahleez's track "Jiya Re". He worked with composer duo Sachin–Jigar for the title track of series Ek Duje Ke Vaaste and Amit Trivedi for the film Fitoor where he lent his voice for "Tere Liye" along with Sunidhi Chauhan. He also worked with composer Nadeem Saifi for the title track of Ishq Forever and also sang two songs for Kuch Kuch Locha Hai under them. He also collaborated with JAM8's Kaushik and Akash for "Gumnaam Hai Koi" for the film 1920 London. His songs "Le Chala" for One Night Stand and "The Sound of Raaz" and "Yaad Hai Na (Reprise)" for Raaz Reboot gave him an opportunity to work with composer Jeet Gannguli and this collaboration continued till "Dhal Jaun Main" for Rustom.

In 2017, he was the lead singer for the film Kaabil which had music by Rajesh Roshan, and also sang "The Humma Song" for Dharma Productions's film Ok Jaanu. He released a Hindi pop song along with Pawni Pandey named 'Dil Budhhu' on T-Series He sang for Raabta, Tubelight, Commando 2, and Machine. He sang 'Banwra Mann' for Jolly LLB 2, 'Socha Hai' Remake for Baadshaho and 'Raat Baaki' Remake for Ittefaq. He also sang the title track of Star Plus series Tu Sooraj, Main Saanjh Piyaji with Palak Muchhal and for Star Parivaar Awards 2017. In 2018, he sang 'Gazab Ka Hai Din Remake' with Prakriti Kakar for Dil Juunglee, and 'Boond Boond' with Neeti Mohan for the film Hate Story 4. For the same film, he also sang 'Tum Mere Ho' with Amrita Singh under Mithoon's composition. This was also his first collaboration with Mithoon following Baaghi 2. He also sang 'Pehla Nasha Once Again' with Palak Muchhal for Kuchh Bheege Alfaaz.

In 2019, his songs 'Tujhe Kitna Chahein Aur Hum' from Kabir Singh, "Tum Hi Aana" and "Kinna Sona" from Marjaavaan became chartbusters.

Nautiyal and music composer Mithoon teamed up again for 'Toh Aagaye Hum'. He also released a new song 'Main Jis Din Bhula Du' along with Tulsi Kumar. In 2021, his new song 'Lut Gaye' featuring Emraan Hashmi and Yukti Thareja hit more than 915 million views on YouTube. His next song "Bedardi Se Pyaar Ka" hit 55 Million Views in just 13 days. This music of Tanishk Bagchi is sung by Nautiyal and Asees Kaur was published by T-Series. Nautiyal's next song, "Barsaat Ki Dhun", was released on 20 July 2021 featuring Karishma Sharma and Gurumeet Choudhary in the music video.

In January 2022, his song "O Aasamanwale" was released by T-Series (company). It was an album of a musical love song in which Nautiyal was onscreen with the artist Neha Khan. The song was written by Manoj Muntashir and composed by Rochak Kohli.

On 1 February 2022, "Tumse Pyaar Karke" was released by T-Series (company) featuring Gurmeet Choudhary and Ihana Dhillon. This is the music of Payal Dev and sung by Tulsi Kumar and Nautiyal.

He also sang "Manike" with Yohani in 2022 for the comedy film "Thank God", which was released on 25 October 2022. Shiv Kailasho Ke Vasi is a devotional song dedicated to Lord Shiva, sung by Jubin Nautiyal and released in 2025.

== Accolades ==
Year	Award Ceremony	Category	Descriptions
2015	Zee Business Awards	Rising Musical Star Award	
2016	Mirchi Music Awards	Upcoming Male Vocalist of The Year	Zindagi Kuch Toh Bata (from "Bajrangi Bhaijaan")
2017	ITA Awards	Best Singer	Tu Sooraj Main Saanjh, Piyaji (Title Track)
2017	Dadasaheb Phalke Excellence Awards	Best Male Playback Singer	Kaabil Hoon (from "Kaabil")
2020	YouTube Creator Awards	Gold Creator Award	Official YouTube Channel milestone
2022	IIFA Awards	Best Male Playback Singer	Raataan Lambiyan (from "Shershaah")
2022	Mirchi Music Awards	Listener's Choice Independent Music	"Lut Gaye"
2023	BollywoodLife.com Awards	Best Musician on YouTube	
2025	IIFA Awards	Best Male Playback Singer	Dua (from "Article 370")

== See also ==
- List of Indian playback singers
