= Half Girlfriend (film) =

2017 Indian film by Mohit Suri

- Theatrical release poster
- Directed by: Mohit Suri
- Written by: Chetan Bhagat Screenplay: Chetan Bhagat; Dialogues: Ishita Moitra
- Story by: Chetan Bhagat
- Based on: Half Girlfriend by Chetan Bhagat
- Produced by: Shobha Kapoor; Ekta Kapoor; Mohit Suri; Chetan Bhagat
- Starring: Shraddha Kapoor; Arjun Kapoor; Seema Biswas; Vikrant Massey
- Cinematography: Vishnu Rao
- Edited by: Devendra Murdeshwar
- Music by: Score: Raju Singh; Songs: Mithoon; Tanishk Bagchi; Rishi Rich; Farhan Saeed; Ami Mishra; Rahul Mishra
- Production companies: Balaji Motion Pictures; Chetan Bhagat Entertainment; ALT Entertainment
- Distributed by: NH Studioz; Coconut Movies (India); Zee Studios (Overseas)
- Release date: 19 May 2017
- Running time: 130 minutes
- Country: India
- Language: Hindi
- Budget: ₹58 crore
- Box office: ₹97.7 crore

Half Girlfriend is a 2017 Indian Hindi-language romantic drama film based on the novel of the same name written by Chetan Bhagat. The film is directed by Mohit Suri and stars Shraddha Kapoor and Arjun Kapoor in lead roles. The film also places Vikrant Massey and Rhea Chakraborty in pivotal roles.

Principal photography commenced in June 2016 and filming locations include Delhi, Mumbai, Patna, Dumraon, Varanasi, New York City and Cape Town. The film was released worldwide on 19 May 2017. Upon release, the movie received mixed-to-negative reviews upon release, with praise for its soundtrack, visuals, and a few supporting performances; but criticism towards its implausible story, weak screenplay, clichéd plot twists, dialogues, and unconvincing lead acting. Despite the criticism, it performed moderately well at the box office.

== Plot ==
Madhav Jha is a good basketball player who cannot speak English well. He gets accepted into St Stephen's College, Delhi, based on a sports quota, where he meets Riya Somani, an upper-class young girl who is allowed temporary admission based on a sports quota. They become good friends and play basketball every evening. When Madhav tells his roommate, Shailesh, and friends about Riya, they push him to ask Riya out for a date, but she refuses and asks him just to be a friend. Madhav's friends still encourage him to pursue Riya in the hopes that she will eventually date him.

One night, Madhav and Riya hang out together. Madhav picks her up from her house, and after spending the evening together, when she returns home, she kisses Madhav before entering her house.

When Madhav attends Riya's birthday, he questions her about the nature of their relationship. Uncomfortable, Riya says that she is not his girlfriend, but they can maybe reach a compromise since they have reached halfway, and she offers to be his "half girlfriend." One afternoon after a game, Madhav asks Riya if she would like to rest in his room in a boys-only dorm, where (goaded by his peers and feeling humiliated by Riya's uncertainty), Madhav tries to force himself upon Riya. Upset and hurt, a few days later, Riya tells Madhav that she is leaving college and getting married. Madhav tries to stop her, but she leaves.

After completing college, Madhav goes back to his village, where his mother runs a school where only boys study because there are no girls' toilets. Madhav learns that Bill Gates is coming to Patna and will be funding grants to schools. Madhav decides to apply for a grant, for which he goes to the Chanakya hotel in Patna.

After the meeting, Madhav meets Riya, who is living in the hotel and works for CloseUp. They hang out for some time, and Madhav learns that Riya has divorced because her husband and his mother tried to beat her. As Madhav needs to give a speech in English for Bill Gates, Riya helps him prepare for it. At the time of preparing Madhav for the speech in English, Riya falls in love with Madhav, which she does not tell him till the end. One day, he takes her to his house, where Madhav's mother asks her about her marriage. She acts rudely after discovering that she is a divorcee. A few days before the speech, when Riya has to go back to Patna, Madhav's mother asks her to stay away from Madhav. She, however, attends Madhav's speech, where he is successful in getting a grant from the Bill Gates Foundation. After the speech ends, a young girl from the school hands a letter from Riya to Madhav. The letter says that Riya has been diagnosed with blood cancer and will die in three months. She requests him not to search for her, as she herself does not know where she will go. Madhav is seen going to Riya's house to deliver her belongings to her mother, who starts crying on learning about Riya's disease. Madhav recalls that she wanted to become a singer at a bar in New York. Unprepared, Madhav goes to New York to visit his friend Shailesh.

Shailesh and his wife, Rutvi, learn about the incident and try to divert Madhav's attention from Riya. Rutvi tries to set him up with Anshika, her friend. They spend some time together. Madhav tries to find Riya for three months continuously, until his time runs out.

On the last day, when he was attending his farewell party, he saw a video where Anshika, who had fallen in love with him, thanked him for being a part of her life. In this video, Madhav sees a blurred picture of Riya singing in a cafe. He runs to the café and finds Riya and understands that she had lied to Madhav about being sick, as his mother didn't want Riya, a divorcee, to be with her son. They reconcile and consummate their relationship.

A few years later, Madhav is seen talking to his mother about opening a new school, and Riya helps their daughter, Tvisha Jha, learn to play basketball, but she is unable to do so. Riya tells her daughter to never give up.

== Cast ==
- Arjun Kapoor as Madhav Jha, a Bihari boy who hardly knows how to speak English and ends up attracted towards Riya Somani and becomes the husband of Riya and Tvisha's father
- Shraddha Kapoor as Riya Somani Jha a rich Delhi girl who comes from an entrepreneur background. A singer, she loves to enjoy her own company and sings at a bar in New York. Later, she becomes Madhav's Wife and Tvisha's mother
- Vikrant Massey as Shailesh Pandey, Madhav's colleague who is protective of him.
- Rhea Chakraborty as Anshika Patel, who loves Madhav but lets him go for Riya.
- Seema Biswas as Rani Sahiba, Madhav's Mother, who runs a school in Bihar.
- Shree Dhar Dubey as Hemant, the estate agent.
- Anisa Butt as Rutvi, Sailesh's Wife
- Jiten Lalwani as Basketball Coach
- Adam Davenport as Bar Owner in New York City, USA
- Dalip Sondhi as Mr. Somani/Riya's Father
- Sujata Sehgal as Mrs. Somani/Riya's Mother
- Tvisha Shah as Tvisha Jha/Daughter of Riya and Madhav
- Kashvi Kothari as Shabnam/a village girl
- Vikas B Mandaliya as Rohan Chandak/Riya's childhood friend and Riya's ex-husband

Additionally, a digitally superimposed likeness of Bill Gates appears in the movie in scenes where he comes to visit Madhav's village in Bihar.

== Production ==
The film went into production in March 2016. Prominent shooting locations included St. Stephen's College in New Delhi and Times Square and the UN Headquarters in New York City. It is the first Bollywood movie to be shot at the UN headquarters. The basketball action in the film is by Rob Miller, NBA and the ReelSports team. Around 200 students from different colleges were roped in to play extras as some of the scenes demand Delhi University students in the film. The trailer was released on 10 April.

== Box office ==
The film was released on 19 May 2017 worldwide alongside Hindi Medium. it collected ₹120 million on its opening day and ₹104 million on the second day. On its first weekend, the total collection was noted as ₹320 million. On its second weekend, the total collection of the film stood at ₹540 million. Its lifetime worldwide gross is estimated to be ₹86–90 crore, with ₹72–77 crore earned domestically and ₹13–14 crore outside India.

== Awards and nominations ==
Date of ceremony	Award	Category	Recipient	Work	Result	Ref.
30 December 2017	Zee Cine Awards	Song of the Year	Tanishk Bagchi	Baarish	Won	
30 December 2017	Zee Cine Awards	Best Playback Singer (Male)	Ash King	Baarish	Nominated	
30 December 2017	Zee Cine Awards	Best Playback Singer (Male)	Arijit Singh	Phir Bhi Tumko Chaahunga	Nominated	
30 December 2017	Zee Cine Awards	Best Lyricist	Manoj Muntashir	Phir Bhi Tumko Chaahunga	Nominated	
30 December 2017	Zee Cine Awards	Best Playback Singer (Female)	Shreya Ghoshal	Thodi Der	Nominated	
30 December 2017	Zee Cine Awards	Best Music Director	Farhan Saeed	Thodi Der	Nominated	
30 December 2017	Zee Cine Awards	Best Music Director	Mithoon	Phir Bhi Tumko Chaahunga	Nominated	
3 December 2017	Star Screen Awards	Best Background Music	Mithoon	The "Love Theme"	Nominated	
20 January 2018	Filmfare Awards	Best Music Album	Various	Music Album	Nominated	
20 January 2018	Filmfare Awards	Best Male Playback Singer	Ash King	Baarish	Nominated	
20 January 2018	Filmfare Awards	Best Female Playback Singer	Shreya Ghoshal	Thodi Der	Nominated	
28 January 2018	Mirchi Music Awards	Female Vocalist of The Year	Shreya Ghoshal	Thodi Der	Won	
28 January 2018	Mirchi Music Awards	Listener's Choice Song of the Year	Mithoon	Phir Bhi Tumko Chaahunga	Won	
28 January 2018	Mirchi Music Awards	Male Vocalist of The Year	Arijit Singh	Phir Bhi Tumko Chaahunga	Nominated	
28 January 2018	Mirchi Music Awards	Male Vocalist of The Year	Ash King	Baarish	Nominated	
28 January 2018	Mirchi Music Awards	Song of The Year	Tanishk Bagchi	Baarish	Nominated	
28 January 2018	Mirchi Music Awards	Lyricist of The Year	Tanishk Bagchi	Baarish	Nominated	
28 January 2018	Mirchi Music Awards	Music Composer of The Year	Tanishk Bagchi	Baarish	Nominated	
28 January 2018	Mirchi Music Awards	Music Composer of The Year	Mithoon	Phir Bhi Tumko Chaahunga	Nominated	
28 January 2018	Mirchi Music Awards	Upcoming Female Vocalist of The Year	Anushka Shahaney	Stay a Little Longer	Nominated	
3 March 2018	Bollywood Journalist Awards	Best Supporting Actor (Male)	Vikrant Massey		Nominated	
3 March 2018	Bollywood Journalist Awards	Best Music Direction	Mithoon	Phir Bhi Tumko Chaahunga	Nominated	
2 May 2018	Mix Music Awards	Best Song	Tanishk Bagchi	Baarish	Won	
2 May 2018	Mix Music Awards	Best Playback Singer (Male)	Ash King	Baarish	Nominated	
2 May 2018	Mix Music Awards	Best Playback Singer (Male)	Arijit Singh	Phir Bhi Tumko Chaahunga	Nominated	
2 May 2018	Mix Music Awards	Best Lyricist	Manoj Muntashir	Phir Bhi Tumko Chaahunga	Won	
2 May 2018	Mix Music Awards	Best Playback Singer (Female)	Shreya Ghoshal	Thodi Der	Won	
5 July 2018	Gaana Users Choice Awards	Best Music Composer	Tanishk Bagchi	Baarish	Nominated	
5 July 2018	Gaana Users Choice Awards	Best Music Composer	Mithoon	Phir Bhi Tumko Chaahunga	Won	
5 July 2018	Gaana Users Choice Awards	Best Playback Singer (Male)	Arijit Singh	Phir Bhi Tumko Chaahunga	Won	
5 July 2018	Gaana Users Choice Awards	Best Playback Singer (Male)	Ash King	Baarish	Nominated	
5 July 2018	Gaana Users Choice Awards	Best Album	Various		Nominated	
