= Kabir Singh (soundtrack) =

2019 soundtrack album

Soundtrack album by Mithoon, Amaal Mallik, Vishal Mishra, Sachet–Parampara and Akhil Sachdeva
- Released: 7 June 2019
- Recorded: 2018–2019
- Genre: Feature film soundtrack
- Length: 42:27
- Language: Hindi
- Label: T-Series
- Producer: Mithoon; Amaal Mallik; Vishal Mishra; Akhil Sachdeva; Sachet–Parampara
External audio
- Official Audio Jukebox on YouTube

Singles from Kabir Singh
- 1. "Bekhayali" Released: 24 May 2019; 2. "Tujhe Kitna Chahne Lage" Released: 31 May 2019

Kabir Singh is the soundtrack to the 2019 film of the same name, directed by Sandeep Reddy Vanga, which is a remake of Vanga's own Telugu film Arjun Reddy (2017), starring Shahid Kapoor and Kiara Advani. Released by T-Series on 7 June 2019, the album consisted nine songs composed by Mithoon, Amaal Mallik, Vishal Mishra, Sachet–Parampara (a duo consisting of Sachet Tandon and Parampara Thakur) and Akhil Sachdeva with lyrics written by Mithoon, Irshad Kamil, Manoj Muntashir and Kumaar. Harshavardhan Rameshwar composed background music for the film.

The soundtrack received position response with praise for the composition and lyrics. The songs, particularly "Bekhayali" and "Tujhe Kitna Chahne Lage", emerged as chartbusters upon release, and the album in whole crossed more than a billion streams in music platforms. In addition, the album won Filmfare Award for Best Music Director sharing with Gully Boy (2019).

== Release ==
The soundtrack was preceded with the first single "Bekhayali" performed by Sachet Tandon and written by Irshad Kamil. Tandon who composed the song with his wife Parampara Thakur, was brought for composing a song after Kapoor liked his work in Batti Gul Meter Chalu (2018) and he arranged a meeting with Vanga and the producers. Tandon described the song conveys five emotions including pain, love, passion, anxiety and anger. The promo which released before the full audio of the song, on 24 May 2019, garnered anticipation amongst the audiences with several cover versions were made available on YouTube. Apart from Tandon's version, the song also had another version performed by Arijit Singh. India Today described "Bekhayali" as the "heartbreak anthem of 2019" and The Indian Express called it as "an ode to unrequited love".

Kabir Singh was an interesting experience because it was about heartbreak. The character is honest, temperamental and thinks from his heart. Making music for such a character is very fulfilling because you connect with the character and I have tried to create a lot of dynamism in the melody which is like the character of the main protagonist.

— Mithoon on composing "Tujhe Kitna Chahne Lage"

"Tujhe Kitna Chahne Lage" was performed by Singh, with music and lyrics by Mithoon. It was released as the second single from the album on 31 May 2019, which was described as "the phase of love and longing after falling apart". In a review for Scroll.in, the song was described as a "tearjerker". The Statesman called the song a "sad romantic track" and "an off-beat-romantic number". While Singh performed the song in the album, the film version is performed by Jubin Nautiyal.

The soundtrack was released on 7 June 2019, two weeks before the film's release.

== Reception ==
=== Critical ===
Joginder Tuteja of Bollywood Hungama gave three-and-a-half stars out of five saying "The music of Kabir Singh has a certain consistent theme that runs rights through the soundtrack, hence making it a seamless listening experience. Though not all songs would end up finding a place in the charts, at least a couple of these are set to be huge in time to come." Debarati Sen of The Times of India reviewed "Melody, definitely reigns supreme in this album and it is worth a hear". In his four-star review, Umesh Punwani of Koimoi described it as "by far the best Hindi album of 2019", edging by Gully Boy, "because of the songs with long shelf-life. It is a mixed bag of mood-worthy songs."

In contrast, Devarsi Ghosh, in a mixed review for Scroll.in, said that "the Kabir Singh soundtrack has good tunes, but it plays safe to the point of being dull. The album’s sappy saccharine rock sound is now passe. But the brains behind the Kabir Singh soundtrack felt that this was the way to go." Shreya Paul of Firstpost wrote "The soundtrack of Kabir Singh, with its passion-angst-heartbreak boxes ticked off, could have been another Rockstar or even Ae Dil Hai Mushkil. But, with the exception of 'Pehla Pyaar', 'Yeh Aaina' and 'Bekhayali', it is not able to stick the landing." Critic Vipin Nair summarised it as "an unremarkable multi-composer fare" rating two-and-a-half out of five and said "Sad that director Sandeep Vanga had to settle for this in Bollywood, after having extracted a brilliantly diverse soundtrack out of Radhan for Arjun Reddy. Oh well, at least he did not have to include a remix."

=== Commercial ===
The soundtrack's commercial success was attributed to the fresh and original compositions (mostly melodic) curated for the album, contrary to the remixes and recreations, as well as the EDM music genre produced in Hindi film music scene. Analysts contributed the music as one of the key factors to the film's success. Lyricist Prashant Ingole opining to the originality of the album, admitted that "Personally, I don't like recreations. There is so much of talent in India, and all we (the music industry) need to do is to create new music for the audience, and they will support it as well."

"Bekhayali" and "Tujhe Kitna Chahne Lage" topped Radio Mirchi charts in both weekly and year-end. The latter remained in Top 20 charts for seventeen weeks since the song's release. According to Spotify, the album was the most streamed album of 2019 in India, with "Bekhayali" and "Tujhe Kitna Chahne Lage" were the second- and third-most streamed song of 2019 in India. Both songs were listed in "Best Hindi Songs of 2019" by Rediff.com, The Quint, Scroll.in and Firstpost. By July 2020, the album crossed 1 billion streams in music platforms.

== Track listing ==
No.	Title	Lyrics	Music	Singer(s)	Length
1.	"Bekhayali"	Irshad Kamil	Sachet–Parampara	Sachet Tandon	6:11
2.	"Kaise Hua"	Manoj Muntashir	Vishal Mishra	Vishal Mishra	3:54
3.	"Tujhe Kitna Chahne Lage"	Mithoon	Mithoon	Arijit Singh	4:44
4.	"Mere Sohneya"	Irshad Kamil	Sachet–Parampara	Sachet Tandon, Parampara Thakur	3:13
5.	"Tera Ban Jaunga"	Kumaar	Akhil Sachdeva	Akhil Sachdeva, Tulsi Kumar	3:56
6.	"Yeh Aaina"	Irshad Kamil	Amaal Mallik	Shreya Ghoshal	5:11
7.	"Pehla Pyaar"	Irshad Kamil	Vishal Mishra	Armaan Malik	4:32
8.	"Bekhayali" (Arijit Singh Version)	Irshad Kamil	Sachet–Parampara	Arijit Singh	6:10
9.	"Tujhe Kitna Chahein Aur" (Film Version)	Mithoon	Mithoon	Jubin Nautiyal	4:36
Total length:					42:2

== Accolades ==
Date of ceremony	Award	Category	Recipient(s) and nominee(s)	Result	Ref.
8 December 2019	Screen Awards	Best Music Director (Note: Shared with Gully Boy.)	Akhil Sachdeva; Amaal Mallik; Mithoon; Vishal Mishra; Sachet–Parampara	Won	
8 December 2019	Screen Awards	Best Male Playback Singer	Sachet Tandon ("Bekhayali")	Won	
15 February 2020	Filmfare Awards	Best Music Director	Akhil Sachdeva; Amaal Mallik; Mithoon; Vishal Mishra; Sachet–Parampara	Won	
15 February 2020	Filmfare Awards	Best Lyricist	Irshad Kamil ("Bekhayali")	Nominated	
15 February 2020	Filmfare Awards	Best Lyricist	Mithoon ("Tujhe Kitna Chahne Lage")	Nominated	
15 February 2020	Filmfare Awards	Best Male Playback Singer	Sachet Tandon ("Bekhayali")	Nominated	
15 February 2020	Filmfare Awards	Best Female Playback Singer	Shreya Ghoshal ("Ye Aaina")	Nominated	
15 February 2020	Filmfare Awards	Best Female Playback Singer	Parampara Thakur ("Mere Sohneya")	Nominated	
19 February 2020	Mirchi Music Awards	Song of The Year	"Tujhe Kitna Chahne Lage"	Nominated	
19 February 2020	Mirchi Music Awards	Album of The Year	Kabir Singh	Nominated	
19 February 2020	Mirchi Music Awards	Listeners' Choice Album of the Year	Kabir Singh	Nominated	
19 February 2020	Mirchi Music Awards	Listeners' Choice Song of the Year	"Bekhayali"	Won	
19 February 2020	Mirchi Music Awards	Male Vocalist of The Year	Arijit Singh ("Tujhe Kitna Chahne Lage")	Nominated	
19 February 2020	Mirchi Music Awards	Female Vocalist of The Year	Parampara Thakur ("Mere Sohneya")	Nominated	
19 February 2020	Mirchi Music Awards	Music Composer of The Year	Mithoon ("Tujhe Kitna Chahne Lage")	Nominated	
19 February 2020	Mirchi Music Awards	Music Composer of The Year	Sachet–Parampara ("Bekhayali")	Nominated	
19 February 2020	Mirchi Music Awards	Lyricist of The Year	Irshad Kamil ("Bekhayali")	Nominated	
13 March 2020	Zee Cine Awards	Best Music Director	Akhil Sachdeva; Amaal Mallik; Mithoon; Vishal Mishra; Sachet–Parampara	Won	
24 November 2021	International Indian Film Academy Awards	Best Music Director	Akhil Sachdeva; Amaal Mallik; Mithoon; Vishal Mishra; Sachet–Parampara	Won	
24 November 2021	International Indian Film Academy Awards	Best Male Playback Singer	Sachet Tandon ("Bekhayali")	Nominated	
24 November 2021	International Indian Film Academy Awards	Best Female Playback Singer	Shreya Ghoshal ("Ye Aaina")	Won	
24 November 2021	International Indian Film Academy Awards	Best Lyricist	Irshad Kamil ("Bekhayali")	Nominated	
24 November 2021	International Indian Film Academy Awards	Best Lyricist	Kumaar ("Tera Ban Jaunga")	Nominated	
