= Whoopty =

2020 single by CJ

Single by CJ

from the album Loyalty Over Royalty
- Released: July 30, 2020
- Genre: Drill
- Length: 2:03
- Label: Warner
- Songwriters: Christopher Soriano, Jr.; Charalambos Antoniou; Mithun Sharma
- Producer: Pxcoyo

CJ singles chronology
"Understood" (2019)	"Whoopty" (2020)	"Bop" (2021)

Music video
- "Whoopty" on YouTube

"Whoopty" is the debut single by American rapper CJ. The song was initially self-released on July 30, 2020, before being re-released by Warner Records following his signing to the label. The song reached number 10 on the US Billboard Hot 100 chart in February 2021, as well as number three in the UK and the Billboard Global 200 top 10. It was produced by the Cypriot producer Pxcoyo and samples Arijit Singh's "Sanam Re" (2015). The song was officially remixed by fellow American rappers French Montana and Rowdy Rebel, titled "Whoopty NYC", and by Puerto Rican rappers Anuel AA and Ozuna, titled "Whoopty Latin Mix".

== Background ==
The song contains a sample of the Indian song "Sanam Re" (2015) by Arijit Singh and Mithoon, a sample shared by multiple other drill songs by rappers such as Pop Smoke, King Von, FBG Duck, and Lijpe. It is reminiscent of Brooklyn drill and marks a departure from CJ's melodic rapping. CJ said he received comparisons to late American rapper Pop Smoke, because of the song's drill sound. He said in an interview with HipHopDX that Pop Smoke's absence inspired "Whoopty", who he considers the artist that popularized the music style. He attributed its popularity to the energy conveyed in the track and its video. According to CJ's uncle music executive James Cruz, he had to pay $80,000 (using money from his daughter's college fund) for the clearance of the Sanam Re sample after the track was taken down by YouTube for copyright infringement.

== Critical reception ==
Pitchfork's Alphonse Pierre wrote that while the song "may be the biggest drill record of the last several months", "everything about it is so painfully unoriginal" in that it combines "Pop Smoke's uk drill production with 22Gz's lingo". In an earlier piece for the same site, Pierre felt the lyrics "might as well have been spit out by a machine trained on the Raps and Hustles YouTube page" and concluded that "[T]he only good thing to ever come out of Staten Island remains the Wu-Tang Clan". Tom Breihan of Stereogum had similar critiques for the song, though he added, "The song works. It moves."

== Charts ==
=== Weekly charts ===
Weekly chart performance for "Whoopty"
Chart (2020–2021)	Peak position
Australia (ARIA)	13
Austria (Ö3 Austria Top 40)	12
Belgium (Ultratop 50 Flanders)	46
Belgium (Ultratop 50 Wallonia)	45
Canada (Canadian Hot 100)	14
Czech Republic Singles Digital (ČNS IFPI)	19
Denmark (Tracklisten)	11
Finland (Suomen virallinen lista)	8
France (SNEP)	14
Germany (GfK)	22
Greece (IFPI)	1
Global 200 (Billboard)	10
Hungary (Single Top 40)	11
Hungary (Stream Top 40)	9
Iceland (Tónlistinn)	21
Ireland (IRMA)	10
Italy (FIMI)	47
Lithuania (AGATA)	14
Netherlands (Single Top 100)	12
New Zealand (Recorded Music NZ)	18
Norway (VG-lista)	10
Portugal (AFP)	86
Romania (Airplay 100)	83
Slovakia (Singles Digitál Top 100)	10
Spain (Promusicae)	60
Sweden (Sverigetopplistan)	16
Switzerland (Schweizer Hitparade)	10
UK Singles (Official Charts)	3
UK Hip Hop/R&B (Official Charts)	2
US Billboard Hot 100	10
US Hot R&B/Hip-Hop Songs (Billboard)	3
US Mainstream Top 40 (Billboard)	37
US Rhythmic (Billboard)	1

=== Year-end charts ===
Year-end chart performance for "Whoopty"
Chart (2021)	Position
Australia (ARIA)	72
Canada (Canadian Hot 100)	38
Denmark (Tracklisten)	86
France (SNEP)	97
Germany (Official German Charts)	88
Global 200 (Billboard)	52
Hungary (Single Top 40)	87
Hungary (Stream Top 40)	57
Iceland (Tónlistinn)	96
Portugal (AFP)	81
Switzerland (Schweizer Hitparade)	59
UK Singles (OCC)	84
US Billboard Hot 100	50
US Hot R&B/Hip-Hop Songs (Billboard)	20
US Rhythmic (Billboard)	22

== Certifications ==
Certifications for "Whoopty"
Region	Certification	Certified units/sales
Australia (ARIA) CJ Feat. French Montana & Rowdy Rebel	Platinum	70,000^{‡}
Austria (IFPI Austria)	Platinum	30,000^{‡}
Belgium (BRMA)	Gold	20,000^{‡}
Canada (Music Canada)	2× Platinum	160,000^{‡}
Denmark (IFPI Danmark)	Platinum	90,000^{‡}
France (SNEP)	Diamond	333,333^{‡}
Germany (BVMI)	Gold	200,000^{‡}
Italy (FIMI)	Platinum	70,000^{‡}
New Zealand (RMNZ)	2× Platinum	60,000^{‡}
Poland (ZPAV)	Platinum	50,000^{‡}
Portugal (AFP)	Platinum	10,000^{‡}
Spain (Promusicae)	Gold	30,000^{‡}
United Kingdom (BPI)	Platinum	600,000^{‡}
United States (RIAA)	2× Platinum	2,000,000^{‡}
^{‡} Sales+streaming figures based on certification alone.

== Release history ==
Release history of "Whoopty"
Country	Date	Format	Label	Ref.
Various	July 20, 2020	Digital download; streaming	Self-released	
United States	December 1, 2020	Rhythmic radio	Warner	
United States	December 1, 2020	Urban adult contemporary radio	Warner	
United Kingdom	January 8, 2021	Contemporary hit radio	Warner	
