= Radhe Shyam (soundtrack) =

- Telugu album cover

Soundtrack album by Justin Prabhakaran, Mithoon, Amaal Mallik, and Manan Bhardwaj
- Released: 12 March 2022
- Recorded: 2020–2021
- Genre: Feature film soundtrack
- Length: Telugu version: 21:09; Hindi version: 44:52
- Languages: Telugu; Hindi
- Label: T-Series
- Producer: Telugu version: Justin Prabhakaran: Hindi version: Mithoon Amaal Mallik Manan Bhardwaj

Radhe Shyam is the 2022 soundtrack album composed by Justin Prabhakaran, Mithoon, Amaal Mallik, and Manan Bhardwaj to the 2022 Indian period romantic drama film of the same name written and directed by Radha Krishna Kumar, starring Prabhas and Pooja Hegde.

== Production ==
A. R. Rahman was reportedly approached to compose music for the film. However, Rahman did not sign the film.

The film was announced to have two different soundtracks for the Telugu and Hindi versions.

The Hindi soundtrack is composed by Mithoon, Amaal Mallik and Manan Bhardwaj, while Justin Prabhakaran is composing the songs in the Telugu version and dubbed versions.

Manoj Muntashir, Rashmi Virag, Kumaar, Mithoon were reported to be providing lyrics for Hindi, while Krishna Kanth is providing lyrics for Telugu. The soundtrack features a total of 7 songs in total.

On 13 November 2021, it was announced that the first single for the Telugu version was going to be released on 15 November 2021.

On 28 November 2021, it was announced that the first single for the Hindi version and the second single for the Telugu version were going to be released on 1 December 2021. However due to the passing of lyricist Sirivennela Seetharama Sastry, the Telugu version was delayed to 2 December 2021 while the Hindi version was still released on 1 December 2021.

On 5 December 2021, it was announced that the second single for the Hindi version was going to be released on 8 December 2021.

On 13 December 2021, it was announced that the third single for all the versions was going to be released on 16 December 2021.

== Release ==
The first single was released on 15 November 2021. The lyrical version of the single was made as a conceptual 3D video by Anil Kumar Upadyaula which features both the leads. The song was released as "Ee Raathale" (in Telugu), "Aagoozhile" (in Tamil), "Kaanaakkare" (in Malayalam) and "Ee Reethile" (in Kannada) with vocals by Yuvan Shankar Raja for Telugu and Tamil, Nihal Sadiq in Malayalam and Kannada while Harini Ivaturi gave the female vocals for all languages.

== Track listing ==
All tracks are written by Krishna Kanth.

Telugu
No.	Title	Music	Singer(s)	Length
1.	"Sanchari"	Justin Prabhakaran	Anirudh Ravichander	4:28
2.	"Nagumomu Thaarale"	Justin Prabhakaran	Sid Sriram	4:54
3.	"Ee Raathale"	Justin Prabhakaran	Yuvan Shankar Raja, Harini Ivaturi	3:52
4.	"Ninnele"	Justin Prabhakaran	Shreya Ghoshal, Anurag Kulkarni	4:00
5.	"Krishna Krishna"	Justin Prabhakaran	Sathya Yamini	1:47
6.	"Sei Un Angelo"	Justin Prabhakaran	Justin Prabhakaran	0:54
7.	"Sundhara Vadhana"	Justin Prabhakaran	Aishwarya Ravichandran	1:13
Total length:				21:09

Hindi
No.	Title	Lyrics	Music	Singer(s)	Length
1.	"Aashiqui Aa Gayi"	Mithoon	Mithoon	Arijit Singh, Mithoon	4:20
2.	"Soch Liya"	Manoj Muntashir	Mithoon	Arijit Singh, Mithoon	4:43
3.	"Udd Jaa Parindey"	Mithoon	Mithoon	Jubin Nautiyal	4:18
4.	"Jaan Hai Meri"	Rashmi Virag	Amaal Malik	Amaal Malik, Armaan Malik	4:34
5.	"Main Ishq Mein Hoon"	Kumaar	Manan Bhardwaj	Manan Bhardwaj, Harjot Kaur	6:05
6.	"Shooting Stars"		Mithoon	Instrumental	0:53
7.	"Labon Pe Naam"	Rashmi Virag	Amaal Malik	Amaal Malik, Armaan Malik	4:18
8.	"Ye Ishq Na Ho"	Kumaar	Manan Bhardwaj	Manan Bhardwaj, Harjot Kaur	5:21
9.	"Jaan Hai Meri (Lofi)"	Rashmi Virag	Amaal Malik	Amaal Malik, Armaan Malik	3:22
10.	"Main Ishq Mein Hoon (Reprise)"	Manan Bhardwaj	Manan Bhardwaj	Manan Bhardwaj	3:43
11.	"Soch Liya (The Composer's Draft)"	Manoj Muntashir	Mithoon	Mithoon	3:12
Total length:					44:52

All tracks are written by Madhan Karky.

Tamil
No.	Title	Music	Singer(s)	Length
1.	"Aagoozhile"	Justin Prabhakaran	Yuvan Shankar Raja, Harini Ivaturi	3:52
2.	"Thiraiyoadu Thoorigai"	Justin Prabhakaran	Sid Sriram	4:54
3.	"Raegaigal"	Justin Prabhakaran	Sathya Prakash	4:28
4.	"Unnaalae"	Justin Prabhakaran	Shreya Ghoshal, Anurag Kulkarni	4:00
5.	"Krishna Krishna"	Justin Prabhakaran	Sathya Yamini	1:47
6.	"Sei Un Angelo"	Justin Prabhakaran		0:54
7.	"Sundhara Vadhana"	Justin Prabhakaran	Aishwarya Ravichandran	1:13
Total length:				21:10

All tracks are written by Joe Paul.

Malayalam
No.	Title	Music	Singer(s)	Length
1.	"Kaanaakkare"	Justin Prabhakaran	Nihal Sadiq, Harini Ivaturi	3:52
2.	"Malarodu Saayame"	Justin Prabhakaran	Sooraj Santhosh	4:54
3.	"Swapnadoorame"	Justin Prabhakaran	Sathya Prakash	4:28
4.	"Ninnaale"	Justin Prabhakaran	Shweta Pandit, Anurag Kulkarni	4:00
5.	"Krishna Krishna"	Justin Prabhakaran	Sathya Yamini	1:47
6.	"Sei Un Angelo"	Justin Prabhakaran		0:54
7.	"Sundhara Vadhana"	Justin Prabhakaran	Aishwarya Ravichandran	1:13
Total length:				21:10

All tracks are written by Dhananjay Ranjan.

Kannada
No.	Title	Music	Singer(s)	Length
1.	"Ee Reethile"	Justin Prabhakaran	Nihal Sadiq, Harini Ivaturi	3:52
2.	"Naguvantha Thaareye"	Justin Prabhakaran	Sooraj Santhosh	4:54
3.	"Sanchari"	Justin Prabhakaran	Sathya Prakash	4:28
4.	"Ninnalle"	Justin Prabhakaran	Shweta Pandit, Anurag Kulkarni	4:00
5.	"Krishna Krishna"	Justin Prabhakaran	Sathya Yamini	1:47
6.	"Sei Un Angelo"	Justin Prabhakaran		0:54
7.	"Sundhara Vadhana"	Justin Prabhakaran	Aishwarya Ravichandran	1:13
Total length:				21:09
