= Sanam Re (song) =

2015 song by Mithoon featuring Arijit Singh

Song by Mithoon featuring Arijit Singh

from the album Sanam Re
- Language: Hindi
- Released: 22 December 2015
- Genre: Sufi; Qawwali; Sufi rock
- Length: 5:08
- Label: T Series
- Songwriter: Mithoon
- Producer: Mithoon

Music video
- "Sanam Re" on YouTube

"Sanam Re" is an Indian Hindi-language song written and composed by Mithoon from the 2016 soundtrack album to the film of the same name. The song is sung by Arijit Singh. The track was officially released on 22 December 2015.

== Legacy ==
The song has been sampled in several hip hop songs, particularly in the subgenre of drill. It was first sampled in "Exposing Me" (2018) by Chicago drill rapper Memo600, which was remixed in a 2019 version featuring King Von. Further remixes of "Exposing Me" were made by FBG Duck, featuring Rooga, and 22Gz. American rapper CJ sampled the song in his track "Whoopty" (2020). Other notable samples include "Vergeet De Buurt Nooit" by Lijpe and "Face To Face" by Italian rapper Rondodasosa.

== Chart performance ==
Year	Chart	Peak Position	Time Span on Chart	Ref.
2016	Mirchi Music Top 20 Countdown	1	21 weeks	

== Accolades ==
Award (Note: Awards, festivals and organizations are in alphabetical order.)	Date of ceremony (Note: Date is linked to the article about the awards held that year, wherever possible.)	Category	Recipient(s)	Result	Ref.
Global Indian Music Academy Awards	6 April 2016	Most Streamed Song of the Year	"Sanam Re"	Won	
