= Saakshyam (soundtrack) =

- Album cover

Soundtrack album by Harshavardhan Rameshwar
- Released: 7 July 2018
- Recorded: 2017–2018
- Studio: Sound Works Studio, Hyderabad; New Edge Studios, Mumbai
- Genre: Feature film soundtrack
- Length: 42:59
- Language: Telugu
- Label: Junglee Music
- Producer: Harshavardhan Rameshwar

Harshavardhan Rameshwar chronology
Vijetha (2018)	Saakshyam (2018)	Kabir Singh (2012)

Singles from Saakshyam
- 1. "Soundarya Lahari" Released: 4 May 2018; 2. "Design Your Destiny" Released: 13 May 2018; 3. "Panchabhoothalu" Released: 7 July 2018

Saakshyam is the soundtrack album composed by Harshavardhan Rameshwar for the 2018 Telugu-language fantasy action film of the same name starring Bellamkonda and Pooja Hegde in lead roles, directed by Sriwass. The album consists of eight songs with. Lyrics were penned by Ananta Sriram. The soundtrack album was released by Junglee Music on 7 July 2018. The release coincided with a promotional event held at the Shilpakala Vedika, Hyderabad.

The album received positive reviews from critics, praising Harshavardhan Rameshwar's composition, and lyrics. The track "Panchabhoothalu" (also known as "Shivam Shivam") was highly praised. The tracks topped the charts and FM stations.

== Production ==
In May 2017, Devi Sri Prasad was reportedly approached to compose music for the film. Later it was reported that Shakthikanth Karthick would compose the music. Later, Harshavardhan Rameshwar was confirmed to compose the songs and score for the film. Sreenivas revealed "Harshawardhan has worked on this one for a year without taking up any other project. He dedicated himself to it completely."

Ananta Sriram, who also played a prominent role in the film was signed to write lyrics for the tracks. He earlier collaborated with Sriwass for Rama Rama Krishna Krishna (2010), Pandavulu Pandavulu Tummeda (2014) and Loukyam (2014). The film also marked his second collaboration with Sreenivas after Speedunnodu (2016). The music rights were bagged by Junglee Music of Times Music.

In an interview, the producer Abhishek Nama said "No song is unnecessary. The story demanded the 13-minute-long song rendered by SPB, Jesudas, Kailash Kher, Hariharan and Bombay Jayashree. It's about the five elements."

== Composition ==
The track "Design Your Destiny" was sung by Haricharan, Jithin Raj and Harshavardhan Rameshwar himself. The song "Ishq Karle" was recorded by Ranjith Govind, Janani and Yadhu Krishnan. The song "Soundarya Lahari" was sung by Jithin Raj and Aarthi.

The track "Dung Dung Dung Dung" was Padmalatha, M. M. Manasi and Ananthu. The team roped in K. J. Yesudas, S. P. Balasubrahmanyam, Hariharan, Kailash Kher, Bombay Jayashri to sing the 12-minute (Panchamahabhuta) song titled "Shivam Shivam". The song was based on five classical elements– Earth, Water, Air, Fire and Aether.

The next track "Cheliya Choode" was recorded by Madhu Priya along with Harshavardhan Rameshwar. K. J. Yesudas provided his voice for the song "Bhava Maaya". The track "Thatra Gandhavathi Pruthvi" was sung by Bombay Jayashri. S. P. Balasubrahmanyam recorded "Om Agnirwa Apa". The song was sung by "Sapdha Gunakam" Hariharan. Kailash Kher provided his voice for the final track "Gange Jayamu".

== Marketing and release ==
On 3 May 2018, makers announced that the first single would release on the next day. The first single titled "Soundarya Lahari" was released on 4 May 2018.

On 11 May 2019, makers announced that the second single would release soon. Later, the second single "Design Your Destiny" was released on 13 May 2018.

With both the released singles receiving good response, the makers decided to release other songs along with the album. Later, it was reported that audio will release in a promotional event in early 2018.

The third single titled "Panchabhoothalu" was released on 7 July 2018 at 9:30 am in Red FM 93.5, by Bellamkonda Sreenivas, Pooja Hegde, Sriwass and Anantha Sriram. The audio launch event was held on 7 July 2012, evening at Shilpakala Vedika, Hyderabad. The lyrical video of "Shivam Shivam" was released on 20 July 2018 on YouTube.

== Music videos ==
Videos were Choreographed by dance choreographers Shobi Paulraj, Raghu and Bhanu. The full video of the first single "Soundarya Lahari" was released on 25 February 2019. Music video featuring Sreenivas and Hegde was shot on a busy street at New York City in late-April 2018. The video song of "Design Your Destiny" (also known as "Wake Up Boys") was released on 8 March 2019. The video song was shot in December 2017 at Dubai. "You are literally flying 20 feet high in the air [on flyboard], trying to balance yourself on the water. It hurts very bad when you fall, but it was so much fun. I like to do all he stunts myself, because it makes them more believable. I also did sandboarding, jet skiing and even did stunts on a BMX cycle for my opening sequence", Sreenivas on production of music video of the song "Design Your Destiny".

The music video of "Ishq Karle" was shot in Grand Canyon in mid-April 2018. Hegde said "It was my first visit to Grand Canyon in USA, and it was quite a surreal feeling to shoot there". The jukebox of full video songs were released on 10 May 2019 on YouTube.

== Track listing ==
All lyrics are written by Anantha Sriram.

Track-List
No.	Title	Singer(s)	Length
1.	"Design Your Destiny"	Harshavardhan Rameshwar, Haricharan, Jithin Raj	4:53
2.	"Ishq Karle"	Ranjith Govind, Yadhu Krishnan, Janani	3:44
3.	"Soundarya Lahari"	Jithin Raj, Aarthi	4:18
4.	"Dung Dung Dung Dung"	Padmalatha, M. M. Manasi and Ananthu	4:07
5.	"Shivam Shivam"	K. J. Yesudas, S. P. Balasubrahmanyam, Hariharan, Kailash Kher, Bombay Jayashri	12:18
6.	"Cheliya Choode"	Harshavardhan Rameshwar, Madhu Priya	3:25
7.	"Bhava Maaya"	K. J. Yesudas	2:23
8.	"Thatra Gandhavathi Pruthvi"	Bombay Jayashri	2:15
9.	"Om Agnirwa Apa"	S. P. Balasubrahmanyam	2:17
10.	"Sapdha Gunakam"	Hariharan	1:12
11.	"Gange Jayamu"	Kailash Kher	2:08
Total length:			42:59

== Reception ==
Reviewing the track "Design Your Destiny", IndiaGlitz critic wrote: "It's fit to be a hero's introduction song and music director Harshavardhan Rameshwar selects the right mix of voices."

Vyas of The Hans India noted: "Harshavardhan Rameshwar's music is decent whereas the lyrics by Ananth Sriram are awesome." Jeevi of Idlebrain.com wrote: "Music scored by Harshavardhan Rameshwar is good and background music is also good".

Hemanth Kumar CR of Firstpost wrote: "Harshavardhan Rameshwar’s background score "works quite well"". VikramGuru of Chitramala wrote: Harshavardhan Rameshwar "has given some catchy tunes and delivered a winning album for his debut. Soundarya Lahari and Shivam Shivam are our picks. He again mesmerised and has shown his talent in scoring hitting background score.

Suresh Kavirayani of Deccan Chronicle opined "Music is by Harshwardhan Rameshwar and most songs have a “mass” touch." His background score is good. Shekhar H Hooli of International Business Times wrote: Harshwardhan Rameshwar's background score is decent.

== Impact ==
The songs were trending on all FM stations and charts. The track "Panchabhoothalu" (also known as "Shivam Shivam") was the highlight of the album and was highly praised.

On the success of the film's soundtrack album, Times Music COO Mandar Thakur stated "Saakshyam features great music which is garnering an amazing response! Kudos to director Sriwass and music director Harshavardhan".
