= Shab (film) =

2017 film directed by Onir

- Theatrical release poster
- Directed by: Onir
- Written by: Merle Kröger; Onir
- Produced by: Sanjay Suri; Onir
- Starring: Raveena Tandon; Arpita Chatterjee; Ashish Bisht; Gaurav Nanda; Simon Frenay; Areesz Ganddi
- Cinematography: Sachin K. Krishn
- Edited by: Irene Dhar Malik; Onir
- Music by: Songs: Mithoon; Background Score: Shashwat Srivastava
- Production companies: Anticlock Films; WSG Pictures
- Distributed by: Anticlock Films
- Release dates: May 1, 2017 (United States); July 14, 2017 (India)
- Country: India
- Languages: Hindi; English; Bengali
- Box office: ₹32 crore

Shab (transl. The night) is a 2017 Indian romantic drama film directed by Onir and produced by Sanjay Suri and Onir for Anticlock Films, WSG Pictures and Surya Entertainment. It stars Raveena Tandon, Arpita Chatterjee, Ashish Bisht, Simon Frenay, Gaurav Nanda and Areesz Ganddi.

The film was screened at the New York Indian Film Festival on 1 May 2017, and its projected Indian release date of 30 June was postponed to 14 July 2017.

The film's trailer was released on 17 May 2017 in India.

== Synopsis ==
This film is about the lives of people who live on the edge of what society finds acceptable. It is about coming to terms with oneself and accepting other people as they are. The film is set in the cosmopolitan city of Delhi, where people from all over the country come to fulfill their dreams. For some, these dreams are realized, while others remain in an endless pursuit of other elusive dreams. Perhaps it is the hope of ultimately reaching that destination that keeps one going. And then there are others who surrender to the overwhelming power of the city of dreams and get lost in the maze. This film is the story of a coffee shop girl, Raina, and the man who loves her, Afzar, an aspiring model. Sonal is a fashion patron who becomes his mentor. The film centers around their intense relationship. Love, hurt, and power. Into their lives comes Benoit, a French expat who teaches French in Delhi.

== Cast ==
- Arpita Chatterjee as Raina
- Raveena Tandon as Sonal Modi
- Ashish Bisht as Mohan/Afzar
- Gaurav Nanda as Baljeet
- Raj Suri as Rohan
- Sanjay Suri as Vivek Modi
- Simon Frenay as Benoit

== Music ==
Shab

Soundtrack album by Mithoon
- Released: 25 June 2017
- Genre: Feature film soundtrack
- Length: 24:16
- Label: TIPS Music

The music for Shab was composed by Mithoon with lyrics penned by Amitabh S. Verma and Mithoon. The background score was composed by Shashwat Srivastava and the soundtrack was released by Tips Music.

Tracklist
No.	Title	Lyrics	Singer(s)	Length
1.	"O Saathi"	Mithoon	Arijit Singh	04:46
2.	"Musafir"	Amitabh S. Verma	K.K.	04:35
3.	"Aawari"	Amitabh S. Verma	Mithoon	05:14
4.	"Afiya"	Amitabh S. Verma	Mohammed Irfan & Arun Daga	04:39
5.	"Aawari (Reprise)"	Amitabh S. Verma	Neha Bhasin	05:02
Total length:				24:16

== Reception ==
Filmfare rated the film with 3 stars saying that the film is worth a watch due to the maturity and the subtlety of handling the subject by director Onir, but Koimoi gave the film only 1.5 stars saying that it's not a family entertainer everyone would like to watch and enjoy. They also wrote, the film might satisfy those who enjoys the stories dealing with complexities of urban life relationships. Deccan Chronicle offered that the film had great characters lost within a poor narrative, writing "Onir has a brilliant take on homosexuality and he beautifully weaves it into his films each time, but it all goes haywire in this one. The most worthless thing in the film is its cheesy dialogues."
