= Aashiqui Aa Gayi =

2022 single by Arijit Singh

- Aashiqui Aa Gayi song cover featuring actors Prabhas and Pooja Hegde

Single by Arijit Singh, Mithoon

from the album Radhe Shyam
- Language: Hindi
- Released: 1 December 2021
- Recorded: 2020–2021
- Genre: Filmi; Indian pop; soft-rock
- Length: 4:20
- Label: T-Series
- Composer: Mithoon
- Lyricist: Mithoon
- Producers: Mithoon; Bhushan Kumar

Radhe Shyam track listing
- 5 tracks: 1. "Aashiqui Aa Gayi"; 2. "Soch Liya"; 3. "Udd Jaa Parindey"; 4. "Jaan Hai Meri"; 5. "Main Ishq Mein Hoon"

Music video
- "Aashiqui Aa Gayi" on YouTube

"Aashiqui Aa Gayi" (transl. Love has come) is an Indian Hindi-language song sung by Arijit Singh and composed by Mithoon for the 2022 soundtrack album Radhe Shyam of the film of the same name, starring Prabhas and Pooja Hegde. The song is written by Mithoon. The song was released on 1 December 2021. The music video for the song was released on the same day under the music label T-Series. The full video song, featuring visuals directly from the film, was released on 22 March 2022 on YouTube.

== Release ==
The teaser of the song was released on 29 November 2021. The music video was released on 1 December 2021, by T-Series. The lyrical was released on 19 December 2021 and the audio of the song was released on 23 December 2021. The song was made available at iTunes the same day of release and for online streaming at JioSaavn and Gaana on 1 December 2021. The full video song, featuring visuals directly from the film, was released on 22 March 2022 on YouTube.

== Music video ==
The music video features Prabhas and Pooja Hegde. The video shows Vikramaditya (Prabhas) take Prerana (Pooja Hegde) on bike rides, beach strolls at various locations with matching outfits, creating a dream sequence like feel. The song gives a look at the chemistry between them.

=== Filming ===
The music video of the song is shot in Italy, the song's visuals are filled with scenery of lush green mountains tops, beach, rainbow or a wrecked plane on a deserted spot. Some parts of song was shot at -2°C in snow rain.

== Reception ==
=== Audience response ===
Upon the release of the song, it gained lots of appreciation for its music and choreography. Pooja Hegde's grace and style in the song was appreciated by many.

=== Critical reviews ===
A critic from Cinestaan wrote that "The song sees Mithoon in three avatars. His poetry as a lyricist is simple and doesn't boast of heavy words, which goes well with the nature of a massy romantic song. The music, again by Mithoon, is a fine mixture of soft tunes and foot-tapping sounds. Lastly, as a singer he weaves magic with his vocal chords, with some support from Arijit Singh at the end". Telangana Today wrote that "With the romantic 'Aashiqui Aa Gayi', he delivered a gem in his extremely soulful voice for incredibly beautiful lyrics penned by Mithoon who has also aced music with his amazing composition. Melody to ears and soothing to heart, the splendid tunes enhanced the beauty of this song".

== Records ==
The song crossed more than 22 million views within 24 hours and became the most viewed video song in the first 24 hours of its release.

== Charts ==
Chart performances for "Aashiqui Aa Gayi"
Chart (2021)	Peak position
United Kingdom (Asian Music Chart Top 40)	25

== Music credits ==
Credits adapted from T-Series.

- Mithoon – composer, lyrics, programmer, arranger
- Arijit Singh – vocals
- Dilshaad Shabbir Shaikh – additional vocals
- Sahil Solanki – additional vocals
- Munawwar Ali – additional vocals
- Dilshaad Shabbir Shaikh – vocals supervision
- Eric Pillai – mixing, mastering [at Future Sound Of Bombay]
- Michael Edwin Pillai – assistance mixing, assistance mastering
- Anugrah – creative supervision
- Kalyan Baruah – guitars
- Bobby Shrivastava – drums
- Eli Rodrigues – recording engineer
- Kaushal Gohil – musicians co-ordinators, studio assistance

== Nagumomu Thaarale (Telugu version) ==
"Nagumomu Thaarale"

Single by Sid Sriram

from the album Radhe Shyam
- Language: Telugu
- Released: 2 December 2021
- Recorded: 2020–2021
- Genre: Filmi; Indian pop; soft-rock
- Length: 4:54
- Label: T-Series
- Composer: Justin Prabhakaran
- Lyricist: Krishna Kanth
- Producer: Justin Prabhakaran

Sid Sriram singles chronology
"Yevarive Prema Hrudhayama" (2021)	"Nagumomu Thaarale" (2021)	"Nee Kosam" (2022)

Radhe Shyam track listing
- 4 tracks: 1. "Ee Raathale"; 2. "Nagumomu Thaarale"; 3. "Sanchari"; 4. "Ninnele"

Music video
- "Nagumomu Thaarale" on YouTube

"Nagumomu Thaarale" (transl. Smiling stars) is an Indian Telugu-language song by singer Sid Sriram and composed by Justin Prabhakaran from the 2022 soundtrack album Radhe Shyam of the film of the same name. The song is written by Krishna Kanth. The song was released on 2 December 2021. The music video of the song was released on the same day. The full video song, featuring visuals directly from the film, was released on 23 March 2022 on YouTube.

=== Release ===
The teaser of the song was released on 29 November 2021. The song was scheduled to release on 1 December 2021, but due to the passing of lyricist Sirivennela Seetharama Sastry, it was released on 2 December 2021, by T-Series. The full video song, featuring visuals directly from the film, was released on 23 March 2022 on YouTube.

== Track listing ==
The track was released as "Nagumomu Thaarale" in Telugu (lyrics written by Krishna Kanth), "Thiraiyoadu Thoorigai" in Tamil (lyrics written by Madhan Karky), as "Naguvantha Thaareye" in Kannada (lyrics written by Dhananjay Ranjan) and as "Malarodu Saayame" in Malayalam (lyrics written by Joe Paul) languages with vocals by Sid Sriram for Telugu and Tamil while Sooraj Santhosh sung the Kannada and Malayalam version of this track.

Tracks

1. "Aashiqui Aa Gayi" (Hindi) - 4:20
2. "Nagumomu Thaarale" (Telugu) - 4:54
3. "Thiraiyoadu Thoorigai" (Tamil) - 4:54
4. "Naguvantha Thaareye" (Kannada) - 4:54
5. "Malarodu Saayame" (Malayalam) - 4:54
