= Sanam Re =

2016 Indian film by Divya Khosla Kumar

- Theatrical release poster
- Directed by: Divya Khosla Kumar
- Written by: Hussain Dalal; Sanjeev Datta
- Screenplay by: Sanjeev Data
- Story by: Sanjeev Datta
- Produced by: Bhushan Kumar; Krishan Kumar
- Starring: Pulkit Samrat; Yami Gautam; Urvashi Rautela; Rishi Kapoor
- Cinematography: Sameer Arya
- Edited by: Chandrashekhar Prajapati
- Music by: Songs: Mithoon; Jeet Gannguli; Amaal Mallik; Epic Bhangra; Aydin Vance; Background Score: Raju Singh
- Production company: T-Series Films
- Distributed by: Prateek Entertainments
- Release date: 12 February 2016
- Running time: 120 minutes
- Country: India
- Language: Hindi

Sanam Re (transl. 'Oh beloved') is a 2016 Indian Hindi-language romantic drama film directed by Divya Khosla Kumar and produced by Bhushan Kumar, Krishan Kumar, and co-produced by Ajay Kapoor. The film stars Pulkit Samrat, Yami Gautam, Urvashi Rautela, and Rishi Kapoor.

The film was released worldwide on 12 February 2016 on Valentine's Day weekend.

== Plot ==
Akash works for a private firm in Mumbai and leads a monotonous life. When he learns that his grandfather's health is worsening, he leaves the city to visit his native town, Tanakpur. There, he negotiates a deal to sell his grandfather's studio. While visiting the studio one last time, he gets nostalgic, and the story flashes back.

Six-year-old Akash lives with his parents and grandfather, who is a photographer. Akash's grandfather predicts that Akash will fall in love with a girl who lives 500 steps away from their studio and that they will be in love forever but won't be able to live together. Akash takes 500 steps and finds a girl older than him, disappointing him.

Meanwhile, when he gets to high-school, he falls for Shruti. But he left her without informing just because he had to continue his higher studies in Mumbai. When Shruti learns this, she is shattered. She couldn't accept his selfishness after a long-term, affectionate relationship.

When he learns that his boss has fired him, he rushes back and is asked to secure a big contract for his company if he wants to save his job. He travels to Canada to meet Mrs. Pablo, their company investor's wife who is now broken-up with her husband. He attends a yoga camp, where he becomes friends with Mrs. Pablo and learns that her real name is Akansha.

Akash also meets Shruti there, who behaves like a happy-go-lucky and doesn't recognise Akash. Akash pretends to be in love with Akansha to secure the contract, but he and Shruti fall in love with each other again during completing a task in the camp. They sleep together and revive their lost love. It is also revealed that Akansha is none other than the tall girl that Akash met in his childhood. Akash is again left heartbroken when Shruti leaves at the end of the camp, saying that they can't be together.

Akash realises Shruti still loves him and embarks on a journey to find the truth behind her rejection with the help of Akansha. He learns that she left him because she is suffering from a rare heart disease; she will die if her heart isn't transplanted soon. She requests him to live with her, all the life they would have if they were given a chance. In just a few days, they experience the life of being newly married, being a wedded couple and growing old. By the time they finish experiencing those days, they have a sweet and emotional conversation, and now Akash has to leave for his job.

A few months later, Shruti moves out of the hospital, healthy and cured; they found a donor and the transplant was done. In order to be with Akash, she moves to the city to find him and is left shocked when his phone is switched off and she can't contact him.

Hopelessly, she wanders around until she finds a voice note left by Akash, then further goes in search for him. In the end, when she passes near her own house, her heart begins to beat faster.

That's when she realises that Akash was the one who gave his heart to her for the transplant because Akash's heart always beat faster when he passed through Shruti's house as he loved her a lot. Thus, Shruti realises that Akash is dead and cries a lot in the memory of Akash. Then she goes on to open the studio of Akash's grandfather and hangs the wood where "Aakash loves Shruti" was written by both of them during their childhood. The film ends with a snap of Akash's grandfather, taken by Shruti, in their studio.

== Cast ==
- Pulkit Samrat as Akash / Bill
- Yami Gautam as Shruti / Anjali
- Urvashi Rautela as Akansha / Mrs. Pablo
- Rishi Kapoor as Akash's Grandfather/Daddu
- Aashish Kaul as Akash's Father
- Prachi Shah as Akash's Mom
- Bharti Singh as Babyji
- Ketki Dave as Visitor's Wife
- Shreyas Pardiwalla as Titu
- Jiten Mukhi as Visitor
- Manoj Joshi as Akash's Boss
- Ankit Arora as Doc
- Muna Ali (cameo appearance)
- Divya Khosla Kumar as an item girl in songs "Humne Pee Rakhi Hai" and "Akkad Bakkad" (cameo appearance)
- Jaz Dhami as Singer in the song "Humne Pee Rakhi Hai" (cameo appearance)

== Production ==
The film began production in December 2014, in Barog station Shimla. Sanam Re was shot in multiple locations like Mumbai, Chandigarh, Shimla, Kalpa and Ladakh, Banff, Jasper, Waterton Park, Tanakpur and Calgary, Canada.

== Soundtrack ==
Sanam Re

Soundtrack album by Mithoon, Jeet Gannguli, Amaal Mallik and Epic Bhangra
- Released: 4 January 2016
- Recorded: 2015–2016
- Genre: Feature film soundtrack
- Length: 40:43
- Language: Hindi
- Label: T-Series

The music for Sanam Re was composed by Mithoon, Jeet Gannguli, Amaal Mallik, and Epic Bhangra. Raju Singh composed the original background score. The lyrics were penned by Rashmi Virag, Mithoon, Manoj Muntashir, Manoj Yadav, Ikka Singh and Kumaar.

The film's title track, "Sanam Re" featuring the vocals of Arijit Singh, was released as a single on 22 December 2015. The second song, titled "Gazab Ka Hai Yeh Din" was released on 1 January 2016. One song, "Kya Tujhe Ab Ye Dil Bataye" was sung by Pakistani pop singer Falak Shabir. The soundtrack was released on 4 January 2016 by T-Series.

Original track listing
| No. | Title | Lyrics | Music | Singer(s) | Length |
|---|---|---|---|---|---|
| 1. | "Sanam Re" | Mithoon | Mithoon | Arijit Singh, (Additional Vocals) Mithoon | 05:08 |
| 2. | "Gazab Ka Hai Yeh Din" | Manoj Muntashir | Amaal Mallik | Arijit Singh | 05:25 |
| 3. | "Hua Hain Aaj Pehli Baar" | Manoj Yadav | Amaal Mallik | Amaal Mallik, Armaan Malik, Palak Muchhal | 05:09 |
| 4. | "Humne Pee Rakhi Hai" | Ikka, Kumaar | Epic Bhangra | Jaz Dhami, Neha Kakkar, Ikka Singh | 03:45 |
| 5. | "Kya Tujhe Ab Ye Dil Bataye" | Manoj Muntashir | Amaal Mallik | Falak Shabir | 05:36 |
| 6. | "Tere Liye" | Mithoon | Mithoon | Ankit Tiwari | 07:07 |
| 7. | "Tum Bin" | Rashmi Virag | Jeet Gannguli | Shreya Ghoshal | 04:44 |
| 8. | "Chhote Chhote Tamashe" | Manoj Muntashir | Jeet Gannguli | Shaan | 03:45 |
| Total length: | | | | | 40:43 |

Three songs were released later and were not the part of the film's album. The female version of title track was released in the voice of Tulsi Kumar and Mithoon and latter on Falak Shabir and T-Series released Kya Tujhe Ab Ye Dil Bataye in Unplugged & Sad Version on 4 February 2016. The additional rap song by Badshah titled "Akkad Bakkad", was released on 8 February 2016 to celebrate the music of the film.

Bonus track listing
| No. | Title | Lyrics | Music | Singers | Length |
|---|---|---|---|---|---|
| 1. | "Sanam Re (Lounge Mix)" | Mithoon | Mithoon | Tulsi Kumar, Mithoon | 04:36 |
| 2. | "Akkad Bakkad" | Badshah | Badshah | Badshah, Neha Kakkar | 03:13 |
| 3. | "Kya Tujhe Ab Ye Dil Bataye (Unplugged & Sad Version)" | Manoj Muntashir | Amaal Mallik | Falak Shabir | 05:30 |
| Total length: | | | | | 13:19 |

== Reception ==
Critic from Bollywood Hungama rated the film 3.5 out of 5 stars and wrote "Sanam Re is a sweet romantic love story smeared with a cathartic tear that is the perfect recipe for the romantic air around the Valentine's Day. The fabulous music score, amazing locations and great picturisation makes it a visual treat which doesn't let the slow pace affect the movie watching experience in any way."
