= Bekhayali =

2019 Hindi film song

- Official song cover

Song by Sachet Tandon and Arijit Singh (Arijit Singh Version)

from the album Kabir Singh
- Language: Hindi
- English title: Without thoughts/Barefaced
- Released: 24 May 2019
- Studio: Forest Studios
- Genre: Soundtrack
- Length: 6:12
- Label: T-Series
- Composer: Sachet–Parampara
- Lyricist: Irshad Kamil
- Producers: Kalyan Baruah; Sachet–Parampara

Kabir Singh track listing
- 1. "Bekhayali"; 2. "Kaise Hua"; 3. "Tujhe Kitna Chahne Lage"; 4. "Mere Sohneya"; 5. "Tera Ban Jaunga"; 6. "Yeh Aaina"; 7. "Pehla Pyaar"; 8. "Bekhayali (Arijit Singh Version)"; 9. "Tujhe Kitna Chahein Aur" (Film Version)

Music video
- "Bekhayali 12" Sachet Tandon on YouTube

Bekhayali (transl. Without thoughts) is a Hindi song from the 2019 romantic film Kabir Singh, sung by Arijit Singh and Sachet Tandon composed by Sachet–Parampara and penned by Irshad Kamil.

== Background ==
Liking Sachet–Parampara's work in Batti Gul Meter Chalu, Shahid Kapoor arranged for the duo's meeting with director Sandeep Reddy Vanga and the producers of Kabir Singh. "We were told to create a song that would be main song of the story with five emotions, because it had to capture the whole story. Vanga already had a song in his mind for the film. The new song had to be that good, which could overpower the earlier one, and he should feel it was also going with the narrative", says Sachet. A rap version of the song has been sung by Uttarakhand based rapper Void (Gaurav Mankoti aka Gaurav Void)

== Personnel ==
The song "Bekhayali" has been sung by Sachet Tandon and the music is composed by Sachet–Parampara and lyrics are written by Irshad Kamil. The music producers are Kalyan Baruah and Sachet–Parampara with acoustic guitar by Rhythm Shaw and electric guitars by Kalyan Baruah. The song was recorded at Forest Studios and mixed & mastered by Aftab Khan at HeadRoom Studios. Vatsal Chevli assisted in mixing. The second version of the song is sung by Arijit Singh.

== Music video ==
The music video was released on 19 June 2019 by T-Series on YouTube. It has been viewed more than 149 million times since the day of its release on YouTube. The second version of the song sung by Arijit Singh has been viewed more than 34 million times on YouTube.

== Reception ==
Sachet's Version was a chartbuster even before its release, with several cover versions available on YouTube. Suryakant Singh of Mumbai Press praising music and lyrics finds the song high on emotions with fans relating with it.
