= Kabir Singh =

2019 Indian film by Sandeep Reddy Vanga

- Theatrical release poster
- Directed by: Sandeep Reddy Vanga
- Screenplay by: Sandeep Reddy Vanga
- Dialogues by: Siddharth–Garima
- Based on: Arjun Reddy by Sandeep Reddy Vanga
- Produced by: Murad Khetani; Ashwin Varde; Bhushan Kumar; Krishan Kumar
- Starring: Shahid Kapoor; Kiara Advani
- Cinematography: Santhana Krishnan Ravichandran
- Edited by: Aarif Sheikh; Sandeep Reddy Vanga
- Music by: Score: Harshavardhan Rameshwar; Songs: Mithoon; Amaal Mallik; Vishal Mishra; Sachet–Parampara; Akhil Sachdeva
- Production companies: T-Series Films; Cine1 Studios
- Distributed by: AA Films
- Release date: 21 June 2019
- Running time: 172 minutes
- Country: India
- Language: Hindi
- Budget: ₹60 crore
- Box office: ₹379 crore

Kabir Singh is a 2019 Indian Hindi-language romantic drama film co-written, co-edited and directed by Sandeep Reddy Vanga in his Hindi cinema debut, and jointly produced by Bhushan Kumar and Krishan Kumar under T-Series Films and Murad Khetani and Ashwin Varde under Cine1 Studios. A remake of Vanga's own Telugu film Arjun Reddy (2017), it stars Shahid Kapoor as the titular protagonist, a surgeon, who spirals into self-destruction when his girlfriend, played by Kiara Advani, is forced to marry someone else.

Principal photography for Kabir Singh began in October 2018 and ended in March 2019. The film was theatrically released on 21 June 2019 and received mixed reviews. Criticism was directed at the film for its themes of self destruction and substance abuse, while Kapoor's performance and the soundtrack received praise. Grossing over ₹379 crore, it became the second highest-grossing Hindi film of 2019, and Kapoor's highest grossing solo-lead release.

== Plot ==
Kabir Rajdheer Singh is the youngest son of a business tycoon Rajdheer Singh and studies at the Delhi Institute of Medical Sciences. He has a rebellious personality with anger issues that gained him the title of a bully. After having a brawl with the members of the opposing team in an inter-college football match, the dean asks him to either apologize or leave the college. Kabir chooses to leave but he stays back after meeting with first year student, Preeti Sikka.

Kabir and his friends announce to the student body that Kabir has exclusively claimed Preeti. Initially timid, she adjusts to his overbearing attitude and eventually reciprocates his feelings, developing a romantic and physical relationship with him. Kabir graduates with an MBBS degree and moves to Mussoorie for further education. Despite the distance, their relationship strengthens over the next few years. After Preeti graduates, she introduces Kabir to her conservative parents, but her father Harpal catches them kissing and throws Kabir out.

Harpal continues to oppose their relationship, despite Kabir's attempts to explain their love. Enraged, Kabir demands Preeti to choose between him and her family within the next six hours, or he will end their relationship. Preeti is later unable to reach him in time; feeling abandoned, Kabir injects himself with excessive morphine and remains unconscious for the next two days. Upon gaining consciousness, he learns that Preeti is being forced into an arranged marriage and gatecrashes the wedding party; Harpal has him beaten and arrested. After Kabir is released, Rajdheer ostracises him from the family for his antics.

With his friend Shiva's help, Kabir finds a rented flat and joins a private hospital as a surgeon. To cope with his emotions, he abuses drugs and alcohol and names his new pet dog Preeti. Within months, he becomes a successful surgeon and a high-functioning alcoholic both respected and feared by the hospital staff. His self-destructive behaviour and obsession worry his friends.

While hungover on a day off, Kabir is called in to perform an emergency surgery for which he unwillingly agrees. During the procedure, he collapses from dehydration. Suspicious, the hospital staff takes his blood samples, which contain traces of alcohol and cocaine. A case is filed against him and during an in-house hearing, a broken Kabir admits to alcoholism and violation of medical ethics. As a result, his medical licence is suspended for five years and he is evicted from his flat. The next morning, he learns of his grandmother’s death; at the funeral, he and his father reconcile. Kabir also resolves to quit his habits.

Some days later, Kabir spots a pregnant but dejected Preeti sitting in a park. He approaches and offers to raise the child with her if she is unhappy in her marriage. Initially silent, she bursts into angry tears, berates him for discarding her, and orders him to leave. Shiva then describes Kabir's obsession and self-destructive habits, which she was unaware of. Shocked, she confesses that she left her husband three days after the marriage and has been working in a clinic to support herself. Overcome with anger, especially after hearing about his casual affairs, she had refused to contact him. She reveals that her marriage was never consummated and that the child is Kabir's. They marry and reunite with their families, with Harpal apologising to them and the families coming together. The film ends showing Kabir and Preeti on a beach with their baby.

== Cast ==
- Shahid Kapoor as Dr. Kabir Rajdheer Singh
- Kiara Advani as Dr. Preeti Sikka
- Suresh Oberoi as Rajdheer Singh
- Arjan Bajwa as Karan Rajdheer Singh
- Soham Majumdar as Shiva Majumdar
- Nikita Dutta as Jiah Sharma
- Kamini Kaushal as Sadhna Kaur, Dr. Kabir‘s grandmother
- Adil Hussain as the medical college dean
- Kunal Thakur as Kamal
- Anusha Sampath as Keerti
- Vanita Kharat as Maid
- Swati Seth as Vidya
- Sanat Sawant as Ayush
- Anurag Arora as Harpal Sikka
- Vinay Sharma as Tomar "Sir"
- Amit Sharma as Amit
- Geetika Mehandru as Preeti's friend
- Suparna Marwah as Vishaka Sikka
- Dolly Minhas as Mrs. Rajdheer Singh
- Harssh A. Singh as Kabir's lawyer
- Vipul Deshpande as Hospital Director

== Production ==
=== Development ===
After the success of his debut, the 2017 Telugu film Arjun Reddy, writer and director Sandeep Reddy Vanga wanted to remake it in Hindi with Ranveer Singh. Vijay Devarakonda, who starred as Arjun in the original, was also initially considered for the Hindi remake, but turned down the offer. When talks with Singh didn't materialize either, Vanga approached Shahid Kapoor. However, producers Murad Khetani and Ashwin Varde of Cine1 Studios, who acquired the remake rights for Hindi, wanted Arjun Kapoor to play the male lead. Disappointed, Vanga said, "I've come to know that the remake rights of Arjun Reddy have been sold and it would star Arjun Kapoor. I am caught in a dilemma, as I've already locked Shahid for the role. It's a very embarrassing situation for me. I don't know how I'll face Shahid." In April 2018, however, it was officially announced that Shahid Kapoor would star, with Vanga set to direct.

Bhushan and Krishan Kumar of T-Series also produced the film. The dialogue was written by Siddharth–Garima. Santhana Krishnan Ravichandran was selected as the cinematographer and Aarif Sheikh as editor. Vanga was confident that the remake would be even more hard-hitting than the original: "When I made Arjun Reddy, I wasn't sure where to draw the line in terms of representation of certain things. I don't think I'd have to restrict myself when it comes to the Hindi version. I believe I'll have more freedom in Bollywood." The film's title Kabir Singh was announced on 25 October 2018.

=== Writing ===
Like the Telugu original, Kabir Singh too begins with a voiceover from the hero's paternal grandmother, but this time she is reciting a Kabir Doha. There are also geographical changes; the remake is set primarily in Delhi and Mumbai. Instead of caste conflict as in Arjun Reddy, the heroine's father takes offence to Kabir's smoking and not being a turban-wearing Sikh. For the remake, Vanga said he deployed less English than the original. "I've also tried to retain the colloquial quality in the Hindi dialogue." About the name Kabir Singh, he said, "There's a lot of melancholy in the name Kabir and a poetic side too." Vanga explained his reasons for choosing this as the film's title: "When we started work on the Hindi script, it was a very exciting journey. Kabir Singh, as the protagonist's name, came naturally, considering the character's graph. Kabir Singh has the same punch and madness of Arjun Reddy."

=== Casting ===
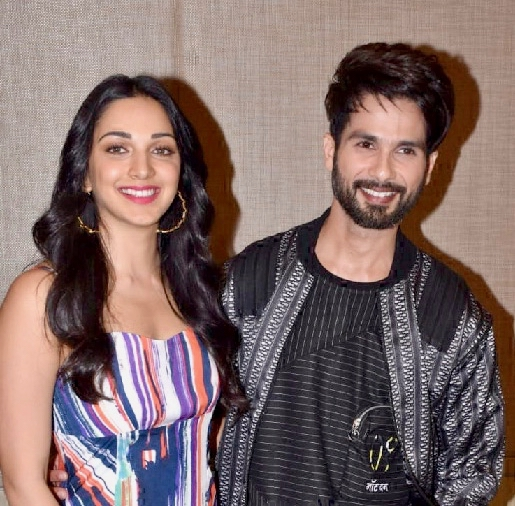
Shahid Kapoor with his co-star Kiara Advani at a promotional event for the film in 2019

Shahid Kapoor portrays the title character, Kabir Rajdheer Singh. Although Kiara Advani was Vanga's first choice for the female lead character Preeti, things failed to materialise. Tara Sutaria was then announced, but left when a delay in the production of her debut film Student of the Year 2 (2019) caused scheduling conflicts. The makers then went back to Advani to play the role of Preeti, Vanga cited her performance in M.S. Dhoni: The Untold Story (2016) as one of the reasons. According to Vanga, "Kiara epitomises the female character in the film to the T. She has the perfect combination of innocence (in terms of looks) and maturity (in terms of performance) that's so important for the character". Arjan Bajwa was initially uninterested in playing Kabir's elder brother Karan Singh, but accepted at the insistence of Vanga, for whom he was the only choice to play the character. Amit Sharma, who appeared as Amit in the Telugu original, was chosen to reprise his role.

=== Filming ===
The makers considered beginning the shoot in August, but it was delayed to September as Vanga wanted Kapoor to grow his beard more for the role. Principal photography eventually began on 21 October 2018 at Mumbai, four days before the announcement of the title. Filming also took place at Delhi and Mussoorie. Kapoor dons three different looks for the film. Regarding this he said, "There's a certain mind space and the present which the character is in and there's also the past which he has been part of. Along with this, there's the culmination. So, there are three distinct energies that the film needs." He went through substantial workouts to portray Kabir in two time periods; to achieve the character's "college boy" look, he shed 14 kilos of weight, and for the "puffy, groggy alcoholic" look, he worked out in a way that he would look "bigger but not muscular". Principal photography wrapped on 29 March 2019.

== Soundtrack ==
The soundtrack is composed by Mithoon, Amaal Mallik, Vishal Mishra, Sachet–Parampara (a duo consisting of Sachet Tandon and Parampara Thakur) and Akhil Sachdeva with lyrics written by Irshad Kamil, Manoj Muntashir, Kumaar and Mithoon. Harshavardhan Rameshwar composed the score. The song "Bekhayali" was popular even before its release, with several cover versions available on YouTube. The soundtrack was also physically released on vinyl record.

== Marketing ==
In a first-of-its-kind marketing deal, Kabir Singh became the first Bollywood film to have its very own theatre. As many as 15 PVR theatres in 15 cities across India would be renamed as "Kabir Singh Ka Theatre", with auditoriums reflecting the characteristics of the title character played by Kapoor.

== Release ==
Kabir Singh was released on 21 June 2019, worldwide on 3616 screens including 3123 screens in India. It is distributed by AA Films within India. Cinestaan AA Distributors is distributed through Magic Cloud Media & Entertainment in overseas. White Hill Studios is also distributed in North America. Khetani chose not to release the film in Pakistan, following the 2019 Pulwama attack. The film received an 'A' (adults only) certificate from the Central Board of Film Certification (CBFC) with the CBFC asking the makers to modify a scene where a character is seen snorting drugs, and also asked for insertion of static warning messages against drug abuse in all such scenes.

== Reception ==
=== Critical response ===
The film received mixed reviews, with criticism directed at it for allegedly glamorising misogyny and toxic masculinity. Ronak Kotecha of The Times of India rated the film 3.5 out of 5 stars, saying, "While Kabir Singh is a welcome change from stereotypical love stories, this kind of love affair needs some getting used to. Through his protagonist, Sandeep bets all his cards on his leading man, making sure you either love him or hate him, but you can't ignore him." Trade analyst and critic Taran Adarsh concurred with Kotecha on the film being an unconventional story and rated it three and half stars out of five. Declaring it "powerful", he praised Vanga's storytelling and Kapoor's performance. He felt that the film was a newfangled romantic tale.

Anna M. M. Vetticad of Firstpost found the film "insidious" in its writing of the protagonist and wrote, "Kabir Singh and its Telugu forebear Arjun Reddy must rank among the most disturbing examples of the obsessive stalker hero being glamourised by Indian cinema." Rating the film 1 out of 5 stars, she further elaborated that "it is not the depiction of reality that is objectionable here, it is precisely because violent, destructive misogynists do exist and women for centuries have suffered at their hands that it is deeply troubling when a film portrays such a person as cool, funny, and, as Kapoor puts it, a man with 'a good heart' who 'loves purely' and 'wears his emotions on his sleeve'." Rajeev Masand gave the film 2 out of 5 stars and said, "Kabir Singh is an unmistakably misogynistic film, but the sad part is that it's exactly these troubling portions that the filmmakers peddle as intense love." Priyanka Sinha Jha of News18, praising Kapoor's performance, Vanga's story and direction, rated the film with three and a half stars out of five. She found editing and soulful music of the film appealing. She felt that the film was a rare story of star-crossed lovers which moves the audience. In the end, She says, "Reddy despite a brooding despairing protagonist takes things many notches higher and makes it one helluva trippy ride." Devesh Sharma of Filmfare said, "At 172 minutes, the film is too long by modern standards. Thankfully, Vanga has gone for a non-linear mode of storytelling and going back and forth in the timeline does keep the viewer engrossed."

Shubhra Gupta of The Indian Express giving the film one-and-a-half stars out of five, opined, "Kabir Singh (protagonist) is all flourish, mostly surface. You see him going through the motions, but you never really feel for him. And that, right there, is the problem: not enough pay off for three hours of pain.". Raja Sen of Hindustan Times, agreeing with Gupta, gave one-and-a-half stars out of five and felt that it was the most misogynistic Indian film that had come in a long time. He praised the cinematography of Santhana Krishnan Ravichandran but criticised the other aspects of the film. He said, "Kabir Singh actually applauds its pathetic protagonist, and ends up an obnoxious celebration of toxic masculinity." Kunal Guha of Mumbai Mirror rated the film two-and-a-half stars out of five, feeling that trimming the script by forty minutes would have helped.

Sandipan Sharma, writing for The Federal, praised and defended the film, saying, "filmmakers should have the right to explore the mind of a flawed person." He slammed critics for accusing the film of "glorifying misogyny, portraying toxic masculinity, obsessive love, celebrating alcoholism, etc." He further added "If Kabir Singh were to inspire Indian men to turn into alcoholics, raging maniacs, would it be safe to assume that in a few years we'd see a full generation of youngsters inspired by biopics and our prime minister? [...] his tragi-comic story is so entertaining. Somewhere deep down it also reminds us of our own struggles, failures and flaws." Arnab Banerjee of Deccan Chronicle also rated the film 1.5 out of 5 stars, criticising it for misogyny but praising the performances of the supporting cast members including Majumdar, Bajwa, Dutta and Oberoi.

In response to criticism that Kabir Singh glorifies its eponymous hero's misogyny, Kapoor defended the character, saying, "There are all kinds of people in real life, including alpha-males who feel territorial entitlement, and I have played this character truthfully". Actor Manoj Bajpayee also defended the film, stressing on the futility of shutting down such films and indicating that censoring one film could lead to a trend of moral policing across various segments and potentially limit artistic expression. Filmmaker Anurag Kashyap defended the film, feeling it represented more than 70 to 80% of urban India, and that political correctness does not work all the time, particularly in cinema where making films with positive messages and love stories with happy endings has led to nowhere.

=== Box office ===
Kabir Singh's opening day domestic collection was ₹20.21 crore. This is the highest opening day collection for a Shahid Kapoor film. On the second day, the film collected ₹22.71 crore. On the third day, the film collected ₹27.91 crore.

As of 10 October 2019, with a gross of ₹331.24 crore in India and ₹47.78 crore overseas, the film has a worldwide gross collection of ₹379.2 crore.

Kabir Singh was the third highest grossing Bollywood film of 2019. Going by domestic net collection, the film is the 9th list of Hindi films with highest domestic net collection. It also became the first A-certified Indian film to gross over ₹ 200 crore in India.

== Home media ==
The film began streaming on Netflix from 19 September 2019.

== Accolades ==
Date of ceremony	Award	Category	Recipient(s) and nominee(s)	Result	Ref.
8 December 2019	Screen Awards	Best Film	Kabir Singh	Nominated	
8 December 2019	Screen Awards	Best Director	Sandeep Reddy Vanga	Nominated	
8 December 2019	Screen Awards	Best Actor	Shahid Kapoor	Nominated	
8 December 2019	Screen Awards	Entertainer of the Year (Shared with Ranveer Singh – Gully Boy)	Shahid Kapoor	Won	
8 December 2019	Screen Awards	Best Supporting Actor	Soham Majumdar	Nominated	
8 December 2019	Screen Awards	Best Supporting Actress	Kamini Kaushal	Won	
8 December 2019	Screen Awards	Best Music Director (Shared with Gully Boy)	Akhil Sachdeva; Amaal Mallik; Mithoon; Vishal Mishra; Sachet–Parampara	Won	
8 December 2019	Screen Awards	Best Male Playback Singer	Sachet Tandon ("Bekhayali")	Won	
15 February 2020	Filmfare Awards	Best Actor	Shahid Kapoor	Nominated	
15 February 2020	Filmfare Awards	Best Supporting Actress	Kamini Kaushal	Nominated	
15 February 2020	Filmfare Awards	Best Music Director (Shared with Gully Boy)	Akhil Sachdeva; Amaal Mallik; Mithoon; Vishal Mishra; Sachet–Parampara	Won	
15 February 2020	Filmfare Awards	Best Lyricist	Irshad Kamil ("Bekhayali")	Nominated	
15 February 2020	Filmfare Awards	Best Lyricist	Mithoon ("Tujhe Kitna Chahne Lage")	Nominated	
15 February 2020	Filmfare Awards	Best Male Playback Singer	Sachet Tandon ("Bekhayali")	Nominated	
15 February 2020	Filmfare Awards	Best Female Playback Singer	Shreya Ghoshal ("Ye Aaina")	Nominated	
15 February 2020	Filmfare Awards	Best Female Playback Singer	Parampara Thakur ("Mere Sohneya")	Nominated	
19 February 2020	Mirchi Music Awards	Song of The Year	"Tujhe Kitna Chahne Lage"	Nominated	
19 February 2020	Mirchi Music Awards	Album of The Year	Kabir Singh	Nominated	
19 February 2020	Mirchi Music Awards	Listeners' Choice Album of the Year	Kabir Singh	Nominated	
19 February 2020	Mirchi Music Awards	Listeners' Choice Song of the Year	"Bekhayali"	Won	
19 February 2020	Mirchi Music Awards	Male Vocalist of The Year	Arijit Singh ("Tujhe Kitna Chahne Lage")	Nominated	
19 February 2020	Mirchi Music Awards	Female Vocalist of The Year	Parampara Thakur ("Mere Sohneya")	Nominated	
19 February 2020	Mirchi Music Awards	Music Composer of The Year	Mithoon ("Tujhe Kitna Chahne Lage")	Nominated	
19 February 2020	Mirchi Music Awards	Music Composer of The Year	Sachet–Parampara ("Bekhayali")	Nominated	
19 February 2020	Mirchi Music Awards	Lyricist of The Year	Irshad Kamil ("Bekhayali")	Nominated	
13 March 2020	Zee Cine Awards	Best Music Director	Akhil Sachdeva; Amaal Mallik; Mithoon; Vishal Mishra; Sachet–Parampara	Won	
24 November 2021	International Indian Film Academy Awards	Best Film	Kabir Singh	Won	
24 November 2021	International Indian Film Academy Awards	Best Director	Sandeep Reddy Vanga	Nominated	
24 November 2021	International Indian Film Academy Awards	Best Actor	Shahid Kapoor	Won	
24 November 2021	International Indian Film Academy Awards	Best Music Director	Akhil Sachdeva; Amaal Mallik; Mithoon; Vishal Mishra; Sachet–Parampara	Won	
24 November 2021	International Indian Film Academy Awards	Best Male Playback Singer	Sachet Tandon ("Bekhayali")	Nominated	
24 November 2021	International Indian Film Academy Awards	Best Female Playback Singer	Shreya Ghoshal ("Ye Aaina")	Won	
24 November 2021	International Indian Film Academy Awards	Best Lyricist	Irshad Kamil ("Bekhayali")	Nominated	
24 November 2021	International Indian Film Academy Awards	Best Lyricist	Kumaar ("Tera Ban Jaunga")	Nominated	
