= Sachet–Parampara =

Indian music composer duo

- Genre: Film soundtrack
- Occupations: Music Composer; Record Producer; Lyricist-Composer; Instrumentalist
- Years active: 2015–present
- Label: T-Series
- Members: Sachet Tandon; Parampara Thakur

Sachet–Parampara is an Indian music composer, lyricist and singer duo consisting of husband and wife Sachet Tandon and Parampara Thakur. They are known for their work in Hindi films including Toilet: Ek Prem Katha (2017), Bhoomi (2017), Yamla Pagla Deewana: Phir Se (2018), Batti Gul Meter Chalu (2018), Pal Pal Dil Ke Paas (2019), Kabir Singh (2019), Tanhaji (2020) and Jersey (2022). Also known for music video "Chhor Denge" which viewed in YouTube as on 9 August 2024 more than 486 million times, in addition to their work as a music composer duo.

== Early life ==
Sachet Tandon and Parampara Thakur were born in Darbhanga, Bihar in 1989 and Delhi in 1992, respectively. After becoming finalist of India's first season of reality show The Voice India in 2015, the duo was formed the following year. Sachet completed his schooling from St. Fidelis College and served as a music teacher in CMS gomti nagar lucknow. Sachet and Parampara completed their education from Lucknow University in Lucknow and Lady Shri Ram College in Delhi respectively.

== Personal life ==
Sachet Tandon and Parampara Thakur got married on 27 November 2020.

== Filmography ==
This list contains songs that are sung/composed by Sachet Tandon, Parampara Thakur, or both.

#	Year	Film	Song	Singer(s)	Composer(s)	Lyricist(s)	Notes	Ref.
1	2017	Toilet: Ek Prem Katha	"Subah Ki Train"	Sachet–Parampara	Sachet–Parampara	Sachet–Parampara		
2	2017	Bhoomi	"Mere Baad"	Payal Dev	Sachet–Parampara	Sachet–Parampara		
4	2018	Yamla Pagla Deewana Phir Se	"Nazarbattu"	Sachet Tandon	Sachet–Parampara	Pulkit Rishi		
5	2018	Batti Gul Meter Chalu	"Hard Hard"	Mika Singh, Sachet Tandon, Prakriti Kakar	Sachet–Parampara	Siddharth–Garima		
6	2018	Batti Gul Meter Chalu	"Har Har Gange"	Arijit Singh	Sachet–Parampara	Siddharth–Garima		
6	2019	Kabir Singh	"Bekhayali"	Sachet Tandon	Sachet–Parampara	Irshad Kamil		
7	2019	Kabir Singh	"Mere Sohneya"	Sachet–Parampara	Sachet–Parampara	Irshad Kamil		
8	2019	Kabir Singh	"Bekhayali"(Arijit Singh version)	Arijit Singh	Sachet–Parampara	Irshad Kamil		
9	2019	Arjun Patiala	"Sachiyan Mohabbatan"	Sachet Tandon	Sachin–Jigar	Priya Saraiya		
10	2019	Jabariya Jodi	"Khwabfaroshi"	Sachet–Parampara	Sachet–Parampara	Siddharth–Garima		
11	2019	Saaho	"Psycho Saiyaan"	Sachet Tandon, Dhvani Bhanushali	Tanishk Bagchi	Tanishk Bagchi, MellowD		
12	2019	Pal Pal Dil Ke Paas	"Aadha Bhi Zyada	Hansraj Raghuwanshi, Karan Deol	Sachet–Parampara	Siddharth–Garima		
13	2019	Pal Pal Dil Ke Paas	"Pal Pal Dil Ke Paas"	Arijit Singh, Parampara Thakur	Sachet–Parampara	Siddharth–Garima		
14	2019	Pal Pal Dil Ke Paas	"Ishq Chaliya"	Sachet–Parampara	Sachet–Parampara	Siddharth–Garima		
15	2019	Pal Pal Dil Ke Paas	"Dil Uda Patanga"	Sachet–Parampara	Sachet–Parampara	Siddharth–Garima		
16	2019	Pal Pal Dil Ke Paas	"Maa Ka Mann"	Sachet–Parampara	Sachet–Parampara	Siddharth–Garima		
17	2019	Pal Pal Dil Ke Paas	"Pal Pal Dil Ke Paas"(Celebration)	Sachet–Parampara	Sachet–Parampara	Siddharth–Garima		
18	2019	Pal Pal Dil Ke Paas	"Pal Pal Dil Ke Paas"(Version 2)	Sachet–Parampara	Sachet–Parampara	Siddharth–Garima		
19	2019	Pal Pal Dil Ke Paas	"Sunn Le Rabb"	Sachet Tandon	Sachet–Parampara	Siddharth–Garima		
20	2019	Pal Pal Dil Ke Paas	"Pal Pal Dil Ke Paas"(Palak version)	Palak Muchhal	Sachet–Parampara	Siddharth–Garima		
21	2019	Pati Patni Aur Woh	"Dilbara"	Sachet–Parampara	Sachet–Parampara	Navi Ferozpurwala		
22	2019	Pati Patni Aur Woh	"Dilbara"(B Praak version)	B Praak	Sachet–Parampara	Navi Ferozpurwala		
23	2020	Tanhaji	"Ghamand Kar"	Sachet–Parampara	Sachet–Parampara	Anil Verma		
24	2020	Tanhaji	"Tinak Tinak"	Harshdeep Kaur	Sachet–Parampara	Anil Verma		
25	2020	Street Dancer 3D	"Muqabla"	Yash Narvekar, Parampara Thakur	A.R. Rahman, Tanishk Bagchi	Tanishk Bagchi, Shabbir Ahmed		
26	2020	Street Dancer 3D	"Muqabla - Telugu"	Yash Narvekar, Parampara Thakur	A.R. Rahman, Tanishk Bagchi	Ramajogayya Sastry	Telugu dubbed version	
27	2020	Street Dancer 3D	"Muqabla -Tamil"	Yash Narvekar, Parampara Thakur	A.R. Rahman, Tanishk Bagchi	Veeramani Kannan	Tamil dubbed version	
28	2020	Malang	"Humraah"	Sachet Tandon	The Fusion Project	Kunaal Verma		
29	2020	Baaghi 3	"Faaslon Mein"	Sachet Tandon	Sachet–Parampara	Shabbir Ahmed		
30	2020	Gulabi Lens	"Gulabi Lens - Title Track"	Sachet Tandon	Sachet–Parampara	Garima Wahalhi	Short film	
31	2021	Shiddat	"Barbadiyan"	Sachet Tandon, Nikhita Gandhi, Madhubanti Bagchi	Sachin–Jigar	Priya Saraiya		
32	2021	Shiddat	"Jug Jug Jeeve"	Sachet–Parampara	Sachin–Jigar	Kausar Munir		
33	2021	Hum Do Hamare Do	"Mauj-E-Karam"	Sachet–Parampara	Sachin–Jigar	Shellee		
34	2021	Satyameva Jayate 2	"Maa Sherwali"	Payal Dev, Sachet Tandon	Manoj Muntashir	Payal Dev		
35	2022	Hurdang	"Khwaab Khwaab"	Sachet Tandon	Sachet–Parampara	Irshad Kamil		
36	2022	Hurdang	"Halla Sheri"	Sachet Tandon	Sachet–Parampara	Irshad Kamil		
37	2022	Hurdang	"Padhai Likhai"	Parampara Tandon	Sachet–Parampara	Irshad Kamil		
38	2022	Jersey	"Mehram"	Sachet Tandon	Sachet–Parampara	Shellee		
39	2022	Jersey	"Maiyya Mainu"	Sachet Tandon	Sachet–Parampara	Shellee		
40	2022	Jersey	"Baliye Re"	Sachet–Parampara, Stebin Ben, MellowD	Sachet–Parampara	Shellee		
41	2022	Jersey	"Jind Meriye"	Sachet Tandon	Sachet–Parampara	Shellee		
42	2022	Jersey	"Jind Meriye"(Javed Ali version)	Javed Ali	Sachet–Parampara	Shellee		
43	2022	Jersey	"Maiyya Mainu"(Sakshi Holkar version)	Sakshi Holkar	Sachet–Parampara	Shellee		
44	2022	Toolsidas Junior	"Udd Chala"	Sachet Tandon, Ujjwal Kashyap	Daniel B George	Swanand Kirkire		
45	2022	Lover	"Lover - Title Track"	Sachet Tandon	Snipr	Babbu	Punjabi film	
46	2022	Nazar Andaaz	"Lootere Aa Gaye"	Sachet Tandon, Mohammed Danish	Vishal Mishra	Raj Shekhar		
47	2022	Nazar Andaaz	"Jadoo"	Parampara Tandon	Vishal Mishra	Raj Shekhar		
48	2023	Gumraah	"Gumraah - Title Track"	Sachet–Parampara	Abhijit Vaghani	Bhrigu Parashar		
49	2023	Adipurush	"Ram Siya Ram"	Sachet–Parampara	Sachet–Parampara	Manoj Muntashir		
50	2023	Adipurush	"Ram Sita Ram - Telugu"	Karthik, Parampara Tandon	Sachet–Parampara	Saraswathi Puthra Ramajogayya Sastry	Telugu dubbed version	
51	2023	Adipurush	"Ram Siya Ram - Tamil"	Karthik, Parampara Tandon	Sachet–Parampara	G. Muralidaren	Tamil dubbed version	
52	2023	Adipurush	"Ram Siya Ram - Kannada"	Karthik, Parampara Tandon	Sachet–Parampara	Pramod Maravanthe	Kannada dubbed version	
53	2023	Adipurush	"Ram Siya Ram - Malayalam"	Karthik, Parampara Tandon	Sachet–Parampara	Mankombu Gopalakrishnan	Malayalam dubbed version	
54	2023	Zara Hatke Zara Bachke	"Sanjha"	Sachet Tandon, Shilpa Rao	Sachin–Jigar	Amitabh Bhattacharya		
55	2023	Satyaprem Ki Katha	"Sun Sajni"	Meet Bros, Parampara Tandon, Piyush Mehroliyaa	Meet Bros	Kumaar	Only Parampara Tandon	
56	2023	Rocky Aur Rani Kii Prem Kahaani	"Kudmayi"	Sachet Tandon	Pritam	Amitabh Bhattacharya		
57	2023	Yaariyan 2	"Simroon Tera Naam"	Sachet Tandon	Manan Bhardwaj			
58	2023	Yaariyan 2	"Heer Bhi Royi"	Parampara Tandon	Manan Bhardwaj			
59	2023	Sukhee	"Meethi Boliyan"	Sachet Tandon	Arko Pravo Mukherjee	Rashmi Virag		
60	2023	Starfish	"Bairaage"	Sachet–Parampara	Sachet–Parampara	Kumaar		
61	2024	Kuch Khattaa Ho Jaay	"Jeena Sikhaya"	Guru Randhawa, Parampara Tandon	Sachet–Parampara	Kumaar		
62	2024	Srikanth	"Tumhe Hi Apna Maana Hai"	Sachet–Parampara	Sachet–Parampara	Yogesh Dubey		
63	2024	The Family Star	"Kalyani Tera Hoon Main"	Sachet–Parampara	Gopi Sundar	Rashmi Virag	Hindi dubbed version	
64	2024	Phir Aayi Hasseen Dillruba	"Haste Haste"	Sachet Tandon	Sachet–Parampara	Raj Shekhar	Netflix film	
65	2024	Phir Aayi Hasseen Dillruba	"Kya Haal Hai"	Sachet–Parampara	Sachet–Parampara	Kumaar	Netflix film	
66	2024	Vicky Vidya Ka Woh Wala Video	"Mere Mehboob"	Sachet Tandon, Shilpa Rao	Sachin-Jigar	Priya Saraiya		
67	2024	Do Patti	"Raanjhan"	Parampara Tandon	Sachet–Parampara	Kausar Munir	Netflix film	
68	2024	Do Patti	"Jaadu"	Sachet Tandon	Sachet–Parampara	Kausar Munir	Netflix film	
69	2024	Do Patti	"Thaaein Thaaein"	Sachet Tandon, Shreya Ghoshal	Sachet–Parampara	Kausar Munir	Netflix film	
70	2024	Do Patti	"Maiyya"	Sachet–Parampara	Sachet–Parampara	Kausar Munir	Netflix film	
71	2024	Bhool Bhulaiyaa 3	"Beiraada"	Sachet–Parampara	Sachet–Parampara	Som		
72	2025	Nadaaniyan	"Ishq Mein"	Sachet Tandon, Asees Kaur	Sachin-Jigar	Amitabh Bhattacharya	Netflix film	
73	2025	Raid 2	"Nasha"	Jasmine Sandlas, Sachet Tandon, Divya Kumar, Sumontho Mukherjee	White Noise Collectives	Jaani		
74	2025	Raid 2	"Kamle"	Sachet–Parampara		Kausar Munir		
75	2025	Metro... In Dino	"Dhaagena Tinak Dhin"	Sachet Tandon, Akasa Singh	Pritam	Mayur Puri		
76	2025	Saiyaara	"Humsafar"	Sachet–Parampara		Irshad Kamil, Prashant Pandey		
77	2025	War 2	"Janaab-e-Aali"	Sachet Tandon, Saaj Bhatt	Pritam	Amitabh Bhattacharya		
78	2025	Baaghi 4	"Guzaara"	Josh Brar, Parampara Tandon	Agaazz, Josh Brar & Salamat Ali Matoi	Kumaar, Jagdeep Warring, Josh Brar		
79	2025	Baaghi 4	"Rona Sikha Diya"	Parampara Tandon	Gourov Dasgupta	Farhan Memon		
80	2025	Ek Chatur Naar	"Gulabi Saawariya"	Sachet Tandon, Shilpa Rao	Abhijeet Srivastava	Shayra Apoorva		
81	2025	Sunny Sanskari Ki Tulsi Kumari	"Tu Hai Meri"	Sachet Tandon, Parampara Tandon	Sachet–Parampara	Kausar Munir		
82	2026	The RajaSaab	"Rebel Saab"	Sachet Tandon, Blaaze	Thaman S	Kumaar	Hindi dubbed version	
83	2026	Border 2	"Ishq Da Chehra"	Diljit Dosanjh, Sachet Tandon, Parampara Tandon	Sachet–Parampara	Kausar Munir		
84	2026	Assi	"Mann Hawa"	Mohit Chauhan, Parampara Tandon, Rochak Kohli	Rochak Kohli	Kumaar		
85	2026	Ramayana: Part 1	"Main Ram"	Sachet Tandon	Prateek Walia, JAM8	Kumar Vishwas		

== Albums/singles ==
This list contains songs that are sung/composed by Sachet Tandon or Parampara Thakur or both.
As on 9 August 2024, song "Chhor Denge" has been viewed in YouTube 486 million times, picturised on Nora Fatehi & Ehan Bhat.

Year	Album(s)/Single(s)	Singer(s)/Co-Singer(s)	Lyrics	Music	Length	Notes
2019	Jhansa	Sachet Tandon, Parampara Thakur	Vikas, Sachet–Parampara	Sachet–Parampara	4:28	
2019	Rani Teri Vodka	Sachet Tandon, Parampara Thakur	Navi Ferozpurwala	Sachet–Parampara	2:56	
2019	Nai Jaana	Tulsi Kumar, Sachet Tandon	Nirmaan	Tanishk Bagchi	3:47	
2020	Swag Se Solo	Sachet Tandon	Vayu	Tanishk Bagchi	1:48	
2020	Bewafai	Sachet Tandon	Manoj Muntashir	Rochak Kohli	3:54	
2020	Kandhe Ka Woh Til	Sachet Tandon	Kumaar	Manan Bhardwaj	3:32	
2020	Tanhaai	Tulsi Kumar	Sayeed Quadri	Sachet–Parampara	5:18	
2021	Mehendi Wale Haath	Guru Randhawa	Sayeed Quadri	Sachet–Parampara	3:40	
2021	Chhor Denge	Parampara Thakur	Yogesh Dubey	Sachet–Parampara	4:17	
2021	Aur Pyaar Karna Hai	Guru Randhawa, Neha Kakkar	Sayeed Quadri	Sachet–Parampara	4:11	
2021	Patli Kamariya	Tanishk Bagchi, Sukh-E, Parampara Thakur	Tanishk Bagchi		2:57	
2021	Is Qadar	Darshan Raval, Tulsi Kumar	Sayeed Quadri	Sachet–Parampara	3:50	
2021	Chura Liya	Sachet Tandon, Parampara Thakur	Irshad Kamil	Sachet–Parampara	4:31	
2021	Shiv Tandav Strotam (Har Har Shiv Shankar)	Sachet Tandon, Parampara Thakur	Yogesh Dubey - Traditional	Sachet–Parampara	05:52	
2021	Shri Amarnath Ishwaram	Sachet Tandon	Nitishwar Kumar	Aman Pant	05:16	
2021	Ishq Mein	Sachet Tandon	Kumaar, Attaullah Khan Esakhelvi	Meet Bros, Attaullah Khan Esakhelvi	5:13	
2021	Gajanan	Sachet Tandon	Shabbir Ahmed, Ankita Raj, Shamim Ahmed Shaikh	Shabbir Ahmed	4:21	
2021	Shiv Panchakshar Stotra	Sachet Tandon, Parampara Thakur	Sachet, Parampara - Traditional	Sachet–Parampara	3:25	
2022	Khwaab Khwaab	Sachet Tandon	Irshad Kamil	Sachet–Parampara	3:37	
2022	Takdaa Rawaan	Sachet–Parampara	Kumaar	Sachet–Parampara	2:40	
2022	Malang Sajna	Sachet–Parampara	Kumaar	Sachet–Parampara	2:41	
2023	Deewani	Sachet–Parampara	Kumaar	Sachet–Parampara	2:54	
2023	Chandni	Sachet–Parampara	Jaani	B Praak	4:08	

== Awards ==
Award	Title	Recipient
IIFA Popular Awards Winner 2020	Best Music Direction	Kabir Singh
Filmfare Awards Winner 2020	Best Music Album	Kabir Singh
Mirchi Music Awards Listener's Choice Awards Winner 2020	Best Song of the Year	Song: Bekhayali
Mirchi Music Awards Listener's Choice Awards Winner 2020	Album of the Year	Kabir Singh
Screen Awards Screen Awards Winner 2020	Best Music	Kabir Singh
Zee Cine Awards Jury's Choice Awards Winner 2020	Best Music	Kabir Singh
Star Screen Awards	Best Music Album Winner	Kabir Singh
Star Screen Awards Best Playback Singer Winner	Sachet Tandon	Bekhayali
