= Tujhe Kitna Chahne Lage =

2019 film song from Kabir Singh

- Official song cover

Song by Arijit Singh

from the album Kabir Singh
- Language: Hindi
- Published: 31 May 2019
- Studio: Living Water Music
- Genre: Ballad Soundtrack
- Length: 4:44
- Label: T-Series
- Songwriter: Mithoon

Kabir Singh track listing
- 1. "Bekhayali"; 2. "Kaise Hua"; 3. "Tujhe Kitna Chahne Lage"; 4. "Mere Sohneya"; 5. "Tera Ban Jaunga"; 6. "Yeh Aaina"; 7. "Pehla Pyaar"; 8. "Bekhayali (Arijit Singh Version)"; 9. "Tujhe Kitna Chahein Aur" (Film Version)
External videos
- "Tuje Kitna Chahne Lage" on YouTube

"Tujhe Kitna Chahne Lage" (transl. I've started to love you a lot) is a Hindi ballad from the soundtrack album for the 2019 film Kabir Singh. (Note: Another version of the song, titled "Tujhe Kitna Chahein Aur" and sung by Jubin Nautiyal, was used in the film.) The song was written and composed by Mithoon, and is sung by Arijit Singh.

The song topped a number of music charts in India in July 2019. It also did well on Radio Mirchi, where it was listed at number 3 on the Radio Mirchi website's Top 20 song chart between 6 and 19 July. On the Musicplus charts, the song spent two weeks at number 1 between 26 July and 8 August.

== Production ==
"Tujhe Kitna Chahne Lage" was composed by Mithoon for the soundtrack album of the film Kabir Singh, and sung by Arijit Singh. The music producer is Godswill Mergulhao, with drum beats by Bobby Shrivastava.

The song was recorded at Living Water Music, and was mixed and mastered by Eric Pillai at Future Sound Of Bombay. Another version of the song, titled "Tujhe Kitna Chahein Aur" and sung by Jubin Nautiyal, was used in the film.

Singh's version was released on the soundtrack album while Nautiyal's version was used in the film, while also releasing later on the soundtrack album.

== Music video ==
The music video was released by T-Series on YouTube on 19 June 2019, attracting 20 million views the same day. It has been viewed more than 74 million times (Note: The official lyrical video posted by T-Series got 42M views, taking the total views across YouTube to over 107M.) since its release.

The filmmakers have described the song as expressing "the phase of love and longing after falling apart". The initially released video was two minutes long, and mostly featured actor Shahid Kapoor shown as a new and younger-looking avatar. Shahid plays the title role of Kabir, the lead protagonist. Kabir's appearance in the music video reflects one of the character's personas. The video shows Shahid Kapoor clean-shaven, for the first time since his appearance in Jab We Met in 2007. The video depicts the story of two lovers. Actress Kiara Advani appears in only a few scenes. Kabir Singh, a surgeon, is portrayed as a sad figure, drinking and smoking to excess after his separation from Preeti. Shahid Kapoor shows him unable to forget Preeti.

He visits beautiful landscapes on his bike. In the music video, past romantic scenes are paralleled with scenes in the present. The song shows Kabir riding a motorcycle to meet Preeti, followed by a romantic kiss between them. After a futile attempt to get over the separation, Kabir becomes an alcoholic. He is shown intoxicated and alone.

== Charts ==
In July 2019, "Tujhe Kitna Chahne Lage" topped various music charts in India, including those of Musicplus. It also did well on Radio Mirchi. The song spent two weeks at number 1 on the Musicplus charts between 26 July and 8 August 2019. For two weeks, between 6 and 19 July 2019, it was listed at number 3 in the Top 20 Songs chart published by Radio Mirchi on its website. As at 12 October 2019, the song had remained on its top 20 chart for 17 weeks.

NDTV reported on the song's release, saying that viewers were "guaranteed to play it on loop". News18 reported that it was the second most-viewed song from the movie Kabir Singh. On the T-Series YouTube channel, "Tujhe Kitna Chahne Lage" was streamed 96 million times in the first month of the film's release, placing it second among the songs from the Kabir Singh soundtrack.

Spotify announced that "Tujhe Kitna Chahne Lage" was the second most-streamed song of 2019 in India. Another song from the same film, "Bekhayali", was third.

== Reception ==
India Today reported that "Tujhe Kitna Chahne Lage" was a sure candidate as "the next anthem for broken hearts". It described the song as an "off-beat sad-romantic number" that was different from other conventional songs of similar type. The Times of India said: "the song very beautifully captures the emotions of the one smitten by love and at the same time, describes the pain of losing that someone special." Scroll.in characterised Kabir Singh's songs, including "Tujhe Kitna Chahne Lage", as "saccharine rock".

DNA India reported that the song was "a soulful heart-wrenching melody".

"Tujhe Kitna Chahne Lage" is called a "tearjerker" in the title of another Scroll.in review, in which the song is described as a "pensive ballad that speaks of the hero's heartbreak". The Statesman called the song a "sad romantic track", and "an off-beat-romantic number". SpotboyE called the song "melancholic yet beautiful".
