= CJ (rapper) =

American rapper

- Born: Christopher Daniel Soriano Jr. January 4, 1997 (age 29); Staten Island, New York, U.S.
- Genres: Hip hop; trap; drill
- Occupations: Rapper
- Years active: 2011–2021
- Labels: AWAL; Cruz Control; Warner

Christopher Daniel Soriano Jr. (born January 4, 1997), better known by his stage name CJ, is an American rapper and singer. He is best known for his 2020 breakout single "Whoopty", which peaked at number 3 on the UK Singles Chart and at number 10 on the US Billboard Hot 100. The song was later included on his debut EP, Loyalty Over Royalty, released in February 2021.

== Career ==
Soriano began rapping as a hobby at the age of 9 and began recording and uploading songs to YouTube and SoundCloud at the age of 14.

In July 2020, Soriano self-released his first commercial breakthrough single, titled "Whoopty". The song contains a sample from Arijit Singh's "Sanam Re", with CJ rapping over the beat that he found on YouTube (later the rights were cleared). The song peaked at number 10 on the US Billboard Hot 100 in February 2021, and number 3 in the UK. He also reached the top of the Billboard Emerging Artists chart. He later signed a record deal with Warner Records and his uncle, record executive, James Cruz, on his record label, called Cruz Control Entertainment. He stated that various labels reached out to him, however, Warner had the "best situation". On January 26, 2021, CJ released the single, titled "Bop", the follow-up to "Whoopty". His debut extended play, titled Loyalty Over Royalty was released on February 19, 2021. It was executive produced by French Montana. The extended play featured his final single "Lil Freak" (featuring DreamDoll).

By 2023, XXL magazine described CJ as a one hit wonder, and noted rumors surrounding him being an industry plant, due to his uncle's industry connections.

== Artistry ==
Soriano's music is influenced from various artist such as 50 Cent, Jay-Z, Wu-Tang Clan, and Pop Smoke.

== Personal life ==
Soriano is of Puerto Rican descent.

== Discography ==
=== Extended plays ===
List of EPs with selected details and chart positions
Title	Details	Peak positions	
Title	Details	US	CAN
Loyalty Over Royalty	Released: February 19, 2021; Label: Warner, Cruz Control; Format: Digital download, streaming	56	35

=== Singles ===
Title	Year	Peak positions										Certifications	Album
Title	Year	US	AUS	AUT	FRA	NLD	NOR	NZ	SWE	SWI	UK	Certifications	Album
"Whoopty"	2020	10	13	12	26	12	10	18	16	10	3	RIAA: 2× Platinum; ARIA: Platinum; MC: 2× Platinum	Loyalty Over Royalty
"Bop" (Note: The quotation marks are part of the title.)	2021	—	—	—	—	—	—	— (Note: ""Bop"" did not enter the NZ Top 40 Singles Chart, but peaked at number 18 on the NZ Hot Singles Chart.)	—	—	—		Loyalty Over Royalty
"La Mamá de la Mamá" (with El Alfa and Chael Produciendo featuring El Cherry Scom)	2021	— (Note: "La Mamá de la Mamá" did not chart on the Billboard Hot 100, but peaked at number 23 on the Bubbling Under Hot 100.)	—	—	—	—	—	—	—	—	—		Dembow Worldwide Hits Teteo 42
