= Mithoon =

Indian music composer and singer (born 1985)

Mithoon Sharma
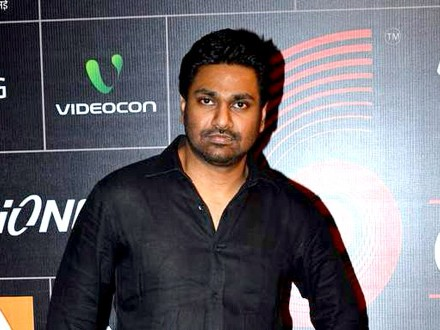
- Mithoon at the 4th Gionee Star Global Indian Music Academy Awards

Background information
- Also known as: Mithoon
- Born: Mithun Sharma; 11 January 1985 (age 41); Mumbai, Maharashtra, India
- Genres: Film score, Filmi, Indian classical, Ballads
- Occupations: Music composer; playback singer; lyricist
- Instruments: Piano and keyboard
- Years active: 2005–present
- Spouse: Palak Muchhal (m. 2022)

Mithun Sharma, also known as Mithoon, is an Indian music composer, lyricist, and playback singer known for his work in Hindi films.

Mithoon composed the Hindi song "Tum Hi Ho" from the 2013 romantic film Aashiqui 2. Mithoon received the Filmfare Award for Best Music Director, and in 2014 received a nomination for Filmfare Award for Best Lyricist in the 59th Filmfare Awards. He wrote and composed one of the most streamed Hindi songs on YouTube, "Sanam Re". The song was honoured with the award of "Most Streamed Song of 2016" at the Global Indian Music Academy Awards. Mithoon launched the singer Arijit Singh in 2011 with Mohammad Irfan Ali co-singer with the song Phir Mohabbat.

== Early life ==
Mithoon was born into a family of musicians. His grandfather, Pandit Ram Prasad Sharma, imparted music knowledge to thousands of aspirants, many of whom are amongst today's top musicians. His father, Naresh Sharma, was a leading expert of musical arrangements, having worked with almost all of the top composers in more than two hundred movies. Mithoon's father and his uncle Pyarelal Ramprasad Sharma formed one-half of the composer duo Laxmikant–Pyarelal.

Mithoon started learning music at the age of eleven. Since his father remained busy, he sent him to knowledgeable people to train himself. His father observed him closely and would often notice what he was practicing. On 6 November 2022, he married playback singer Palak Muchhal.

== Career ==
Mithoon began his career with two recreations: "Woh Lamhe" in Zeher and "Aadat" in Kalyug. In 2006, Mithoon's friend recommended his name to Onir, (director of Bas Ek Pal), who wanted an electro-based title track. This led to his first original song as a composer, "Bas Ek Pal" with singer KK, and was followed by "Tere Bin" (by singer Atif Aslam) in 2006. Both songs were included in the film Bas Ek Pal.

He wrote the score for Anwar, released in 2007 and his compositions Tose Naina Lage and Maula Mere are still extremely popular.

He also worked as a guest composer for songs on several nonmovie albums, such as "Kuch Is Tarah" from Atif Aslam's album Doorie, and Abhijeet Sawant's and "Ek Shaqs" from the Abhijeet Sawant album Junoon. He released his own album, Tu Hi Mere Rab Ki Tarah Hai in 2009 with T-Series. For this album, Mithoon traveled to the United Kingdom to rope in musicians. There, he worked with musicians of the Philharmonic Orchestra.

In 2011, he composed two songs "Aye Khuda", "Phir Mohabbat" for the film Murder 2 which also marked the debut of Arijit Singh.

He wrote "O saathi" for the movie Shab and "Tum Hi Ho" for Aashiqui 2, which received critical acclaim and commercial success. He has also been a solo or guest composer for movies such as Jism 2, Yaariyan, Ek Villain, Hate Story 2, Creature 3D, Samrat & Co, Alone, Hamari Adhuri Kahani, Bhaag Johnny, All Is Well, Loveshhuda, Sanam Re, Ki & Ka, Shivaay, Wajah Tum Ho, Half Girlfriend, Aksar 2, Hate Story 4, Baaghi 2, Kabir Singh, Mercury, Khuda Haafiz, Radhe Shyam, Gadar 2, Saiyaara, Border 2, and Ikka.

== Discography ==
Denotes films that have not yet been released

Year	Film	Songs	Lyricist	Notes
2005	Zeher	"Woh Lamhe Woh Baatein", "Lamhe (Remix)"	Sayeed Quadari	
2005	Kalyug	"Aadat", "Aadat (Remix)"	Goher Mumtaz, Sayeed Quadri	
2006	Bas Ek Pal	"Bas Ek Pal", "Tere Bin"	Sayeed Quadri, Mithoon	Also lyricist
2007	Anwar	"Maula Mere Maula", "Javeda Zindagi"	Sayeed Quadri, Hasan Kamal	
2007	The Train	All songs	Sayeed Qudari	Solo Composer
2007	Aggar	All songs	Sayeed Qudari	Solo Composer
2010	Lamhaa	All songs	Sayeed Qudari, Amitabh Verma	Solo Composer
2011	Murder 2	"Aye Khuda", "Phir Mohabbat", "Aye Khuda (Remix)"	Mithoon, Sayeed Quadri	Also lyricist
2012	Jism 2	"Yeh Kasoor"	Mithoon, Sayeed Quadri	Also lyricist
2013	3G	All songs	Mithoon, Shellee, Sonu Kakar	Solo Composer, lyricist
2013	Aashiqui 2	"Tum Hi Ho", "Meri Aashiqui", "Aashiqui – The Love Theme", "Aashiqui 2 Mashup"	Mithoon	Also lyricist Winner, Apsara Award for Best Lyrics for "Tum Hi Ho"; Nominated, Apsara Award for Best Music Director; Winner, IIFA Award for Best Music Director with Ankit Tiwari & Jeet Ganguly; Winner, IIFA Award for Best Lyricist for "Tum Hi Ho"; Winner, Filmfare Award for Best Music Director with Ankit Tiwari & Jeet Ganguly; Nominated, Filmfare Award for Best Lyricist for "Tum Hi Ho"; Nominated, Screen Award for Best Music Director; Winner, BIG Star Entertainment Award for Most Entertaining Song for "Tum Hi Ho"; Winner, Global Indian Music Award for Best Film Album with Ankit Tiwari & Jeet Ganguly; Winner, Global Indian Music Award for Best Film Song for "Tum Hi Ho"; Winner, Mirchi Music Award for Song of the Year for "Tum Hi Ho" with Arijit Singh; Winner, Mirchi Music Award for Album of the Year with Ankit Tiwari & Jeet Ganguly; Winner, Mirchi Music Award for Music Composer of the Year for "Tum Hi Ho"; Winner, Mirchi Music Award for Best Album with Ankit Tiwari & Jeet Ganguly; Nominated, Screen Weekly Award for Best Music with Ankit Tiwari & Jeet Ganguly; Winner, Zee Cine Award for Best Music Director with Ankit Tiwari & Jeet Ganguly; Winner, Zee Cine Award for Best Lyricist for "Tum Hi Ho"; Winner, Zee Cine Award for Best Song of the Year with Arijit Singh
2014	Yaariyan	"Baarish", "Mujhe Ishq Se"	Mithoon	Also lyricist
2014	Samrat & Co.	"Shukr Tera", "O Humnavaa"	Mithoon	Also lyricist
2014	Ek Villain	"Banjaara", "Zaroorat", "Humdard"	Mithoon	Also lyricist Winner: Bollywood Hungama Surfers' Choice Music Award for Best Soundtrack, shared with Ankit Tiwari, Soch
2014	Hate Story 2	"Hai Dil Yeh Mera", "Hai Dil Yeh Mera (Remix)"	Mithoon	Also lyricist
2014	Creature 3D	All songs except "Sawan Aaya Hai" and "Sawan Aaya Hai (Reprise)	Mithoon	Lead Composer, lyricist, singer
2015	Alone	"Awaara"	Mithoon	Also lyricist
2015	Hamari Adhuri Kahani	"Humnava"	Sayeed Quadari	
2015	All Is Well	"Mere Humsafar (Remake)"	Amitabh Verma	
2015	Bhaag Johnny	"Kinna Sona" & "Meri Zindagi"	Amitabh Verma	
2016	Love Shhuda	"Mar Jaayen" & "Mar Jaayen (Reprise)"	Sayeed Qudari	
2016	Sanam Re	"Tere Liye" and "Sanam Re (Title Track) "	Mithoon	Also lyricist
2016	Ki and Ka	"Ji Hazoori"	Sayeed Quadari	Also singer
2016	Traffic	All songs	A. M. Turaz, Mithoon, Sayeed Quadri	Solo Composer, lyricist
2016	Shivaay	"Bolo Har Har" (along with Badshah and The Vamps), "Darkhast", "Tere Naal Ishqa"	Sayeed Quadri, Sandeep Srivastava	Lead Composer, Co-composed one song along with Badshah, The Vamps
2016	Wajah Tum Ho	"Wajah Tum Ho"	Manoj Muntashir	
2017	Half Girlfriend	"Phir Bhi Tumko Chahunga", "Pal Bhar (Chahunga reprise)", "Chahunga (Shraddha Kapoor version)", "Chahunga (Jyotica Tangri version", "Half Girlfriend - Love Theme"	Manoj Muntashir	
2017	Shab	All Songs	Mithoon, Amitabh Verma	Solo Composer, lyricist
2017	Aksar 2	All Songs	Sayeed Quadri	Solo Composer
2018	Hate Story 4	"Tum Mere Ho"	Manoj Muntashir	
2018	Baaghi 2	"Lo Safar"	Sayeed Quadri	
2018	Mercury	"The Mercury Song"	Sayeed Quadri	Single song film
2019	Kabir Singh	"Tujhe Kitna Chahne Lage" "Tujhe Kitna Chahein Aur (Film Version)"	Mithoon	Also lyricist
2019	Satellite Shankar	Tere Sang	Mithoon	Also lyricist
2020	Malang	Chal Ghar chalen	Sayeed Quadri	
2020	Khuda Haafiz	All Songs	Mithoon, Sayeed Quadri	Solo Composer, lyricist Disney Plus Hotstar film
2022	Radhe Shyam	"Aashiqui Aa Gayi" "Soch Liya" "Udd Ja Parindey" "Shooting Stars" "Soch Liya (Composer's Draft)"	Mithoon, Manoj Muntashir	Also lyricist
2022	Jugjugg Jeeyo	"Ik Mulaqaat" (scrapped from the album)	Mithoon	Also lyricist
2022	Khuda Haafiz 2	"Chaiyaan Mein Saiyaan Ki"	Mithoon, Faruk Kabir	Also lyricist
2022	HIT: The First Case	"Kitni Haseen Hogi"	Sayeed Quadari	
2022	Shamshera	All songs	Mithoon, Piyush Mishra, Karan Malhotra	Solo Composer, Singer, Lyricist, First collaboration with YRF
2022	Salaam Venky	All songs	Mithoon, Kausar Munir, Sandeep Shrivastva	Solo Composer, Lyricist
2023	Gumraah	"Allah De Bande"	Mithoon	Also lyricist
2023	Bawaal	"Tumhe Kitna Pyaar Karte"	Manoj Muntashir	Amazon Prime Video film
2023	Gadar 2	"Udd Jaa Kaale Kaava", "Khairiyat", "Main Nikla Gaddi Leke", "Dil Jhoom", "Sura Soi", "Chal Tere Ishq Mein", "Udd Jaa Kaale Kaava" (Climax Version), "Udd Jaa Kaale Kaava" (Palak Mucchal), "Chal Tere Ishq Mein" (Vishal Mishra), "Khairiyat" (Sakshi Holkar), "Dil Jhoom" (Vishal Mishra)	Sayeed Quadri, Anand Bakshi, Guru Granth	Composed soundtrack with Monty Sharma
2024	Crakk	"Khayal Rakhna"	Manoj Muntashir	Also singer
2024	Vanvaas	All songs	Sayeed Quadri	
2025	Saiyaara	"Dhun", "Krish Kapoor"	Mithoon	"Krish Kapoor" co-composed with John Stewart Eduri
2026	Border 2	"Ghar Kab Aaoge", "Jaate Hue Lamhon", "Tara Rum Pum Pum", "Hindustan Meri Jaan", "Mitti Ke Bete", "Mohabbat Ho Gayi Hai"	Javed Akhtar, Manoj Muntashir, Kumaar	Along with Anu Malik
2026	Ikka	All songs	Sayeed Qadri, Raja Kumari	Netflix film
2026	Awarapan 2	"Ve Junoon", "Tera Mera Rishta Continues", "Tera Mera Rishta Continues (Film Version)", "Toh Phir Aao (Dobara)"	Sayeed Quadri	Along with Pritam

== Albums ==
Sr No	Album	Song	Year
1	Tu Hi Mere Rab Ki Tarah Hai	"Tu Hi Mere Rab Ki Tarah Hai", "Kuch Dard Mujhe Tu", "Aashiqui Aashiqui", "Tu Hai", "Ab Toh Har", "Mujhe Ishq De"	2009
2	Junoon	"Ek Shaqs"	2007
3	Doorie	"Kuch Is Tarah"	2006

== Singles ==
Sr No	Year	Song	Artists	Ref.
1	2019	"One India My India"	Sukhwinder Singh, Jubin Nautiyal, Godswill & Mithoon	
2	2019	"Intezaar"	Arijit Singh & Asees Kaur	
3	2020	"Toh Aa Gaye Hum"	Jubin Nautiyal	
4	2023	"Wahi Toh Khuda Hai"	Armaan Malik	
5	2025	"Tu Saath Hai Toh"	Vishal Mishra	

== Awards and nominations ==
=== Asiavision Awards ===
Year	Film	Category	Result	Ref.
2017	Shab	Best Music Director	Won	

=== BIG Star Entertainment Awards ===
Year	Film	Category	Result	Ref.
2014	Aashiqui 2	Most Entertaining Song ("Sunn Raha Hai")	Nominated	
2014	Aashiqui 2	Most Entertaining Music	Nominated	
2015	Ek Villain	Most Entertaining Music	Nominated	

=== Filmfare Awards ===
Year	Film	Category	Result	Ref.
2014	Aashiqui 2	Best Lyricist (for "Tum Hi Ho")	Nominated	
2014	Aashiqui 2	Best Music Director	Won	
2015	Yaariyan	Best Music Director	Nominated	
2015	Ek Villain	Best Music Director	Nominated	
2018	Half Girlfriend	Best Music Director	Nominated	
2020	Kabir Singh	Best Music Director	Won	
2020	Kabir Singh	Best Lyricist (for "Tujhe Kitna Chahne Lage Hum")	Nominated	

=== Global Indian Music Academy Awards ===
Year	Film	Category	Result	Ref.
2014	Aashiqui 2	Best Film Album	Nominated	
2014	Aashiqui 2	Best Music Director	Nominated	
2015	Ek Villain	Best Music Director	Nominated	

=== International Indian Film Academy Awards ===
Year	Film	Category	Result	Ref.
2014	Aashiqui 2	Best Lyricist (for "Tum Hi Ho")	Won	
2014	Aashiqui 2	Best Music Director	Won	
2015	Ek Villain	Best Music Director	Nominated	
2015	Yaariyan	Best Music Director	Nominated	
2020	Kabir Singh	Best Music Director	Won	

=== Mirchi Music Awards ===
Year	Film	Category	Result	Ref.
2014	Aashiqui 2	Album of The Year	Won	
2014	Aashiqui 2	Song of The Year (for "Tum Hi Ho")	Won	
2014	Aashiqui 2	Music Composer of The Year	Won	
2015	Ek Villain	Album of The Year	Nominated	
2015	Ek Villain	Listeners' Choice Album of the Year	Won	
2018	Half Girlfriend	Music Composer of The Year	Nominated	
2018	Half Girlfriend	Song of The Year (for "Phir Bhi Tumko Chaahunga")	Won	
2020	Kabir Singh	Music Composer of The Year (for "Tujhe Kitna Chahne Lage")	Nominated	
2020	Kabir Singh	Song of The Year (for "Tujhe Kitna Chahne Lage")	Nominated	
2020	Kabir Singh	Album of The Year	Nominated	

=== Producers Guild Film Awards ===
Year	Film	Category	Result	Ref.
2014	Aashiqui 2	Best Music Director	Nominated	
2014	Aashiqui 2	Best Lyricist (for "Tum Hi Ho")	Won	

=== Screen Awards ===
Year	Film	Category	Result	Ref.
2014	Aashiqui 2	Best Music Director	Nominated	
2015	Ek Villain	Best Lyricist (for "Banjaara")	Won	
2015	Ek Villain	Best Music Director	Nominated	
2015	Yaariyan	Best Music Director	Nominated	
2017	Half Girlfriend	Best Music Director	Nominated	
2017	Half Girlfriend	Best Background Music	Nominated	
2019	Kabir Singh	Best Music Director	Won	

=== Stardust Awards ===
Year	Film	Category	Result	Ref.
2007	Bas Ek Pal	Standout Performance by a Music Director	Won	
2015	Ek Villain	Best Lyricist (for "Banjaara")	Nominated	
2015	Ek Villain	Best Music Director	Nominated	
2015	Yaariyan	Best Music Director	Won	
2017	Sanam Re	Best Music Director	Nominated	
2017	Sanam Re	Best Lyricist (for "Sanam Re")	Nominated	

=== Zee Cine Awards ===
Year	Film	Category	Result	Ref.
2014	Aashiqui 2	Best Track of the Year (for "Tum Hi Ho")	Won	
2014	Aashiqui 2	Best Lyricist (for "Tum Hi Ho")	Won	
2014	Aashiqui 2	Best Music Director	Won	
2017	Half Girlfriend	Best Music Director	Nominated	

- Gaana User's Choice Awards – Best Music Composer (for "Phir Bhi Tumko Chaahunga") – Won
- Bollywood Journalist Awards – Best Music Director (for "Phir Bhi Tumko Chaahunga") – Nominated
