= Secret Superstar (soundtrack) =

Soundtrack album by Amit Trivedi
- Released: 21 September 2017
- Recorded: 2016–2017
- Studios: A T Studios, Mumbai; YRF Studios, Mumbai; AM Studios, Chennai
- Genre: Feature film soundtrack
- Length: 33:55
- Language: Hindi
- Label: Zee Music Company
- Producer: Amit Trivedi

Amit Trivedi chronology
Qaidi Band (2017)	Secret Superstar (2017)	Pad Man (2017)
External audio
- Audio Jukebox on YouTube

Singles from Secret Superstar
- 1. "Main Kaun Hoon" Released: 23 August 2017

Secret Superstar is the soundtrack album to the 2017 film of the same name directed by Advait Chandan and produced by Aamir Khan under his Aamir Khan Productions and Zee Studios, starring Zaira Wasim and Khan. The soundtrack featured eight songs composed by Amit Trivedi and lyrics written by Kausar Munir and featured vocals by Meghna Mishra, Mika Singh, Sunidhi Chauhan and Kushal Chokshi. Preceded by one single "Main Kaun Hoon", the soundtrack was released under the Zee Music Company label on 21 September 2017. Meghna Mishra was praised for her vocals and won numerous accolades for her playback singing stint at Filmfare, IIFA and Mirchi Music Awards amongst other ceremonies.

== Development ==
A. R. Rahman was initially considered as the composer for the film after previously collaborating with Lagaan (2001), Mangal Pandey: The Rising (2005), Rang De Basanti (2006) and Ghajini (2008); he was involved in the project during July 2015. Prasoon Joshi was also confirmed to write the lyrics. But once the production was delayed, Rahman and Prasoon Joshi opted out of the project citing scheduling conflicts. Later, Amit Trivedi and Kausar Munir were brought in as the composer and lyricist respectively. Calling it as a "dream come true" moment on working with Khan, Trivedi enjoyed the composition process and found Khan as a delight to work with, being mentored and guided throughout the music curation, especially while recording the songs and background score under Khan's supervision, where the latter provides suggestions for the music. Khan complimented Trivedi's work as the film revolved around a 15-year-old singer-songwriter and music was considered a pivotal part in the film.

Meghna Mishra was chosen as the singing voice for Insia Malik (Wasim) performing five songs for the album. She received the offer for the film in March 2016, when Mishra had completed her 9th standard exams, from Trivedi's studio manager Ashish Narula through a telephonic conversation and presented her a contract, which she never signed before. She then met Trivedi, Munir and Chandan at Khan's farmhouse in Panchgani, where he had composed all the songs outside the house and discussed with her about the tune. She rehearsed for her vocals throughout the day, and record it in the evening at a mini studio setup by Trivedi in one of the rooms. Post the recording and mixing, he would call all of the team members to ensure that he would listen to the songs and share their opinions, except for Khan who joined 3–4 days later. Upon working with Khan, Mishra said that "It doesn't feel like you are working with Aamir sir; you feel so comfortable [...] He used to make suggestions, taught me good things. I learnt a lot from him like dedication, passion for work."

The remaining songs were performed by Sunidhi Chauhan, Mika Singh and Kushal Chokshi.

== Release ==
The first song "Main Kaun Hoon" was released on 23 August 2017 at a launch event in Mumbai. It was released as a digital single and a music video that released two days later. The second song "Meri Pyaari Ammi" was released in a music video format on 7 September 2017. The music video for the third song "Sapne Re" was released on 17 September. The soundtrack album was released on 21 September 2017.

== Reception ==
Joginder Tuteja of Bollywood Hungama wrote "Secret Superstar boasts of a decent to good soundtrack and though this one isn't really a major musical that one would have expected out of it, as an overall package it should make an impression in the film." Manish Gaekwad of Film Companion wrote "Trivedi's tunes and Munir's lyrics do a splendid job of illustrating Insiya's world; her hopes and dreams, and faithfully remain secondary because her struggle isn't just about the music." Karthik Srinivasan of Milliblog described it as a "charming—and conventional—soundtrack." Vipin Nair of The Hindu wrote "Secret Superstar’s music scores high owing to Kausir Munir’s words and singer Meghna Mishra".

Meena Iyer of The Times of India wrote "Amit Trivedi’s music is pleasing but the score doesn’t have the winning quality needed for a film like this. The lyrics by Kausar Munir just about pass muster." Devesh Sharma of Filmfare described the background score as "soul stirring" while further added "Secret Superstar's most magical moment also comes thanks to Trivedi's song Nachdi phiran. This song and the way it plays out in the film’s screenplay is pure magic." Udita Jhunjhunwala of Scroll.in wrote "Amit Trivedi’s music and Kausar Munir’s lyrics are not very catchy and are cheesy even. But put them in the context of a 15-year-old’s imagination and the simplistic rhyme makes sense. What remains unconvincing however, is Insiya’s rapid rise. With Meghna Mishra doing the vocals for Insiya, she sounds competent but still a long way from being a superstar who would get instant online fame." Mayur Sanap of Deccan Chronicle wrote "Amit Trivedi's winsome music is another striking aspect of the film. Songs like ‘Main Kaun Hoon’, ‘Pyaari Ammi’, ‘Nachdi Phira’ are very charming and will stay with you after the film."

== Chinese versions ==
For the film's China release, a Mandarin Chinese version of the song "Main Kaun Hoon" was sung by actor-singer Huang Bo. He was previously Aamir Khan's voice actor for the Mandarin dub of 3 Idiots.

For the film's Hong Kong release, a Cantonese version of "Nachdi Phira" has been sung by Cantopop star Kay Tse. The Cantonese version of the song is entitled "Ko Sing Yue Cho" and was released digitally on 11 April 2018.

== Track listing ==
All lyrics are written by Kausar Munir; all music is composed by Amit Trivedi.

No.	Title	Singer(s)	Length
1.	"Main Kaun Hoon"	Meghna Mishra	03:45
2.	"Meri Pyaari Ammi"	Meghna Mishra	05:28
3.	"Sapne Re"	Meghna Mishra	04:10
4.	"I'll Miss You"	Kushal Chokshi	05:12
5.	"Nachdi Phira"	Meghna Mishra	04:15
6.	"Sexy Baliye"	Mika Singh	03:13
7.	"Gudgudi"	Sunidhi Chauhan	04:12
8.	"O Re Manwa"	Meghna Mishra	03:40
Total length:			33:55

== Personnel ==
- Music composed, produced and arranged by – Amit Trivedi
- Programming – Amit Trivedi, Gourab Dutta, Vineeth Jayan, Raja Rasaily, Jarvis Menezes
- Piano – Jarvis Menezes
- Drums – Darshan Doshi, Jai Row Kavi
- Guitar – Nyzel Dlima, Warren Mendonsa, Pozy Dharr
- Bass guitar – Ardeshir Mistry
- Banjo, mandolin – Tapas Roy
- Saxophone, clarinet, flute – Inapakurti D Rao
- Percussion – Sanket Naik
- Violin – Jitendra H. Thakur
- Strings – Chennai Strings Orchestra (conducted by Kalyan)
- Recorded at – A T Studios and YRF Studios, Mumbai and AM Studios, Chennai
- Recording engineers – Abhishek Sortey, Shantanu Hudilkar, S. Sivakumar, Pradeep Menon, Manoj Raman, Srinath Krishna
- Recording assistance – Urmila Sutar, Firoz Shaikh, Abhishek Khandelwal, Manasi Tare
- Mixed by – Shadab Rayeen at New Edge Studios, Mumbai
- Mixing assistance – Abhishek Sortey, Dhananjay Khapekar
- Mastered by – Donal Whelan at Masteringworld, London
- Executive producer – Krutee Trivedi
- Head of production – Aashish Narula

== Awards and nominations ==
Date of ceremony	Award	Category	Recipient(s) and nominee(s)	Result	Ref
30 December 2017	Zee Cine Awards	Best Music Director	Amit Trivedi	Won	
30 December 2017	Zee Cine Awards	Best Playback Singer – Female	Meghna Mishra (for the song "Main Kaun Hoon")	Nominated	
30 December 2017	Zee Cine Awards	Best Lyricist	Kausar Munir (for the song "Main Kaun Hoon")	Nominated	
20 January 2018	Filmfare Awards	Best Playback Singer – Female	Meghna Mishra (for the song "Nachdi Phira")	Won	
20 January 2018	Filmfare Awards	Best Music Album	Amit Trivedi	Nominated	
20 January 2018	Filmfare Awards	Best Lyrics	Kausar Munir (for the song "Nachdi Phira")	Nominated	
28 January 2018	Mirchi Music Awards	Upcoming Female Vocalist of The Year	Meghna Mishra (for the song "Main Kaun Hoon")	Won	
28 January 2018	Mirchi Music Awards	Upcoming Female Vocalist of The Year	Meghna Mishra (for the song "Meri Pyaari Ammi")	Nominated	
28 January 2018	Mirchi Music Awards	Upcoming Female Vocalist of The Year	Meghna Mishra (for the song "Nachdi Phira")	Nominated	
28 January 2018	Mirchi Music Awards	Album of The Year	Amit Trivedi, Kausar Munir	Nominated	
6 March 2018	Bollywood Film Journalists Awards	Best Music Director	Amit Trivedi	Won	
6 March 2018	Bollywood Film Journalists Awards	Best Playback Singer – Female	Meghna Mishra (for the song "Nachdi Phira")	Won	
6 March 2018	Bollywood Film Journalists Awards	Best Playback Singer – Female	Meghna Mishra (for the song "Main Kaun Hoon")	Won	
6 March 2018	Bollywood Film Journalists Awards	Best Lyrics	Kausar Munir (for the song "Main Kaun Hoon")	Won	
20 March 2018	News18 Reel Movie Awards	Best Playback Singer – Female	Meghna Mishra (for the song "Nachdi Phira")	Won	
22 June 2018	International Indian Film Academy Awards	Best Playback Singer – Female	Meghna Mishra (for the song "Main Kaun Hoon")	Won	
