= 19th IIFA Awards =

Indian film award ceremony in 2018

- Date: 22 June 2018– 24 June 2018
- Site: Siam Niramit Bangkok; Bangkok, Thailand
- Hosted by: Karan Johar and Riteish Deshmukh

Highlights
- Best Film: Tumhari Sulu
- Website: http://www.iifa.com

Television/radio coverage
- Network: Colors TV
- Produced by: Wizcraft International

This was the 19th edition of the International Indian Film Academy Awards. This edition was held in Thailand on 22-24 June 2018. This was – the second time this event was held in Thailand after 2008. The show was hosted by Karan Johar and Ritesh Deshmukh. The awards were given – the Bollywood films in 2017.

Tumhari Sulu led the ceremony with 7 nominations, followed by Newton with 5 nominations and Bareilly Ki Barfi and Hindi Medium with 4 nominations each.

Jagga Jasoos won 3 awards, thus becoming the most-awarded film at the ceremony.

Rajkummar Rao received dual nominations at the ceremony, having been nominated for Best Actor for Newton and Best Supporting Actor for Bareilly Ki Barfi, but lost both to Irrfan Khan for Hindi Medium and Nawazuddin Siddiqui for Mom, respectively.

Seema Pahwa received dual nominations for Best Supporting Actress for her performances in Bareilly Ki Barfi and Shubh Mangal Saavdhan, but lost to Meher Vij, who won the award for Secret Superstar.

== Winners and Nominees ==
=== Film Awards ===
Best Film	Best Director
Tumhari Sulu; Bareilly Ki Barfi; Hindi Medium; Newton; Toilet: Ek Prem Katha	Saket Chaudhary – Hindi Medium; Amit V, Masurkar – Newton; Anurag Basu – Jagga Jasoos; Ashwiny Iyer Tiwari – Bareilly Ki Barfi; Suresh Triveni – Tumhari Sulu
Best Actor In A Leading Role	Best Actress In A Leading Role
Irrfan Khan – Hindi Medium; Adil Hussain – Mukti Bhawan; Akshay Kumar – Toilet: Ek Prem Katha; Rajkummar Rao – Newton; Ranbir Kapoor – Jagga Jasoos	Sridevi – Mom; Alia Bhatt – Badrinath Ki Dulhania; Bhumi Pednekar – Shubh Mangal Saavdhan; Vidya Balan – Tumhari Sulu; Zaira Wasim – Secret Superstar
Best Actor In A Supporting Role	Best Actress In A Supporting Role
Nawazuddin Siddiqui – Mom; Deepak Dobriyal – Hindi Medium; Pankaj Tripathi – Newton; Rajkummar Rao – Bareilly Ki Barfi; Vijay Maurya – Tumhari Sulu	Meher Vij – Secret Superstar; Neha Dhupia – Tumhari Sulu; Seema Pahwa – Bareilly Ki Barfi; Seema Pahwa – Shubh Mangal Saavdhan; Tabu – Golmaal Again
Best Story	Best Screenplay
Amit V. Masurkar – Newton; Siddharth–Garima – Toilet: Ek Prem Katha; Suresh Triveni – Tumhari Sulu	Nitesh Tiwari and Shreyas Jain – Bareilly Ki Barfi
Best Debut Director
Konkona Sen Sharma – A Death in the Gunj

=== Music Awards ===
Best Music Director	Best Background Score
Amaal Mallik, Tanishk Bagchi, Akhil Sachdeva – Badrinath Ki Dulhania; Pritam – Jagga Jasoos; Tanishk Bagchi, Guru Randhawa, Rajat Nagpal, Amartya Rahut, Santanu Ghatak – Tumhari Sulu	Pritam – Jagga Jasoos
Best Playback Singer (Male)	Best Playback Singer (Female)
Arijit Singh – "Hawayein" – Jab Harry Met Sejal	Meghna Mishra – "Main Kaun Hoon" – Secret Superstar
Best Lyrics	Best Sound Design
Manoj Muntashir – "Mere Rashke Qamar" – Baadshaho	Dileep Subramaniam and Ganesh Gangadharan (YRF Studios) – Tiger Zinda Hai

=== Technical Awards ===
Best Action	Best Special Effects
	NY VFXwala (Prasad Vasant Sutar) – Jagga Jasoos
Best Cinematography	Best Choreography
Marcin Laskawiec, USC – Tiger Zinda Hai	Vijay Ganguly and Ruel Dausan Varindani – "Galti Se Mistake" – Jagga Jasoos
Best Costume Design	Best Dialogue
	Hitesh Kewalya – Shubh Mangal Saavdhan
Best Editing	Best Makeup
Shweta Venkat Mathew – Newton	
Best Production Design	Best Art Direction
Best Sound Mixing	Best Sound Recording

=== Special awards ===
Outstanding Achievement	Style Icon
Anupam Kher	Kriti Sanon

== Superlatives ==
Films with multiple nominations
Nominations	Film
7	Tumhari Sulu
5	Newton
4	Bareilly Ki Barfi
4	Hindi Medium
3	Jagga Jasoos
3	Toilet: Ek Prem Katha
2	Badrinath Ki Dulhania
2	Mom
2	Secret Superstar
2	Shubh Mangal Saavdhan

FIlms with multiple awards
Awards	Film
3	Jagga Jasoos
2	Hindi Medium
2	Mom
2	Newton
2	Secret Superstar
2	Tiger Zinda Hai
