= Rajeev Surti =

Indian choreographer & actor

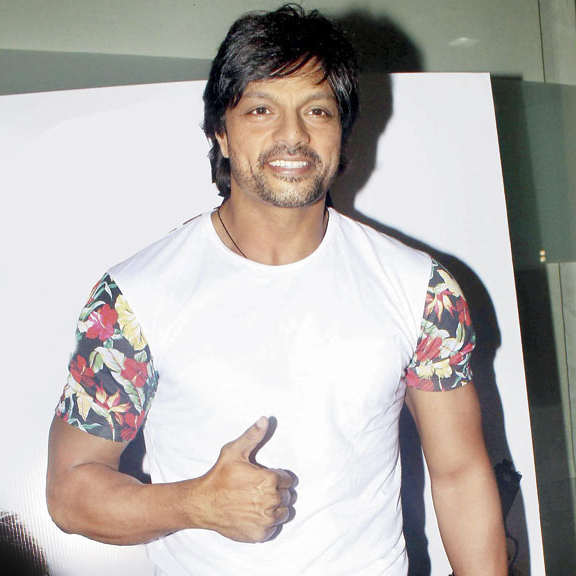
- Rajeev Surti on Music launch of film Yeh Toh Two Much Ho Gayaa
- Born: June , 16 (present-day Mumbai, India)
- Occupations: Actor; Director; Dance Choreographer; Rapper; Producer
- Years active: 1995–present
- Spouse: Surti Sejal (m. 1995)
- Children: 1
- Parents: Surti Khandubhai (father); Surti Taramati (mother)

Rajeev Surti (born 16 June) is an Indian actor, dancer, dance choreographer, director, rapper, and producer known for his extensive work in the Hindi film industry, Hollywood, and South Indian cinema. In a career spanning 20 years, he has performed and designed a wide range of dancing styles. In addition, Rajeev founded Rajeev Surti Production PVT Ltd. and the Rajeev Surti Dance Factory, which has locations in India and beyond.

== Acting career ==
Rajeev Surti has showcased his acting talent in various mediums, including theater, films, and music videos. His theater credits include performances in plays such as Jai Shree Ram, Woh, Nuclear Sher, Social Media, and Made for Others. In FILMS he portrayed the role of Shree Ram in GODHRA. He also appeared in the award-winning short film Acceptance, for which he received the "Best Actor" award at the Five Continents International Film Festival (FICOCC) in Venezuela. In addition to his acting career, he appeared as the lead and rapper in the music video Dance Scene.

== Choreography career ==
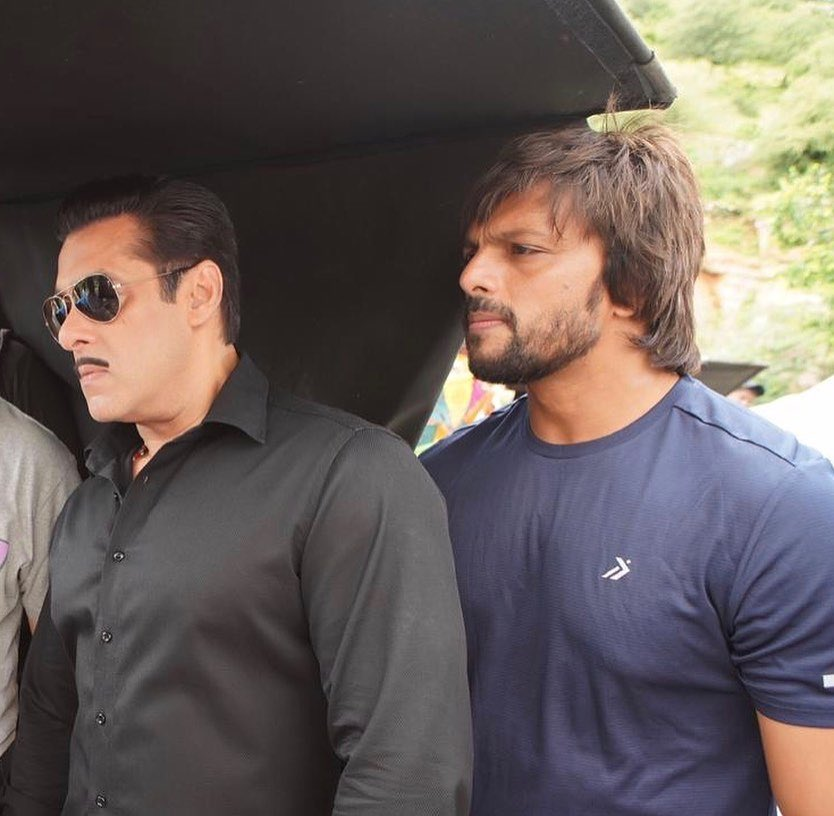
Rajeev with superstar Salman Khan in 2010 on the Set of Dabangg

Rajeev Surti is a celebrated choreographer in the Indian films he choreographed films like Don (2006), Raees (2017) with Shahrukh khan, Wanted (2009, London Dreams, Dabangg, Me and Mrs. Khanna, O Teri, Hello with Salman Khan, The musical drama Secret Superstar (2017) with Aamir khan, Baabul & Sarkar Raj with Shri Amitabh Bachchan, Drona, Don & What's Your Raashee? with Priyanka Chopra.

More films like, Golmaal 3, Jaane Tu... Ya Jaane Na, the comedy-drama Tumhari Sulu (2017),the romantic drama Laila Majnu (2018), Banjo, Fukrey, ZINDA, Ek Main Aur Ekk Tu, Freaky Ali, Crook, Jannat, Murder 3, Saheb, Biwi Aur Gangster 3, Luck by Chance are among the notable choreography credits. Also Two dance pieces, "Phoonk Phoonk Ke" and "Rubaru," were created by dancer-choreographer Rajeev Surti for Yami Gautam and Vikrant Massey's film Ginny Weds Sunny.

=== Hollywood ===
Surti's choreography extends to Hollywood, where he worked on a film featuring Oscar-winning actress Brie Larson and Academy Honorary Award recipient Donald Sutherland. He has been featured in performances by international artists like Michael Jackson, Shaggy, and Diana King in concerts held in Mumbai & Pune.

=== Television ===
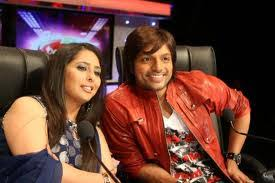
Rajeev with co-judge Geeta Kapur in 2011 on the Set of DID Doubles

Rajiv acted the judge of DID Doubles along with choreographers Marzi Pestonji and Geeta Kapur.

== Choreography ==
Year	Film(s)	Notes
2001	Lagaan	Assistant Choreographer
2006	Don	
2006	Baabul	
2006	Zinda	
2008	Hello	
2008	Sarkar Raj	
2008	Drona	
2008	Jaane Tu... Ya Jaane Na	
2008	Jannat	
2009	Luck by Chance	
2009	Main Aurr Mrs Khanna	
2009	What's Your Raashee?	
2009	Wanted	
2009	London Dreams	
2010	Crook	
2010	Dabangg	
2010	Golmaal 3	
2012	Ek Main Aur Ekk Tu	
2013	Fukrey	
2013	Murder 3	
2014	O Teri	
2016	Freaky Ali	
2016	Banjo	
2017	Raees	
2017	Tumhari Sulu	
2017	Secret Superstar	
2018	Saheb, Biwi Aur Gangster 3	
2020	Ginny Weds Sunny	
