= 63rd Filmfare Awards =

2018 awards for Hindi cinema

- 63rd Filmfare Awards
- Date: 20 January 2018
- Site: NSCI Dome, Mumbai
- Hosted by: Shah Rukh Khan; Karan Johar; Ayushmann Khurrana; Parineeti Chopra
- Official website: Filmfare Awards 2018

Highlights
- Best Film: Hindi Medium
- Critics Award for Best Film: Newton
- Most awards: Jagga Jasoos (4)
- Most nominations: Jagga Jasoos & Secret Superstar (10)

Television coverage
- Network: Colors TV

The 63rd Filmfare Awards ceremony, presented by the Filmfare Magazine, honored the best Hindi language Indian films released in 2017. The ceremony was held on 20 January 2018 and hosted by Shah Rukh Khan, Karan Johar, Ayushmann Khurrana and Parineeti Chopra.

Jagga Jasoos and Secret Superstar led the ceremony with 10 nominations each, followed by Tumhari Sulu with 9 nominations.

Jagga Jasoos won 4 awards, including Best Music Director (for Pritam) and Best Lyricist (for Amitabh Bhattacharya for "Ullu Ka Pattha"), thus becoming the most-awarded film at the ceremony.

Seema Pahwa received dual nominations for Best Supporting Actress for her performances in Bareilly Ki Barfi and Shubh Mangal Saavdhan, but lost to Meher Vij who won the award for Secret Superstar.

== Winners and nominees ==
=== Main awards ===
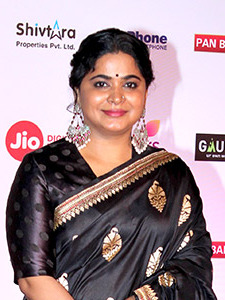
Ashwiny Iyer Tiwari, Best Director

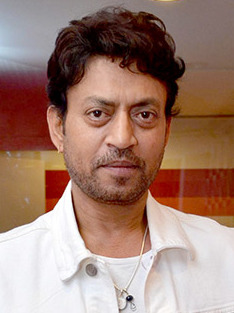
Irrfan Khan, Best Actor

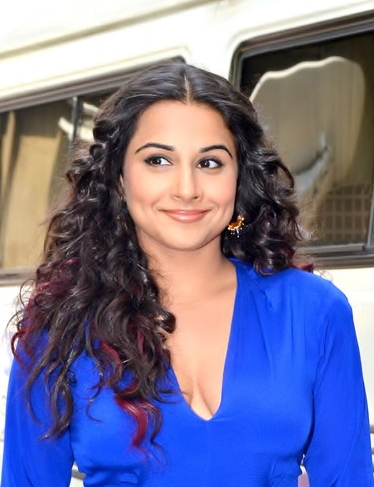
Vidya Balan, Best Actress

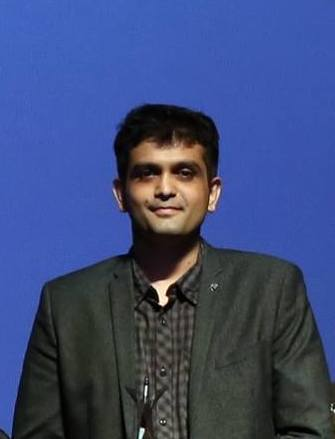
Amit V. Masurkar, Best Director Critics

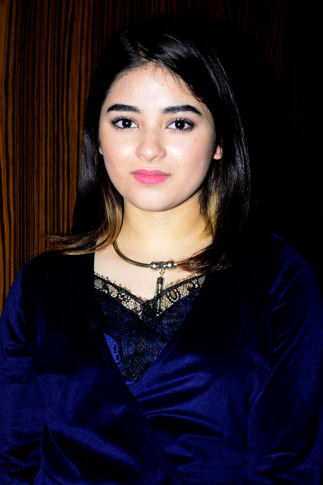
Zaira Wasim, Best Actress Critics

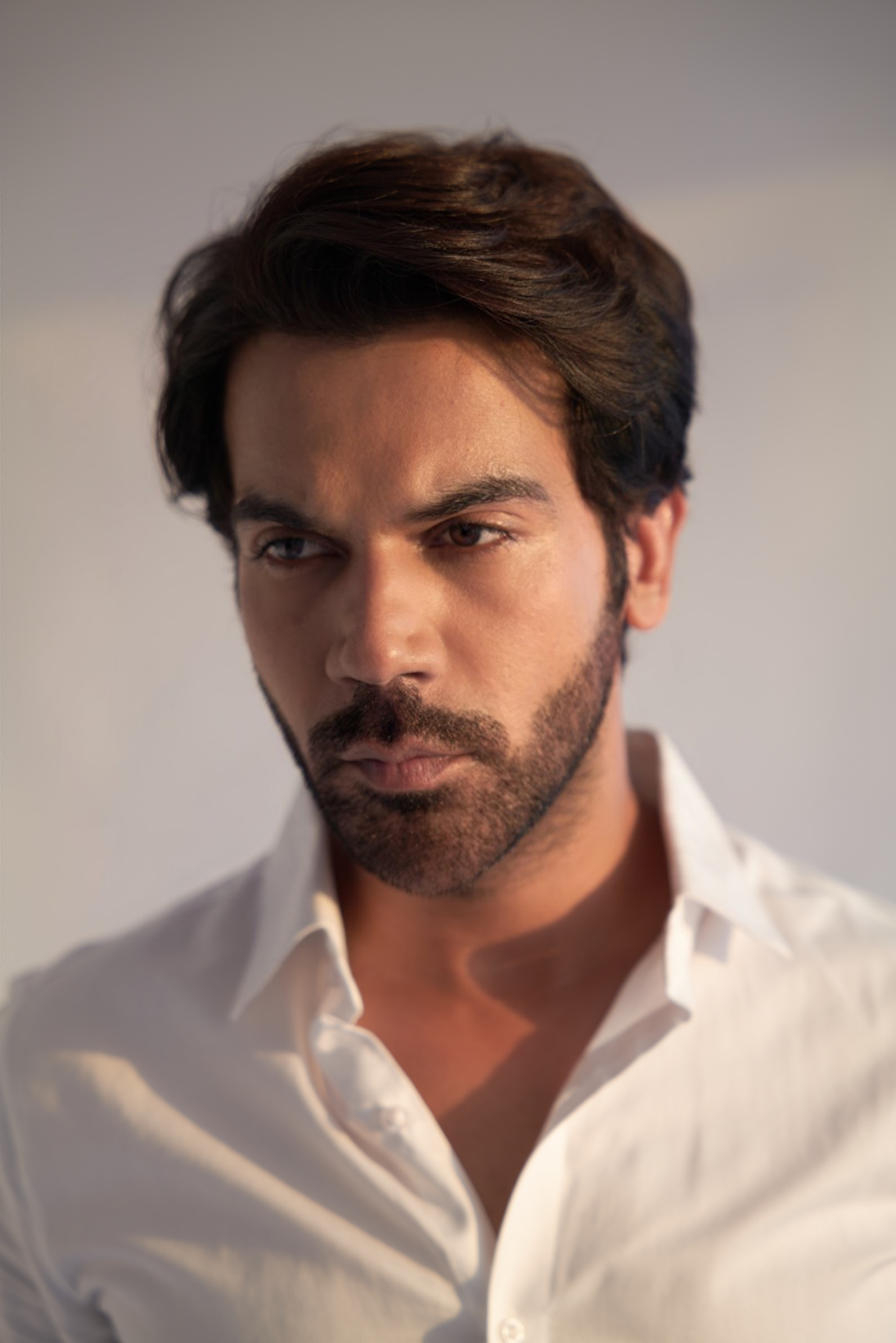
Rajkummar Rao, Best Actor Critics & Best Supporting Actor

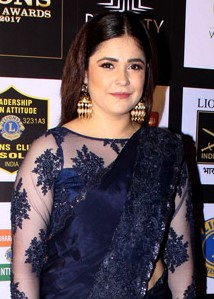
Meher Vij, Best Supporting Actress

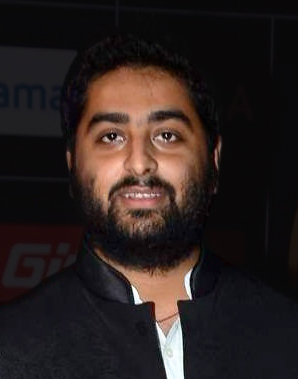
Arijit Singh, Best Male Playback Singer

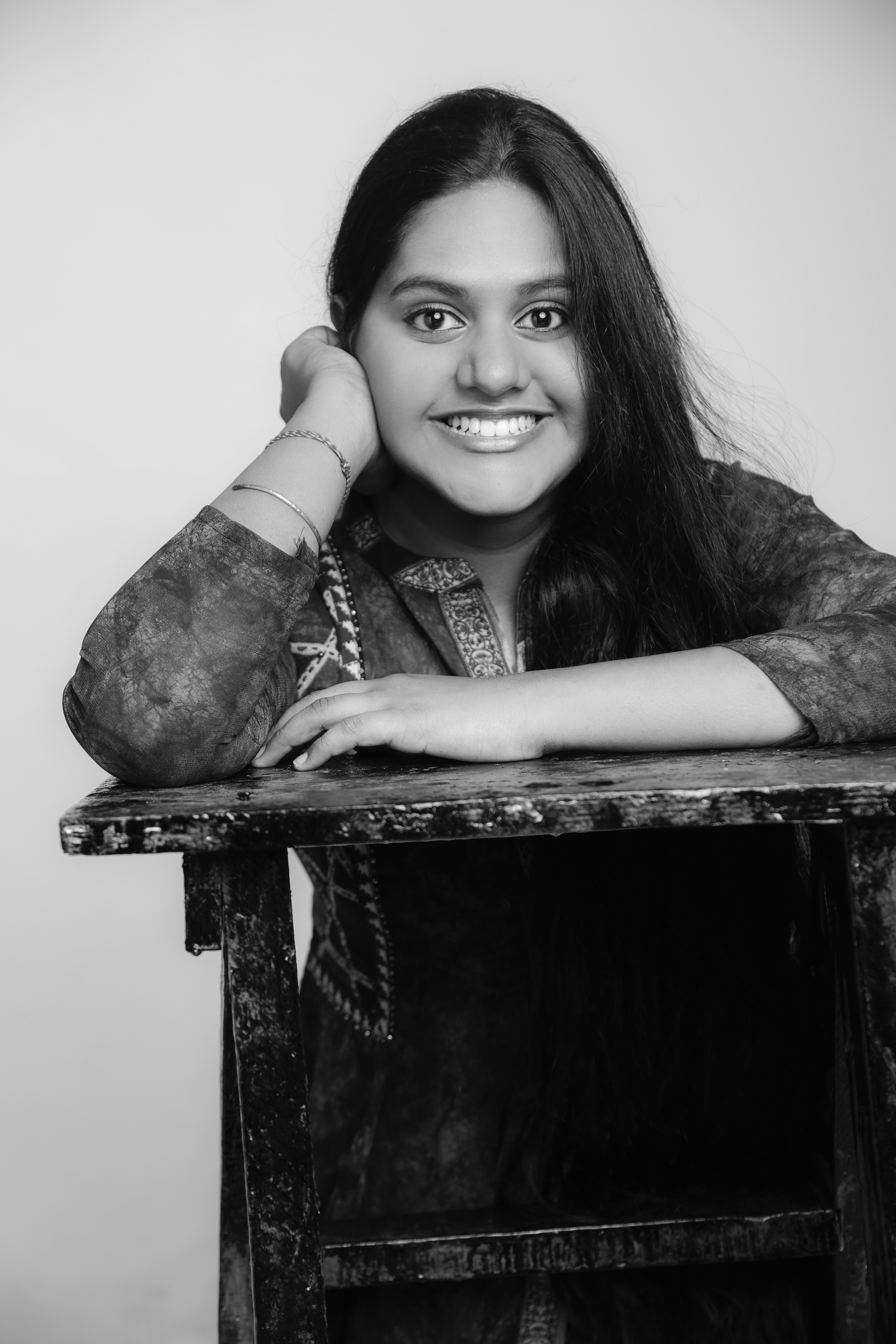
Meghna Mishra, Best Female Playback Singer

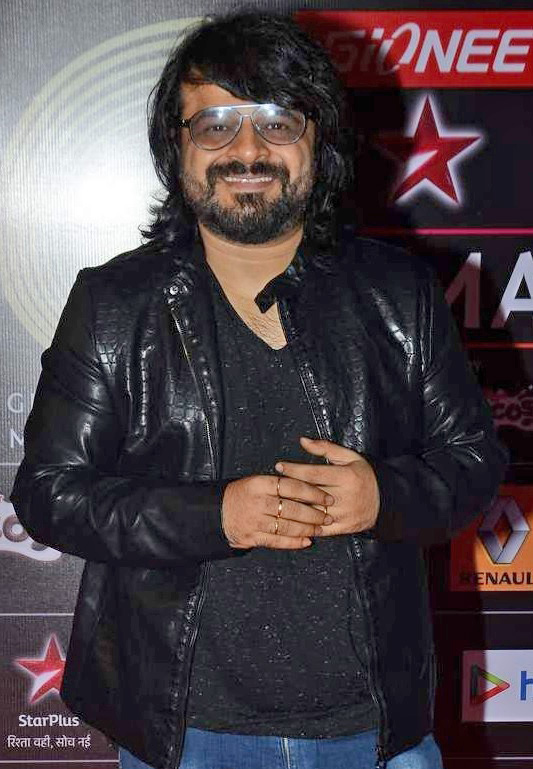
Pritam, Best Music Director

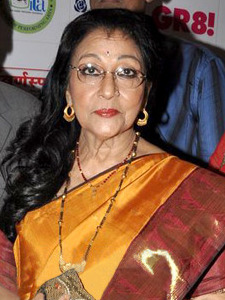
Mala Sinha, Lifetime Achievement Awardee

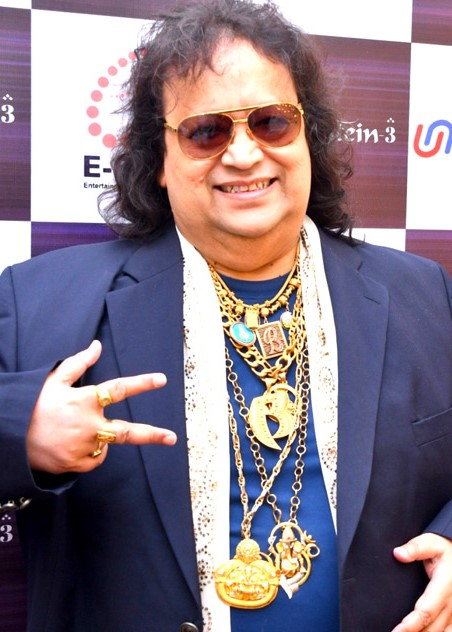
Bappi Lahiri, Lifetime Achievement Awardee

Nominees were announced on 18 January 2018. The winners were announced on 20 January 2018.

| Best Film | Best Director |
|---|---|
| Hindi Medium – T-Series and Maddock Films; Badrinath Ki Dulhania – Dharma Productions, Fox Star Studios; Bareilly Ki Barfi – BR Studios and Junglee Pictures; Secret Superstar – Zee Studios International, Aamir Khan Production; Toilet: Ek Prem Katha – Viacom 18 Motion Pictures, KriArj Entertainment, Cape of Good Films, and Friday Filmworks | Ashwiny Iyer Tiwari – Bareilly Ki Barfi; Advait Chandan – Secret Superstar; Saket Chaudhary – Hindi Medium; Shashank Khaitan – Badrinath Ki Dulhania; Shree Narayan Singh – Toilet: Ek Prem Katha |
| Best Actor | Best Actress |
| Irfan Khan – Hindi Medium as Raj Batra; Akshay Kumar – Toilet: Ek Prem Katha as Keshav Sharma; Ayushmann Khurrana – Shubh Mangal Saavdhan as Mudit Sharma; Hrithik Roshan – Kaabil as Rohan Bhatnagar; Shah Rukh Khan – Raees as Raees Alam; Varun Dhawan – Badrinath Ki Dulhania as Badrinath Bansal | Vidya Balan – Tumhari Sulu as Sulochana "Sulu" Dubey; Alia Bhatt – Badrinath Ki Dulhania as Vaidehi Trivedi; Bhumi Pednekar – Shubh Mangal Saavdhan as Sugandha; Saba Qamar – Hindi Medium as Meeta Batra; Sridevi – Mom as Devki Sabarwal; Zaira Wasim – Secret Superstar as Insia Malik |
| Best Supporting Actor | Best Supporting Actress |
| Rajkummar Rao – Bareilly Ki Barfi as Pritam Vidrohi; Aamir Khan – Secret Superstar as Shakti Kumar; Deepak Dobriyal – Hindi Medium as Shyamprakash Kori; Manav Kaul – Tumhari Sulu as Ashok Dubey; Nawazuddin Siddiqui – Mom as Daya Shankar Kapoor aka DK; Pankaj Tripathi – Newton as Assistant Commandant Aatma Singh | Meher Vij – Secret Superstar as Najma Malik; Ratna Pathak Shah – Lipstick Under My Burkha as Usha "Rosy" Buaji; Seema Pahwa – Bareilly Ki Barfi as Susheela Mishra; Seema Pahwa – Shubh Mangal Saavdhan as Sugandha's Mother; Tillotama Shome – A Death in the Gunj as Bonnie Bakshi |
| Best Music Director | Best Lyricist |
| Pritam – Jagga Jasoos; Amaal Mallik, Tanishk Bagchi, Akhil Sachdeva – Badrinath Ki Dulhania; Amit Trivedi – Secret Superstar; Arko Pravo Mukherjee, Tanishk Bagchi, Samira Koppikar, Sameer Uddin and Vayu – Bareilly Ki Barfi; Mithoon, Tanishk Bagchi, Rishi Rich, Farhan Saeed, Rahul Mishra, Ami Mishra – Half Girlfriend; Pritam – Jab Harry Met Sejal | Amitabh Bhattacharya – "Ullu Ka Pattha" – Jagga Jasoos; Amitabh Bhattacharya – "Galti Se Mistake" – Jagga Jasoos; Arko Pravo Mukherjee – "Nazm Nazm" – Bareilly Ki Barfi; Kausar Munir – "Maana Ke Hum Yaar Nahin" – Meri Pyaari Bindu; Kausar Munir – "Nachdi Phira" – Secret Superstar; Santanu Ghatak – "Rafu" – Tumhari Sulu |
| Best Playback Singer – Male | Best Playback Singer – Female |
| Arijit Singh – "Roke Na Ruke Naina" – Badrinath Ki Dulhania; Akhil Sachdeva – "Humsafar" – Badrinath Ki Dulhania; Arijit Singh – "Zaalima" – Raees; Arko Pravo Mukherjee – "Nazm Nazm" – Bareilly Ki Barfi; Ash King – "Baarish" – Half Girlfriend; Sachin Sanghvi – "Kho Diya" – Bhoomi | Meghna Mishra – "Nachdi Phira" – Secret Superstar; Monali Thakur – "Khol De Baahein" – Meri Pyaari Bindu; Nikhita Gandhi – "Ghar" – Jab Harry Met Sejal; Ronkini Gupta – "Rafu" – Tumhari Sulu; Shashaa Tirupati – "Kanha" – Shubh Mangal Saavdhan; Shreya Ghoshal – "Thodi Der" – Half Girlfriend |

=== Critics' awards ===
Nominations for the critics award was announced on 19 January 2018.

Best Film (Best Director)
Newton – Amit V Masurkar; A Death in the Gunj – Konkona Sen Sharma; Lipstick Under My Burkha – Alankrita Shrivastava; Mukti Bhawan – Shubhashish Bhutiani; Trapped – Vikramaditya Motwane
| Best Actor | Best Actress |
| Rajkummar Rao – Trapped; Irrfan Khan – Hindi Medium; Rajkummar Rao – Newton; Ranbir Kapoor – Jagga Jasoos; Vikrant Massey – A Death in the Gunj | Zaira Wasim – Secret Superstar; Kangana Ranaut – Rangoon; Sridevi – Mom; Swara Bhaskar – Anaarkali of Aarah; Vidya Balan – Tumhari Sulu |

==== Special awards ====
Lifetime Achievement Award
- Mala Sinha
- Bappi Lahiri
RD Burman Award

Not Awarded

Best Debut Director
- Konkona Sen Sharma – A Death in the Gunj

==== Technical awards ====
| Best Story | Best Screenplay |
|---|---|
| Amit V Masurkar – Newton; Amit Joshi – Trapped; Rahul Dahiya – G Kutta Se; Shanker Raman and Sourabh Ratnu – Gurgaon; Shubhashish Bhutiani – Mukti Bhawan; Suresh Triveni – Tumhari Sulu | Shubhashish Bhutiani – Mukti Bhawan; Advait Chandan – Secret Superstar; Amit Joshi and Hardik Mehta – Trapped; Mayank Tewari and Amit V. Masurkar – Newton; Subhash Kapoor – Jolly LLB 2 |
| Best Dialogue | Best Editing |
| Hitesh Kewaliya – Shubh Mangal Saavdhan; Mayank Tewari and Amit V. Masurkar – Newton; Nitesh Tiwari and Shreyas Jain – Bareilly Ki Barfi; Subhash Kapoor – Jolly LLB 2; Suresh Triveni and Vijay Maurya – Tumhari Sulu | Nitin Baid – Trapped; Aarif Sheikh and Manas Mittal – A Death in the Gunj; Monisha R. Baldawa – Mom; Shweta Venkat Mathew – Newton |
| Best Choreography | Best Cinematography |
| Vijay Ganguly and Ruel Dausan Varindani for Galti Se Mistake – Jagga Jasoos; Ganesh Acharya for Badri Ki Dulhania – Badrinath Ki Dulhania; Shiamak Davar for Ullu Ka Pattha – Jagga Jasoos; Sudesh Adhana for Bloody Hell – Rangoon; Vijay Ganguly for Khaana Khaake – Jagga Jasoos; Vijay Ganguly for Bann Jaa Tu Meri Rani – Tumhari Sulu | Sirsha Ray – A Death in the Gunj; Jessica Lee Gagné and Pankaj Kumar – Daddy; Pankaj Kumar – Rangoon; Ravi Varman – Jagga Jasoos; Swapnil S. Sonawane – Newton |
| Best Production Design | Best Sound Design |
| Parul Sondh – Daddy; Anita Rajgopalan Lata and Donal Raegan Gracy – Raees; Siddharth Sirohi – A Death in the Gunj; Subrata Chakraborty and Amit Ray – Rangoon | Anish John – Trapped; Baylon Fonseca and Dhiman Karmakar – Raees; Nihar Ranjan Samal – Mom; Subhash Sahoo – Tumhari Sulu; Udit Duseja – Daddy |
| Best Costume Design | Best Background Score |
| Rohit Chaturvedi – A Death in the Gunj; Dolly Ahluwalia – Rangoon; Nidhi and Divya Gambhir – Daddy | Sambhavna Seth – Jagga Jasoos; Alokananda Dasgupta – Trapped; A. R. Rahman – Mom; Naren Chandavarkar and Benedict Taylor – Daddy; Sagar Desai – A Death in the Gunj; Tajdar Junaid – Mukti Bhawan |
| Best Special Effects | Best Action |
| Not Awarded | Tom Struthers – Tiger Zinda Hai; Allan Amin– Jagga Jasoos; Franz Spilhaus – Commando 2; Harpal Singh Pali and Ravi Kumar – Rangoon; K. Ravi Varma – Raees |
Best Short film (People's Choice)
Anahut – Umesh Bagade
| Best Short Film (Fiction) | Best Short Film (Non-Fiction) |
| Juice – Neeraj Ghaywan | Invisible Wings – Hari M. Mohanan |
| Best Actor in a Short Film | Best Actress in a Short Film |
| Jackie Shroff – Khujli | Shefali Shah – Juice |

==== Multiple nominations ====
| Nominations | Film |
|---|---|
| 10 | Jagga Jasoos; Secret Superstar |
| 9 | Tumhari Sulu |
| 8 | A Death in the Gunj; Badrinath Ki Dulhania; Bareilly Ki Barfi; Newton |
| 7 | Trapped |
| 6 | Hindi Medium; Mom |
| 5 | Daddy; Rangoon; Raees; Shubh Mangal Saavdhan |
| 4 | Mukti Bhawan |
| 3 | Half Girlfriend; Toilet: Ek Prem Katha |
| 2 | Jab Harry Met Sejal; Jolly LLB 2 Lipstick Under My Burkha; Meri Pyaari Bindu |

==== Multiple awards ====
| Awards | Film |
|---|---|
| 4 | Jagga Jasoos |
| 3 | A Death in the Gunj; Secret Superstar; Trapped |
| 2 | Bareilly Ki Barfi; Hindi Medium; Newton |

== See also ==
- Filmfare Awards
