= Meghna Mishra =

Indian playback singer

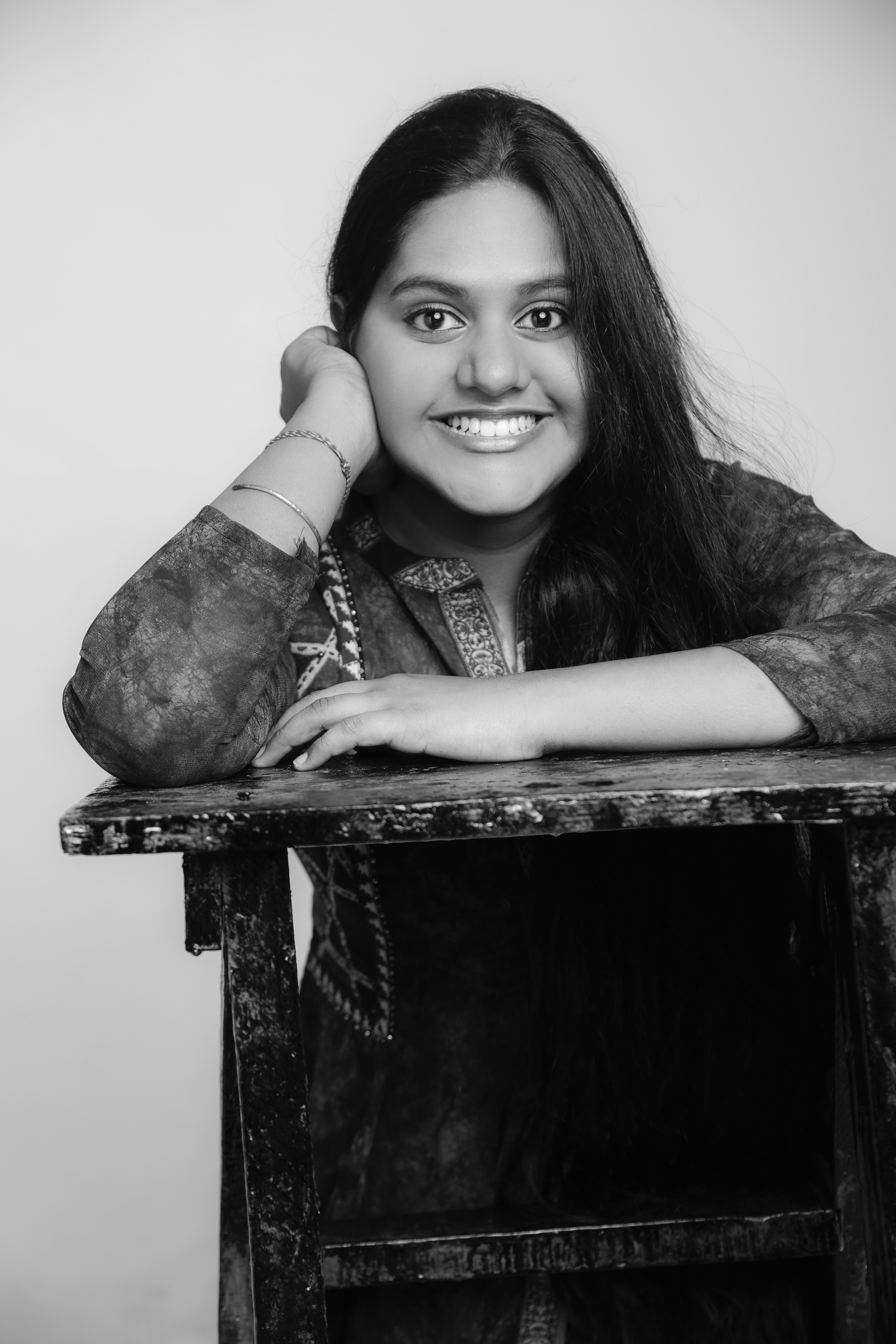
- Self-portrait photograph

Background information
- Born: Meghna Mishra; July 23, 2001 (age 24); Mumbai, India
- Occupation: Playback Singer
- Years active: 2014–present

Meghna Mishra is an Indian playback singer, mainly a selected playback singer of music director Amit Trivedi. She delivered 2 superhit tracks, "Nachdi Phira" and "Main Kaun Hoon", in the 2017 film Secret Superstar starring Zaira Wasim, Meher Vij and Aamir Khan. She won Best Female Playback Singer for "Nachdi Phira" at the 63rd Filmfare Awards. The song "Main Kaun Hoon" was picked as one of the best Hindi songs of 2017 by an online portal. The songs were written by Kausar Munir and composed by Amit Trivedi.

== Discography ==
Year	Movie	Song(s)	Music	Lyrics	Co-singer(s)	Language
2014	Kkoli: A Journey of Love	"Elitin Beletin"	Meet Bros Anjjan	Rana Mazumder	Aryan Bhattcharya	Bengali
2014	Vitti Dandu	"Chalaa Kheluya Vitti Daandoo"	Santosh Mulekar	Shrirang Godbole		Marathi
2017	Secret Superstar	"Main Kaun Hoon"	Amit Trivedi	Kausar Munir		Hindi
2017	Secret Superstar	"Meri Pyaari Ammi"	Amit Trivedi	Kausar Munir		Hindi
2017	Secret Superstar	"Nachdi Phira"	Amit Trivedi	Kausar Munir		Hindi
2017	Secret Superstar	"Sapne Re"	Amit Trivedi	Kausar Munir		Hindi
2017	Secret Superstar	"O Re Manwa"	Amit Trivedi	Kausar Munir		Hindi
2018	Manmarziyaan	"Kundali"	Amit Trivedi	Shellee	Meenal Jain, Yashita Sharma, Yashika Sikka, Rani Kaur, Anita Gandharva, Vaishnavi Mishra	Hindi
2019	Tritiya Adhyay	"Hazar Bochor"	Arin		Papon	Bengali
2021	Pagglait	"Dil Udd Ja Re" (Revisited)	Arijit Singh	Neelesh Misra	Arijit Singh	Hindi
2026	Ek Din	"Behke Yaar"	Ram Sampath	Irshad Kamil	Arijit Singh	Hindi
2026	Ek Din	"Ek Din (Title Track Female)"	Ram Sampath	Irshad Kamil		Hindi

== Awards and nominations ==
Year	Award	Category	Nominated Work	Result	Ref.
2018	Filmfare Awards	Best Playback Singer (Female)	"Nachdi Phira" (Secret Superstar)	Won	
2018	Zee Cine Awards	Best Playback Singer (Female)	"Main Kaun Hoon" (Secret Superstar)	Nominated	
2018	Mirchi Music Awards	Upcoming Female Vocalist of the year	"Main Kaun Hoon" (Secret Superstar)	Won	
2018	Mirchi Music Awards	Upcoming Female Vocalist of the year	"Meri Pyaari Ammi" (Secret Superstar)	Nominated	
2018	Mirchi Music Awards	Upcoming Female Vocalist of the year	"Nachdi Phira" (Secret Superstar)	Nominated	
2018	Bollywood Film Journalistic Awards	Best Playback Singer (Female)	"Main Kaun Hoon" (Secret Superstar)	Won	
2018	Bollywood Film Journalistic Awards	Best Playback Singer (Female)	"Nachdi Phira" (Secret Superstar)	Won	
2018	News18 Reel Movie Awards	Best Playback Singer (Female)	"Nachdi Phira" (Secret Superstar)	Won	
2018	IIFA Awards	Best Playback Singer (Female)	"Main Kaun Hoon" (Secret Superstar)	Won	
