= Nachdi Phira =

Nachdi Phira is a song from the 2017 Hindi film Secret Superstar. The song was composed by Amit Trivedi, with lyrics by Kausar Munir and vocals by Meghna Mishra. The full song was released, along with the film's soundtrack on 21 September 2017, while the music video was released on 1 October 2017. Trivedi, Munir and Mishra each received nominations for Best Music, Best Lyrics and Best Female Playback Singer respectively at the 63rd Filmfare Awards, with Mishra winning in her category. The song was picked as one of the best Hindi songs of 2017 by an online portal.

== Cantonese version ==
For the film's Hong Kong release, a Cantonese version has been sung by Cantopop star Kay Tse. The Cantonese version of the song is entitled "Ko Sing Yue Cho" and was released digitally on 11 April 2018.

== Awards ==
Year	Award	Nominee	Result
2018	Filmfare Award for Best Music	Amit Trivedi	Nominated
2018	Filmfare Award for Best Lyrics	Kausar Munir	Nominated
2018	Filmfare Award for Best Female Playback Singer	Meghna Mishra	Won
2017	Mirchi Music Award for Upcoming Female Vocalist of The Year	Meghna Mishra	Nominated
