= Main Kaun Hoon =

2017 Hindi song

Main Kaun Hoon is a Hindi song from 2017 film Secret Superstar. Meghna Mishra won Film of India Online Award for Best Female Playback Singer for the song and nominated for Screen Awards. It is written by Kausar Munir and composed by Amit Trivedi with Aamir Khan. The song was released as a single on 23 August 2017 and the music video was released on 25 August. Both were nominated for Screen Awards. The song was picked as one of the best Hindi songs of 2017 by an online portal.

For the film's China release, a Mandarin Chinese version of the song was released on 17 January 2018, and sung by actor-singer Huang Bo. He was previously Aamir Khan's voice actor for the Mandarin dub of 3 Idiots.

== Awards ==
Year	Award	Nominee	Result
2018	Film of India Award for Best Female Playback Singer	Meghna Mishra	Won
2018	Screen Awards for Best Female Playback Singer	Meghna Mishra	Nominated
2018	Screen Awards for Best Lyrics	Kausar Munir	Nominated
2018	Screen Award for Best Music Director	Amit Trivedi	Nominated
2017	Mirchi Music Award for Upcoming Female Vocalist of The Year	Meghna Mishra	Won
