= Mom (film) =

2017 Indian film by Ravi Udyawar

- Theatrical release poster
- Directed by: Ravi Udyawar
- Screenplay by: Girish Kohli
- Story by: Ravi Udyawar; Girish Kohli; Kona Venkat
- Produced by: Sunil Manchanda; Naresh Agarwal; Mukesh Talreja; Gautam Jain; Boney Kapoor
- Starring: Sridevi; Sajal Aly; Akshaye Khanna; Nawazuddin Siddiqui; Adnan Siddiqui
- Cinematography: Anay Goswamy
- Edited by: Monisha R. Baldawa
- Music by: Score: A. R. Rahman; Qutub-E-Kripa; Songs: A. R. Rahman
- Production companies: Zee Studios; MAD Films; Third Eye Pictures; BSK Film Network
- Distributed by: Zee Studios; PVR Pictures; Zee Studios International
- Release date: 7 July 2017
- Running time: 148 minutes
- Country: India
- Language: Hindi
- Budget: ₹30 crore
- Box office: ₹175.7 crore

Mom is a 2017 Indian Hindi-language crime thriller film directed by Ravi Udyawar, with a screenplay by Girish Kohli. The film stars Sridevi as a woman who sets out to avenge her stepdaughter after she is raped at a party. The film co-stars Nawazuddin Siddiqui, Akshaye Khanna, and Pakistani actors Sajal Aly and Adnan Siddiqui. The music of the film was composed and produced by A. R. Rahman.

Mom was released on 7 July 2017 in four languages. It was a global blockbuster, grossing ₹175.7 crore (US$18 million) worldwide. The film received positive reviews from critics, with Sridevi receiving widespread acclaim for her performance. It was her 300th (and final) major film appearance before her death on 24 February 2018.

Mom received two awards at the 65th National Film Awards: Best Actress (Sridevi, the first posthumous award in that category) and Best Background Score (Rahman). The film received six nominations at the 63rd Filmfare Awards, including Best Actress and Best Actress (Critics) (both for Sridevi) and Best Supporting Actor (Siddiqui).

== Plot ==
Devki Sabarwal is a vivacious biology teacher who is popular with her students. However, her stepdaughter Arya rebuffs her attempts to build a relationship despite Devki's persistence and warmth, as she still misses her biological mother. One day in class, a student Mohit Chadda sends Arya an inappropriate video; Devki throws his phone out the window. When Arya is invited to a Valentine's Day party at Zodiac Farms, Devki and Arya's father Anand reluctantly allow her to go. Arya rejects the advances of Mohit and his cousin, Charles Deewan, at the party. Angered by the public rejection, Charles, Mohit, their criminal friend Joginder "Jagan" Singh, and farmhouse security guard Baburam Yadav ambush and kidnap Arya when she leaves the party. They brutally gang rape and strangle her, then dump her in a roadside ditch, leaving her for dead. Arya is found barely alive by a man walking his dog the next morning, and brought to a hospital; Devki and Anand are shattered. She suffers serious internal injuries, but recovers over the next month and names her attackers.

Inspector Mathew Francis quickly rounds up the perpetrators; however, the case falls apart when Arya is found to have consumed alcohol at the party, raising the possibility that her memory is unreliable. In addition, the tardily-collected semen samples are too weak to match those of her attackers. The four men are acquitted due to a lack of evidence. Arya, in shock and broken by the verdict, withdraws and tears away from Devki. The family's lawyer suggests appealing to a higher court, but Devki has lost her faith in the legal system.

Devki remembers a shady detective, Dayashankar Kapoor ("DK"), whom she had met at the police station on the night of the crime. Having a daughter himself, DK understands her pain and agrees to help her seek revenge for Arya's ordeal. Devki enlists her former students to attack Baburam, and they seduce and drug him. He awakens four days later, still drunk and remembering nothing, and discovers that he has been castrated. In a state of shock, he dies in an accident. Devki then breaks into Charles' home and mixes crushed apple seeds, a source of cyanide, into his powdered nutritional supplement. Charles is paralysed, and when Mohit visits him at the hospital, Devki (tipped off by DK) plants apple seeds and other evidence at Mohit's home; however, she leaves behind her glasses. Mathew quickly arrests Mohit and he is charged with murder since Charles is dying.

As Devki eliminates each of Arya's attackers, their stories appear on the news, which Arya sees. She starts to believe that a vigilante (perhaps her father) is at work, and is deeply grateful. Mathew also suspects Anand, since he had attacked Mohit in court; he has Anand tailed but learns nothing. Mathew finds Devki's glasses in Mohit's apartment and begins to suspect her. He warns Devki that the fourth man, Jagan, is a hardened criminal and that going after him will endanger her family. Jagan visits Mohit, who is being physically abused by another inmate in prison and insists he was framed. Jagan then visits Charles, who tells him "Mom" before he dies, revealing Devki is the perpetrator. Jagan goes after DK and learns that Devki and her family are on holiday at a snow cottage in Kufri. He kills DK and tracks down Devki. Mathew later finds a hidden camera in DK's glasses and hurries to save Devki.

Jagan cuts the power to the cottage and shoots Anand. He corners Arya but has a scuffle with Devki while Arya flees outside. Jagan chases her, and Devki tries to save her stepdaughter. Jagan is about to kill Devki when Mathew tackles him. In a standoff, Devki and Mathew point their guns at Jagan; Matthew tries to dissuade Devki by telling her that Anand is alive, and she will go to jail if she shoots Jagan. Jagan angrily describes how Devki finished off the other attackers, which Arya overhears. Devki knows that if Jagan is left alive, he will come after her again; Mathew then hands her his gun and urges her to kill Jagan. Devki hesitates, but when an overwhelmed Arya calls her "Mom" for the first time, she shoots Jagan dead. Arya and Devki share a tearful, tender embrace.

== Cast ==
- Sridevi as Devki Sabarwal
- Akshaye Khanna as Inspector Mathew Francis
- Nawazuddin Siddiqui as Detective Dayashankar Kapoor ("DK")
- Sajal Aly as Arya Sabarwal
- Adnan Siddiqui as Anand Sabarwal
- Pitobash Tripathy as Guard Baburam Pandey
- Abhimanyu Singh as Joginder "Jagan" Singh
- Rajshri Deshpande as Kohinoor Kapoor, DK's wife
- R. Madhavan as Puneet Sabarwal (Cameo)
- Adarsh Gourav as Mohit Chadha
- Vikas Verma as Charles Deewan
- Riva Arora as Priya "Piyu" Sabarwal
- Vara Raturi as Sapna, Arya's best friend
- Ivan Sylvester Rodrigues as Arya's school principal
- Tripti Dimri as Swati, Arya's, and Mohit's classmate
- Nary Singh as Devki's one of the former students

== Production ==
=== Casting and development ===
It was announced in early 2016 that Sridevi would star in Boney Kapoor's upcoming women's film, Mom, which would be directed by Ravi Udyawar. Nawazuddin Siddiqui was cast in a leading role, and said that it was a dream come true for him to work with Sridevi. Akshaye Khanna and actors Sajal Aly and Adnan Siddiqui were then cast, and A. R. Rahman was signed to compose the film's music.

=== Filming ===
Filming began in New Delhi in March 2016 near Shri Ram College of Commerce at Delhi University and Noida Film City. Mom was then filmed on a lengthy schedule in Mestia, Georgia. The crew shot in freezing conditions (−7 °C (19 °F)) for over two months. Despite the weather, filming was successful. Shooting resumed in March 2017, and the film's last leg was completed in Bangkok.

== Release and marketing ==
Mom was previewed at the 2017 Zee Cine Awards by Salman Khan, who called Sridevi "a bigger star than the Khans." Sridevi shared the trailer on Twitter, where it went viral. It had 1.2 million views in its first 24 hours on YouTube, and had a positive reception in Pakistan. The trailer's success had distributors in South India asking for a dubbed version of the film. The filmmakers announced that Mom would also be dubbed and released in Tamil, Telugu and Malayalam.

The film was released in China on 22 March 2019, two years after its release in India. Zee Studios International and its distributors, released an international poster for Chinese audiences.

== Reception ==
=== Box office ===
Mom grossed ₹14.25 crore on its first domestic weekend, and had a domestic gross of about ₹51.78 crore. It grossed ₹3.87 crore in North America, ₹164 million in the United Kingdom, ₹4.2 million in Australia, ₹1.4 million in New Zealand, ₹34.5 million in the United Arab Emirates, ₹100,000 in Malaysia, and ₹36 million in the rest of the world, bringing its worldwide 2017 gross to ₹64.9 crore.

The film was released in China on 10 May 2019. It had an opening-weekend gross of US$5.96 million (₹41.8 crore) in that country, ranking fourth behind the Hollywood films Pokémon Detective Pikachu and Avengers: Endgame and the Arabic film Capernaum. By 4 June 2019, Mom had grossed $16.97 million (₹110.8 crore) in China.

=== Critical response ===
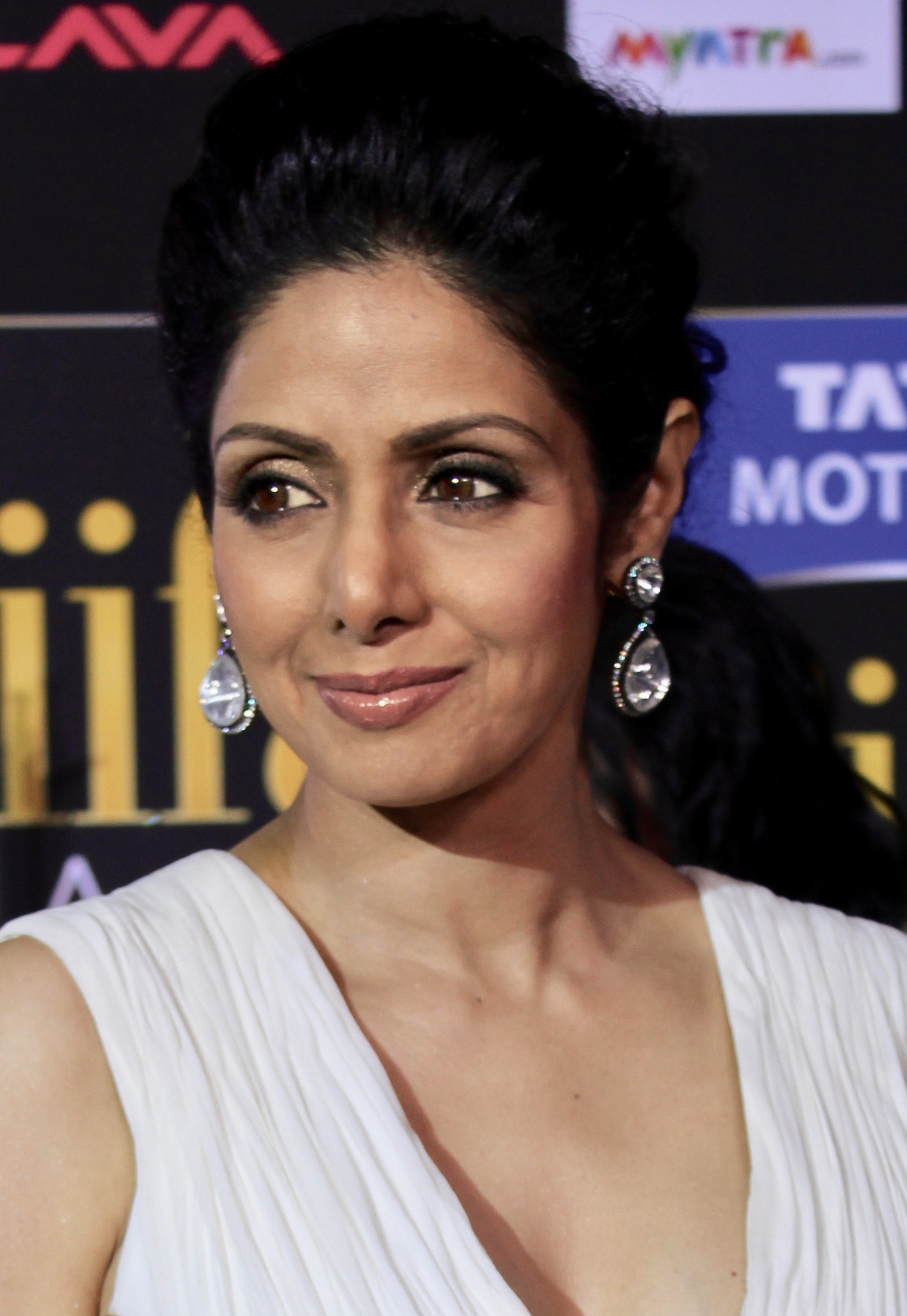
Sridevi's performance in the title role received widespread critical acclaim, earning her the National Film Award for Best Actress.

Mom received positive reviews from critics, with Sridevi's performance receiving widespread critical acclaim. Meena Iyer of The Times of India gave the film four stars out of five and said, "This one still manages to stay ahead with some interesting twists and turns". Sarita A. Tanwar of Daily News and Analysis gave it three stars, saying, "Mom is interestingly cast and that's a major part of the battle won." Shubhra Gupta of The Indian Express gave the film two out of five stars: "The plot is riddled with holes, and is too focused on Sridevi." Saibal Chatterjee of NDTV India gave it 3.5 out of five stars, saying that the film was not a "conventional rape-and-revenge drama" with a "clearly defined moral and emotional context." Mayank Shekhar of Mid-Day gave it three out of five stars; "the filmmakers effectively employ their talent" on the ensemble cast, characters, and "fine passages of photography and production design." According to an IANS review in The Economic Times, "The scenes are cut in a way that they heighten the drama without resorting to hysteria." Kunal Guha of the Mumbai Mirror gave the film 3.5 out of five stars and said, "Several scenes in Mom wordlessly convey more than what can be said through dialogue." Rajeev Masand of News18 India gave it 2.5 out of five stars and said, "Mom is a far from perfect film, but it's never boring." Rohit Vats of Hindustan Times gave the film three stars out of five and said that it "can hold the audience's attention".

Sridevi's performance was highlighted. India Today called the actress "unbelievably good as the mother thirsty for revenge," and NDTV found her "magnificently expressive as the titular figure." A reviewer in The Times of India said that she gave a "captivating performance where she walks you through the entire gamut of emotions with panache", and an Indian Express reviewer wrote: "Sridevi needs only a twitch or a glance to prove that she is a powerhouse and there are several scenes she lifts by just being there." According to Deccan Chronicle, "Turning your eyes elsewhere will be criminal when Sridevi is on screen in the film," and Rediff called the actress "the master of expressivity ... it's classic Sridevi." Rajeev Masand said, "Sridevi's performance elevates Mom to another level". According to a Firstpost review, "Here is a 53-year-old leading actress doing what Amitabh Bachchan once excelled at ... Sridevi is a far more riveting watch than a shirtless Salman Khan with his 6 plus packs or the quintessential middle-aged Hindi film hero, who refuses to grow up ... Suddenly, Bollywood shines bright with hope for the heroine over 50."

Manjusha Radhakrishnan of Gulf News gave Mom 3.5 out of five stars, calling the film a "taut thriller studded with some superlative performances". Sadaf Siddique of Dawn wrote, "It is the riveting performances that hold the narrative together despite its flaws." Rohit Bhatnagar of Deccan Chronicle gave the film three out of five stars in a lukewarm review: "Although the production of the film makes it look grand and fancy, the climax is too dramatic for such an intense film."

=== Awards and nominations ===
Ravi Udyawar directed Mom and the movie was qualified for the 75th Golden Globe Awards in the foreign film category. As this is the last film for Sridevi, Boney Kapoor says that their motive is to share the beautiful story and honor her.

Award	Category	Recipient	Result	Ref.
National Film Awards	Best Actress	Sridevi	Won	
National Film Awards	Best Background Score	A. R. Rahman	Won	
Zee Cine Awards	Best Actress	Sridevi	Nominated	
Zee Cine Awards	Best Actress (Critics)	Sridevi	Won	
IIFA Awards	Best Actress	Sridevi	Won	
IIFA Awards	Best Supporting Actor	Nawazuddin Siddiqui	Won	
Filmfare Awards	Best Actress	Sridevi	Nominated	
Filmfare Awards	Best Actress (Critics)	Sridevi	Nominated	
Filmfare Awards	Best Supporting Actor	Nawazuddin Siddiqui	Nominated	
Filmfare Awards	Best Background Score	A. R. Rahman	Nominated	
Filmfare Awards	Best Editing	Monisha R. Baldawa	Nominated	
Filmfare Awards	Best Sound Design	Nihar Ranjan Samal	Nominated	
Screen Awards	Best Actress	Sridevi	Nominated	
GQ Excellence Awards	Excellence in Acting	Sridevi	Won	
Masala Magazine Awards - Dubai	Outstanding Performance of the Year	Sridevi	Won	
Bollywood Film Journalists Awards	Best Actress	Sridevi	Nominated	
Mirchi Music Awards	Upcoming Male Vocalist of The Year	Sudeep Jaipurwale for "Be Nazaara"	Won	

== Soundtrack ==
Mom

Soundtrack album by A. R. Rahman
- Released: 27 June 2017
- Recorded: 2017
- Studios: ENZY Studios, Mumbai; Panchathan Record Inn and AM Studios, Chennai; A. R. Studios, Mumbai
- Genre: Feature-film soundtrack
- Length: 37:30
- Label: T-Series
- Producer: A. R. Rahman

A. R. Rahman chronology
Sachin: A Billion Dreams (2017)	Mom (2017)	Viceroy's House (2017)

Mom's soundtrack album was released on 27 June 2017 by T-Series. Its first song, "O Sona Tere Liye", was praised; The Indian Express called it as "a soothing balm for a hurt soul," and a Times of India reviewer said that the "song will stir your soul." Rahman received the National Film Award for Best Music Direction (Background Score).

All music is composed by A. R. Rahman.

Hindi version
No.	Title	Lyrics	Singer(s)	Length
1.	"O Sona Tere Liye"	Irshad Kamil	A. R. Rahman, Shashaa Tirupati	05:20
2.	"Kooke Kawn" (Traditional)	Irshad Kamil	Sukhwinder Singh, Blaaze, Sameera Bharadwaj, Altamash Faridi	03:33
3.	"Raakh Baaki"	Irshad Kamil, Rianjali	Jonita Gandhi, Rianjali	05:43
4.	"Freaking Life"	Irshad Kamil, Rianjali	Rianjali, Raja Kumari, Suzanne D'Mello	04:05
5.	"Chal Kahin Door"	Irshad Kamil	Shashaa Tirupati	06:28
6.	"Muafi Mushkil"	Irshad Kamil	Darshana	04:48
7.	"Be Nazaara" (Traditional)		Sudeep Jaipurwale	07:36
Total length:				37:30

Tamil version
No.	Title	Lyrics	Singer(s)	Length
1.	Poongaatre	Thamarai	Anand Aravindakshan, Priyanka NK	05:20
2.	Kooke Kawn	Vivek	Sunder Iyer, Pooja, Sharanya Srinivas, Blaaze	03:33
3.	Raatchasa Thee	Vivek, Rianjali	Isshrath Quadhree, Rianjali	05:43
4.	Netrai Vendru Naan	Kutti Revathi	Saindhavi Prakash (Film Version)/ Shreya Ghoshal (Trailer Version)	06:28

Telugu version
No.	Title	Lyrics	Singer(s)	Length
1.	Poongaatre	Ananda Sriram	Hemachandra, Priyanka NK	05:20
2.	Padhavalu Pakkanolu	Ananta Sriram	Sunil Kashyap, Pooja, Sharanya Srinivas, Blaaze	03:33
3.	Aarthi Agni Jalistundhi	Ananta Sriram, Rianjali	Damini Bhatla, Rianjali	05:43
4.	Erooje Chindhe Chirunave	Rocky	Shashaa Tirupati (Film Version)/ Shreya Ghoshal (Trailer Version)	06:28

Malayalam version
No.	Title	Lyrics	Singer(s)	Length
1.	O Sona	Rafeeq Ahmed	Jithin, Priyanka NK	05:20
2.	Kaandil Ellam	Rafeeq Ahmed	Palakkad Sreeram, Pooja, Sharanya Srinivas, Blaaze	03:33
3.	Agni Jwala	Rafeeq Ahmed, Rianjali	Kavya Ajit, Rianjali	05:43
4.	Onni Poo	Rafeeq Ahmed	Shweta Mohan	06:28

Notes: "Freakin' Life" and "Be Nazaara" were reused in the Tamil, Telugu and Malayalam versions with no changes. "Maafi Mushqil" appears only in the Hindi version. "Be Nazaara" is a traditional composition, arranged by A. R. Rahman for the film.

== See also ==
- 2012 Delhi gang rape and murder
- I Spit on Your Grave
- Death Wish
