= Zee Cine Award for Most Promising Director =

Film award in India

The Zee Cine Award for Most Promising Director is an Indian film award which began in 2005.

In 2002, Zee Cine tried to acknowledge debut directors by creating a Zee Cine Special Award for Debut Director. In 2005, the category for most promising director was made official. A group of juries chose the best candidate out of five nominated directors. The inaugural Zee Cine Award for Most Promising Director was given to Farah Khan for Main Hoon Na.

== Winners ==
Year	Winner	Film
2002	Farhan Akhtar	Dil Chahta Hai
2004	Rajkumar Hirani	Munna Bhai M.B.B.S.
2005	Farah Khan	Main Hoon Na
2006	Pradeep Sarkar	Parineeta
2007	Dibakar Banerjee	Khosla Ka Ghosla
2008	Aamir Khan	Taare Zameen Par
2009	Not Held	
2010	Not Held	
2011	Abhinav Kashyap	Dabangg
2012	Siddique	Bodyguard
2013	Gauri Shinde	English Vinglish
2014	Ayan Mukerji	Yeh Jawaani Hai Deewani
2015	Rajkumar Hirani	PK
2016	Neeraj Ghaywan	Masaan
2017	Aniruddha Roy Chowdhury	Pink
2018	Advait Chandan	Secret Superstar
2019	Amar Kaushik	Stree
2021	Aditya Dhar; Sandeep Reddy Vanga	Uri: The Surgical Strike; Kabir Singh
2022	Not Held	
2022	Not Held	
2023	Jasmeet K. Reen	Darlings

== See also ==
- Zee Cine Awards
- Bollywood
- Cinema of India
