= Zaira Wasim =

Indian actress (born 2000)

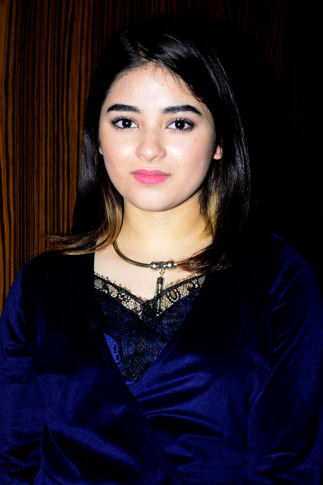
- Wasim in 2019
- Born: 23 October 2000 (age 26); Srinagar, Jammu and Kashmir, India
- Occupation: Actress
- Years active: 2015–2019
- Website: zairawasim.com

Zaira Wasim (born 23 October 2000) is an Indian former actress who worked in Hindi films. The recipient of numerous accolades, including a Filmfare Award and a National Film Award, Wasim was honoured with the Pradhan Mantri Rashtriya Bal Puraskar (formerly National Child Award for Exceptional Achievement) in 2017.

Wasim made her film debut portraying a young Geeta Phogat in the biographical sports film Dangal (2016), which emerged as the highest-grossing Indian film, grossing more than ₹2,000 crore ($300 million) worldwide. She then starred as an aspiring singer in the musical drama Secret Superstar (2017), which became the highest-grossing Indian film with a female protagonist. Both were backed by Aamir Khan Productions and earned her numerous accolades, including the National Film Award for Best Supporting Actress for the former and the Filmfare Award for Best Actress (Critics) for the latter. Her last film appearance was in The Sky Is Pink (2019), which garnered her a nomination for the Filmfare Award for Best Supporting Actress.

Wasim announced her retirement from the film industry in 2019.

== Early life ==
Wasim was born on 23 October 2000 in the Downtown neighbourhood of Srinagar, Jammu and Kashmir, India, into a Kashmiri Muslim family to parents Zahid and Zarqa Wasim. Her father worked as an executive manager at J&K Bank in Srinagar and died in 2024. Her mother is a teacher. She was educated at St. Paul's International Academy in Sonwar, Srinagar.

== Career ==
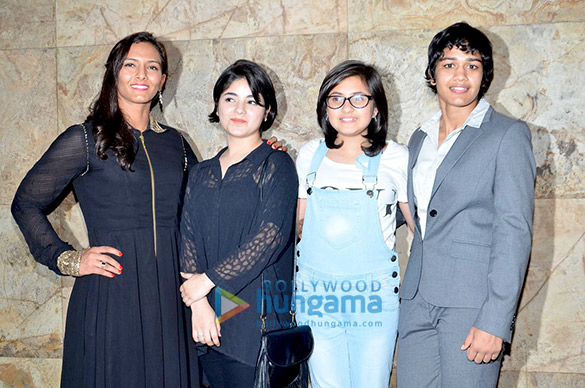
Wasim with Geeta Phogat, Suhani Bhatnagar and Babita Kumari at the special screening of Dangal

In June 2015, Wasim was signed by director Nitesh Tiwari to make her film debut with the biographical sports film Dangal (2016). Principal photography of the film began in September 2015 and she finished her part in December the same year. The film, which narrated the story of pehlwani amateur wrestler Mahavir Singh Phogat (Aamir Khan) who trains his two daughters Geeta (Wasim) and Babita (Suhani Bhatnagar) to become India's first world class female wrestlers, received positive reviews from critics and emerged as the highest-grossing Indian film of all time, earning more than ₹20 billion ($300 million) worldwide. For her performance, Wasim received positive comments as well as several awards, including the National Film Award for Best Supporting Actress and a nomination for the Filmfare Award for Best Female Debut.

The following year, Wasim found her breakthrough role in Advait Chandan's directorial debut Secret Superstar (2017), a musical drama about the story of Insia Malik (Wasim), a 15-year-old teenager who aspires to be a singer. Co-starring with Aamir Khan, Meher Vij, and Raj Arjun, Wasim garnered critical acclaim for her performance and the film eventually emerged as her second consecutive release to earn over ₹9 billion (US$93 million) worldwide, becoming the third highest-grossing Indian film (after Dangal and the 2015 film Bajrangi Bhaijaan) and the highest-grossing Indian film featuring a female protagonist. In addition to several other accolades for the film, Wasim won the Filmfare Award for Best Actress (Critics) and received her first nomination for the Filmfare Award for Best Actress. In November 2017, politician Ram Nath Kovind, the President of India, honoured her with the National Child Award for Exceptional Achievement, for her performances in both Dangal and Secret Superstar.

In March 2019, Wasim completed shooting for her next film The Sky Is Pink, the biopic of motivational speaker Aisha Chaudhary, a 19-year-old girl who died from pulmonary fibrosis. Co-starring Priyanka Chopra and Farhan Akhtar, the film was released in India on 11 October 2019 to critical acclaim, earning her a nomination for the Filmfare Award for Best Supporting Actress.

=== Retirement ===
On 30 June 2019, Wasim announced she would cease her acting career as it conflicts with her religious beliefs and faith. In November 2020, Wasim requested fans to take down her pictures from social media as she was trying to start a new chapter in her life.

== Controversies ==
In 2016, publicity photos of Wasim surfaced showing her with trimmed hair for her role in the film Dangal. This resulted in her being trolled online for having been "un-Islamic" by acting in a film. In January 2017, a local news organisation published the news and photos of her meeting with then Chief Minister Mehbooba Mufti. This resulted in further criticism and Wasim receiving death threats because Mufti had described Wasim as a "Kashmiri role model". In response, Zaira issued an apology on her Facebook and Instagram account which she deleted shortly after. But not before the message was picked up and publicised by news media which added further fuel to the controversy. Subsequently, several Indian celebrities voiced their support for Wasim, denouncing her critics.

In January 2017, Indian sports minister Vijay Goel tweeted a message "Our daughters are breaking out of their cages and moving forward", accompanied by a photo of him standing before a painting depicting two women – one in a hijab and the other cowering in a cage. Wasim responded to Goel requesting him not to connect her to "such a discourteous depiction" and that women in hijab were "beautiful and free". Goel responded that she had misinterpreted his tweet, and that he appreciated Wasim's work and meant to discourage "evil and patriarchal notions".

In December 2017, Wasim alleged that she had been harassed mid-air on Vistara flight UK 981 between Delhi and Mumbai. She posted a series of messages on her Instagram profile alleging that a man sitting behind her on the flight had caressed her neck with his foot while she was asleep. She also wrote that she had tried to record what the man was doing, but failed due to dim lights. The airline issued an apology and released a statement saying that a detailed investigation would be conducted. The accused was subsequently arrested and charged under Protection of Children from Sexual Offences Act (POCSO), given Wasim was a legal minor. The accused's wife claimed her husband had been resting when his leg accidentally touched Wasim and that he had apologised before getting off the plane at the Mumbai airport, which the actress had acknowledged. The suspect had been placed in judicial custody pending a court hearing. There has been support for the accused in the form of a signature-campaign by his neighbours and on social pages. Wasim subsequently became a target of internet trolling, which has been criticised by the Mumbai Police, stating in a tweet, "It is the Constitutional right of every victim to report sexual abuse and it is our duty to take cognizance, investigate and facilitate justice. Kindly refrain from being judgmental and #Respect the Right of a Victim of a Sexual Assault". In a statement included with the tweet, the Mumbai Police also stated, "Our action against the accused is backed by sufficient evidence against him and it has been under the scrutiny by the court of law." In January 2020, the accused was found guilty of molesting Wasim and was sentenced to three years in prison. On appeal by the accused in the Bombay High Court, the sentence was suspended until his appeal was fully heard and decided.

== Filmography ==
| Year | Title | Role | Notes |
|---|---|---|---|
| 2016 | Dangal | Geeta Phogat | |
| 2017 | Secret Superstar | Insia Malik | |
| 2019 | The Sky Is Pink | Aisha Chaudhary | |

== Accolades ==
| Film | Award | Category | Result | Ref. |
|---|---|---|---|---|
| Dangal | 64th National Film Awards | Best Supporting Actress | Won | |
| Dangal | FOI Online Awards | Best Debut Actress | Nominated | |
| Dangal | News 18 Movie Awards | Best Supporting Actress | Won | |
| Dangal | Screen Awards | Most Promising Debut Actress | Won | |
| Secret Superstar | Screen Awards | Most Promising Debut Actress | Won | |
| Secret Superstar | National Child Awards | Exceptional Achievement (also for Dangal) | Won | |
| Secret Superstar | Zee Cine Awards | Best Actress | Nominated | |
| Secret Superstar | Zee Cine Awards | Best Actress (Critics) | Nominated | |
| Secret Superstar | 63rd Filmfare Awards | Best Actress | Nominated | |
| Secret Superstar | 63rd Filmfare Awards | Best Actress (Critics) | Won | |
| Secret Superstar | FOI Online Awards 2018 | Best Actress | Nominated | |
| Secret Superstar | News18 Reel Movie Awards 2018 | Best Actress | Nominated | |
| Secret Superstar | Indian Film Festival of Melbourne | Best Actress | Nominated | |
| Secret Superstar | 19th IIFA Awards | Best Actress | Nominated | |
| The Sky Is Pink | 65th Filmfare Awards | Best Supporting Actress | Nominated | |
| The Sky Is Pink | FOI Online Awards 2020 | Best Supporting Actress | Nominated | |
| The Sky Is Pink | 26th Screen Awards | Best Supporting Actress | Nominated | |

== Personal life ==
In October 2025, Wasim announced her marriage through her official Instagram account, sharing photographs from a private nikāḥ ceremony.
