= Advait Chandan =

Indian filmmaker (born 1987)

- Occupations: Film director, screenwriter
- Years active: 2017–present

Advait Chandan is an Indian film director who works primarily in Hindi films. He made his directorial debut in 2017 with the film Secret Superstar.

== Career ==
In 2007, Advait started his career as the third assistant director and Taare Zameen Par as the assistant production manager. Collaborating with Aamir Khan again, Advait worked as the casting director and post-production supervisor on Kiran Rao's debut venture Dhobi Ghat.

After donning various roles in the film industry, Advait finally made his directorial debut in 2017 with the film Secret Superstar featuring Aamir Khan and Zaira Wasim in the lead. He also wrote the screenplay of the film. It was the highest-grossing 2017 Hindi film and the second-highest-grossing Hindi film of all time behind only Dangal (2016). It is also the third-highest-grossing Indian film of all time behind only Dangal and Baahubali 2: The Conclusion (2017), after surpassing Aamir Khan's own PK (2014). His most recent film as a director is the Junaid Khan and Khushi Kapoor starrer Loveyapa which was released on 7 February 2025.

== Filmography ==
=== As director ===
Year	Title	Notes
2017	Secret Superstar	Also writer
2022	Laal Singh Chaddha	
2025	Loveyapa	
2028	Bura Na Maano Holi Hai!	

=== Other credits ===
Year	Title	Director	Notes
2007	Taare Zameen Par	No	Assistant production manager
2007	Honeymoon Travels Pvt. Ltd.	Assistant	Also portrayed Hippy boy 1
2009	Positive	Assistant	Short film
2009	Bollywood Hero	Assistant	
2010	Dhobi Ghat	Assistant	Also casting director and post production supervisor

== Accolades ==
Year	Awards	Category	Work	Result	Ref
2017	Zee Cine Awards	Best Director	Secret Superstar	Nominated	
2017	Zee Cine Awards	Best Writer	Secret Superstar	Nominated	
2017	Zee Cine Awards	Most Promising Director	Secret Superstar	Won	
2017	Screen Awards	Most Promising Debut Director	Secret Superstar	Nominated	
2018	63rd Filmfare Awards	Best Director	Secret Superstar	Nominated	
2018	63rd Filmfare Awards	Best Screenplay	Secret Superstar	Nominated	
2018	Indian Film Festival of Melbourne	Best Director	Secret Superstar	Nominated	
2018	News18 Reel Movie Awards	Best Screenplay	Secret Superstar	Nominated	
