= Tumhari Sulu =

2017 Indian film by Suresh Triveni

- Theatrical release poster
- Directed by: Suresh Triveni
- Written by: Story & Screenplay: Suresh Triveni; Dialogues & Additional Screenplay: Vijay Maurya
- Produced by: Bhushan Kumar; Tanuj Garg; Krishan Kumar; Atul Kasbekar; Shanti Sivaram Maini
- Starring: Vidya Balan; Neha Dhupia; Manav Kaul; Abhishek Sharma
- Cinematography: Saurabh Goswami
- Edited by: Shivkumar V. Panicker
- Music by: Songs: Guru Randhawa; Rajat Nagpal; Tanishk Bagchi; Amartya Bobo Rahut; Laxmikant–Pyarelal; Santanu Ghatak; Score: Karan Kulkarni
- Production companies: T-Series Films; Ellipsis Entertainment
- Distributed by: AA Films
- Release date: 17 November 2017
- Running time: 140 minutes
- Country: India
- Language: Hindi
- Budget: ₹20 crore
- Box office: ₹51.39 crore

Tumhari Sulu (transl. Your Sulu) is a 2017 Indian Hindi-language comedy-drama film written and directed by Suresh Triveni and produced by Bhushan Kumar, Tanuj Garg, Krishan Kumar, Atul Kasbekar and Shanti Sivaram Maini under the banners of T-Series and Ellipsis Entertainment.

Tumhari Sulu stars Vidya Balan as the titular character, an ambitious housewife who becomes a radio jockey for a late-night relationship advice show. Manav Kaul and Neha Dhupia co-star as Sulu's husband and boss, respectively. Tumhari Sulu was released worldwide on 17 November 2017, to become both a critical and a decent box office success which earned over ₹513.9 million on a ₹200 million budget.

At the 63rd Filmfare Awards, Tumhari Sulu received 9 nominations, including Best Supporting Actor (Kaul), with Balan winning her fourth Best Actress award at the ceremony. It was remade in Tamil as Kaatrin Mozhi (2018) with Jyothika reprising Vidya's role.

== Plot ==
Sulochana Dubey, nicknamed Sulu, is a middle-class housewife living in Virar with her family. She enjoys her life to the fullest with her husband Ashok and 11-year-old son Pranav. Sulu dreams of being a working woman, but since she couldn't complete high school, she is unable to apply for white-collar jobs. Her elder twin sisters mock her, seeing Sulu as beneath them due to her education. Ashok works as a manager in a tailoring firm; a frustrating job since all his colleagues are cantankerous and over the age of sixty. To make matters worse, the firm is taken over by the owner's grandson, who is extremely rude and abusive to his employees. Sulu and Ashok's son, Pranav, is going through a rough time in school. He is incessantly teased by a group of delinquent classmates who sell R-rated magazines and videos.

One day, Sulu wins a contest hosted by her favourite radio station and goes to collect her prize. While at the station, she sees a poster advertising auditions for an RJ, and feels that this is the job she is meant for. Sulu meets the boss, Maria, who finds her extroverted nature intriguing and gives her an opportunity to audition. Sulu laughs throughout the audition but at the end, says 'Hello' in a sensual tone, which impresses Maria. Inspired by her performance, Maria asks Sulu to do a call-in night show, where people would call her to talk about their problems and she agrees.

Ashok is irritated at first that Sulu took up the job without discussing it with him but relents out of love for his wife. On her first day, Sulu faces a rude caller who tries to change their chat into an obscene one, but is able to tactfully handle it. Next, she gets a request to sing, and excitedly does a song she only sings for her husband. Ashok is annoyed by her behaviour, his displeasure further exacerbated by his frustrations with his new boss who treats him terribly. Sulu's family disagrees with the tone of her show and wants her to quit, but Ashok stands by her. The show becomes successful and Sulu enjoys her work, growing more worldly and confident. However, Ashok continues taking out his frustrations at home about both his job and her. Sulu's life becomes high at work and low at home.

One day, the principal of Pranav's school reveals that he has been charging other kids for showing adult videos on a phone he stole from Ashok, as well as faking his father's signatures. Pranav is suspended from school, which becomes a serious issue at home. Sulu's sisters blame her, claiming that she has neglected her son because of her job and her low level of education is influencing him. They say she has to quit but Sulu takes a tough stand, rejecting their conditions. She later gets a call that Pranav is missing. Sulu and Ashok find a note by him, revealing he is ashamed of what he has done and is sad that his mother had to leave her job because of him. Pranav requests his father to support his mother and her work. Ashok and Sulu reconcile as they search for their son.

The police find Pranav the next day and bring him home. Sulu resigns from the show, feeling that she is not able to handle the conflict it is causing at home. As she leaves, Sulu finds the receptionist arguing with the tiffin service guy. She has an idea and requests Maria to give her the tiffin service contract. In the end, Ashok is now managing the tiffin business and Sulu resumes her radio jockey job, managing both the household and her professional life in her own style.

== Cast ==
- Vidya Balan as Sulochana "Sulu" Dubey
- Manav Kaul as Ashok Dubey, Sulu's husband
- Vijay Maurya as Pankaj Rai Baaghi, poet and creator of the late night talk show at the radio station 'Radio Wow'
- Neha Dhupia as Maryam "Maria" Sood, Sulu's employer at 'Radio Wow'
- RJ Malishka as RJ Albeli Anjali, Sulu's colleague at 'Radio Wow'
- Abhishek Sharrma as Pranav, Sulu's son
- Ayushmann Khurrana as himself (Special Appearance)
- Mahesh Pillai as School Principal
- Sindhu Shekharan as Aradhana, one of Sulu's elder twin sisters
- Seema Taneja as Kalpana, the second twin sister
- Trupti Khamkar as lady cab driver
- Santanu Ghatak as Sanjay, boss of Ashok Dubey
- Uday Lagoo as Sulu's father
- Hitesh Dave as grocery shop owner
- Shashi Ranjan as Ramesh
- Sonel Singh as Girija – Receptionist at the radio station 'Radio Wow'
- Vibhavari Deshpande as Constable

== Production ==
=== Development ===
The official announcement of the film was made in November 2016.

=== Filming ===
The principal photography of the film commenced in Mumbai on 25 April 2017. The team started the shoot by performing a 'puja' which was attended and blessed by the mothers of the producers and director on 21 April 2017.

== Soundtrack ==
Tumhari Sulu

Soundtrack album by Guru Randhawa, Rajat Nagpal, Tanishk Bagchi, Laxmikant–Pyarelal, Amartya Bobo Rahut & Siddhant Kaushal
- Released: 4 November 2017
- Genre: Feature film soundtrack
- Length: 16:02
- Language: Hindi
- Label: T-Series

Singles from Tumhari Sulu
- 1. "Ban Ja Rani" Released: 16 October 2017; 2. "Hawa Hawai 2.0" Released: 26 October 2017; 3. "Manva Likes To Fly" Released: 3 November 2017

The music of the film is composed by Guru Randhawa, Rajat Nagpal, Tanishk Bagchi, Laxmikant–Pyarelal, Amartya Bobo Rahut and Siddhant Kaushal while the lyrics have been penned by Randhawa, Nagpal, Javed Akhtar, Vayu, Siddhant Kaushal and Santanu Ghatak who sang the song "Rafu". The first song of the film "Ban Ja Rani" from Randhawa's 2016 album "Tu Meri Rani" has been recreated for this film and it was released on 16 October 2017. The second song of the film titled as "Hawa Hawai 2.0" from Anil Kapoor's 1987 film Mr. India has also been recreated for this film by music composer Bagchi and it was released on 26 October 2017. The third single to be released was "Manva Likes To Fly" which is sung by Shalmali Kholgade was released on 3 November 2017. The soundtrack was released by T-Series on 4 November 2017.

Track listing
No.	Title	Lyrics	Music	Singer(s)	Length
1.	"Ban Ja Rani"	Guru Randhawa	Guru Randhawa, Rajat Nagpal	Guru Randhawa	3:46
2.	"Hawa Hawai 2.0"	Javed Akhtar	Tanishk Bagchi, Laxmikant–Pyarelal	Kavita Krishnamurthy, Shashaa Tirupati	2:58
3.	"Manva Likes To Fly"	Vayu	Tanishk Bagchi	Shalmali Kholgade	2:30
4.	"Farrata"	Siddhant Kaushal	Amartya Bobo Rahut	Armaan Malik, Adityan	2:32
5.	"Rafu"	Santanu Ghatak	Santanu Ghatak	Ronkini Gupta	4:16
Total length:					16:02

== Awards and nominations ==
Date of ceremony	Award	Category	Recipient	Outcome	Ref.
2 December 2017	Screen Awards	Best Actress	Vidya Balan	Won	
2 December 2017	Screen Awards	Best Supporting Actress	Neha Dhupia (jointly with Meher Vij for Secret Superstar)	Won	
2 December 2017	Screen Awards	Best Supporting Actor	Manav Kaul	Won	
2 December 2017	Screen Awards	Best Debut Director	Suresh Triveni	Nominated	
30 December 2017	Zee Cine Awards	Best Actor – Female (Viewer's Choice)	Vidya Balan	Nominated	
30 December 2017	Zee Cine Awards	Best Actor – Female (Jury's Choice)	Vidya Balan	Nominated	
30 December 2017	Zee Cine Awards	Best Supporting Actress	Neha Dhupia	Nominated	
30 December 2017	Zee Cine Awards	Best Debutant Director	Suresh Triveni	Nominated	
20 January 2018	Filmfare Awards	Best Actress	Vidya Balan	Won	
20 January 2018	Filmfare Awards	Best Supporting Actor	Manav Kaul	Nominated	
20 January 2018	Filmfare Awards	Best Lyricist	Santanu Ghatak (for the song "Rafu")	Nominated	
20 January 2018	Filmfare Awards	Best Female Playback Singer	Ronkini Gupta (for the song "Rafu")	Nominated	
20 January 2018	Filmfare Awards	Best Original Story	Suresh Triveni	Nominated	
20 January 2018	Filmfare Awards	Best Dialogue	Suresh Triveni, Vijay Maurya	Nominated	
20 January 2018	Filmfare Awards	Best Sound Design	Subhash Sahoo	Nominated	
20 January 2018	Filmfare Awards	Best Choreography	Vijay Ganguly (for the song "Ban Ja Rani")	Nominated	
28 January 2018	Mirchi Music Awards	Upcoming Lyricist of The Year	Santanu Ghatak (for the song "Rafu")	Won	
28 January 2018	Mirchi Music Awards	Raag-Inspired Song of the Year	"Rafu"	Nominated	
22 June 2018	International Indian Film Academy Awards	Best Film	Tumhari Sulu	Won	
22 June 2018	International Indian Film Academy Awards	Best Story	Suresh Triveni	Nominated	
22 June 2018	International Indian Film Academy Awards	Best Director	Suresh Triveni	Nominated	
22 June 2018	International Indian Film Academy Awards	Best Actress	Vidya Balan	Nominated	
22 June 2018	International Indian Film Academy Awards	Best Supporting Actor	Manav Kaul	Nominated	
22 June 2018	International Indian Film Academy Awards	Best Supporting Actress	Neha Dhupia	Nominated	
22 June 2018	International Indian Film Academy Awards	Best Music Director	Guru Randhawa, Rajat Nagpal, Tanishk Bagchi, Amartya Rahut, Santanu Ghatak	Nominated	
10 August 2018	Indian Film Festival of Melbourne	Best Director	Suresh Triveni	Nominated	
10 August 2018	Indian Film Festival of Melbourne	Best Actress	Vidya Balan	Nominated	
