= Ronkini Gupta =

Indian playback singer

- Born: 1984 (age 41–42)
- Education: St Xavier’s College, Mumbai
- Occupation: playback singer
- Known for: Filmfare nominations and acclaimed Classical Singing

Ronkini Gupta (born 1984) is a Hindustani classical vocalist and playback singer who participated in the Saregamapa Popular Choice Award reality show aired on Zee TV in 2004. She sang the critically acclaimed song "Rafu" in Tumhari Sulu (2017) for which she was nominated for Filmfare Award for Best Female Playback Singer. She sang two songs in the 2018 released film Sui Dhaaga for Anu Malik, "Chaav Laaga" with Papon and "Tu Hi Aham" which is her solo song in the film. She is a Sangeet Visharad and her singing repertoire covers Khyaal, Fusion, and Bollywood. Doverlane National Merit and Artist Aloud Award. She has performed with Elan on many stages and has also travelled the world with the Indian Broadway show "Bharati" as the lead vocalist. She composed in Mr Ya Miss (2005) and lent voice to Jai Maharashtra Dhaba Bhatinda (2013), Aankhon Dekhi (2014), Pyaar Vali Love Story (2014), Hrudyantar (2017), Taleem (2016), "Rafu" in Tumhari Sulu (2017), "Chaav Laaga" with Papon and "Tu Hi Aham" as a solo song in Sui Dhaaga. Both the songs in Sui Dhaaga received widespread acclaim and firmly established her as a noteworthy singer of her generation. She is widely known for her ability to superbly blend her classical training with contemporary musicality.

== Early life and musical training ==
Ronkini hails from Jamshedpur, the steel city of India. A distinction holder - Sangeet Visharad from Gandharva Mahavidyalaya in Hindustani Classical, she has trained under, Shri Chandrakant Apte, an exponent of the Gwalior Gharana in her formative years (1990-2000). She has further honed her skills under Ustad Dilshad Khan (2000–01) Pt. Samaresh Chowdhary (2003–04) and Late Ustad Abdul Rashid Khan Sahab (2005-2007).

Winning her way through several inter-school and inter-state level competitions, she went on to win a National Level Merit (Hindustani Classical Vocal category) at the prestigious Dover Lane Music Conference. in Kolkata, in the year 2000 when she was only 16.

== Career ==
She participated in the 2004 edition of Sa Re Ga Ma Pa world series (earlier Sa Re Ga Ma Pa). She became the winner of the contest jointly with Hrishikesh Ranade. Later, she composed two songs for the film Mr Ya Miss titled "Kanha" for Sonu Nigam. Her debut Bollywood playback was for the highly acclaimed film Aankhon Dekhi (2014), directed by Rajat Kapoor. She sang " Rafu" for Vidya Balan in Tumhari Sulu (2017) for which she was nominated for Filmfare Award for Best Female Playback Singer. She was nominated yet again in 2019 for Filmfare Award for Best Female Playback Singer for the chartbuster song Chaav Laga from Sui Dhaaga.

SBroadwayls across the country with her solo recitals and has performed at various prestigious stages namely Sawai Gandharv Mahotsav (2022), Maharana Kumbha Sangeet Samaroh, Udaipur (2022), Pancham Nishad- Pratahswar(2021), Utsaah by Durga Jasraj (2021)Banyan Tree Festival- Barkha Ritu (2020), Kalaghoda Festival (2019), Melbourne Classical Arts Society Festival (2019), to name a few. She released an independently produced Indian classical album titled Mere Kheyaal Se in 2020, where she recorded four tracks in four different ragas, which are her own original bandishes, shot and recorded live. She is often quoted by the musical maestro AR Rahman in his list of favourite artists.

Ronkini Gupta has a band called The Kheyaal-e-Jazz Projekt (Ronkini Gupta Collective), which is a classical fusion band. The band has won the Artist Aloud Music Awards for 2016 and 2018 and has also been featured on Kappa TV with their OSTs- Aye Ri Chandni, Khaare Se Naina and Jhoothi Batiyaan. She has also contributed additional vocals towards Coke Studio Season 4 with Sachin Jigar for the song "Laadki". She sang the highly acclaimed Hamse Toh Woh Behtar Hai for Mukhbir, a Zee OTT presentation, released in 2022.

== Discography ==
=== Composer ===
Year	Film	Song	Singer
2005	Mr Ya Miss	"Kanha"	Sonu Nigam

=== Playback singer ===
Year	Film	Song	Co-singer(s)	Composer
2013	Jai Maharashtra Dhaba Bhatinda	"Awkhalase Sparsh Te"	Rahul Vaidya, Vaishali Samant, Krishna Beura	Nilesh Moharir
2014	Aankhon Dekhi	"Kaise Shukh Soyein"	Solo	Saagar Desai
2014	Pyaar Vali Love Story	"Jahan Jaun Tujhe Paun"	Divya Kumar	Pankaj Padghan, Amitraj and Samir Saptiskar
2016	Taleem	"Ishakacha Baan"	Swapnil Godbole	Praful Karlekar
2017	Tumhari Sulu	"Rafu"	Solo	Santanu Ghatak
2017	Hrudayantar	"Kabhi Mili"	Solo	Praful Karlekar
2017	Dry Day	"Gori Gori Paan"	Trupti K, Atharv S	Ashwin Srinivasan
2018	Sui Dhaaga	"Chaav Laaga"	Papon	Anu Malik
2018	Sui Dhaaga	"Tu Hi Aham"	Solo	Anu Malik
2019	Khari Biscuit	Tula Japnaar Aahe	Adarsh Shinde	Amit Raj
2020	Cheesecake	Tu Chala Kahan	Nihar Shembekar	Santanu Ghatak
2021	Geeli Puchhi- Ajeeb Daastaans	Sang Rehna	Solo	Alokananda Dasgupta
2021	Operation MBBS 2	Jee ke dekhenge	Solo	Kartik Rao
2022	Loop Lapeta	Beqaraar	Solo	Santanu Ghatak
2025	Mangla	All Female Songs	Solo	Santanu Ghatak
2025	Parinati	Aag	Solo	Praful Swapnil

== Awards ==
Year	Award	Song	Film	Result
2016	Artist Aloud Award for Best Composition	"Ritu Basant Ki"	The Kheyaal-E-Jazz Projekt	Won
2018	Artist Aloud Award for Best Hindi Song	"Aye Ri Chandni"	The Kheyaal-E-Jazz Projekt	Won
2018	Filmfare Award for Best Female Playback Singer	"Rafu"	Tumhari Sulu	Nominated
2019	Filmfare Award for Best Female Playback Singer	"Chaav laga"	Sui Dhaaga	Nominated
2019	Star Screen Award for Best Female Playback Singer	Chaav Laaga	Sui Dhaaga	Nominated
2020	Maharashtra Cha Favourite Kon, Zee Talkies Award	Tula Japnaar Aahe	Khari Biscuit	Won
2020	Filmfare Award Marathi for Best Female Playback Singer	Tula Japnaar Aahe	Khari Biscuit	Nominated
2020	Zee Chitra Gaurav Puraskar	Tula Japnaar Aahe	Khari Biscuit	Nominated

Other Awards

- 2000: Doverlane Music Conference : All India Rank 4 in Indian Classical Vocal
- 2018: NITIE Award for Recognition of Significant Contribution in the field of Singing
