= Secret Superstar =

2017 film by Advait Chandan

- Theatrical release poster
- Directed by: Advait Chandan
- Written by: Advait Chandan
- Produced by: Aamir Khan; Kiran Rao; Nitin Keni; Akash Chawla
- Starring: Zaira Wasim; Aamir Khan; Meher Vij; Raj Arjun
- Cinematography: Anil Mehta
- Edited by: Hemanti Sarkar
- Music by: Amit Trivedi
- Production companies: Zee Studios; Aamir Khan Productions
- Distributed by: Zee Studios International (Overseas)
- Release date: 19 October 2017
- Running time: 150 minutes
- Country: India
- Language: Hindi
- Budget: ₹15 crore (US$1.6 million)
- Box office: est. ₹858.43 crore - ₹966 crore (Note: Secret Superstar's reported worldwide grosses vary between ₹858.43 (Box Office India) – ₹966 crore (India Today))

Secret Superstar is a 2017 Indian Hindi-language musical drama film written and directed by Advait Chandan, and produced by Aamir Khan and Kiran Rao under Aamir Khan Productions. The film stars Zaira Wasim, Aamir Khan, Meher Vij and Raj Arjun. The film tells the coming-of-age story of a teenage girl who aspires to be a singer, uploading videos on YouTube while disguising her identity with a niqab, and her relationships with her mother, father and mentor. The film deals with social issues including feminism, gender equality and domestic violence. This marks the penultimate film of Wasim's career in Indian cinema.

The film received positive reviews from critics. Wasim won the National Child Award for Exceptional Achievement. Secret Superstar received ten nominations at the 63rd Filmfare Awards, including Best Film, Best Director for Chandan, Best Actress for Wasim, and Best Supporting Actor for Khan. It won three Filmfare Awards, including Best Actress (Critics) for Wasim, Best Supporting Actress for Vij, and Best Playback Singer (Female) for Meghna Mishra. The film serves as the second collaboration between Wasim and Khan following Dangal (2016).

Secret Superstar became one of the most profitable films of all time, grossing ₹9.05 billion ($154 million) worldwide on a limited budget of ₹150 million (US$2.3 million), with over 6,000% return on investment (ROI). The film is also the highest-grossing Indian film featuring a female protagonist, the highest-grossing 2017 Hindi film, the seventh highest-grossing Hindi film of all-time and the second highest-grossing Indian film overseas. In China, it is the fifth highest-grossing foreign film of 2018, and the second highest-grossing non-English foreign film ever (after Dangal).

== Plot ==
Insia Malik, a 15-year-old girl, lives with her Muslim family in Baroda: her mother Najma, her brother Guddu, her paternal grandmother, and her abusive father Farookh, who often beats his wife. Insia is very passionate about singing, and while her mother supports her, her father is against her dream.

Insia records a song wearing a niqab, so Farookh can't find out her identity, and uploads the video on YouTube under the name of 'Secret Superstar' using a laptop gifted to her by Najma. She becomes an overnight sensation and grabs the attention of Shakti Kumar, a talented but pretentious music director based in Mumbai. He requests Insia to record a song, but she refuses as she hears a lot of negative things about him. Due to Insia’s poor academic grades, Farookh rips out all the strings from her guitar.

The next night, after discovering that Najma sold a valuable necklace to buy Insia's laptop, Farookh thrashes his wife and orders his daughter to throw out the laptop. Insia gets so angry that she snatches the laptop and drops it from the balcony where it falls and shatters on the street. After fleeing from school to record a song for Kumar, she is unable to sing a certain party song. Insia tells this to Kumar, who reveals that it is a remix. He tells her about the original version which was launched ten years ago. After singing the original song, her fame grows and she is nominated for the Best Female Singer. Insia persuades Kumar to arrange a meeting with his ex-wife's lawyer. The lawyer prepares divorce papers for Najma to sign, and gives them to Insia.

Insia gives her mother the divorce papers, but her mother angrily refuses to sign them out of fear they will be left destitute without Farookh. Insia becomes frustrated with her mother, but later reconciles with her, after her grandmother reveals how Najma struggled to keep Insia alive since her birth. Farookh is offered a job in Riyadh and plans to move his family there, as well as marry Insia off to his friend's son. Devastated, she gives up her dream of singing and deletes her YouTube channel. Farookh confirms their departure on the last day of Insia's exams, though Najma promises to ensure her daughter’s education will continue.

When they arrive at the airport, Farookh is unwilling to pay the extra fee for Insia's guitar case and demands that she throw it in the nearest trash can. After initially holding back her emotions, Najma finally stands up for herself in the face of Insia’s heartbreak and boldly protests. She angrily warns Farookh that should he lay his hand on her or their kids, he will face severe consequences and even lose his job in Riyadh. Najma then takes out the divorce papers, signs them, and thrusts them into Farookh's hands. She says her goodbyes to Farookh's mother and storms out of the airport with her children in tow, as a stunned Farookh tries to beg them for forgiveness. Najma borrows a stranger's cell phone and asks Insia to contact Kumar.

All three ultimately end up at the awards ceremony where Insia has been nominated for Best Female Singer. Unfortunately, Insia does not win the award. But the winner, Monali Thakur, graciously dedicates Insia her award, believing she rightfully deserved it. Kumar stands up and calls attention to Insia's presence in the audience. While walking onstage, Insia removes her niqab, revealing her true identity. She dedicates her award to her mother and proclaims her the true 'Secret Superstar' since Najma supported and fought for her even before her birth. She drops the microphone and runs toward her mother, and the two embrace to thunderous applause from the audience.

The screen fades to a message dedicating the movie "To Mothers And Motherhood." Later, Shakti Kumar releases a cheesy party song on YouTube dedicated to Insia.

== Cast ==
- Zaira Wasim as Insia "Insu" Malik
- Aamir Khan as Shakti Kumar
- Meher Vij as Nazma Malik
- Raj Arjun as Farookh Malik
- Farrukh Jaffar as Badi Appa Malik
- Tirth Sharma as Chintan Parekh
- Kabir Sajid as Guddu Malik
- Mona Ambegaonkar as Advocate Sheena Sabavala
- Manuj Sharma as Ranjeet Kumar
- Nitika Anand Mukherjee as Ms. Sheetal
- Shaan as Himself (special appaearance)
- Monali Thakur as Herself (special appearance)

== Production ==
=== Development ===
Chandan conceived of the film during the first season of Aamir Khan's television talk show Satyamev Jayate. While doing the research on the episode about domestic violence, Advait Chandan came across Shanno, a single mother and a victim of domestic abuse. After her husband died, Shanno decided to join a driving school and become a driver so as to run her house, a decision that had the full support of her daughter who was willing to work as a maid so that her mother could go and learn driving. Shanno was successful in becoming a driver and through that she managed to support her house. This story redefined the word hero for Advait Chandan who says, "That is when I realised that my idea of a hero was really narrow. Shanno's daughter is the real hero here. The definition of a hero for me and what I was writing about, it totally changed at that moment."

During the third season of Satyamev Jayate, the first episode narrated the success story of ten year old Shubham Jaglan, son of a milkman and the youngest golf champion of India. Shubham revealed that he learned 60 per cent of Golf through YouTube videos. The story of Shubham further helped Advait Chandan in the development of his film Secret Superstar. Advait says that, "I feel like the middle class is really getting affected by the internet. I never went to film school, but I can sit here and watch a lesson on Stanley Kubrick's camera movements, for example. The internet is empowering the middle class in a way that really needed to be captured on film. That was the umbrella idea—a mother and daughter in middle-class, small-town India getting empowered by this amazing tool that is giving platform to talent."

In July 2015 it was reported that Aamir Khan shall be collaborating with his manager Advait Chandan and music composer A. R. Rahman for a film that was initially titled Aaj Phir Jeene Ki Tamanna Hai. In late April 2016, the title of the film was said to be Secret Superstar. A.R. Rahman later opted out of the film, citing schedule conflicts. He was replaced by Amit Trivedi.

=== Casting ===
Aamir Khan had cast Zaira Wasim, when she was aged 14, in Dangal (2016). Shortly afterwards, Advait told Khan that he was looking for a girl of a similar age for the lead role of his film Secret Superstar, and Khan suggested Wasim. After Advait tested her, he was impressed and cast her in the lead role.

=== Filming ===
Principal photography of the film commenced on 1 September 2016. The film is shot in Vadodara and Mumbai.

The film was produced with a limited budget. Most sources state the production budget is ₹15 crore (US$2.3 million). Rob Cain gives the film's total production and marketing budget as ₹25 crore (US$3.84 million). Box Office India gives its budget as ₹45 crore (US$6.91 million), but it is not known if this includes marketing costs. (Note: The Indian Express describes a "modest budget" of ₹15 crore (US$2.3 million), which they indicate includes print and advertising, figures normally not included when considering a film's budget. Other sources give the film's production budget as ₹15 crore, including PTC Punjabi and Bollywood Life. A budget of US$2.4 million is given by Variety and Firstpost. According to Aamir Khan, its first-week domestic gross (₹41.59 crore) was more than double its budget. Rob Cain describes the production budget as ₹15 crore and the total budget for production and releasing costs as ₹25 crore (US$3.84 million); the film's production budget typically does not include print and advertising.)

== Release ==
=== India ===
Secret Superstar was initially scheduled to release on 4 August 2017, but was later postponed to 19 October 2017. The film released in 1,100 theatres with 1,800 screens in India, and opened on 2,840 screens worldwide. The film made its Indian television debut on Zee Cinema, airing on 24–25 February 2018 in India.

=== Overseas ===
The film released in Taiwan on 24 November 2017, on 73 screens, more than Dangal. It was also announced that Secret Superstar would release in Russia, on 50 screens. The film was released in Russia on 8 February 2018. The same month, it was announced that there are plans to release the film in Japan, South Korea, and Hong Kong. The film had a theatrical release in the Philippines on 31 March 2018. In Japan, the film released on 9 August 2019.

==== China ====
Aamir Khan announced in late October 2017 that he would be planning to release Secret Superstar in China over the next one or two months. The film released in China on 19 January 2018. It is the first Indian film to have a revenue-sharing deal, which is usually reserved for big Hollywood films. Khan's share of Chinese box office revenue will be 25%, compared to his 12.5% share for Dangal. Secret Superstar was released on 11,000 screens in China.

Secret Superstar's China premiere was in Beijing on 16 January 2018, and was attended by director Advait Chandan, actress Zaira Wasim, and singer Meghna Mishra. Khan could not attend, but planned to visit China shortly after the film's release. The premiere was also attended by Chinese filmmakers such as Peter Chan, Tsai Yueh Hsun, Daming Chen, and Zhang Jiajia, and Chinese actors such as the Luu Brothers. The film's reception at the premiere was positive, which includes Hong Kong filmmaker Peter Chan calling it his second-favourite Indian film after 3 Idiots (2009), and writer-director Zhang Jiajia being impressed with the film's theme of empowering women to pursue their dreams. Upon release, the film was promoted with a manhua comic featuring Aamir Khan with the same title as the film.

Khan began his tour of China on 22 January 2018, and was greeted by film star Deng Chao upon arrival. He visited Shanghai, where he was welcomed by large crowds of fans. He then visited Beijing, where he attended the "Red Carpet for Aamir Khan and His Friends" event with Chandan and Wasim, then the Chinese-Indian Film Forum, and the film's press conference. The Chinese-Indian Film Forum, held by CCTV, was attended by a number of Chinese directors, stars, and film critics, including Chinese filmmaker Yu Baimei and Hong Kong filmmaker Stanley Tong, as well as former Olympic champion Liu Guoliang with whom Khan played a competitive ping pong (table tennis) match. Khan was also greeted by actor-singer Huang Bo, as well as other film stars including Liu Yifei and Jackie Chan in video messages.

==== Hong Kong ====
The film released in Hong Kong on 12 April 2018. On 15 April 2018, Aamir Khan arrived in Hong Kong for promotions. Khan and Zaira Wasim attended a promotional event with Hong Kong film star Andy Lau, who Khan has often been compared to by Chinese media. Khan and Wasim also attended the 37th Hong Kong Film Awards, where Khan presented the Best Actor award to actor Louis Koo. On 16 April 2018, Khan attended an event at the University of Hong Kong along with Cantopop singer Kay Tse, who later also attended the film's premiere.

=== Distribution ===
Zee Studios International acquired the rights Internationally.

== Music ==
Initially, Aamir Khan approached A. R. Rahman to compose music for the film. Prasoon Joshi was signed as the lyricist, thus reuniting the trio after Rang De Basanti (2006) and Ghajini (2008). But once the production was delayed, Rahman and Prasoon Joshi opted out of the project citing scheduling conflicts. The music of the film was composed by Amit Trivedi while the lyrics of the film were written by Kausar Munir. The album has eight tracks, with five of them being sung by Meghna Mishra. Mika Singh, Sunidhi Chauhan and Kushal Chokshi sang one song each. The music video of the song "Main Kaun Hoon" was released on 23 August 2017. The full soundtrack album was released on 21 September 2017.

== Reception ==
=== Box office ===
Secret Superstar became one of the most profitable films of all time, grossing ₹905 crore ($154 million), worldwide on a limited budget of ₹15 crore (US$2.3 million), with over 6,000% return on investment (ROI). The film is also the highest-grossing Indian film featuring a female protagonist, the highest-grossing 2017 Hindi film, the fourth highest-grossing Indian film worldwide, and the second highest-grossing Indian film overseas. In China, it is the fifth highest-grossing foreign film of 2018, and the second highest-grossing non-English foreign film ever (after Dangal).

The film's worldwide gross was ₹101 crore by 31 October 2017, and then ₹150 crore (US$23.03 million) by 18 January 2018 prior to its China release. Compared to its limited budget, Secret Superstar became one of the most profitable films of all time. Following its China release on 19 January 2018, it grossed more than ₹900 crore (US$138.2 million) worldwide by 15 February 2018, on a budget of ₹15 crore (US$2.3 million), over 6,000% return on investment (ROI), one of the highest of all time. In comparison, only two films have exceeded $6,000% ROI at the US box office, Paranormal Activity (2009) and The Gallows (2015).

It was the highest-grossing 2017 Hindi film. Secret Superstar grossed ₹905 crore (US$138.97 million) worldwide by 27 February 2018.

Territories	Gross revenue	Footfalls (est.)
India	₹90 crore (US$13.82 million) – ₹64 crore nett	5,087,000
China	¥747.077 million (₹751 crore)	24,884,000
Hong Kong	HK$14 million – US$1,801,802 (₹118 million)	180,000
South Korea	₩86,453,100 ($69,323)	10,758
Russia	US$6,682 (₹4.4 lakh)	1,700
Other territories	₹65 crore (US$9.98 million)	790,000
United States and Canada	US$2,172,000 (₹13.89 crore)	240,000
Arab States of the Persian Gulf (GCC)	₹9.89 crore (US$1.52 million)	160,000
Taiwan	NT$26.2 million – ₹5.8 crore (US$900,000)	114,505
United Kingdom	£628,000 – ₹5.8 crore (US$890,641.51)	82,491
Turkey	US$468,276 (₹3.05 crore)	162,567
European Union		9,261
Australia	A$294,096 – US$212,844 (₹2 crore)	21,000
Overseas total	₹825 crore (US$126.69 million)	31,000,000
Worldwide total	₹905.7 crore (US$154 million)	36,000,000

=== India ===
Secret Superstar grossed ₹41 crore in its first week in India. The film grossed over ₹58 crore after ten days at the domestic Indian box office. By 13 November 2017, the film grossed ₹83 crore (US$12.8 million) in India, including a nett of ₹75 crore. By the end of 2017, the film grossed ₹89 crore in India.

As of 28 January 2018, its domestic gross is ₹90 crore, including a nett ₹64 crore, with footfalls of 5.1 million audiences. It was declared a hit at the Indian box office, and is domestically one of 2017's five most commercially successful Bollywood films, along with Tiger Zinda Hai, Golmaal Again, Raees, and Badrinath Ki Dulhania.

==== Overseas ====
Secret Superstar grossed US$2.8 million overseas in its first weekend, performing well in unconventional markets, entering the top four in Turkey and the top ten in the United Kingdom. The film's overseas gross in its opening weekend was US$2,116,565 in the United Kingdom, United States, Canada, Arab states of the Persian Gulf, Australia and Pakistan. The film grossed US$468,276 in Turkey, as of 19 November 2017, surpassing Dangal's performance in Turkey. In the United Kingdom, Secret Superstar grossed £500,000 (US$684,932) by 30 October 2017, and grossed ₹5.42 crore (US$832,289.13) as of 26 November 2017. It has also grossed ₹13.89 crore (US$2.13 million) in the United States and Canada as of 10 December 2017, and ₹9.89 crore (US$1.52 million) in the Arab states of the Persian Gulf as of 5 November 2017. By 22 November 2017, the film had grossed US$6.48 million (₹42.2 crore) overseas.

In Taiwan, where it released on 24 November 2017, the film grossed US$285,000 (₹1.85 crore) in five days, which is 77% of the amount that Dangal grossed in its first five days there, as of 29 November 2017. The film entered at number three on the Taiwan box office charts. Seventeen days after release, Secret Superstar grossed ₹4.6 crore (US$706,370.85) in Taiwan, where it crossed US$815,000 (₹5.3 crore) by 19 December 2017, increasing the film's overseas gross to ₹49 crore (US$7.52 million). As of 28 January 2018, the film's Taiwan gross is NT$26.2 million, equivalent to ₹5.8 crore (US$900,000). Excluding China, the film has grossed ₹65 crore (US$9.98 million) in other overseas territories as of 28 January 2018.

During its opening weekend in China, the film's overseas gross reached ₹223 crore (US$32.61 million) by 21 January 2018. It established Aamir Khan as the only Indian actor with five films crossing US$20 million overseas, after 3 Idiots (2009), Dhoom 3 (2013), PK (2014), and Dangal (2016). During its opening weekend in China, Secret Superstar emerged as the weekend's highest-grossing film in a single international market, and the second-highest-grossing film overall at the worldwide box office, behind only Jumanji: Welcome to the Jungle (in 93 markets), and above other Hollywood films such as Star Wars: The Last Jedi, Insidious: The Last Key, and Maze Runner: The Death Cure. In its second weekend, Secret Superstar remained the second-highest-grossing film at the international box office, behind Maze Runner and ahead of Jumanji. By 8 February 2018, Secret Superstar grossed US$109.23 million overseas, establishing Aamir Khan as the only Indian actor with two US$100 million overseas grossers. It is the highest-grossing 2017 Indian film overseas, surpassing Tiger Zinda Hai and Baahubali 2: The Conclusion, and the second-highest-grossing Indian film ever overseas, surpassing PK and behind only Dangal.

==== China ====
In China, the film earned US$9.9 million (₹43 crore) in ticket presales by 15 January 2018. Upon release on 19 January 2018, Secret Superstar topped the Chinese box office with a 25.3% market share, followed by Zhang Ziyi starrer Forever Young with a 16% share. By the end of its opening day, Secret Suparstar had grossed US$7.03 million (₹46 crore), surpassing Dangal's US$2.35 million opening to become the biggest debut for an Indian film. The film grossed US$11 million on its second day, remaining at the top of the box office. Its initial two-day gross in China was US$18 million (₹117 crore) by 20 January 2018, surpassing the film's lifetime India gross, as well as surpassing Dangal's initial two-day China gross of ₹44.97 crore (US$6.58 million).

Secret Superstar's opening weekend gross was US$29.2 million (₹200 crore), after its show count rose from 56,000 screenings on Friday to 63,000 on Sunday. It topped the Chinese box office in its opening weekend, despite crowded competition, from Chinese films such as Forever Young and A Better Tomorrow 2018 as well as Hollywood films such as Ferdinand, Wonder, Jumanji: Welcome to the Jungle and Star Wars: The Last Jedi. Secret Superstar's opening weekend gross in China more than doubled its lifetime gross in India. It set the record for the highest opening weekend gross for an Indian film in China, surpassing Dangal, and is the second Indian film in less than a year to top the Chinese box office, after Dangal. Secret Superstar also became the second-highest-grossing Indian film in China, surpassing PK and behind only Dangal. Secret Superstar's weekend gross in China is also the highest single-territory weekend gross for a 2017 Hindi film, surpassing the opening-weekend India gross of Tiger Zinda Hai (₹175 crore) and the Hindi version of Baahubali 2: The Conclusion (₹128 crore).

In four days, the film grossed $33 million (₹215 crore) in China. On its fifth day, its daily show count increased to over 64,000 screenings, and it gained a 33.7% market share of the Chinese box office. In six days, the film grossed $43 million, surpassing the lifetime China gross of Star Wars: The Last Jedi. Secret Superstar's first-week gross in China was $47.1 million (₹307 crore), a record for an Indian film and surpassing the first-week gross of Avatar (2009) in China. On its second Friday, new Hollywood release Maze Runner: The Death Cure took the top spot, before Secret Superstar regained the top spot on Sunday, grossing $20 million in its second weekend. It crossed the ₹400 crore milestone within nine days, and beat Maze Runner to top the weekly box office with $41 million, giving a cume of $70 million grossed in ten days by 28 January 2018, compared to Dangal which grossed ₹417 crore (US$64.03 million) in two weeks. Secret Superstar grossed $77 million in 13 days, surpassing the lifetime China gross of Dwayne Johnson starrer Jumanji: Welcome to the Jungle to become China's highest-grossing foreign film in the first quarter of 2018. In two weeks, Secret Superstar grossed $80 million.

It topped the box office again in its third weekend with $12 million, beating seven new releases, including Hugh Jackman starrer The Greatest Showman, Chinese films Till the End of The World and Boonie Bears: The Big Shrink, and Japanese film Miracles of the Namiya General Store. Secret Superstar also topped the weekly chart again with $26 million, giving a cume of $96 million grossed in 17 days by 4 February 2018. The film remained at the top of the box office in its fourth weekend with $8.7 million, and it topped the weekly box office again with $19 million. As of 18 February 2018, the film's China gross is $124.4 million (₹810 crore), from an audience of 25 million viewers. It was China's third-highest-grossing film in the first quarter of 2018, behind only two domestic productions, and one of the top 70 highest-grossing films ever in China. It also surpassed Japanese anime film Your Name to become the second-highest-grossing non-English foreign film ever in China, after Dangal, and the third-highest-grossing non-English foreign film in any market, after Dangal in China and Crouching Tiger, Hidden Dragon (2000) in North America. Secret Superstar was also the highest-grossing foreign film in China during the first quarter of 2018, ahead of Hollywood films including Black Panther, Pacific Rim: Uprising, Jumanji: Welcome to the Jungle, Tomb Raider, Maze Runner: The Death Cure and Star Wars: The Last Jedi.

==== Hong Kong ====
In Hong Kong, the film's preview gross by 5 April 2018 was HK$1,321,332, equivalent to ₹1.09 crore (US$159,381.19). By 8 April 2018, the film's preview gross was HK$2,6666666261, equivalent to ₹1.78 crore (US$260,273.87), debuting at number four at the weekly box office from previews. On its opening day, 12 April 2018, the film's gross was HK$2,742,482, equivalent to ₹2.28 crore (US$333,384.51). On its second day, the film's gross was HK$3,247,799, equivalent to ₹2.7 crore (US$394,797.45). On its third day, the film's gross was HK$4,163,243, equivalent to ₹3.46 crore (US$505,925.62).

In four days, the film grossed HK$6,059,989, equivalent to ₹5.07 crore (US$741,341.87). In ten days, the film grossed HK$8,953,60, equivalent to ₹7.56 crore (US$1.11 million). In 12 days, the film grossed HK$9.07 million, equivalent to ₹7.62 crore (US$1.11 million). By its third week, the film had grossed HK$11,470,497, equivalent to ₹9.75 crore (US$1.43 million). By its fourth week, the film had grossed HK$12,016,153, equivalent to ₹10.23 crore (US$1.5 million). In 26 days, as of 6 May 2018, the film grossed HK$12.25 million, equivalent to ₹10.3 crore (US$1.51 million). As of 7 September 2018, the film grossed HK$14 million, equivalent to US$1,801,802 (₹118 million).

=== Critical reception ===
On the review aggregator website Rotten Tomatoes, 92% of 13 critics' reviews are positive, with an average rating of 7.1/10. Mike McCahill of The Guardian gave the film a rating of 4 out of 5 stars and praised the film by saying that "This is first-class entertainment, the best imaginable antidote to the toxicity presently leaking out of western movie circles." Meena Iyer of The Times of India gave the film a rating of 4 stars out of 5 and said that, "If your world revolves around your mother, you're going to root for this film."

Rajeev Masand gave the film a rating of 3.5 stars out of 5 describing it as "an inspiring journey towards empowerment, a case for pursuing one's passion against all odds, a testament to the deep mother-daughter bond, and a convincing depiction of teenage years." He praised the performances of the actors with a special mention for the lead actress Zaira Wasim saying "Standing tall amidst a pitch-perfect ensemble, is Zaira Wasim as Insiya, who comes off as something of an old soul trapped in a teenager's body. Wise beyond her years, she is riveting on screen, in the manner in which she appears to sing using her entire being, or the little moments of crushing disappointment and excitement that are reflected on the canvas that is her expressive face."

Saibal Chatterjee of NDTV said Secret Superstar "is a bit like an over-enthusiastic child gifted a new bicycle. It never takes the foot off the pedal. The overlong film could have done with more restraint. It frequently seems to get carried away by the urge not to miss any trick in the book." However, he praised the performances of its actors, saying, "Zaira is an absolute treat—a bundle of miracles! As for the wonderful Meher Vij, one can only ask: where was she all these years? We hope to see more of her on the big screen." He concluded that "Secret Superstar is a winner notwithstanding the bumps along the way." Raja Sen of NDTV gave the film 2.5 out of 5 stars and said, "Aamir Khan has a blast in this sweet and simple film about a young girl who dares to dream."

Rohit Vats of Hindustan Times gave the film a rating of 3 stars out of 5. He highlighted the positive aspects of the film saying that, "Secret Superstar's biggest asset is Aamir Khan. His comedy despite being slapstick in nature, is worth noticing. Zaira Wasim lives up to the expectations and the film has a message." and the negative aspect of the film as well saying that, "Secret Superstar has everything you ask for, but it isn't exceptional storytelling. If there is one thing that can be blamed for it, it's the overt melodrama."

Shubhra Gupta of The Indian Express praised the acting performances and the first half of the movie saying that, "The biggest strength of Secret Superstar is the wonderful Wasim who was also in Dangal. Both Vij as the mother and Arjun as the father are terrific, especially the latter, who doesn't put a foot wrong." but she wasn't impressed with the second half of the film and said that, "The second half slides. The confidence that the narrative shows in the beginning begins to waver as it includes contrivances and predictable curves." She gave the film a rating of 2.5 stars out of 5.

In China, the film also received critical acclaim. Chinese newspaper People's Daily, for example, praised the film for "touching the soul". In Hong Kong, Nicola Chan of South China Morning Post rated the film 4 out of 5 stars. She called it a "crowd-pleaser that explores the sacred mother-daughter bond" and praised the performances of Khan, Wasim and Vij. Richard James Havis of South China Morning Post also rated it 4 out of 5 stars. He called it "a tough story about domestic abuse and female empowerment" and noted "India's energetic and freewheeling style of cinema can offer a new way of telling a story," such as the "idea of having Insia – who does not usually wear a burka – don the garment to disguise herself when she performs on YouTube is very clever, in the sense it's a reasonable way for her to solve her problem of anonymity."

== Awards and nominations ==
Date of ceremony	Award	Category	Recipient(s) and nominee(s)	Result	Ref
16 November 2017	National Child Awards	Exceptional Achievement	Zaira Wasim (also for Dangal)	Won	
4 December 2017	Screen Awards	Most Promising Newcomer – Female	Zaira Wasim (also for Dangal)	Won	
4 December 2017	Screen Awards	Best Actor in a Supporting Role – Female	Meher Vij (jointly with Neha Dhupia for Tumhari Sulu)	Won	
4 December 2017	Screen Awards	Most Promising Debut Director	Advait Chandan	Nominated	
30 December 2017	Zee Cine Awards	Best Actor – Female (Viewer's Choice)	Zaira Wasim	Nominated	
30 December 2017	Zee Cine Awards	Best Actor – Female (Jury's Choice)	Zaira Wasim	Nominated	
30 December 2017	Zee Cine Awards	Best Film (Viewer's Choice)	Secret Superstar	Nominated	
30 December 2017	Zee Cine Awards	Best Film (Jury's Choice)	Secret Superstar	Nominated	
30 December 2017	Zee Cine Awards	Best Writing	Advait Chandan	Nominated	
30 December 2017	Zee Cine Awards	Best Director	Advait Chandan	Nominated	
30 December 2017	Zee Cine Awards	Most Promising Director	Advait Chandan	Won	
30 December 2017	Zee Cine Awards	Best Music Director	Amit Trivedi	Won	
30 December 2017	Zee Cine Awards	Best Actress in Supporting Role	Meher Vij	Won	
30 December 2017	Zee Cine Awards	Best Actor in a Negative Role	Raj Arjun	Won	
30 December 2017	Zee Cine Awards	Best Playback Singer – Female	Meghna Mishra (for the song "Main Kaun Hoon")	Nominated	
30 December 2017	Zee Cine Awards	Best Lyricist	Kausar Munir (for the song "Main Kaun Hoon")	Nominated	
20 January 2018	Filmfare Awards	Best Film	Secret Superstar	Nominated	
20 January 2018	Filmfare Awards	Best Director	Advait Chandan	Nominated	
20 January 2018	Filmfare Awards	Best Screenplay	Advait Chandan	Nominated	
20 January 2018	Filmfare Awards	Best Actress	Zaira Wasim	Nominated	
20 January 2018	Filmfare Awards	Best Actress (Critics)	Zaira Wasim	Won	
20 January 2018	Filmfare Awards	Best Supporting Actor	Aamir Khan	Nominated	
20 January 2018	Filmfare Awards	Best Supporting Actress	Meher Vij	Won	
20 January 2018	Filmfare Awards	Best Playback Singer – Female	Meghna Mishra (for the song "Nachdi Phira")	Won	
20 January 2018	Filmfare Awards	Best Music Album	Amit Trivedi	Nominated	
20 January 2018	Filmfare Awards	Best Lyrics	Kausar Munir (for the song "Nachdi Phira")	Nominated	
24 January 2018	Lions Gold Awards	Best Supporting Actor (Male/Female)	Meher Vij	Won	
28 January 2018	Mirchi Music Awards	Upcoming Female Vocalist of The Year	Meghna Mishra (for the song "Main Kaun Hoon")	Won	
28 January 2018	Mirchi Music Awards	Upcoming Female Vocalist of The Year	Meghna Mishra (for the song "Meri Pyaari Ammi")	Nominated	
28 January 2018	Mirchi Music Awards	Upcoming Female Vocalist of The Year	Meghna Mishra (for the song "Nachdi Phira")	Nominated	
28 January 2018	Mirchi Music Awards	Album of The Year	Amit Trivedi, Kausar Munir	Nominated	
6 March 2018	Bollywood Film Journalists Awards	Best Supporting Actress	Meher Vij	Won	
6 March 2018	Bollywood Film Journalists Awards	Best Male Debut	Tirth Sharma	Won	
6 March 2018	Bollywood Film Journalists Awards	Best Music Director	Amit Trivedi	Won	
6 March 2018	Bollywood Film Journalists Awards	Best Playback Singer – Female	Meghna Mishra (for the song "Nachdi Phira")	Won	
6 March 2018	Bollywood Film Journalists Awards	Best Playback Singer – Female	Meghna Mishra (for the song "Main Kaun Hoon")	Won	
6 March 2018	Bollywood Film Journalists Awards	Best Lyrics	Kausar Munir (for the song "Main Kaun Hoon")	Won	
20 March 2018	News18 Reel Movie Awards	Best Supporting Actress	Meher Vij	Won	
20 March 2018	News18 Reel Movie Awards	Best Playback Singer – Female	Meghna Mishra (for the song "Nachdi Phira")	Won	
20 March 2018	News18 Reel Movie Awards	Best Actress	Zaira Wasim	Nominated	
20 March 2018	News18 Reel Movie Awards	Best Screenplay	Advait Chandan	Nominated	
20 March 2018	News18 Reel Movie Awards	Best Sound	Amit Trivedi	Nominated	
22 June 2018	International Indian Film Academy Awards	Best Playback Singer – Female	Meghna Mishra (for the song "Main Kaun Hoon")	Won	
22 June 2018	International Indian Film Academy Awards	Best Actress	Zaira Wasim	Nominated	
22 June 2018	International Indian Film Academy Awards	Best Supporting Actress	Meher Vij	Won	
10 August 2018	Indian Film Festival of Melbourne	Best Film	Secret Superstar	Nominated	
10 August 2018	Indian Film Festival of Melbourne	Best Director	Advait Chandan	Nominated	
10 August 2018	Indian Film Festival of Melbourne	Best Actress	Zaira Wasim	Nominated	
10 August 2018	Indian Film Festival of Melbourne	Best Supporting Performance (Male/Female)	Meher Vij	Nominated	

== Impact ==
Secret Superstar's strong opening in China was helped by Aamir Khan's significant following in the country, along with strong word-of-mouth, influenced by high audience ratings of 9.6 out of 10 on Maoyan and 8.2 out of 10 on Douban. The film was also trending on Chinese social media platforms, including WeChat and Douban, and dominated discussions on Sina Weibo. Along with Khan, audiences also recognised Zaira Wasim from Dangal. The film's strong opening weekend cemented Aamir Khan's status as a superstar in China, and as "a king of the Chinese box office". Aamir Khan's earnings for Secret Superstar from the China box office is estimated to be ₹190 crore (US$27.78 million), higher than what any other Indian actor-producer has ever earned from a film. The film has increased Aamir Khan's China box office total to $346.5 million (₹2,231 crore).

The film, along with previous Aamir Khan successes such as Dangal, has driven up the buyout prices of Indian film imports for Chinese distributors. The success of Dangal and Secret Superstar contributed towards Salman Khan's Bajrangi Bhaijaan (2015) securing a wide release in China, along with Irrfan Khan's Hindi Medium (2017) getting a release in the country.

As with previous Aamir Khan films such as 3 Idiots and Dangal, Secret Superstar's social themes such as feminism and domestic violence are universal issues that resonated with Chinese audiences, many of whom could relate to the film's themes. According to Maoyan, the film's audiences were about 57% female and 43% male, and the majority were in the 20–34 age group. Secret Superstar has reportedly influenced an increase in Chinese women calling police for help with domestic violence.

Secret Superstar contributed towards the Chinese market's growth in early 2018, along with domestic productions. Secret Superstar's gross dwarfed every Hollywood film released in the first two months, including Jumanji: Welcome to the Jungle, Maze Runner: The Death Cure, and Star Wars: The Last Jedi. Secret Superstar also contributed towards China setting the record for the highest-grossing month ever in any territory during February 2018, when Secret Superstar (rather than Hollywood) was the strongest foreign presence among several dominant domestic Chinese New Year productions.
