= Meher Vij =

Indian film actress

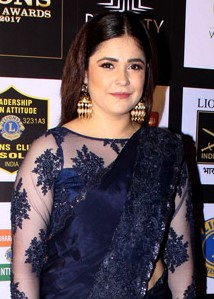
- Vij at the Lions Gold Awards in 2018
- Born: Vaishali Sahdev
- Occupation: Actress
- Years active: 2003–present
- Spouse: Manav Vij (m. 2009)
- Relatives: Piyush Sahdev (brother); Gireesh Sahdev (brother)

Meher Vij (born Vaishali Sahdev) is an Indian actress who appears in Hindi films and television. She is best known for her roles in the drama film Bajrangi Bhaijaan (2015) and the Secret Superstar (2017), both of which rank among the highest grossing Indian films of all time; for the latter she won the Filmfare Award Best Supporting Actress.

She has appeared in television shows including Kis Desh Mein Hai Meraa Dil and Ram Milaye Jodi.

== Personal life ==
Vij has two brothers, actors Piyush Sahdev and Gireesh Sahdev. In 2009, she married Manav Vij in Mumbai, after which she changed her name from Vaishali Sahdev to Meher Vij.

== Filmography ==
=== Films ===
Year	Title	Role	Notes
2003	Saaya	Nurse	Cameo appearance
2003	Yeh Hawayein	Sanobar	
2005	Lucky: No Time for Love	Padma	
2013	The Pied Piper	Shanti	
2014	Dil Vil Pyaar Vyaar	Simran	
2015	Bajrangi Bhaijaan	Razia	
2016	Ardaas	Bani	
2016	Tum Bin II	Manpreet	
2017	Secret Superstar	Najma	
2019	Ardaas Karaan	Jaago	
2020	Bhoot – Part One: The Haunted Ship	Vandana	
2022	Jahaan Chaar Yaar	Mansi	
2024	Maharaj	Vahuji	
2024	Bandaa Singh Chaudhary	Bandaa's wife	

=== Television ===
Year	Title	Role	Notes
2006	Stree Teri Kahani	Ritu	
2008–2010	Kis Desh Mein Hai Meraa Dil	Meher	
2010	Preet Se Bandhi Ye Dori Ram Milaayi Jodi	Hetal	
2013	Yeh Hai Aashiqui	Preet	Episode: Love Calling
2014	Kesariya Balam Aavo Hamare Des	Rasal	

=== Web series ===
Year	Title	Role	Notes
2020	Special OPS	Ruhaani	

== Awards and nominations ==
=== Filmfare Awards ===
Year	Nominated work	Category	Result	Ref.
2017	Secret Superstar	Best Actor in a Supporting Role (Female)	Won	

=== Star Screen Awards ===
Year	Nominated work	Category	Result	Ref.
2017	Secret Superstar	Best Actor in a Supporting Role (Female)	Won	

=== Zee Cine Awards ===
Year	Nominated work	Category	Result	Ref.
2017	Secret Superstar	Best Supporting Actress	Won	

=== IIFA Awards ===
Year	Nominated work	Category	Results	Ref.
2018	Secret Superstar	Best Supporting Actress	Won	
