= Kausar Munir =

Indian lyricist

- Born: Bandra, Mumbai, India
- Occupations: Lyricist; screenwriter
- Spouses: Nirmal Pandey (m. 1997; div. 2000); Naveen Pandita (m. 2001)
- Children: 1
- Writing career
- Years active: 2003–present

Kausar Munir (Note: Hindustani pronunciation: [kɔːsəɾ mʊniːɾ].) (Hindustani pronunciation: [kɔːsəɾ mʊniːɾ]) is an Indian lyricist and dialogue writer who works in Hindi cinema.

== Biography ==
Munir was born and brought up in Bandra, Mumbai. She graduated in English Literature from St. Xavier's College, Mumbai.

Munir married actor Nirmal Pandey in 1997. They separated and were divorced in 2000. She has been married to Naveen Pandita since 2001. They have a daughter Sophie Pandita.

Munir is granddaughter of Indian Urdu novelist Salma Siddiqui.

Munir started working in media undertaking research work. Munir started her career in television by writing for the serial Jassi Jaisi Koi Nahin. She went on to write lyrics of Falak Tak for the film Tashan, followed by songs for Ishaqzaade, Ek Tha Tiger, Dhoom 3, Bajrangi Bhaijaan, and Dear Zindagi.

She has also worked as a language consultant for the film English Vinglish. She has lyrics for Bollywood songs and is also a script writer.

The official anthem for the 2021 ICC Men's T20 World Cup, "Live the game!, Love the game!", was written by Munir with music by Amit Trivedi and vocals from Sharvi Yadav and Anand Bhaskar. She incorporated the use of "Hinglish" at intervals, with the song mostly being in English.

== Filmography ==
- 2008 Tashan (lyrics)
- 2010 Anjaana Anjaani (lyrics)
- 2012 Ishaqzaade (lyricist)
- 2012 Ek Tha Tiger (lyricist)
- 2012 Ajab Gazabb Love (lyricist)
- 2013 Nautanki Saala! (lyricist)
- 2013 Ishkq in Paris (lyricist)
- 2013 Gori Tere Pyaar Mein (lyricist)
- 2013 Bullett Raja (lyricist)
- 2013 Dhoom: 3 (lyricist)
- 2014 Jai Ho (lyricist)
- 2014 Youngistaan (lyricist)
- 2014 Main Tera Hero (lyricist)
- 2014 Heropanti (lyricist)
- 2015 Tevar (lyricist)
- 2015 Shamitabh (lyricist)
- 2015 Bajrangi Bhaijaan (lyricist and dialogue writer)
- 2015 Phantom (lyricist and dialogue writer)
- 2016 Baarish Aur Chowmein (script and lyrics)
- 2016 Love Games (lyricist)
- 2016 Raaz: Reboot (lyricist)
- 2016 Dear Zindagi (lyricist/additional writer)
- 2017 Qaidi Band (lyricist)
- 2017 Meri Pyaari Bindu (lyricist)
- 2017 Begum Jaan (Additional screenplay, Dialogues, Lyrics)
- 2017 Tubelight (Lyrics)
- 2017 Secret Superstar (lyricist)
- 2018 Pad Man (lyricist)
- 2018 3 Dev (lyricist)
- 2018 Jalebi (Writer)
- 2020 Yeh Ballet (lyricist)
- 2020 Guilty (lyricist)
- 2020 Gunjan Saxena: The Kargil Girl (lyricist)
- 2020 The Forgotten Army - Azaadi Ke Liye (lyricist)
- 2021 Shiddat (lyricist)
- 2021 Rashmi Rocket (lyricist)
- 2021 83 (lyricist)
- 2022 Gehraiyaan (lyricist)
- 2022 Rocket Boys (dialogue writer)
- 2022 Qala (lyricist)
- 2023 Mrs. Chatterjee vs Norway (lyricist)
- 2023 Jubilee (lyricist)
- 2023 8 A.M. Metro (lyricist)
- 2023 Bawaal (lyricist)
- 2023 Ghoomer (lyricist)
- 2023 Tumse Na Ho Payega (lyricist)
- 2024 Dange (lyricist)
- 2024 Mr. & Mrs. Mahi (lyricist)
- 2024 Chandu Champion (lyricist)
- 2024 Maharaj (lyricist)
- 2024 Indian 2 (lyricist)
- 2024 Devara Part 1 (lyricist) - 2 songs
- 2024 Kahan Shuru Kahan Khatam (lyricist)
- 2024 Do Patti (lyricist)
- 2025 The Diplomat (lyricist)
- 2025 Raid 2 (lyricist)
- 2025 Phule (lyricist)
- 2025 Sarzameen (lyricist)
- 2025 Sunny Sanskari Ki Tulsi Kumari (lyricist)
- 2026 Border 2 (lyricist)
- 2026 Alpha (lyricist)

== Awards ==
- Winner: G20 Women Achiever’s Award in Media 2023
- Winner: Critics Choice Award for Best Dialogue (2022) for Rocket Boys
- Winner: Laadli Award Woman Achiever in Media 2022
- Winner: Filmfare Award for Best Lyricist(2022) for Lehra Do song in the movie 83
- Winner: Nexa IIFA Best Lyricist Award(2021) for Lehra Do song in the movie 83
- Nomination: Album of The Year Mirchi Music Awards (2017) for Secret Superstar
- Nomination: Lyricist of The Year Mirchi Music Awards (2017) for "Maana Ke Hum Yaar Nahin (Duet)" from Meri Pyaari Bindu
- Nomination: Best Lyricist Filmfare Awards (2016)
- Nomination: Best Lyricist Screen Awards (2016)
- Nomination: Best Lyricist Filmfare Awards (2014)
- Nomination: Lyricist of The Year Mirchi Music Awards (2014) for "Suno Na Sangemarmar" from Youngistaan
- Nomination: Album of The Year Mirchi Music Awards (2012) for Ishaqzaade
- Winner: Best Lyricist Stardust Awards (2014)
- Winner: Best Lyricist Star Screen Awards (2014)
- Winner : Best Lyricist Zee Cine Award (2013)
- Winner : Standout Performance By Lyricist Stardust Award (2013)
- Winner : Standout Performance By Lyricist Stardust Award (2009)
