= CityLights (soundtrack) =

Soundtrack album by Jeet Gannguli
- Released: 12 May 2014
- Recorded: 2013–2014
- Genre: Feature film soundtrack
- Length: 32:18
- Language: Hindi
- Label: Sony Music India
- Producer: Mukesh Bhatt

Jeet Gannguli chronology
Youngistaan (2014)	CityLights (2014)	Singham Returns (2014)

Singles from CityLights
- 1. "Muskurane" Released: 2 May 2014

CityLights is the soundtrack album to the 2014 film of the same name directed by Hansal Mehta and produced by Mukesh Bhatt's Vishesh Films and Fox Star Studios. The soundtrack featured seven songs composed by Jeet Gannguli and lyrics written by Rashmi Singh and was released under the Sony Music India label on 12 May 2014 to positive reviews from critics. Rashmi won the Filmfare Award for Best Lyricist for the song "Muskurane" amongst other accolades.

== Development ==
Jeet Gannguli was assigned to score music for the film, after Mahesh Bhatt, the CEO of Vishesh Films, had recommended his name to Mehta. The music sittings held in late-2013, at Gannguli's house with Mukesh, Mahesh, Mehta and Gannguli being present. When the tunes were conceptualized, Gannguli recorded the songs while Rashmi wrote the lyrics simultaneously. He was recommended to compose songs that would be reminiscent of R. D. Burman and S. D. Burman's works, and the score should be sweeping for a small, offbeat film.

Mehta's experience on learning with classical musician Rashid Khan, helped him to bring Khan and Usha Uthup for recording the title song. Gannguli used Khan's aalap in the background as an extended addition. The song "Ek Charraiya" was tuned when Gannguli was asked to compose a song based on a tune that Mehta liked. The song was based on his own memories on migrating from Kolkata to Mumbai for working in Bollywood music industry. He recorded the scratch vocals which Mehta liked, and that resulted in him using it for the unplugged version and included in the film. The original version is recorded by Arijit Singh. The song "Darbadar" was recorded in a workshop with singer Neeti Mohan, and "Soney Do" was recorded over a night with vocals by Arijit Singh.

While Gannguli had finished scoring four tunes, Mukesh wanted a "great romantic melody which would create an indelible mark in the mind of the listeners for a long time to come". Gannguli then came up with a tune at midnight which his wife Chandrani complimented it as "fantastic". Then, he played the 'mukhda' of the song to Mukesh, to which the latter liked it, and the following morning, Gannguli came up with the antara and played it to Mukesh and Mehta, whom liked it. Gannguli, then sent the tune to Rashmi who wrote the lyrics in a couple of hours, eventually led to the song "Muskurane" being developed. Gannguli recorded two versions of the song with Arijit and Mohammed Irfan and recorded it within 2–3 hours.

== Release ==
The song "Muskurane" was first released in the Indian television show Beintehaa aired through Colors TV on 2 May 2014, prior to its airing on other music channels. The same day it was released as a music video and a digital single. The soundtrack was released by Sony Music India on 12 May 2014.

== Reception ==
Joginder Tuteja of Rediff.com wrote "It's obvious that the Bhatts are trying to experiment and moving away from their usual style. So it's ironical that the number that makes the biggest impression is Muskurane, which bears their signature sound." Priya Adivarekar of The Indian Express wrote "The album could have been better, but Gannguli does a fairly good job." Rajiv Vijayakar of Bollywood Hungama stated "Emotionally moving sums up this beautiful and heartfelt album. Rashmi Singh is a brilliant find with lyrics that are direct and pithy. And we wonder why melody cannot be so supple each time, and lyrics so simple, direct, unalloyed and devoid of oblique metaphors and an overdose of the wrong elements. For this alone, the music team deserves a standing ovation." Karthik Srinivasan of Milliblog described "Citylights is the best Hindi soundtrack by Jeet Ganguli yet."

== Track listing ==
No.	Title	Singer(s)	Length
1.	"Muskurane"	Arijit Singh	5:34
2.	"Darbadar"	Neeti Mohan	4:22
3.	"Ek Charraiya"	Arijit Singh	4:46
4.	"Citylights" (Title Song)	Ustad Rashid Khan, Usha Uthup	3:23
5.	"Soney Do"	Arijit Singh	4:27
6.	"Ek Charraiya" (Unplugged)	Jeet Gannguli	4:47
7.	"Muskurane" (Unplugged)	Mohammad Irfan Ali	4:59
Total length:			32:18

== Accolades ==
Award	Date of ceremony (Note: Date is linked to the article about the awards held that year, wherever possible.)	Category	Recipients	Result	Ref.
BIG Star Entertainment Awards	18 December 2014	Most Entertaining Singer (Male)	Arijit Singh – "Muskurane"	Won	
Filmfare Awards	31 January 2015	Best Lyricist	Rashmi Singh – "Muskurane"	Won	
Global Indian Music Academy Awards	24 February 2015	Best Male Playback Singer	Arijit Singh – "Muskurane"	Won	
Global Indian Music Academy Awards	24 February 2015	Best Film Album	CityLights – Jeet Gannguli and Rashmi Singh	Nominated	
Global Indian Music Academy Awards	24 February 2015	Best Engineer – Film Album	Eric Pillai	Nominated	
International Indian Film Academy Awards	5–7 June 2015	Best Lyricist	Rashmi Singh – "Muskurane"	Nominated	
International Indian Film Academy Awards	5–7 June 2015	Best Male Playback Singer	Arijit Singh – "Muskurane"	Nominated	
Mirchi Music Awards	27 February 2015	Album of the Year	CityLights – Jeet Gannguli and Rashmi Singh	Nominated	
Mirchi Music Awards	27 February 2015	Song of The Year	"Muskurane"	Nominated	
Mirchi Music Awards	27 February 2015	Song of The Year (Listener's Choice)	"Muskurane"	Won	
Mirchi Music Awards	27 February 2015	Music Composer of The Year	Jeet Gannguli – "Muskurane"	Nominated	
Mirchi Music Awards	27 February 2015	Male Vocalist of The Year	Arijit Singh – "Muskurane"	Won	
Mirchi Music Awards	27 February 2015	Lyricist of The Year	Rashmi Singh – "Muskurane"	Nominated	
Mirchi Music Awards	27 February 2015	Upcoming Lyricist of The Year	Rashmi Singh – "Muskurane"	Won	
Mirchi Music Awards	27 February 2015	Raag-Inspired Song of the Year	"Soney Do"	Won	
Star Guild Awards (Note: Also known as Apsara Film & Television Producers Guild Awards.)	12 January 2015	Best Lyricist	Rashmi Singh – "Muskurane"	Nominated	
Stardust Awards	15 December 2014	Best Lyricist	Rashmi Singh – "Muskurane"	Nominated	
Stardust Awards	15 December 2014	Best Male Playback Singer	Arijit Singh – "Muskurane"	Nominated	
Screen Awards	14 January 2015	Best Lyricist	Rashmi Singh – "Muskurane"	Nominated	
Screen Awards	14 January 2015	Best Female Playback Singer	Arijit Singh – "Muskurane"	Won	
