= Mohammed Irfan (singer) =

Indian playback singer (born 1985)

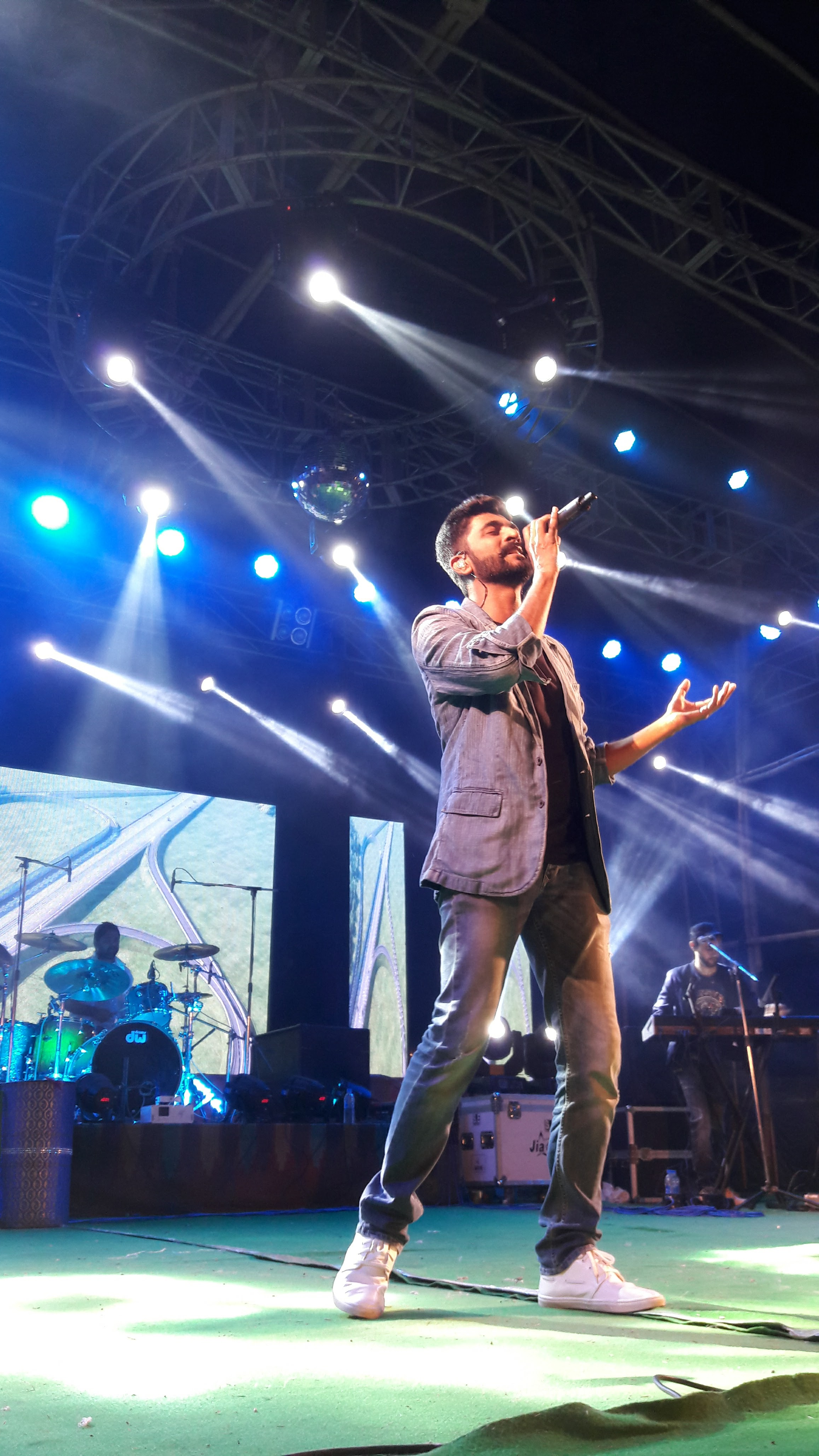
- Irfan performing at BCKV in 2017

Background information
- Born: 1 July 1985 (age 41); Hyderabad, Andhra Pradesh, India
- Origin: Hyderabad, Telangana, India
- Genres: Filmi; Pop
- Occupations: Singer; musician
- Instrument: Vocals
- Years active: 2010–2025

Mohammed Irfan (born 1 July 1985) is an Indian playback singer who sings predominantly in Hindi. He has also sung in Bengali, Tamil, Kannada, Odia, Telugu, and Marathi.

== Life and career ==
=== Early life ===
Irfan was born in Hyderabad and completed his schooling at All Saints High School, Hyderabad. His teacher Ramachari identified Irfan's talent and trained him in music. He used to come back after completing his school to perform in annual events. He won the title of Jo Jeeta Wohi Super Star 2. He was also one of the contestants of Amul STAR Voice of India, as well as Sa Re Ga Ma Pa Challenge 2005, where he was on Ismail Darbar's Yalgaar Ho Gharana.

=== Bollywood career ===
Irfan caught the attention of veteran singer S. P. Balasubrahmanyam during a concert at a musical institute in Hyderabad. Balasubramaniam recommended him to A.R. Rahman, after which Rahman asked Irfan to provide background vocals for the Mani Ratnam-directed 2010 film Raavan. Irfan recorded the song "Behene De" for the film alongside Karthik. The track, which topped music charts for many continuous weeks, also received rave critical reviews. The same year, he recorded two songs for Mithoon's Lamhaa, titled "Salaam Zindagi" and "Rehmat Zara", where for the latter he received the best male singer debut award.

Irfan performed "Phir Mohabbat" along with Arijit Singh and Saim Bhat in the Mukesh Bhatt-produced 2011 film Murder 2. The song was commercially successful and received radio airplay. He collaborated with the music directors Sajid–Wajid, Himesh Reshammiya, Meet Bros Anjjan, Jeet Ganguly.

His song ‘Dil Sambhal Ja Zara’ in film ‘Murder 2’ that made him establish himself as a singer.

In 2014 his songs included "Baarish" from Yaariyan, "Muskurane" from Citylights, "Banjaara" from Ek Villain, "Dard Dilo Ke" from The Xpose and "Tu Hi Tu" from Kick. The song "Banjaara", composed and written by Mithoon Sharma, was commercially successful. Reviewing the song, Rediff.com wrote Irfan "is another singer making an impression in the Bollywood musical arena, and is sure to be noticed with this number".

== Discography ==
=== Hindi songs ===
Year	Film	Song	Composer(s)	Writer(s)	Co-singer(s)	Ref.
2010	Raavan	"Behene De"	A.R. Rahman	Gulzar	Karthik	
2010	Lamhaa	"Rehmat Zara"	Mithoon	Sayeed Quadri, Mithoon	Mithoon	
2010	Lamhaa	"Salaam Zindagi"	Mithoon	Sayeed Quadri	Arun Daga	
2011	Murder 2	"Phir Mohabbat"	Mithoon	Sayeed Quadri	Arijit Singh, Saim Bhat	
2012	Ajab Gazabb Love	"Sun Soniye"	Sajid–Wajid	Kausar Munir	Antara Mitra	
2012	Ajab Gazabb Love	"Sun Soniye" (Remix Version)	Sajid–Wajid	Kausar Munir	Antara Mitra	
2012	OMG: Oh My God!	"Tu Hi Tu"	Himesh Reshammiya	Sameer		
2012	OMG: Oh My God!	"Tu Hi Tu" (Remix Version)	Himesh Reshammiya	Sameer		
2013	Ishk Actually	"Tum Jo Mile Ishq Me"	Shahdaab Bhartiya	Sanjay Mishra	Chandreyee Bhattacharya	
2013	Ishk Actually	"Tum Jo Mile Ishq Me" (Male Version)	Shahdaab Bhartiya	Sanjay Mishra		
2013	Satya 2	"Veerani"	Sanjeev-Darshan	Kumaar	Payel Aditiya Dev	
2014	Yaariyan	"Baarish"	Mithoon			
2014	Yaariyan	"Baarish" (Remix Version)	Mithoon			
2014	The Xpose	"Dard Dilo Ke"	Himesh Reshammiya	Sameer		
2014	The Xpose	"Dard Dilo Ke" (Remix Version)	Himesh Reshammiya	Sameer	Neeti Mohan	
2014	The Xpose	"Dard Dilo Ke" (Reprise Version)	Himesh Reshammiya	Sameer	Neeti Mohan	
2014	Angry Young Man	"Tere Bin Jiya"	Amjad-Nadeem	Ankur Tewari, Shabbir Ahmed	Shivranjani Singh	
2014	Citylights	"Muskurane" (Unplugged Version)	Jeet Ganguly	Rashmi Singh		
2014	Unforgettable	"Abhi Se Teri" (Version 1)	Sachin Gupta			
2014	Ek Villain	"Banjaara"	Mithoon			
2014	Kick	"Tu Hi Tu" (Version 1)	Himesh Reshammiya	Mayur Puri		
2014	Kick	"Tu Hi Tu" (Version 1 Remix)	Himesh Reshammiya	Mayur Puri		
2014	Kick	"Hai Yehi Zindagi"	Meet Bros Anjjan	Kumaar		
2014	Spark	"Khwabo Mein Dekhi Thi Jo Angadayeenyan"	R.K. Dhiman	Malvinder Jeet, K P Singh	Yashita Sharma	
2015	Luckhnowi Ishq	"Tu Aaina Hai Mera"	Raaj Aashoo	Neeraj Gupta		
2015	Monsoon	"Thoda Sa"	Biswajit Bhatacharjee			
2015	Ranbanka	"Kahna Re"				
2015	Bumper Draw	"Lukkhe Bade Aate Hain"	Rahul Mishra	Irshad Khan		
2015	Barkhaa	"Lafze Bayaan"	Amjad – Nadeem		Shreya Ghoshal	
2015	Thoda Lutf Thoda Ishq	"Pyar Hua Jab Tumse"				
2015	Uvaa	"Ishq Fobia"	Rashid Khan	Bhupendra Singh	Bhanu Pratap	
2015	Brothers	"Gaaye Jaa"	Ajay–Atul	Amitabh Bhattacharya	Shreya Ghoshal	
2015	Prem Ratan Dhan Payo	"Jab Tum Chaho"	Himesh Reshammiya	Irshad Kamil	Palak Muchhal, Darshan Raval	
2015	Ishq Ne Krazy Kiya Re	"Tu Dua Hai Dua"	Rishi Siddharth	Ravi Basnet		
2016	Shaukeen Kaminay	"Maahi Re"	Dharam Dewda			
2017	Who is the first wife of my father	"Mere Khuda"				
2017	Flat 211	"Tere Lams Ne"	Prakash Prabhakar	Tanveer Ghazi		
2017	Jab Harry Met Sejal	"Yaadon Mein"	Pritam	Irshad Kamil	Jonita Gandhi, Cuca Roseta, Arjun Chandy	
2018	Nanu Ki Jaanu	"Tujhe Dekhte Hi Nazar"	Gunwant Sen	Abid Ali		
2019	Rangeela Raja	"Jagmag Jagamag"	Iswar Kumaar	Mehboob	Shreya Ghoshal	
2019	Risknamaa	"Maine Pyaar Kyo kiya"	Dushant	Sanjeet Nirmal		
2019	Mushkil	"Ek Siwa Tere"	Vardan Singh	Anjaan Sagri		
2020	Bebaakee	"Aakhri Baar"	Darshan-Umang	Rashmi Virag	Palak Muchhal	Web series
2021	Tadap	"Tere Siva Jag Mein (Reprise)"	Pritam	Irshad Kamil, Shloke Laal	Asees Kaur	
2022	Himesh Ke Dil Se	"Dard E Dil Kii Dawwa"	Himesh Reshammiya	Himesh Reshammiya	Arpita Mukherjee	Album
2022	Himesh Ke Dil Se	"Terri Aashiqui Ne Maarraa"	Himesh Reshammiya	Shabbir Ahmed		Album
2024	Chandu Champion	"Sarphira (Climax Version)"	Pritam	Kausar Munir		

=== Other languages ===
Year	Film/Album	Song	Language	Composer(s)	Writer(s)	Co-singer(s)	Ref.
2012	Muppozhudhum Un Karpanaigal	"Yaar Aval Yaaro"	Tamil	G. V. Prakash Kumar	Thamarai		
2012	Dil Jaani	"Re Mana"	Odia	Abhijit Majumdar	—N/a		
2013	Break Up	"Vadhili Polene"	Telugu	Indus Gharana	Krishna Chinni		
2014	Ami Shudhu Cheyechi Tomay	"Ami Shudhu Cheyechi Tomay"	Bengali	Savvy	Saurav Bhadra		
2014	Kokhon Tomar Asbe Telephone	"Tumio Ki Anmona" (Sad Version)	Bengali	Dabbu	Prasen (Prasenjit Mukherjee)	Aditi Paul	
2015	Shortcut	"Maula"	Marathi	Puneet Dixit	Puneet Dixit		
2015	Agnee 2	"Baanjara"	Bengali	Akaash	Priyo Chatterjee		
2015	Aashiqui	"Ei Aashiqui"	Bengali	Savvy		Akriti Kakar	
2016	Angaar	"Kotobaar Bojhabo Bol"	Bengali	Akassh	Priyo Chatterjee		
2016	Hero 420	"Ore Priya"	Bengali	Savvy Gupta	Prasen (Prasenjit Mukherjee)		
2016	Niyoti	"Toke Chara"	Bengali	Savvy Gupta	Priyo Chatterjee		
2016	Mental	"Ureche Dhulo"	Bengali	Dabbu	Prasen (Prasenjit Mukherjee)		
2016	Rokto	"Jante Jodi Chao"	Bengali	Akaash			
2016	Janaki Ramudu	"O Prema"	Telugu	Gifton Elias	Shreemani		
2016	Santheyalli Nintha Kabira	"Maneyembodu"	Kannada	Ismail Darbar	Gopala Vajpayee	Anweshaa	
2016	God Father (2016 film)	"Saloni Saloni""	Odia	Abhijit Majumdar	Nizam	Tapu Mishra	
2017	Rangbaz	"Rimjhim"	Bengali	Dabbu	Prasen (Prasenjit Mukherjee)	Antara Mitra	
2018	Sultan: The Saviour	"Aamar Mon"	Bengali	Savvy Gupta	Priyo Chatterjee		
2020	Asur	"Tor Hoye Jete Chai"	Bengali	Bickram Ghosh	Sugato Guha		

== Accolades ==
Year	Award Ceremony	Category	Film	Song	Result	Reference(s)
2010	Mirchi Music Awards	Upcoming Male Vocalist of The Year	Lamhaa	"Salaam Zindagi"	Won	
