= Ishaqzaade (soundtrack) =

Soundtrack album by Amit Trivedi
- Released: 13 April 2012
- Recorded: 2011–2012
- Studio: YRF Studios, Mumbai
- Genre: Feature film soundtrack
- Length: 36:21
- Language: Hindi
- Label: YRF Music
- Producer: Aditya Chopra

Amit Trivedi chronology
Ek Main Aur Ekk Tu (2012)	Ishaqzaade (2012)	English Vinglish (2012)

Ishaqzaade is the soundtrack album to the 2012 film of the same name directed by Habib Faisal and produced by Aditya Chopra of Yash Raj Films, starring Arjun Kapoor and Parineeti Chopra in their film debuts. The music of the film is composed by Amit Trivedi and lyrics were written by Kausar Munir and one song by Faisal himself. The album consisted of five original songs, two remixes and mashup of the earlier seven songs. The soundtrack was released under the YRF Music label on 13 April 2012.

== Development ==
The soundtrack for the film featured music composed by Amit Trivedi, in his first collaboration with Yash Raj Films. In an interview, Trivedi stated that he had "lot of fun creating music for this album", while collaborating with several talented singers such as Javed Ali, Shreya Ghoshal, Vishal Dadlani and Sunidhi Chauhan, was an "amazing experience". He was tasked to create an album that would have both romantic and party numbers. As a result, the soundtrack accompanied electronic music, EDM and dubstep with melodic numbers. Two songs "Pareshaan" and "Jhallah Wallah" were remixed by Abhijit Vaghani, while a mashup of all the tracks were produced by Sunny Subramanian. The background score was composed by Ranjit Barot.

== Track listing ==
No.	Title	Lyrics	Artist(s)	Length
1.	"Ishaqzaade"	Kausar Munir	Javed Ali, Shreya Ghoshal	5:16
2.	"Chokra Jawaan"	Habib Faisal	Vishal Dadlani, Sunidhi Chauhan	5:10
3.	"Pareshaan"	Kausar Munir	Shalmali Kholgade	4:52
4.	"Jhallah Wallah"	Kausar Munir	Shreya Ghoshal	5:51
5.	"Aafaton Ke Parinde"	Kausar Munir	Divya Kumar, Suraj Jagan	3:23
6.	"Pareshaan" (Remix)	Kausar Munir	Shalmali Kholgade, Abhijit Vaghani	4:29
7.	"Jhallah Wallah" (Remix)	Kausar Munir	Shreya Ghoshal, Abhijit Vaghani	4:00
8.	"Ishaqzaade" (Mashup)	Kausar Munir, Habib Faisal	Sunny Subramanian	3:18
Total length:				36:21

== Reception ==
Dipti Nagpaul D'Souza in her review for The Indian Express praised "Trivedi once again seamlessly blends the contemporary sound with desi beats", further adding "Much of the album's strength also lies in the lyrics. Munir has aptly captured the setting through expressions without compromising on the emotions they are meant to narrate. However, it somehow does not engage the listener at an album level, perhaps for the lack of a unifying thread." Joginder Tuteja of Bollywood Hungama gave the album 7/10, saying that "Amit Trivedi comes up with yet another fantastic score and breaks the existing norms while further consolidating his own identity into the musical scene. Doing consistently well over the years, he hits the right notes with Ishaqzaade as well where the most significant aspect of his compositions is the fact that it bears his stamp more than anyone else. With Kausar Munir's lyrics further setting the stage for him, he comes up with a soundtrack which may surprise listeners to begin with (due to its unusual flavour) but should eventually find acceptance in due course of time."

A reviewer from The Times of India gave the album 3 out of 5 stars, commenting that the album "may not have too much on the platter with just 5 original tracks but it still manages to strike a chord with the listener. The album is definitely worth a shot." Anand Holla of Mumbai Mirror wrote "With Ishaqzaade, Trivedi reasserts his genius and proves that consistent brilliance is a regular trait of true talent." Gaurav Sharma of Hindustan Times wrote "On first listen, the Ishaqzaade album may not grab you by the ears, but give it a chance to grow on you, and it will." Devesh Sharma of Filmfare noted it as a "gritty, no-holds-barred album [and] a listeners delight from the word go". Karthik Srinivasan of Milliblog stated "After his recent low, Amit Trivedi is back, all guns blazing".

In her blog for the same publication, Richa Bhatia praised the soundtrack's use of dubstep, a genre of electronic dance music, along with the "punchy" lyrics, "chutney and dash." Film composer Anu Malik also praised the soundtrack, stating that "it is the first time I have observed dubstep in a film and it's incredible." Vipin Nair in his blog for Film Companion listed Ishaqzaade at number 80 on 100 Bollywood albums of all time.

== Awards and nominations ==
Ceremony	Category	Recipient	Result	Ref.
Apsara Film & Television Producers Guild Awards	Best Female Playback Singer	Shalmali Kholgade – ("Pareshaan")	Nominated	
Filmfare Awards	Best Music Director	Amit Trivedi	Nominated	
Filmfare Awards	Best Female Playback Singer	Shalmali Kholgade – ("Pareshaan")	Nominated	
Mirchi Music Awards	Album of the Year	Ishaqzaade	Nominated	
Mirchi Music Awards	Female Vocalist of the Year	Shalmali Kholgade – ("Pareshaan")	Nominated	
Mirchi Music Awards	Upcoming Female Vocalist of the Year	Shalmali Kholgade – ("Pareshaan")	Nominated	
Mirchi Music Awards	Upcoming Lyricist of The Year	Habib Faisal – ("Chokra Jawaan")	Nominated	
Mirchi Music Awards	Song Recording/Sound Engineering of the Year	Dipesh Sharma, Vijay Dayal, Karan Kulkarni and Alok Punjani – ("Pareshaan")	Nominated	
Screen Awards	Best Music Director	Amit Trivedi	Nominated	
Screen Awards	Best Male Playback Singer	Javed Ali – ("Ishaqzaade")	Nominated	
Screen Awards	Best Female Playback Singer	Shalmali Kholgade – ("Pareshaan")	Nominated	
Stardust Awards	Standout Performance by a Lyricist	Kausar Munir – ("Ishaqzaade")	Nominated	
Stardust Awards	New Musical Sensation Singer – Female	Shalmali Kholgade – ("Pareshaan")	Nominated	
The Times of India Film Awards	Best Female Playback Singer	Shalmali Kholgade – ("Pareshaan")	Nominated	
Zee Cine Awards	Best Music Director	Amit Trivedi	Nominated	
Zee Cine Awards	Best Lyricist	Kausar Munir – ("Pareshaan")	Won	
Zee Cine Awards	Best Playback Singer – Male	Javed Ali – ("Ishaqzaade")	Nominated	
Zee Cine Awards	Best Playback Singer – Female	Shalmali Kholgade – ("Pareshaan")	Nominated	
Zee Cine Awards	Sa Re Ga Ma Pa Fresh Singing Talent	Shalmali Kholgade – ("Pareshaan")	Won	
