= 7th Mirchi Music Awards =

Hindi music award ceremony

- Sponsored by: Royal Stag
- Date: February 26, 2015
- Location: Yash Raj Studios, Mumbai
- Country: India
- Presented by: Radio Mirchi
- Hosted by: Aditya Narayan & Karishma Tanna

Highlights
- Most awards: CityLights (3)
- Most nominations: Ek Villain (8)
- Song of the Year: "Zehnaseeb" - Hasee Toh Phasee
- Album of the Year: 2 States
- Website: Music Mirchi Awards 2014

Television/radio coverage
- Network: Zee TV

The 7th Mirchi Music Awards, presented by the Radio Mirchi, honoured the best of Hindi music from the year 2014. The ceremony was held on 26 February 2015 at the Yash Raj Studios, Mumbai and was hosted by Aditya Narayan and Karishma Tanna. There were many performances, including those by Palak Muchhal, Usha Uthup, Benny Dayal, Shankar Mahadevan and Shruti Pathak. CityLights won a leading three awards. 2 States was awarded the Album of the Year, while "Zehnaseeb" from Hasee Toh Phasee won Song of the Year award. The show was broadcast on 22 March 2015 on Zee TV.

== Winners and nominees ==
The winners were selected by the members of jury, chaired by Javed Akhtar. The following are the names of nominees and winners.

(Winners are listed first, highlighted in boldface.)

=== Film awards ===
Song of the Year	Album of the Year
**"Zehnaseeb"** - **Hasee Toh Phasee**; "Muskurane" - CityLights; "Galliyan" - Ek Villain; "Manwa Laage" - Happy New Year; "London Thumakda" - Queen	**"2 States"** - **Shankar–Ehsaan–Loy, Amitabh Bhattacharya**; "CityLights" - Jeet Gannguli, Rashmi Singh; "Ek Villain" - Mithoon, Ankit Tiwari, Rabbi Ahmad, Adnaan Dhool, Manoj Muntashir; "Gunday" - Sohail Sen, Irshad Kamil, Ali Abbas Zafar, Bappi Lahiri, Gautam Susmit; "Queen" - Amit Trivedi, Anvita Dutt Guptan, Verma Malik, Raghu Nath
Male Vocalist of the Year	Female Vocalist of the Year
**Arijit Singh - "Samjhawan"** from **Humpty Sharma Ki Dulhania**; Ankit Tiwari - "Galliyan" from Ek Villain; Arijit Singh - "Muskurane" from City Lights; Arijit Singh - "Manwa Laage" from Happy New Year; Vishal Dadlani - "Tu Meri" from Bang Bang!	**Nooran Sisters - "Patakha Guddi"** from **Highway**; Chinmayi Sripada - "Zehnaseeb" from Hasee Toh Phasee; Kanika Kapoor - "Baby Doll" from Ragini MMS 2; Shreya Ghoshal - "Samjhawan" from Humpty Sharma Ki Dulhania; Shreya Ghoshal - "Manwa Laage" from Happy New Year
Music Composer of the Year	Lyricist of the Year
**Shankar–Ehsaan–Loy - "Mast Magan"** from **2 States**; Ankit Tiwari - "Galliyan" from Ek Villain; Jeet Gannguli - "Muskurane" from CityLights; Vishal Bhardwaj - "Bismil" from Haider; Vishal–Shekhar - "Manwa Laage" from Happy New Year	**Irshad Kamil - "Manwa Laage"** from **Happy New Year**; Gulzar - "Bismil" from Haider; Kausar Munir - "Suno Na Sangemarmar" from Youngistaan; Manoj Muntashir - "Galliyan" from Ek Villain; Rashmi Singh - "Muskurane" from CityLights
Upcoming Male Vocalist of the Year	Upcoming Female Vocalist of the Year
**Gulraj Singh - "Pakeezah"** from **Ungli**; Armaan Malik - "Naina" from Khoobsurat; Khurram Iqbal - "Ishq Khuda" from Heartless; Rupesh Kumar Ram - "Ranjha" from Queen; Shadab Faridi - "Jashn-E-Ishqa" from Gunday	**Nooran Sisters - "Patakha Guddi"** from **Highway**; Jasmine Sandlas - "Yaar Naa Miley" from Kick; Kanika Kapoor - "Baby Doll" from Ragini MMS 2; Shraddha Kapoor - "Galliyan (Unplugged)" from Ek Villain; Shraddha Kapoor - "Do Jahaan" from Haider
Upcoming Music Composer of The Year	Upcoming Lyricist of The Year
**Raj-Prakash - "Arziyaan"** from **Jigariyaa**; Gulraj Singh - "Pakeezah" from Ungli; Rabbi Ahmad & Adnan Dhool (Soch) - "Awari" from Ek Villain; Shashi Suman - "Ziddi Dil" from Mary Kom; Shivam Pathak - "Sukoon Mila" from Mary Kom	**Rashmi Singh - "Muskurane** from **CityLights**; Faraaz Ahmed - "Arziyaan" from Jigariyaa; Manoj Yadav - "Pakeezah" from Ungli; Rabbi Ahmad & Adnan Dhool (Soch) - "Awari" from Ek Villain; Raghu Nath - "Ranjha (Queen)" from Queen
Song representing Sufi tradition	Raag-Inspired Song of the Year
**"Shana Waleya"** - **Dekh Tamasha Dekh**; "Mast Magan" - 2 States; "Allah Teri Kya Shaan Hai" - 18.11 - A Code of Secrecy; "Mann Kunto Maula" - Gunday; "Samjhawan" - Humpty Sharma Ki Dulhania; "Daata Di Diwani (Qawwali)" - Youngistaan	**"Soney Do"** - **CityLights**; "Aayi Bahaar" - Ankhon Dekhi; "Uhe Batiyaan" - Babloo Happy Hai; "Aankhiyaan" - Gulaab Gang; "Jhelum" - Haider

=== Technical awards ===
Best Song Producer (Programming & Arranging)	Best Song Engineer (Recording & Mixing)
**Bharat Goel and Meet Bros Anjjan - "Baby Doll"** from **Ragini MMS 2**; Abhijit Nalani and Zoheb Khan - "Bang Bang" from Bang Bang!; Sohail Sen - "Tune Maari Entriyaan" from Gunday; Jackie V - "Manwa Laage" from Happy New Year; Amit Trivedi and Sourav Roy - "London Thumakda" from Queen	**Satchith Harve and Praveen Muralidhar - "Manwa Laage"** from **Happy New Year**; Shakeel Ahmed, Vijay Dayal and Dipesh Sharma - "Mannat" from Daawat-e-Ishq; Vijay Dayal and Dipesh Sharma - "Tune Maari Entriyaan" from Gunday; Gautam Chakraborty, Uddipan Sharma and Eric Pillai - "Baby Doll" from Ragini MMS 2; Aditya Chakravarty and Abhishek Ghatak - "Tu Zaroori" from Zid
Best Background Score
**Vishal Bhardwaj - Haider**; A. R. Rahman - Highway; Mathias Duplessy - Finding Fanny; Sanjay Wandrekar and Atul Raninga - PK; Tubby-Parik - 2 States

=== Non-film awards ===
Indie Pop Song of the Year
- **"Desi Kalakaar"** sung by **Yo Yo Honey Singh**
  - "Bas Is Pal Mein" sung by Armaan Malik
  - "Chulein Aasman" sung by Farhan Akhtar, Salim–Sulaiman
  - "Saiyyan Bina" sung by Sonu Nigam, Bickram Ghosh
  - "Aaj Rang Hai" sung by Kavita Seth

=== Special awards ===
Lifetime Achievement Award	Javed Akhtar
Royal Stag Make It Large Award	Alia Bhatt
Diva of Dancing Hits	Madhuri Dixit

=== Listeners' Choice awards ===
Listeners' Choice Song of the Year	"Muskurane" - CityLights
Listeners' Choice Album of the Year	Ek Villain

=== Jury awards ===
Outstanding Contribution to Hindi Film Music	Burjor Lord
Best Album of Golden Era (1954)	Aar Paar
Special Salute	Raamlaxman

=== Films with multiple wins and nominations ===
Films that received multiple nominations
Nominations	Film
8	Ek Villain
7	CityLights
7	Happy New Year
5	Gunday
5	Haider
5	Queen
4	2 States
4	Ragini MMS 2
3	Highway
3	Humpty Sharma Ki Dulhania
3	Ungli
2	Bang Bang!
2	Hasee Toh Phasee
2	Jigariyaa
2	Mary Kom
2	Youngistaan

Films that received multiple awards
Wins	Film
3	CityLights‡
2	2 States
2	Happy New Year
2	Highway

‡ Won a Listeners' Choice award

== Jury ==
The jury was chaired by Javed Akhtar. Other members were:

- Aadesh Shrivastava - music composer and singer
- Alka Yagnik - playback singer
- Milind Srivastava - music director
- Anu Malik - music director
- Anuradha Paudwal - playback singer
- Anurag Basu - director, producer and screenwriter
- Bappi Lahiri - composer and singer
- Hariharan - singer
- Himesh Reshammiya - music director and singer
- Ila Arun - actress and folk singer
- Irshad Kamil - lyricist
- Lalit Pandit - composer
- Kavita Krishnamurthy - playback singer
- Louis Banks - composer, record producer and singer
- Madhur Bhandarkar - director, writer and producer
- Pankaj Udhas - singer
- Prasoon Joshi - lyricist and screenwriter
- Pritam - music director and composer
- Ramesh Sippy - director and producer
- Roop Kumar Rathod - playback singer and music director
- Sadhana Sargam - playback singer
- Sulemaan - composer
- Sameer - lyricist
- Sapna Mukherjee - playback singer
- Shailendra Singh - playback singer
- Shankar Mahadevan - composer and playback singer
- Sooraj Barjatya - director, producer and screenwriter
- Subhash Ghai - director, producer and screenwriter
- Sudhir Mishra - director and screenwriter
- Suresh Wadkar - playback singer
- Swanand Kirkire - lyricist
- Talat Aziz - singer
- Udit Narayan - playback singer

== See also ==
- Mirchi Music Awards
