= Rashmi Singh =

- Born: India
- Occupation: Lyricist

Rashmi Singh is an Indian lyricist. She received recognition for writing the lyrics of the song "Muskurane". She was awarded the "Best Lyricist" award for the song at the Filmfare awards thus becoming the first female lyricist to get the award. She was subsequently nominated in the category of the "Lyricist of the year in 2015" for her lyrics writing work in CityLights by the Mirchi Music Awards.

== Career ==
Apart from writing her own individual lyrics, she is also a member of lyrics writing duo Rashmi Virag.

== Awards and nominations ==
Year	Category	Nominated Song	Film	Result	Ref(s)
Mirchi Music Awards
2014	Album of The Year	-	CityLights	Nominated	
2014	Lyricist of The Year	"Muskurane"	CityLights	Nominated	
2014	Upcoming Lyricist of The Year	"Muskurane"	CityLights	Won	
