= GiMA Award for Best Male Playback Singer =

The GiMA Best Male Playback Singer Award is given by Global Indian Music Academy as a part of its annual Global Indian Music Academy Awards for Hindi films, to recognise a male playback singer who has delivered an outstanding performance in a film song.

== Superlatives ==
Superlative	Singer	Record
Most awards	Mohit Chauhan, Arijit Singh	2
Most nominations	Arijit Singh	7
Most nominations without ever winning	Ankit Tiwari	2
Most nominations in a single year	Mohit Chauhan	3 (2012)
	Arijit Singh	3 (2016)

== List of winners ==
- 2010 Shaan, Shantanu Moitra for "Behti Hawa Sa Tha Woh" – 3 Idiots
- 2011 Mohit Chauhan for "Pee Loon" – Once Upon A Time In Mumbaai
  - KK for "Zindagi Do Pal Ki " – Kites
  - Mohit Chauhan, Shekhar Ravjiani for "Tujhe Bhula Diya" – Anjaana Anjaani
  - Rahat Fateh Ali Khan for "Tere Mast Mast Do Nain" – Dabangg
  - Shafqat Amanat Ali for "Bin Tere" – I Hate Luv Storys
- 2012 Mohit Chauhan, A. R. Rahman for "Nadaan Parindey" – Rockstar
  - Akon for "Chammak Challo" – Ra.One
  - A. R. Rahman, Javed Ali, Mohit Chauhan for "Kun Faya Kun" – Rockstar
  - Mika Singh for "Subha Hone Na De" – Desi Boyz
  - Mohit Chauhan for "Sadda Haq" – Rockstar
- 2013 – No award given
- 2014 Arijit Singh for "Tum Hi Ho" – Aashiqui 2
  - Ankit Tiwari for "Sunn Raha Hai" – Aashiqui 2
  - Arijit Singh for "Laal Ishq" – Goliyon Ki Raasleela Ram-Leela
  - Benny Dayal for "Badtameez Dil" – Yeh Jawaani Hai Deewani
  - Tochi Raina for "Kabira" – Yeh Jawaani Hai Deewani
- 2015 Arijit Singh for "Muskurane" – CityLights
  - Ankit Tiwari for "Galliyan" – Ek Villain
  - Armaan Malik for "Auliya" – Ungli
  - Arijit Singh for "Suno Na Sangemarmar" – Youngistaan
  - Labh Janjua for "London Thumakda" – Queen
  - Sukhwinder Singh for "Bismil" – Haider
- 2016 Papon for "Moh Moh Ke Dhage" – Dum Laga Ke Haisha
  - Arijit Singh for "Aayat" – Bajirao Mastani
  - Arijit Singh for "Khamoshiyan" – Khamoshiyan
  - Mohit Chauhan for "Matargashti" – Tamasha
  - Arijit Singh for "Sooraj Dooba Hain" – Roy

== See also ==
- Bollywood
- Cinema of India
