= Mr. X (2015 film) =

2015 Indian film directed by Vikram Bhatt

- Theatrical release poster
- Directed by: Vikram Bhatt
- Written by: Vikram Bhatt; Shagufta Rafique
- Produced by: Mukesh Bhatt; Mahesh Bhatt; Tanmay Bhat
- Starring: Emraan Hashmi; Amyra Dastur; Arunoday Singh; Tanmay Bhat
- Cinematography: Pravin Bhatt
- Edited by: Kuldip Mehan
- Music by: Songs: Jeet Gannguli; Ankit Tiwari; Background Score: Raju Singh
- Production company: Vishesh Films
- Distributed by: Fox Star Studios
- Release date: 17 April 2015
- Running time: 133 minutes
- Country: India
- Language: Hindi
- Budget: ₹370 million
- Box office: ₹300 million

Mr. X is a 2015 Indian Hindi-language science fiction action film directed by Vikram Bhatt and co-produced by Mukesh Bhatt and Tanmay Bhat. The film stars Emraan Hashmi and Amyra Dastur. Its title is taken from the 1964 film Mr. X in Bombay. It follows a former ATS officer who sets out for revenge after he is framed for murder, left for dead, and gains the ability to become invisible.

Mr. X was released on 17 April 2015 in 2D and 3D versions to negative reviews from critics.

== Plot ==
Raghuram Rathod / Mr. X (Emraan Hashmi) and Siya Verma are lovers and ATS officers who lead a happy life despite many dangers. On the day before their marriage, Raghu and Siya are summoned by Aditya Bharadwaj, who assigns them to protect CM Dwarakanath Dutta as someone is plotting to kill Aditya Dutta. It is revealed that ACP Aditya Bharadwaj (Arunoday Singh) and Bharadwaj is the one who plotted to kill Dutta. Aditya Bharadwaj secretly blackmails Raghu to murder Dutta in exchange for saving Siya, who is on duty at another location.

Left with no choice, Raghu murders Dutta upon a confrontation from the latter's son Aditya, who is revealed to be the mastermind. Raghu tries to flee, but gets cornered by Bharadwaj and his man Tiwari. The three take Raghu to a rundown factory and kill him. However, Raghu survives and is charred completely, where he reaches out to his friend Popo in that condition. Popo's sister, who works at a lab, explains to them that there is a severe case of radiation and there is no cure for it. Raghu swallows an untested potion which could help alleviate some of the radiation's effects, but this causes a complete cell regeneration, which causes him to become invisible in all lights except blue light and direct sun light. Meanwhile, Siya, unaware of her life being at stake during the process, believes that Raghu killed Dutta and begins to hate him, where she plunges into work to avoid feeling the pain of heartbreak.

Raghu regains his composure, where he sets out to kill those who landed him into this situation. The first on his target is Tiwari. After a drunken night when Tiwari is driving home, Raghu finds him and tells that he will kill him in 24 hours. A panicked Tiwari narrates this to his colleagues, who don't take him seriously. Raghu kills Tiwari and Siya discovers Raghu, where she tries to tap him via Popo, but Raghu escapes from Siya's arrest. Raghu's next target is Aditya Dutta, whose security is entrusted on Siya. After a long battle with Siya, Raghu manages to kill him, but Siya is not willing to back down.

When senior authorities give the responsibility of shooting down Mr. X in an encounter, Siya backs out from the plan. Raghu gets drawn towards her love and the two spend some special days with each other. The duo goes for lunch to a quiet place, where Raghu realizes it is a police trap and gets arrested. Raghu is taken to a dilapidated place by Bharadwaj, who wants to make sure that Raghu is dead. Popo, who attempts a suicide after being attacked by Aditya Bharadwaj, tells Siya that Bharadwaj had hatched a plan to kill Raghu.

Siya goes to the place where Raghu and Bharadwaaj engage in a duel, and urges Raghu to leave Bharadwaj. She and her briefly estranged father Devraj later trick Bharadwaj into a nerving confession recorded on camera by Devraj and expose him at a press conference. Bharadwaj tries to kill Siya, but Raghu kills him. Siya reunites with Raghu despite his condition.

== Cast ==
- Emraan Hashmi as Raghuram Rathod / Mr. X
- Amyra Dastur as Siya Verma
- Arunoday Singh as ACP Aditya Bharadwaj
- Bikramjeet Kanwarpal as Ex-Encounter Cop Devraj Verma, Siya's Father
- Tanmay Bhat as Popo
- Siddhant Ghegadmal as Harun
- Girish Pardesi as Aditya Dutta
- Akash as Employee
- Shruti Ulfat as Popo's sister (special appearance)
- Gurmeet Choudhary in a special appearance in the song "Alif Se"
- Nora Fatehi in a special appearance in the song "Alif Se"
- Sushil Pandey as Tiwari

== Production ==
In October 2013, it was announced that Hashmi and Dastur would star in the upcoming 3D thriller directed by Vikram Bhatt, slated for a 17 April 2015 release. The trailer was released on 5 March 2015. Music by Ankit Tiwari and Jeet Ganguly.

As part of film promotion, Hashmi appeared in a special episode of CID on Sony Entertainment Television. Hashmi and Dastur were seen on popular youth show Kaisi Yeh Yaariyan as part of their promotion.

=== Filming ===
The principal photography of the film, began on 16 February 2014.

== Soundtrack ==
Mr. X

Soundtrack album by: Jeet Gannguli; Ankit Tiwari
- Released: 27 March 2015
- Genre: Feature film soundtrack
- Length: 29:39
- Label: Sony Music India

Singles from Mr. X
- 1. "Tu Jo Hain" Released: 16 March 2015; 2. "Mr. X (Title Song)" Released: 19 March 2015

The soundtrack of the album is composed by Jeet Gannguli and Ankit Tiwari, with lyrics penned by Rashmi Singh, Monish Raza, Abhendra Kumar and Manoj Muntashir. Singers Arijit Singh and Ankit Tiwari have lent their voice and filmmaker Mahesh Bhatt makes his debut as a playback singer in the film. The first single "Tu Jo Hain" was released on 16 March 2015.

No.	Title	Lyrics	Music	Singers	Length
1.	"Teri Khushboo (Male)"	Rashmi Singh	Jeet Gannguli	Arijit Singh	5:42
2.	"Tu Jo Hain"	Monish Raza	Ankit Tiwari	Ankit Tiwari	4:55
3.	"Mr. X (Title Song)"	Rashmi Singh	Jeet Gannguli	Mahesh Bhatt, Mili Nair	3:36
4.	"Teri Khushboo (Female)"	Rashmi Singh	Jeet Gannguli	Palak Muchhal	5:42
5.	"Saad Shukraana"	Manoj Muntashir	Ankit Tiwari	Ankit Tiwari	5:05
6.	"Alif Se"	Abhendra Kumar Upadhyay	Ankit Tiwari	Ankit Tiwari, Neeti Mohan	4:37
Total length:					29:39

== Reception ==
Bollywood Hungama gave it 2.5 stars. Rajeev Masand gave 1 star calling it "a singularly humourless film". Hindustan Times gave one star stating "It's a bizarre tale of an invisible kisser ". Firstpost gave negative reviews stating "Emraan Hashmi, intelligence and talent, everything is invisible in the film". Mohar Basu of The Times of India gave the movie 3 stars. Ritika Handoo of Zee News praised the performance of Emraan Hashmi. NDTV gave the movie only one star. Tushar Joshi of Daily News and Analysis criticised the movie as "There's nothing to see, not even Emraan Hashmi". The Indian Express gave only half a star. Vinayak Chakravorty of India Today gave the movie 2 stars.

== See also ==
- Mr. X in Bombay
