= Mirchi Music Award for Lyricist of The Year =

Indian music award for Hindi films

The Mirchi Music Award for Lyricist of The Year is given yearly by Radio Mirchi as a part of its annual Mirchi Music Awards for Hindi films, to recognise a lyricist who has delivered an outstanding performance in a film song.

== Superlatives ==
Superlative	Singer	Record
Most awards	Javed Akhtar	3
Most nominations	Amitabh Bhattacharya	11
Most nominations without ever winning	Niranjan Iyengar; Neelesh Misra; Anvita Dutt Guptan	2
Most nominations in a single year	Amitabh Bhattacharya	4 (2016)

== List of winners ==
- 2009 Javed Akhtar - "Jashn-e-Bahara from Jodha Akbar
  - Prasoon Joshi - "Behka" from Ghajini
  - Prasoon Joshi - "Guzarish" from 'Ghajini
  - Anvita Dutt Guptan - "Khuda Jaane" from Bachna Ae Haseeno
  - Prasoon Joshi - "Kaise Mujhe" from Ghajini
- 2010 Prasoon Joshi - "Masakali" from Delhi-6
- 2011 Gulzar - "Dil To Bachcha Hai" from Ishqiya
  - Niranjan Iyengar - "Sajdaa" from My Name is Khan
  - Faaiz Anwaar - "Tere Mast Mast Do Nain" from Dabangg
  - Niranjan Iyengar - "Tere Naina" from My Name is Khan
  - Gulzar - "Surili Akhiyon Wale" from Veer
- 2012 Javed Akhtar - "Khwabon Ke Parindey" from Zindagi Na Milegi Dobara
  - Rajat Aroraa - "Ishq Sufiyana" from The Dirty Picture
  - Irshad Kamil - "Nadaan Parinde" from Rockstar
  - Javed Akhtar - "Senorita" from Zindagi Na Milegi Dobara
  - Shabbir Ahmed & Neelesh Misra -"Teri Meri" from Bodyguard
- 2013 Javed Akhtar - "Jee Le Zara" from Talaash
  - Amitabh Bhattacharya - "Abhi Mujh Mein Kahin" from Agneepath
  - Neelesh Misra - "Kyon" from Barfi!
  - Sameer Anjaan - "Dagabaaz Re" Dabangg 2
  - Gulzar - "Saans" from Jab Tak Hai Jaan
- 2014 Prasoon Joshi - "Maston Ka Jhund" from Bhaag Milkha Bhaag
  - Mithoon - "Tum Hi Ho" from Aashiqui 2
  - Prasoon Joshi - "Zinda" from Bhaag Milkha Bhaag
  - Amitabh Bhattacharya - "Sawar Loon" from Lootera
  - Amitabh Bhattacharya - "Kabira" from Yeh Jawaani Hai Deewani
- 2015 Irshad Kamil - "Manwa Laage" from Happy New Year
  - Kausar Munir - "Suno Na Sangemarmar" from Youngistaan
  - Gulzar - "Bismil" from Haider
  - Manoj Muntashir - "Galliyan" from Ek Villain
  - Rashmi Singh - "Muskurane" from CityLights
- 2016 Varun Grover - "Moh Moh Ke Dhaage" from Dum Laga Ke Haisha
  - Irshad Kamil - "Agar Tum Saath Ho" - Tamasha
  - Javed Akhtar - "Phir Bhi Yeh Zindagi" from Dil Dhadakne Do
  - Siddharth-Garima, Nasir Faraaz & Ganesh Chandanshive - "Dewaani Mastani" from Bajirao Mastani
  - Mayur Puri - "Chunar" from ABCD 2
- 2017 Amitabh Bhattacharya - "Channa Mereya" from Ae Dil Hai Mushkil
  - Amitabh Bhattacharya - "Ae Dil Hai Mushkil" from Ae Dil Hai Mushkil
  - Amitabh Bhattacharya - "Bulleya" from Ae Dil Hai Mushkil
  - Amitabh Bhattacharya - "Haanikaraak Bapu" from Dangal
  - Irshad Kamil - "Jag Ghoomeya" from Sultan
- 2018 Irshad Kamil - "Hawayein" from Jab Harry Met Sejal
  - Anvita Dutt - "Sahiba" from Phillauri
  - Kumaar - "Pyar Ho" from Munna Michael
  - Kausar Munir - "Maana Ke Hum Yaar Nahin" from Meri Pyaari Bindu
  - Irshad Kamil - "Safar" from Jab Harry Met Sejal
  - Arafat Mehmood & Tanishk Bagchi - "Baarish" from Half Girlfriend
- 2019 Gulzar - "Ae Watan (Male)" from Raazi
  - Kumaar - "Tera Yaar Hoon Main" from Sonu Ke Titu Ki Sweety
  - A. M. Turaz - "Ek Dil Ek Jaan" from Padmaavat
  - Gulzar - "Dilbaro" from Raazi
  - Irshad Kamil - "Aahista" from Laila Majnu
- 2020 Amitabh Bhattacharya - "Kalank" from Kalank
  - Irshad Kamil - "Bekhayali" from Kabir Singh
  - Manoj Muntashir - "Teri Mitti" from Kesari
  - Prasoon Joshi - "Bharat" from Manikarnika: The Queen of Jhansi
  - Raj Shekhar - "Beh Chala" from Uri: The Surgical Strike
- 2021 Amitabh Bhattacharya (Lyricist of the Decade) - "Channa Mereya" from "Ae Dil Hai Mushkil
- 2022 Tanishk Bagchi – "Raataan Lambiyan" from Shershaah
  - Anvita Dutt – "Ranjha" from Shershaah
  - Gulzar – "Chhapaak (Title Track)" from Chhapaak
  - Irshad Kamil – "Chaka Chak" from Atrangi Re
  - Jaani – "Mann Bharryaa 2.0" from Shershaah
- 2023 Amitabh Bhattacharya – "Tur Kalleyan" from Laal Singh Chaddha
  - Amitabh Bhattacharya – "Kesariya" from Brahmāstra: Part One – Shiva
  - Amitabh Bhattacharya – "Ghodey Pe Sawar" from Qala
  - Kausar Munir – "Phero Na Najariya" from Qala
  - A. M. Turaz – "Jab Saiyaan" from Gangubai Kathiawadi

== See also ==
- Mirchi Music Awards
- Bollywood
- Cinema of India
