= Jigariyaa =

2014 Indian Hindi film by Raj Purohit

- Theatrical release poster
- Directed by: Raj Purohit
- Screenplay by: Raj Purohit; Apratim Khare
- Story by: Vinod Bachchan
- Produced by: Raju Chadha; Vinod Bachchan
- Starring: Harshvardhan Deo; Cherry Mardia
- Cinematography: Sriram Ganapathy
- Edited by: Ranjeet Bahadur, Karan Varia, Mahesh Allala
- Music by: Agnel Roman- Faizan; Raj-Prakash; Anshuman Pratap Singh
- Production companies: Wave Cinemas Ponty Chadha; A Soundarya Production
- Distributed by: Wave Cinemas Distribution
- Release date: 10 October 2014
- Country: India
- Language: Hindi

Jigariyaa (transl. Heartfelt) is a 2014 Indian Hindi-language romantic film directed by Raj Purohit. The movie stars Harshvardhan Deo and Cherry Mardia in the lead roles. The first look of the film was unveiled by Rohit Shetty in Mumbai on 26 August 2014. The film is inspired by real life and was released on 10 October 2014.

== Synopsis ==
Inspired by true events, Jigariyaa tells the story of Shyamlal "Shaamu" Gupta and Radhika "Radha" Sharma. Shaamu, the only son of Halwaai Ramlal Gupta, is a happy-go-lucky boy who lives in Agra. He spends his days writing poetry, admired by his motley group of good-for-nothing friends. Radhika, the only daughter of Pandit Shankar Dayal Sharma, is a well-educated and caring girl who helps her father in his endeavours as a social do-gooder and a man of high reputation in Mathura. Shaamu falls in love with Raadha at first sight, who is visiting her maternal grandmother's house in Agra, thus beginning his quest to find this elusive girl in the streets of Agra. As they grow fond of each other, destiny takes another turn and the two lovers break apart.

== Cast ==
- Harshvardhan Deo as Shaamu
- Cherry Mardia as Raadha
- Virendra Saxena as Shaamu's father
- K. K. Raina as Raadha's father
- Navni Parihar as Raadha's mother
- Natasha Rastogi as Shaamu's mother
- Vineeta Malik as Raadha's maternal grandmother
- Deepak Chadha as Raadha's maternal uncle
- Ketan Singh
- Sneha Deori

== Soundtrack ==
Jigariyaa Soundtrack
No.	Title	Singer(s)	Length
1.	"Arziyaan"	Vikrant Bhartiya, Aishwarya Majmudar	04:27
2.	"Ishq Hai (Reprise)"	Javed Ali, Yashika Sikka	05:06
3.	"Ishq Hai"	Javed Ali	04:26
4.	"Jigariyaa"	Javed Bashir	05:12
5.	"Mora Rangddar Saiyyaan"	Prajakta Shukre, Roop Kumar Rathod	05:01
6.	"Phurr Phurr"	Aishwarya Majmudar, Manjira Ganguly, Agnel Roman	06:13
7.	"Rang Rang De"	Suchi, Jatinder Pal Singh, Yashika Sikka	05:57
Total length:			31:55

== Awards and nominations ==
Award	Category	Recipients and nominees	Result	Ref.
7th Mirchi Music Awards	Upcoming Music Composer of The Year	Raj-Prakash - "Arziyaan"	Won	
7th Mirchi Music Awards	Upcoming Lyricist of The Year	Faraaz Ahmed - "Arziyaan"	Nominated	
