= Cherry Mardia =

Indian film and television actress (born 1992)

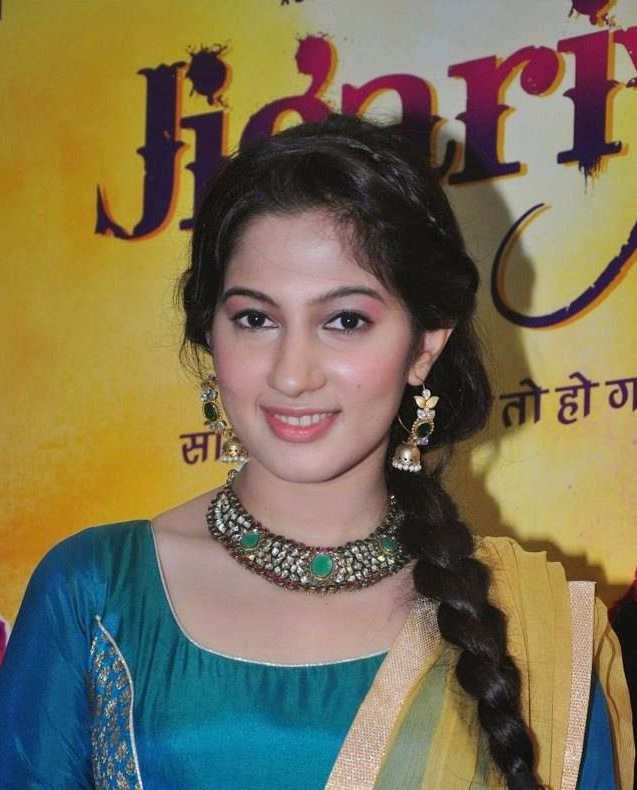
- Cherry Mardia at Jigariyaa Trailer Launch
- Born: Mumbai, India
- Occupations: Model, Actress

Cherry Mardia is an Indian film and television actress. She is known for role in Jigariyaa, Kadaram Kondan and Holiday: A Soldier Is Never Off Duty.

== Career ==
She made her acting debut in Bollywood in 2014 film Holiday: A Soldier Is Never Off Duty. She was the lead actress in the film Jigariyaa. The film was critically appreciated and her performance garnered much praise. In 2019, she starred in Kadaram Kondan, which marked her Tamil debut.

== Filmography ==
=== TV series ===
Year	Program	Role	Notes
2014	Gumrah: End of Innocence		Episodic role alongside Vikrant Massey
2018	Anjaan: Special Crimes Unit	ACP Shivani Joglekar	

=== Films ===
Year	Film	Role	Notes
2014	Holiday: A Soldier Is Never Off Duty	Preeti Bakshi	
2014	Jigariyaa	Radha	Lead role
2016	Robinhood Ke Pote	Apoorva	
2019	Kadaram Kondan	Catherine Williams	Tamil film
