= Mirchi Music Awards =

Annual Indian film music award ceremony

- Awarded for: Best in Hindi music
- Country: India
- Presented by: Radio Mirchi
- First award: 2009
- Final award: 2024
- Website: radiomirchi.com/mma

Television/radio coverage
- Network: Zee TV / ZEE5 (2015–2020); Colors TV (2012–2014, 2021–Present); Sony TV (2009–2011)

Mirchi Music Awards are presented annually by Radio Mirchi to honour both artistic and technical excellence of professionals in the Hindi language film music industry of India. The awards, given in seventeen different categories, were instituted to award the best of 2008. In 2010, the Southern edition of the awards – Mirchi Music Awards South was launched, to award the best of 2009. through which artists from the four South Indian film industries—Tamil, Telugu, Kannada and Malayalam—are being honoured. In 2012, the Bengali edition of the awards – Mirchi Music Awards Bangla was launched, to award the best of 2011. The 2019 Mirchi Music Awards is co-powered by Smule, the world's largest music social network, and will have the winner of the Smule Mirchi Cover Star perform on stage at the event.

== Ceremonies ==
Ceremony	Date	Host(s)
1st Mirchi Music Awards	28 March 2009	Shaan and Tulip Joshi
2nd Mirchi Music Awards	10 February 2010	
3rd Mirchi Music Awards	27 January 2011	Shaan and Sonu Nigam
4th Mirchi Music Awards	21 March 2012	Shaan and Usha Uthup
5th Mirchi Music Awards	7 February 2013	Ayushmann Khurana and Meiyang Chang
6th Mirchi Music Awards	27 February 2014	Sonu Nigam
7th Mirchi Music Awards	26 February 2015	Ayushmann Khurana, Aditya Narayan and Karishma Tanna
8th Mirchi Music Awards	29 February 2016	Sonu Nigam
9th Mirchi Music Awards	18 February 2017	Sonu Nigam
10th Mirchi Music Awards	28 January 2018	Sonu Nigam
11th Mirchi Music Awards	16 February 2019	Sonu Nigam
12th Mirchi Music Awards	19 February 2020	Shekhar Ravjiani, Neeti Mohan andAparshakti Khurana
13th Mirchi Music Awards Decade Best	3 February 2021	Sonu Nigam
14th Mirchi Music Awards	19 March 2022	Sonu Nigam
15th Mirchi Music Awards	3 November 2023	RJ Prerna
16th Mirchi Music Awards	11 December 2024	

== Jury Choice Awards ==
The jury for consists of several experts from the music industry.

- Song of The Year
- Album of The Year
- Male Vocalist of The Year
- Female Vocalist of The Year
- Music Composer of The Year
- Lyricist of The Year
- Upcoming Male Vocalist of The Year
- Upcoming Female Vocalist of The Year
- Upcoming Music Composer of The Year
- Upcoming Lyricist of The Year

== Technical Awards ==
=== Sound Engineer of the Year ===
Year	Recipient	Song	Film
2014	Satchith Harve and Praveen Muralidhar	"Manwa Laage"	Happy New Year

=== Song Mixing ===
Year	Recipient	Song	Film
2011	Vijay Dayal & Mark 'Exit' Goodchild	"Chammak Challo"	Ra.One
2010	Salman Khan Afridi & Farhad K Dadyburjor	"Dil To Bachcha Hai"	Ishqiya
2009	H. Sridhar, S. Sivakumar, Deepak. P. A., Vivianne Chaix	"Dilli 6"	Delhi-6
2008	H. Sridhar	"Jashn-e-Bahara"	Jodhaa Akbar

=== Programming and Arranging ===
Year	Recipient	Song	Film
2016	Santosh Mulekar & Shankar–Ehsaan–Loy	"Kaaga"	Mirzya
2014	Bharat Goel & Meet Bros Anjjan	"Baby Doll"	Ragini MMS 2
2011	Abhijeet Nalani & Giorgio Tuinfort	"Chammak Challo"	Ra.One
2010	Shankar–Ehsaan–Loy	"Noor E Khuda"	My Name is Khan
2009	A. R. Rahman	"Masakali"	Delhi-6
2008	T. R. Kishna Chettan	"Jashn-e-Bahara"	Jodhaa Akbar

=== Film Background Score ===
Year	Recipient	Film
2022	Pritam	Brahmāstra: Part One – Shiva
2021	Sandeep Shirodkar	Tanhaji
2020 ( Film Background Score of the Decade)	Shantanu Moitra	Madras Cafe
2019	Mangesh Dhakde	Article 15
2018	Sanchit Balhara	Padmaavat
2017	Vishal Bhardwaj	Rangoon
2016	Tubby-Parik	Mirzya
2015	Sanchit Balhara	Bajirao Mastani
2014	Vishal Bhardwaj	Haider
2013	Shantanu Moitra	Madras Cafe
2012	Clinton Cerejo	Kahaani
2011	Ram Sampath	Delhi Belly
2010	Sandeep Shirodkar	Dabangg
2009	Raju Singh	Raaz 2
2008	A. R. Rahman	Jodhaa Akbar

== Listeners' Choice Awards ==
=== Song of The Year ===
Year	Song	Film	Composer	Writer
2023	"Phir Aur Kya Chahiye"	Zara Hatke Zara Bachke	Sachin-Jigar	Amitabh Bhattacharya
2022	(Not Awarded)
2020-2021	"Chaka Chak"	Atrangi Re	A.R. Rahman	Irshad Kamil
(Song of the Decade)	"Agar Tum Saath Ho"	Tamasha	A.R. Rahman	Irshad Kamil
2019	"Bekhayali"	Kabir Singh	Sachet–Parampara	Irshad Kamil
2018	"Dil Chori"	Sonu Ke Titu Ki Sweety	Yo Yo Honey Singh	Yo Yo Honey Singh (Adtnl: Singhsta & Oye Sherraa)
2017	"Phir Bhi Tumko Chaahunga"	Half Girlfriend	Mithoon	Manoj Muntashir
2016	"Soch Na Sake"	Airlift	Amaal Mallik	Kumaar
2015	"Agar Tum Saath Ho"	Tamasha	A. R. Rahman	Irshad Kamil
2014	"Muskurane"	CityLights	Jeet Gannguli	Rashmi Singh
2013	"Sunn Raha Hai"	Aashiqui 2	Ankit Tiwari	Sandeep Nath
2012	"Radha"	Student of the Year	Vishal–Shekhar	Anvita Dutt
2011	"Naadan Parindey"	Rockstar	A. R. Rahman	Irshad Kamil
2010	"Sheila Ki Jawani"	Tees Maar Khan	Vishal–Shekhar	Vishal Dadlani
2009	"Iktara"	Wake Up Sid	Amit Trivedi	Javed Akhtar
2008	"Kabhi Kabhi Aditi"	Jaane Tu... Ya Jaane Na	A. R. Rahman	Abbas Tyrewala

=== Album of The Year ===
Year	Film	Artist
2020-2021	Atrangi Re	A.R. Rahman
( Album of the Decade)	Aashiqui 2	Mithoon, Ankit Tiwari, Jeet Gannguli
2019	Kabir Singh	Sachet–Parampara, Amaal Mallik, Mithoon, Vishal Mishra, Akhil Sachdeva
2018	Sonu Ke Titu Ki Sweety	Yo Yo Honey Singh, Amaal Mallik, Zack Knight, Guru Randhawa, Rochak Kohli, Rajat Nagpal, Saurabh-Vaibhav
2017	Jagga Jasoos	Pritam Chakraborty
2016	Dangal	Pritam Chakraborty
2015	Roy	Amaal Mallik, Meet Bros Anjjan, Ankit Tiwari
2014	Ek Villain	Mithoon, Ankit Tiwari & Soch (Band)
2013	Aashiqui 2	Mithoon, Ankit Tiwari & Jeet Gannguli
2012	Student of the Year	Vishal–Shekhar
2011	Rockstar	A. R. Rahman
2010	Once Upon A Time in Mumbaai	Pritam Chakraborty
2009	Ajab Prem Ki Ghazab Kahani	Pritam Chakraborty
2008	Jaane Tu... Ya Jaane Na	A. R. Rahman

== Special awards ==
=== Jury Award for Outstanding Contribution to Hindi Film Music ===
Year	Award recipient	Profession
2019	Amar Haldipur	Music Composer
2018	Rajendra Singh Sodha	Musician
2017	Ameen Sayani	Radio Announcer
2016	Y. S.Mulky	Musician
2015	Yogesh	Lyricist
2014	Burjor Lord	Musician
2013	Sumit Mitra	Musician
2012	Babloo Chakroborty	Musician
2011	Babla Shah	Music composer
2010	Charanjit Singh	Musician
2009	Kersi Lord	Music composer, arranger
2008	Manohari Singh	Music arranger

=== Best item number song ===
Year	Song	Recipient	Film
2011	"Ooh La La"	Bappi Lahiri, Shreya Ghoshal; Rajat Arora; Vishal–Shekhar	The Dirty Picture

=== Lifetime Achievement Award / K. L. Saigal Sangeet Shehenshah Award ===
The award was given to Indian playback singer Lata Mangeshkar in 2008. The award was renamed in 2009 as K. L. Saigal Sangeet Shehenshah Award, in honour of singer Kundan Lal Saigal. The award was given to Indian Playback singer K. J. Yesudas in 2010.

Year	Award recipient	Profession
2022	Suman Kalyanpur	Singer
2020	Bhupinder Singh	Singer
2019	Usha Mangeshkar	Singer
2018	Usha Khanna	Music Composer
2017	Bappi Lahiri	Music Composer, Singer
2016	Usha Uthup	Singer
2015	Rajesh Roshan	Music composer
2014	Javed Akhtar	Lyricist
2013	Anand Ji	Music Director
2012	Asha Bhosle	Singer
2011	Mohammed Zahur Khayyam	Music composer
2010	Ravi	Music composer
2009	Manna Dey	Singer
2008	Lata Mangeshkar	Singer
