= Suno Na Sangemarmar =

Song performed by Arijit Singh

- Cover of the song, featuring actors Jackky Bhagnani, Neha Sharma

Song by Arijit Singh

from the album Youngistaan
- Released: 6 February 2014
- Genre: Filmi
- Length: 3:21
- Label: T-Series
- Songwriter: Kausar Munir

Music video
- "Suno Na Sangemarmar" on YouTube

"Suno Na Sangemarmar" (transl. Listen to the marble) is a romantic song from the 2014 Hindi film Youngistaan. Composed by Jeet Ganguly, the song is sung by Arijit Singh, with lyrics penned by Kausar Munir. The music video of the track features actors Jackky Bhagnani and Neha Sharma. Times of India declared the song as top romantic song of the year 2014 as per the received vote on itimes.com/polls

== Background ==
The song is composed by Jeet Ganguly and sung by Arijit Singh. This is their second collaboration in a film after Aashiqui 2 (2013), where Singh rendered four songs titled "Chahun Main Ya Naa", "Hum Mar Jayenge", "Milne Hai Mujhse Aayi" and "Aasan Nahi Yahan". The music video of the song which features Jackky Bhagnani and Neha Sharma is shot around the Taj Mahal which is located in Agra. It also explores the view of the monumental parks in Lucknow. The song is choreographed by Feroz Khan.

The song is the Hindi version of the Bengali song "Ki Kore Toke Bolbo" from Rangbaaz (2013), which is composed by Ganguly and rendered by Singh. The tune of the song has a classic touch within it, where both the interludes have flute played in 90's style. The lyrics of the song is penned by Kausar Munir. Regarding the use of "sangemarmar" in the lyrics of the song, Munir stated: "There was a huge discussion about the word 'sangemarmar' in the song, but it fell beautifully into the film and became a hit".

== Release and response ==
The music video of the song was released officially on 6 February 2014, through the YouTube channel of Multi Screen Media, and was released, labelled as the "Valentine song of the year". It was later released on other distributing label partners on 13 February 2014. The full song was released on 24 February 2014, along with other tracks from the album. The song was the first track released from the film.

The song was ranked at the ninth position in the "Bollywood music report January–June 2014" published by The Times of India. It was placed at the fourth position in the Music category of "Top search trends for 2014" which was revealed by Microsoft's search engine Bing. The song was ranked at the third position in the list of "Top 10 critically best songs" published by The Times of India.

=== Chart performance ===
On 21 March 2014, the song had a direct entry at position 16 in The Times of India Mirchi Top 20 Chart, moved up to position 11 on 28 March 2014, and was placed at position 6 on 4 April 2014, labelled as the highest gainer of the week. On 11 April 2014, the song jumped to the position 2 again as the highest gainer of the week, before falling to position 3 on 18 April 2014.

Chart (2014)	Peak position	Ref.
The Times of India Mirchi Top 20 Chart	2	
Top Asian Download Charts	20	

== Critical reception ==
The song received mostly positive reaction from the music critics.

Bollywood Hungama's Rajiv Vijayakar felt, the lyrics by Kausar Munir is "relevant and meaningful" when adapted to the situation in film, and described the song as "soulful, placid and mellifluous". Nishevitha Vijayanand from Movie Talkies who praised the vocals by Arijit Singh and the lyrics by Munir, stated: "this one surely has the potential to become a chart-buster if the film manages to win over its target audience". Glamsham's Rafat stated, Singh is the right choice for the track and he felt that the USP of the song is Munir lyrics with parallels drawn to Taj Mahal.

Priya Adivarekar from The Indian Express commented: "The theme of romance and backdrop of the Taj Mahal adds an extra charm, while the overall music arrangement is easy on the ears". Joginder Tuteja from Rediff.com thought the sound of the flute and overall arrangement resembles that of "Zara Zara" from Rehnaa Hai Terre Dil Mein (2001), and further stated, the track takes "sometimes to grow" on the listeners. Sheetal Tiwari from Bollywood Spice commented: "Lyrics are effective if not entirely eloquent, however, the parallels drawn with the Taj Mahal are endearing".

== Accolades ==
Year	Award	Category	Nominee	Result	Ref
2014	Stardust Awards	Best Male Playback Singer	Arijit Singh	Nominated	
2014	Stardust Awards	Best Lyricist	Kausar Munir	Nominated	
2015	60th Britannia Filmfare Awards	Best Male Playback Singer	Arijit Singh	Nominated	
2015	60th Britannia Filmfare Awards	Best Lyricist	Kausar Munir	Nominated	
2015	Global Indian Music Academy Awards	Best Male Playback Singer	Arijit Singh	Nominated	
2015	7th Mirchi Music Awards	Lyricist of the Year	Kausar Munir	Nominated	
