= Jab Harry Met Sejal =

2017 Indian film by Imtiaz Ali

- Theatrical release poster
- Directed by: Imtiaz Ali
- Written by: Imtiaz Ali
- Produced by: Gauri Khan
- Starring: Anushka Sharma; Shah Rukh Khan
- Cinematography: K. U. Mohanan
- Edited by: Aarti Bajaj
- Music by: Songs: Pritam Diplo; Background Score: Hitesh Sonik
- Production company: Red Chillies Entertainment
- Distributed by: NH Studios (India); Mangal Murti Films (India); Yash Raj Films (Worldwide)
- Release date: 4 August 2017 (India)
- Running time: 144 minutes
- Country: India
- Language: Hindi
- Budget: ₹90 crore
- Box office: est. ₹153.43 crore

Jab Harry Met Sejal (transl. When Harry met Sejal), abbreviated as JHMS, is a 2017 Indian Hindi-language romantic comedy film written and directed by Imtiaz Ali. It stars Anushka Sharma and Shah Rukh Khan in their third collaboration after Rab Ne Bana Di Jodi (2008) and Jab Tak Hai Jaan (2012). Pre-production of the film began in April 2015 and principal photography commenced in August 2016 in Prague, Amsterdam, Vienna, Lisbon and Budapest.

Jab Harry Met Sejal released on 4 August 2017 to mixed-to-negative reviews from critics and audiences, with criticism for its direction, story, screenplay, and Sharma's performance, but praise for the soundtrack, cinematography, production design, costumes, and Khan's performance. It was a box-office failure in India; however, it was fairly successful overseas.

At the 63rd Filmfare Awards, Jab Harry Met Sejal received 2 nominations – Best Music Director (Pritam) and Best Female Playback Singer (Nikhita Gandhi for "Ghar").

== Plot ==
Harinder "Harry" Singh Nehra, a tour guide in Europe, hails from the small village of Nurmahal in Punjab. Harry had run off to Canada in his youth to pursue his dream of becoming a singer. However, things didn’t go as planned, and he eventually ended up in Europe, where he became a tour guide. Harry, a charming but cynical man, hides a deep sense of loneliness, guilt, and homesickness. He is also a womaniser, though his flirtations and affairs seem more like distractions than genuine connections.

Sejal Zaveri, a lively and somewhat naïve Gujarati lawyer, loses her engagement ring while on a European vacation with her family. After the trip ends, she decides to stay back and retrace her steps to find the ring. She enlists Harry’s help, much to his reluctance, as he sees her as an unnecessary inconvenience. Harry and Sejal set off on a journey across Europe exploring cities, like AmsterdamPrague, and Budapest. As they travel together their contrasting personalities lead to situations, honest conversations and unexpected emotions. With time Harry begins to let his guard down. Sejal starts seeing past his confident façade to the sensitive person underneath. Through their disagreements and growing trust the two gradually develop a deeper bond making their journey more meaningful than either expected.

During their search, they learn that the ring is with an illegal immigrant and small-time criminal, Ghyassuddin "Gas" Mohammed Qureshi, who is based in Portugal. When they confront Gas, Harry ends up getting beaten by his men. Sejal looks through her bag for antiseptics in order to treat Harry's wound. To her shock, she finds the ring, realising it was in her bag all along. However, she doesn’t tell Harry, as she doesn’t want their journey—and her growing closeness to him—to end. This moment marks the beginning of Sejal realising her feelings for Harry.

After escaping from Gas and his men, they both share an intimate moment. But Harry decides not to cross the line because Sejal isn't the same as his previous distractions. The next day, Sejal insists Harry that they go to Frankfurt to attend his friend Mayank's wedding with Irina. Though hesitant, Harry eventually agrees. At the wedding, Mayank and Irina notice the chemistry between Harry and Sejal and inquire about their relationship. Later, Harry and Sejal get into a heated argument about where they stand; Harry denies living in delusion knowing the hurt it will cause him if and when Sejal decides to leave for home. Sejal prompts Harry numerous times to admit what he truly wants, but Harry, weighed down by an inferiority complex, refuses. He dismisses the idea that someone like Sejal could ever leave her fiancé for a man like him—a mere tour guide. After the argument, with Harry not admitting his true feelings and her sister and fiancé asking her to forget the ring and return home, Sejal decides to fly back to India. She asks Harry to book a flight for the next day. Harry is heartbroken even though he had anticipated her leaving, but once again, he decides to do the right thing.

The next day, Harry accompanies Sejal to the airport. Before boarding, Sejal reveals that she had found the ring in her bag a couple of days ago. Harry, masking his pain, bids her a bittersweet goodbye, asking her to take care of herself. After Sejal leaves, Harry struggles to return to his old life. He becomes distracted at work, often zoning out and thinking about her. Mayank, noticing Harry’s turmoil, advises him to let her go, reminding him that he never confessed his feelings. Spurred by Mayank’s words and a sudden desire to take a leap of faith, Harry decides to travel to India and tell Sejal how he feels. He arrives at her wedding, only to learn that the marriage has been called off. Stepping outside, he finds Sejal sitting alone in the hope that she might find him there. They finally share their true feelings for each other and in an intimate moment, decide to get married.

As a couple, Harry and Sejal visit his village, Nurmahal, in Punjab. In an emotional homecoming, Harry reunites with his family, whom he had left behind years ago. The film ends with profound lines from Rumi, "What you seek is seeking you" translated into Hindi and used in a celebratory song as the credits roll, marking a joyful conclusion to their journey.

== Cast ==
- Anushka Sharma as Sejal Zaveri
- Shah Rukh Khan as Harinder "Harry" Singh Nehra
- Aru Krishansh Verma as Mayank
- Chandan Roy Sanyal as Ghyassuddin Mohammed Qureshi (Gas)
- Evelyn Sharma as Irina
- Kavi Shastri as Rupen, Sejal's fiancé
- Baljeet Kaur Nanda as Mrs. Nehra, Harry's mother

== Production ==
=== Development ===
Ali initially offered Khan a different script involving a man who was suicidal, which Khan rejected, asking for a happier script, leading to Ali offering Khan Jab Harry Met Sejal instead.

Production of the film began in April 2016 and plans to filming were announced in the first part of August 2016, when the film had the working title "Production No. 52". Sharma required several months of diction training to prepare herself for her role, as her character is from Gujarat. She describes her character as "very superficial, doesn't have any depth as a person. There is no similarity with me. But her morals and values of self-respect are something that I can relate to. But otherwise, the character is quite impulsive by nature."

The film underwent a lot of name changes throughout its production phase from The Ring to Rahnuma to Raula until it was finalized with Jab Harry Met Sejal. When the title of the film was finally revealed, it received considerable backlash from people who accused that it must be a copy of the iconic 1989 Hollywood romantic comedy When Harry Met Sally... or that it must have been inspired by it. However, contrary to popular beliefs, the two films have no similarity or connection with one another except both fall under the same genre and the two protagonists start off as strangers. Khan explained, "When Harry Met Sally... is one of the greatest love stories ever made in the history of world cinema. Our film on the other hand, is quite original, a fun space love story by Imtiaz Ali. But it is a takeoff from there as that film is a classic. It is a way to attribute."

In an interview with The Indian Express, Khan discussed about the possible epilogue of the film; the couple had three children and moved to a small town for some time. Sejal then works as a lawyer while Harry takes time off and writes a book. The former takes the role of a working partner while the latter looks after the children.

=== Filming ===
Filming began in late August 2016 in Prague and continued in Amsterdam and Budapest from September 2016. Filming locations include multiple locations in Europe, as well as in Punjab.

== Soundtrack ==
The film's music was composed by Pritam, with lyrics written by Irshad Kamil. The music rights were purchased by Sony Music India. The soundtrack was preceded by five songs that were released as singles — "Radha", "Beech Beech Mein", "Safar", "Butterfly" and "Hawayein" — before the album being released on 30 July 2017. American DJ Diplo composed the song "Phurrr" with Pritam, which was released on 3 August 2017 as a single version, and not included in the album.

== Release ==
Jab Harry Met Sejal was initially set for an 11 August 2017 release. However, it was later moved a week earlier to 4 August eidrelease date in Dubai and United Arab Emirates was pushed from early Thursday morning – which has been the norm for Bollywood films – to Friday evening to prevent pirated versions of the film or its spoilers from getting leaked. However, after a backlash, it was decided to release it on its original release date, 3 August, at 6 pm GST. The film was released on 3400 screens worldwide.

== Reception ==
Anita Iyer of Khaleej Times rated the film 2.5 out of 5 stars and said, "The film goes through its ebb and flow, and all you can do is enjoy the good bits, till they last." Manjusha Radhakrishnan of Gulf News also rated it 2.5 stars out of 5, saying "The climax isn't ground-breaking, however, the cinematography that highlights the beauty of a handful European countries is pleasing to watch."

Yahoo gave the film 3.5 stars out of 5 calling it a complete entertainer. Koimoi gave Jab Harry Met Sejal 3.5 stars out of 5, praising the performances and direction.

The Times of India gave the film 3 stars of out 5 and wrote, "Sound advice here would be that you actually buy yourself a tour ticket to Europe and soak in the sights for real. But, if you want to settle for a cheaper option of touring the continent inside a cinema hall, buy yourself a JHMS ticket and get transported to the land of make-believe captured indulgently by cinematographer K. U. Mohanan, with the added advantage of a Punjabi 'munda' playing your friend, philosopher, lover and guide." Filmfare Magazine gave the film 3 stars out of 5 stating that, "JHMS is a happy romantic comedy that you can sing and dance along with. Pritam's music is a stand out feature. The performances are really strong".

NDTV gave JHMS 2/5 and wrote, "It is cinema's equivalent of a shiny bauble that glitters wholly in vain. Watch it only if you fancy a vicarious romp through Europe with an off-colour megastar trying hard to get going". Shubhra Gupta, critic of Indian Express gave JHMS 1.5 stars out of 5 stars while calling it a dud. Giving Jab Harry Met Sejal 2 stars out of 5, Hindustan Times wrote, "Lethargic storytelling kills Shah Rukh Khan-Anushka Sharma's film. It's a big disappointment to see Shah Rukh Khan returning to his comfort zone and yet not performing on top of his powers." Bollywood Hungama gave the film 2 stars out of 5 and wrote, "Jab Harry Met Sejal has its moments. But the film is riddled with cliches and flaws that takes the film down, thanks to the poor script." Rajeev Masand of News18 wrote "After successfully exploiting themes of self-discovery in Jab We Met (2007) and Rockstar (2011), it became clear watching Tamasha (2015) that Imtiaz may be running out of ideas. There are just so many times you can romanticize self-healing and coming-of-age before it all starts to feel contrived. In the case of this film, frankly Harry and Sejal come off as characters in search of a plot." Anupama Chopra of Film Companion wrote "The problem is that Imtiaz is unable to mould the larger-than-life romantic persona of Shah Rukh into his own more bruised brand of romance. Twenty-two years later, Shah Rukh is still Raj – tender, sensitive and resolutely chaste – at least with the woman he loves."

In a retrospective assessment, during his appearance on the podcast Unfiltered by Samdish, Imtiaz Ali stated that the film was a missed opportunity, rating the film a 3 out of 10.

== Box office ==
The film's box office gross is ₹153.43 crore (US$16 million), including ₹89.4 crore (US$9.3 million) in India and ₹64.1 crore (US$6.7 million) overseas. The film under-performed at the domestic box office. However, the film was an overseas success, grossing US$10 million overseas, making it the year's second highest overseas grosser among Hindi films, behind only Raees, another Shah Rukh Khan-starrer.

=== Domestic ===
The film collected ₹15.25 crore on opening day, becoming the lowest opener for a Shah Rukh Khan film in three years. On the second day, it collected ₹15 crores, followed by its third day's collection of ₹15.5 crores, bringing its first weekend's collection to ₹45.75 crores, and making it 2017's sixth-highest first-weekend-collecting Bollywood film in the domestic market.

Nevertheless, the weekend box office collection of the film did not manage to cross ₹50 crores, and it emerged as one of the lowest openers of Shah Rukh Khan in recent years.

=== Overseas ===
On the first day, the film collected ₹50.57 lakh (US$53,000) from 27 screens in Australia, ₹20.83 lakh (US$22,000) from 20 screens in New Zealand, ₹1.1 crore (US$110,000) from 104 screens in the United Kingdom, ₹2.44 crore (US$250,000) from 252 screens in the United States and ₹58.26 lakh (US$60,000) from 26 screens in Canada. On the second day, the film collected ₹18.96 lakh (US$20,000) from 10 screens in Australia, ₹16.01 lakh (US$17,000) from 16 screens in New Zealand, ₹1.17 crore (US$120,000) from 105 screens in the UK, ₹25.3 million (US$260,000) from 251 screens in the US and ₹7,175,000 (US$75,000) from 26 screens in Canada. On the first Sunday, it collected ₹3,330,000 (US$35,000) from 31 screens in Australia, ₹1,201,000 (US$12,000) from 21 screens in New Zealand, ₹79.69 lakh (US$83,000) from 106 screens in the UK, ₹1.57 crore (US$160,000) from 249 screens in the US and ₹47.17 lakh (US$49,000) from 26 screens in Canada. On the fourth day of release, the film collected ₹7.29 lakh (US$7,600) from 23 screens in Australia and ₹3.78 lakh (US$3,900) from 18 screens in New Zealand.

== Accolades ==
Award Ceremony	Category	Recipient	Result	Ref.(s)
International Indian Film Academy Awards	Best Playback Singer Male	Arijit Singh – "Hawayein"	Won	
10th Mirchi Music Awards	Song of The Year	"Hawayein"	Won	
10th Mirchi Music Awards	Album of The Year	Pritam, Irshad Kamil	Won	
10th Mirchi Music Awards	Male Vocalist of The Year	Arijit Singh – "Hawayein"	Won	
10th Mirchi Music Awards	Music Composer of The Year	Pritam – "Hawayein"	Won	
10th Mirchi Music Awards	Lyricist of The Year	Irshad Kamil – "Hawayein"	Won	
10th Mirchi Music Awards	Lyricist of The Year	Irshad Kamil – "Safar"	Nominated	
10th Mirchi Music Awards	Female Vocalist of The Year	Nikhita Gandhi – "Ghar"	Nominated	
10th Mirchi Music Awards	Best Song Producer (Programming & Arranging)	Tanuj Tiku, Dj Phukan & Sunny M.R. – "Ghar"	Nominated	
10th Mirchi Music Awards	Best Background Score	Hitesh Sonik	Nominated	
Filmfare Awards	Best Music Director	Pritam	Nominated	
Filmfare Awards	Best Female Playback Singer	Nikhita Gandhi – "Ghar"	Nominated	
Asian Customer Engagement Forum and Awards	Capability Award – Best Use of Social Media for Jab Harry Met Sejal	Red Chillies Entertainment – "Safar"	Won	
Screen Awards	Best Music	Pritam	Nominated	
Screen Awards	Best Playback Singer (Male)	Arijit Singh (for the song "Hawayein")	Nominated	
