= Youngistaan =

2014 Indian film directed by Syed Ahmad Afzal

Youngistan
- Theatrical release poster
- Directed by: Syed Ahmad Afzal
- Written by: Syed Ahmad Afzal; Maitrey Bajpai; Ramiz Ilham Khan
- Produced by: MSM Motion Pictures; Vashu Bhagnani
- Starring: Jackky Bhagnani; Neha Sharma; Farooq Sheikh
- Cinematography: Amalendu Chaudhary
- Edited by: Anuradha Singh
- Music by: Score: Salim–Sulaiman; Songs: Jeet Gannguli; Sneha Khanwalkar; Shiraz Uppal; Shree Isshq
- Production companies: MSM Motion Pictures; Pooja Entertainment and Films Ltd.
- Distributed by: PVR Pictures
- Release date: 28 March 2014
- Running time: 133 minutes
- Country: India
- Language: Hindi
- Box office: est. ₹9.45 crore (US$980,000)

Youngistaan (transl. Land of the young) is a 2014 Indian Hindi-language romance political film directed by Syed Ahmad Afzal. It stars Jackky Bhagnani, Neha Sharma and Farooq Sheikh The film is a love story set against the backdrop of Indian politics. It marked the posthumous appearance of Sheikh following his death on 28 December 2013. It was a remake of the Telugu film Leader (2010). Sheikh’s performance as Akbar Patel was notably praised.

== Plot ==
Youngistaan is a love story set against the backdrop of Indian politics. It is the story of Abhimanyu Kaul and the love of his life, Anwita Chauhan.

Abhimanyu Kaul, a young man living an ordinary life in Japan, finds himself in the political spotlight due to the sudden death of his father, the Prime Minister of India. Abhimanyu struggles to balance his complicated personal relationships with the political resistance against him from his own party. Being a public figure and reluctantly accepting to represent the governing party, much against his own wishes and at the cost of his private life, is a double-edged sword that Abhimanyu must walk on.

Although most officials considered an amateur and incapable of handling large issues by everyone except Akbar Patel, Secretary to the P.M. Abhimanyu ends up succeeding.

== Cast ==
- Jackky Bhagnani as Abhimanyu "Abhi" Kaul, a video game developer in Japan and the youngest prime minister of India
- Neha Sharma as Anvita Chauhan, Abhimanyu's love interest
- Farooq Sheikh as Akbar Patel / Akbar Uncle
- Prakash Belawadi as Murli Mukundan
- Deepankar De as Shubhodeep Ganguly popularly known as Shubho Da (president of ABKP Party, interim prime minister and later president)
- Brijendra Kala as an unnamed Kulfi / alcohol vendor
- Mita Vashisht as Suhasini Singh Deo
- Triveni Sangam Bahuguna as Ajay Thakur
- Nilesh Rai as Nilesh
- Kayoze Irani as Zafar, Abhimanyu's colleague in Japan (Special appearance)
- Boman Irani as Dashrath Kaul, Abhimanyu's late father and deceased prime minister of India (Cameo appearance)
- Shah Rukh Khan in an archive appearance from 2005 film Silsiilay

== Production and promotion ==
While the first schedule of the film took place in Indore, Lucknow and overseas – the second schedule was held at the Taj Mahal in Agra, where a campaign titled Yo Youngistan Go Youngistan was launched.

The first trailer of Youngistaan was unveiled at a suburban multiplex in Mumbai on 1 February 2014.

== Critical reception ==
Shubha Shetty-Saha of Mid-Day gave 2.5 out of 5 stars stating, "While the movie has a very interesting premise, it is totally diluted by lazy scriptwriting and sketchy direction." Shubhra Gupta of The Indian Express rated it 2 out of 5 stars and stated "The film, despite its efforts, becomes muddled, and dull."

Anupama Chopra of Hindustan Times rated the film 1 out of 5 stars saying "Youngistaan is brain-dead and insufferable." Paloma Sharma of Rediff.com rated the film 1 out of 5 stars saying "Youngistaan neither says something new nor does it reinforce time-tested wisdom in a way that you actually want to pay attention to it."

== Box office ==
Youngistaan opened to a "low" occupancy of 5–10% on the first day of its release across 1000 theatres in India with the other two releases of the day: Dishkiyaoon and O Teri.

According to exhibitor Rajesh Thadani, "Youngistaan raked in Rs 40 million during the first weekend." On its first Monday, the film saw a sharp decline in its gross collection earning in the range of 7.5 million, thus taking its domestic total up to a cumulative of 48.0 million at the box office. The film was a Box office bomb.

== Music ==
Youngistaan

Soundtrack album
- Genre: Feature film soundtrack
- Label: T-Series

Music was composed by Jeet Gannguli (Suno Na Sangemarmar, Suno Na Sangemarmar (Remix)), Sneha Khanwalkar (Tanki (Mika Version) and Tanki (Bhaven Version)), Shiraz Uppal (Daata Di Divaani, Mere Khuda), and Shree Isshq (Youngistaan Anthem, Youngistaan Anthem Remix) whilst the background score were composed by Salim–Sulaiman. Lyrics were penned by Sanamjeet, Syed Ahmad Afzal, Hard Kaur, Sneha Khanwalkar, Jackky Bhagnani, Kausar Munir and Sonny Ravan.

Track listing
No.	Title	Music	Artist(s)	Length
1.	"Suno Na Sangemarmar"	Jeet Gannguli	Arijit Singh	3:22
2.	"Mere Khuda"	Shiraz Uppal	Shiraz Uppal	4:09
3.	"Tanki" (Mika version)	Sneha Khanwalkar	Mika Singh, Bhavin Dhanak, Apeksha Dandekar, Sneha Khanwalkar	5:27
4.	"Daata Di Diwani (Qawwali)"	Shiraz Uppal	Rafaqat Ali Khan & Shiraz Uppal	5:00
5.	"Tanki" (Bhaven version)	Sneha Khanwalkar	Hard Kaur, Apeksha Dandekar & Sneha Khanwalkar	5:00
6.	"Youngistaan Anthem"	Shree Isshq	Shree D & Ishq Bector	4:45
7.	"Suno Na Sangemarmar" (remix)	Jeet Gannguli	Arijit Singh	5:23
8.	"Youngistaan Anthem" (remix)	Shree Isshq	Shree D & Ishq Bector	4:48

== Awards and nominations ==
Award	Category	Recipients and nominees	Result	Ref.
7th Mirchi Music Awards	Lyricist of The Year	Kausar Munir – "Suno Na Sangemarmar"	Nominated	
7th Mirchi Music Awards	Song representing Sufi tradition	"Daata Di Diwani (Qawwali)"	Nominated	

== Sequel ==
The makers have announced a sequel titled Youngistaan Dobara, which would narrate the story after Abhimanyu becomes prime minister.
