= Irshad Kamil =

Indian songwriter (born 1971)

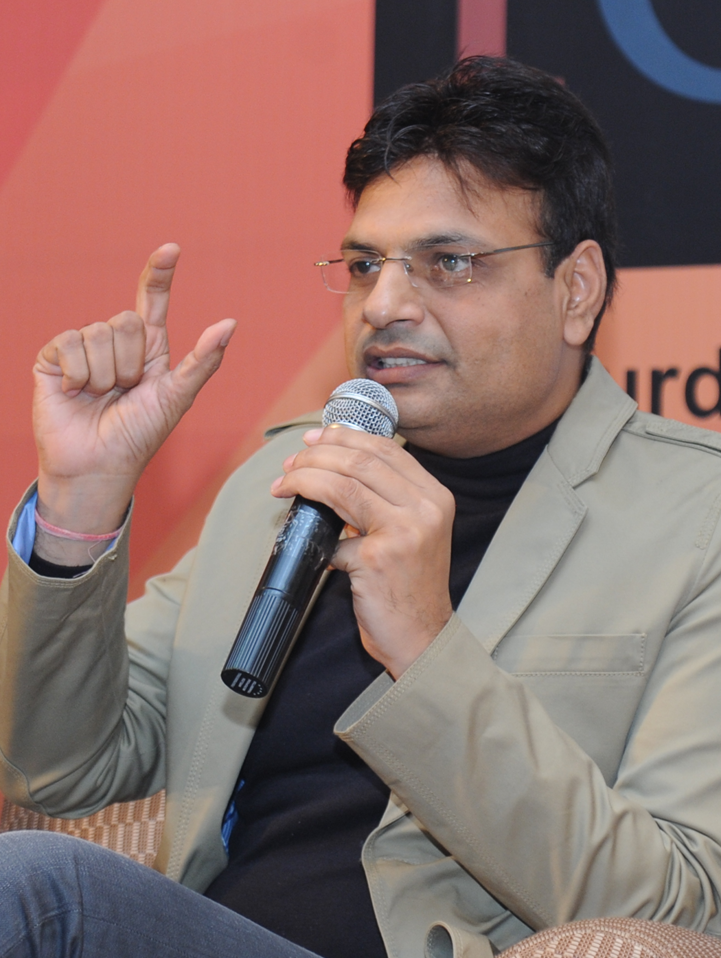
- Kamil at the Delhi Poetry Festival in 2013
- Born: 5 September 1971 (age 55); Malerkotla, Punjab, India
- Occupations: Lyricist; poet
- Years active: 2004–present
- Website: irshadkamil.com

Irshad Kamil (born 5 September 1971) is an Indian poet and lyricist. He has written songs in several successful films, including Jab We Met, Love Aaj Kal, Once Upon a Time in Mumbaai, Rockstar, Aashiqui 2, Raanjhanaa, Highway, Tamasha, Laila Majnu, Kabir Singh and Saiyaara.

== Early life and education ==
Kamil was born as the seventh child to his parents in Malerkotla, and belongs to a Punjabi Muslim family.

He studied journalism at the Panjab University, followed by postgraduate and PhD degrees in Hindi.

== Filmography ==
Denotes films that have not yet been released

Year	Title	Composer(s)	Notes	Ref.
2004	Chameli	Sandesh Shandilya		
2005	Shabd	Vishal–Shekhar		
2005	Socha Na Tha	Sandesh Shandilya	Five songs	
2005	Karam	Vishal–Shekhar	One song	
2005	Neal 'N' Nikki	Salim–Sulaiman	One song	
2006	Ahista Ahista	Himesh Reshammiya		
2006	Gafla	Kartik Shah		
2007	Dhol	Pritam	Five songs	
2007	Jab We Met	Pritam	Five songs	
2008	Tulsi	Nikhil-Vinay		
2008	Bhram	Pritam		
2008	Thodi Life Thoda Magic	Vinay Tiwari	Three songs	
2008	A Wednesday!	Sanjoy Chowdhury		
2009	Aa Dekhen Zara	Pritam	Three songs	
2009	Tera Mera Ki Rishta	Jaidev Kumar		
2009	Love Aaj Kal	Pritam		
2009	Toss	Sandesh Shandilya		
2009	Ajab Prem Ki Ghazab Kahani	Pritam		
2009	De Dana Dan	Pritam	Three songs	
2010	Atithi Tum Kab Jaoge?	Pritam	One song	
2010	Tum Milo Toh Sahi	Sandesh Shandilya		
2010	Raajneeti	Pritam	One song	
2010	Khatta Meetha	Pritam	Three songs (one along with U. R. L.)	
2010	Once Upon a Time in Mumbaai	Pritam	Six songs	
2010	Help	Ashutosh Phatak		
2010	Aashayein	Pritam	One song	
2010	We Are Family	Shankar–Ehsaan–Loy		
2010	Anjaana Anjaani	Vishal–Shekhar	One song (along with Kausar Munir)	
2010	Aakrosh	Pritam		
2010	Action Replayy	Pritam		
2011	Yamla Pagla Deewana	Sandesh Shandilya	One song	
2011	Kucch Luv Jaisaa	Pritam		
2011	Mere Brother Ki Dulhan	Sohail Sen		
2011	Mausam	Pritam		
2011	Rascals	Vishal–Shekhar		
2011	Rockstar	A. R. Rahman		
2011	Desi Boyz	Pritam	Two songs	
2012	Jodi Breakers	Salim–Sulaiman	One of the lyricists	
2012	Cocktail	Pritam; Yo Yo Honey Singh	Eight songs	
2012	Chakravyuh	Salim–Sulaiman; Shantanu Moitra		
2012	Son of Sardaar	Himesh Reshammiya; Sajid–Wajid		
2013	Special 26	M. M. Keeravani	Eight songs	
2013	Aashiqui 2	Jeet Gannguli	Six songs	
2013	Raanjhanaa	A. R. Rahman		
2013	Phata Poster Nikhla Hero	Pritam		
2014	Gunday	Sohail Sen	Eight songs	
2014	Highway	A. R. Rahman	Seven songs	
2014	Kochadaiiyaan (Dubbed version)	A. R. Rahman	Five songs	
2014	Kaanchi	Ismail Darbar; Salim–Sulaiman		
2014	Holiday: A Soldier Is Never Off Duty	Pritam	Five songs	
2014	Humpty Sharma Ki Dulhania	Sachin–Jigar	Two songs	
2014	Raja Natwarlal	Yuvan Shankar Raja		
2014	Happy New Year	Vishal–Shekhar		
2015	I (Dubbed version)	A. R. Rahman		
2015	Prem Ratan Dhan Payo	Himesh Reshammiya		
2015	Guddu Rangeela	Amit Trivedi		
2015	Tamasha	A. R. Rahman		
2016	Sultan	Vishal–Shekhar		
2016	Pink	Anupam Roy	One song	
2016	Madaari	Vishal Bhardwaj; Sunny Bawra-Inder Bawra		
2017	Sachin: A Billion Dreams	A. R. Rahman		
2017	Dear Maya	Anupam Roy; SandMan		
2017	Raabta	Pritam; JAM8	Wrote three songs (Two with Amitabh Bhattacharya)	
2017	Mom	A. R. Rahman	All songs (Two with Rianjali)	
2017	Jab Harry Met Sejal	Pritam, Diplo		
2017	Newton	Rachita Arora	Two songs	
2017	Tiger Zinda Hai	Vishal–Shekhar		
2018	Sanju	A. R. Rahman	Guest lyricist; Two songs	
2018	Fanney Khan	Amit Trivedi; Tanishk Bagchi	Five Songs	
2018	Rajma Chawal	Hitesh Sonik	Five Songs	
2018	Zero	Ajay-Atul; Tanishk Bagchi	Five Songs	
2018	Laila Majnu	Niladri Kumar; Joi Barua	Nine Songs	
2019	Bharat	Vishal–Shekhar	Nine Songs	
2019	Kabir Singh	Amaal Mallik; Vishal Mishra; Sachet–Parampara	Four songs	
2020	Love Aaj Kal	Pritam		
2020	Shikara	Sandesh Shandilya	Five Songs	
2021	Tadap	Pritam		
2021	Atrangi Re	A. R. Rahman		
2022	Raksha Bandhan	Himesh Reshammiya		
2022	Freddy	Pritam		
2023	Bholaa	Ravi Basrur		
2023	Jawan	Anirudh Ravichander	Guest lyricist; Two songs (One with Wasim Balrevi)	
2023	Tiger 3	Pritam	One song	
2023	Dunki	Pritam	Two songs	
2024	Woh Bhi Din The	Joi Barua	Eight songs	
2024	Bade Miyan Chote Miyan	Vishal Mishra	Five songs	
2024	Amar Singh Chamkila	A. R. Rahman		
2024	Vicky Vidya Ka Woh Wala Video	White Noise Collectives		
2024	Baby John	Thaman S		
2025	Sky Force	Tanishk Bagchi	Two songs	
2025	Chhaava	A. R. Rahman	Five songs	
2025	Kesari Chapter 2	Shashwat Sachdev, Kanishk Seth-Kavita Seth	Five songs	
2025	Ground Zero	Rohan-Rohan	One song	
2025	Bhool Chuk Maaf	Tanishk Bagchi	Five songs	
2025	Saiyaara	Tanishk Bagchi; Faheem Abdullah; Arslan Nizami; Sachet-Parampara	Twelve songs (One with Prashant Pandey)	
2025	Tehran	Tanishk Bagchi		
2025	Tere Ishk Mein	A. R. Rahman	Eight songs	
2025	Dhurandhar	Shashwat Sachdev	Three songs	
2026	Dhurandhar: The Revenge	Shashwat Sachdev	4 songs	
2026	Krishnavataram Part 1: The Heart (Hridayam)			
2026	Naye Naye Taare	Sanjivv Anand Jha	Short film on YouTube	
2026	Main Vaapas Aaunga	A. R. Rahman		

== Awards and nominations ==
=== Filmfare Awards ===
Year	Category	Film	Song	Result	Note
2010	Best Lyricist	Love Aaj Kal	"Aaj Din Chadheya"	Won	
2012	Best Lyricist	Rockstar	"Nadaan Parinde"	Won	
2015	Best Lyricist	Tamasha	"Agar Tum Sath Ho"	Won	

=== Mirchi Music Awards ===
Year	Category	Film	Song	Result	Note
2010	Album of the Year	Once Upon A Time In Mumbaai	-	Nominated	
2011	Lyricist of the Year	Rockstar	"Nadaan Parinde"	Nominated	
2011	Listeners' Choice Album of the Year	Rockstar	-	Won	
2011	Album of the Year	Rockstar	-	Won	
2012	Album of the Year	Cocktail	-	Nominated	
2013	Album of the Year	Aashiqui 2	-	Won	
2014	Album of the Year	Gunday	-	Nominated	
2014	Lyricist of the Year	Happy New Year	"Manwa Laage"	Won	
2015	Lyricist of the Year	Tamasha	"Agar Tum Saath Ho"	Nominated	
2016	Album of the Year	Sultan	-	Nominated	
2016	Lyricist of the Year	Sultan	"Jag Ghoomeya"	Nominated	
2017	Album of the Year	Raabta	-	Nominated	
2017	Album of the Year	Tiger Zinda Hai	-	Nominated	
2017	Album of the Year	Jab Harry Met Sejal	-	Won	
2017	Lyricist of the Year	Jab Harry Met Sejal	"Hawayein"	Won	
2017	Lyricist of the Year	Jab Harry Met Sejal	"Safar"	Nominated	

=== Other awards ===
Year	Award	Category	Film	Song	Result	Note
2019	Bazm-E-Urdu Dubai's Mehfil-E-Urdu	Kaifi Azmi Award for Urdu Lyricist			Won	
