= Manwa Laage =

2014 Hindi song

Song by Vishal–Shekhar, Shreya Ghoshal and Arijit Singh

from the album Happy New Year
- Language: Hindi
- English title: "My Heart Feels This"
- Released: 11 September 2014
- Genre: Filmi
- Length: 4:31
- Label: T-Series
- Composer: Vishal–Shekhar
- Lyricist: Irshad Kamil
- Producer: Vishal–Shekhar

Music video
- "Manwa Laage" on YouTube

"Manwa Laage" (transl. My heart feels this) is a romantic Hindi song from the 2014 Hindi film, Happy New Year. Composed by Vishal–Shekhar, the song is sung by Shreya Ghoshal and Arijit Singh, with lyrics penned by Irshad Kamil. The music video of the track features actors Shahrukh Khan and Deepika Padukone.

== Development ==
On 26 November 2012, director Farah Khan confirmed through Twitter that the first song from Happy New Year had been recorded and it is rendered by Shreya Ghoshal and Arijit Singh. Till then, it was the first time that Singh lent his voice for Shah Rukh Khan, as the song was recorded prior to "Kashmir Main Tu Kanyakumari" (Chennai Express).

== Other versions ==
Language	Song	Singers	Lyricists
Tamil	Maname Va Va	Neeti Mohan, Vijay Prakash	Pa. Vijay
Telugu	Manase Laage	Neeti Mohan, Vijay Prakash	Rakendu Mouli

== Release ==
The video was officially praised by many and left a great impact after the music video of the song was officially released on 9 September 2014, through the YouTube channel of T-Series said MAhluwalia of Caetio. Along with leading actors Shah Rukh Khan and Deepika Padukone, the video also featured the other cast− Abhishek Bachchan, Sonu Sood, Boman Irani, Vivaan Shah. The full song was later released on music-streaming platforms on 11 September 2014.

== Critical reception ==
The song received generally positive reviews from critics. Rohit Vats reviewing for Hindustan Times described the song "simple yet soulful", praising the lyrics by Irshad Kamil. Rajiv Vijayakar from Bollywood Hungama complimented Shreya Ghoshal's rendition in the song stating "Shreya is in customary excellent form and is superlative and more" though criticised "loud, synthetic backing music". Surabhi Redkar from Koimoi stated "While Shreya Ghoshal's voice brings out the mush in you, there is also the soulful voice of Arijit Singh to give you the perfect recipe for a romantic song", and picked the song as one of the best tracks from the album. Joginder Tuteja reviewing from Rediff.com felt that the song " is a catchy number and will enjoy a good shelf life", acknowledging Ghoshal and Singh's vocals with Vishal–Shekhar composition and Kamil's lyrics.

== Accolades ==
Award (2015)	Category	Nominee	Result	Ref
Guild Awards	Best Female Playback Singer	Shreya Ghoshal	Nominated	
21st Annual Life OK Screen Awards	Best Choreography	Farah Khan and Geeta Kapoor	Nominated	
60th Filmfare Awards	Best Female Playback Singer	Shreya Ghoshal	Nominated	
Global Indian Music Academy Awards	Best Duet	Shreya Ghoshal and Arijit Singh	Nominated	
7th Mirchi Music Awards	Lyricist of the Year	Irshad Kamil	Won	
7th Mirchi Music Awards	Sound Engineering of the Year	Satchith Harve, Abhishek Ghatak, Murali	Won	
7th Mirchi Music Awards	Song of the Year	Vishal–Shekhar	Nominated	
7th Mirchi Music Awards	Music Composer of the Year	Vishal–Shekhar	Nominated	
7th Mirchi Music Awards	Male Vocalist of the Year	Arijit Singh	Nominated	
7th Mirchi Music Awards	Female Vocalist of the Year	Shreya Ghoshal	Nominated	
7th Mirchi Music Awards	Programmer and Arranger of the Year	Jackie V	Nominated	
