= Mirchi Music Award for Upcoming Lyricist of The Year =

Indian film music award

- Awarded for: Best contribution by a new lyricist
- Country: India
- Presented by: Radio Mirchi
- First award: Ashok Mishra for all songs of Welcome to Sajjanpur (2008 (1st))
- Currently held by: Manan Bhardwaj for "Kashmir" from Animal (2024 (16th))
- Website: Music Mirchi Awards Official Website

The Mirchi Music Award for Upcoming Lyricist of the Year is given by Radio Mirchi as a part of its annual Mirchi Music Awards for Hindi films, to recognise an upcoming lyricist for contributing in a film song. The award ceremony was started in 2008 to honour the best of Hindi film music. Ashok Mishra was the winner in that award ceremony for the film Welcome to Sajjanpur.

== Winners and nominees ==
In the following table, the years are listed as per presenter's convention, and generally correspond to the year of film release in India. The ceremonies are always held the following year.

(Winners are listed first, highlighted in boldface.)

=== 2000s ===
Year	Nominees	Song	Film	Ref.
**2008** **(1st)**	**Ashok Mishra**	**All songs**	**Welcome to Sajjanpur**	
**2009** **(2nd)**	**Amitabh Bhattacharya**	**"Emosanal Attyachar (Brass Band Version)"**	**Dev.D**	

=== 2010s ===
Year	Nominees	Song	Film	Ref.
**2010** **(3rd)**	**Bhadwai Village Mandali**	**"Mehngai Dayain"**	**Peepli Live**	
**2010** **(3rd)**	Late Jagdish Joshi and Vibhu Puri	"Keh Na Sakoon"	Guzaarish	
**2010** **(3rd)**	Noon Meem Rashid	"Chola Maati Ke Ram"	Peepli Live	
**2010** **(3rd)**	Shakeel Sohail	"Rabba"	Aashayein	
**2010** **(3rd)**	Vibhu Puri	"Sau Gram Zindagi"	Guzaarish	
**2011** **(4th)**	**Seema Saini**	**"Sheet Leher"**	**Lanka**	
**2011** **(4th)**	Akshat Verma	"I Hate You (Like I Love You)"	Delhi Belly	
**2011** **(4th)**	Amol Gupte	"Life Bahot Simple Hai"	Stanley Ka Dabba	
**2011** **(4th)**	Imran Raza	"Hona Tha Pyar"	Bol	
**2011** **(4th)**	Priya Panchal	"Baat Jo Thi…(Yeh Dooriyan)"	Yeh Dooriyaan	
**2012** **(5th)**	**Rochak Kohli and Ayushmann Khurrana**	**"Pani Da Rang (Male)"**	**Vicky Donor**	
**2012** **(5th)**	Arko Pravo Mukherjee and Manish Makhija	"Abhi Abhi"	Jism 2	
**2012** **(5th)**	Habib Faisal	"Chokra Jawaan"	Ishaqzaade	
**2012** **(5th)**	Sanjay Masoomm	"Rab Ka Shukrana"	Jannat 2	
**2012** **(5th)**	Sanjay Masoomm	"Tera Deedar Hua (From The Heart)"	Jannat 2	
**2013** **(6th)**	**Siddharth-Garima**	**"Laal Ishq"**	**Goliyon Ki Rasleela Ram-Leela**	
**2014** **(7th)**	**Rashmi Singh**	**"Muskurane"**	**CityLights**	
**2014** **(7th)**	Faraaz Ahmed	"Arziyaan"	Jigariyaa	
**2014** **(7th)**	Manoj Yadav	"Pakeezah"	Ungli	
**2014** **(7th)**	Rabbi Ahmad and Adnan Dhool (Soch)	"Awari"	Ek Villain	
**2014** **(7th)**	Raghu Nath	"Ranjha (Queen)"	Queen	
**2015** **(8th)**	**Abhendra Kumar Upadhyay**	**"Tu Hai Ki Nahi"**	**Roy**	
**2015** **(8th)**	Abhendra Kumar Upadhyay	"Boond Boond"	Roy	
**2015** **(8th)**	Kunaal Vermaa	"Hasi (Male)"	Hamari Adhuri Kahani	
**2015** **(8th)**	Neeraj Rajawat	"Maati Ka Palang"	NH10	
**2015** **(8th)**	Vayu	"Banno"	Tanu Weds Manu: Returns	
**2016** **(9th)**	**Abhiruchi Chand**	**"Buddhu Sa Mann"**	**Kapoor & Sons**	
**2016** **(9th)**	Aditya Sharma	"Raatein"	Shivaay	
**2016** **(9th)**	Deepak Ramola and Gurpreet Saini	"Atrangi Yaar"	Wazir	
**2016** **(9th)**	Raj Ranjodh	"Chal Utth Bandeya"	Do Lafzon Ki Kahani	
**2016** **(9th)**	Shreyas Jain	"Maa"	Nil Battey Sannata	
**2017** **(10th)**	**Santanu Ghatak**	**"Rafu"**	**Tumhari Sulu**	
**2017** **(10th)**	Adheesh Verma	"Meer-E-Kaarwan"	Lucknow Central	
**2017** **(10th)**	Kumar Vijay	"Sawan Ban Aay Gayo Badra"	JD	
**2017** **(10th)**	Raghav Dutt	"Meherbaan"	Thodi Thodi Si Manmaaniyan	
**2017** **(10th)**	Sidhant Mago	"Khidki"	Rukh	
**2017** **(10th)**	Sumant Vadhera	"Pal"	Monsoon Shootout	
**2018** **(11th)**	**Prateek Kuhad**	**"Kadam"**	**Karwaan**	
**2018** **(11th)**	Prateek Kuhad	"Saansein"	Karwaan	
**2018** **(11th)**	Abhijat Joshi and Rohan Gokhale	"Baba Bolta Hain Bas Ho Gaya"	Sanju	
**2018** **(11th)**	Jamil Ahmed	"Adhura Lafz"	Baazaar	

=== 2020s ===
Year	Nominees	Song	Film	Ref.
**2024** **(16th)**	**Manan Bhardwaj**	**Kashmir**	**Animal**	

== See also ==
- Mirchi Music Awards
- Bollywood
- Cinema of India
