= Mirchi Music Award for Album of The Year =

Annual Hindi music award

The Mirchi Music Award for Album of The Year is given yearly by Radio Mirchi as a part of its annual Mirchi Music Awards for Hindi films, to recognise the best song of that year.

== List of winners ==
- 2009 Jaane Tu... Ya Jaane Na – A.R Rahman, Abbas Tyrewala
  - Dostana – Vishal–Shekhar, Anvita Dutt Guptan, Kumaar, Vishal Dadlani
  - Ghajini – A.R Rahman, Prasoon Joshi
  - Jodha Akbar – A.R Rahman, Javed Akhtar
  - Rock On!! – Shankar–Ehsaan–Loy, Javed Akhtar
- 2010 Delhi-6 – A.R Rahman, Prasoon Joshi
  - Kaminey – Vishal Bhardwaj, Gulzar
  - Love Aaj Kal – Pritam, Irshad Kamil
  - Slumdog Millionaire – A.R Rahman, Gulzar, Raquib Alam
  - Ajab Prem Ki Ghazab Kahani – Pritam, Irshad Kamil, Ashish Pandit
- 2011 Dabangg – Sajid–Wajid, Lalit Pandit, Faiz Anwar, Jalees Sherwani
  - My Name is Khan – Shankar–Ehsaan–Loy, Niranjan Iyengar
  - Ishqiya – Vishal Bhardwaj, Gulzar
  - Once Upon A Time In Mumbaai – Pritam, Irshad Kamil, Neelesh Misra, Amitabh Bhattacharya
  - Break Ke Baad – Vishal–Shekhar, Prasoon Joshi
- 2012 Rockstar – A.R Rahman, Irshad Kamil
  - Zindagi Na Milegi Dobara – Shankar–Ehsaan–Loy, Javed Akhtar
  - Ra.One – Vishal–Shekhar, Atahar Panchi, Vishal Dadlani, Kumaar
  - The Dirty Picture – Vishal–Shekhar, Rajat Arora
  - Bodyguard – Himesh Reshammiya, Pritam, Neelesh Misra, Shabbir Ahmed
- 2013 Agneepath – Ajay–Atul, Amitabh Bhattacharya
  - Barfi! – Pritam, Ashish Pandit, Sayeed Quadri, Swanand Kirkire, Neelesh Misra, Amitabh Bhattacharya
  - Cocktail – Pritam, Irshad Kamil, Amitabh Bhattacharya
  - Ishaqzaade – Amit Trivedi, Kausar Munir
  - Student of the Year – Vishal–Shekhar, Anvita Dutt Guptan
- 2014 Aashiqui 2 – Mithoon, Jeet Gannguli, Ankit Tiwari, Sandeep Nath, Irshad Kamil, Sanjay Masoomm
  - Yeh Jawaani Hai Deewani – Pritam, Amitabh Bhattacharya
  - Bhaag Milkha Bhaag – Shankar–Ehsaan–Loy, Javed Akhtar
  - Ram-Leela – Sanjay Leela Bhansali, Siddharth–Garima
  - Raanjhanaa – A.R Rahman, Irshad Kamil
- 2015 2 States – Shankar–Ehsaan–Loy, Amitabh Bhattacharya
  - Queen – Amit Trivedi, Anvita, Verma Malik, Raghu Nath
  - Gunday – Sohail Sen, Irshad Kamil, Ali Abbas Zafar, Bappi Lahiri, Gautam Susmit
  - Ek Villain – Mithoon, Ankit Tiwari, Rabbi Ahmad, Adnaan Dhool, Manoj Muntashir, Rabbi Ahmad, Adnan Dhool
  - CityLights – Jeet Gannguli, Rashmi Singh
- 2016 Bajirao Mastani – Sanjay Leela Bhansali, Siddharth–Garima, A. M. Turaz, Nasir Faraaz, Prashant Ingole
  - Roy – Amaal Mallik, Ankit Tiwari, Meet Bros Anjjan, Kumaar, Abhendra Kumar Upadhyay, Sandeep Nath
  - Dil Dhadakne Do – Shankar–Ehsaan–Loy, Javed Akhtar
  - Badlapur – Sachin–Jigar, Dinesh Vijan, Priya Saraiya
  - ABCD 2 – Sachin–Jigar, Mayur Puri, Priya Saraiya
- 2017 Ae Dil Hai Mushkil – Pritam, Amitabh Bhattacharya
  - Dangal – Pritam, Amitabh Bhattacharya
  - Udta Punjab – Amit Trivedi, Shiv Kumar Batalvi, Shellee, Varun Grover
  - Sultan – Vishal–Shekhar, Irshad Kamil
  - Kapoor & Sons – Amaal Mallik, Arko Pravo Mukherjee, Nucleya, Tanishk Bagchi
- 2018 Jab Harry Met Sejal – Pritam, Irshad Kamil
  - Tiger Zinda Hai – Vishal–Shekhar, Irshad Kamil
  - Secret Superstar – Amit Trivedi, Kausar Munir
  - Raabta – Pritam, JAM8, Irshad Kamil, Amitabh Bhattacharya, Kumaar
  - Jagga Jasoos – Pritam, Amitabh Bhattacharya, Neelesh Misra
- 2019 Padmaavat – Sanjay Leela Bhansali, A. M. Turaz, Siddharth-Garima, Swaroop Khan
  - Sonu Ke Titu Ki Sweety – Amaal Mallik, Guru Randhawa, Rajat Nagpal, Rochak Kohli, Saurabh-Vaibhav, Yo Yo Honey Singh, Kumaar, Swapnil Tiwari
  - Raazi – Shankar–Ehsaan–Loy, Gulzar, Allama Iqbal
  - Manmarziyaan – Amit Trivedi, Shellee & Sikander Kahlon
  - Kedarnath – Amit Trivedi, Amitabh Bhattacharya
- 2020 Kesari – Arko Pravo Mukherjee, Chirrantan Bhatt, Gurmoh, Jasbir Jassi, Jasleen Royal, Tanishk Bagchi, Kumaar, Kunwar Juneja, Manoj Muntashir
  - Bharat – Vishal–Shekhar, Ali Abbas Zafar, Julius Packiam, Irshad Kamil
  - Gully Boy – Ankur Tewari, Divine, Dub Sharma, Ishq Bector, Jasleen Royal, Ace aka Mumbai, Chandrashekar Kunder (Major C), Hardeep, Kaam Bhaari, Karsh Kale, Midival Punditz, Mikey McCleary, Naezy, Prem, Sez on the Beat, Raghu Dixit, Rishi Rich, Spitfire & Viveick Rajagopalan, Javed Akhtar, 100 RBH, Aditya Sharma, Arjun, Bhinder Khanpuri, Blitz, Desi Ma, Gaurav Raina, Maharya, MC Altaf, MC TodFod, MC Mawali, Noxious D, Tapan Raj, D-Cypher, BeatRaw
  - Kabir Singh – Akhil Sachdeva, Amaal Mallik, Mithoon, Sachet–Parampara & Vishal Mishra, Irshad Kamil, Kumaar, Manoj Muntashir
  - Kalank – Pritam, Amitabh Bhattacharya
- 2021 Rockstar (Album of the Decade)
- 2022 Shershaah – Asees Kaur, B Praak, Darshan Raval, Jasleen Royal, Jubin Nautiyal, Palak Muchhal, Vikram Montrose, Jasleen Royal, Javed-Mohsin, Tanishk Bagchi, Anvita Dutt, Jaani, Manoj Muntashir, Rashmi Virag
  - Atrangi Re – AR Rahman, Irshad Kamil, Arijit Singh, Dhanush, Daler Mehndi, Haricharan, Hiral Viradia, Shashaa Tirupati, Shreya Ghoshal, Rashid Ali (Adtnl: Mayank Kapri, Himanshu Sharma, Varun Uday, Nisa Shetty & Pooja Tiwari)
  - Dil Bechara – AR Rahman, Amitabh Bhattacharya, (Rap: Rajakumari), Aditya Narayan, Arijit Singh, Hriday Gattani, Jonita Gandhi, Mohit Chauhan, Poorvi Koutish, Sanaa Moussa, Shashaa Tirupati, Shreya Ghoshal, Sunidhi Chauhan
  - Love Aaj Kal 2 – Pritam, Irshad Kamil, Antara Mitra, Arijit Singh, Akasa Singh, Darshan Raval, KK, Madhubanti Baghchi, Mohit Chauhan, Nikhita Gandhi, Raftaar, Shashwat Singh, Shilpa Rao
  - Malang – Adnan Dhool, Ankit Tiwari, Arijit Singh, Asees Kaur, Hadiya Hashmi, Mithoon, Sachet Tandon, Ved Sharma, Rabi Ahmed, The Fusion Project, Harsh Limbachiyaa, Kunaal Vermaa, Prince Dubey, Sayeed Quadri
- 2023 Laal Singh Chaddha – Arijit Singh, Altamash Faridi, Mohan Kannan, Romy, Shadab Faridi, Shilpa Rao, Sonu Nigam, Pritam, Amitabh Bhattacharya
  - Gangubai Kathiawadi – Aditi Prabhudesai, Archana Gore, Arijit Singh, Dipti Rege, Jahnvi Shrimankar, Neeti Mohan, Shail Hada, Shreya Ghoshal, Tarannum M Jain, Sanjay Leela Bhansali, A. M. Turaz, Kumaar, Bhojak Ashok 'Anjam'
  - Brahmāstra: Part One – Shiva – Antara Mitra, Arijit Singh, Javed Ali, Jonita Gandhi, Shashwat Singh, Shreya Ghoshal, Slow Cheetah, Tushar Joshi, Pritam, Amitabh Bhattacharya
  - RRR(Hindi) – Amit Trivedi, Benny Dayal, Chandana Bala Kalyan, Charu Hariharan, Harika Narayan, Kaala Bhairava, M. M. Keeravaani, Raag Patel, Rahul Sipligunj, Sahithi Chaganti, Vijay Prakash, Vishal Mishra, K Shiva Dutta, Riya Mukherjee, Varun Grover
  - Qala – Shahid Mallya, Sireesha Bhagavatula, Swanand Kirkire, Amit Trivedi, Amitabh Bhattacharya, Anvitaa Dutt, Kausar Munir, Varun Grover, Sant Kabir
- 2024 Tu Jhoothi Main Makkaar – Arijit Singh, Charan, Divya Kumar, Jubin Nautiyal, Nikhita Gandhi, Shashwat Singh, Sunidhi Chauhan, Shreya Ghoshal, Pritam, Amitabh Bhattacharya
  - Animal
  - Jawan
  - Rocky Aur Rani Kii Prem Kahaani
  - Zara Hatke Zara Bachke

== See also ==
- Mirchi Music Awards
- Bollywood
- Cinema of India
