= Muskurane =

2014 Hindi song

- Picture sleeve with actors Rajkummar Rao and Patralekha

Single by Arijit Singh

from the album CityLights
- Language: Hindi
- Released: 1 May 2014
- Genre: Filmi
- Length: 5:34
- Label: Sony Music India
- Composer: Jeet Gannguli
- Lyricist: Rashmi Singh
- Producer: Mukesh Bhatt

Music video
- "Muskurane - Romantic" on YouTube

Muskurane (transl. Smile) is a romantic song from the 2014 film, CityLights. Composed by Jeet Gannguli, the song is sung by Arijit Singh, with lyrics penned by Rashmi Singh. The music video of the track features actors Rajkummar Rao, Patralekha and Arijit Singh.

== Background ==
The song was composed by Jeet Gannguli with lyrics written by Rashmi Singh. The song was the last composed track from the album. The producer of the song Mukesh Bhatt wanted an 'easy to hum but with depth' melodic song. It was, Ganguly's wife Chandrani who found the composition 'fantastic' while Ganguly was strumming his guitar. Immediately, he called Bhatt and played the 'mukhda' to him which he liked instantly. The following day, Ganguly composed the 'antara' of the song and played it to Bhatt and director of the film Hansal Mehta, which they loved on hearing.

Rashmi Singh wrote the opening lines of the song in a few hours. According to Ganguly "Citylights is not a teenage love story, it's about a couple whose love has depth and character. Rashmi's lyrics are simple, heartfelt and conversational". The song was recorded at Phatbox Studio, Mumbai, at night. The song was recorded in two to three hours.

The song is a guitar-based song which fuse a Bengali folk idiom with modern music in a Sufism touch. Piano was dominantly used in composition of the song with additional use of Violin in the first antara and Esraj in the second antara.

== Release and success ==
The song was released in Indian Television show Beintehaa which airs on Colors TV, before releasing it on any music channel. It was released on 2 May 2014. The video of the song was officially released on the same day through the YouTube channel of Sony Music India. The video features Arijit Singh as well as select scenes from the film. The full song was also released as a single, the same day.

During the released days, the song was positioned in many charts, and was one of the most downloaded songs during that time.

== Critical reception ==
The song received positive response from the critics.

Rajiv Vijayakar from Bollywood Hungama praised Singh's rendition in the song for bringing the right haunting tenor and right emotion in the song. Priya Adivarekar reviewing from Indian Express complimented vocals in the song and further stated "The melody is soothing and Rashmi's poetic lyrics perfectly suit the brilliantly-composed romantic track". Joginder Tuteja reviewing for Rediff.com described the song as "lyrical and poetic with a lot of fluidity".

== Unplugged Version ==
An unplugged version of the song was included in the soundtrack, composed and written by Jeet Gannguli and Rashmi Singh respectively. The song is sung by Mohammad Irfan Ali. The song was released along with other tracks in the soundtrack of the album on 9 May 2014.

=== Background ===
Director of the film, Hansal Mehta wanted to incorporate two versions of the song. The romantic version being sung by Arijit Singh, the composer of the song Jeet Ganguly picked Mohammad Irfan Ali to sing the unplugged version. The song was recorded at Phatbox Studio, Mumbai. The song was recorded in two to three hours.

The lyrics of the song was slightly changed, when compared to the original song. Piano and Violin were used in the composition unlike the version rendered by Singh which used Esraj in the second antara.

=== Critical reception ===
Joginder Tuteja reviewing for Rediff.com felt the version is "equally enjoyable" as of the original. Rajiv Vijayakar from Bollywood Hungama felt this version lacks the 'vital small nuances' in the vocals which make the crucial difference compared to the romantic version of the song, though Priya Adivarekar reviewing from Indian Express felt the version of the song is "also good".

== Live performances ==
Arijit Singh performed the song "Muskurane" in many of his concerts.

On 29 November 2014, Singh performed the song in The Times of India presented "NOBO – Atif Aslam & Arijit Singh Live in Concert" held in Gurgaon. Singh also performed the song live during his "Tum Hi Ho Live Concert" on 9 August 2014 at the San Jose State University Event Center and on 10 August at the Orpheum Theatre in downtown Los Angeles.

== Accolades ==
Year	Award	Category	Nominee	Result	Ref
2014	Stardust Awards	Best Male Playback Singer	Arijit Singh	Nominated	
2014	Stardust Awards	Best Lyricist	Rashmi Singh	Nominated	
2014	BIG Star Entertainment Awards	Most Entertaining Singer (Male)	Arijit Singh	Nominated	
2015	10th Renault Star Guild Awards	Best lyricist	Rashmi Singh	Nominated	
2015	21st Annual Life OK Screen Awards	Best Male Playback Singer	Arijit Singh	Won	
2015	21st Annual Life OK Screen Awards	Best Lyricist	Rashmi Singh	Nominated	
2015	60th Britannia Filmfare Awards	Best Lyricist	Rashmi Singh	Won	
2015	Global Indian Music Academy Awards	Best Male Playback Singer	Arijit Singh	Won	
2015	7th Mirchi Music Awards	Song of the Year	Jeet Gannguli	Nominated	
2015	7th Mirchi Music Awards	Music Composer of the Year	Jeet Gannguli	Nominated	
2015	7th Mirchi Music Awards	Male Vocalist of the Year	Arijit Singh	Nominated	
2015	7th Mirchi Music Awards	Lyricist of the Year	Rashmi Singh	Nominated	
2015	7th Mirchi Music Awards	Upcoming Lyricist of the Year	Rashmi Singh	Won	
2015	7th Mirchi Music Awards	Song of the Year (Listener's Choice)	Jeet Gannguli	Won	
2015	IIFA Awards	Best Male Playback Singer	Arijit Singh	Nominated	
2015	IIFA Awards	Best Lyricist	Rashmi Singh	Nominated	
