= CityLights (2014 film) =

2014 film by Hansal Mehta

- Theatrical release poster
- Directed by: Hansal Mehta
- Screenplay by: Ritesh Shah
- Based on: Metro Manila by Sean Ellis
- Produced by: Mukesh Bhatt
- Starring: Rajkummar Rao; Patralekha
- Cinematography: Dev Agarwal
- Edited by: Apurva Asrani
- Music by: Songs: Jeet Gannguli; Background score: Raju Singh
- Production company: Vishesh Films
- Distributed by: Fox Star Studios
- Release date: 30 May 2014
- Running time: 119 minutes
- Country: India
- Languages: Hindi; Rajasthani

CityLights is a 2014 Indian drama film directed by Hansal Mehta, starring Rajkummar Rao and actress Patralekha in the lead roles. It is a remake of the BAFTA-nominated British film Metro Manila (2013). The film was presented by Fox Star Studios in association with Mahesh Bhatt and Mukesh Bhatt.

The story is about a poor farmer from Rajasthan coming to Mumbai in search of a livelihood. The film was released on 30 May 2014, and won rave reviews from most critics. In spite of releasing on just 350 screens, CityLights became a success due to its low cost of production and consistent collections at the box office.

== Plot ==
Deepak Singh's (played by Rajkumar Rao) life as a former driver in the Indian Army in a village in Rajasthan who owns a garment store is tangled in the web of poverty, hope, and despair. Deepak's family consists of his ever-supporting wife, Rakhi (played by Patralekha), and their little daughter, Mahi. They tag along on his journey to Mumbai as he is unable to repay the money he owes for his store. With no contacts or addresses, except that of his friend Omkar, Deepak takes extreme measures to search for him when arriving in Mumbai.

Deepak is tricked by two conmen who offer to sell him a flat for Rs 10,000 and decamp with the money. With no details on them, the Mumbai police refuse to file an FIR. His wife meets an escort working at a nightclub, who provides them with temporary accommodation in a building and convinces her to work as a bar dancer until Deepak finds a job.

Deepak gets hired as a driver for a privately owned security bureau with a monthly pay of Rs 15,000. Deepak's senior colleague, Vishnu (played by Manav Kaul), realizes that he is gullible and does various favours for him to gain his trust. Vishnu later reveals a plan to loot a parcel being transported by the security agency. When Deepak vehemently opposes the idea of the theft, Vishnu blackmails him by revealing that he has hidden a box that he previously stole in Deepak's house. Feeling cornered, Deepak agrees to the risky plan of stealing the keys for this box. However, Vishnu is attacked and killed in the course of the robbery. Meanwhile, Rakhi loses her job. Deepak finds the box stolen by his senior in his house and comes up with a plan to ensure Rakhi and Mahi's safe return to their village.

The movie ends when his attempt to steal the keys from the agency cost him his life, but through a shrewd tactic, he is able to pass on Rakhi the imprint of the key for the stolen box. Rakhi and Mahi return to the village with Rakhi lost in memory of Deepak and their happy past.

== Cast ==
- Rajkummar Rao as Deepak Singh
- Patralekha as Rakhi Deepak Singh
- Manav Kaul as Vishnu
- Sadiya Siddiqui as Sudha
- Pramod Pathak as Boss Mhatre
- Khushboo Upadhyay as Sonali
- Resh Lamba as Waqar
- Vaibhavi Upadhyay as Mahi Singh: Deepak and Rakhi's daughter

== Production ==
CityLights marked actress Anwita Paul's debut, known by her screen name Patralekha. As Paul was in a relationship with the lead actor Rao, the production house did not disclose her name until the trailer was released. When press kept questioning about the lead actress, the filmmakers dismissed the question.

While the film was originally set to be directed by Ajay Bahl, due to creative differences he was replaced by Hansal Mehta. In December 2013, it was announced that shooting would begin in Rajasthan.

The film was first scheduled to release on 1 May 2014, which was subsequently shifted to 30 May. On 5 May 26 minutes of footage was previewed at a Mumbai event.

== Soundtrack ==
The songs were composed by Jeet Gannguli with lyrics by Rashmi Singh. Rashmi Singh received Best Lyricist award at the 60th Filmfare Awards for her lyrics to the song "Muskurane."

The film score was composed by Raju Singh.

== Critical reception ==
Saurabh Dwivedi of India Today gave the film 5 out of 5 stars, and wrote, "The film lays bare the darkness beneath shining lights of the metropolis, with its gut-wrenching screenplay. Rajkummar Rao proves it yet again why Mahesh Bhatt thinks he is the future of Bollywood."

Director Suparn Verma, writing for Rediff rated the film 4/5, and wrote, "What makes City Lights memorable is how Hansal Mehta infuses his struggle into it. I have known Hansal for a better part of my life; we have seen both good days and bad. In this film, he gathers all his pain, pours it in a glass and makes Rajkummar drink it." Kusumita Das of Deccan Chronicle also gave the film 4 out of 5 stars and wrote, "Given its premise, some might say it’s old wine in a new bottle. But this bottle’s certainly a keeper.

Sweta Kaushal wrote in a Hindustan Times review that Hansal Mehta's direction makes Citylights "intensely gripping and thought-provoking, the interplay of emotions and how the couple copes with city's hardships are the high points of the film." Renowned critic Anupama Chopra, also writing for the Hindustan Times, gave the film 3/5 stars, and wrote, "The moving story about the horrors an immigrant family endures in the big city, translates perfectly to India and director Hansal Mehta stays faithful to the original"

Shubhra Gupta of The Indian Express rated the film 3/5 and wrote, "Mehta does well with generating dread and creating a couple of surprising curves, which almost overcomes some of the plot’s uneven arcs". India Today critic Rohit Khilnani also gave the film 3 out of 5 stars, and wrote, "Citylights is a very important film, it gives us a reality check. Mumbai is known to be the city of dreams but it does have a big share of shattered dreams too."

== Box office ==
The film collected ₹90 million (US$930,000) against a similar production budget.

== Awards and nominations ==
Award	Category	Recipients and nominees	Result	Ref.
7th Mirchi Music Awards	Song of The Year	"Muskurane"	Nominated	
7th Mirchi Music Awards	Album of The Year	Jeet Gannguli, Rashmi Singh	Nominated	
7th Mirchi Music Awards	Male Vocalist of The Year	Arijit Singh – "Muskurane"	Nominated	
7th Mirchi Music Awards	Music Composer of The Year	Jeet Gannguli – "Muskurane"	Nominated	
7th Mirchi Music Awards	Lyricist of The Year	Rashmi Singh – "Muskurane"	Nominated	
7th Mirchi Music Awards	Upcoming Lyricist of The Year	Rashmi Singh – "Muskurane"	Won	
7th Mirchi Music Awards	Raag-Inspired Song of the Year	"Soney Do"	Won	
7th Mirchi Music Awards	Listeners' Choice Song of the Year	"Muskurane"	Won	
