= Rashmi Virag =

Indian duo lyricist

- Occupations: Lyricist; writer; director
- Years active: 2014—present
- Known for: Main Rahoon Ya Na Rahoon
- Notable work: Muskurane

Rashmi Virag is the screen name of Rashmi Singh and Virag Mishra, an Indian lyricist duo active in Bollywood. At first, Singh and Mishra wrote lyrics themselves; in 2015, they began working as a duo. Singh won the Best Lyricist award at the 60th Filmfare Awards for the song "Muskurane" from the film CityLights.

Virag also wrote and directed a short film named Neelofar in 2017, starring Satish Kaushik and Harsh Vardhan Deo.

== Rashmi Virag as Lyricist ==
=== Filmography ===
Denotes films that have not yet been released

Year	Films	Songs	Composers
2015	Hamari Adhuri Kahani	"Hamari Adhuri Kahani" (Title Track)	Jeet Gannguli
2015	Hamari Adhuri Kahani	"Hamari Adhuri Kahani" (Title Track Encore)	Jeet Gannguli
2015	Hamari Adhuri Kahani	"Yeh Kaisi Jagah"	Jeet Gannguli and Zubeen Garg
2015	Hate Story 3	"Tumhe Apna Banane Ka"	Amaal Mallik
2016	Azhar	"Bol Do Na Zara"	Amaal Mallik
2016	Sarbjit	"Salamat"	Amaal Mallik and Devansh Bhatnagar
2016	Sarbjit	"Dard"	Jeet Gannguli and Devansh Bhatnagar
2016	Junooniyat	"Mujhko Barsaat Bana Lo"	Jeet Gannguli
2016	Raaz: Reboot	"Raaz Aankhein Teri"	Jeet Gannguli
2016	Raaz: Reboot	"Hummein Tummein Jo Tha"	Jeet Gannguli
2016	Raaz: Reboot	"The Sound of Raaz"	Jeet Gannguli
2016	Sanam Re	"Tum Bin"	Jeet Gannguli
2016	Raakh	"Bas Itna Hain Kehna"	Raju Singh
2016	Force 2	"Ishaara"	Amaal Mallik
2017	Chef	"Tere Mere"	Amaal Mallik
2017	Chef	"Tere Mere" (Reprise)	Amaal Mallik
2018	Phir Se...	"Phir Se" (Title Track)	Jeet Gannguli
2018	Phir Se...	"Rozana"	Jeet Gannguli
2018	Phir Se...	"Maine Socha Ki Chura Loon"	Jeet Gannguli
2018	Phir Se...	"Yeh Dil Jo Hai Baadmash Hai"	Jeet Gannguli
2018	Phir Se...	"Phir Se" (Sad Version)	Jeet Gannguli
2018	Marudhar Express	"Tum Chal Gaye" (Male)	Jeet Gannguli
2018	Marudhar Express	"Tum Chal Gaye" (Female)	Jeet Gannguli
2018	Parmanu: The Story of Pokhran	"Jitni Dafa"	Jeet Gannguli
2018	Jalebi	"Mera Pyar Tera Pyar"	Jeet Gannguli
2018	Jalebi	"Pehle Ke Jaisa"	Abhishek Mishra
2018	Hate Story 4	"Badnaamiyan" (Male)	Baman-Chand
2018	Hate Story 4	"Badnaamiyan" (Female)	Baman-Chand
2018	K.G.F: Chapter 1	"Gali Gali" (Hindi dubbed)	Tanishk Bagchi
2018	Simmba	"Tere Bin"	Tanishk Bagchi
2018	Simmba	"Bandeya Re Bandeya"	Tanishk Bagchi
2019	Jabariya Jodi	"Dhoonde Aakhiyaan"	Tanishk Bagchi
2019	Marjaavaan	"Thodi Si Jagah"	Tanishk Bagchi
2019	Marjaavaan	"Thodi Si Jagah" (Female)	Tanishk Bagchi
2019	Good Newwz	"Mana Dil"	Tanishk Bagchi
2019	Article 15	"Naina Yeh"	Piyush Shankar
2020	Sadak 2	"Sukhriya (Jubin Version)	Jeet Gannguli
2020	Sadak 2	"Sukhriya (Jubin, KK version)"	Jeet Gannguli
2020	Sadak 2	"Sukhriya (Arijit, Jubin, KK version)"	Jeet Gannguli
2020	Sadak 2	"Sukhriya (Arijit version)"	Jeet Gannguli
2020	Sadak 2	"Sukhriya (Shreya version)"	Jeet Gannguli
2021	Sanak	"Suna Hai" (Female version)	Jeet Gannguli
2021	Sanak	"Suna Hai"	Jeet Gannguli
2021	Sooryavanshi	"Mere Yaara"	JAM8
2021	Sooryavanshi	"Mere Yaara - Female"	JAM8
2021	Kaagaz	"Bail Gadi"	Pravesh Mallick
2021	Bell Bottom	"Tum Aaogey"	Amaal Mallik
2022	Radhe Shyam	"Jaan Hai Meri"	Amaal Mallik
2022	Radhe Shyam	"Laboon Pe Naam (Film Version)	Amaal Mallik
2022	Radhe Shyam	"Jaan Hai Meri (Lofi)"	Amaal Mallik
2022	Hurdang	"Kya Yehi Pyaar Hai"	Amaal Mallik
2022	Cuttputlli	"Lapataa"	Aditya Dev
2022	Regina	All Songs	Sathish Nair
2022	Thank God	"Dil De Diyan"	Rochak Kohli
2022	Thank God	"Manike Mage Hithe"	Tanishk Bagchi
2022	Thank God	"Haniya Ve"	Tanishk Bagchi
2022	Liger	"Aafat"	Tanishk Bagchi
2023	Gumraah	"Ghar Nahi Jaana"	Tanishk Bagchi
2023	U-Turn	"Raasta"	Arko Pravo Mukherjee
2023	U-Turn	"Raasta (Female)	Arko Pravo Mukherjee
2023	U-Turn	"Raasta (Reprise)"	Arko Pravo Mukherjee
2023	Sukhee	"Meethi Boliyan"	Arko Pravo Mukherjee
2023	Dream Girl 2	"Main Marjawangi"	Meet Bros
2024	The Family Star (Hindi Dubbed)	"Nandanandanaa"	Gopi Sundar
2024	The Family Star (Hindi Dubbed)	"Kalyani Tera Hoon Main"	Gopi Sundar
2024	The Family Star (Hindi Dubbed)	"Tum Bin Sajan"	Gopi Sundar
2024	The Family Star (Hindi Dubbed)	"Dekho Re Dekho"	Gopi Sundar
2024	Savi	"Paas Tere Main"	Javed-Mohsin
2024	Savi	"Vada Humse Karo"	Piyush Shankar
2024	Savi	"Vada Humse Karo (Version 2)"	Piyush Shankar
2024	Savi	"Vada Humse Karo (Sad Version)"	Piyush Shankar
2024	Savi	"Vada Humse Karo (Reprise)"	Piyush Shankar
2024	Dedh Bigha Zameen	"Chota Sa Mann"	Anurag Saikia
2024	Bhool Bhulaiyaa 3	"Beiraada"	Sachet-Prampara
2025	Ground Zero	"Lahoo"	Tanishk Bagchi
2025	Dhadak 2	"Bas Ek Dhadak"	Javed-Mohsin
2025	Dhadak 2	"Tu Meri Dhadak Hai"	Javed-Mohsin
2025	Love in Vietnam	"Bade Din Huye"	Amaal Mallik
2025	Love in Vietnam	"Jeena Nahi"	Amaal Mallik
2026	Awarapan 2	"Yeh Awarapan"	Amaal Mallik
2026	Awarapan 2	"Yeh Awarapan" (Amaal Malik version)	Amaal Mallik
2026	Awarapan 2	"Laado"	Jeet Gannguli

=== Single ===
Denotes films that have not yet been released

Year	Albums	Songs	Composers
2015	"Chal Wahan Jaate Hain" Single		Amaal Mallik
2015	"Main Rahoon Ya Na Rahoon" Single		Amaal Mallik
2016	"Tum Ho Toh Lagta Hai" Single		Amaal Mallik
2016	"Halka Halka Remake" Single		Abhijit Vaghani
2017	"Phir Se" Single		Jeet Gannguli
2017	"Sajna Ve" Single		Aditya Dev
2018	Zee Music Originals	"Barsaat Mein"	Jeet Gannguli
2018	Zee Music Originals	"Koi Karega Na Tumse Pyaar"	Jeet Gannguli
2018	Zee Music Originals	"Theher Jao Na"	Jeet Gannguli
2018	"Leja Leja Re Remake" Single		Tanishk Bagchi
2019	Zee Music Originals	"Neeinden"	Jeet Gannguli
2019	Zee Music Originals	"Gungunati Rehti Hoon"	Jeet Gannguli
2020	"Meri Aashiqui" Single		Rochak Kohli
2020	"Tu Mera Nahi" Single		Amaal Mallik
2021	"Chale Aatein Hai" Single		Jeet Gannguli

== Rashmi Singh as Lyricist ==
=== Filmography ===
Year	Films	Songs	Composers
2014	CityLights	"Muskurane"	Jeet Gannguli
2014	CityLights	"Darbadar"	Jeet Gannguli
2014	CityLights	"Ek Charraiya"	Jeet Gannguli
2014	CityLights	"CityLights" (Title Track)	Jeet Gannguli
2014	CityLights	"Soney Do"	Jeet Gannguli
2014	CityLights	"Ek Charraiya" (Unplugged)	Jeet Gannguli
2014	CityLights	"Muskurane" (Unplugged)	Jeet Gannguli
2015	Khamoshiyan	"Khamoshiyan" (Title Track)	Jeet Gannguli
2015	Khamoshiyan	"Khamoshiyan" (Female Version)	Jeet Gannguli
2015	Khamoshiyan	"Khamoshiyan" (Unplugged)	Jeet Gannguli
2015	Khamoshiyan	"Kya Khoya"	Naved Zafar
2015	Mr. X	"Teri Khushboo" (Male)	Jeet Gannguli
2015	Mr. X	"Teri Khusboo" (Female)	Jeet Gannguli
2015	Mr. X	"Mr. X" (Title Song)	Jeet Gannguli

== Virag Mishra as Lyricist ==
=== Filmography ===
Year	Films/Albums	Songs	Composers
2006	Zinda	"Zinda Hoon" Main	Nikhil Chinnappa, Dj Nawed
2010	The Film Emotional Atyachar		
2017	"Salaami De" Single	"Salaami De"	Jeet Gannguli

== Rashmi Virag as Director ==
=== Filmography ===
Year	Film	Actors
2017	Neelofar (Short Film)	Satish Kaushik, Harsh Vardhan Deo

== Rashmi Singh Won Awards ==
Year	Category	Nominated Song	Film	Result	Composers
60th Filmfare Awards
2014	Best Lyrics	"Muskurane"	CityLights	Won	Jeet Gannguli
