= List of highest-grossing re-released Indian films =

This ranking lists the highest-grossing re-released Indian films produced by Indian film industries, based on conservative global box office estimates as reported by organizations classified as green by Wikipedia. The figures are not adjusted for inflation. However, there is no official tracking of figures, and sources publishing data are frequently pressured to increase their estimates.

== Key ==
Background shading indicates that a film, or at least one from a series, is currently showing in theatres worldwide.

== Highest-grossing films ==
Rank	Film	Language	Worldwide gross (Note: Re-run gross collection)	Footfalls	Ref.
1	Baahubali: The Epic	Telugu	₹51.70 crore		
2	Sanam Teri Kasam	Hindi	₹41 crore		
3	Tumbbad	Hindi	₹39–40.6 crore	10.25 lakh	(Note: Tumbbad's reported worldwide grosses vary between ₹39 crore (Asianet News Malyalam) – ₹40 crore (The Financial Express (India)) – ₹40.6 crore (The Times of India))
4	Ghilli	Tamil	₹24-28crore		
5	Yeh Jawaani Hai Deewani	Hindi	₹27.25 crore		(Note: 2024 – ₹1.25 crore)
6	Padayappa	Tamil	₹18.60 crore		
7	Mankatha	Tamil	₹15-16 crore		
8	Sachein	Tamil	₹13.60 crore		
9	Darling	Telugu	₹10.44 crore		
10	Khaleja	Telugu	₹10.25 crore		
11	Rockstar	Hindi	₹10 crore	3 lakh	(Note: Rockstar's reported worldwide grosses vary between ₹10 crore (India Today) – ₹10.50 crore (Hindustan Times) – ₹11.5 crore (WION) – ₹12 crore (CNBC TV18))
12	Laila Majnu	Hindi	₹9–12 crore		(Note: Laila Majnu's reported worldwide grosses vary between ₹9 crore (CNBC TV18) – ₹10.75 crore (Daily News and Analysis) – ₹11.5 (WION) – ₹11.50 crore (News18) – ₹12 crore (Pune Mirror))
13	Jalsa	Telugu	₹8.52–8.90 crore	2.58 lakh	(Note: jalsa's reported worldwide grosses vary between ₹8.52 crore (Zee News Telugu) – ₹8.85 crore (News18) – ₹8.90 crore (India Today))
14	Arya 2	Telugu	₹8.07 crore	1.79 lakh	
15	Murari	Telugu	₹7.4 crore	1.79 lakh	
16	Kushi	Telugu	₹7.46 crore		
17	Salaar: Part 1 – Ceasefire	Telugu	₹6.09 crore	19 lakh+	
18	Businessman	Telugu	₹5.85 crore	1.90 lakh	
19	Kal Ho Naa Ho	Hindi	₹5.80 crore	1 lakh+	
20	Devadoothan	Malayalam	₹5.4 crore		
21	Veer-Zaara	Hindi	₹5 crore		
22	Spadikam	Malayalam	₹4.95 crore		
23	Manichitrathazhu	Malayalam	₹4.71 crore		
24	Ravanaprabhu	Malayalam	₹4.70 crore		
25	Simhadri	Telugu	₹4.60 crore		
26	Chotta Mumbai	Malayalam	₹4.37 crore		
27	Rehnaa Hai Terre Dil Mein	Hindi	₹4 crore		
28	Ee Nagaraniki Emaindhi	Telugu	₹3.52 crore		
29	S/O Satyamurthy	Telugu	₹3.40 crore		
30	Orange	Telugu	₹3.36 crore		
31	Jalsa	Telugu	₹3.20 crore		
32	Surya S/o Krishnan (Note: It is a dubbed version of 2008 Tamil film Vaaranam Aayiram)	Telugu	₹3.5 crore		
33	Okkadu	Telugu	₹2.54 crore		
34	Thalapathi	Tamil	₹2 crore		
34	Appu	Kannada	₹2 crore		
35	Pokiri	Telugu	₹1.73 crore		
36	Desamuduru	Telugu	₹1.65 crore		
37	Karan Arjun	Hindi	₹1.60 crore		
38	Oru Vadakkan Veeragatha	Malayalam	₹1.53 crore		
39	Jab We Met	Hindi	₹1.50 crore		
40	3	Tamil	₹1.50 crore		
41	Billa	Tamil	₹1.25 crore		

== Highest-grossing films by opening day ==
Rank	Film	Language	Worldwide gross	Ref.
1	Baahubali: The Epic	Telugu	₹19.50-20 crore	
2	Khaleja	Telugu	₹8.26 crore	
3	Gabbar Singh	Telugu	₹7.59 crore	
4	Murari	Telugu	₹5.45 crore	
5	Simhadri	Telugu	₹4.60–5.14 crore	(Note: Simhadri's reported opening day worldwide grosses vary between ₹4.60 crore (News18) – ₹5.14 crore (Telangana Today))
6	Kushi	Telugu	₹4.10–4.15 crore	(Note: Kushi's reported opening day worldwide grosses vary between ₹4.10 crore (OTTPlay) – ₹4.15 crore (Telangana Today))
7	Arya 2	Telugu	₹4.02 crore	
8	Sanam Teri Kasam	Hindi	₹4–5.14 crore	(Note: Sanam Teri Kasam's reported opening day worldwide grosses vary between ₹4 crore (Pinkvilla) – ₹4.25 crore (India Today) – ₹5.14 crore (NDTV))
9	Jalsa	Telugu	₹3.20 crore	
10	Indra	Telugu	₹3.05 crore	
11	Salaar: Part 1 – Ceasefire	Telugu	₹2.75 crore	(Note: Salaar: Part 1 – Ceasefire's reported opening day worldwide grosses vary between ₹2.75 crore ₹3.24 crore (Asianet News and Hindustan Times Telugu))
12	Okkadu	Telugu	₹2.10 crore	(Note: Okkadu's reported opening day worldwide grosses vary between ₹2.05 crore (Times Now) – ₹2.10 crore (Zee News Telugu))
13	Sachein	Tamil	₹2 crore	
14	Ee Nagaraniki Emaindhi	Telugu	₹1.78 crore	
15	Pokiri	Telugu	₹1.73 crore	
16	Tumbbad	Hindi	₹1.65 crore	
17	Orange	Telugu	₹1.60 crore	
18	Sholay	Hindi	₹1.50 crore	
19	Desamuduru	Telugu	₹1.50 crore	
20	3	Tamil	₹1.50 crore	
21	Yeh Jawaani Hai Deewani	Hindi	₹1.15–1.90 crore	(Note: Yeh Jawaani Hai Deewani's reported opening day worldwide grosses vary between ₹1.15 crore (Bollywood Hungama) – ₹1.20 crore (TV9 Bharatvarsh) – ₹1.90 crore (NDTV))
22	Chennakesava Reddy	Telugu	₹1.10 crore	
23	Billa	Telugu	₹1.5 crore	
24	Indian	Tamil	₹1 crore	
24	Jackie	Kannada	₹1 crore	

== Highest-grossing milestone films ==
Year	Film	Language	Milestone	Ref.
2014	Sholay	Hindi	₹10 crore	
2024	Tumbbad	Hindi	₹30 crore	
2025	Sanam Teri Kasam	Hindi	₹40 crore	
2025	Baahubali: The Epic	Telugu	₹50 crore	

== See also ==
- List of highest-grossing Indian films
