= Darshan Raval =

Indian singer, composer, actor, and songwriter

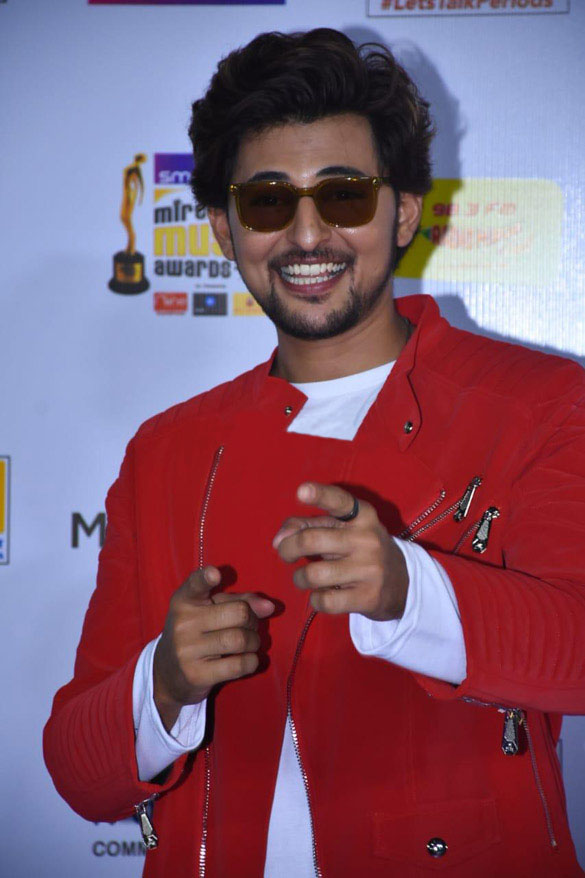

Background information
- Born: 18 October 1994 (age 32); Ahmedabad, Gujarat, India
- Occupations: Singer; composer; songwriter
- Years active: 2014–present
- Spouse: Dharal Surelia (m. 2025)
- Musical career
- Genres: Indian pop; Filmi
- Labels: Indie Music Label; T-Series; Sony Music India; Warner Music India; Tips Music Industries Limited

YouTube information
- Channel: DarshanRavalDZ
- Years active: 2008–present
- Genre: Music
- Subscribers: 4.29 million
- Views: 952.2 million
- Last updated: 12 July 2025
- Website: https://darshanraval.com/

Darshan Raval (born 18 October 1994) is an Indian singer, composer, and songwriter. He is known for his work in Hindi, Gujarati, Punjabi and Bengali. He finished as the runner-up in the 2014 StarPlus reality music show India's Raw Star.

== Early life ==
Darshan Raval was born on 18 October 1994 in Ahmedabad, Gujarat into a Gujarati Hindu family. His father Rajendra Raval is a freelance writer. His mother Rajal Raval was a housemaker.

Raval was expelled from college due to poor academic performance.

== Career ==
In 2014, Raval began his career by participating in the reality show "India's Raw Star," led by Yo Yo Honey Singh where he was the first runner-up. Raval has mentioned the support of Himesh Reshammiya as an important factor in his initial success in Bollywood.

As of 2023, he has released several popular songs in different languages, including Hindi, Gujarati, and Telugu. Some of his notable works include "Ek Ladki Ko Dekha Toh Aisa Laga" from the film of the same name, "Chogada" from the film Loveyatri, "Kabhi Tumhe" from Shershaah and "Kheech Meri Photo" in Sanam Teri Kasam.

== Media ==
Raval was ranked in The Times Most Desirable Men at No. 45 in 2017. He won awards for Transmedia Gujarati Screen and Stage Award for Best Male Singer.

== Personal life ==
He married his best friend and long time girlfriend, Dharal Surelia who is the founder and principal architect at Butter Concepts. The couple tied the knot on 18 January 2025.

== Discography ==
=== Film songs ===
==== Hindi ====
Year	Film	Song	Music	Lyrics	Co-singers	Note
2015	Prem Ratan Dhan Payo	"Jab Tum Chaho"	Himesh Reshammiya	Irshad Kamil	Mohammed Irfan, Palak Muchhal	
2016	Teraa Surroor	"Main Woh Chaand"	Himesh Reshammiya	Sameer		
2016	Teraa Surroor	"Bekhudi"	Himesh Reshammiya	Shabbir Ahmed	Aditi Singh Sharma	
2016	Sanam Teri Kasam	"Kheech Meri Photo"	Himesh Reshammiya	Sameer	Neeti Mohan, Akasa Singh	
2018	Dost Taru Sapnu	"Khwahish Mein Teri"	Amit Sharad Trivedi	Nadeem Ahmad		Gujarati film; Hindi soundtrack version
2018	Loveyatri	"Chogada"	Lijo George-DJ Chetas	Himself, Shabbir Ahmed	Asees Kaur	
2018	Loveyatri	"Chogada (Unplugged)"	Lijo George-DJ Chetas	Himself, Shabbir Ahmed		
2018	Mitron	"Kamariya"	Lijo George-DJ Chetas	Kumaar		
2018	Mitron	"Sanedo"	Tanishk Bagchi, Vayu	Vayu	Raja Hasan	
2019	Petta	"Nazar Sarsari"	Anirudh Ravichander	Raqueeb Alam		Tamil film; Hindi soundtrack version
2019	Ek Ladki Ko Dekha Toh Aisa Laga	"Ek Ladki Ko Dekha Toh Aisa Laga"	R. D. Burman (recreated by Rochak Kohli)	Javed Akhtar (rewritten by Gurpreet Saini)	Rochak Kohli	
2019	Made in China	"Odhani"	Sachin–Jigar	Niren Bhatt, Jigar Saraiya	Neha Kakkar	
2020	Love Aaj Kal	"Mehrama"	Pritam	Irshad Kamil	Antara Mitra	
2020	Love Aaj Kal	"Mehrama" (Extended)	Pritam	Irshad Kamil	Antara Mitra	
2020	Ludo	"Dil Julaha"	Pritam	Swanand Kirkire		Netflix film
2021	Shershaah	"Kabhi Tumhe"	Javed-Mohsin	Rashmi Virag		Amazon Prime Video film
2021	Bell Bottom	"Khair Mangde (Male Version)"	Shantanu Dutta	Seema Saini		
2021	Tadap	"Tere Siva Jag mein"	Pritam	Irshad Kamil, Sholke Lal, Charan	Shilpa Rao, Charan	
2021	Tadap	"Tere Siva Jag Mein (Cafe Mix)"	Pritam	Irshad Kamil, Sholke Lal, Charan		
2023	Rocky Aur Rani Kii Prem Kahaani	"Dhindora Baje Re"	Pritam	Amitabh Bhattacharya	Bhoomi Trivedi	
2023	The Great Indian Family	"Sahibaa"	Pritam	Amitabh Bhattacharya	Antara Mitra	
2023	Aankh Micholi	"Kaleja Kad Ke"	Sachin-Jigar	Jigar Saraiya	Asees Kaur	
2024	Chandu Champion	"Na Door Hai Na Paas Hai"	Pritam	Kausar Munir		
2024	Ishq Vishk Rebound	"Soni Soni"	Rochak Kohli	Gurpreet Saini	Jonita Gandhi	
2024	Ishq Vishk Rebound	"Jaavi Na"	Rochak Kohli	Kumaar	Jasleen Royal	
2024	The Miranda Brothers	"Be My Mehbooba"	Amaal Mallik	Kumaar	Neeti Mohan	
2025	Dhadak 2	"Preet Re"	Rochak Kohli	Gurpreet Saini	Jonita Gandhi	
2025	Tere Ishk Mein	"Jigar Thanda"	A. R. Rahman	Irshad Kamil		

==== Gujarati ====
Year	Film	Song	Music	Lyrics	Co-singer(s)	Notes
2013	Koi Ne Kehsho Nahi	"Chakad Chu Chi Chi"	Samir-Mana	Dave Jigar	Rucha Rawal, Jigar Dan Ghavi	
2014	Whisky Is Risky	"It's Time to Party"	Samir-Mana	Dave Jigar		
2015	Romance Complicated	"Pehla Varsad"	Himself			
2015	Romance Complicated	"Pehla Varsad (Sad Version)"	Himself			
2015	Romance Complicated	"Tu Ne Hoon"	Himself			
2016	Tuu to Gayo	"Aa Konu Maara Baap Nu"	Rahul Munjariya, Himself	Himself, Niren Bhatt		
2016	Tuu to Gayo	"Kevo Thayo Pagal Hoon"	Rahul Munjariya, Himself	Himself	Akasa Singh	
2016	Khaatti Meethi Setting	"Maro Glass Kyaan Chhe"	Rishi-Siddharth	Niren Bhatt	Jahnvi Shrimankar, Rishi-Siddharth	
2017	Chor Bani Thangaat Kare	"Bhuli Javu Che (Remix Version)"	Sachin–Jigar	Niren Bhatt		
2017	Vitamin She	"Maachhalio Ude"	Mehul Surti	Raeesh Maniar		
2018	Aavuj Rehshe	"Prem Rog"	Rahul Munjariya, Himself	Nitin Jani		
2018	Aavuj Rehshe	"Aavuj Rehshe"	Rahul Munjariya, Himself	Nitin Jani		

==== Telugu ====
Year	Film	Song	Music	Lyrics	Co-singer(s)	Notes
2019	Jersey	"Needa Padadhani"	Anirudh Ravichander	Krishna Kanth		

=== Non-film songs ===
==== Hindi ====
Year	Album/Single	Song	Music	Lyrics	Co-singer(s)	Notes
2013	Mera Dil Dil Dil	"Mera Dil Dil Dil"	Himself			
2014	Pehli Mohabbat	"Pehli Mohabbat"	Himself			
2015	Ishq Chadha Hai	"Ishq Chadha Hai"	Himself			
2015	Aasma	"Aasma"	Lokesh Bakshi			
2015	Sunny Sunny - The Workout Song	"Sunny Sunny - The Workout Song"	Achu Rajamani	Rahul Seth	Rimi Nique, Rahul Seth	ft. Sunny Leone
2015	Phir Bhi Na Maane...Badtameez Dil	All songs except "Yaadein Teri (Jeene Ke Duaa)"	Himself			on StarPlus (Hotstar for later episodes)
2016	Ab Phirse Jab Baarish	"Ab Phirse Jab Baarish"	Himself			
2016	Tu Dua Hai	"Tu Dua Hai"	Himself			
2016	Tuu	"Tuu"	Himself			
2016	Tere Siva	"Tere Siva"	Rishi & Siddharth	Siddhart Amit Bhavsar		
2017	U, Me Aur Ghar	"Tu Hi Tha"	Nishant Pandey	Himself		Web film
2017	Jahan Bhi Yaad Teri	"Jahan Bhi Yaad Teri"	Sachin Gupta	Sachin Gupta & Sameer	Sachin Gupta	
2017	Nayan Ne Bandh Rakhine	"Nayan Ne Bandh Rakhine"	Himself	Manhar Udhas (Gujarati Ghazal), A. M. Turaz (Hindi)		
2017	Tera Zikr	"Tera Zikr"	Himself	A. M. Turaz		
2017	Tera Zikr (Reprise)	"Tera Zikr (Reprise)"	Himself	A. M. Turaz		
2017	Ye Baarish	"Ye Baarish"	Himself	A. M. Turaz		
2017	Saari Ki Saari	"Saari Ki Saari"	Himself	Himself		
2018	Shab Tum Ho	"Shab Tum Ho"	Himself	Sayeed Quadri		
2018	Baarish Lete Aana	"Baarish Lete Aana"	Sundeep Gosswami	Naveen Tyagi		
2018	Baarish Lete Aana (Unplugged)	"Baarish Lete Aana (Unplugged)"	Sundeep Gosswami	Naveen Tyagi		
2018	Baarish Lete Aana 2.0	"Baarish Lete Aana 2.0"				
2018	Do Din	"Do Din"	Himself, Danny Thakrar	Kunaal Vermaa		
2018	Roop - Mard Ka Naya Swaroop	"Rishta Tha"	Sangram Jassu	TBA		
2018	Subway India Theme - Make It What You Want	"Make It What You Want"	Shor Police	Puneet Krishna, Bianca Gomes	Bianca Gomes, Clinton Cerejo	Subway India Theme
2019	Four More Shots Please!	"Yaara Teri Yaari"	Himself	Naveen Tyagi		Web series; Amazon Prime Video
2019	Bhula Diya	"Bhula Diya"	Anurag Saikia	A. M. Turaz		
2019	Kaash Aisa Hota	"Kaash Aisa Hota"	Himself	Himself		
2019	Kaash Aisa Hota (Remix)	"Kaash Aisa Hota" (Remix)	Himself, Lijo George-DJ Chetas	Himself		
2019	Jammin - Season 2	"Kaash Tum Mere Hote"	Salim–Sulaiman	Pankaj L Pandya	Sukriti Kakar	
2019	Hawa Banke	"Hawa Banke"	Nirmaan			Inspired by Hadiqa Kiani's "Boohe Bariyan"
2019	Dil Mera Blast	"Dil Mera Blast"	Javed–Mohsin	Danish Sabri		
2019	Yaari Ka Circle	"Yaari Ka Circle"	Tanishk Bagchi		Jonita Gandhi	
2019	Tu Mileya	"Tu Mileya"	Himself	Gupreet Saini, Gautam G Sharma		
2019	Aa Jaana	"Aa Jaana"	Lijo George-DJ Chetas	Kumaar	Prakriti Kakar	
2020	Asal Mein	"Asal Mein"	Himself	Gupreet Saini, Gautam G Sharma		
2020	Asal Mein (Remix)	"Asal Mein (Remix)"	Himself, Lijo George-DJ Chetas	Gupreet Saini, Gautam G Sharma		
2020	Bhula Dunga	"Bhula Dunga"	Himself	Gupreet Saini, Gautam G Sharma		ft. Sidharth Shukla and Shehnaaz Gill
2020	Saari Ki Saari 2.0	"Saari Ki Saari 2.0"	Himself, Lijo George	Himself	Asees Kaur	
2020	Tere Naal	"Tere Naal"	Himself	Gupreet Saini, Gautam G Sharma	Tulsi Kumar	
2020	Ek Tarfa	"Ek Tarfa"	Himself	Youngveer		
2020	Ek Tarfa (Reprise)	"Ek Tarfa (Reprise)"	Himself	Youngveer		
2020	Ek Tarfa 2.0	"Ek Tarfa 2.0"				
2020	Teri Aankhon Mein	"Teri Aankhon Mein"	Manan Bhardwaj	Kumaar	Neha Kakkar	ft. Divya Khosla Kumar, Pearl V Puri and Rohit Suchanti
2020	Judaiyaan	"Judaiyaan"	Himself	Rashmi Virag	Shreya Ghoshal	
2020	Judaiyaan	"Mujhe Peene Do"	Himself	Gupreet Saini, Gautam G Sharma		
2020	Judaiyaan	"Mujhe Peene Do 2.0"	Himself	Gupreet Saini, Gautam G Sharma		
2020	Judaiyaan	"Barsaat"	Rashmi Virag			
2020	Judaiyaan	"Main Kisi Aur Ka"	Siddharth Amit Bhavsar	Gupreet Saini, Gautam G Sharma		
2020	Judaiyaan	"Maa"	Himself	Himself		
2020	Judaiyaan	"Judaiyaan (Reprise)"	Himself	Rashmi Virag		
2021	Rabba Mehar Kari	"Rabba Mehar Kari"	Himself	Youngveer	ft. Darshan Raval and Diksha Singh	
2021	Vilayati Sharaab	"Vilayati Sharaab"	Lijo George-DJ Chetas	Kumaar	Neeti Mohan	ft. Allu Sirish and Heli Daruwala
2021	Is Qadar	"Is Qadar"	Sachet–Parampara	Sayeed Quadri	Tulsi Kumar	
2021	Dil Hai Deewana	"Dil Hai Deewana"	Tanishk Bagchi	Shabbir Ahmed	Zara Khan	ft. Arjun Kapoor and Rakul Preet Singh
2021	Jannat Ve	"Jannat Ve"	Himself	Nirmaan		
2021	Tera Naam	"Tera Naam"	Manan Bhardwaj		Tulsi Kumar	
2021	Duniya Chhor Doon	"Duniya Chhor Doon"	Aditya Dev	Youngveer		
2022	Goriye	"Goriye"	Gurpreet Saini	Gurpreet Saini and Gautam G Sharma		ft. Malvika Raaj
2022	Baarishion Mein	"Baarishion Mein"	Himself	Gurpreet Saini and Gautam G Sharma		ft. Malvika Sharma
2022	Tum Mere	"Tum Mere"	Himself	Gurpreet Saini and Gautam G Sharma		
2022	Dhol Bajaa	"Dhol Bajaa"	Javed-Mohsin	Danish Sabri	Prakriti Giri	ft. Warina Hussain
2022	Mann Mohini	"Mann Mohini"	Anmol Daniel	Gurpeet Saini		1 Min Music
2023	Piya Re	"Piya Re"	Himself	Gurpreet Saini and Gautam G Sharma		
2023	"Dard"	"Ho Nai Sakda"	Himself	Youngveer and Mohsin Shaikh		
2023	"Dard"	"Mahiye Jinna Sohna"	Himself	Youngveer		
2023	"Dard"	"Lo Aayi Barsaat"	Himself	Youngveer		
2023	"Dard"	"Haaye Dard"	Himself	Youngveer		
2023	"Dard"	"Jaane De"	Himself	Youngveer		
2023	"Dard"	"Faasla"	Himself	Youngveer	Shirley Setia	
2023	"Dard"	"Mannat"	Himself	Youngveer	Prakriti Kakar	
2023	"Dard"	"Saahiba"	Himself	Youngveer and Himself		
2023	"Dard"	"Mahiye Jinna Sohna (Unplugged)"	Himself	Youngveer and Himself		
2023	Saajan Ve	"Saajan Ve"	Himself	Gurpreet Saini		
2024	Tu Hai	"Tu Hai"	Himself	Gurpreet Saini	Prakriti Giri	ft. Neha Sharma
2024	Out of Control	"Jeeja"	Himself	Gurpreet Saini		ft. Chandni B.
2024	Out of Control	"Kinni Soni"	Himself	Gurpreet Saini		ft. Shruti Sharma
2024	Out of Control	"O Beliya"		Himself		ft. Ahsaas Channa
2024	Out of Control	"Taarifein"		Himself		Album audio released on 18 October 2024 (Raval's 30th birthday)
2024	Out of Control	"Ik Tara"		Himself		Album audio released on 18 October 2024 (Raval's 30th birthday)
2024	Out of Control	"Batao Zara"		Himself		Album audio released on 18 October 2024 (Raval's 30th birthday)
2024	Out of Control	"Tera Ho Gaya"		Himself		Album audio released on 18 October 2024 (Raval's 30th birthday)
2024	Out of Control	"Yaar Mere"		Himself		Album audio released on 18 October 2024 (Raval's 30th birthday)
2024	Out of Control	"Out of Control"		Himself	Panther	Album audio released on 18 October 2024 (Raval's 30th birthday)
2025	Sajna	"Sajna"	Himself	Himself		ft. Aditya Gadhvi, Hansika Pareek; Released shortly after Darshan's wedding with Dharal
2025	Morni	"Morni"	Himself	Himself	Himself	
2025	I Loved You	"Nafrat"	Himself	Himself	Noor	Album audio released on 18 October 2025 (Raval's 31st birthday)
2025	I Loved You	"Jiyaa"	Himself	Himself	Himself	Album audio released on 18 October 2025 (Raval's 31st birthday)
2025	I Loved You	"Deewana"	Himself	Himself	Gurpreet Saini	Album audio released on 18 October 2025 (Raval's 31st birthday)
2025	I Loved You	"Haara"	Basharat Ali	Himself		Album audio released on 18 October 2025 (Raval's 31st birthday)
2026	Saathiya	"Saathiya"	Himself	Himself		ft. Anmol Daniel, Prakriti Giri, Suryakant Sharma, Rinkle Jain

==== Gujarati ====
Year	Album/Single	Song	Music	Lyrics	Co-singer(s)	NoteS
2016	Aavi Navratri	"Aavi Navratri"	Rahul Munjariya, Himself	Himself, Folk lyrics		
2017	Nayan Ne Bandh Rakhine	"Nayan Ne Bandh Rakhine"	Himself	Manhar Udhas (Gujarati Ghazal), A. M. Turaz (Hindi)		
2017	Taari Vaato (Tera Zikr)	"Taari Vaato (Tera Zikr)"	Himself	Niren Bhatt		Gujrati version of "Tera Zikr"

==== Bengali ====
Year	Album/Single	Song	Music	Lyrics	Co-singer(s)	Note
2017	Tor Kotha (Tera Zikr)	"Tor Kotha (Tera Zikr)"	Himself	Ambarish Majmudar		Bengali version of "Tera Zikr"
