= Kakuda (disambiguation) =

Kakuda may refer to:

- Kakuda, Miyagi, a city in Miyagi, Japan
- Kakuda (film), a 2024 Hindi-language Indian film
- Makoto Kakuda (born 1983), Japanese footballer
- Nobuaki Kakuda (born 1961), Japanese karateka and kickboxer
