= Aasif Khan =

Indian actor (born 1991)

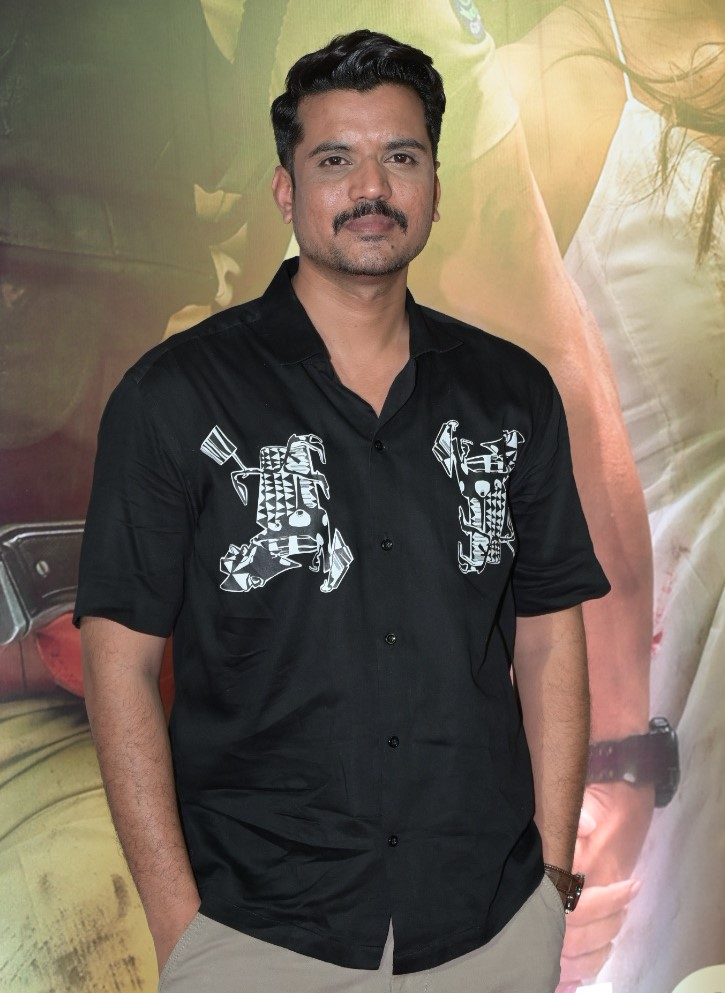
- Born: 13 March 1991 (age 35); Nimbahera, Rajasthan, India
- Occupation: Actor
- Spouse: Zeba (m. 2024)

Aasif Khan (born 13 March 1991) is an Indian actor, best known for his role as Babar in action crime thriller web television series Mirzapur (2018–2020).

== Early life ==
Aasif Khan was born and raised in Nimbahera, a small town in Chittorgarh district of Rajasthan, India. His father, Mr. Late Ayyub Khan was an employee in J.K. Cement, and his mother, Mrs. Firdous Ayyub Khan is a housewife. He has two brothers and a sister.

Khan was mediocre in academics but had a great inclination towards the field of arts. His keenness for acting began in 2001 at his school's annual event, where he performed the role of a servant in Kissa Kursi Ka play.

He was deeply inspired by the "Shaadiwallah" act performed by comedian Raju Srivastava in the popular TV show The Great Indian Laughter Challenge. It encouraged him to participate in the stand-up competition held locally where he surprisingly won.

The sudden death of his father in 2008 brought his acting ambition to a halt. He engaged himself in taking up small jobs for a living and parallelly completed his higher secondary education.

== Career ==
Khan moved to Mumbai in 2010 to revive his acting ambition. For sustenance, he initially worked in a hotel as a waiter. He later worked in a mall and simultaneously gave auditions, where he was advised to learn the art of acting and perform theatre. He appeared in Ready and Agneepath as a junior artist.

In 2011, he joined Sarthak and Ujaagar Theatre Group in Jaipur to learn theatre and sharpen his acting skills. He performed as a professional theatre artist, his first play being Abu Hassan directed by Rajiv Acharya, and several others for 5 years with prestigious groups and renowned personalities like Sabir Khan.

In 2015, he performed the Rajasthani play Kasumal Sapno, a musical adaptation of William Shakespeare's comedy, A Midsummer Night's Dream, directed by Ajeet Singh Palawat at the International Theatre Festival in Karachi organized by the Pakistan National Academy of Performing Arts (NAPA).

Aasif returned to Mumbai in 2016 and worked as a casting associate for a year in Casting Bay owned by his mentor cum friend Abhishek Banerjee and Anmol Ahuja. He made cameo appearances in Toilet: Ek Prem Katha and Pari.

He played the lead role as Durgesh Kumar – a young aspirant for an interview in Anurag Worlikar's short film Vacancy (2017) for which he won the Best Actor award in Skylight Film Festival (2018) and Cineshorts by Viacom18.

In 2018, he played Babar, a loyal aide in web series Mirzapur.

Aasif made his Bollywood film debut in Raj Kumar Gupta's India's Most Wanted (2019) where he played a crucial role of Bittu Sinha alongside Arjun Kapoor. He appeared as Chintu in Humorously Yours (2019).

In 2020, Aasif overwhelmed the audience by his appearance in a crucial role of a journalist as Anas Ahmad in Jamtara – Sabka Number Ayega. He was next seen as a stubborn bridegroom in The Viral Fever's comedy drama Panchayat (2020). He then appeared in Paatal Lok (2020) as Kabir M, a petty car thief who makes great efforts in dissembling his identity during an interrogation.

He continued to play Babar in Mirzapur season 2 and appeared in short film: Sorry (2020).

In 2021, Khan appeared in Click (2021), a short film streamed on Disney+ Hotstar and then appeared as Parchun in Umesh Bist's comedy-drama film Pagglait which was released on 26 March 2021 on Netflix.

In 2022, Aasif appeared in the web series Human which was streamed on Disney+ Hotstar, in Dil Se Hero, a mini-series by FilterCopy, and in Murder In Agonda, an Amazon miniTV web series.

Aasif appeared as a lead protagonist in Ghar Set Hai, a comedy-drama web television series streamed on VOOT.

Khan was next seen in The Great Indian Family, a romantic comedy film written and directed by Vijay Krishna Acharya and produced by Aditya Chopra under Yash Raj Films banner. He was featured in Amazon miniTV's web series - Dehati Ladke, as Prashant Bhaiya, who is an extremely talented UPSC aspirant, a mentor and a role model for the youth. Aasif's portrayal of Prashant Bhaiya, left a lasting mark adding to the richness of the character dynamics.

Aasif's return as Ganesh in Panchayat season 3 was a perfect set up for an explosive season finale. His surprise appearance was massively applauded by the audience with majority complimenting his role from being the most hated in season 1 to the most loved character in season 3. He next featured in Kakuda, a horror-comedy film directed by Aditya Sarpotdar and produced by Ronnie Screwvala, under RSVP Movies, released on ZEE5.

Aasif was spotted next as Nasir in The Bhootnii, a horror-comedy film directed by Sidhaant Sachdev, and produced by Deepak Mukut & Sanjay Dutt, which released in theaters on 1st May 2025.

He will be seen next in romantic comedy films viz. Ishq Chakkallas and Noorani Chehra. Aasif will also be featured in Section 108, a thriller drama, written and directed by Rasikh Khan and presented by Anees Bazmee.

== Filmography ==
=== Films ===
Key
†	Denotes films that have not yet been released

Year	Title	Role	Notes	Ref(s)
2011	Ready	Junior artist		
2012	Agneepath	Junior artist		
2017	Toilet: Ek Prem Katha	Reporter		
2018	Pari	Ismail		
2019	India's Most Wanted	Bittu Sinha		
2021	Pagglait	Parchun		
2023	The Great Indian Family	Tulsidas Mishra		
2024	Kakuda	Kilvish		
2025	The Bhootnii	Nasir		
TBA	Ishq Chakallas †	TBA		
TBA	Noorani Chehra †	Zaheer	Completed	
TBA	Section 108 †	TBA		

=== Web series ===
Year	Title	Role	Ref(s)
2018	Mirzapur	Babar	
2019	Humorously Yours	Chintu	
2020	Jamtara - Sabka Number Ayega	Anas Ahmad	
2020	Panchayat	Ganesh- the groom	
2020	Paatal Lok	Kabir M	
2020	Mirzapur: Season 2	Babar	
2022	Human	Omar Pervez	
2022	Murder In Agonda	Sanket Salelkar	
2022	Ghar Set Hai	Lakhan	
2023	Dehati Ladke	Prashant Bhaiya	
2024	Dehati Ladke Season 2	Prashant Bhaiya	
2024	Panchayat :Season 3	Ganesh	

=== Television ===
Year	Title	Role	Notes	Ref(s)
2026	Bigg Boss 20	Contestant	12th place	

=== Short films ===
Year	Title	Role	Ref(s)
2017	Vacancy	Durgesh Kumar	
2020	Sorry	Yaman	
2021	Click	Ashish	
2022	Dil Se Hero	Vikram	

=== Music video ===
Year	Title	Role	Notes	Ref.
2022	Galtiyan	Aditya	Debut music video	

=== As casting associate ===
Year	Film/Series
2016-2017	TVF Bachelors
2017	What Will People Say
2017	Secret Superstar
2018	Pari
2018	Raid
2018	Bhonsle
2018	Mirzapur
2019	Luka Chuppi
2019	Arjun Patiala
2019	ChupChaap

== Awards and nominations ==
Year	Award	Category	Work	Result
2018	Cineshorts by Viacom18	Best Actor	Vacancy	Won
2018	Skylight Film Festival	Best Actor	Vacancy	Won
