= Andhadhun =

2018 Indian film by Sriram Raghavan

- Theatrical release poster
- Directed by: Sriram Raghavan
- Written by: Sriram Raghavan; Hemanth M. Rao; Pooja Ladha Surti; Arijit Biswas; Yogesh Chandekar
- Produced by: Sudhanshu Vats; Ajit Andhare; Gaurav Nanda; Ashok Vasodia; Kewal Garg; Sanjay Routray
- Starring: Tabu; Ayushmann Khurrana; Radhika Apte; Anil Dhawan
- Cinematography: K. U. Mohanan
- Edited by: Pooja Ladha Surti
- Music by: Score: Daniel B. George; Songs: Amit Trivedi; Guest Composers: Raftaar; Girish Nakod
- Production companies: Viacom 18 Motion Pictures; Matchbox Pictures
- Distributed by: Viacom 18 Motion Pictures
- Release date: 5 October 2018 (India)
- Running time: 138 minutes
- Country: India
- Language: Hindi
- Budget: ₹32 crore
- Box office: est. ₹456.89 crore

Andhadhun (pronounced [əndʱaːdʱʊn] transl. Indiscriminate, blind, reckless, or without thinking) (Note: The title is a play on the Hindi word andhadhund, which means reckless or relentless, and "a play on blind tune and trance".) is a 2018 Indian Hindi-language black comedy crime thriller film co-written and directed by Sriram Raghavan. It stars Tabu, Ayushmann Khurrana, Radhika Apte and Anil Dhawan. The film tells the story of a blind piano player who unwittingly becomes embroiled in the murder of a retired actor.

The script of Andhadhun was written by Raghavan, Arijit Biswas, Pooja Ladha Surti, Yogesh Chandekar and Hemanth M. Rao. The film was edited by Surti, and K. U. Mohanan was its director of photography. Amit Trivedi composed songs for the film and Jaideep Sahni wrote the lyrics; Raftaar and Girish Nakod co-wrote the title song as guest composers, while Daniel B. George composed the background score. The film was shot in Pune in 44 days spread over more than a year; principal photography began in June 2017 and ended on 17 July 2018.

Andhadhun was released by Viacom18 Motion Pictures theatrically in India on 5 October 2018 to widespread critical acclaim. It won four Screen Awards, including Best Director and Best Screenplay, at the Screen Awards ceremony and five Filmfare Awards, including Best Film (Critics) and Best Actor (Critics) for Khurrana. It also won three National Film Awards: Best Feature Film in Hindi, Best Actor for Khurrana, and Best Screenplay. Grossing over ₹457 crore (US$64.9 million) at the worldwide box office, it became the fourth highest-grossing Indian film of 2018, and was remade in Telugu as Maestro (2021), in Malayalam as Bhramam (2021) and in Tamil as Andhagan (2024).

== Plot ==
Akash Saraf is a Pune-based pianist who feigns visual impairment as an artistic experiment to refine his musical focus. While navigating a street, he is knocked over by a young woman named Sophie. Impressed by his apparent musical talent, Sophie secures him a regular engagement at her father's diner. Although Akash initially utilizes opaque contact lenses during his practice sessions, his growing affection for Sophie prompts him to discard them, choosing instead to simply simulate blindness. The two soon begin a romantic relationship. At the diner, Pramod Sinha, a wealthy, retired actor, notices Akash's skill and hires him for a private performance at his apartment to celebrate his wedding anniversary.

When Akash arrives at the residence, Pramod's wife, Simi, reluctantly lets him in to avoid arousing the suspicion of a nosy neighbor. Upon entering, Akash immediately discovers Pramod's corpse on the floor. Forced to maintain his facade of blindness to protect his life, Akash continues to play the piano while feigning absolute ignorance. He watches as Simi and her hidden paramour—Manohar, a muscular police inspector—clean the crime scene and stuff the body into a suitcase. Disturbed by the ordeal, Akash leaves the building and encounters Sakhu, a lottery ticket seller with a distinctive Lord Shiva tattoo, who helps him hail an auto-rickshaw driven by a man named Murli.

Akash attempts to report the homicide at the local precinct, but he aborts the mission upon discovering that Manohar is the inspector in charge of the station. He quickly improvises a false report about a missing pet cat to escape. Meanwhile, an elderly neighbor, Mrs. D'Sa, informs the police that she witnessed an unfamiliar man entering the Sinhas' apartment on the day of the murder. To silence her, Simi pushes Mrs. D'Sa off the building's ledge. Akash arrives for a scheduled piano lesson just in time to witness the fatal fall, but he is forced to continue his blind act. Soon after, a skeptical neighborhood child surreptitiously records a video of Akash exercising full visual awareness.

Simi visits Akash's apartment under the guise of offering temple sweets, which she has laced with a potent drug. After exposing his fraud by catching him off guard, she blinds him with a chemical solution and drugs him into unconsciousness. While Akash is incapacitated, the neighbor's child exposes the video to Sophie. Sophie rushes to the apartment, but Simi deftly manipulates the scene to make it appear as though she and Akash are having an affair, causing a heartbroken Sophie to abandon him. Manohar later infiltrates the apartment to eliminate Akash, but the newly blinded pianist narrowly escapes, knocking himself unconscious against a telephone pole during his flight.

Akash awakens in an illicit organ-harvesting clinic managed by a corrupt doctor, Dr. Swami, and his assistants, who happen to be Murli and Sakhu. When Akash mentions Sakhu's specific tattoo—which he noted before losing his sight—the trio realizes he was not originally blind and decides to spare him. Akash proposes a lucrative blackmail scheme involving Simi's complicity in the murder. They kidnap Simi, fabricate a suicide note, and demand a massive ransom from Manohar. However, Murli and Sakhu double-cross Akash, binding him alongside Simi to claim the entire payout for themselves. The extortion plot collapses when Manohar ambushes the drop-off point, shooting Murli before accidentally killing himself inside a malfunctioning elevator. Furthermore, the ransom money is revealed to be counterfeit.

Simi assists Akash in freeing himself from his bonds. However, once her blindfold is removed, she betrays him and mounts a violent attack. Dr. Swami intervenes, helping Akash subdue Simi. They lock her in the trunk of a vehicle and drive toward Mumbai, where Swami plans to harvest Simi's organs for a wealthy client and use her corneas to restore Akash's vision. When Simi regains consciousness, she breaks into the cabin, overpowers Swami, and takes control of the vehicle. Akash, unaware that Swami has been incapacitated, continues to plead for Simi's release.

Two years later, Sophie encounters Akash performing at a high-end gig in Kraków, Poland. Akash narrates the entire sequence of events to her, claiming that after Swami was neutralized, Simi ejected him from the vehicle and attempted to run him over. However, a stray hare struck her windshield, causing her to lose control of the car, which crashed and burst into flames. Sophie comforts him, noting that he should have accepted the doctor's offer to harvest her corneas. As Akash walks away, he uses his cane to cleanly strike a beverage can out of his path, strongly implying that his vision was restored using Simi's corneas and that his current blindness is yet another facade.

== Cast ==
The cast is listed below:

- Tabu as Simi Sinha
- Ayushmann Khurrana as Akash Sarraf
- Radhika Apte as Sophie
- Anil Dhawan as Pramod Sinha
- Zakir Hussain as Dr. Krishna Swami
- Ashwini Kalsekar as Rasika Jawanda
- Manav Vij as Inspector Manohar Jawanda
- Chhaya Kadam as Sakhu
- Pawan Singh as Murli
- Mohini Kewalramani as Mrs. D'SA
- Gopal K. Singh as Sub-Inspector Paresh Kadam
- Rashmi Agdekar as Daani Sinha
- Kabir Sajid Sheikh as Bandu
- Rudrangshu Chakrabarti as Murli
- Pratik Nandkumar More as Surya
- Mahesh Rale as P. Kamdar
- Abhishek Shukla as Animal Hunter
- Jaydutt Vyas as Alurkar
- Girdhar Swami

== Production ==
=== Development ===
Director-writer Sriram Raghavan saw L'Accordeur (The Piano Tuner), a 2010 French short film about a blind pianist, in 2013 at the recommendation of his friend, filmmaker Hemanth M Rao. Raghavan said although his film is different, the French film was its "basic germ". He wanted Rao to write a script based on the short but Rao was directing a film of his own. Raghavan then worked on Badlapur (2015) and had the "gist of the story". After reading about Kaabil, which is also about a blind man, he was about to start writing but stopped, thinking having two films about blind people would be "crazy". Raghavan later resumed the script, taking a different approach.

The idea of a blind pianist performing while a body is being dumped and a crime scene cleaned up fascinated Raghavan, who had written a similar scene for his previous film, Agent Vinod (2012), in which a blind girl plays the piano while surrounded by mayhem. Raghavan wrote the script with Arijit Biswas, Yogesh Chandekar, Rao and Pooja Ladha Surti. He gave the story idea to Varun Dhawan while they were working on Badlapur but Dhawan became busy with other films and the script was left unfinished. Negotiations with Suriya and Harshvardhan Kapoor also fell through. Raghavan discussed the scenes with the writers, who reacted as viewers.

Raghavan and Biswas were unhappy while translating the dialogue from English to Hindi because they thought in English. Raghavan told Biswas to write the dramatic dialogue in Bengali, which was "at least the Indian idiom". Surti wrote another version of the dialogue because her Hindi was better than that of the others. Raghavan cited the 1996 film Fargo and the eponymous television series as an inspiration, calling them "realistic and yet ... bizarre". One of his friends was in a situation similar to one in the film; he then realised old Hindi films use "piano songs" and decided make the blind pianist the main character.

=== Casting ===
Ayushmann Khurrana heard about the film from casting directors Mukesh Chhabra and Girdhar Swami. He contacted Raghavan, expressing interest in working on it. Raghavan conducted screen tests of the scene in which the protagonist wakes up blind: "There were two pieces – when you are acting blind and when you are actually blind, and we tried both. I wanted to see what the difference in his body language would be." Khurrana, who played the piano in the film, met several blind students and observed "how [a blind pianist] plays, conducts and moves his hands". Khurrana studied piano for four hours daily under Akshay Verma, a pianist based in Los Angeles, and did not use a body double in the film. He called it the "most challenging role" of his career. Khurrana was also trained by visually impaired musician Rahul Gajjal as part of the film.

Raghavan told Khurrana not to watch films with a blind protagonist and took him to the National School of the Blind. He said, "Since no two persons are the same, I picked up the nuances, learnt how to hold the stick and climb the stairs". Khurrana made omelettes and walked on the street blindfolded. He was given a pair of special lenses that impaired his vision by around 80 percent. His body language changed because he could no longer see properly. After wearing the black glasses, his vision was affected by 90 percent and he shot the entire film like that. Raghavan called Radhika Apte, who agreed to play Khurrana's love interest. Several scenes were improvised. Tabu was Raghavan's first choice for Simi. He did not brief her about scenes and they "kept developing [the character] as it went". Anil Dhawan played a former actor, a version of himself.

Raghavan said he wanted to make a "fun sort of thriller" to follow Badlapur. According to him, Andhadhun is not a whodunit; " ... The audience knows all along what's happening and why. It's the characters who don't." Raghavan and the film's director of photography K. U. Mohanan decided to "restrict everything to Akash's point of view" so the audience could see what Akash sees. There were no close-ups in the piano-playing scene, which was extensively rehearsed with several assistants to fit its timing into the four-minute piano piece. It was not rehearsed with the actors; Raghavan told them to "just do the scene" and gave them a time frame; "We didn't want it to look practiced; we needed that uncertainty". The film's first shot was rehearsed with Khurrana for three months. Raghavan called Andhadhun "a fun film in the macabre sense of the word", with moments of "wickedness and brutality".

Raghavan wanted the film to have an open ending and considered several options. Both the Viacom 18 and Matchbox Pictures production teams were apprehensive about the audience acceptance of an open ending but Raghavan persuaded them. Its working title was Shoot the Piano Player, which was changed because the producers felt an English title would "alienate people". The title is a play on the word andhadhund, which means reckless or relentless, and "a play on blind tune and trance". The film was edited by Surti, and Snigdha Karmahe, Pankaj Pol and Anita Donald were its production designers.

=== Filming ===
The film was shot in Pune, Maharashtra, over 44 days across more than a year, with principal photography beginning in June 2017 and concluding on 17 July 2018. Filming locations included Prabhat Road, where the protagonist's residence is located, as well as Cafe Goodluck and Victory Theatre in the Camp area. Portions of the film involving the characters Pramod Sinha and Simi were shot in Magarpatta City.

== Music ==
The title track of the soundtrack of Andhadhun was composed and written by Raftaar and Girish Nakod, and Amit Trivedi composed the remainder of it. The album's lyrics were written by Jaideep Sahni, Raftaar and Nakod. It was released on 5 September 2018 on the Zee Music Company record label. Vocals were provided by Trivedi, Raftaar, Ayushmann Khurrana, Arijit Singh, Abhijeet Srivastava, Aakansha Sharma, Shadab Faridi and Altamash Faridi. The background score was composed by Daniel B. George. The album received a mainly positive response from critics.

== Release ==
Andhadhun was scheduled for release on 31 August 2018 but its release was postponed until 5 October; the producers announced the delay in a trailer. Raghavan originally wanted the film's trailer to only contain sounds because it is the story of a blind man but the studio was "shocked" at his suggestion. After several discussions, they agreed on a trailer. Raghavan "didn't want to give away too many things about the film" in the trailer and the studio eventually accepted his view. The trailer was released on 2 September 2018.

The film was released on 800 screens across India, and is available on Netflix and JioCinema. It was screened at the 2019 Indian Film Festival of Los Angeles where Tabu was honoured. Andhadhun was released in China as Piano Player on 3 April 2019. On 28 August 2019, the film was released in South Korea in over 90 screens.

== Reception ==
=== Critical response ===
On the review aggregator website Rotten Tomatoes, Andhadhun holds a rating of 100% based on 15 reviews, with an average rating of 7.7/10.

Andhadhun garnered widespread critical acclaim. Raja Sen of The Hindustan Times rated the film 5 out of 5 stars and called it a "rare treat" and a film that is "so compelling that it may universally be considered irresistible". Anna M. M. Vetticad of Firstpost rated the film 4.5 out of 5 stars and wrote "Sriram Raghavan's Andhadhun should rank among the most fascinating and fun suspense thrillers ever to emerge from Bollywood". Sukanya Verma of Rediff rated the film 4.5 out of 5 stars and wrote "Andhadhun is a stunning, comic, grisly, absurd, intense, cold, crazy". Saibal Chatterjee of NDTV rated the film 4 out of 5 stars and wrote, "Watch Andhadhun with your ears, eyes and minds open. You will come away with your senses heightened." Rajeev Masand of News 18 rated the film 4 out of 5 stars and called it a film with "many pleasures ... chief among them is the thrill of being constantly surprised". He praised Khurrana's and Tabu's performances, calling them "in solid form" and "towering". Renuka Vyavahare of The Times of India rated the film 4 out of 5 stars and gave the film a positive review, calling it an "engaging thriller that keeps you on your toes and leaves you guessing all the way". Umesh Punwani of Koimoi rated the film 4 out of 5 stars and wrote "Andhadhun also proves one thing why no high budget is required when you've such a strong script in hand". IANS of The Free Press Journal rated the film 4 out of 5 stars and wrote "Director Sriram Raghavan’s Andhadhun is a taut, skillful and surgically effective murder mystery". Ankur Pathak of HuffPost cited it as "the best film of 2018 so far" and "a film worth watching and then rewatching".

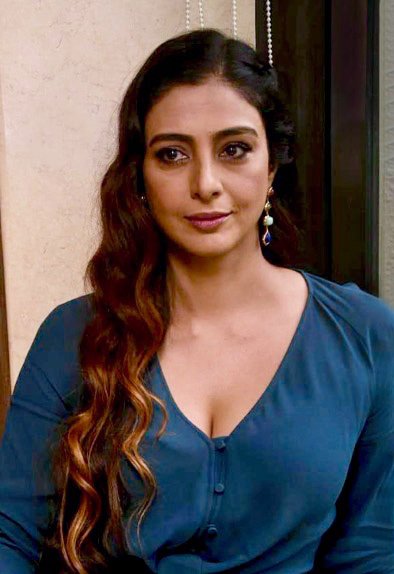
Several critics took note of Tabu's performance in the film

Shilajit Mitra of The New Indian Express rated the film 4 out of 5 stars and said in a review that "Raghavan creates a world interchangeably familiar and pulpy" in which he "strings together ingenious set-pieces and populates them with wryly-written characters". Shubhra Gupta of The Indian Express rated the film 3.5 out of 5 stars and called Andhadhun "racy, pacy and appropriately pulpy" but said it becomes a "tad heavy-handed and dull" after a while. Devesh Shamrma of Filmfare rated the film 3.5 out of 5 stars and wrote "Andhadhun has a zig zag storyline and spot on acting by the entire cast. It"s one of those mysteries which you"ll like to go back to despite knowing the ending". Shibaji Roychoudhury of Times Now said the second half was predictable and "falls flat" but called the film "thrilling, full of compelling performances and exceptional sound design that will keep you at the edge of your seat". Sushant Mehta of India Today rated the film 3.5 out of 5 stars and wrote, "Raghavan's ability to shock an entire cinema hall including the most immovable, emotionless fan coupled with his ability to make the audience laugh during these moments where your heart is in your mouth defines his unique brand of cinema". Nandini Ramnath of Scroll.in rated the film 3.5 out of 5 stars and wrote that the film has a "strong flavour of the Coen brothers at their peak, but also enough nods to Raghavan's longstanding interest in the dynamics of the perfect crime and the hustlers and flimflam artists who populate pulp detective stories". She said although the film's runtime was a stretch, it "slides into place as smoothly as one of Akash's piano pieces".

Anupama Chopra wrote, "The surroundings – high-rises, leafy streets and old houses in Pune – seem perfectly normal but what's happening inside is deliciously twisted. There's murder, betrayal, sex and a mountain of lies. In short, you can't look away." Udita Jhunjhunwala of Mint praised Khurrana's acting, calling it a "taut performance that balances vulnerability with craftiness", and said Tabu "runs away with the show". Shaheen Irani of Deccan Chronicle wrote, "Sriram has done a fab job in keeping dark humour intact with several quirky and surprise elements that will make you cover your face too".

Troy Ribeiro of Indo-Asian News Service called the film a "taut, skillful and surgically effective murder mystery" and said; "For most of its length, Andhadhun functions so efficiently that we put the cause and its effects on hold and go with the action". Manjusha Radhakrishnan of Gulf News described the film as an "unapologetic celebration of vitriol, darkness and mean-spiritedness". Namrata Joshi wrote, "While seemingly giving things away, Raghavan is actually always a step ahead of the viewers in the cat-and-mouse game".

Poulomi Das of Arre also gave Andhadhun a positive review, saying; "The film is all about clever writing, top-notch execution, and hard-hitting social commentary – but it is also a triumph of casting, and an ode to actors". Shilpa Jamkhandikar of Reuters said "Andhadhun ticks all the right boxes" that should be "savoured." Kumar Shyam of The National wrote, "Drawing the viewers into multiple situations of right and wrong, black and white and then shades of grey, the climax also ends on a similar note with a deliberate climax, typical Hitchcockian, between salvation and revelation". Stutee Ghosh of The Quint said, "Andhadhun deserves praise and full attention ... Make sure to not miss anything, not the opening scene nor the end credits". Anita Iyer of Khaleej Times called the film a "crisply-edited, fast-paced narrative that keeps you on the edge of the seat throughout". J. Hurtado of Screen Anarchy said; "Andhadhun shows that this veteran director knows how to make this kind of twisty genre gem better than almost anyone in India". He included it in his list of 14 Favorite Indian Films of 2018.

=== Box office ===
Andhadhun earned ₹2.5 crore (US$365,553.19) on its first day of release. The film's box office take increased with positive word of mouth and it grossed ₹5.1 crore (US$745,728.51) on its second day. It earned ₹15 crore (US$2.19 million) in its first weekend and grossed ₹41.1 crore (US$6.01 million) in ten days. The film became profitable before its theatrical release through the sale of its satellite television rights, which were sold to Colors. At the end of its six-week theatrical run, Andhadhun had earned ₹101 crore (US$14.77 million) at the box office, mainly from Mumbai. The film also did well internationally, earning ₹10.4 crore (US$1.52 million).

Prior to its release in China, Andhadhun had grossed ₹106 crore (US$15.5 million) worldwide, including ₹95.63 crore (US$13.98 million) in India and ₹10.37 crore (US$1.52 million) overseas. In China, the film surpassed its Indian lifetime collection within six days. Andhadhun has grossed ₹335 crore (US$47.57 million) in China, for a worldwide total of ₹456.89 crore (US$64.88 million).

=== Accolades ===
Date of ceremony	Award	Category	Recipient(s) and nominee(s)	Result	Ref.
16 December 2018	Screen Awards	Best Director	Sriram Raghavan	Won	
16 December 2018	Screen Awards	Best Screenplay	Arijit Biswas, Sriram Raghavan, Pooja Ladha Surti	Won	
16 December 2018	Screen Awards	Best Editing	Pooja Ladha Surti	Won	
16 December 2018	Screen Awards	Best Sound Design	Madhu Apsara	Won	
16 February 2019	Asiavision Awards	Best Actor (Critics)	Ayushmann Khurrana (also for Badhaai Ho)	Won	
19 March 2019	Zee Cine Awards	Best Actor (Viewer's Choice)	Ayushmann Khurrana	Won	
19 March 2019	Zee Cine Awards	Best Actress in a Negative Role	Tabu	Won	
19 March 2019	Zee Cine Awards	Best Editing	Pooja Ladha Surti	Won	
19 March 2019	Zee Cine Awards	Best Film Writing	Arijit Biswas, Pooja Ladha Surti, Sriram Raghavan, Yogesh Chandekar, Hemanth M. Rao	Won	
19 March 2019	Zee Cine Awards	Best Background Score	Daniel B. George	Won	
23 March 2019	Filmfare Awards	Best Film	Viacom18 Motion Pictures, Kewal Garg, Sanjay Routary and Sriram Raghavan	Nominated	
23 March 2019	Filmfare Awards	Best Film (Critics)	Sriram Raghavan	Won	
23 March 2019	Filmfare Awards	Best Director	Sriram Raghavan	Nominated	
23 March 2019	Filmfare Awards	Best Actor	Ayushmann Khurrana	Nominated	
23 March 2019	Filmfare Awards	Best Actor (Critics)	Ayushmann Khurrana	Won	
23 March 2019	Filmfare Awards	Best Actress	Tabu	Nominated	
23 March 2019	Filmfare Awards	Best Actress (Critics)	Tabu	Nominated	
23 March 2019	Filmfare Awards	Best Screenplay	Sriram Raghavan, Arijit Biswas, Pooja Ladha Surti, Yogesh Chandekar, Hemanth M. Rao	Won	
23 March 2019	Filmfare Awards	Best Editing	Pooja Ladha Surti	Won	
23 March 2019	Filmfare Awards	Best Sound Design	Madhu Apsara	Nominated	
23 March 2019	Filmfare Awards	Best Background Score	Daniel B. George	Won	
9 August 2019	National Film Awards	Best Hindi Film	Andhadhun	Won	
9 August 2019	National Film Awards	Best Adapted Screenplay	Andhadhun	Won	
9 August 2019	National Film Awards	Best Actor	Ayushmann Khurrana	Won	
18 September 2019	International Indian Film Academy Awards	Best Film	Viacom18 Motion Pictures	Nominated	
18 September 2019	International Indian Film Academy Awards	Best Director	Sriram Raghavan	Won	
18 September 2019	International Indian Film Academy Awards	Best Actor	Ayushmann Khurrana	Nominated	
18 September 2019	International Indian Film Academy Awards	Best Actress	Tabu	Nominated	
18 September 2019	International Indian Film Academy Awards	Best Supporting Actress	Radhika Apte	Nominated	
18 September 2019	International Indian Film Academy Awards	Best Music Director	Amit Trivedi	Nominated	
18 September 2019	International Indian Film Academy Awards	Best Male Playback Singer	Amit Trivedi (For "Naina Da Kya Kasoor")	Nominated	
18 September 2019	International Indian Film Academy Awards	Best Lyricist	Jaideep Sahni (For "Naina Da Kya Kasoor")	Nominated	
18 September 2019	International Indian Film Academy Awards	Best Story	Sriram Raghavan, Arijit Biswas, Pooja Ladha Surti, Yogesh Chandekar & Hemanth M. Rao	Won	
18 September 2019	International Indian Film Academy Awards	Best Screenplay	Sriram Raghavan, Arijit Biswas, Pooja Ladha Surti, Yogesh Chandekar & Hemanth M. Rao	Won	
18 September 2019	International Indian Film Academy Awards	Best Editing	Pooja Ladha Surti	Won	
18 September 2019	International Indian Film Academy Awards	Best Background Score	Daniel B. George	Won	
18 September 2019	International Indian Film Academy Awards	Best Sound Mixing	Ajay Kumar PB	Won	
22 November 2019	Bandung Film Festival	Honorable Imported Films	Andhadhun	Won	
4 December 2019	AACTA Awards	Best Asian Film	Sriram Raghavan, Sanjay Rautray, Keval Garg	Nominated	

== Remakes ==
In 2021, Andhadhun was remade in Telugu as Maestro and in Malayalam as Bhramam. A Tamil remake, Andhagan, was released in 2024.
