= Minnale (soundtrack) =

2001 soundtrack album by Harris Jayaraj

Soundtrack album by Harris Jayaraj
- Released: 11 January 2001
- Genre: Feature film soundtrack
- Length: 32:26
- Language: Tamil
- Labels: Saregama; Cee (I) TV Audio; Ayngaran Music; An Ak Audio
- Producer: Harris Jayaraj

Harris Jayaraj chronology
Minnale (2001)	Rehnaa Hai Terre Dil Mein (2001)
External audio
- Official Audio Jukebox on YouTube

Minnale is the debut soundtrack album composed by Harris Jayaraj for the 2001 Indian Tamil-language film of the same name, starring Madhavan, Abbas, Reema, Vivek and Nagesh, and directed by Gautham Vasudev Menon in his directorial debut. The film's soundtrack comprised nine songs, written by Vaali, Thamarai and C. S. Amudhan.

The soundtrack which was distributed by Saregama and Cee (I) TV Audio, was released at a function held in Chennai and received critical acclaim, thus becoming a major contributor to the success of the film. It also fetched Jayaraj his first Filmfare Award for Best Music Director in Tamil, which is the second time ever for a debutant after A. R. Rahman for Roja (1992). The song "Vaseegara" became a chartbuster, and also served as breakthrough for the lyricist Thamarai, and carnatic musician Bombay Jayashri, who later became a prominent playback singer in films. The soundtrack was covered in Telugu as Cheli, with lyrics written by Bhuvanachandra. Harris Jayaraj reused five tracks in the Hindi remake of the film Rehna Hai Tere Dil Mein, excluding four songs from the original and also composed two tracks originally for the film.

== Development ==
Before his debut as music composer, Harris worked as an instrumentalist, synthesizer and keyboard programmer for more than 600 films and with various composers ranging from A. R. Rahman to Yuvan Shankar Raja. While Menon roped in Harris, for the film's soundtrack, he wanted to ensure the quality of the music production, not only for the songs but also for the film score, as songs constitute only 25 minutes of the film's runtime, than its score, which will be about two hours. The album and score in its entirety was recorded within 11 months. Apart from composition, Harris Jayaraj took charge in programming, recording, mixing and mastering of the songs, as well as dubbing, when the film and its soundtrack was covered and released in Telugu as Cheli. Initially, producer Kalaipuli Thanu wanted Harris to score for Kamal Haasan-starrer Aalavandhan, in his debut, but Harris refused to do so as he owed to work with Menon.

"Vaseegara" was the first song composed by Harris Jayaraj for the film, which is set in Natabhairavi raga. Jayaraj approached Carnatic-musician Bombay Jayashri to record the song, during which Jayashri arrived in Chennai from Coimbatore by train and received a phone call from the composer, addressing him as Mr. Jayaraj. She presumed it was Malayalam director Jayaraj with whom she had worked before in movies such as Paithrukam and Kudumbasametham, but later came to know as Harris Jayaraj. Harris played the tune first and asked Jayashri to sing, with lyricist Thamarai too joined the session. The recording of the song finished within two hours. The track "Venmathiye" is a peppy but sad track, which was reflected in the lyrics of poet Vaali, set in Darbari kaanada raga.

A part of the background score is based on Joan Jett's version of "I Love Rock 'n' Roll".

== Track listing ==
=== Tamil ===
Minnale
No.	Title	Lyrics	Singer(s)	Length
1.	"Azhagiya Theeye"	Vaalee	Harish Raghavendra, Timmy	5:56
2.	"Orey Nyabagam"	Thamarai	Devan Ekambaram	1:56
3.	"Maddy Maddy"	C. S. Amudhan	Karthik, Timmy	1:15
4.	"Vaseegara"	Thamarai	Bombay Jayashree	5:00
5.	"Oh Mama Mama"	Vaalee	Shankar Mahadevan, Tippu	4:40
6.	"Poopol Poopol"	Thamarai	Karthik, Tippu	1:57
7.	"Nenjai Poopol"	Thamarai	Harish Raghavendra	1:01
8.	"Venmathiye"	Vaalee	Roop Kumar Rathod, Tippu	5:28
9.	"Ivan Yaaro"	Thamarai	Unni Krishnan, Harini	5:13
Total length:				32:26

=== Telugu ===
All tracks are written by Bhuvanachandra.

Cheli
No.	Title	Singer(s)	Length
1.	"Ningiki Jabili Andam"	Unni Krishnan, Harini	5:24
2.	"Kannulu Neevi"	Naveen	1:55
3.	"Varshinche Megam La Ne Nunna"	Srinivas, Timmy, Vasu	5:27
4.	"Manohara"	Bombay Jayashree	5:00
5.	"Aei Vennella Sona"	Harish Raghavendra, Timmy	5:47
6.	"Ooh Mama"	Mano, Timmy, Vasu, Chandran	4:36
7.	"Manohara" (Part 2)	Bombay Jayashree	4:57
Total length:			33:06

== Release, reception and influence ==
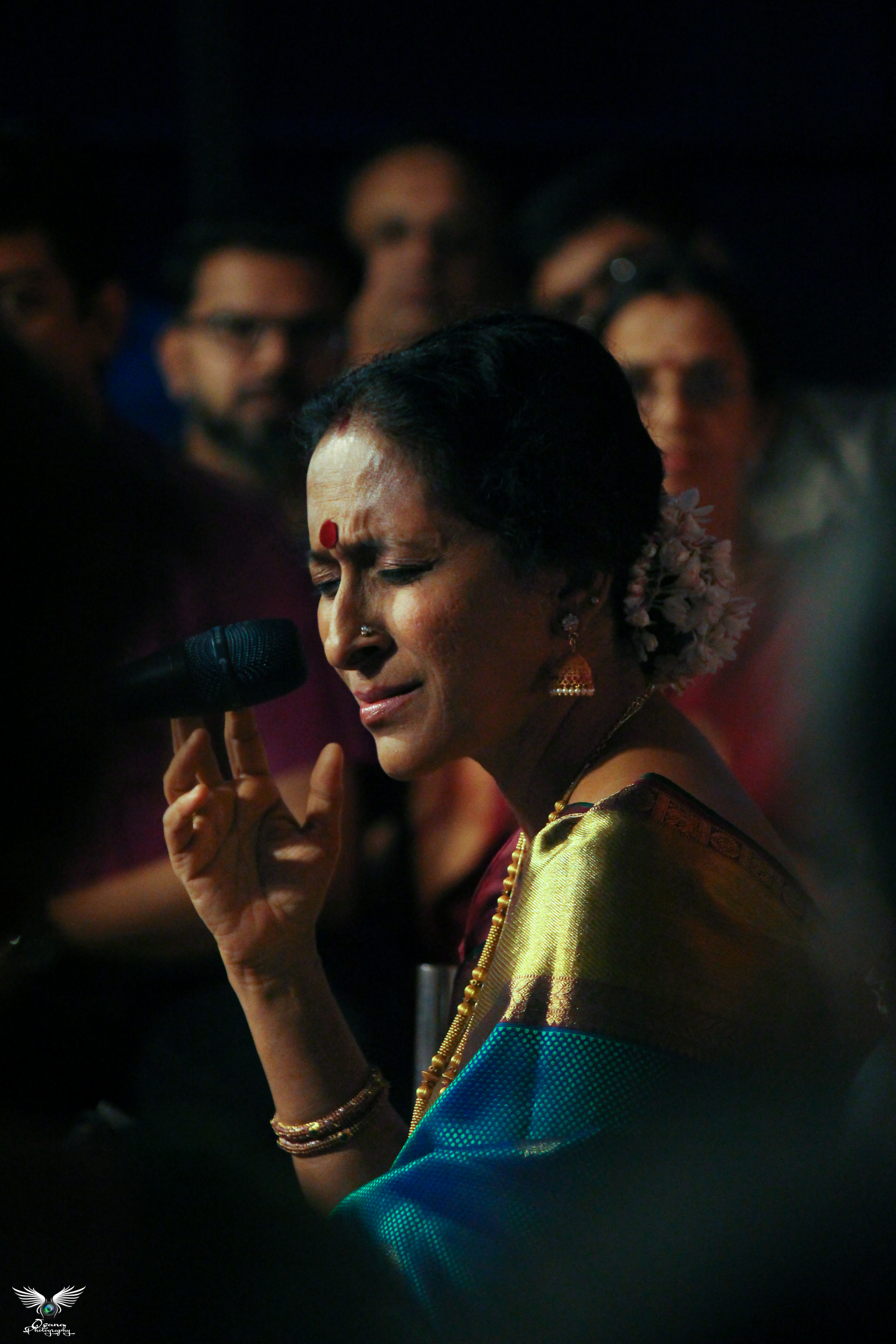
The album emerged as a breakthrough for Carnatic musician Bombay Jayashri, who became a leading playback singer in films.

A promotional event to distribute the film's audio cassettes and CDs was held at Sathyam Cinemas, Chennai on 12 January 2001 with the film's songs were also screened. Actors Madhavan, Vivek, Vikram and Manoj Bharathiraja among other celebrities from the film industry were present at the event, excluding Reema and Abbas, who could not attend the function due to busy schedules. The composer's musical team performed the songs on stage, with dance choreographer Brinda's team danced to the tunes.

The soundtrack received critical acclaim and was a major contributor to the film's commercial success. In its review for The Hindu, Savitha Padmanabhan praised the film's music and picturisation as "stylish" and "youthful". A critic from Sify, considered the background score and the songs (particularly "Azhagiya Theeye"), as the "highlight" of the film. In the film's 18th anniversary, Abhishek Bachchan replied to one of the ardent fans of the film, praising the film and added that its songs still feel fresh to listen even after several years. Ritz Magazine called "Venmathiye" and one of the best compositions from Harris Jayaraj, as was The Indian Express, while "Vaseegara" was listed as one of the best songs from Harris in the review for The Times of India.

The soundtrack emerged as a breakthrough for Harris Jayaraj, who went on to become one of the leading music directors in the Tamil film music scene, as well as its contributors, lyricist Thamarai and singer Bombay Jayashri, who became a playback singer in films after being known as a carnatic musician. It also led to a successive collaboration between Jayaraj and Menon, who went on collaborate in several of the latter's films, till Vaaranam Aayiram (2008). Songs from the film inspired several film titles – Vaseegara (2003), Azhagiya Theeye (2004) and Ivan Yaaro, which served as the tentative title for Evano Oruvan, starring Madhavan, also inspired a song from the actor's debut film Alai Payuthey. The song "Vaseegara" was reused in the 2003 Kannada film Lovea Illa Doveaa as "Vasundara Ee Prema" and in the 2005 film Sachein.
