= Kheech Meri Photo =

2015 Hindi song

Song by Darshan Raval, Neeti Mohan and Akasa Singh

from the album Sanam Teri Kasam
- Released: 29 December 2015
- Genre: Filmi . Acoustic pop . R&B
- Length: 4:44
- Label: Sony Music
- Composer: Himesh Reshammiya
- Lyricist: Sameer
- Producer: Deepak Mukut

Sanam Teri Kasam track listing
- 1. "Sanam Teri Kasam"; 2. "Tera Chehra"; 3. "Kheech Meri Photo"; 4. "Bewajah"; 5. "Haal-E-Dil"; 6. "Ek Number"; 7. "Main Teri Yaadon Mein"

Music video
- "Kheech Meri Photo" on YouTube

Kheech Meri Photo (transl. Click My Picture) is a romantic Hindi-language dance song from the 2016 film Sanam Teri Kasam. The track is composed by Himesh Reshammiya, with lyrics written by Sameer. The song has been sung by Darshan Raval, Neeti Mohan and Akasa Singh. The music video of the song featured actors Harshvardhan Rane and Mawra Hocane.

== Development ==
Sanam Teri Kasam's songs were composed by Himesh Reshammiya. The lyrics were penned by Sameer Anjaan. The track is sung by Darshan Raval, Neeti Mohan and Akasa Singh, and marks Singh singing debut.

== Release ==
"Kheech Meri Photo" was released on 29 December 2015. The full version was later released with the complete soundtrack on 7 January 2016.

== Critical reception ==
The song received positive reviews from critics. Mohar Basu of The Times of India stated, "Kheech Meri Photo is a fun and peppy number. This song is right out of Neeti's comfort space and Akasa Singh, along with Darshan Raval, support her ably. This song definitely has repeat value."

Aelina Kapoor from Rediff.com noted, "Kheech Meri Photo is a well-paced playful song." Joginder Tuteja of Bollywood Hungama noted, "There is a change in mood immediately with Neeti Mohan taking over the stage with 'Kheech Meri Photo'. This one has the right pace to it and is beautifully endearing, hence making you hear it on a repeat mode. With a 'desi' flavor to it, this one has Akasa Singh & Darshan Raval giving good company to Neeti while enjoying the fun."

== Music rankings ==
"Kheech Meri Photo" was placed in the list of "Bollywood top 15 songs Jan – Jul 2016", by News18 India.

| Chart (2015–16) | Song | Entry position | Peak position | Ref. |
|---|---|---|---|---|
| Asian Music Charts (Official Charts Company) | "Kheech Meri Photo" | 40 | 40 | |

== Song credits ==
Credits adapted from Sony Music's official YouTube site.

Backing vocals

Darshan Raval, Neeti Mohan, Akasa Singh.

Production

- Music producer – Himesh Reshammiya
- Mastering, Mixing and Programming:
  - Salman Shaikh (at HR Musik Studio)
