= Akasa Singh =

Indian singer and performer (born 1994)

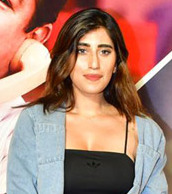
- Singh in 2023
- Born: 2 April 1994 (age 32); Mumbai, Maharashtra, India
- Occupations: Singer; actor
- Musical career
- Genres: Pop; Filmi
- Instrument: Vocals
- Label: Sony Music India

Akasa Singh (born 2 April 1994), known mononymously as Akasa, is an Indian singer and performer. She debuted with "Kheech Meri Photo" from the 2016 Hindi film Sanam Teri Kasam. Starting her career through reality shows, she was signed to Sony Music India. Her debut pop single "Thug Ranjha" was her breakthrough."'Thug Ranjha' is most viewed Indian video worldwide". The Times of India. In 2021, she participated in Bigg Boss 15. Between 2024 and 2026, Akasa expanded her discography with several high-profile film songs and independent projects. In 2024, she featured on the track "Not Funny" from the film Madgaon Express and performed "Daavudi" for the multilingual blockbuster Devara: Part 1 alongside Nakash Aziz. Her 2025 releases included "Panwadi" from Sunny Sanskari Ki Tulsi Kumari, "Sikandar Naache" from Sikandar, and "Dhaagena Tinak Dhin" from the soundtrack of Metro... In Dino. In 2026, she released the single "Jab Talak" for the film Cocktail 2 along side Arijit Singh and Pritam.

Akasa made her television debut as a host for Secret Side on MTV Beats.

== Career ==
Akasa started her career with Mika Singh where she was the only girl in a band of 10 male members. She was a contestant in India's Raw Star. Her mentor on the show, Himesh Reshammiya, promised Akasa that he would give her a break in Bollywood which she got through the song "Kheech Meri Photo" of the 2016 film Sanam Teri Kasam. Akasa was also a contestant in Amazon Prime Video's original reality show The Remix with DJ Skip.

In 2017, Akasa, who has also featured in Being Indian's Judaai and Jugni Ji released a duet with Ricky Martin called Vente Pa Ca. She has also done a mashup of Ed Sheeran's Shape of You and Badshah's Mercy and released a cover version of Zara Zara song from the film RHTDM.

Akasa released her duet single "Thug Ranjha" on 18 May 2018. Along with her, the video featured two male actors, Shasvat Seth and Tiger Zinda Hai actor Paresh Pahuja. The official video went out to be the most viewed Indian video on YouTube worldwide. In 2021, She has participated in Bigg Boss 15.

== Discography ==
=== As playback singer ===
Year	Song	Film	Composer	Lyrics	Language	Notes	Ref.
2013	"Full Jhol"	Jackpot	Mika Singh	Raj Hans	Hindi		
2016	"Kheech Meri Photo"	Sanam Teri Kasam	Himesh Reshammiya	Sameer Anjaan	Hindi	Debut lead song	
2017	"Kudi Gujrat Di"	Sweetiee Weds NRI	Jaidev Kumar	Shyam Bhateja	Hindi		
2017	"Peh Gaya"	Fukrey Returns	Jasleen Royal	Aditya Sharma	Hindi		
2019	"Aithey Aa"	Bharat	Vishal–Shekhar	Irshad Kamil	Hindi		
2019	"Prem Pujari"	Drive	Amartya Bobo Rahut	Siddhant Kaushal	Hindi		
2019	"Dil Na Jaaneya"	Good Newwz	Rochak Kohli	Gurpreet Saini, Ari Leff, Michael Pollock	Hindi		
2020	"Dhak Dhak"	Love Aaj Kal	Pritam	Irshad Kamil	Hindi		
2020	"Peg Sheg"	Bhangra Paa Le	JAM8	JAM8, A Bazz	Hindi		
2021	"Sherni"	Sherni	Utkarsh Dhotekar	Raghav	Hindi		
2022	"Kangan Ruby (House Mix)"	Raksha Bandhan	Himesh Reshammiya	Irshad Kamil	Hindi		
2022	"Hypnotise"	Middle Class Love	Himesh Reshammiya	Mayur Puri	Hindi		
2023	"Selfiee Title Song"	Selfiee	Lijo George-DJ Chetas	Shabbir Ahmed, Azeem Dayani	Hindi	Co-singer: Nakash Aziz, Nikhita Gandhi	
2024	"Not Funny"	Madgaon Express	Sharib-Toshi	Kalim Sheikh	Hindi		
2024	"Daavudi"	Devara: Part 1	Anirudh Ravichander	Ramajogayya Sastry (Telugu), Kausar Munir, Varadaraj Chikkaballapura (Kannada)	Telugu; Hindi; Kannada	Also sang dubbed versions	
2025	"Sikandar Naache"	Sikandar	Pritam, JAM8	Sameer Anjaan	Hindi	Co-sung with Amit Mishra, Siddhaant Miishhraa	
2025	"Dhaagena Tinak Dhin"	Metro... In Dino	Pritam	Mayur Puri	Hindi	Co-singer: Sachet Tandon	
2025	"Maalik - Title Track"	Maalik	Sachin-Jigar	Amitabh Bhattacharya	Hindi	Co-singer: MC Square	
2025	"Panwadi"	Sunny Sanskari Ki Tulsi Kumari	A.P.S	Jairaj	Hindi	Co-singers: Khesari Lal Yadav, Masoom Sharma, Dev Negi, Pritam, Nikhita Gandhi, Siva G	
2026	"Jab Talak"	Cocktail 2	Pritam	Amitabh Bhattacharya	Hindi	Co-singer: Arijit Singh	
2026	"Champagne"	Alpha	Rohansh Pandit and Abeer Pandit	Anvita Dutt	Hindi	Additional vocals: Rohansh Pandit and Abeer Pandit	

=== Singles ===
Year	Title	Co-singer(s)	Composer	Ref.
2018	"Thug Ranjha"	—N/a	Vayu	
2019	"Naagin"	Aastha Gill	Vayu	
2020	"Naiyyo"	Raftaar	Herself, Raftaar, Gonzalo Hermida, Ricardo Lobo	
2021	"Shola"	—N/a	Herself, Charan	
2022	"Kamle"	Yasser Desai	Shantanu Dutta	
2022	"Saamna"	—N/a	Vayu, Stav Beger	
2022	"Shringaar"	Aastha Gill, Raftaar	Vayu	
2023	"Koi Jaye Toh Leh Aaye"	Aasa Singh	Herself, Aasa Singh	
2023	"Kalleyan"	Taaruk Raina	Herself	

== Filmography ==
=== Television ===
Year	Title	Role	Notes	Ref.
2014	India's Raw Star	Contestant		
2018	MTV Beats' Secret Side	Host		
2018	The Remix	Contestant	Amazon Prime Video's reality show	
2021	Bigg Boss 15	Contestant	21st place	

=== Web series ===
Year	Title	Role	Platform	Notes
2023	Chamak	Lata Brar	SonyLIV	
2025	Chamak The Conclusion	Lata Brar	SonyLIV	
