= Jamtara – Sabka Number Ayega =

2020 Indian television series

- Official poster
- Genre: Crime; Drama
- Created by: Soumendra Padhi
- Written by: Trishant Srivastava; Kanishka Singh Deo; Ashwin Verman; Nishank Verma
- Directed by: Soumendra Padhi
- Starring: Amit Sial; Dibyendu Bhattacharya; Aksha Pardasany; Aasif Khan; Anshumaan Pushkar; Sparsh Shrivastava
- Composer: Sidhant Mathur
- Country of origin: India
- Original language: Hindi
- No. of seasons: 2
- No. of episodes: 18

Production
- Producer: Ajit Andhare (Tipping Point)
- Cinematography: Kaushal Shah
- Editor: Zubin Sheikh
- Camera setup: Multi-camera

Original release
- Network: Netflix
- Release: 10 January 2020 – present

Jamtara – Sabka Number Ayega stylised as Jamta₹a is an Indian crime drama television series created and directed by Soumendra Padhi and written by Trishant Srivastava. The story revolves around the social engineering operations in the Jamtara district of Jharkhand. It was released on Netflix on 10 January 2020. The second season premiered on 23 September 2022.

== Main cast ==
- Amit Sial as MLA Brajesh Bhaan
- Dibyendu Bhattacharya as Inspector Biswa Paathak
- Aksha Pardasany as SP Dolly Sahu
- Sparsh Srivastav as Sunny Mondal
- Anshumaan Pushkar as Rocky Mondal
- Aasif Khan as Anas Ahmad

== Synopsis ==
The story revolves a bunch of small-town young men who operate a successful phishing racket, until they come across a corrupt politician who wants a share of their business. Eventually, a newly appointed police superintendent decides to take down the entire illicit industry.

== Series overview ==
No. overall	Season	No. in season	Title	Director	Runtime (minutes)
1	Season 1	1	Episode 1	Soumendra Padhi	35
2	Season 1	2	Episode 2	Soumendra Padhi	27
3	Season 1	3	Episode 3	Soumendra Padhi	24
4	Season 1	4	Episode 4	Soumendra Padhi	23
5	Season 1	5	Episode 5	Soumendra Padhi	27
6	Season 1	6	Episode 6	Soumendra Padhi	25
7	Season 1	7	Episode 7	Soumendra Padhi	30
8	Season 1	8	Episode 8	Soumendra Padhi	25
9	Season 1	9	Episode 9	Soumendra Padhi	24
10	Season 1	10	Episode 10	Soumendra Padhi	49
11	Season 2	1	Episode 1	Soumendra Padhi	42
12	Season 2	2	Episode 2	Soumendra Padhi	37
13	Season 2	3	Episode 3	Soumendra Padhi	37
14	Season 2	4	Episode 4	Soumendra Padhi	40
15	Season 2	5	Episode 5	Soumendra Padhi	40
16	Season 2	6	Episode 6	Soumendra Padhi	41
17	Season 2	7	Episode 7	Soumendra Padhi	47
18	Season 2	8	Episode 8	Soumendra Padhi	54

== Production ==
In 2015, Padhi read an article about the phishing operations carried out by school children in Jamtara district which sparked his interest. He sent his writing team to do research. The character of female SP Dolly Sahu was based on Jamtara's Superintendent Jaya Roy.

== Reception ==
Kirubhakar Purushothaman of The New Indian Express said that the plot of the series is "tightly-written and disseminates information seamlessly, hooking us from the word go." Udita Jhunjunwala of Scroll.in called it "extremely binge-able" and wrote: "The characterisation and dynamics of Jamtara land somewhere in the realm of the Anurag Kashyap meets Tigmanshu Dhulia universe."

Tanisha Bagchi of The Quint wrote: "Had the narrative been more layered, Jamtara would have been a huge feather in the cap for Netflix, which has churned out disappointing originals such as Chopsticks, Drive, Ghost Stories, etc." Rohan Nahar of Hindustan Times gave a positive review and said that the "underdog series washes away the stench of recent big-budget failures" for Netflix.
