= The Bhootnii =

2025 Indian film by Sidhaant Sachdev

- Theatrical release poster
- Directed by: Sidhaant Sachdev
- Written by: Sidhaant Sachdev
- Screenplay by: Vankush Arora; Sidhaant Sachdev
- Produced by: Deepak Mukut; Hunar Mukut; Sanjay Dutt; Maanayata Dutt
- Starring: Sanjay Dutt; Sunny Singh; Mouni Roy; Palak Tiwari
- Cinematography: Santhosh Thundiyil
- Edited by: Bunty Nagi
- Music by: Songs: Iconyk; UpsideDown; Shabbir Ahmed; Mukund Suryawanshi; Shashi; Score: Amar Mohile
- Production company: Soham Rockstar Entertainment; Three Dimension Motion Pictures
- Distributed by: Zee Studios
- Release date: 1 May 2025
- Running time: 130 minutes
- Country: India
- Language: Hindi

The Bhootnii (transl. The Ghostess) is a 2025 Indian Hindi-language comedy horror film written and directed by Sidhaant Sachdev and produced by Deepak Mukut and Sanjay Dutt. The film stars Dutt with Sunny Singh, Mouni Roy and Palak Tiwari.

The Bhootnii was released on 1 May 2025.

== Plot ==
Set in the fictional St. Vincent College in Delhi, the story revolves around the legend of the "Virgin Tree," which is believed to grant true love to those who pray beneath it on Valentine's Day. However, every year on Holika Dahan, a student mysteriously dies, their soul claimed by a vengeful spirit.

Shantanu, heartbroken after a recent breakup, seeks solace beneath the Virgin Tree, yearning for true love. His plea awakens Mohabbat, a ghost who becomes infatuated with him. As Mohabbat's obsession deepens, she begins to haunt anyone who comes between her and Shantanu, leading to a series of eerie events on campus.

To combat the escalating supernatural occurrences, the college administration enlists Baba, a seasoned para-physicist and alumnus of the institution. Armed with unconventional gadgets, Baba investigates the mystery, uncovering Mohabbat's tragic past and her connection to the college.

== Cast ==
- Sanjay Dutt as Baba
- Mouni Roy as Karishma aka Mohabbat
- Sunny Singh as Shantanu
- Palak Tiwari as Ananya
- Sahil Arora as Sahil
- Aasif Khan as Nasir
- Meherzan Mazda as Karishma's boyfriend

== Production ==
The Bhootnii was jointly produced by Deepak Mukut, Hunna Mukut, and Sanjay Dutt under the banner of Soham Rockstar Entertainment in association with Three Dimension Motion Pictures. The film was distributed by Zee Studios. Cinematography was handled by Santosh Thundiyil, while Bunty Nagi managed the editing. Post-production and VFX work extended into April 2025, leading to the film's release date being postponed from 18 April to 1 May 2025. The movie was primarily shot in the Delhi-NCR region, with key scenes filmed at a fictional college campus named St. Vincent's, representing both indoor and outdoor locations.

== Soundtrack ==
The Bhootnii (Original Motion Picture Soundtrack)
| No. | Title | Singer(s) | Length |
|---|---|---|---|
| 1. | "Mahakaal Mahakaali" | Hansraj Raghuwanshi, Shabbir Ahmed, BigLuv, Ajay Pal Sharma | 5:11 |
| 2. | "Tararara" | Mika Singh, Iconyk, Upsidedown, Sidhaant Sachdev | 2:43 |
| 3. | "Aaye Re Baba" | Mika Singh, Akshay The One, Iconyk, Upsidedown | 2:45 |
| 4. | "Rang Laga" | Mukund Suryawanshi, Vaishnavi Thakur, Akshay The One | 3:05 |
| 5. | "Nakhre" | Shashi, Deepali Sathe, Iconyk, Upsidedown, Siddharth Gauba, Aditya Ojha |
| 6. | "Rang Laga (Ethereal)" | Sunidhi Chauhan, Mukund Suryawanshi, Vaishnavi Thakur, Akshay The One |
| 7. | "Nakhre (Reprise)" | Raashi Sood, Iconyk, Upsidedown, Raunaq Singh, Siddharth Gauba |
| 8. | "Bhootnii (Theme)" | Amar Mohile |
| 9. | "The Bhootnii Swag" |

== Release ==
=== Theatrical ===
The film was originally slated for a theatrical release on 18 April 2025 but was postponed to 1 May 2025 due to delay in post-production and VFX work.

=== Home media ===
The film began streaming on ZEE5 from 18 July 2025.

== Reception ==
The Bhootnii received mixed to negative reviews from critics.

Ganesh Aaglave of Firstpost rated the film 3/5 stars and opined "On the whole, The Bhootnii works well because of its narrative and novelty." Dhaval Roy of The Times of India rated the film 2/5 stars and opined "Despite moments of humour, The Bhootnii struggles with inconsistent storytelling, underwhelming horror elements, and predictable twists."

Sna Farzeen of India Today rated the film 2/5 stars and wrote "Sanjay Dutt and Sunny Singh deliver a lackluster performance in a horror-comedy that fails to amuse or engage audiences. Despite its attempt at blending romance and supernatural elements, the film ends up as an uninspired two-hour ordeal."

Shubhra Gupta of The Indian Express rated the film 0/5 stars and summarized "Sanjay Dutt-Mouni Roy 'film' proudly and flagrantly stands apart from any vestiges of plot and production values, forget about sense and sensibility."
