= Girdhar Swami =

Indian casting director

- Born: India
- Occupation: Casting director
- Years active: 2009–present

Girdhar Swami is an Indian casting director. He made his debut with the film 3 Idiots. He is primarily recognized for his work on projects such as the National Award-winning film 3 Idiots, Rowdy Rathore,Wazir, Sanam Teri Kasam, Babumoshai Bandookbaaz, Andhadhun, Coolie No. 1 and Yaariyan 2.

== Biography ==
In 2009, Girdhar Swami commenced his career as a casting director with the film 3 Idiots starring Aamir Khan. In 2012, he worked on the casting for Rowdy Rathore featuring Akshay Kumar and Ferrari Ki Sawaari starring Sharman Joshi. The following year, he cast for Chashme Baddoor starring Ali Zafar and Taapsee Pannu.

In 2014, Swami was involved in casting for Hasee Toh Phasee featuring Sidharth Malhotra and Parineeti Chopra, and Gunday starring Ranveer Singh and Arjun Kapoor. He also worked on Calendar Girls in 2015.

In 2016, he cast for Sanam Teri Kasam starring Harshvardhan Rane and Mawra Hocane and Wazir featuring Farhan Akhtar and Amitabh Bachchan. In 2017, his casting projects included Gul Makai starring Divya Dutta and Atul Kulkarni, Indu Sarkar featuring Neil Nitin Mukesh, Beyond the Clouds starring Ishaan Khatter and Malavika Mohanan, and Babumoshai Bandookbaaz featuring Nawazuddin Siddiqui.

In 2018, Swami worked on Andhadhun, a National Award-winning film starring Ayushmann Khurrana, Tabu, and Radhika Apte, as well as Bhaiaji Superhit featuring Sunny Deol and Preity Zinta. In 2020, he cast for Coolie No. 1 starring Varun Dhawan and Sara Ali Khan, and Virgin Bhanupriya featuring Urvashi Rautela. In 2023, he worked on casting for Yaariyan 2 starring Meezaan Jafri and Divya Khosla Kumar.

== Filmography ==
Year	Project	Director	Notes
2009	3 Idiots	Rajkumar Hirani	Debut project
2012	Rowdy Rathore	Prabhu Deva	
2012	Ferrari Ki Sawaari	Rajesh Mapuskar	
2012	Chashme Baddoor	David Dhawan	
2014	Hasee Toh Phasee	Vinil Mathew	
2014	Gunday	Ali Abbas Zafar	
2015	Calendar Girls	Madhur Bhandarkar	
2016	Sanam Teri Kasam	Radhika Rao-Vinay Sapru	
2016	Wazir	Bejoy Nambiar	
2017	Gul Makai	H.E. Amjad Khan	
2017	Indu Sarkar	Madhur Bhandarkar	
2017	Beyond the Clouds	Majid Majidi	
2017	Babumoshai Bandookbaaz	Kushan Nandy	
2018	Andhadhun	Sriram Raghavan	National Award-winning film
2018	Bhaiaji Superhit	Neerraj Pathak	
2020	Coolie No. 1	David Dhawan	
2020	Virgin Bhanupriya	Ajay Lohan	
2023	Yaariyan 2	Radhika Rao and Vinay Sapru	
