= Sanam Teri Kasam (2016 film) =

2016 Indian film by Vinay Sapru & Radhika Rao

- Theatrical release poster
- Directed by: Radhika Rao; Vinay Sapru
- Written by: Radhika Rao; Vinay Sapru
- Produced by: Deepak Mukut; Bhaumik Gondaliya
- Starring: Harshvardhan Rane Mawra Hocane
- Cinematography: Chirantan Das
- Music by: Himesh Reshammiya
- Production companies: Jhoom Jhoom Productions; Soham Rockstar Productions
- Distributed by: Eros International
- Release date: 5 February 2016
- Running time: 153 minutes
- Country: India
- Language: Hindi
- Budget: ₹14−25 crore (Note: Sanam Teri Kasam's reported budgets vary between ₹14 crore (Hindustan Times and News18) - ₹18 crore (Business Standard) - ₹19 crore (Pinkvilla) – ₹2 crore (The Hindu and ThePrint))
- Box office: ₹16.03 crore (initial run) ₹41 crore (re-release)

Sanam Teri Kasam (transl. Swear on you, my beloved) is a 2016 Indian Hindi-language romantic drama film written and directed by Radhika Rao and Vinay Sapru. Produced by Deepak Mukut, the film stars Harshvardhan Rane and Mawra Hocane in their Hindi film debuts, with Anurag Sinha, Manish Chaudhari, Murli Sharma and Sudesh Berry.

The film is a modern rendition of the legends of Shiva-Sati and novel Love Story by Eric Segal. It tells the story of a tough ex-convict, Inder, and a librarian, Saru. They fall in love and get married but a tragedy changes their lives forever.

The cinematography was done by Chirantan Das, the music was by Himesh Reshammiya, and the lyrics were written by Reshammiya, Sameer Anjaan, Shabbir Ahmed and Subrat Sinha.

Sanam Teri Kasam was released worldwide on 5 February 2016 under Eros International. It received mixed reviews from critics and was a commercial failure in its first release but over the time it's became a cult film . It was re-released on 7 February 2025 and emerged as the second highest-grossing re-released Indian film.

== Plot ==
A large crowd congratulates successful lawyer Inder Lal Parihaar after winning a case. He returns home, grabs a bottle of wine, and walks to a tree as a flashback begins.

Saraswati "Saru" Parthasaarthy, a librarian, is rejected by suitors who find her old-fashioned. Her sister Kaveri's wedding is postponed until Saru marries. When Kaveri threatens to elope, Saru promises to find a husband soon. Inder Lal Parihaar, an ex-convict known for his tough attitude, moves into the same building. The original owner, Lily, has already transferred ownership to Inder. Inder immediately falls for Saru. He breaks up with his girlfriend, Ruby Malhotra. Saru and Inder meet in the elevator by accident and later at the library where Saru works. At the library, Inder tries to pass written messages to Saru multiple times by borrowing books from the library, but she overlooks them all the time.

Saru secretly meets Inder to get a makeover from Ruby, hoping to impress her colleague Abhimanyu. A drunk Ruby barges in, misunderstands the situation, and throws a wine bottle at Saru. Inder shields Saru and gets injured. As they leave for treatment, the security guard sees them and assumes they are intimate, alerting the neighbours. They run into trouble with a police officer who eventually lets them go. After returning, Saru tends to Inder's wounds. Later, Jayram (Saru's father) and neighbours find Saru in Inder's bed, misinterpreting the scene. Jayram, embarrassed, disowns Saru. Saru confides in her mother but asks her to keep it secret for Kaveri's marriage's sake.

Inder helps Saru find a new apartment and get a makeover, attracting Abhimanyu's attention. Inder remains silent when Abhimanyu proposes. On the wedding day, Abhimanyu rejects Saru due to family pressure, leaving her devastated. She spends the night with Inder. The next morning, Inder sees Saru with Abhimanyu through the window and, feeling depressed, breaks off contact with her. Later, after learning from Abhimanyu that Saru rejected him that morning, Inder tracks her down at a monastery and confesses his love. Saru faints; at the hospital, Inder learns she has terminal meningioma. He confronts her parents and is arrested. After being discharged, Saru discovers Inder's love through the messages he left at the library. They reunite, and Saru proposes marriage.

That night, Saru tells Inder that after her death, she wishes to be buried under a beautiful flowering tree. Inder meets Jayram and tells him that he is marrying Saru and would even kill or die for her. On their wedding day, Saru's parents arrive and give their blessing. Saru faints after the wedding and is hospitalised. Her parents learn about her illness, and Jayram angrily feels heartbroken and guilty. Inder asks his father, Rajinder Lal Parihaar, with whom he has had a strained relationship since his conviction, for a piece of land under the tree. However, instead of granting his request, Rajinder responds with hurtful words, leading to a small argument between them. While in the hospital with Saru, Inder confesses that his nanny, Lily, who had raised him as her son, killed his enraged uncle Inder when the uncle tried to force himself upon her. Inder took the blame for the crime. Saru helps Inder value his relationship with his father. Later, Saru dies in Inder's arms, leaving him devastated. Inder finds Rajinder in the hospital and reconciles with him, thanks to the conversation he had with Saru.

The story returns to the present with Inder, now a successful lawyer, visiting Saru's grave (the tree) and expressing his eternal love to her.

== Cast ==
- Harshvardhan Rane as Inder Lal Parihaar
- Mawra Hocane as Saraswati "Saru" Parthasaarthy Parihaar
- Manish Chaudhari as Jayram Parthasaarthy
- Pyumori Mehta Ghosh as Arundhati Parthasaarthy
- Divyetta Singh as Kaveri Parthasaarthy
- Murali Sharma as Inspector Hari Nikam
- Sudesh Berry as Rajinder Lal Parihaar
- Anurag Sinha as Abhimanyu Shastry
- Shraddha Das as Ruby Malhotra
- Ripu Daman Singh as Sanjay
- Vijay Raaz as Mushtaqeen Bhai
- Rushad Rana as Doctor
- Siddhant Ghegadmal as Amit
- Alok Pandey as Watchman
- Ravii Sharma as Pandit
- Krishna Rathod
- Girdhar Swami Casting director

== Production ==
=== Development ===
In 2015, the director duo Radhika Rao and Vinay Sapru announced the film, that would be distributed by Eros International. The film was inspired from the classic legends of Shiva and his consort Sati. Sanam Teri Kasam is also inspired from Erich Segal's bestseller novel, Love Story. The film derive its name from a song of the 1982 Hindi film Sanam Teri Kasam.

=== Casting ===
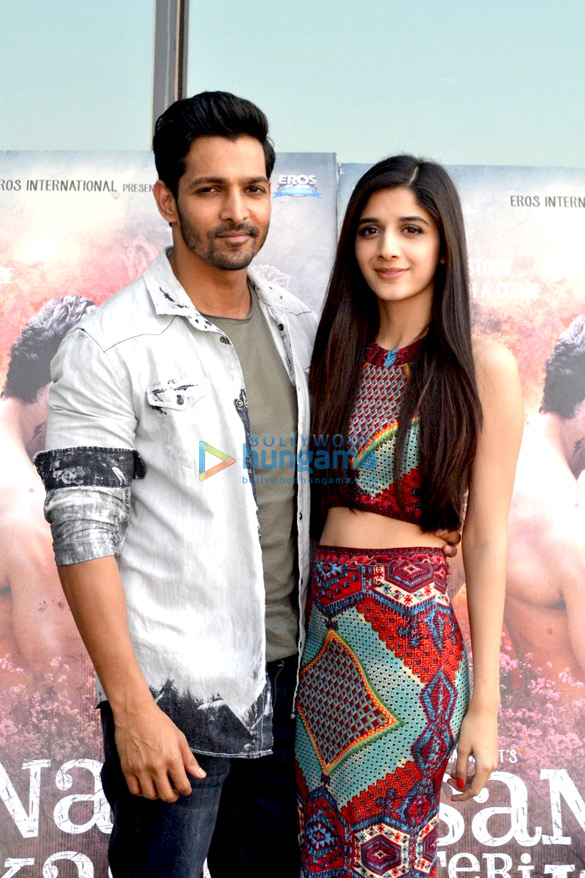
Sanam Teri Kasam marked Rane and Hocane's Hindi film debut

Harshvardhan Rane was cast to play Inder, an alcoholic lawyer. Rane termed the film and his role a "dream come true". Rane said that he modelled his character on Salman Khan and his father, and added, "I’ve modelled my character in Sanam Teri Kasam on my father who is stern on the outside but all heart inside. I couldn’t be any luckier than this."

Pakistani actress Mawra Hocane was cast to play Saraswati, a South Indian librarian. Hocane said that she is "extremely grateful" to be a part of the film. She added, "I did Sanam Teri Kasam because there was scope to perform. I played the nerdy, introvert who transforms into the quintessential Bollywood heroine." The film mark both the leads Bollywood debut.

Manish Chaudhari and Pyumori Mehta Ghosh were cast as Saru's parents and Divyetta Singh as Saru's sister. Sudesh Berry was cast as Inder's father. Murli Sharma was cast as Inspector, Anurag Sinha as Saru's ex-fiancé and Shraddha Das as Inder's ex-girlfriend.

=== Filming ===
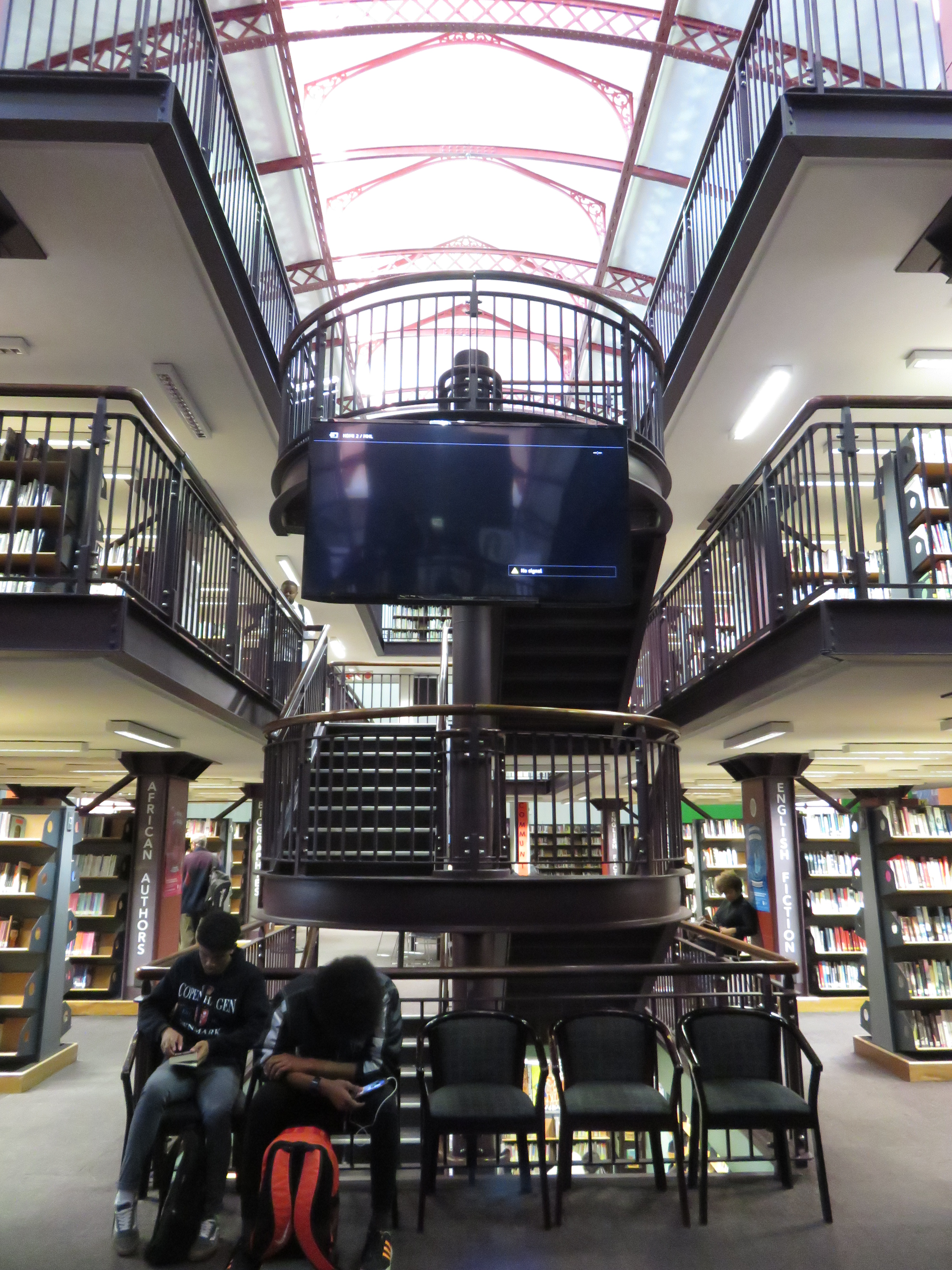
A major portion of the film was shot at the Central Library, Cape Town.

The principal photography commenced in 2015. The film was primarily shot in Delhi, Mumbai and Cape Town. The Parsi Colony in Dadar, Mumbai and the Central Library in Cape Town were among the main shooting locations of the film.

While shooting for the song "Tera Chehra", Hocane had to spend 21 hours in a bathtub.

During a sequence, Rane was injured and suffered bruises.

== Soundtrack ==
Sanam Teri Kasam's songs were composed by Himesh Reshammiya. The lyrics were penned by Sameer Anjaan, Shabbir Ahmed, Himesh Reshammiya and Subrat Sinha. The title track was released on 22 December 2015, and the complete album was released on 7 January 2016. The iconic guitar tune of the title track which was also the theme melody of the whole movie was created by Vivek Verma. The tune of song "Haal-E-Dil" was first finalised for Tere Naam, but eventually did not made it into the soundtrack. The soundtrack received positive reviews and praise from critics.

Sanam Teri Kasam

Soundtrack album by Himesh Reshammiya
- Released: 6 January 2016
- Recorded: 2016
- Venue: Mumbai
- Genre: Feature film soundtrack
- Length: 44:10
- Label: Sony Music
- Producer: Himesh Reshammiya

Himesh Reshammiya chronology
Prem Ratan Dhan Payo (2015)	Sanam Teri Kasam (2016)	Tera Suroor (2016)

=== Track listing ===
No.	Title	Lyrics	Singer(s)	Length
1.	"Sanam Teri Kasam"	Sameer	Ankit Tiwari, Palak Muchhal	5:14
2.	"Kheech Meri Photo"	Sameer	Darshan Raval, Neeti Mohan, Akasa Singh	4:44
3.	"Bewajah"	Sameer	Himesh Reshammiya	5:08
4.	"Tera Chehra"	Shabbir Ahmed	Arijit Singh	4:34
5.	"Haal-E-Dil" (Male)	Sameer	Sreerama Chandra	5:33
6.	"Haal-E-Dil" (Female)	Sameer	Neeti Mohan	5:24
7.	"Ek Number"	Himesh Reshammiya	Himesh Reshammiya	4:20
8.	"Teri Yaadon Main"	Subrat Sinha	Arijit Singh	4:16
9.	"Sanam Teri Kasam" (Reprise)	Sameer	Mohammed Irfan, Palak Muchhal	4:57
Total length:				44:10

== Release ==
Sanam Teri Kasam's first look of the film was unveiled on 7 December 2015 by Eros Now via a tweet and was scheduled for release on 8 January 2016. Trailer of the film was released on 15 December 2015 with a new release date of 5 February. The film was released worldwide on 5 February 2016 under the production banner of Eros Now. The film was also screened at Bollywood Film Festival in Moscow, in December 2016. Sanam Teri Kasam was later made available on Amazon Prime Video and Jio Cinema and Zee5. It was later re-released in theatres on 7 February 2025.

== Reception ==
=== Critical reception ===
The film received mixed to positive reviews from critics, with praise for the performances and music, but criticism for its screenplay.

Hindustan Times gave it 3 out of 5 stars and wrote, "With brilliant production values and performances, it manages to draw you into the lives of Saru and Inder and moistens your eyes too. The last fifteen minutes of the film, which drags a bit. Else, theirs is a love story that will touch your heart without a doubt." Bollywood Hungama gave it 2.5 out of 5 stars and said, "Sanam Teri Kasam is a decent assortment of good performances and superb music. However, the excessive length of the film will act as a biggest single drawback at the box-office."

Times of India gave it 2.5 out of 5 stars and wrote, "As long as the focus stays on its leads, the film does a good job, from Inder softening every time he is around Saraswati, to watching them goof around in Kheech Meri Photo, they are a treat from the word go." News18 gave it 2 out of 5 stars and said, "The cast and the music deserves a mention. The 155 minutes for a cliché love story amidst an ugly-duckling-turning-into-swan is just too much." Filmfare noted, "Sanam Teri Kasam proves that good talent can shine through bad films. Harshvardhan Rane and Mawra Hocane are definitely better than the tripe they act out. Sadly their efforts are wasted in this weepy romance that’s tedious and long drawn. But the saving grace of the film is its music, this film definitely had potential, but it needed better execution and a lot less yawns."

Film Companion and Pinkvilla placed Sanam Teri Kasam in their "Most Emotional Films" list.

=== Box-office ===
Sanam Teri Kasam grossed approximately ₹1.25 crore (US$130,000) on the first day of its release, ₹4.66 crore (US$500,000) in the opening weekend and ₹16.03 crore (US$1.7 million) in its original theatrical run.

During its re-release, the film made approximately ₹9 crore (equivalent to ₹9.3 crore or US$990,000 in 2026) in two days, surpassing the original run's domestic lifetime collections. Till date, the film has grossed 50 crore emerging as the highest-grossing re-released Indian film.

== Accolades ==
Award	Date of ceremony (Note: Date is linked to the article about the awards held that year, wherever possible.)	Category	Recipient(s)	Result	Ref.
Stardust Award	20 December 2016	Superstar of Tomorrow – Male	Harshvardhan Rane	Nominated	
RMIM Puraskaar	2016	Male Singer of the Year	Arijit Singh (For the song "Tera Chehra")	Won	

== Future ==
Harshvardhan Rane, the lead actor of the first film announced the film will have a sequel, with him returning to the cast along with Shraddha Kapoor. Director Vinay Sapru added, "We’re really happy that we could crack a story for this one. It moves ahead - it talks about what happens to Harshvardhan's character after Mawra Hocane’s character dies in the first outing." In February 2024, Rane revealed that the plans of the sequel has been dropped due to "box office failure" of the first movie.

== See also ==
- List of Hindi films of 2016
