= Cafe Good Luck =

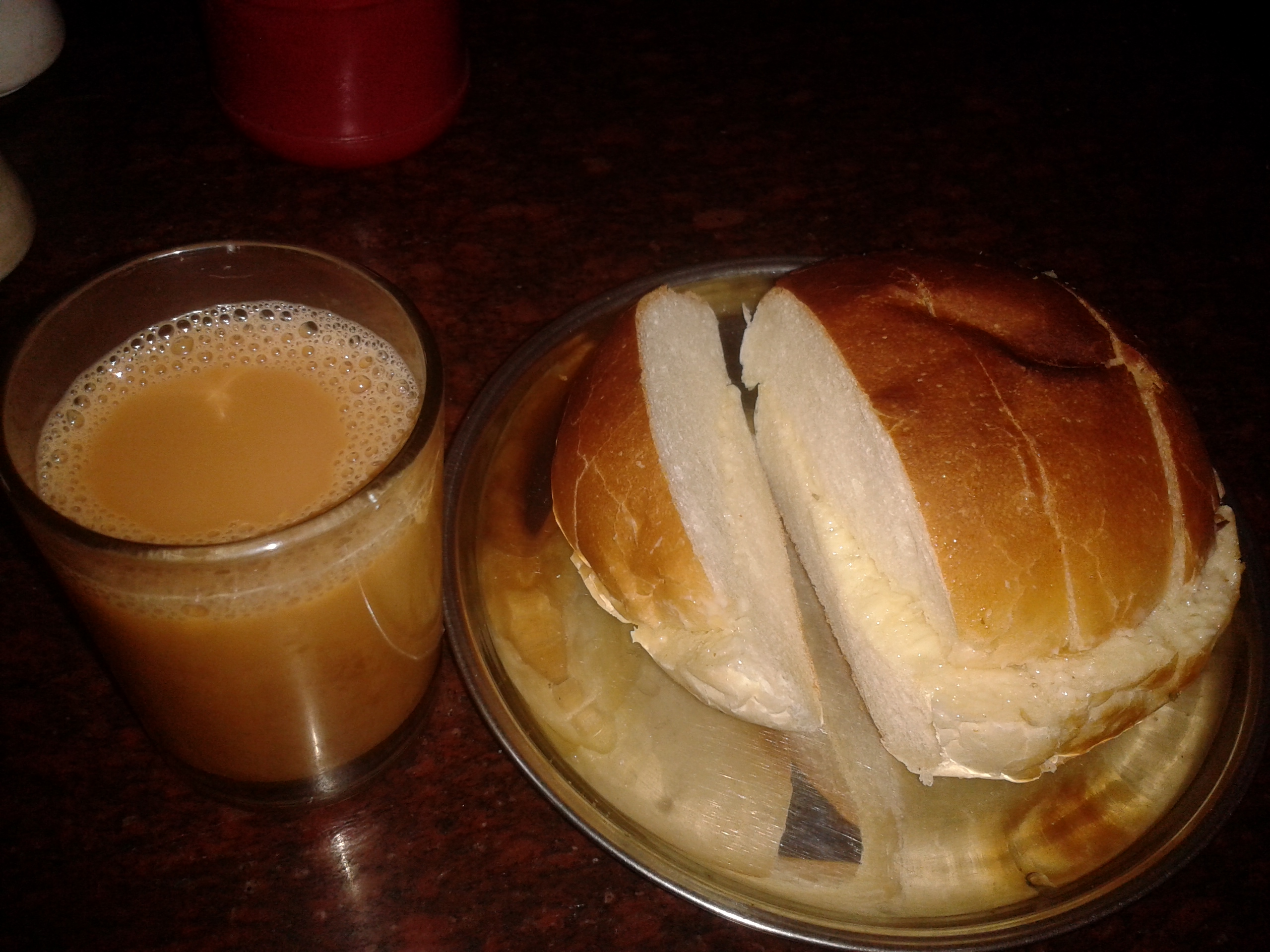
- Bun Maska Pav
- Interactive map of Cafe Good Luck

Restaurant information
- Established: 1935
- Food type: multi-cuisine
- Location: F. C. Road, Pune, Maharashtra, India
- Other information: Open 7 AM to 11:30 PM

Cafe GoodLuck is a popular Irani cafe-restaurant located on the Fergusson College Road in the Deccan Gymkhana area of Pune, India. Established in 1935 by Hussain Ali Yakshi, it is one of the oldest Irani establishments in Pune and was perhaps the first garden restaurant in Pune. Cafe GoodLuck is well-known for its bun maska/bun omelette and Iranian tea. The cafe has a few branches across the city, including a franchise - Chhota Bite by Cafe Goodluck
