= Kakuda (film) =

2024 Indian film by Aditya Sarpotdar

- Official release poster
- Directed by: Aditya Sarpotdar
- Written by: Avinash Dwivedi; Chirag Garg
- Produced by: Ronnie Screwvala
- Starring: Riteish Deshmukh; Sonakshi Sinha; Saqib Saleem
- Cinematography: Lawrence D'Cunha
- Edited by: Faisal Mahadik
- Music by: Gulraj Singh
- Production company: RSVP Movies
- Distributed by: ZEE5
- Release date: 12 July 2024
- Running time: 116 minutes
- Country: India
- Language: Hindi

Kakuda is a 2024 Hindi-language horror comedy film directed by Aditya Sarpotdar and produced by Ronnie Screwvala, under RSVP Movies. It stars Riteish Deshmukh, Sonakshi Sinha, Saqib Saleem and Aasif Khan in the lead roles. It is written by Avinash Dwivedi and Chirag Garg. It was released on ZEE5 on 12 July 2024.

== Plot ==
The story is set in Ratodi, a village cursed by the ghost Kakuda, who appears every Tuesday at 7:15 pm. Each house has a small door that must be opened at that time; if not, Kakuda enters, kicks the male resident responsible, causing a fatal hump to appear, and the victim dies after 13 days.

Sunny, a local, marries Indira despite her father’s objections. On their wedding night, Sunny forgets to open the small door and is cursed by Kakuda. Indira, skeptical of the supernatural, seeks medical help, but the curse persists. She then consults Victor, a ghost hunter, who investigates Kakuda’s origins.

Through their investigation, they learn Kakuda was once a kind circus dwarf who healed villagers with his right kick but was falsely accused of an affair and killed by the villagers. Seeking revenge, his spirit now haunts the village.

Victor, Indira, Sunny, and others devise a plan to defeat Kakuda by targeting his supernatural right leg. After a confrontation involving possession and deception, Victor manages to sever Kakuda’s leg, breaking the curse. Sunny recovers, and the villagers are freed. The story ends with a hint that the supernatural threat may not be entirely gone.

== Cast ==
- Riteish Deshmukh as Victor Jacobs, a ghost hunter
- Sonakshi Sinha in dual roles as
  - Indira "Indu": Sunny's wife
  - Gomati: Indira's twin sister
- Saqib Saleem as Sunny
- Aasif Khan as Kilvish
- Hemant Singh as BulBulaa
- Mahesh Jadhav as Kakuda
- Rajendra Gupta as Indira's father
- Neelu Kohli as Indira's mother
- Taniya Kalrra as Gilloti
- Yogendra Tikku as Kishanchand, Sunny's father
- Alok Gutch as Bespectacled old villager
- Sameer Khakkar as Kalamandi Goyal

== Production ==
The film was announced by the producer Ronnie Screwvala on 20 July 2021.

=== Filming ===
Principal photography of the movie started on 20 July 2021. The film was shot in places across Gujarat including the village called Vaso (Kheda District) and near the port area of Mandvi, Kutch. The unit wrapped up on 17 September 2021.

== Release ==
Initially scheduled for a theatrical release, it was changed to a streaming release on ZEE5 on 12 July 2024.

== Music ==
Kakuda

Soundtrack album by Gulraj Singh
- Released: 05 July 2024
- Genre: Feature film soundtrack
- Length: 6:56
- Language: Hindi
- Label: Zee Music Company

The soundtrack is composed by Gulraj Singh and lyrics is written by Manoj Yadav.

Track listing
No.	Title	Singer(s)	Length
1.	"Bhasma"	Divya Kumar, Gulraj Singh	3:04
2.	"Shukra Guzaar"	Aditi Paul, Gulraj Singh	3:52
Total length:			06:56

== Reception ==
On the review aggregator website Rotten Tomatoes, 20% of 5 critics' reviews are positive, with an average rating of 4/10.

Shubhra Gupta of The Indian Express commented "‘Kakuda’ jumps into a predictable hump, and stays there." Reviewing for Rediff.com Deepa Gahlot gave the film 2 stars only and stated "Kakuda has a paint-by-numbers, catch-the-trend-before-it-fades feel to it." Monika Rawal Kukreja of Hindustan Times gave a negative verdict "The film suffers from an extremely dull screenplay where events unfold in the most bizarre manner, not laving any impact." Sana Farzeen of India Today observed "The story is quite a winner, but their screenplay could have been tighter."

Devesh Sharma of Filmfare also gave a negative review "The film's feeble attempts at humour fall flat, failing to provoke even a chuckle."

Shreyanka Mazumdar of News18 gave 3.5/5 stars and commented "Despite the flaws, the film is an enjoyable film that effectively uses folklore to create a sense of pervasive dread." Nandini Ramnath of Scroll.in explored "The movie has very mild scares, ample tomfoolery, and no ambition of being anything beyond a time-passer."
