= Deepak Mukut =

Indian film producer and distributor

- Born: 18 October 1971 (age 54); Jaipur, Rajasthan
- Occupations: Producer; distributor
- Spouse: Krishna Mukut
- Parent: Kamal Kishore Mukut

Deepak Mukut is an Indian film producer and distributor who works in Hindi cinema. He is the founder of Soham Rockstar Entertainment and Jhoom Jhoom Media, Deepak is known for producing films that include Dhaakad, Forensic, Thank God, Sanam Teri Kasam, and Mulk that brought him various awards.

== Career ==
Deepa Mukut is the son of the film producer Kamal Mukut. Deepak started his career in jewelry making and moved to Hong Kong.

He established Soham Rockstar Entertainment in 2016. He has made more than 15 serials and film-based programs on channels like Star TV, Sony, Colors, B4U, and Disney.

In 2016, he produced his first film Sanam Teri Kasam, starring Harshvardhan Rane and Mawra Hocane.

== Filmography ==
Year	Film	Producer	Notes
2025	Matka	✓	
2025	Apne 2	✓	Starring Dharmendra, Sunny Deol, and Bobby Deol
2025	Faraar	✓	Starring Nawazuddin Siddiqui
2025	The Bhootnii	✓	Starring Sanjay Dutt, Sunny Singh, Mouni Roy, Palak Tiwari
2025	Sirf Ek Friday	✓	Starring Avitesh Shrivastava, Mahesh Manjrekar, Rajesh Sharma (actor), Farida Jalal
2025	Blind Game	✓	Starring Arjun Rampal, Priyamani
2023	Kanjoos Makhichoos	✓	Starring Kunal Khemu, Shweta Tripathi, Piyush Mishra
2022	Bal Naren	✓	Inspired by Prime Minister Narendra Modi's Swachh Bharat Mission Campaign
2022	Thank God	✓	Starring Ajay Devgn, Sidharth Malhotra, Rakul Preet Singh
2022	Forensic	✓	Starring Vikrant Massey, Radhika Apte, Prachi Desai
2022	Dhaakad	✓	Starring Kangana Ranaut, Arjun Rampal
2020	Taish	✓	
2020	Makeup	✓	
2019	Mad	✓	
2019	Jhoota Kahin Ka	✓	
2018	Genius	✓	Starring Nawazuddin Siddiqui, Mithun Chakraborty, Utkarsh Sharma
2018	Mulk	✓	Award for Best Feature Film and Star Screen Award for Best Film (Critics) for the movie
2017	Shaadi Mein Zaroor Aana		Presenter & Distributor
2016	Sanam Teri Kasam	✓	Award for Best Actor in a negative role of the movie
2012	Murder	✓	

== Awards and nominations ==
Year	Award	Category	Work	Result
2018	Florence River to River Indian Film Festival	Best Feature Film	Mulk	Won
2018	Star Screen Award	Best Film (Critics)	Mulk	Won
2018	Filmfare Awards	Best Story	Mulk	Won
2018	Zee Cine Awards	Best Actress (Viewers Choice)	Mulk	Nominated
2018	Mid-Day Award	Iconic Producer and Distributor	Mulk	Won
2019	Uttar Pradesh Film Festival & Seminar	Awarded by Uttar Pradesh Chief Minister Yogi Adityanath	Mulk	Won
