= Rehnaa Hai Terre Dil Mein =

2001 film by Gautham Menon

- Theatrical Release Poster
- Directed by: Gautham Vasudev Menon
- Written by: Gautham Vasudev Menon; Vipul D. Shah
- Based on: Minnale by Gautham Vasudev Menon
- Produced by: Vashu Bhagnani
- Starring: R. Madhavan; Saif Ali Khan; Dia Mirza; Anupam Kher
- Cinematography: Johny Lal
- Edited by: Sanjay Verma
- Music by: Harris Jayaraj
- Production company: Pooja Entertainment
- Distributed by: Eros Entertainment
- Release date: 19 October 2001
- Running time: 169 minutes
- Country: India
- Language: Hindi
- Budget: ₹6 crore

Rehnaa Hai Terre Dil Mein (transl. Have to Reside In Your Heart), also known by the initialism RHTDM, is a 2001 Indian Hindi-language romantic drama film written and directed by Gautham Vasudev Menon, starring R. Madhavan, Saif Ali Khan and Dia Mirza in the lead roles. The film is a remake of the director's own Tamil film Minnale (released in the same year), which also starred Madhavan in his reprised role. This is Dia Mirza's debut film as well as Tamil actor, Madhavan's official Bollywood debut film after having an uncredited appearance in the song "Chup Tum Raho" in Is Raat Ki Subah Nahin.

The film revolves around the love story of Madhav "Maddy" Shastri (Madhavan) and Reena Malhotra (Mirza). The latter is set to get engaged to Rajeev "Sam" Samra (Khan), who is a young man settled in the US and Maddy's former college rival. The film though did not perform well at box office during its release, achieved popularity through reruns on TV and achieved a cult status.

The film was re-released on 30 August 2024, earning over ₹3.50 crore and ranking as the 16th highest-grossing re-released Indian film in history.

== Plot ==
The story begins with narration by Madhav "Maddy" Shastri, the carefree son of music shop owner Deendayal Shastri. His father dreams that one day Maddy will inherit the family business, but Maddy has no interest. He is reckless, unserious about studies, and notorious at his college. His opposite is Rajeev "Sam" Samra, a disciplined, model student admired by teachers and classmates alike. The two are bitter rivals, constantly clashing. Their animosity grows so intense that Maddy even attempts to frame Sam. When Sam challenges him to a fight, Maddy accepts eagerly, but the professors intervene before it begins. At Sam’s graduation party, Maddy tries again to provoke him, but Sam refuses, leaving college with the warning that one day he will settle the score.

Three years later, Maddy has matured somewhat and is now a software instructor at a private company. However, his carefree attitude remains. During a trip to Delhi, he encounters a young woman dancing in the rain with children. Captivated, he calls her “my kind of girl” without knowing her name. Shortly after, fate brings him face to face with her again at a wedding. He discovers that her name is Reena Malhotra. Determined to win her heart, he tries to learn more about her, but opportunities slip away until they cross paths once more in Mumbai.

Maddy is delighted, until he learns that Reena is about to be engaged to Rajeev, a childhood friend who has been living in the United States. Crucially, Reena has not seen Rajeev in years and does not know what he looks like now. Persuaded by his friends and father, Maddy impulsively decides to impersonate Rajeev until the real one arrives. Over five magical days, he shows his affection and sincerity. What begins as friendship blossoms into love, and Reena eventually admits her feelings for him. Maddy plans to confess the truth in that moment, but his chance is cut short when the real Rajeev arrives. Reena, feeling betrayed, cancels her relationship with Maddy despite his desperate attempts to explain himself.

To Maddy’s horror, Rajeev is none other than Sam, his old rival. Sam is furious to discover that his impostor is the same Maddy he despises. Believing the entire affair to be rooted in their past enmity, he refuses to trust Maddy’s intentions. Maddy tries to come clean to Reena with the truth, but she is still not interested in him. As her wedding to Rajeev approaches, Maddy and his friends decide to beat up Rajiv in a parking lot, but Maddy quickly gives up and lets Rajeev go back to Reena, realizing his mistakes and decides to move on from her.

Eventually, Reena begins to recognize that, despite his dishonesty, she has truly started falling in love with Maddy, which Sam doesn't realize until the wedding. At the same time, Maddy accepts a job transfer to San Francisco, which he had initially opted against, to erase his memories of Reena. When Rajeev sees Reena’s true feelings, he takes her to the airport. There, she and Maddy confess their love, reuniting at last. Rajeev, though heartbroken, masks his pain with pride, telling Maddy, “we can never be friends,” before walking away. Reena and Maddy embrace a future together, their love finally overcoming rivalry and dishonesty.

== Cast ==
- R. Madhavan as Madhav "Maddy" Shastri, Sam’s rival / Rajiv (fake), Reena's lover.
- Saif Ali Khan as Rajeev "Sam" Samra, Reena's fiancé and Maddy’s rival.
- Dia Mirza as Reena Malhotra, Rajeev's fiancé and Maddy's lover.
- Vrajesh Hirjee as Vikram "Vicky", Maddy's friend.
- Tannaz Irani as Shruti, Reena's best friend and Vicky's crush.
- Anupam Kher as Deendayal "DD" Shastri, Maddy's father.
- Navin Nischol as Mahesh Malhotra, Reena's father.
- Smita Jaykar as Mrs. Malhotra, Reena's mother.
- Hemant Pandey as the lorry driver whose lorry collides with Madhav's motorcycle carrying Vicky.
- Kabir Sadanand as Madhav's friend
- Gautham Vasudev Menon as Madhav's software company's boss. (cameo appearance)
- Jackky Bhagnani as the bouquet deliveryman to Reena. (cameo appearance)
- Sarita Birje (Madhavan's real-life wife) as a student in Madhav's tutorial class. (cameo appearance)

== Production ==
The success of the Tamil film Minnale led to producer Vashu Bhagnani signing Gautham Vasudev Menon on to direct the Hindi language remake of the film with Rajshri Productions, Rehna Hai Tere Dil Mein, which also featured Madhavan. An early title for the film was Koi Mil Gaya, before the team finalised Rehnaa Hai Terre Dil Mein. The former title was used by Rakesh Roshan for his 2003 film. Though Richa Pallod was initially considered for the leading female role, Dia Mirza and Saif Ali Khan were added to the film. Menon was initially apprehensive but said it took "half an hour" to agree and against his intentions, the producer opted against retaining the technical crew of the original. He changed a few elements, deleted certain scenes and added some more for the version. The team shot for the film in South Africa and shot scenes at Durban Beach and in Drakensberg, with production executive Raakesh Maharaj arranging the unit's stay in the country.

== Soundtrack ==
Rehnaa Hai Terre Dil Mein

Soundtrack album by Harris Jayaraj
- Released: August 2001
- Recorded: 2001
- Genre: Feature film soundtrack
- Length: 53:58
- Label: Saregama
- Producer: Harris Jayaraj

Harris Jayaraj chronology
Minnale (2001)	Rehnaa Hai Terre Dil Mein (2001)	Majunu (2001)
External audio
- Official Audio Jukebox on YouTube

Rehnaa Hai Terre Dil Mein Additional songs (Not included in the film)

Soundtrack album by Vishal-Shekhar Anand Raj Anand Aadesh Shrivastava A. M.

The score and songs were composed by Harris Jayaraj, with lyrics written by Sameer. The last three tracks were bonus tracks and did not feature in the film. The tune of the track "Dil Ko Tumse" was later reused by Harris in Tamil film Kaakha Kaakha (2003) as "Ondra Renda".

All tracks are written by Sameer.

Tracklist
No.	Title	Music	Singer(s)	Length
1.	"Rehnaa Hai Tere Dil Mein"	Harris Jayaraj	Sonu Nigam, Kavita Krishnamurthy	5:07
2.	"Oh Mama Mama"	Harris Jayaraj	Sonu Nigam	4:35
3.	"Kaise Main Kahoon Tujhse"	Harris Jayaraj	Sonu Nigam	1:04
4.	"Zara Zara"	Harris Jayaraj	Jayashri Ramnath	4:58
5.	"Bolo Bolo"	Harris Jayaraj	Shaan, Chorus	5:55
6.	"Dil Ko Tumse"	Harris Jayaraj	Roop Kumar Rathod	5:31
7.	"Sach Keh Raha Hai"	Harris Jayaraj	KK	5:28
8.	"Churaya Churaya (Aya re Aya koi Aya re)"	Vishal–Shekhar	Babul Supriyo, Preeti & Pinky	3:50
9.	"Na Sone Ke Bangle Mein" (Not featured in the Film)	A.M.M	KK, Anuradha Sriram	6:28
10.	"Tujhe Dekha Jabse Jaana Deewana" (Not featured in the Film)	Anand Raj Anand	Shaan, Sunidhi Chauhan	5:23
11.	"Sohni Sohni" (Not featured in the Film)	Aadesh Shrivastava	Sukhwinder Singh, Vasundhara Das	5:39
12.	"Zara Zara - Club Mix" (Not featured in the Film)	Harris Jayaraj	DJ Sahil AiM, Jayashri	3:07
Total length:				57:05

== Release and reception ==
In comparison to Minnale (2001), the film gained mixed reviews. Taran Adarsh called the presentation "not absorbing" though stating that the director " handled certain sequences with aplomb". A critic from The Hindu wrote it "is not a bad bargain at the end of a long day" and "there are parts where you would actually enjoy the courting game between a game hero and a gorgeous heroine" with "fine one-liners and good gestures", before adding "a part does not a whole make". Ranjita Das of Rediff.com wrote ″Rehnaa Hai Terre Dil Mein may not have any star attraction. But it is definitely entertaining and enjoyable.″

The moderate performance of the film left the director disappointed, with Menon claiming in hindsight that the film lacked the simplicity of the original with the producer's intervention affecting proceedings.

In 2011, the producer of the film approached him to remake the film with the producer's son Jackky Bhagnani in the lead role, but Menon was uninterested with the offer. On the fifteenth anniversary of the film's release, actors Madhavan and Dia Mirza met up and released a video thanking the film's admirers for their adulation.

== Re-release ==
Rehnaa Hai Terre Dil Mein was re-released in theatres on 30 August 2024. It received a strong response in Pune city, where it earned the highest revenue. In just 10 days, the film made ₹3.2 crore, with ₹75 lakh coming from Pune alone. The film earned ₹1 crore in the second weekend, bringing its total re-release earnings to ₹3.25 crore. The film finished its theatrical re-run with a gross of over ₹3.50 crore.
