= Sachein =

- Theatrical release poster
- Directed by: John Mahendran
- Written by: John Mahendran
- Produced by: Kalaipuli S. Thanu
- Starring: Vijay; Genelia; Bipasha Basu
- Cinematography: Jeeva
- Edited by: V. T. Vijayan
- Music by: Devi Sri Prasad
- Production company: V Creations
- Distributed by: V Creations; Ayngaran International
- Release date: 14 April 2005
- Running time: 151 minutes
- Country: India
- Language: Tamil
- Box office: ₹10 crore (initial run) ₹6 crore (re-release)

Sachein is a 2005 Indian Tamil-language romantic comedy film directed by John Mahendran and produced by Kalaipuli S. Thanu. The film stars Vijay in the titular role, alongside Genelia, Bipasha Basu (in her Tamil debut), Vadivelu, Santhanam and Raghuvaran. It is an adaptation of the director's 2002 Telugu film Neetho with minor changes. The score and soundtrack were composed by Devi Sri Prasad with cinematography by Jeeva and editing by V. T. Vijayan. The film released on 14 April 2005.

== Plot ==
Sachein, a carefree and happy-going guy, joins a college in Ooty and falls for Shalini immediately on seeing her at first sight. Shalini studies in the same college as Sachein and is considered a popular and beautiful student, while also being a short-tempered and arrogant girl with an upper-middle-class status. Sachein learns this information about her from Arnold aka Ayyasamy, a man who has studied at the college for about nine years and keeps doing so because he thinks that students should give respect to their college professors, while also informing Sachein that many boys are trying to impress her. This makes Sachein take a different route, and he starts mocking Shalini in front of her, which irritates her. Slowly, they both become good friends after Sachein saves her father in a bike accident.

Santhanam, another student in the college, also loves Shalini, but he feels jealous upon seeing her and Sachein being good friends and decides to separate them. Santhanam writes on one of the walls of the college that Sachein loves Shalini, and this angers Shalini as she misunderstands that Sachein has done it. Shalini shouts at Sachein, who informs her that he is so outspoken and does not want to write on the college wall to convey his love, which makes Shalini realize her mistake. To her surprise, Sachein informs her that, although he had not written it, the content on the wall is true, which means that he is in love with Shalini. This again angers Shalini, and she shouts at him that she considered him only as a good friend and that she was not in love with him. Later, Shalini overhears Sachein challenging Santhanam that Shalini will convey her love within the next 30 days, as their college years will be completed by then. Shalini challenges Sachein that she will never fall in love with him.

Manju is also from the same college, and she likes Sachein. Shalini gets jealous when she spots Sachein and Manju together often, but Manju informs Shalini that Sachein loves Shalini so much and asks her not to hide her feelings, as it is very evident that Shalini also likes Sachein. This makes Shalini realize her love for Sachein. Sachein learns that Shalini's parents have arranged a wedding for her. He meets Shalini on the last day of their college and says that he has lost the challenge and will be leaving Ooty tomorrow. However, Shalini hides her feelings towards Sachein and plans to propose her love the next day as she wants to win the challenge by not conveying her love within the 30 days.

On the 31st day, Shalini is excited and goes to propose to Sachein, but suddenly, she meets his father Gowtham on the way. Gowtham is a billionaire, which makes the entire college surprised that Sachein is the only son of a rich business tycoon, as Sachein always stays very simple and down-to-earth. Now Shalini feels bad because if she proposes her love towards Sachein at this moment, then he might misunderstand that she decided to marry him after knowing that he is rich, so she decides to stay calm. Sachein leaves to Coimbatore International Airport, and Shalini also follows him. In the airport, Shalini cannot control her emotions and proposes to Sachein. She also revealed that it was her ego that did not let her convey her love during the last 30 days. Sachein feels happy, and the couple is united.

== Cast ==
- Vijay as Sachein
- Genelia as Shalini (voice over by Kaniha)
- Bipasha Basu as Manju
- Vadivelu as Ayyasamy (Arnold)
- Santhanam as Santhanam
- Raghuvaran as Gowtham, Sachein's father
- Thalaivasal Vijay as Preethi's father
- Thadi Balaji as Balaji
- Chaams as Ayyasamy's friend (credited as Swaminathan)
- Mohan Sharma as Shalini's father
- Baby Sharmi as Preethi
- Mayilsamy as Fake Blind Man
- Rashmi Murali as Smrithi, Shalini's friend
- Chitra Rangavasan as Shalini's mother
- Linda Arsenio as Peter Akka (item number in song "Vaadi Vaadi") (Note: Peter in Chennai slang refers to a foreigner who speaks English.)

== Music ==
Sachein

Soundtrack album by Devi Sri Prasad
- Released: 7 March 2005
- Recorded: 2005
- Genre: Feature film soundtrack
- Length: 27:41
- Labels: Ayngaran Music; Anak Audio; AP International; Kalaippuli Audio
- Producer: Devi Sri Prasad

Devi Sri Prasad chronology
Bunny (2005)	Sachein (2005)	Bhadra (2005)

The music was composed by Devi Sri Prasad, with lyrics written by Pa. Vijay, Kabilan, Na. Muthukumar, V. Elango, and Palani Bharathi. Vijay sang a kuthu-number "Vaadi Vaadi" for this film, a song that was recorded in the wardrobe of his house, which the music director has set up as a studio. This was his last song as a playback singer, before rendering "Google Google" from Thuppakki (2012), after a seven-year sabbatical. The album was released on 7 March 2005. The songs "Vaadi Vaadi", "Dai Dai Dai Kattikkoda", "Kanmoodi Thirakumbothu" and "Gundu Manga Thoppukkulle" songs became chartbusters upon its release. The song "Gundu Manga Thoppukulle" is based on "Vangathota" from Abhi (2004). Additionally the song "Vaseegara" composed by Harris Jayaraj for the 2001 film Minnale was re-used.

Track listing
No.	Title	Lyrics	Singer(s)	Length
1.	"Va Va Va En Thalaiva"	Pa. Vijay (Note: The lyrics "Maro Maro Goli Maro, Yaro Yaro Sun Yaro" was originally written by Chandrabose for the song "Maro Maro" from Bunny (2005).)	Shankar Mahadevan (Note: The song reuses the introductory "Ow!" sound from Michael Jackson's "Smooth Criminal".)	4:53
2.	"Kanmoodi Thirakumbothu"	Na. Muthukumar	Devi Sri Prasad	5:42
3.	"Vaadi Vaadi"	V. Elango	Vijay, Vadivelu	5:20
4.	"Gundu Manga Thoppukulle"	Kabilan	Jassie Gift, Malathy Lakshman	5:05
5.	"Beat Of Sachien"		Instrumental	2:12
6.	"Dai Dai Dai Kattikkoda"	Palani Bharathi	Karthik, Sunitha Sarathy	4:29
Total length:				27:41

== Release ==
The film was released on 14 April 2005, coinciding with Tamil New Year, also clashing with the Rajinikanth-starrer Chandramukhi and Kamal Haasan-starrer Mumbai Xpress.

=== Marketing ===
ITC Limited involved in the film's promotion, which launched a special merchandise, featuring a few stills of Vijay from the film.

=== Re-release ===
On 11 February 2025, Kalaipuli S.Thanu announced the film's re-release during the summer to mark 20 years of its release. The film was re-released worldwide on 18 April 2025, after 20 years of its original release.

== Reception ==
The Hindu stated `"Sachein' is a movie that fans as well as general audience would watch for Vijay alone" and said "Vijay alone makes the movie extremely watchable". Ananda Vikatan rated the film 42 out of 100. Visual Dasan of Kalki wrote the team's captain (director) John tried to deal with a very modest screenplay with love as the ground like everyone else, and as the emotional chain between the main characters hangs loosely, his maiden attempt leaves the fans in awe. G Ulaganathan from Deccan Herald wrote "It needs some courage to release a film along with blockbusters featuring Kamal and Rajni. Vijay has done just that and in fact given the others a run for their money. A laudable achievement indeed".
