= List of accolades received by Neerja =

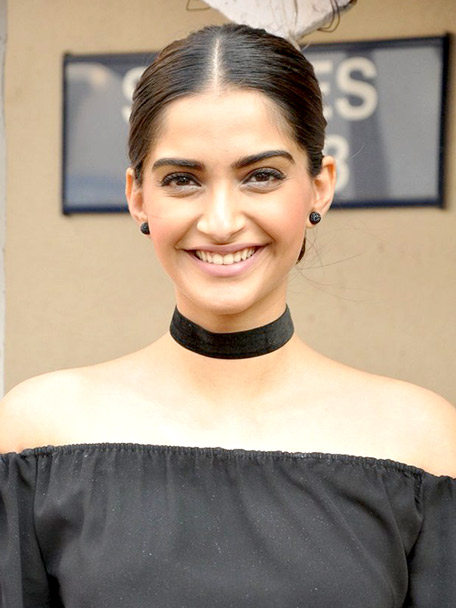
- Sonam Kapoor's portrayal of the titular character in Neerja garnered her several awards.
Accolades
Award	Won	Nominated
Asian Film Awards	0	1
Asiavision Awards	1	1
Filmfare Awards	6	11
HELLO! Hall of Fame Awards	1	1
Indian Film Festival of Melbourne	1	3
International Indian Film Academy Awards	4	7
Matri Shree Media Award	1	1
National Film Awards	2	2
Screen Awards	4	5
Stardust Awards	4	4
Zee Cine Awards	7	9
- Total number of awards and nominations (Note: Awards in certain categories do not have prior nominations and only winners are announced by the jury. For simplification and to avoid errors, each award in this list has been presumed to have had a prior nomination.)
Totals	31	45
- References

Neerja is a 2016 Indian Hindi-language biographical thriller film directed by Ram Madhvani and produced by Atul Kasbekar. The film stars Sonam Kapoor as Neerja Bhanot and features Shekhar Ravjiani, Shabana Azmi and Yogendra Tiku among others in supporting roles. The film's script and screenplay were penned by Saiwyn Quadras, the dialogue was written by Sanyuktha Chawla Sheikh, and the editing was handled by Monisha R Baldawa. Set in Karachi, the plot of Neerja centres on the Libyan-backed Abu Nidal Organization's hijacking of Pan Am Flight 73 in Karachi, Pakistan, on 5 September 1986. The film is shown from the point of view of the flight's head purser, Neerja Bhanot, who died saving passengers on the hijacked flight.

Made on a budget of ₹200 million (US$3.1 million), Neerja was released on 19 February 2016, and grossed ₹1.35 billion (US$16 million) worldwide. The film won 31 awards from 45 nominations; its direction and performances of the cast members have received the most attention from award groups.

The film won two awards at the 64th ceremony of India's National Film Awards—Best Feature Film in Hindi and Special Mention for Kapoor. At the 62nd Filmfare Awards, Neerja won six awards, including Best Film (Critics) and Best Actress (Critics); the film was also nominated for Best Director and Best Film. At the 2016 Screen Awards, it received nomination for Best Actress, and won four awards, including Best Director. Neerja won four awards at the 18th ceremony of the International Indian Film Academy Awards, including Best Film and Best Supporting Actress; it also garnered three nominations, including Best Director and Best Actress. At the 2017 Zee Cine Awards, the film won awards in seven categories, including Best Director and Best Supporting Actress.

== Accolades ==
Award	Date of ceremony (Note: Each date is linked to the article about the awards held that year, wherever possible.)	Category	Recipients	Result	Ref.
Asian Film Awards	21 March 2017	Best Supporting Actress	Shabana Azmi	Nominated	
Asiavision Awards	14 November 2016	Best Actress	Sonam Kapoor	Won	
Filmfare Awards	14 January 2017	Best Film	Neerja	Nominated	
Filmfare Awards	14 January 2017	Best Director	Ram Madhvani	Nominated	
Filmfare Awards	14 January 2017	Best Actress	Sonam Kapoor	Nominated	
Filmfare Awards	14 January 2017	Best Supporting Actor	Jim Sarbh	Nominated	
Filmfare Awards	14 January 2017	Best Supporting Actress	Shabana Azmi	Won	
Filmfare Awards	14 January 2017	Best Film (Critics)	Neerja	Won	
Filmfare Awards	14 January 2017	Best Actress (Critics)	Sonam Kapoor	Won	
Filmfare Awards	14 January 2017	Best Cinematography	Mitesh Mirchandani	Won	
Filmfare Awards	14 January 2017	Best Editing	Monisha Baldawa	Won	
Filmfare Awards	14 January 2017	Best Production Design	Aparna Sud	Won	
HELLO! Hall of Fame Awards	11 April 2016	Critics Choice	Sonam Kapoor	Won	
Indian Film Festival of Melbourne	21 August 2016	Best Film	Neerja	Nominated	
Indian Film Festival of Melbourne	21 August 2016	Best Director	Ram Madhvani	Nominated	
Indian Film Festival of Melbourne	21 August 2016	Best Actress	Sonam Kapoor	Won	
International Indian Film Academy Awards	14–15 July 2017	Best Film	Neerja	Won	
International Indian Film Academy Awards	14–15 July 2017	Best Director	Ram Madhvani	Nominated	
International Indian Film Academy Awards	14–15 July 2017	Best Actress	Sonam Kapoor	Nominated	
International Indian Film Academy Awards	14–15 July 2017	Best Actor in Supporting Role (Female)	Shabana Azmi	Won	
International Indian Film Academy Awards	14–15 July 2017	Best Actor in Negative Role	Jim Sarbh	Won	
International Indian Film Academy Awards	14–15 July 2017	Best Story	Saiwyn Quadras	Nominated	
International Indian Film Academy Awards	14–15 July 2017	Best Production Design	Aparna Sud, Anna Ipe	Won	
Matri Shree Media Award	16 April 2016	Best Feature Film	Neerja	Won	
National Film Awards	7 April 2017	Best Feature Film in Hindi	Neerja	Won	
National Film Awards	7 April 2017	Special Mention	Sonam Kapoor	Won	
Screen Awards	4 December 2016	Best Director	Ram Madhvani	Won	
Screen Awards	4 December 2016	Best Actress	Sonam Kapoor	Nominated	
Screen Awards	4 December 2016	Best Supporting Actress	Shabana Azmi	Won	
Screen Awards	4 December 2016	Best Male Debut	Jim Sarbh	Won	
Screen Awards	4 December 2016	Best Story	Saiwyn Quadras	Won	
Stardust Awards	19 December 2016	Best Supporting Actress	Shabana Azmi	Won	
Stardust Awards	19 December 2016	Best Actor in a Negative Role	Jim Sarbh	Won	
Stardust Awards	19 December 2016	Editor's Choice Best Filmmaker	Ram Madhvani	Won	
Stardust Awards	19 December 2016	Editor's Choice Best Actress	Sonam Kapoor	Won	
Zee Cine Awards	11 March 2017	Best Film	Neerja	Nominated	
Zee Cine Awards	11 March 2017	Best Director	Ram Madhvani	Won	
Zee Cine Awards	11 March 2017	Best Actress	Sonam Kapoor	Nominated	
Zee Cine Awards	11 March 2017	Best Supporting Actress	Shabana Azmi	Won	
Zee Cine Awards	11 March 2017	Best Actor in Negative Role	Jim Sarbh	Won	
Zee Cine Awards	11 March 2017	Best Male Debutant	Jim Sarbh	Won	
Zee Cine Awards	11 March 2017	Best Screenplay	Saiwyn Quadras	Won	
Zee Cine Awards	11 March 2017	Best Editing	Monisha Baldawa	Won	
Zee Cine Awards	11 March 2017	Best Production Design	Aparna Sud, Anna Ipe	Won	

== See also ==
- List of Bollywood films of 2016
