= Darshan Jalan =

Indian Costume Designer

Darshan Jalan is an Indian costume designer who works in Hindi cinema and television. He is known for his work in 3 Idiots, Kahaani 2, Ankhon Dekhi, Dum Laga Ke Haisha, Batti Gul Meter Chalu, Sui Dhaaga, Ramprasad Ki Tehrvi, Toilet: Ek Prem Katha and Mirzapur.

== Biography ==
Jalan was born on 7 April 1978 in Ranchi. He completed his schooling from the Scindia school, Gwalior. in 1996, he went to Mumbai and studied fashion design at National Institute of Fashion Technology. He started his career as a costume designer in the 2003 film Matrubhoomi. Jalan has worked with many renowned actors and film directors in Bollywood, including Amitabh Bachchan, Naseeruddin Shah, Paresh Rawal, Deepa Mehta, Rajat Kapoor, Aamir Khan, Shah Rukh Khan, Salman Khan, Shahid Kapoor, Shraddha Kapoor, Akshay Kumar, Dibaakar Banerjee, Vidya Balan, Hrithik Roshan, Abhishek Bachchan, Anushka Sharma, Varun Dhawan, Sharat Katariya and Maneesh Sharma.

== Filmography ==
=== Films ===
- Matrubhoomi (2003)
- Anwar (2007)
- The Pool (2007)
- Mithya (2008)
- The Stoneman Murders (2009)
- The Fakir of Venice (2009)
- Fatso! (2009)
- Raat Gayi, Baat Gayi? (2009)
- 3 Idiots (2009)
- Ek Tho Chance (2009)
- Dhobi Ghat (2010)
- My Friend Pinto (2011)
- Ek Thi Dayaan (2013)
- Ankhon Dekhi (2013)
- Yudh (2013)
- Peter Gaya Kaam Se (2014)
- Dum Laga ke Haisha (2015)
- Dharam Sankat Mein (2015)
- 24 (2016)
- Te3n (2016)
- Kahaani 2 (2016)
- Meri Pyaari Bindu (2017)
- Toilet: Ek Prem Katha (2017)
- Parmanu (2018)
- Batti Gul Meter Chalu (2018)
- Sui Dhaaga (2018)
- Kaamyaab (2018)
- Ekkees Tareekh Shubh Muhurat (2018)
- Ramprasad Ki Tehrvi (2019)
- Funny Boy (2020)
- The Big Bull (2021)
- RK/RKay (2021)
- Jaadugar (2022)
- Lost (2023)
- Vikram Vedha (2022)
- Goodbye (2022)
- Vadh (2022)
- Tiger 3 (2023)

=== TV series ===
- Leila (2019)
- Out of Love (2019)
- Mirzapur (2018-2020)
- Yeh Kaali Kaali Ankhein (2022)
- Sutliyan (2022)
- Escaype Live (2022)
- Tanaav (2022)
- Baahubali: Before the Beginning (TV Series)

== Nominations ==
- 21st Screen Awards - (Ankhon Dekhi) for Best Costume Design (2015)
- 62nd Filmfare Awards - (Kahaani 2) for Best Costume Design (2017)
- 4th FOI Online Awards - (Sui Dhaaga) for Best Costume Design (2018)
- 2021 Filmfare OTT Awards - (Mirzapur: Season 2) for Best Costume Design (2021)
- 7th FOI Online Awards - (Ramprasad Ki Tehrvi) for Best Costume Design (2021)
