= 21st Screen Awards =

Indian film awards ceremony in 2015

- Date: 14 January 2015
- Site: Bandra Kurla Complex, Mumbai
- Hosted by: Shahrukh Khan

Highlights
- Best Picture: Queen
- Best Direction: Vikas Bahl (Queen)
- Best Actor: Shahid Kapoor (Haider)
- Best Actress: Priyanka Chopra (Mary Kom)
- Most awards: Haider (5)
- Most nominations: Queen (14)

Television coverage
- Channel: Life OK
- Network: Star India

The 21st annual Life OK Screen Awards are the annual Life OK Screen Awards held to honor the best films of 2014 from the Hindi-language film industry (commonly known as Bollywood). The ceremony was held at Bandra Kurla Complex, Mumbai on 14 January 2015 hosted by actor Shahrukh Khan.

Queen led the ceremony with 14 nominations, followed by Haider and Kick with 12 nominations, and Highway and Mardaani with 11 nominations each.

Haider won 5 awards, including Best Actor (for Shahid Kapoor) and Best Supporting Actress (for Tabu), thus becoming the most-awarded film at the ceremony.

== Awards ==
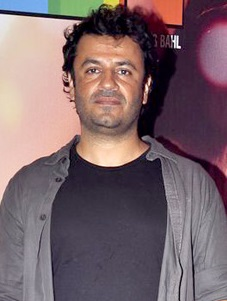
Vikas Bahl — Best Director winner for Queen

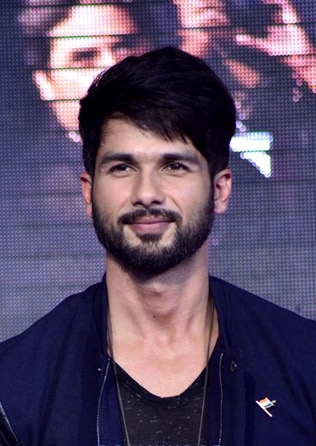
Shahid Kapoor — Best Actor winner for Haider

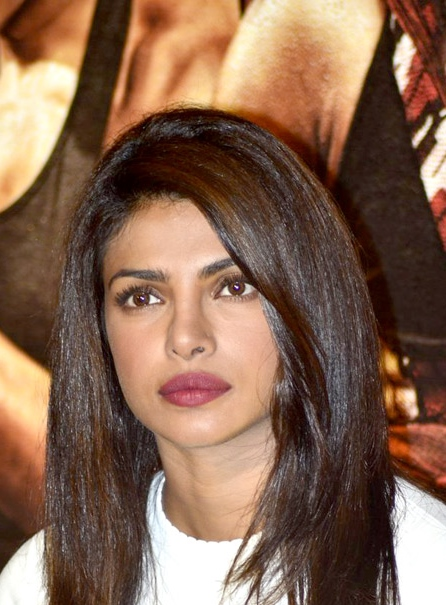
Priyanka Chopra — Best Actress winner for Mary Kom

The winners and nominees have been listed below. Winners are listed first, highlighted in boldface, and indicated with a double dagger (‡).

=== Jury Awards ===
Best Film	Best Director
**Queen – Anurag Kashyap, Vikramaditya Motwane**‡; Ankhon Dekhi – Manish Mundra; Haider – Siddharth Roy Kapur, Vishal Bhardwaj; Highway – Imtiaz Ali, Sajid Nadiadwala; PK – Rajkumar Hirani, Vidhu Vinod Chopra; Ugly – Madhu Mantena, Vikas Bahl, Vikramaditya Motwane, Arun Rangachari, Vivek Rangachari	**Vikas Bahl – Queen**‡; Anurag Kashyap – Ugly; Imtiaz Ali – Highway; Rajat Kapoor – Ankhon Dekhi; Rajkumar Hirani – PK; Vishal Bhardwaj – Haider
Best Actor	Best Actress
**Shahid Kapoor – Haider**‡; Aamir Khan – PK; Hrithik Roshan – Bang Bang!; Randeep Hooda – Highway; Sanjay Mishra – Ankhon Dekhi; Shah Rukh Khan – Happy New Year; Varun Dhawan – Humpty Sharma Ki Dulhania	**Priyanka Chopra – Mary Kom**‡; Alia Bhatt – Highway; Deepika Padukone – Finding Fanny; Kangana Ranaut – Queen; Parineeti Chopra – Hasee Toh Phasee; Rani Mukerji – Mardaani
Best Supporting Actor	Best Supporting Actress
**Inaamulhaq – Filmistaan**‡; Darshan Kumar – Mary Kom; Girish Kulkarni – Ugly; Rajkummar Rao – Queen; Viineet Kumar – Ugly	**Seema Pahwa – Ankhon Dekhi**‡; **Tabu – Haider**‡; Dimple Kapadia – Finding Fanny; Lisa Haydon – Queen; Tejaswini Kolhapure – Ugly
Best Actor in a Negative Role – Male	Best Actor in a Negative Role – Female
**Tahir Raj Bhasin** – **Mardaani**‡; Kay Kay Menon – Haider; Manav Kaul – CityLights; Riteish Deshmukh – Ek Villain; Vijay Raaz – Dedh Ishqiya	**Huma Qureshi** – **Dedh Ishqiya**‡; Juhi Chawla – Gulaab Gang; Madhuri Dixit – Dedh Ishqiya; Mona Ambegaonkar – Mardaani
Best Actor in a Comic Role – Male / Female	Best Child Artist
**Sharib Hashmi** – **Filmistaan**‡; Abhishek Bachchan – Happy New Year; Boman Irani – Bhoothnath Returns; Govinda – Happy Ending; Sandhya Mridul – Ragini MMS 2	**Parth Bhalerao** – **Bhoothnath Returns**‡; Anshika Shrivastava – Ugly; Chinmaya Agrawal – Queen; Partho Gupte, Ashfaque Bismillah Khan, Salman Chhote Khan, Maaman Memon, Thirupathi N. Kushnapelli – Hawaa Hawaai
Most Promising Newcomer – Male	Most Promising Newcomer – Female
**Tiger Shroff – Heropanti**‡; Armaan Jain – Lekar Hum Deewana Dil; Darshan Kumar – Mary Kom; Freddy Daruwala – Holiday: A Soldier Is Never Off Duty; Sasho Satiiysh Saarathy – Manjunath; Tahir Raj Bhasin – Mardaani	**Patralekha – CityLights**‡; Kiara Advani – Fugly; Kriti Sanon – Heropanti; Niharika Singh – Miss Lovely
Most Promising Debut Director	Best Ensemble Cast
**Nitin Kakkar – Filmistaan**‡; Abhishek Varman – 2 States; Omung Kumar – Mary Kom; Sajid Nadiadwala – Kick; Sandeep A. Varma – Manjunath	**Ankhon Dekhi**‡; Dedh Ishqiya; Finding Fanny; Haider; Mardaani
Best Music Director	Best Lyricist
**Ankit Tiwari, Mithoon – Ek Villain**‡; A. R. Rahman – Highway; Amit Trivedi – Queen; Arko Pravo Mukherjee, Mithoon, Pritam, Yo Yo Honey Singh – Yaariyan; Himesh Reshammiya, Meet Bros, Yo Yo Honey Singh – Kick; Vishal–Shekhar – Happy New Year	**Kausar Munir - "Suno Na Sangemarmar" – Youngistaan**‡; Amitabh Bhattacharya – "Zehnaseeb" – Hasee Toh Phasee; Irshad Kamil – "Patakha Guddi" – Highway; Kumaar – "Samjhawan" – Humpty Sharma Ki Dulhania; Mithoon – "Banjaara" – Ek Villain; Rashmi Singh – "Muskurane" – CityLights
Best Male Playback Singer	Best Female Playback Singer
**Arijit Singh – "Muskurane" – CityLights**‡; Ankit Tiwari – "Galliyan" – Ek Villain; Arijit Singh – "Samjhawan" – Humpty Sharma Ki Dulhania; Labh Janjua – "London Thumakda" – Queen; Mika Singh – "Jumme Ki Raat" – Kick	**Jyoti–Sultana Nooran – Patakha Guddi (Female Version) – Highway**‡; Jasmine Sandlas – "Yaar Naa Miley" – Kick; Kanika Kapoor – "Baby Doll" – Ragini MMS 2; Kanika Kapoor – "Lovely" – Happy New Year; Rekha Bhardwaj – "Hamari Atariya" – Dedh Ishqiya

=== Technical Awards ===
Best Story	Best Screenplay
**Rajat Kapoor** – **Ankhon Dekhi**‡; Abhijat Joshi, Rajkumar Hirani – PK; Ashim Ahluwalia – Miss Lovely; Chandraprakash Dwivedi, Ramkumar Singh – Zed Plus; Nitin Kakkar – Filmistaan	**Sandeep A. Varma** – **Manjunath**‡; Anurag Kashyap – Ugly; Gopi Puthran, S Hussain Zaidi, Vibha Singh – Mardaani; Saiwyn Quadras – Mary Kom; Vikas Bahl, Chaitally Parmar, Parveez Shaikh – Queen
Best Dialogue	Best Background Music
**Abhijat Joshi, Rajkumar Hirani** – **PK**‡; Anvita Dutt, Kangana Ranaut – Queen; Gopi Puthran, S Hussain Zaidi, Vibha Singh – Mardaani; Nitesh Tiwari, Piyush Gupta, Nikhil Mehrotra, Shreyas Jain – Bhoothnath Returns; Vishal Bhardwaj – Dedh Ishqiya	**Julius Packiam** – **Mardaani**‡; A. R. Rahman – Highway; Julius Packiam – Kick; Raju Singh – Ek Villain; Rohit Kulkarni – Mary Kom
Best Editing	Best Cinematography
**Sanjib Datta** – **Mardaani**‡; Abhijit Kokate, Anurag Kashyap – Queen; Aarti Bajaj – Highway; Aarti Bajaj – Ugly; Rajesh G. Pandey, Sanjay Leela Bhansali – Mary Kom	**Bobby Singh** – **Queen**‡; Anil Mehta – Finding Fanny; K. U. Mohanan – Miss Lovely; Rafey Mahmood – Ankhon Dekhi; Pankaj Kumar – Haider
Best Production Design	Best Special Effects
**Amit Ray, Subrata Chakraborty** – **Haider**‡; Acropolis – Kick; Nitin Chandrakant Desai – Rang Rasiya; Sukant Panigrahy, Vivek Jadhav – Bhopal: A Prayer for Rain; Tabasheer Zutshi – Miss Lovely	**Viral Thakkar – PK‡**; Prana Studios – Bhoothnath Returns; Prime Focus Ltd. – Bang Bang!; Prime Focus Ltd. – Kick; Reliance MediaWorks – Singham Returns
Best Costume Design	Best Choreography
**Manoshi Nath**, **Rushi Sharma** – **PK**‡; Anaita Shroff Adajania – Finding Fanny; Darshan Jalan, Isha Ahluwalia – Ankhon Dekhi; Manoshi Nath, Rushi Sharma – Queen; Niharika Khan – Rang Rasiya	**Ahmed Khan** – **"Jumme Ki Raat"** – **Kick**‡; Bosco–Caesar – "Tu Meri" – Bang Bang!; Bosco–Caesar – "Tune Maari Entriyaan" – Gunday; Farah Khan, Geeta Kapoor – "Manwa Laage" – Happy New Year; Ganesh Acharya – "Mere Naal Tu Whistle Baja" – Heropanti; Sudesh Adhana – "Bismil" – Haider
Best Sound Design	Best Action
**Anil Khobragade, Prabal Pradhan** – **Mardaani**‡; Resul Pookutty – Highway; Resul Pookutty – Kick; Resul Pookutty – PK; Steven Parker – Bhopal: A Prayer for Rain	**Anal Arasu** – **Heropanti**‡; Anal Arasu – Kick; Greg Powell – Holiday: A Soldier Is Never Off Duty; Parvez Shaikh – Bang Bang!; Ravi Varma – Action Jackson

=== Popular Choice Awards ===
Best Actor	Best Actress
**Shahrukh Khan** – **Happy New Year**‡; Aamir Khan – PK; Ajay Devgn – Singham Returns; Akshay Kumar – Holiday: A Soldier Is Never Off Duty; Amitabh Bachchan – Bhoothnath Returns; Arjun Kapoor – 2 States; Hrithik Roshan – Bang Bang!; Ranveer Singh – Gunday, Kill Dil; Salman Khan – Kick; Shahid Kapoor – Haider; Sidharth Malhotra – Ek Villain; Varun Dhawan – Humpty Sharma Ki Dulhania	**Deepika Padukone** – **Happy New Year**‡; Alia Bhatt – 2 States, Humpty Sharma Ki Dulhania; Anushka Sharma – PK; Jacqueline Fernandez – Kick; Kangana Ranaut – Queen; Kareena Kapoor – Singham Returns; Katrina Kaif – Bang Bang!; Parineeti Chopra – Hasee Toh Phasee; Priyanka Chopra – Mary Kom; Rani Mukerji – Mardaani; Shraddha Kapoor – Ek Villain; Sonam Kapoor – Khoobsurat

=== Special awards ===
Lifetime Achievement Award
**Hema Malini**
Ramnath Goenka Award
**Manjunath**
Life OK Hero Award – Male	Life OK Hero Award – Female
**Shahid Kapoor** (Haider)	**Alia Bhatt** (Highway)
Jodi No. 1
**Shahid Kapoor** & **Tabu** (Haider)
Entertainer of The Year
**Sajid Nadiadwala**
Best Animation	Best Film–Marketing
**Chaar Sahibzaade**	**2 States**

== Superlatives ==
Multiple nominations
Nominations	Film
14	Queen
12	Haider
12	Kick
11	Highway
11	Mardaani
10	PK
8	Ankhon Dekhi
8	Mary Kom
8	Ugly
7	Ek Villain
7	Happy New Year
6	Bang Bang!
6	Dedh Ishqiya
5	Bhoothnath Returns
5	Finding Fanny
5	Humpty Sharma Ki Dulhania
4	2 States
4	CityLights
4	Filmistaan
4	Heropanti
4	Manjunath
4	Miss Lovely
3	Hasee Toh Phasee
3	Holiday: A Soldier Is Never Off Duty
3	Singham Returns
2	Bhopal: A Prayer for Rain
2	Gunday
2	Ragini MMS 2
2	Rang Rasiya

Multiple wins
Awards	Film
5	Haider
4	Mardaani
3	Ankhon Dekhi
3	Filmistaan
3	Queen
2	CityLights
2	Happy New Year
2	Heropanti
2	Highway
2	PK
