= Kalikapur Rajbari =

Kalikapur Palace in Purba Burdhaman, West Bengal, India

- Saat Mahala Bari (mansion with seven parts)
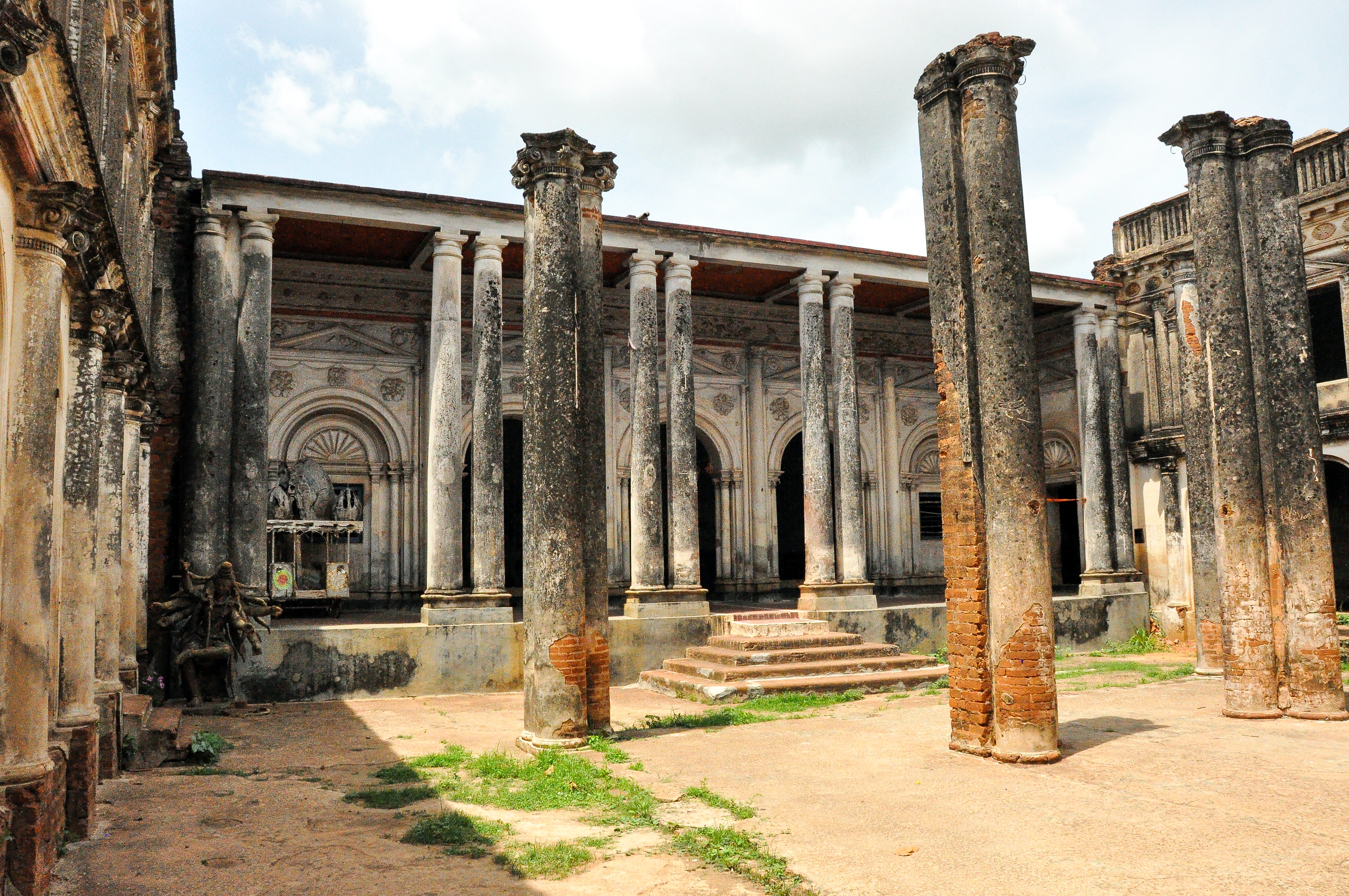
- Nat Mandir open space
- Interactive map of the Kalikapur Rajbari area

General information
- Type: Heritage building
- Location: Purba Burdhaman, Kalikapur, Maukhira, West Bengal, 731214
- Coordinates: 23.5820°N 87.5394°E
- Completed: 1819
- Opened: 1819

Kalikapur Rajbari also called Saat Mahala Bari (transl. সাত মহলা বাড়ি) is a large historic mansion with seven parts. It is a heritage palace in Kalikapur, in Purba Burdhaman district. Kalikapur is about 175 km northwest of Kolkata and near Santiniketan, West Bengal, India. The palace built in 1819, is actually an addition to a palace built in the next village of Maukhira (just 10 minutes away), which still exists. The palace/mansion in Kalikapur was built by Sadgope Zamindar Paramananda Roy, who built the seven mansions for all his seven sons along with a Durgadalan and a Nat Mandir.It is also called Kalika rajbari and spooky palace(translate in bengali that bhoutik mohol)

This joint mansion is referred to, in the local dialect as Saat Mahala Bari ("mansion with seven parts"). These seven mansions were connected to each other via a long corridor. Though many say the palace is over 350 years old, foundation stones and other research confirm it was built in 1819.

== Geography ==
Kalikapur (Bengali: কালিকাপুর; IAST: Kalikapur) is a village in Purba Burdhaman district. It is about 175 km northwest of Kolkata and is near Santiniketan West Bengal, India. Kalikapur Rajbari complex is spread over 400 bighas and the palace building is built over 20 bigha. The palace has an adjoining pond and sprawling garden.

== History ==
The Kalikapur Rajbari was commissioned by Sadgope Zamindar Paramananda Roy, a minister of the then King of Bardhaman and a zamindar. He built the seven mansions for his seven sons along with a Durgadalan and a Nat Mandir. Parmananada Roy first came to Maukhira from Guskara town of Birbhum district and established a zamindari. The Maukhira village is four km or just a ten-minute drive north of Kalikapur. As the family grew and because of regular troubles he faced due to annual monsoon floods in Maukhira, he shifted to elevated grounds at Kalikapur, where he built the Kalikapur Rajbari that was completed in 1819. The Maukhira mansion still exists.

== Current status and highlights ==
The palace is built over 20 bigha of land. Currently, only two out of the seven sections of the massive palace are in a liveable condition, and only one descendant of the Roy family lives in this mansion, as a caretaker. Currently the Roy family has over 150 members who congregate from various parts of India during Durga Puja. Besides the five sections of palace ruins that are a tourist attraction, there are two Shiva temples Parameshwar and Hanseshwar, built just outside the mansion; where regular worship of deities is performed. The highlight of these two temples is the use of exquisite terracotta artwork. These two temples were also built by Zamindar Paramananda Roy in 1839, which is mentioned in the temple foundation stones. Kalikapur Rajbari complex starts with the courtyard, which has the Natmandir. On the left is Durgadalan, where every year Durga Puja is performed by the Roy family. This Durga Puja is one of the most famous durga pujas of the district, which is also known as "seven brothers puja (transl. সাত ভাইয়ের পুজো)". Regularly celebrities from Kolkata throng the durga puja of Kalikapur Rajbari.

Durga puja in the mansion is also a tourist attraction. During durga puja, numerous traditions that were started when Kalikapur Rajbari was built continue to this day. Highlight of the Durgadalan is the stucco decoration. There is also a modern temple where daily puja is performed. The location makes the palace an ideal location for photoshoot by tourists. Another highlight is a life-size stucco face of a woman on a false window on its outer wall of one of the abandoned mahals/mansions. On a rainy day, the face referred to as ‘Batayanbartini’ or ‘The lady at the window’ (transl. বাতায়নবার্তিনী) looks realistic, giving an eerie feeling.

== Films shot at the palace ==
Popular with filmmakers, to date over 100 films have been shot in the mansion premises. The palace has been a sought-after shooting location for several Tollywood films such as Goynar Baksho (2013), গুপ্তধন রহস্য (2022), Noukadubi (2011) and Khandhar (1984) and more recently Bollywood films such as Te3n (2016) and Maa (2025).

== Kalikapur Rajbari gallery ==
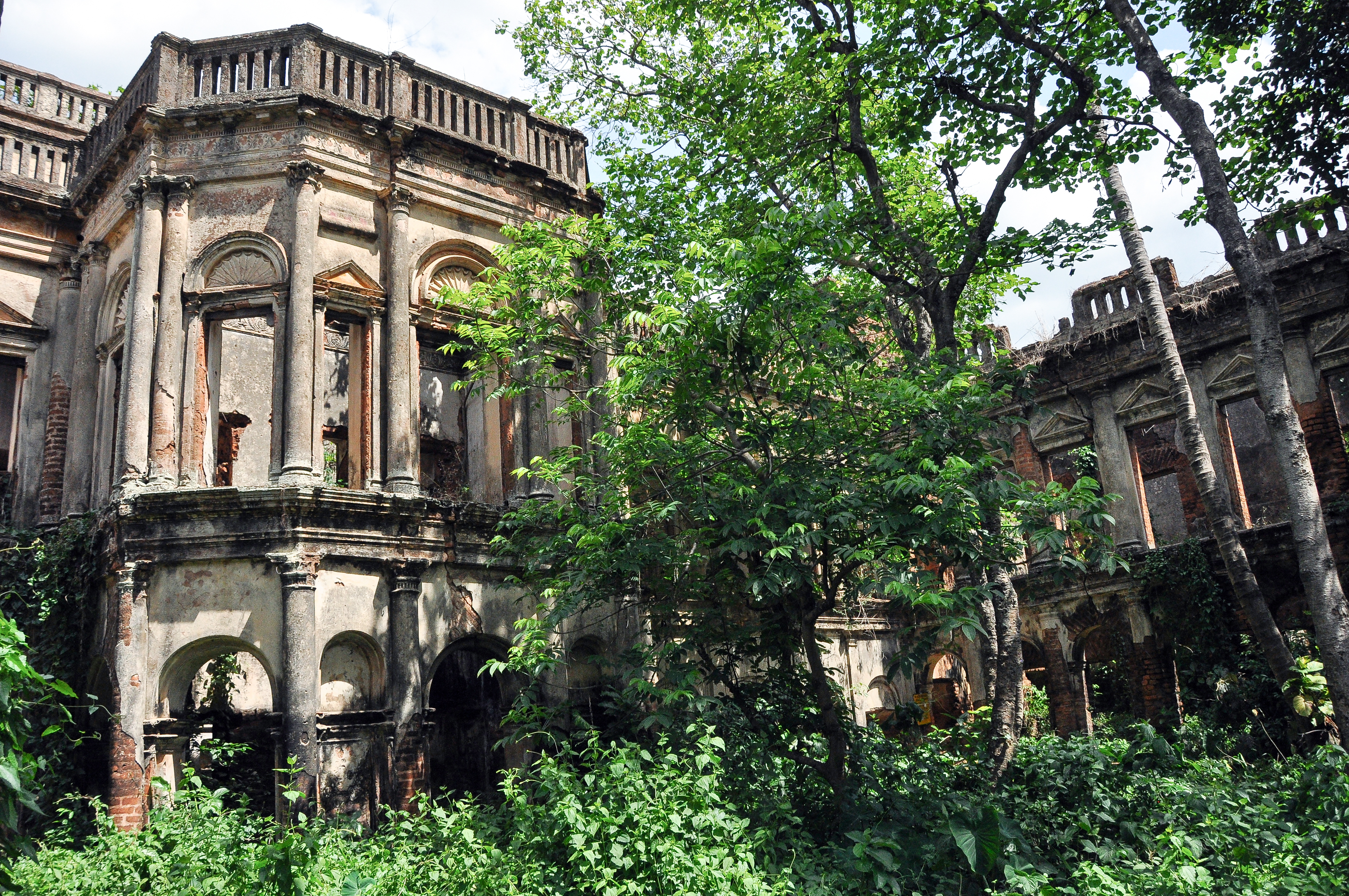
Kalikapur Rajbari

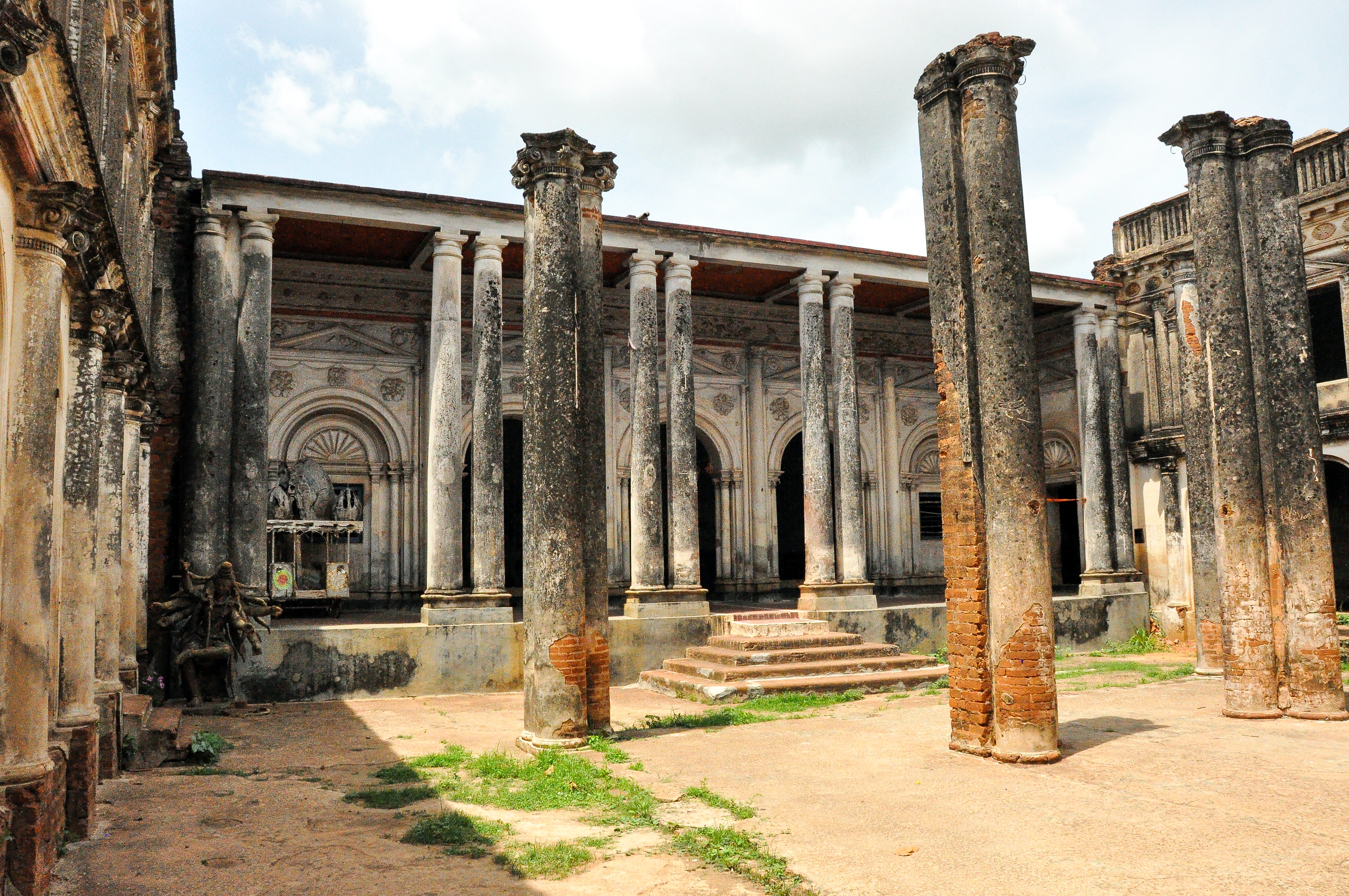
Kalikapur Rajbari

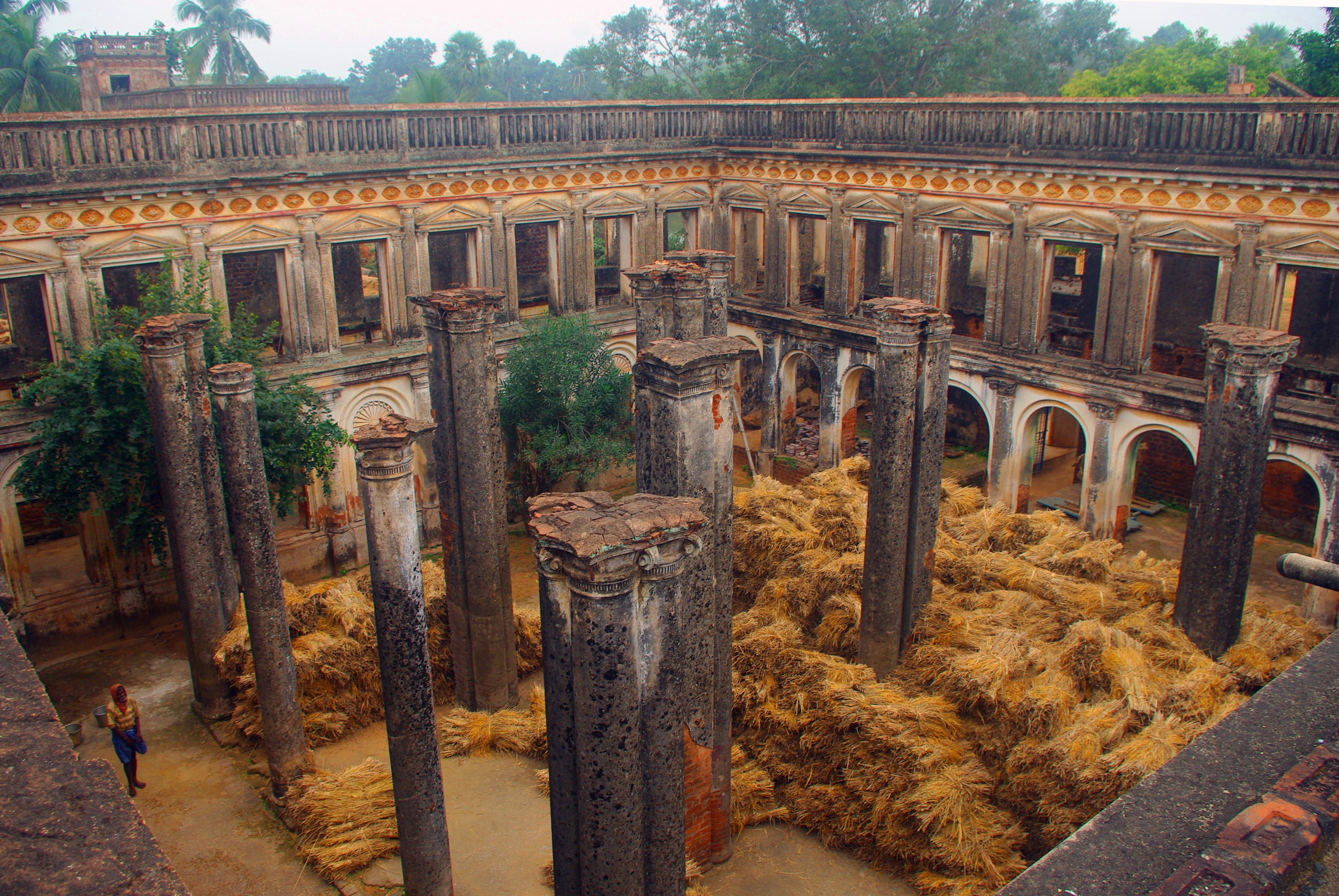
Kalikapur Rajbari

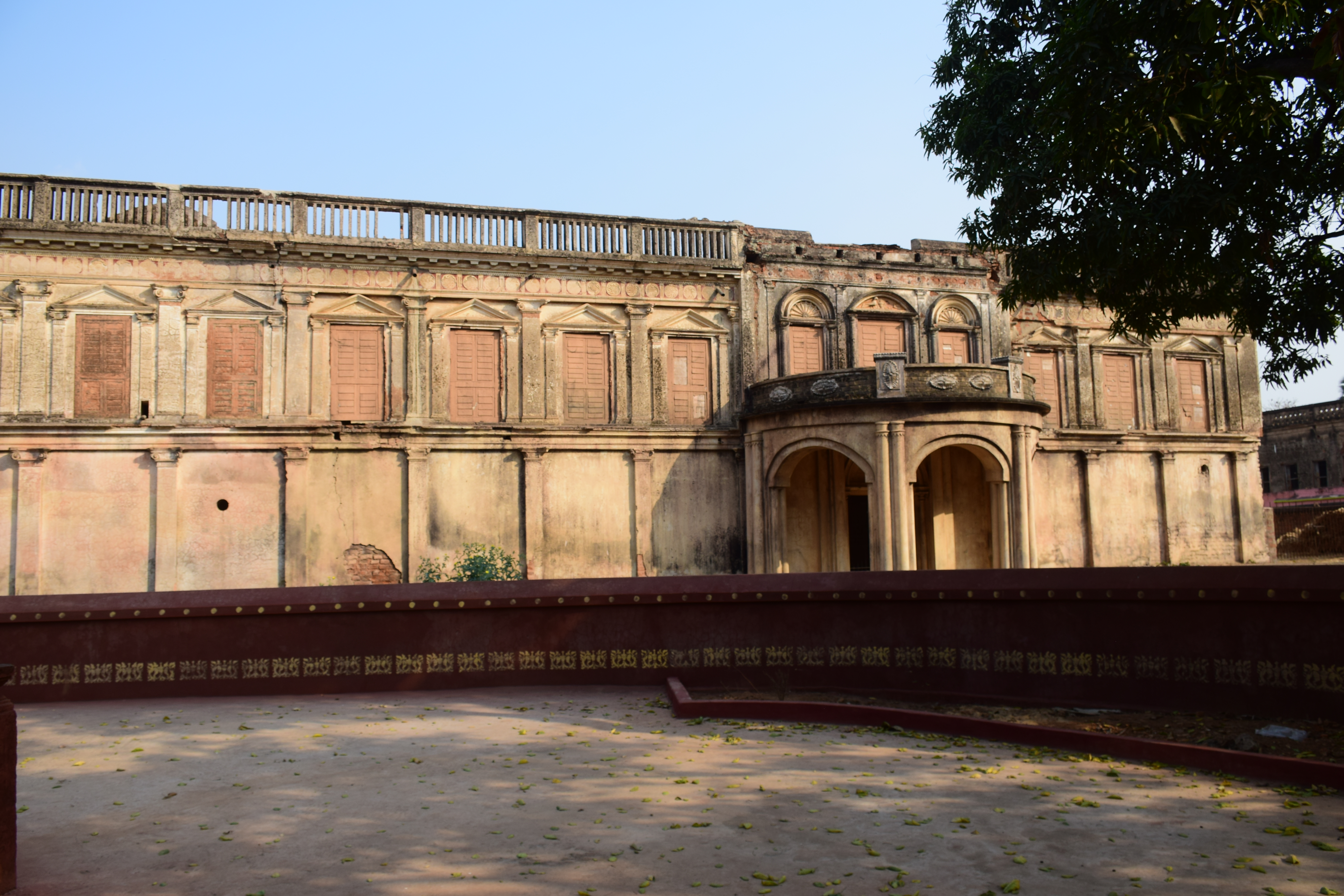
Kalikapur Rajbari

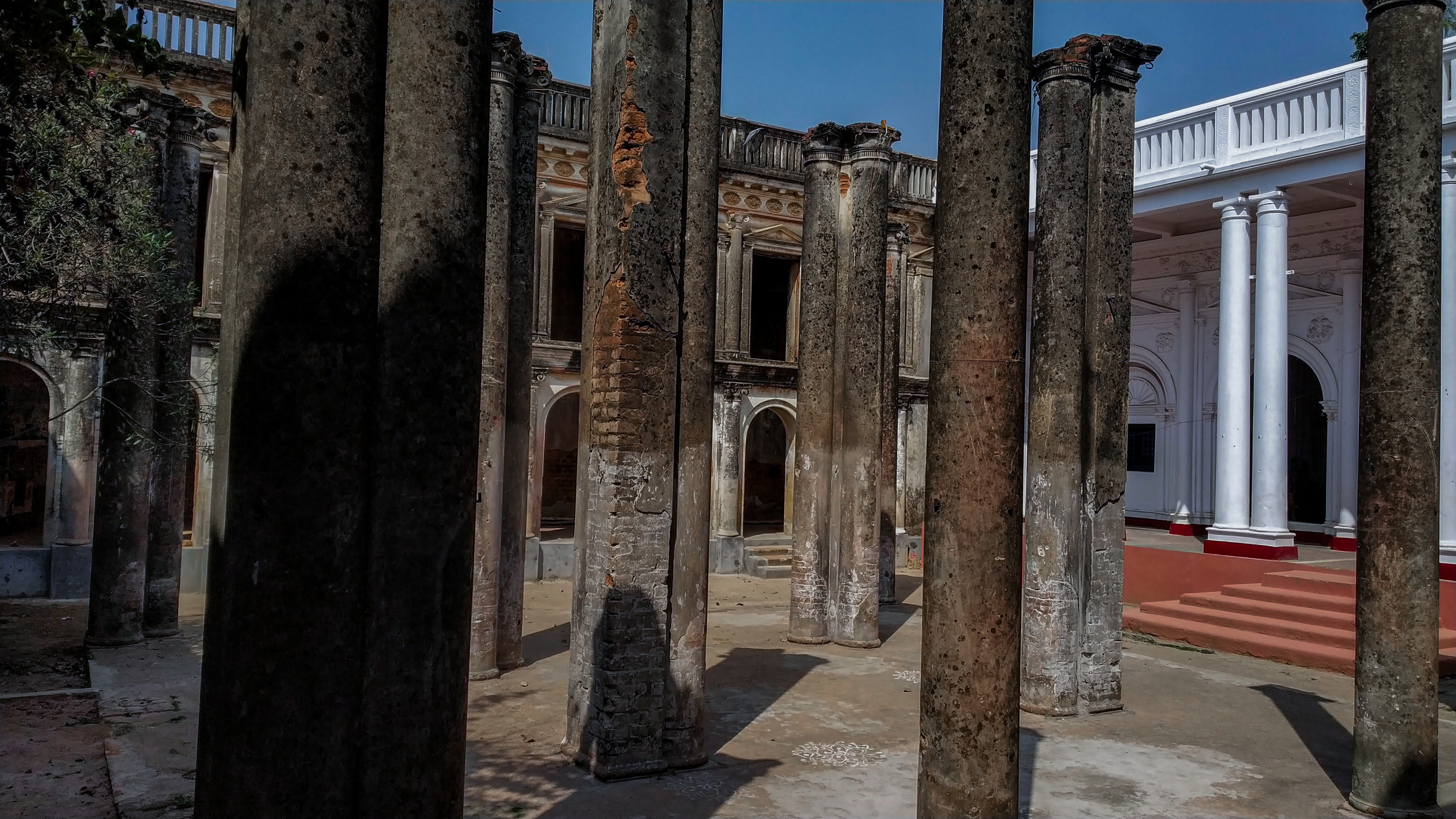
Kalikapur Rajbari

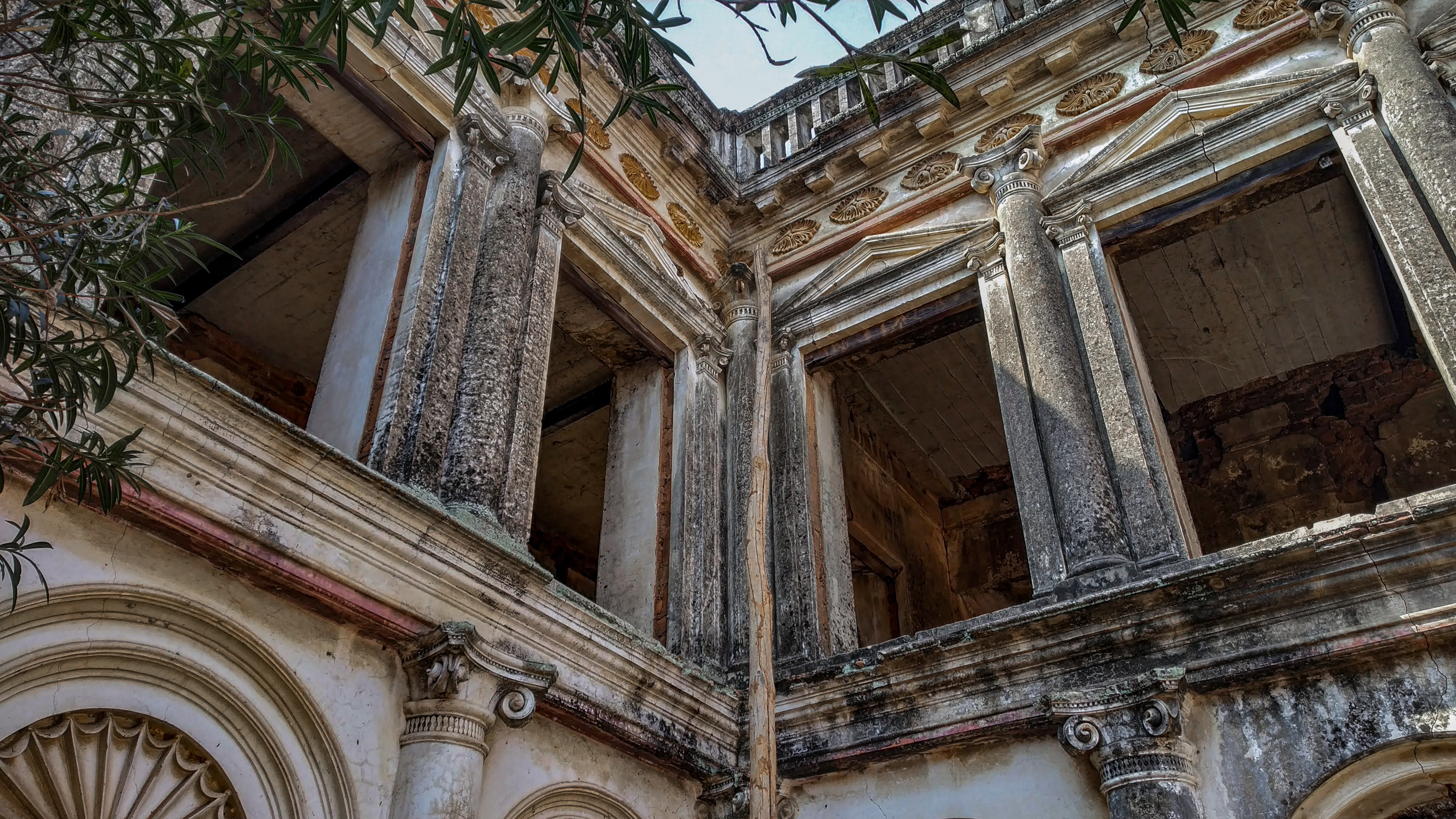
Kalikapur Rajbari

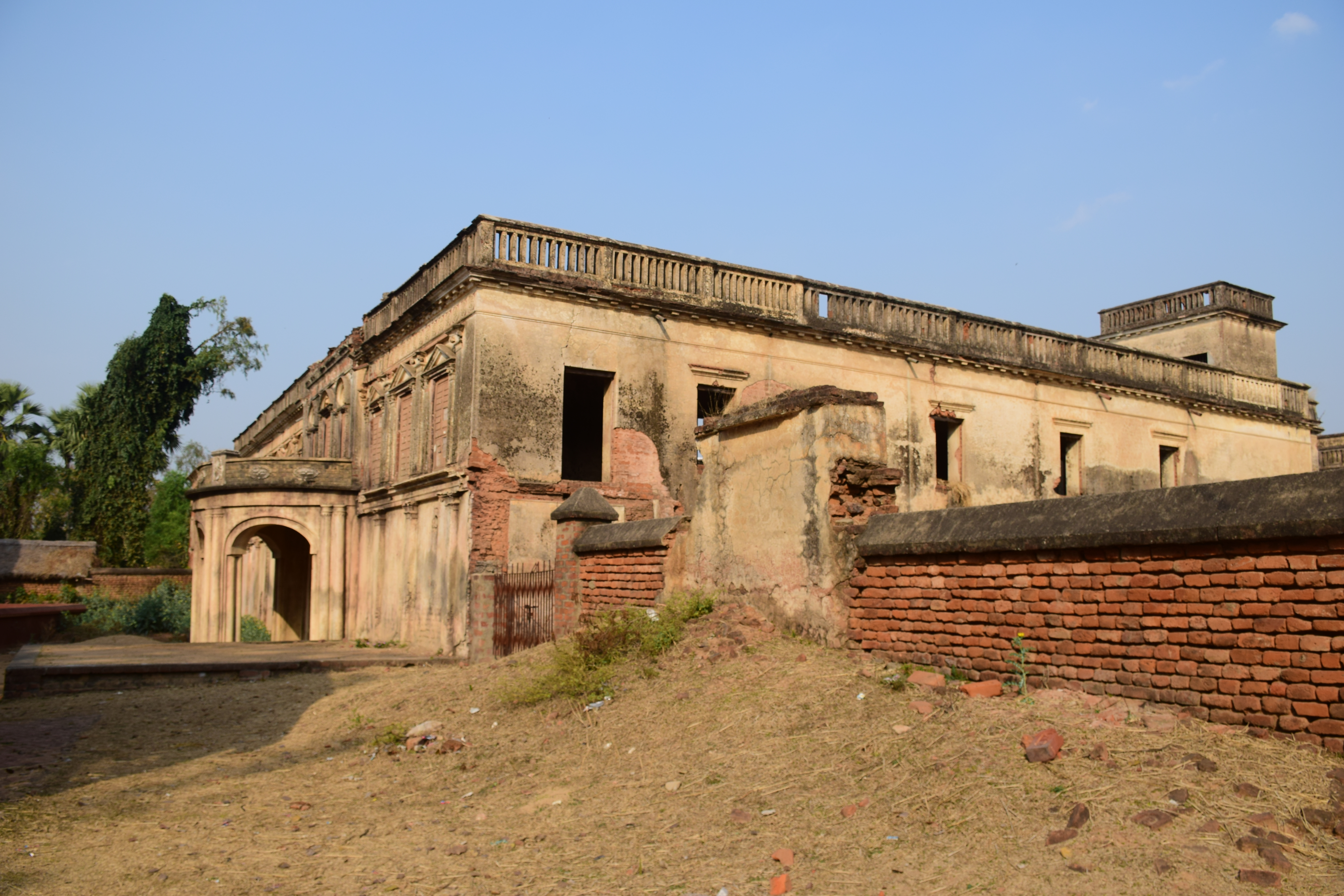
Kalikapur Rajbari

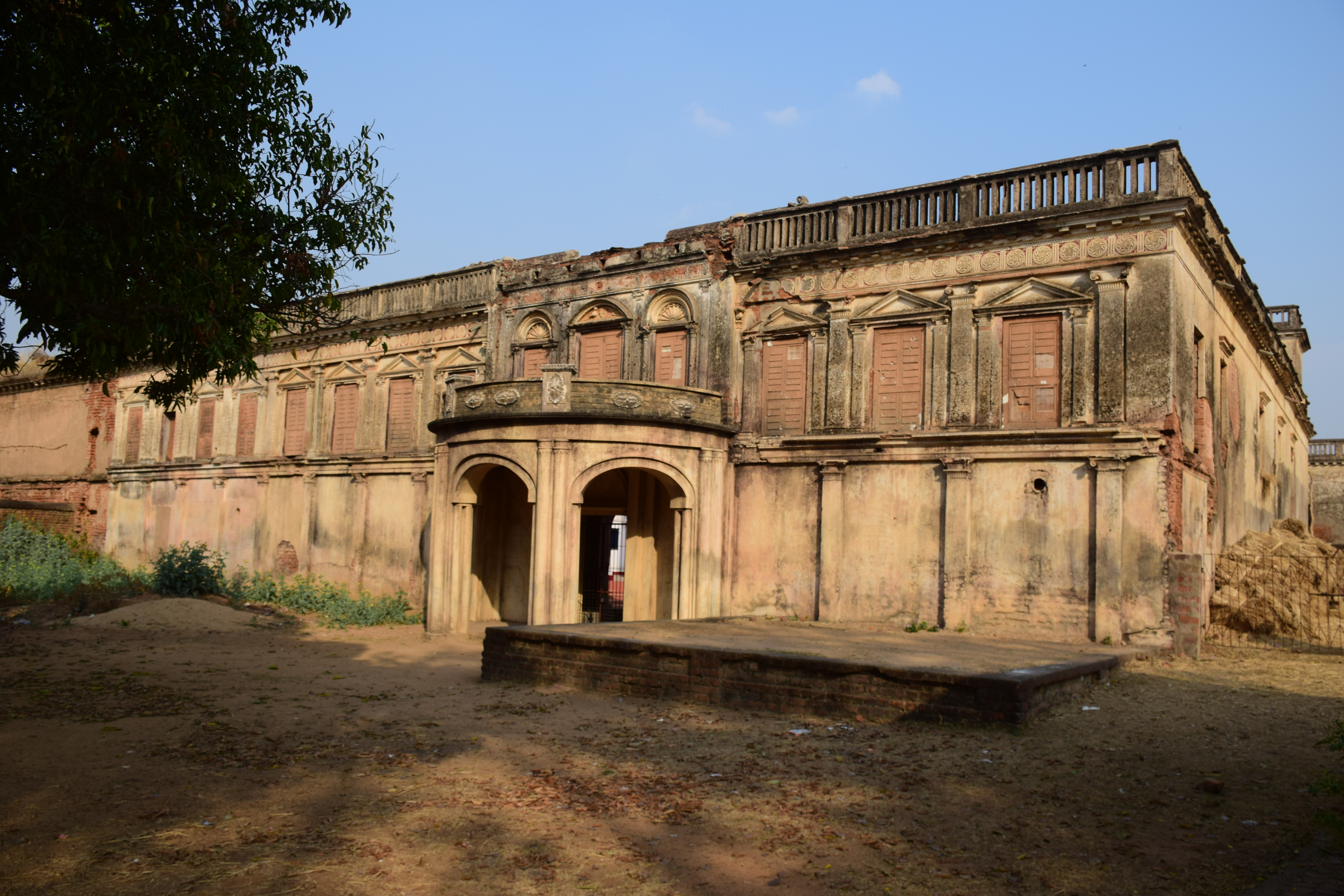
Kalikapur Rajbari
