= Maa (2025 film) =

2025 Indian film by Vishal Furia

- Theatrical release poster
- Directed by: Vishal Furia
- Screenplay by: Saiwyn Quadras
- Dialogues by: Aamil Keeyan Khan; Ajit Jagtap
- Story by: Saiwyn Quadras
- Produced by: Ajay Devgn; Jyoti Deshpande; Kumar Mangat Pathak
- Starring: Kajol; Ronit Roy; Indraneil Sengupta; Kherin Sharma
- Cinematography: Pushkar Singh
- Edited by: Sandeep Francis
- Music by: Songs: Harsh Upadhyay; Shiv Malhotra; Rocky Khanna; Background Score: Amar Mohile
- Production companies: Jio Studios; Devgn Films; Panorama Studios
- Distributed by: PVR Inox Pictures; Panorama Studios
- Release date: 27 June 2025
- Running time: 133 minutes
- Country: India
- Language: Hindi
- Budget: ₹65 crore
- Box office: est. ₹51.64 crore

Maa (transl. Mother) is a 2025 Indian Hindi-language mythological horror film directed by Vishal Furia. The film stars Kajol in the title role, alongside Ronit Roy, Indraneil Sengupta, and Kherin Sharma. It is a spinoff to the 2024 film Shaitaan, being set in the same universe. After her husband dies due to a supernatural cause, a mother and her daughter visit his ancestral village, only to discover a demonic curse that puts their lives at risk. The mother puts up a fight and defeats the demon even while making tough choices. Maa was released theatrically on 27 June 2025. It received mixed reviews from critics who widely praised Kajol's performance but criticised the script.

== Plot ==
The film starts with Kali Puja in an ancestral mansion in fictional village of Chandrapur in West Bengal. A woman gives birth to a boy during the puja, before the midwife reveals that she is having twins. The Kali Puja is being led by a woman. As Joydev and his friends watch the proceedings, his friends say he should have been leading the puja because he is the son of the sarpanch. Joydev explains the priestess was chosen because the Goddess Kali came to her in a dream. It is announced that the woman's second child is a girl. The father, the scion of a zamindar family, takes his newborn daughter despite his wife's protests to the priestess leading the puja for a ritualistic sacrifice. The priestess takes the girl to an altar on a rock in front of a huge haunted tree behind the house. She prepares for the sacrifice with a huge sword, but suddenly stops and says the Goddess Kali cannot ask for a baby girl's sacrifice. Then Joydev sensing an opportunity, snatches the sword from the priestess and, declaring it as his right, sacrifices the girl.

40 years later, Ambika, her husband Shubankar, and their 12-year-old daughter Shweta live a content life in Kolkata, West Bengal, India. It is revealed that Shubankar is the son born 40 years ago, and he is contemplating when to reveal the truth of his family to his daughter. One day, Joydev (now an old man and also the village sarpanch) informs Shubankar that his father has died. Despite Shweta's pleading, Shubankar refuses to let his daughter accompany him, as she is stunned to learn she has a grandfather. Shubankar travels to Chandrapur to cremate his father and manage the family estate. He reveals to Joydev his desire to sell the property.

While returning to Kolkata by car, Shubankar dies under mysterious and supernatural circumstances as his car catches fire, seemingly caused by a splinter from the roots of a tree (the same haunted tree where his twin was sacrificed) near his ancestral palatial home, which became embedded in his shoe. Later, a grief-stricken Ambika and Shweta travel to Chandrapur to finalize the sale of the ancestral property. There, Shweta strikes up a friendship with Deepika, the daughter of their home's caretaker, and insists on visiting the haunted tree behind the house. Deepika initially refuses but then goes along, despite being warned by all not to go, as rumor has it that there is a demon (daitya) who resides on the tree. As Shweta approaches the tree, Ambika pulls her back, and then it is revealed that Deepika has had her first period. However, the mysterious disappearances of several village girls shortly after their first menstruation cycle, who are surprisingly returned unharmed, including Deepika, forces Ambika to stay back (she had initially planned to sell off the property and return to Kolkata at earliest) and investigate. She is helped by a police officer, Sarfaraz, who is unconvinced by the rumors of a demon and believes there is a different reason.

Ambika and Sarfaraz take the girls who disappeared to the doctor, who is surprised that no girl has been harmed and is shocked that all these girls no longer menstruate. Later, Ambika receives a manuscript belonging to Shubankar from the house's old servant (the father of the current caretaker who was there when Shubankar's twin sister was sacrificed). Upon reading the manuscript, she discovers that the village is haunted by an ancient curse tied to a demon daitya named Amsaja, and involved human sacrifices, the Kali Puja ritual, and the haunted tree, which is believed to hold the malevolent daitya. The daitya is actually after Shweta, as it intends to procreate through her. Ambika tries to flee with her daughter but is stopped by Amsaja, who uses the previously abducted girls to snatch Shweta. Ambika then takes the help of Sarfaraz, who realises that Joydev is committing the crimes. Joydev reveals that he is the human face of the demon Amsaja.

Ambika has a dream of Goddess Kali, and as a ritual, she decides to perform Kali Puja in the temple of her home, which is locked. The puja is only performed when a person in the village has a dream of Goddess Kali, only then the temple doors are unlocked. As the influence of the demon, now infested in Joydev's body, grows, Ambika channels the divine wrath of the Goddess Kali, undergoing a spiritual transformation and turning into a fierce matriarchal protector. Amsaja almost kills her, but she confronts the evil force in a final effort to save Shweta and the other missing girls, and eliminates him. However, it is revealed by an old priestess (the same one who had a dream of Goddess Kali 40 years ago) that Shweta is carrying the child of Amsaja and must be sacrificed to stop the birth. Ambika reluctantly proceeds to sacrifice her own daughter for the greater good, but just before she does so, she is stopped by the priestess, who says that Ambika has passed the test Goddess Kali put her through and that the demon child inside Shweta is no more.

During the end-credits scene, Vanraj, wearing his hoodie, baggy pants, and boots, is seen walking through the ash remains of the forest, seemingly absorbing whatever was left of Amsaja's powers.

== Cast ==
- Kajol as Ambika Dasgupta (Ambii)
- Ronit Roy as Joydev
  - Naveen Sandhu as Young Joydev
- Indraneil Sengupta as Shuvankar Dasgupta
- Kherin Sharma as Shweta Dasgupta, Ambika's daughter
- Jitin Gulati as Police Inspector Sarfaraz
- Gopal Singh as Bikash
- Surjasikha Das as Nandini
- Aashit Chatterjee as Jagdish
- Dibyendu Bhattacharya as Bimal
- Roopkatha Chakraborty as Deepika
- Aayushi Lahiri as Shuvankar's mother
- Faisal Malik as Bhugwa
- Vibha Rani as Old Priestess
  - Yaaneea Bharadwaj as Young Priestess
- Nazneen Madan as Reeti Therapist
- Ajitabh Sengupta as Broker
- Aaradhya Tiwari as Possessed Girl
- R. Madhavan as Vanraj (cameo appearance)
- Tanima Bhattacharya as Woman Doctor
- Prakash Shaw as Joydev's young friend
- Aayushi Lahiri as Subhankar's mother
- Susmita Sur as Midwife

== Production ==
=== Development ===
The film was officially announced in March 2025 as an expansion of the Shaitaan universe with a motion poster. Diya Annapurna Ghosh, who is daughter of director Sujoy Ghosh actually held the title rights of 'Maa' and wanted to make the film. But Ajay Devgn one day called up Sujoy Ghosh and asked for the film title. On being asked by her father Diya readily agreed to part with the title, as the script of film was still not ready. Producer Ajay Devgn thanked both of them in the credits. Writer Saiwyn Quadras wrote the script of the film within 10 days with an idea to merge horror with Indian cultural and mythology.

=== Filming ===
Principal photography began in January 2024 in Kolkata. Filming was completed in May 2025 due to the addition of extra action scenes involving Kajol. The film has been primarily shot at three locations, including the historic Kalikapur Rajbari in Purba Bardhaman, West Bengal which is the setting for the entire story, Ramoji Film City in Hyderabad, and an iconic bakery on Park Street, Kolkata where key family moments were shot. The Kolkata schedule was shot between late March and early April 2024. During the filming of climax scene Ronit Roy suffered an injury on his back as he fell from a height of 20 feet.

== Music ==
The soundtrack is composed by Harsh Upadhyay, Rocky Khanna and Shiv Malhotra, with lyrics written by Pranav Vatsa and Manoj Muntashir.

Track listing
No.	Title	Lyrics	Music	Singer(s)	Length
1.	"Humnava"	Manoj Muntashir	Rocky-Shiv	Shreya Ghoshal, Jubin Nautiyal	3:06
2.	"Kali Shakti"	Pranav Vatsa	Harsh Upadhyay	Usha Uthup	2:53
3.	"Shubhkamnayein"	Kumaar	Sunny Inder	Ravee Mishrra	4:04
Total length:					10:03

== Release ==
Maa was released in theatres worldwide on 27 June 2025. The trailer was released on 29 May 2025. The film is one of the few rare horror movies that were released without any cuts or 'A' certificate. CBFC awarded the film 'U/A' certificate declaring it suitable for 16+ audience with parental guidance. The film was released in Bengali, Tamil, and Telugu besides Hindi. While the first motion picture was released on 10 March 2025, posters were released at regular intervals with last one just before trailer release on 26 May 2025. The film was released in 1500 screen nationwide initially, but despite that the makers were unsatisfied with number of shows allotted and time slots allotted at many places by PVR INOX, the distributors of the film.

=== Home media ===
The film began streaming on Netflix from 22 August 2025.

== Reception ==
=== Box office ===
As of 25 July 2025, Maa has grossed ₹45.19 crore in India and ₹6.45 crore in overseas, for a worldwide total of ₹51.64 crore.

=== Reviews ===
On the review aggregator website Rotten Tomatoes, 14% of 14 critics' reviews are positive, with an average rating of 5.2/10.

Bollywood Hungama gave the film 3 stars out of 5, praising the performances while criticising the visual effects, writing and the climax.

Sana Farzeen from India Today gave the film 2.5 stars out of 5, praising the visual effects and mythology while feeling the plot was predictable and lacked depth.

Shubhra Gupta from Indian Express gave the film 2 stars out of 5, finding the writing bland and the visual effects "nothing new."

Saibal Chatterjee from NDTV also gave the film 2 stars out of 5, labelling it a "confused concoction" and "way too unhinged to be earth-shatteringly terrifying."

Rahul Desai from The Hollywood Reporter India felt the villain looked like Groot from Guardians of the Galaxy, and found the film uncomfortable to watch due to its usage of horror to "legitimise the fictions of mythology."

Rishabh Suri of Hindustan Times gave 2.5 stars out of 5 and said that "Kajol's film has all the right ingredients. But the makers throw all of it into a cauldron and forget to turn the heat up."

Nishad Thaivalappil of News 18 rated 3/5 stars and writes that "As much as the film has tried to show Bengali culture and traditions, it also feels like it’s again bringing to light the kind of mumbo jumbo that’s always been doing the rounds."

Anuj Kumar of The Hindu commented that "Low on chills and thrills, director Vishal Furia's 'Chhorii' template pays diminishing returns in Bengal."

Devesh Sharma of Filmfare gave 2.5 stars out of 5 and said that "It falls to Kajol to hold the film together and she does a great job of it. Watch it solely for her performance. She’s given her hundred percent to the project and then some. But even her superlative acting can’t cover up the cracks of a badly written screenplay."

Subhash K Jha of News 24 gave 2 stars and writes in his review that "Maa seems like a cry in the dark. It desperately wants to reach out. But has no clue how to do so beyond pandering to predictability. All the tropes and terror tactics are religiously, pun intended, followed. But there is no sense of the unexpected here. It all seems overplanned, over-rehearsed and altogether underwhelming."

Nandini Ramnath of Scroll.in observed that "Maa is a poor showcase of Furia's feel for the genre. The film neither creates emotional engagement with its characters nor has the technical polish to be a convincing scare-fest. Except for a few scenes, there is a lack of atmospherics needed to carry off a tale of demonic possession."

Ganesh Aaglave of Firstpost rated 3.5/5 stars and said that "On the whole, Maa is a gripping mythological horror, which will keep you glued to the big screen."

Mayur Sanap of Rediff.com rated 2.5/5 stars and commented that "What keeps the momentum going is Kajol’s fully committed performance that elevates this generic material to a surprising degree of watchability, and without any clear direction to move ahead, this so-called Devil's Universe definitely feels wonky right now."
