= Ankhon Dekhi =

- Theatrical release poster
- Directed by: Rajat Kapoor
- Written by: Rajat Kapoor
- Produced by: Manish Mundra
- Starring: Sanjay Mishra; Seema Pahwa; Rajat Kapoor; Brijendra Kala
- Cinematography: Rafey Mehmood
- Edited by: Suresh Pai
- Music by: Sagar Desai
- Production companies: Mithya Talkies; Drishyam Films
- Release dates: 5 December 2013 (SAIFF); 21 March 2014 (India)
- Running time: 101 minutes
- Country: India
- Language: Hindi

Ankhon Dekhi (transl. Through My Own Eyes) is a 2014 Indian Hindi-language drama film written and directed by Rajat Kapoor and produced by Manish Mundra. It stars Sanjay Mishra and Rajat Kapoor. The film was released on 21 March 2014. It was the opening film at the 8th annual Mosaic International South Asian Film Festival (MISAFF) 2014 in Toronto. It is Kapoor's fifth feature film and was dedicated to his idols and teachers: filmmakers Mani Kaul and Kumar Shahani. At the 2015 Screen Awards ceremony, Ankhon Dekhi won the awards for Best Supporting Actress for Seema Pahwa, Best Story and Best Ensemble Cast. The film is based on the philosophy of empiricism. Bauji (Sanjay Mishra) refuses to believe anything he is told unless he has seen it with his own eyes. The film also encompasses the Derridean philosophy of deconstructing of reality.

== Plot ==
Rajesh Bauji (Sanjay Mishra) is a man in his late 50s, living a dreary but eventful life in a small house in old Delhi with his extended family. The movie starts with Bauji narrating a dream where he sees himself flying like a bird, free from all the worldly affairs. A random incident is going to change his life in a dramatic way, though he does not realise it at the moment. Bauji's daughter has been seeing a boy who is allegedly ill-reputed in their town. When that is revealed to the family, after some deliberation, they decide to lock up the girl and go beat the wilful boy.

When they confront the boy, to Babuji he seems like a very nice person. This event radically changes his life — he decides that he will believe only what he can see, hence the title Ankhon Dekhi. After a while he refuses to worship god and treats prasad (offerings) as just another sweet. He is working as a travel agent and refuses to book tickets to Amsterdam as he has never seen Amsterdam. To uphold his ideals, he quits his job. He resorts to a very idealistic mode and takes things to extreme levels to explore his theory. At first his neighbours consider him a lunatic, but over time they start admiring his logical reasoning and start following him.

Once while intervening in a petty loan issue with a loan shark, he refuses to believe the bad reputation of the shark. He concludes that he is a good person, based on his observation. He forms a rapport with the loan shark and is recruited by him in his illegal gambling den. His followers join.

He agrees to get his daughter married to the boy she loves and almost sorts out the emotional issues with his estranged brother.

Now, he has no blind spots and a lot of clarity. He takes his wife for a vacation.

While chatting he narrates to his wife that he feels very light, like a bird flying in free skies. His wife jokes about his experience, inadvertently challenging his own theory that he doesn't know how a bird actually flies. In the middle of the night he walks towards a cliff. Bauji narrates the dream that the movie starts with. He has yet to experience flying. As the film ends, Bauji is seen flying down a cliff.

== Cast ==
- Sanjay Mishra as Rajesh Bauji
- Rajat Kapoor as Rishi Chacha
- Seema Pahwa as Amma
- Namit Das as Ajju
- Shripad Raorane as Sharma Ji
- Brijendra Kala as Shibbo Babu
- Manu Rishi as Sharma Ji
- Maya Sarao as Rita
- Taranjit Kaur as Chachi
- Chandrachoor Rai as Shammi
- Alka Chawla as Sarup Bua
- Mahesh Sharma as Bauaa
- Anil Chaudhary as Chaudhary Saab
- Shrikant Varma as Master Ji
- Manish Karnatak as Jeevan
- Dhruv Singh as Dhruv
- Saurabh Shukla as Boss
- Danish Husain as Gopi
- Yogendra Tiku as Panditji
- Chaitanya Mahawar as Ashok
- Chetan Sharma as Anil
- Shivam Sethi as Arun
- Ranvir Shorey
- Yadvinder Singh Brar as Goon
- Rajiv Narang as Gambler

== Critical response ==
Aankhon Dekhi opened to critical appreciation. Most critics praised all the performances and the deeply rich philosophical undertones of the script.

Rajeev Masand of CNN-IBN gave the film 3.5/5 stars stating, "Through the wonderfully whimsical Ankhon Dekhi, writer-director Rajat Kapoor shows us how the journey could be more meaningful if we lived life the way we choose to."

Anupama Chopra of Hindustan Times gave 3.5/5 and mentioned, "the strands come together with such a heave of emotion that I found myself wiping away tears. Ankhon Dekhi is a lovely respite from the formulaic fare that clutters our multiplexes week after week."

Independent film scholar Baradwaj Rangan praised the acting and casting stating "Watching Rajat Kapoor's marvellous Ankhon Dekhi, you may find yourself wishing that we had one of those "Outstanding Performance by a Cast in a Motion Picture" awards. The casting is perfect, the performances exquisite. It's a cliché to say that an actor has "lived" his role – but that sense of not-acting-but-being is all-pervasive here."

Sukanya Varma of Rediff went with 4/5 stars, saying "For all its existentialism crisis, Aankhon Dekhi's heart lies in Kapoor's affectionate depiction of humdrum living, the tender father-daughter relationship between Bauji and Rita (Maya Sarao), the unspoken attachment between him and his younger brother and the concerned anxiety of his rock solid wife."

Shubra Gupta of Indian Express, usually a very harsh critic, gave the film a surprising 4/5, mentioning about the central character, "He is fool, clown and man, all in one. He is us. I have seen it with my own eyes, and I can tell you that Aankhon Dekhi is a fine, fine film."

One of the few differing voices was Madhureetha Mukherjee of India Today who gave 2.5/5 stars stating "What doesn't work for the film is the fact that it borders on abstract at regular intervals and lacks continuity, making a few scenes and conversations seem out-of-context." However, she still recommended that people watch it.

== Awards ==
Filmfare Awards

- Won – Filmfare Award for Best Film (Critics) 2014
- Won – Filmfare Award for Best Actor (Critics) 2014 – Sanjay Mishra
- Won – Filmfare Award for Best Story 2014 – Rajat Kapoor

Screen Awards

- Won – Star Screen Award for Best Story – Rajat Kapoor
- Won – Star Screen Award for Best Supporting Actress – Seema Pahwa [Shared with Tabu who won it for Haider]

Mirchi Music Awards

- Nominated - Raag-Inspired Song of the Year 2014 - "Aayi Bahaar"

== Music ==
Ankhon Dekhi

Soundtrack album by Sagar Desai
- Released: 4 March 2014
- Genre: Feature film soundtrack
- Length: 20:27
- Language: Hindi
- Label: Times Music
External audio
- Audio Jukebox on YouTube

Ankhon Dekhi features an unusual soundtrack combining Indian classical melodies with modern rhythms. The soundtrack was well received, with many calling it a 'breath of fresh air' due to the melodies being composed with classical instruments.

All lyrics are written by Varun Grover; all music is composed by Sagar Desai.

| No. | Title | Singer(s) | Length |
|---|---|---|---|
| 1. | "Aaj Laagi Laagi Nai Dhoop" | Kailash Kher | 04:03 |
| 2. | "Aayi Bahaar" | Kailash Kher | 03:32 |
| 3. | "Kaise Sukh Soyein" (A Hindustani classical song based on raga Behag) | Ronkini Gupta | 02:42 |
| 4. | "Yaad Saari Baari Baari" | Kailash Kher | 03:35 |
| 5. | "Hakka Bakka" | Shaan | 02:35 |
| 6. | "Dheeme Re Re" | Mansheel Gujral | 04:05 |
| Total length: | | | 20:27 |
