= Screen Award for Best Story =

Annual film award in India

The winners of the Star Screen Awards for Best Story are listed below:

== List of winners ==
Year	Writer/s	Film
1995	K.K. Singh	Krantiveer
1996	Ashok Kaul	Param Vir Chakra
1997	Gulzar	Maachis
1998	Kamal Haasan	Virasat
1999	Mahesh Bhatt	Zakhm
2000	John Matthew Matthan	Sarfarosh
2001	Mahesh Manjrekar	Astitva
2002	Madhur Bhandarkar	Chandni Bar
2003	Meghna Gulzar	Filhaal
2004	Amrita Pritam	Pinjar
2005	Aditya Chopra	Veer-Zaara
2006	Nagesh Kukunoor	Iqbal
2007	Rajkumar Hirani & Abhijat Joshi	Lage Raho Munnabhai
2008	Amol Gupte	Taare Zameen Par
2009	Neeraj Pandey	A Wednesday!
2010	Imtiaz Ali	Love Aaj Kal
2011	Amit Rai	Road to Sangam
2012	Akshat Verma	Delhi Belly
2013	Sujoy Ghosh & Advaita Kala	Kahaani
2014	Mohan Sikka	B.A. Pass
2015	Rajat Kapoor	Ankhon Dekhi
2016	V. Vijayendra Prasad	Bajrangi Bhaijaan
2017	Saiwyn Quadras	Neerja
2018		
2019	Arijit Biswas & Sriram Raghavan	Andhadhun

== See also ==
- Screen Awards
