= Yogendra Tikku =

Indian actor

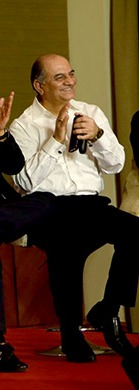
- Tiku at the success bash of his film Neerja in 2016
- Born: Prayagraj, Uttar Pradesh, India
- Occupation: Actor

Yogendra Tiku is an Indian film, television and stage actor, born and brought up at Prayagraj. He has been successful in entertainment industries including theater plays, TV serials and Bollywood movies, like No One Killed Jessica (2011), Queen (2014), Neerja, Parmanu: The Story of Pokhran. He appeared latest in the movie His Story of Itihaas.

== Production credits ==
- Pappa Ko Ho Gaya Pyar
- Paisa Paisa Paisa
- Shakuntala (writer and director)
- Mahavir... (writer and director)
- Beeswin (writer)
- Gandhi (Writer)

== Filmography ==
=== Actor ===
- English August (1994)
- Everybody Says I'm Fine! (2001)
- No One Killed Jessica (2011)
- Losing Gemma (2006)
- Dabangg 2 (2012)
- Bajatey Raho (2013)
- Queen (2014)
- Ankhon Dekhi (2014)
- Neerja (2016)
- Fan (2016)
- Brij Mohan Amar Rahe (2018)
- Parmanu: The Story of Pokhran (2018)
- Zoya Factor (2019)
- Chaman Bahar (2020)
- Kakuda (2024)
- His Story of Itihaas (2025)

Television

- Rangbaz (Web series ) Zee5
- Home Sweet Office (Web series on YouTube)
- Love Ka Hai Intezaar
- Bas Itna Sa Khwab Hai
- Shadow on the Sun
- One Day in Bhopal
- Dupahiya
- Mitti
