= Parmanu: The Story of Pokhran =

2018 Indian film directed by Abhishek Sharma

- Theatrical release poster
- Directed by: Abhishek Sharma
- Written by: Saiwyn Quadras; Abhishek Sharma; Sanyuktha Chawla Shaikh
- Produced by: John Abraham; Zee Studios; KYTA Productions
- Starring: John Abraham; Diana Penty; Boman Irani
- Cinematography: Aseem Mishra; Zubin Mistry
- Edited by: Rameshwar S. Bhagat
- Music by: Songs: Sachin–Jigar; Jeet Gannguli (1 song); Background Score: Sandeep Chowta
- Production companies: Zee Studios; JA Entertainment; KYTA Productions
- Distributed by: Pooja Entertainment (India); Zee Studios International (Overseas)
- Release date: 25 May 2018
- Running time: 129 minutes
- Country: India
- Language: Hindi
- Budget: ₹35 crore
- Box office: est. ₹91.38 crore

Parmanu: The Story of Pokhran (transl. Atom; Hindi pronunciation: [pəɾmaːɳʊ]) is a 2018 Indian Hindi-language historical thriller film directed by Abhishek Sharma and jointly written by Saiwyn Quadras, Sanyuktha Chawla Sheikh and Sharma. It was produced by Zee Studios, JA Entertainment and KYTA Productions banners. The film is based on the nuclear bomb test explosions conducted by the Indian Army at Pokhran in 1998. It stars John Abraham, Diana Penty and Boman Irani.

Parmanu was earlier slated to release on 8 December 2017, but was postponed to avoid clashing with Padmaavat (2018). It was further delayed owing to conflicts between the producers of the film, Abraham and KriArj Entertainment. It was eventually released on 25 May 2018.

== Plot ==
In 1995, Ashwat Raina, an IAS officer from the Research and Analysis Wing, suggests the ministers perform a retaliatory nuclear test in response to the recent nuclear missile tests by China. However, he is ridiculed, and the PMO secretary Suresh Yadav tells him to keep the file of his plan brief. Ashwat submits the file along with a floppy containing the details, but Yadav submits a half-baked plan to the Prime Minister and ignores the floppy. The test is hastily conducted without Ashwat's involvement, who then becomes the scapegoat when an American Lacrosse satellite photographs the test preparations, and the United States warns India not to continue with the tests. As it is labelled as a failure, Ashwat is made as a scapegoat by the ministers and dismissed from his position.

Three years later, in 1998, when Shri Atal Bihari Vajpayee is sworn in as the new Prime Minister of India, Ashwat, now an IAS coaching expert, is approached by the new PMO secretary Himanshu Shukla who questions the failure of the tests. He explains the most integral part of the mission was to keep it confidential, but it couldn't happen since no one viewed the floppy. Himanshu gives Ashwat a second chance to conduct the tests, for which he starts preparing a team. Selecting five members from the BARC (Bhabha Atomic Research Centre), DRDO (Defence Research and Development Organisation), Indian Army, ISA (Indian Space Agency) and IB (Intelligence Bureau), Ashwat leads the team to Pokhran for the test setup.

As the activities begin, two local spies of the CIA and ISI are alerted, and they bug Ashwath's guest house to get the information on the nuclear test. Ashwat and the team manage to prepare the setup for the tests while distracting the Lacrosse satellite. When the material is arranged, Himanshu tells Ashwat to stop the tests due to the political climate. Ashwat nevertheless convinces him to greenlit the tests and distract media attention from Pokhran. This gives Ashwat and the team time as they now struggle to complete the tests within a shorter deadline.

One day, when a sandstorm exposes the setup, Ashwat and other officers rush to cover it before being spotted by the satellite. They manage to run to the bunker before being spotted, but the spies learn of the test when they view satellite-clicked photographs of Ashwat's vehicle parked oddly. They try to convince the CIA about the tests, but they don't believe them. The ISI Agent calls Ashwat's wife and tells him he's in Pokhran with a woman, after which she arrives at the guest house and mistakenly believes Ashwat to be having an affair with his teammate Ambalika. Ashwat tries to defend himself, but she leaves, following which Ambalika learns of this and believes it to be a setup.

On the day of the tests, the ISI agent breaks into the guest house to retrieve Ashwat's cell phone containing codes for the blindspot at the test site. He fights off Ashwat and runs away, taking the phone. A chase ensues, leaving Ashwat trapped in a police station when he mistakenly fires a bullet from the agent's gun. Ambalika arrives and frees him, and Himanshu proceeds to meet the Prime Minister and explain to him the plan. As Ashwat arrives at the test site, Ambalika and other officers capture the agents. Himanshu manages to get encrypted permission from the Prime Minister to proceed with the tests. The CIA now has the evidence sent by the spies, but the explosion takes place before they can take any action. The test is successfully conducted, Ashwat reconciles with his wife, and India is established as a nuclear state.

== Cast ==
- John Abraham as Indian Administrative Service and Research and Analysis Wing officer Ashwat Raina / Krishna Joshi
- Diana Penty as Intelligence Bureau officer Captain Ambalika Bandyopadhyay / Nakul Singh, Krishna's colleague
- Boman Irani as Himanshu Shukla, PM secretary
- Aditya Hitkari as Dr. Viraf Wadia / Yudhishthir Parashar, Krishna's colleague
- Vikas Kumar as Major Prem Singh / Bheem Rajat, Krishna's colleague
- Yogendra Tikku as Dr. Naresh Sinha / Arjun Pathak, Krishna's colleague
- Ajay Shankar as Dr. Puru Ranganathan / Sahadeva Kumar, Krishna's colleague
- Anuja Sathe as Sushma Raina, Ashwat's wife
- Darshan Pandya as a Pakistani spy
- Atal Bihari Vajpayee as Prime Minister of India

== Production ==
Parmanu was officially announced on 15 April 2017 via Taran Adarsh's Twitter handle. John Abraham was approached by film producers Prerna Arora and Arjun N Kapoor with the script, which was further developed. Parmanu was shot in Delhi and Mumbai, with major portions being shot in Pokhran, and areas of Pokhran Fort, Aada Bazaar, Gandhi Chowk Main Market and the Gomat Railway Station. The principal photography of the film began on 31 May 2017 and the shoot was completed in August. About the film, Abraham said: "Parmanu is an ode to the Army and scientists, who although ordinary people, truly accomplished extraordinary feats in the face of adversity to ensure that India finds its due place on the world nuclear map."

== Marketing and release ==
The first look of the film was revealed by Abraham through his Twitter handle on 22 June 2017. It showed his face merged with the map of Pokhran. The second poster of the film was released on 14 August 2017 which showed Abraham running with jeeps, bunkers in the background. Two posters of the film showing John and Diana in Army uniform were released on 3 November 2017.

Earlier scheduled to release on 8 December 2017, the film released on 25 May 2018 across 1935 screens.

== Soundtrack ==
Parmanu: The Story of Pokhran

Soundtrack album by Sachin–Jigar and Jeet Gannguli
- Released: 15 May 2018
- Recorded: 2017–2018
- Genre: Feature film soundtrack
- Length: 22:49
- Language: Hindi
- Label: Zee Music Company
External audio
- Audio Jukebox on YouTube

Sachin–Jigar chronology
Simran (2017)	Parmanu: The Story of Pokhran (2018)	Gold (2018)

Jeet Gannguli chronology
Total Dadagiri (2018)	Parmanu: The Story of Pokhran (2018)	Jalebi (2018)

The music of the film is composed by Sachin–Jigar and Jeet Gannguli while lyrics are penned by Vayu, Rashmi Virag, Sachin Sanghvi and Kumar Vishwas. The songs featured in the film are sung by Arijit Singh, Divya Kumar, Yasser Desai, Keerthi Sagathia and Jyotica Tangri. The first song of the film titled Shubh Din which is sung by Sagathia and Tangri, was released on 14 May 2018. The album was released by Zee Music Company on 15 May 2018.

Vipin Nair of The Hindu gave the soundtrack 2.5/5 stating that the soundtrack is a "middling start to the year" for the composer duo.

Track listing
No.	Title	Lyrics	Music	Singer(s)	Length
1.	"Shubh Din"	Vayu	Sachin–Jigar	Keerthi Sagathia, Jyotica Tangri	4:42
2.	"Jitni Dafa"	Rashmi Virag	Jeet Ganngulil	Yasser Desai	3:42
3.	"Thare Vaaste"	Vayu	Sachin–Jigar	Divya Kumar	3:28
4.	"Kasumbi"	Vayu	Sachin–Jigar	Divya Kumar	4:13
5.	"Sapna"	Sachin Sanghvi	Sachin–Jigar	Arijit Singh	2:49
6.	"De De Jagah"	Kumar Vishwas	Sachin–Jigar	Yasser Desai	3:55
Total length:					22:49

== Reception ==
=== Box office ===
The film has grossed over ₹91.38 crore (US$9.5 million) worldwide, of which ₹840 million was in India.

=== Critical response ===
On the review aggregator website Rotten Tomatoes, 33% of 12 critics' reviews are positive, with an average rating of 5/10. Parmanu received mixed to positive reviews from film critics. Bollywood Hungama rated the film 3.5/5 and predicted its financial success. The Times of India rated it 3.5/5 and wrote "What Parmanu lacks in detail and authenticity, it makes up with emotions and a sense of national pride. The narrative isn't explosive but it does have dramatic moments to keep the viewer engaged. Thrills, suspense, drama, a little bit of humor, as well as a solid comment on India's soldiers – this movie, largely has all the tricks to please even a discerning audience." Rohit Vats from Hindustan Times rated the film 3/5 and wrote "Actually, the best moments of Parmanu arrive towards the end, just when they are needed. A film that was slowly progressing towards a definite end in the first half starts to gather steam 20 minutes into the second half."

The film was criticized by some reviewers. Shrishti Negi of News18 criticized over-dramatization and twisting of facts, rating it 2/5. The opening sequence was also criticised, being called "too shaky". Kennith Rosario of The Hindu felt the film was "simplistic" and had "all the ingredients to be a propaganda film". Shubhra Gupta of The Indian Express criticised the film for its lack of details and use of historical facts, calling it "all surface, no depth", and gave it 1.5 stars. Deccan Chronicle also gave it 1.5 stars out of 5 in its review by Arnab Banerjee, saying that the seriousness of the film didn't come across as it looked like a "picnic with a little bit of work thrown in here and there".
