= Saiwyn Quadras =

Indian screenwriter

- Occupation: Writer
- Years active: 2014-present

Saiwyn Quadras is an Indian screenwriter, who has written the biopics Mary Kom (2014), Neerja (2016) and Maidaan (2024). He was also the writer of Parmanu: The Story of Pokhran (2018).

== Career ==
He began his career in the entertainment industry as a screenwriter, working on several critically acclaimed films such as "Neerja" (2016), "Mary Kom" (2014).

In 2017, he won the National Film Award for Best Screenplay for "Neerja" and was also nominated for the Filmfare Award for Best Screenplay for the same film.

Quadras is also a mentor and a speaker in the Indian film industry, known for his work with aspiring screenwriters and filmmakers.

== Filmography ==
- Mary Kom (2014)
- Neerja (2016)
- Parmanu: The Story of Pokhran (2018)
- Maidaan (2024)
- Maa (2025)
- Kalam: The Missile Man of India

== Awards ==
Year	Film	Award and category	Result
2025	Maidaan	Filmfare Award for Best Screenplay (Adapted)	Nominated
2015	Mary Kom	Screen Award for Best Screenplay	Nominated
2015	Mary Kom	Producers Guild Film Awards for Best Screenplay	Nominated
2017	Neerja	IIFA Award for Best Story	Nominated
2017	Neerja	Screen Award for Best Story	Won
2017	Neerja	Zee Cine Award for Best Screenplay	Won
