= Neerja =

2016 film by Ram Madhvani

- Theatrical release poster
- Directed by: Ram Madhvani
- Written by: Saiwyn Quadras
- Dialogues by: Sanyuktha Chawla Shaikh
- Produced by: Atul Kasbekar; Shanti Sivaram Maini
- Starring: Sonam Kapoor
- Cinematography: Mitesh Mirchandani
- Edited by: Monisha R. Baldawa
- Music by: Vishal Khurana K
- Production companies: Bling Unplugged; Fox Star Studios
- Distributed by: Fox Star Studios
- Release date: 19 February 2016
- Running time: 121 minutes
- Country: India
- Language: Hindi
- Budget: ₹20 crore
- Box office: est. ₹135.52 crore

Neerja is a 2016 Indian biographical thriller film directed by Ram Madhvani and written by Saiwyn Quadras and Sanyuktha Chawla Shaikh. It was produced by Atul Kasbekar's company, Bling Unplugged, alongside Fox Star Studios. The film stars Sonam Kapoor as the eponymous lead, with Shekhar Ravjiani, Shabana Azmi, Yogendra Tiku, Kavi Shastri and Jim Sarbh in supporting roles.

The plot is based on a real-life event: the attempted hijacking of Pan Am Flight 73 in Karachi, Pakistan by Libyan-backed Abu Nidal Organization in September 1986. The film is shown from the point of view of the head purser of the flight, Neerja Bhanot, who thwarted the hijack attempt by alerting the pilots, thus grounding the plane. Bhanot died trying to help save the passengers and crew, of whom 359 of the 379 on board survived.

Development began in September 2014, when Kasbekar signed Madhvani and Kapoor for a film to be made by Bling Unplugged and Fox Star Studios. Saiwyn Quadras and Sanyuktha Chawla worked on the script, with principal photography taking place in Mumbai. The film features music by Vishal Khurana K, with lyrics written by Prasoon Joshi. Neerja was released on 19 February 2016 to critical acclaim and became one of the highest grossing Bollywood films featuring a female protagonist. The film grossed ₹135.52 crore (US$14 million) at the box office.

The film received widespread critical acclaim and numerous accolades from Bollywood award organisations, with particular praise for Kapoor's performance and Madhvani's direction. It won 2 awards at the 64th National Film Awards - Best Feature Film in Hindi and Special Mention (Kapoor). At the 62nd Filmfare Awards, Neerja received 8 nominations, including Best Film and Best Director (Madhvani), and won a leading 6 awards, including Best Film (Critics), Best Actress (Critics) (Kapoor), and Best Supporting Actress (Azmi).

== Plot ==
On 4 September 1986, 22-year-old Neerja Bhanot arrives late for a house party one evening. Her mother, Rama, expresses concern about Neerja's job as a flight attendant, suggesting that Neerja should return to her old modelling career. Neerja insists on keeping her job. The next morning, 5 September, she is driven to Chhatrapati Shivaji Maharaj International Airport by her friend Jaideep.

Neerja boards Pan Am Flight 73 from Mumbai to New York City, with stops in Karachi and Frankfurt, West Germany. During the first leg, she reflects on her brief, unhappy arranged marriage to Naresh, a professional in Doha, Qatar, who abused her over her small dowry and inability to perform household work. She eventually returned home for a modelling contract. Naresh sent her parents a letter complaining about the dowry and their daughter's lack of domestic skills, demanding that Neerja either bring back the money or not return at all. Neerja eventually left Naresh and landed a job with Pan Am Airways.

Meanwhile in the present, the Abu Nidal organisation, a Libyan-sponsored Palestinian terrorist group, plans to hijack the plane at Karachi's Jinnah International Airport. The plane lands as scheduled wherein the four terrorists, disguised as security officers escorting a Libyan diplomat, infiltrate the airport. Neerja quickly alerts the cockpit, without the terrorists knowing, and the three American pilots escape through the overhead hatch, fleeing to the terminal under fire from the hijackers. The American pilots had just enough time to escape, as the hijackers did not realise that the cockpit of a Boeing 747-100 is on the upper level.

When a Kenyan-born Indian American passenger reveals himself as an American, one of the terrorists murders him and dumps his body off the aircraft in front of the Pakistani negotiators. The terrorists try to locate a radio engineer among the passengers by ordering Neerja to announce over the plane's PA system. When Imran Ali, a Pakistani radio engineer, begins to stand up, Neerja signals for him to sit down. The terrorists have the flight attendants collect all passports to identify the American passengers and hold them hostage; Neerja and her colleagues comply, but secretly dispose of any American passports by throwing them down trash chutes or hiding them under seats. Dejected over not finding any Americans, the hijackers find and take a British passenger hostage instead.

The Pakistani negotiators inadvertently reveal the name of radio engineer Ali, whom the hijackers bring to the cockpit to use the radio for negotiations. Meanwhile, the Pakistani authorities try to stall for time. When a younger terrorist assaults the passengers and threatens the attendants, the leader chastises him. Humiliated, the younger terrorist storms into the cockpit and shoots Ali, screaming wild threats over the radio. While negotiations with the Pakistani air controllers drag on, the negotiators slowly lose control of the situation, with the hijackers becoming more agitated by the minute. Meanwhile, Neerja, whose birthday would be in two days, opens an envelope given to her by Jaideep. The envelope has a letter from him, confessing his love to her, and a biscuit. Neerja reads the note and eats the biscuit, symbolising her acceptance of his love, of which Jaideep will never learn.

Around 17 hours later, the plane loses auxiliary power, and the lights go out inside the plane. Despite Neerja and the other attendants' attempts to explain, the terrorists assume the Pakistanis cut the power deliberately, and anticipate an imminent military raid on the plane. Panicking, the hijackers begin shooting down passengers indiscriminately; at great peril to her own life, Neerja opens the emergency exit door and deploys the chute, directing passengers out of the plane. Choosing to let the passengers escape first, Neerja is shot three times by one of the hijackers as she tries to shield three young children from the gunfire. The children all escape the plane, and Neerja then drags herself out of the doorway and down the emergency slide before succumbing to her injuries. The Special Service Group storms the plane, wounding and incapacitating the terrorists, all of whom who would be later tried in Pakistan and sentenced to life in prison.

The film ends with a tribute to Neerja, who was eventually honoured posthumously with several awards, including the Ashoka Chakra, India's highest military decoration awarded for peacetime valour, courageous action or self-sacrifice.

== Cast ==
- Sonam Kapoor as Neerja Bhanot
- Shekhar Ravjiani as Jaideep, Neerja's love interest
- Yogendra Tiku as Harish Bhanot, Neerja's father
- Shabana Azmi as Rama Bhanot, Neerja's mother
- Kavi Shastri as Naresh Mishra, Neerja's ex-husband from an arranged marriage
- Ali Baldiwala as Mansoor, one of the terrorists
- Vikrant Singta as Fahad, one of the terrorists
- Abrar Zahoor as Zayd Safirini, one of the terrorists
- Jim Sarbh as Khalil, one of the terrorists
- Manya Chopra as Bhavika Desai
- Shaurya Chopra as Shaurya Desai
- Aarush Rana as Jatin Desai
- Anjali Khurana as Dolly
- Sunanda Wong as Tina
- Eisha Chopra as Debina
- Meghana Kaushik as Sanjana
- Arjun Aneja as Aneesh Bhanot, Neerja's brother
  - Arjun Kapoor as an infant Aneesh Bhanot (Photograph only)
- Nikhil Sangha as Akhil Bhanot, Neerja's brother
- Ismail Mohammed Mirza as Al Turk
- Shashi Bhushan as radio engineer Emran Ali (based on Meherjee Kharas)
- Deepak Shah as brigadier
- Vidya Raj Sharma as Vidya Shetty, a pregnant passenger
- Sushil Tyagi as Inzamam Younis
- Prashantt Guptha as Rahul Kumar
- Alex Kozyrev as Ronnie Huston (based on Michael John Thexton)

== Production ==
=== Development and pre-production ===
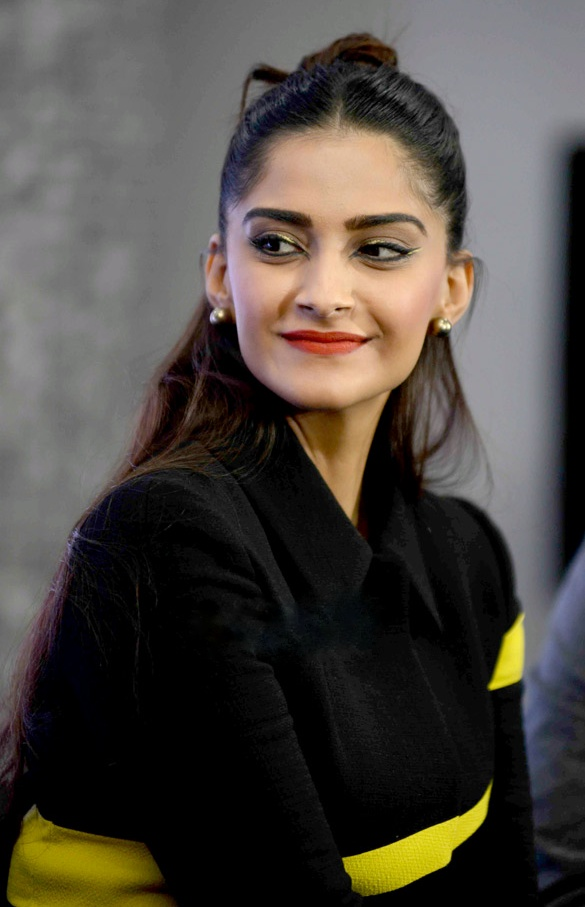
Actress Sonam Kapoor was selected to play the titular character of Neerja Bhanot

Pre-production work on Neerja began in September 2014, when the film's executive producer Atul Kasbekar said that his company, Bling Unplugged, would co-produce Ram Madhvani's film along with Fox Star Studios. Kasbekar later tweeted, "Do U Know Who Neerja Bhanot Is? No? Well U Really Really Should...". He said, "For us [...], a story of courage as exceptional as Neerja's simply deserved to be told. We just decided that we would do our bit to ensure that India would remember one of its great heroines."

The film's script and screenplay were penned by Saiwyn Quadras, and the dialogue was written by Sanyuktha Chawla Sheikh. The director of photography for the film was the cinematographer Mitesh Mirchandani, who had been previously associated with 2012 film Luv Shuv Tey Chicken Khurana. The editing for the film was done by Monisha R Baldawa and Manohar Verma served as the stunt director for the film.

Kapoor was contracted by Kasbekar to play Neerja Bhanot, the senior flight crew member. On receiving the role of Neerja in the film, Kapoor told the Press Trust of India (PTI), "I thought doing this film just reaffirms that it is about not bowing down. It is an inspiring story for me to do. I am blessed." It was reported in May 2015 that Shekhar Ravjiani, one half of Bollywood's performing/producing duo Vishal–Shekhar, would play a short role in the movie, marking his acting debut. Shabana Azmi played the role of Neerja's mother Rama Bhanot in the film. In an interview with The Indian Express, Azmi describes her character and explains, "It was very difficult to play her, particularly the last scene where Rama addresses an audience. It is an extremely well-written emotional scene, which does complete justice to the moment."

=== Filming and post-production ===
"So Ram you're making this film Neerja, do you realize the responsibility that you have? You're actually going to be building a set, you're not even using a real plane and then you're going to get people as passengers. Do you realize what actually happened on that plane [...]?"

— A journalist friend of Ram Madhvani

Principal photography of the film commenced 19 April 2015 in Mumbai. After two months of filming, the shooting was wrapped up on 19 June 2015. Kasbekar tweeted, "Amazing! And it's a wrap on Neerja !!! 32 shooting days!!! That's Two More days than Birdman took!" During the principal photography of the film, many Bollywood celebrities visited the film's sets, including Vidya Balan, Boman Irani, Anil Kapoor, and Raju Hirani. "I knew that getting Aamir Khan, Boman Irani, Vidya Balan, Raju Hirani and Anil Kapoor to speak to the 220 cast would help instill dedication and effort that this film would require," director Madhvani said in a statement.

The makers of the film acknowledged the responsibility of portraying the story. One challenge faced was acquiring an actual Boeing 747 for shooting. Director Ram Madhvani and Rucha Pathak initially thought of shooting in Abu Dhabi, UAE or the United States due to the convenience of leasing a retired 747 but later decided to re-create the plane because a major part of the film required shooting against the plane backdrop. The plane set took 48 days to build and closely resembled the actual aircraft.

The film's visual effects (VFX) were by Tata Elxsi. VCL (Note: The full name of VCL is Visual Computing Labs.) produced a wide range of visual effects, including the creation of Karachi airport and buildings, and also helped in creating the 1986 period restoration for various locations.

== Music ==
The film's soundtrack is composed by Vishal Khurana K with lyrics written by Prasoon Joshi. The first song from the film, "Jeete Hain Chal", was released by Ram Madhvani, Sonam Kapoor and Prasoon Joshi at a launch event held on 1 February 2016 in Mumbai. The entire soundtrack album was released digitally by T-Series on 5 February 2016.

== Release ==
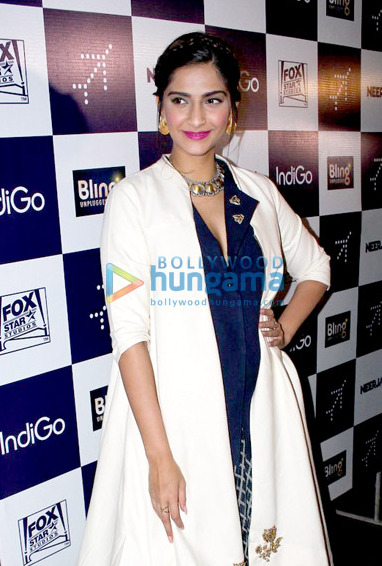
Sonam Kapoor gracing 'Neerja' screening for the crew of Indigo airlines

The film had a special screening on 16 February 2016 in Mumbai, which was attended by celebrities, including filmmaker Karan Johar; Subhash Ghai; Kapoor's father, Anil Kapoor; Sachin Tendulkar; Yuvraj Singh; Sunil Gavaskar; Ayushmann Khurrana; and Amit Sadh. The film received a positive response from many Bollywood celebrities, with Tendulkar calling Neerja Bhanot a "Braveheart" and saying that "the people should definitely watch the film."

The film was released worldwide, in approximately 671 theatres, on 19 February 2016. Upon release, Neerja received positive reviews, with praise directed to Kapoor's performance, and was a huge box office success. The film was also praised by Delhi's Chief Minister, Arvind Kejriwal, who tweeted that the film's message was, "Live for others, die for others." The film emerged as one of the highest-grossing Bollywood films featuring a female protagonist.

Neerja was banned in Pakistan, for reasons that remain uncertain. The CBFC maintained that the film should not be considered "banned" in Pakistan because it was not submitted to them.

=== Tax-free ===
The film was declared tax-free by Government of Maharashtra and the Government of Madhya Pradesh.

The Finance Minister, Jayant Kumar Malaiya, said, "The movies Neerja and Jai Gangaajal will be free from entertainment tax in Madhya Pradesh on account of International Women's Day which was celebrated yesterday." Producer Kasbekar, replied on Twitter, "Big thank you to MP Poonam Mahajan and the Hon CM Devendra Fadnavis in declaring Neerja tax free in Maharashtra. Quick and decisive decision."

== Reception ==
=== Box office ===
==== India ====
On its first day, the film earned about ₹47 million (US$490,000) net, much of it from Mumbai and Delhi NCR. It collected ₹76 million (US$790,000) net on Saturday and ₹97.1 million (US$1.0 million) on Sunday, with a weekend total of ₹210 million (US$2.2 million).

On Monday, the film netted around ₹37 million (US$380,000), with only around a 20% drop in revenue compared to first day. On Tuesday, the film earned around ₹34.1 million (US$350,000). The film's Wednesday, Thursday and Friday earnings were ₹31.4 million (US$330,000), ₹36 million (US$370,000), and ₹31.5 million (US$330,000), respectively. On Saturday and Sunday, Neerja had a massive jump and earned ₹50 million (US$520,000) and ₹66.5 million (US$690,000) respectively, for a total collection of ₹501 million (US$5.2 million) at the box office.

On the 11th day (Monday), Neerja collected ₹21.2 million (US$220,000); ₹19 million (US$200,000) on Tuesday; ₹18.5 million (US$190,000) on Wednesday; and ₹17.6 million (US$180,000) on Thursday. By the end of its 38-day run, the film had grossed an estimated ₹1.08 billion (US$11 million) domestically and ₹259 million (US$2.7 million) internationally, for an approximate worldwide total of ₹1.35 billion (US$14 million).

==== Overseas ====
Neerja opened strong, collecting ₹1.56 million (US$16,000) in foreign theatres. The film had the highest opening weekend for a female-led film in the US and Middle East; in the UK, it had the second-highest opening weekend of 2016.

=== Critical response ===
Upon release, the film, as well as Kapoor’s performance, received widespread praise from film critics around the world. On review aggregator Rotten Tomatoes, the film holds an approval rating of 100%, based on 12 reviews with an average rating of 8/10. Shubha Shetty-Saha of Mid-Day gave the film 4.5 out of 5 stars, calling it "a deeply moving experience", and writing for Kapoor deemed it as "her best performance till date". Meena Iyer of The Times of India gave Neerja 4 out of 5 stars and said, "Neerja raises a toast to the daunting spirit of India's daughters; every one of us must salute Neerja." Bollywood Hungama gave the film 4 out of 5 stars and said, "As a movie-watching experience, Neerja is flawless. There's not a single false note." Writing for Hindustan Times, Anupama Chopra awarded 4 out of 5 stars, saying that "Neerja is a truly inspiring story that will grip you from the first frame till the last." Sarita Tanwar from Daily News and Analysis gave 4 out of 5 stars, writing, "Neerja is quite easily the finest film in recent times (on par with Talvar (2015)) based on a true story." Raja Sen from Rediff.com gave 4 out of 5 stars as well and called it "an absolute must-watch," adding that "Sonam Kapoor is exceptional as Neerja Bhanot." Suahni Singh of India Today rated the film as a 3.5 stars and stated, "Sonam Kapoor delivered her career-best performance as she assuredly plays an abused wife, a beloved daughter and a flight attendant caught in her worst nightmare."

Rummana of Yahoo! gave it 4 out of 5 stars, stating, "Neerja deserves loud applause because not only is it an exceptional story of courage but because it is an ode to the undying spirit of humanity" and called Kapoor as "the star of the film". The Economic Times also gave a 4 out of 5 star rating: "Neerja is a must-see, not just for its cinematic value, but also as a reminder to salute Neerja's spirit." Rajeev Masand of News18 gave a 3.5 out of 5 rating and said, "Neerja is a well-intentioned, heartfelt film that pays tribute to a real hero." Shubhra Gupta of The Indian Express also gave the film 3 stars out of 5, writing that "Minus the songs and the excessive schmaltz, Neerja could have been outstanding. But still, the film holds, and hold us with it."

Manjusha Radhakrishnan of Gulf News rated the film 4 out of 5 stars; while she criticised the terrorists' lack of depth and weak points in Neerja's second half, she wrote that "the climax of the film is powerful and makes up for that blip." Jason Klein of Variety declared that DAR-Film Leaderboard was notably absent of Oscar-nominated films, but part of the gap was filled by Neerja. Sonali Kokra of The National praised the film: "Neerja is a great story told well. Mitesh Mirchandani’s jerky camerawork does a great job of using the claustrophobic confines of the aircraft to showcase the oppressiveness of the situation and the terror of the hostages."

== See also ==
- List of Bollywood films of 2016
